= NGC 6401 =

Globular cluster in the constellation Ophiuchus

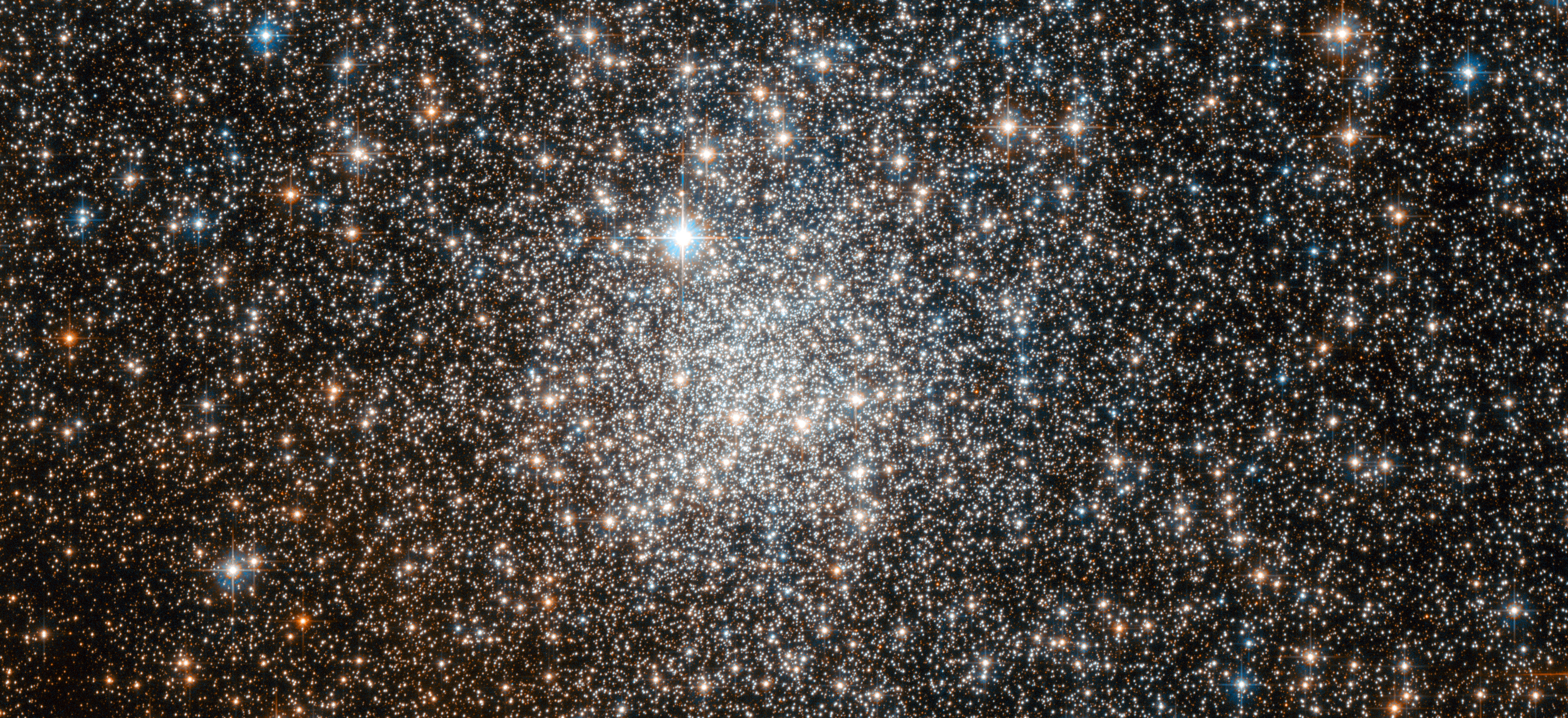
- HST image of NGC 6401

Observation data (J2000 epoch)
- Constellation: Ophiuchus
- Right ascension: 17^{h} 38^{m} 36.93^{s}
- Declination: −23° 54′ 31.5″
- Distance: 25.1 kly (7.70 kpc)
- Apparent magnitude (V): 7.4
- Apparent dimensions (V): 4.8′

Physical characteristics
- Metallicity: [Fe/H] = −1.15±0.20 dex
- Estimated age: 13.2±1.2 Gyr
- Other designations: GC 4314, NGC 6301

NGC 6401 is a globular cluster in the equatorial constellation of Ophiuchus. This star cluster was discovered by German-English astronomer William Herschel in 1784, but he mistakenly classified it as a bright nebula. Later, his son John Herschel came to the same conclusion because the technology of the day did not allow the individual stars to be visually resolved. It is visible in a small telescope, with an apparent visual magnitude of 7.4 and an angular diameter of 4.8′.

This cluster is located at a distance of 25.1 kly (7.70 kpc) from the Sun and is orbiting in the galactic bulge, in the inner part of the Milky Way galaxy. Because of its high mass, it may be gravitationally trapped inside the Milky Way's bar. From the perspective of the Earth, this cluster is situated 5.3° from the Galactic Center and is strongly reddened due to extinction from interstellar dust. NGC 6401 is a very old cluster with an estimated age of 13.2±1.2 Gyr, but has not undergone core collapse. It has a cluster radius of 2.4′.

23 class ab and 11 class c RR Lyrae variables have been identified within a cluster radius of the core. From this, it is deduced that this is an Oosterhoff type I (Oo I) cluster.

During the June 2011 lunar eclipse, a Total Lunar Eclipse, it was occulted by the Moon over Europe, North Africa and Southwest Asia. This will happen again during the June 2076 lunar eclipse over Eastern North America, Cuba, the Atlantic Ocean, Southeast Europe and the northern half of Africa.
