= Lunar Saros 132 =

Eclipse cycle of the moon

| Member 29 | Member 30 |
|---|---|
| 1997 Mar 24 | 2015 Apr 4 |

Saros series 132 for lunar eclipses occurs at the moon's ascending node, repeating every 18 years 11 and 1/3 days. It contains 71 member events, including 44 umbral lunar eclipses (32 partial lunar eclipses and 12 total lunar eclipses, starting in 2015 and ending in 2213).

== List ==
| Cat. | Saros | Mem | Date | Time UT (hr:mn) | Type | Gamma | Magnitude | Duration (min) | | | Contacts UT (hr:mn) | | | | | | Chart |
| Cat. | Saros | Mem | Date | Greatest | Type | Gamma | Magnitude | Pen. | Par. | Tot. | P1 | P4 | U1 | U2 | U3 | U4 | Chart |
|---|---|---|---|---|---|---|---|---|---|---|---|---|---|---|---|---|---|
| 08415 | 132 | 1 | 1492 May 12 | 6:21:14 | Penumbral | 1.5337 | -0.9474 | 52.0 | | | 5:55:14 | 6:47:14 | | | | | |
| 08455 | 132 | 2 | 1510 May 23 | 13:38:07 | Penumbral | 1.4701 | -0.8316 | 108.1 | | | 12:44:04 | 14:32:10 | | | | | |
| 08496 | 132 | 3 | 1528 Jun 02 | 20:49:34 | Penumbral | 1.4025 | -0.7088 | 144.9 | | | 19:37:07 | 22:02:01 | | | | | |
| 08537 | 132 | 4 | 1546 Jun 14 | 3:57:38 | Penumbral | 1.3329 | -0.5824 | 174.0 | | | 2:30:38 | 5:24:38 | | | | | |
| 08580 | 132 | 5 | 1564 Jun 24 | 11:03:08 | Penumbral | 1.2616 | -0.4534 | 198.6 | | | 9:23:50 | 12:42:26 | | | | | |
| 08623 | 132 | 6 | 1582 Jul 05 | 18:08:00 | Penumbral | 1.1903 | -0.3245 | 219.8 | | | 16:18:06 | 19:57:54 | | | | | |
| 08666 | 132 | 7 | 1600 Jul 26 | 1:13:18 | Penumbral | 1.1200 | -0.1978 | 238.3 | | | 23:14:09 | 3:12:27 | | | | | |
| 08711 | 132 | 8 | 1618 Aug 06 | 8:19:44 | Penumbral | 1.0513 | -0.0743 | 254.4 | | | 6:12:32 | 10:26:56 | | | | | |
| 08755 | 132 | 9 | 1636 Aug 16 | 15:29:55 | Partial | 0.9861 | 0.0426 | 268.4 | 47.8 | | 13:15:43 | 17:44:07 | 15:06:01 | | | 15:53:49 | |
| 08799 | 132 | 10 | 1654 Aug 27 | 22:44:01 | Partial | 0.9246 | 0.1526 | 280.5 | 89.3 | | 20:23:46 | 1:04:16 | 21:59:22 | | | 23:28:40 | |
| 08844 | 132 | 11 | 1672 Sep 07 | 6:03:27 | Partial | 0.8681 | 0.2531 | 291.0 | 113.7 | | 3:37:57 | 8:28:57 | 5:06:36 | | | 7:00:18 | |
| 08890 | 132 | 12 | 1690 Sep 18 | 13:28:36 | Partial | 0.8169 | 0.3440 | 300.0 | 131.2 | | 10:58:36 | 15:58:36 | 12:23:00 | | | 14:34:12 | |
| 08936 | 132 | 13 | 1708 Sep 29 | 21:01:05 | Partial | 0.7725 | 0.4224 | 307.5 | 144.1 | | 18:27:20 | 23:34:50 | 19:49:02 | | | 22:13:08 | |
| 08983 | 132 | 14 | 1726 Oct 11 | 4:40:33 | Partial | 0.7341 | 0.4897 | 314.0 | 154.0 | | 2:03:33 | 7:17:33 | 3:23:33 | | | 5:57:33 | |
| 09029 | 132 | 15 | 1744 Oct 21 | 12:26:28 | Partial | 0.7016 | 0.5462 | 319.4 | 161.7 | | 9:46:46 | 15:06:10 | 11:05:37 | | | 13:47:19 | |
| 09076 | 132 | 16 | 1762 Nov 01 | 20:19:49 | Partial | 0.6759 | 0.5905 | 323.8 | 167.4 | | 17:37:55 | 23:01:43 | 18:56:07 | | | 21:43:31 | |
| 09122 | 132 | 17 | 1780 Nov 12 | 4:19:52 | Partial | 0.6565 | 0.6232 | 327.5 | 171.5 | | 1:36:07 | 7:03:37 | 2:54:07 | | | 5:45:37 | |
| 09167 | 132 | 18 | 1798 Nov 23 | 12:25:24 | Partial | 0.6421 | 0.6472 | 330.4 | 174.5 | | 9:40:12 | 15:10:36 | 10:58:09 | | | 13:52:39 | |
| 09212 | 132 | 19 | 1816 Dec 04 | 20:35:14 | Partial | 0.6319 | 0.6636 | 332.8 | 176.7 | | 17:48:50 | 23:21:38 | 19:06:53 | | | 22:03:35 | |
| 09258 | 132 | 20 | 1834 Dec 16 | 4:48:07 | Partial | 0.6249 | 0.6746 | 334.8 | 178.2 | | 2:00:43 | 7:35:31 | 3:19:01 | | | 6:17:13 | |
| 09305 | 132 | 21 | 1852 Dec 26 | 13:03:06 | Partial | 0.6203 | 0.6815 | 336.5 | 179.3 | | 10:14:51 | 15:51:21 | 11:33:27 | | | 14:32:45 | |
| 09349 | 132 | 22 | 1871 Jan 06 | 21:16:40 | Partial | 0.6154 | 0.6893 | 338.0 | 180.5 | | 18:27:40 | 0:05:40 | 19:46:25 | | | 22:46:55 | |
| 09392 | 132 | 23 | 1889 Jan 17 | 5:29:39 | Partial | 0.6106 | 0.6972 | 339.5 | 181.7 | | 2:39:54 | 8:19:24 | 3:58:48 | | | 7:00:30 | |
| 09435 | 132 | 24 | 1907 Jan 29 | 13:38:00 | Partial | 0.6027 | 0.7110 | 341.1 | 183.5 | | 10:47:27 | 16:28:33 | 12:06:15 | | | 15:09:45 | |
| 09477 | 132 | 25 | 1925 Feb 08 | 21:42:22 | Partial | 0.5921 | 0.7304 | 342.9 | 185.7 | | 18:50:55 | 0:33:49 | 20:09:31 | | | 23:15:13 | |
| 09519 | 132 | 26 | 1943 Feb 20 | 5:38:23 | Partial | 0.5751 | 0.7616 | 345.1 | 189.0 | | 2:45:50 | 8:30:56 | 4:03:53 | | | 7:12:53 | |
| 09560 | 132 | 27 | 1961 Mar 02 | 13:28:40 | Partial | 0.5540 | 0.8006 | 347.6 | 192.9 | | 10:34:52 | 16:22:28 | 11:52:13 | | | 15:05:07 | |
| 09601 | 132 | 28 | 1979 Mar 13 | 21:08:52 | Partial | 0.5253 | 0.8538 | 350.6 | 197.7 | | 18:13:34 | 0:04:10 | 19:30:01 | | | 22:47:43 | |
| 09642 | 132 | 29 | 1997 Mar 24 | 4:40:28 | Partial | 0.4899 | 0.9195 | 353.9 | 203.1 | | 1:43:31 | 7:37:25 | 2:58:55 | | | 6:22:01 | |
| 09684 | 132 | 30 | 2015 Apr 04 | 12:01:24 | Total | 0.4460 | 1.0008 | 357.5 | 209.0 | 4.7 | 9:02:39 | 15:00:09 | 10:16:54 | 11:59:03 | 12:03:45 | 13:45:54 | |
| 09725 | 132 | 31 | 2033 Apr 14 | 19:13:51 | Total | 0.3954 | 1.0944 | 361.2 | 215.0 | 49.2 | 16:13:15 | 22:14:27 | 17:26:21 | 18:49:15 | 19:38:27 | 21:01:21 | |
| 09765 | 132 | 32 | 2051 Apr 26 | 2:16:28 | Total | 0.3371 | 1.2022 | 364.8 | 220.8 | 69.6 | 23:14:04 | 5:18:52 | 0:26:04 | 1:41:40 | 2:51:16 | 4:06:52 | |
| 09806 | 132 | 33 | 2069 May 06 | 9:09:57 | Total | 0.2717 | 1.3229 | 368.1 | 226.2 | 84.3 | 6:05:54 | 12:14:00 | 7:16:51 | 8:27:48 | 9:52:06 | 11:03:03 | |
| 09847 | 132 | 34 | 2087 May 17 | 15:55:20 | Total | 0.1999 | 1.4554 | 371.0 | 230.6 | 95.1 | 12:49:50 | 19:00:50 | 14:00:02 | 15:07:47 | 16:42:53 | 17:50:38 | |
| 09889 | 132 | 35 | 2105 May 28 | 22:34:06 | Total | 0.1227 | 1.5976 | 373.1 | 233.9 | 102.3 | 19:27:33 | 1:40:39 | 20:37:09 | 21:42:57 | 23:25:15 | 0:31:03 | |
| 09931 | 132 | 36 | 2123 Jun 09 | 5:06:28 | Total | 0.0406 | 1.7487 | 374.3 | 235.7 | 106.1 | 1:59:19 | 8:13:37 | 3:08:37 | 4:13:25 | 5:59:31 | 7:04:19 | |
| 09974 | 132 | 37 | 2141 Jun 19 | 11:34:51 | Total | -0.0446 | 1.7415 | 374.4 | 235.9 | 106.1 | 8:27:39 | 14:42:03 | 9:36:54 | 10:41:48 | 12:27:54 | 13:32:48 | |
| 10018 | 132 | 38 | 2159 Jun 30 | 18:00:09 | Total | -0.1322 | 1.5809 | 373.4 | 234.1 | 102.0 | 14:53:27 | 21:06:51 | 16:03:06 | 17:09:09 | 18:51:09 | 19:57:12 | |
| 10061 | 132 | 39 | 2177 Jul 11 | 0:25:23 | Total | -0.2199 | 1.4199 | 371.2 | 230.4 | 93.0 | 21:19:47 | 3:30:59 | 22:30:11 | 23:38:53 | 1:11:53 | 2:20:35 | |
| 10104 | 132 | 40 | 2195 Jul 22 | 6:49:10 | Total | -0.3086 | 1.2569 | 367.7 | 224.6 | 77.4 | 3:45:19 | 9:53:01 | 4:56:52 | 6:10:28 | 7:27:52 | 8:41:28 | |
| 10148 | 132 | 41 | 2213 Aug 02 | 13:16:20 | Total | -0.3946 | 1.0987 | 363.1 | 216.8 | 50.6 | 10:14:47 | 16:17:53 | 11:27:56 | 12:51:02 | 13:41:38 | 15:04:44 | |
| 10192 | 132 | 42 | 2231 Aug 13 | 19:45:54 | Partial | -0.4786 | 0.9439 | 357.4 | 206.9 | | 16:47:12 | 22:44:36 | 18:02:27 | | | 21:29:21 | |
| 10238 | 132 | 43 | 2249 Aug 24 | 2:22:14 | Partial | -0.5572 | 0.7990 | 350.9 | 195.3 | | 23:26:47 | 5:17:41 | 0:44:35 | | | 3:59:53 | |
| 10284 | 132 | 44 | 2267 Sep 04 | 9:02:59 | Partial | -0.6322 | 0.6605 | 343.6 | 181.7 | | 6:11:11 | 11:54:47 | 7:32:08 | | | 10:33:50 | |
| 10330 | 132 | 45 | 2285 Sep 14 | 15:53:25 | Partial | -0.6997 | 0.5357 | 336.1 | 166.9 | | 13:05:22 | 18:41:28 | 14:29:58 | | | 17:16:52 | |
| 10376 | 132 | 46 | 2303 Sep 26 | 22:50:54 | Partial | -0.7615 | 0.4212 | 328.4 | 150.5 | | 20:06:42 | 1:35:06 | 21:35:39 | | | 0:06:09 | |
| 10422 | 132 | 47 | 2321 Oct 07 | 5:58:35 | Partial | -0.8152 | 0.3218 | 320.9 | 133.4 | | 3:18:08 | 8:39:02 | 4:51:53 | | | 7:05:17 | |
| 10468 | 132 | 48 | 2339 Oct 18 | 13:14:22 | Partial | -0.8625 | 0.2339 | 313.8 | 115.1 | | 10:37:28 | 15:51:16 | 12:16:49 | | | 14:11:55 | |
| 10513 | 132 | 49 | 2357 Oct 28 | 20:41:13 | Partial | -0.9009 | 0.1625 | 307.4 | 96.8 | | 18:07:31 | 23:14:55 | 19:52:49 | | | 21:29:37 | |
| 10558 | 132 | 50 | 2375 Nov 09 | 4:16:34 | Partial | -0.9330 | 0.1030 | 301.8 | 77.6 | | 1:45:40 | 6:47:28 | 3:37:46 | | | 4:55:22 | |
| 10602 | 132 | 51 | 2393 Nov 19 | 12:00:29 | Partial | -0.9583 | 0.0560 | 297.0 | 57.5 | | 9:31:59 | 14:28:59 | 11:31:44 | | | 12:29:14 | |
| 10648 | 132 | 52 | 2411 Nov 30 | 19:52:22 | Partial | -0.9774 | 0.0205 | 293.1 | 34.9 | | 17:25:49 | 22:18:55 | 19:34:55 | | | 20:09:49 | |
| 10692 | 132 | 53 | 2429 Dec 11 | 3:51:44 | Penumbral | -0.9904 | -0.0033 | 290.1 | | | 1:26:41 | 6:16:47 | | | | | |
| 10736 | 132 | 54 | 2447 Dec 22 | 11:56:10 | Penumbral | -1.0001 | -0.0207 | 287.7 | | | 9:32:19 | 14:20:01 | | | | | |
| 10779 | 132 | 55 | 2466 Jan 01 | 20:04:17 | Penumbral | -1.0070 | -0.0328 | 285.6 | | | 17:41:29 | 22:27:05 | | | | | |
| 10821 | 132 | 56 | 2484 Jan 13 | 4:14:53 | Penumbral | -1.0124 | -0.0418 | 283.8 | | | 1:52:59 | 6:36:47 | | | | | |
| 10862 | 132 | 57 | 2502 Jan 24 | 12:26:40 | Penumbral | -1.0173 | -0.0494 | 281.9 | | | 10:05:43 | 14:47:37 | | | | | |
| 10903 | 132 | 58 | 2520 Feb 04 | 20:36:27 | Penumbral | -1.0242 | -0.0603 | 279.5 | | | 18:16:42 | 22:56:12 | | | | | |
| 10943 | 132 | 59 | 2538 Feb 15 | 4:44:31 | Penumbral | -1.0329 | -0.0744 | 276.6 | | | 2:26:13 | 7:02:49 | | | | | |
| 10985 | 132 | 60 | 2556 Feb 26 | 12:48:08 | Penumbral | -1.0459 | -0.0959 | 272.7 | | | 10:31:47 | 15:04:29 | | | | | |
| 11026 | 132 | 61 | 2574 Mar 08 | 20:47:08 | Penumbral | -1.0631 | -0.1249 | 267.8 | | | 18:33:14 | 23:01:02 | | | | | |
| 11066 | 132 | 62 | 2592 Mar 19 | 4:38:54 | Penumbral | -1.0867 | -0.1655 | 261.3 | | | 2:28:15 | 6:49:33 | | | | | |
| 11106 | 132 | 63 | 2610 Mar 31 | 12:25:16 | Penumbral | -1.1153 | -0.2149 | 253.5 | | | 10:18:31 | 14:32:01 | | | | | |
| 11146 | 132 | 64 | 2628 Apr 10 | 20:04:00 | Penumbral | -1.1504 | -0.2764 | 243.7 | | | 18:02:09 | 22:05:51 | | | | | |
| 11187 | 132 | 65 | 2646 Apr 22 | 3:35:31 | Penumbral | -1.1920 | -0.3496 | 231.6 | | | 1:39:43 | 5:31:19 | | | | | |
| 11228 | 132 | 66 | 2664 May 2 | 11:00:10 | Penumbral | -1.2396 | -0.4340 | 216.8 | | | 9:11:46 | 12:48:34 | | | | | |
| 11271 | 132 | 67 | 2682 May 13 | 18:18:50 | Penumbral | -1.2927 | -0.5284 | 198.9 | | | 16:39:23 | 19:58:17 | | | | | |
| 11313 | 132 | 68 | 2700 May 25 | 1:32:20 | Penumbral | -1.3504 | -0.6315 | 176.9 | | | 0:03:53 | 3:00:47 | | | | | |
| 11356 | 132 | 69 | 2718 Jun 05 | 8:40:08 | Penumbral | -1.4132 | -0.7438 | 148.9 | | | 7:25:41 | 9:54:35 | | | | | |
| 11398 | 132 | 70 | 2736 Jun 15 | 15:45:49 | Penumbral | -1.4783 | -0.8608 | 111.5 | | | 14:50:04 | 16:41:34 | | | | | |
| 11441 | 132 | 71 | 2754 Jun 26 | 22:48:44 | Penumbral | -1.5463 | -0.9832 | 45.1 | | | 22:26:11 | 23:11:17 | | | | | |

== See also ==
- List of lunar eclipses
  - List of Saros series for lunar eclipses
