= April 2033 lunar eclipse =

Astronomical event

- Total eclipse
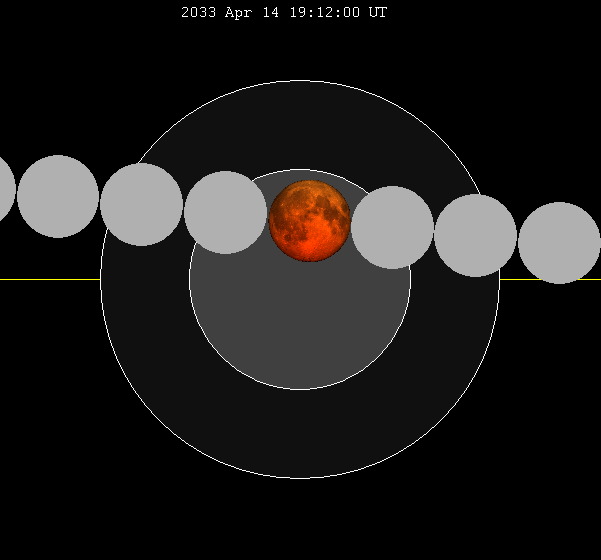
- The Moon's hourly motion shown right to left
- Date: April 14, 2033
- Gamma: 0.3954
- Magnitude: 1.0955
- Saros cycle: 132 (31 of 71)
- Totality: 49 minutes, 12 seconds
- Partiality: 215 minutes, 0 seconds
- Penumbral: 361 minutes, 11 seconds
Contacts (UTC)
- P1: 16:13:15
- U1: 17:26:21
- U2: 18:49:15
- Greatest: 19:13:51
- U3: 19:38:27
- U4: 21:01:21
- P4: 22:14:27

A total lunar eclipse will occur at the Moon’s ascending node of orbit on Thursday, April 14, 2033, with an umbral magnitude of 1.0955. A lunar eclipse occurs when the Moon moves into the Earth's shadow, causing the Moon to be darkened. A total lunar eclipse occurs when the Moon's near side entirely passes into the Earth's umbral shadow. Unlike a solar eclipse, which can only be viewed from a relatively small area of the world, a lunar eclipse may be viewed from anywhere on the night side of Earth. A total lunar eclipse can last up to nearly two hours, while a total solar eclipse lasts only a few minutes at any given place, because the Moon's shadow is smaller. Occurring about 2.9 days before apogee (on April 11, 2033, at 22:30 UTC), the Moon's apparent diameter will be smaller.

This lunar eclipse is the third of a tetrad, with four total lunar eclipses in series, the others being on April 25, 2032; October 18, 2032; and October 8, 2033.

== Visibility ==
The eclipse will be completely visible over east Africa, most of Asia, and western Australia, seen rising over west and central Africa, Europe, and eastern South America and setting over northeast Asia and Australia.

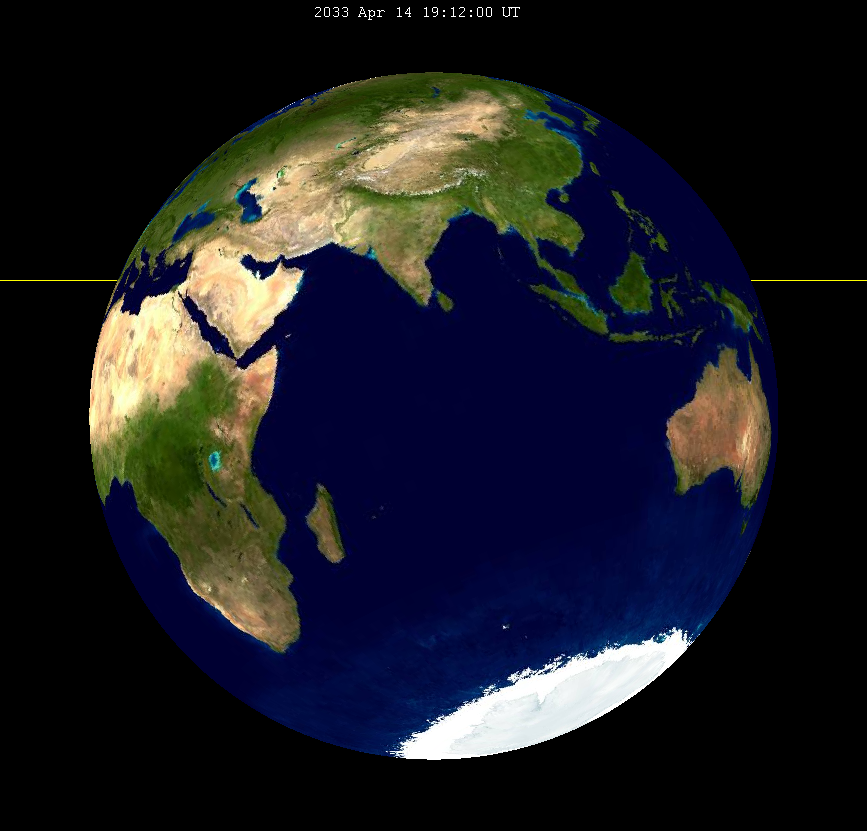
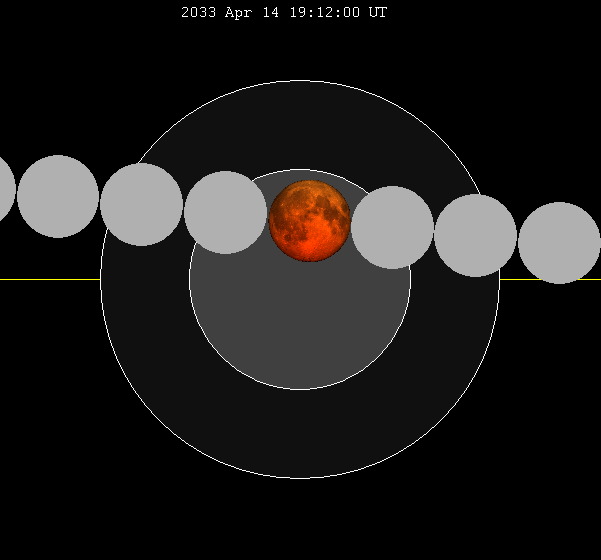

== Eclipse details ==
Shown below is a table displaying details about this particular solar eclipse. It describes various parameters pertaining to this eclipse.

April 14, 2033 Lunar Eclipse Parameters
Parameter	Value
Penumbral Magnitude	2.17223
Umbral Magnitude	1.09553
Gamma	0.39543
Sun Right Ascension	01h33m13.7s
Sun Declination	+09°43'50.2"
Sun Semi-Diameter	15'56.7"
Sun Equatorial Horizontal Parallax	08.8"
Moon Right Ascension	13h33m37.2s
Moon Declination	-09°23'08.7"
Moon Semi-Diameter	14'48.5"
Moon Equatorial Horizontal Parallax	0°54'21.0"
ΔT	75.5 s

== Eclipse season ==
This eclipse is part of an eclipse season, a period, roughly every six months, when eclipses occur. Only two (or occasionally three) eclipse seasons occur each year, and each season lasts about 35 days and repeats just short of six months (173 days) later; thus two full eclipse seasons always occur each year. Either two or three eclipses happen each eclipse season. In the sequence below, each eclipse is separated by a fortnight.

Eclipse season of March–April 2033
March 30 Descending node (new moon)	April 14 Ascending node (full moon)
Partial solar eclipse Solar Saros 120	Total lunar eclipse Lunar Saros 132

== Related eclipses ==
=== Eclipses in 2033 ===
- A total solar eclipse on March 30.
- A total lunar eclipse on April 14.
- A partial solar eclipse on September 23.
- A total lunar eclipse on October 8.

=== Metonic ===
- Preceded by: Lunar eclipse of June 26, 2029
- Followed by: Lunar eclipse of January 31, 2037

=== Tzolkinex ===
- Preceded by: Lunar eclipse of March 3, 2026
- Followed by: Lunar eclipse of May 26, 2040

=== Half-Saros ===
- Preceded by: Solar eclipse of April 8, 2024
- Followed by: Solar eclipse of April 20, 2042

=== Tritos ===
- Preceded by: Lunar eclipse of May 16, 2022
- Followed by: Lunar eclipse of March 13, 2044

=== Lunar Saros 132 ===
- Preceded by: Lunar eclipse of April 4, 2015
- Followed by: Lunar eclipse of April 26, 2051

=== Inex ===
- Preceded by: Lunar eclipse of May 4, 2004
- Followed by: Lunar eclipse of March 25, 2062

=== Triad ===
- Preceded by: Lunar eclipse of June 14, 1946
- Followed by: Lunar eclipse of February 14, 2120

=== Lunar eclipses of 2031–2034 ===
This eclipse is a member of a semester series. An eclipse in a semester series of lunar eclipses repeats approximately every 177 days and 4 hours (a semester) at alternating nodes of the Moon's orbit.

The penumbral lunar eclipse on June 5, 2031 occurs in the previous lunar year eclipse set.

Lunar eclipse series sets from 2031 to 2034
Ascending node				Descending node			
Saros	Date Viewing	Type Chart	Gamma	Saros	Date Viewing	Type Chart	Gamma
112	2031 May 07	Penumbral	−1.0694	117	2031 Oct 30	Penumbral	1.1774
122	2032 Apr 25	Total	−0.3558	127	2032 Oct 18	Total	0.4169
132	2033 Apr 14	Total	0.3954	137	2033 Oct 08	Total	−0.2889
142	2034 Apr 03	Penumbral	1.1144	147	2034 Sep 28	Partial	−1.0110

=== Saros 132 ===
This eclipse is a part of Saros series 132, repeating every 18 years, 11 days, and containing 71 events. The series started with a penumbral lunar eclipse on May 12, 1492. It contains partial eclipses from August 16, 1636 through March 24, 1997; total eclipses from April 4, 2015 through August 2, 2213; and a second set of partial eclipses from August 13, 2231 through November 30, 2411. The series ends at member 71 as a penumbral eclipse on June 26, 2754.

The longest duration of totality will be produced by member 36 at 106 minutes, 6 seconds on June 9, 2123. All eclipses in this series occur at the Moon’s ascending node of orbit.

Greatest	First			
The greatest eclipse of the series will occur on 2123 Jun 09, lasting 106 minutes, 6 seconds.	Penumbral	Partial	Total	Central
The greatest eclipse of the series will occur on 2123 Jun 09, lasting 106 minutes, 6 seconds.	1492 May 12	1636 Aug 16	2015 Apr 04	2069 May 06
The greatest eclipse of the series will occur on 2123 Jun 09, lasting 106 minutes, 6 seconds.	Last			
The greatest eclipse of the series will occur on 2123 Jun 09, lasting 106 minutes, 6 seconds.	Central	Total	Partial	Penumbral
The greatest eclipse of the series will occur on 2123 Jun 09, lasting 106 minutes, 6 seconds.	2177 Jul 11	2213 Aug 02	2411 Nov 30	2754 Jun 26

Eclipses are tabulated in three columns; every third eclipse in the same column is one exeligmos apart, so they all cast shadows over approximately the same parts of the Earth.

Series members 19–40 occur between 1801 and 2200:
19	20	21
1816 Dec 04	1834 Dec 16	1852 Dec 26
22	23	24
1871 Jan 06	1889 Jan 17	1907 Jan 29
25	26	27
1925 Feb 08	1943 Feb 20	1961 Mar 02
28	29	30
1979 Mar 13	1997 Mar 24	2015 Apr 04
31	32	33
2033 Apr 14	2051 Apr 26	2069 May 06
34	35	36
2087 May 17	2105 May 28	2123 Jun 09
37	38	39
2141 Jun 19	2159 Jun 30	2177 Jul 11
40
2195 Jul 22

=== Tritos series ===
This eclipse is a part of a tritos cycle, repeating at alternating nodes every 135 synodic months (≈ 3986.63 days, or 11 years minus 1 month). Their appearance and longitude are irregular due to a lack of synchronization with the anomalistic month (period of perigee), but groupings of 3 tritos cycles (≈ 33 years minus 3 months) come close (≈ 434.044 anomalistic months), so eclipses are similar in these groupings.

Series members between 1801 and 2200
1804 Jan 26 (Saros 111)	1814 Dec 26 (Saros 112)	1825 Nov 25 (Saros 113)	1836 Oct 24 (Saros 114)	1847 Sep 24 (Saros 115)
1858 Aug 24 (Saros 116)	1869 Jul 23 (Saros 117)	1880 Jun 22 (Saros 118)	1891 May 23 (Saros 119)	1902 Apr 22 (Saros 120)
1913 Mar 22 (Saros 121)	1924 Feb 20 (Saros 122)	1935 Jan 19 (Saros 123)	1945 Dec 19 (Saros 124)	1956 Nov 18 (Saros 125)
1967 Oct 18 (Saros 126)	1978 Sep 16 (Saros 127)	1989 Aug 17 (Saros 128)	2000 Jul 16 (Saros 129)	2011 Jun 15 (Saros 130)
2022 May 16 (Saros 131)	2033 Apr 14 (Saros 132)	2044 Mar 13 (Saros 133)	2055 Feb 11 (Saros 134)	2066 Jan 11 (Saros 135)
2076 Dec 10 (Saros 136)	2087 Nov 10 (Saros 137)	2098 Oct 10 (Saros 138)	2109 Sep 09 (Saros 139)	2120 Aug 09 (Saros 140)
2131 Jul 10 (Saros 141)	2142 Jun 08 (Saros 142)	2153 May 08 (Saros 143)	2164 Apr 07 (Saros 144)	2175 Mar 07 (Saros 145)
2186 Feb 04 (Saros 146)	2197 Jan 04 (Saros 147)			

=== Inex series ===
This eclipse is a part of the long period inex cycle, repeating at alternating nodes, every 358 synodic months (≈ 10,571.95 days, or 29 years minus 20 days). Their appearance and longitude are irregular due to a lack of synchronization with the anomalistic month (period of perigee). However, groupings of 3 inex cycles (≈ 87 years minus 2 months) comes close (≈ 1,151.02 anomalistic months), so eclipses are similar in these groupings.

Series members between 1801 and 2200
1801 Sep 22 (Saros 124)	1830 Sep 02 (Saros 125)	1859 Aug 13 (Saros 126)
1888 Jul 23 (Saros 127)	1917 Jul 04 (Saros 128)	1946 Jun 14 (Saros 129)
1975 May 25 (Saros 130)	2004 May 04 (Saros 131)	2033 Apr 14 (Saros 132)
2062 Mar 25 (Saros 133)	2091 Mar 05 (Saros 134)	2120 Feb 14 (Saros 135)
2149 Jan 23 (Saros 136)	2178 Jan 04 (Saros 137)	

=== Half-Saros cycle ===
A lunar eclipse will be preceded and followed by solar eclipses by 9 years and 5.5 days (a half saros). This lunar eclipse is related to two total solar eclipses of Solar Saros 139.

April 8, 2024	April 20, 2042

== See also ==
- List of lunar eclipses and List of 21st-century lunar eclipses
