= May 2087 lunar eclipse =

Astronomical event

- Total eclipse
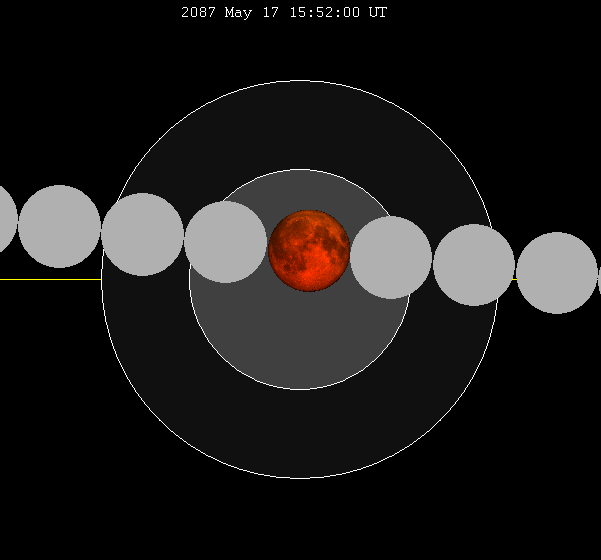
- The Moon's hourly motion shown right to left
- Date: May 17, 2087
- Gamma: 0.1999
- Magnitude: 1.4568
- Saros cycle: 132 (34 of 71)
- Totality: 95 minutes, 6 seconds
- Partiality: 230 minutes, 39 seconds
- Penumbral: 370 minutes, 57 seconds
Contacts (UTC)
- P1: 12:46:57
- U1: 13:57:08
- U2: 15:04:54
- Greatest: 15:52:27
- U3: 16:40:00
- U4: 17:47:47
- P4: 18:57:54

A total lunar eclipse will occur at the Moon’s ascending node of orbit on Saturday, May 17, 2087, with an umbral magnitude of 1.4568. It will be a central lunar eclipse, in which part of the Moon will pass through the center of the Earth's shadow. A lunar eclipse occurs when the Moon moves into the Earth's shadow, causing the Moon to be darkened. A total lunar eclipse occurs when the Moon's near side entirely passes into the Earth's umbral shadow. Unlike a solar eclipse, which can only be viewed from a relatively small area of the world, a lunar eclipse may be viewed from anywhere on the night side of Earth. A total lunar eclipse can last up to nearly two hours, while a total solar eclipse lasts only a few minutes at any given place, because the Moon's shadow is smaller. Occurring about 2 days after apogee (on May 15, 2087, at 15:25 UTC), the Moon's apparent diameter will be smaller.

== Visibility ==
The eclipse will be completely visible over east and southeast Asia, Australia, and Antarctica, seen rising over much of Africa, central and eastern Europe, and west, central, and south Asia and setting over the central and eastern Pacific Ocean.

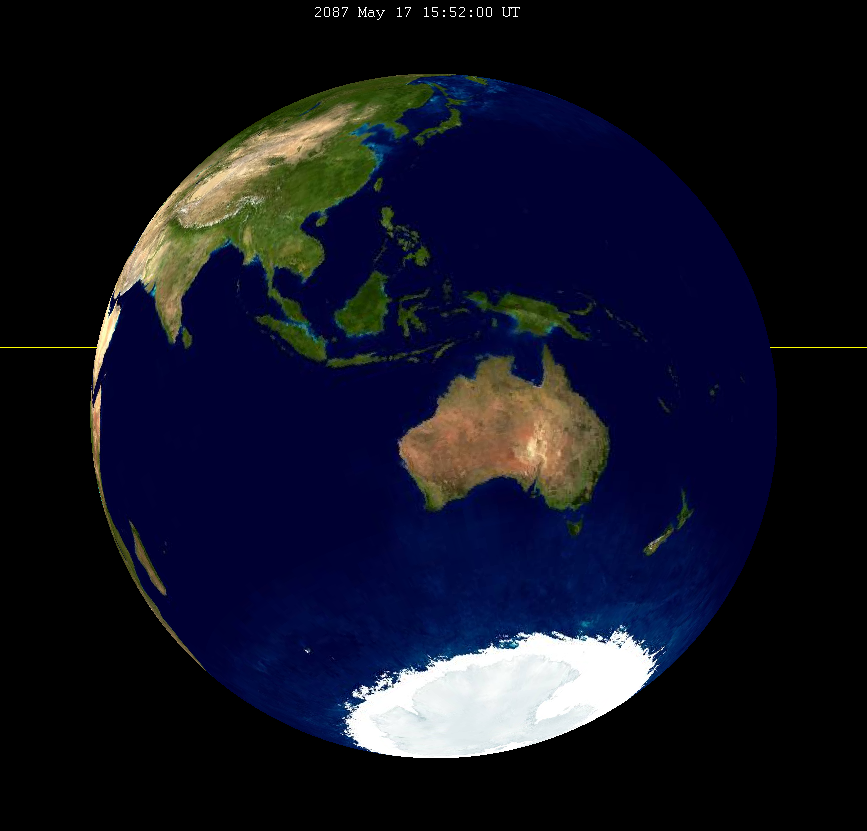
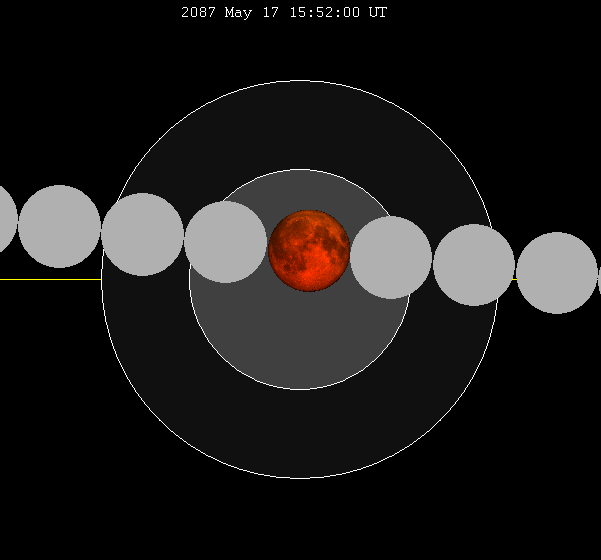

== Eclipse details ==
Shown below is a table displaying details about this particular solar eclipse. It describes various parameters pertaining to this eclipse.

May 17, 2087 Lunar Eclipse Parameters
Parameter	Value
Penumbral Magnitude	2.52894
Umbral Magnitude	1.45675
Gamma	0.19987
Sun Right Ascension	03h38m52.3s
Sun Declination	+19°28'43.2"
Sun Semi-Diameter	15'49.1"
Sun Equatorial Horizontal Parallax	08.7"
Moon Right Ascension	15h38m58.3s
Moon Declination	-19°17'59.5"
Moon Semi-Diameter	14'45.2"
Moon Equatorial Horizontal Parallax	0°54'08.7"
ΔT	114.5 s

== Eclipse season ==
This eclipse is part of an eclipse season, a period, roughly every six months, when eclipses occur. Only two (or occasionally three) eclipse seasons occur each year, and each season lasts about 35 days and repeats just short of six months (173 days) later; thus two full eclipse seasons always occur each year. Either two or three eclipses happen each eclipse season. In the sequence below, each eclipse is separated by a fortnight. The first and last eclipse in this sequence is separated by one synodic month.

Eclipse season of May–June 2087
May 2 Descending node (new moon)	May 17 Ascending node (full moon)	June 1 Descending node (new moon)
Partial solar eclipse Solar Saros 120	Total lunar eclipse Lunar Saros 132	Partial solar eclipse Solar Saros 158

== Related eclipses ==
=== Eclipses in 2087 ===
- A partial solar eclipse on May 2.
- A total lunar eclipse on May 17.
- A partial solar eclipse on June 1.
- A partial solar eclipse on October 26.
- A total lunar eclipse on November 10.

=== Metonic ===
- Preceded by: Lunar eclipse of July 29, 2083
- Followed by: Lunar eclipse of March 5, 2091

=== Tzolkinex ===
- Preceded by: Lunar eclipse of April 4, 2080
- Followed by: Lunar eclipse of June 28, 2094

=== Half-Saros ===
- Preceded by: Solar eclipse of May 11, 2078
- Followed by: Solar eclipse of May 22, 2096

=== Tritos ===
- Preceded by: Lunar eclipse of June 17, 2076
- Followed by: Lunar eclipse of April 15, 2098

=== Lunar Saros 132 ===
- Preceded by: Lunar eclipse of May 6, 2069
- Followed by: Lunar eclipse of May 28, 2105

=== Inex ===
- Preceded by: Lunar eclipse of June 6, 2058
- Followed by: Lunar eclipse of April 27, 2116

=== Triad ===
- Preceded by: Lunar eclipse of July 16, 2000
- Followed by: Lunar eclipse of March 18, 2174

=== Lunar eclipses of 2085–2088 ===
This eclipse is a member of a semester series. An eclipse in a semester series of lunar eclipses repeats approximately every 177 days and 4 hours (a semester) at alternating nodes of the Moon's orbit.

The penumbral lunar eclipses on January 10, 2085 and July 7, 2085 occur in the previous lunar year eclipse set.

Lunar eclipse series sets from 2085 to 2088
Ascending node				Descending node			
Saros	Date Viewing	Type Chart	Gamma	Saros	Date Viewing	Type Chart	Gamma
112	2085 Jun 08	Penumbral	−1.2745	117	2085 Dec 01	Penumbral	1.2189
122	2086 May 28	Partial	−0.5585	127	2086 Nov 20	Partial	0.4799
132	2087 May 17	Total	0.1999	137	2087 Nov 10	Total	−0.2043
142	2088 May 05	Partial	0.9387	147	2088 Oct 30	Partial	−0.9147

=== Saros 132 ===
This eclipse is a part of Saros series 132, repeating every 18 years, 11 days, and containing 71 events. The series started with a penumbral lunar eclipse on May 12, 1492. It contains partial eclipses from August 16, 1636 through March 24, 1997; total eclipses from April 4, 2015 through August 2, 2213; and a second set of partial eclipses from August 13, 2231 through November 30, 2411. The series ends at member 71 as a penumbral eclipse on June 26, 2754.

The longest duration of totality will be produced by member 36 at 106 minutes, 6 seconds on June 9, 2123. All eclipses in this series occur at the Moon’s ascending node of orbit.

Greatest	First			
The greatest eclipse of the series will occur on 2123 Jun 09, lasting 106 minutes, 6 seconds.	Penumbral	Partial	Total	Central
The greatest eclipse of the series will occur on 2123 Jun 09, lasting 106 minutes, 6 seconds.	1492 May 12	1636 Aug 16	2015 Apr 04	2069 May 06
The greatest eclipse of the series will occur on 2123 Jun 09, lasting 106 minutes, 6 seconds.	Last			
The greatest eclipse of the series will occur on 2123 Jun 09, lasting 106 minutes, 6 seconds.	Central	Total	Partial	Penumbral
The greatest eclipse of the series will occur on 2123 Jun 09, lasting 106 minutes, 6 seconds.	2177 Jul 11	2213 Aug 02	2411 Nov 30	2754 Jun 26

Eclipses are tabulated in three columns; every third eclipse in the same column is one exeligmos apart, so they all cast shadows over approximately the same parts of the Earth.

Series members 19–40 occur between 1801 and 2200:
19	20	21
1816 Dec 04	1834 Dec 16	1852 Dec 26
22	23	24
1871 Jan 06	1889 Jan 17	1907 Jan 29
25	26	27
1925 Feb 08	1943 Feb 20	1961 Mar 02
28	29	30
1979 Mar 13	1997 Mar 24	2015 Apr 04
31	32	33
2033 Apr 14	2051 Apr 26	2069 May 06
34	35	36
2087 May 17	2105 May 28	2123 Jun 09
37	38	39
2141 Jun 19	2159 Jun 30	2177 Jul 11
40
2195 Jul 22

=== Tritos series ===
This eclipse is a part of a tritos cycle, repeating at alternating nodes every 135 synodic months (≈ 3986.63 days, or 11 years minus 1 month). Their appearance and longitude are irregular due to a lack of synchronization with the anomalistic month (period of perigee), but groupings of 3 tritos cycles (≈ 33 years minus 3 months) come close (≈ 434.044 anomalistic months), so eclipses are similar in these groupings.

Series members between 1801 and 2200
1803 Aug 03 (Saros 106)	1814 Jul 02 (Saros 107)	1825 Jun 01 (Saros 108)	1836 May 01 (Saros 109)	1847 Mar 31 (Saros 110)
1858 Feb 27 (Saros 111)	1869 Jan 28 (Saros 112)	1879 Dec 28 (Saros 113)	1890 Nov 26 (Saros 114)	1901 Oct 27 (Saros 115)
1912 Sep 26 (Saros 116)	1923 Aug 26 (Saros 117)	1934 Jul 26 (Saros 118)	1945 Jun 25 (Saros 119)	1956 May 24 (Saros 120)
1967 Apr 24 (Saros 121)	1978 Mar 24 (Saros 122)	1989 Feb 20 (Saros 123)	2000 Jan 21 (Saros 124)	2010 Dec 21 (Saros 125)
2021 Nov 19 (Saros 126)	2032 Oct 18 (Saros 127)	2043 Sep 19 (Saros 128)	2054 Aug 18 (Saros 129)	2065 Jul 17 (Saros 130)
2076 Jun 17 (Saros 131)	2087 May 17 (Saros 132)	2098 Apr 15 (Saros 133)	2109 Mar 17 (Saros 134)	2120 Feb 14 (Saros 135)
2131 Jan 13 (Saros 136)	2141 Dec 13 (Saros 137)	2152 Nov 12 (Saros 138)	2163 Oct 12 (Saros 139)	2174 Sep 11 (Saros 140)
2185 Aug 11 (Saros 141)	2196 Jul 10 (Saros 142)			

=== Inex series ===
This eclipse is a part of the long period inex cycle, repeating at alternating nodes, every 358 synodic months (≈ 10,571.95 days, or 29 years minus 20 days). Their appearance and longitude are irregular due to a lack of synchronization with the anomalistic month (period of perigee). However, groupings of 3 inex cycles (≈ 87 years minus 2 months) comes close (≈ 1,151.02 anomalistic months), so eclipses are similar in these groupings.

Series members between 1801 and 2200
1826 Nov 14 (Saros 123)	1855 Oct 25 (Saros 124)	1884 Oct 04 (Saros 125)
1913 Sep 15 (Saros 126)	1942 Aug 26 (Saros 127)	1971 Aug 06 (Saros 128)
2000 Jul 16 (Saros 129)	2029 Jun 26 (Saros 130)	2058 Jun 06 (Saros 131)
2087 May 17 (Saros 132)	2116 Apr 27 (Saros 133)	2145 Apr 07 (Saros 134)
2174 Mar 18 (Saros 135)

=== Half-Saros cycle ===
A lunar eclipse will be preceded and followed by solar eclipses by 9 years and 5.5 days (a half saros). This lunar eclipse is related to two total solar eclipses of Solar Saros 139.

May 11, 2078	May 22, 2096

== See also ==
- List of lunar eclipses and List of 21st-century lunar eclipses
