= May 2069 lunar eclipse =

Central lunar eclipse

- Total eclipse
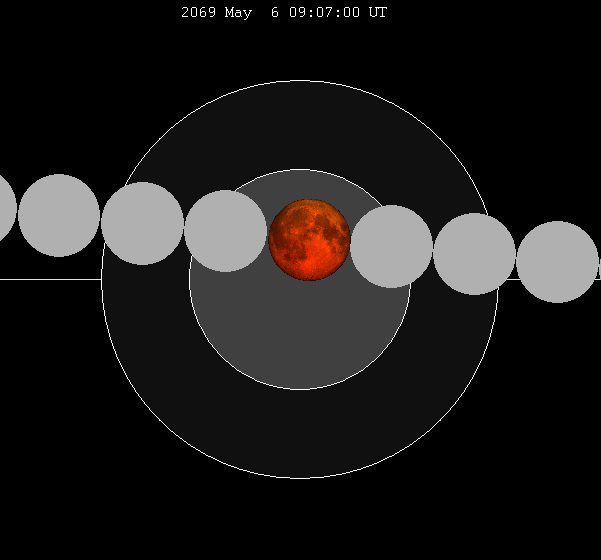
- The Moon's hourly motion shown right to left
- Date: May 6, 2069
- Gamma: 0.2717
- Magnitude: 1.3242
- Saros cycle: 132 (33 of 71)
- Totality: 84 minutes, 16 seconds
- Partiality: 226 minutes, 11 seconds
- Penumbral: 368 minutes, 7 seconds
Contacts (UTC)
- P1: 6:03:38
- U1: 7:14:38
- U2: 8:25:35
- Greatest: 9:07:43
- U3: 9:49:42
- U4: 11:00:49
- P4: 12:11:45

A total lunar eclipse will occur at the Moon’s ascending node of orbit on Monday, May 6, 2069, with an umbral magnitude of 1.3242. It will be a central lunar eclipse, in which part of the Moon will pass through the center of the Earth's shadow. A lunar eclipse occurs when the Moon moves into the Earth's shadow, causing the Moon to be darkened. A total lunar eclipse occurs when the Moon's near side entirely passes into the Earth's umbral shadow. Unlike a solar eclipse, which can only be viewed from a relatively small area of the world, a lunar eclipse may be viewed from anywhere on the night side of Earth. A total lunar eclipse can last up to nearly two hours, while a total solar eclipse lasts only a few minutes at any given place, because the Moon's shadow is smaller. Occurring about 2.3 days after apogee (on May 4, 2069, at 1:40 UTC), the Moon's apparent diameter will be smaller.

This lunar eclipse will be the third of an almost tetrad, with the others being on May 17, 2068 (partial); November 9, 2068 (total); and October 30, 2069 (total).

This will be the first central eclipse of Lunar Saros 132.

The Moon will also occult the bright star Alpha Librae as seen from the southern hemisphere a few hours before greatest eclipse.

== Visibility ==
The eclipse will be completely visible over western North America, Antarctica, and the eastern Pacific Ocean, seen rising over east Asia and Australia and setting over central and eastern North America and South America.

The moon's hourly motion across the Earth's shadow in the constellation of Libra.

== Eclipse details ==
Shown below is a table displaying details about this particular solar eclipse. It describes various parameters pertaining to this eclipse.

May 6, 2069 Lunar Eclipse Parameters
Parameter	Value
Penumbral Magnitude	2.39773
Umbral Magnitude	1.32418
Gamma	0.27172
Sun Right Ascension	02h55m56.2s
Sun Declination	+16°44'53.2"
Sun Semi-Diameter	15'51.4"
Sun Equatorial Horizontal Parallax	08.7"
Moon Right Ascension	14h56m07.8s
Moon Declination	-16°30'25.4"
Moon Semi-Diameter	14'46.2"
Moon Equatorial Horizontal Parallax	0°54'12.3"
ΔT	99.0 s

== Eclipse season ==
This eclipse is part of an eclipse season, a period, roughly every six months, when eclipses occur. Only two (or occasionally three) eclipse seasons occur each year, and each season lasts about 35 days and repeats just short of six months (173 days) later; thus two full eclipse seasons always occur each year. Either two or three eclipses happen each eclipse season. In the sequence below, each eclipse is separated by a fortnight. The first and last eclipse in this sequence is separated by one synodic month.

Eclipse season of April–May 2069
April 21 Descending node (new moon)	May 6 Ascending node (full moon)	May 20 Descending node (new moon)
Partial solar eclipse Solar Saros 120	Total lunar eclipse Lunar Saros 132	Partial solar eclipse Solar Saros 158

== Related eclipses ==
=== Eclipses in 2069 ===
- A partial solar eclipse on April 21.
- A total lunar eclipse on May 6.
- A partial solar eclipse on May 20.
- A partial solar eclipse on October 15.
- A total lunar eclipse on October 30.

=== Metonic ===
- Preceded by: Lunar eclipse of July 17, 2065
- Followed by: Lunar eclipse of February 22, 2073

=== Tzolkinex ===
- Preceded by: Lunar eclipse of March 25, 2062
- Followed by: Lunar eclipse of June 17, 2076

=== Half-Saros ===
- Preceded by: Solar eclipse of April 30, 2060
- Followed by: Solar eclipse of May 11, 2078

=== Tritos ===
- Preceded by: Lunar eclipse of June 6, 2058
- Followed by: Lunar eclipse of April 4, 2080

=== Lunar Saros 132 ===
- Preceded by: Lunar eclipse of April 26, 2051
- Followed by: Lunar eclipse of May 17, 2087

=== Inex ===
- Preceded by: Lunar eclipse of May 26, 2040
- Followed by: Lunar eclipse of April 15, 2098

=== Triad ===
- Preceded by: Lunar eclipse of July 6, 1982
- Followed by: Lunar eclipse of March 7, 2156

=== Lunar eclipses of 2067–2070 ===
This eclipse is a member of a semester series. An eclipse in a semester series of lunar eclipses repeats approximately every 177 days and 4 hours (a semester) at alternating nodes of the Moon's orbit.

The penumbral lunar eclipse on June 27, 2067 occurs in the previous lunar year eclipse set.

Lunar eclipse series sets from 2067 to 2070
Ascending node				Descending node			
Saros	Date Viewing	Type Chart	Gamma	Saros	Date Viewing	Type Chart	Gamma
112	2067 May 28	Penumbral	−1.2012	117	2067 Nov 21	Penumbral	1.2106
122	2068 May 17	Partial	−0.4851	127	2068 Nov 09	Total	0.4645
132	2069 May 06	Total	0.2717	137	2069 Oct 30	Total	−0.2263
142	2070 Apr 25	Penumbral	1.0044	147	2070 Oct 19	Partial	−0.9406

=== Metonic series ===
The Metonic cycle repeats nearly exactly every 19 years and represents a Saros cycle plus one lunar year. Because it occurs on the same calendar date, the Earth's shadow will in nearly the same location relative to the background stars.

This series has 9 events centered on May 6th and October 30th: (saros number)

Ascending node	Descending node
1. 2031 May 07.160 - penumbral (112); 2. 2050 May 06.937 - total (122); 3. 2069 May 06.380 - total (132); 4. 2088 May 05.677 - partial (142); 5. 2107 May 07.186 - penumbral (152)	1. 2031 Oct 30.323 - penumbral (117); 2. 2050 Oct 30.139 - total (127); 3. 2069 Oct 30.148 - total (137); 4. 2088 Oct 30.125 - partial (147)

=== Saros 132 ===
This eclipse is a part of Saros series 132, repeating every 18 years, 11 days, and containing 71 events. The series started with a penumbral lunar eclipse on May 12, 1492. It contains partial eclipses from August 16, 1636 through March 24, 1997; total eclipses from April 4, 2015 through August 2, 2213; and a second set of partial eclipses from August 13, 2231 through November 30, 2411. The series ends at member 71 as a penumbral eclipse on June 26, 2754.

The longest duration of totality will be produced by member 36 at 106 minutes, 6 seconds on June 9, 2123. All eclipses in this series occur at the Moon’s ascending node of orbit.

Greatest	First			
The greatest eclipse of the series will occur on 2123 Jun 09, lasting 106 minutes, 6 seconds.	Penumbral	Partial	Total	Central
The greatest eclipse of the series will occur on 2123 Jun 09, lasting 106 minutes, 6 seconds.	1492 May 12	1636 Aug 16	2015 Apr 04	2069 May 06
The greatest eclipse of the series will occur on 2123 Jun 09, lasting 106 minutes, 6 seconds.	Last			
The greatest eclipse of the series will occur on 2123 Jun 09, lasting 106 minutes, 6 seconds.	Central	Total	Partial	Penumbral
The greatest eclipse of the series will occur on 2123 Jun 09, lasting 106 minutes, 6 seconds.	2177 Jul 11	2213 Aug 02	2411 Nov 30	2754 Jun 26

Eclipses are tabulated in three columns; every third eclipse in the same column is one exeligmos apart, so they all cast shadows over approximately the same parts of the Earth.

Series members 19–40 occur between 1801 and 2200:
19	20	21
1816 Dec 04	1834 Dec 16	1852 Dec 26
22	23	24
1871 Jan 06	1889 Jan 17	1907 Jan 29
25	26	27
1925 Feb 08	1943 Feb 20	1961 Mar 02
28	29	30
1979 Mar 13	1997 Mar 24	2015 Apr 04
31	32	33
2033 Apr 14	2051 Apr 26	2069 May 06
34	35	36
2087 May 17	2105 May 28	2123 Jun 09
37	38	39
2141 Jun 19	2159 Jun 30	2177 Jul 11
40
2195 Jul 22

=== Tritos series ===
This eclipse is a part of a tritos cycle, repeating at alternating nodes every 135 synodic months (≈ 3986.63 days, or 11 years minus 1 month). Their appearance and longitude are irregular due to a lack of synchronization with the anomalistic month (period of perigee), but groupings of 3 tritos cycles (≈ 33 years minus 3 months) come close (≈ 434.044 anomalistic months), so eclipses are similar in these groupings.

Series members between 1801 and 2200
1807 May 21 (Saros 108)	1818 Apr 21 (Saros 109)	1829 Mar 20 (Saros 110)	1840 Feb 17 (Saros 111)	1851 Jan 17 (Saros 112)
1861 Dec 17 (Saros 113)	1872 Nov 15 (Saros 114)	1883 Oct 16 (Saros 115)	1894 Sep 15 (Saros 116)	1905 Aug 15 (Saros 117)
1916 Jul 15 (Saros 118)	1927 Jun 15 (Saros 119)	1938 May 14 (Saros 120)	1949 Apr 13 (Saros 121)	1960 Mar 13 (Saros 122)
1971 Feb 10 (Saros 123)	1982 Jan 09 (Saros 124)	1992 Dec 09 (Saros 125)	2003 Nov 09 (Saros 126)	2014 Oct 08 (Saros 127)
2025 Sep 07 (Saros 128)	2036 Aug 07 (Saros 129)	2047 Jul 07 (Saros 130)	2058 Jun 06 (Saros 131)	2069 May 06 (Saros 132)
2080 Apr 04 (Saros 133)	2091 Mar 05 (Saros 134)	2102 Feb 03 (Saros 135)	2113 Jan 02 (Saros 136)	2123 Dec 03 (Saros 137)
2134 Nov 02 (Saros 138)	2145 Sep 30 (Saros 139)	2156 Aug 30 (Saros 140)	2167 Aug 01 (Saros 141)	2178 Jun 30 (Saros 142)
2189 May 29 (Saros 143)	2200 Apr 30 (Saros 144)			

=== Inex series ===
This eclipse is a part of the long period inex cycle, repeating at alternating nodes, every 358 synodic months (≈ 10,571.95 days, or 29 years minus 20 days). Their appearance and longitude are irregular due to a lack of synchronization with the anomalistic month (period of perigee). However, groupings of 3 inex cycles (≈ 87 years minus 2 months) comes close (≈ 1,151.02 anomalistic months), so eclipses are similar in these groupings.

Series members between 1801 and 2200
1808 Nov 03 (Saros 123)	1837 Oct 13 (Saros 124)	1866 Sep 24 (Saros 125)
1895 Sep 04 (Saros 126)	1924 Aug 14 (Saros 127)	1953 Jul 26 (Saros 128)
1982 Jul 06 (Saros 129)	2011 Jun 15 (Saros 130)	2040 May 26 (Saros 131)
2069 May 06 (Saros 132)	2098 Apr 15 (Saros 133)	2127 Mar 28 (Saros 134)
2156 Mar 07 (Saros 135)	2185 Feb 14 (Saros 136)	

=== Half-Saros cycle ===
A lunar eclipse will be preceded and followed by solar eclipses by 9 years and 5.5 days (a half saros). This lunar eclipse is related to two total solar eclipses of Solar Saros 139.

April 30, 2060	May 11, 2078

== See also ==
- List of lunar eclipses and List of 21st-century lunar eclipses
