= March 1997 lunar eclipse =

Partial lunar eclipse March 24, 1997

- Partial eclipse
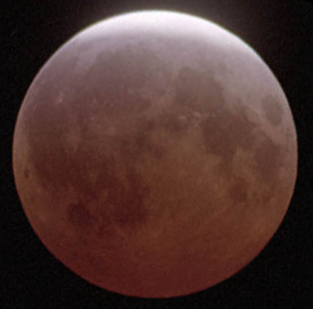
- Partiality as viewed from Hayward, California at 4:45 UTC
- Date: March 24, 1997
- Gamma: 0.4899
- Magnitude: 0.9195
- Saros cycle: 132 (29 of 71)
- Partiality: 203 minutes, 3 seconds
- Penumbral: 353 minutes, 54 seconds
Contacts (UTC)
- P1: 1:42:26
- U1: 2:57:55
- Greatest: 4:39:26
- U4: 6:20:58
- P4: 7:36:21

A partial lunar eclipse occurred at the Moon’s ascending node of orbit on Monday, March 24, 1997, with an umbral magnitude of 0.9195. A lunar eclipse occurs when the Moon moves into the Earth's shadow, causing the Moon to be darkened. A partial lunar eclipse occurs when one part of the Moon is in the Earth's umbra, while the other part is in the Earth's penumbra. Unlike a solar eclipse, which can only be viewed from a relatively small area of the world, a lunar eclipse may be viewed from anywhere on the night side of Earth. Occurring about 3.2 days after apogee (on March 20, 1997, at 23:40 UTC), the Moon's apparent diameter was smaller.

This lunar eclipse, a near total one, was the third of an almost tetrad, with the others being on April 4, 1996 (total); September 27, 1996 (total); and September 16, 1997 (total).

This was the last of the first set of partial eclipses in Lunar Saros 132.

== Visibility ==
The eclipse was completely visible over much of North America and South America, seen rising over western North America and the central Pacific Ocean and setting over Africa, Europe, and west and central Asia.

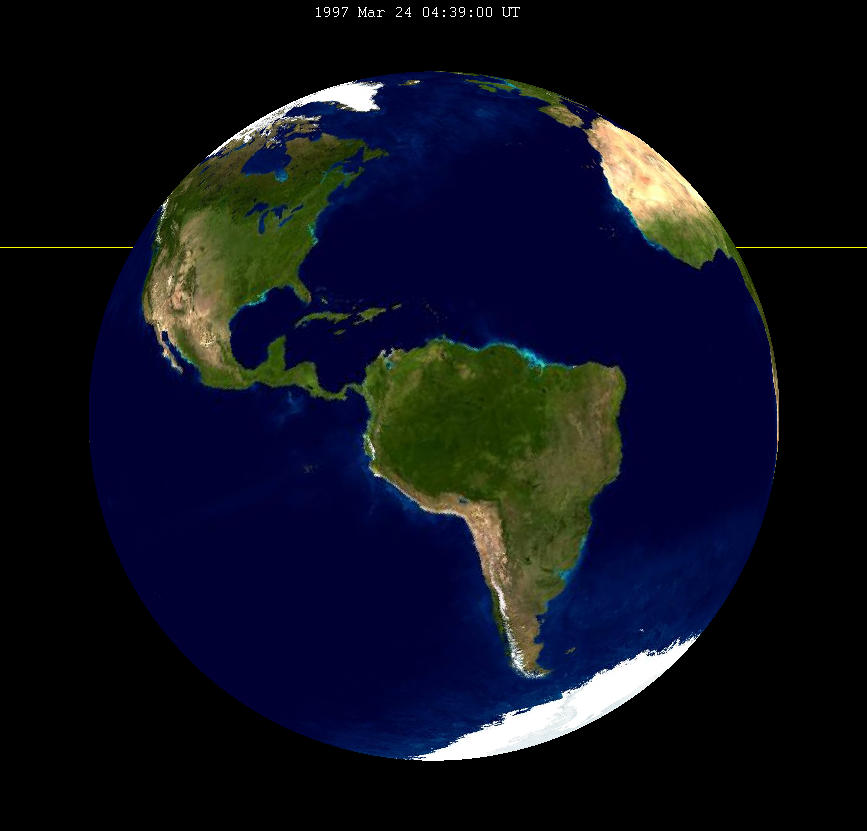
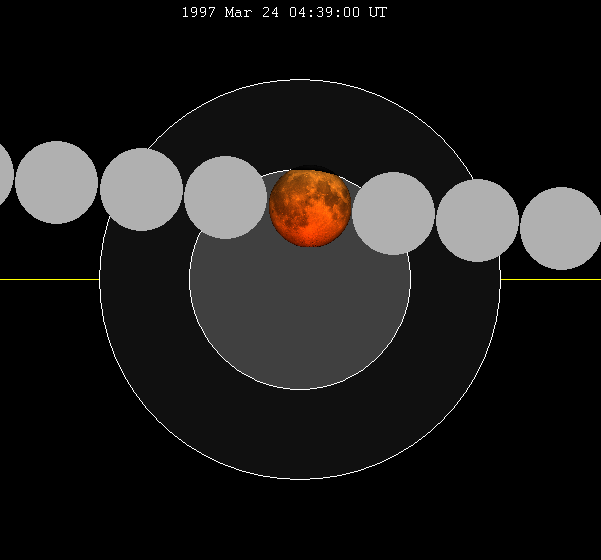

== Gallery ==
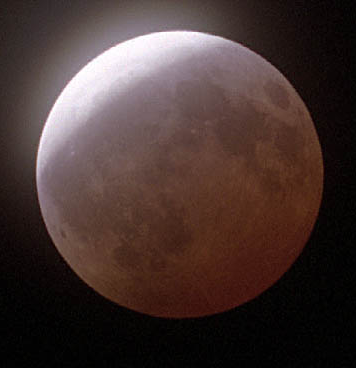
Hayward, California, 5:00 UT

== Eclipse details ==
Shown below is a table displaying details about this particular lunar eclipse. It describes various parameters pertaining to this eclipse.

March 24, 1997 Lunar Eclipse Parameters
Parameter	Value
Penumbral Magnitude	1.99936
Umbral Magnitude	0.91953
Gamma	0.48990
Sun Right Ascension	00h13m09.7s
Sun Declination	+01°25'31.5"
Sun Semi-Diameter	16'02.5"
Sun Equatorial Horizontal Parallax	08.8"
Moon Right Ascension	12h13m42.1s
Moon Declination	-01°00'04.5"
Moon Semi-Diameter	14'51.3"
Moon Equatorial Horizontal Parallax	0°54'31.3"
ΔT	62.4 s

== Eclipse season ==
This eclipse is part of an eclipse season, a period, roughly every six months, when eclipses occur. Only two (or occasionally three) eclipse seasons occur each year, and each season lasts about 35 days and repeats just short of six months (173 days) later; thus two full eclipse seasons always occur each year. Either two or three eclipses happen each eclipse season. In the sequence below, each eclipse is separated by a fortnight.

Eclipse season of March 1997
March 9 Descending node (new moon)	March 24 Ascending node (full moon)
Total solar eclipse Solar Saros 120	Partial lunar eclipse Lunar Saros 132

== Related eclipses ==
=== Eclipses in 1997 ===
- A total solar eclipse on March 9.
- A partial lunar eclipse on March 24.
- A partial solar eclipse on September 2.
- A total lunar eclipse on September 16.

=== Metonic ===
- Preceded by: Lunar eclipse of June 4, 1993
- Followed by: Lunar eclipse of January 9, 2001

=== Tzolkinex ===
- Preceded by: Lunar eclipse of February 9, 1990
- Followed by: Lunar eclipse of May 4, 2004

=== Half-Saros ===
- Preceded by: Solar eclipse of March 18, 1988
- Followed by: Solar eclipse of March 29, 2006

=== Tritos ===
- Preceded by: Lunar eclipse of April 24, 1986
- Followed by: Lunar eclipse of February 21, 2008

=== Lunar Saros 132 ===
- Preceded by: Lunar eclipse of March 13, 1979
- Followed by: Lunar eclipse of April 4, 2015

=== Inex ===
- Preceded by: Lunar eclipse of April 13, 1968
- Followed by: Lunar eclipse of March 3, 2026

=== Triad ===
- Preceded by: Lunar eclipse of May 24, 1910
- Followed by: Lunar eclipse of January 22, 2084

=== Lunar eclipses of 1995–1998 ===
This eclipse is a member of a semester series. An eclipse in a semester series of lunar eclipses repeats approximately every 177 days and 4 hours (a semester) at alternating nodes of the Moon's orbit.

The penumbral lunar eclipse on August 8, 1998 occurs in the next lunar year eclipse set.

Lunar eclipse series sets from 1995 to 1998
Ascending node				Descending node			
Saros	Date Viewing	Type Chart	Gamma	Saros	Date Viewing	Type Chart	Gamma
112	1995 Apr 15	Partial	−0.9594	117	1995 Oct 08	Penumbral	1.1179
122	1996 Apr 04	Total	−0.2534	127	1996 Sep 27	Total	0.3426
132	1997 Mar 24	Partial	0.4899	137	1997 Sep 16	Total	−0.3768
142	1998 Mar 13	Penumbral	1.1964	147	1998 Sep 06	Penumbral	−1.1058

=== Saros 132 ===
This eclipse is a part of Saros series 132, repeating every 18 years, 11 days, and containing 71 events. The series started with a penumbral lunar eclipse on May 12, 1492. It contains partial eclipses from August 16, 1636 through March 24, 1997; total eclipses from April 4, 2015 through August 2, 2213; and a second set of partial eclipses from August 13, 2231 through November 30, 2411. The series ends at member 71 as a penumbral eclipse on June 26, 2754.

The longest duration of totality will be produced by member 36 at 106 minutes, 6 seconds on June 9, 2123. All eclipses in this series occur at the Moon’s ascending node of orbit.

Greatest	First			
The greatest eclipse of the series will occur on 2123 Jun 09, lasting 106 minutes, 6 seconds.	Penumbral	Partial	Total	Central
The greatest eclipse of the series will occur on 2123 Jun 09, lasting 106 minutes, 6 seconds.	1492 May 12	1636 Aug 16	2015 Apr 04	2069 May 06
The greatest eclipse of the series will occur on 2123 Jun 09, lasting 106 minutes, 6 seconds.	Last			
The greatest eclipse of the series will occur on 2123 Jun 09, lasting 106 minutes, 6 seconds.	Central	Total	Partial	Penumbral
The greatest eclipse of the series will occur on 2123 Jun 09, lasting 106 minutes, 6 seconds.	2177 Jul 11	2213 Aug 02	2411 Nov 30	2754 Jun 26

Eclipses are tabulated in three columns; every third eclipse in the same column is one exeligmos apart, so they all cast shadows over approximately the same parts of the Earth.

Series members 19–40 occur between 1801 and 2200:
19	20	21
1816 Dec 04	1834 Dec 16	1852 Dec 26
22	23	24
1871 Jan 06	1889 Jan 17	1907 Jan 29
25	26	27
1925 Feb 08	1943 Feb 20	1961 Mar 02
28	29	30
1979 Mar 13	1997 Mar 24	2015 Apr 04
31	32	33
2033 Apr 14	2051 Apr 26	2069 May 06
34	35	36
2087 May 17	2105 May 28	2123 Jun 09
37	38	39
2141 Jun 19	2159 Jun 30	2177 Jul 11
40
2195 Jul 22

=== Tritos series ===
This eclipse is a part of a tritos cycle, repeating at alternating nodes every 135 synodic months (≈ 3986.63 days, or 11 years minus 1 month). Their appearance and longitude are irregular due to a lack of synchronization with the anomalistic month (period of perigee), but groupings of 3 tritos cycles (≈ 33 years minus 3 months) come close (≈ 434.044 anomalistic months), so eclipses are similar in these groupings.

Series members between 1801 and 2200
1811 Sep 02 (Saros 115)	1822 Aug 03 (Saros 116)	1833 Jul 02 (Saros 117)	1844 May 31 (Saros 118)	1855 May 02 (Saros 119)
1866 Mar 31 (Saros 120)	1877 Feb 27 (Saros 121)	1888 Jan 28 (Saros 122)	1898 Dec 27 (Saros 123)	1909 Nov 27 (Saros 124)
1920 Oct 27 (Saros 125)	1931 Sep 26 (Saros 126)	1942 Aug 26 (Saros 127)	1953 Jul 26 (Saros 128)	1964 Jun 25 (Saros 129)
1975 May 25 (Saros 130)	1986 Apr 24 (Saros 131)	1997 Mar 24 (Saros 132)	2008 Feb 21 (Saros 133)	2019 Jan 21 (Saros 134)
2029 Dec 20 (Saros 135)	2040 Nov 18 (Saros 136)	2051 Oct 19 (Saros 137)	2062 Sep 18 (Saros 138)	2073 Aug 17 (Saros 139)
2084 Jul 17 (Saros 140)	2095 Jun 17 (Saros 141)	2106 May 17 (Saros 142)	2117 Apr 16 (Saros 143)	2128 Mar 16 (Saros 144)
2139 Feb 13 (Saros 145)	2150 Jan 13 (Saros 146)	2160 Dec 13 (Saros 147)	2171 Nov 12 (Saros 148)	2182 Oct 11 (Saros 149)
2193 Sep 11 (Saros 150)

=== Inex series ===
This eclipse is a part of the long period inex cycle, repeating at alternating nodes, every 358 synodic months (≈ 10,571.95 days, or 29 years minus 20 days). Their appearance and longitude are irregular due to a lack of synchronization with the anomalistic month (period of perigee). However, groupings of 3 inex cycles (≈ 87 years minus 2 months) comes close (≈ 1,151.02 anomalistic months), so eclipses are similar in these groupings.

Series members between 1801 and 2200
1823 Jul 23 (Saros 126)	1852 Jul 01 (Saros 127)	1881 Jun 12 (Saros 128)
1910 May 24 (Saros 129)	1939 May 03 (Saros 130)	1968 Apr 13 (Saros 131)
1997 Mar 24 (Saros 132)	2026 Mar 03 (Saros 133)	2055 Feb 11 (Saros 134)
2084 Jan 22 (Saros 135)	2113 Jan 02 (Saros 136)	2141 Dec 13 (Saros 137)
2170 Nov 23 (Saros 138)	2199 Nov 02 (Saros 139)	

=== Half-Saros cycle ===
A lunar eclipse will be preceded and followed by solar eclipses by 9 years and 5.5 days (a half saros). This lunar eclipse is related to two total solar eclipses of Solar Saros 139.

March 18, 1988	March 29, 2006

== See also ==
- List of lunar eclipses
- List of 20th-century lunar eclipses
