= April 2051 lunar eclipse =

Astronomical event

- Total eclipse
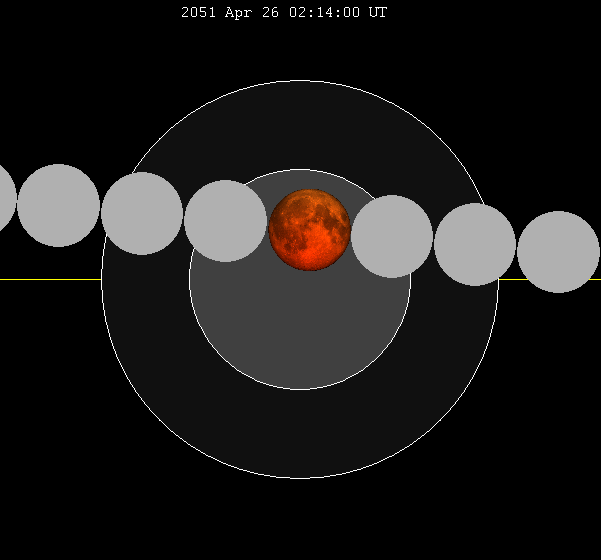
- The Moon's hourly motion shown right to left
- Date: April 26, 2051
- Gamma: 0.3371
- Magnitude: 1.2034
- Saros cycle: 132 (32 of 71)
- Totality: 69 minutes, 35 seconds
- Partiality: 220 minutes, 51 seconds
- Penumbral: 364 minutes, 48 seconds
Contacts (UTC)
- P1: 23:12:27
- U1: 0:24:27
- U2: 1:40:05
- Greatest: 2:14:52
- U3: 2:49:40
- U4: 4:05:18
- P4: 5:17:14

A total lunar eclipse will occur at the Moon’s ascending node of orbit on Wednesday, April 26, 2051, with an umbral magnitude of 1.2034. A lunar eclipse occurs when the Moon moves into the Earth's shadow, causing the Moon to be darkened. A total lunar eclipse occurs when the Moon's near side entirely passes into the Earth's umbral shadow. Unlike a solar eclipse, which can only be viewed from a relatively small area of the world, a lunar eclipse may be viewed from anywhere on the night side of Earth. A total lunar eclipse can last up to nearly two hours, while a total solar eclipse lasts only a few minutes at any given place, because the Moon's shadow is smaller. Occurring about 2.6 days after apogee (on April 23, 2051, at 12:00 UTC), the Moon's apparent diameter will be smaller.

This lunar eclipse is the third of a tetrad, with four total lunar eclipses in series, the others being on May 6, 2050; October 30, 2050; and October 19, 2051.

== Visibility ==
The eclipse will be completely visible over South America and west Africa, seen rising over North America and the eastern Pacific Ocean and setting over central and east Africa, Europe, and west, central, and south Asia.

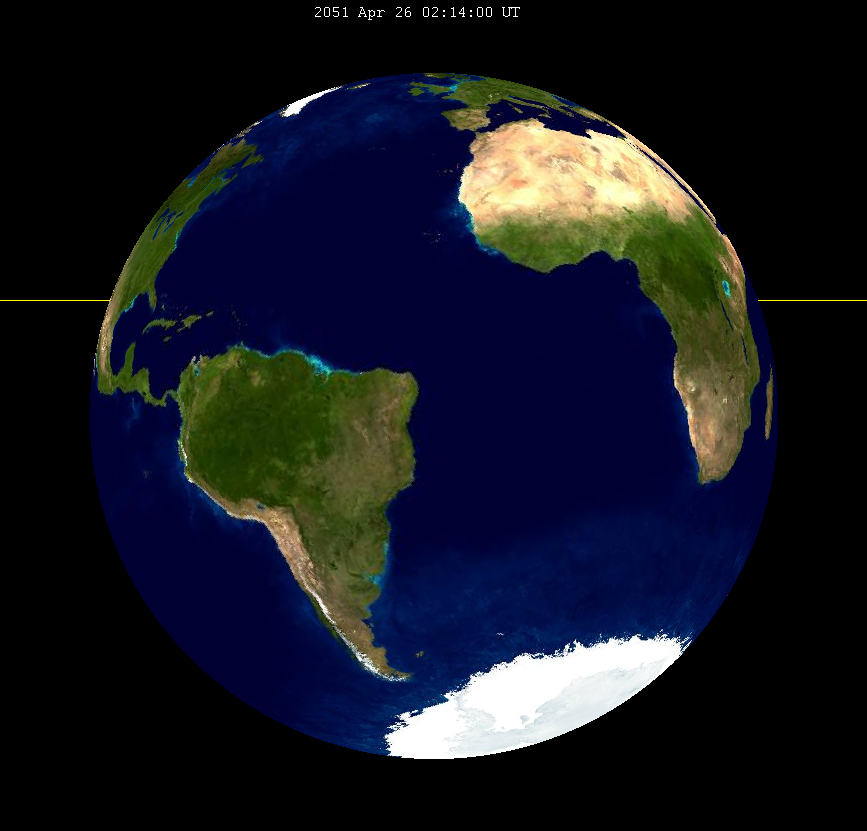
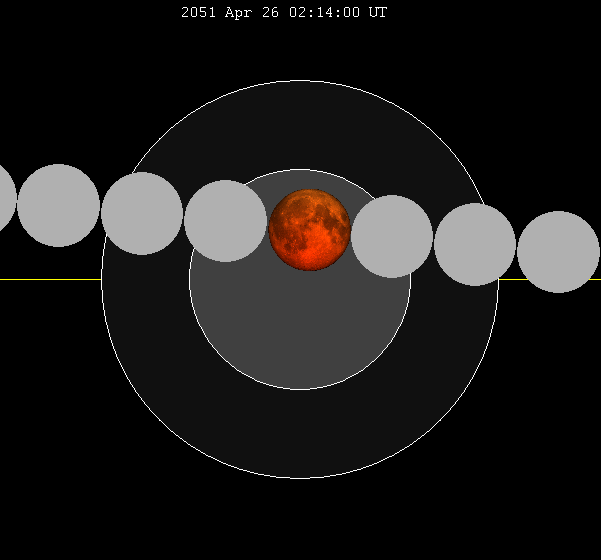

== Eclipse details ==
Shown below is a table displaying details about this particular solar eclipse. It describes various parameters pertaining to this eclipse.

April 26, 2051 Lunar Eclipse Parameters
Parameter	Value
Penumbral Magnitude	2.27848
Umbral Magnitude	1.20339
Gamma	0.33710
Sun Right Ascension	02h14m06.4s
Sun Declination	+13°27'39.8"
Sun Semi-Diameter	15'53.9"
Sun Equatorial Horizontal Parallax	08.7"
Moon Right Ascension	14h14m24.0s
Moon Declination	-13°09'52.9"
Moon Semi-Diameter	14'47.3"
Moon Equatorial Horizontal Parallax	0°54'16.4"
ΔT	85.9 s

== Eclipse season ==
This eclipse is part of an eclipse season, a period, roughly every six months, when eclipses occur. Only two (or occasionally three) eclipse seasons occur each year, and each season lasts about 35 days and repeats just short of six months (173 days) later; thus two full eclipse seasons always occur each year. Either two or three eclipses happen each eclipse season. In the sequence below, each eclipse is separated by a fortnight.

Eclipse season of April 2051
April 11 Descending node (new moon)	April 26 Ascending node (full moon)
Partial solar eclipse Solar Saros 120	Total lunar eclipse Lunar Saros 132

== Related eclipses ==
=== Eclipses in 2051 ===
- A partial solar eclipse on April 11.
- A total lunar eclipse on April 26.
- A partial solar eclipse on October 4.
- A total lunar eclipse on October 19.

=== Metonic ===
- Preceded by: Lunar eclipse of July 7, 2047
- Followed by: Lunar eclipse of February 11, 2055

=== Tzolkinex ===
- Preceded by: Lunar eclipse of March 13, 2044
- Followed by: Lunar eclipse of June 6, 2058

=== Half-Saros ===
- Preceded by: Solar eclipse of April 20, 2042
- Followed by: Solar eclipse of April 30, 2060

=== Tritos ===
- Preceded by: Lunar eclipse of May 26, 2040
- Followed by: Lunar eclipse of March 25, 2062

=== Lunar Saros 132 ===
- Preceded by: Lunar eclipse of April 14, 2033
- Followed by: Lunar eclipse of May 6, 2069

=== Inex ===
- Preceded by: Lunar eclipse of May 16, 2022
- Followed by: Lunar eclipse of April 4, 2080

=== Triad ===
- Preceded by: Lunar eclipse of June 25, 1964
- Followed by: Lunar eclipse of February 24, 2138

=== Lunar eclipses of 2049–2052 ===
This eclipse is a member of a semester series. An eclipse in a semester series of lunar eclipses repeats approximately every 177 days and 4 hours (a semester) at alternating nodes of the Moon's orbit.

The penumbral lunar eclipse on June 15, 2049 occurs in the previous lunar year eclipse set.

Lunar eclipse series sets from 2049 to 2052
Ascending node				Descending node			
Saros	Date Viewing	Type Chart	Gamma	Saros	Date Viewing	Type Chart	Gamma
112	2049 May 17	Penumbral	−1.1337	117	2049 Nov 09	Penumbral	1.1964
122	2050 May 06	Total	−0.4181	127	2050 Oct 30	Total	0.4435
132	2051 Apr 26	Total	0.3371	137	2051 Oct 19	Total	−0.2542
142	2052 Apr 14	Penumbral	1.0628	147	2052 Oct 08	Partial	−0.9726

=== Saros 132 ===
This eclipse is a part of Saros series 132, repeating every 18 years, 11 days, and containing 71 events. The series started with a penumbral lunar eclipse on May 12, 1492. It contains partial eclipses from August 16, 1636 through March 24, 1997; total eclipses from April 4, 2015 through August 2, 2213; and a second set of partial eclipses from August 13, 2231 through November 30, 2411. The series ends at member 71 as a penumbral eclipse on June 26, 2754.

The longest duration of totality will be produced by member 36 at 106 minutes, 6 seconds on June 9, 2123. All eclipses in this series occur at the Moon’s ascending node of orbit.

Greatest	First			
The greatest eclipse of the series will occur on 2123 Jun 09, lasting 106 minutes, 6 seconds.	Penumbral	Partial	Total	Central
The greatest eclipse of the series will occur on 2123 Jun 09, lasting 106 minutes, 6 seconds.	1492 May 12	1636 Aug 16	2015 Apr 04	2069 May 06
The greatest eclipse of the series will occur on 2123 Jun 09, lasting 106 minutes, 6 seconds.	Last			
The greatest eclipse of the series will occur on 2123 Jun 09, lasting 106 minutes, 6 seconds.	Central	Total	Partial	Penumbral
The greatest eclipse of the series will occur on 2123 Jun 09, lasting 106 minutes, 6 seconds.	2177 Jul 11	2213 Aug 02	2411 Nov 30	2754 Jun 26

Eclipses are tabulated in three columns; every third eclipse in the same column is one exeligmos apart, so they all cast shadows over approximately the same parts of the Earth.

Series members 19–40 occur between 1801 and 2200:
19	20	21
1816 Dec 04	1834 Dec 16	1852 Dec 26
22	23	24
1871 Jan 06	1889 Jan 17	1907 Jan 29
25	26	27
1925 Feb 08	1943 Feb 20	1961 Mar 02
28	29	30
1979 Mar 13	1997 Mar 24	2015 Apr 04
31	32	33
2033 Apr 14	2051 Apr 26	2069 May 06
34	35	36
2087 May 17	2105 May 28	2123 Jun 09
37	38	39
2141 Jun 19	2159 Jun 30	2177 Jul 11
40
2195 Jul 22

=== Tritos series ===
This eclipse is a part of a tritos cycle, repeating at alternating nodes every 135 synodic months (≈ 3986.63 days, or 11 years minus 1 month). Their appearance and longitude are irregular due to a lack of synchronization with the anomalistic month (period of perigee), but groupings of 3 tritos cycles (≈ 33 years minus 3 months) come close (≈ 434.044 anomalistic months), so eclipses are similar in these groupings.

Series members between 1801 and 2200
1811 Mar 10 (Saros 110)	1822 Feb 06 (Saros 111)	1833 Jan 06 (Saros 112)	1843 Dec 07 (Saros 113)	1854 Nov 04 (Saros 114)
1865 Oct 04 (Saros 115)	1876 Sep 03 (Saros 116)	1887 Aug 03 (Saros 117)	1898 Jul 03 (Saros 118)	1909 Jun 04 (Saros 119)
1920 May 03 (Saros 120)	1931 Apr 02 (Saros 121)	1942 Mar 03 (Saros 122)	1953 Jan 29 (Saros 123)	1963 Dec 30 (Saros 124)
1974 Nov 29 (Saros 125)	1985 Oct 28 (Saros 126)	1996 Sep 27 (Saros 127)	2007 Aug 28 (Saros 128)	2018 Jul 27 (Saros 129)
2029 Jun 26 (Saros 130)	2040 May 26 (Saros 131)	2051 Apr 26 (Saros 132)	2062 Mar 25 (Saros 133)	2073 Feb 22 (Saros 134)
2084 Jan 22 (Saros 135)	2094 Dec 21 (Saros 136)	2105 Nov 21 (Saros 137)	2116 Oct 21 (Saros 138)	2127 Sep 20 (Saros 139)
2138 Aug 20 (Saros 140)	2149 Jul 20 (Saros 141)	2160 Jun 18 (Saros 142)	2171 May 19 (Saros 143)	2182 Apr 18 (Saros 144)
2193 Mar 17 (Saros 145)

=== Inex series ===
This eclipse is a part of the long period inex cycle, repeating at alternating nodes, every 358 synodic months (≈ 10,571.95 days, or 29 years minus 20 days). Their appearance and longitude are irregular due to a lack of synchronization with the anomalistic month (period of perigee). However, groupings of 3 inex cycles (≈ 87 years minus 2 months) comes close (≈ 1,151.02 anomalistic months), so eclipses are similar in these groupings.

Series members between 1801 and 2200
1819 Oct 03 (Saros 124)	1848 Sep 13 (Saros 125)	1877 Aug 23 (Saros 126)
1906 Aug 04 (Saros 127)	1935 Jul 16 (Saros 128)	1964 Jun 25 (Saros 129)
1993 Jun 04 (Saros 130)	2022 May 16 (Saros 131)	2051 Apr 26 (Saros 132)
2080 Apr 04 (Saros 133)	2109 Mar 17 (Saros 134)	2138 Feb 24 (Saros 135)
2167 Feb 04 (Saros 136)	2196 Jan 15 (Saros 137)	

=== Half-Saros cycle ===
A lunar eclipse will be preceded and followed by solar eclipses by 9 years and 5.5 days (a half saros). This lunar eclipse is related to two total solar eclipses of Solar Saros 139.

April 20, 2042	April 30, 2060

== See also ==
- List of lunar eclipses and List of 21st-century lunar eclipses
