= March 1979 lunar eclipse =

Partial lunar eclipse March 13, 1979

- Partial eclipse
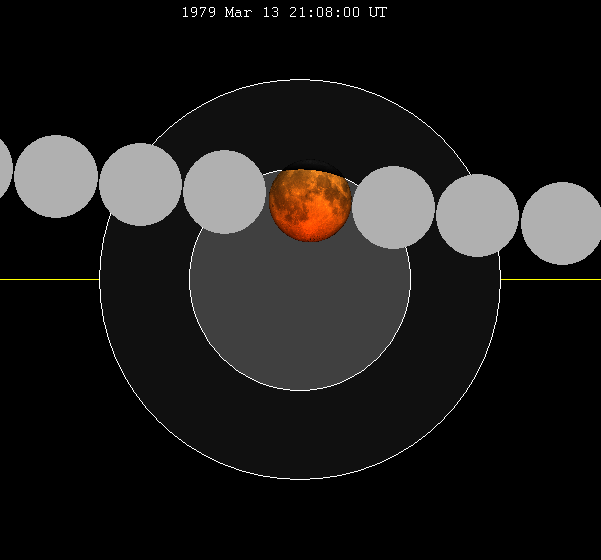
- The Moon's hourly motion shown right to left
- Date: March 13, 1979
- Gamma: 0.5254
- Magnitude: 0.8538
- Saros cycle: 132 (28 of 71)
- Partiality: 197 minutes, 39 seconds
- Penumbral: 350 minutes, 37 seconds
Contacts (UTC)
- P1: 18:12:42
- U1: 19:29:14
- Greatest: 21:08:02
- U4: 22:46:53
- P4: 0:03:19

A partial lunar eclipse occurred at the Moon’s ascending node of orbit on Tuesday, March 13, 1979, with an umbral magnitude of 0.8538. A lunar eclipse occurs when the Moon moves into the Earth's shadow, causing the Moon to be darkened. A partial lunar eclipse occurs when one part of the Moon is in the Earth's umbra, while the other part is in the Earth's penumbra. Unlike a solar eclipse, which can only be viewed from a relatively small area of the world, a lunar eclipse may be viewed from anywhere on the night side of Earth. Occurring about 3.5 days after apogee (on March 10, 1979, at 10:20 UTC), the Moon's apparent diameter was smaller.

== Visibility ==
The eclipse was completely visible over much of Africa, Europe, and the western half of Asia, seen rising over eastern North America, South America, and west Africa and setting over east and northeast Asia and Australia.

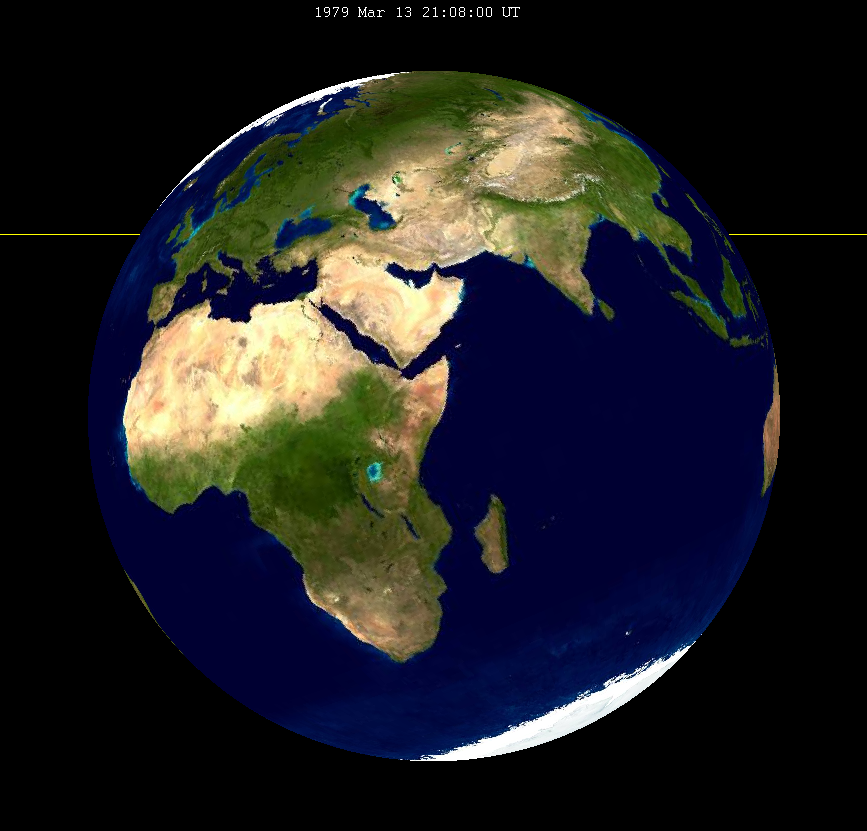
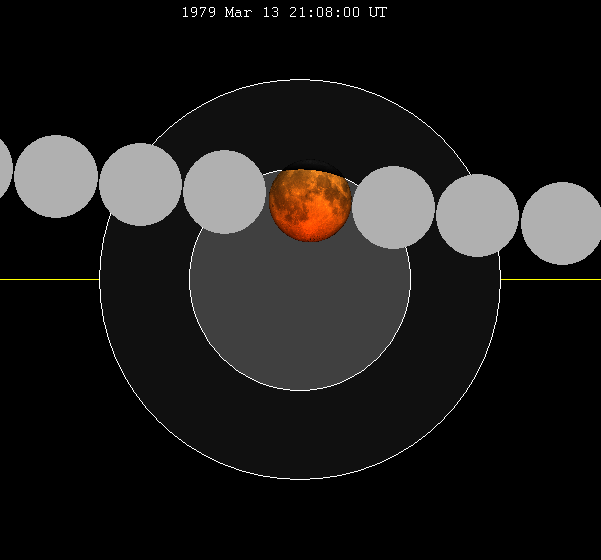

== Eclipse details ==
Shown below is a table displaying details about this particular solar eclipse. It describes various parameters pertaining to this eclipse.

March 13, 1979 Lunar Eclipse Parameters
Parameter	Value
Penumbral Magnitude	1.93496
Umbral Magnitude	0.85377
Gamma	0.52537
Sun Right Ascension	23h33m09.8s
Sun Declination	-02°53'59.0"
Sun Semi-Diameter	16'05.4"
Sun Equatorial Horizontal Parallax	08.8"
Moon Right Ascension	11h33m44.4s
Moon Declination	+03°21'20.5"
Moon Semi-Diameter	14'52.9"
Moon Equatorial Horizontal Parallax	0°54'36.9"
ΔT	49.7 s

== Eclipse season ==
This eclipse is part of an eclipse season, a period, roughly every six months, when eclipses occur. Only two (or occasionally three) eclipse seasons occur each year, and each season lasts about 35 days and repeats just short of six months (173 days) later; thus two full eclipse seasons always occur each year. Either two or three eclipses happen each eclipse season. In the sequence below, each eclipse is separated by a fortnight.

Eclipse season of February–March 1979
February 26 Descending node (new moon)	March 13 Ascending node (full moon)
Total solar eclipse Solar Saros 120	Partial lunar eclipse Lunar Saros 132

== Related eclipses ==
=== Eclipses in 1979 ===
- A total solar eclipse on February 26.
- A partial lunar eclipse on March 13.
- An annular solar eclipse on August 22.
- A total lunar eclipse on September 6.

=== Metonic ===
- Preceded by: Lunar eclipse of May 25, 1975
- Followed by: Lunar eclipse of December 30, 1982

=== Tzolkinex ===
- Preceded by: Lunar eclipse of January 30, 1972
- Followed by: Lunar eclipse of April 24, 1986

=== Half-Saros ===
- Preceded by: Solar eclipse of March 7, 1970
- Followed by: Solar eclipse of March 18, 1988

=== Tritos ===
- Preceded by: Lunar eclipse of April 13, 1968
- Followed by: Lunar eclipse of February 9, 1990

=== Lunar Saros 132 ===
- Preceded by: Lunar eclipse of March 2, 1961
- Followed by: Lunar eclipse of March 24, 1997

=== Inex ===
- Preceded by: Lunar eclipse of April 2, 1950
- Followed by: Lunar eclipse of February 21, 2008

=== Triad ===
- Preceded by: Lunar eclipse of May 11, 1892
- Followed by: Lunar eclipse of January 11, 2066

=== Lunar eclipses of 1977–1980 ===
This eclipse is a member of a semester series. An eclipse in a semester series of lunar eclipses repeats approximately every 177 days and 4 hours (a semester) at alternating nodes of the Moon's orbit.

The penumbral lunar eclipse on July 27, 1980 occurs in the next lunar year eclipse set.

Lunar eclipse series sets from 1977 to 1980
Ascending node				Descending node			
Saros	Date Viewing	Type Chart	Gamma	Saros	Date Viewing	Type Chart	Gamma
112	1977 Apr 04	Partial	−0.9148	117	1977 Sep 27	Penumbral	1.0768
122	1978 Mar 24	Total	−0.2140	127	1978 Sep 16	Total	0.2951
132	1979 Mar 13	Partial	0.5254	137	1979 Sep 06	Total	−0.4305
142	1980 Mar 01	Penumbral	1.2270	147	1980 Aug 26	Penumbral	−1.1608

=== Saros 132 ===
This eclipse is a part of Saros series 132, repeating every 18 years, 11 days, and containing 71 events. The series started with a penumbral lunar eclipse on May 12, 1492. It contains partial eclipses from August 16, 1636 through March 24, 1997; total eclipses from April 4, 2015 through August 2, 2213; and a second set of partial eclipses from August 13, 2231 through November 30, 2411. The series ends at member 71 as a penumbral eclipse on June 26, 2754.

The longest duration of totality will be produced by member 36 at 106 minutes, 6 seconds on June 9, 2123. All eclipses in this series occur at the Moon’s ascending node of orbit.

Greatest	First			
The greatest eclipse of the series will occur on 2123 Jun 09, lasting 106 minutes, 6 seconds.	Penumbral	Partial	Total	Central
The greatest eclipse of the series will occur on 2123 Jun 09, lasting 106 minutes, 6 seconds.	1492 May 12	1636 Aug 16	2015 Apr 04	2069 May 06
The greatest eclipse of the series will occur on 2123 Jun 09, lasting 106 minutes, 6 seconds.	Last			
The greatest eclipse of the series will occur on 2123 Jun 09, lasting 106 minutes, 6 seconds.	Central	Total	Partial	Penumbral
The greatest eclipse of the series will occur on 2123 Jun 09, lasting 106 minutes, 6 seconds.	2177 Jul 11	2213 Aug 02	2411 Nov 30	2754 Jun 26

Eclipses are tabulated in three columns; every third eclipse in the same column is one exeligmos apart, so they all cast shadows over approximately the same parts of the Earth.

Series members 19–40 occur between 1801 and 2200:
19	20	21
1816 Dec 04	1834 Dec 16	1852 Dec 26
22	23	24
1871 Jan 06	1889 Jan 17	1907 Jan 29
25	26	27
1925 Feb 08	1943 Feb 20	1961 Mar 02
28	29	30
1979 Mar 13	1997 Mar 24	2015 Apr 04
31	32	33
2033 Apr 14	2051 Apr 26	2069 May 06
34	35	36
2087 May 17	2105 May 28	2123 Jun 09
37	38	39
2141 Jun 19	2159 Jun 30	2177 Jul 11
40
2195 Jul 22

=== Tritos series ===
This eclipse is a part of a tritos cycle, repeating at alternating nodes every 135 synodic months (≈ 3986.63 days, or 11 years minus 1 month). Their appearance and longitude are irregular due to a lack of synchronization with the anomalistic month (period of perigee), but groupings of 3 tritos cycles (≈ 33 years minus 3 months) come close (≈ 434.044 anomalistic months), so eclipses are similar in these groupings.

Series members between 1801 and 2200
1804 Jul 22 (Saros 116)	1815 Jun 21 (Saros 117)	1826 May 21 (Saros 118)	1837 Apr 20 (Saros 119)	1848 Mar 19 (Saros 120)
1859 Feb 17 (Saros 121)	1870 Jan 17 (Saros 122)	1880 Dec 16 (Saros 123)	1891 Nov 16 (Saros 124)	1902 Oct 17 (Saros 125)
1913 Sep 15 (Saros 126)	1924 Aug 14 (Saros 127)	1935 Jul 16 (Saros 128)	1946 Jun 14 (Saros 129)	1957 May 13 (Saros 130)
1968 Apr 13 (Saros 131)	1979 Mar 13 (Saros 132)	1990 Feb 09 (Saros 133)	2001 Jan 09 (Saros 134)	2011 Dec 10 (Saros 135)
2022 Nov 08 (Saros 136)	2033 Oct 08 (Saros 137)	2044 Sep 07 (Saros 138)	2055 Aug 07 (Saros 139)	2066 Jul 07 (Saros 140)
2077 Jun 06 (Saros 141)	2088 May 05 (Saros 142)	2099 Apr 05 (Saros 143)	2110 Mar 06 (Saros 144)	2121 Feb 02 (Saros 145)
2132 Jan 02 (Saros 146)	2142 Dec 03 (Saros 147)	2153 Nov 01 (Saros 148)	2164 Sep 30 (Saros 149)	2175 Aug 31 (Saros 150)
2186 Jul 31 (Saros 151)	2197 Jun 29 (Saros 152)			

=== Inex series ===
This eclipse is a part of the long period inex cycle, repeating at alternating nodes, every 358 synodic months (≈ 10,571.95 days, or 29 years minus 20 days). Their appearance and longitude are irregular due to a lack of synchronization with the anomalistic month (period of perigee). However, groupings of 3 inex cycles (≈ 87 years minus 2 months) comes close (≈ 1,151.02 anomalistic months), so eclipses are similar in these groupings.

Series members between 1801 and 2200
1805 Jul 11 (Saros 126)	1834 Jun 21 (Saros 127)	1863 Jun 01 (Saros 128)
1892 May 11 (Saros 129)	1921 Apr 22 (Saros 130)	1950 Apr 02 (Saros 131)
1979 Mar 13 (Saros 132)	2008 Feb 21 (Saros 133)	2037 Jan 31 (Saros 134)
2066 Jan 11 (Saros 135)	2094 Dec 21 (Saros 136)	2123 Dec 03 (Saros 137)
2152 Nov 12 (Saros 138)	2181 Oct 22 (Saros 139)	

=== Half-Saros cycle ===
A lunar eclipse will be preceded and followed by solar eclipses by 9 years and 5.5 days (a half saros). This lunar eclipse is related to two total solar eclipses of Solar Saros 139.

March 7, 1970	March 18, 1988

== See also ==
- List of lunar eclipses
- List of 20th-century lunar eclipses
