= June 2123 lunar eclipse =

Spectacular long central lunar eclipse

- Total eclipse
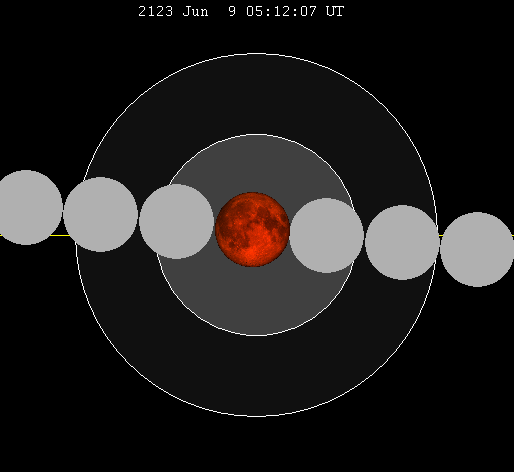
- The Moon's hourly motion shown right to left
- Date: June 9, 2123
- Gamma: 0.0406
- Magnitude: 1.7488
- Saros cycle: 132 (36 of 71)
- Totality: 106 minutes, 6 seconds
- Partiality: 235 minutes, 47 seconds
- Penumbral: 374 minutes, 23 seconds
Contacts (UTC)
- P1: 1:56:43
- U1: 3:06:02
- U2: 4:10:52
- Greatest: 5:03:55
- U3: 5:56:58
- U4: 7:01:48
- P4: 8:11:06

A total lunar eclipse will occur at the Moon’s ascending node of orbit on Wednesday, June 9, 2123, with an umbral magnitude of 1.7488. It will be a central lunar eclipse, in which part of the Moon will pass through the center of the Earth's shadow. A lunar eclipse occurs when the Moon moves into the Earth's shadow, causing the Moon to be darkened. A total lunar eclipse occurs when the Moon's near side entirely passes into the Earth's umbral shadow. Unlike a solar eclipse, which can only be viewed from a relatively small area of the world, a lunar eclipse may be viewed from anywhere on the night side of Earth. A total lunar eclipse can last up to nearly two hours, while a total solar eclipse lasts only a few minutes at any given place, because the Moon's shadow is smaller. Occurring about 1.4 days after apogee (on June 7, 2123, at 19:20 UTC), the Moon's apparent diameter will be smaller.

This dramatic total eclipse, lasting 106 minutes and 6 seconds, will plunge the full Moon into deep darkness as it passes right through the center of the Earth's umbral shadow. While the visual effect of a total eclipse is variable, the Moon may be stained a deep orange or red colour at maximum eclipse. This will be a great spectacle for everyone who sees it. The partial eclipse will last for 3 hours and 56 minutes in total. The penumbral eclipse lasts for 6 hours and 14 minutes. This will be the longest total lunar eclipse since July 16, 2000 (106 minutes, 25 seconds), and the longest one until May 12, 2264 (106 minutes, 13 seconds) and July 27, 3107 (106 minutes, 21 seconds), though the eclipse on June 19, 2141 will be nearly identical in all aspects. This will also be the longest of the 22nd century and the second longest of the 3rd millennium. The eclipse on June 19, 2141 will be the second longest of the 22nd century and the third longest of the third millennium (at 106 minutes 5 seconds).

== Visibility ==
The eclipse will be completely visible over eastern and central North America, South America, and Antarctica, seen rising over western North America, eastern Australia, and the central Pacific Ocean and setting over Europe, Africa, and the Middle East.

== Eclipse details ==
Shown below is a table displaying details about this particular solar eclipse. It describes various parameters pertaining to this eclipse.

June 9, 2123 Lunar Eclipse Parameters
Parameter	Value
Penumbral Magnitude	2.81895
Umbral Magnitude	1.74877
Gamma	0.04055
Sun Right Ascension	05h07m45.7s
Sun Declination	+22°52'47.0"
Sun Semi-Diameter	15'45.7"
Sun Equatorial Horizontal Parallax	08.7"
Moon Right Ascension	17h07m45.6s
Moon Declination	-22°50'35.5"
Moon Semi-Diameter	14'43.7"
Moon Equatorial Horizontal Parallax	0°54'03.0"
ΔT	153.5 s

== Eclipse season ==
This eclipse is part of an eclipse season, a period, roughly every six months, when eclipses occur. Only two (or occasionally three) eclipse seasons occur each year, and each season lasts about 35 days and repeats just short of six months (173 days) later; thus two full eclipse seasons always occur each year. Either two or three eclipses happen each eclipse season. In the sequence below, each eclipse is separated by a fortnight. The first and last eclipse in this sequence is separated by one synodic month.

Eclipse season of May–June 2123
May 25 Descending node (new moon)	June 9 Ascending node (full moon)	June 23 Descending node (new moon)
Partial solar eclipse Solar Saros 120	Total lunar eclipse Lunar Saros 132	Partial solar eclipse Solar Saros 158

== Related eclipses ==
=== Eclipses in 2123 ===
- A partial solar eclipse on May 25.
- A total lunar eclipse on June 9.
- A partial solar eclipse on June 23.
- A partial solar eclipse on November 18.
- A total lunar eclipse on December 3.

=== Metonic ===
- Preceded by: Lunar eclipse of August 20, 2119
- Followed by: Lunar eclipse of March 28, 2127

=== Tzolkinex ===
- Preceded by: Lunar eclipse of April 27, 2116
- Followed by: Lunar eclipse of July 21, 2130

=== Half-Saros ===
- Preceded by: Solar eclipse of June 3, 2114
- Followed by: Solar eclipse of June 13, 2132

=== Tritos ===
- Preceded by: Lunar eclipse of July 9, 2112
- Followed by: Lunar eclipse of May 8, 2134

=== Lunar Saros 132 ===
- Preceded by: Lunar eclipse of May 28, 2105
- Followed by: Lunar eclipse of June 19, 2141

=== Inex ===
- Preceded by: Lunar eclipse of June 28, 2094
- Followed by: Lunar eclipse of May 18, 2152

=== Triad ===
- Preceded by: Lunar eclipse of August 7, 2036
- Followed by: Lunar eclipse of April 10, 2210

=== Lunar eclipses of 2121–2125 ===
This eclipse is a member of a semester series. An eclipse in a semester series of lunar eclipses repeats approximately every 177 days and 4 hours (a semester) at alternating nodes of the Moon's orbit.

The penumbral lunar eclipses on February 2, 2121 and July 30, 2121 occur in the previous lunar year eclipse set, and the penumbral lunar eclipses on April 18, 2125 and October 12, 2125 occur in the next lunar year eclipse set.

Lunar eclipse series sets from 2121 to 2125
Ascending node				Descending node			
Saros	Date Viewing	Type Chart	Gamma	Saros	Date Viewing	Type Chart	Gamma
112	2121 Jun 30	Penumbral	−1.4272	117	2121 Dec 24	Penumbral	1.2261
122	2122 Jun 20	Partial	−0.7177	127	2122 Dec 13	Partial	0.4979
132	2123 Jun 09	Total	0.0406	137	2123 Dec 03	Total	−0.1755
142	2124 May 28	Partial	0.7913	147	2124 Nov 21	Partial	−0.8808
152	2125 May 17	Penumbral	1.4923				

=== Saros 132 ===
This eclipse is a part of Saros series 132, repeating every 18 years, 11 days, and containing 71 events. The series started with a penumbral lunar eclipse on May 12, 1492. It contains partial eclipses from August 16, 1636 through March 24, 1997; total eclipses from April 4, 2015 through August 2, 2213; and a second set of partial eclipses from August 13, 2231 through November 30, 2411. The series ends at member 71 as a penumbral eclipse on June 26, 2754.

The longest duration of totality will be produced by member 36 at 106 minutes, 6 seconds on June 9, 2123. All eclipses in this series occur at the Moon’s ascending node of orbit.

Greatest	First			
The greatest eclipse of the series will occur on 2123 Jun 09, lasting 106 minutes, 6 seconds.	Penumbral	Partial	Total	Central
The greatest eclipse of the series will occur on 2123 Jun 09, lasting 106 minutes, 6 seconds.	1492 May 12	1636 Aug 16	2015 Apr 04	2069 May 06
The greatest eclipse of the series will occur on 2123 Jun 09, lasting 106 minutes, 6 seconds.	Last			
The greatest eclipse of the series will occur on 2123 Jun 09, lasting 106 minutes, 6 seconds.	Central	Total	Partial	Penumbral
The greatest eclipse of the series will occur on 2123 Jun 09, lasting 106 minutes, 6 seconds.	2177 Jul 11	2213 Aug 02	2411 Nov 30	2754 Jun 26

Eclipses are tabulated in three columns; every third eclipse in the same column is one exeligmos apart, so they all cast shadows over approximately the same parts of the Earth.

Series members 19–40 occur between 1801 and 2200:
19	20	21
1816 Dec 04	1834 Dec 16	1852 Dec 26
22	23	24
1871 Jan 06	1889 Jan 17	1907 Jan 29
25	26	27
1925 Feb 08	1943 Feb 20	1961 Mar 02
28	29	30
1979 Mar 13	1997 Mar 24	2015 Apr 04
31	32	33
2033 Apr 14	2051 Apr 26	2069 May 06
34	35	36
2087 May 17	2105 May 28	2123 Jun 09
37	38	39
2141 Jun 19	2159 Jun 30	2177 Jul 11
40
2195 Jul 22

=== Tritos series ===
This eclipse is a part of a tritos cycle, repeating at alternating nodes every 135 synodic months (≈ 3986.63 days, or 11 years minus 1 month). Their appearance and longitude are irregular due to a lack of synchronization with the anomalistic month (period of perigee), but groupings of 3 tritos cycles (≈ 33 years minus 3 months) come close (≈ 434.044 anomalistic months), so eclipses are similar in these groupings.

Series members between 1801 and 2200
1806 Nov 26 (Saros 103)		1828 Sep 23 (Saros 105)	1839 Aug 24 (Saros 106)	1850 Jul 24 (Saros 107)
1861 Jun 22 (Saros 108)	1872 May 22 (Saros 109)	1883 Apr 22 (Saros 110)	1894 Mar 21 (Saros 111)	1905 Feb 19 (Saros 112)
1916 Jan 20 (Saros 113)	1926 Dec 19 (Saros 114)	1937 Nov 18 (Saros 115)	1948 Oct 18 (Saros 116)	1959 Sep 17 (Saros 117)
1970 Aug 17 (Saros 118)	1981 Jul 17 (Saros 119)	1992 Jun 15 (Saros 120)	2003 May 16 (Saros 121)	2014 Apr 15 (Saros 122)
2025 Mar 14 (Saros 123)	2036 Feb 11 (Saros 124)	2047 Jan 12 (Saros 125)	2057 Dec 11 (Saros 126)	2068 Nov 09 (Saros 127)
2079 Oct 10 (Saros 128)	2090 Sep 08 (Saros 129)	2101 Aug 09 (Saros 130)	2112 Jul 09 (Saros 131)	2123 Jun 09 (Saros 132)
2134 May 08 (Saros 133)	2145 Apr 07 (Saros 134)	2156 Mar 07 (Saros 135)	2167 Feb 04 (Saros 136)	2178 Jan 04 (Saros 137)
2188 Dec 04 (Saros 138)	2199 Nov 02 (Saros 139)			

=== Inex series ===
This eclipse is a part of the long period inex cycle, repeating at alternating nodes, every 358 synodic months (≈ 10,571.95 days, or 29 years minus 20 days). Their appearance and longitude are irregular due to a lack of synchronization with the anomalistic month (period of perigee). However, groupings of 3 inex cycles (≈ 87 years minus 2 months) comes close (≈ 1,151.02 anomalistic months), so eclipses are similar in these groupings.

Series members between 1801 and 2200
1805 Jan 15 (Saros 121)	1833 Dec 26 (Saros 122)	1862 Dec 06 (Saros 123)
1891 Nov 16 (Saros 124)	1920 Oct 27 (Saros 125)	1949 Oct 07 (Saros 126)
1978 Sep 16 (Saros 127)	2007 Aug 28 (Saros 128)	2036 Aug 07 (Saros 129)
2065 Jul 17 (Saros 130)	2094 Jun 28 (Saros 131)	2123 Jun 09 (Saros 132)
2152 May 18 (Saros 133)	2181 Apr 29 (Saros 134)	

=== Half-Saros cycle ===
A lunar eclipse will be preceded and followed by solar eclipses by 9 years and 5.5 days (a half saros). This lunar eclipse is related to two total solar eclipses of Solar Saros 139.

June 3, 2114	June 13, 2132
