= June 2076 lunar eclipse =

Central lunar eclipse

- Total eclipse
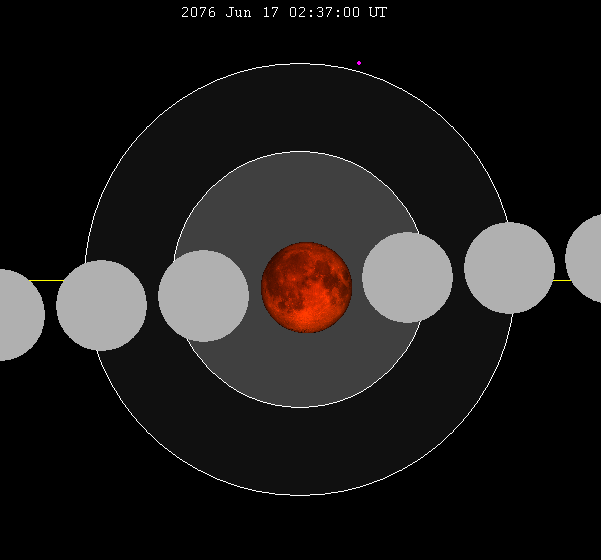
- The Moon's hourly motion shown right to left
- Date: June 17, 2076
- Gamma: −0.0452
- Magnitude: 1.7959
- Saros cycle: 131 (37 of 72)
- Totality: 100 minutes, 10 seconds
- Partiality: 215 minutes, 5 seconds
- Penumbral: 325 minutes, 21 seconds
Contacts (UTC)
- P1: 23:54:35
- U1: 0:49:46
- U2: 1:47:13
- Greatest: 2:37:18
- U3: 3:27:23
- U4: 4:24:51
- P4: 5:19:56

A total lunar eclipse will occur at the Moon’s descending node of orbit on Wednesday, June 17, 2076, with an umbral magnitude of 1.7959. It will be a central lunar eclipse, in which part of the Moon will pass through the center of the Earth's shadow. A lunar eclipse occurs when the Moon moves into the Earth's shadow, causing the Moon to be darkened. A total lunar eclipse occurs when the Moon's near side entirely passes into the Earth's umbral shadow. Unlike a solar eclipse, which can only be viewed from a relatively small area of the world, a lunar eclipse may be viewed from anywhere on the night side of Earth. A total lunar eclipse can last up to nearly two hours, while a total solar eclipse lasts only a few minutes at any given place, because the Moon's shadow is smaller. Occurring about 1.9 days before perigee (on June 18, 2076, at 20:40 UTC), the Moon's apparent diameter will be larger.

While the visual effect of a total eclipse is variable, the Moon may be stained a deep orange or red color at maximum eclipse. With a gamma value of only −0.0452 and an umbral eclipse magnitude of 1.7959, this is the second greatest eclipse in Saros series 131 as well as the largest and darkest lunar eclipse between June 26, 2029 and June 28, 2094. Overall, it will be the third largest and darkest lunar eclipse of the 21st century. While it will have similar values to the lunar eclipse of July 16, 2000, totality will not last over 106 minutes due to the moon's relatively large apparent size as seen from Earth and greater speed in its elliptical orbit.

NGC 6401 will be occulted by the Moon during the eclipse over Eastern North America, Cuba, the Atlantic Ocean, Southeast Europe and the northern half of Africa.

== Visibility ==
The eclipse will be completely visible over South America, west Africa, and Antarctica, seen rising over North America and the eastern Pacific Ocean and setting over Europe, west and south Asia, and central and east Africa.

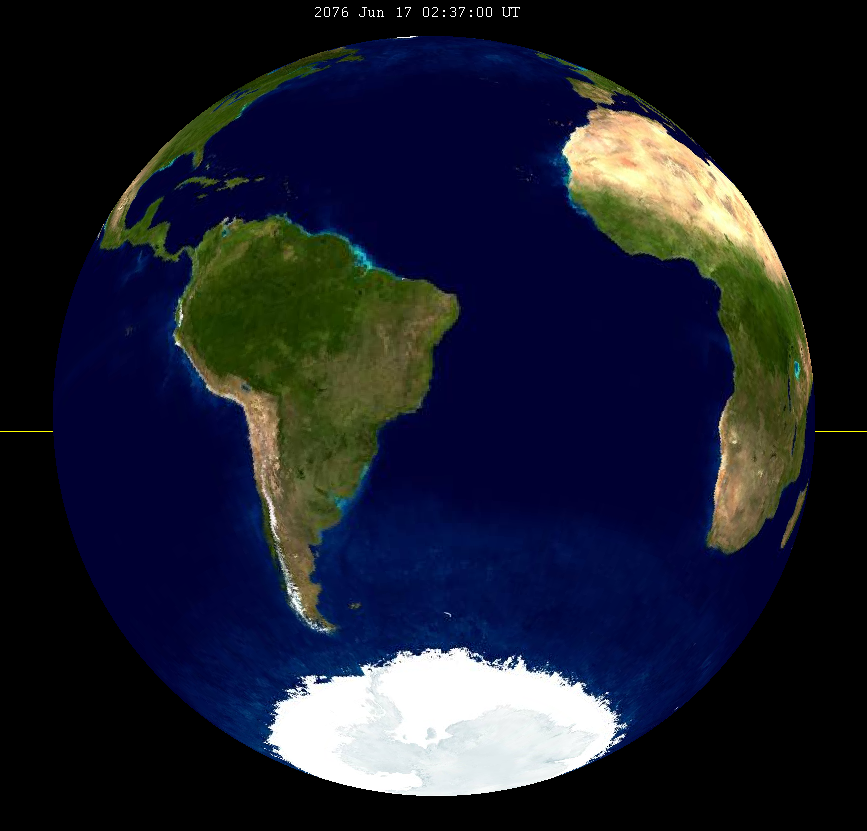
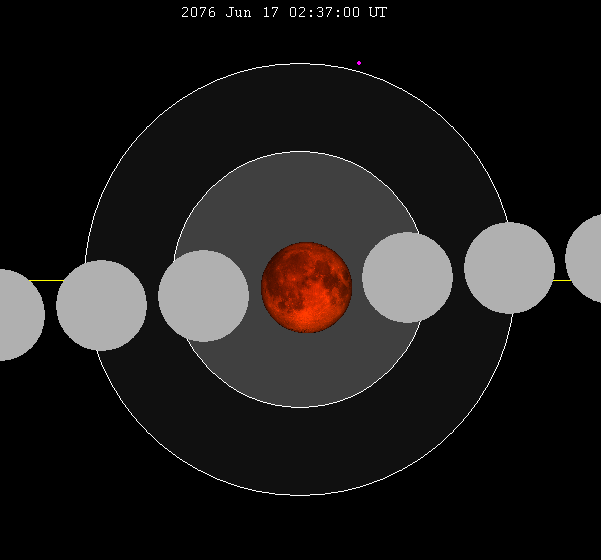

== Eclipse details ==
Shown below is a table displaying details about this particular solar eclipse. It describes various parameters pertaining to this eclipse.

June 17, 2076 Lunar Eclipse Parameters
Parameter	Value
Penumbral Magnitude	2.75698
Umbral Magnitude	1.79585
Gamma	−0.04518
Sun Right Ascension	05h46m08.2s
Sun Declination	+23°23'27.6"
Sun Semi-Diameter	15'44.6"
Sun Equatorial Horizontal Parallax	08.7"
Moon Right Ascension	17h46m06.8s
Moon Declination	-23°26'09.4"
Moon Semi-Diameter	16'22.8"
Moon Equatorial Horizontal Parallax	1°00'07.0"
ΔT	104.8 s

== Eclipse season ==
This eclipse is part of an eclipse season, a period, roughly every six months, when eclipses occur. Only two (or occasionally three) eclipse seasons occur each year, and each season lasts about 35 days and repeats just short of six months (173 days) later; thus two full eclipse seasons always occur each year. Either two or three eclipses happen each eclipse season. In the sequence below, each eclipse is separated by a fortnight. The first and last eclipse in this sequence is separated by one synodic month.

Eclipse season of June–July 2076
June 1 Ascending node (new moon)	June 17 Descending node (full moon)	July 1 Ascending node (new moon)
Partial solar eclipse Solar Saros 119	Total lunar eclipse Lunar Saros 131	Partial solar eclipse Solar Saros 157

== Related eclipses ==
=== Eclipses in 2076 ===
- A total solar eclipse on January 6.
- A partial solar eclipse on June 1.
- A total lunar eclipse on June 17.
- A partial solar eclipse on July 1.
- A partial solar eclipse on November 26.
- A total lunar eclipse on December 10.

=== Metonic ===
- Preceded by: Lunar eclipse of August 28, 2072
- Followed by: Lunar eclipse of April 4, 2080

=== Tzolkinex ===
- Preceded by: Lunar eclipse of May 6, 2069
- Followed by: Lunar eclipse of July 29, 2083

=== Half-Saros ===
- Preceded by: Solar eclipse of June 11, 2067
- Followed by: Solar eclipse of June 22, 2085

=== Tritos ===
- Preceded by: Lunar eclipse of July 17, 2065
- Followed by: Lunar eclipse of May 17, 2087

=== Lunar Saros 131 ===
- Preceded by: Lunar eclipse of June 6, 2058
- Followed by: Lunar eclipse of June 28, 2094

=== Inex ===
- Preceded by: Lunar eclipse of July 7, 2047
- Followed by: Lunar eclipse of May 28, 2105

=== Triad ===
- Preceded by: Lunar eclipse of August 16, 1989
- Followed by: Lunar eclipse of April 19, 2163

=== Lunar eclipses of 2074–2078 ===
This eclipse is a member of a semester series. An eclipse in a semester series of lunar eclipses repeats approximately every 177 days and 4 hours (a semester) at alternating nodes of the Moon's orbit.

The penumbral lunar eclipses on February 11, 2074 and August 7, 2074 occur in the previous lunar year eclipse set, and the penumbral lunar eclipses on April 27, 2078 and October 21, 2078 occur in the next lunar year eclipse set.

Lunar eclipse series sets from 2074 to 2078
Descending node				Ascending node			
Saros	Date Viewing	Type Chart	Gamma	Saros	Date Viewing	Type Chart	Gamma
111	2074 Jul 08	Penumbral	1.4456	116	2075 Jan 02	Penumbral	−1.1642
121	2075 Jun 28	Partial	0.6897	126	2075 Dec 22	Partial	−0.4945
131	2076 Jun 17	Total	−0.0452	136	2076 Dec 10	Total	0.2102
141	2077 Jun 06	Partial	−0.8387	146	2077 Nov 29	Partial	0.8854
				156	2078 Nov 19	Penumbral	1.5147

=== Saros 131 ===
This eclipse is a part of Saros series 131, repeating every 18 years, 11 days, and containing 72 events. The series started with a penumbral lunar eclipse on May 10, 1427. It contains partial eclipses from July 25, 1553 through March 22, 1932; total eclipses from April 2, 1950 through September 3, 2202; and a second set of partial eclipses from September 13, 2220 through April 9, 2563. The series ends at member 72 as a penumbral eclipse on July 7, 2707.

The longest duration of totality will be produced by member 38 at 100 minutes, 36 seconds on June 28, 2094. All eclipses in this series occur at the Moon’s descending node of orbit.

Greatest	First			
The greatest eclipse of the series will occur on 2094 Jun 28, lasting 100 minutes, 36 seconds.	Penumbral	Partial	Total	Central
The greatest eclipse of the series will occur on 2094 Jun 28, lasting 100 minutes, 36 seconds.	1427 May 10	1553 Jul 25	1950 Apr 02	2022 May 16
The greatest eclipse of the series will occur on 2094 Jun 28, lasting 100 minutes, 36 seconds.	Last			
The greatest eclipse of the series will occur on 2094 Jun 28, lasting 100 minutes, 36 seconds.	Central	Total	Partial	Penumbral
The greatest eclipse of the series will occur on 2094 Jun 28, lasting 100 minutes, 36 seconds.	2148 Jul 31	2202 Sep 03	2563 Apr 09	2707 Jul 07

Eclipses are tabulated in three columns; every third eclipse in the same column is one exeligmos apart, so they all cast shadows over approximately the same parts of the Earth.

Series members 22–43 occur between 1801 and 2200:
22	23	24
1806 Jan 05	1824 Jan 16	1842 Jan 26
25	26	27
1860 Feb 07	1878 Feb 17	1896 Feb 28
28	29	30
1914 Mar 12	1932 Mar 22	1950 Apr 02
31	32	33
1968 Apr 13	1986 Apr 24	2004 May 04
34	35	36
2022 May 16	2040 May 26	2058 Jun 06
37	38	39
2076 Jun 17	2094 Jun 28	2112 Jul 09
40	41	42
2130 Jul 21	2148 Jul 31	2166 Aug 11
43
2184 Aug 21

=== Tritos series ===
This eclipse is a part of a tritos cycle, repeating at alternating nodes every 135 synodic months (≈ 3986.63 days, or 11 years minus 1 month). Their appearance and longitude are irregular due to a lack of synchronization with the anomalistic month (period of perigee), but groupings of 3 tritos cycles (≈ 33 years minus 3 months) come close (≈ 434.044 anomalistic months), so eclipses are similar in these groupings.

Series members between 1801 and 2200
1803 Aug 03 (Saros 106)	1814 Jul 02 (Saros 107)	1825 Jun 01 (Saros 108)	1836 May 01 (Saros 109)	1847 Mar 31 (Saros 110)
1858 Feb 27 (Saros 111)	1869 Jan 28 (Saros 112)	1879 Dec 28 (Saros 113)	1890 Nov 26 (Saros 114)	1901 Oct 27 (Saros 115)
1912 Sep 26 (Saros 116)	1923 Aug 26 (Saros 117)	1934 Jul 26 (Saros 118)	1945 Jun 25 (Saros 119)	1956 May 24 (Saros 120)
1967 Apr 24 (Saros 121)	1978 Mar 24 (Saros 122)	1989 Feb 20 (Saros 123)	2000 Jan 21 (Saros 124)	2010 Dec 21 (Saros 125)
2021 Nov 19 (Saros 126)	2032 Oct 18 (Saros 127)	2043 Sep 19 (Saros 128)	2054 Aug 18 (Saros 129)	2065 Jul 17 (Saros 130)
2076 Jun 17 (Saros 131)	2087 May 17 (Saros 132)	2098 Apr 15 (Saros 133)	2109 Mar 17 (Saros 134)	2120 Feb 14 (Saros 135)
2131 Jan 13 (Saros 136)	2141 Dec 13 (Saros 137)	2152 Nov 12 (Saros 138)	2163 Oct 12 (Saros 139)	2174 Sep 11 (Saros 140)
2185 Aug 11 (Saros 141)	2196 Jul 10 (Saros 142)			

=== Inex series ===
This eclipse is a part of the long period inex cycle, repeating at alternating nodes, every 358 synodic months (≈ 10,571.95 days, or 29 years minus 20 days). Their appearance and longitude are irregular due to a lack of synchronization with the anomalistic month (period of perigee). However, groupings of 3 inex cycles (≈ 87 years minus 2 months) comes close (≈ 1,151.02 anomalistic months), so eclipses are similar in these groupings.

Series members between 1801 and 2200
1815 Dec 16 (Saros 122)	1844 Nov 24 (Saros 123)	1873 Nov 04 (Saros 124)
1902 Oct 17 (Saros 125)	1931 Sep 26 (Saros 126)	1960 Sep 05 (Saros 127)
1989 Aug 17 (Saros 128)	2018 Jul 27 (Saros 129)	2047 Jul 07 (Saros 130)
2076 Jun 17 (Saros 131)	2105 May 28 (Saros 132)	2134 May 08 (Saros 133)
2163 Apr 19 (Saros 134)	2192 Mar 28 (Saros 135)	

=== Half-Saros cycle ===
A lunar eclipse will be preceded and followed by solar eclipses by 9 years and 5.5 days (a half saros). This lunar eclipse is related to two annular solar eclipses of Solar Saros 138.

June 11, 2067	June 22, 2085

== See also ==
- List of lunar eclipses and List of 21st-century lunar eclipses
