= March 1961 lunar eclipse =

Partial lunar eclipse March 2, 1961

- Partial eclipse
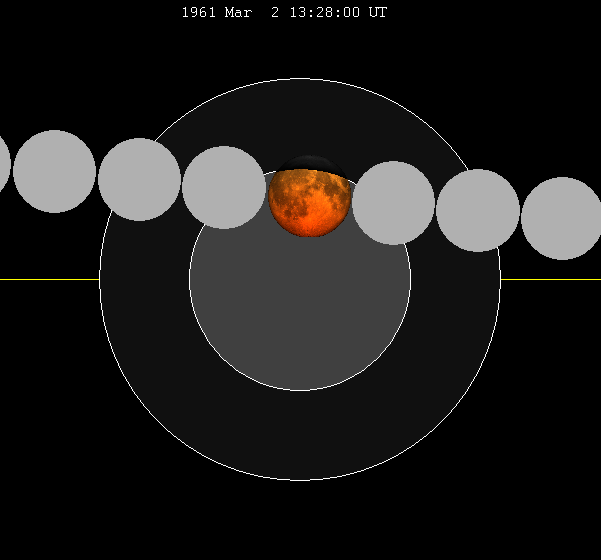
- The Moon's hourly motion shown right to left
- Date: March 2, 1961
- Gamma: 0.5541
- Magnitude: 0.8006
- Saros cycle: 132 (27 of 71)
- Partiality: 192 minutes, 51 seconds
- Penumbral: 347 minutes, 38 seconds
Contacts (UTC)
- P1: 10:34:15
- U1: 11:51:42
- Greatest: 13:28:06
- U4: 15:04:33
- P4: 16:21:53

A partial lunar eclipse occurred at the Moon’s ascending node of orbit on Thursday, March 2, 1961, with an umbral magnitude of 0.8006. A lunar eclipse occurs when the Moon moves into the Earth's shadow, causing the Moon to be darkened. A partial lunar eclipse occurs when one part of the Moon is in the Earth's umbra, while the other part is in the Earth's penumbra. Unlike a solar eclipse, which can only be viewed from a relatively small area of the world, a lunar eclipse may be viewed from anywhere on the night side of Earth. Occurring about 3.7 days after apogee (on February 26, 1961, at 21:10 UTC), the Moon's apparent diameter was smaller.

== Visibility ==
The eclipse was completely visible over east and northeast Asia, Australia, and northwestern North America, seen rising over east Africa, eastern Europe and much of Asia and setting over much of North America and northwestern South America.

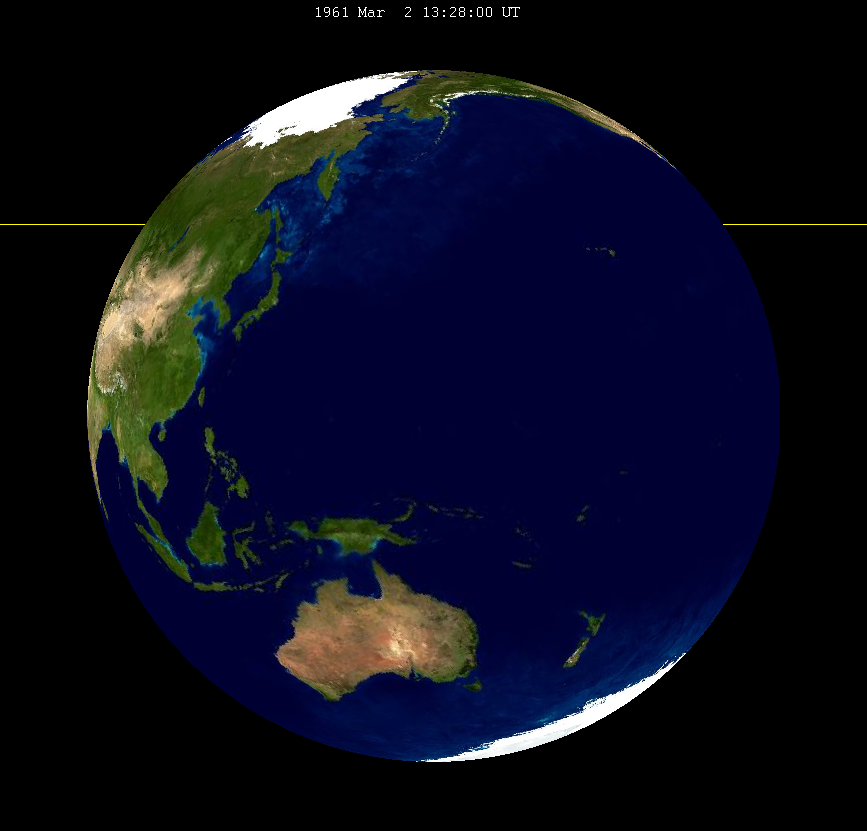
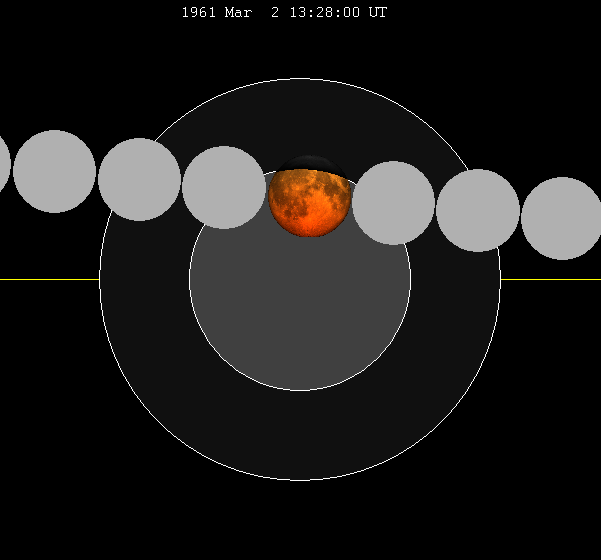

== Eclipse details ==
Shown below is a table displaying details about this particular solar eclipse. It describes various parameters pertaining to this eclipse.

March 2, 1961 Lunar Eclipse Parameters
| Parameter | Value |
|---|---|
| Penumbral Magnitude | 1.88284 |
| Umbral Magnitude | 0.80062 |
| Gamma | 0.55406 |
| Sun Right Ascension | 22h52m38.0s |
| Sun Declination | -07°09'38.0" |
| Sun Semi-Diameter | 16'08.1" |
| Sun Equatorial Horizontal Parallax | 08.9" |
| Moon Right Ascension | 10h53m13.0s |
| Moon Declination | +07°38'40.5" |
| Moon Semi-Diameter | 14'54.5" |
| Moon Equatorial Horizontal Parallax | 0°54'43.0" |
| ΔT | 33.6 s |

== Eclipse season ==
This eclipse is part of an eclipse season, a period, roughly every six months, when eclipses occur. Only two (or occasionally three) eclipse seasons occur each year, and each season lasts about 35 days and repeats just short of six months (173 days) later; thus two full eclipse seasons always occur each year. Either two or three eclipses happen each eclipse season. In the sequence below, each eclipse is separated by a fortnight.

Eclipse season of February–March 1961
| February 15 Descending node (new moon) | March 2 Ascending node (full moon) |
|---|---|
| Total solar eclipse Solar Saros 120 | Partial lunar eclipse Lunar Saros 132 |

== Related eclipses ==
=== Eclipses in 1961 ===
- A total solar eclipse on February 15.
- A partial lunar eclipse on March 2.
- An annular solar eclipse on August 11.
- A partial lunar eclipse on August 26.

=== Metonic ===
- Preceded by: Lunar eclipse of May 13, 1957
- Followed by: Lunar eclipse of December 19, 1964

=== Tzolkinex ===
- Preceded by: Lunar eclipse of January 19, 1954
- Followed by: Lunar eclipse of April 13, 1968

=== Half-Saros ===
- Preceded by: Solar eclipse of February 25, 1952
- Followed by: Solar eclipse of March 7, 1970

=== Tritos ===
- Preceded by: Lunar eclipse of April 2, 1950
- Followed by: Lunar eclipse of January 30, 1972

=== Lunar Saros 132 ===
- Preceded by: Lunar eclipse of February 20, 1943
- Followed by: Lunar eclipse of March 13, 1979

=== Inex ===
- Preceded by: Lunar eclipse of March 22, 1932
- Followed by: Lunar eclipse of February 9, 1990

=== Triad ===
- Preceded by: Lunar eclipse of May 1, 1874
- Followed by: Lunar eclipse of January 1, 2048

=== Lunar eclipses of 1958–1962 ===
This eclipse is a member of a semester series. An eclipse in a semester series of lunar eclipses repeats approximately every 177 days and 4 hours (a semester) at alternating nodes of the Moon's orbit.

The lunar eclipses on May 3, 1958 (partial) and October 28, 1958 (penumbral) occur in the previous lunar year eclipse set, and the penumbral lunar eclipse on July 17, 1962 occurs in the next lunar year eclipse set.

Lunar eclipse series sets from 1958 to 1962
| Ascending node | | | | Descending node | | | |
| Saros | Date Viewing | Type Chart | Gamma | Saros | Date Viewing | Type Chart | Gamma |
| 102 | 1958 Apr 04 | Penumbral | −1.5381 | | | | |
| 112 | 1959 Mar 24 | Partial | −0.8757 | 117 | 1959 Sep 17 | Penumbral | 1.0296 |
| 122 | 1960 Mar 13 | Total | −0.1799 | 127 | 1960 Sep 05 | Total | 0.2422 |
| 132 | 1961 Mar 02 | Partial | 0.5541 | 137 | 1961 Aug 26 | Partial | −0.4895 |
| 142 | 1962 Feb 19 | Penumbral | 1.2512 | 147 | 1962 Aug 15 | Penumbral | −1.2210 |

=== Saros 132 ===
This eclipse is a part of Saros series 132, repeating every 18 years, 11 days, and containing 71 events. The series started with a penumbral lunar eclipse on May 12, 1492. It contains partial eclipses from August 16, 1636 through March 24, 1997; total eclipses from April 4, 2015 through August 2, 2213; and a second set of partial eclipses from August 13, 2231 through November 30, 2411. The series ends at member 71 as a penumbral eclipse on June 26, 2754.

The longest duration of totality will be produced by member 36 at 106 minutes, 6 seconds on June 9, 2123. All eclipses in this series occur at the Moon’s ascending node of orbit.

| Greatest | First | | | |
|---|---|---|---|---|
| The greatest eclipse of the series will occur on 2123 Jun 09, lasting 106 minutes, 6 seconds. | Penumbral | Partial | Total | Central |
| The greatest eclipse of the series will occur on 2123 Jun 09, lasting 106 minutes, 6 seconds. | 1492 May 12 | 1636 Aug 16 | 2015 Apr 04 | 2069 May 06 |
| The greatest eclipse of the series will occur on 2123 Jun 09, lasting 106 minutes, 6 seconds. | Last | | | |
| The greatest eclipse of the series will occur on 2123 Jun 09, lasting 106 minutes, 6 seconds. | Central | Total | Partial | Penumbral |
| The greatest eclipse of the series will occur on 2123 Jun 09, lasting 106 minutes, 6 seconds. | 2177 Jul 11 | 2213 Aug 02 | 2411 Nov 30 | 2754 Jun 26 |

Eclipses are tabulated in three columns; every third eclipse in the same column is one exeligmos apart, so they all cast shadows over approximately the same parts of the Earth.

Series members 19–40 occur between 1801 and 2200:
| 19 | 20 | 21 |
|---|---|---|
| 1816 Dec 04 | 1834 Dec 16 | 1852 Dec 26 |
| 22 | 23 | 24 |
| 1871 Jan 06 | 1889 Jan 17 | 1907 Jan 29 |
| 25 | 26 | 27 |
| 1925 Feb 08 | 1943 Feb 20 | 1961 Mar 02 |
| 28 | 29 | 30 |
| 1979 Mar 13 | 1997 Mar 24 | 2015 Apr 04 |
| 31 | 32 | 33 |
| 2033 Apr 14 | 2051 Apr 26 | 2069 May 06 |
| 34 | 35 | 36 |
| 2087 May 17 | 2105 May 28 | 2123 Jun 09 |
| 37 | 38 | 39 |
| 2141 Jun 19 | 2159 Jun 30 | 2177 Jul 11 |
40
2195 Jul 22

=== Tritos series ===
This eclipse is a part of a tritos cycle, repeating at alternating nodes every 135 synodic months (≈ 3986.63 days, or 11 years minus 1 month). Their appearance and longitude are irregular due to a lack of synchronization with the anomalistic month (period of perigee), but groupings of 3 tritos cycles (≈ 33 years minus 3 months) come close (≈ 434.044 anomalistic months), so eclipses are similar in these groupings.

Series members between 1801 and 2200
| 1808 May 10 (Saros 118) | 1819 Apr 10 (Saros 119) | 1830 Mar 09 (Saros 120) | 1841 Feb 06 (Saros 121) | 1852 Jan 07 (Saros 122) |
| 1862 Dec 06 (Saros 123) | 1873 Nov 04 (Saros 124) | 1884 Oct 04 (Saros 125) | 1895 Sep 04 (Saros 126) | 1906 Aug 04 (Saros 127) |
| 1917 Jul 04 (Saros 128) | 1928 Jun 03 (Saros 129) | 1939 May 03 (Saros 130) | 1950 Apr 02 (Saros 131) | 1961 Mar 02 (Saros 132) |
| 1972 Jan 30 (Saros 133) | 1982 Dec 30 (Saros 134) | 1993 Nov 29 (Saros 135) | 2004 Oct 28 (Saros 136) | 2015 Sep 28 (Saros 137) |
| 2026 Aug 28 (Saros 138) | 2037 Jul 27 (Saros 139) | 2048 Jun 26 (Saros 140) | 2059 May 27 (Saros 141) | 2070 Apr 25 (Saros 142) |
| 2081 Mar 25 (Saros 143) | 2092 Feb 23 (Saros 144) | 2103 Jan 23 (Saros 145) | 2113 Dec 22 (Saros 146) | 2124 Nov 21 (Saros 147) |
| 2135 Oct 22 (Saros 148) | 2146 Sep 20 (Saros 149) | 2157 Aug 20 (Saros 150) | 2168 Jul 20 (Saros 151) | 2179 Jun 19 (Saros 152) |
2190 May 19 (Saros 153)

=== Inex series ===
This eclipse is a part of the long period inex cycle, repeating at alternating nodes, every 358 synodic months (≈ 10,571.95 days, or 29 years minus 20 days). Their appearance and longitude are irregular due to a lack of synchronization with the anomalistic month (period of perigee). However, groupings of 3 inex cycles (≈ 87 years minus 2 months) comes close (≈ 1,151.02 anomalistic months), so eclipses are similar in these groupings.

Series members between 1801 and 2200
| 1816 Jun 10 (Saros 127) | 1845 May 21 (Saros 128) | 1874 May 01 (Saros 129) |
| 1903 Apr 12 (Saros 130) | 1932 Mar 22 (Saros 131) | 1961 Mar 02 (Saros 132) |
| 1990 Feb 09 (Saros 133) | 2019 Jan 21 (Saros 134) | 2048 Jan 01 (Saros 135) |
| 2076 Dec 10 (Saros 136) | 2105 Nov 21 (Saros 137) | 2134 Nov 02 (Saros 138) |
| 2163 Oct 12 (Saros 139) | 2192 Sep 21 (Saros 140) | |

=== Half-Saros cycle ===
A lunar eclipse will be preceded and followed by solar eclipses by 9 years and 5.5 days (a half saros). This lunar eclipse is related to two total solar eclipses of Solar Saros 139.

| February 25, 1952 | March 7, 1970 |

== See also ==
- List of lunar eclipses
- List of 20th-century lunar eclipses
