= September 1913 lunar eclipse =

Central lunar eclipse in the 1910s

- Total eclipse
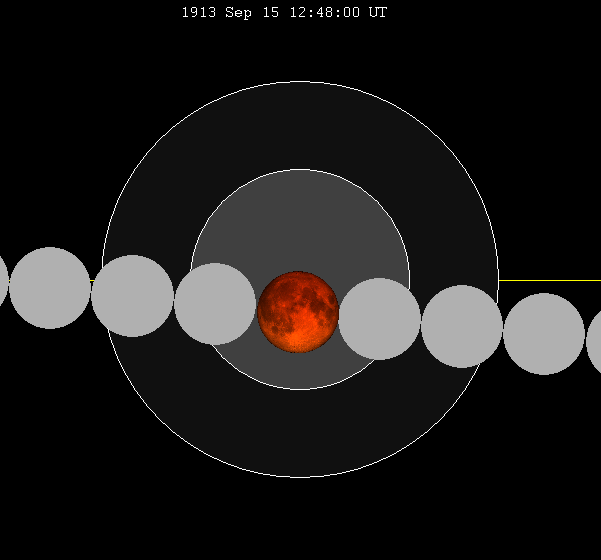
- The Moon's hourly motion shown right to left
- Date: September 15, 1913
- Gamma: −0.2109
- Magnitude: 1.4304
- Saros cycle: 126 (39 of 70)
- Totality: 93 minutes, 29 seconds
- Partiality: 230 minutes, 33 seconds
- Penumbral: 373 minutes, 1 second
Contacts (UTC)
- P1: 9:41:33
- U1: 10:52:47
- U2: 12:01:19
- Greatest: 12:48:04
- U3: 13:34:48
- U4: 14:43:20
- P4: 15:54:34

A total lunar eclipse occurred at the Moon’s ascending node of orbit on Monday, September 15, 1913, with an umbral magnitude of 1.4304. It was a central lunar eclipse, in which part of the Moon passed through the center of the Earth's shadow. A lunar eclipse occurs when the Moon moves into the Earth's shadow, causing the Moon to be darkened. A total lunar eclipse occurs when the Moon's near side entirely passes into the Earth's umbral shadow. Unlike a solar eclipse, which can only be viewed from a relatively small area of the world, a lunar eclipse may be viewed from anywhere on the night side of Earth. A total lunar eclipse can last up to nearly two hours, while a total solar eclipse lasts only a few minutes at any given place, because the Moon's shadow is smaller. Occurring only about 30 minutes after apogee (on September 15, 1913, at 12:20 UTC), the Moon's apparent diameter was smaller.

== Visibility ==
The eclipse was completely visible over northeast Asia and Australia, seen rising over much of Asia and east Africa and setting over North America and western South America.

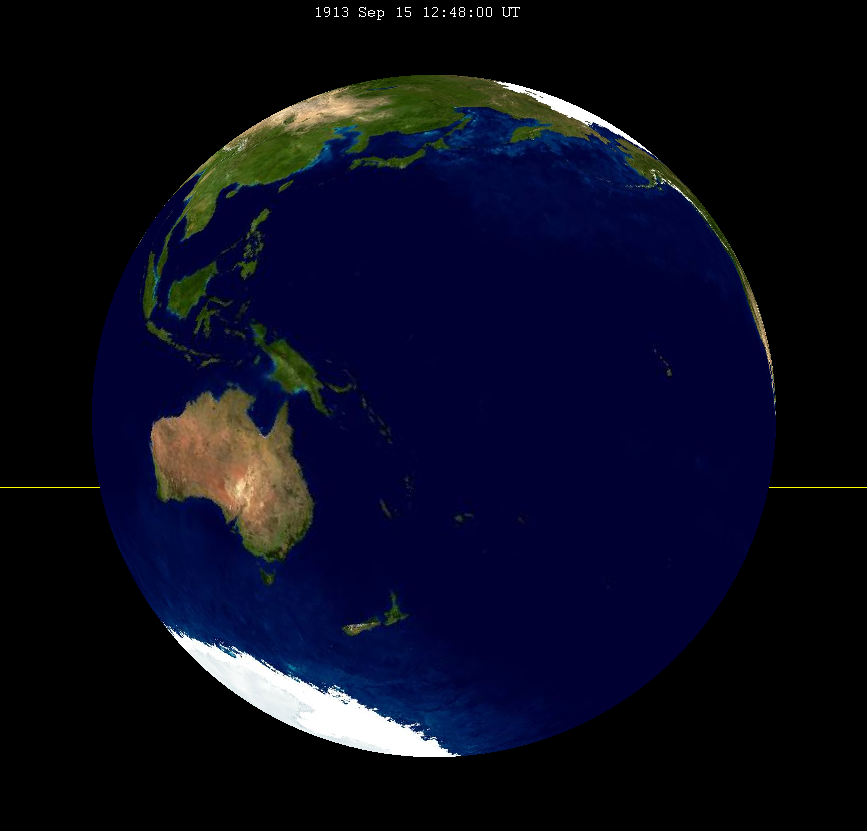
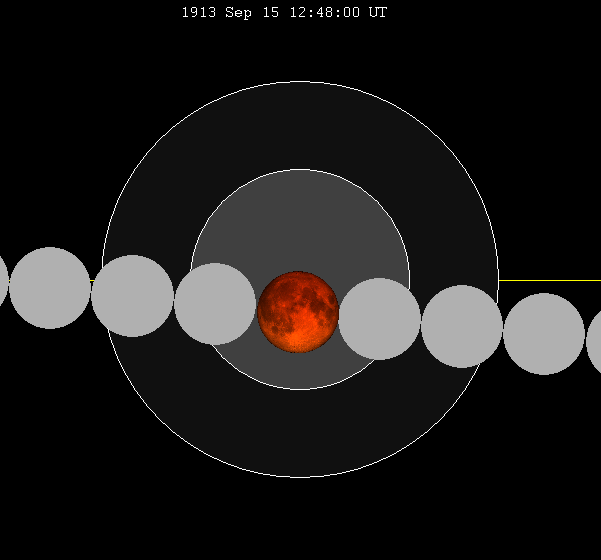

== Eclipse details ==
Shown below is a table displaying details about this particular solar eclipse. It describes various parameters pertaining to this eclipse.

September 15, 1913 Lunar Eclipse Parameters
Parameter	Value
Penumbral Magnitude	2.51225
Umbral Magnitude	1.43037
Gamma	−0.21093
Sun Right Ascension	11h30m49.6s
Sun Declination	+03°09'08.3"
Sun Semi-Diameter	15'54.6"
Sun Equatorial Horizontal Parallax	08.7"
Moon Right Ascension	23h31m11.8s
Moon Declination	-03°19'05.5"
Moon Semi-Diameter	14'42.3"
Moon Equatorial Horizontal Parallax	0°53'58.2"
ΔT	15.4 s

== Eclipse season ==
This eclipse is part of an eclipse season, a period, roughly every six months, when eclipses occur. Only two (or occasionally three) eclipse seasons occur each year, and each season lasts about 35 days and repeats just short of six months (173 days) later; thus two full eclipse seasons always occur each year. Either two or three eclipses happen each eclipse season. In the sequence below, each eclipse is separated by a fortnight. The first and last eclipse in this sequence is separated by one synodic month.

Eclipse season of August–September 1913
August 31 Descending node (new moon)	September 15 Ascending node (full moon)	September 30 Descending node (new moon)
Partial solar eclipse Solar Saros 114	Total lunar eclipse Lunar Saros 126	Partial solar eclipse Solar Saros 152

== Related eclipses ==
=== Eclipses in 1913 ===
- A total lunar eclipse on March 22.
- A partial solar eclipse on April 6.
- A partial solar eclipse on August 31.
- A total lunar eclipse on September 15.
- A partial solar eclipse on September 30.

=== Metonic ===
- Preceded by: Lunar eclipse of November 27, 1909
- Followed by: Lunar eclipse of July 4, 1917

=== Tzolkinex ===
- Preceded by: Lunar eclipse of August 4, 1906
- Followed by: Lunar eclipse of October 27, 1920

=== Half-Saros ===
- Preceded by: Solar eclipse of September 9, 1904
- Followed by: Solar eclipse of September 21, 1922

=== Tritos ===
- Preceded by: Lunar eclipse of October 17, 1902
- Followed by: Lunar eclipse of August 14, 1924

=== Lunar Saros 126 ===
- Preceded by: Lunar eclipse of September 4, 1895
- Followed by: Lunar eclipse of September 26, 1931

=== Inex ===
- Preceded by: Lunar eclipse of October 4, 1884
- Followed by: Lunar eclipse of August 26, 1942

=== Triad ===
- Preceded by: Lunar eclipse of November 14, 1826
- Followed by: Lunar eclipse of July 16, 2000

=== Lunar eclipses of 1912–1915 ===
This eclipse is a member of a semester series. An eclipse in a semester series of lunar eclipses repeats approximately every 177 days and 4 hours (a semester) at alternating nodes of the Moon's orbit.

The penumbral lunar eclipses on January 31, 1915 and July 26, 1915 occur in the next lunar year eclipse set.

Lunar eclipse series sets from 1912 to 1915
Descending node				Ascending node			
Saros	Date Viewing	Type Chart	Gamma	Saros	Date Viewing	Type Chart	Gamma
111	1912 Apr 01	Partial	0.9116	116	1912 Sep 26	Partial	−0.9320
121	1913 Mar 22	Total	0.1671	126	1913 Sep 15	Total	−0.2109
131	1914 Mar 12	Partial	−0.5254	136	1914 Sep 04	Partial	0.5301
141	1915 Mar 01	Penumbral	−1.2573	146	1915 Aug 24	Penumbral	1.2435

=== Saros 126 ===
This eclipse is a part of Saros series 126, repeating every 18 years, 11 days, and containing 70 events. The series started with a penumbral lunar eclipse on July 18, 1228. It contains partial eclipses from March 24, 1625 through June 9, 1751; total eclipses from June 19, 1769 through November 9, 2003; and a second set of partial eclipses from November 19, 2021 through June 5, 2346. The series ends at member 70 as a penumbral eclipse on August 19, 2472.

The longest duration of totality was produced by member 36 at 106 minutes, 27 seconds on August 13, 1859. All eclipses in this series occur at the Moon’s ascending node of orbit.

Greatest	First			
The greatest eclipse of the series occurred on 1859 Aug 13, lasting 106 minutes, 27 seconds.	Penumbral	Partial	Total	Central
The greatest eclipse of the series occurred on 1859 Aug 13, lasting 106 minutes, 27 seconds.	1228 Jul 18	1625 Mar 24	1769 Jun 19	1805 Jul 11
The greatest eclipse of the series occurred on 1859 Aug 13, lasting 106 minutes, 27 seconds.	Last			
The greatest eclipse of the series occurred on 1859 Aug 13, lasting 106 minutes, 27 seconds.	Central	Total	Partial	Penumbral
The greatest eclipse of the series occurred on 1859 Aug 13, lasting 106 minutes, 27 seconds.	1931 Sep 26	2003 Nov 09	2346 Jun 05	2472 Aug 19

Eclipses are tabulated in three columns; every third eclipse in the same column is one exeligmos apart, so they all cast shadows over approximately the same parts of the Earth.

Series members 33–54 occur between 1801 and 2200:
33	34	35
1805 Jul 11	1823 Jul 23	1841 Aug 02
36	37	38
1859 Aug 13	1877 Aug 23	1895 Sep 04
39	40	41
1913 Sep 15	1931 Sep 26	1949 Oct 07
42	43	44
1967 Oct 18	1985 Oct 28	2003 Nov 09
45	46	47
2021 Nov 19	2039 Nov 30	2057 Dec 11
48	49	50
2075 Dec 22	2094 Jan 01	2112 Jan 14
51	52	53
2130 Jan 24	2148 Feb 04	2166 Feb 15
54
2184 Feb 26

=== Tritos series ===
This eclipse is a part of a tritos cycle, repeating at alternating nodes every 135 synodic months (≈ 3986.63 days, or 11 years minus 1 month). Their appearance and longitude are irregular due to a lack of synchronization with the anomalistic month (period of perigee), but groupings of 3 tritos cycles (≈ 33 years minus 3 months) come close (≈ 434.044 anomalistic months), so eclipses are similar in these groupings.

Series members between 1801 and 2200
1804 Jul 22 (Saros 116)	1815 Jun 21 (Saros 117)	1826 May 21 (Saros 118)	1837 Apr 20 (Saros 119)	1848 Mar 19 (Saros 120)
1859 Feb 17 (Saros 121)	1870 Jan 17 (Saros 122)	1880 Dec 16 (Saros 123)	1891 Nov 16 (Saros 124)	1902 Oct 17 (Saros 125)
1913 Sep 15 (Saros 126)	1924 Aug 14 (Saros 127)	1935 Jul 16 (Saros 128)	1946 Jun 14 (Saros 129)	1957 May 13 (Saros 130)
1968 Apr 13 (Saros 131)	1979 Mar 13 (Saros 132)	1990 Feb 09 (Saros 133)	2001 Jan 09 (Saros 134)	2011 Dec 10 (Saros 135)
2022 Nov 08 (Saros 136)	2033 Oct 08 (Saros 137)	2044 Sep 07 (Saros 138)	2055 Aug 07 (Saros 139)	2066 Jul 07 (Saros 140)
2077 Jun 06 (Saros 141)	2088 May 05 (Saros 142)	2099 Apr 05 (Saros 143)	2110 Mar 06 (Saros 144)	2121 Feb 02 (Saros 145)
2132 Jan 02 (Saros 146)	2142 Dec 03 (Saros 147)	2153 Nov 01 (Saros 148)	2164 Sep 30 (Saros 149)	2175 Aug 31 (Saros 150)
2186 Jul 31 (Saros 151)	2197 Jun 29 (Saros 152)			

=== Inex series ===
This eclipse is a part of the long period inex cycle, repeating at alternating nodes, every 358 synodic months (≈ 10,571.95 days, or 29 years minus 20 days). Their appearance and longitude are irregular due to a lack of synchronization with the anomalistic month (period of perigee). However, groupings of 3 inex cycles (≈ 87 years minus 2 months) comes close (≈ 1,151.02 anomalistic months), so eclipses are similar in these groupings.

Series members between 1801 and 2200
1826 Nov 14 (Saros 123)	1855 Oct 25 (Saros 124)	1884 Oct 04 (Saros 125)
1913 Sep 15 (Saros 126)	1942 Aug 26 (Saros 127)	1971 Aug 06 (Saros 128)
2000 Jul 16 (Saros 129)	2029 Jun 26 (Saros 130)	2058 Jun 06 (Saros 131)
2087 May 17 (Saros 132)	2116 Apr 27 (Saros 133)	2145 Apr 07 (Saros 134)
2174 Mar 18 (Saros 135)

=== Half-Saros cycle ===
A lunar eclipse will be preceded and followed by solar eclipses by 9 years and 5.5 days (a half saros). This lunar eclipse is related to two total solar eclipses of Solar Saros 133.

September 9, 1904	September 21, 1922

== See also ==
- List of lunar eclipses
- List of 20th-century lunar eclipses
