= April 1950 lunar eclipse =

Total lunar eclipse April 2, 1950

- Total eclipse
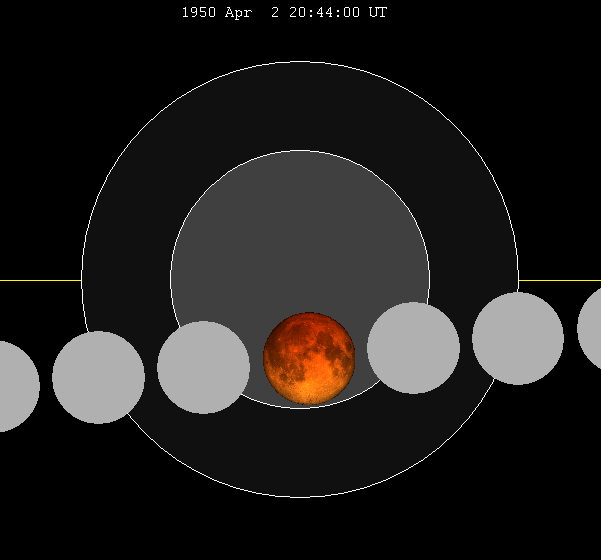
- The Moon's hourly motion shown right to left
- Date: April 2, 1950
- Gamma: −0.4599
- Magnitude: 1.0329
- Saros cycle: 131 (30 of 72)
- Totality: 26 minutes, 54 seconds
- Partiality: 189 minutes, 35 seconds
- Penumbral: 306 minutes, 32 seconds
Contacts (UTC)
- P1: 18:10:49
- U1: 19:09:19
- U2: 20:30:38
- Greatest: 20:44:05
- U3: 20:57:33
- U4: 22:18:54
- P4: 23:17:21

A total lunar eclipse occurred at the Moon’s descending node of orbit on Sunday, April 2, 1950, with an umbral magnitude of 1.0329. A lunar eclipse occurs when the Moon moves into the Earth's shadow, causing the Moon to be darkened. A total lunar eclipse occurs when the Moon's near side entirely passes into the Earth's umbral shadow. Unlike a solar eclipse, which can only be viewed from a relatively small area of the world, a lunar eclipse may be viewed from anywhere on the night side of Earth. A total lunar eclipse can last up to nearly two hours, while a total solar eclipse lasts only a few minutes at any given place, because the Moon's shadow is smaller. Occurring only about 23 hours before perigee (on April 3, 1950, at 20:00 UTC), the Moon's apparent diameter was larger.

This lunar eclipse was the third of a tetrad, with four total lunar eclipses in series, the others being on April 13, 1949; October 7, 1949; and September 26, 1950.

This was the first total lunar eclipse of Lunar Saros 131.

== Visibility ==
The eclipse was completely visible over much of Africa, Europe, and the western half of Asia, seen rising over South America and setting over east and northeast Asia and Australia.

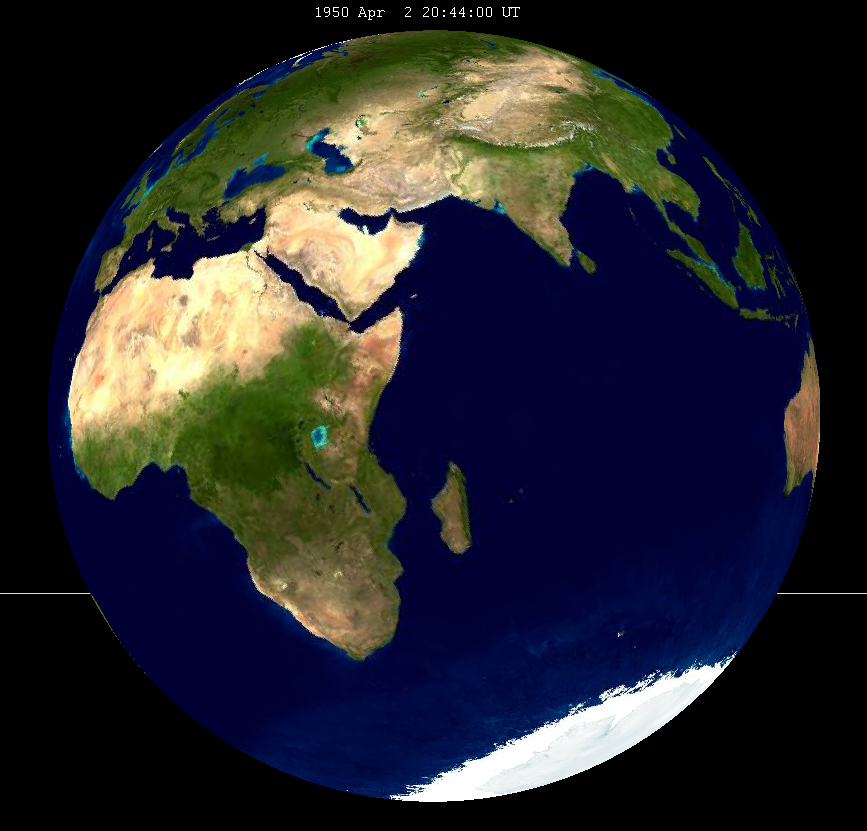
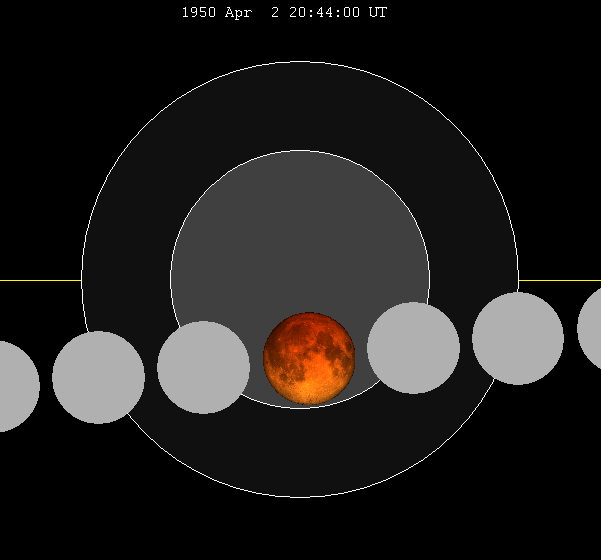

== Eclipse details ==
Shown below is a table displaying details about this particular solar eclipse. It describes various parameters pertaining to this eclipse.

April 2, 1950 Lunar Eclipse Parameters
Parameter	Value
Penumbral Magnitude	1.99513
Umbral Magnitude	1.03288
Gamma	−0.45987
Sun Right Ascension	00h46m07.6s
Sun Declination	+04°57'20.0"
Sun Semi-Diameter	15'59.8"
Sun Equatorial Horizontal Parallax	08.8"
Moon Right Ascension	12h45m13.6s
Moon Declination	-05°21'58.0"
Moon Semi-Diameter	16'37.5"
Moon Equatorial Horizontal Parallax	1°01'00.8"
ΔT	29.2 s

== Eclipse season ==
This eclipse is part of an eclipse season, a period, roughly every six months, when eclipses occur. Only two (or occasionally three) eclipse seasons occur each year, and each season lasts about 35 days and repeats just short of six months (173 days) later; thus two full eclipse seasons always occur each year. Either two or three eclipses happen each eclipse season. In the sequence below, each eclipse is separated by a fortnight.

Eclipse season of March–April 1950
March 18 Ascending node (new moon)	April 2 Descending node (full moon)
Annular solar eclipse Solar Saros 119	Total lunar eclipse Lunar Saros 131

== Related eclipses ==
=== Eclipses in 1950 ===
- A non-central annular solar eclipse on March 18.
- A total lunar eclipse on April 2.
- A total solar eclipse on September 12.
- A total lunar eclipse on September 26.

=== Metonic ===
- Preceded by: Lunar eclipse of June 14, 1946
- Followed by: Lunar eclipse of January 19, 1954

=== Tzolkinex ===
- Preceded by: Lunar eclipse of February 20, 1943
- Followed by: Lunar eclipse of May 13, 1957

=== Half-Saros ===
- Preceded by: Solar eclipse of March 27, 1941
- Followed by: Solar eclipse of April 8, 1959

=== Tritos ===
- Preceded by: Lunar eclipse of May 3, 1939
- Followed by: Lunar eclipse of March 2, 1961

=== Lunar Saros 131 ===
- Preceded by: Lunar eclipse of March 22, 1932
- Followed by: Lunar eclipse of April 13, 1968

=== Inex ===
- Preceded by: Lunar eclipse of April 22, 1921
- Followed by: Lunar eclipse of March 13, 1979

=== Triad ===
- Preceded by: Lunar eclipse of June 1, 1863
- Followed by: Lunar eclipse of January 31, 2037

=== Lunar eclipses of 1948–1951 ===
This eclipse is a member of a semester series. An eclipse in a semester series of lunar eclipses repeats approximately every 177 days and 4 hours (a semester) at alternating nodes of the Moon's orbit.

The penumbral lunar eclipses on February 21, 1951 and August 17, 1951 occur in the next lunar year eclipse set.

Lunar eclipse series sets from 1948 to 1951
Descending node				Ascending node			
Saros	Date Viewing	Type Chart	Gamma	Saros	Date Viewing	Type Chart	Gamma
111	1948 Apr 23	Partial	1.0017	116	1948 Oct 18	Penumbral	−1.0245
121	1949 Apr 13	Total	0.2474	126	1949 Oct 07	Total	−0.3219
131	1950 Apr 02	Total	−0.4599	136	1950 Sep 26	Total	0.4101
141	1951 Mar 23	Penumbral	−1.2099	146	1951 Sep 15	Penumbral	1.1187

=== Saros 131 ===
This eclipse is a part of Saros series 131, repeating every 18 years, 11 days, and containing 72 events. The series started with a penumbral lunar eclipse on May 10, 1427. It contains partial eclipses from July 25, 1553 through March 22, 1932; total eclipses from April 2, 1950 through September 3, 2202; and a second set of partial eclipses from September 13, 2220 through April 9, 2563. The series ends at member 72 as a penumbral eclipse on July 7, 2707.

The longest duration of totality will be produced by member 38 at 100 minutes, 36 seconds on June 28, 2094. All eclipses in this series occur at the Moon’s descending node of orbit.

Greatest	First			
The greatest eclipse of the series will occur on 2094 Jun 28, lasting 100 minutes, 36 seconds.	Penumbral	Partial	Total	Central
The greatest eclipse of the series will occur on 2094 Jun 28, lasting 100 minutes, 36 seconds.	1427 May 10	1553 Jul 25	1950 Apr 02	2022 May 16
The greatest eclipse of the series will occur on 2094 Jun 28, lasting 100 minutes, 36 seconds.	Last			
The greatest eclipse of the series will occur on 2094 Jun 28, lasting 100 minutes, 36 seconds.	Central	Total	Partial	Penumbral
The greatest eclipse of the series will occur on 2094 Jun 28, lasting 100 minutes, 36 seconds.	2148 Jul 31	2202 Sep 03	2563 Apr 09	2707 Jul 07

Eclipses are tabulated in three columns; every third eclipse in the same column is one exeligmos apart, so they all cast shadows over approximately the same parts of the Earth.

Series members 22–43 occur between 1801 and 2200:
22	23	24
1806 Jan 05	1824 Jan 16	1842 Jan 26
25	26	27
1860 Feb 07	1878 Feb 17	1896 Feb 28
28	29	30
1914 Mar 12	1932 Mar 22	1950 Apr 02
31	32	33
1968 Apr 13	1986 Apr 24	2004 May 04
34	35	36
2022 May 16	2040 May 26	2058 Jun 06
37	38	39
2076 Jun 17	2094 Jun 28	2112 Jul 09
40	41	42
2130 Jul 21	2148 Jul 31	2166 Aug 11
43
2184 Aug 21

=== Tritos series ===
This eclipse is a part of a tritos cycle, repeating at alternating nodes every 135 synodic months (≈ 3986.63 days, or 11 years minus 1 month). Their appearance and longitude are irregular due to a lack of synchronization with the anomalistic month (period of perigee), but groupings of 3 tritos cycles (≈ 33 years minus 3 months) come close (≈ 434.044 anomalistic months), so eclipses are similar in these groupings.

Series members between 1801 and 2200
1808 May 10 (Saros 118)	1819 Apr 10 (Saros 119)	1830 Mar 09 (Saros 120)	1841 Feb 06 (Saros 121)	1852 Jan 07 (Saros 122)
1862 Dec 06 (Saros 123)	1873 Nov 04 (Saros 124)	1884 Oct 04 (Saros 125)	1895 Sep 04 (Saros 126)	1906 Aug 04 (Saros 127)
1917 Jul 04 (Saros 128)	1928 Jun 03 (Saros 129)	1939 May 03 (Saros 130)	1950 Apr 02 (Saros 131)	1961 Mar 02 (Saros 132)
1972 Jan 30 (Saros 133)	1982 Dec 30 (Saros 134)	1993 Nov 29 (Saros 135)	2004 Oct 28 (Saros 136)	2015 Sep 28 (Saros 137)
2026 Aug 28 (Saros 138)	2037 Jul 27 (Saros 139)	2048 Jun 26 (Saros 140)	2059 May 27 (Saros 141)	2070 Apr 25 (Saros 142)
2081 Mar 25 (Saros 143)	2092 Feb 23 (Saros 144)	2103 Jan 23 (Saros 145)	2113 Dec 22 (Saros 146)	2124 Nov 21 (Saros 147)
2135 Oct 22 (Saros 148)	2146 Sep 20 (Saros 149)	2157 Aug 20 (Saros 150)	2168 Jul 20 (Saros 151)	2179 Jun 19 (Saros 152)
2190 May 19 (Saros 153)

=== Inex series ===
This eclipse is a part of the long period inex cycle, repeating at alternating nodes, every 358 synodic months (≈ 10,571.95 days, or 29 years minus 20 days). Their appearance and longitude are irregular due to a lack of synchronization with the anomalistic month (period of perigee). However, groupings of 3 inex cycles (≈ 87 years minus 2 months) comes close (≈ 1,151.02 anomalistic months), so eclipses are similar in these groupings.

Series members between 1801 and 2200
1805 Jul 11 (Saros 126)	1834 Jun 21 (Saros 127)	1863 Jun 01 (Saros 128)
1892 May 11 (Saros 129)	1921 Apr 22 (Saros 130)	1950 Apr 02 (Saros 131)
1979 Mar 13 (Saros 132)	2008 Feb 21 (Saros 133)	2037 Jan 31 (Saros 134)
2066 Jan 11 (Saros 135)	2094 Dec 21 (Saros 136)	2123 Dec 03 (Saros 137)
2152 Nov 12 (Saros 138)	2181 Oct 22 (Saros 139)	

=== Half-Saros cycle ===
A lunar eclipse will be preceded and followed by solar eclipses by 9 years and 5.5 days (a half saros). This lunar eclipse is related to two total solar eclipses of Solar Saros 138.

March 27, 1941	April 8, 1959

== See also ==
- List of lunar eclipses
- List of 20th-century lunar eclipses
