= October 1949 lunar eclipse =

Total lunar eclipse October 7, 1949

- Total eclipse
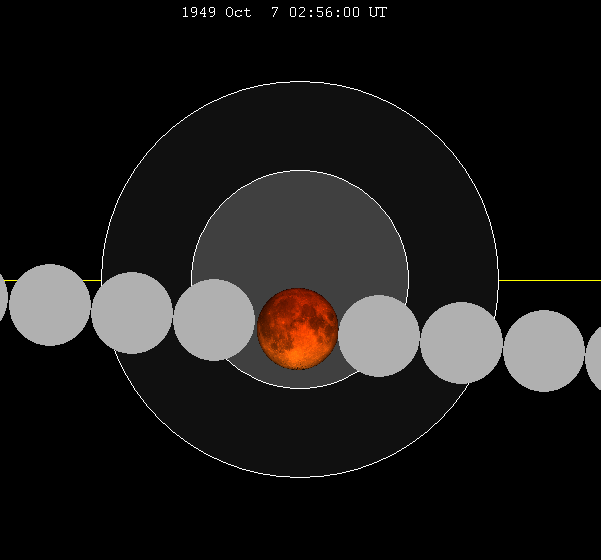
- The Moon's hourly motion shown right to left
- Date: October 7, 1949
- Gamma: −0.3219
- Magnitude: 1.2236
- Saros cycle: 126 (42 of 72)
- Totality: 72 minutes, 50 seconds
- Partiality: 222 minutes, 53 seconds
- Penumbral: 369 minutes, 11 seconds
Contacts (UTC)
- P1: 23:51:50
- U1: 1:04:59
- U2: 2:20:01
- Greatest: 2:56:26
- U3: 3:32:51
- U4: 4:47:52
- P4: 6:01:02

A total lunar eclipse occurred at the Moon’s ascending node of orbit on Friday, October 7, 1949, with an umbral magnitude of 1.2236. A lunar eclipse occurs when the Moon moves into the Earth's shadow, causing the Moon to be darkened. A total lunar eclipse occurs when the Moon's near side entirely passes into the Earth's umbral shadow. Unlike a solar eclipse, which can only be viewed from a relatively small area of the world, a lunar eclipse may be viewed from anywhere on the night side of Earth. A total lunar eclipse can last up to nearly two hours, while a total solar eclipse lasts only a few minutes at any given place, because the Moon's shadow is smaller. Occurring only about 15 hours before apogee (on October 7, 1949, at 18:10 UTC), the Moon's apparent diameter was smaller.

This lunar eclipse was the second of a tetrad, with four total lunar eclipses in series, the others being on April 13, 1949; April 2, 1950; and September 26, 1950.

== Visibility ==
The eclipse was completely visible over eastern North America, South America, and west Africa, and western Europe, seen rising over western North America and the eastern Pacific Ocean and setting over much of Africa, Europe, and west, central, and south Asia.

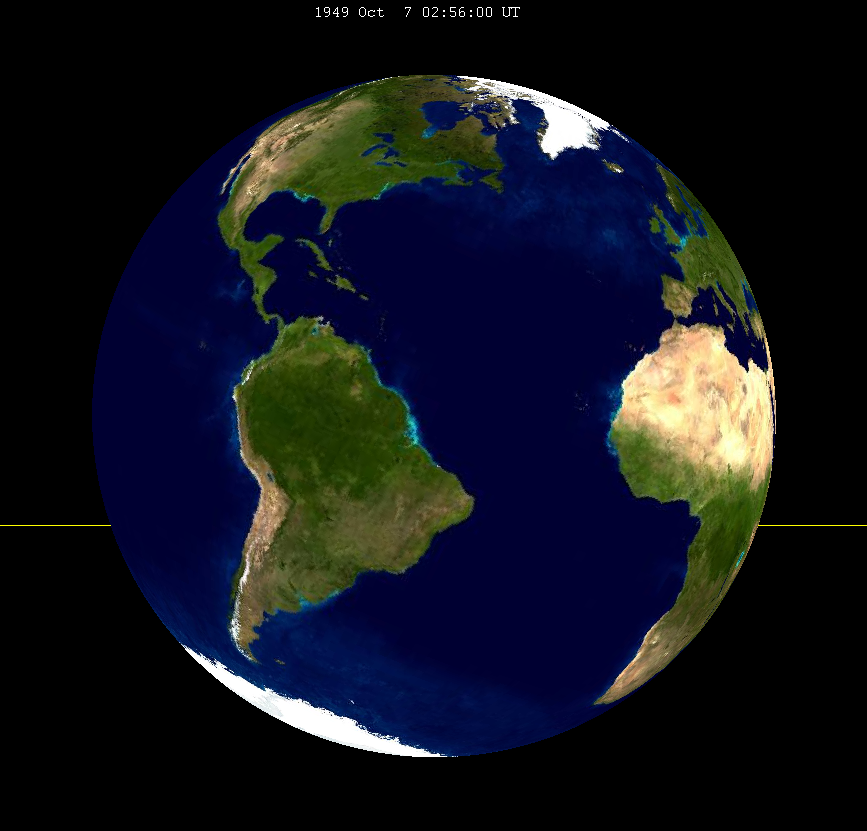
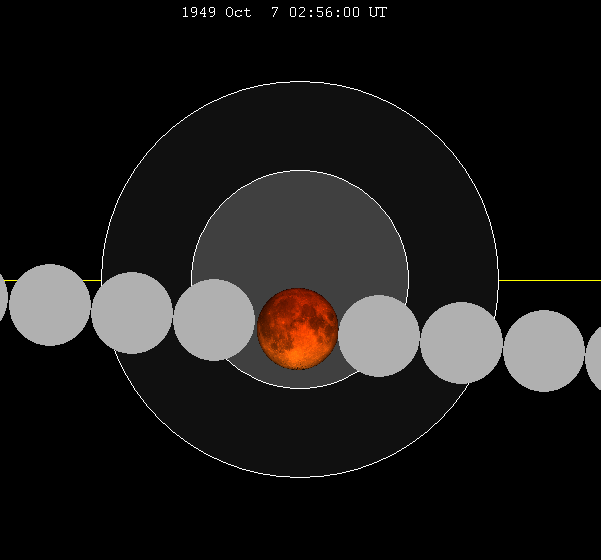

== Eclipse details ==
Shown below is a table displaying details about this particular solar eclipse. It describes various parameters pertaining to this eclipse.

October 7, 1949 Lunar Eclipse Parameters
Parameter	Value
Penumbral Magnitude	2.31179
Umbral Magnitude	1.22363
Gamma	−0.32191
Sun Right Ascension	12h49m43.2s
Sun Declination	-05°20'02.0"
Sun Semi-Diameter	16'00.3"
Sun Equatorial Horizontal Parallax	08.8"
Moon Right Ascension	00h50m16.7s
Moon Declination	+05°04'46.9"
Moon Semi-Diameter	14'42.5"
Moon Equatorial Horizontal Parallax	0°53'58.9"
ΔT	29.0 s

== Eclipse season ==
This eclipse is part of an eclipse season, a period, roughly every six months, when eclipses occur. Only two (or occasionally three) eclipse seasons occur each year, and each season lasts about 35 days and repeats just short of six months (173 days) later; thus two full eclipse seasons always occur each year. Either two or three eclipses happen each eclipse season. In the sequence below, each eclipse is separated by a fortnight.

Eclipse season of October 1949
October 7 Ascending node (full moon)	October 21 Descending node (new moon)
Total lunar eclipse Lunar Saros 126	Partial solar eclipse Solar Saros 152

== Related eclipses ==
=== Eclipses in 1949 ===
- A total lunar eclipse on April 13.
- A partial solar eclipse on April 28.
- A total lunar eclipse on October 7.
- A partial solar eclipse on October 21.

=== Metonic ===
- Preceded by: Lunar eclipse of December 19, 1945
- Followed by: Lunar eclipse of July 26, 1953

=== Tzolkinex ===
- Preceded by: Lunar eclipse of August 26, 1942
- Followed by: Lunar eclipse of November 18, 1956

=== Half-Saros ===
- Preceded by: Solar eclipse of October 1, 1940
- Followed by: Solar eclipse of October 12, 1958

=== Tritos ===
- Preceded by: Lunar eclipse of November 7, 1938
- Followed by: Lunar eclipse of September 5, 1960

=== Lunar Saros 126 ===
- Preceded by: Lunar eclipse of September 26, 1931
- Followed by: Lunar eclipse of October 18, 1967

=== Inex ===
- Preceded by: Lunar eclipse of October 27, 1920
- Followed by: Lunar eclipse of September 16, 1978

=== Triad ===
- Preceded by: Lunar eclipse of December 6, 1862
- Followed by: Lunar eclipse of August 7, 2036

=== Lunar eclipses of 1948–1951 ===
This eclipse is a member of a semester series. An eclipse in a semester series of lunar eclipses repeats approximately every 177 days and 4 hours (a semester) at alternating nodes of the Moon's orbit.

The penumbral lunar eclipses on February 21, 1951 and August 17, 1951 occur in the next lunar year eclipse set.

Lunar eclipse series sets from 1948 to 1951
Descending node				Ascending node			
Saros	Date Viewing	Type Chart	Gamma	Saros	Date Viewing	Type Chart	Gamma
111	1948 Apr 23	Partial	1.0017	116	1948 Oct 18	Penumbral	−1.0245
121	1949 Apr 13	Total	0.2474	126	1949 Oct 07	Total	−0.3219
131	1950 Apr 02	Total	−0.4599	136	1950 Sep 26	Total	0.4101
141	1951 Mar 23	Penumbral	−1.2099	146	1951 Sep 15	Penumbral	1.1187

=== Saros 126 ===
This eclipse is a part of Saros series 126, repeating every 18 years, 11 days, and containing 70 events. The series started with a penumbral lunar eclipse on July 18, 1228. It contains partial eclipses from March 24, 1625 through June 9, 1751; total eclipses from June 19, 1769 through November 9, 2003; and a second set of partial eclipses from November 19, 2021 through June 5, 2346. The series ends at member 70 as a penumbral eclipse on August 19, 2472.

The longest duration of totality was produced by member 36 at 106 minutes, 27 seconds on August 13, 1859. All eclipses in this series occur at the Moon’s ascending node of orbit.

Greatest	First			
The greatest eclipse of the series occurred on 1859 Aug 13, lasting 106 minutes, 27 seconds.	Penumbral	Partial	Total	Central
The greatest eclipse of the series occurred on 1859 Aug 13, lasting 106 minutes, 27 seconds.	1228 Jul 18	1625 Mar 24	1769 Jun 19	1805 Jul 11
The greatest eclipse of the series occurred on 1859 Aug 13, lasting 106 minutes, 27 seconds.	Last			
The greatest eclipse of the series occurred on 1859 Aug 13, lasting 106 minutes, 27 seconds.	Central	Total	Partial	Penumbral
The greatest eclipse of the series occurred on 1859 Aug 13, lasting 106 minutes, 27 seconds.	1931 Sep 26	2003 Nov 09	2346 Jun 05	2472 Aug 19

Eclipses are tabulated in three columns; every third eclipse in the same column is one exeligmos apart, so they all cast shadows over approximately the same parts of the Earth.

Series members 33–54 occur between 1801 and 2200:
33	34	35
1805 Jul 11	1823 Jul 23	1841 Aug 02
36	37	38
1859 Aug 13	1877 Aug 23	1895 Sep 04
39	40	41
1913 Sep 15	1931 Sep 26	1949 Oct 07
42	43	44
1967 Oct 18	1985 Oct 28	2003 Nov 09
45	46	47
2021 Nov 19	2039 Nov 30	2057 Dec 11
48	49	50
2075 Dec 22	2094 Jan 01	2112 Jan 14
51	52	53
2130 Jan 24	2148 Feb 04	2166 Feb 15
54
2184 Feb 26

=== Tritos series ===
This eclipse is a part of a tritos cycle, repeating at alternating nodes every 135 synodic months (≈ 3986.63 days, or 11 years minus 1 month). Their appearance and longitude are irregular due to a lack of synchronization with the anomalistic month (period of perigee), but groupings of 3 tritos cycles (≈ 33 years minus 3 months) come close (≈ 434.044 anomalistic months), so eclipses are similar in these groupings.

Series members between 1801 and 2200
1807 Nov 15 (Saros 113)	1818 Oct 14 (Saros 114)	1829 Sep 13 (Saros 115)	1840 Aug 13 (Saros 116)	1851 Jul 13 (Saros 117)
1862 Jun 12 (Saros 118)	1873 May 12 (Saros 119)	1884 Apr 10 (Saros 120)	1895 Mar 11 (Saros 121)	1906 Feb 09 (Saros 122)
1917 Jan 08 (Saros 123)	1927 Dec 08 (Saros 124)	1938 Nov 07 (Saros 125)	1949 Oct 07 (Saros 126)	1960 Sep 05 (Saros 127)
1971 Aug 06 (Saros 128)	1982 Jul 06 (Saros 129)	1993 Jun 04 (Saros 130)	2004 May 04 (Saros 131)	2015 Apr 04 (Saros 132)
2026 Mar 03 (Saros 133)	2037 Jan 31 (Saros 134)	2048 Jan 01 (Saros 135)	2058 Nov 30 (Saros 136)	2069 Oct 30 (Saros 137)
2080 Sep 29 (Saros 138)	2091 Aug 29 (Saros 139)	2102 Jul 30 (Saros 140)	2113 Jun 29 (Saros 141)	2124 May 28 (Saros 142)
2135 Apr 28 (Saros 143)	2146 Mar 28 (Saros 144)	2157 Feb 24 (Saros 145)	2168 Jan 24 (Saros 146)	2178 Dec 24 (Saros 147)
2189 Nov 22 (Saros 148)	2200 Oct 23 (Saros 149)			

=== Inex series ===
This eclipse is a part of the long period inex cycle, repeating at alternating nodes, every 358 synodic months (≈ 10,571.95 days, or 29 years minus 20 days). Their appearance and longitude are irregular due to a lack of synchronization with the anomalistic month (period of perigee). However, groupings of 3 inex cycles (≈ 87 years minus 2 months) comes close (≈ 1,151.02 anomalistic months), so eclipses are similar in these groupings.

Series members between 1801 and 2200
1805 Jan 15 (Saros 121)	1833 Dec 26 (Saros 122)	1862 Dec 06 (Saros 123)
1891 Nov 16 (Saros 124)	1920 Oct 27 (Saros 125)	1949 Oct 07 (Saros 126)
1978 Sep 16 (Saros 127)	2007 Aug 28 (Saros 128)	2036 Aug 07 (Saros 129)
2065 Jul 17 (Saros 130)	2094 Jun 28 (Saros 131)	2123 Jun 09 (Saros 132)
2152 May 18 (Saros 133)	2181 Apr 29 (Saros 134)	

=== Half-Saros cycle ===
A lunar eclipse will be preceded and followed by solar eclipses by 9 years and 5.5 days (a half saros). This lunar eclipse is related to two total solar eclipses of Solar Saros 133.

October 1, 1940	October 12, 1958

== See also ==
- List of lunar eclipses
- List of 20th-century lunar eclipses
