= April 1968 lunar eclipse =

Total lunar eclipse on April 13, 1968

- Total eclipse
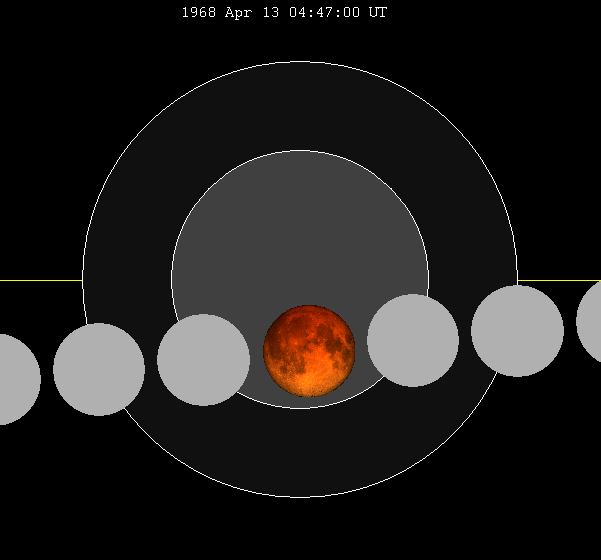
- The Moon's hourly motion shown right to left
- Date: April 13, 1968
- Gamma: −0.4173
- Magnitude: 1.1116
- Saros cycle: 131 (31 of 72)
- Totality: 48 minutes, 31 seconds
- Partiality: 194 minutes, 8 seconds
- Penumbral: 309 minutes, 30 seconds
Contacts (UTC)
- P1: 2:12:37
- U1: 3:10:20
- U2: 4:23:08
- Greatest: 4:47:22
- U3: 5:11:38
- U4: 6:24:27
- P4: 7:22:07

A total lunar eclipse occurred at the Moon’s descending node of orbit on Saturday, April 13, 1968, with an umbral magnitude of 1.1116. A lunar eclipse occurs when the Moon moves into the Earth's shadow, causing the Moon to be darkened. A total lunar eclipse occurs when the Moon's near side entirely passes into the Earth's umbral shadow. Unlike a solar eclipse, which can only be viewed from a relatively small area of the world, a lunar eclipse may be viewed from anywhere on the night side of Earth. A total lunar eclipse can last up to nearly two hours, while a total solar eclipse lasts only a few minutes at any given place, because the Moon's shadow is smaller. Occurring about 1.1 days before perigee (on April 14, 1968, at 7:50 UTC), the Moon's apparent diameter was larger.

This lunar eclipse was the third of a tetrad, with four total lunar eclipses in series, the others being on April 24, 1967; October 18, 1967; and October 6, 1968.

== Visibility ==
The eclipse was completely visible over much of North America and South America, seen rising over northwestern North America and the central Pacific Ocean and setting over Europe, Africa, and the Middle East.

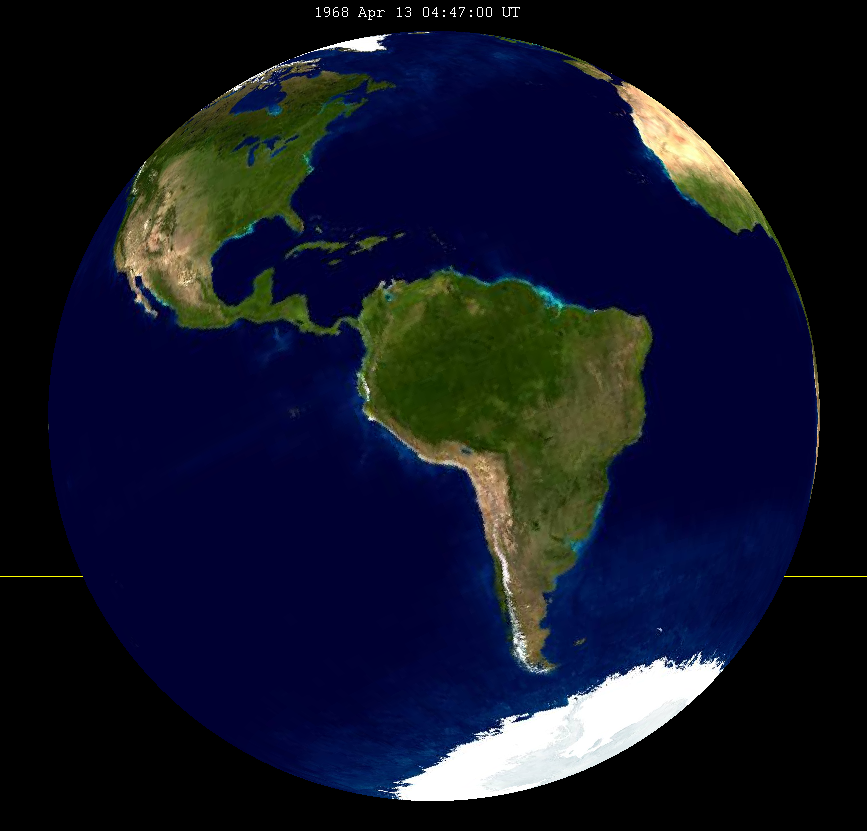
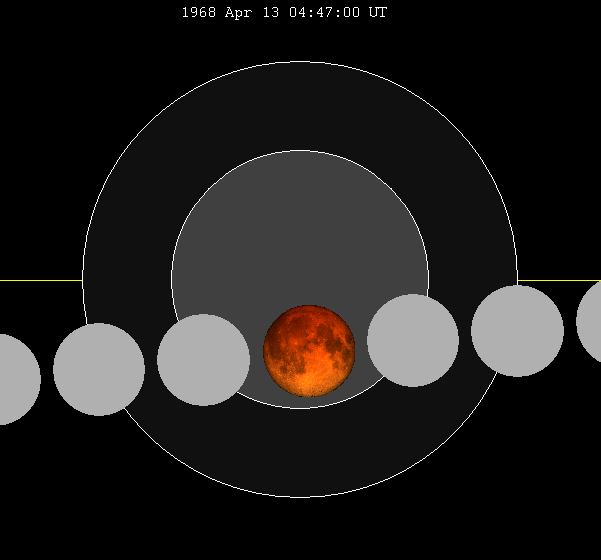

== Eclipse details ==
Shown below is a table displaying details about this particular lunar eclipse. It describes various parameters pertaining to this eclipse.

April 13, 1968 Lunar Eclipse Parameters
Parameter	Value
Penumbral Magnitude	2.07253
Umbral Magnitude	1.11164
Gamma	−0.41732
Sun Right Ascension	01h26m19.6s
Sun Declination	+09°03'48.7"
Sun Semi-Diameter	15'56.9"
Sun Equatorial Horizontal Parallax	08.8"
Moon Right Ascension	13h25m32.2s
Moon Declination	-09°26'23.0"
Moon Semi-Diameter	16'35.8"
Moon Equatorial Horizontal Parallax	1°00'54.7"
ΔT	38.5 s

== Eclipse season ==
This eclipse is part of an eclipse season, a period, roughly every six months, when eclipses occur. Only two (or occasionally three) eclipse seasons occur each year, and each season lasts about 35 days and repeats just short of six months (173 days) later; thus two full eclipse seasons always occur each year. Either two or three eclipses happen each eclipse season. In the sequence below, each eclipse is separated by a fortnight.

Eclipse season of March–April 1968
March 28 Ascending node (new moon)	April 13 Descending node (full moon)
Partial solar eclipse Solar Saros 119	Total lunar eclipse Lunar Saros 131

== Related eclipses ==
=== Eclipses in 1968 ===
- A partial solar eclipse on March 28.
- A total lunar eclipse on April 13.
- A total solar eclipse on September 22.
- A total lunar eclipse on October 6.

=== Metonic ===
- Preceded by: Lunar eclipse of June 25, 1964
- Followed by: Lunar eclipse of January 30, 1972

=== Tzolkinex ===
- Preceded by: Lunar eclipse of March 2, 1961
- Followed by: Lunar eclipse of May 25, 1975

=== Half-Saros ===
- Preceded by: Solar eclipse of April 8, 1959
- Followed by: Solar eclipse of April 18, 1977

=== Tritos ===
- Preceded by: Lunar eclipse of May 13, 1957
- Followed by: Lunar eclipse of March 13, 1979

=== Lunar Saros 131 ===
- Preceded by: Lunar eclipse of April 2, 1950
- Followed by: Lunar eclipse of April 24, 1986

=== Inex ===
- Preceded by: Lunar eclipse of May 3, 1939
- Followed by: Lunar eclipse of March 24, 1997

=== Triad ===
- Preceded by: Lunar eclipse of June 12, 1881
- Followed by: Lunar eclipse of February 11, 2055

=== Lunar eclipses of 1966–1969 ===
This eclipse is a member of a semester series. An eclipse in a semester series of lunar eclipses repeats approximately every 177 days and 4 hours (a semester) at alternating nodes of the Moon's orbit.

The penumbral lunar eclipse on August 27, 1969 occurs in the next lunar year eclipse set.

Lunar eclipse series sets from 1966 to 1969
Descending node				Ascending node			
Saros	Date Viewing	Type Chart	Gamma	Saros	Date Viewing	Type Chart	Gamma
111	1966 May 04	Penumbral	1.0554	116	1966 Oct 29	Penumbral	−1.0600
121	1967 Apr 24	Total	0.2972	126	1967 Oct 18	Total	−0.3653
131	1968 Apr 13	Total	−0.4173	136	1968 Oct 06	Total	0.3605
141	1969 Apr 02	Penumbral	−1.1765	146	1969 Sep 25	Penumbral	1.0656

=== Saros 131 ===
This eclipse is a part of Saros series 131, repeating every 18 years, 11 days, and containing 72 events. The series started with a penumbral lunar eclipse on May 10, 1427. It contains partial eclipses from July 25, 1553 through March 22, 1932; total eclipses from April 2, 1950 through September 3, 2202; and a second set of partial eclipses from September 13, 2220 through April 9, 2563. The series ends at member 72 as a penumbral eclipse on July 7, 2707.

The longest duration of totality will be produced by member 38 at 100 minutes, 36 seconds on June 28, 2094. All eclipses in this series occur at the Moon’s descending node of orbit.

Greatest	First			
The greatest eclipse of the series will occur on 2094 Jun 28, lasting 100 minutes, 36 seconds.	Penumbral	Partial	Total	Central
The greatest eclipse of the series will occur on 2094 Jun 28, lasting 100 minutes, 36 seconds.	1427 May 10	1553 Jul 25	1950 Apr 02	2022 May 16
The greatest eclipse of the series will occur on 2094 Jun 28, lasting 100 minutes, 36 seconds.	Last			
The greatest eclipse of the series will occur on 2094 Jun 28, lasting 100 minutes, 36 seconds.	Central	Total	Partial	Penumbral
The greatest eclipse of the series will occur on 2094 Jun 28, lasting 100 minutes, 36 seconds.	2148 Jul 31	2202 Sep 03	2563 Apr 09	2707 Jul 07

Eclipses are tabulated in three columns; every third eclipse in the same column is one exeligmos apart, so they all cast shadows over approximately the same parts of the Earth.

Series members 22–43 occur between 1801 and 2200:
22	23	24
1806 Jan 05	1824 Jan 16	1842 Jan 26
25	26	27
1860 Feb 07	1878 Feb 17	1896 Feb 28
28	29	30
1914 Mar 12	1932 Mar 22	1950 Apr 02
31	32	33
1968 Apr 13	1986 Apr 24	2004 May 04
34	35	36
2022 May 16	2040 May 26	2058 Jun 06
37	38	39
2076 Jun 17	2094 Jun 28	2112 Jul 09
40	41	42
2130 Jul 21	2148 Jul 31	2166 Aug 11
43
2184 Aug 21

=== Tritos series ===
This eclipse is a part of a tritos cycle, repeating at alternating nodes every 135 synodic months (≈ 3986.63 days, or 11 years minus 1 month). Their appearance and longitude are irregular due to a lack of synchronization with the anomalistic month (period of perigee), but groupings of 3 tritos cycles (≈ 33 years minus 3 months) come close (≈ 434.044 anomalistic months), so eclipses are similar in these groupings.

Series members between 1801 and 2200
1804 Jul 22 (Saros 116)	1815 Jun 21 (Saros 117)	1826 May 21 (Saros 118)	1837 Apr 20 (Saros 119)	1848 Mar 19 (Saros 120)
1859 Feb 17 (Saros 121)	1870 Jan 17 (Saros 122)	1880 Dec 16 (Saros 123)	1891 Nov 16 (Saros 124)	1902 Oct 17 (Saros 125)
1913 Sep 15 (Saros 126)	1924 Aug 14 (Saros 127)	1935 Jul 16 (Saros 128)	1946 Jun 14 (Saros 129)	1957 May 13 (Saros 130)
1968 Apr 13 (Saros 131)	1979 Mar 13 (Saros 132)	1990 Feb 09 (Saros 133)	2001 Jan 09 (Saros 134)	2011 Dec 10 (Saros 135)
2022 Nov 08 (Saros 136)	2033 Oct 08 (Saros 137)	2044 Sep 07 (Saros 138)	2055 Aug 07 (Saros 139)	2066 Jul 07 (Saros 140)
2077 Jun 06 (Saros 141)	2088 May 05 (Saros 142)	2099 Apr 05 (Saros 143)	2110 Mar 06 (Saros 144)	2121 Feb 02 (Saros 145)
2132 Jan 02 (Saros 146)	2142 Dec 03 (Saros 147)	2153 Nov 01 (Saros 148)	2164 Sep 30 (Saros 149)	2175 Aug 31 (Saros 150)
2186 Jul 31 (Saros 151)	2197 Jun 29 (Saros 152)			

=== Inex series ===
This eclipse is a part of the long period inex cycle, repeating at alternating nodes, every 358 synodic months (≈ 10,571.95 days, or 29 years minus 20 days). Their appearance and longitude are irregular due to a lack of synchronization with the anomalistic month (period of perigee). However, groupings of 3 inex cycles (≈ 87 years minus 2 months) comes close (≈ 1,151.02 anomalistic months), so eclipses are similar in these groupings.

Series members between 1801 and 2200
1823 Jul 23 (Saros 126)	1852 Jul 01 (Saros 127)	1881 Jun 12 (Saros 128)
1910 May 24 (Saros 129)	1939 May 03 (Saros 130)	1968 Apr 13 (Saros 131)
1997 Mar 24 (Saros 132)	2026 Mar 03 (Saros 133)	2055 Feb 11 (Saros 134)
2084 Jan 22 (Saros 135)	2113 Jan 02 (Saros 136)	2141 Dec 13 (Saros 137)
2170 Nov 23 (Saros 138)	2199 Nov 02 (Saros 139)	

=== Half-Saros cycle ===
A lunar eclipse will be preceded and followed by solar eclipses by 9 years and 5.5 days (a half saros). This lunar eclipse is related to two annular solar eclipses of Solar Saros 138.

April 8, 1959	April 18, 1977

== See also ==
- List of lunar eclipses
- List of 20th-century lunar eclipses
