= August 1859 lunar eclipse =

Total lunar eclipse

- Total eclipse
- Date: August 13, 1859
- Gamma: 0.0038
- Magnitude: 1.8148
- Saros cycle: 126 (36 of 70)
- Totality: 106 minutes, 28 seconds
- Partiality: 236 minutes, 1 second
- Penumbral: 375 minutes, 1 second
Contacts (UTC)
- P1: 13:26:47
- U1: 14:36:18
- U2: 15:41:04
- Greatest: 16:34:18
- U3: 17:27:32
- U4: 18:32:19
- P4: 19:41:48

A total lunar eclipse occurred at the Moon’s ascending node of orbit on Saturday, August 13, 1859, with an umbral magnitude of 1.8148. A lunar eclipse occurs when the Moon moves into the Earth's shadow, causing the Moon to be darkened. A total lunar eclipse occurs when the Moon's near side entirely passes into the Earth's umbral shadow. Unlike a solar eclipse, which can only be viewed from a relatively small area of the world, a lunar eclipse may be viewed from anywhere on the night side of Earth. A total lunar eclipse can last up to nearly two hours, while a total solar eclipse lasts only a few minutes at any given place, because the Moon's shadow is smaller. Occurring about 1.1 days after apogee (on August 12, 1859, at 17:30 UTC), the Moon's apparent diameter was smaller. The eclipse was obseved by the Aboriginal Australian Ngarrindjeri people, who feared it because they believed it to be the cause of Aboriginal sorcerers.

Totality for this eclipse lasted 106 minutes and 28 seconds, the longest duration since May 3, 459 (106 minutes and 32 seconds). A totality of this length will not occur again until August 19, 4753 (106 minutes and 35 seconds). During the totality of this eclipse, the moon was in the constellation of Capricornus.

== Visibility ==
The eclipse was completely visible over the eastern half of Asia, Australia, and Antarctica, seen rising over west and central Asia, Africa, and Europe and setting over northeast Asia and the central and eastern Pacific Ocean.

== Eclipse details ==
Shown below is a table displaying details about this particular solar eclipse. It describes various parameters pertaining to this eclipse.

August 13, 1859 Lunar Eclipse Parameters
Parameter	Value
Penumbral Magnitude	2.88768
Umbral Magnitude	1.81481
Gamma	0.00383
Sun Right Ascension	09h30m59.9s
Sun Declination	+14°43'05.3"
Sun Semi-Diameter	15'47.6"
Sun Equatorial Horizontal Parallax	08.7"
Moon Right Ascension	21h30m59.5s
Moon Declination	-14°42'54.0"
Moon Semi-Diameter	14'43.2"
Moon Equatorial Horizontal Parallax	0°54'01.4"
ΔT	7.3 s

== Eclipse season ==
This eclipse was part of an eclipse season, a period, roughly every six months, when eclipses occur. Only two (or occasionally three) eclipse seasons occur each year, and each season lasts about 35 days and repeats just short of six months (173 days) later; thus two full eclipse seasons always occur each year. Either two or three eclipses happen each eclipse season. In the sequence below, each eclipse is separated by a fortnight. The first and last eclipse in this sequence is separated by one synodic month.

Eclipse season of July–August 1859
July 29 Descending node (new moon)	August 13 Ascending node (full moon)	August 28 Descending node (new moon)
Partial solar eclipse Solar Saros 114	Total lunar eclipse Lunar Saros 126	Partial solar eclipse Solar Saros 152

== Related eclipses ==
=== Eclipses in 1859 ===
- A partial solar eclipse on February 3.
- A total lunar eclipse on February 17.
- A partial solar eclipse on March 4.
- A partial solar eclipse on July 29.
- A total lunar eclipse on August 13.
- A partial solar eclipse on August 28.

=== Metonic ===
- Preceded by: Lunar eclipse of October 25, 1855
- Followed by: Lunar eclipse of June 1, 1863

=== Tzolkinex ===
- Preceded by: Lunar eclipse of July 1, 1852
- Followed by: Lunar eclipse of September 24, 1866

=== Half-Saros ===
- Preceded by: Solar eclipse of August 7, 1850
- Followed by: Solar eclipse of August 18, 1868

=== Tritos ===
- Preceded by: Lunar eclipse of September 13, 1848
- Followed by: Lunar eclipse of July 12, 1870

=== Lunar Saros 126 ===
- Preceded by: Lunar eclipse of August 2, 1841
- Followed by: Lunar eclipse of August 23, 1877

=== Inex ===
- Preceded by: Lunar eclipse of September 2, 1830
- Followed by: Lunar eclipse of July 23, 1888

=== Triad ===
- Preceded by: Lunar eclipse of October 11, 1772
- Followed by: Lunar eclipse of June 14, 1946

=== Lunar eclipses of 1857–1861 ===
This eclipse is a member of a semester series. An eclipse in a semester series of lunar eclipses repeats approximately every 177 days and 4 hours (a semester) at alternating nodes of the Moon's orbit.

The penumbral lunar eclipses on April 9, 1857 and October 3, 1857 occur in the previous lunar year eclipse set, and the lunar eclipses on December 28, 1860 (penumbral), June 22, 1861 (penumbral), and December 17, 1861 (partial) occur in the next lunar year eclipse set.

Lunar eclipse series sets from 1857 to 1861
Ascending node				Descending node			
Saros	Date Viewing	Type Chart	Gamma	Saros	Date Viewing	Type Chart	Gamma
106	1857 Sep 04	Penumbral	−1.4376	111	1858 Feb 27	Partial	0.8252
116	1858 Aug 24	Partial	−0.7446	121	1859 Feb 17	Total	0.0950
126	1859 Aug 13	Total	0.0038	131	1860 Feb 07	Partial	−0.5790
136	1860 Aug 01	Partial	0.7551	141	1861 Jan 26	Penumbral	−1.2864
146	1861 Jul 21	Penumbral	1.4659				

=== Saros 126 ===
This eclipse is a part of Saros series 126, repeating every 18 years, 11 days, and containing 70 events. The series started with a penumbral lunar eclipse on July 18, 1228. It contains partial eclipses from March 24, 1625 through June 9, 1751; total eclipses from June 19, 1769 through November 9, 2003; and a second set of partial eclipses from November 19, 2021 through June 5, 2346. The series ends at member 70 as a penumbral eclipse on August 19, 2472.

The longest duration of totality was produced by member 36 at 106 minutes, 27 seconds on August 13, 1859. All eclipses in this series occur at the Moon’s ascending node of orbit.

Greatest	First			
The greatest eclipse of the series occurred on 1859 Aug 13, lasting 106 minutes, 27 seconds.	Penumbral	Partial	Total	Central
The greatest eclipse of the series occurred on 1859 Aug 13, lasting 106 minutes, 27 seconds.	1228 Jul 18	1625 Mar 24	1769 Jun 19	1805 Jul 11
The greatest eclipse of the series occurred on 1859 Aug 13, lasting 106 minutes, 27 seconds.	Last			
The greatest eclipse of the series occurred on 1859 Aug 13, lasting 106 minutes, 27 seconds.	Central	Total	Partial	Penumbral
The greatest eclipse of the series occurred on 1859 Aug 13, lasting 106 minutes, 27 seconds.	1931 Sep 26	2003 Nov 09	2346 Jun 05	2472 Aug 19

Eclipses are tabulated in three columns; every third eclipse in the same column is one exeligmos apart, so they all cast shadows over approximately the same parts of the Earth.

Series members 33–54 occur between 1801 and 2200:
33	34	35
1805 Jul 11	1823 Jul 23	1841 Aug 02
36	37	38
1859 Aug 13	1877 Aug 23	1895 Sep 04
39	40	41
1913 Sep 15	1931 Sep 26	1949 Oct 07
42	43	44
1967 Oct 18	1985 Oct 28	2003 Nov 09
45	46	47
2021 Nov 19	2039 Nov 30	2057 Dec 11
48	49	50
2075 Dec 22	2094 Jan 01	2112 Jan 14
51	52	53
2130 Jan 24	2148 Feb 04	2166 Feb 15
54
2184 Feb 26

=== Tritos series ===
This eclipse is a part of a tritos cycle, repeating at alternating nodes every 135 synodic months (≈ 3986.63 days, or 11 years minus 1 month). Their appearance and longitude are irregular due to a lack of synchronization with the anomalistic month (period of perigee), but groupings of 3 tritos cycles (≈ 33 years minus 3 months) come close (≈ 434.044 anomalistic months), so eclipses are similar in these groupings.

Series members between 1801 and 2187
1805 Jan 15 (Saros 121)	1815 Dec 16 (Saros 122)	1826 Nov 14 (Saros 123)	1837 Oct 13 (Saros 124)	1848 Sep 13 (Saros 125)
1859 Aug 13 (Saros 126)	1870 Jul 12 (Saros 127)	1881 Jun 12 (Saros 128)	1892 May 11 (Saros 129)	1903 Apr 12 (Saros 130)
1914 Mar 12 (Saros 131)	1925 Feb 08 (Saros 132)	1936 Jan 08 (Saros 133)	1946 Dec 08 (Saros 134)	1957 Nov 07 (Saros 135)
1968 Oct 06 (Saros 136)	1979 Sep 06 (Saros 137)	1990 Aug 06 (Saros 138)	2001 Jul 05 (Saros 139)	2012 Jun 04 (Saros 140)
2023 May 05 (Saros 141)	2034 Apr 03 (Saros 142)	2045 Mar 03 (Saros 143)	2056 Feb 01 (Saros 144)	2066 Dec 31 (Saros 145)
2077 Nov 29 (Saros 146)	2088 Oct 30 (Saros 147)	2099 Sep 29 (Saros 148)	2110 Aug 29 (Saros 149)	2121 Jul 30 (Saros 150)
2132 Jun 28 (Saros 151)	2143 May 28 (Saros 152)	2154 Apr 28 (Saros 153)		
2187 Jan 24 (Saros 156)

=== Inex series ===
This eclipse is a part of the long period inex cycle, repeating at alternating nodes, every 358 synodic months (≈ 10,571.95 days, or 29 years minus 20 days). Their appearance and longitude are irregular due to a lack of synchronization with the anomalistic month (period of perigee). However, groupings of 3 inex cycles (≈ 87 years minus 2 months) comes close (≈ 1,151.02 anomalistic months), so eclipses are similar in these groupings.

Series members between 1801 and 2200
1801 Sep 22 (Saros 124)	1830 Sep 02 (Saros 125)	1859 Aug 13 (Saros 126)
1888 Jul 23 (Saros 127)	1917 Jul 04 (Saros 128)	1946 Jun 14 (Saros 129)
1975 May 25 (Saros 130)	2004 May 04 (Saros 131)	2033 Apr 14 (Saros 132)
2062 Mar 25 (Saros 133)	2091 Mar 05 (Saros 134)	2120 Feb 14 (Saros 135)
2149 Jan 23 (Saros 136)	2178 Jan 04 (Saros 137)	

== See also ==
- List of lunar eclipses
- Lunar Saros 126
- List of 19th-century lunar eclipses
