= November 2003 lunar eclipse =

Total lunar eclipse

- Total eclipse
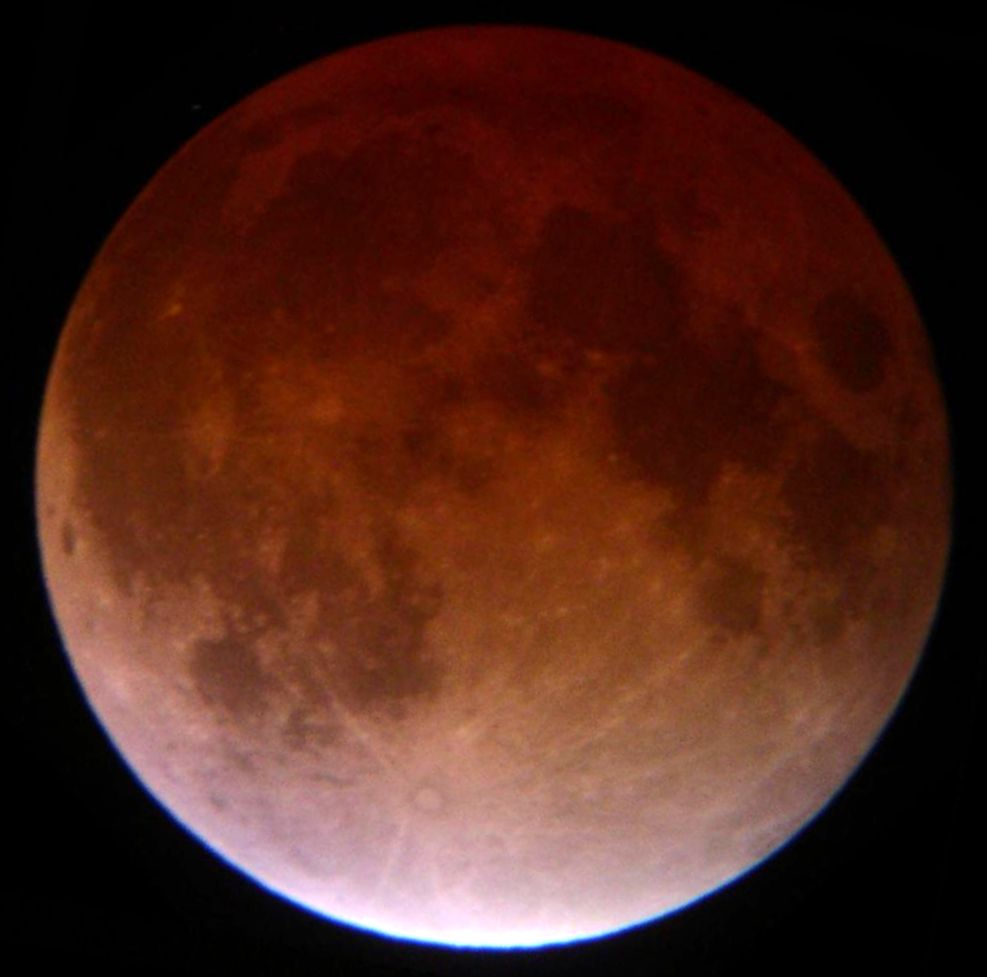
- Totality as viewed from Minneapolis, MN, 1:16 UTC
- Date: November 9, 2003
- Gamma: −0.4319
- Magnitude: 1.0197
- Saros cycle: 126 (44 of 70)
- Totality: 23 minutes, 13 seconds
- Partiality: 212 minutes, 10 seconds
- Penumbral: 364 minutes, 0 seconds
Contacts (UTC)
- P1: 22:16:39 (8 November)
- U1: 23:32:35 (8 November)
- U2: 1:07:12
- Greatest: 1:18:34
- U3: 1:30:25
- U4: 3:04:45
- P4: 4:20:39

A total lunar eclipse occurred at the Moon’s ascending node of orbit on Sunday, November 9, 2003, with an umbral magnitude of 1.0197. A lunar eclipse occurs when the Moon moves into the Earth's shadow, causing the Moon to be darkened. A total lunar eclipse occurs when the Moon's near side entirely passes into the Earth's umbral shadow. Unlike a solar eclipse, which can only be viewed from a relatively small area of the world, a lunar eclipse may be viewed from anywhere on the night side of Earth. A total lunar eclipse can last up to nearly two hours, while a total solar eclipse lasts only a few minutes at any given place, because the Moon's shadow is smaller. Occurring about 1.4 days before apogee (November 10, 2003, at 12:05 UTC), the Moon's apparent diameter was smaller than average.

This lunar eclipse is the second of a tetrad, with four total lunar eclipses in series, the others being on May 16, 2003; May 4, 2004; and October 28, 2004.

This was the last of 14 total lunar eclipses of Lunar Saros 126, which started on June 19, 1769 and ended on November 9, 2003.

== Visibility ==
The eclipse was completely visible over eastern North and South America, much of Africa, and Europe, seen rising over western North and South America and the Pacific Ocean and setting over east Africa and west, central, and south Asia.

Hourly motion shown right to left
The moon's hourly motion across the Earth's shadow in the constellation of Aries

== Gallery ==
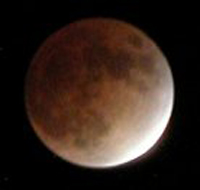
Grand Rapids, MI, 0:58 UT

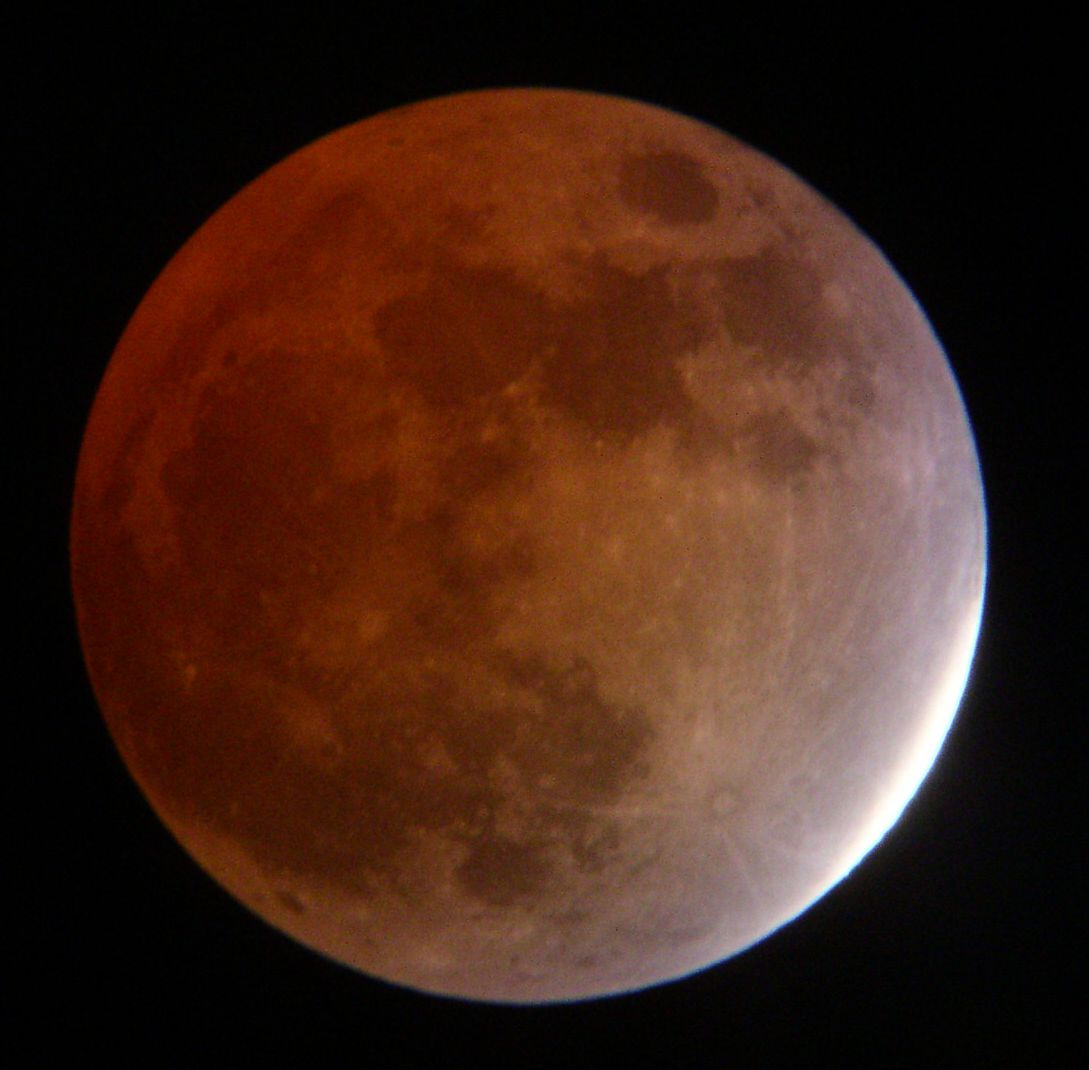
Minneapolis, MN, 1:00 UT

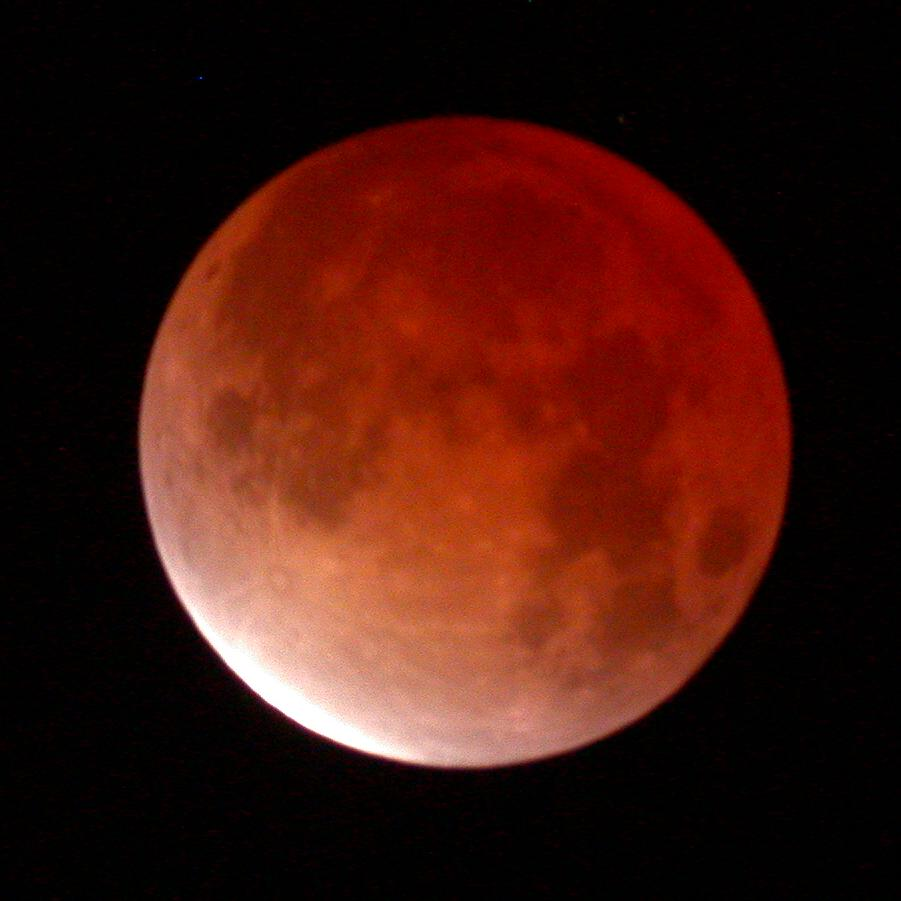
Oudenaarde, Belgium, 1:08 UT

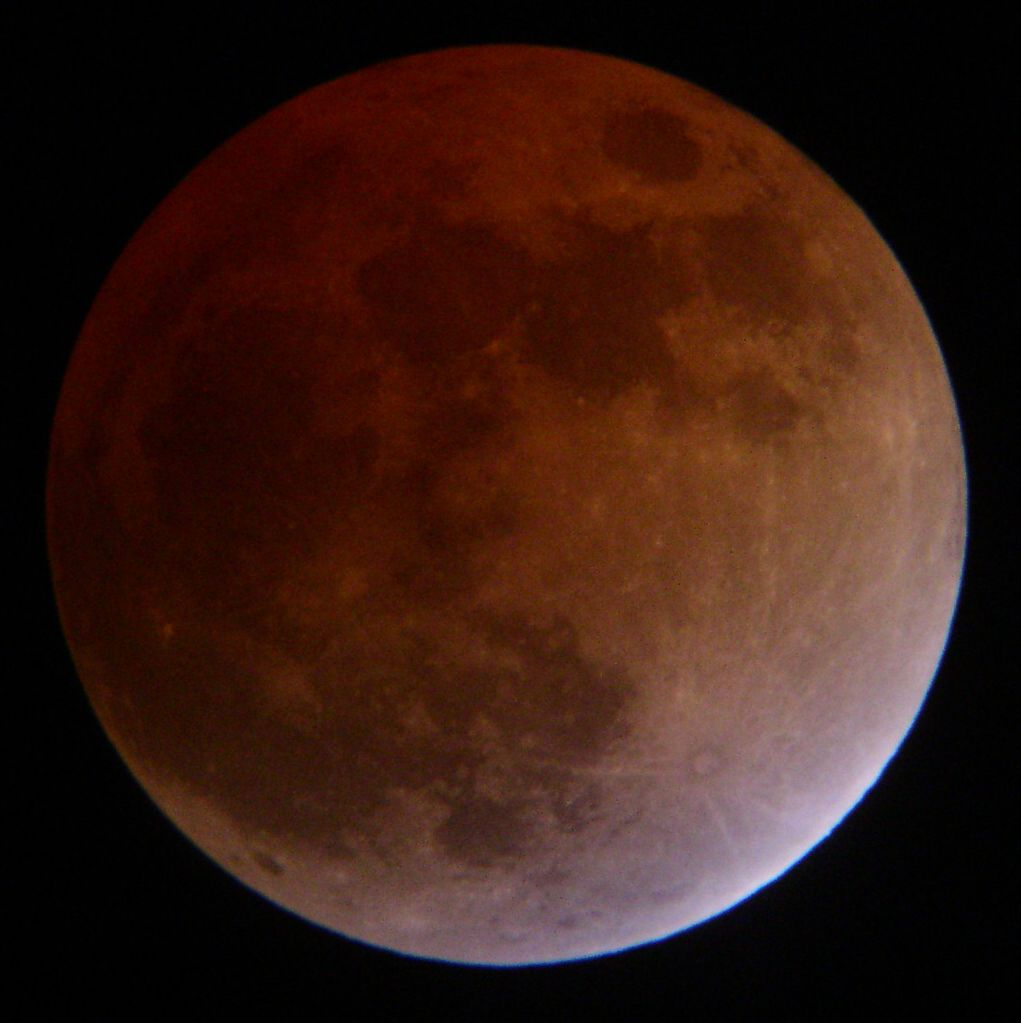
Minneapolis, MN, 1:24 UT

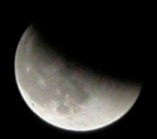
Grand Rapids, MI, 2:28 UT

== Eclipse details ==
Shown below is a table displaying details about this particular lunar eclipse. It describes various parameters pertaining to this eclipse.

November 9, 2003 Lunar Eclipse Parameters
Parameter	Value
Penumbral Magnitude	2.11575
Umbral Magnitude	1.01969
Gamma	−0.43193
Sun Right Ascension	14h54m59.9s
Sun Declination	-16°41'23.6"
Sun Semi-Diameter	16'08.7"
Sun Equatorial Horizontal Parallax	08.9"
Moon Right Ascension	02h55m37.1s
Moon Declination	+16°19'48.8"
Moon Semi-Diameter	14'43.8"
Moon Equatorial Horizontal Parallax	0°54'03.6"
ΔT	64.5 s

== Eclipse season ==
This eclipse is part of an eclipse season, a period, roughly every six months, when eclipses occur. Only two (or occasionally three) eclipse seasons occur each year, and each season lasts about 35 days and repeats just short of six months (173 days) later; thus two full eclipse seasons always occur each year. Either two or three eclipses happen each eclipse season. In the sequence below, each eclipse is separated by a fortnight.

Eclipse season of November 2003
November 9 Ascending node (full moon)	November 23 Descending node (new moon)
Total lunar eclipse Lunar Saros 126	Total solar eclipse Solar Saros 152

== Related eclipses ==
=== Eclipses in 2003 ===
- A total lunar eclipse on May 16.
- An annular solar eclipse on May 31.
- A total lunar eclipse on November 9.
- A total solar eclipse on November 23.

=== Metonic ===
- Preceded by: Lunar eclipse of January 21, 2000
- Followed by: Lunar eclipse of August 28, 2007

=== Tzolkinex ===
- Preceded by: Lunar eclipse of September 27, 1996
- Followed by: Lunar eclipse of December 21, 2010

=== Half-Saros ===
- Preceded by: Solar eclipse of November 3, 1994
- Followed by: Solar eclipse of November 13, 2012

=== Tritos ===
- Preceded by: Lunar eclipse of December 9, 1992
- Followed by: Lunar eclipse of October 8, 2014

=== Lunar Saros 126 ===
- Preceded by: Lunar eclipse of October 28, 1985
- Followed by: Lunar eclipse of November 19, 2021

=== Inex ===
- Preceded by: Lunar eclipse of November 29, 1974
- Followed by: Lunar eclipse of October 18, 2032

=== Triad ===
- Preceded by: Lunar eclipse of January 8, 1917
- Followed by: Lunar eclipse of September 8, 2090

=== Lunar eclipses of 2002–2005 ===
This eclipse is a member of a semester series. An eclipse in a semester series of lunar eclipses repeats approximately every 177 days and 4 hours (a semester) at alternating nodes of the Moon's orbit.

The penumbral lunar eclipse on June 24, 2002 occurs in the previous lunar year eclipse set.

Lunar eclipse series sets from 2002 to 2005
Descending node				Ascending node			
Saros	Date Viewing	Type Chart	Gamma	Saros	Date Viewing	Type Chart	Gamma
111	2002 May 26	Penumbral	1.1759	116	2002 Nov 20	Penumbral	−1.1127
121	2003 May 16	Total	0.4123	126	2003 Nov 09	Total	−0.4319
131	2004 May 04	Total	−0.3132	136	2004 Oct 28	Total	0.2846
141	2005 Apr 24	Penumbral	−1.0885	146	2005 Oct 17	Partial	0.9796

=== Metonic series ===
The Metonic cycle repeats nearly exactly every 19 years and represents a Saros cycle plus one lunar year. Because it occurs on the same calendar date, the Earth's shadow will be in nearly the same location relative to the background stars.

1. 1984 May 15.19 - penumbral (111); 2. 2003 May 16.15 - total (121); 3. 2022 May 16.17 - total (131); 4. 2041 May 16.03 - penumbral (141)	1. 1984 Nov 08.75 - penumbral (116); 2. 2003 Nov 09.05 - total (126); 3. 2022 Nov 08.46 - total (136); 4. 2041 Nov 08.19 - partial (146); 5. 2060 Nov 08.17 - penumbral (156)

=== Saros 126 ===
This eclipse is a part of Saros series 126, repeating every 18 years, 11 days, and containing 70 events. The series started with a penumbral lunar eclipse on July 18, 1228. It contains partial eclipses from March 24, 1625 through June 9, 1751; total eclipses from June 19, 1769 through November 9, 2003; and a second set of partial eclipses from November 19, 2021 through June 5, 2346. The series ends at member 70 as a penumbral eclipse on August 19, 2472.

The longest duration of totality was produced by member 36 at 106 minutes, 27 seconds on August 13, 1859. All eclipses in this series occur at the Moon’s ascending node of orbit.

Greatest	First			
The greatest eclipse of the series occurred on 1859 Aug 13, lasting 106 minutes, 27 seconds.	Penumbral	Partial	Total	Central
The greatest eclipse of the series occurred on 1859 Aug 13, lasting 106 minutes, 27 seconds.	1228 Jul 18	1625 Mar 24	1769 Jun 19	1805 Jul 11
The greatest eclipse of the series occurred on 1859 Aug 13, lasting 106 minutes, 27 seconds.	Last			
The greatest eclipse of the series occurred on 1859 Aug 13, lasting 106 minutes, 27 seconds.	Central	Total	Partial	Penumbral
The greatest eclipse of the series occurred on 1859 Aug 13, lasting 106 minutes, 27 seconds.	1931 Sep 26	2003 Nov 09	2346 Jun 05	2472 Aug 19

Eclipses are tabulated in three columns; every third eclipse in the same column is one exeligmos apart, so they all cast shadows over approximately the same parts of the Earth.

Series members 33–54 occur between 1801 and 2200:
33	34	35
1805 Jul 11	1823 Jul 23	1841 Aug 02
36	37	38
1859 Aug 13	1877 Aug 23	1895 Sep 04
39	40	41
1913 Sep 15	1931 Sep 26	1949 Oct 07
42	43	44
1967 Oct 18	1985 Oct 28	2003 Nov 09
45	46	47
2021 Nov 19	2039 Nov 30	2057 Dec 11
48	49	50
2075 Dec 22	2094 Jan 01	2112 Jan 14
51	52	53
2130 Jan 24	2148 Feb 04	2166 Feb 15
54
2184 Feb 26

=== Tritos series ===
This eclipse is a part of a tritos cycle, repeating at alternating nodes every 135 synodic months (≈ 3986.63 days, or 11 years minus 1 month). Their appearance and longitude are irregular due to a lack of synchronization with the anomalistic month (period of perigee), but groupings of 3 tritos cycles (≈ 33 years minus 3 months) come close (≈ 434.044 anomalistic months), so eclipses are similar in these groupings.

Series members between 1801 and 2200
1807 May 21 (Saros 108)	1818 Apr 21 (Saros 109)	1829 Mar 20 (Saros 110)	1840 Feb 17 (Saros 111)	1851 Jan 17 (Saros 112)
1861 Dec 17 (Saros 113)	1872 Nov 15 (Saros 114)	1883 Oct 16 (Saros 115)	1894 Sep 15 (Saros 116)	1905 Aug 15 (Saros 117)
1916 Jul 15 (Saros 118)	1927 Jun 15 (Saros 119)	1938 May 14 (Saros 120)	1949 Apr 13 (Saros 121)	1960 Mar 13 (Saros 122)
1971 Feb 10 (Saros 123)	1982 Jan 09 (Saros 124)	1992 Dec 09 (Saros 125)	2003 Nov 09 (Saros 126)	2014 Oct 08 (Saros 127)
2025 Sep 07 (Saros 128)	2036 Aug 07 (Saros 129)	2047 Jul 07 (Saros 130)	2058 Jun 06 (Saros 131)	2069 May 06 (Saros 132)
2080 Apr 04 (Saros 133)	2091 Mar 05 (Saros 134)	2102 Feb 03 (Saros 135)	2113 Jan 02 (Saros 136)	2123 Dec 03 (Saros 137)
2134 Nov 02 (Saros 138)	2145 Sep 30 (Saros 139)	2156 Aug 30 (Saros 140)	2167 Aug 01 (Saros 141)	2178 Jun 30 (Saros 142)
2189 May 29 (Saros 143)	2200 Apr 30 (Saros 144)			

=== Inex series ===
This eclipse is a part of the long period inex cycle, repeating at alternating nodes, every 358 synodic months (≈ 10,571.95 days, or 29 years minus 20 days). Their appearance and longitude are irregular due to a lack of synchronization with the anomalistic month (period of perigee). However, groupings of 3 inex cycles (≈ 87 years minus 2 months) comes close (≈ 1,151.02 anomalistic months), so eclipses are similar in these groupings.

Series members between 1801 and 2200
1801 Mar 30 (Saros 119)	1830 Mar 09 (Saros 120)	1859 Feb 17 (Saros 121)
1888 Jan 28 (Saros 122)	1917 Jan 08 (Saros 123)	1945 Dec 19 (Saros 124)
1974 Nov 29 (Saros 125)	2003 Nov 09 (Saros 126)	2032 Oct 18 (Saros 127)
2061 Sep 29 (Saros 128)	2090 Sep 08 (Saros 129)	2119 Aug 20 (Saros 130)
2148 Jul 31 (Saros 131)	2177 Jul 11 (Saros 132)	

=== Half-Saros cycle ===
A lunar eclipse will be preceded and followed by solar eclipses by 9 years and 5.5 days (a half saros). This lunar eclipse is related to two total solar eclipses of Solar Saros 133.

November 3, 1994	November 13, 2012

== See also ==
- List of lunar eclipses and List of 21st-century lunar eclipses
- Solar eclipse of 23 November 2003
- May 2003 lunar eclipse
- May 2004 lunar eclipse
- October 2004 lunar eclipse
