= April 1949 lunar eclipse =

Total lunar eclipse April 13, 1949

- Total eclipse
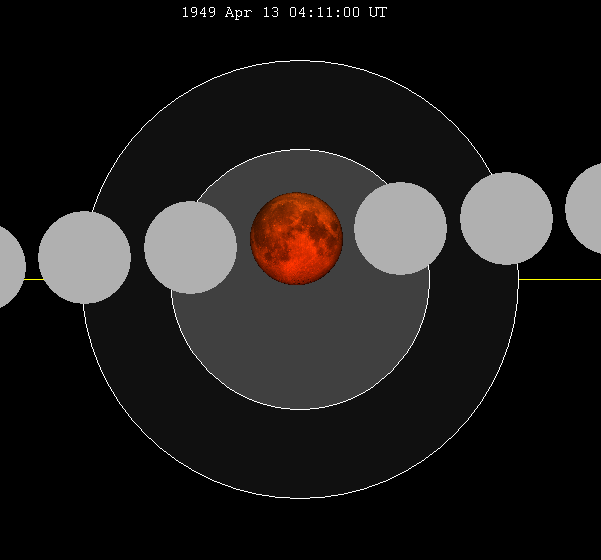
- The Moon's hourly motion shown right to left
- Date: April 13, 1949
- Gamma: 0.2474
- Magnitude: 1.4251
- Saros cycle: 121 (52 of 84)
- Totality: 84 minutes, 56 seconds
- Partiality: 205 minutes, 42 seconds
- Penumbral: 315 minutes, 50 seconds
Contacts (UTC)
- P1: 1:33:02
- U1: 2:28:05
- U2: 3:28:28
- Greatest: 4:10:56
- U3: 4:53:24
- U4: 5:53:47
- P4: 6:48:52

A total lunar eclipse occurred at the Moon’s descending node of orbit on Wednesday, April 13, 1949, with an umbral magnitude of 1.4251. It was a central lunar eclipse, in which part of the Moon passed through the center of the Earth's shadow. A lunar eclipse occurs when the Moon moves into the Earth's shadow, causing the Moon to be darkened. A total lunar eclipse occurs when the Moon's near side entirely passes into the Earth's umbral shadow. Unlike a solar eclipse, which can only be viewed from a relatively small area of the world, a lunar eclipse may be viewed from anywhere on the night side of Earth. A total lunar eclipse can last up to nearly two hours, while a total solar eclipse lasts only a few minutes at any given place, because the Moon's shadow is smaller. Occurring only about 19 hours after perigee (on April 12, 1949, at 9:35 UTC), the Moon's apparent diameter was larger.

This lunar eclipse was the first of a tetrad, with four total lunar eclipses in series, the others being on October 7, 1949; April 2, 1950; and September 26, 1950.

== Visibility ==
The eclipse was completely visible over central and eastern North America, South America, and Antarctica, seen rising over western North America and the central Pacific Ocean and setting over Africa, Europe, and the Middle East.

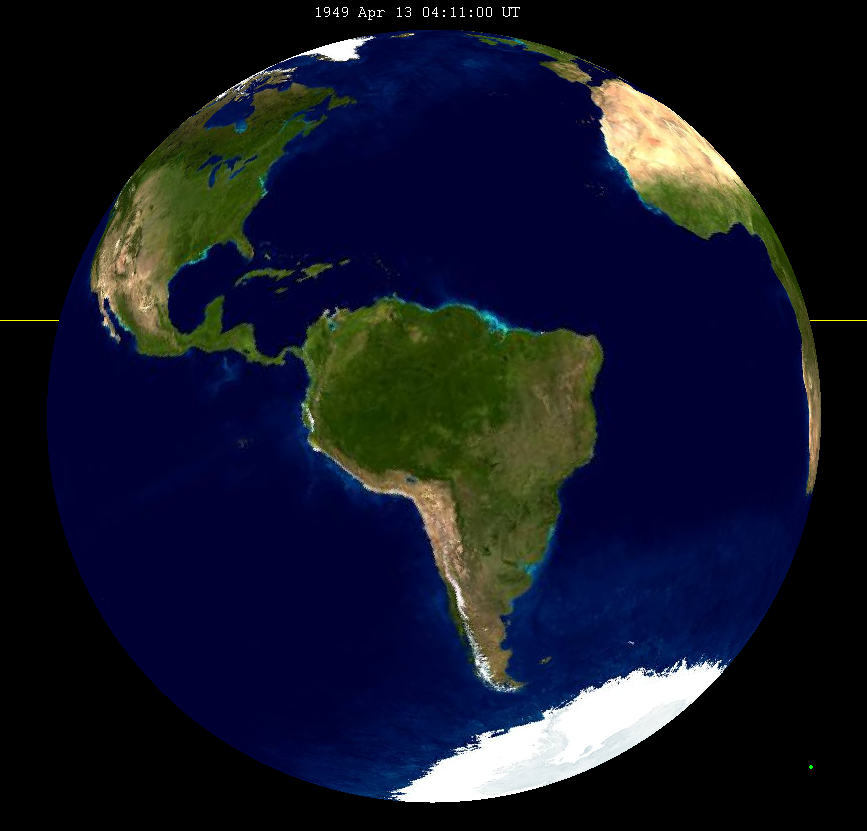
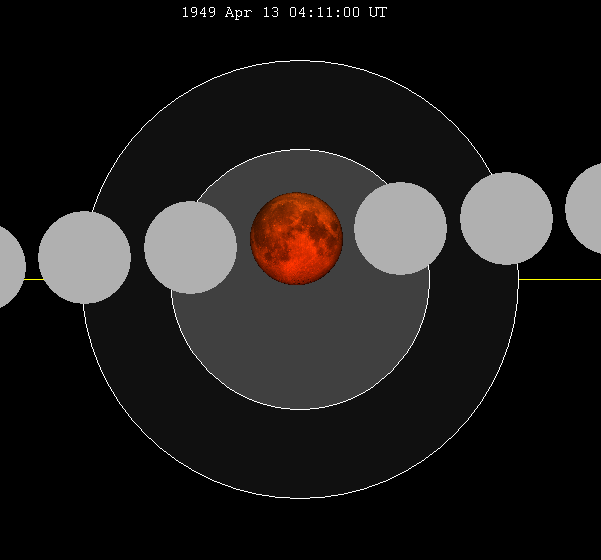

== Eclipse details ==
Shown below is a table displaying details about this particular solar eclipse. It describes various parameters pertaining to this eclipse.

April 13, 1949 Lunar Eclipse Parameters
Parameter	Value
Penumbral Magnitude	2.38255
Umbral Magnitude	1.42511
Gamma	0.24740
Sun Right Ascension	01h24m45.8s
Sun Declination	+08°54'38.8"
Sun Semi-Diameter	15'56.9"
Sun Equatorial Horizontal Parallax	08.8"
Moon Right Ascension	13h25m14.0s
Moon Declination	-08°41'13.4"
Moon Semi-Diameter	16'39.4"
Moon Equatorial Horizontal Parallax	1°01'07.9"
ΔT	28.8 s

== Eclipse season ==
This eclipse is part of an eclipse season, a period, roughly every six months, when eclipses occur. Only two (or occasionally three) eclipse seasons occur each year, and each season lasts about 35 days and repeats just short of six months (173 days) later; thus two full eclipse seasons always occur each year. Either two or three eclipses happen each eclipse season. In the sequence below, each eclipse is separated by a fortnight.

Eclipse season of April 1949
April 13 Descending node (full moon)	April 28 Ascending node (new moon)
Total lunar eclipse Lunar Saros 121	Partial solar eclipse Solar Saros 147

== Related eclipses ==
=== Eclipses in 1949 ===
- A total lunar eclipse on April 13.
- A partial solar eclipse on April 28.
- A total lunar eclipse on October 7.
- A partial solar eclipse on October 21.

=== Metonic ===
- Preceded by: Lunar eclipse of June 25, 1945
- Followed by: Lunar eclipse of January 29, 1953

=== Tzolkinex ===
- Preceded by: Lunar eclipse of March 3, 1942
- Followed by: Lunar eclipse of May 24, 1956

=== Half-Saros ===
- Preceded by: Solar eclipse of April 7, 1940
- Followed by: Solar eclipse of April 19, 1958

=== Tritos ===
- Preceded by: Lunar eclipse of May 14, 1938
- Followed by: Lunar eclipse of March 13, 1960

=== Lunar Saros 121 ===
- Preceded by: Lunar eclipse of April 2, 1931
- Followed by: Lunar eclipse of April 24, 1967

=== Inex ===
- Preceded by: Lunar eclipse of May 3, 1920
- Followed by: Lunar eclipse of March 24, 1978

=== Triad ===
- Preceded by: Lunar eclipse of June 12, 1862
- Followed by: Lunar eclipse of February 11, 2036

=== Lunar eclipses of 1948–1951 ===
This eclipse is a member of a semester series. An eclipse in a semester series of lunar eclipses repeats approximately every 177 days and 4 hours (a semester) at alternating nodes of the Moon's orbit.

The penumbral lunar eclipses on February 21, 1951 and August 17, 1951 occur in the next lunar year eclipse set.

Lunar eclipse series sets from 1948 to 1951
Descending node				Ascending node			
Saros	Date Viewing	Type Chart	Gamma	Saros	Date Viewing	Type Chart	Gamma
111	1948 Apr 23	Partial	1.0017	116	1948 Oct 18	Penumbral	−1.0245
121	1949 Apr 13	Total	0.2474	126	1949 Oct 07	Total	−0.3219
131	1950 Apr 02	Total	−0.4599	136	1950 Sep 26	Total	0.4101
141	1951 Mar 23	Penumbral	−1.2099	146	1951 Sep 15	Penumbral	1.1187

=== Saros 121 ===
This eclipse is a part of Saros series 121, repeating every 18 years, 11 days, and containing 82 events. The series started with a penumbral lunar eclipse on October 6, 1047. It contains partial eclipses from May 10, 1408 through July 3, 1498; total eclipses from July 13, 1516 through May 26, 2021; and a second set of partial eclipses from June 6, 2039 through August 11, 2147. The series ends at member 82 as a penumbral eclipse on March 18, 2508.

The longest duration of totality was produced by member 43 at 100 minutes, 29 seconds on October 18, 1660. All eclipses in this series occur at the Moon’s descending node of orbit.

Greatest	First			
The greatest eclipse of the series occurred on 1660 Oct 18, lasting 100 minutes, 29 seconds.	Penumbral	Partial	Total	Central
The greatest eclipse of the series occurred on 1660 Oct 18, lasting 100 minutes, 29 seconds.	1047 Oct 06	1408 May 10	1516 Jul 13	1570 Aug 15
The greatest eclipse of the series occurred on 1660 Oct 18, lasting 100 minutes, 29 seconds.	Last			
The greatest eclipse of the series occurred on 1660 Oct 18, lasting 100 minutes, 29 seconds.	Central	Total	Partial	Penumbral
The greatest eclipse of the series occurred on 1660 Oct 18, lasting 100 minutes, 29 seconds.	1949 Apr 13	2021 May 26	2147 Aug 11	2508 Mar 18

Eclipses are tabulated in three columns; every third eclipse in the same column is one exeligmos apart, so they all cast shadows over approximately the same parts of the Earth.

Series members 43–64 occur between 1801 and 2200:
43	44	45
1805 Jan 15	1823 Jan 26	1841 Feb 06
46	47	48
1859 Feb 17	1877 Feb 27	1895 Mar 11
49	50	51
1913 Mar 22	1931 Apr 02	1949 Apr 13
52	53	54
1967 Apr 24	1985 May 04	2003 May 16
55	56	57
2021 May 26	2039 Jun 06	2057 Jun 17
58	59	60
2075 Jun 28	2093 Jul 08	2111 Jul 21
61	62	63
2129 Jul 31	2147 Aug 11	2165 Aug 21
64
2183 Sep 02

=== Tritos series ===
This eclipse is a part of a tritos cycle, repeating at alternating nodes every 135 synodic months (≈ 3986.63 days, or 11 years minus 1 month). Their appearance and longitude are irregular due to a lack of synchronization with the anomalistic month (period of perigee), but groupings of 3 tritos cycles (≈ 33 years minus 3 months) come close (≈ 434.044 anomalistic months), so eclipses are similar in these groupings.

Series members between 1801 and 2200
1807 May 21 (Saros 108)	1818 Apr 21 (Saros 109)	1829 Mar 20 (Saros 110)	1840 Feb 17 (Saros 111)	1851 Jan 17 (Saros 112)
1861 Dec 17 (Saros 113)	1872 Nov 15 (Saros 114)	1883 Oct 16 (Saros 115)	1894 Sep 15 (Saros 116)	1905 Aug 15 (Saros 117)
1916 Jul 15 (Saros 118)	1927 Jun 15 (Saros 119)	1938 May 14 (Saros 120)	1949 Apr 13 (Saros 121)	1960 Mar 13 (Saros 122)
1971 Feb 10 (Saros 123)	1982 Jan 09 (Saros 124)	1992 Dec 09 (Saros 125)	2003 Nov 09 (Saros 126)	2014 Oct 08 (Saros 127)
2025 Sep 07 (Saros 128)	2036 Aug 07 (Saros 129)	2047 Jul 07 (Saros 130)	2058 Jun 06 (Saros 131)	2069 May 06 (Saros 132)
2080 Apr 04 (Saros 133)	2091 Mar 05 (Saros 134)	2102 Feb 03 (Saros 135)	2113 Jan 02 (Saros 136)	2123 Dec 03 (Saros 137)
2134 Nov 02 (Saros 138)	2145 Sep 30 (Saros 139)	2156 Aug 30 (Saros 140)	2167 Aug 01 (Saros 141)	2178 Jun 30 (Saros 142)
2189 May 29 (Saros 143)	2200 Apr 30 (Saros 144)			

=== Inex series ===
This eclipse is a part of the long period inex cycle, repeating at alternating nodes, every 358 synodic months (≈ 10,571.95 days, or 29 years minus 20 days). Their appearance and longitude are irregular due to a lack of synchronization with the anomalistic month (period of perigee). However, groupings of 3 inex cycles (≈ 87 years minus 2 months) comes close (≈ 1,151.02 anomalistic months), so eclipses are similar in these groupings.

Series members between 1801 and 2200
1804 Jul 22 (Saros 116)	1833 Jul 02 (Saros 117)	1862 Jun 12 (Saros 118)
1891 May 23 (Saros 119)	1920 May 03 (Saros 120)	1949 Apr 13 (Saros 121)
1978 Mar 24 (Saros 122)	2007 Mar 03 (Saros 123)	2036 Feb 11 (Saros 124)
2065 Jan 22 (Saros 125)	2094 Jan 01 (Saros 126)	2122 Dec 13 (Saros 127)
2151 Nov 24 (Saros 128)	2180 Nov 02 (Saros 129)	

=== Half-Saros cycle ===
A lunar eclipse will be preceded and followed by solar eclipses by 9 years and 5.5 days (a half saros). This lunar eclipse is related to two total solar eclipses of Solar Saros 128.

April 7, 1940	April 19, 1958

== See also ==
- List of lunar eclipses
- List of 20th-century lunar eclipses
