= November 2039 lunar eclipse =

Astronomical event

- Partial eclipse
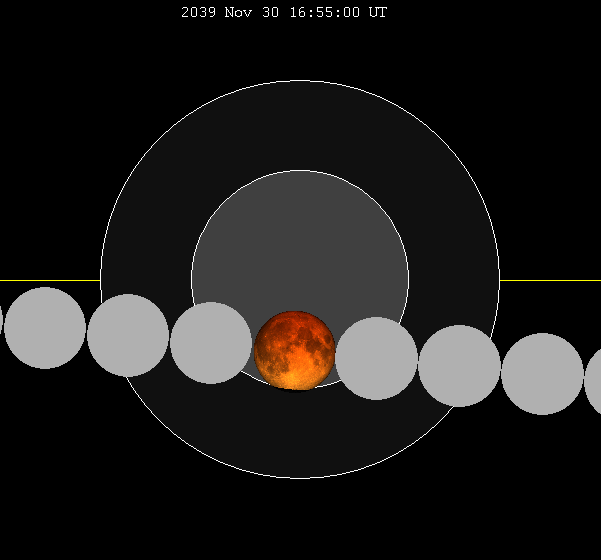
- The Moon's hourly motion shown right to left
- Date: November 30, 2039
- Gamma: −0.4721
- Magnitude: 0.9443
- Saros cycle: 126 (47 of 72)
- Partiality: 206 minutes, 0 seconds
- Penumbral: 360 minutes, 5 seconds
Contacts (UTC)
- P1: 13:56:25
- U1: 15:13:28
- Greatest: 16:56:28
- U4: 18:39:28
- P4: 19:56:31

A partial lunar eclipse will occur at the Moon’s ascending node of orbit on Wednesday, November 30, 2039, with an umbral magnitude of 0.9443. A lunar eclipse occurs when the Moon moves into the Earth's shadow, causing the Moon to be darkened. A partial lunar eclipse occurs when one part of the Moon is in the Earth's umbra, while the other part is in the Earth's penumbra. Unlike a solar eclipse, which can only be viewed from a relatively small area of the world, a lunar eclipse may be viewed from anywhere on the night side of Earth. Occurring about 1.8 days before apogee (on December 2, 2039, at 11:10 UTC), the Moon's apparent diameter will be smaller.

== Visibility ==
The eclipse will be completely visible over northern Europe, Asia, and Australia, seen rising over Africa and western Europe and setting over the central Pacific Ocean and western North America.

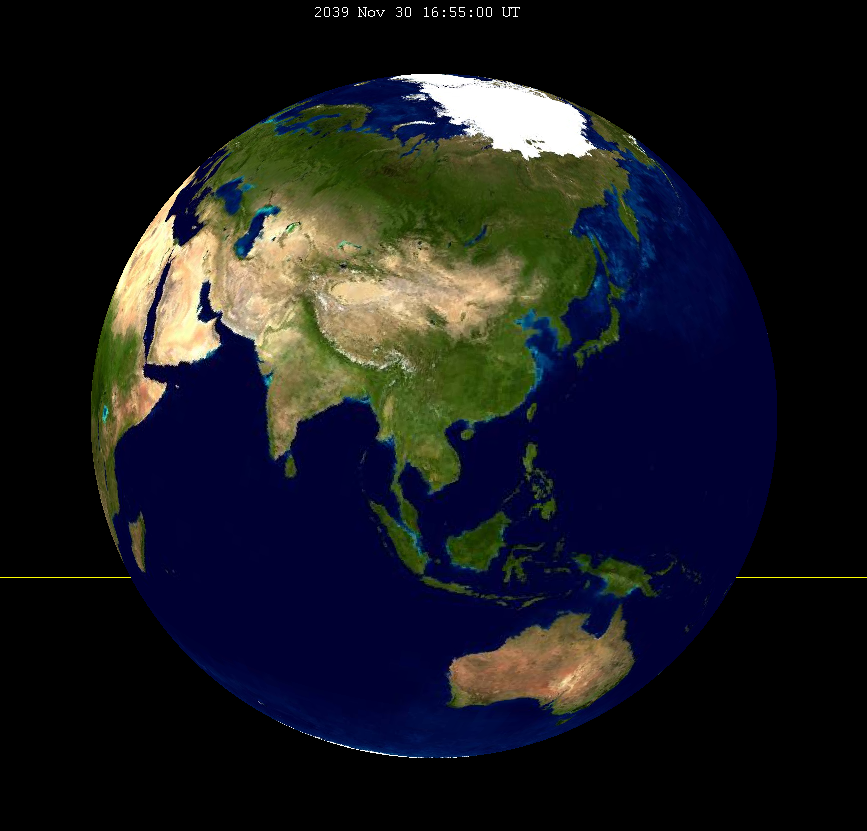
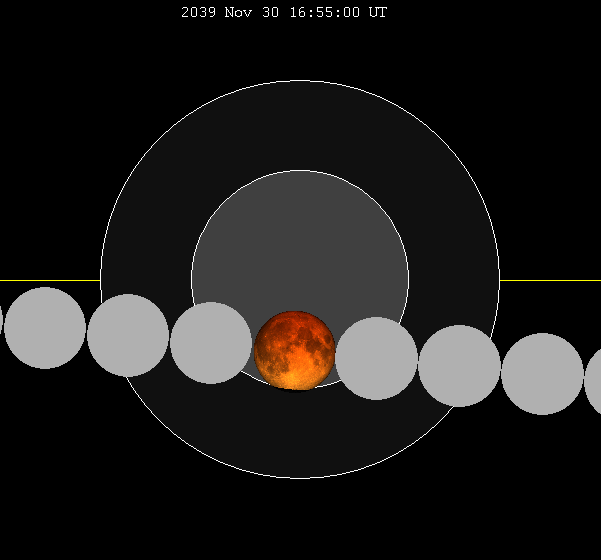

== Eclipse details ==
Shown below is a table displaying details about this particular lunar eclipse. It describes various parameters pertaining to this eclipse.

November 30, 2039 Lunar Eclipse Parameters
Parameter	Value
Penumbral Magnitude	2.04346
Umbral Magnitude	0.94433
Gamma	−0.47210
Sun Right Ascension	16h26m20.8s
Sun Declination	-21°41'27.9"
Sun Semi-Diameter	16'13.0"
Sun Equatorial Horizontal Parallax	08.9"
Moon Right Ascension	04h26m48.9s
Moon Declination	+21°16'45.4"
Moon Semi-Diameter	14'45.3"
Moon Equatorial Horizontal Parallax	0°54'08.9"
ΔT	79.1 s

== Eclipse season ==
This eclipse is part of an eclipse season, a period, roughly every six months, when eclipses occur. Only two (or occasionally three) eclipse seasons occur each year, and each season lasts about 35 days and repeats just short of six months (173 days) later; thus two full eclipse seasons always occur each year. Either two or three eclipses happen each eclipse season. In the sequence below, each eclipse is separated by a fortnight.

Eclipse season of November–December 2039
November 30 Ascending node (full moon)	December 15 Descending node (new moon)
Partial lunar eclipse Lunar Saros 126	Total solar eclipse Solar Saros 152

== Related eclipses ==
=== Eclipses in 2039 ===
- A partial lunar eclipse on June 6.
- An annular solar eclipse on June 21.
- A partial lunar eclipse on November 30.
- A total solar eclipse on December 15.

=== Metonic ===
- Preceded by: Lunar eclipse of February 11, 2036
- Followed by: Lunar eclipse of September 19, 2043

=== Tzolkinex ===
- Preceded by: Lunar eclipse of October 18, 2032
- Followed by: Lunar eclipse of January 12, 2047

=== Half-Saros ===
- Preceded by: Solar eclipse of November 25, 2030
- Followed by: Solar eclipse of December 5, 2048

=== Tritos ===
- Preceded by: Lunar eclipse of December 31, 2028
- Followed by: Lunar eclipse of October 30, 2050

=== Lunar Saros 126 ===
- Preceded by: Lunar eclipse of November 19, 2021
- Followed by: Lunar eclipse of December 11, 2057

=== Inex ===
- Preceded by: Lunar eclipse of December 21, 2010
- Followed by: Lunar eclipse of November 9, 2068

=== Triad ===
- Preceded by: Lunar eclipse of January 29, 1953
- Followed by: Lunar eclipse of October 1, 2126

=== Lunar eclipses of 2038–2042 ===
This eclipse is a member of a semester series. An eclipse in a semester series of lunar eclipses repeats approximately every 177 days and 4 hours (a semester) at alternating nodes of the Moon's orbit.

The penumbral lunar eclipses on January 21, 2038 and July 16, 2038 occur in the previous lunar year eclipse set, and the penumbral lunar eclipses on April 5, 2042 and September 29, 2042 occur in the next lunar year eclipse set.

Lunar eclipse series sets from 2038 to 2042
Descending node				Ascending node			
Saros	Date Viewing	Type Chart	Gamma	Saros	Date Viewing	Type Chart	Gamma
111	2038 Jun 17	Penumbral	1.3082	116	2038 Dec 11	Penumbral	−1.1448
121	2039 Jun 06	Partial	0.5460	126	2039 Nov 30	Partial	−0.4721
131	2040 May 26	Total	−0.1872	136	2040 Nov 18	Total	0.2361
141	2041 May 16	Partial	−0.9746	146	2041 Nov 08	Partial	0.9212
				156	2042 Oct 28	Penumbral	−

=== Saros 126 ===
This eclipse is a part of Saros series 126, repeating every 18 years, 11 days, and containing 70 events. The series started with a penumbral lunar eclipse on July 18, 1228. It contains partial eclipses from March 24, 1625 through June 9, 1751; total eclipses from June 19, 1769 through November 9, 2003; and a second set of partial eclipses from November 19, 2021 through June 5, 2346. The series ends at member 70 as a penumbral eclipse on August 19, 2472.

The longest duration of totality was produced by member 36 at 106 minutes, 27 seconds on August 13, 1859. All eclipses in this series occur at the Moon’s ascending node of orbit.

Greatest	First			
The greatest eclipse of the series occurred on 1859 Aug 13, lasting 106 minutes, 27 seconds.	Penumbral	Partial	Total	Central
The greatest eclipse of the series occurred on 1859 Aug 13, lasting 106 minutes, 27 seconds.	1228 Jul 18	1625 Mar 24	1769 Jun 19	1805 Jul 11
The greatest eclipse of the series occurred on 1859 Aug 13, lasting 106 minutes, 27 seconds.	Last			
The greatest eclipse of the series occurred on 1859 Aug 13, lasting 106 minutes, 27 seconds.	Central	Total	Partial	Penumbral
The greatest eclipse of the series occurred on 1859 Aug 13, lasting 106 minutes, 27 seconds.	1931 Sep 26	2003 Nov 09	2346 Jun 05	2472 Aug 19

Eclipses are tabulated in three columns; every third eclipse in the same column is one exeligmos apart, so they all cast shadows over approximately the same parts of the Earth.

Series members 33–54 occur between 1801 and 2200:
33	34	35
1805 Jul 11	1823 Jul 23	1841 Aug 02
36	37	38
1859 Aug 13	1877 Aug 23	1895 Sep 04
39	40	41
1913 Sep 15	1931 Sep 26	1949 Oct 07
42	43	44
1967 Oct 18	1985 Oct 28	2003 Nov 09
45	46	47
2021 Nov 19	2039 Nov 30	2057 Dec 11
48	49	50
2075 Dec 22	2094 Jan 01	2112 Jan 14
51	52	53
2130 Jan 24	2148 Feb 04	2166 Feb 15
54
2184 Feb 26

=== Tritos series ===
This eclipse is a part of a tritos cycle, repeating at alternating nodes every 135 synodic months (≈ 3986.63 days, or 11 years minus 1 month). Their appearance and longitude are irregular due to a lack of synchronization with the anomalistic month (period of perigee), but groupings of 3 tritos cycles (≈ 33 years minus 3 months) come close (≈ 434.044 anomalistic months), so eclipses are similar in these groupings.

Series members between 1801 and 2200
1810 Sep 13 (Saros 105)	1821 Aug 13 (Saros 106)	1832 Jul 12 (Saros 107)	1843 Jun 12 (Saros 108)	1854 May 12 (Saros 109)
1865 Apr 11 (Saros 110)	1876 Mar 10 (Saros 111)	1887 Feb 08 (Saros 112)	1898 Jan 08 (Saros 113)	1908 Dec 07 (Saros 114)
1919 Nov 07 (Saros 115)	1930 Oct 07 (Saros 116)	1941 Sep 05 (Saros 117)	1952 Aug 05 (Saros 118)	1963 Jul 06 (Saros 119)
1974 Jun 04 (Saros 120)	1985 May 04 (Saros 121)	1996 Apr 04 (Saros 122)	2007 Mar 03 (Saros 123)	2018 Jan 31 (Saros 124)
2028 Dec 31 (Saros 125)	2039 Nov 30 (Saros 126)	2050 Oct 30 (Saros 127)	2061 Sep 29 (Saros 128)	2072 Aug 28 (Saros 129)
2083 Jul 29 (Saros 130)	2094 Jun 28 (Saros 131)	2105 May 28 (Saros 132)	2116 Apr 27 (Saros 133)	2127 Mar 28 (Saros 134)
2138 Feb 24 (Saros 135)	2149 Jan 23 (Saros 136)	2159 Dec 24 (Saros 137)	2170 Nov 23 (Saros 138)	2181 Oct 22 (Saros 139)
2192 Sep 21 (Saros 140)

=== Inex series ===
This eclipse is a part of the long period inex cycle, repeating at alternating nodes, every 358 synodic months (≈ 10,571.95 days, or 29 years minus 20 days). Their appearance and longitude are irregular due to a lack of synchronization with the anomalistic month (period of perigee). However, groupings of 3 inex cycles (≈ 87 years minus 2 months) comes close (≈ 1,151.02 anomalistic months), so eclipses are similar in these groupings.

Series members between 1801 and 2200
1808 May 10 (Saros 118)	1837 Apr 20 (Saros 119)	1866 Mar 31 (Saros 120)
1895 Mar 11 (Saros 121)	1924 Feb 20 (Saros 122)	1953 Jan 29 (Saros 123)
1982 Jan 09 (Saros 124)	2010 Dec 21 (Saros 125)	2039 Nov 30 (Saros 126)
2068 Nov 09 (Saros 127)	2097 Oct 21 (Saros 128)	2126 Oct 01 (Saros 129)
2155 Sep 11 (Saros 130)	2184 Aug 21 (Saros 131)	

=== Half-Saros cycle ===
A lunar eclipse will be preceded and followed by solar eclipses by 9 years and 5.5 days (a half saros). This lunar eclipse is related to two total solar eclipses of Solar Saros 133.

November 25, 2030	December 5, 2048

== See also ==
- List of lunar eclipses and List of 21st-century lunar eclipses
