= Lunar Saros 126 =

Series of lunar eclipses

Member 44	Member 45
2003 Nov 09	2021 Nov 19

Saros cycle series 126 for lunar eclipses occurs at the moon's ascending node, 18 years 11 and 1/3 days. It contains 70 member events, with 14 total eclipses, starting in 1769 and ending in 2003.

This lunar saros is linked to Solar Saros 133.

== List ==
Cat.	Saros	Mem	Date	Time UT (hr:mn)	Type	Gamma	Magnitude	Duration (min)			Contacts UT (hr:mn)						Chart
Cat.	Saros	Mem	Date	Greatest	Type	Gamma	Magnitude	Pen.	Par.	Tot.	P1	P4	U1	U2	U3	U4	Chart
07795	126	1	1228 Jul 18	18:28:45	Penumbral	1.4996	-0.8858	87.1			17:45:12	19:12:18					
07840	126	2	1246 Jul 30	1:46:44	Penumbral	1.4376	-0.7746	128.0			0:42:44	2:50:44					
07885	126	3	1264 Aug 09	9:08:46	Penumbral	1.3792	-0.6701	156.5			7:50:31	10:27:01					
07930	126	4	1282 Aug 20	16:34:27	Penumbral	1.3244	-0.5725	178.9			15:05:00	18:03:54					
07975	126	5	1300 Aug 31	0:06:34	Penumbral	1.2753	-0.4854	196.5			22:28:19	1:44:49					
08018	126	6	1318 Sep 11	7:44:46	Penumbral	1.2321	-0.4092	210.8			5:59:22	9:30:10					
08060	126	7	1336 Sep 21	15:30:34	Penumbral	1.1952	-0.3447	222.3			13:39:25	17:21:43					
08102	126	8	1354 Oct 02	23:21:57	Penumbral	1.1637	-0.2900	231.8			21:26:03	1:17:51					
08143	126	9	1372 Oct 13	7:21:39	Penumbral	1.1395	-0.2487	239.1			5:22:06	9:21:12					
08184	126	10	1390 Oct 24	15:27:20	Penumbral	1.1210	-0.2176	244.9			13:24:53	17:29:47					
08225	126	11	1408 Nov 03	23:39:10	Penumbral	1.1080	-0.1965	249.2			21:34:34	1:43:46					
08266	126	12	1426 Nov 15	7:55:22	Penumbral	1.0992	-0.1830	252.5			5:49:07	10:01:37					
08308	126	13	1444 Nov 25	16:15:51	Penumbral	1.0945	-0.1764	254.8			14:08:27	18:23:15					
08349	126	14	1462 Dec 07	0:38:21	Penumbral	1.0920	-0.1738	256.5			22:30:06	2:46:36					
08389	126	15	1480 Dec 17	9:00:49	Penumbral	1.0903	-0.1722	258.0			6:51:49	11:09:49					
08429	126	16	1498 Dec 28	17:22:57	Penumbral	1.0890	-0.1710	259.3			15:13:18	19:32:36					
08469	126	17	1517 Jan 08	1:41:58	Penumbral	1.0862	-0.1668	260.9			23:31:31	3:52:25					
08510	126	18	1535 Jan 19	9:56:17	Penumbral	1.0800	-0.1560	263.1			7:44:44	12:07:50					
08552	126	19	1553 Jan 29	18:03:50	Penumbral	1.0690	-0.1363	266.2			15:50:44	20:16:56					
08596	126	20	1571 Feb 10	2:04:37	Penumbral	1.0535	-0.1079	270.2			23:49:31	4:19:43					
08639	126	21	1589 Mar 02	9:56:49	Penumbral	1.0319	-0.0681	275.3			7:39:10	12:14:28					
08682	126	22	1607 Mar 13	17:38:53	Penumbral	1.0028	-0.0145	281.6			15:18:05	19:59:41					
08727	126	23	1625 Mar 24	1:11:28	Partial	0.9665	0.0524	289.0	55.0		22:46:58	3:35:58	0:43:58			1:38:58	
08771	126	24	1643 Apr 04	8:33:34	Partial	0.9222	0.1341	297.3	87.2		6:04:55	11:02:13	7:49:58			9:17:10	
08816	126	25	1661 Apr 14	15:46:19	Partial	0.8708	0.2286	306.2	112.5		13:13:13	18:19:25	14:50:04			16:42:34	
08861	126	26	1679 Apr 25	22:48:29	Partial	0.8115	0.3379	315.6	134.9		20:10:41	1:26:17	21:41:02			23:55:56	
08907	126	27	1697 May 6	5:42:53	Partial	0.7461	0.4581	324.9	154.5		3:00:26	8:25:20	4:25:38			7:00:08	
08953	126	28	1715 May 18	12:28:52	Partial	0.6739	0.5906	334.1	172.1		9:41:49	15:15:55	11:02:49			13:54:55	
09000	126	29	1733 May 28	19:08:10	Partial	0.5966	0.7324	342.8	187.6		16:16:46	21:59:34	17:34:22			20:41:58	
09047	126	30	1751 Jun 09	1:41:59	Partial	0.5150	0.8819	350.7	200.8		22:46:38	4:37:20	0:01:35			3:22:23	
09094	126	31	1769 Jun 19	8:11:40	Total	0.4302	1.0372	357.6	211.9	31.5	5:12:52	11:10:28	6:25:43	7:55:55	8:27:25	9:57:37	
09139	126	32	1787 Jun 30	14:39:32	Total	0.3440	1.1947	363.5	220.8	68.6	11:37:47	17:41:17	12:49:08	14:05:14	15:13:50	16:29:56	
09184	126	33	1805 Jul 11	21:04:52	Total	0.2561	1.3554	368.1	227.6	87.6	18:00:49	0:08:55	19:11:04	20:21:04	21:48:40	22:58:40	
09229	126	34	1823 Jul 23	3:32:23	Total	0.1699	1.5124	371.6	232.3	98.6	0:26:35	6:38:11	1:36:14	2:43:05	4:21:41	5:28:32	
09275	126	35	1841 Aug 02	10:00:51	Total	0.0846	1.6678	373.8	235.0	104.6	6:53:57	13:07:45	8:03:21	9:08:33	10:53:09	11:58:21	
09320	126	36	1859 Aug 13	16:34:26	Total	0.0038	1.8148	374.9	236.0	106.5	13:26:59	19:41:53	14:36:26	15:41:11	17:27:41	18:32:26	
09364	126	37	1877 Aug 23	23:11:35	Total	-0.0739	1.6849	375.0	235.4	104.9	20:04:05	2:19:05	21:13:53	22:19:08	0:04:02	1:09:17	
09408	126	38	1895 Sep 04	5:56:52	Total	-0.1449	1.5530	374.4	233.5	100.5	2:49:40	9:04:04	4:00:07	5:06:37	6:47:07	7:53:37	
09450	126	39	1913 Sep 15	12:48:19	Total	-0.2109	1.4304	373.0	230.5	93.5	9:41:49	15:54:49	10:53:04	12:01:34	13:35:04	14:43:34	
09492	126	40	1931 Sep 26	19:48:29	Total	-0.2698	1.3208	371.2	226.9	84.2	16:42:53	22:54:05	17:55:02	19:06:23	20:30:35	21:41:56	
09534	126	41	1949 Oct 07	2:56:55	Total	-0.3219	1.2236	369.2	222.9	72.8	23:52:19	6:01:31	1:05:28	2:20:31	3:33:19	4:48:22	
09575	126	42	1967 Oct 18	10:15:48	Total	-0.3653	1.1426	367.1	218.9	59.8	7:12:15	13:19:21	8:26:21	9:45:54	10:45:42	12:05:15	
09617	126	43	1985 Oct 28	17:43:17	Total	-0.4022	1.0736	365.1	214.9	43.9	14:40:44	20:45:50	15:55:50	17:21:20	18:05:14	19:30:44	
09658	126	44	2003 Nov 09	1:19:38	Total	-0.4319	1.0178	363.2	211.4	22.0	22:18:02	4:21:14	23:33:56	1:08:38	1:30:38	3:05:20	
09699	126	45	2021 Nov 19	9:04:06	Partial	-0.4552	0.9742	361.5	208.4		6:03:21	12:04:51	7:19:54			10:48:18	
09740	126	46	2039 Nov 30	16:56:28	Partial	-0.4721	0.9426	360.1	206.0		13:56:25	19:56:31	15:13:28			18:39:28	
09780	126	47	2057 Dec 11	0:53:38	Partial	-0.4853	0.9181	358.8	204.0		21:54:14	3:53:02	23:11:38			2:35:38	
09821	126	48	2075 Dec 22	8:55:55	Partial	-0.4945	0.9013	357.6	202.5		5:57:07	11:54:43	7:14:40			10:37:10	
09862	126	49	2094 Jan 01	17:00:06	Partial	-0.5024	0.8871	356.5	201.2		14:01:51	19:58:21	15:19:30			18:40:42	
09904	126	50	2112 Jan 14	1:06:36	Partial	-0.5087	0.8764	355.3	200.1		22:08:57	4:04:15	23:26:33			2:46:39	
09946	126	51	2130 Jan 24	9:10:19	Partial	-0.5173	0.8619	353.7	198.7		6:13:28	12:07:10	7:30:58			10:49:40	
09990	126	52	2148 Feb 04	17:13:45	Partial	-0.5265	0.8465	352.0	197.2		14:17:45	20:09:45	15:35:09			18:52:21	
10034	126	53	2166 Feb 15	1:11:40	Partial	-0.5402	0.8233	349.8	194.9		22:16:46	4:06:34	23:34:13			2:49:07	
10077	126	54	2184 Feb 26	9:05:35	Partial	-0.5579	0.7930	347.1	192.0		6:12:02	11:59:08	7:29:35			10:41:35	
10120	126	55	2202 Mar 09	16:51:36	Partial	-0.5824	0.7505	343.6	187.8		13:59:48	19:43:24	15:17:42			18:25:30	
10164	126	56	2220 Mar 20	0:32:40	Partial	-0.6114	0.6999	339.4	182.6		21:42:58	3:22:22	23:01:22			2:03:58	
10209	126	57	2238 Mar 31	8:05:25	Partial	-0.6477	0.6362	334.3	175.6		5:18:16	10:52:34	6:37:37			9:33:13	
10254	126	58	2256 Apr 10	15:31:04	Partial	-0.6904	0.5606	328.1	166.5		12:47:01	18:15:07	14:07:49			16:54:19	
10300	126	59	2274 Apr 21	22:48:59	Partial	-0.7401	0.4723	320.8	154.6		20:08:35	1:29:23	21:31:41			0:06:17	
10347	126	60	2292 May 2	6:00:52	Partial	-0.7956	0.3735	312.0	139.2		3:24:52	8:36:52	4:51:16			7:10:28	
10393	126	61	2310 May 14	13:06:26	Partial	-0.8566	0.2643	301.8	118.7		10:35:32	15:37:20	12:07:05			14:05:47	
10439	126	62	2328 May 24	20:06:39	Partial	-0.9225	0.1460	289.9	89.5		17:41:42	22:31:36	19:21:54			20:51:24	
10485	126	63	2346 Jun 05	3:03:17	Partial	-0.9921	0.0209	276.2	34.4		0:45:11	5:21:23	2:46:05			3:20:29	
10530	126	64	2364 Jun 15	9:57:15	Penumbral	-1.0645	-0.1097	260.4			7:47:03	12:07:27					
10575	126	65	2382 Jun 26	16:49:14	Penumbral	-1.1391	-0.2444	242.3			14:48:05	18:50:23					
10619	126	66	2400 Jul 06	23:41:22	Penumbral	-1.2140	-0.3798	221.8			21:50:28	1:32:16					
10664	126	67	2418 Jul 18	6:34:23	Penumbral	-1.2887	-0.5153	198.1			4:55:20	8:13:26					
10708	126	68	2436 Jul 28	13:31:07	Penumbral	-1.3610	-0.6466	171.1			12:05:34	14:56:40					
10752	126	69	2454 Aug 08	20:30:20	Penumbral	-1.4320	-0.7757	138.2			19:21:14	21:39:26					
10794	126	70	2472 Aug 19	3:36:26	Penumbral	-1.4981	-0.8961	96.8			2:48:02	4:24:50					

== See also ==
- List of lunar eclipses
  - List of Saros series for lunar eclipses
