= September 1931 lunar eclipse =

Total lunar eclipse of September 1931

- Total eclipse
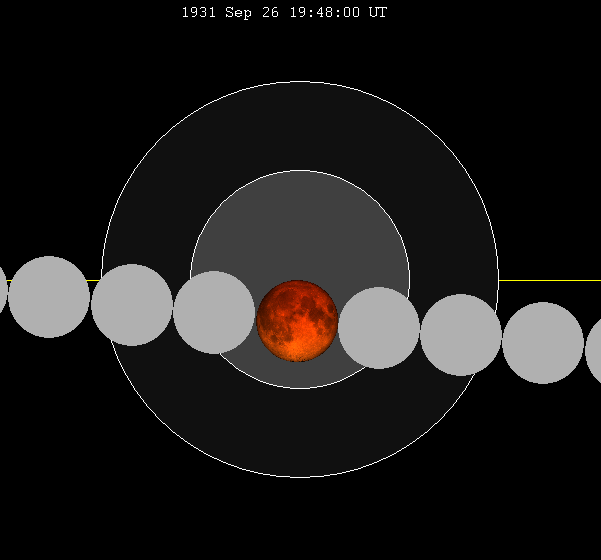
- The Moon's hourly motion shown right to left
- Date: September 26, 1931
- Gamma: −0.2698
- Magnitude: 1.3208
- Saros cycle: 126 (41 of 72)
- Totality: 84 minutes, 14 seconds
- Partiality: 226 minutes, 56 seconds
- Penumbral: 371 minutes, 15 seconds
Contacts (UTC)
- P1: 16:42:27
- U1: 17:54:37
- U2: 19:05:58
- Greatest: 19:48:05
- U3: 20:30:12
- U4: 21:41:32
- P4: 22:53:42

A total lunar eclipse occurred at the Moon’s ascending node of orbit on Saturday, September 26, 1931, with an umbral magnitude of 1.3208. It was a central lunar eclipse, in which part of the Moon passed through the center of the Earth's shadow. A lunar eclipse occurs when the Moon moves into the Earth's shadow, causing the Moon to be darkened. A total lunar eclipse occurs when the Moon's near side entirely passes into the Earth's umbral shadow. Unlike a solar eclipse, which can only be viewed from a relatively small area of the world, a lunar eclipse may be viewed from anywhere on the night side of Earth. A total lunar eclipse can last up to nearly two hours, while a total solar eclipse lasts only a few minutes at any given place, because the Moon's shadow is smaller. Occurring only about 8 hours before apogee (on September 27, 1931, at 3:40 UTC), the Moon's apparent diameter was smaller.

This was the last central lunar eclipse of Lunar Saros 126.

== Visibility ==
The eclipse was completely visible over east Africa, eastern Europe, and west, central, south, and southeast Asia, seen rising over west Africa, western Europe, South America, and northeastern North America and setting over east and northeast Asia and Australia.

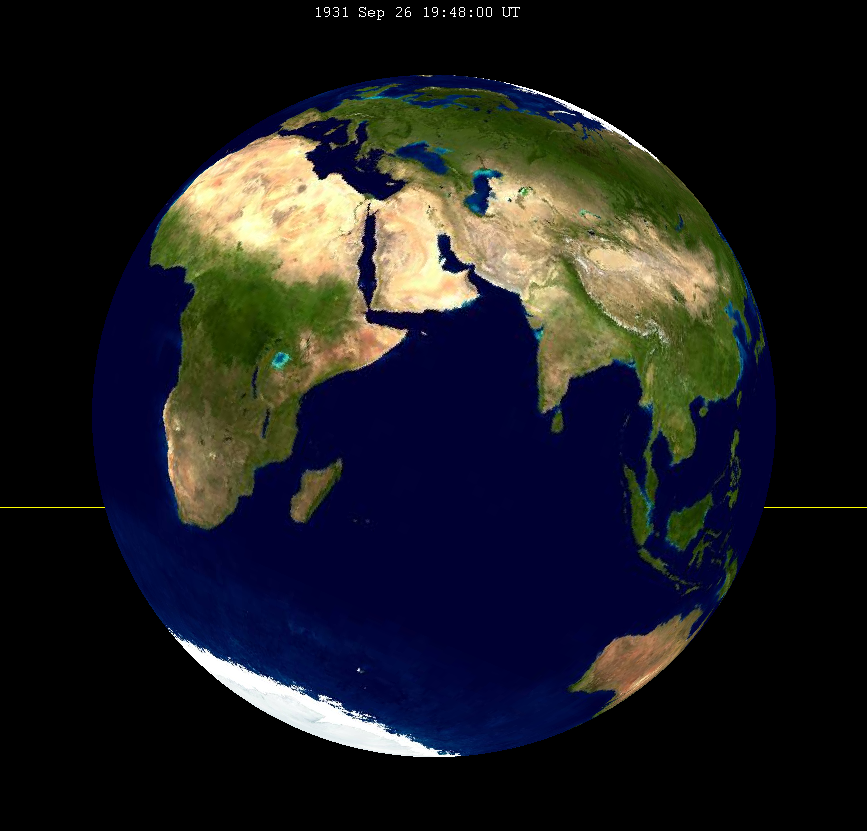
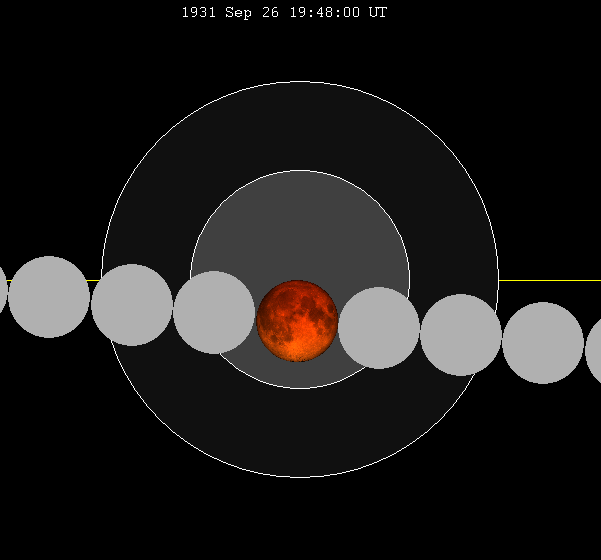

== Eclipse details ==
Shown below is a table displaying details about this particular solar eclipse. It describes various parameters pertaining to this eclipse.

September 26, 1931 Lunar Eclipse Parameters
| Parameter | Value |
|---|---|
| Penumbral Magnitude | 2.40586 |
| Umbral Magnitude | 1.32082 |
| Gamma | −0.26978 |
| Sun Right Ascension | 12h10m06.0s |
| Sun Declination | -01°05'41.6" |
| Sun Semi-Diameter | 15'57.4" |
| Sun Equatorial Horizontal Parallax | 08.8" |
| Moon Right Ascension | 00h10m34.4s |
| Moon Declination | +00°52'59.0" |
| Moon Semi-Diameter | 14'42.4" |
| Moon Equatorial Horizontal Parallax | 0°53'58.3" |
| ΔT | 24.0 s |

== Eclipse season ==
This eclipse is part of an eclipse season, a period, roughly every six months, when eclipses occur. Only two (or occasionally three) eclipse seasons occur each year, and each season lasts about 35 days and repeats just short of six months (173 days) later; thus two full eclipse seasons always occur each year. Either two or three eclipses happen each eclipse season. In the sequence below, each eclipse is separated by a fortnight. The first and last eclipse in this sequence is separated by one synodic month.

Eclipse season of September–October 1931
| September 12 Descending node (new moon) | September 26 Ascending node (full moon) | October 11 Descending node (new moon) |
|---|---|---|
| Partial solar eclipse Solar Saros 114 | Total lunar eclipse Lunar Saros 126 | Partial solar eclipse Solar Saros 152 |

== Related eclipses ==
=== Eclipses in 1931 ===
- A total lunar eclipse on April 2.
- A partial solar eclipse on April 18.
- A partial solar eclipse on September 12.
- A total lunar eclipse on September 26.
- A partial solar eclipse on October 11.

=== Metonic ===
- Preceded by: Lunar eclipse of December 8, 1927
- Followed by: Lunar eclipse of July 16, 1935

=== Tzolkinex ===
- Preceded by: Lunar eclipse of August 14, 1924
- Followed by: Lunar eclipse of November 7, 1938

=== Half-Saros ===
- Preceded by: Solar eclipse of September 21, 1922
- Followed by: Solar eclipse of October 1, 1940

=== Tritos ===
- Preceded by: Lunar eclipse of October 27, 1920
- Followed by: Lunar eclipse of August 26, 1942

=== Lunar Saros 126 ===
- Preceded by: Lunar eclipse of September 15, 1913
- Followed by: Lunar eclipse of October 7, 1949

=== Inex ===
- Preceded by: Lunar eclipse of October 17, 1902
- Followed by: Lunar eclipse of September 5, 1960

=== Triad ===
- Preceded by: Lunar eclipse of November 24, 1844
- Followed by: Lunar eclipse of July 27, 2018

=== Lunar eclipses of 1930–1933 ===
This eclipse is a member of a semester series. An eclipse in a semester series of lunar eclipses repeats approximately every 177 days and 4 hours (a semester) at alternating nodes of the Moon's orbit.

The penumbral lunar eclipses on February 10, 1933 and August 5, 1933 occur in the next lunar year eclipse set.

Lunar eclipse series sets from 1930 to 1933
| Descending node | | | | Ascending node | | | |
| Saros | Date Viewing | Type Chart | Gamma | Saros | Date Viewing | Type Chart | Gamma |
| 111 | 1930 Apr 13 | Partial | 0.9545 | 116 | 1930 Oct 07 | Partial | −0.9812 |
| 121 | 1931 Apr 02 | Total | 0.2043 | 126 | 1931 Sep 26 | Total | −0.2698 |
| 131 | 1932 Mar 22 | Partial | −0.4956 | 136 | 1932 Sep 14 | Partial | 0.4664 |
| 141 | 1933 Mar 12 | Penumbral | −1.2369 | 146 | 1933 Sep 04 | Penumbral | 1.1776 |

=== Saros 126 ===
This eclipse is a part of Saros series 126, repeating every 18 years, 11 days, and containing 70 events. The series started with a penumbral lunar eclipse on July 18, 1228. It contains partial eclipses from March 24, 1625 through June 9, 1751; total eclipses from June 19, 1769 through November 9, 2003; and a second set of partial eclipses from November 19, 2021 through June 5, 2346. The series ends at member 70 as a penumbral eclipse on August 19, 2472.

The longest duration of totality was produced by member 36 at 106 minutes, 27 seconds on August 13, 1859. All eclipses in this series occur at the Moon’s ascending node of orbit.

| Greatest | First | | | |
|---|---|---|---|---|
| The greatest eclipse of the series occurred on 1859 Aug 13, lasting 106 minutes, 27 seconds. | Penumbral | Partial | Total | Central |
| The greatest eclipse of the series occurred on 1859 Aug 13, lasting 106 minutes, 27 seconds. | 1228 Jul 18 | 1625 Mar 24 | 1769 Jun 19 | 1805 Jul 11 |
| The greatest eclipse of the series occurred on 1859 Aug 13, lasting 106 minutes, 27 seconds. | Last | | | |
| The greatest eclipse of the series occurred on 1859 Aug 13, lasting 106 minutes, 27 seconds. | Central | Total | Partial | Penumbral |
| The greatest eclipse of the series occurred on 1859 Aug 13, lasting 106 minutes, 27 seconds. | 1931 Sep 26 | 2003 Nov 09 | 2346 Jun 05 | 2472 Aug 19 |

Eclipses are tabulated in three columns; every third eclipse in the same column is one exeligmos apart, so they all cast shadows over approximately the same parts of the Earth.

Series members 33–54 occur between 1801 and 2200:
| 33 | 34 | 35 |
|---|---|---|
| 1805 Jul 11 | 1823 Jul 23 | 1841 Aug 02 |
| 36 | 37 | 38 |
| 1859 Aug 13 | 1877 Aug 23 | 1895 Sep 04 |
| 39 | 40 | 41 |
| 1913 Sep 15 | 1931 Sep 26 | 1949 Oct 07 |
| 42 | 43 | 44 |
| 1967 Oct 18 | 1985 Oct 28 | 2003 Nov 09 |
| 45 | 46 | 47 |
| 2021 Nov 19 | 2039 Nov 30 | 2057 Dec 11 |
| 48 | 49 | 50 |
| 2075 Dec 22 | 2094 Jan 01 | 2112 Jan 14 |
| 51 | 52 | 53 |
| 2130 Jan 24 | 2148 Feb 04 | 2166 Feb 15 |
54
2184 Feb 26

=== Tritos series ===
This eclipse is a part of a tritos cycle, repeating at alternating nodes every 135 synodic months (≈ 3986.63 days, or 11 years minus 1 month). Their appearance and longitude are irregular due to a lack of synchronization with the anomalistic month (period of perigee), but groupings of 3 tritos cycles (≈ 33 years minus 3 months) come close (≈ 434.044 anomalistic months), so eclipses are similar in these groupings.

Series members between 1801 and 2200
| 1811 Sep 02 (Saros 115) | 1822 Aug 03 (Saros 116) | 1833 Jul 02 (Saros 117) | 1844 May 31 (Saros 118) | 1855 May 02 (Saros 119) |
| 1866 Mar 31 (Saros 120) | 1877 Feb 27 (Saros 121) | 1888 Jan 28 (Saros 122) | 1898 Dec 27 (Saros 123) | 1909 Nov 27 (Saros 124) |
| 1920 Oct 27 (Saros 125) | 1931 Sep 26 (Saros 126) | 1942 Aug 26 (Saros 127) | 1953 Jul 26 (Saros 128) | 1964 Jun 25 (Saros 129) |
| 1975 May 25 (Saros 130) | 1986 Apr 24 (Saros 131) | 1997 Mar 24 (Saros 132) | 2008 Feb 21 (Saros 133) | 2019 Jan 21 (Saros 134) |
| 2029 Dec 20 (Saros 135) | 2040 Nov 18 (Saros 136) | 2051 Oct 19 (Saros 137) | 2062 Sep 18 (Saros 138) | 2073 Aug 17 (Saros 139) |
| 2084 Jul 17 (Saros 140) | 2095 Jun 17 (Saros 141) | 2106 May 17 (Saros 142) | 2117 Apr 16 (Saros 143) | 2128 Mar 16 (Saros 144) |
| 2139 Feb 13 (Saros 145) | 2150 Jan 13 (Saros 146) | 2160 Dec 13 (Saros 147) | 2171 Nov 12 (Saros 148) | 2182 Oct 11 (Saros 149) |
2193 Sep 11 (Saros 150)

=== Inex series ===
This eclipse is a part of the long period inex cycle, repeating at alternating nodes, every 358 synodic months (≈ 10,571.95 days, or 29 years minus 20 days). Their appearance and longitude are irregular due to a lack of synchronization with the anomalistic month (period of perigee). However, groupings of 3 inex cycles (≈ 87 years minus 2 months) comes close (≈ 1,151.02 anomalistic months), so eclipses are similar in these groupings.

Series members between 1801 and 2200
| 1815 Dec 16 (Saros 122) | 1844 Nov 24 (Saros 123) | 1873 Nov 04 (Saros 124) |
| 1902 Oct 17 (Saros 125) | 1931 Sep 26 (Saros 126) | 1960 Sep 05 (Saros 127) |
| 1989 Aug 17 (Saros 128) | 2018 Jul 27 (Saros 129) | 2047 Jul 07 (Saros 130) |
| 2076 Jun 17 (Saros 131) | 2105 May 28 (Saros 132) | 2134 May 08 (Saros 133) |
| 2163 Apr 19 (Saros 134) | 2192 Mar 28 (Saros 135) | |

=== Half-Saros cycle ===
A lunar eclipse will be preceded and followed by solar eclipses by 9 years and 5.5 days (a half saros). This lunar eclipse is related to two total solar eclipses of Solar Saros 133.

| September 21, 1922 | October 1, 1940 |

== See also ==
- List of lunar eclipses and List of 21st-century lunar eclipses
