= May 1975 lunar eclipse =

Total lunar eclipse

- Total eclipse
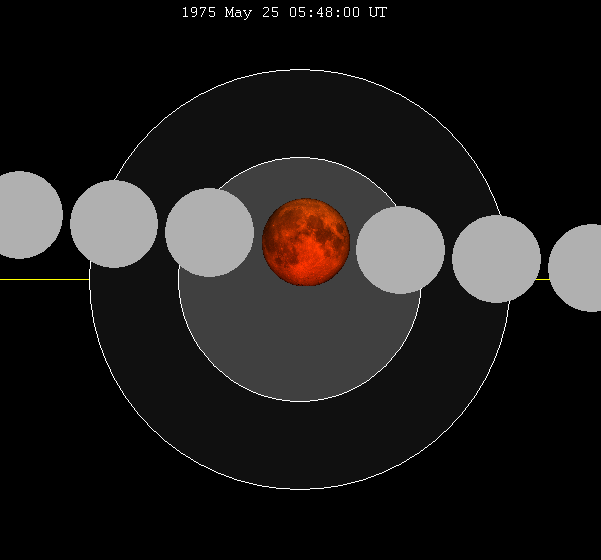
- The Moon's hourly motion shown right to left
- Date: May 25, 1975
- Gamma: 0.2367
- Magnitude: 1.4253
- Saros cycle: 130 (32 of 72)
- Totality: 88 minutes, 18 seconds
- Partiality: 215 minutes, 11 seconds
- Penumbral: 335 minutes, 54 seconds
Contacts (UTC)
- P1: 3:00:07
- U1: 4:00:24
- U2: 5:03:51
- Greatest: 5:48:01
- U3: 6:32:09
- U4: 7:35:35
- P4: 8:36:00

A total lunar eclipse occurred at the Moon’s ascending node of orbit on Sunday, May 25, 1975, with an umbral magnitude of 1.4253. It was a central lunar eclipse, in which part of the Moon passed through the center of the Earth's shadow. A lunar eclipse occurs when the Moon moves into the Earth's shadow, causing the Moon to be darkened. A total lunar eclipse occurs when the Moon's near side entirely passes into the Earth's umbral shadow. Unlike a solar eclipse, which can only be viewed from a relatively small area of the world, a lunar eclipse may be viewed from anywhere on the night side of Earth. A total lunar eclipse can last up to nearly two hours, while a total solar eclipse lasts only a few minutes at any given place, because the Moon's shadow is smaller. Occurring about 4.4 days after perigee (on May 20, 1975, at 20:50 UTC), the Moon's apparent diameter was larger.

This was the first central lunar eclipse of Lunar Saros 130.

== Visibility ==
The eclipse was completely visible over much of North America, South America, and Antarctica, seen rising over eastern Australia, northwestern North America, and the central Pacific Ocean and setting over western Europe and Africa.

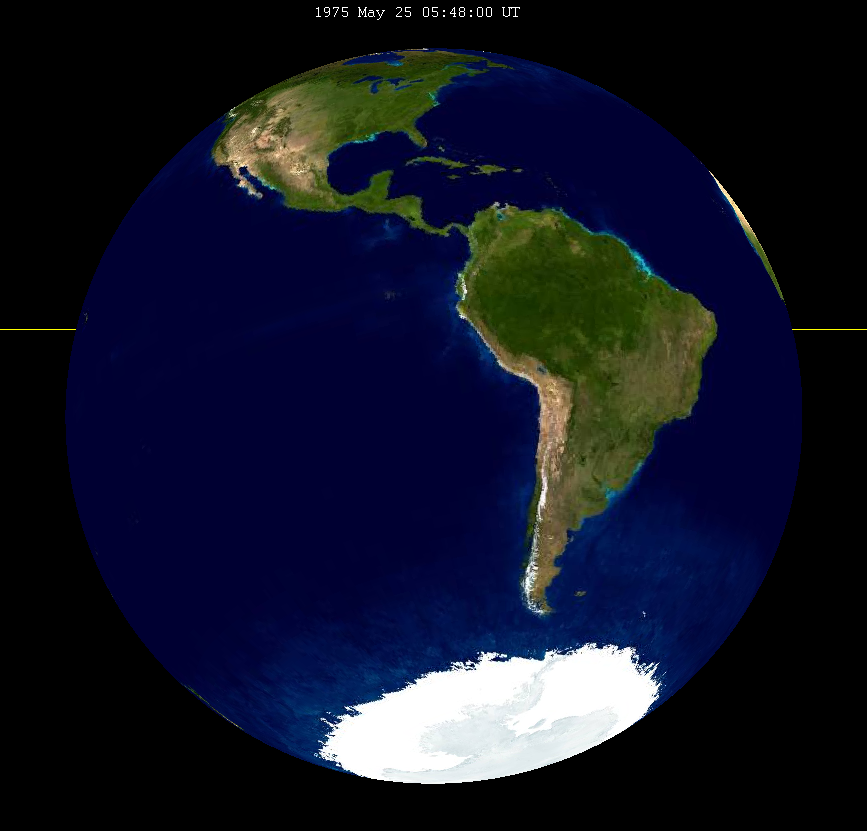
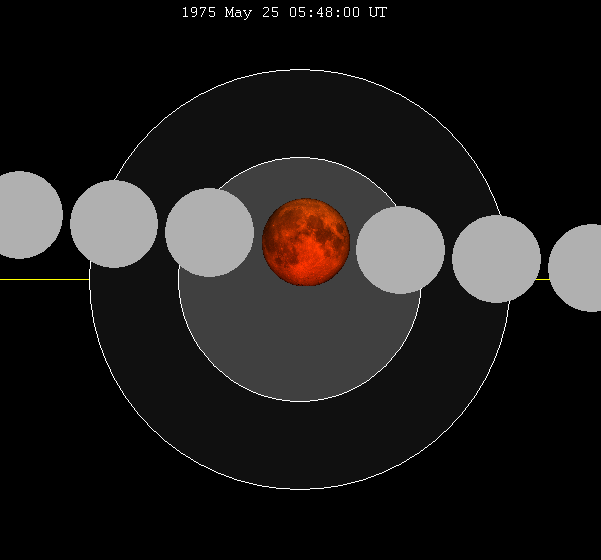

== Eclipse details ==
Shown below is a table displaying details about this particular solar eclipse. It describes various parameters pertaining to this eclipse.

May 25, 1975 Lunar Eclipse Parameters
Parameter	Value
Penumbral Magnitude	2.42179
Umbral Magnitude	1.42533
Gamma	0.23674
Sun Right Ascension	04h05m34.7s
Sun Declination	+20°50'24.7"
Sun Semi-Diameter	15'47.5"
Sun Equatorial Horizontal Parallax	08.7"
Moon Right Ascension	16h05m40.2s
Moon Declination	-20°36'42.2"
Moon Semi-Diameter	15'50.9"
Moon Equatorial Horizontal Parallax	0°58'09.7"
ΔT	45.9 s

== Eclipse season ==
This eclipse is part of an eclipse season, a period, roughly every six months, when eclipses occur. Only two (or occasionally three) eclipse seasons occur each year, and each season lasts about 35 days and repeats just short of six months (173 days) later; thus two full eclipse seasons always occur each year. Either two or three eclipses happen each eclipse season. In the sequence below, each eclipse is separated by a fortnight.

Eclipse season of May 1975
May 11 Descending node (new moon)	May 25 Ascending node (full moon)
Partial solar eclipse Solar Saros 118	Total lunar eclipse Lunar Saros 130

== Related eclipses ==
=== Eclipses in 1975 ===
- A partial solar eclipse on May 11.
- A total lunar eclipse on May 25.
- A partial solar eclipse on November 3.
- A total lunar eclipse on November 18.

=== Metonic ===
- Preceded by: Lunar eclipse of August 6, 1971
- Followed by: Lunar eclipse of March 13, 1979

=== Tzolkinex ===
- Preceded by: Lunar eclipse of April 13, 1968
- Followed by: Lunar eclipse of July 6, 1982

=== Half-Saros ===
- Preceded by: Solar eclipse of May 20, 1966
- Followed by: Solar eclipse of May 30, 1984

=== Tritos ===
- Preceded by: Lunar eclipse of June 25, 1964
- Followed by: Lunar eclipse of April 24, 1986

=== Lunar Saros 130 ===
- Preceded by: Lunar eclipse of May 13, 1957
- Followed by: Lunar eclipse of June 4, 1993

=== Inex ===
- Preceded by: Lunar eclipse of June 14, 1946
- Followed by: Lunar eclipse of May 4, 2004

=== Triad ===
- Preceded by: Lunar eclipse of July 23, 1888
- Followed by: Lunar eclipse of March 25, 2062

=== Lunar eclipses of 1973–1976 ===
This eclipse is a member of a semester series. An eclipse in a semester series of lunar eclipses repeats approximately every 177 days and 4 hours (a semester) at alternating nodes of the Moon's orbit.

The penumbral lunar eclipses on January 18, 1973 and July 15, 1973 occur in the previous lunar year eclipse set.

Lunar eclipse series sets from 1973 to 1976
Ascending node				Descending node			
Saros	Date Viewing	Type Chart	Gamma	Saros	Date Viewing	Type Chart	Gamma
110	1973 Jun 15	Penumbral	−1.3217	115	1973 Dec 10	Partial	0.9644
120	1974 Jun 04	Partial	−0.5489	125	1974 Nov 29	Total	0.3054
130	1975 May 25	Total	0.2367	135	1975 Nov 18	Total	−0.4134
140	1976 May 13	Partial	0.9586	145	1976 Nov 06	Penumbral	−1.1276

=== Saros 130 ===
This eclipse is a part of Saros series 130, repeating every 18 years, 11 days, and containing 71 events. The series started with a penumbral lunar eclipse on June 10, 1416. It contains partial eclipses from September 4, 1560 through April 12, 1903; total eclipses from April 22, 1921 through September 11, 2155; and a second set of partial eclipses from September 21, 2173 through May 10, 2552. The series ends at member 71 as a penumbral eclipse on July 26, 2678.

The longest duration of totality will be produced by member 35 at 101 minutes, 53 seconds on June 26, 2029. All eclipses in this series occur at the Moon’s ascending node of orbit.

Greatest	First			
The greatest eclipse of the series will occur on 2029 Jun 26, lasting 101 minutes, 53 seconds.	Penumbral	Partial	Total	Central
The greatest eclipse of the series will occur on 2029 Jun 26, lasting 101 minutes, 53 seconds.	1416 Jun 10	1560 Sep 04	1921 Apr 22	1975 May 25
The greatest eclipse of the series will occur on 2029 Jun 26, lasting 101 minutes, 53 seconds.	Last			
The greatest eclipse of the series will occur on 2029 Jun 26, lasting 101 minutes, 53 seconds.	Central	Total	Partial	Penumbral
The greatest eclipse of the series will occur on 2029 Jun 26, lasting 101 minutes, 53 seconds.	2083 Jul 29	2155 Sep 11	2552 May 10	2678 Jul 26

Eclipses are tabulated in three columns; every third eclipse in the same column is one exeligmos apart, so they all cast shadows over approximately the same parts of the Earth.

Series members 23–44 occur between 1801 and 2200:
23	24	25
1813 Feb 15	1831 Feb 26	1849 Mar 09
26	27	28
1867 Mar 20	1885 Mar 30	1903 Apr 12
29	30	31
1921 Apr 22	1939 May 03	1957 May 13
32	33	34
1975 May 25	1993 Jun 04	2011 Jun 15
35	36	37
2029 Jun 26	2047 Jul 07	2065 Jul 17
38	39	40
2083 Jul 29	2101 Aug 09	2119 Aug 20
41	42	43
2137 Aug 30	2155 Sep 11	2173 Sep 21
44
2191 Oct 02

=== Tritos series ===
This eclipse is a part of a tritos cycle, repeating at alternating nodes every 135 synodic months (≈ 3986.63 days, or 11 years minus 1 month). Their appearance and longitude are irregular due to a lack of synchronization with the anomalistic month (period of perigee), but groupings of 3 tritos cycles (≈ 33 years minus 3 months) come close (≈ 434.044 anomalistic months), so eclipses are similar in these groupings.

Series members between 1801 and 2200
1811 Sep 02 (Saros 115)	1822 Aug 03 (Saros 116)	1833 Jul 02 (Saros 117)	1844 May 31 (Saros 118)	1855 May 02 (Saros 119)
1866 Mar 31 (Saros 120)	1877 Feb 27 (Saros 121)	1888 Jan 28 (Saros 122)	1898 Dec 27 (Saros 123)	1909 Nov 27 (Saros 124)
1920 Oct 27 (Saros 125)	1931 Sep 26 (Saros 126)	1942 Aug 26 (Saros 127)	1953 Jul 26 (Saros 128)	1964 Jun 25 (Saros 129)
1975 May 25 (Saros 130)	1986 Apr 24 (Saros 131)	1997 Mar 24 (Saros 132)	2008 Feb 21 (Saros 133)	2019 Jan 21 (Saros 134)
2029 Dec 20 (Saros 135)	2040 Nov 18 (Saros 136)	2051 Oct 19 (Saros 137)	2062 Sep 18 (Saros 138)	2073 Aug 17 (Saros 139)
2084 Jul 17 (Saros 140)	2095 Jun 17 (Saros 141)	2106 May 17 (Saros 142)	2117 Apr 16 (Saros 143)	2128 Mar 16 (Saros 144)
2139 Feb 13 (Saros 145)	2150 Jan 13 (Saros 146)	2160 Dec 13 (Saros 147)	2171 Nov 12 (Saros 148)	2182 Oct 11 (Saros 149)
2193 Sep 11 (Saros 150)

=== Inex series ===
This eclipse is a part of the long period inex cycle, repeating at alternating nodes, every 358 synodic months (≈ 10,571.95 days, or 29 years minus 20 days). Their appearance and longitude are irregular due to a lack of synchronization with the anomalistic month (period of perigee). However, groupings of 3 inex cycles (≈ 87 years minus 2 months) comes close (≈ 1,151.02 anomalistic months), so eclipses are similar in these groupings.

Series members between 1801 and 2200
1801 Sep 22 (Saros 124)	1830 Sep 02 (Saros 125)	1859 Aug 13 (Saros 126)
1888 Jul 23 (Saros 127)	1917 Jul 04 (Saros 128)	1946 Jun 14 (Saros 129)
1975 May 25 (Saros 130)	2004 May 04 (Saros 131)	2033 Apr 14 (Saros 132)
2062 Mar 25 (Saros 133)	2091 Mar 05 (Saros 134)	2120 Feb 14 (Saros 135)
2149 Jan 23 (Saros 136)	2178 Jan 04 (Saros 137)	

=== Half-Saros cycle ===
A lunar eclipse will be preceded and followed by solar eclipses by 9 years and 5.5 days (a half saros). This lunar eclipse is related to two annular solar eclipses of Solar Saros 137.

May 20, 1966	May 30, 1984

== See also ==
- Lists of lunar eclipses
- List of 20th-century lunar eclipses
