= April 1921 lunar eclipse =

Partial lunar eclipse in 1921

- Total eclipse
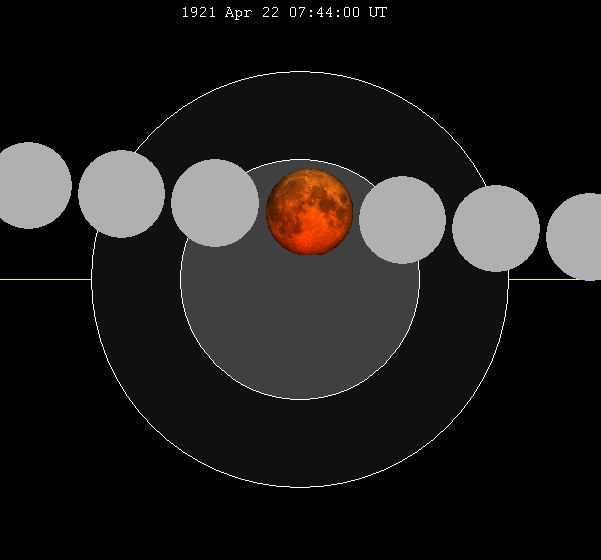
- The Moon's hourly motion shown right to left
- Date: April 22, 1921
- Gamma: 0.4269
- Magnitude: 1.0678
- Saros cycle: 130 (29 of 72)
- Totality: 40 minutes, 7 seconds
- Partiality: 202 minutes, 2 seconds
- Penumbral: 331 minutes, 54 seconds
Contacts (UTC)
- P1: 4:58:21
- U1: 6:03:14
- U2: 7:24:12
- Greatest: 7:44:17
- U3: 8:04:19
- U4: 9:25:16
- P4: 10:30:16

A total lunar eclipse occurred at the Moon’s ascending node of orbit on Friday, April 22, 1921, with an umbral magnitude of 1.0678. A lunar eclipse occurs when the Moon moves into the Earth's shadow, causing the Moon to be darkened. A total lunar eclipse occurs when the Moon's near side entirely passes into the Earth's umbral shadow. Unlike a solar eclipse, which can only be viewed from a relatively small area of the world, a lunar eclipse may be viewed from anywhere on the night side of Earth. A total lunar eclipse can last up to nearly two hours, while a total solar eclipse lasts only a few minutes at any given place, because the Moon's shadow is smaller. Occurring only about 5.6 days after perigee (on April 16, 1921, at 16:10 UTC), the Moon's apparent diameter was larger.

This lunar eclipse was the third of an almost tetrad, with the others being on May 3, 1920 (total); October 27, 1920 (total); and October 16, 1921 (partial).

This was the first total lunar eclipse of Lunar Saros 130.

== Visibility ==
The eclipse was completely visible over much of North America and western South America, seen rising over northeast Asia and Australia and setting over eastern South America, western Europe, and west Africa.

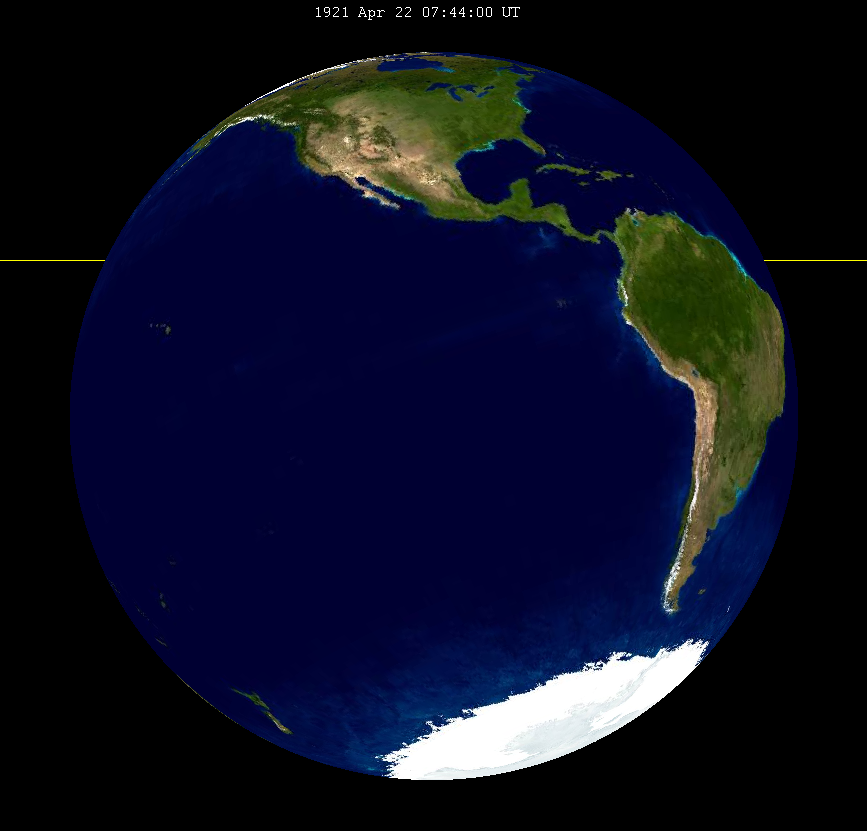
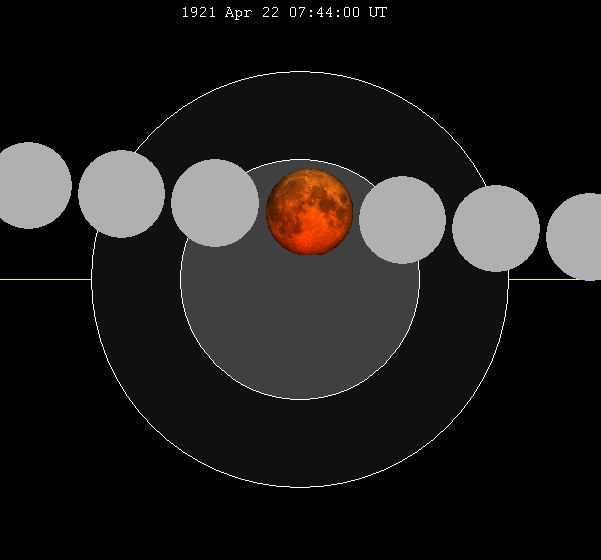

== Eclipse details ==
Shown below is a table displaying details about this particular solar eclipse. It describes various parameters pertaining to this eclipse.

April 22, 1921 Lunar Eclipse Parameters
Parameter	Value
Penumbral Magnitude	2.08154
Umbral Magnitude	1.06782
Gamma	0.42693
Sun Right Ascension	01h57m53.3s
Sun Declination	+12°02'44.0"
Sun Semi-Diameter	15'54.4"
Sun Equatorial Horizontal Parallax	08.7"
Moon Right Ascension	13h58m18.6s
Moon Declination	-11°38'56.5"
Moon Semi-Diameter	15'41.5"
Moon Equatorial Horizontal Parallax	0°57'35.3"
ΔT	22.2 s

== Eclipse season ==
This eclipse is part of an eclipse season, a period, roughly every six months, when eclipses occur. Only two (or occasionally three) eclipse seasons occur each year, and each season lasts about 35 days and repeats just short of six months (173 days) later; thus two full eclipse seasons always occur each year. Either two or three eclipses happen each eclipse season. In the sequence below, each eclipse is separated by a fortnight.

Eclipse season of April 1921
April 8 Descending node (new moon)	April 22 Ascending node (full moon)
Annular solar eclipse Solar Saros 118	Total lunar eclipse Lunar Saros 130

== Related eclipses ==
=== Eclipses in 1921 ===
- An annular solar eclipse on April 8.
- A total lunar eclipse on April 22.
- A total solar eclipse on October 1.
- A partial lunar eclipse on October 16.

=== Metonic ===
- Preceded by: Lunar eclipse of July 4, 1917
- Followed by: Lunar eclipse of February 8, 1925

=== Tzolkinex ===
- Preceded by: Lunar eclipse of March 12, 1914
- Followed by: Lunar eclipse of June 3, 1928

=== Half-Saros ===
- Preceded by: Solar eclipse of April 17, 1912
- Followed by: Solar eclipse of April 28, 1930

=== Tritos ===
- Preceded by: Lunar eclipse of May 24, 1910
- Followed by: Lunar eclipse of March 22, 1932

=== Lunar Saros 130 ===
- Preceded by: Lunar eclipse of April 12, 1903
- Followed by: Lunar eclipse of May 3, 1939

=== Inex ===
- Preceded by: Lunar eclipse of May 11, 1892
- Followed by: Lunar eclipse of April 2, 1950

=== Triad ===
- Preceded by: Lunar eclipse of June 21, 1834
- Followed by: Lunar eclipse of February 21, 2008

=== Lunar eclipses of 1919–1922 ===
This eclipse is a member of a semester series. An eclipse in a semester series of lunar eclipses repeats approximately every 177 days and 4 hours (a semester) at alternating nodes of the Moon's orbit.

The penumbral lunar eclipse on March 13, 1922 occurs in the next lunar year eclipse set.

Lunar eclipse series sets from 1919 to 1922
Ascending node				Descending node			
Saros	Date Viewing	Type Chart	Gamma	Saros	Date Viewing	Type Chart	Gamma
110	1919 May 15	Penumbral	−1.0820	115	1919 Nov 07	Partial	0.9246
120	1920 May 03	Total	−0.3312	125	1920 Oct 27	Total	0.2502
130	1921 Apr 22	Total	0.4269	135	1921 Oct 16	Partial	−0.4902
140	1922 Apr 11	Penumbral	1.1228	145	1922 Oct 06	Penumbral	−1.2348

=== Saros 130 ===
This eclipse is a part of Saros series 130, repeating every 18 years, 11 days, and containing 71 events. The series started with a penumbral lunar eclipse on June 10, 1416. It contains partial eclipses from September 4, 1560 through April 12, 1903; total eclipses from April 22, 1921 through September 11, 2155; and a second set of partial eclipses from September 21, 2173 through May 10, 2552. The series ends at member 71 as a penumbral eclipse on July 26, 2678.

The longest duration of totality will be produced by member 35 at 101 minutes, 53 seconds on June 26, 2029. All eclipses in this series occur at the Moon’s ascending node of orbit.

Greatest	First			
The greatest eclipse of the series will occur on 2029 Jun 26, lasting 101 minutes, 53 seconds.	Penumbral	Partial	Total	Central
The greatest eclipse of the series will occur on 2029 Jun 26, lasting 101 minutes, 53 seconds.	1416 Jun 10	1560 Sep 04	1921 Apr 22	1975 May 25
The greatest eclipse of the series will occur on 2029 Jun 26, lasting 101 minutes, 53 seconds.	Last			
The greatest eclipse of the series will occur on 2029 Jun 26, lasting 101 minutes, 53 seconds.	Central	Total	Partial	Penumbral
The greatest eclipse of the series will occur on 2029 Jun 26, lasting 101 minutes, 53 seconds.	2083 Jul 29	2155 Sep 11	2552 May 10	2678 Jul 26

Eclipses are tabulated in three columns; every third eclipse in the same column is one exeligmos apart, so they all cast shadows over approximately the same parts of the Earth.

Series members 23–44 occur between 1801 and 2200:
23	24	25
1813 Feb 15	1831 Feb 26	1849 Mar 09
26	27	28
1867 Mar 20	1885 Mar 30	1903 Apr 12
29	30	31
1921 Apr 22	1939 May 03	1957 May 13
32	33	34
1975 May 25	1993 Jun 04	2011 Jun 15
35	36	37
2029 Jun 26	2047 Jul 07	2065 Jul 17
38	39	40
2083 Jul 29	2101 Aug 09	2119 Aug 20
41	42	43
2137 Aug 30	2155 Sep 11	2173 Sep 21
44
2191 Oct 02

=== Tritos series ===
This eclipse is a part of a tritos cycle, repeating at alternating nodes every 135 synodic months (≈ 3986.63 days, or 11 years minus 1 month). Their appearance and longitude are irregular due to a lack of synchronization with the anomalistic month (period of perigee), but groupings of 3 tritos cycles (≈ 33 years minus 3 months) come close (≈ 434.044 anomalistic months), so eclipses are similar in these groupings.

Series members between 1801 and 2200
1801 Mar 30 (Saros 119)	1812 Feb 27 (Saros 120)	1823 Jan 26 (Saros 121)	1833 Dec 26 (Saros 122)	1844 Nov 24 (Saros 123)
1855 Oct 25 (Saros 124)	1866 Sep 24 (Saros 125)	1877 Aug 23 (Saros 126)	1888 Jul 23 (Saros 127)	1899 Jun 23 (Saros 128)
1910 May 24 (Saros 129)	1921 Apr 22 (Saros 130)	1932 Mar 22 (Saros 131)	1943 Feb 20 (Saros 132)	1954 Jan 19 (Saros 133)
1964 Dec 19 (Saros 134)	1975 Nov 18 (Saros 135)	1986 Oct 17 (Saros 136)	1997 Sep 16 (Saros 137)	2008 Aug 16 (Saros 138)
2019 Jul 16 (Saros 139)	2030 Jun 15 (Saros 140)	2041 May 16 (Saros 141)	2052 Apr 14 (Saros 142)	2063 Mar 14 (Saros 143)
2074 Feb 11 (Saros 144)	2085 Jan 10 (Saros 145)	2095 Dec 11 (Saros 146)	2106 Nov 11 (Saros 147)	2117 Oct 10 (Saros 148)
2128 Sep 09 (Saros 149)	2139 Aug 10 (Saros 150)	2150 Jul 09 (Saros 151)	2161 Jun 08 (Saros 152)	2172 May 08 (Saros 153)
	2194 Mar 07 (Saros 155)			

=== Inex series ===
This eclipse is a part of the long period inex cycle, repeating at alternating nodes, every 358 synodic months (≈ 10,571.95 days, or 29 years minus 20 days). Their appearance and longitude are irregular due to a lack of synchronization with the anomalistic month (period of perigee). However, groupings of 3 inex cycles (≈ 87 years minus 2 months) comes close (≈ 1,151.02 anomalistic months), so eclipses are similar in these groupings.

Series members between 1801 and 2200
1805 Jul 11 (Saros 126)	1834 Jun 21 (Saros 127)	1863 Jun 01 (Saros 128)
1892 May 11 (Saros 129)	1921 Apr 22 (Saros 130)	1950 Apr 02 (Saros 131)
1979 Mar 13 (Saros 132)	2008 Feb 21 (Saros 133)	2037 Jan 31 (Saros 134)
2066 Jan 11 (Saros 135)	2094 Dec 21 (Saros 136)	2123 Dec 03 (Saros 137)
2152 Nov 12 (Saros 138)	2181 Oct 22 (Saros 139)	

=== Half-Saros cycle ===
A lunar eclipse will be preceded and followed by solar eclipses by 9 years and 5.5 days (a half saros). This lunar eclipse is related to two annular solar eclipses of Solar Saros 137.

April 17, 1912	April 28, 1930

== See also ==
- List of lunar eclipses
- List of 20th-century lunar eclipses
