= May 1939 lunar eclipse =

Total lunar eclipse May 3, 1939

- Total eclipse
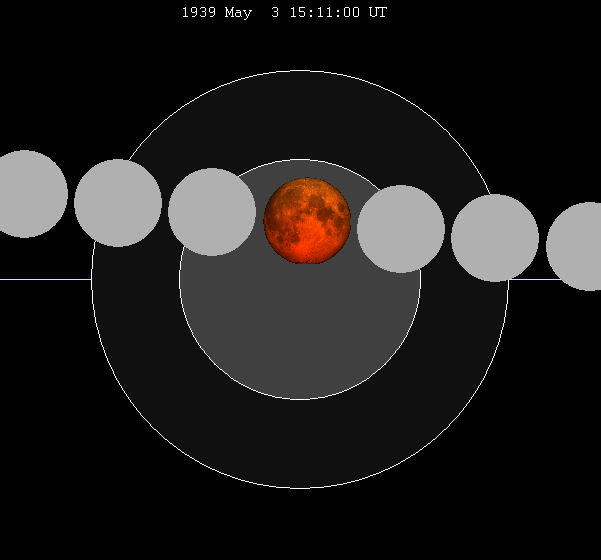
- The Moon's hourly motion shown right to left
- Date: May 3, 1939
- Gamma: 0.3693
- Magnitude: 1.1765
- Saros cycle: 130 (30 of 72)
- Totality: 62 minutes, 23 seconds
- Partiality: 207 minutes, 3 seconds
- Penumbral: 333 minutes, 31 seconds
Contacts (UTC)
- P1: 12:24:35
- U1: 13:27:45
- U2: 14:40:06
- Greatest: 15:11:18
- U3: 15:42:28
- U4: 16:54:48
- P4: 17:58:06

A total lunar eclipse occurred at the Moon's ascending node of orbit on Wednesday, May 3, 1939, with an umbral magnitude of 1.1765. A lunar eclipse occurs when the Moon moves into the Earth's shadow, causing the Moon to be darkened. A total lunar eclipse occurs when the Moon's near side entirely passes into the Earth's umbral shadow. Unlike a solar eclipse, which can only be viewed from a relatively small area of the world, a lunar eclipse may be viewed from anywhere on the night side of Earth. A total lunar eclipse can last up to nearly two hours, while a total solar eclipse lasts only a few minutes at any given place, because the Moon's shadow is smaller. Occurring about 5.2 days after perigee (on April 28, 1939, at 11:05 UTC), the Moon's apparent diameter was larger.

This lunar eclipse was the third of an almost tetrad, with the others being on May 14, 1938 (total); November 7, 1938 (total); and October 28, 1939 (partial).

== Visibility ==
The eclipse was completely visible over east Asia, Australia, and Antarctica, seen rising over central and east Africa, eastern Europe, and west, central, and south Asia and setting over western North America and the eastern Pacific Ocean.

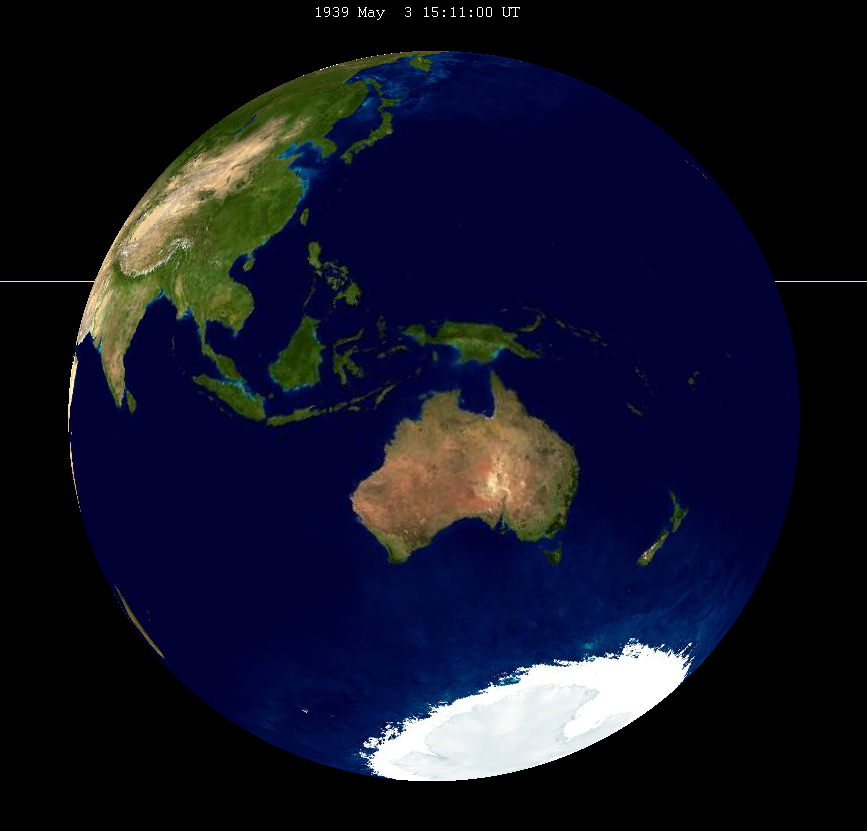
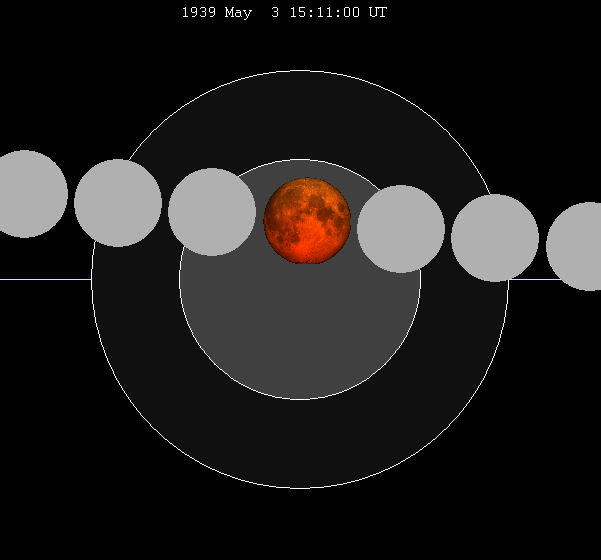

== Eclipse details ==
Shown below is a table displaying details about this particular solar eclipse. It describes various parameters pertaining to this eclipse.

May 3, 1939 Lunar Eclipse Parameters
Parameter	Value
Penumbral Magnitude	2.18417
Umbral Magnitude	1.17649
Gamma	0.36934
Sun Right Ascension	02h39m22.9s
Sun Declination	+15°31'43.2"
Sun Semi-Diameter	15'51.8"
Sun Equatorial Horizontal Parallax	08.7"
Moon Right Ascension	14h39m41.4s
Moon Declination	-15°10'51.4"
Moon Semi-Diameter	15'44.6"
Moon Equatorial Horizontal Parallax	0°57'46.6"
ΔT	24.2 s

== Eclipse season ==
This eclipse is part of an eclipse season, a period, roughly every six months, when eclipses occur. Only two (or occasionally three) eclipse seasons occur each year, and each season lasts about 35 days and repeats just short of six months (173 days) later; thus two full eclipse seasons always occur each year. Either two or three eclipses happen each eclipse season. In the sequence below, each eclipse is separated by a fortnight.

Eclipse season of April–May 1939
April 19 Descending node (new moon)	May 3 Ascending node (full moon)
Annular solar eclipse Solar Saros 118	Total lunar eclipse Lunar Saros 130

== Related eclipses ==
=== Eclipses in 1939 ===
- An annular solar eclipse on April 19.
- A total lunar eclipse on May 3.
- A total solar eclipse on October 12.
- A partial lunar eclipse on October 28.

=== Metonic ===
- Preceded by: Lunar eclipse of July 16, 1935
- Followed by: Lunar eclipse of February 20, 1943

=== Tzolkinex ===
- Preceded by: Lunar eclipse of March 22, 1932
- Followed by: Lunar eclipse of June 14, 1946

=== Half-Saros ===
- Preceded by: Solar eclipse of April 28, 1930
- Followed by: Solar eclipse of May 9, 1948

=== Tritos ===
- Preceded by: Lunar eclipse of June 3, 1928
- Followed by: Lunar eclipse of April 2, 1950

=== Lunar Saros 130 ===
- Preceded by: Lunar eclipse of April 22, 1921
- Followed by: Lunar eclipse of May 13, 1957

=== Inex ===
- Preceded by: Lunar eclipse of May 24, 1910
- Followed by: Lunar eclipse of April 13, 1968

=== Triad ===
- Preceded by: Lunar eclipse of July 1, 1852
- Followed by: Lunar eclipse of March 3, 2026

=== Lunar eclipses of 1937–1940 ===
This eclipse is a member of a semester series. An eclipse in a semester series of lunar eclipses repeats approximately every 177 days and 4 hours (a semester) at alternating nodes of the Moon's orbit.

The penumbral lunar eclipse on March 23, 1940 occurs in the next lunar year eclipse set.

Lunar eclipse series sets from 1937 to 1940
Ascending node				Descending node			
Saros	Date Viewing	Type Chart	Gamma	Saros	Date Viewing	Type Chart	Gamma
110	1937 May 25	Penumbral	−1.1582	115	1937 Nov 18	Partial	0.9421
120	1938 May 14	Total	−0.3994	125	1938 Nov 07	Total	0.2739
130	1939 May 03	Total	0.3693	135	1939 Oct 28	Partial	−0.4581
140	1940 Apr 22	Penumbral	1.0741	145	1940 Oct 16	Penumbral	−1.1925

=== Saros 130 ===
This eclipse is a part of Saros series 130, repeating every 18 years, 11 days, and containing 71 events. The series started with a penumbral lunar eclipse on June 10, 1416. It contains partial eclipses from September 4, 1560 through April 12, 1903; total eclipses from April 22, 1921 through September 11, 2155; and a second set of partial eclipses from September 21, 2173 through May 10, 2552. The series ends at member 71 as a penumbral eclipse on July 26, 2678.

The longest duration of totality will be produced by member 35 at 101 minutes, 53 seconds on June 26, 2029. All eclipses in this series occur at the Moon’s ascending node of orbit.

Greatest	First			
The greatest eclipse of the series will occur on 2029 Jun 26, lasting 101 minutes, 53 seconds.	Penumbral	Partial	Total	Central
The greatest eclipse of the series will occur on 2029 Jun 26, lasting 101 minutes, 53 seconds.	1416 Jun 10	1560 Sep 04	1921 Apr 22	1975 May 25
The greatest eclipse of the series will occur on 2029 Jun 26, lasting 101 minutes, 53 seconds.	Last			
The greatest eclipse of the series will occur on 2029 Jun 26, lasting 101 minutes, 53 seconds.	Central	Total	Partial	Penumbral
The greatest eclipse of the series will occur on 2029 Jun 26, lasting 101 minutes, 53 seconds.	2083 Jul 29	2155 Sep 11	2552 May 10	2678 Jul 26

Eclipses are tabulated in three columns; every third eclipse in the same column is one exeligmos apart, so they all cast shadows over approximately the same parts of the Earth.

Series members 23–44 occur between 1801 and 2200:
23	24	25
1813 Feb 15	1831 Feb 26	1849 Mar 09
26	27	28
1867 Mar 20	1885 Mar 30	1903 Apr 12
29	30	31
1921 Apr 22	1939 May 03	1957 May 13
32	33	34
1975 May 25	1993 Jun 04	2011 Jun 15
35	36	37
2029 Jun 26	2047 Jul 07	2065 Jul 17
38	39	40
2083 Jul 29	2101 Aug 09	2119 Aug 20
41	42	43
2137 Aug 30	2155 Sep 11	2173 Sep 21
44
2191 Oct 02

=== Tritos series ===
This eclipse is a part of a tritos cycle, repeating at alternating nodes every 135 synodic months (≈ 3986.63 days, or 11 years minus 1 month). Their appearance and longitude are irregular due to a lack of synchronization with the anomalistic month (period of perigee), but groupings of 3 tritos cycles (≈ 33 years minus 3 months) come close (≈ 434.044 anomalistic months), so eclipses are similar in these groupings.

Series members between 1801 and 2200
1808 May 10 (Saros 118)	1819 Apr 10 (Saros 119)	1830 Mar 09 (Saros 120)	1841 Feb 06 (Saros 121)	1852 Jan 07 (Saros 122)
1862 Dec 06 (Saros 123)	1873 Nov 04 (Saros 124)	1884 Oct 04 (Saros 125)	1895 Sep 04 (Saros 126)	1906 Aug 04 (Saros 127)
1917 Jul 04 (Saros 128)	1928 Jun 03 (Saros 129)	1939 May 03 (Saros 130)	1950 Apr 02 (Saros 131)	1961 Mar 02 (Saros 132)
1972 Jan 30 (Saros 133)	1982 Dec 30 (Saros 134)	1993 Nov 29 (Saros 135)	2004 Oct 28 (Saros 136)	2015 Sep 28 (Saros 137)
2026 Aug 28 (Saros 138)	2037 Jul 27 (Saros 139)	2048 Jun 26 (Saros 140)	2059 May 27 (Saros 141)	2070 Apr 25 (Saros 142)
2081 Mar 25 (Saros 143)	2092 Feb 23 (Saros 144)	2103 Jan 23 (Saros 145)	2113 Dec 22 (Saros 146)	2124 Nov 21 (Saros 147)
2135 Oct 22 (Saros 148)	2146 Sep 20 (Saros 149)	2157 Aug 20 (Saros 150)	2168 Jul 20 (Saros 151)	2179 Jun 19 (Saros 152)
2190 May 19 (Saros 153)

=== Inex series ===
This eclipse is a part of the long period inex cycle, repeating at alternating nodes, every 358 synodic months (≈ 10,571.95 days, or 29 years minus 20 days). Their appearance and longitude are irregular due to a lack of synchronization with the anomalistic month (period of perigee). However, groupings of 3 inex cycles (≈ 87 years minus 2 months) comes close (≈ 1,151.02 anomalistic months), so eclipses are similar in these groupings.

Series members between 1801 and 2200
1823 Jul 23 (Saros 126)	1852 Jul 01 (Saros 127)	1881 Jun 12 (Saros 128)
1910 May 24 (Saros 129)	1939 May 03 (Saros 130)	1968 Apr 13 (Saros 131)
1997 Mar 24 (Saros 132)	2026 Mar 03 (Saros 133)	2055 Feb 11 (Saros 134)
2084 Jan 22 (Saros 135)	2113 Jan 02 (Saros 136)	2141 Dec 13 (Saros 137)
2170 Nov 23 (Saros 138)	2199 Nov 02 (Saros 139)	

=== Half-Saros cycle ===
A lunar eclipse will be preceded and followed by solar eclipses by 9 years and 5.5 days (a half saros). This lunar eclipse is related to two solar eclipses of Solar Saros 137.

April 28, 1930	May 9, 1948

== See also ==
- List of lunar eclipses
- List of 20th-century lunar eclipses
