= July 2083 lunar eclipse =

Central lunar eclipse

- Total eclipse
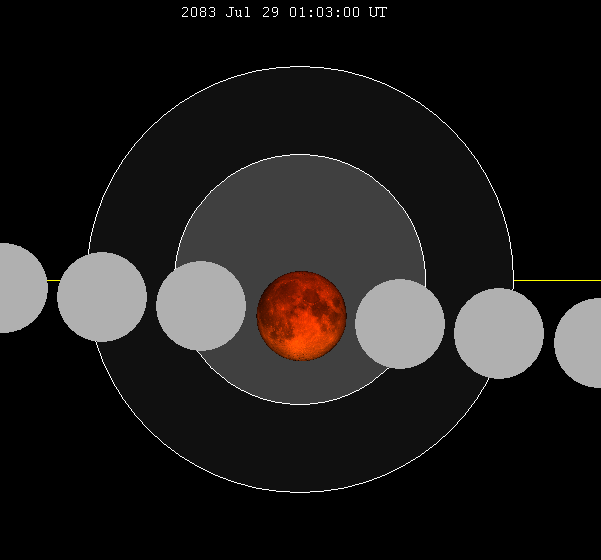
- The Moon's hourly motion shown right to left
- Date: July 28–29, 2083
- Gamma: −0.2143
- Magnitude: 1.4791
- Saros cycle: 130 (38 of 72)
- Totality: 90 minutes, 25 seconds
- Partiality: 212 minutes, 53 seconds
- Penumbral: 328 minutes, 0 seconds
Contacts (UTC)
- P1: 22:18:52
- U1: 23:16:22
- U2: 0:17:36
- Greatest: 1:02:50
- U3: 1:48:01
- U4: 2:49:15
- P4: 3:46:52

A total lunar eclipse will occur at the Moon’s ascending node of orbit on Wednesday, July 28 and Thursday, July 29, 2083, with an umbral magnitude of 1.4791. It will be a central lunar eclipse, in which part of the Moon will pass through the center of the Earth's shadow. A lunar eclipse occurs when the Moon moves into the Earth's shadow, causing the Moon to be darkened. A total lunar eclipse occurs when the Moon's near side entirely passes into the Earth's umbral shadow. Unlike a solar eclipse, which can only be viewed from a relatively small area of the world, a lunar eclipse may be viewed from anywhere on the night side of Earth. A total lunar eclipse can last up to nearly two hours, while a total solar eclipse lasts only a few minutes at any given place, because the Moon's shadow is smaller. Occurring about 2.9 days after perigee (on July 26, 2083, at 2:25 UTC), the Moon's apparent diameter will be larger.

This lunar eclipse will be the second of an almost tetrad, with the others being on February 2, 2083 (total); January 22, 2084 (total); and July 17, 2084 (partial).

This will be the last central lunar eclipse of Lunar Saros 130.

== Visibility ==
The eclipse will be completely visible over much of South America, Africa, western Europe, and Antarctica, seen rising over North America and the eastern Pacific Ocean and setting over eastern Europe, the western half of Asia, and western Australia.

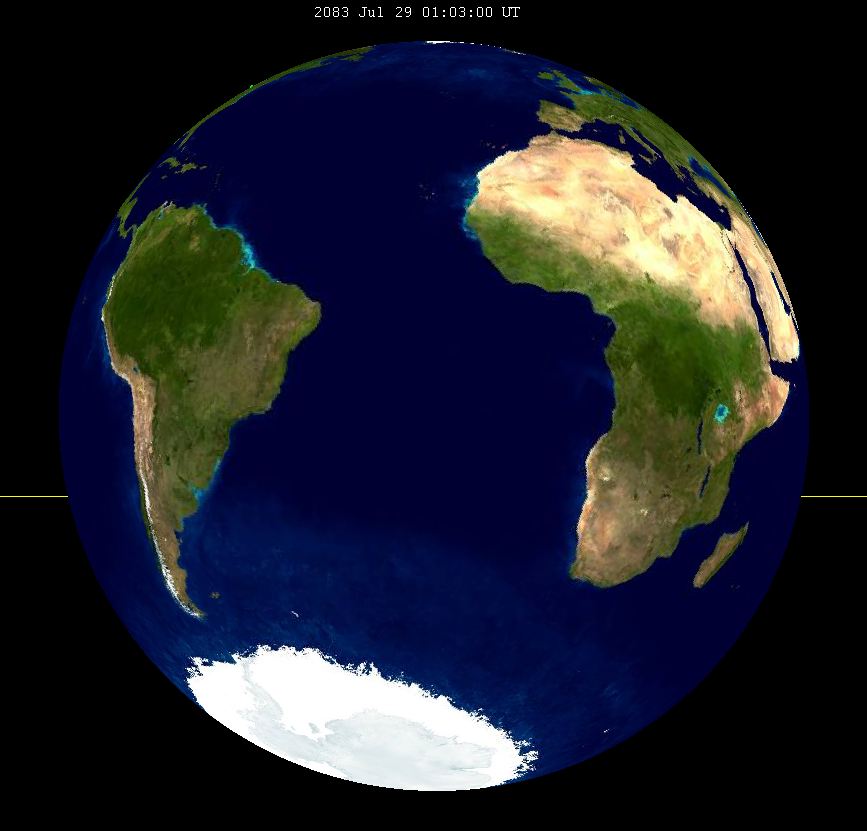
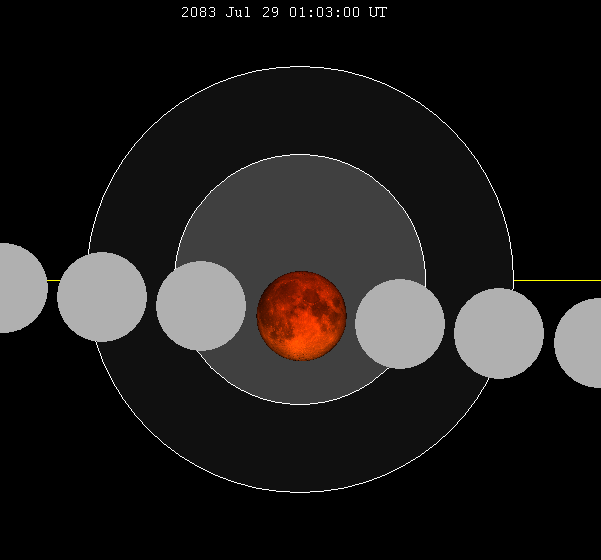

== Eclipse details ==
Shown below is a table displaying details about this particular solar eclipse. It describes various parameters pertaining to this eclipse.

July 28–29, 2083 Lunar Eclipse Parameters
Parameter	Value
Penumbral Magnitude	2.45375
Umbral Magnitude	1.47910
Gamma	−0.21429
Sun Right Ascension	08h34m15.1s
Sun Declination	+18°43'08.7"
Sun Semi-Diameter	15'45.0"
Sun Equatorial Horizontal Parallax	08.7"
Moon Right Ascension	20h34m33.5s
Moon Declination	-18°55'05.1"
Moon Semi-Diameter	16'09.6"
Moon Equatorial Horizontal Parallax	0°59'18.6"
ΔT	111.0 s

== Eclipse season ==
This eclipse is part of an eclipse season, a period, roughly every six months, when eclipses occur. Only two (or occasionally three) eclipse seasons occur each year, and each season lasts about 35 days and repeats just short of six months (173 days) later; thus two full eclipse seasons always occur each year. Either two or three eclipses happen each eclipse season. In the sequence below, each eclipse is separated by a fortnight. The first and last eclipse in this sequence is separated by one synodic month.

Eclipse season of July–August 2083
July 14–15 Descending node (new moon)	July 29 Ascending node (full moon)	August 13 Descending node (new moon)
Partial solar eclipse Solar Saros 118	Total lunar eclipse Lunar Saros 130	Partial solar eclipse Solar Saros 156

== Related eclipses ==
=== Eclipses in 2083 ===
- A total lunar eclipse on February 2.
- A partial solar eclipse on February 16.
- A partial solar eclipse on July 14–15.
- A total lunar eclipse on July 28–29.
- A partial solar eclipse on August 13.

=== Metonic ===
- Preceded by: Lunar eclipse of October 10, 2079
- Followed by: Lunar eclipse of May 17, 2087

=== Tzolkinex ===
- Preceded by: Lunar eclipse of June 16–17, 2076
- Followed by: Lunar eclipse of September 8, 2090

=== Half-Saros ===
- Preceded by: Solar eclipse of July 24, 2074
- Followed by: Solar eclipse of August 3, 2092

=== Tritos ===
- Preceded by: Lunar eclipse of August 28, 2072
- Followed by: Lunar eclipse of June 28, 2094

=== Lunar Saros 130 ===
- Preceded by: Lunar eclipse of July 17, 2065
- Followed by: Lunar eclipse of August 9, 2101

=== Inex ===
- Preceded by: Lunar eclipse of August 18, 2054
- Followed by: Lunar eclipse of July 9, 2112

=== Triad ===
- Preceded by: Lunar eclipse of September 27, 1996
- Followed by: Lunar eclipse of May 29–30, 2170

=== Lunar eclipses of 2082–2085 ===
This eclipse is a member of a semester series. An eclipse in a semester series of lunar eclipses repeats approximately every 177 days and 4 hours (a semester) at alternating nodes of the Moon's orbit.

The penumbral lunar eclipses on June 8, 2085 and December 1, 2085 occur in the next lunar year eclipse set.

Lunar eclipse series sets from 2082 to 2085
Descending node				Ascending node			
Saros	Date Viewing	Type Chart	Gamma	Saros	Date Viewing	Type Chart	Gamma
115	2082 Feb 13	Partial	1.0101	120	2082 Aug 08	Penumbral	−1.0203
125	2083 Feb 02	Total	0.3463	130	2083 Jul 28–29	Total	−0.2143
135	2084 Jan 22	Total	−0.3610	140	2084 Jul 17	Partial	0.5312
145	2085 Jan 10	Penumbral	−1.0453	150	2085 Jul 07	Penumbral	1.2694

=== Saros 130 ===
This eclipse is a part of Saros series 130, repeating every 18 years, 11 days, and containing 71 events. The series started with a penumbral lunar eclipse on June 10, 1416. It contains partial eclipses from September 4, 1560 through April 12, 1903; total eclipses from April 22, 1921 through September 11, 2155; and a second set of partial eclipses from September 21, 2173 through May 10, 2552. The series ends at member 71 as a penumbral eclipse on July 26, 2678.

The longest duration of totality will be produced by member 35 at 101 minutes, 53 seconds on June 26, 2029. All eclipses in this series occur at the Moon’s ascending node of orbit.

Greatest	First			
The greatest eclipse of the series will occur on 2029 Jun 26, lasting 101 minutes, 53 seconds.	Penumbral	Partial	Total	Central
The greatest eclipse of the series will occur on 2029 Jun 26, lasting 101 minutes, 53 seconds.	1416 Jun 10	1560 Sep 04	1921 Apr 22	1975 May 25
The greatest eclipse of the series will occur on 2029 Jun 26, lasting 101 minutes, 53 seconds.	Last			
The greatest eclipse of the series will occur on 2029 Jun 26, lasting 101 minutes, 53 seconds.	Central	Total	Partial	Penumbral
The greatest eclipse of the series will occur on 2029 Jun 26, lasting 101 minutes, 53 seconds.	2083 Jul 29	2155 Sep 11	2552 May 10	2678 Jul 26

Eclipses are tabulated in three columns; every third eclipse in the same column is one exeligmos apart, so they all cast shadows over approximately the same parts of the Earth.

Series members 23–44 occur between 1801 and 2200:
23	24	25
1813 Feb 15	1831 Feb 26	1849 Mar 09
26	27	28
1867 Mar 20	1885 Mar 30	1903 Apr 12
29	30	31
1921 Apr 22	1939 May 03	1957 May 13
32	33	34
1975 May 25	1993 Jun 04	2011 Jun 15
35	36	37
2029 Jun 26	2047 Jul 07	2065 Jul 17
38	39	40
2083 Jul 29	2101 Aug 09	2119 Aug 20
41	42	43
2137 Aug 30	2155 Sep 11	2173 Sep 21
44
2191 Oct 02

=== Tritos series ===
This eclipse is a part of a tritos cycle, repeating at alternating nodes every 135 synodic months (≈ 3986.63 days, or 11 years minus 1 month). Their appearance and longitude are irregular due to a lack of synchronization with the anomalistic month (period of perigee), but groupings of 3 tritos cycles (≈ 33 years minus 3 months) come close (≈ 434.044 anomalistic months), so eclipses are similar in these groupings.

Series members between 1801 and 2200
1810 Sep 13 (Saros 105)	1821 Aug 13 (Saros 106)	1832 Jul 12 (Saros 107)	1843 Jun 12 (Saros 108)	1854 May 12 (Saros 109)
1865 Apr 11 (Saros 110)	1876 Mar 10 (Saros 111)	1887 Feb 08 (Saros 112)	1898 Jan 08 (Saros 113)	1908 Dec 07 (Saros 114)
1919 Nov 07 (Saros 115)	1930 Oct 07 (Saros 116)	1941 Sep 05 (Saros 117)	1952 Aug 05 (Saros 118)	1963 Jul 06 (Saros 119)
1974 Jun 04 (Saros 120)	1985 May 04 (Saros 121)	1996 Apr 04 (Saros 122)	2007 Mar 03 (Saros 123)	2018 Jan 31 (Saros 124)
2028 Dec 31 (Saros 125)	2039 Nov 30 (Saros 126)	2050 Oct 30 (Saros 127)	2061 Sep 29 (Saros 128)	2072 Aug 28 (Saros 129)
2083 Jul 29 (Saros 130)	2094 Jun 28 (Saros 131)	2105 May 28 (Saros 132)	2116 Apr 27 (Saros 133)	2127 Mar 28 (Saros 134)
2138 Feb 24 (Saros 135)	2149 Jan 23 (Saros 136)	2159 Dec 24 (Saros 137)	2170 Nov 23 (Saros 138)	2181 Oct 22 (Saros 139)
2192 Sep 21 (Saros 140)

=== Inex series ===
This eclipse is a part of the long period inex cycle, repeating at alternating nodes, every 358 synodic months (≈ 10,571.95 days, or 29 years minus 20 days). Their appearance and longitude are irregular due to a lack of synchronization with the anomalistic month (period of perigee). However, groupings of 3 inex cycles (≈ 87 years minus 2 months) comes close (≈ 1,151.02 anomalistic months), so eclipses are similar in these groupings.

Series members between 1801 and 2200
1823 Jan 26 (Saros 121)	1852 Jan 07 (Saros 122)	1880 Dec 16 (Saros 123)
1909 Nov 27 (Saros 124)	1938 Nov 07 (Saros 125)	1967 Oct 18 (Saros 126)
1996 Sep 27 (Saros 127)	2025 Sep 07 (Saros 128)	2054 Aug 18 (Saros 129)
2083 Jul 29 (Saros 130)	2112 Jul 09 (Saros 131)	2141 Jun 19 (Saros 132)
2170 May 30 (Saros 133)	2199 May 10 (Saros 134)	

=== Half-Saros cycle ===
A lunar eclipse will be preceded and followed by solar eclipses by 9 years and 5.5 days (a half saros). This lunar eclipse is related to two annular solar eclipses of Solar Saros 137.

July 24, 2074	August 3, 2092

== See also ==
- List of lunar eclipses
- List of 21st-century lunar eclipses
