= May 1957 lunar eclipse =

Total lunar eclipse May 13, 1957

- Total eclipse
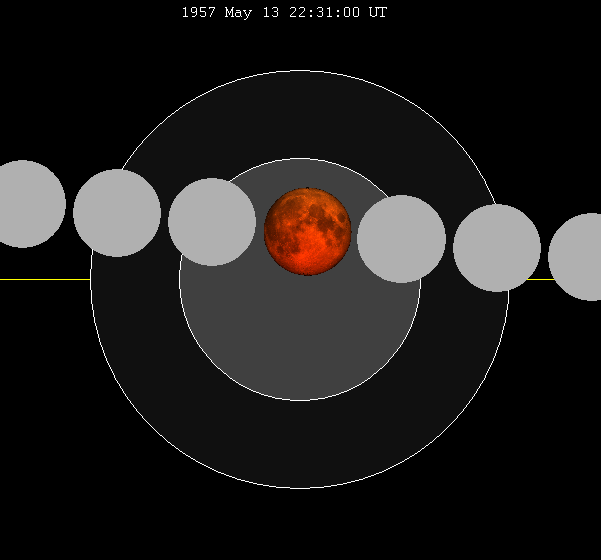
- The Moon's hourly motion shown right to left
- Date: May 13, 1957
- Gamma: 0.3046
- Magnitude: 1.2982
- Saros cycle: 130 (31 of 72)
- Totality: 77 minutes, 39 seconds
- Partiality: 211 minutes, 36 seconds
- Penumbral: 334 minutes, 57 seconds
Contacts (UTC)
- P1: 19:43:30
- U1: 20:45:06
- U2: 21:52:05
- Greatest: 22:30:56
- U3: 23:09:44
- U4: 0:16:42
- P4: 1:18:27

A total lunar eclipse occurred at the Moon’s ascending node of orbit on Monday, May 13, 1957, with an umbral magnitude of 1.2982. A lunar eclipse occurs when the Moon moves into the Earth's shadow, causing the Moon to be darkened. A total lunar eclipse occurs when the Moon's near side entirely passes into the Earth's umbral shadow. Unlike a solar eclipse, which can only be viewed from a relatively small area of the world, a lunar eclipse may be viewed from anywhere on the night side of Earth. A total lunar eclipse can last up to nearly two hours, while a total solar eclipse lasts only a few minutes at any given place, because the Moon's shadow is smaller. Occurring about 3.25 days after perigee (on May 9, 1957, at 4:30 UTC), the Moon's apparent diameter was larger.

This lunar eclipse was the third of an almost tetrad, with the others being on May 24, 1956 (partial); November 18, 1956 (total); and November 7, 1957 (total).

== Visibility ==
The eclipse was completely visible over Europe, Africa, the Middle East, and Antarctica, seen rising over eastern North America and South America and setting over much of Asia and Australia.

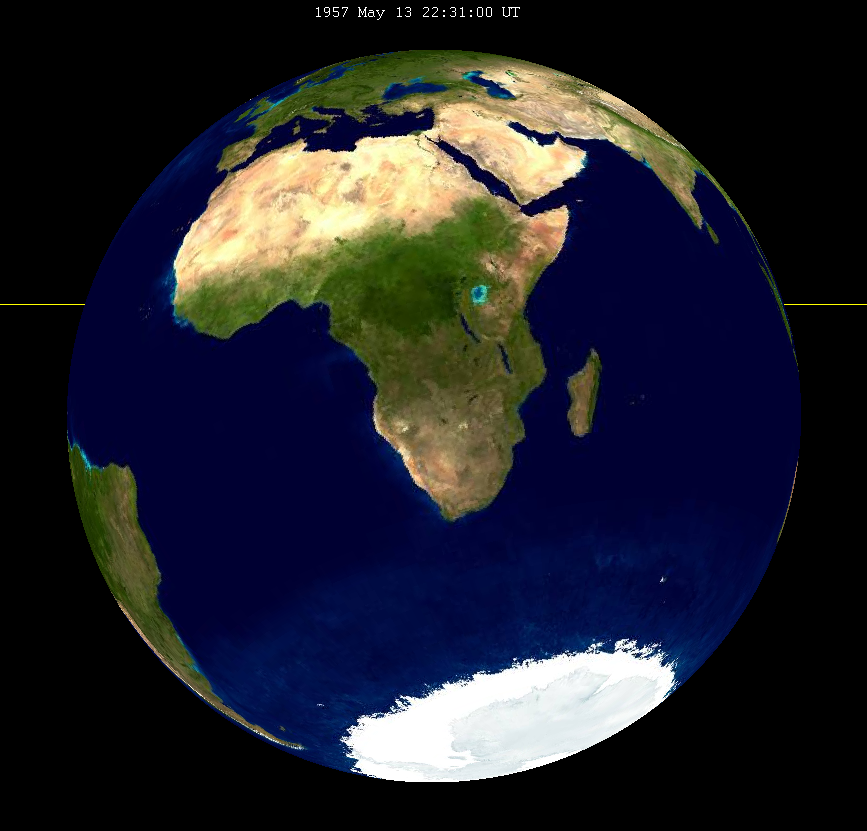
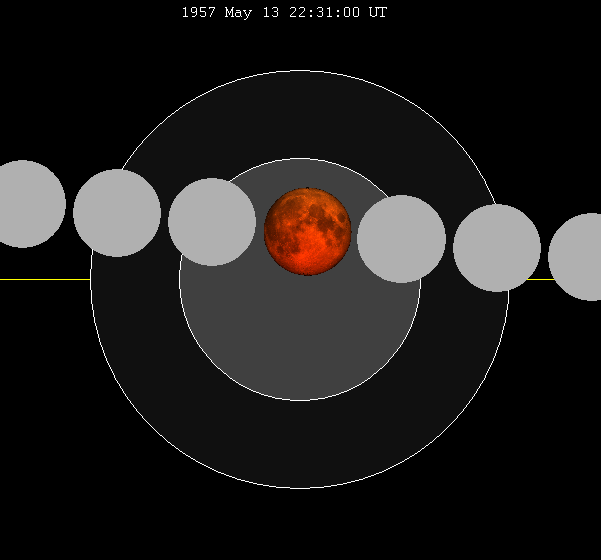

== Eclipse details ==
Shown below is a table displaying details about this particular solar eclipse. It describes various parameters pertaining to this eclipse.

May 13, 1957 Lunar Eclipse Parameters
Parameter	Value
Penumbral Magnitude	2.30005
Umbral Magnitude	1.29822
Gamma	0.30457
Sun Right Ascension	03h21m53.2s
Sun Declination	+18°29'35.8"
Sun Semi-Diameter	15'49.4"
Sun Equatorial Horizontal Parallax	08.7"
Moon Right Ascension	15h22m04.8s
Moon Declination	-18°12'09.6"
Moon Semi-Diameter	15'47.7"
Moon Equatorial Horizontal Parallax	0°57'58.1"
ΔT	32.0 s

== Eclipse season ==
This eclipse is part of an eclipse season, a period, roughly every six months, when eclipses occur. Only two (or occasionally three) eclipse seasons occur each year, and each season lasts about 35 days and repeats just short of six months (173 days) later; thus two full eclipse seasons always occur each year. Either two or three eclipses happen each eclipse season. In the sequence below, each eclipse is separated by a fortnight.

Eclipse season of April–May 1957
April 30 Descending node (new moon)	May 13 Ascending node (full moon)
Annular solar eclipse Solar Saros 118	Total lunar eclipse Lunar Saros 130

== Related eclipses ==
=== Eclipses in 1957 ===
- A non-central annular solar eclipse on April 30.
- A total lunar eclipse on May 13.
- A non-central total solar eclipse on October 23.
- A total lunar eclipse on November 7.

=== Metonic ===
- Preceded by: Lunar eclipse of July 26, 1953
- Followed by: Lunar eclipse of March 2, 1961

=== Tzolkinex ===
- Preceded by: Lunar eclipse of April 2, 1950
- Followed by: Lunar eclipse of June 25, 1964

=== Half-Saros ===
- Preceded by: Solar eclipse of May 9, 1948
- Followed by: Solar eclipse of May 20, 1966

=== Tritos ===
- Preceded by: Lunar eclipse of June 14, 1946
- Followed by: Lunar eclipse of April 13, 1968

=== Lunar Saros 130 ===
- Preceded by: Lunar eclipse of May 3, 1939
- Followed by: Lunar eclipse of May 25, 1975

=== Inex ===
- Preceded by: Lunar eclipse of June 3, 1928
- Followed by: Lunar eclipse of April 24, 1986

=== Triad ===
- Preceded by: Lunar eclipse of July 12, 1870
- Followed by: Lunar eclipse of March 13, 2044

=== Lunar eclipses of 1955–1958 ===
This eclipse is a member of a semester series. An eclipse in a semester series of lunar eclipses repeats approximately every 177 days and 4 hours (a semester) at alternating nodes of the Moon's orbit.

The penumbral lunar eclipse on January 8, 1955 occurs in the previous lunar year eclipse set, and the penumbral lunar eclipse on April 4, 1958 occurs in the next lunar year eclipse set.

Lunar eclipse series sets from 1955 to 1958
Ascending node				Descending node			
Saros	Date Viewing	Type Chart	Gamma	Saros	Date Viewing	Type Chart	Gamma
110	1955 Jun 05	Penumbral	−1.2384	115	1955 Nov 29	Partial	0.9551
120	1956 May 24	Partial	−0.4726	125	1956 Nov 18	Total	0.2917
130	1957 May 13	Total	0.3046	135	1957 Nov 07	Total	−0.4332
140	1958 May 03	Partial	1.0188	145	1958 Oct 27	Penumbral	−1.1571

=== Saros 130 ===
This eclipse is a part of Saros series 130, repeating every 18 years, 11 days, and containing 71 events. The series started with a penumbral lunar eclipse on June 10, 1416. It contains partial eclipses from September 4, 1560 through April 12, 1903; total eclipses from April 22, 1921 through September 11, 2155; and a second set of partial eclipses from September 21, 2173 through May 10, 2552. The series ends at member 71 as a penumbral eclipse on July 26, 2678.

The longest duration of totality will be produced by member 35 at 101 minutes, 53 seconds on June 26, 2029. All eclipses in this series occur at the Moon’s ascending node of orbit.

Greatest	First			
The greatest eclipse of the series will occur on 2029 Jun 26, lasting 101 minutes, 53 seconds.	Penumbral	Partial	Total	Central
The greatest eclipse of the series will occur on 2029 Jun 26, lasting 101 minutes, 53 seconds.	1416 Jun 10	1560 Sep 04	1921 Apr 22	1975 May 25
The greatest eclipse of the series will occur on 2029 Jun 26, lasting 101 minutes, 53 seconds.	Last			
The greatest eclipse of the series will occur on 2029 Jun 26, lasting 101 minutes, 53 seconds.	Central	Total	Partial	Penumbral
The greatest eclipse of the series will occur on 2029 Jun 26, lasting 101 minutes, 53 seconds.	2083 Jul 29	2155 Sep 11	2552 May 10	2678 Jul 26

Eclipses are tabulated in three columns; every third eclipse in the same column is one exeligmos apart, so they all cast shadows over approximately the same parts of the Earth.

Series members 23–44 occur between 1801 and 2200:
23	24	25
1813 Feb 15	1831 Feb 26	1849 Mar 09
26	27	28
1867 Mar 20	1885 Mar 30	1903 Apr 12
29	30	31
1921 Apr 22	1939 May 03	1957 May 13
32	33	34
1975 May 25	1993 Jun 04	2011 Jun 15
35	36	37
2029 Jun 26	2047 Jul 07	2065 Jul 17
38	39	40
2083 Jul 29	2101 Aug 09	2119 Aug 20
41	42	43
2137 Aug 30	2155 Sep 11	2173 Sep 21
44
2191 Oct 02

=== Tritos series ===
This eclipse is a part of a tritos cycle, repeating at alternating nodes every 135 synodic months (≈ 3986.63 days, or 11 years minus 1 month). Their appearance and longitude are irregular due to a lack of synchronization with the anomalistic month (period of perigee), but groupings of 3 tritos cycles (≈ 33 years minus 3 months) come close (≈ 434.044 anomalistic months), so eclipses are similar in these groupings.

Series members between 1801 and 2200
1804 Jul 22 (Saros 116)	1815 Jun 21 (Saros 117)	1826 May 21 (Saros 118)	1837 Apr 20 (Saros 119)	1848 Mar 19 (Saros 120)
1859 Feb 17 (Saros 121)	1870 Jan 17 (Saros 122)	1880 Dec 16 (Saros 123)	1891 Nov 16 (Saros 124)	1902 Oct 17 (Saros 125)
1913 Sep 15 (Saros 126)	1924 Aug 14 (Saros 127)	1935 Jul 16 (Saros 128)	1946 Jun 14 (Saros 129)	1957 May 13 (Saros 130)
1968 Apr 13 (Saros 131)	1979 Mar 13 (Saros 132)	1990 Feb 09 (Saros 133)	2001 Jan 09 (Saros 134)	2011 Dec 10 (Saros 135)
2022 Nov 08 (Saros 136)	2033 Oct 08 (Saros 137)	2044 Sep 07 (Saros 138)	2055 Aug 07 (Saros 139)	2066 Jul 07 (Saros 140)
2077 Jun 06 (Saros 141)	2088 May 05 (Saros 142)	2099 Apr 05 (Saros 143)	2110 Mar 06 (Saros 144)	2121 Feb 02 (Saros 145)
2132 Jan 02 (Saros 146)	2142 Dec 03 (Saros 147)	2153 Nov 01 (Saros 148)	2164 Sep 30 (Saros 149)	2175 Aug 31 (Saros 150)
2186 Jul 31 (Saros 151)	2197 Jun 29 (Saros 152)			

=== Inex series ===
This eclipse is a part of the long period inex cycle, repeating at alternating nodes, every 358 synodic months (≈ 10,571.95 days, or 29 years minus 20 days). Their appearance and longitude are irregular due to a lack of synchronization with the anomalistic month (period of perigee). However, groupings of 3 inex cycles (≈ 87 years minus 2 months) comes close (≈ 1,151.02 anomalistic months), so eclipses are similar in these groupings.

Series members between 1801 and 2200
1812 Aug 22 (Saros 125)	1841 Aug 02 (Saros 126)	1870 Jul 12 (Saros 127)
1899 Jun 23 (Saros 128)	1928 Jun 03 (Saros 129)	1957 May 13 (Saros 130)
1986 Apr 24 (Saros 131)	2015 Apr 04 (Saros 132)	2044 Mar 13 (Saros 133)
2073 Feb 22 (Saros 134)	2102 Feb 03 (Saros 135)	2131 Jan 13 (Saros 136)
2159 Dec 24 (Saros 137)	2188 Dec 04 (Saros 138)	

=== Half-Saros cycle ===
A lunar eclipse will be preceded and followed by solar eclipses by 9 years and 5.5 days (a half saros). This lunar eclipse is related to two annular solar eclipses of Solar Saros 137.

May 9, 1948	May 20, 1966

== See also ==
- List of lunar eclipses
- List of 20th-century lunar eclipses
