= June 1993 lunar eclipse =

Total lunar eclipse June 4, 1993

- Total eclipse
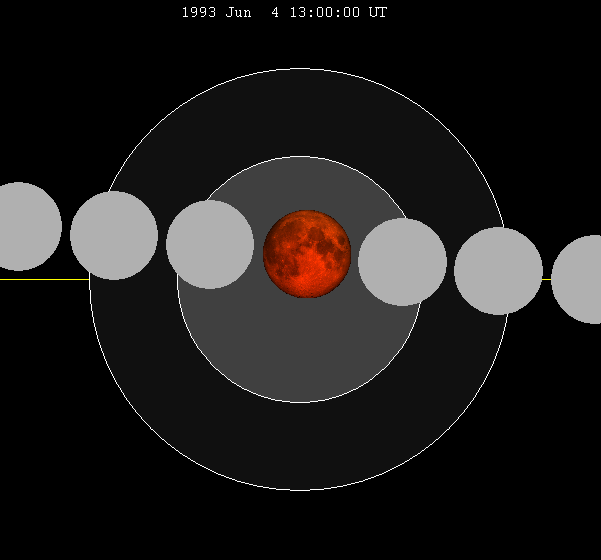
- The Moon's hourly motion shown right to left
- Date: June 4, 1993
- Gamma: 0.1638
- Magnitude: 1.5617
- Saros cycle: 130 (33 of 72)
- Totality: 95 minutes, 48 seconds
- Partiality: 217 minutes, 50 seconds
- Penumbral: 336 minutes, 20 seconds
Contacts (UTC)
- P1: 10:12:20
- U1: 11:11:30
- U2: 12:12:32
- Greatest: 13:00:27
- U3: 13:48:20
- U4: 14:49:21
- P4: 15:48:39

External image
- http://www.phys.ttu.edu/~ozprof/le4693.htm

A total lunar eclipse occurred at the Moon’s ascending node of orbit on Friday, June 4, 1993, with an umbral magnitude of 1.5617. It was a central lunar eclipse, in which part of the Moon passed through the center of the Earth's shadow. A lunar eclipse occurs when the Moon moves into the Earth's shadow, causing the Moon to be darkened. A total lunar eclipse occurs when the Moon's near side entirely passes into the Earth's umbral shadow. Unlike a solar eclipse, which can only be viewed from a relatively small area of the world, a lunar eclipse may be viewed from anywhere on the night side of Earth. A total lunar eclipse can last up to nearly two hours, while a total solar eclipse lasts only a few minutes at any given place, because the Moon's shadow is smaller. Occurring about 4.1 days after perigee (on May 31, 1993, at 12:10 UTC), the Moon's apparent diameter was larger.

== Visibility ==
The eclipse was completely visible over Australia, Antarctica, and the western and central Pacific Ocean, seen rising over much of Asia and southeast Africa and setting over western and central North America and western South America.

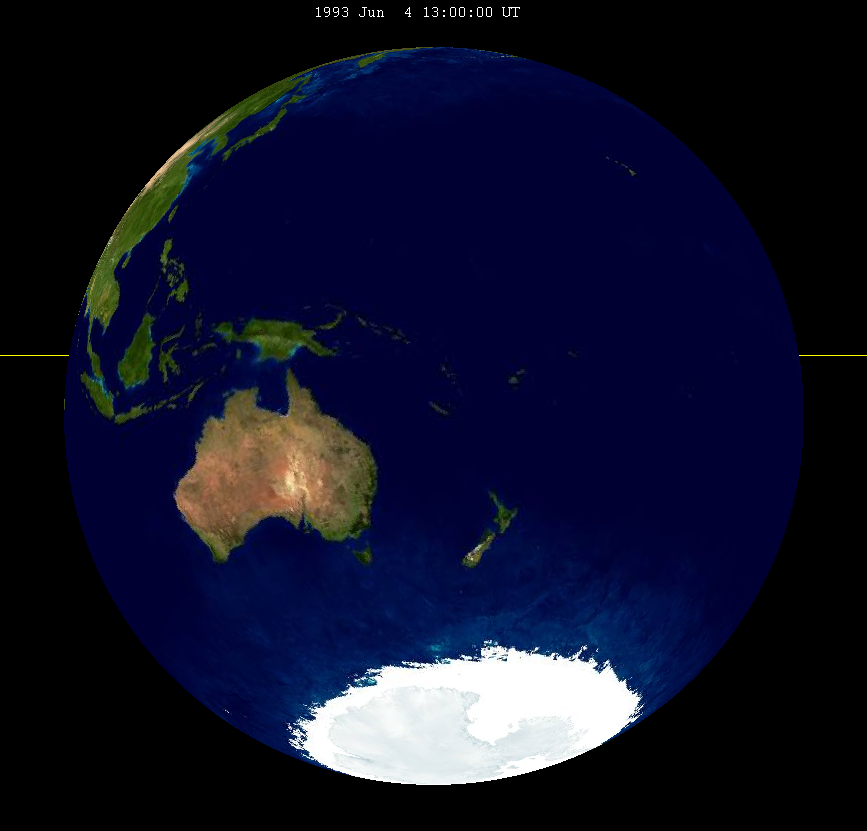
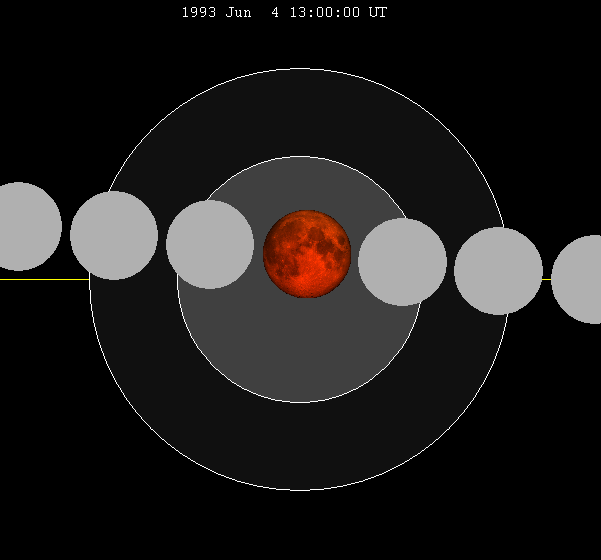

== Eclipse details ==
Shown below is a table displaying details about this particular solar eclipse. It describes various parameters pertaining to this eclipse.

June 4, 1993 Lunar Eclipse Parameters
Parameter	Value
Penumbral Magnitude	2.55318
Umbral Magnitude	1.56173
Gamma	0.16376
Sun Right Ascension	04h50m12.3s
Sun Declination	+22°28'11.9"
Sun Semi-Diameter	15'45.9"
Sun Equatorial Horizontal Parallax	08.7"
Moon Right Ascension	16h50m13.2s
Moon Declination	-22°18'38.7"
Moon Semi-Diameter	15'54.0"
Moon Equatorial Horizontal Parallax	0°58'21.4"
ΔT	59.5 s

== Eclipse season ==
This eclipse is part of an eclipse season, a period, roughly every six months, when eclipses occur. Only two (or occasionally three) eclipse seasons occur each year, and each season lasts about 35 days and repeats just short of six months (173 days) later; thus two full eclipse seasons always occur each year. Either two or three eclipses happen each eclipse season. In the sequence below, each eclipse is separated by a fortnight.

Eclipse season of May–June 1993
May 21 Descending node (new moon)	June 4 Ascending node (full moon)
Partial solar eclipse Solar Saros 118	Total lunar eclipse Lunar Saros 130

== Related eclipses ==
=== Eclipses in 1993 ===
- A partial solar eclipse on May 21.
- A total lunar eclipse on June 4.
- A partial solar eclipse on November 13.
- A total lunar eclipse on November 29.

=== Metonic ===
- Preceded by: Lunar eclipse of August 17, 1989
- Followed by: Lunar eclipse of March 24, 1997

=== Tzolkinex ===
- Preceded by: Lunar eclipse of April 24, 1986
- Followed by: Lunar eclipse of July 16, 2000

=== Half-Saros ===
- Preceded by: Solar eclipse of May 30, 1984
- Followed by: Solar eclipse of June 10, 2002

=== Tritos ===
- Preceded by: Lunar eclipse of July 6, 1982
- Followed by: Lunar eclipse of May 4, 2004

=== Lunar Saros 130 ===
- Preceded by: Lunar eclipse of May 25, 1975
- Followed by: Lunar eclipse of June 15, 2011

=== Inex ===
- Preceded by: Lunar eclipse of June 25, 1964
- Followed by: Lunar eclipse of May 16, 2022

=== Triad ===
- Preceded by: Lunar eclipse of August 4, 1906
- Followed by: Lunar eclipse of April 4, 2080

=== Lunar eclipses of 1991–1994 ===
This eclipse is a member of a semester series. An eclipse in a semester series of lunar eclipses repeats approximately every 177 days and 4 hours (a semester) at alternating nodes of the Moon's orbit.

The penumbral lunar eclipses on January 30, 1991 and July 26, 1991 occur in the previous lunar year eclipse set.

Lunar eclipse series sets from 1991 to 1994
Ascending node				Descending node			
Saros	Date Viewing	Type Chart	Gamma	Saros	Date Viewing	Type Chart	Gamma
110	1991 Jun 27	Penumbral	−1.4064	115	1991 Dec 21	Partial	0.9709
120	1992 Jun 15	Partial	−0.6289	125	1992 Dec 09	Total	0.3144
130	1993 Jun 04	Total	0.1638	135	1993 Nov 29	Total	−0.3994
140	1994 May 25	Partial	0.8933	145	1994 Nov 18	Penumbral	−1.1048

=== Saros 130 ===
This eclipse is a part of Saros series 130, repeating every 18 years, 11 days, and containing 71 events. The series started with a penumbral lunar eclipse on June 10, 1416. It contains partial eclipses from September 4, 1560 through April 12, 1903; total eclipses from April 22, 1921 through September 11, 2155; and a second set of partial eclipses from September 21, 2173 through May 10, 2552. The series ends at member 71 as a penumbral eclipse on July 26, 2678.

The longest duration of totality will be produced by member 35 at 101 minutes, 53 seconds on June 26, 2029. All eclipses in this series occur at the Moon’s ascending node of orbit.

Greatest	First			
The greatest eclipse of the series will occur on 2029 Jun 26, lasting 101 minutes, 53 seconds.	Penumbral	Partial	Total	Central
The greatest eclipse of the series will occur on 2029 Jun 26, lasting 101 minutes, 53 seconds.	1416 Jun 10	1560 Sep 04	1921 Apr 22	1975 May 25
The greatest eclipse of the series will occur on 2029 Jun 26, lasting 101 minutes, 53 seconds.	Last			
The greatest eclipse of the series will occur on 2029 Jun 26, lasting 101 minutes, 53 seconds.	Central	Total	Partial	Penumbral
The greatest eclipse of the series will occur on 2029 Jun 26, lasting 101 minutes, 53 seconds.	2083 Jul 29	2155 Sep 11	2552 May 10	2678 Jul 26

Eclipses are tabulated in three columns; every third eclipse in the same column is one exeligmos apart, so they all cast shadows over approximately the same parts of the Earth.

Series members 23–44 occur between 1801 and 2200:
23	24	25
1813 Feb 15	1831 Feb 26	1849 Mar 09
26	27	28
1867 Mar 20	1885 Mar 30	1903 Apr 12
29	30	31
1921 Apr 22	1939 May 03	1957 May 13
32	33	34
1975 May 25	1993 Jun 04	2011 Jun 15
35	36	37
2029 Jun 26	2047 Jul 07	2065 Jul 17
38	39	40
2083 Jul 29	2101 Aug 09	2119 Aug 20
41	42	43
2137 Aug 30	2155 Sep 11	2173 Sep 21
44
2191 Oct 02

=== Tritos series ===
This eclipse is a part of a tritos cycle, repeating at alternating nodes every 135 synodic months (≈ 3986.63 days, or 11 years minus 1 month). Their appearance and longitude are irregular due to a lack of synchronization with the anomalistic month (period of perigee), but groupings of 3 tritos cycles (≈ 33 years minus 3 months) come close (≈ 434.044 anomalistic months), so eclipses are similar in these groupings.

Series members between 1801 and 2200
1807 Nov 15 (Saros 113)	1818 Oct 14 (Saros 114)	1829 Sep 13 (Saros 115)	1840 Aug 13 (Saros 116)	1851 Jul 13 (Saros 117)
1862 Jun 12 (Saros 118)	1873 May 12 (Saros 119)	1884 Apr 10 (Saros 120)	1895 Mar 11 (Saros 121)	1906 Feb 09 (Saros 122)
1917 Jan 08 (Saros 123)	1927 Dec 08 (Saros 124)	1938 Nov 07 (Saros 125)	1949 Oct 07 (Saros 126)	1960 Sep 05 (Saros 127)
1971 Aug 06 (Saros 128)	1982 Jul 06 (Saros 129)	1993 Jun 04 (Saros 130)	2004 May 04 (Saros 131)	2015 Apr 04 (Saros 132)
2026 Mar 03 (Saros 133)	2037 Jan 31 (Saros 134)	2048 Jan 01 (Saros 135)	2058 Nov 30 (Saros 136)	2069 Oct 30 (Saros 137)
2080 Sep 29 (Saros 138)	2091 Aug 29 (Saros 139)	2102 Jul 30 (Saros 140)	2113 Jun 29 (Saros 141)	2124 May 28 (Saros 142)
2135 Apr 28 (Saros 143)	2146 Mar 28 (Saros 144)	2157 Feb 24 (Saros 145)	2168 Jan 24 (Saros 146)	2178 Dec 24 (Saros 147)
2189 Nov 22 (Saros 148)	2200 Oct 23 (Saros 149)			

=== Inex series ===
This eclipse is a part of the long period inex cycle, repeating at alternating nodes, every 358 synodic months (≈ 10,571.95 days, or 29 years minus 20 days). Their appearance and longitude are irregular due to a lack of synchronization with the anomalistic month (period of perigee). However, groupings of 3 inex cycles (≈ 87 years minus 2 months) comes close (≈ 1,151.02 anomalistic months), so eclipses are similar in these groupings.

Series members between 1801 and 2200
1819 Oct 03 (Saros 124)	1848 Sep 13 (Saros 125)	1877 Aug 23 (Saros 126)
1906 Aug 04 (Saros 127)	1935 Jul 16 (Saros 128)	1964 Jun 25 (Saros 129)
1993 Jun 04 (Saros 130)	2022 May 16 (Saros 131)	2051 Apr 26 (Saros 132)
2080 Apr 04 (Saros 133)	2109 Mar 17 (Saros 134)	2138 Feb 24 (Saros 135)
2167 Feb 04 (Saros 136)	2196 Jan 15 (Saros 137)	

=== Half-Saros cycle ===
A lunar eclipse will be preceded and followed by solar eclipses by 9 years and 5.5 days (a half saros). This lunar eclipse is related to two annular solar eclipses of Solar Saros 137.

May 30, 1984	June 10, 2002

== See also ==
- List of lunar eclipses
- List of 20th-century lunar eclipses
