= July 2065 lunar eclipse =

Astronomical event

- Total eclipse
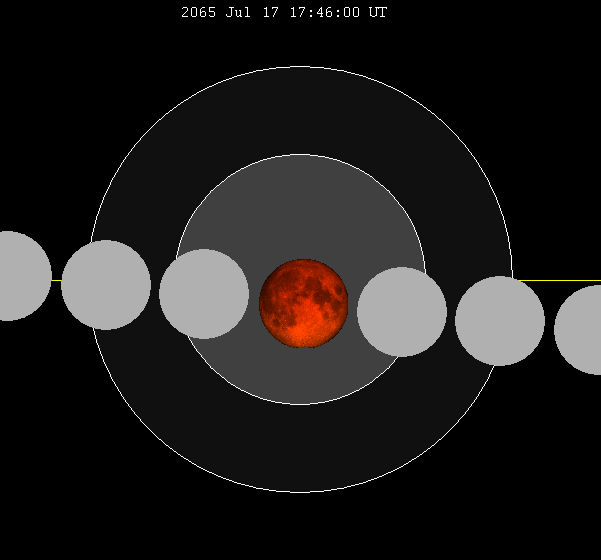
- The Moon's hourly motion shown right to left
- Date: July 17, 2065
- Gamma: −0.1402
- Magnitude: 1.6138
- Saros cycle: 130 (37 of 71)
- Totality: 97 minutes, 43 seconds
- Partiality: 217 minutes, 1 second
- Penumbral: 331 minutes, 43 seconds
Contacts (UTC)
- P1: 15:02:47
- U1: 16:00:10
- U2: 16:59:51
- Greatest: 17:48:40
- U3: 18:37:34
- U4: 19:37:11
- P4: 20:34:40

A total lunar eclipse will occur at the Moon’s ascending node of orbit on Friday, July 17, 2065, with an umbral magnitude of 1.6628. It will be a central lunar eclipse, in which part of the Moon will pass through the center of the Earth's shadow. A lunar eclipse occurs when the Moon moves into the Earth's shadow, causing the Moon to be darkened. A total lunar eclipse occurs when the Moon's near side entirely passes into the Earth's umbral shadow. Unlike a solar eclipse, which can only be viewed from a relatively small area of the world, a lunar eclipse may be viewed from anywhere on the night side of Earth. A total lunar eclipse can last up to nearly two hours, while a total solar eclipse lasts only a few minutes at any given place, because the Moon's shadow is smaller. Occurring about 4.2 days after perigee (on July 14, 2065, at 13:50 UTC), the Moon's apparent diameter will be larger.

== Visibility ==
The eclipse will be completely visible over south and east Asia, Australia, and Antarctica, seen rising over much of Africa, Europe, and west and central Asia and setting over northeast Asia and the central Pacific Ocean.

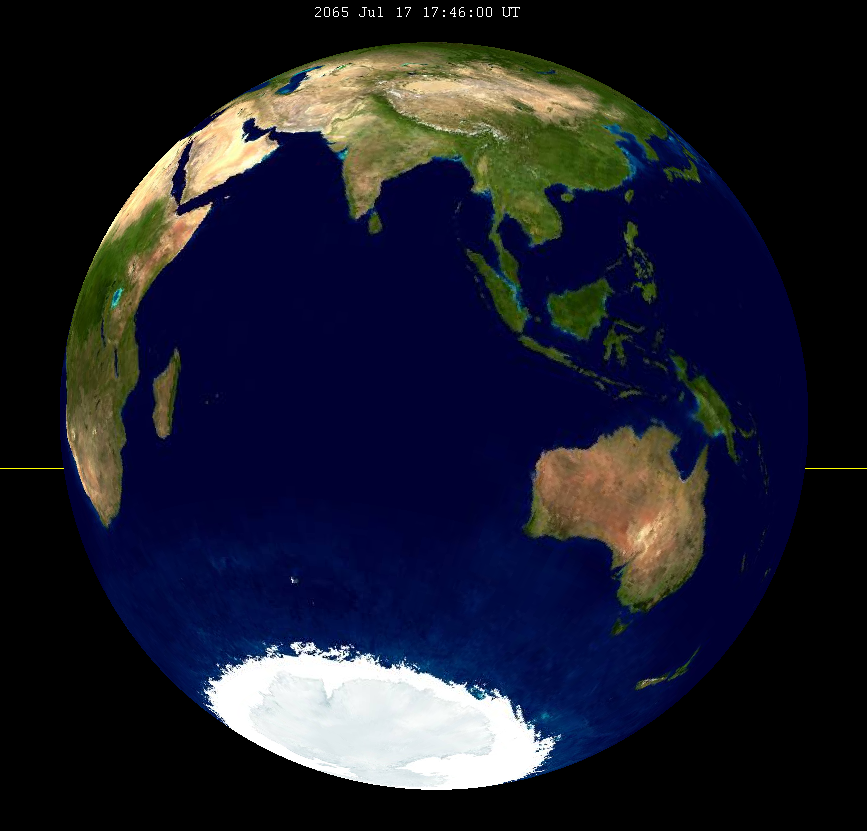
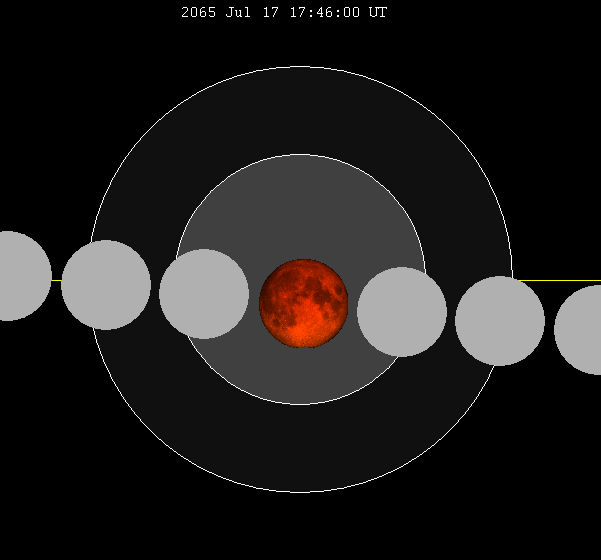

== Eclipse details ==
Shown below is a table displaying details about this particular lunar eclipse. It describes various parameters pertaining to this eclipse.

July 17, 2065 lunar eclipse parameters
Parameter	Value
Penumbral magnitude	2.59069
Umbral magnitude	1.61381
Gamma	−0.14023
Sun right ascension	07h50m48.2s
Sun declination	+20°59'34.9"
Sun semi-diameter	15'44.3"
Sun equatorial horizontal parallax	08.7"
Moon right ascension	19h50m58.2s
Moon declination	-21°07'32.3"
Moon semi-diameter	16'06.6"
Moon equatorial horizontal parallax	0°59'07.5"
ΔT	96.0 s

== Eclipse season ==
This eclipse is part of an eclipse season, a period, roughly every six months, when eclipses occur. Only two (or occasionally three) eclipse seasons occur each year, and each season lasts about 35 days and repeats just short of six months (173 days) later; thus two full eclipse seasons always occur each year. Either two or three eclipses happen each eclipse season. In the sequence below, each eclipse is separated by a fortnight. The first and last eclipse in this sequence is separated by one synodic month.

Eclipse season of July–August 2065
July 3 Descending node (new moon)	July 17 Ascending node (full moon)	August 2 Descending node (new moon)
Partial solar eclipse Solar Saros 118	Total lunar eclipse Lunar Saros 130	Partial solar eclipse Solar Saros 156

== Related eclipses ==
=== Eclipses in 2065 ===
- A total lunar eclipse on January 22
- A partial solar eclipse on February 5
- A partial solar eclipse on July 3
- A total lunar eclipse on July 17
- A partial solar eclipse on August 2
- A partial solar eclipse on December 27

=== Metonic ===
- Preceded by: Lunar eclipse of September 29, 2061
- Followed by: Lunar eclipse of May 6, 2069

=== Tzolkinex ===
- Preceded by: Lunar eclipse of June 6, 2058
- Followed by: Lunar eclipse of August 29, 2072

=== Half-Saros ===
- Preceded by: Solar eclipse of July 12, 2056
- Followed by: Solar eclipse of July 24, 2074

=== Tritos ===
- Preceded by: Lunar eclipse of August 18, 2054
- Followed by: Lunar eclipse of June 17, 2076

=== Lunar Saros 130 ===
- Preceded by: Lunar eclipse of July 7, 2047
- Followed by: Lunar eclipse of July 29, 2083

=== Inex ===
- Preceded by: Lunar eclipse of August 7, 2036
- Followed by: Lunar eclipse of June 28, 2094

=== Triad ===
- Preceded by: Lunar eclipse of September 16, 1978
- Followed by: Lunar eclipse of May 18, 2152

=== Lunar eclipses of 2064–2067 ===
This eclipse is a member of a semester series. An eclipse in a semester series of lunar eclipses repeats approximately every 177 days and 4 hours (a semester) at alternating nodes of the Moon's orbit.

The penumbral lunar eclipses on May 28, 2067 and November 21, 2067 occur in the next lunar year eclipse set.

Lunar eclipse series sets from 2064 to 2067
Descending node				Ascending node			
Saros	Date Viewing	Type Chart	Gamma	Saros	Date Viewing	Type Chart	Gamma
115	2064 Feb 02	Partial	0.9969	120	2064 Jul 28	Partial	−0.9473
125	2065 Jan 22	Total	0.3371	130	2065 Jul 17	Total	−0.1402
135	2066 Jan 11	Total	−0.3687	140	2066 Jul 07	Partial	0.6055
145	2066 Dec 31	Penumbral	−1.0539	150	2067 Jun 27	Penumbral	1.3394

=== Saros 130 ===
This eclipse is a part of Saros series 130, repeating every 18 years, 11 days, and containing 71 events. The series started with a penumbral lunar eclipse on June 10, 1416. It contains partial eclipses from September 4, 1560 through April 12, 1903; total eclipses from April 22, 1921 through September 11, 2155; and a second set of partial eclipses from September 21, 2173 through May 10, 2552. The series ends at member 71 as a penumbral eclipse on July 26, 2678.

The longest duration of totality will be produced by member 35 at 101 minutes, 53 seconds on June 26, 2029. All eclipses in this series occur at the Moon’s ascending node of orbit.

Greatest	First			
The greatest eclipse of the series will occur on 2029 Jun 26, lasting 101 minutes, 53 seconds.	Penumbral	Partial	Total	Central
The greatest eclipse of the series will occur on 2029 Jun 26, lasting 101 minutes, 53 seconds.	1416 Jun 10	1560 Sep 04	1921 Apr 22	1975 May 25
The greatest eclipse of the series will occur on 2029 Jun 26, lasting 101 minutes, 53 seconds.	Last			
The greatest eclipse of the series will occur on 2029 Jun 26, lasting 101 minutes, 53 seconds.	Central	Total	Partial	Penumbral
The greatest eclipse of the series will occur on 2029 Jun 26, lasting 101 minutes, 53 seconds.	2083 Jul 29	2155 Sep 11	2552 May 10	2678 Jul 26

Eclipses are tabulated in three columns; every third eclipse in the same column is one exeligmos apart, so they all cast shadows over approximately the same parts of the Earth.

Series members 23–44 occur between 1801 and 2200:
23	24	25
1813 Feb 15	1831 Feb 26	1849 Mar 09
26	27	28
1867 Mar 20	1885 Mar 30	1903 Apr 12
29	30	31
1921 Apr 22	1939 May 03	1957 May 13
32	33	34
1975 May 25	1993 Jun 04	2011 Jun 15
35	36	37
2029 Jun 26	2047 Jul 07	2065 Jul 17
38	39	40
2083 Jul 29	2101 Aug 09	2119 Aug 20
41	42	43
2137 Aug 30	2155 Sep 11	2173 Sep 21
44
2191 Oct 02

=== Tritos series ===
This eclipse is a part of a tritos cycle, repeating at alternating nodes every 135 synodic months (≈ 3986.63 days, or 11 years minus 1 month). Their appearance and longitude are irregular due to a lack of synchronization with the anomalistic month (period of perigee), but groupings of 3 tritos cycles (≈ 33 years minus 3 months) come close (≈ 434.044 anomalistic months), so eclipses are similar in these groupings.

Series members between 1801 and 2200
1803 Aug 03 (Saros 106)	1814 Jul 02 (Saros 107)	1825 Jun 01 (Saros 108)	1836 May 01 (Saros 109)	1847 Mar 31 (Saros 110)
1858 Feb 27 (Saros 111)	1869 Jan 28 (Saros 112)	1879 Dec 28 (Saros 113)	1890 Nov 26 (Saros 114)	1901 Oct 27 (Saros 115)
1912 Sep 26 (Saros 116)	1923 Aug 26 (Saros 117)	1934 Jul 26 (Saros 118)	1945 Jun 25 (Saros 119)	1956 May 24 (Saros 120)
1967 Apr 24 (Saros 121)	1978 Mar 24 (Saros 122)	1989 Feb 20 (Saros 123)	2000 Jan 21 (Saros 124)	2010 Dec 21 (Saros 125)
2021 Nov 19 (Saros 126)	2032 Oct 18 (Saros 127)	2043 Sep 19 (Saros 128)	2054 Aug 18 (Saros 129)	2065 Jul 17 (Saros 130)
2076 Jun 17 (Saros 131)	2087 May 17 (Saros 132)	2098 Apr 15 (Saros 133)	2109 Mar 17 (Saros 134)	2120 Feb 14 (Saros 135)
2131 Jan 13 (Saros 136)	2141 Dec 13 (Saros 137)	2152 Nov 12 (Saros 138)	2163 Oct 12 (Saros 139)	2174 Sep 11 (Saros 140)
2185 Aug 11 (Saros 141)	2196 Jul 10 (Saros 142)			

=== Inex series ===
This eclipse is a part of the long period inex cycle, repeating at alternating nodes, every 358 synodic months (≈ 10,571.95 days, or 29 years minus 20 days). Their appearance and longitude are irregular due to a lack of synchronization with the anomalistic month (period of perigee). However, groupings of 3 inex cycles (≈ 87 years minus 2 months) comes close (≈ 1,151.02 anomalistic months), so eclipses are similar in these groupings.

Series members between 1801 and 2200
1805 Jan 15 (Saros 121)	1833 Dec 26 (Saros 122)	1862 Dec 06 (Saros 123)
1891 Nov 16 (Saros 124)	1920 Oct 27 (Saros 125)	1949 Oct 07 (Saros 126)
1978 Sep 16 (Saros 127)	2007 Aug 28 (Saros 128)	2036 Aug 07 (Saros 129)
2065 Jul 17 (Saros 130)	2094 Jun 28 (Saros 131)	2123 Jun 09 (Saros 132)
2152 May 18 (Saros 133)	2181 Apr 29 (Saros 134)	

=== Half-Saros cycle ===
A lunar eclipse will be preceded and followed by solar eclipses by 9 years and 5.5 days (a half saros). This lunar eclipse is related to two annular solar eclipses of Solar Saros 137.

July 12, 2056	July 24, 2074

== See also ==
- List of lunar eclipses
- List of 21st-century lunar eclipses
