= April 1903 lunar eclipse =

Partial lunar eclipse in 1903

- Partial eclipse
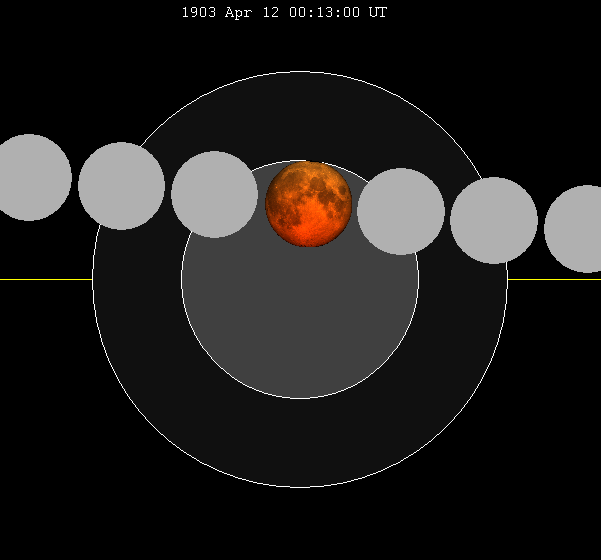
- The Moon's hourly motion shown right to left
- Date: April 12, 1903
- Gamma: 0.4798
- Magnitude: 0.9677
- Saros cycle: 130 (28 of 72)
- Partiality: 196 minutes, 31 seconds
- Penumbral: 330 minutes, 6 seconds
Contacts (UTC)
- P1: 21:27:26
- U1: 22:34:39
- Greatest: 0:12:58
- U4: 1:51:11
- P4: 2:58:02

A partial lunar eclipse occurred at the Moon’s ascending node of orbit on Sunday, April 12, 1903, with an umbral magnitude of 0.9677. A lunar eclipse occurs when the Moon moves into the Earth's shadow, causing the Moon to be darkened. A partial lunar eclipse occurs when one part of the Moon is in the Earth's umbra, while the other part is in the Earth's penumbra. Unlike a solar eclipse, which can only be viewed from a relatively small area of the world, a lunar eclipse may be viewed from anywhere on the night side of Earth. The Moon's apparent diameter was near the average diameter because it occurred 6.2 days after perigee (on April 5, 1903, at 18:45 UTC) and 7.1 days before apogee (on April 19, 1903, at 4:35 UTC).

This nearly total lunar eclipse of Lunar Saros 130 preceded the first total eclipse of the series on April 22, 1921.

It occurred on Easter Sunday (Gregorian only), for the first time since 1846.

== Visibility ==
The eclipse was completely visible over eastern South America, Africa, Europe, and Antarctica, seen rising over western South America and much of North America and setting over much of Asia and western Australia.

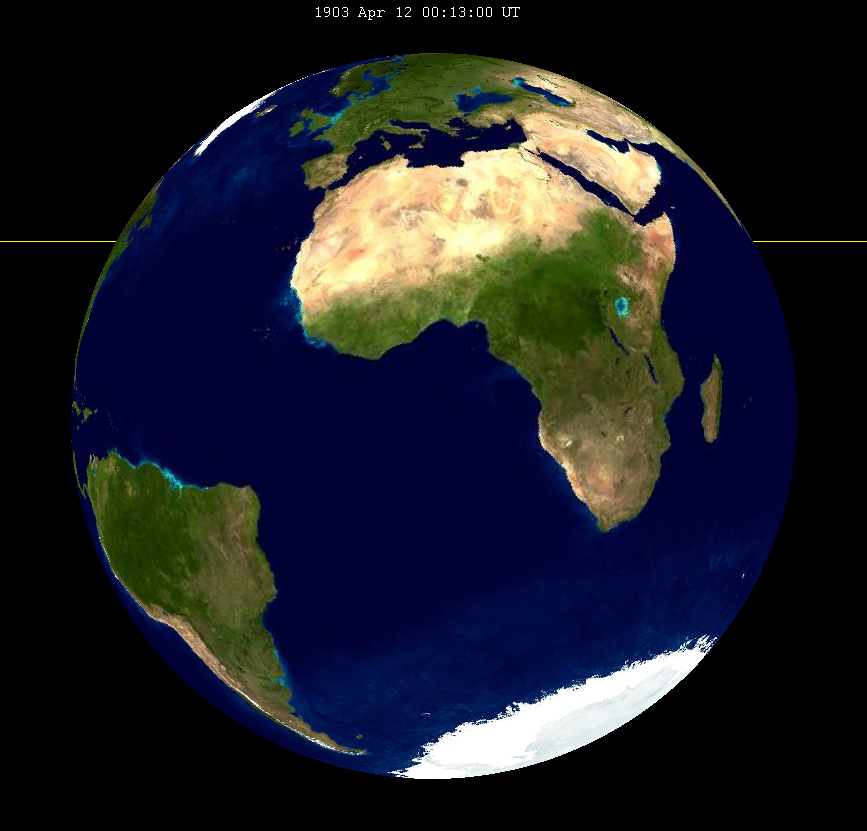
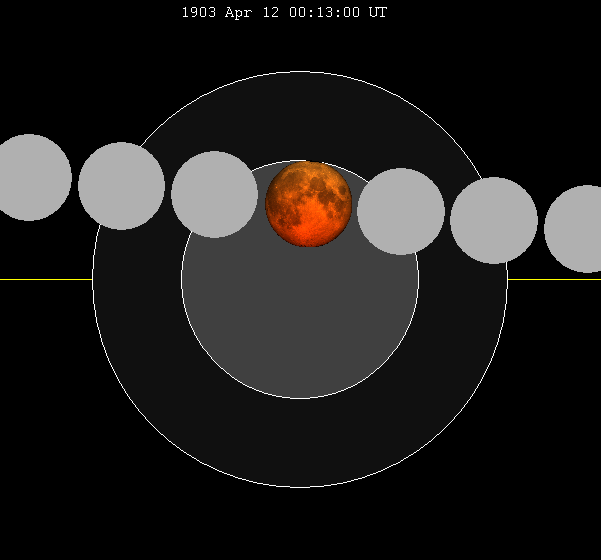

== Eclipse details ==
Shown below is a table displaying details about this particular lunar eclipse. It describes various parameters pertaining to this eclipse.

April 12, 1903 Lunar Eclipse Parameters
Parameter	Value
Penumbral Magnitude	1.98771
Umbral Magnitude	0.96765
Gamma	0.47981
Sun Right Ascension	01h17m19.0s
Sun Declination	+08°10'13.1"
Sun Semi-Diameter	15'57.3"
Sun Equatorial Horizontal Parallax	08.8"
Moon Right Ascension	13h17m50.3s
Moon Declination	-07°43'47.7"
Moon Semi-Diameter	15'38.4"
Moon Equatorial Horizontal Parallax	0°57'24.1"
ΔT	1.6 s

== Eclipse season ==
This eclipse is part of an eclipse season, a period, roughly every six months, when eclipses occur. Only two (or occasionally three) eclipse seasons occur each year, and each season lasts about 35 days and repeats just short of six months (173 days) later; thus two full eclipse seasons always occur each year. Either two or three eclipses happen each eclipse season. In the sequence below, each eclipse is separated by a fortnight.

Eclipse season of March–April 1903
March 29 Descending node (new moon)	April 12 Ascending node (full moon)
Annular solar eclipse Solar Saros 118	Partial lunar eclipse Lunar Saros 130

== Related eclipses ==
=== Eclipses in 1903 ===
- An annular solar eclipse on March 29.
- A partial lunar eclipse on April 12.
- A total solar eclipse on September 21.
- A partial lunar eclipse on October 6.

=== Metonic ===
- Preceded by: Lunar eclipse of June 23, 1899
- Followed by: Lunar eclipse of January 29, 1907

=== Tzolkinex ===
- Preceded by: Lunar eclipse of February 28, 1896
- Followed by: Lunar eclipse of May 24, 1910

=== Half-Saros ===
- Preceded by: Solar eclipse of April 6, 1894
- Followed by: Solar eclipse of April 17, 1912

=== Tritos ===
- Preceded by: Lunar eclipse of May 11, 1892
- Followed by: Lunar eclipse of March 12, 1914

=== Lunar Saros 130 ===
- Preceded by: Lunar eclipse of March 30, 1885
- Followed by: Lunar eclipse of April 22, 1921

=== Inex ===
- Preceded by: Lunar eclipse of May 1, 1874
- Followed by: Lunar eclipse of March 22, 1932

=== Triad ===
- Preceded by: Lunar eclipse of June 10, 1816
- Followed by: Lunar eclipse of February 9, 1990

=== Lunar eclipses of 1901–1904 ===
This eclipse is a member of a semester series. An eclipse in a semester series of lunar eclipses repeats approximately every 177 days and 4 hours (a semester) at alternating nodes of the Moon's orbit.

The penumbral lunar eclipse on March 2, 1904 occurs in the next lunar year eclipse set.

Lunar eclipse series sets from 1901 to 1904
Ascending node				Descending node			
Saros	Date Viewing	Type Chart	Gamma	Saros	Date Viewing	Type Chart	Gamma
110	1901 May 03	Penumbral	−1.0101	115	1901 Oct 27	Partial	0.9021
120	1902 Apr 22	Total	−0.2680	125	1902 Oct 17	Total	0.2201
130	1903 Apr 12	Partial	0.4798	135	1903 Oct 06	Partial	−0.5280
140	1904 Mar 31	Penumbral	1.1665	145	1904 Sep 24	Penumbral	−1.2837

=== Saros 130 ===
This eclipse is a part of Saros series 130, repeating every 18 years, 11 days, and containing 71 events. The series started with a penumbral lunar eclipse on June 10, 1416. It contains partial eclipses from September 4, 1560 through April 12, 1903; total eclipses from April 22, 1921 through September 11, 2155; and a second set of partial eclipses from September 21, 2173 through May 10, 2552. The series ends at member 71 as a penumbral eclipse on July 26, 2678.

The longest duration of totality will be produced by member 35 at 101 minutes, 53 seconds on June 26, 2029. All eclipses in this series occur at the Moon’s ascending node of orbit.

Greatest	First			
The greatest eclipse of the series will occur on 2029 Jun 26, lasting 101 minutes, 53 seconds.	Penumbral	Partial	Total	Central
The greatest eclipse of the series will occur on 2029 Jun 26, lasting 101 minutes, 53 seconds.	1416 Jun 10	1560 Sep 04	1921 Apr 22	1975 May 25
The greatest eclipse of the series will occur on 2029 Jun 26, lasting 101 minutes, 53 seconds.	Last			
The greatest eclipse of the series will occur on 2029 Jun 26, lasting 101 minutes, 53 seconds.	Central	Total	Partial	Penumbral
The greatest eclipse of the series will occur on 2029 Jun 26, lasting 101 minutes, 53 seconds.	2083 Jul 29	2155 Sep 11	2552 May 10	2678 Jul 26

Eclipses are tabulated in three columns; every third eclipse in the same column is one exeligmos apart, so they all cast shadows over approximately the same parts of the Earth.

Series members 23–44 occur between 1801 and 2200:
23	24	25
1813 Feb 15	1831 Feb 26	1849 Mar 09
26	27	28
1867 Mar 20	1885 Mar 30	1903 Apr 12
29	30	31
1921 Apr 22	1939 May 03	1957 May 13
32	33	34
1975 May 25	1993 Jun 04	2011 Jun 15
35	36	37
2029 Jun 26	2047 Jul 07	2065 Jul 17
38	39	40
2083 Jul 29	2101 Aug 09	2119 Aug 20
41	42	43
2137 Aug 30	2155 Sep 11	2173 Sep 21
44
2191 Oct 02

=== Tritos series ===
This eclipse is a part of a tritos cycle, repeating at alternating nodes every 135 synodic months (≈ 3986.63 days, or 11 years minus 1 month). Their appearance and longitude are irregular due to a lack of synchronization with the anomalistic month (period of perigee), but groupings of 3 tritos cycles (≈ 33 years minus 3 months) come close (≈ 434.044 anomalistic months), so eclipses are similar in these groupings.

Series members between 1801 and 2187
1805 Jan 15 (Saros 121)	1815 Dec 16 (Saros 122)	1826 Nov 14 (Saros 123)	1837 Oct 13 (Saros 124)	1848 Sep 13 (Saros 125)
1859 Aug 13 (Saros 126)	1870 Jul 12 (Saros 127)	1881 Jun 12 (Saros 128)	1892 May 11 (Saros 129)	1903 Apr 12 (Saros 130)
1914 Mar 12 (Saros 131)	1925 Feb 08 (Saros 132)	1936 Jan 08 (Saros 133)	1946 Dec 08 (Saros 134)	1957 Nov 07 (Saros 135)
1968 Oct 06 (Saros 136)	1979 Sep 06 (Saros 137)	1990 Aug 06 (Saros 138)	2001 Jul 05 (Saros 139)	2012 Jun 04 (Saros 140)
2023 May 05 (Saros 141)	2034 Apr 03 (Saros 142)	2045 Mar 03 (Saros 143)	2056 Feb 01 (Saros 144)	2066 Dec 31 (Saros 145)
2077 Nov 29 (Saros 146)	2088 Oct 30 (Saros 147)	2099 Sep 29 (Saros 148)	2110 Aug 29 (Saros 149)	2121 Jul 30 (Saros 150)
2132 Jun 28 (Saros 151)	2143 May 28 (Saros 152)	2154 Apr 28 (Saros 153)		
2187 Jan 24 (Saros 156)

=== Inex series ===
This eclipse is a part of the long period inex cycle, repeating at alternating nodes, every 358 synodic months (≈ 10,571.95 days, or 29 years minus 20 days). Their appearance and longitude are irregular due to a lack of synchronization with the anomalistic month (period of perigee). However, groupings of 3 inex cycles (≈ 87 years minus 2 months) comes close (≈ 1,151.02 anomalistic months), so eclipses are similar in these groupings.

Series members between 1801 and 2200
1816 Jun 10 (Saros 127)	1845 May 21 (Saros 128)	1874 May 01 (Saros 129)
1903 Apr 12 (Saros 130)	1932 Mar 22 (Saros 131)	1961 Mar 02 (Saros 132)
1990 Feb 09 (Saros 133)	2019 Jan 21 (Saros 134)	2048 Jan 01 (Saros 135)
2076 Dec 10 (Saros 136)	2105 Nov 21 (Saros 137)	2134 Nov 02 (Saros 138)
2163 Oct 12 (Saros 139)	2192 Sep 21 (Saros 140)	

=== Half-Saros cycle ===
A lunar eclipse will be preceded and followed by solar eclipses by 9 years and 5.5 days (a half saros). This lunar eclipse is related to two hybrid solar eclipses of Solar Saros 137.

April 6, 1894	April 17, 1912

== See also ==
- List of lunar eclipses
- List of 20th-century lunar eclipses
