= Lunar Saros 130 =

Eclipse cycle of the moon

Member 34
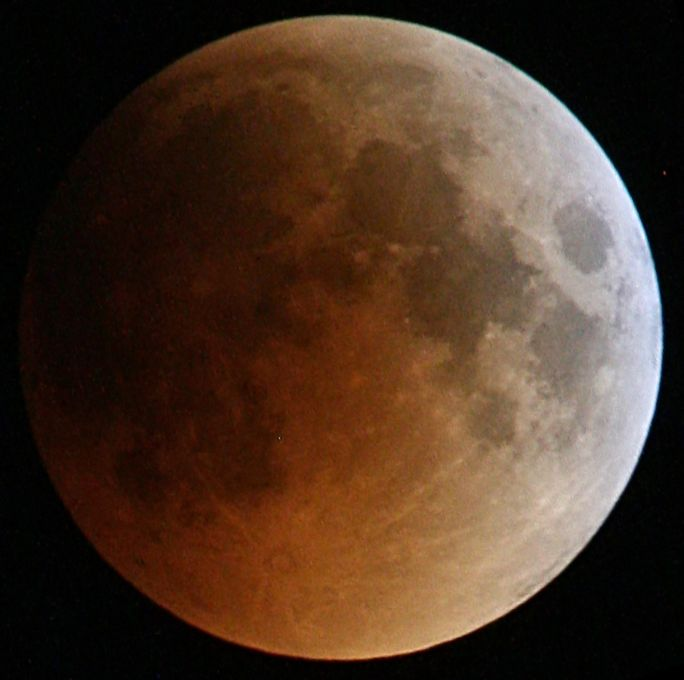
June 15, 2011

Saros cycle series 130 for lunar eclipses occurs at the moon's ascending node, repeats every 18 years 11 1/3 days. The 130th lunar saros is associated with Solar Saros 137, with an event occurring every 9 years 5 days alternating between each saros series..

Lunar saros 130 contains 71 member events, with all eclipses in which the penumbral (or eclipse) magnitude is over 0.01 . It has 14 total eclipses, starting in 1921 and ending in 2155.

It consists of 8 penumbral eclipses, 20 partial eclipses, 14 total eclipses, 22 partial eclipses, and ends with 7 penumbral eclipses.

== Summary ==
This eclipse is a part of Saros series 130, repeating every 18 years, 11 days, and containing 71 events. The series started with a penumbral lunar eclipse on June 10, 1416. It contains partial eclipses from September 4, 1560 through April 12, 1903; total eclipses from April 22, 1921 through September 11, 2155; and a second set of partial eclipses from September 21, 2173 through May 10, 2552. The series ends at member 71 as a penumbral eclipse on July 26, 2678.

The longest duration of totality will be produced by member 35 at 101 minutes, 53 seconds on June 26, 2029. All eclipses in this series occur at the Moon’s ascending node of orbit.

Greatest	First			
The greatest eclipse of the series will occur on 2029 Jun 26, lasting 101 minutes, 53 seconds.	Penumbral	Partial	Total	Central
The greatest eclipse of the series will occur on 2029 Jun 26, lasting 101 minutes, 53 seconds.	1416 Jun 10	1560 Sep 04	1921 Apr 22	1975 May 25
The greatest eclipse of the series will occur on 2029 Jun 26, lasting 101 minutes, 53 seconds.	Last			
The greatest eclipse of the series will occur on 2029 Jun 26, lasting 101 minutes, 53 seconds.	Central	Total	Partial	Penumbral
The greatest eclipse of the series will occur on 2029 Jun 26, lasting 101 minutes, 53 seconds.	2083 Jul 29	2155 Sep 11	2552 May 10	2678 Jul 26

Eclipses are tabulated in three columns; every third eclipse in the same column is one exeligmos apart, so they all cast shadows over approximately the same parts of the Earth.

Series members 23–44 occur between 1801 and 2200:
23	24	25
1813 Feb 15	1831 Feb 26	1849 Mar 09
26	27	28
1867 Mar 20	1885 Mar 30	1903 Apr 12
29	30	31
1921 Apr 22	1939 May 03	1957 May 13
32	33	34
1975 May 25	1993 Jun 04	2011 Jun 15
35	36	37
2029 Jun 26	2047 Jul 07	2065 Jul 17
38	39	40
2083 Jul 29	2101 Aug 09	2119 Aug 20
41	42	43
2137 Aug 30	2155 Sep 11	2173 Sep 21
44
2191 Oct 02

== List ==
Cat.	Saros	Mem	Date	Time UT (hr:mn)	Type	Gamma	Magnitude	Duration (min)			Contacts UT (hr:mn)						Chart
Cat.	Saros	Mem	Date	Greatest	Type	Gamma	Magnitude	Pen.	Par.	Tot.	P1	P4	U1	U2	U3	U4	Chart
08243	130	1	1416 Jun 10	11:56:50	Penumbral	1.5632	-1.0441	48.1			11:32:47	12:20:53					
08285	130	2	1434 Jun 21	18:20:00	Penumbral	1.4767	-0.8850	130.6			17:14:42	19:25:18					
08326	130	3	1452 Jul 02	0:45:25	Penumbral	1.3910	-0.7275	175.5			23:17:40	2:13:10					
08367	130	4	1470 Jul 13	7:13:12	Penumbral	1.3060	-0.5715	208.7			5:28:51	8:57:33					
08406	130	5	1488 Jul 23	13:46:42	Penumbral	1.2247	-0.4223	234.4			11:49:30	15:43:54					
08446	130	6	1506 Aug 03	20:24:30	Penumbral	1.1456	-0.2776	255.4			18:16:48	22:32:12					
08487	130	7	1524 Aug 14	3:11:11	Penumbral	1.0728	-0.1443	272.1			0:55:08	5:27:14					
08528	130	8	1542 Aug 25	10:04:53	Penumbral	1.0046	-0.0196	285.8			7:41:59	12:27:47					
08571	130	9	1560 Sep 04	17:08:50	Partial	0.9440	0.0910	296.6	72.8		14:40:32	19:37:08	16:32:26			17:45:14	
08614	130	10	1578 Sep 16	0:21:28	Partial	0.8897	0.1901	305.2	103.5		21:48:52	2:54:04	23:29:43			1:13:13	
08657	130	11	1596 Oct 06	7:45:10	Partial	0.8436	0.2743	311.8	122.6		5:09:16	10:21:04	6:43:52			8:46:28	
08701	130	12	1614 Oct 17	15:18:17	Partial	0.8043	0.3458	316.8	135.9		12:39:53	17:56:41	14:10:20			16:26:14	
08745	130	13	1632 Oct 27	23:00:32	Partial	0.7718	0.4051	320.5	145.4		20:20:17	1:40:47	21:47:50			0:13:14	
08789	130	14	1650 Nov 08	6:52:25	Partial	0.7464	0.4515	323.1	152.0		4:10:52	9:33:58	5:36:25			8:08:25	
08834	130	15	1668 Nov 18	14:52:18	Partial	0.7274	0.4865	324.6	156.6		12:10:00	17:34:36	13:34:00			16:10:36	
08880	130	16	1686 Nov 29	22:59:47	Partial	0.7134	0.5126	325.4	159.7		20:17:05	1:42:29	21:39:56			0:19:38	
08926	130	17	1704 Dec 11	7:11:30	Partial	0.7023	0.5336	325.7	162.0		4:28:39	9:54:21	5:50:30			8:32:30	
08973	130	18	1722 Dec 22	15:28:30	Partial	0.6947	0.5485	325.5	163.4		12:45:45	18:11:15	14:06:48			16:50:12	
09020	130	19	1741 Jan 01	23:47:06	Partial	0.6880	0.5621	325.1	164.6		21:04:33	2:29:39	22:24:48			1:09:24	
09067	130	20	1759 Jan 13	8:06:35	Partial	0.6812	0.5762	324.6	165.9		5:24:17	10:48:53	6:43:38			9:29:32	
09113	130	21	1777 Jan 23	16:24:09	Partial	0.6723	0.5944	324.3	167.5		13:42:00	19:06:18	15:00:24			17:47:54	
09158	130	22	1795 Feb 04	0:39:45	Partial	0.6610	0.6175	324.1	169.7		21:57:42	3:21:48	23:14:54			2:04:36	
09203	130	23	1813 Feb 15	8:50:46	Partial	0.6453	0.6488	324.2	172.5		6:08:40	11:32:52	7:24:31			10:17:01	
09248	130	24	1831 Feb 26	16:56:21	Partial	0.6246	0.6897	324.7	176.2		14:14:00	19:38:42	15:28:15			18:24:27	
09295	130	25	1849 Mar 09	0:55:49	Partial	0.5980	0.7414	325.6	180.6		22:13:01	3:38:37	23:25:31			2:26:07	
09339	130	26	1867 Mar 20	8:49:01	Partial	0.5656	0.8038	326.8	185.5		6:05:37	11:32:25	7:16:16			10:21:46	
09382	130	27	1885 Mar 30	16:34:07	Partial	0.5257	0.8802	328.4	191.0		13:49:55	19:18:19	14:58:37			18:09:37	
09426	130	28	1903 Apr 12	0:12:59	Partial	0.4798	0.9677	330.1	196.5		21:27:56	2:58:02	22:34:44			1:51:14	
09468	130	29	1921 Apr 22	7:44:39	Total	0.4269	1.0678	331.9	202.0	40.1	4:58:42	10:30:36	6:03:39	7:24:36	8:04:42	9:25:39	
09510	130	30	1939 May 03	15:11:43	Total	0.3693	1.1765	333.5	207.1	62.4	12:24:58	17:58:28	13:28:10	14:40:31	15:42:55	16:55:16	
09551	130	31	1957 May 13	22:31:28	Total	0.3045	1.2982	335.0	211.6	77.6	19:43:58	1:18:58	20:45:40	21:52:40	23:10:16	0:17:16	
09593	130	32	1975 May 25	5:48:47	Total	0.2367	1.4253	335.9	215.2	88.3	3:00:50	8:36:44	4:01:11	5:04:38	6:32:56	7:36:23	
09634	130	33	1993 Jun 04	13:01:26	Total	0.1638	1.5617	336.3	217.8	95.8	10:13:17	15:49:35	11:12:32	12:13:32	13:49:20	14:50:20	
09675	130	34	2011 Jun 15	20:13:43	Total	0.0897	1.6999	336.1	219.3	100.2	17:25:40	23:01:46	18:24:04	19:23:37	21:03:49	22:03:22	
09716	130	35	2029 Jun 26	3:23:22	Total	0.0124	1.8436	335.1	219.5	101.9	0:35:49	6:10:55	1:33:37	2:32:25	4:14:19	5:13:07	
09756	130	36	2047 Jul 07	10:35:45	Total	-0.0636	1.7513	333.4	218.5	100.8	7:49:03	13:22:27	8:46:30	9:45:21	11:26:09	12:25:00	
09797	130	37	2065 Jul 17	17:48:40	Total	-0.1402	1.6121	331.0	216.3	97.0	15:03:10	20:34:10	16:00:31	17:00:10	18:37:10	19:36:49	
09838	130	38	2083 Jul 29	1:05:34	Total	-0.2143	1.4773	328.0	212.9	90.4	22:21:34	3:49:34	23:19:07	0:20:22	1:50:46	2:52:01	
09880	130	39	2101 Aug 09	8:25:33	Total	-0.2864	1.3458	324.4	208.4	80.7	5:43:21	11:07:45	6:41:21	7:45:12	9:05:54	10:09:45	
09922	130	40	2119 Aug 20	15:51:55	Total	-0.3538	1.2227	320.3	203.1	67.3	13:11:46	18:32:04	14:10:22	15:18:16	16:25:34	17:33:28	
09965	130	41	2137 Aug 30	23:24:05	Total	-0.4171	1.1069	315.9	197.1	48.3	20:46:08	2:02:02	21:45:32	22:59:56	23:48:14	1:02:38	
10010	130	42	2155 Sep 11	7:03:11	Total	-0.4752	1.0003	311.4	190.7	2.6	4:27:29	9:38:53	5:27:50	7:01:53	7:04:29	8:38:32	
10053	130	43	2173 Sep 21	14:50:18	Partial	-0.5272	0.9047	306.9	184.0		12:16:51	17:23:45	13:18:18			16:22:18	
10096	130	44	2191 Oct 02	22:45:48	Partial	-0.5729	0.8206	302.6	177.4		20:14:30	1:17:06	21:17:06			0:14:30	
10139	130	45	2209 Oct 14	6:49:53	Partial	-0.6119	0.7487	298.6	171.1		4:20:35	9:19:11	5:24:20			8:15:26	
10183	130	46	2227 Oct 25	15:02:23	Partial	-0.6444	0.6886	295.1	165.4		12:34:50	17:29:56	13:39:41			16:25:05	
10228	130	47	2245 Nov 04	23:23:16	Partial	-0.6707	0.6399	292.0	160.4		20:57:16	1:49:16	22:03:04			0:43:28	
10274	130	48	2263 Nov 16	7:52:13	Partial	-0.6908	0.6027	289.5	156.3		5:27:28	10:16:58	6:34:04			9:10:22	
10320	130	49	2281 Nov 26	16:27:11	Partial	-0.7064	0.5737	287.5	153.0		14:03:26	18:50:56	15:10:41			17:43:41	
10366	130	50	2299 Dec 08	1:09:08	Partial	-0.7167	0.5547	286.0	150.6		22:46:08	3:32:08	23:53:50			2:24:26	
10412	130	51	2317 Dec 19	9:55:14	Partial	-0.7237	0.5419	284.9	149.0		7:32:47	12:17:41	8:40:44			11:09:44	
10458	130	52	2335 Dec 30	18:45:24	Partial	-0.7278	0.5345	284.0	148.0		16:23:24	21:07:24	17:31:24			19:59:24	
10504	130	53	2354 Jan 10	3:35:57	Partial	-0.7321	0.5271	283.2	147.0		1:14:21	5:57:33	2:22:27			4:49:27	
10550	130	54	2372 Jan 21	12:27:44	Partial	-0.7353	0.5218	282.4	146.2		10:06:32	14:48:56	11:14:38			13:40:50	
10594	130	55	2390 Jan 31	21:17:34	Partial	-0.7404	0.5133	281.5	145.1		18:56:49	23:38:19	20:05:01			22:30:07	
10639	130	56	2408 Feb 12	6:04:35	Partial	-0.7479	0.5006	280.2	143.5		3:44:29	8:24:41	4:52:50			7:16:20	
10683	130	57	2426 Feb 22	14:46:52	Partial	-0.7594	0.4805	278.5	140.9		12:27:37	17:06:07	13:36:25			15:57:19	
10727	130	58	2444 Mar 04	23:24:12	Partial	-0.7754	0.4526	276.3	137.3		21:06:03	1:42:21	22:15:33			0:32:51	
10770	130	59	2462 Mar 16	7:55:14	Partial	-0.7966	0.4150	273.3	132.2		5:38:35	10:11:53	6:49:08			9:01:20	
10812	130	60	2480 Mar 26	16:18:42	Partial	-0.8242	0.3659	269.5	125.1		14:03:57	18:33:27	15:16:09			17:21:15	
10853	130	61	2498 Apr 07	0:35:16	Partial	-0.8576	0.3058	264.8	115.3		22:22:52	2:47:40	23:37:37			1:32:55	
10894	130	62	2516 Apr 18	8:44:26	Partial	-0.8975	0.2341	258.9	102.0		6:34:59	10:53:53	7:53:26			9:35:26	
10934	130	63	2534 Apr 29	16:45:47	Partial	-0.9439	0.1502	251.6	82.7		14:39:59	18:51:35	16:04:26			17:27:08	
10975	130	64	2552 May 10	0:40:14	Partial	-0.9961	0.0554	242.8	50.9		22:38:50	2:41:38	0:14:47			1:05:41	
11017	130	65	2570 May 21	8:28:02	Penumbral	-1.0538	-0.0497	232.2			6:31:56	10:24:08					
11057	130	66	2588 May 31	16:10:46	Penumbral	-1.1157	-0.1626	219.7			14:20:55	18:00:37					
11097	130	67	2606 Jun 12	23:46:43	Penumbral	-1.1830	-0.2858	204.3			22:04:34	1:28:52					
11137	130	68	2624 Jun 23	7:19:46	Penumbral	-1.2525	-0.4131	186.0			5:46:46	8:52:46					
11178	130	69	2642 Jul 04	14:48:51	Penumbral	-1.3251	-0.5466	163.4			13:27:09	16:10:33					
11219	130	70	2660 Jul 14	22:16:53	Penumbral	-1.3979	-0.6807	135.3			21:09:14	23:24:32					
11262	130	71	2678 Jul 26	5:42:41	Penumbral	-1.4721	-0.8178	96.2			4:54:35	6:30:47					

== See also ==
- List of lunar eclipses
  - List of Saros series for lunar eclipses
