= Solar Saros 137 =

Series of solar eclipses

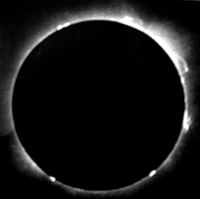
April 17, 1912 Totality from France Series member 30

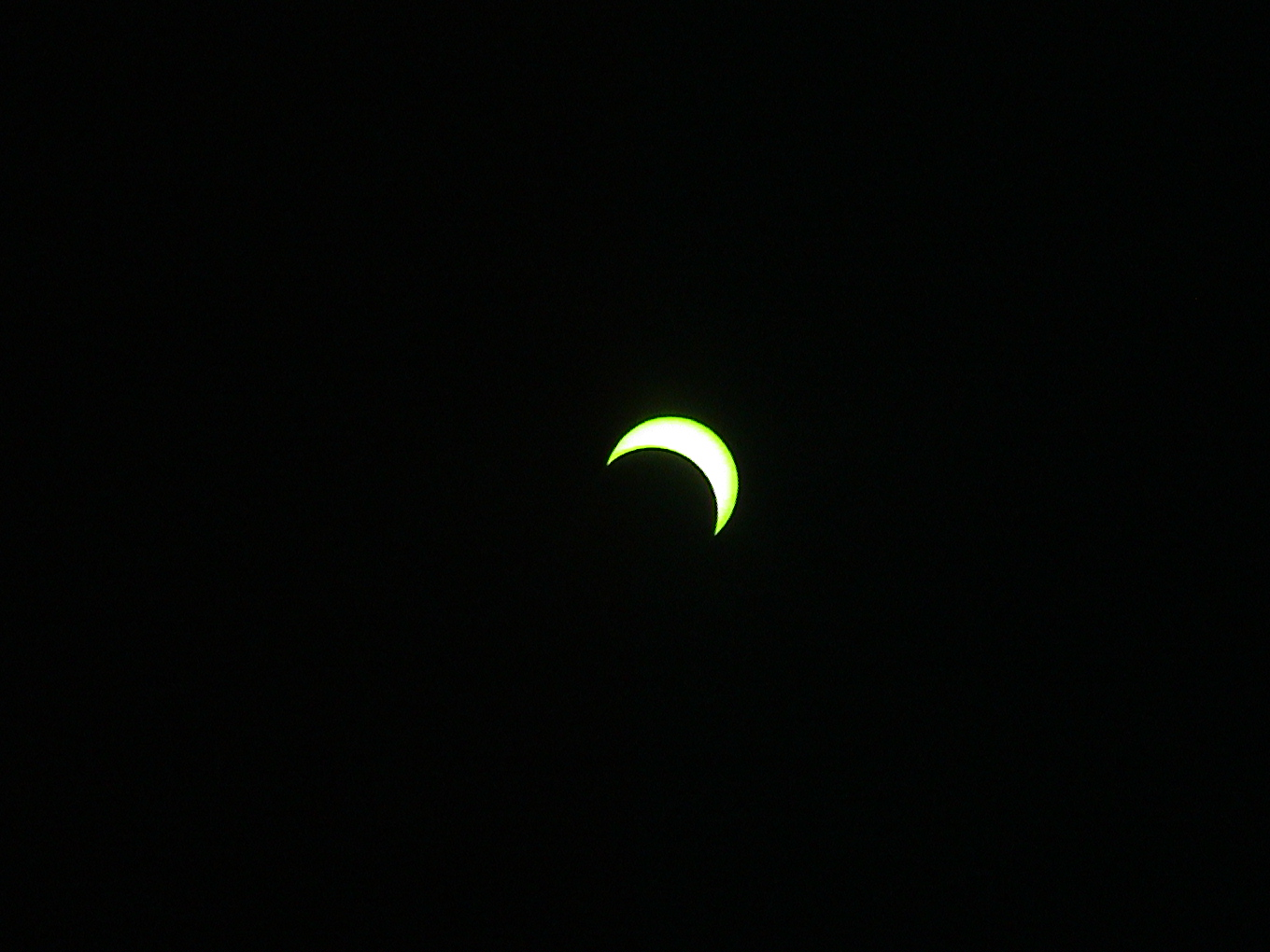
June 10, 2002 Partial from Los Angeles, California, USA Series member 35

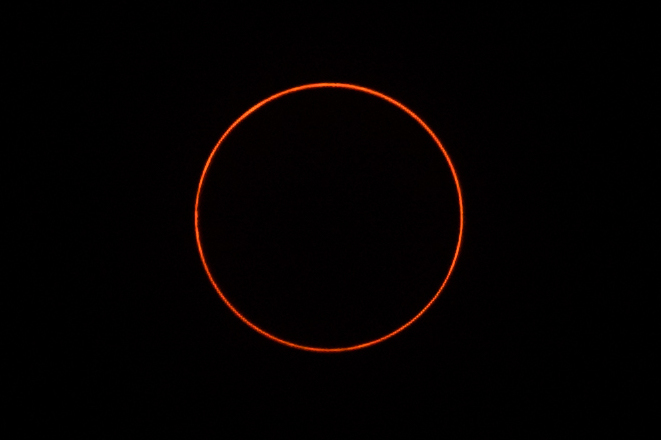
June 21, 2020 Annularity from Chiayi, Taiwan Series member 36

Historic saros cycle animation

Saros cycle series 137 for solar eclipses occurs at the Moon's ascending node. It repeats every 18 years, 11 days, and contains 70 eclipses, 55 of which are umbral eclipses. The first eclipse in the series was on 25 May 1389 and the last will be on 28 June 2633. The most recent eclipse was an annular eclipse on 21 June 2020 and the next will be an annular eclipse on 2 July 2038. The longest duration of totality was 2 minutes, 55 seconds on September 10, 1569 and the longest annular eclipse will be 7 minutes 5 seconds on 28 February 2435. This series has an unusual order of umbral eclipses, with 10 total eclipses followed by 6 hybrid eclipses, 4 annular eclipses, 3 more hybrid eclipses, and then finally 32 annular eclipses.

This solar saros is linked to Lunar Saros 130.

Series members 30–46 occurring between 1901 and 2200:
30	31	32
April 17, 1912	April 28, 1930	May 9, 1948
33	34	35
May 20, 1966	May 30, 1984	June 10, 2002
36	37	38
June 21, 2020	July 2, 2038	July 12, 2056
39	40	41
July 24, 2074	August 3, 2092	August 15, 2110
42	43	44
August 25, 2128	September 6, 2146	September 16, 2164
45	46	
September 27, 2182	October 9, 2200	

== Umbral eclipses ==
Umbral eclipses (annular, total and hybrid) can be further classified as either: 1) Central (two limits), 2) Central (one limit) or 3) Non-Central (one limit). The statistical distribution of these classes in Saros series 137 appears in the following table.

Classification	Number	Percent
All Umbral eclipses	55	100.00%
Central (two limits)	54	98.18%
Central (one limit)	0	0.00%
Non-central (one limit)	1	1.82%

== All eclipses ==
Note: Dates are given in the Julian calendar prior to 15 October 1582, and in the Gregorian calendar after that.

Saros	Member	Date	Time (Greatest) UTC	Type	Location Lat, Long	Gamma	Mag.	Width (km)	Duration (min:sec)	Ref
137	1	May 25, 1389	16:48:11	Partial	64.4N 139.8E	1.4993	0.0549			
137	2	June 6, 1407	0:16:35	Partial	65.2N 17.8E	1.4296	0.1902			
137	3	June 16, 1425	7:44:06	Partial	66.2N 104.4W	1.3592	0.3271			
137	4	June 27, 1443	15:11:10	Partial	67.2N 133.2E	1.2887	0.464			
137	5	July 7, 1461	22:39:29	Partial	68.2N 10E	1.2191	0.5989			
137	6	July 19, 1479	6:09:16	Partial	69.1N 114.1W	1.1509	0.7302			
137	7	July 29, 1497	13:43:13	Partial	70N 120.2E	1.0863	0.8539			
137	8	August 9, 1515	21:21:25	Partial	70.8N 7.1W	1.0258	0.9686			
137	9	August 20, 1533	5:04:01	Total	73.7N 178.3E	0.9693	1.0479	678	2m 40s	
137	10	August 31, 1551	12:53:01	Total	65.7N 28.4E	0.9185	1.046	391	2m 52s	
137	11	September 10, 1569	20:48:16	Total	57.4N 103.4W	0.8732	1.0428	293	2m 55s	
137	12	October 2, 1587	4:51:25	Total	50N 128.3E	0.8352	1.0387	235	2m 51s	
137	13	October 12, 1605	12:59:58	Total	43.4N 0.6E	0.8022	1.0344	193	2m 43s	
137	14	October 23, 1623	21:17:10	Total	37.8N 128W	0.777	1.0298	159	2m 31s	
137	15	November 3, 1641	5:40:09	Total	33N 102.5E	0.757	1.0252	130	2m 15s	
137	16	November 14, 1659	14:10:08	Total	29.2N 28.2W	0.7432	1.0208	106	1m 56s	
137	17	November 24, 1677	22:44:03	Total	26.3N 159.6W	0.7332	1.0166	84	1m 36s	
137	18	December 6, 1695	7:23:18	Total	24.3N 67.9E	0.728	1.0128	64	1m 16s	
137	19	December 17, 1713	16:04:20	Hybrid	23.1N 64.8W	0.7249	1.0094	47	0m 56s	
137	20	December 29, 1731	0:46:53	Hybrid	22.7N 162.2E	0.7234	1.0065	32	0m 39s	
137	21	January 8, 1750	9:28:43	Hybrid	23N 29.3E	0.7217	1.0041	20	0m 24s	
137	22	January 19, 1768	18:09:29	Hybrid	23.9N 103.2W	0.7195	1.0022	11	0m 13s	
137	23	January 30, 1786	2:45:26	Hybrid	25.1N 125.5E	0.714	1.0009	5	0m 5s	
137	24	February 11, 1804	11:16:33	Hybrid	26.7N 4.5W	0.7053	1	0	0m 0s	
137	25	February 21, 1822	19:40:40	Annular	28.6N 132.3W	0.6914	0.9996	2	0m 2s	
137	26	March 4, 1840	3:58:22	Annular	30.6N 101.7E	0.6728	0.9995	2	0m 3s	
137	27	March 15, 1858	12:05:28	Annular	32.7N 20.9W	0.6461	0.9996	2	0m 2s	
137	28	March 25, 1876	20:05:06	Annular	34.8N 141.1W	0.6142	0.9999	0.5	0m 1s	
137	29	April 6, 1894	3:53:41	Hybrid	36.7N 102.4E	0.574	1.0001	1	0m 1s	
137	30	April 17, 1912	11:34:22	Hybrid	38.4N 11.3W	0.528	1.0003	1.3	0m 2s	
137	31	April 28, 1930	19:03:34	Hybrid	39.4N 121.2W	0.473	1.0003	1.0	0m 1s	
137	32	May 9, 1948	2:26:04	Annular	39.8N 131.2E	0.41332	0.99994	0.2	0m 0.3s	
137	33	May 20, 1966	9:39:02	Annular	39.2N 26.4E	0.34672	0.99915	3.2	0m 4.65s	
137	34	May 30, 1984	16:45:41	Annular	37.5N 76.7W	0.2755	0.998	7	0m 11s	
137	35	June 10, 2002	23:45:22	Annular	34.5N 178.6W	0.1993	0.9962	13	0m 23s	
137	36	June 21, 2020	6:41:15	Annular	30.5N 79.7E	0.1209	0.994	21	0m 38s	
137	37	July 2, 2038	13:32:55	Annular	25.4N 21.9W	0.0398	0.9911	31	1m 0s	
137	38	July 12, 2056	20:21:59	Annular	19.4N 123.7W	-0.0426	0.9878	43	1m 26s	
137	39	July 24, 2074	3:10:32	Annular	12.8N 133.7E	-0.1242	0.9838	58	1m 57s	
137	40	August 3, 2092	9:59:33	Annular	5.6N 30.3E	-0.2044	0.9794	75	2m 31s	
137	41	August 15, 2110	16:50:45	Annular	2S 74.3W	-0.2819	0.9746	94	3m 7s	
137	42	August 25, 2128	23:44:34	Annular	9.8S 180E	-0.3562	0.9694	117	3m 41s	
137	43	September 6, 2146	6:44:00	Annular	17.8S 72.6E	-0.4249	0.9639	143	4m 13s	
137	44	September 16, 2164	13:48:20	Annular	25.7S 36.3W	-0.4885	0.9583	172	4m 42s	
137	45	September 27, 2182	20:58:45	Annular	33.5S 146.7W	-0.5461	0.9527	205	5m 5s	
137	46	October 9, 2200	4:16:21	Annular	41.1S 101.3E	-0.5972	0.947	241	5m 25s	
137	47	October 20, 2218	11:41:56	Annular	48.4S 12.1W	-0.6411	0.9416	280	5m 41s	
137	48	October 30, 2236	19:15:15	Annular	55.2S 126.4W	-0.6779	0.9365	321	5m 54s	
137	49	November 11, 2254	2:55:16	Annular	61.4S 119.3E	-0.7086	0.9317	363	6m 5s	
137	50	November 21, 2272	10:42:52	Annular	66.8S 5.9E	-0.7327	0.9275	402	6m 15s	
137	51	December 2, 2290	18:36:41	Annular	70.9S 104.7W	-0.7515	0.9237	439	6m 23s	
137	52	December 14, 2308	2:34:52	Annular	73.4S 148.6E	-0.7662	0.9207	470	6m 31s	
137	53	December 25, 2326	10:36:53	Annular	73.6S 43.3E	-0.7774	0.9182	496	6m 39s	
137	54	January 4, 2345	18:40:23	Annular	71.9S 64.6W	-0.7872	0.9165	517	6m 45s	
137	55	January 16, 2363	2:45:07	Annular	68.8S 177.6W	-0.7955	0.9154	532	6m 52s	
137	56	January 26, 2381	10:46:38	Annular	65.3S 66.8E	-0.8064	0.9149	546	6m 57s	
137	57	February 6, 2399	18:46:44	Annular	61.6S 51W	-0.818	0.915	557	7m 1s	
137	58	February 17, 2417	2:40:42	Annular	58.3S 168.3W	-0.8345	0.9155	574	7m 4s	
137	59	February 28, 2435	10:29:45	Annular	55.4S 75E	-0.8546	0.9165	599	7m 5s	
137	60	March 10, 2453	18:09:42	Annular	53.6S 39.1W	-0.882	0.9177	647	7m 4s	
137	61	March 22, 2471	1:43:37	Annular	52.9S 151.3W	-0.9141	0.919	738	7m 0s	
137	62	April 1, 2489	9:07:55	Annular	54.4S 101.3E	-0.9541	0.92	997	6m 50s	
137	63	April 13, 2507	16:23:43	Annular (Note: Non-central)	61.3S 13.5E	1.0006	0.9539	-	-	
137	64	April 23, 2525	23:30:15	Partial	61.8S 101.6W	-1.0544	0.8646			
137	65	May 5, 2543	6:29:19	Partial	62.3S 145.1E	-1.114	0.7648			
137	66	May 15, 2561	13:20:16	Partial	63.1S 33.6E	-1.1801	0.6534			
137	67	May 26, 2579	20:04:28	Partial	63.9S 76.4W	-1.2516	0.532			
137	68	June 6, 2597	2:43:07	Partial	64.8S 174.7E	-1.3272	0.4029			
137	69	June 18, 2615	9:17:56	Partial	65.7S 66.4E	-1.4053	0.2689			
137	70	June 28, 2633	15:48:41	Partial	66.7S 41.2W	-1.4864	0.1291			
