= July 2018 lunar eclipse =

Central lunar eclipse on 27 July 2018

- Total eclipse
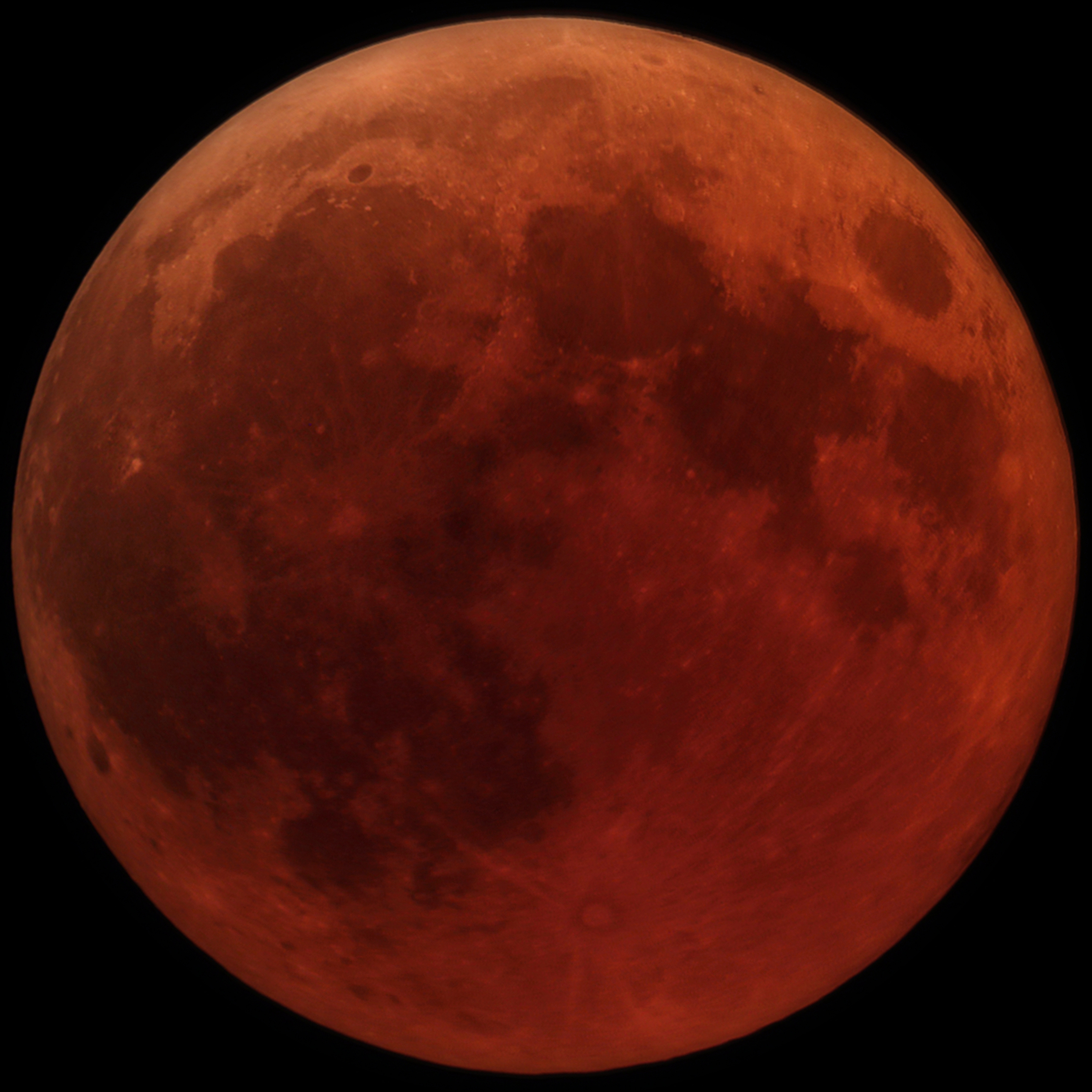
- Totality as viewed from Oria, Italy, 21:09 UTC
- Date: July 27, 2018
- Gamma: 0.1168
- Magnitude: 1.6100
- Saros cycle: 129 (38 of 71)
- Totality: 102 minutes, 57 seconds
- Partiality: 234 minutes, 33 seconds
- Penumbral: 373 minutes, 48 seconds
Contacts (UTC)
- P1: 17:14:49
- U1: 18:24:27
- U2: 19:30:15
- Greatest: 20:21:44
- U3: 21:13:12
- U4: 22:19:00
- P4: 23:28:37

A total lunar eclipse occurred at the Moon’s descending node of orbit on Friday, July 27, 2018, with an umbral magnitude of 1.6100. It was a central lunar eclipse, in which part of the Moon passed through the center of the Earth's shadow. A lunar eclipse occurs when the Moon moves into the Earth's shadow, causing the Moon to be darkened. A total lunar eclipse occurs when the Moon's near side entirely passes into the Earth's umbral shadow. Unlike a solar eclipse, which can only be viewed from a relatively small area of the world, a lunar eclipse may be viewed from anywhere on the night side of Earth. A total lunar eclipse can last up to nearly two hours, while a total solar eclipse lasts only a few minutes at any given place, because the Moon's shadow is smaller. Occurring about 19 hours after apogee (on July 27, 2018, at 1:45 UTC), the Moon's apparent diameter was smaller.

This was the first central lunar eclipse since June 15, 2011. It was also the longest total lunar eclipse of the 21st century, but not the longest in the 3rd millennium. Totality lasted one hour and 42.955 minutes, a period "just short of the theoretical limit of a lunar eclipse (one hour and 46.605 minutes)". The Moon remained at least partially in Earth's shadow for three hours 54.55 minutes. The longest total lunar eclipse of the 3rd millennium will occur on May 12, 2264, lasting 106 minutes and 13.2 seconds, which will be the longest total lunar eclipse since 2000, and the longest one until 3107.

The eclipse occurred when the Moon was near its maximum distance from Earth, which caused the Moon to appear smaller than normal (a phenomenon sometimes called a micromoon), and to travel at its slowest speed in its orbit around Earth.

This lunar eclipse coincided with Mars being nearly as close as possible to Earth, a concurrence that happens once every 25,000 years.

== Background ==
A lunar eclipse occurs when the Moon passes within Earth's umbra (shadow). As the eclipse begins, Earth's shadow first darkens the Moon slightly. Then, the Earth's shadow begins to cover part of the Moon, typically turning it a dark red-brown color (the color can vary based on atmospheric conditions). The Moon appears to be reddish because of Rayleigh scattering (the same effect that causes sunsets to appear reddish and the daytime sky to appear blue) and the refraction of that light by Earth's atmosphere into its umbra.

The Moon's brightness is exaggerated within the umbral shadow. The southern portion of the Moon was closest to the center of the shadow, making it the darkest, and most red in appearance.

Animation showing the approximate appearance of the Moon passing through Earth's shadow

== Visibility ==
The eclipse was completely visible over east Africa, southern Africa, south and central Asia, seen rising over South America, west Africa, and Europe, and setting over east Asia and Australia.

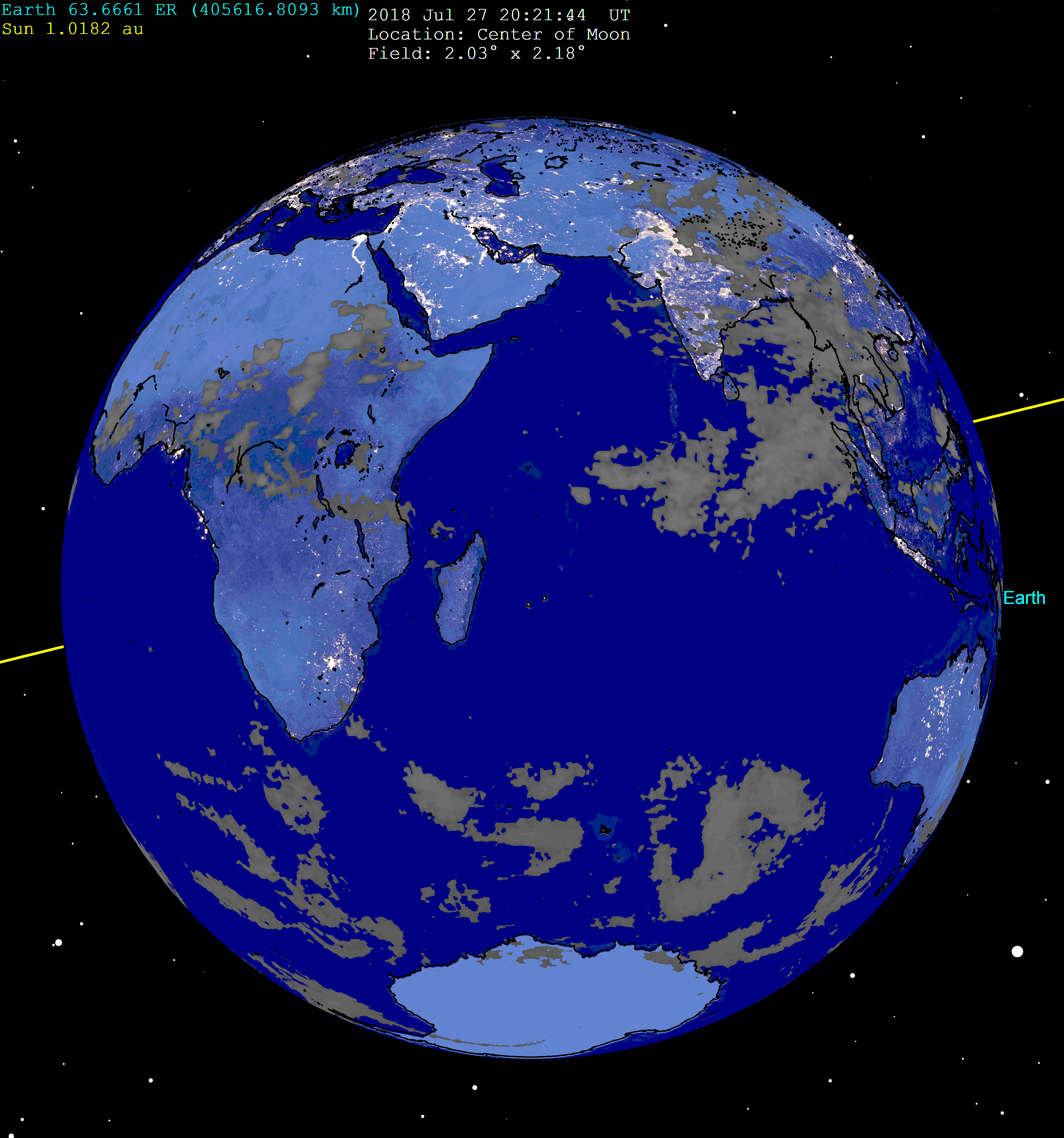
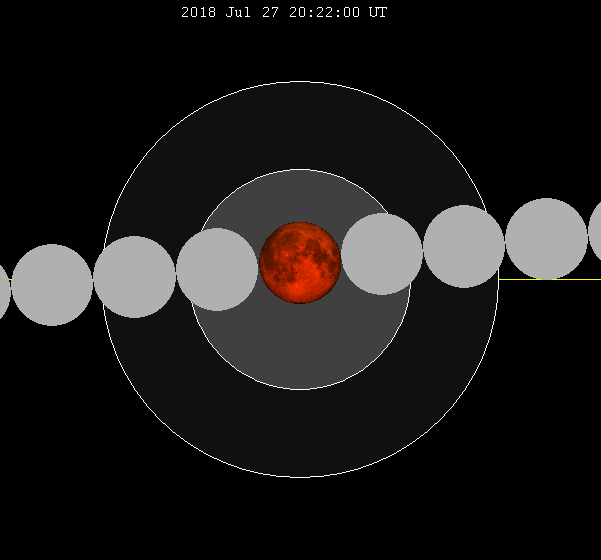
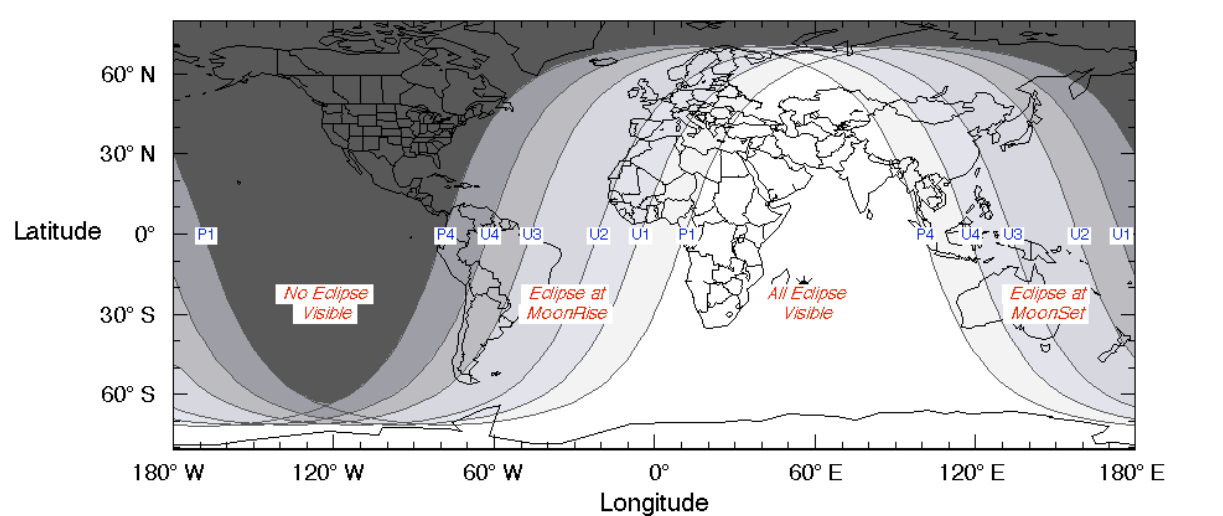
Visibility map

== Gallery ==
Animation of the eclipse from Athens, Greece

Video of the eclipse from Yekaterinburg, Russia

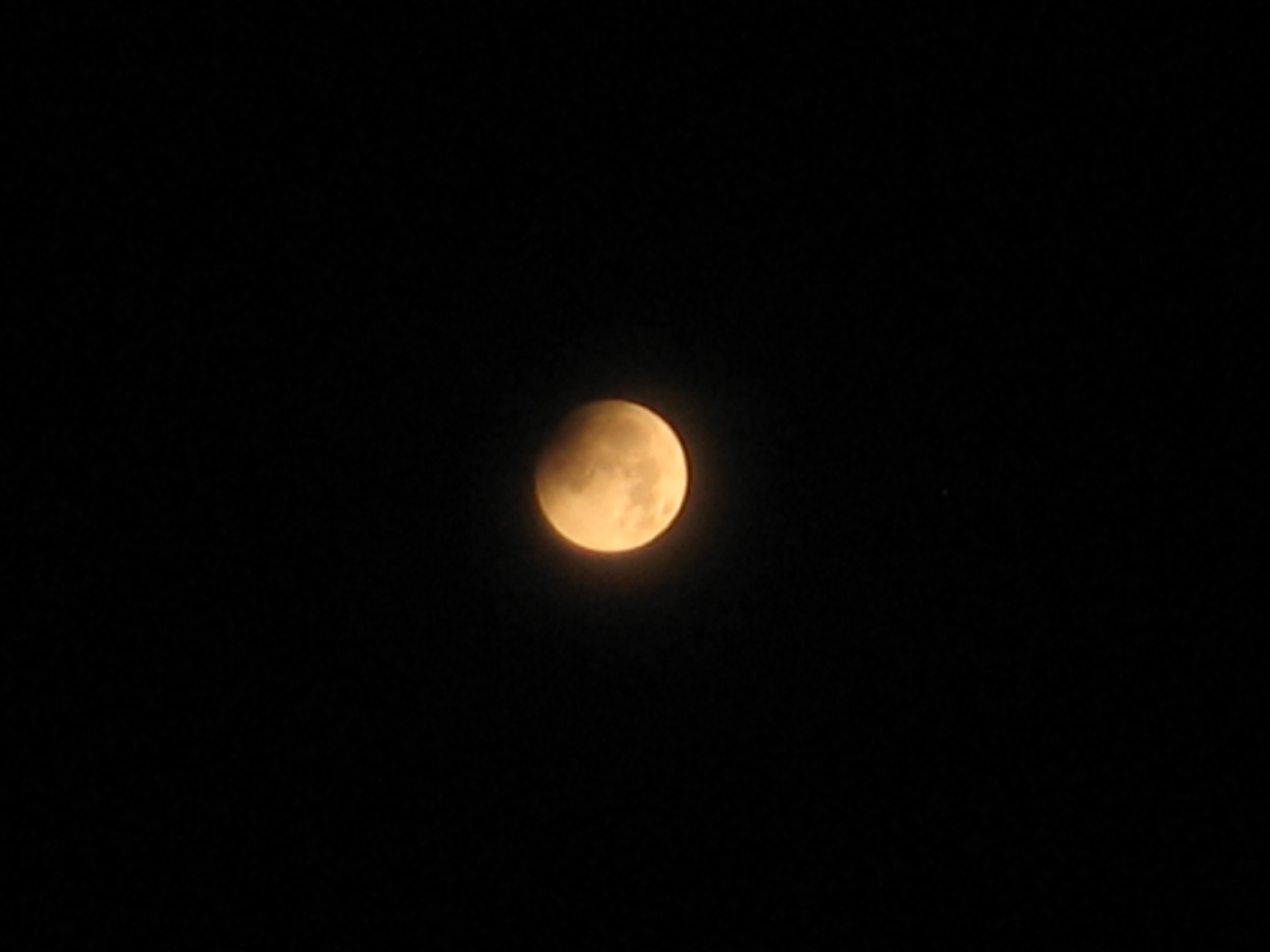
Nanjing, China, 18:25 UTC

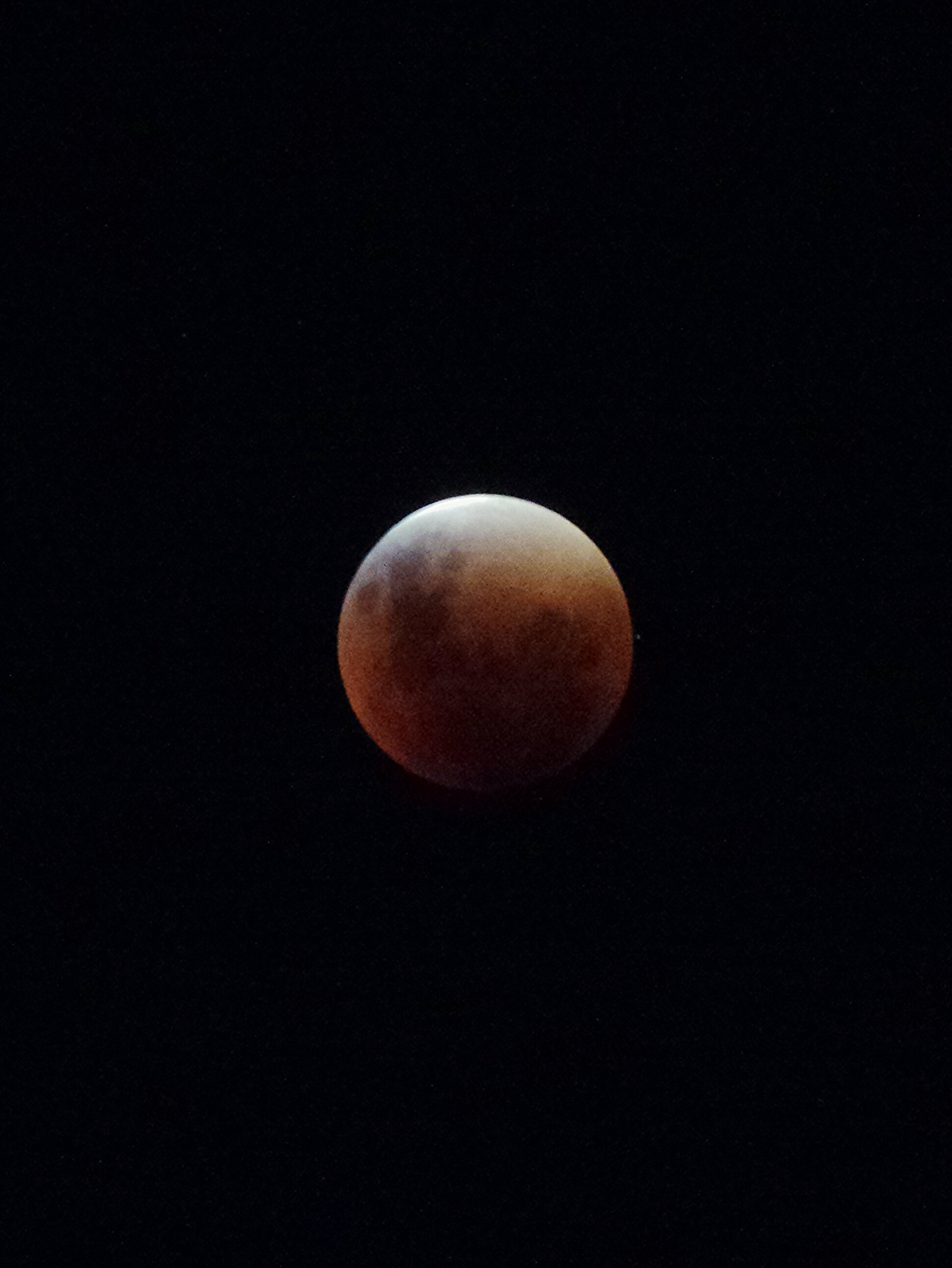
Asunción, Paraguay 19:10 UTC

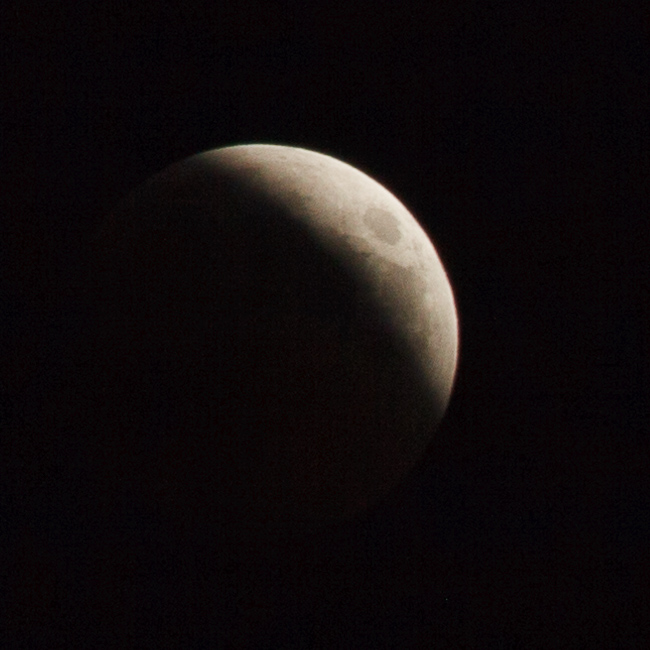
Rethymnon, Greece 19:14 UTC

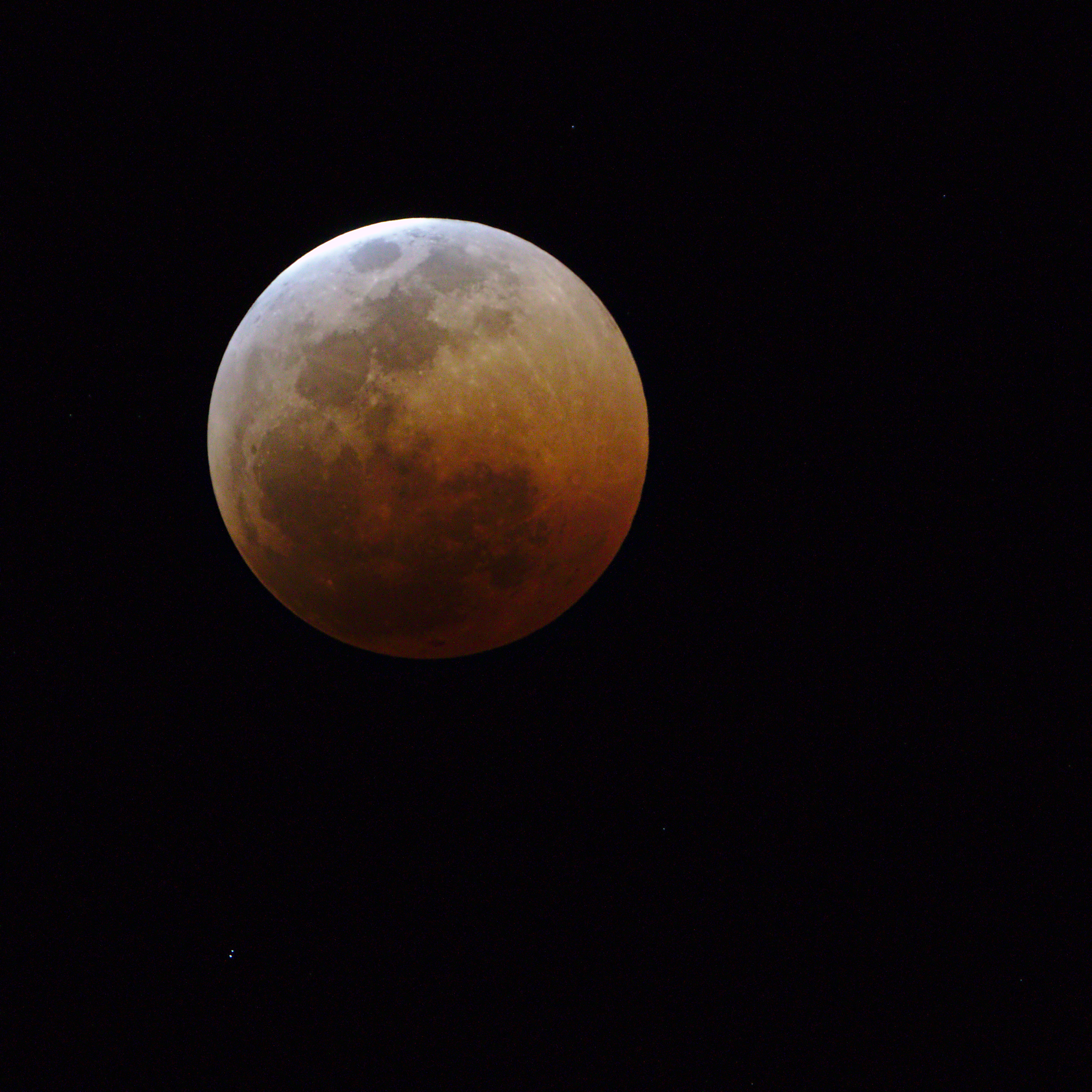
Johannesburg, South Africa, 19:16 UTC

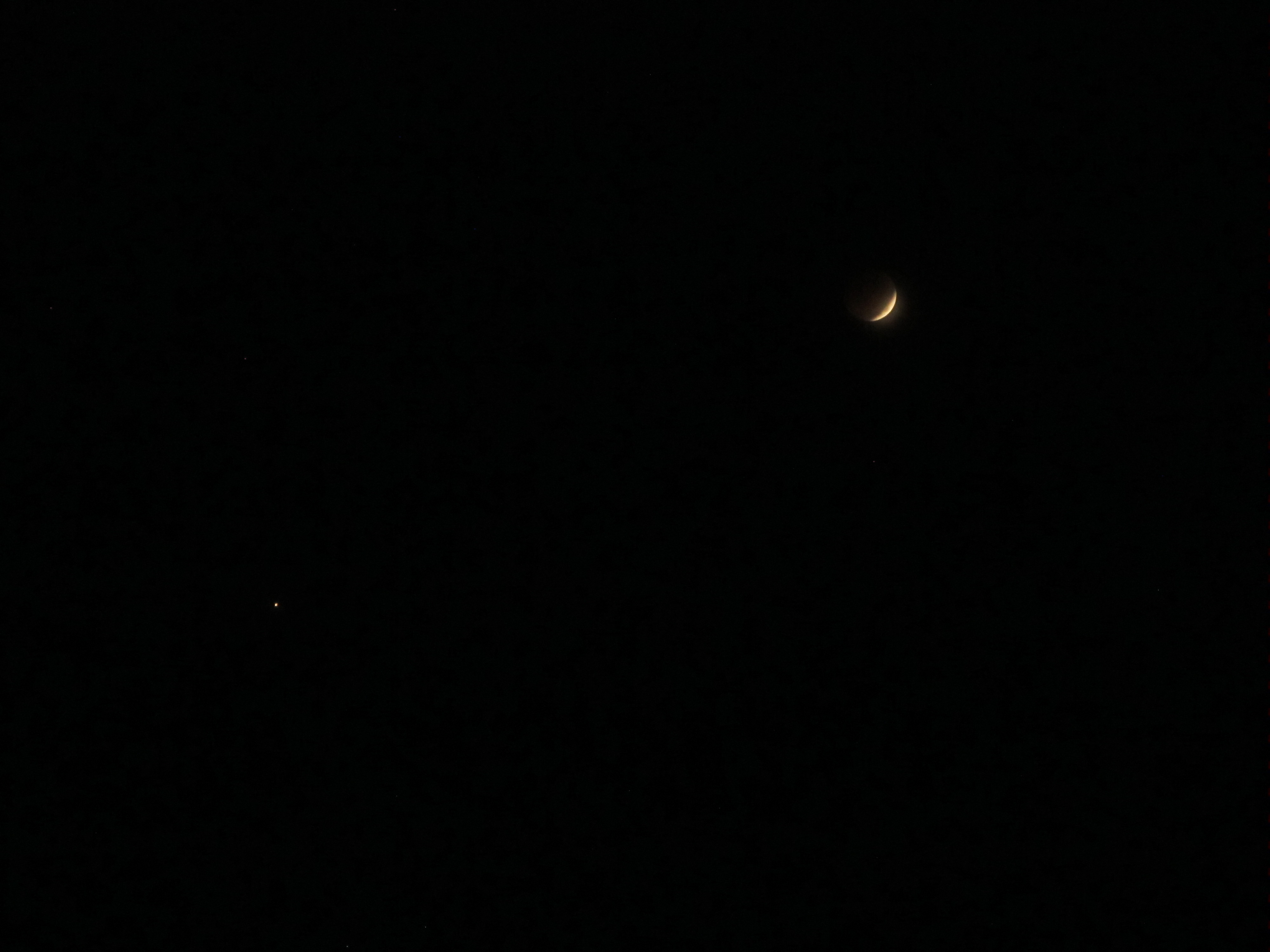
Guangzhou, China, 19:20 UTC

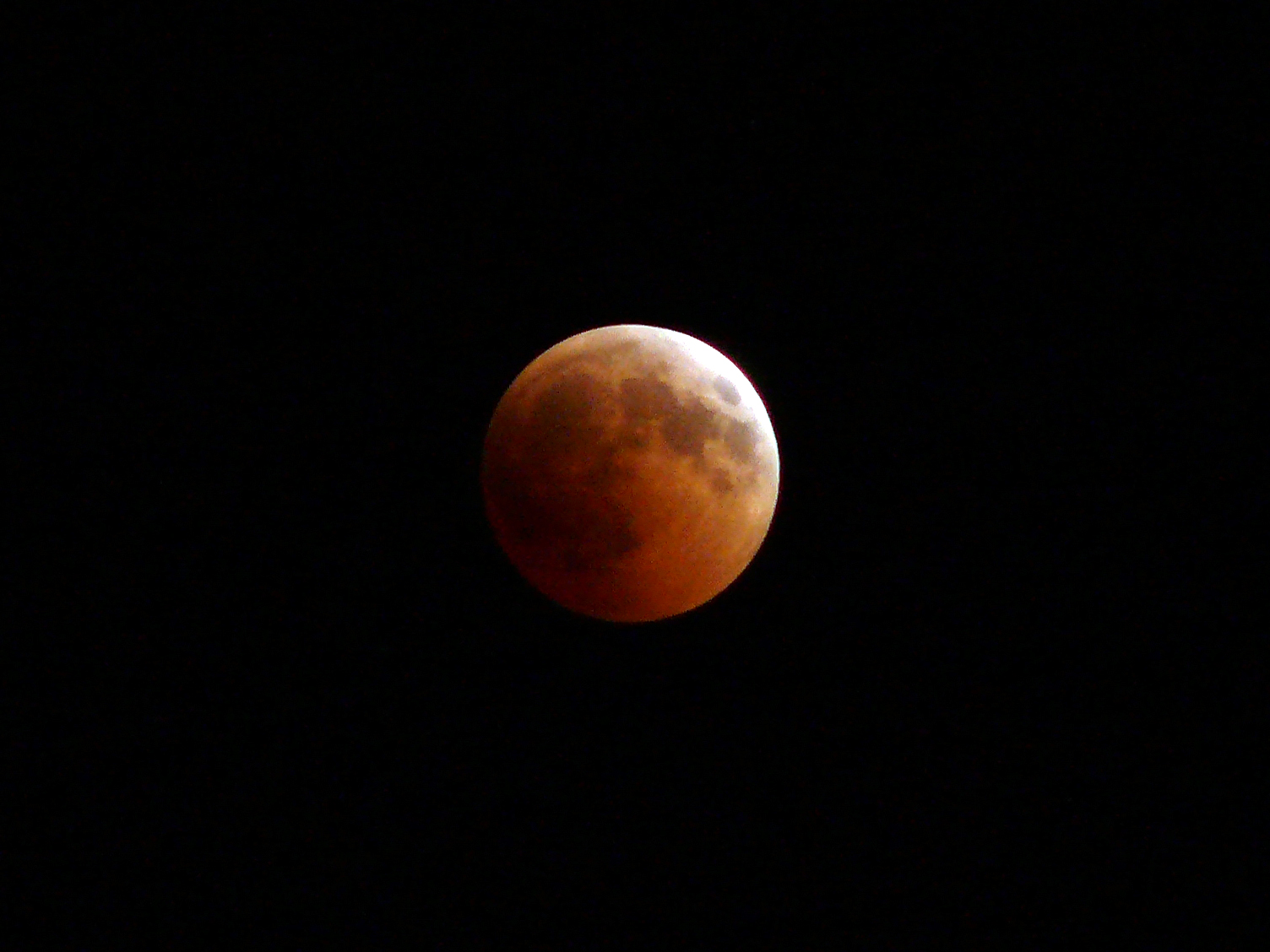
Limassol, Cyprus, 19:27 UTC

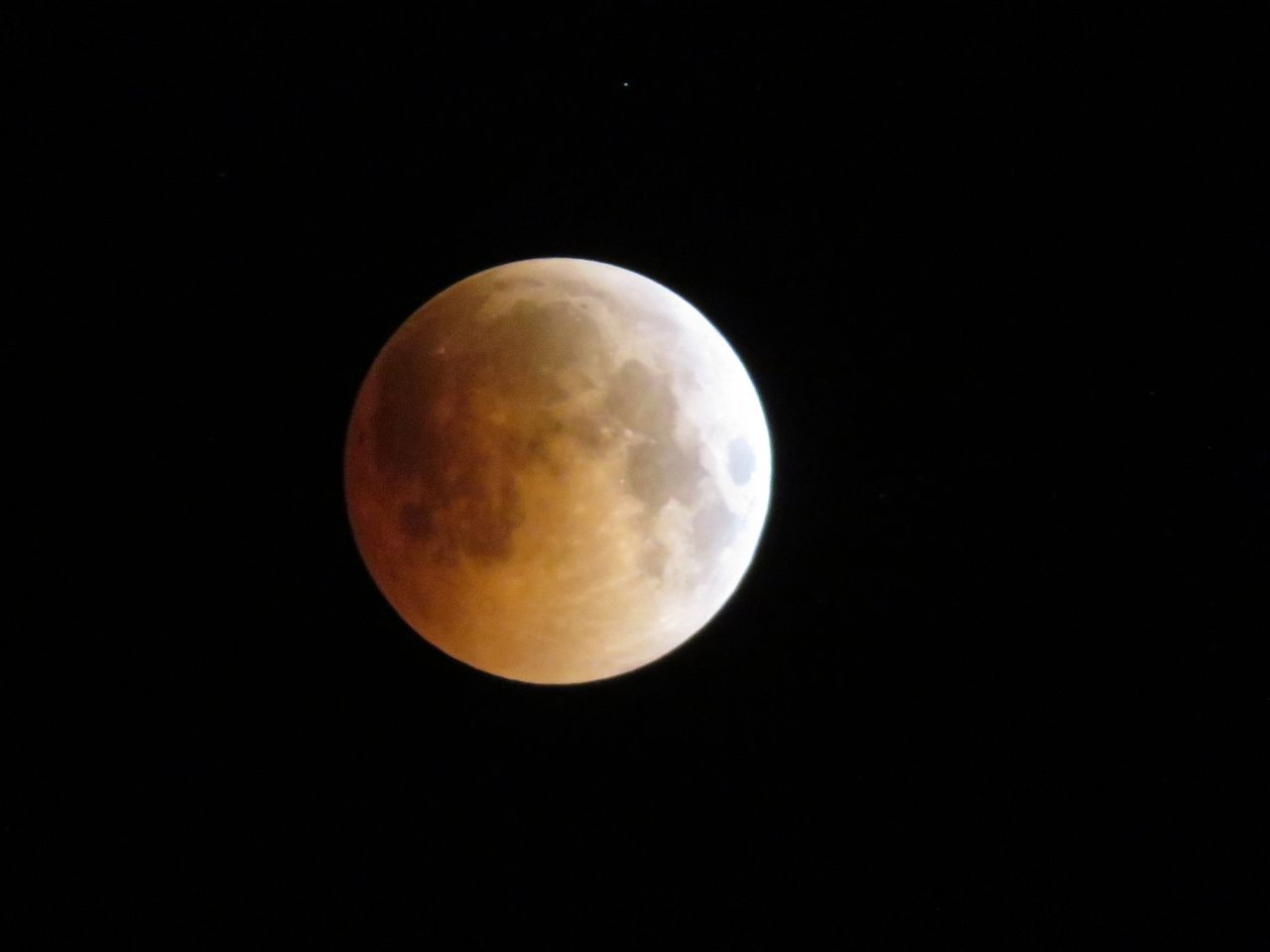
Tashkent, Uzbekistan, 19:32 UTC

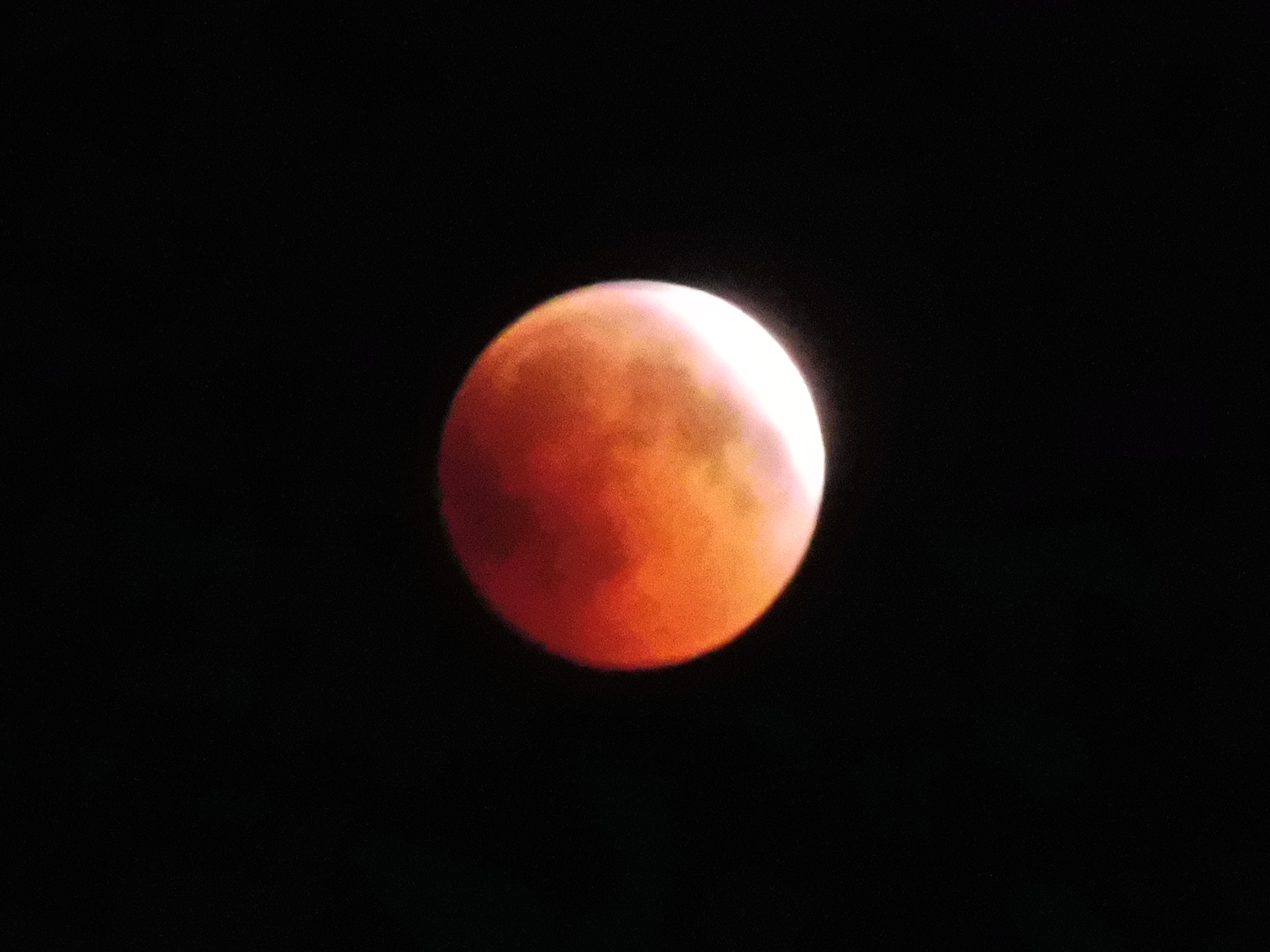
Jerusalem, Israel, 19:33 UTC

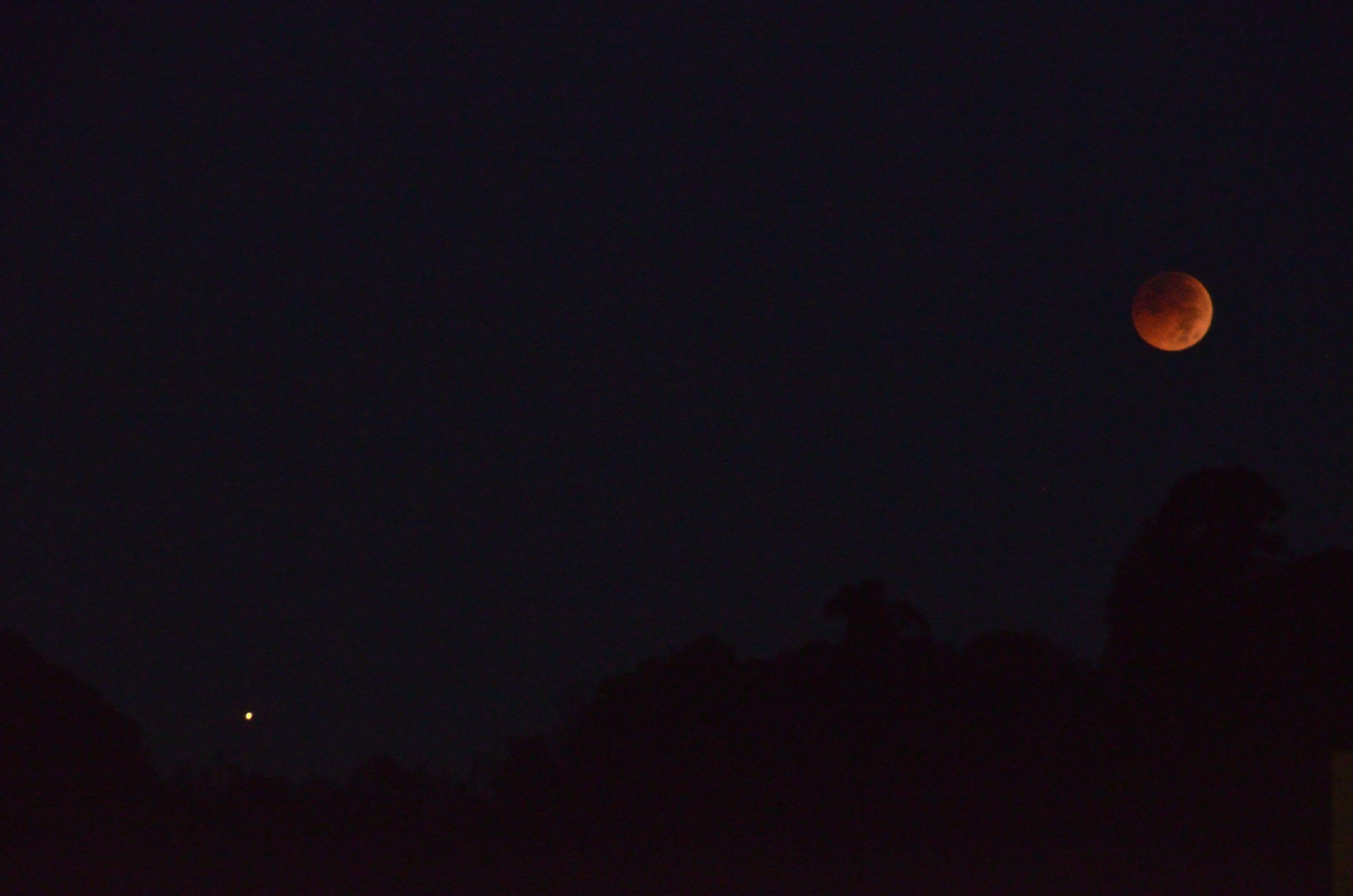
Eclipse with Mars, Fukuoka, Japan, 19:46 UTC

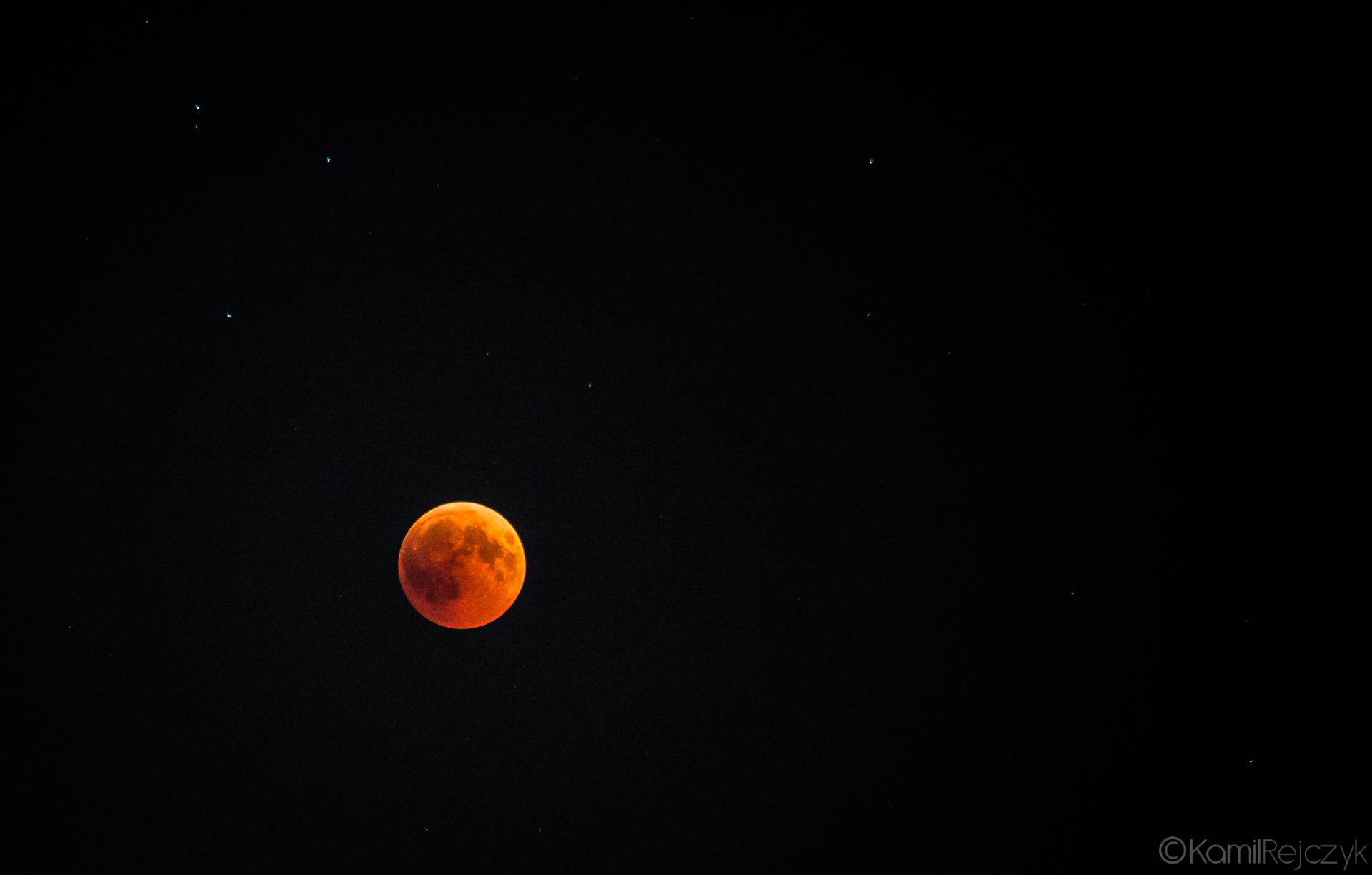
Cracow, Poland, 20:05 UTC

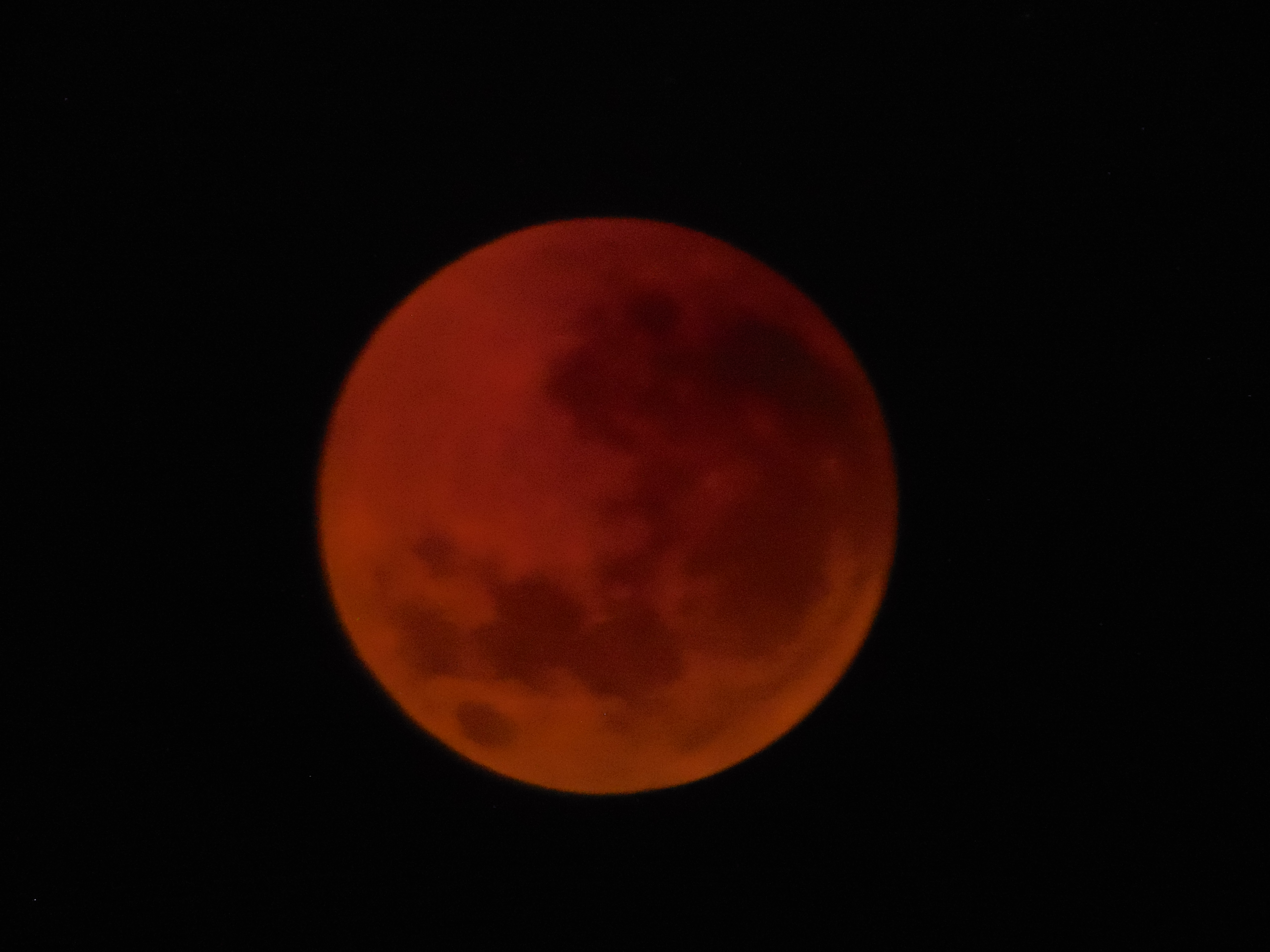
Chelsea, Victoria, Australia, 20:07 UTC

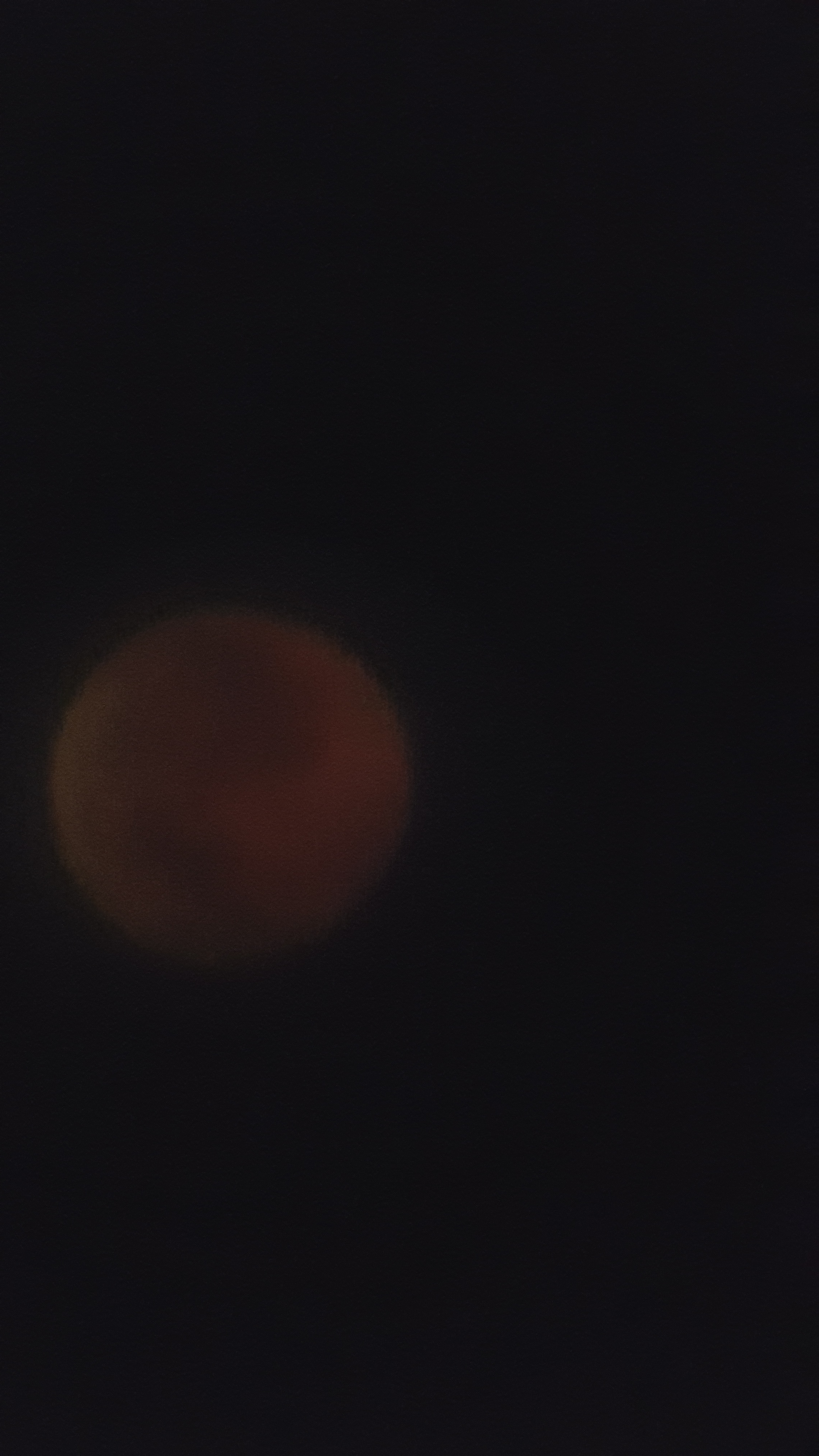
Maximum from Banjarmasin, Indonesia, 20:21 UTC

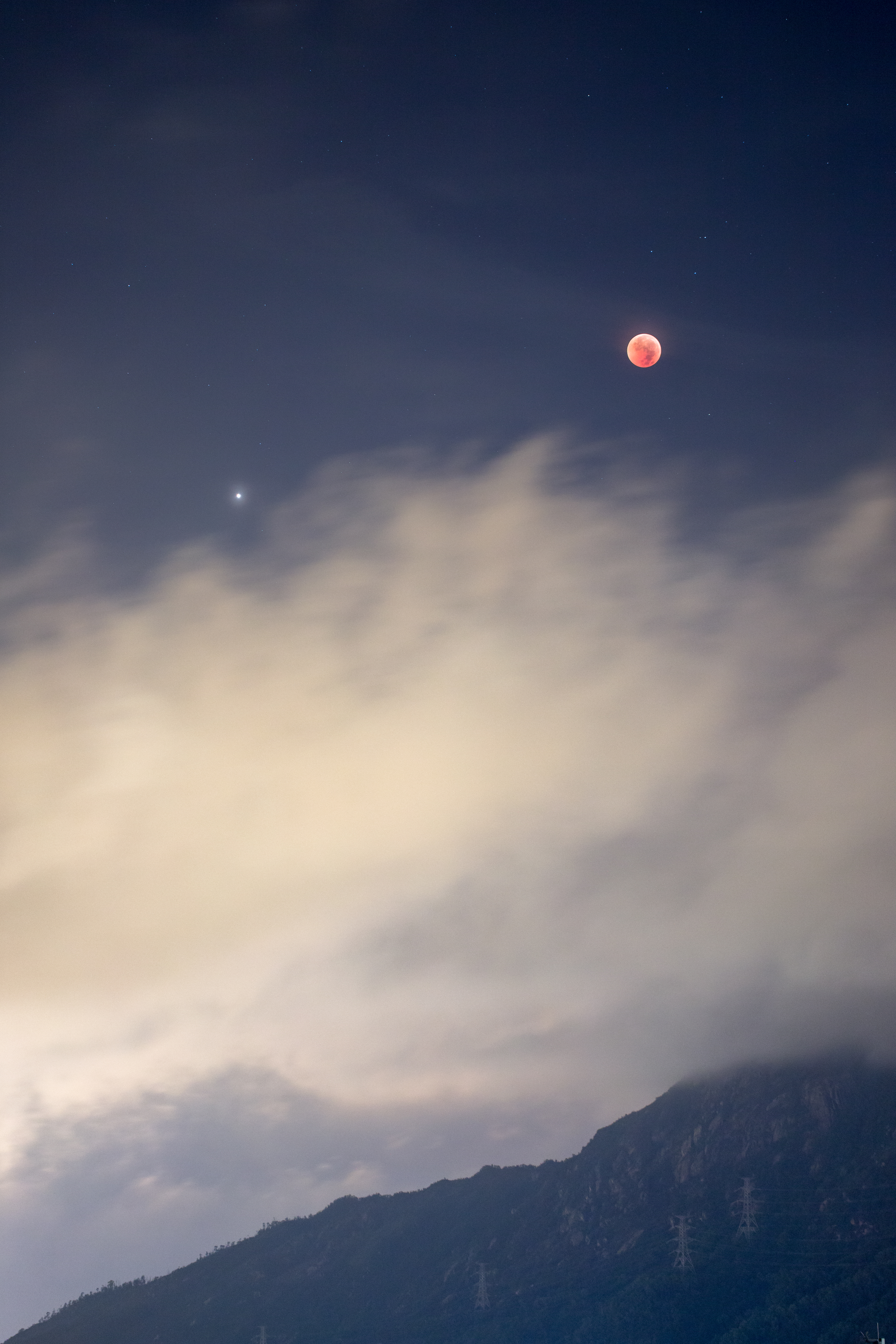
Tuen Mun, Hong Kong, 20:47 UTC

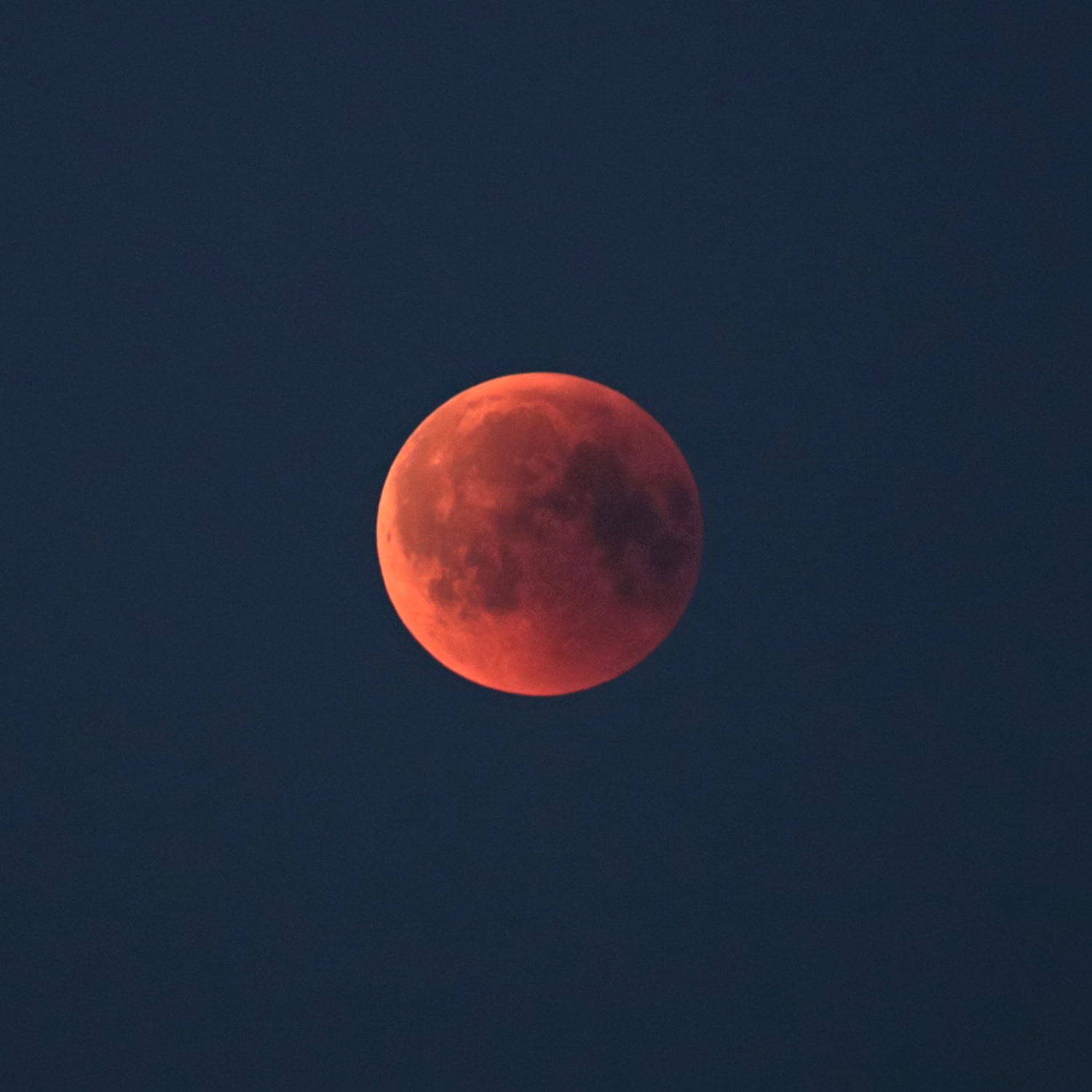
Huittinen, Finland, 21:05 UTC

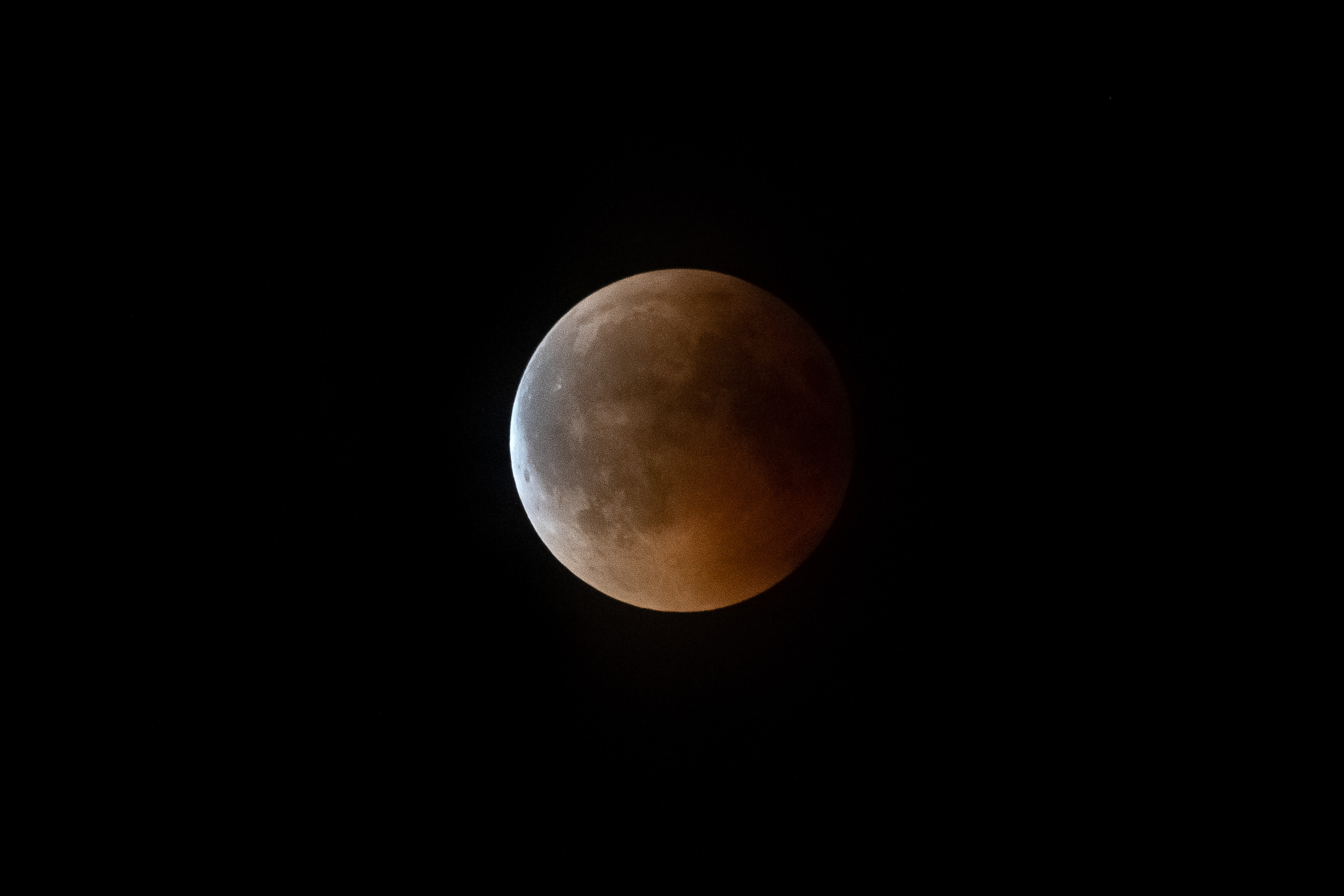
Graz, Austria, 21:12 UTC

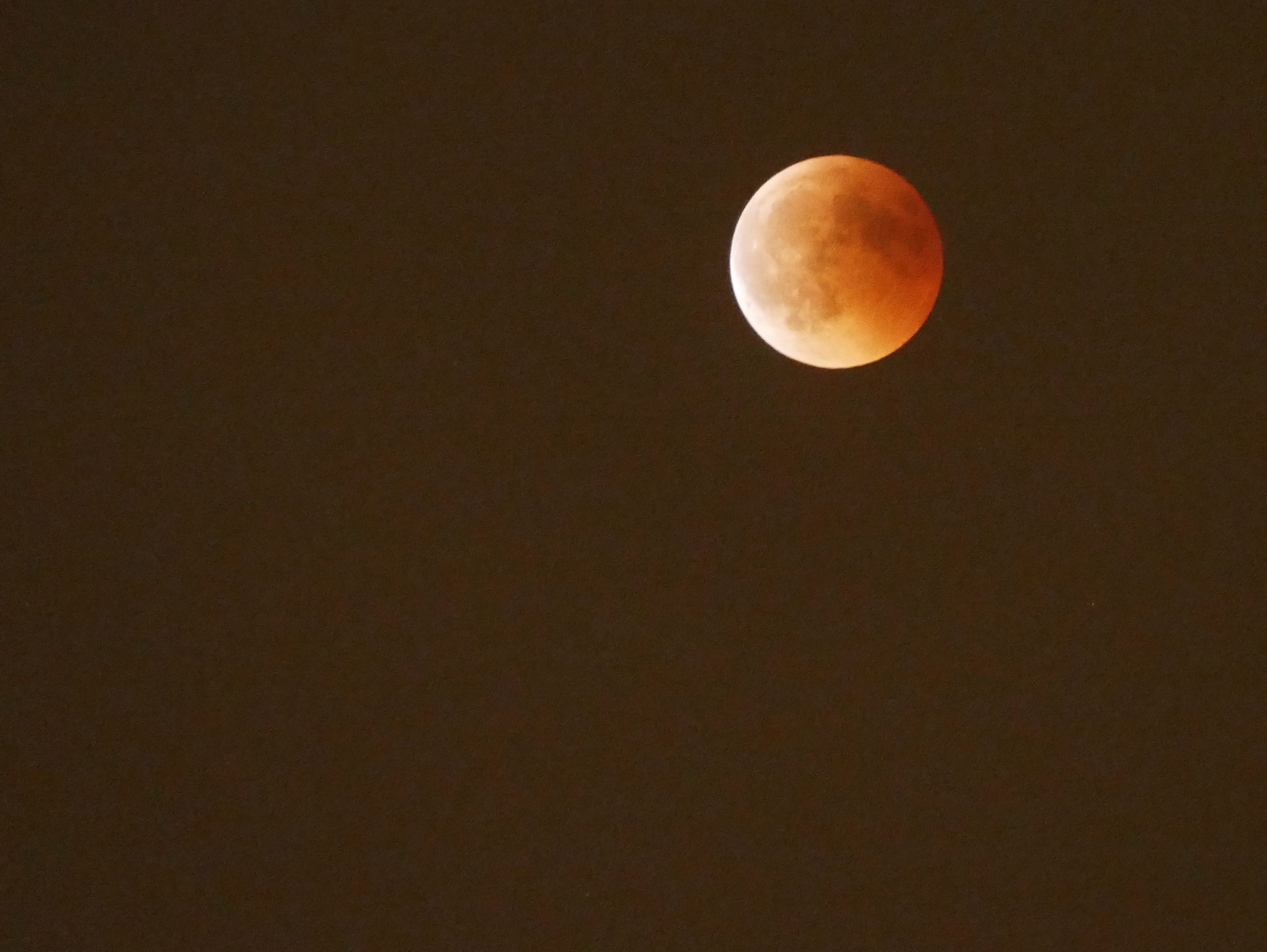
Toulouse, France, 21:17 UTC

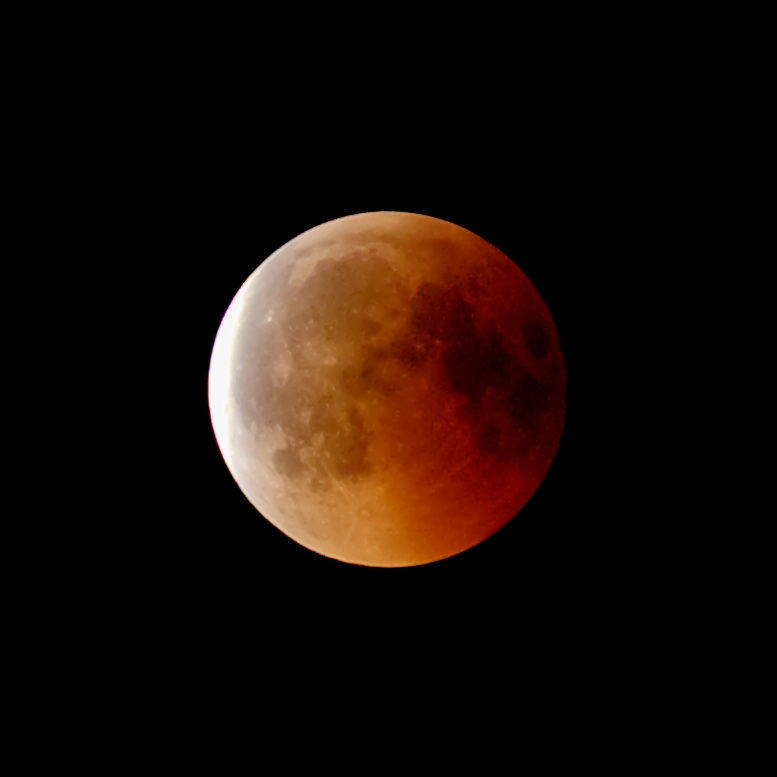
Berlin, Germany, 21:19 UTC

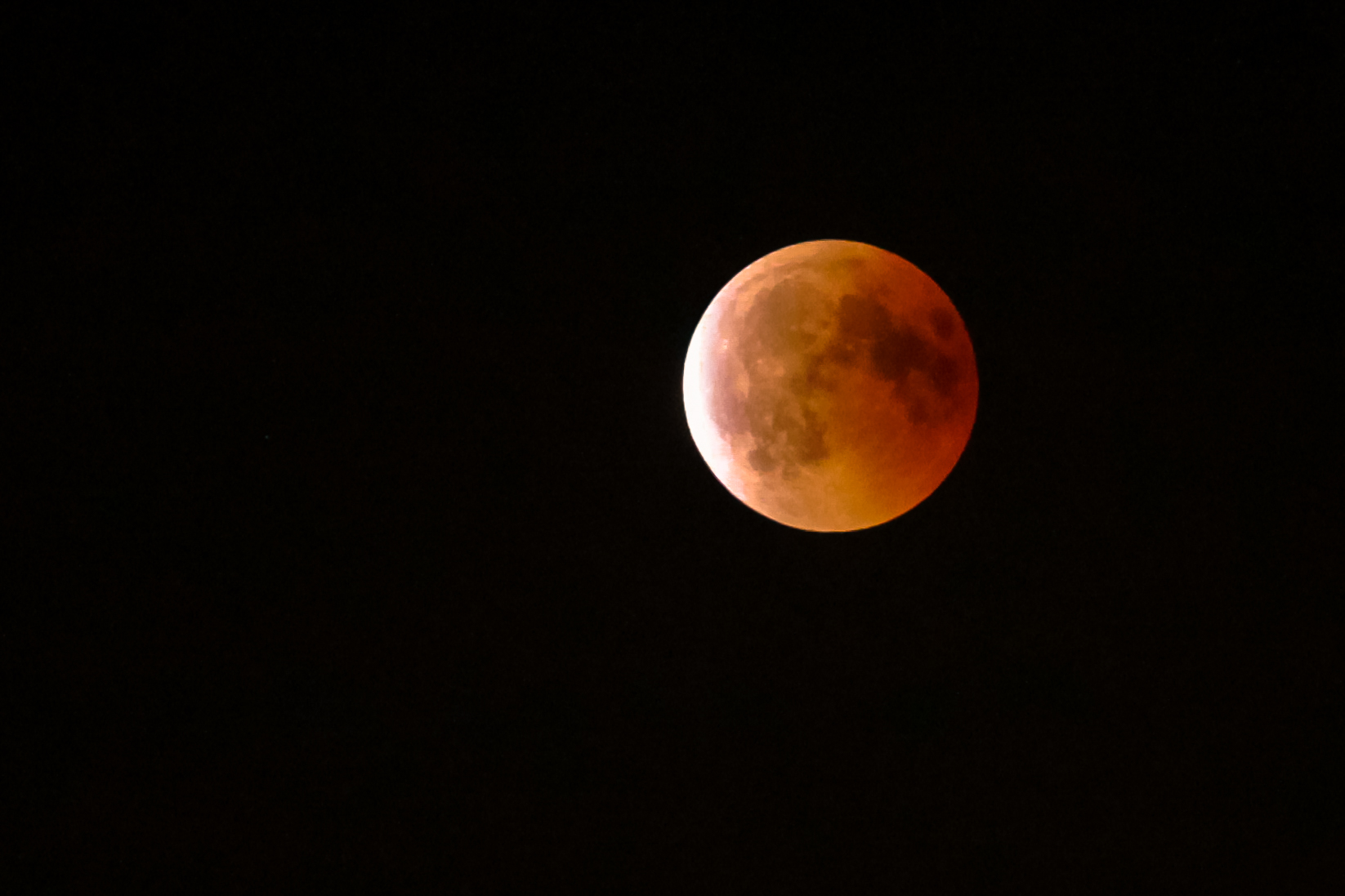
Torino, Italy, 21:19 UTC

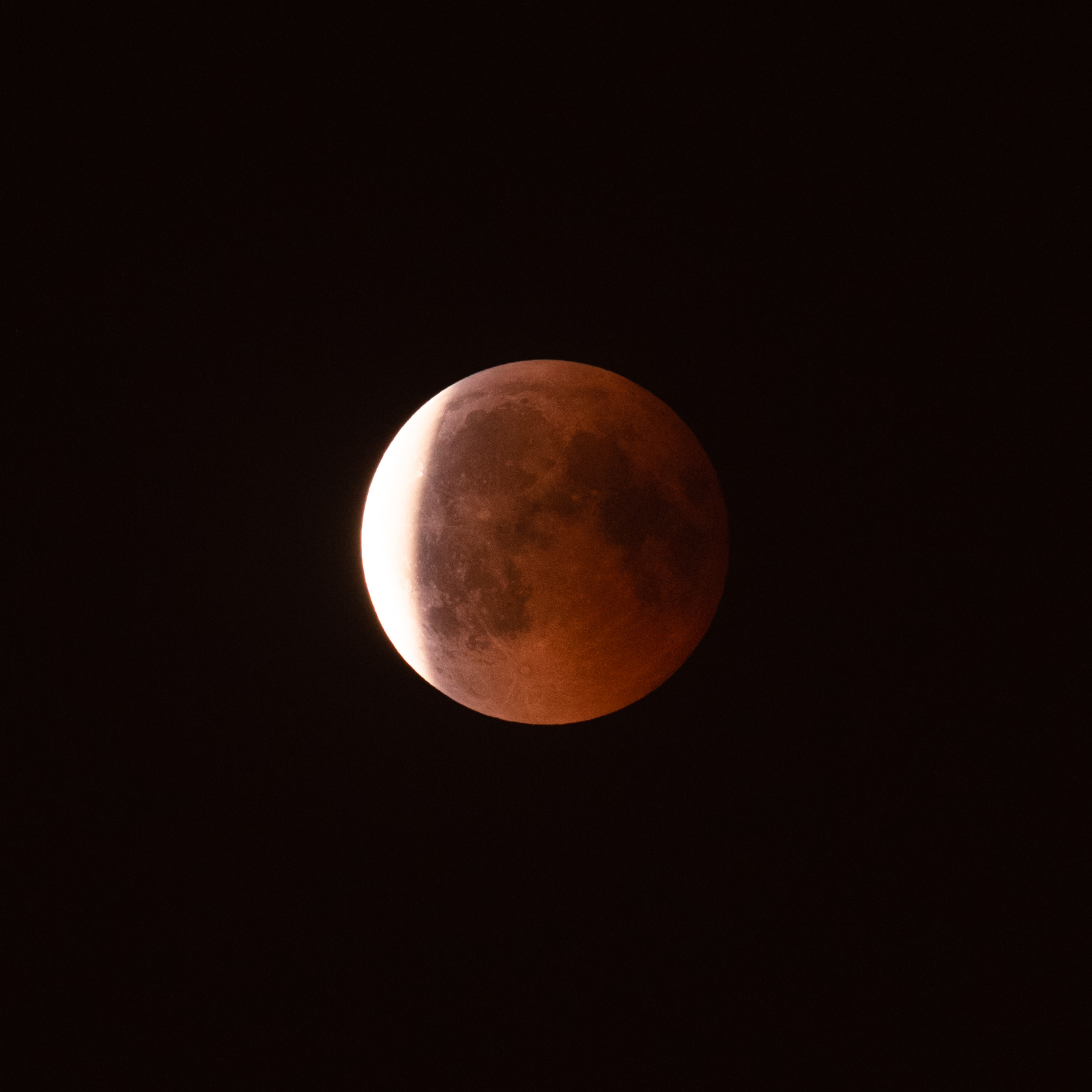
Hamburg, Germany, 21:23 UTC

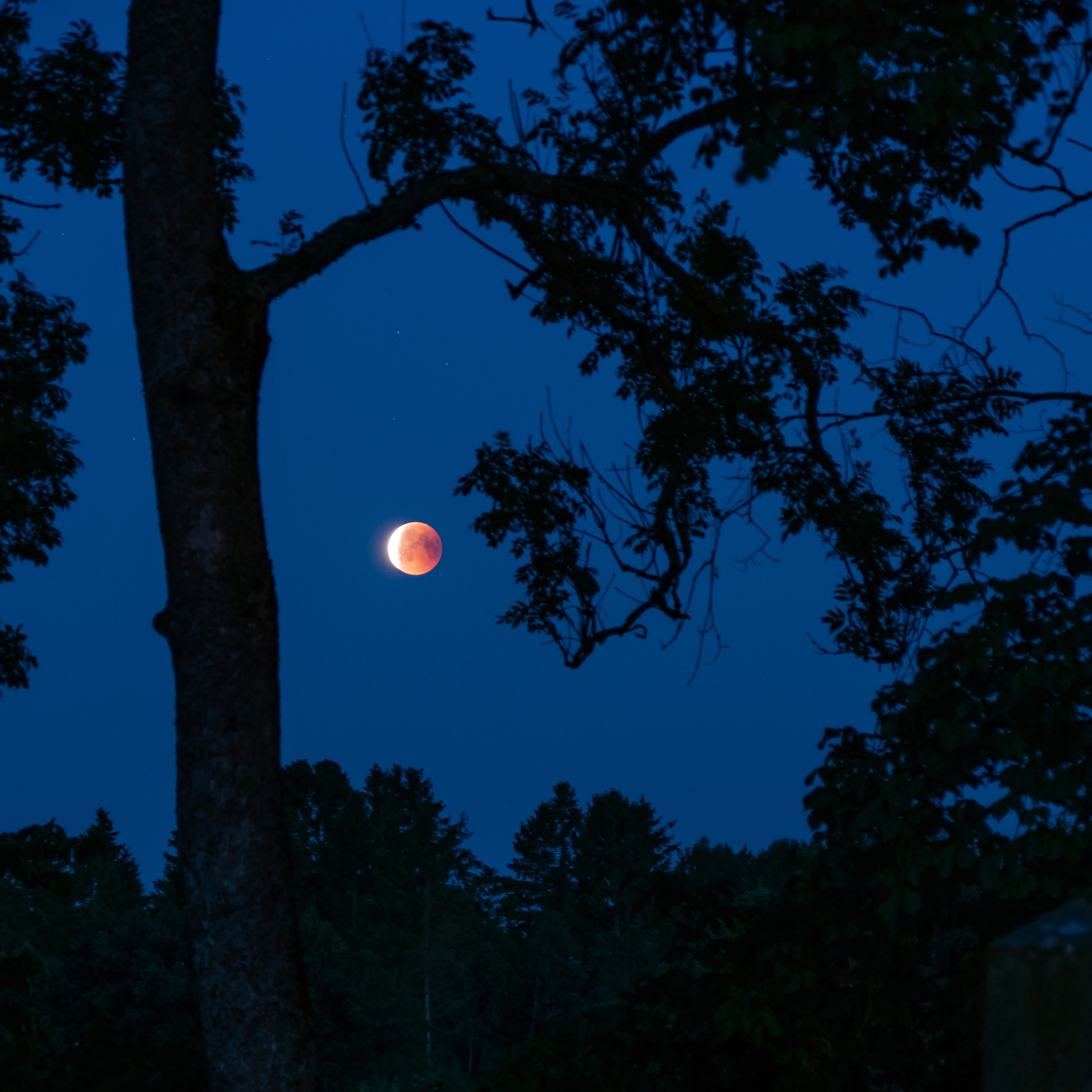
Brastad, Sweden, 21:24 UTC

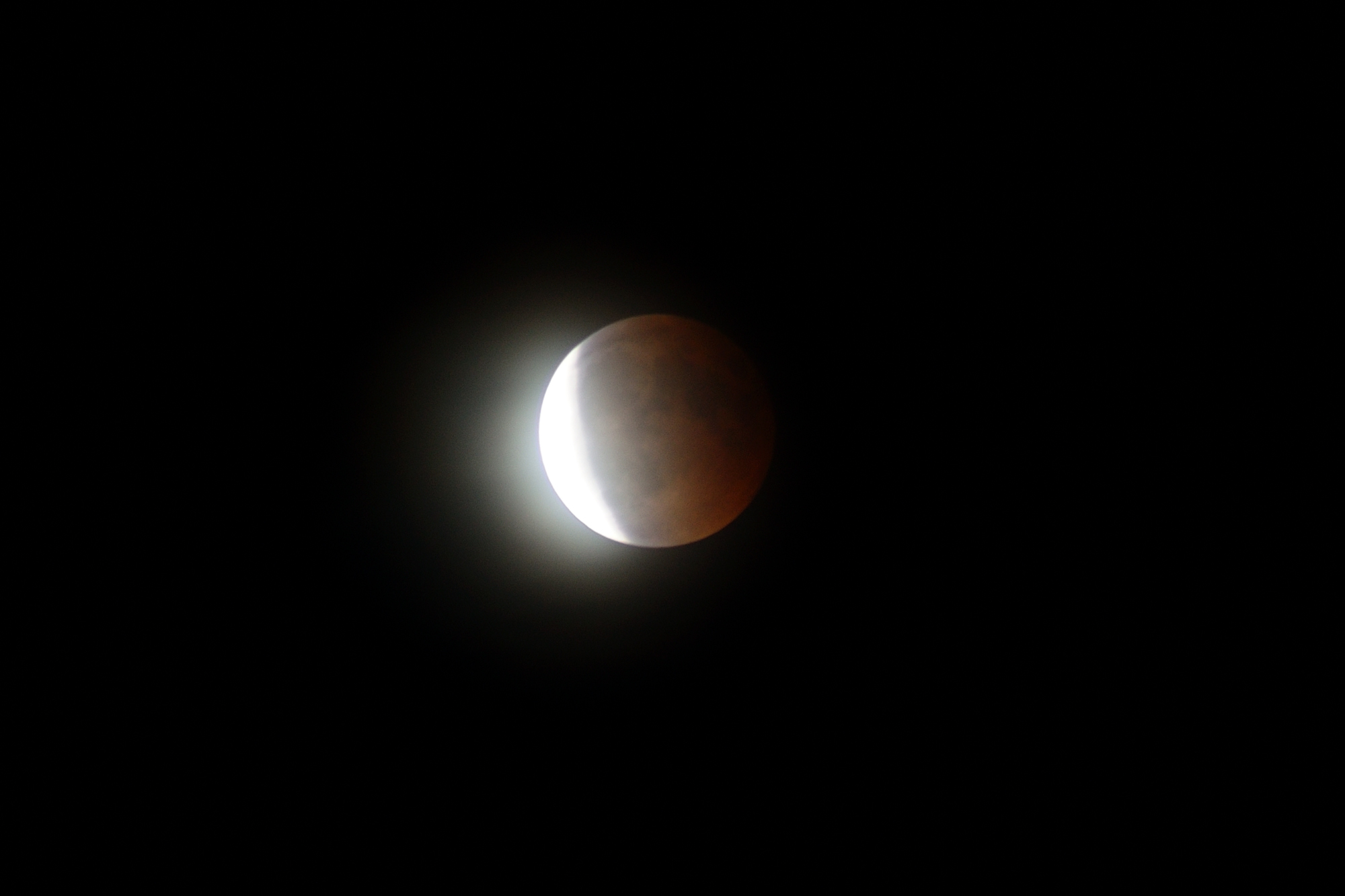
León, Spain, 21:27 UTC

== Eclipse details ==
Shown below is a table displaying details about this particular lunar eclipse. It describes various parameters pertaining to this eclipse.

July 27, 2018 Lunar Eclipse Parameters
Parameter	Value
Penumbral Magnitude	2.68050
Umbral Magnitude	1.60996
Gamma	0.11681
Sun Right Ascension	08h28m22.0s
Sun Declination	+19°04'25.2"
Sun Semi-Diameter	15'45.0"
Sun Equatorial Horizontal Parallax	08.7"
Moon Right Ascension	20h28m18.2s
Moon Declination	-18°58'10.6"
Moon Semi-Diameter	14'42.7"
Moon Equatorial Horizontal Parallax	0°53'59.7"
ΔT	68.9 s

== Eclipse season ==
This eclipse is part of an eclipse season, a period, roughly every six months, when eclipses occur. Only two (or occasionally three) eclipse seasons occur each year, and each season lasts about 35 days and repeats just short of six months (173 days) later; thus two full eclipse seasons always occur each year. Either two or three eclipses happen each eclipse season. In the sequence below, each eclipse is separated by a fortnight. The first and last eclipse in this sequence is separated by one synodic month.

Eclipse season of July–August 2018
July 13 Ascending node (new moon)	July 27 Descending node (full moon)	August 11 Ascending node (new moon)
Partial solar eclipse Solar Saros 117	Total lunar eclipse Lunar Saros 129	Partial solar eclipse Solar Saros 155

== Related eclipses ==
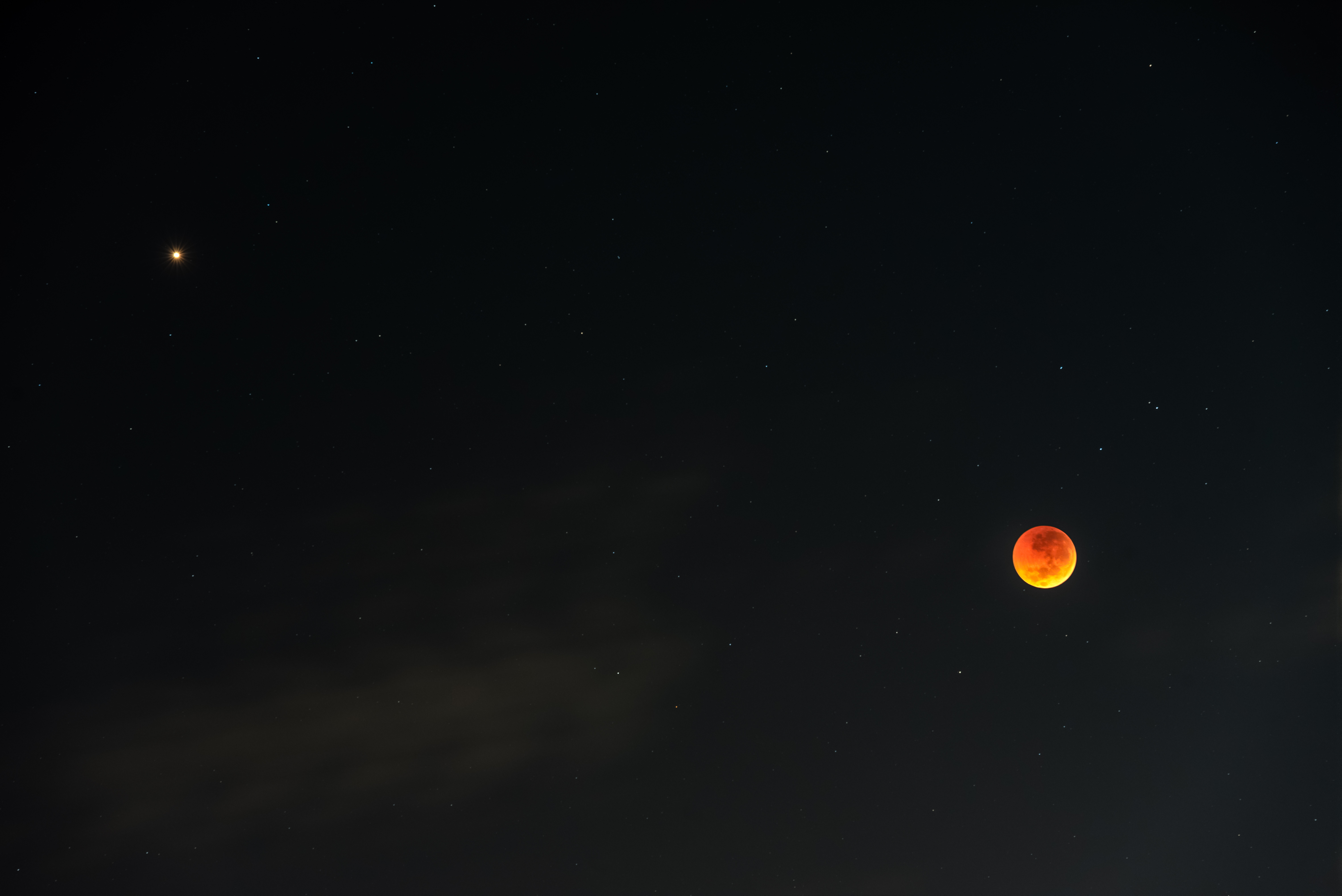
Wide angle view of the total lunar eclipse and Mars in Melbourne, Australia

=== Eclipses in 2018 ===
- A total lunar eclipse on January 31.
- A partial solar eclipse on February 15.
- A partial solar eclipse on July 13.
- A total lunar eclipse on July 27.
- A partial solar eclipse on August 11.

=== Metonic ===
- Preceded by: Lunar eclipse of October 8, 2014
- Followed by: Lunar eclipse of May 16, 2022

=== Tzolkinex ===
- Preceded by: Lunar eclipse of June 15, 2011
- Followed by: Lunar eclipse of September 7, 2025

=== Half-Saros ===
- Preceded by: Solar eclipse of July 22, 2009
- Followed by: Solar eclipse of August 2, 2027

=== Tritos ===
- Preceded by: Lunar eclipse of August 28, 2007
- Followed by: Lunar eclipse of June 26, 2029

=== Lunar Saros 129 ===
- Preceded by: Lunar eclipse of July 16, 2000
- Followed by: Lunar eclipse of August 7, 2036

=== Inex ===
- Preceded by: Lunar eclipse of August 17, 1989
- Followed by: Lunar eclipse of July 7, 2047

=== Triad ===
- Preceded by: Lunar eclipse of September 26, 1931
- Followed by: Lunar eclipse of May 28, 2105

=== Lunar eclipses of 2016–2020 ===
This eclipse is a member of a semester series. An eclipse in a semester series of lunar eclipses repeats approximately every 177 days and 4 hours (a semester) at alternating nodes of the Moon's orbit.

The penumbral lunar eclipses on March 23, 2016 and September 16, 2016 occur in the previous lunar year eclipse set, and the penumbral lunar eclipses on June 5, 2020 and November 30, 2020 occur in the next lunar year eclipse set.

Lunar eclipse series sets from 2016 to 2020
Descending node				Ascending node			
Saros	Date Viewing	Type Chart	Gamma	Saros	Date Viewing	Type Chart	Gamma
109	2016 Aug 18	Penumbral	1.5641	114	2017 Feb 11	Penumbral	−1.0255
119	2017 Aug 07	Partial	0.8669	124	2018 Jan 31	Total	−0.3014
129	2018 Jul 27	Total	0.1168	134	2019 Jan 21	Total	0.3684
139	2019 Jul 16	Partial	−0.6430	144	2020 Jan 10	Penumbral	1.0727
149	2020 Jul 05	Penumbral	−1.3639				

=== Saros 129 ===
This eclipse is a part of Saros series 129, repeating every 18 years, 11 days, and containing 71 events. The series started with a penumbral lunar eclipse on June 10, 1351. It contains partial eclipses from September 26, 1531 through May 11, 1892; total eclipses from May 24, 1910 through September 8, 2090; and a second set of partial eclipses from September 20, 2108 through April 26, 2469. The series ends at member 71 as a penumbral eclipse on July 24, 2613.

The longest duration of totality was produced by member 37 at 106 minutes, 24 seconds on July 16, 2000. All eclipses in this series occur at the Moon’s descending node of orbit.

Greatest	First			
The greatest eclipse of the series occurred on 2000 Jul 16, lasting 106 minutes, 24 seconds.	Penumbral	Partial	Total	Central
The greatest eclipse of the series occurred on 2000 Jul 16, lasting 106 minutes, 24 seconds.	1351 Jun 10	1531 Sep 26	1910 May 24	1946 Jun 14
The greatest eclipse of the series occurred on 2000 Jul 16, lasting 106 minutes, 24 seconds.	Last			
The greatest eclipse of the series occurred on 2000 Jul 16, lasting 106 minutes, 24 seconds.	Central	Total	Partial	Penumbral
The greatest eclipse of the series occurred on 2000 Jul 16, lasting 106 minutes, 24 seconds.	2036 Aug 07	2090 Sep 08	2469 Apr 26	2613 Jul 24

Eclipses are tabulated in three columns; every third eclipse in the same column is one exeligmos apart, so they all cast shadows over approximately the same parts of the Earth.

Series members 26–48 occur between 1801 and 2200:
26	27	28
1802 Mar 19	1820 Mar 29	1838 Apr 10
29	30	31
1856 Apr 20	1874 May 01	1892 May 11
32	33	34
1910 May 24	1928 Jun 03	1946 Jun 14
35	36	37
1964 Jun 25	1982 Jul 06	2000 Jul 16
38	39	40
2018 Jul 27	2036 Aug 07	2054 Aug 18
41	42	43
2072 Aug 28	2090 Sep 08	2108 Sep 20
44	45	46
2126 Oct 01	2144 Oct 11	2162 Oct 23
47	48	
2180 Nov 02	2198 Nov 13	

=== Tritos series ===
This eclipse is a part of a tritos cycle, repeating at alternating nodes every 135 synodic months (≈ 3986.63 days, or 11 years minus 1 month). Their appearance and longitude are irregular due to a lack of synchronization with the anomalistic month (period of perigee), but groupings of 3 tritos cycles (≈ 33 years minus 3 months) come close (≈ 434.044 anomalistic months), so eclipses are similar in these groupings.

Series members between 1801 and 2200
1811 Mar 10 (Saros 110)	1822 Feb 06 (Saros 111)	1833 Jan 06 (Saros 112)	1843 Dec 07 (Saros 113)	1854 Nov 04 (Saros 114)
1865 Oct 04 (Saros 115)	1876 Sep 03 (Saros 116)	1887 Aug 03 (Saros 117)	1898 Jul 03 (Saros 118)	1909 Jun 04 (Saros 119)
1920 May 03 (Saros 120)	1931 Apr 02 (Saros 121)	1942 Mar 03 (Saros 122)	1953 Jan 29 (Saros 123)	1963 Dec 30 (Saros 124)
1974 Nov 29 (Saros 125)	1985 Oct 28 (Saros 126)	1996 Sep 27 (Saros 127)	2007 Aug 28 (Saros 128)	2018 Jul 27 (Saros 129)
2029 Jun 26 (Saros 130)	2040 May 26 (Saros 131)	2051 Apr 26 (Saros 132)	2062 Mar 25 (Saros 133)	2073 Feb 22 (Saros 134)
2084 Jan 22 (Saros 135)	2094 Dec 21 (Saros 136)	2105 Nov 21 (Saros 137)	2116 Oct 21 (Saros 138)	2127 Sep 20 (Saros 139)
2138 Aug 20 (Saros 140)	2149 Jul 20 (Saros 141)	2160 Jun 18 (Saros 142)	2171 May 19 (Saros 143)	2182 Apr 18 (Saros 144)
2193 Mar 17 (Saros 145)

=== Inex series ===
This eclipse is a part of the long period inex cycle, repeating at alternating nodes, every 358 synodic months (≈ 10,571.95 days, or 29 years minus 20 days). Their appearance and longitude are irregular due to a lack of synchronization with the anomalistic month (period of perigee). However, groupings of 3 inex cycles (≈ 87 years minus 2 months) comes close (≈ 1,151.02 anomalistic months), so eclipses are similar in these groupings.

Series members between 1801 and 2200
1815 Dec 16 (Saros 122)	1844 Nov 24 (Saros 123)	1873 Nov 04 (Saros 124)
1902 Oct 17 (Saros 125)	1931 Sep 26 (Saros 126)	1960 Sep 05 (Saros 127)
1989 Aug 17 (Saros 128)	2018 Jul 27 (Saros 129)	2047 Jul 07 (Saros 130)
2076 Jun 17 (Saros 131)	2105 May 28 (Saros 132)	2134 May 08 (Saros 133)
2163 Apr 19 (Saros 134)	2192 Mar 28 (Saros 135)	

=== Half-Saros cycle ===
A lunar eclipse will be preceded and followed by solar eclipses by 9 years and 5.5 days (a half saros). This lunar eclipse is related to two total solar eclipses of Solar Saros 136.

July 22, 2009	August 2, 2027

== See also ==
- List of lunar eclipses and List of 21st-century lunar eclipses
