= July 2047 lunar eclipse =

Central lunar eclipse

- Total eclipse
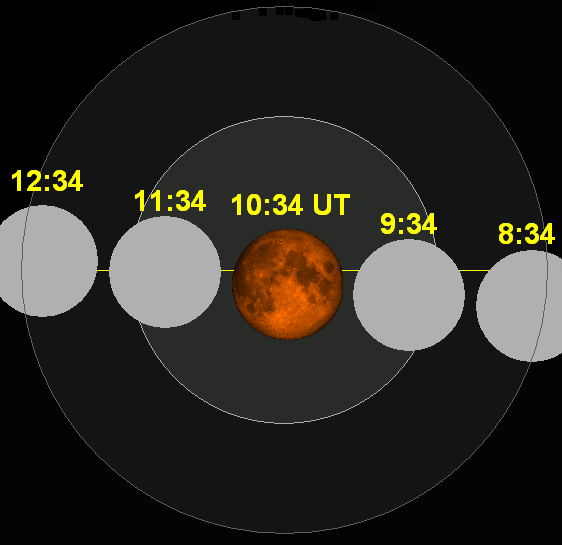
- The Moon's hourly motion shown right to left
- Date: July 7, 2047
- Gamma: −0.0636
- Magnitude: 1.7529
- Saros cycle: 130 (36 of 72)
- Totality: 100 minutes, 49 seconds
- Partiality: 218 minutes, 31 seconds
- Penumbral: 333 minutes, 27 seconds
Contacts (UTC)
- P1: 7:37:44
- U1: 8:44:58
- U2: 9:43:49
- Greatest: 10:34:15
- U3: 11:24:39
- U4: 12:23:29
- P4: 13:21:01

A total lunar eclipse will occur at the Moon’s ascending node of orbit on Sunday, July 7, 2047, with an umbral magnitude of 1.7529. It will be a central lunar eclipse, in which part of the Moon will pass through the center of the Earth's shadow. A lunar eclipse occurs when the Moon moves into the Earth's shadow, causing the Moon to be darkened. A total lunar eclipse occurs when the Moon's near side entirely passes into the Earth's umbral shadow. Unlike a solar eclipse, which can only be viewed from a relatively small area of the world, a lunar eclipse may be viewed from anywhere on the night side of Earth. A total lunar eclipse can last up to nearly two hours, while a total solar eclipse lasts only a few minutes at any given place, because the Moon's shadow is smaller. Occurring about 3.4 days after perigee (on July 4, 2047, at 0:55 UTC), the Moon's apparent diameter will be larger.

Totality will last 100 minutes 49 seconds, the second longest for this Saros series.

== Visibility ==
The eclipse will be completely visible over eastern Australia, Antarctica, and the central and eastern Pacific Ocean, seen rising over east Asia and western Australia and setting over North and South America.

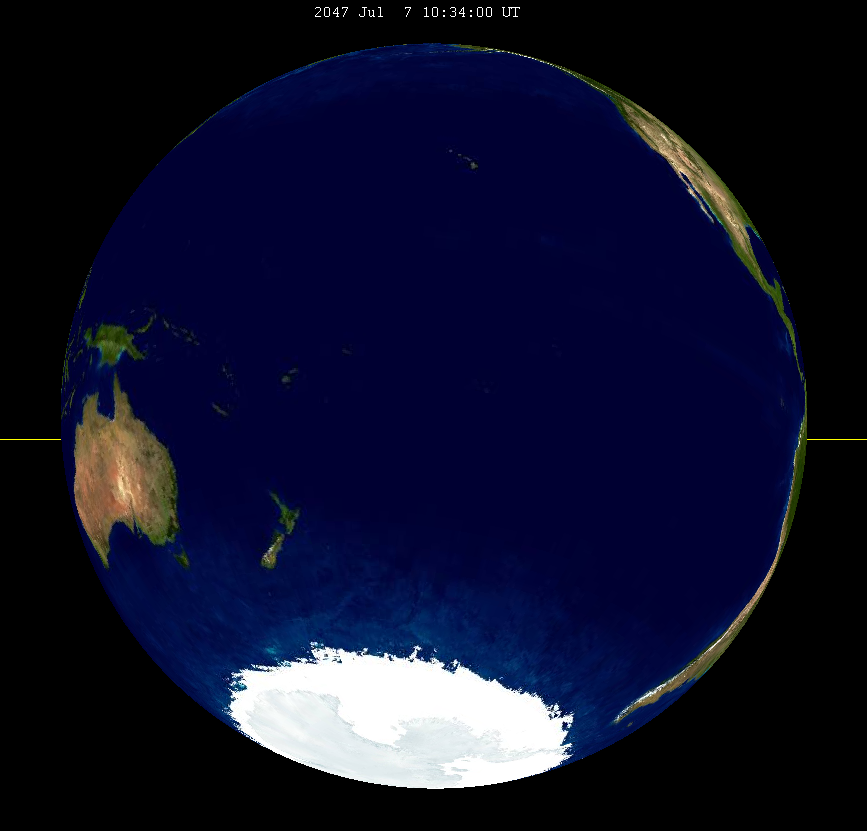
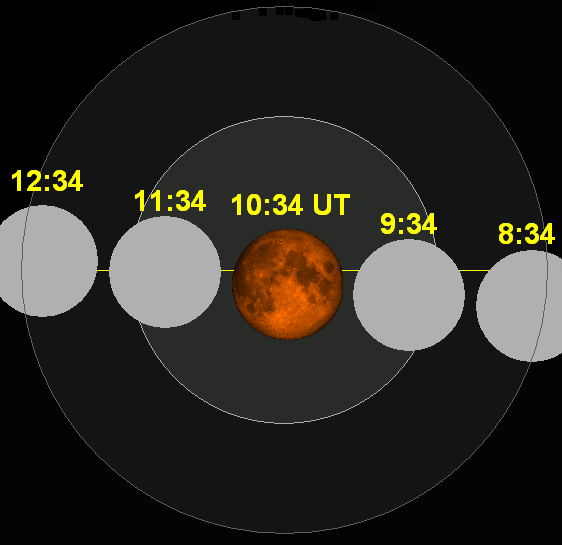

== Eclipse details ==
Shown below is a table displaying details about this particular solar eclipse. It describes various parameters pertaining to this eclipse.

July 7, 2047 Lunar Eclipse Parameters
Parameter	Value
Penumbral Magnitude	2.73257
Umbral Magnitude	1.75293
Gamma	−0.06362
Sun Right Ascension	07h06m19.6s
Sun Declination	+22°33'30.9"
Sun Semi-Diameter	15'43.9"
Sun Equatorial Horizontal Parallax	08.7"
Moon Right Ascension	19h06m23.0s
Moon Declination	-22°37'10.8"
Moon Semi-Diameter	16'03.5"
Moon Equatorial Horizontal Parallax	0°58'56.1"
ΔT	83.5 s

== Eclipse season ==
This eclipse is part of an eclipse season, a period, roughly every six months, when eclipses occur. Only two (or occasionally three) eclipse seasons occur each year, and each season lasts about 35 days and repeats just short of six months (173 days) later; thus two full eclipse seasons always occur each year. Either two or three eclipses happen each eclipse season. In the sequence below, each eclipse is separated by a fortnight. The first and last eclipse in this sequence is separated by one synodic month.

Eclipse season of June–July 2047
June 23 Descending node (new moon)	July 7 Ascending node (full moon)	July 22 Descending node (new moon)
Partial solar eclipse Solar Saros 118	Total lunar eclipse Lunar Saros 130	Partial solar eclipse Solar Saros 156

== Related eclipses ==
=== Eclipses in 2047 ===
- A total lunar eclipse on January 12.
- A partial solar eclipse on January 26.
- A partial solar eclipse on June 23.
- A total lunar eclipse on July 7.
- A partial solar eclipse on July 22.
- A partial solar eclipse on December 16.

=== Metonic ===
- Preceded by: Lunar eclipse of September 19, 2043
- Followed by: Lunar eclipse of April 26, 2051

=== Tzolkinex ===
- Preceded by: Lunar eclipse of May 26, 2040
- Followed by: Lunar eclipse of August 18, 2054

=== Half-Saros ===
- Preceded by: Solar eclipse of July 2, 2038
- Followed by: Solar eclipse of July 12, 2056

=== Tritos ===
- Preceded by: Lunar eclipse of August 7, 2036
- Followed by: Lunar eclipse of June 6, 2058

=== Lunar Saros 130 ===
- Preceded by: Lunar eclipse of June 26, 2029
- Followed by: Lunar eclipse of July 17, 2065

=== Inex ===
- Preceded by: Lunar eclipse of July 27, 2018
- Followed by: Lunar eclipse of June 17, 2076

=== Triad ===
- Preceded by: Lunar eclipse of September 5, 1960
- Followed by: Lunar eclipse of May 8, 2134

=== Lunar eclipses of 2046–2049 ===
This eclipse is a member of a semester series. An eclipse in a semester series of lunar eclipses repeats approximately every 177 days and 4 hours (a semester) at alternating nodes of the Moon's orbit.

The penumbral lunar eclipses on May 17, 2049 and November 9, 2049 occur in the next lunar year eclipse set.

Lunar eclipse series sets from 2046 to 2049
Descending node				Ascending node			
Saros	Date Viewing	Type Chart	Gamma	Saros	Date Viewing	Type Chart	Gamma
115	2046 Jan 22	Partial	0.9885	120	2046 Jul 18	Partial	−0.8691
125	2047 Jan 12	Total	0.3317	130	2047 Jul 07	Total	−0.0636
135	2048 Jan 01	Total	−0.3745	140	2048 Jun 26	Partial	0.6796
145	2048 Dec 20	Penumbral	−1.0624	150	2049 Jun 15	Penumbral	1.4068

=== Saros 130 ===
This eclipse is a part of Saros series 130, repeating every 18 years, 11 days, and containing 71 events. The series started with a penumbral lunar eclipse on June 10, 1416. It contains partial eclipses from September 4, 1560 through April 12, 1903; total eclipses from April 22, 1921 through September 11, 2155; and a second set of partial eclipses from September 21, 2173 through May 10, 2552. The series ends at member 71 as a penumbral eclipse on July 26, 2678.

The longest duration of totality will be produced by member 35 at 101 minutes, 53 seconds on June 26, 2029. All eclipses in this series occur at the Moon’s ascending node of orbit.

Greatest	First			
The greatest eclipse of the series will occur on 2029 Jun 26, lasting 101 minutes, 53 seconds.	Penumbral	Partial	Total	Central
The greatest eclipse of the series will occur on 2029 Jun 26, lasting 101 minutes, 53 seconds.	1416 Jun 10	1560 Sep 04	1921 Apr 22	1975 May 25
The greatest eclipse of the series will occur on 2029 Jun 26, lasting 101 minutes, 53 seconds.	Last			
The greatest eclipse of the series will occur on 2029 Jun 26, lasting 101 minutes, 53 seconds.	Central	Total	Partial	Penumbral
The greatest eclipse of the series will occur on 2029 Jun 26, lasting 101 minutes, 53 seconds.	2083 Jul 29	2155 Sep 11	2552 May 10	2678 Jul 26

Eclipses are tabulated in three columns; every third eclipse in the same column is one exeligmos apart, so they all cast shadows over approximately the same parts of the Earth.

Series members 23–44 occur between 1801 and 2200:
23	24	25
1813 Feb 15	1831 Feb 26	1849 Mar 09
26	27	28
1867 Mar 20	1885 Mar 30	1903 Apr 12
29	30	31
1921 Apr 22	1939 May 03	1957 May 13
32	33	34
1975 May 25	1993 Jun 04	2011 Jun 15
35	36	37
2029 Jun 26	2047 Jul 07	2065 Jul 17
38	39	40
2083 Jul 29	2101 Aug 09	2119 Aug 20
41	42	43
2137 Aug 30	2155 Sep 11	2173 Sep 21
44
2191 Oct 02

=== Tritos series ===
This eclipse is a part of a tritos cycle, repeating at alternating nodes every 135 synodic months (≈ 3986.63 days, or 11 years minus 1 month). Their appearance and longitude are irregular due to a lack of synchronization with the anomalistic month (period of perigee), but groupings of 3 tritos cycles (≈ 33 years minus 3 months) come close (≈ 434.044 anomalistic months), so eclipses are similar in these groupings.

Series members between 1801 and 2200
1807 May 21 (Saros 108)	1818 Apr 21 (Saros 109)	1829 Mar 20 (Saros 110)	1840 Feb 17 (Saros 111)	1851 Jan 17 (Saros 112)
1861 Dec 17 (Saros 113)	1872 Nov 15 (Saros 114)	1883 Oct 16 (Saros 115)	1894 Sep 15 (Saros 116)	1905 Aug 15 (Saros 117)
1916 Jul 15 (Saros 118)	1927 Jun 15 (Saros 119)	1938 May 14 (Saros 120)	1949 Apr 13 (Saros 121)	1960 Mar 13 (Saros 122)
1971 Feb 10 (Saros 123)	1982 Jan 09 (Saros 124)	1992 Dec 09 (Saros 125)	2003 Nov 09 (Saros 126)	2014 Oct 08 (Saros 127)
2025 Sep 07 (Saros 128)	2036 Aug 07 (Saros 129)	2047 Jul 07 (Saros 130)	2058 Jun 06 (Saros 131)	2069 May 06 (Saros 132)
2080 Apr 04 (Saros 133)	2091 Mar 05 (Saros 134)	2102 Feb 03 (Saros 135)	2113 Jan 02 (Saros 136)	2123 Dec 03 (Saros 137)
2134 Nov 02 (Saros 138)	2145 Sep 30 (Saros 139)	2156 Aug 30 (Saros 140)	2167 Aug 01 (Saros 141)	2178 Jun 30 (Saros 142)
2189 May 29 (Saros 143)	2200 Apr 30 (Saros 144)			

=== Inex series ===
This eclipse is a part of the long period inex cycle, repeating at alternating nodes, every 358 synodic months (≈ 10,571.95 days, or 29 years minus 20 days). Their appearance and longitude are irregular due to a lack of synchronization with the anomalistic month (period of perigee). However, groupings of 3 inex cycles (≈ 87 years minus 2 months) comes close (≈ 1,151.02 anomalistic months), so eclipses are similar in these groupings.

Series members between 1801 and 2200
1815 Dec 16 (Saros 122)	1844 Nov 24 (Saros 123)	1873 Nov 04 (Saros 124)
1902 Oct 17 (Saros 125)	1931 Sep 26 (Saros 126)	1960 Sep 05 (Saros 127)
1989 Aug 17 (Saros 128)	2018 Jul 27 (Saros 129)	2047 Jul 07 (Saros 130)
2076 Jun 17 (Saros 131)	2105 May 28 (Saros 132)	2134 May 08 (Saros 133)
2163 Apr 19 (Saros 134)	2192 Mar 28 (Saros 135)	

=== Half-Saros cycle ===
A lunar eclipse will be preceded and followed by solar eclipses by 9 years and 5.5 days (a half saros). This lunar eclipse is related to two annular solar eclipses of Solar Saros 137.

July 2, 2038	July 12, 2056

== See also ==
- List of lunar eclipses
- List of 21st-century lunar eclipses
