= June 2029 lunar eclipse =

Future lunar eclipse

- Total eclipse
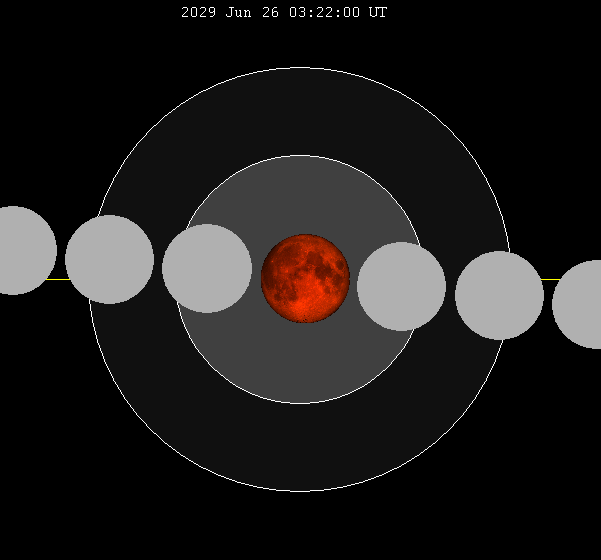
- The Moon's hourly motion shown right to left
- Date: June 26, 2029
- Gamma: 0.0124
- Magnitude: 1.8452
- Saros cycle: 130 (35 of 71)
- Totality: 102 minutes, 40 seconds
- Partiality: 220 minutes, 20 seconds
- Penumbral: 336 minutes, 1 second
Contacts (UTC)
- P1: 00:34:34
- U1: 01:32:18
- U2: 02:31:18
- Greatest: 03:22:05
- U3: 04:13:01
- U4: 05:11:50
- P4: 06:09:42

A total lunar eclipse will occur at the Moon’s ascending node of orbit on Tuesday, June 26, 2029, with an umbral magnitude of 1.8452. It will be a central lunar eclipse, in which part of the Moon will pass through the center of the Earth's shadow. A lunar eclipse occurs when the Moon moves into the Earth's shadow, causing the Moon to be darkened. A total lunar eclipse occurs when the Moon's near side entirely passes into the Earth's umbral shadow. Unlike a solar eclipse, which can only be viewed from a relatively small area of the world, a lunar eclipse may be viewed from anywhere on the night side of Earth. A total lunar eclipse can last up to nearly two hours, while a total solar eclipse lasts only a few minutes at any given place, because the Moon's shadow is smaller. Occurring about 3.5 days after perigee (15:35 UTC, June 22), the Moon's apparent diameter will be larger than average.

Totality will last 1 hour, 42 minutes, and 40 seconds—the maximum duration for Saros series 130. The eclipse will plunge the full Moon into deep darkness as it passes through the center of the Earth's umbral shadow. While the visual effect of a total eclipse is variable, the Moon may be stained a deep orange or red color at maximum eclipse.

With an umbral eclipse magnitude of 1.84520, this will be the largest lunar eclipse of the 21st century. Gamma will have a value of 0.01240. Due to the Moon's relatively large size as seen from Earth and greater speed in its elliptical orbit, totality will not last over 106 minutes. This will be the darkest total lunar eclipse in the 21st century.

During the eclipse, NGC 6629 will be occulted by the Moon over the Pacific Ocean and South America. Deep-sky objects are rarely occulted during a total eclipse from any given spot on Earth.

== Visibility ==
The eclipse will be completely visible over eastern North America, South America, and west Africa, seen rising over western and central North America and the eastern Pacific Ocean and setting over Africa, Europe, and the Middle East.

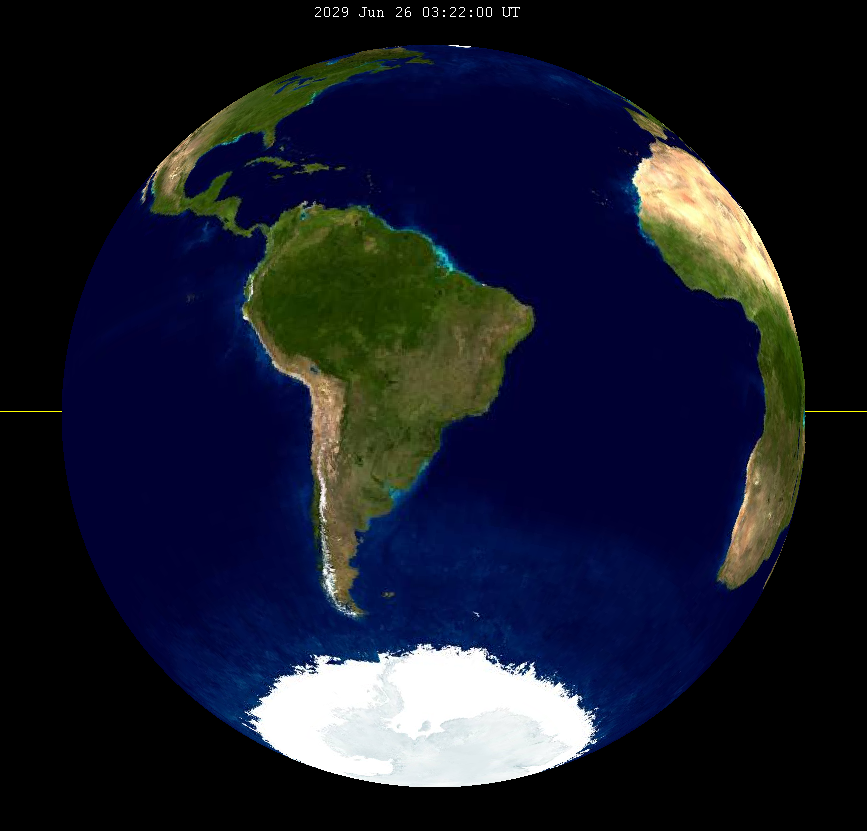
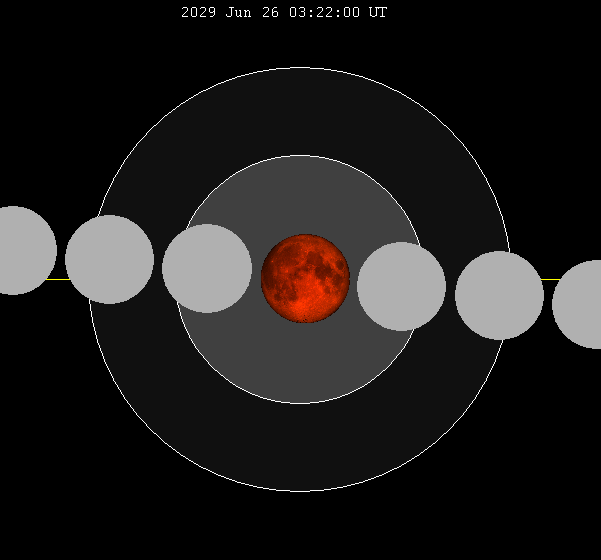

== Eclipse details ==
Shown below is a table displaying details about this particular lunar eclipse. It describes various parameters pertaining to this eclipse.

June 26, 2029 Lunar Eclipse Parameters
Parameter	Value
Penumbral Magnitude	2.82822
Umbral Magnitude	1.84520
Gamma	0.01240
Sun Right Ascension	06^{h} 21^{m} 03.1^{s}
Sun Declination	+23° 20′ 50.2″
Sun Semi-Diameter	15′ 44.1″
Sun Equatorial Horizontal Parallax	08.7″
Moon Right Ascension	18^{h} 21^{m} 02.6^{s}
Moon Declination	−23° 20′ 06.9″
Moon Semi-Diameter	16′ 00.4″
Moon Equatorial Horizontal Parallax	0° 58′ 44.7″
ΔT	73.6 s

== Eclipse season ==
This eclipse is part of an eclipse season, a period, roughly every six months, when eclipses occur. Only two (or occasionally three) eclipse seasons occur each year, and each season lasts about 35 days and repeats just short of six months (173 days) later; thus two full eclipse seasons always occur each year. Either two or three eclipses happen each eclipse season. In the sequence below, each eclipse is separated by a fortnight. The first and last eclipse in this sequence is separated by one synodic month.

Eclipse season of June–July 2029
June 12 Descending node (new moon)	June 26 Ascending node (full moon)	July 11 Descending node (new moon)
Partial solar eclipse Solar Saros 118	Total lunar eclipse Lunar Saros 130	Partial solar eclipse Solar Saros 156

== Related eclipses ==
=== Eclipses in 2029 ===
- A partial solar eclipse on January 14.
- A partial solar eclipse on June 12.
- A total lunar eclipse on June 26.
- A partial solar eclipse on July 11.
- A partial solar eclipse on December 5.
- A total lunar eclipse on December 20.

=== Metonic ===
- Preceded by: Lunar eclipse of September 7, 2025
- Followed by: Lunar eclipse of April 14, 2033

=== Tzolkinex ===
- Preceded by: Lunar eclipse of May 16, 2022
- Followed by: Lunar eclipse of August 7, 2036

=== Half-Saros ===
- Preceded by: Solar eclipse of June 21, 2020
- Followed by: Solar eclipse of July 2, 2038

=== Tritos ===
- Preceded by: Lunar eclipse of July 27, 2018
- Followed by: Lunar eclipse of May 26, 2040

=== Lunar Saros 130 ===
- Preceded by: Lunar eclipse of June 15, 2011
- Followed by: Lunar eclipse of July 7, 2047

=== Inex ===
- Preceded by: Lunar eclipse of July 16, 2000
- Followed by: Lunar eclipse of June 6, 2058

=== Triad ===
- Preceded by: Lunar eclipse of August 26, 1942
- Followed by: Lunar eclipse of April 27, 2116

=== Lunar eclipses of 2027–2031 ===
This eclipse is a member of a semester series. An eclipse in a semester series of lunar eclipses repeats approximately every 177 days and 4 hours (a semester) at alternating nodes of the Moon's orbit.

The penumbral lunar eclipses on February 20, 2027 and August 17, 2027 occur in the previous lunar year eclipse set, and the penumbral lunar eclipses on May 7, 2031 and October 30, 2031 occur in the next lunar year eclipse set.

Lunar eclipse series sets from 2027 to 2031
Ascending node				Descending node			
Saros	Date Viewing	Type Chart	Gamma	Saros	Date Viewing	Type Chart	Gamma
110	2027 Jul 18	Penumbral	−1.5759	115	2028 Jan 12	Partial	0.9818
120	2028 Jul 06	Partial	−0.7904	125	2028 Dec 31	Total	0.3258
130	2029 Jun 26	Total	0.0124	135	2029 Dec 20	Total	−0.3811
140	2030 Jun 15	Partial	0.7535	145	2030 Dec 09	Penumbral	−1.0732
150	2031 Jun 05	Penumbral	1.4732				

=== Metonic series ===
The Metonic cycle repeats nearly exactly every 19 years and represents a Saros cycle plus one lunar year. Because it occurs on the same calendar date, the Earth's shadow will be in nearly the same location relative to the background stars.

Ascending node	Descending node
1. 1991 Jun 27 - penumbral (110); 2. 2010 Jun 26 - partial (120); 3. 2029 Jun 26 - total (130); 4. 2048 Jun 26 - partial (140); 5. 2067 Jun 27 - penumbral (150)	1. 1991 Dec 21 - partial (115); 2. 2010 Dec 21 - total (125); 3. 2029 Dec 20 - total (135); 4. 2048 Dec 20 - partial (145)

=== Saros 130 ===
This eclipse is a part of Saros series 130, repeating every 18 years, 11 days, and containing 71 events. The series started with a penumbral lunar eclipse on June 10, 1416. It contains partial eclipses from September 4, 1560 through April 12, 1903; total eclipses from April 22, 1921 through September 11, 2155; and a second set of partial eclipses from September 21, 2173 through May 10, 2552. The series ends at member 71 as a penumbral eclipse on July 26, 2678.

The longest duration of totality will be produced by member 35 at 101 minutes, 53 seconds on June 26, 2029. All eclipses in this series occur at the Moon’s ascending node of orbit.

Greatest	First			
The greatest eclipse of the series will occur on 2029 Jun 26, lasting 101 minutes, 53 seconds.	Penumbral	Partial	Total	Central
The greatest eclipse of the series will occur on 2029 Jun 26, lasting 101 minutes, 53 seconds.	1416 Jun 10	1560 Sep 04	1921 Apr 22	1975 May 25
The greatest eclipse of the series will occur on 2029 Jun 26, lasting 101 minutes, 53 seconds.	Last			
The greatest eclipse of the series will occur on 2029 Jun 26, lasting 101 minutes, 53 seconds.	Central	Total	Partial	Penumbral
The greatest eclipse of the series will occur on 2029 Jun 26, lasting 101 minutes, 53 seconds.	2083 Jul 29	2155 Sep 11	2552 May 10	2678 Jul 26

Eclipses are tabulated in three columns; every third eclipse in the same column is one exeligmos apart, so they all cast shadows over approximately the same parts of the Earth.

Series members 23–44 occur between 1801 and 2200:
23	24	25
1813 Feb 15	1831 Feb 26	1849 Mar 09
26	27	28
1867 Mar 20	1885 Mar 30	1903 Apr 12
29	30	31
1921 Apr 22	1939 May 03	1957 May 13
32	33	34
1975 May 25	1993 Jun 04	2011 Jun 15
35	36	37
2029 Jun 26	2047 Jul 07	2065 Jul 17
38	39	40
2083 Jul 29	2101 Aug 09	2119 Aug 20
41	42	43
2137 Aug 30	2155 Sep 11	2173 Sep 21
44
2191 Oct 02

=== Tritos series ===
This eclipse is a part of a tritos cycle, repeating at alternating nodes every 135 synodic months (≈ 3986.63 days, or 11 years minus 1 month). Their appearance and longitude are irregular due to a lack of synchronization with the anomalistic month (period of perigee), but groupings of 3 tritos cycles (≈ 33 years minus 3 months) come close (≈ 434.044 anomalistic months), so eclipses are similar in these groupings.

Series members between 1801 and 2200
1811 Mar 10 (Saros 110)	1822 Feb 06 (Saros 111)	1833 Jan 06 (Saros 112)	1843 Dec 07 (Saros 113)	1854 Nov 04 (Saros 114)
1865 Oct 04 (Saros 115)	1876 Sep 03 (Saros 116)	1887 Aug 03 (Saros 117)	1898 Jul 03 (Saros 118)	1909 Jun 04 (Saros 119)
1920 May 03 (Saros 120)	1931 Apr 02 (Saros 121)	1942 Mar 03 (Saros 122)	1953 Jan 29 (Saros 123)	1963 Dec 30 (Saros 124)
1974 Nov 29 (Saros 125)	1985 Oct 28 (Saros 126)	1996 Sep 27 (Saros 127)	2007 Aug 28 (Saros 128)	2018 Jul 27 (Saros 129)
2029 Jun 26 (Saros 130)	2040 May 26 (Saros 131)	2051 Apr 26 (Saros 132)	2062 Mar 25 (Saros 133)	2073 Feb 22 (Saros 134)
2084 Jan 22 (Saros 135)	2094 Dec 21 (Saros 136)	2105 Nov 21 (Saros 137)	2116 Oct 21 (Saros 138)	2127 Sep 20 (Saros 139)
2138 Aug 20 (Saros 140)	2149 Jul 20 (Saros 141)	2160 Jun 18 (Saros 142)	2171 May 19 (Saros 143)	2182 Apr 18 (Saros 144)
2193 Mar 17 (Saros 145)

=== Inex series ===
This eclipse is a part of the long period inex cycle, repeating at alternating nodes, every 358 synodic months (≈ 10,571.95 days, or 29 years minus 20 days). Their appearance and longitude are irregular due to a lack of synchronization with the anomalistic month (period of perigee). However, groupings of 3 inex cycles (≈ 87 years minus 2 months) comes close (≈ 1,151.02 anomalistic months), so eclipses are similar in these groupings.

Series members between 1801 and 2200
1826 Nov 14 (Saros 123)	1855 Oct 25 (Saros 124)	1884 Oct 04 (Saros 125)
1913 Sep 15 (Saros 126)	1942 Aug 26 (Saros 127)	1971 Aug 06 (Saros 128)
2000 Jul 16 (Saros 129)	2029 Jun 26 (Saros 130)	2058 Jun 06 (Saros 131)
2087 May 17 (Saros 132)	2116 Apr 27 (Saros 133)	2145 Apr 07 (Saros 134)
2174 Mar 18 (Saros 135)

=== Half-Saros cycle ===
A lunar eclipse will be preceded and followed by solar eclipses by 9 years and 5.5 days (a half saros). This lunar eclipse is related to two annular solar eclipses of Solar Saros 137.

June 21, 2020	July 2, 2038

== See also ==
- Lists of lunar eclipses and List of lunar eclipses in the 21st century
