= May 2040 lunar eclipse =

2040 astronomical phenomenon

- Total eclipse
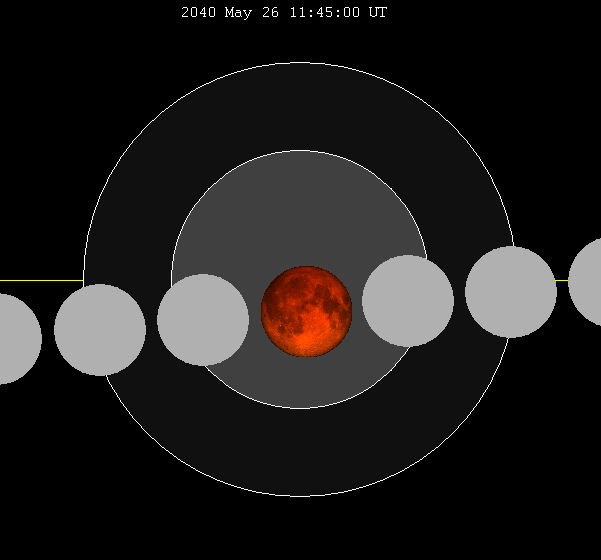
- The Moon's hourly motion shown right to left
- Date: May 26, 2040
- Gamma: −0.1872
- Magnitude: 1.5365
- Saros cycle: 131 (35 of 72)
- Totality: 92 minutes, 12 seconds
- Partiality: 210 minutes, 42 seconds
- Penumbral: 321 minutes, 26 seconds
Contacts (UTC)
- P1: 9:05:40
- U1: 10:01:01
- U2: 11:00:16
- Greatest: 11:46:22
- U3: 12:32:28
- U4: 13:31:43
- P4: 14:27:04

A total lunar eclipse will occur at the Moon’s descending node of orbit on Saturday, May 26, 2040, with an umbral magnitude of 1.5365. It will be a central lunar eclipse, in which part of the Moon will pass through the center of the Earth's shadow. A lunar eclipse occurs when the Moon moves into the Earth's shadow, causing the Moon to be darkened. A total lunar eclipse occurs when the Moon's near side entirely passes into the Earth's umbral shadow. Unlike a solar eclipse, which can only be viewed from a relatively small area of the world, a lunar eclipse may be viewed from anywhere on the night side of Earth. A total lunar eclipse can last up to nearly two hours, while a total solar eclipse lasts only a few minutes at any given place, because the Moon's shadow is smaller. Occurring about 1.4 days before perigee (on May 27, 2040, at 22:25 UTC), the Moon's apparent diameter will be larger.

== Visibility ==
The eclipse will be completely visible over Antarctica, Australia, and the Pacific Ocean, seen rising over east and south Asia and setting over North and South America.

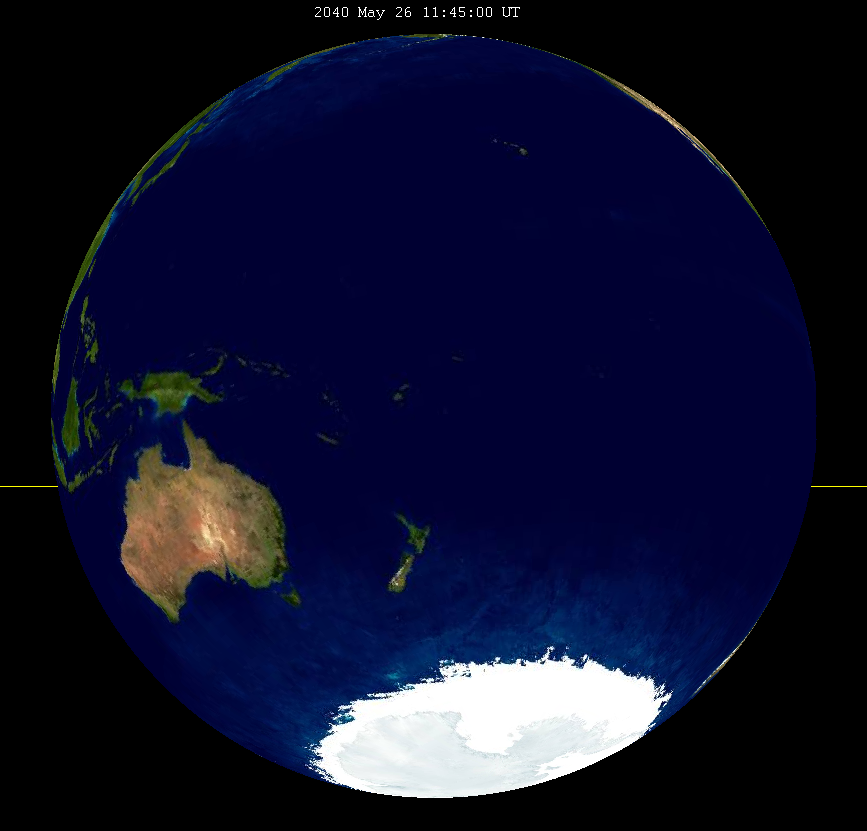
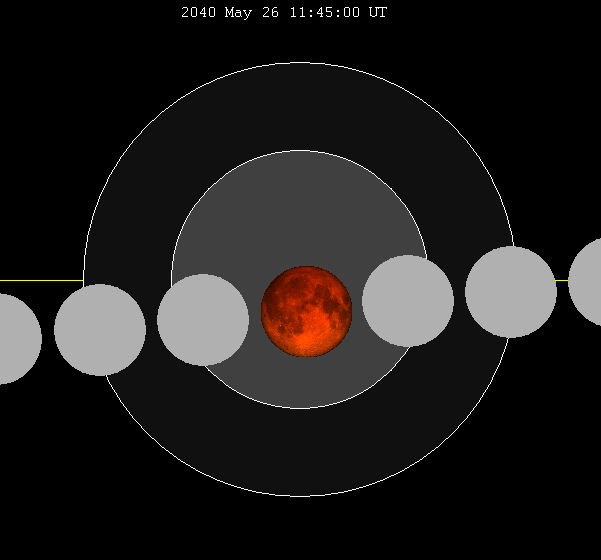

== Eclipse details ==
Shown below is a table displaying details about this particular eclipse. It describes various parameters pertaining to this eclipse.

May 26, 2040 lunar eclipse parameters
Parameter	Value
Penumbral magnitude	2.49551
Umbral magnitude	1.53646
Gamma	−0.18720
Sun right ascension	04h15m46.6s
Sun declination	+21°16'35.1"
Sun semi-diameter	15'47.2"
Sun equatorial horizontal parallax	08.7"
Moon right ascension	16h15m33.4s
Moon declination	-21°27'28.2"
Moon semi-diameter	16'27.7"
Moon equatorial horizontal parallax	1°00'24.9"
ΔT	79.3 s

== Eclipse season ==
This eclipse is part of an eclipse season, a period, roughly every six months, when eclipses occur. Only two (or occasionally three) eclipse seasons occur each year, and each season lasts about 35 days and repeats just short of six months (173 days) later; thus two full eclipse seasons always occur each year. Either two or three eclipses happen each eclipse season. In the sequence below, each eclipse is separated by a fortnight.

Eclipse season of May 2040
May 11 Ascending node (new moon)	May 26 Descending node (full moon)
Partial solar eclipse Solar Saros 119	Total lunar eclipse Lunar Saros 131

== Related eclipses ==
=== Eclipses in 2040 ===
- A partial solar eclipse on May 11
- A total lunar eclipse on May 26
- A partial solar eclipse on November 4
- A total lunar eclipse on November 18

=== Metonic ===
- Preceded by: Lunar eclipse of August 7, 2036
- Followed by: Lunar eclipse of March 13, 2044

=== Tzolkinex ===
- Preceded by: Lunar eclipse of April 14, 2033
- Followed by: Lunar eclipse of July 7, 2047

=== Half-Saros ===
- Preceded by: Solar eclipse of May 21, 2031
- Followed by: Solar eclipse of May 31, 2049

=== Tritos ===
- Preceded by: Lunar eclipse of June 26, 2029
- Followed by: Lunar eclipse of April 26, 2051

=== Lunar Saros 131 ===
- Preceded by: Lunar eclipse of May 16, 2022
- Followed by: Lunar eclipse of June 6, 2058

=== Inex ===
- Preceded by: Lunar eclipse of June 15, 2011
- Followed by: Lunar eclipse of May 6, 2069

=== Triad ===
- Preceded by: Lunar eclipse of July 26, 1953
- Followed by: Lunar eclipse of March 28, 2127

=== Lunar eclipses of 2038–2042 ===
This eclipse is a member of a semester series. An eclipse in a semester series of lunar eclipses repeats approximately every 177 days and 4 hours (a semester) at alternating nodes of the Moon's orbit.

The penumbral lunar eclipses on January 21, 2038 and July 16, 2038 occur in the previous lunar year eclipse set, and the penumbral lunar eclipses on April 5, 2042 and September 29, 2042 occur in the next lunar year eclipse set.

Lunar eclipse series sets from 2038 to 2042
Descending node				Ascending node			
Saros	Date Viewing	Type Chart	Gamma	Saros	Date Viewing	Type Chart	Gamma
111	2038 Jun 17	Penumbral	1.3082	116	2038 Dec 11	Penumbral	−1.1448
121	2039 Jun 06	Partial	0.5460	126	2039 Nov 30	Partial	−0.4721
131	2040 May 26	Total	−0.1872	136	2040 Nov 18	Total	0.2361
141	2041 May 16	Partial	−0.9746	146	2041 Nov 08	Partial	0.9212
				156	2042 Oct 28	Penumbral	−

=== Saros 131 ===
This eclipse is a part of Saros series 131, repeating every 18 years, 11 days, and containing 72 events. The series started with a penumbral lunar eclipse on May 10, 1427. It contains partial eclipses from July 25, 1553 through March 22, 1932; total eclipses from April 2, 1950 through September 3, 2202; and a second set of partial eclipses from September 13, 2220 through April 9, 2563. The series ends at member 72 as a penumbral eclipse on July 7, 2707.

The longest duration of totality will be produced by member 38 at 100 minutes, 36 seconds on June 28, 2094. All eclipses in this series occur at the Moon’s descending node of orbit.

Greatest	First			
The greatest eclipse of the series will occur on 2094 Jun 28, lasting 100 minutes, 36 seconds.	Penumbral	Partial	Total	Central
The greatest eclipse of the series will occur on 2094 Jun 28, lasting 100 minutes, 36 seconds.	1427 May 10	1553 Jul 25	1950 Apr 02	2022 May 16
The greatest eclipse of the series will occur on 2094 Jun 28, lasting 100 minutes, 36 seconds.	Last			
The greatest eclipse of the series will occur on 2094 Jun 28, lasting 100 minutes, 36 seconds.	Central	Total	Partial	Penumbral
The greatest eclipse of the series will occur on 2094 Jun 28, lasting 100 minutes, 36 seconds.	2148 Jul 31	2202 Sep 03	2563 Apr 09	2707 Jul 07

Eclipses are tabulated in three columns; every third eclipse in the same column is one exeligmos apart, so they all cast shadows over approximately the same parts of the Earth.

Series members 22–43 occur between 1801 and 2200:
22	23	24
1806 Jan 05	1824 Jan 16	1842 Jan 26
25	26	27
1860 Feb 07	1878 Feb 17	1896 Feb 28
28	29	30
1914 Mar 12	1932 Mar 22	1950 Apr 02
31	32	33
1968 Apr 13	1986 Apr 24	2004 May 04
34	35	36
2022 May 16	2040 May 26	2058 Jun 06
37	38	39
2076 Jun 17	2094 Jun 28	2112 Jul 09
40	41	42
2130 Jul 21	2148 Jul 31	2166 Aug 11
43
2184 Aug 21

=== Tritos series ===
This eclipse is a part of a tritos cycle, repeating at alternating nodes every 135 synodic months (≈ 3986.63 days, or 11 years minus 1 month). Their appearance and longitude are irregular due to a lack of synchronization with the anomalistic month (period of perigee), but groupings of 3 tritos cycles (≈ 33 years minus 3 months) come close (≈ 434.044 anomalistic months), so eclipses are similar in these groupings.

Series members between 1801 and 2200
1811 Mar 10 (Saros 110)	1822 Feb 06 (Saros 111)	1833 Jan 06 (Saros 112)	1843 Dec 07 (Saros 113)	1854 Nov 04 (Saros 114)
1865 Oct 04 (Saros 115)	1876 Sep 03 (Saros 116)	1887 Aug 03 (Saros 117)	1898 Jul 03 (Saros 118)	1909 Jun 04 (Saros 119)
1920 May 03 (Saros 120)	1931 Apr 02 (Saros 121)	1942 Mar 03 (Saros 122)	1953 Jan 29 (Saros 123)	1963 Dec 30 (Saros 124)
1974 Nov 29 (Saros 125)	1985 Oct 28 (Saros 126)	1996 Sep 27 (Saros 127)	2007 Aug 28 (Saros 128)	2018 Jul 27 (Saros 129)
2029 Jun 26 (Saros 130)	2040 May 26 (Saros 131)	2051 Apr 26 (Saros 132)	2062 Mar 25 (Saros 133)	2073 Feb 22 (Saros 134)
2084 Jan 22 (Saros 135)	2094 Dec 21 (Saros 136)	2105 Nov 21 (Saros 137)	2116 Oct 21 (Saros 138)	2127 Sep 20 (Saros 139)
2138 Aug 20 (Saros 140)	2149 Jul 20 (Saros 141)	2160 Jun 18 (Saros 142)	2171 May 19 (Saros 143)	2182 Apr 18 (Saros 144)
2193 Mar 17 (Saros 145)

=== Inex series ===
This eclipse is a part of the long period inex cycle, repeating at alternating nodes, every 358 synodic months (≈ 10,571.95 days, or 29 years minus 20 days). Their appearance and longitude are irregular due to a lack of synchronization with the anomalistic month (period of perigee). However, groupings of 3 inex cycles (≈ 87 years minus 2 months) comes close (≈ 1,151.02 anomalistic months), so eclipses are similar in these groupings.

Series members between 1801 and 2200
1808 Nov 03 (Saros 123)	1837 Oct 13 (Saros 124)	1866 Sep 24 (Saros 125)
1895 Sep 04 (Saros 126)	1924 Aug 14 (Saros 127)	1953 Jul 26 (Saros 128)
1982 Jul 06 (Saros 129)	2011 Jun 15 (Saros 130)	2040 May 26 (Saros 131)
2069 May 06 (Saros 132)	2098 Apr 15 (Saros 133)	2127 Mar 28 (Saros 134)
2156 Mar 07 (Saros 135)	2185 Feb 14 (Saros 136)	

=== Half-Saros cycle ===
A lunar eclipse will be preceded and followed by solar eclipses by 9 years and 5.5 days (a half saros). This lunar eclipse is related to two annular solar eclipses of Solar Saros 138.

May 21, 2031	May 31, 2049

== See also ==
- List of lunar eclipses and List of 21st-century lunar eclipses
