= Solar eclipse of September 21, 2025 =

Partial solar eclipse

- Partial eclipse
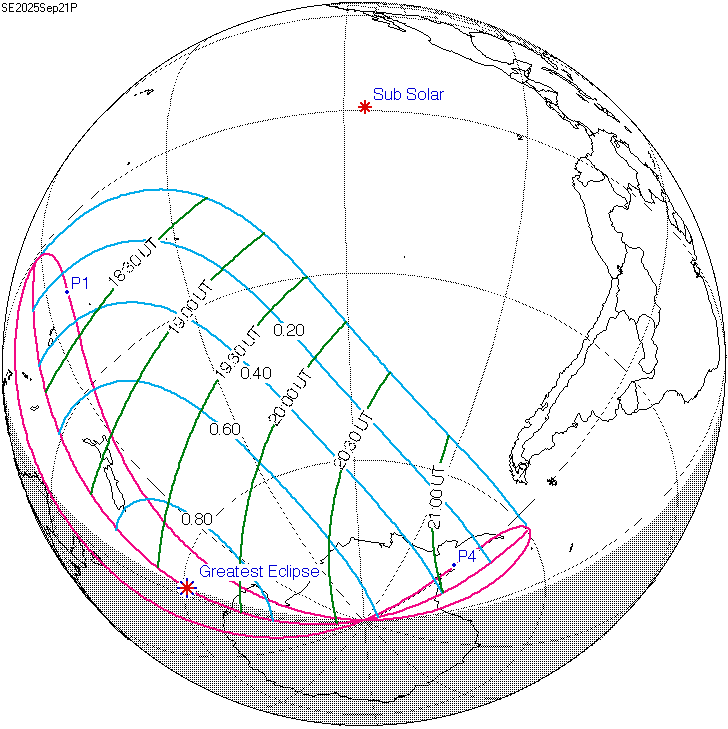
- Map
- Gamma: −1.0651
- Magnitude: 0.855

Maximum eclipse
- Coordinates: 60.9°S 153.5°E

Times (UTC)
- Greatest eclipse: 19:43:04

References
- Saros: 154 (7 of 71)
- Catalog # (SE5000): 9564

A partial solar eclipse occurred at the Moon’s descending node of orbit on Sunday, September 21, 2025, with a magnitude of 0.855. A solar eclipse occurs when the Moon passes between the Earth and the Sun, thereby totally or partly obscuring the image of the Sun for a viewer on Earth. A partial solar eclipse occurs in the polar regions of the Earth when the center of the Moon's shadow misses the Earth.

Partiality was visible across much of Oceania and Antarctica, with up to 80% coverage being visible at the southernmost point of New Zealand and on Stewart Island on the morning of September 22 local time. Most of New Zealand was covered in cloud on the morning of the eclipse, preventing many sightings.

== Images ==
Animated path

== Eclipse timing ==
=== Places experiencing partial eclipse ===
Solar Eclipse of September 21, 2025 (Local Times)
| Country or territory | City or place | Start of partial eclipse | Maximum eclipse | End of partial eclipse | Duration of eclipse (hr:min) | Maximum coverage |
|---|---|---|---|---|---|---|
| Tuvalu | Funafuti (Note: The times listed for this location occur on September 22, 2025, local time.) | 05:52:59 (sunrise) | 06:09:44 | 06:49:03 | 0:56 | 9.04% |
| Tokelau | Fakaofo | 06:31:42 | 07:10:52 | 07:52:58 | 1:21 | 8.95% |
| Wallis and Futuna | Mata Utu | 05:34:32 (sunrise) | 06:15:58 | 07:06:09 | 1:32 | 17.08% |
| Samoa | Apia | 06:29:54 | 07:17:20 | 08:09:04 | 1:39 | 16.87% |
| American Samoa | Pago Pago | 06:30:03 | 07:18:14 | 08:10:52 | 1:41 | 17.29% |
| Fiji | Lautoka | 06:00:05 (sunrise) | 06:22:08 | 07:17:16 | 1:17 | 26.47% |
| Fiji | Nadi | 06:00:15 (sunrise) | 06:22:25 | 07:17:49 | 1:18 | 26.87% |
| Fiji | Suva | 05:56:13 (sunrise) | 06:22:55 | 07:19:04 | 1:23 | 27.41% |
| Tonga | Neiafu | 06:31:03 | 07:24:34 | 08:23:32 | 1:52 | 26.58% |
| Niue | Alofi | 06:31:46 | 07:26:22 | 08:26:36 | 1:55 | 25.63% |
| Tonga | Pangai | 06:31:43 | 07:26:25 | 08:26:49 | 1:59 | 28.89% |
| Tonga | Nuku'alofa | 06:32:37 | 07:28:29 | 08:30:14 | 1:59 | 31.66% |
| French Polynesia | Vaitape | 07:45:31 | 08:31:29 | 09:21:00 | 1:35 | 8.96% |
| French Polynesia | Papeete | 07:49:23 | 08:35:16 | 09:24:33 | 1:35 | 8.37% |
| Cook Islands | Rarotonga | 07:38:08 | 08:35:20 | 09:38:19 | 2:00 | 22.69% |
| Vanuatu | Port Vila | 05:36:38 (sunrise) | 05:38:54 | 06:15:28 | 0:39 | 22.28% |
| Norfolk Island | Kingston | 05:38:06 (sunrise) | 05:40:45 | 06:43:08 | 1:05 | 49.07% |
| Vanuatu | Luganville | 05:41:10 (sunrise) | 05:43:22 | 06:09:24 | 0:28 | 14.09% |
| New Caledonia | Nouméa | 05:44:09 (sunrise) | 05:46:28 | 06:26:33 | 0:42 | 29.77% |
| New Zealand | Auckland | 06:10:52 (sunrise) | 06:55:14 | 08:04:41 | 1:54 | 60.79% |
| New Zealand | Wellington | 06:10:44 (sunrise) | 07:04:04 | 08:15:03 | 2:04 | 66.25% |
| New Zealand | Christchurch | 06:19:15 (sunrise) | 07:08:07 | 08:18:50 | 2:00 | 69.15% |
| New Zealand | Chatham Islands | 06:49:50 | 07:57:56 | 09:12:40 | 2:23 | 65.33% |
| Australia | Lord Howe Island | 05:43:33 (sunrise) | 05:46:03 | 06:16:36 | 0:33 | 27.82% |
| Australia | Macquarie Island | 05:13:31 (sunrise) | 05:28:45 | 06:36:25 | 1:23 | 78.46% |
| Australia | Sydney | 05:45:01 (sunrise) | 05:47:35 | 05:50:53 | 0:06 | 1.18% |
| Australia | Canberra | 05:53:19 (sunrise) | 05:53:19 | 05:53:51 | 0:01 | 0.08% |
| Australia | Hobart | 06:00:22 (sunrise) | 06:03:16 | 06:09:32 | 0:09 | 3.20% |
| Antarctica | Zucchelli Station | 07:05:10 | 08:10:25 | 09:17:46 | 2:13 | 72.55% |
| Antarctica | McMurdo Station | 07:11:44 | 08:16:46 | 09:23:25 | 2:12 | 69.26% |

== Eclipse details ==
Shown below are two tables displaying details about this particular solar eclipse. The first table outlines times at which the Moon's penumbra or umbra attains the specific parameter, and the second table describes various other parameters pertaining to this eclipse.

September 21, 2025 Solar Eclipse Times
| Event | Time (UTC) |
|---|---|
| First Penumbral External Contact | 2025 September 21 at 17:30:51.3 UTC |
| Greatest Eclipse | 2025 September 21 at 19:43:04.2 UTC |
| Ecliptic Conjunction | 2025 September 21 at 19:55:17.4 UTC |
| Equatorial Conjunction | 2025 September 21 at 20:51:38.8 UTC |
| Last Penumbral External Contact | 2025 September 21 at 21:54:55.1 UTC |

September 21, 2025 Solar Eclipse Parameters
| Parameter | Value |
|---|---|
| Eclipse Magnitude | 0.85504 |
| Eclipse Obscuration | 0.79691 |
| Gamma | −1.06509 |
| Sun Right Ascension | 11h56m36.9s |
| Sun Declination | +00°22'00.7" |
| Sun Semi-Diameter | 15'55.9" |
| Sun Equatorial Horizontal Parallax | 08.8" |
| Moon Right Ascension | 11h54m42.8s |
| Moon Declination | -00°29'14.7" |
| Moon Semi-Diameter | 15'02.8" |
| Moon Equatorial Horizontal Parallax | 0°55'13.2" |
| ΔT | 72.1 s |

== Eclipse season ==
This eclipse is part of an eclipse season, a period, roughly every six months, when eclipses occur. Only two (or occasionally three) eclipse seasons occur each year, and each season lasts about 35 days and repeats just short of six months (173 days) later; thus two full eclipse seasons always occur each year. Either two or three eclipses happen each eclipse season. In the sequence below, each eclipse is separated by a fortnight.

Eclipse season of September 2025
| September 7 Ascending node (full moon) | September 21 Descending node (new moon) |
|---|---|
| Total lunar eclipse Lunar Saros 128 | Partial solar eclipse Solar Saros 154 |

== Related eclipses ==
=== Eclipses in 2025 ===
- A total lunar eclipse on March 14.
- A partial solar eclipse on March 29.
- A total lunar eclipse on September 7.
- A partial solar eclipse on September 21.

=== Metonic ===
- Preceded by: Solar eclipse of December 4, 2021
- Followed by: Solar eclipse of July 11, 2029

=== Tzolkinex ===
- Preceded by: Solar eclipse of August 11, 2018
- Followed by: Solar eclipse of November 3, 2032

=== Half-Saros ===
- Preceded by: Lunar eclipse of September 16, 2016
- Followed by: Lunar eclipse of September 28, 2034

=== Tritos ===
- Preceded by: Solar eclipse of October 23, 2014
- Followed by: Solar eclipse of August 21, 2036

=== Solar Saros 154 ===
- Preceded by: Solar eclipse of September 11, 2007
- Followed by: Solar eclipse of October 3, 2043

=== Inex ===
- Preceded by: Solar eclipse of October 12, 1996
- Followed by: Solar eclipse of September 2, 2054

=== Triad ===
- Preceded by: Solar eclipse of November 21, 1938
- Followed by: Solar eclipse of July 23, 2112

=== Solar eclipses of 2022–2025 ===
Solar eclipse series sets from 2022 to 2025
| Ascending node | | | Descending node | | |
| Saros | Map | Gamma | Saros | Map | Gamma |
| 119 Partial in CTIO, Chile | April 30, 2022 Partial | −1.19008 | 124 Partial from Saratov, Russia | October 25, 2022 Partial | 1.07014 |
| 129 Totality in Timor-Leste | April 20, 2023 Hybrid | −0.39515 | 134 Annularity from Mexican Hat, Utah, USA | October 14, 2023 Annular | 0.37534 |
| 139 Totality in Dallas, TX, USA | April 8, 2024 Total | 0.34314 | 144 Annularity in Santa Cruz Province, Argentina | October 2, 2024 Annular | −0.35087 |
| 149 Partial from Halifax, Canada | March 29, 2025 Partial | 1.04053 | 154 | September 21, 2025 Partial | −1.06509 |

=== Saros 154 ===
This eclipse is a part of Saros series 154, repeating every 18 years, 11 days, and containing 71 events. The series started with a partial solar eclipse on July 19, 1917. It contains annular eclipses from October 3, 2043, through March 27, 2332; hybrid eclipses from April 7, 2350 through April 29, 2386; and total eclipses from May 9, 2404 through May 29, 3035. The series ends at member 71 as a partial eclipse on August 25, 3179. Its eclipses are tabulated in three columns; every third eclipse in the same column is one exeligmos apart, so they all cast shadows over approximately the same parts of the Earth.

The longest duration of annularity will be produced by member 9 at 3 minutes, 41 seconds on October 13, 2061, and the longest duration of totality will be produced by member 35 at 4 minutes, 50 seconds on July 25, 2530. All eclipses in this series occur at the Moon’s descending node of orbit.

Series members 1–16 occur between 1917 and 2200:
| 1 | 2 | 3 |
|---|---|---|
| July 19, 1917 | July 30, 1935 | August 9, 1953 |
| 4 | 5 | 6 |
| August 20, 1971 | August 31, 1989 | September 11, 2007 |
| 7 | 8 | 9 |
| September 21, 2025 | October 3, 2043 | October 13, 2061 |
| 10 | 11 | 12 |
| October 24, 2079 | November 4, 2097 | November 16, 2115 |
| 13 | 14 | 15 |
| November 26, 2133 | December 8, 2151 | December 18, 2169 |
16
December 29, 2187

=== Metonic series ===
The metonic series repeats eclipses every 19 years (6939.69 days), lasting about 5 cycles. Eclipses occur in nearly the same calendar date. In addition, the octon subseries repeats 1/5 of that or every 3.8 years (1387.94 days). All eclipses in this table occur at the Moon's descending node.

21 eclipse events between July 11, 1953 and July 11, 2029
| July 10–11 | April 29–30 | February 15–16 | December 4 | September 21–23 |
| 116 | 118 | 120 | 122 | 124 |
|---|---|---|---|---|
| July 11, 1953 | April 30, 1957 | February 15, 1961 | December 4, 1964 | September 22, 1968 |
| 126 | 128 | 130 | 132 | 134 |
| July 10, 1972 | April 29, 1976 | February 16, 1980 | December 4, 1983 | September 23, 1987 |
| 136 | 138 | 140 | 142 | 144 |
| July 11, 1991 | April 29, 1995 | February 16, 1999 | December 4, 2002 | September 22, 2006 |
| 146 | 148 | 150 | 152 | 154 |
| July 11, 2010 | April 29, 2014 | February 15, 2018 | December 4, 2021 | September 21, 2025 |
156
July 11, 2029

=== Tritos series ===
This eclipse is a part of a tritos cycle, repeating at alternating nodes every 135 synodic months (≈ 3986.63 days, or 11 years minus 1 month). Their appearance and longitude are irregular due to a lack of synchronization with the anomalistic month (period of perigee), but groupings of 3 tritos cycles (≈ 33 years minus 3 months) come close (≈ 434.044 anomalistic months), so eclipses are similar in these groupings.

The partial solar eclipses on November 16, 2134 (part of Saros 164) and October 16, 2145 (part of Saros 165) are also a part of this series but are not included in the table below.

Series members between 1801 and 2069
| June 6, 1807 (Saros 134) | May 5, 1818 (Saros 135) | April 3, 1829 (Saros 136) | March 4, 1840 (Saros 137) | February 1, 1851 (Saros 138) |
| December 31, 1861 (Saros 139) | November 30, 1872 (Saros 140) | October 30, 1883 (Saros 141) | September 29, 1894 (Saros 142) | August 30, 1905 (Saros 143) |
| July 30, 1916 (Saros 144) | June 29, 1927 (Saros 145) | May 29, 1938 (Saros 146) | April 28, 1949 (Saros 147) | March 27, 1960 (Saros 148) |
| February 25, 1971 (Saros 149) | January 25, 1982 (Saros 150) | December 24, 1992 (Saros 151) | November 23, 2003 (Saros 152) | October 23, 2014 (Saros 153) |
| September 21, 2025 (Saros 154) | August 21, 2036 (Saros 155) | July 22, 2047 (Saros 156) | June 21, 2058 (Saros 157) | May 20, 2069 (Saros 158) |

=== Inex series ===
This eclipse is a part of the long period inex cycle, repeating at alternating nodes, every 358 synodic months (≈ 10,571.95 days, or 29 years minus 20 days). Their appearance and longitude are irregular due to a lack of synchronization with the anomalistic month (period of perigee). However, groupings of 3 inex cycles (≈ 87 years minus 2 months) comes close (≈ 1,151.02 anomalistic months), so eclipses are similar in these groupings.

Series members between 1801 and 2200
| February 11, 1823 (Saros 147) | January 21, 1852 (Saros 148) | December 31, 1880 (Saros 149) |
| December 12, 1909 (Saros 150) | November 21, 1938 (Saros 151) | November 2, 1967 (Saros 152) |
| October 12, 1996 (Saros 153) | September 21, 2025 (Saros 154) | September 2, 2054 (Saros 155) |
| August 13, 2083 (Saros 156) | July 23, 2112 (Saros 157) | July 3, 2141 (Saros 158) |
| June 14, 2170 (Saros 159) | May 24, 2199 (Saros 160) | |
