= March 2025 lunar eclipse =

Total lunar eclipse of 14 March 2025

- Total eclipse
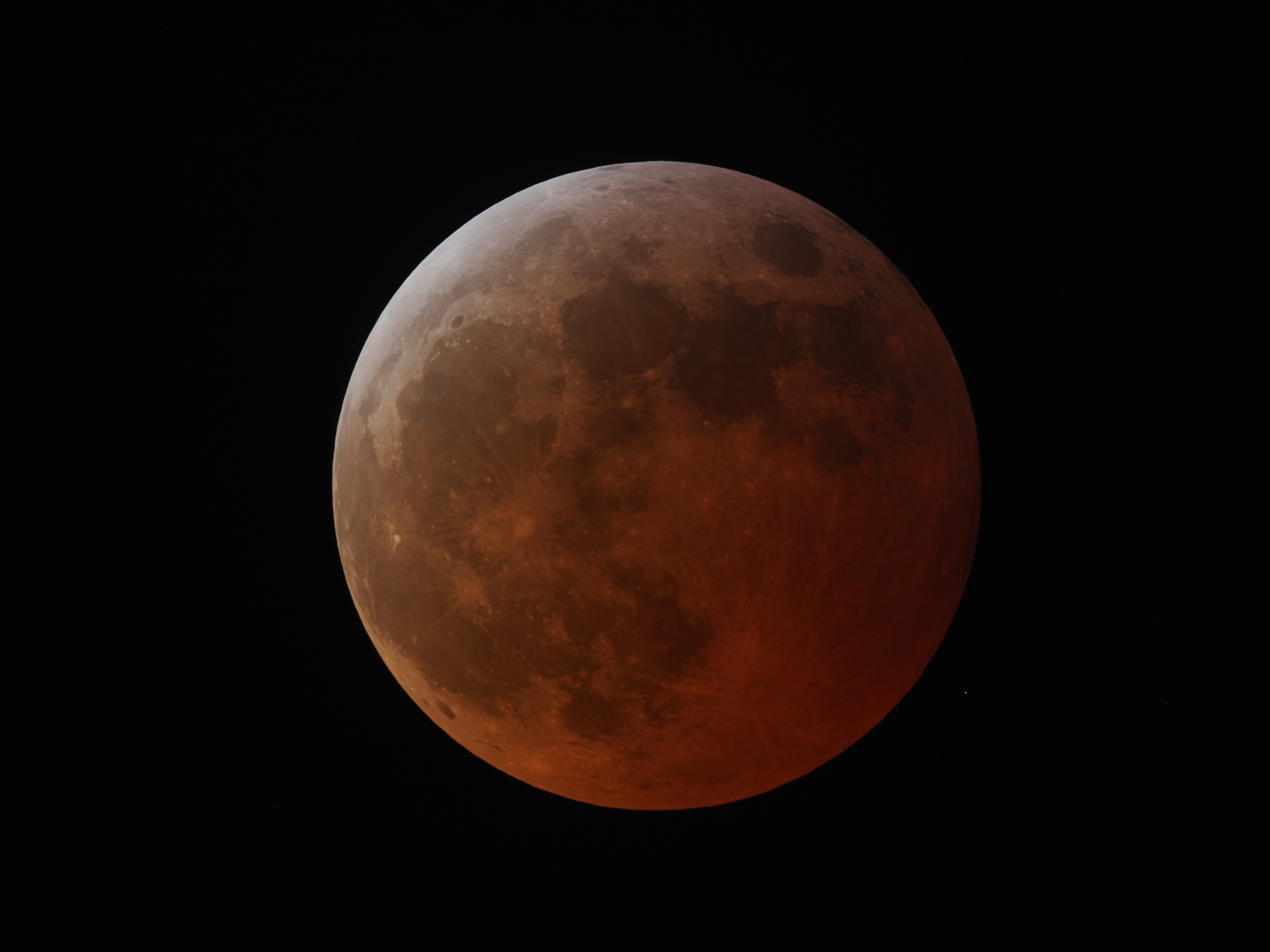
- View from Olympia, Washington, 7:09 UTC
- Date: March 14, 2025
- Gamma: 0.3485
- Magnitude: 1.1804
- Saros cycle: 123 (53 of 72)
- Totality: 66 minutes, 4 seconds
- Partiality: 218 minutes, 56 seconds
- Penumbral: 363 minutes, 22 seconds
Contacts (UTC)
- P1: 3:57:12
- U1: 5:09:25
- U2: 6:26:00
- Greatest: 6:58:47
- U3: 7:32:04
- U4: 8:48:21
- P4: 10:00:34

A total lunar eclipse occurred at the Moon's descending node of orbit on Friday, March 14, 2025, with an umbral magnitude of 1.1804. A lunar eclipse occurs when the Moon moves into the Earth's shadow, causing the Moon to be darkened. A total lunar eclipse occurs when the Moon's near side entirely passes into the Earth's umbral shadow. Unlike a total solar eclipse, which can only be viewed from a relatively small area of the world, a lunar eclipse may be viewed from anywhere on the night side of Earth. A total lunar eclipse can last up to nearly two hours, while a total solar eclipse lasts only a few minutes at any given place, because the Moon's shadow is smaller. Occurring about 3.4 days before apogee (March 17, 2025, at 16:37 UTC), the Moon's apparent diameter was smaller than average.

This lunar eclipse was the first of an almost tetrad, with the others being on September 8, 2025 (total); March 3, 2026 (total); and August 28, 2026 (partial).

This eclipse was seen from the surface of the Moon by Firefly Aerospace's Blue Ghost Mission 1 lander, which captured images of the ring of light around the Earth as the Sun passed behind it and the red glow on the Moon's surface.

== Visibility ==
The eclipse was completely visible over North America and South America, seen rising over Australia and northeast Asia and setting over Africa and Europe.

Simulated view of earth from moon	From moon, with IR clouds

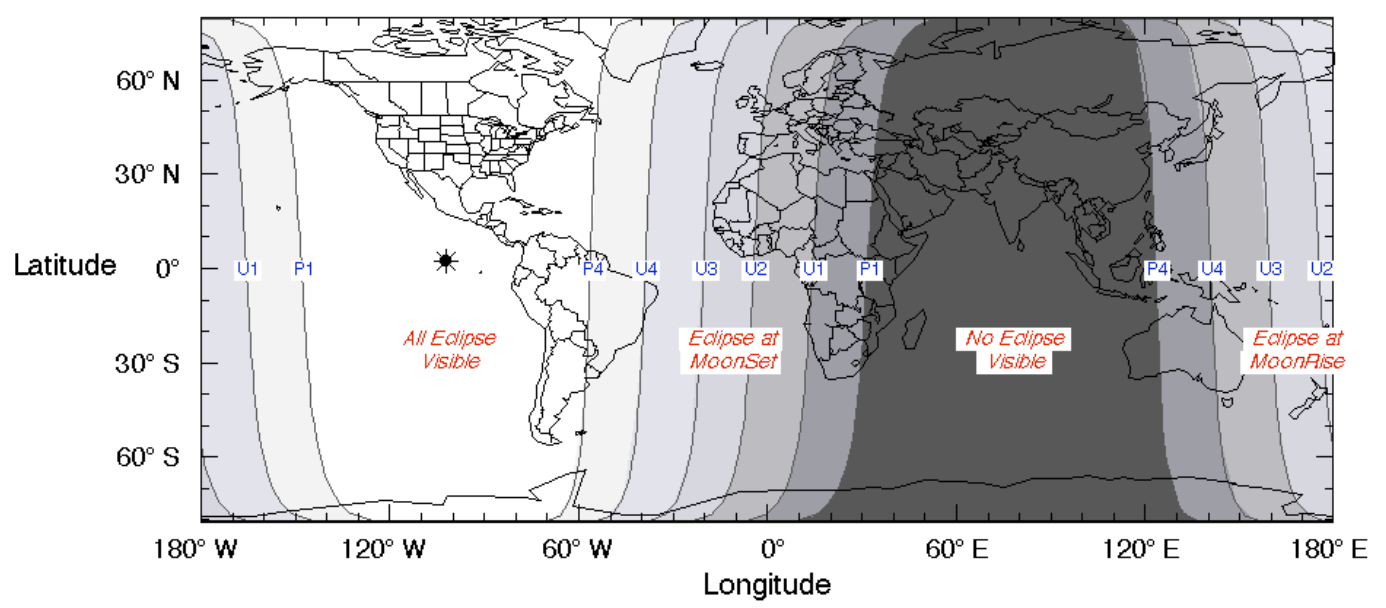
Visibility map

== Gallery ==
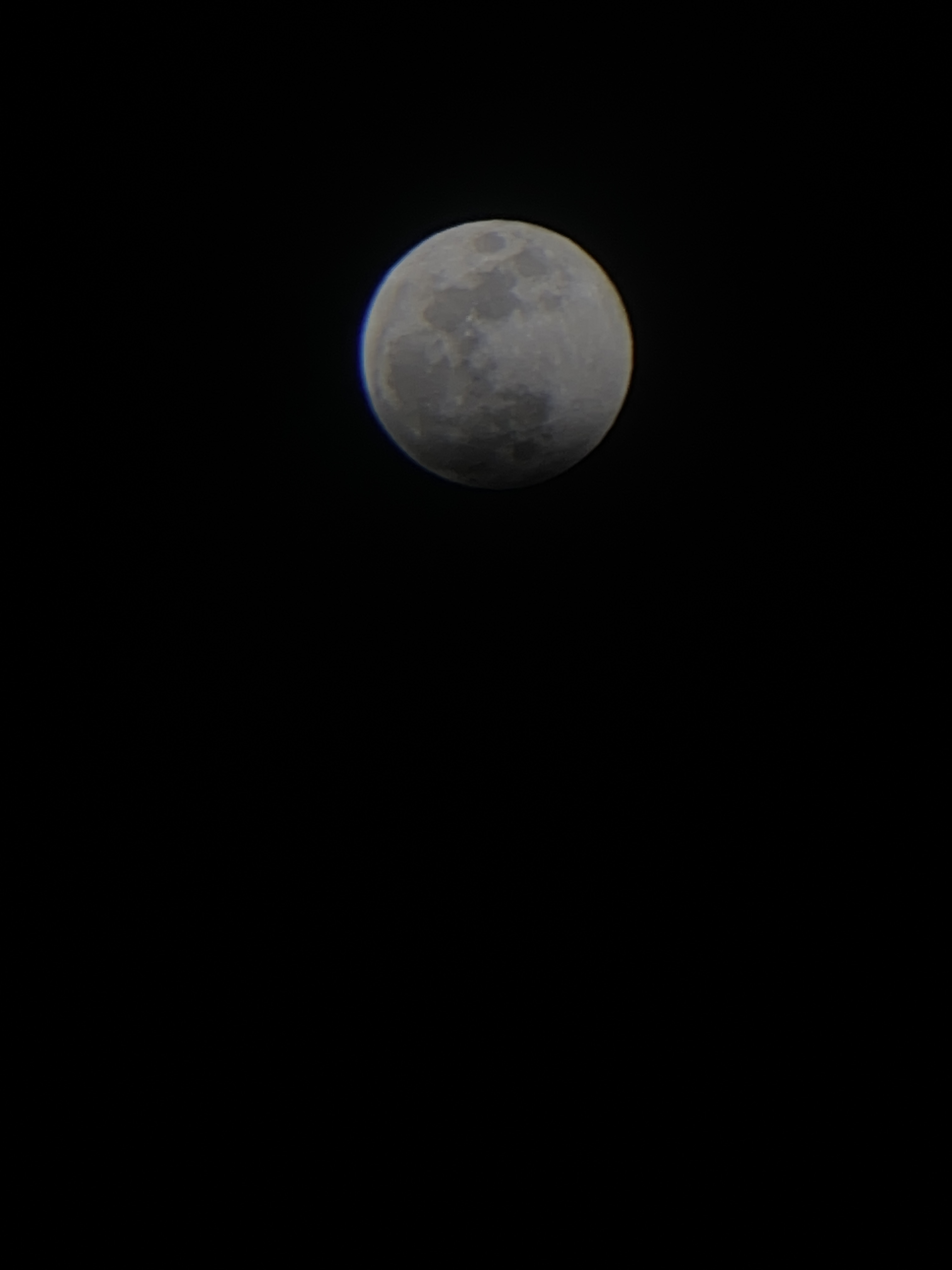
Mexicali, Mexico, shortly before partiality, 5:05 UTC

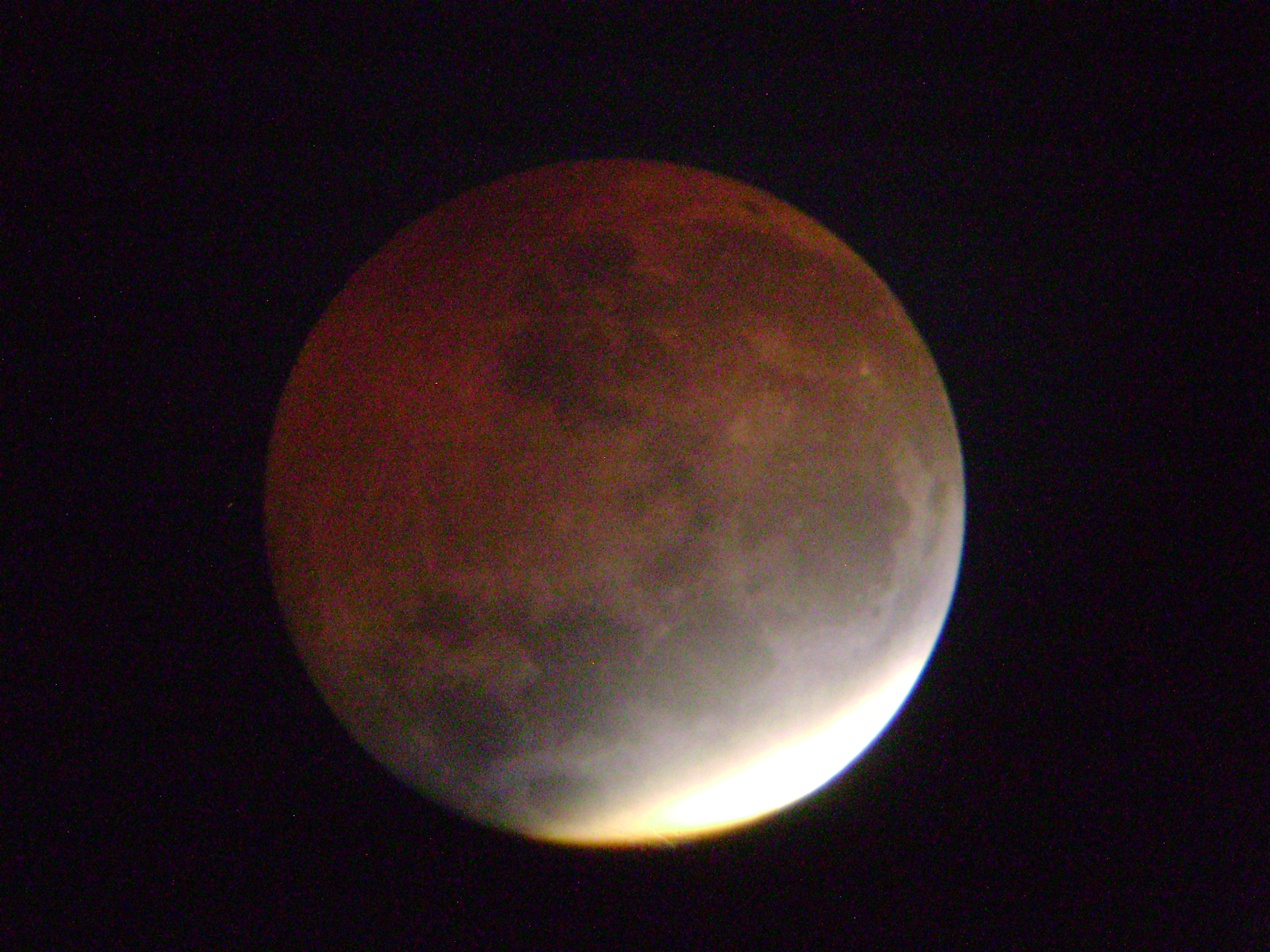
Buenos Aires Province, Argentina, shortly before totality, 6:18 UTC

Laredo, TX, 6:29 UTC

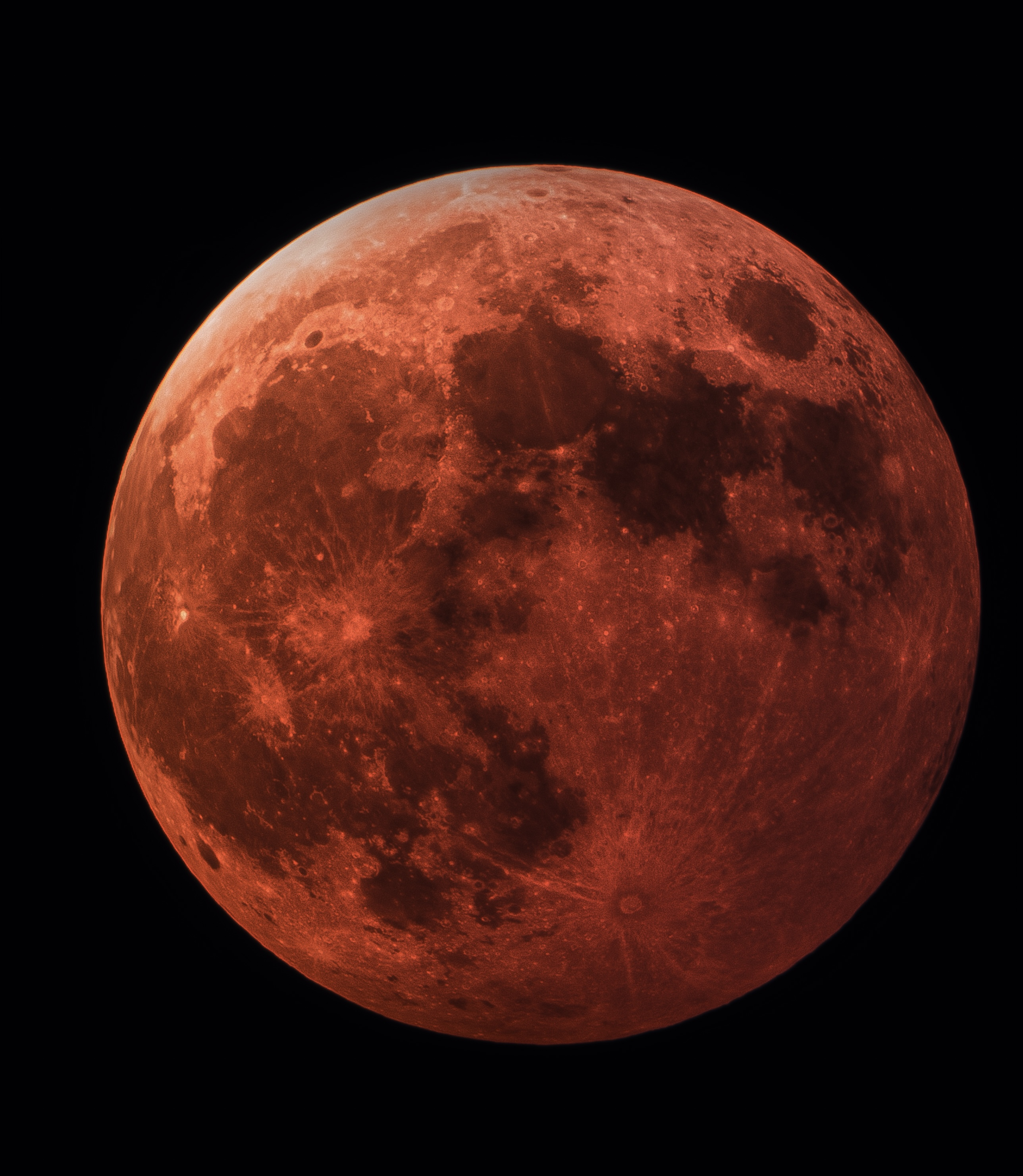
Chillicothe, OH, near maximum

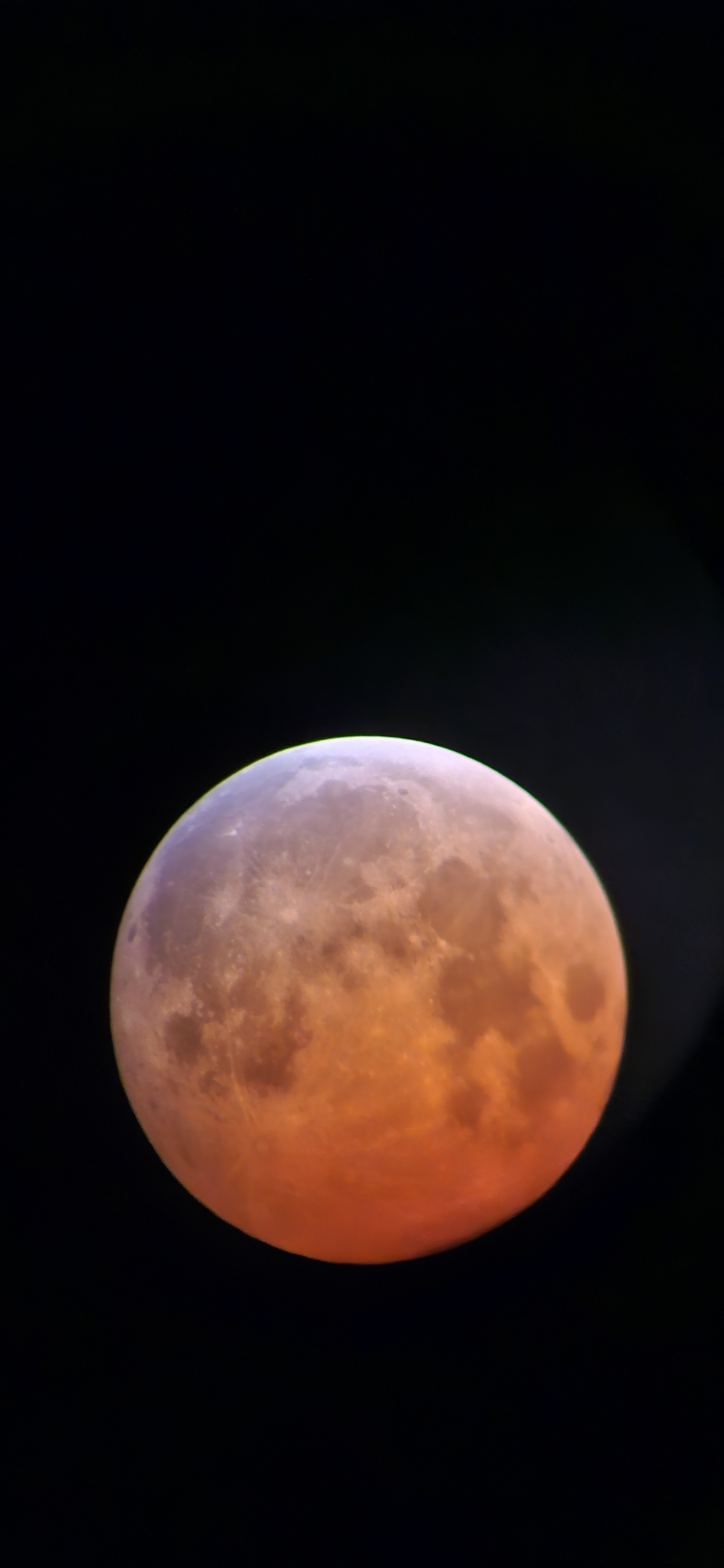
Miamisburg, OH, 7:00 UTC

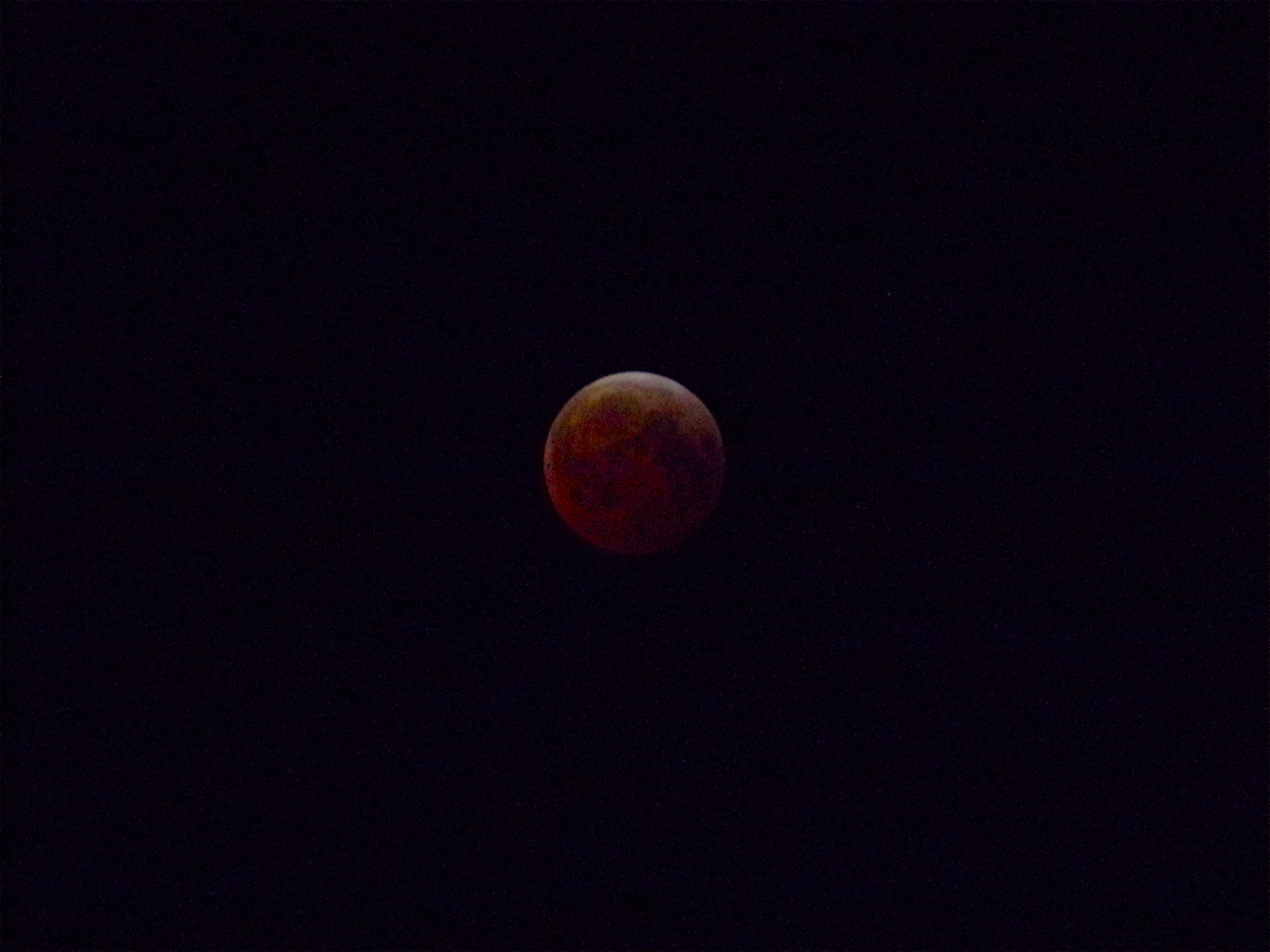
Newberry County, SC, 7:02 UTC

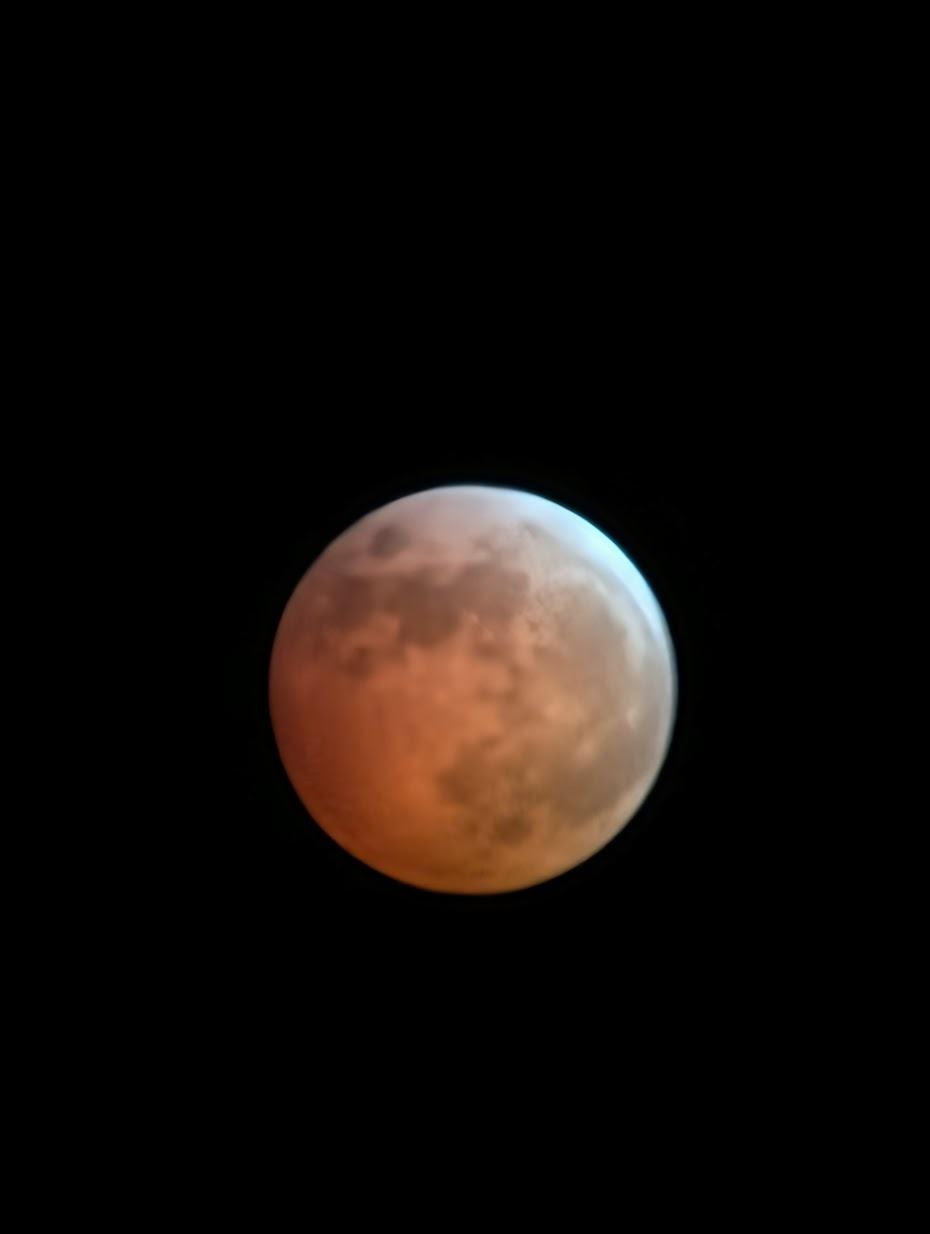
Highland, WA, 7:07 UTC

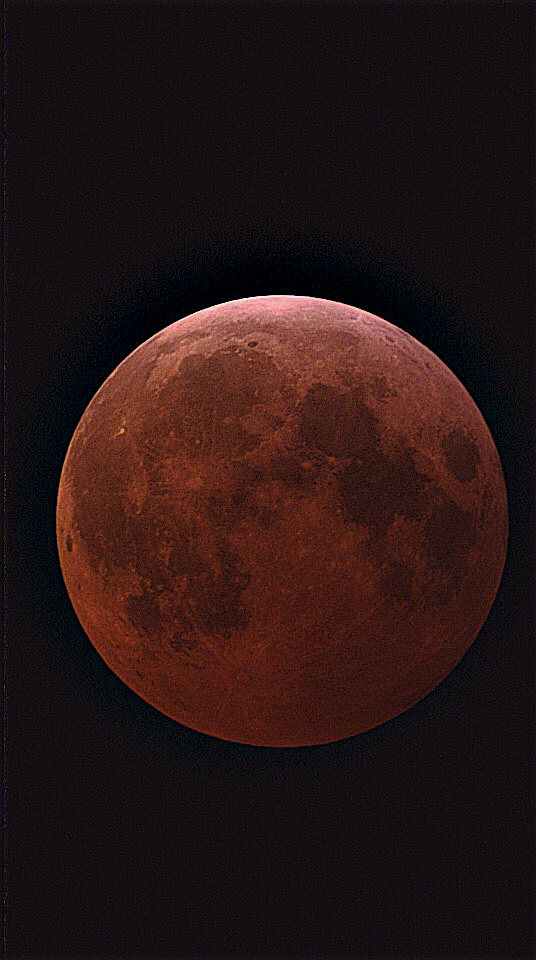
Toronto, ON, 7:10 UTC

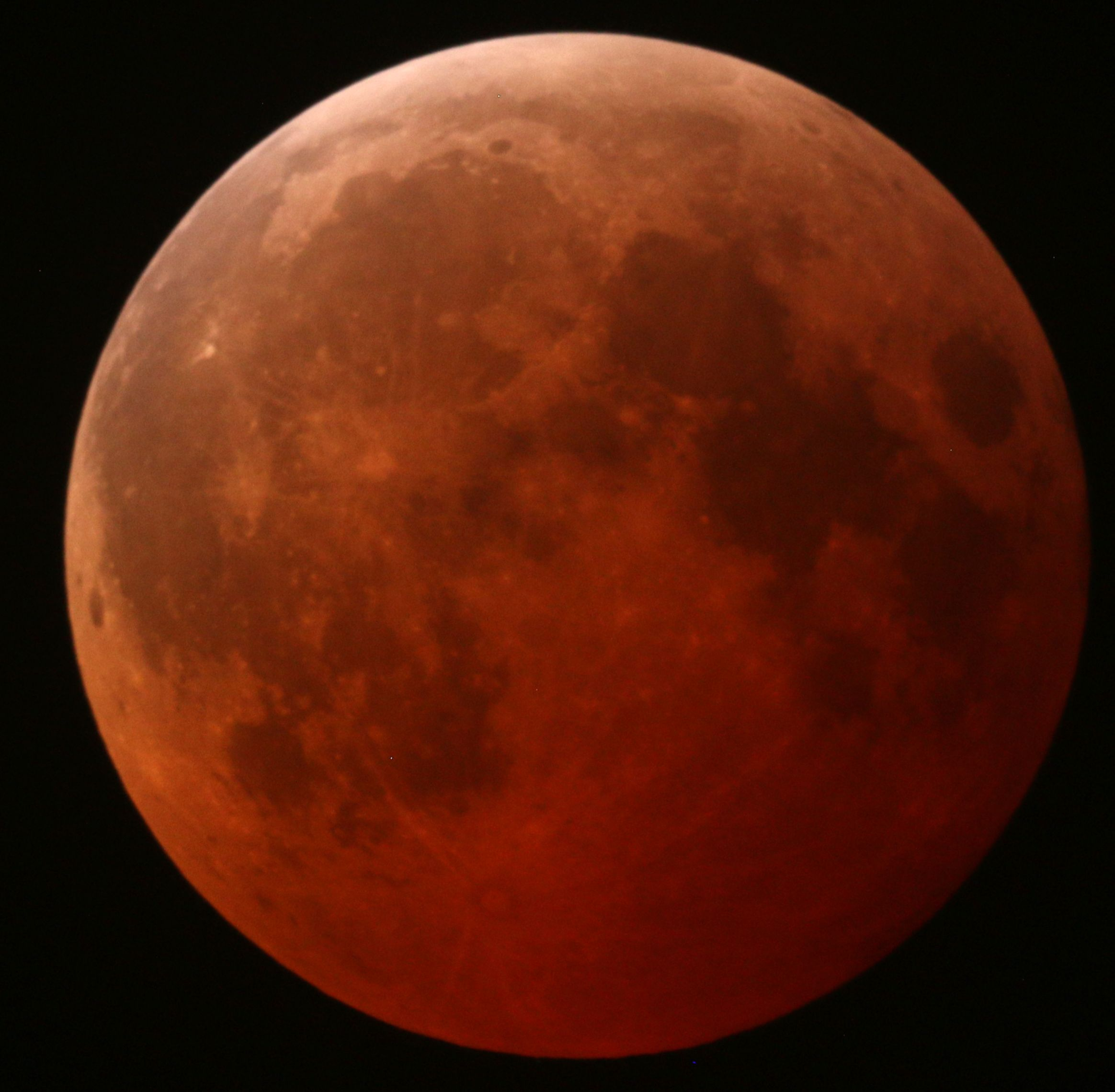
Minneapolis, MN, 7:18 UTC

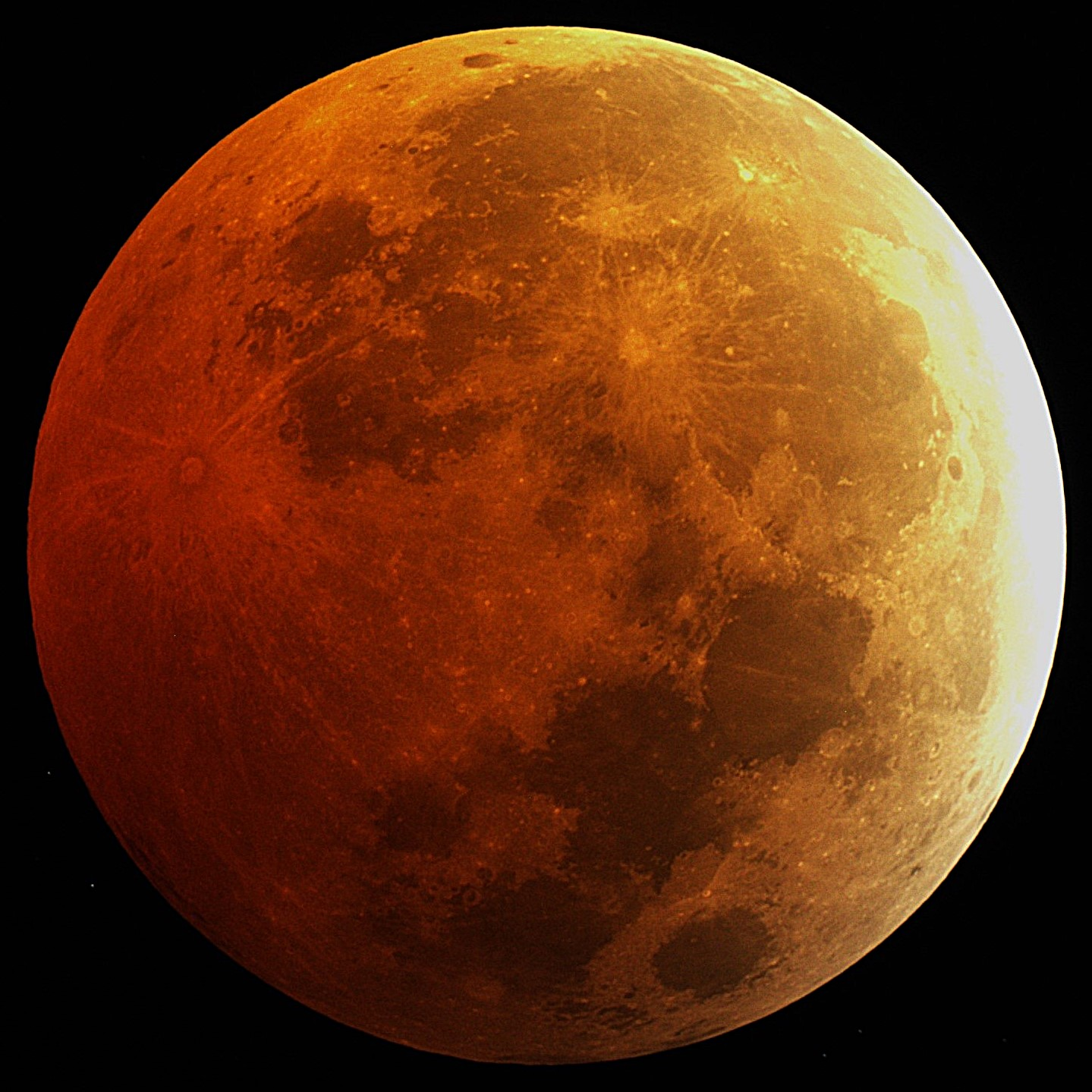
Mar del Plata, Argentina, 7:20 UTC

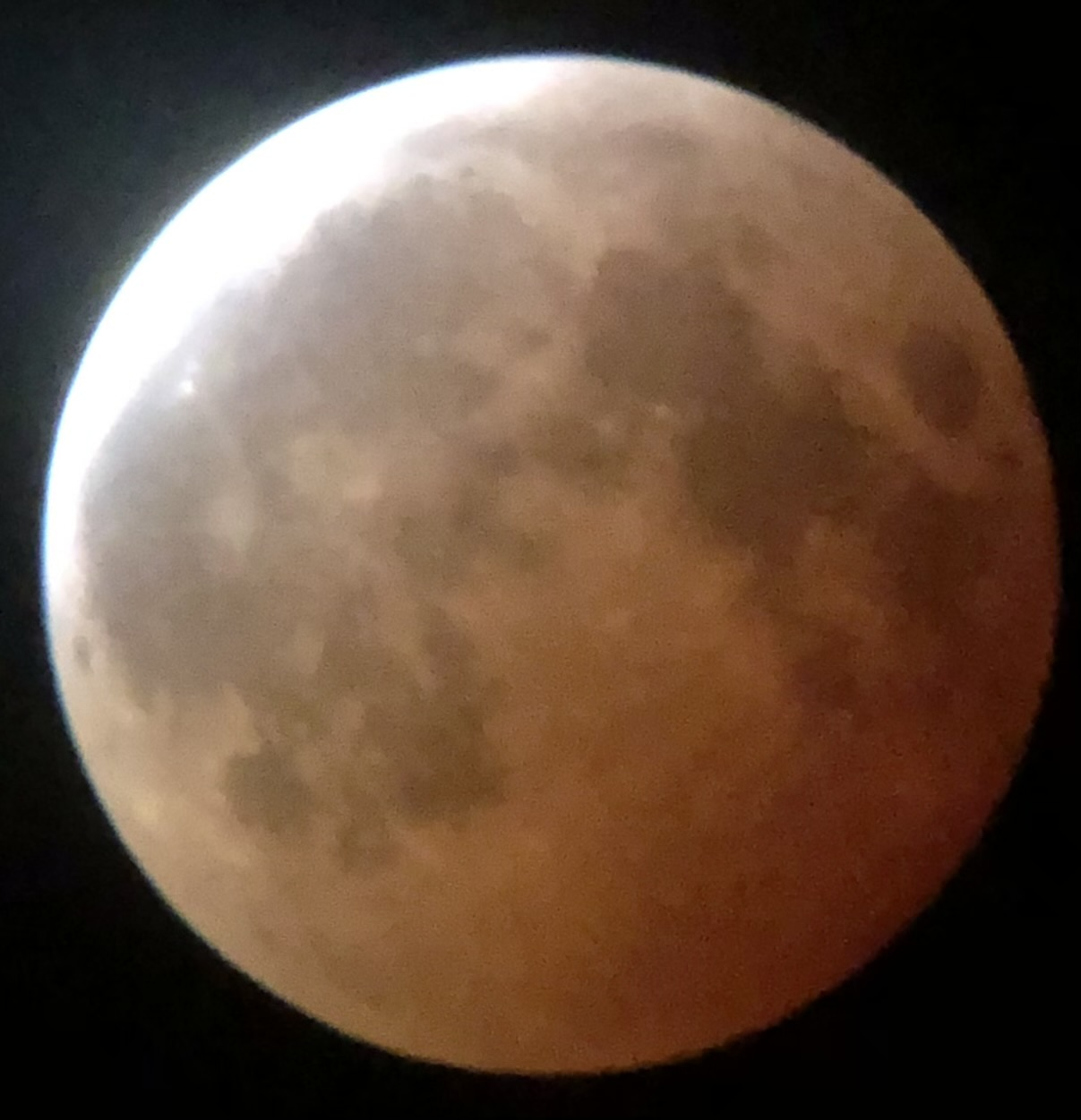
Halifax, NS, 7:35 UTC, shortly after totality

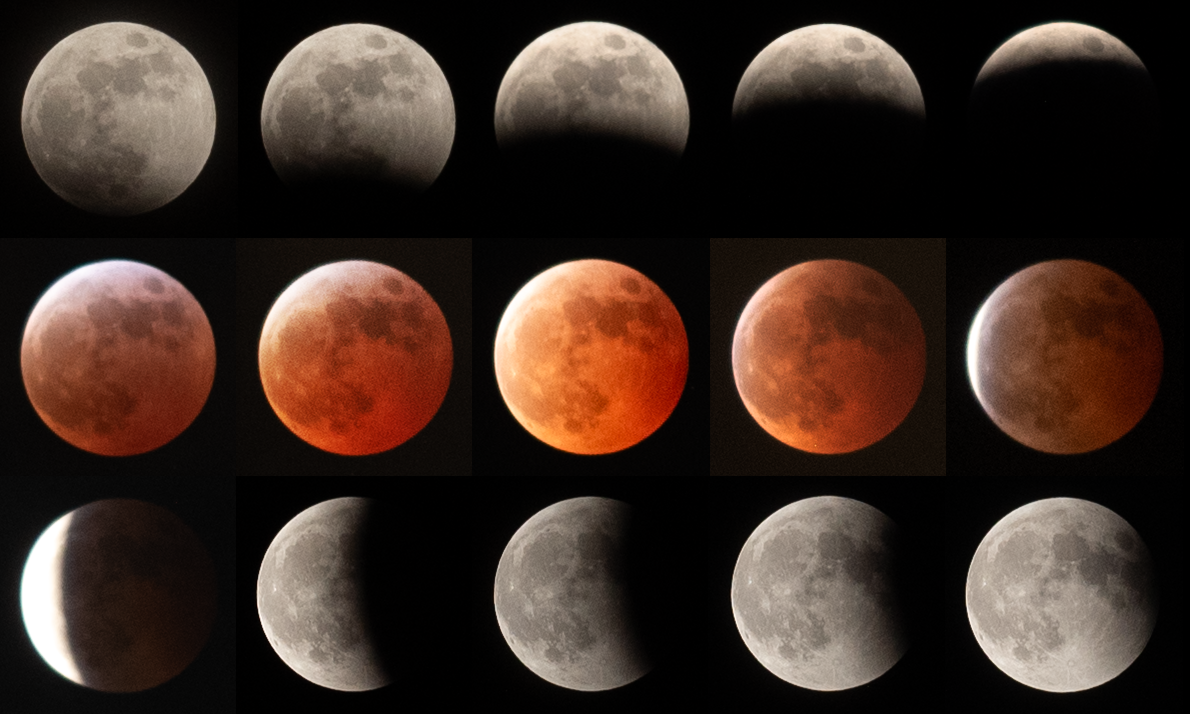
Eclipse progression from North Vancouver City, BC

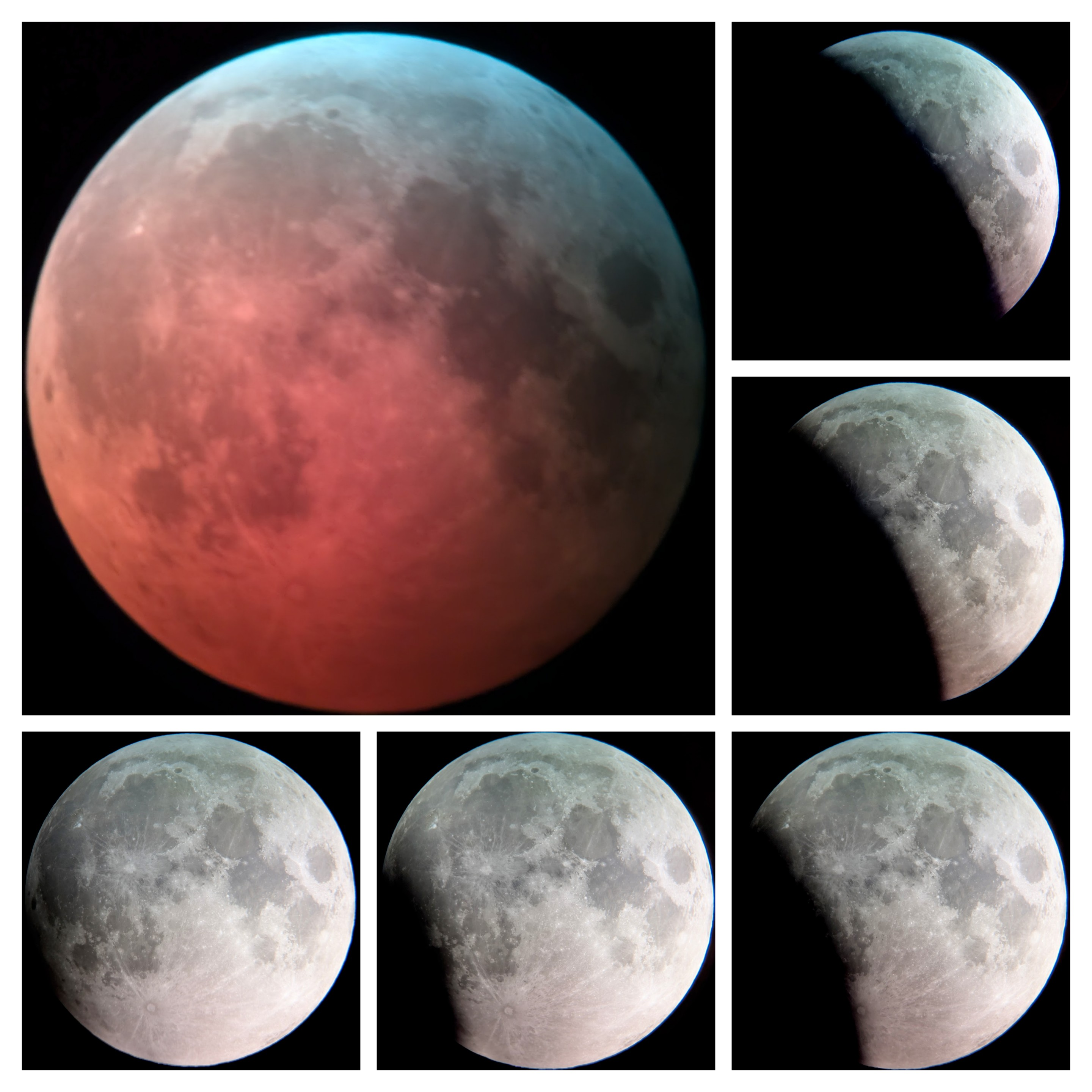
Eclipse collage as seen from Sainte-Anne-de-Bellevue, QC

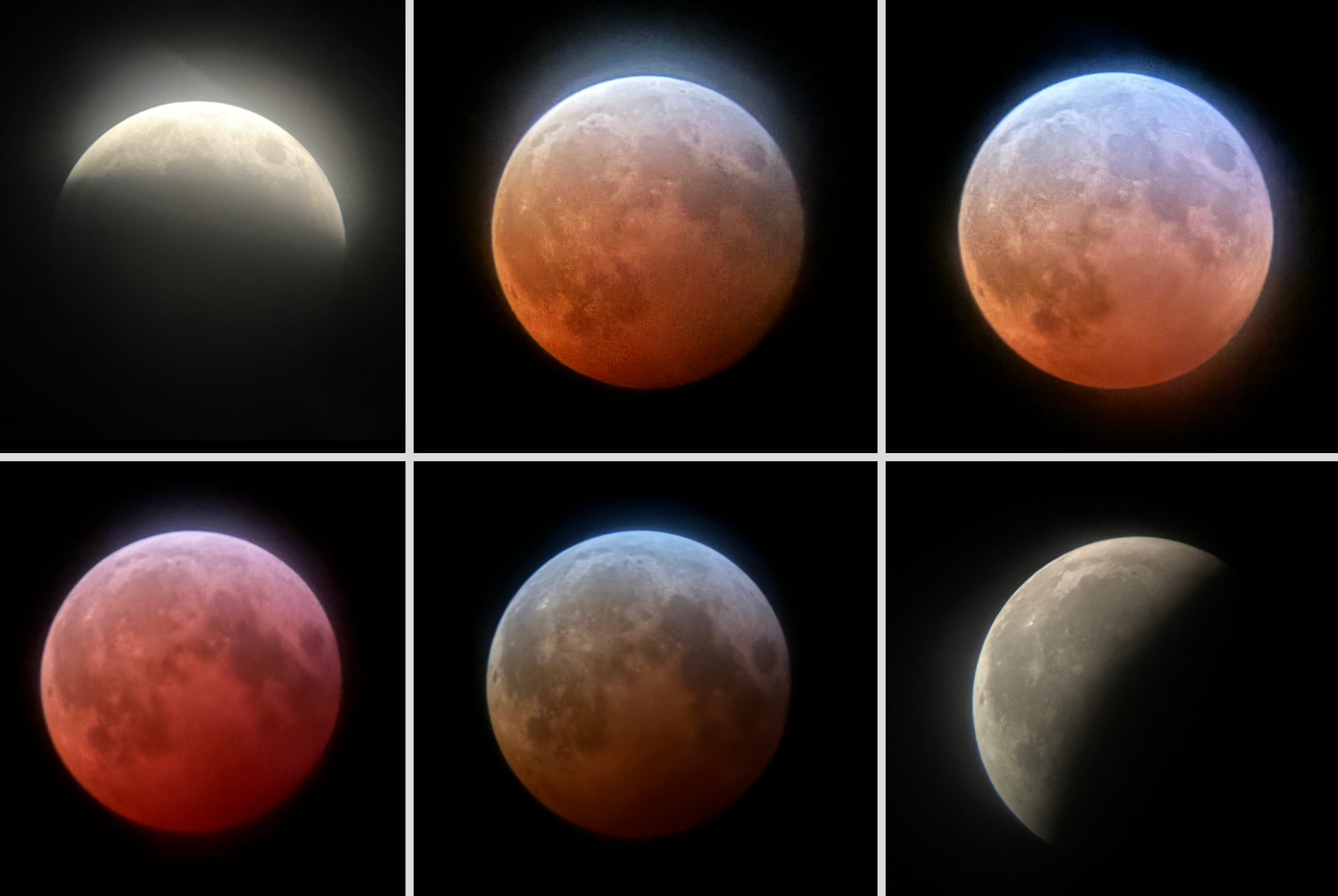
Eclipse collage as seen from Southern Indiana

Video of the eclipse from Mexico City, Mexico

== Eclipse details ==
Shown below is a table displaying details about this particular lunar eclipse. It describes various parameters pertaining to this eclipse.

March 14, 2025 Lunar Eclipse Parameters
Parameter	Value
Penumbral Magnitude	2.26146
Umbral Magnitude	1.18038
Gamma	0.34846
Sun Right Ascension	23h37m46.0s
Sun Declination	-02°24'16.8"
Sun Semi-Diameter	16'05.2"
Sun Equatorial Horizontal Parallax	08.8"
Moon Right Ascension	11h38m23.0s
Moon Declination	+02°40'54.6"
Moon Semi-Diameter	14'52.8"
Moon Equatorial Horizontal Parallax	0°54'36.8"
ΔT	69.1 s

== Eclipse season ==
This eclipse is part of an eclipse season, a period, roughly every six months, when eclipses occur. Each season lasts about 35 days and repeats just short of six months (173 days) later; thus two full eclipse seasons always occur each calendar year and part of a third may occur. Either two or three eclipses happen each eclipse season. In the sequence below, each eclipse is separated by a fortnight.

Eclipse season of March 2025
March 14 Descending node (full moon)	March 29 Ascending node (new moon)
Total lunar eclipse Lunar Saros 123	Partial solar eclipse Solar Saros 149

== Related eclipses ==
=== Eclipses in 2025 ===
- A total lunar eclipse on March 14.
- A partial solar eclipse on March 29.
- A total lunar eclipse on September 7.
- A partial solar eclipse on September 21.

=== Metonic ===
- Preceded by: Lunar eclipse of May 26, 2021
- Followed by: Lunar eclipse of December 31, 2028

=== Tzolkinex ===
- Preceded by: Lunar eclipse of January 31, 2018
- Followed by: Lunar eclipse of April 25, 2032

=== Half-Saros ===
- Preceded by: Solar eclipse of March 9, 2016
- Followed by: Solar eclipse of March 20, 2034

=== Tritos ===
- Preceded by: Lunar eclipse of April 15, 2014
- Followed by: Lunar eclipse of February 11, 2036

=== Lunar Saros 123 ===
- Preceded by: Lunar eclipse of March 3, 2007
- Followed by: Lunar eclipse of March 25, 2043

=== Inex ===
- Preceded by: Lunar eclipse of April 4, 1996
- Followed by: Lunar eclipse of February 22, 2054

=== Triad ===
- Preceded by: Lunar eclipse of May 14, 1938
- Followed by: Lunar eclipse of January 14, 2112

=== Lunar eclipses of 2024–2027 ===
This eclipse is a member of a semester series. An eclipse in a semester series of lunar eclipses repeats approximately every 177 days and 4 hours (a semester) at alternating nodes of the Moon's orbit.

The penumbral lunar eclipse on July 18, 2027 occurs in the next lunar year eclipse set.

Lunar eclipse series sets from 2024 to 2027
Descending node				Ascending node			
Saros	Date Viewing	Type Chart	Gamma	Saros	Date Viewing	Type Chart	Gamma
113	2024 Mar 25	Penumbral	1.0610	118	2024 Sep 18	Partial	−0.9792
123	2025 Mar 14	Total	0.3485	128	2025 Sep 07	Total	−0.2752
133	2026 Mar 03	Total	−0.3765	138	2026 Aug 28	Partial	0.4964
143	2027 Feb 20	Penumbral	−1.0480	148	2027 Aug 17	Penumbral	1.2797

=== Metonic series ===
The Metonic cycle repeats nearly exactly every 19 years and represents a Saros cycle plus one lunar year. Because it occurs on the same calendar date, the Earth's shadow will in nearly the same location relative to the background stars.

1. 2006 Mar 14.99 - penumbral (113); 2. 2025 Mar 14.29 - total (123); 3. 2044 Mar 13.82 - total (133); 4. 2063 Mar 14.67- partial (143)	1. 2006 Sep 07.79 - partial (118); 2. 2025 Sep 07.76 - total (128); 3. 2044 Sep 07.47 - partial (138); 4. 2063 Sep 07.86 - penumbral (148)

=== Saros 123 ===
This eclipse is a part of Saros series 123, repeating every 18 years, 11 days, and containing 72 events. The series started with a penumbral lunar eclipse on August 16, 1087. It contains partial eclipses from May 2, 1520 through July 6, 1610; total eclipses from July 16, 1628 through April 4, 2061; and a second set of partial eclipses from April 16, 2079 through July 2, 2205. The series ends at member 72 as a penumbral eclipse on October 8, 2367.

The longest duration of totality was produced by member 37 at 105 minutes, 58 seconds on September 20, 1736. All eclipses in this series occur at the Moon’s descending node of orbit.

Greatest	First			
The greatest eclipse of the series occurred on 1736 Sep 20, lasting 105 minutes, 58 seconds.	Penumbral	Partial	Total	Central
The greatest eclipse of the series occurred on 1736 Sep 20, lasting 105 minutes, 58 seconds.	1087 Aug 16	1520 May 02	1628 Jul 16	1682 Aug 18
The greatest eclipse of the series occurred on 1736 Sep 20, lasting 105 minutes, 58 seconds.	Last			
The greatest eclipse of the series occurred on 1736 Sep 20, lasting 105 minutes, 58 seconds.	Central	Total	Partial	Penumbral
The greatest eclipse of the series occurred on 1736 Sep 20, lasting 105 minutes, 58 seconds.	1953 Jan 29	2061 Apr 04	2205 Jul 02	2367 Oct 08

Eclipses are tabulated in three columns; every third eclipse in the same column is one exeligmos apart, so they all cast shadows over approximately the same parts of the Earth.

Series members 41–62 occur between 1801 and 2200:
41	42	43
1808 Nov 03	1826 Nov 14	1844 Nov 24
44	45	46
1862 Dec 06	1880 Dec 16	1898 Dec 27
47	48	49
1917 Jan 08	1935 Jan 19	1953 Jan 29
50	51	52
1971 Feb 10	1989 Feb 20	2007 Mar 03
53	54	55
2025 Mar 14	2043 Mar 25	2061 Apr 04
56	57	58
2079 Apr 16	2097 Apr 26	2115 May 08
59	60	61
2133 May 19	2151 May 30	2169 Jun 09
62
2187 Jun 20

=== Tritos series ===
This eclipse is a part of a tritos cycle, repeating at alternating nodes every 135 synodic months (≈ 3986.63 days, or 11 years minus 1 month). Their appearance and longitude are irregular due to a lack of synchronization with the anomalistic month (period of perigee), but groupings of 3 tritos cycles (≈ 33 years minus 3 months) come close (≈ 434.044 anomalistic months), so eclipses are similar in these groupings.

Series members between 1801 and 2200
1806 Nov 26 (Saros 103)		1828 Sep 23 (Saros 105)	1839 Aug 24 (Saros 106)	1850 Jul 24 (Saros 107)
1861 Jun 22 (Saros 108)	1872 May 22 (Saros 109)	1883 Apr 22 (Saros 110)	1894 Mar 21 (Saros 111)	1905 Feb 19 (Saros 112)
1916 Jan 20 (Saros 113)	1926 Dec 19 (Saros 114)	1937 Nov 18 (Saros 115)	1948 Oct 18 (Saros 116)	1959 Sep 17 (Saros 117)
1970 Aug 17 (Saros 118)	1981 Jul 17 (Saros 119)	1992 Jun 15 (Saros 120)	2003 May 16 (Saros 121)	2014 Apr 15 (Saros 122)
2025 Mar 14 (Saros 123)	2036 Feb 11 (Saros 124)	2047 Jan 12 (Saros 125)	2057 Dec 11 (Saros 126)	2068 Nov 09 (Saros 127)
2079 Oct 10 (Saros 128)	2090 Sep 08 (Saros 129)	2101 Aug 09 (Saros 130)	2112 Jul 09 (Saros 131)	2123 Jun 09 (Saros 132)
2134 May 08 (Saros 133)	2145 Apr 07 (Saros 134)	2156 Mar 07 (Saros 135)	2167 Feb 04 (Saros 136)	2178 Jan 04 (Saros 137)
2188 Dec 04 (Saros 138)	2199 Nov 02 (Saros 139)			

=== Inex series ===
This eclipse is a part of the long period inex cycle, repeating at alternating nodes, every 358 synodic months (≈ 10,571.95 days, or 29 years minus 20 days). Their appearance and longitude are irregular due to a lack of synchronization with the anomalistic month (period of perigee). However, groupings of 3 inex cycles (≈ 87 years minus 2 months) comes close (≈ 1,151.02 anomalistic months), so eclipses are similar in these groupings.

Series members between 1801 and 2200
1822 Aug 03 (Saros 116)	1851 Jul 13 (Saros 117)	1880 Jun 22 (Saros 118)
1909 Jun 04 (Saros 119)	1938 May 14 (Saros 120)	1967 Apr 24 (Saros 121)
1996 Apr 04 (Saros 122)	2025 Mar 14 (Saros 123)	2054 Feb 22 (Saros 124)
2083 Feb 02 (Saros 125)	2112 Jan 14 (Saros 126)	2140 Dec 23 (Saros 127)
2169 Dec 04 (Saros 128)	2198 Nov 13 (Saros 129)	

=== Half-Saros cycle ===
A lunar eclipse will be preceded and followed by solar eclipses by 9 years and 5.5 days (a half saros). Related to Solar Saros 130.

March 9, 2016	March 20, 2034

== See also ==
- List of 21st-century lunar eclipses
- Lists of lunar eclipses
