= September 2025 lunar eclipse =

Total lunar eclipse

- Total eclipse
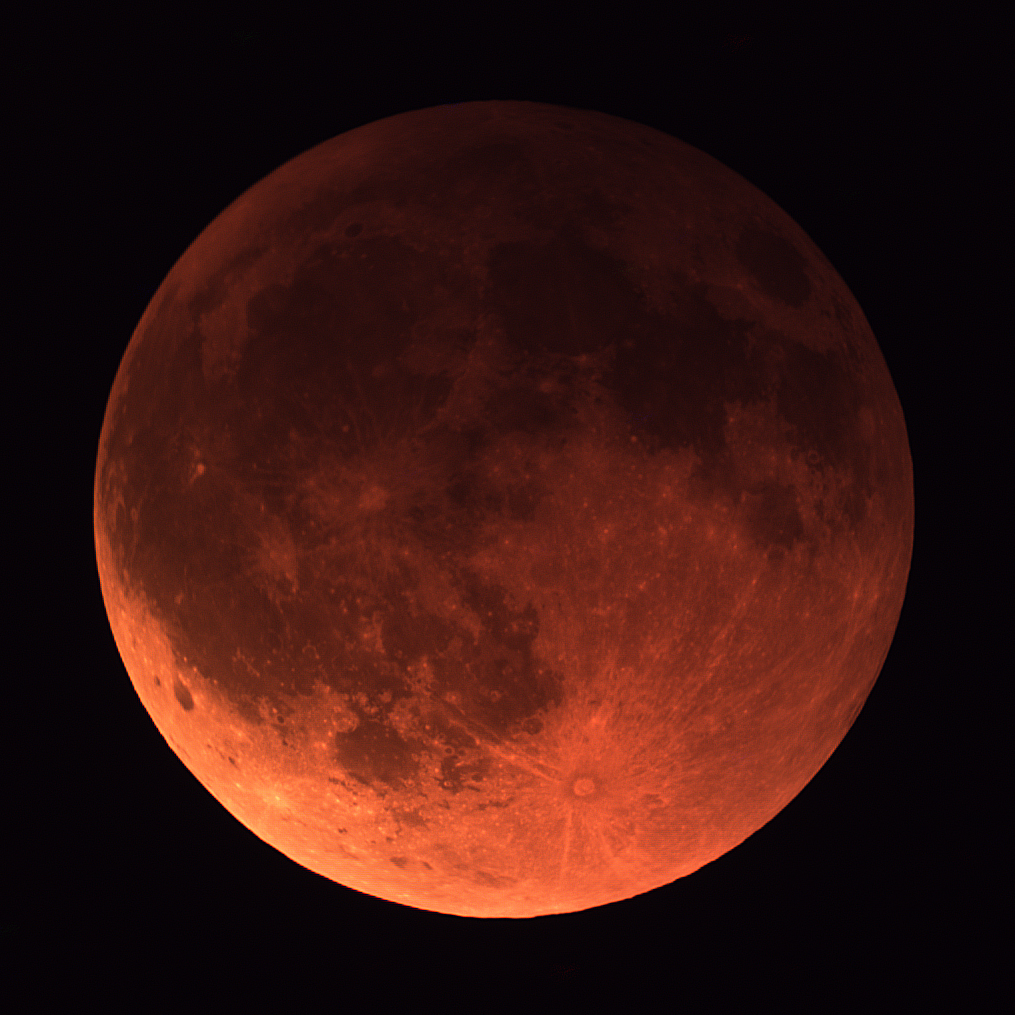
- Totality viewed from Ukraine, at 18:30 UTC
- Date: September 7, 2025
- Gamma: −0.2752
- Magnitude: 1.3638
- Saros cycle: 128 (41 of 71)
- Totality: 82 minutes, 6 seconds
- Partiality: 209 minutes, 24 seconds
- Penumbral: 326 minutes, 40 seconds
Contacts (UTC)
- P1: 15:28:21
- U1: 16:27:02
- U2: 17:30:41
- Greatest: 18:11:43
- U3: 18:52:47
- U4: 19:56:26
- P4: 20:55:00

A total lunar eclipse occurred at the Moon's ascending node of orbit on Sunday, September 7, 2025, with an umbral magnitude of 1.3638. A lunar eclipse occurs when the Moon moves into the Earth's shadow, causing the Moon to be darkened. A total lunar eclipse occurs when the Moon's near side entirely passes into the Earth's umbral shadow. Unlike a solar eclipse, which can only be viewed from a relatively small area of the world, a lunar eclipse may be viewed from anywhere on the night side of Earth. A total lunar eclipse can last up to nearly two hours, while a total solar eclipse lasts only a few minutes at any given place, because the Moon's shadow is smaller. Occurring about 2.6 days before perigee (on Wednesday, September 10, 2025, at 8:10 UTC), the Moon's apparent diameter was larger.

This lunar eclipse was the second of an almost tetrad, with the others being on March 14, 2025 (total); March 3, 2026 (total); and August 28, 2026 (partial).

== Visibility ==
The eclipse was completely visible over east Africa, Asia, and central and west Australia. It was seen when rising over most of Africa and Europe, and when setting over the central Pacific Ocean.

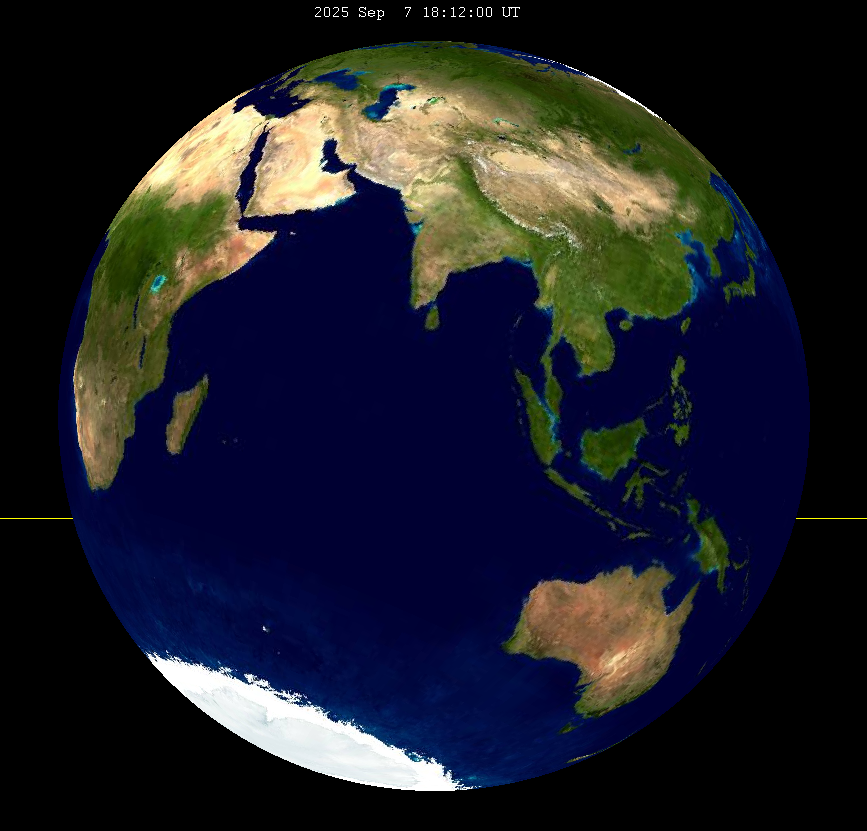
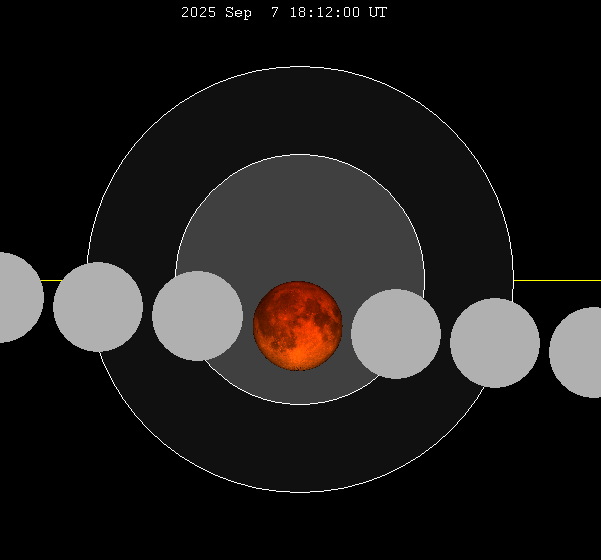
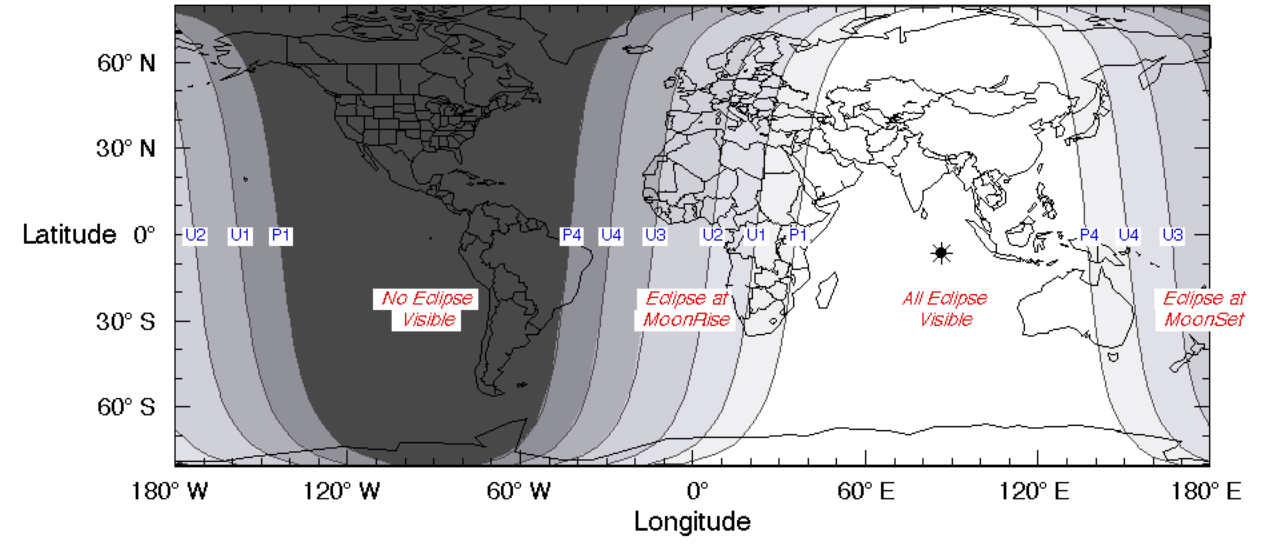
Visibility map

== Gallery ==
Timelapse video from Sayada, Tunisia

Eclipse animation as seen from Belfort, France

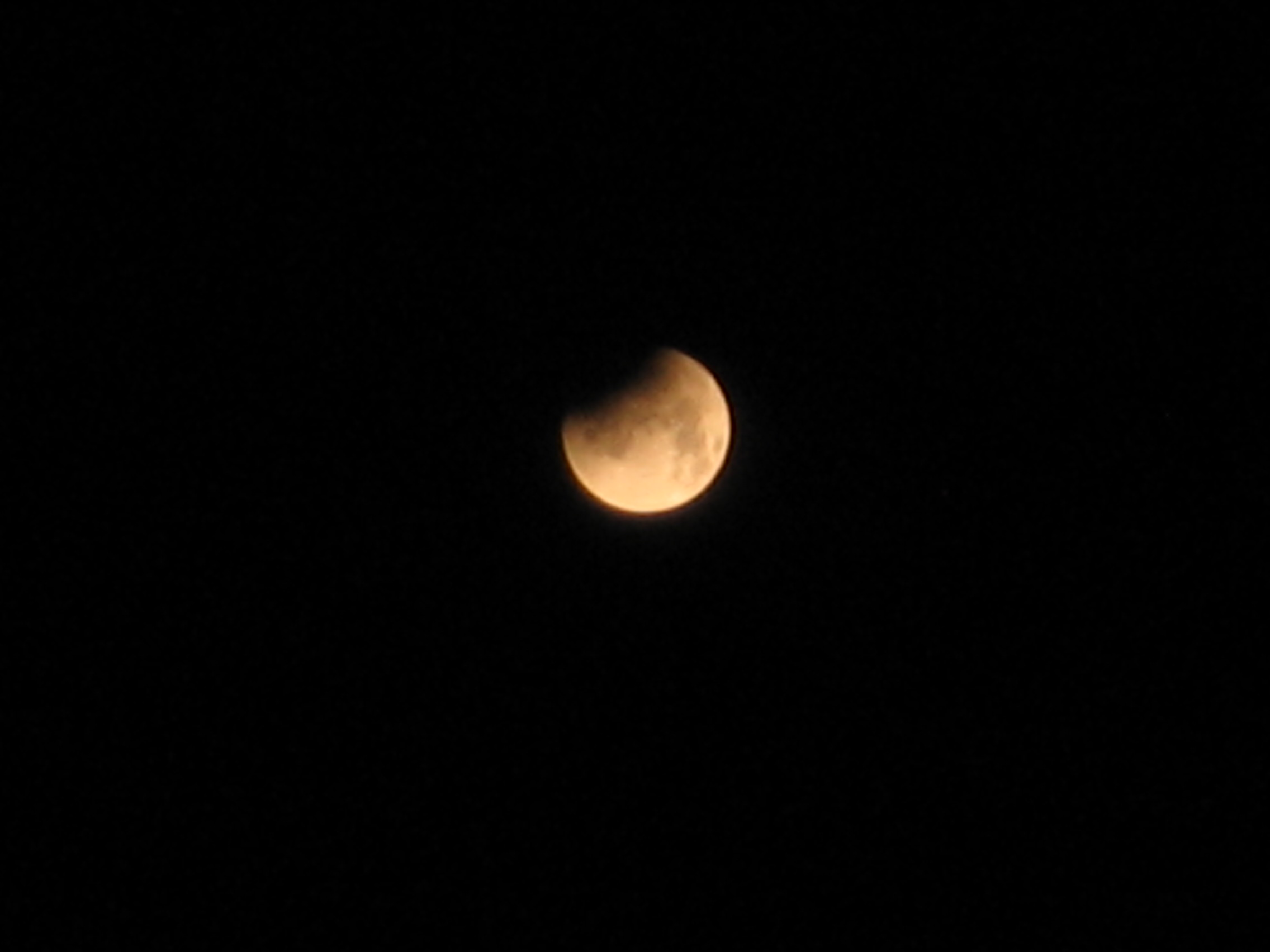
Partial from Hefei, China, 16:37 UTC

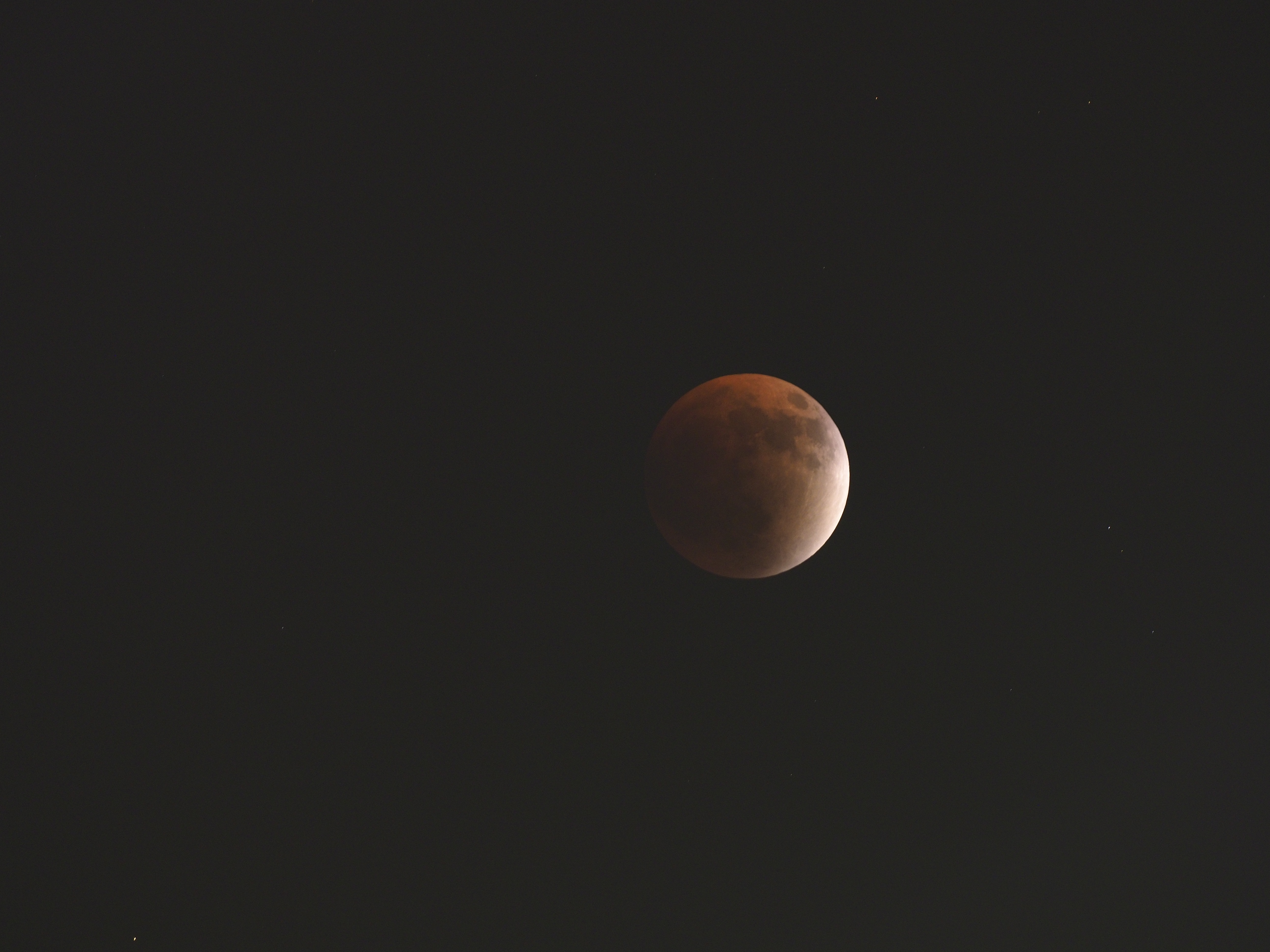
Riyadh, Saudi Arabia, 17:32 UTC

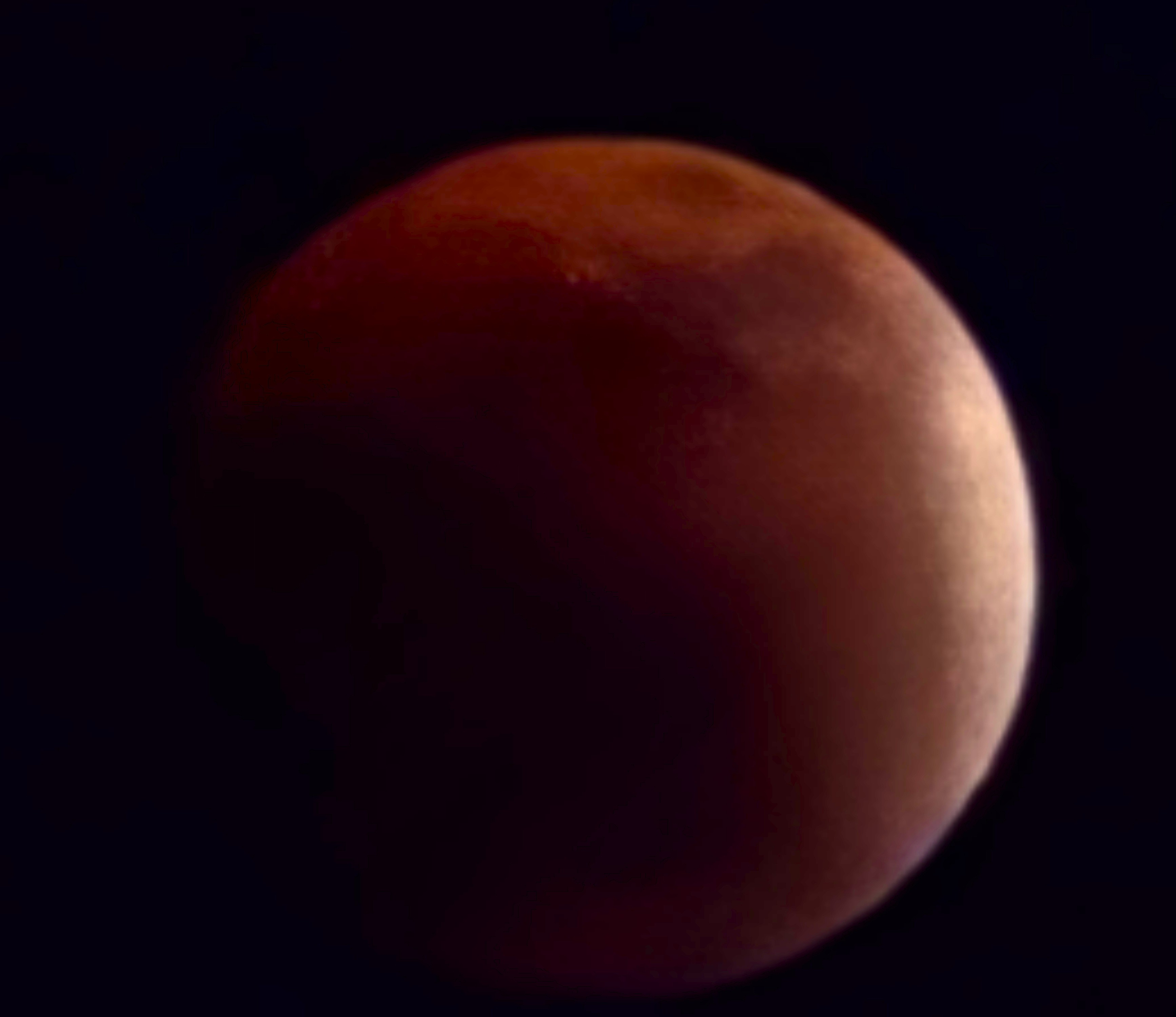
Chiang Rai, Thailand, 17:37 UTC

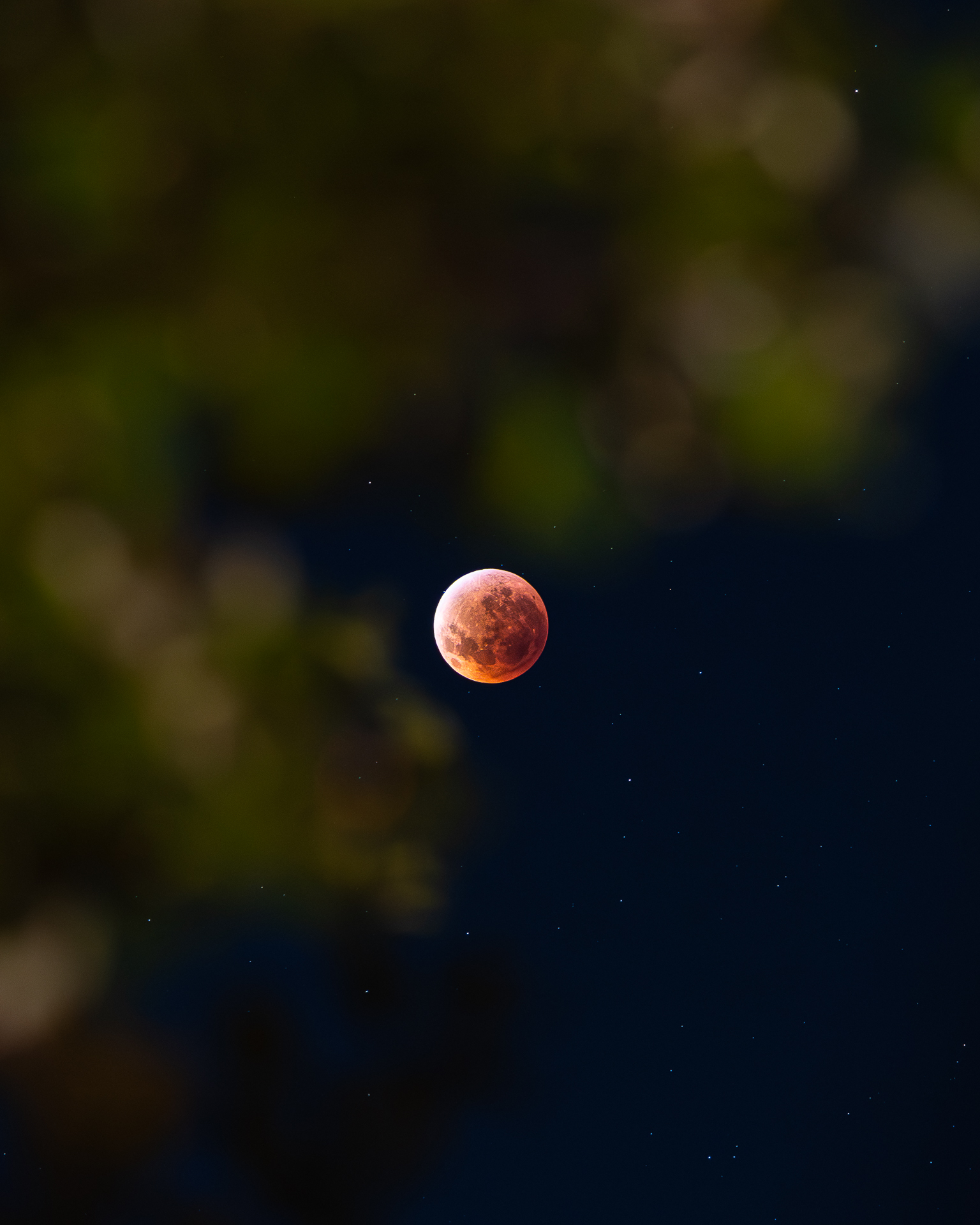
Melbourne, Australia, 17:49 UTC

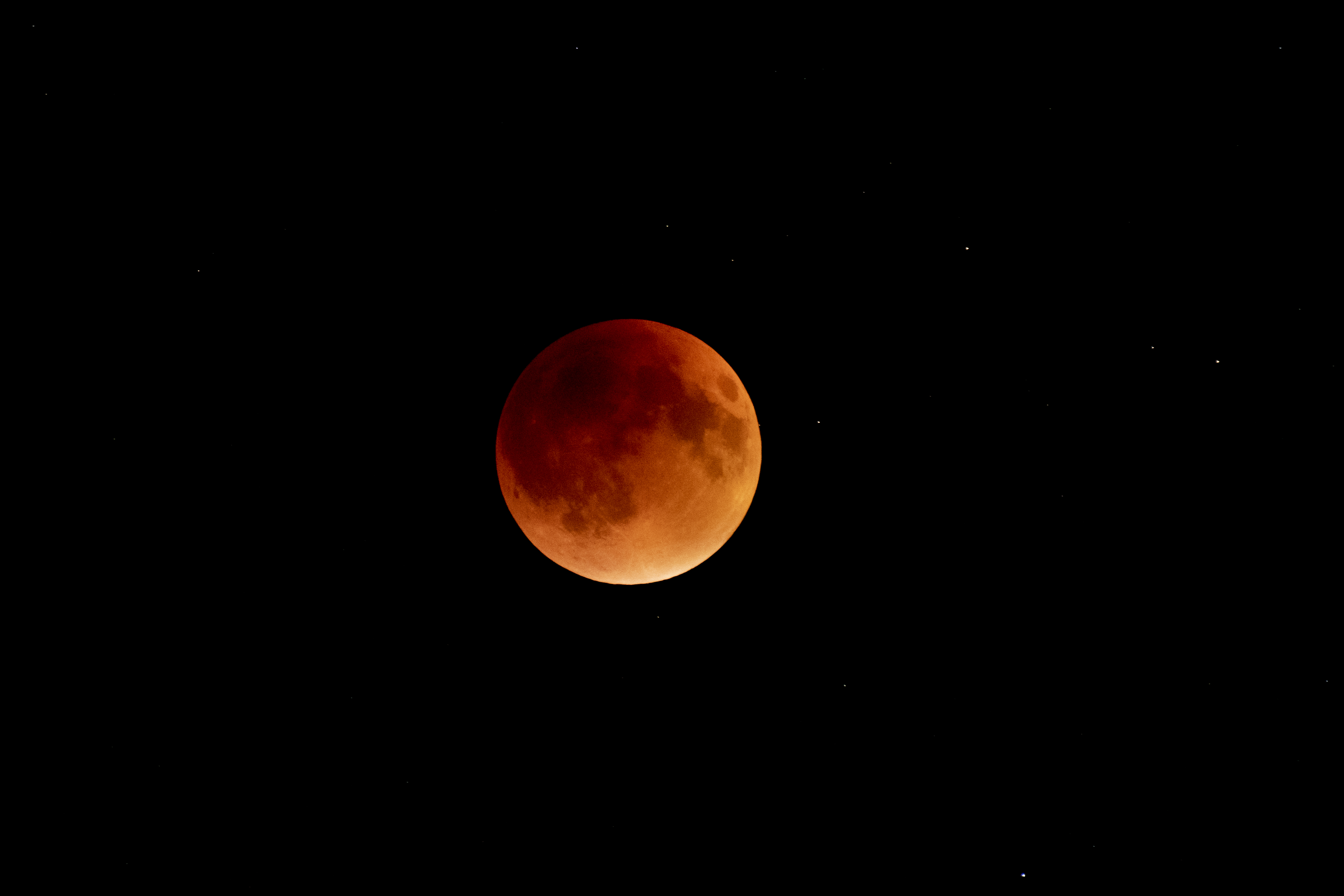
Aralam, India, 17:57 UTC

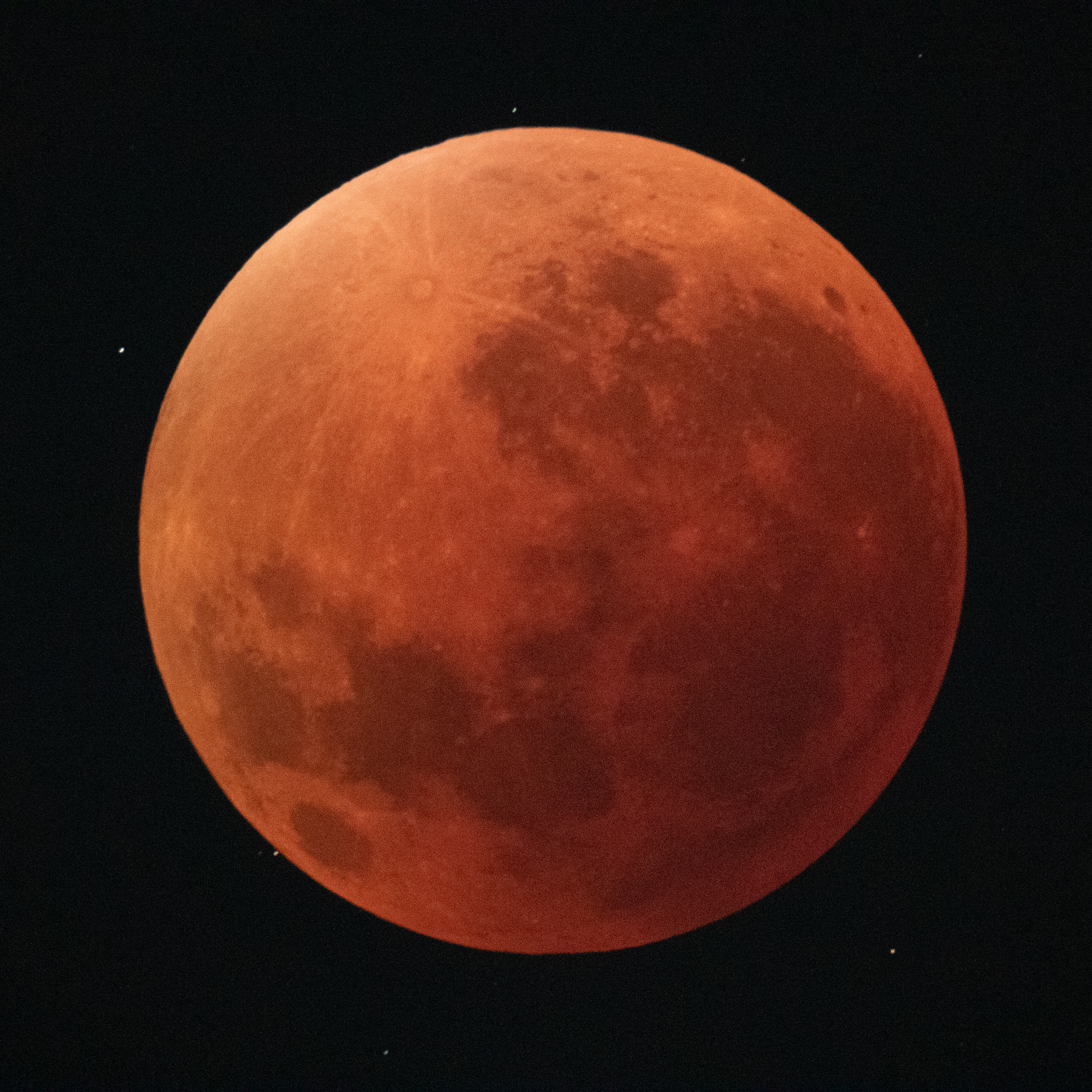
Sydney, Australia, 18:09 UTC

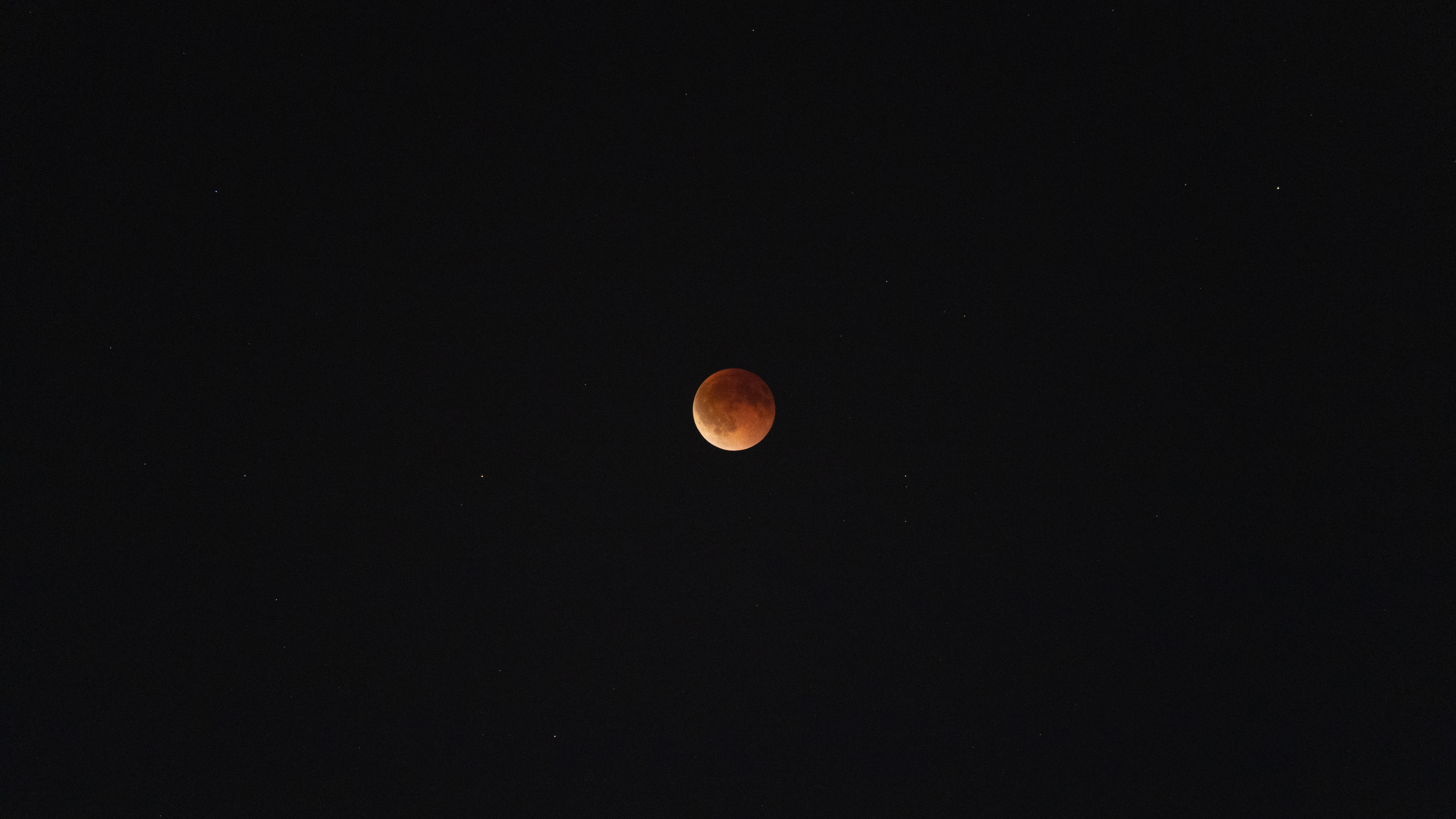
Tehran, Iran, 18:28 UTC

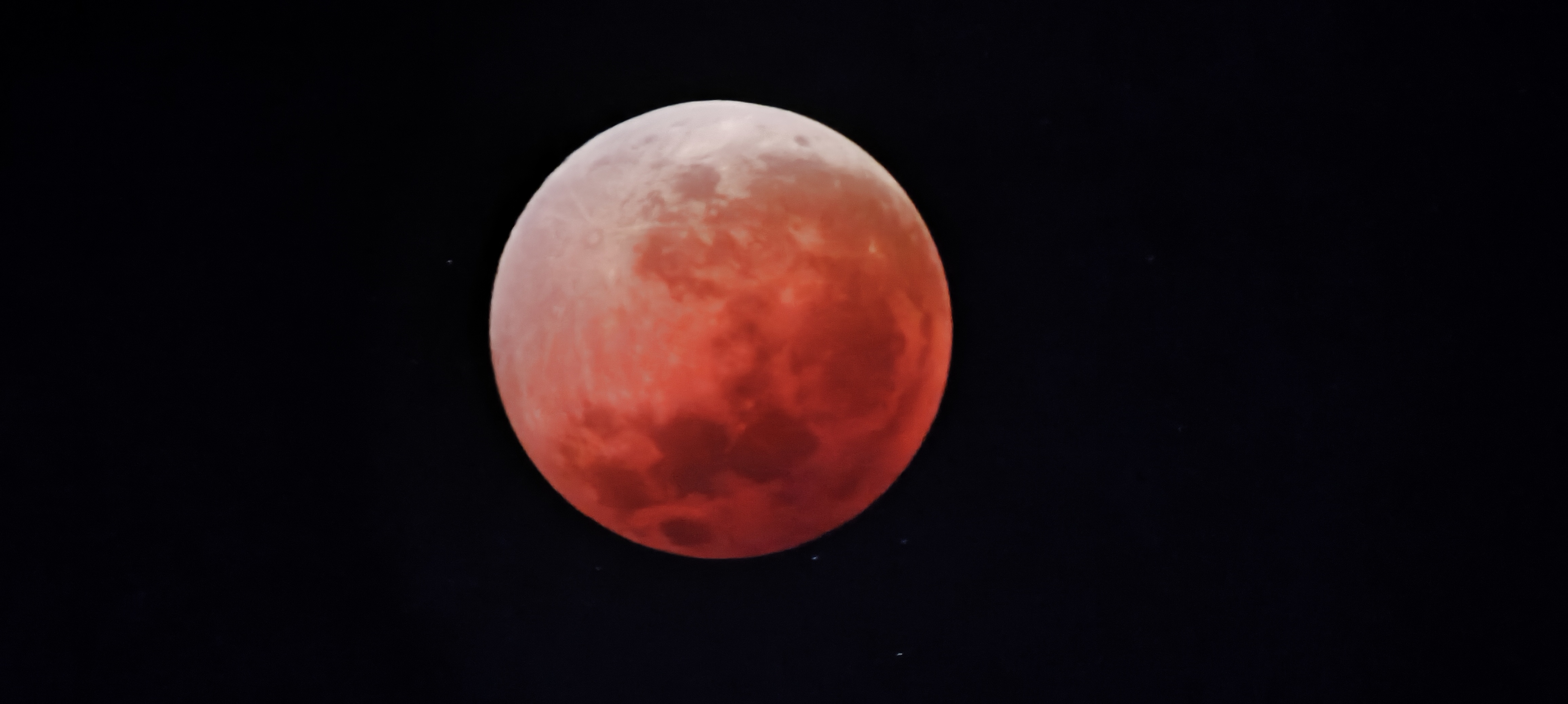
Blitar, Indonesia, 18:33 UTC

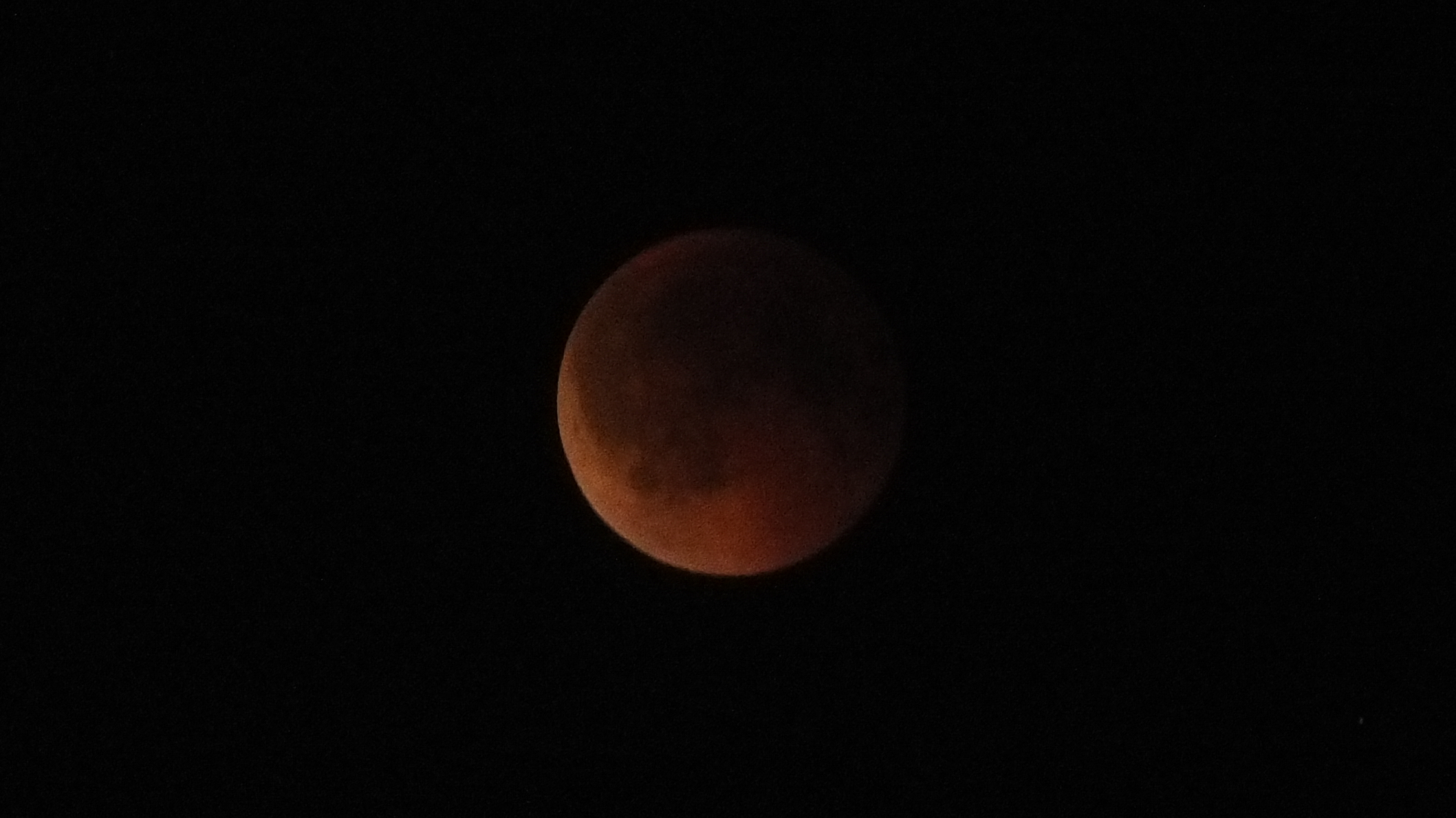
Moscow, Russia, 18:45 UTC

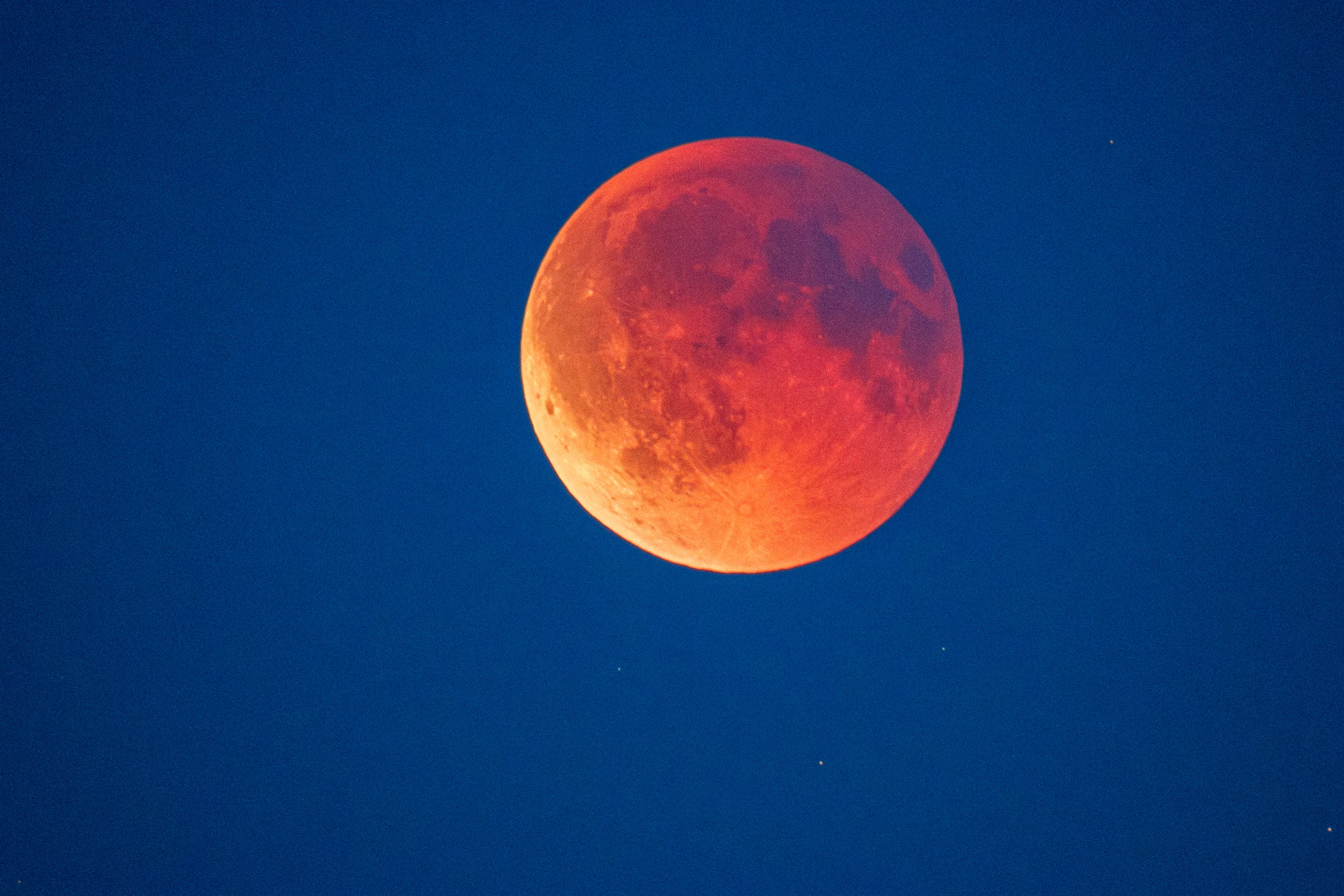
Copenhagen, Denmark, 18:45 UTC

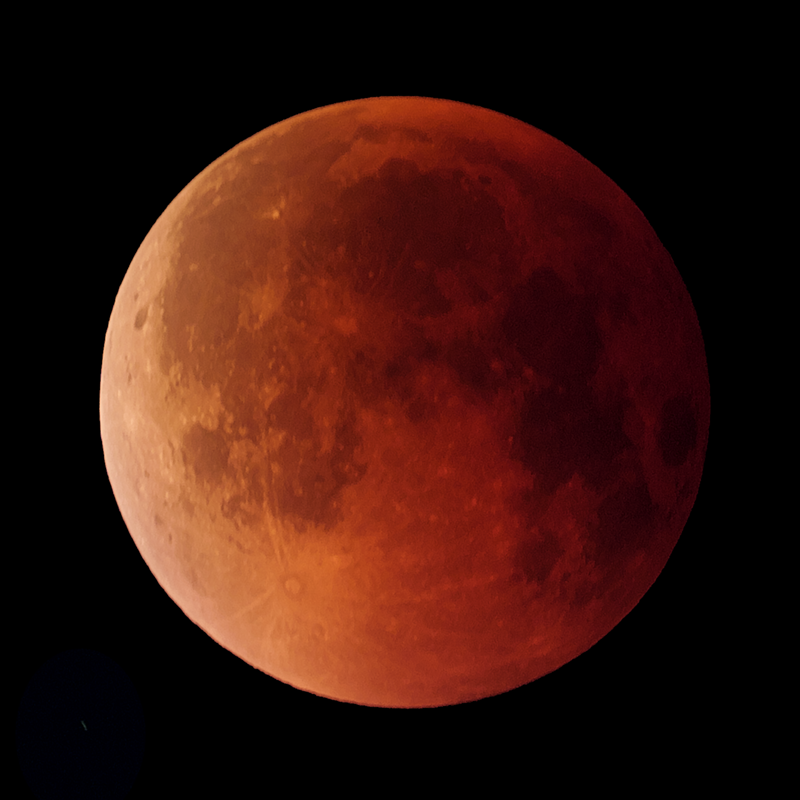
Berlin, Germany, 18:46 UTC

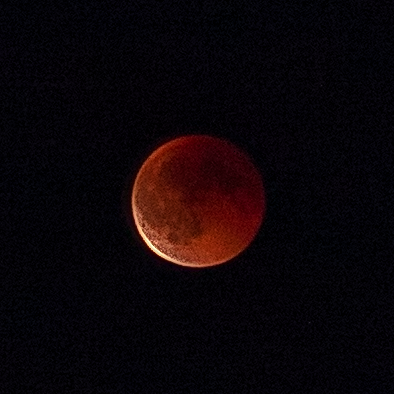
Düdingen, Switzerland, 18:49 UTC

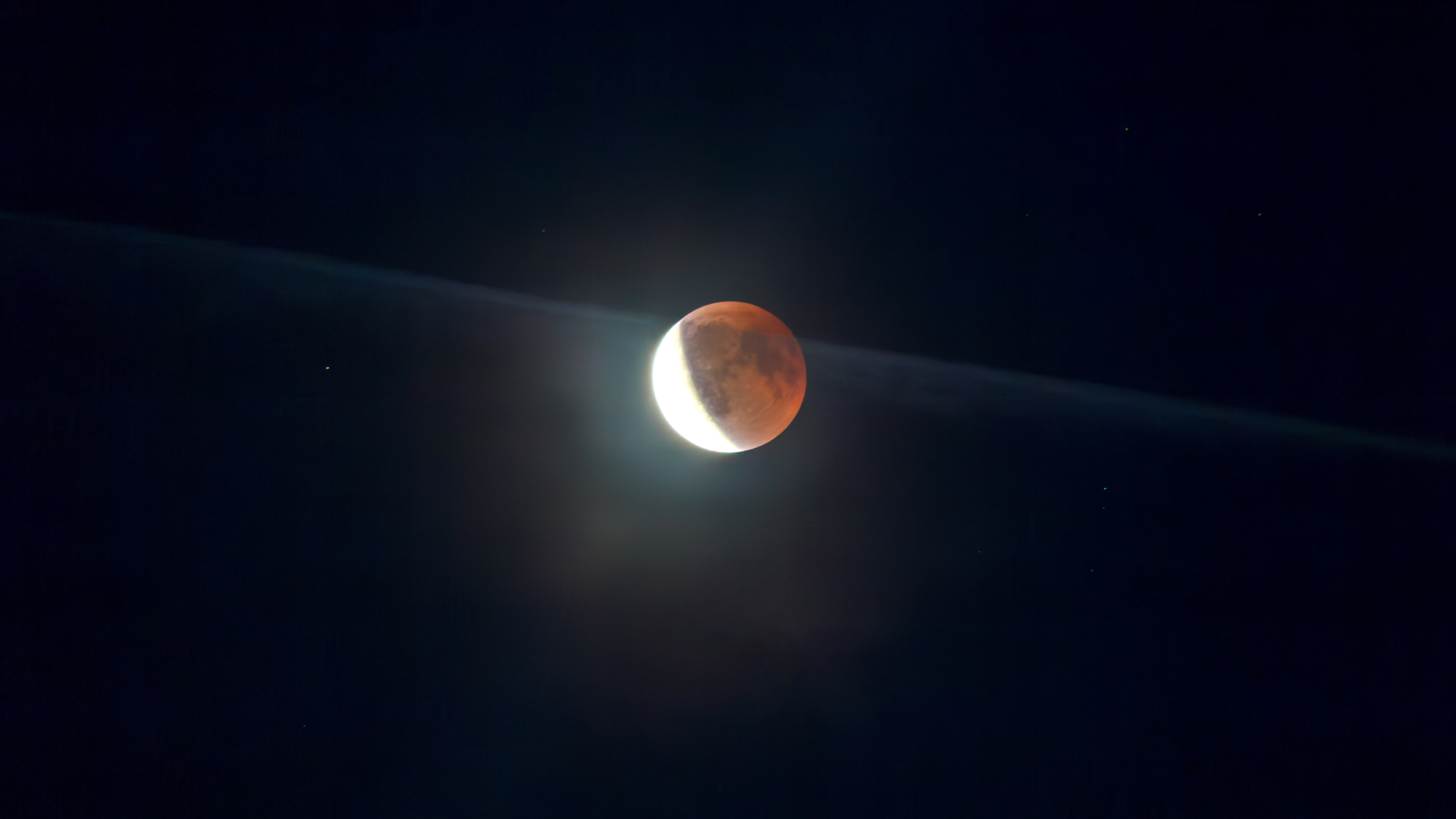
Partial from Brastad, Sweden, 19:14 UTC

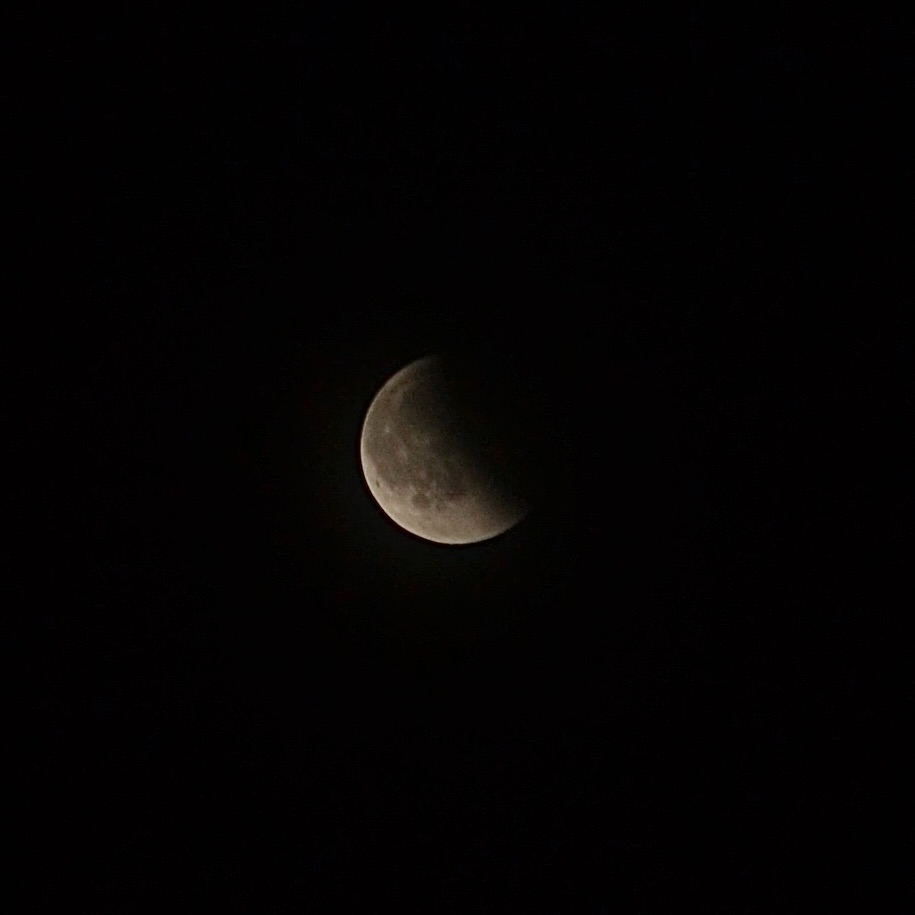
Partial from Casier, Italy, 19:32 UTC

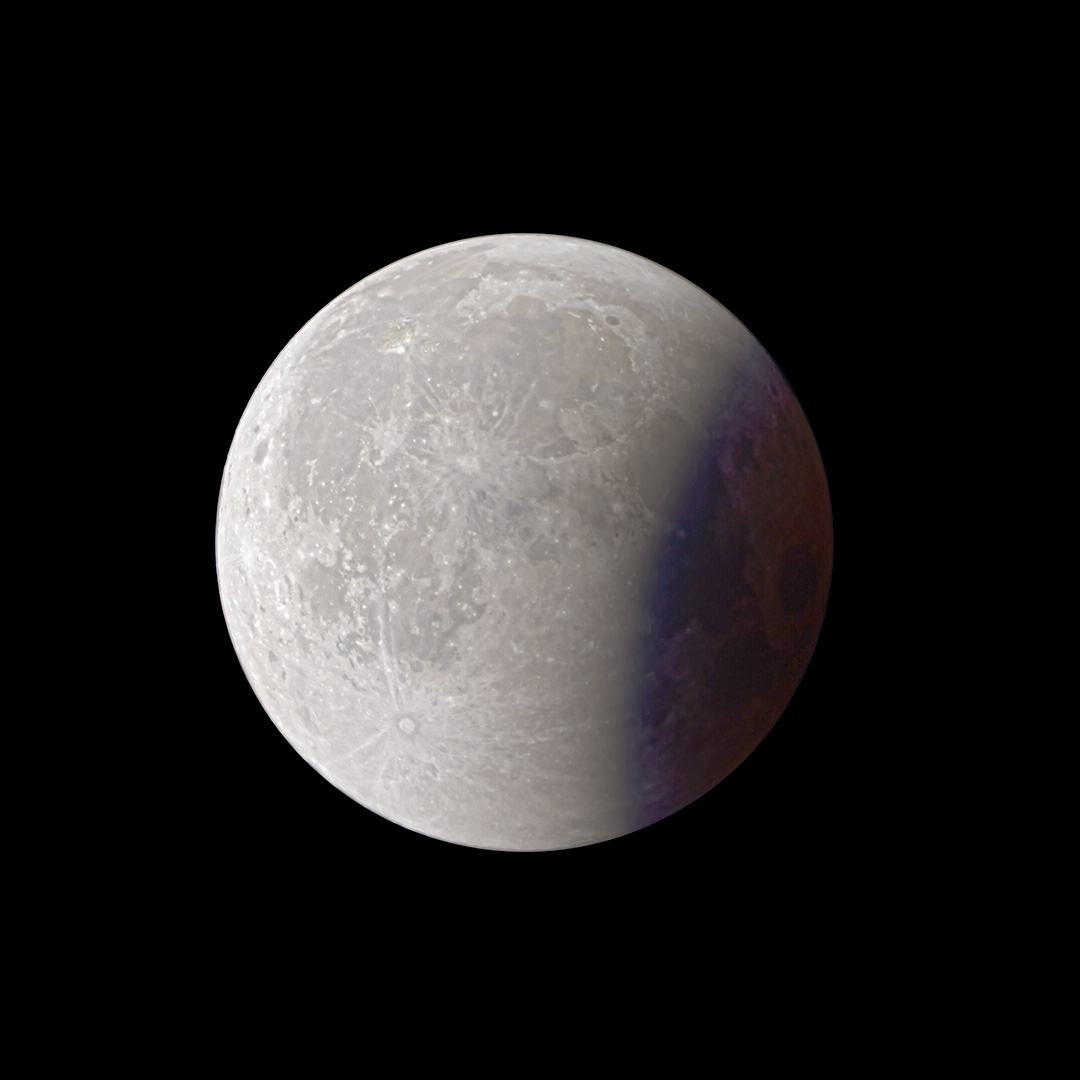
High dynamic range image of the partial eclipse from Berlin, 19:39 UTC

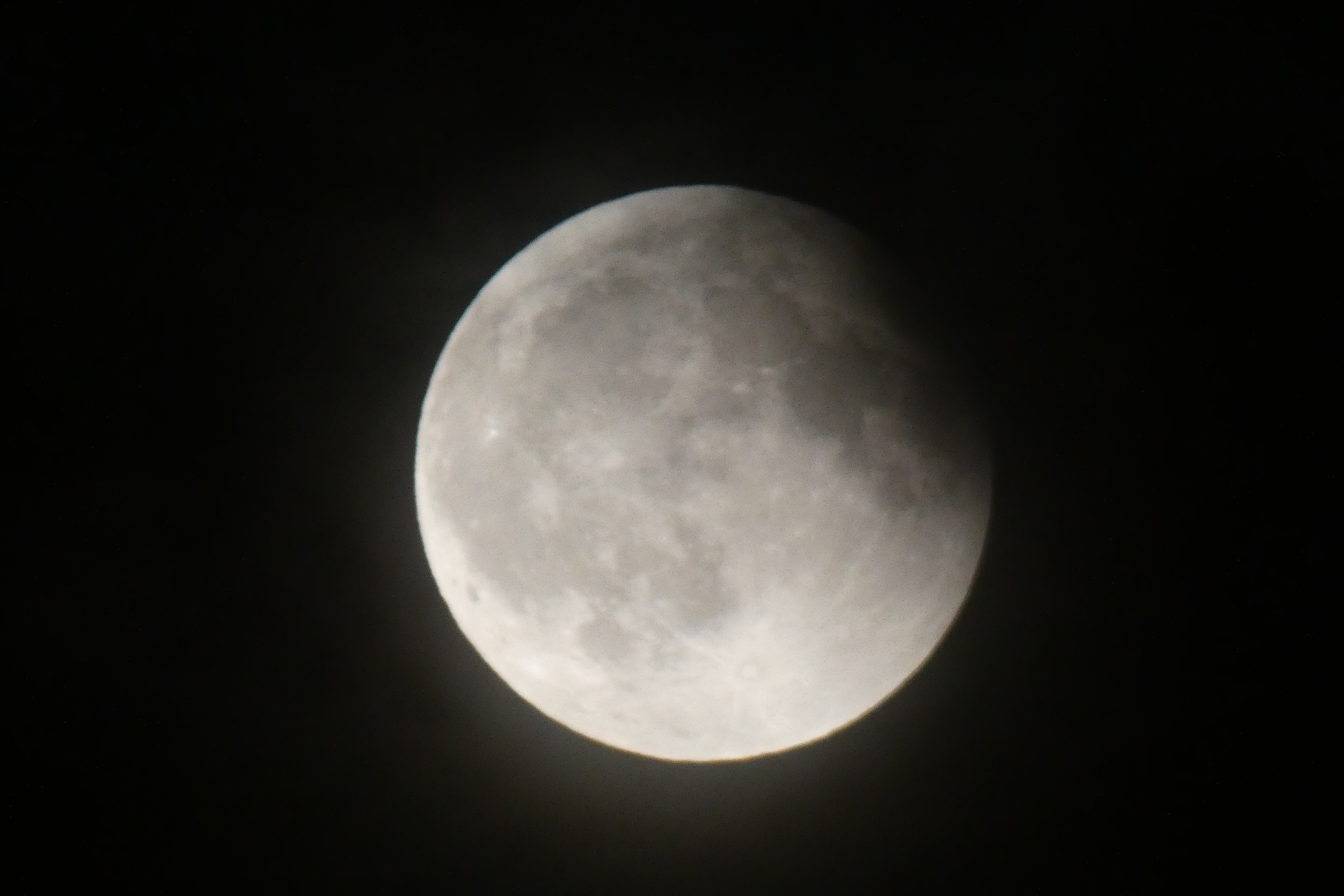
Penumbral phase from Logroño, Spain, 20:06 UTC

== Eclipse details ==
Shown below is a table displaying details about this particular lunar eclipse. It describes various parameters pertaining to this eclipse.

September 7, 2025 Lunar Eclipse Parameters
Parameter	Value
Penumbral Magnitude	2.34591
Umbral Magnitude	1.36379
Gamma	−0.27521
Sun Right Ascension	11h06m09.1s
Sun Declination	+05°45'47.6"
Sun Semi-Diameter	15'52.4"
Sun Equatorial Horizontal Parallax	08.7"
Moon Right Ascension	23h06m40.4s
Moon Declination	-06°00'08.9"
Moon Semi-Diameter	16'09.8"
Moon Equatorial Horizontal Parallax	0°59'19.1"
ΔT	71.9 s

== Eclipse season ==
This eclipse is part of an eclipse season, a period, roughly every six months, when eclipses occur. Only two (or occasionally three) eclipse seasons occur each year, and each season lasts about 35 days and repeats just short of six months (173 days) later; thus two full eclipse seasons always occur each year. Either two or three eclipses happen each eclipse season. In the sequence below, each eclipse is separated by a fortnight.

Eclipse season of September 2025
September 7 Ascending node (full moon)	September 21 Descending node (new moon)
Total lunar eclipse Lunar Saros 128	Partial solar eclipse Solar Saros 154

== Related eclipses ==
=== Eclipses in 2025 ===
- A total lunar eclipse on March 14.
- A partial solar eclipse on March 29.
- A total lunar eclipse on September 7.
- A partial solar eclipse on September 21.

=== Metonic ===
- Preceded by: Lunar eclipse of November 19, 2021
- Followed by: Lunar eclipse of June 26, 2029

=== Tzolkinex ===
- Preceded by: Lunar eclipse of July 27, 2018
- Followed by: Lunar eclipse of October 18, 2032

=== Half-Saros ===
- Preceded by: Solar eclipse of September 1, 2016
- Followed by: Solar eclipse of September 12, 2034

=== Tritos ===
- Preceded by: Lunar eclipse of October 8, 2014
- Followed by: Lunar eclipse of August 7, 2036

=== Lunar Saros 128 ===
- Preceded by: Lunar eclipse of August 28, 2007
- Followed by: Lunar eclipse of September 19, 2043

=== Inex ===
- Preceded by: Lunar eclipse of September 27, 1996
- Followed by: Lunar eclipse of August 18, 2054

=== Triad ===
- Preceded by: Lunar eclipse of November 7, 1938
- Followed by: Lunar eclipse of July 9, 2112

=== Lunar eclipses of 2024–2027 ===
This eclipse is a member of a semester series. An eclipse in a semester series of lunar eclipses repeats approximately every 177 days and 4 hours (a semester) at alternating nodes of the Moon's orbit.

The penumbral lunar eclipse on July 18, 2027 occurs in the next lunar year eclipse set.

Lunar eclipse series sets from 2024 to 2027
Descending node				Ascending node			
Saros	Date Viewing	Type Chart	Gamma	Saros	Date Viewing	Type Chart	Gamma
113	2024 Mar 25	Penumbral	1.0610	118	2024 Sep 18	Partial	−0.9792
123	2025 Mar 14	Total	0.3485	128	2025 Sep 07	Total	−0.2752
133	2026 Mar 03	Total	−0.3765	138	2026 Aug 28	Partial	0.4964
143	2027 Feb 20	Penumbral	−1.0480	148	2027 Aug 17	Penumbral	1.2797

=== Metonic series ===
The Metonic cycle repeats nearly exactly every 19 years and represents a Saros cycle plus one lunar year. Because it occurs on the same calendar date, the Earth's shadow will in nearly the same location relative to the background stars.

1. 2006 Mar 14.99 - penumbral (113); 2. 2025 Mar 14.29 - total (123); 3. 2044 Mar 13.82 - total (133); 4. 2063 Mar 14.67- partial (143)	1. 2006 Sep 07.79 - partial (118); 2. 2025 Sep 07.76 - total (128); 3. 2044 Sep 07.47 - partial (138); 4. 2063 Sep 07.86 - penumbral (148)

=== Saros 128 ===
This eclipse is a part of Saros series 128, repeating every 18 years, 11 days, and containing 71 events. The series started with a penumbral lunar eclipse on June 18, 1304. It contains partial eclipses from September 2, 1430 through May 11, 1827; total eclipses from May 21, 1845 through October 21, 2097; and a second set of partial eclipses from November 2, 2115 through May 17, 2440. The series ends at member 71 as a penumbral eclipse on August 2, 2566.

The longest duration of totality was produced by member 37 at 100 minutes, 43 seconds on July 26, 1953. All eclipses in this series occur at the Moon’s ascending node of orbit.

Greatest	First			
The greatest eclipse of the series occurred on 1953 Jul 26, lasting 100 minutes, 43 seconds.	Penumbral	Partial	Total	Central
The greatest eclipse of the series occurred on 1953 Jul 26, lasting 100 minutes, 43 seconds.	1304 Jun 18	1430 Sep 02	1845 May 21	1899 Jun 23
The greatest eclipse of the series occurred on 1953 Jul 26, lasting 100 minutes, 43 seconds.	Last			
The greatest eclipse of the series occurred on 1953 Jul 26, lasting 100 minutes, 43 seconds.	Central	Total	Partial	Penumbral
The greatest eclipse of the series occurred on 1953 Jul 26, lasting 100 minutes, 43 seconds.	2007 Aug 28	2097 Oct 21	2440 May 17	2566 Aug 02

Eclipses are tabulated in three columns; every third eclipse in the same column is one exeligmos apart, so they all cast shadows over approximately the same parts of the Earth.

Series members 29–50 occur between 1801 and 2200:
29	30	31
1809 Apr 30	1827 May 11	1845 May 21
32	33	34
1863 Jun 01	1881 Jun 12	1899 Jun 23
35	36	37
1917 Jul 04	1935 Jul 16	1953 Jul 26
38	39	40
1971 Aug 06	1989 Aug 17	2007 Aug 28
41	42	43
2025 Sep 07	2043 Sep 19	2061 Sep 29
44	45	46
2079 Oct 10	2097 Oct 21	2115 Nov 02
47	48	49
2133 Nov 12	2151 Nov 24	2169 Dec 04
50
2187 Dec 15

=== Tritos series ===
This eclipse is a part of a tritos cycle, repeating at alternating nodes every 135 synodic months (≈ 3986.63 days, or 11 years minus 1 month). Their appearance and longitude are irregular due to a lack of synchronization with the anomalistic month (period of perigee), but groupings of 3 tritos cycles (≈ 33 years minus 3 months) come close (≈ 434.044 anomalistic months), so eclipses are similar in these groupings.

Series members between 1801 and 2200
1807 May 21 (Saros 108)	1818 Apr 21 (Saros 109)	1829 Mar 20 (Saros 110)	1840 Feb 17 (Saros 111)	1851 Jan 17 (Saros 112)
1861 Dec 17 (Saros 113)	1872 Nov 15 (Saros 114)	1883 Oct 16 (Saros 115)	1894 Sep 15 (Saros 116)	1905 Aug 15 (Saros 117)
1916 Jul 15 (Saros 118)	1927 Jun 15 (Saros 119)	1938 May 14 (Saros 120)	1949 Apr 13 (Saros 121)	1960 Mar 13 (Saros 122)
1971 Feb 10 (Saros 123)	1982 Jan 09 (Saros 124)	1992 Dec 09 (Saros 125)	2003 Nov 09 (Saros 126)	2014 Oct 08 (Saros 127)
2025 Sep 07 (Saros 128)	2036 Aug 07 (Saros 129)	2047 Jul 07 (Saros 130)	2058 Jun 06 (Saros 131)	2069 May 06 (Saros 132)
2080 Apr 04 (Saros 133)	2091 Mar 05 (Saros 134)	2102 Feb 03 (Saros 135)	2113 Jan 02 (Saros 136)	2123 Dec 03 (Saros 137)
2134 Nov 02 (Saros 138)	2145 Sep 30 (Saros 139)	2156 Aug 30 (Saros 140)	2167 Aug 01 (Saros 141)	2178 Jun 30 (Saros 142)
2189 May 29 (Saros 143)	2200 Apr 30 (Saros 144)			

=== Inex series ===
This eclipse is a part of the long period inex cycle, repeating at alternating nodes, every 358 synodic months (≈ 10,571.95 days, or 29 years minus 20 days). Their appearance and longitude are irregular due to a lack of synchronization with the anomalistic month (period of perigee). However, groupings of 3 inex cycles (≈ 87 years minus 2 months) comes close (≈ 1,151.02 anomalistic months), so eclipses are similar in these groupings.

Series members between 1801 and 2200
1823 Jan 26 (Saros 121)	1852 Jan 07 (Saros 122)	1880 Dec 16 (Saros 123)
1909 Nov 27 (Saros 124)	1938 Nov 07 (Saros 125)	1967 Oct 18 (Saros 126)
1996 Sep 27 (Saros 127)	2025 Sep 07 (Saros 128)	2054 Aug 18 (Saros 129)
2083 Jul 29 (Saros 130)	2112 Jul 09 (Saros 131)	2141 Jun 19 (Saros 132)
2170 May 30 (Saros 133)	2199 May 10 (Saros 134)	

=== Half-Saros cycle ===
A lunar eclipse will be preceded and followed by solar eclipses by 9 years and 5.5 days (a half saros). This lunar eclipse is related to two annular solar eclipses of Solar Saros 135.

September 1, 2016	September 12, 2034

== See also ==
- List of lunar eclipses
- List of 21st-century lunar eclipses
- Lunar eclipse
- December 2028 lunar eclipse
- October 2032 lunar eclipse
- April 2033 lunar eclipse
