= 1989 lunar eclipse =

Two total lunar eclipses occurred in 1989:

- 20 February 1989 lunar eclipse
- 17 August 1989 lunar eclipse

== See also ==
- List of 20th-century lunar eclipses
- Lists of lunar eclipses
