= January 1935 lunar eclipse =

Total lunar eclipse January 19, 1935

- Total eclipse
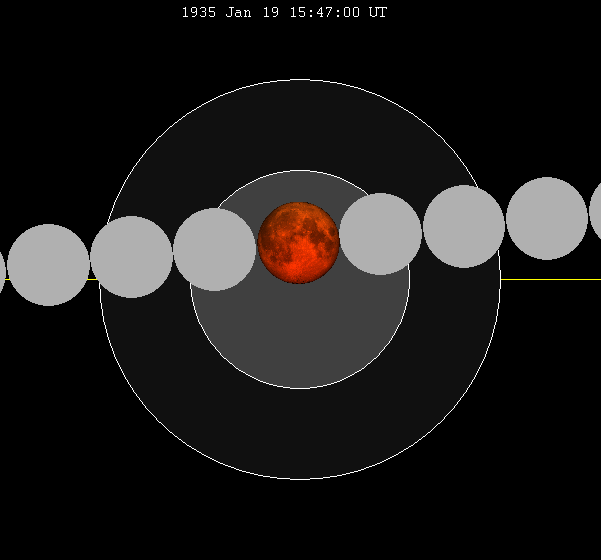
- The Moon's hourly motion shown right to left
- Date: January 19, 1935
- Gamma: 0.2498
- Magnitude: 1.3500
- Saros cycle: 123 (48 of 73)
- Totality: 86 minutes, 16 seconds
- Partiality: 226 minutes, 39 seconds
- Penumbral: 372 minutes, 8 seconds
Contacts (UTC)
- P1: 12:41:08
- U1: 13:53:51
- U2: 15:04:03
- Greatest: 15:47:11
- U3: 16:30:19
- U4: 17:40:30
- P4: 18:53:16

A total lunar eclipse occurred at the Moon’s descending node of orbit on Saturday, January 19, 1935, with an umbral magnitude of 1.3500. It was a central lunar eclipse, in which part of the Moon passed through the center of the Earth's shadow. A lunar eclipse occurs when the Moon moves into the Earth's shadow, causing the Moon to be darkened. A total lunar eclipse occurs when the Moon's near side entirely passes into the Earth's umbral shadow. Unlike a solar eclipse, which can only be viewed from a relatively small area of the world, a lunar eclipse may be viewed from anywhere on the night side of Earth. A total lunar eclipse can last up to nearly two hours, while a total solar eclipse lasts only a few minutes at any given place, because the Moon's shadow is smaller. Occurring about 2.3 days before apogee (on January 21, 1935, at 22:10 UTC), the Moon's apparent diameter was smaller.

== Visibility ==
The eclipse was completely visible over much of Asia and Australia, seen rising over Africa, Europe, and the Middle East and setting over North America and the eastern Pacific Ocean.

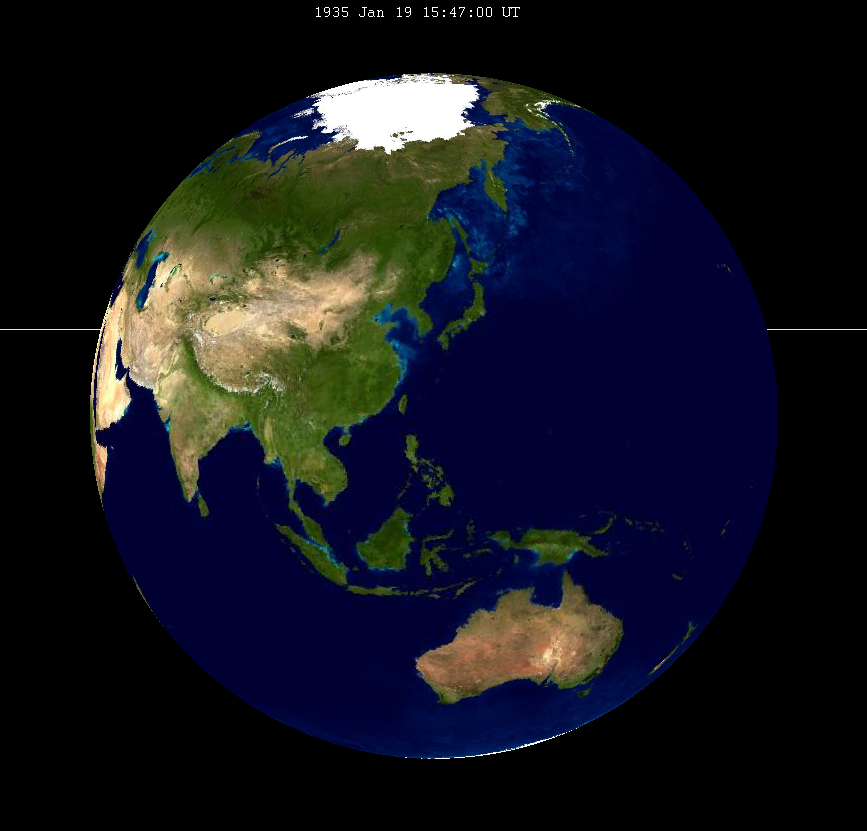
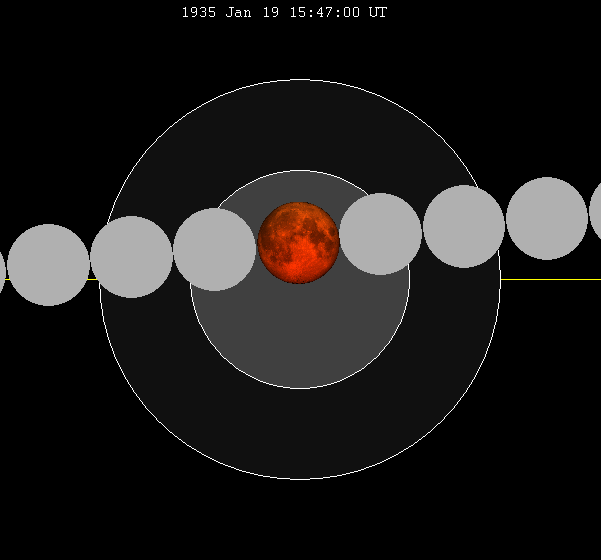

== Eclipse details ==
Shown below is a table displaying details about this particular lunar eclipse. It describes various parameters pertaining to this eclipse.

January 19, 1935 Lunar Eclipse Parameters
Parameter	Value
Penumbral Magnitude	2.45023
Umbral Magnitude	1.34995
Gamma	0.24979
Sun Right Ascension	20h03m07.8s
Sun Declination	-20°26'15.8"
Sun Semi-Diameter	16'15.3"
Sun Equatorial Horizontal Parallax	08.9"
Moon Right Ascension	08h03m25.2s
Moon Declination	+20°39'10.5"
Moon Semi-Diameter	14'46.4"
Moon Equatorial Horizontal Parallax	0°54'13.1"
ΔT	23.8 s

== Eclipse season ==
This eclipse is part of an eclipse season, a period, roughly every six months, when eclipses occur. Only two (or occasionally three) eclipse seasons occur each year, and each season lasts about 35 days and repeats just short of six months (173 days) later; thus two full eclipse seasons always occur each year. Either two or three eclipses happen each eclipse season. In the sequence below, each eclipse is separated by a fortnight. The first and last eclipse in this sequence is separated by one synodic month.

Eclipse season of January–February 1935
January 5 Ascending node (new moon)	January 19 Descending node (full moon)	February 3 Ascending node (new moon)
Partial solar eclipse Solar Saros 111	Total lunar eclipse Lunar Saros 123	Partial solar eclipse Solar Saros 149

== Related eclipses ==
=== Eclipses in 1935 ===
- A partial solar eclipse on January 5.
- A total lunar eclipse on January 19.
- A partial solar eclipse on February 3.
- A partial solar eclipse on June 30.
- A total lunar eclipse on July 16.
- A partial solar eclipse on July 30.
- An annular solar eclipse on December 25.

=== Metonic ===
- Preceded by: Lunar eclipse of April 2, 1931
- Followed by: Lunar eclipse of November 7, 1938

=== Tzolkinex ===
- Preceded by: Lunar eclipse of December 8, 1927
- Followed by: Lunar eclipse of March 3, 1942

=== Half-Saros ===
- Preceded by: Solar eclipse of January 14, 1926
- Followed by: Solar eclipse of January 25, 1944

=== Tritos ===
- Preceded by: Lunar eclipse of February 20, 1924
- Followed by: Lunar eclipse of December 19, 1945

=== Lunar Saros 123 ===
- Preceded by: Lunar eclipse of January 8, 1917
- Followed by: Lunar eclipse of January 29, 1953

=== Inex ===
- Preceded by: Lunar eclipse of February 9, 1906
- Followed by: Lunar eclipse of December 30, 1963

=== Triad ===
- Preceded by: Lunar eclipse of March 19, 1848
- Followed by: Lunar eclipse of November 19, 2021

=== Lunar eclipses of 1933–1936 ===
This eclipse is a member of a semester series. An eclipse in a semester series of lunar eclipses repeats approximately every 177 days and 4 hours (a semester) at alternating nodes of the Moon's orbit.

The penumbral lunar eclipses on March 12, 1933 and September 4, 1933 occur in the previous lunar year eclipse set.

Lunar eclipse series sets from 1933 to 1936
Descending node				Ascending node			
Saros	Date Viewing	Type Chart	Gamma	Saros	Date Viewing	Type Chart	Gamma
103	1933 Feb 10	Penumbral	1.5600	108	1933 Aug 05	Penumbral	−1.4216
113	1934 Jan 30	Partial	0.9258	118	1934 Jul 26	Partial	−0.6681
123	1935 Jan 19	Total	0.2498	128	1935 Jul 16	Total	0.0672
133	1936 Jan 08	Total	−0.4429	138	1936 Jul 04	Partial	0.8642
143	1936 Dec 28	Penumbral	−1.0971				

=== Saros 123 ===
This eclipse is a part of Saros series 123, repeating every 18 years, 11 days, and containing 72 events. The series started with a penumbral lunar eclipse on August 16, 1087. It contains partial eclipses from May 2, 1520 through July 6, 1610; total eclipses from July 16, 1628 through April 4, 2061; and a second set of partial eclipses from April 16, 2079 through July 2, 2205. The series ends at member 72 as a penumbral eclipse on October 8, 2367.

The longest duration of totality was produced by member 37 at 105 minutes, 58 seconds on September 20, 1736. All eclipses in this series occur at the Moon’s descending node of orbit.

Greatest	First			
The greatest eclipse of the series occurred on 1736 Sep 20, lasting 105 minutes, 58 seconds.	Penumbral	Partial	Total	Central
The greatest eclipse of the series occurred on 1736 Sep 20, lasting 105 minutes, 58 seconds.	1087 Aug 16	1520 May 02	1628 Jul 16	1682 Aug 18
The greatest eclipse of the series occurred on 1736 Sep 20, lasting 105 minutes, 58 seconds.	Last			
The greatest eclipse of the series occurred on 1736 Sep 20, lasting 105 minutes, 58 seconds.	Central	Total	Partial	Penumbral
The greatest eclipse of the series occurred on 1736 Sep 20, lasting 105 minutes, 58 seconds.	1953 Jan 29	2061 Apr 04	2205 Jul 02	2367 Oct 08

Eclipses are tabulated in three columns; every third eclipse in the same column is one exeligmos apart, so they all cast shadows over approximately the same parts of the Earth.

Series members 41–62 occur between 1801 and 2200:
41	42	43
1808 Nov 03	1826 Nov 14	1844 Nov 24
44	45	46
1862 Dec 06	1880 Dec 16	1898 Dec 27
47	48	49
1917 Jan 08	1935 Jan 19	1953 Jan 29
50	51	52
1971 Feb 10	1989 Feb 20	2007 Mar 03
53	54	55
2025 Mar 14	2043 Mar 25	2061 Apr 04
56	57	58
2079 Apr 16	2097 Apr 26	2115 May 08
59	60	61
2133 May 19	2151 May 30	2169 Jun 09
62
2187 Jun 20

=== Tritos series ===
This eclipse is a part of a tritos cycle, repeating at alternating nodes every 135 synodic months (≈ 3986.63 days, or 11 years minus 1 month). Their appearance and longitude are irregular due to a lack of synchronization with the anomalistic month (period of perigee), but groupings of 3 tritos cycles (≈ 33 years minus 3 months) come close (≈ 434.044 anomalistic months), so eclipses are similar in these groupings.

Series members between 1801 and 2200
1804 Jan 26 (Saros 111)	1814 Dec 26 (Saros 112)	1825 Nov 25 (Saros 113)	1836 Oct 24 (Saros 114)	1847 Sep 24 (Saros 115)
1858 Aug 24 (Saros 116)	1869 Jul 23 (Saros 117)	1880 Jun 22 (Saros 118)	1891 May 23 (Saros 119)	1902 Apr 22 (Saros 120)
1913 Mar 22 (Saros 121)	1924 Feb 20 (Saros 122)	1935 Jan 19 (Saros 123)	1945 Dec 19 (Saros 124)	1956 Nov 18 (Saros 125)
1967 Oct 18 (Saros 126)	1978 Sep 16 (Saros 127)	1989 Aug 17 (Saros 128)	2000 Jul 16 (Saros 129)	2011 Jun 15 (Saros 130)
2022 May 16 (Saros 131)	2033 Apr 14 (Saros 132)	2044 Mar 13 (Saros 133)	2055 Feb 11 (Saros 134)	2066 Jan 11 (Saros 135)
2076 Dec 10 (Saros 136)	2087 Nov 10 (Saros 137)	2098 Oct 10 (Saros 138)	2109 Sep 09 (Saros 139)	2120 Aug 09 (Saros 140)
2131 Jul 10 (Saros 141)	2142 Jun 08 (Saros 142)	2153 May 08 (Saros 143)	2164 Apr 07 (Saros 144)	2175 Mar 07 (Saros 145)
2186 Feb 04 (Saros 146)	2197 Jan 04 (Saros 147)			

=== Inex series ===
This eclipse is a part of the long period inex cycle, repeating at alternating nodes, every 358 synodic months (≈ 10,571.95 days, or 29 years minus 20 days). Their appearance and longitude are irregular due to a lack of synchronization with the anomalistic month (period of perigee). However, groupings of 3 inex cycles (≈ 87 years minus 2 months) comes close (≈ 1,151.02 anomalistic months), so eclipses are similar in these groupings.

Series members between 1801 and 2200
1819 Apr 10 (Saros 119)	1848 Mar 19 (Saros 120)	1877 Feb 27 (Saros 121)
1906 Feb 09 (Saros 122)	1935 Jan 19 (Saros 123)	1963 Dec 30 (Saros 124)
1992 Dec 09 (Saros 125)	2021 Nov 19 (Saros 126)	2050 Oct 30 (Saros 127)
2079 Oct 10 (Saros 128)	2108 Sep 20 (Saros 129)	2137 Aug 30 (Saros 130)
2166 Aug 11 (Saros 131)	2195 Jul 22 (Saros 132)	

=== Half-Saros cycle ===
A lunar eclipse will be preceded and followed by solar eclipses by 9 years and 5.5 days (a half saros). This lunar eclipse is related to two total solar eclipses of Solar Saros 130.

January 14, 1926	January 25, 1944

== See also ==
- List of lunar eclipses
- List of 20th-century lunar eclipses
