= 1953 lunar eclipse =

Two total lunar eclipses occurred in 1953:

- 29 January 1953 lunar eclipse
- 26 July 1953 lunar eclipse

== See also ==
- List of 20th-century lunar eclipses
- Lists of lunar eclipses
