= 1971 lunar eclipse =

Two total lunar eclipses occurred in 1971:

- 10 February 1971 lunar eclipse
- 6 August 1971 lunar eclipse

== See also ==
- List of 20th-century lunar eclipses
- Lists of lunar eclipses
