= March 2043 lunar eclipse =

Astronomical event

- Total eclipse
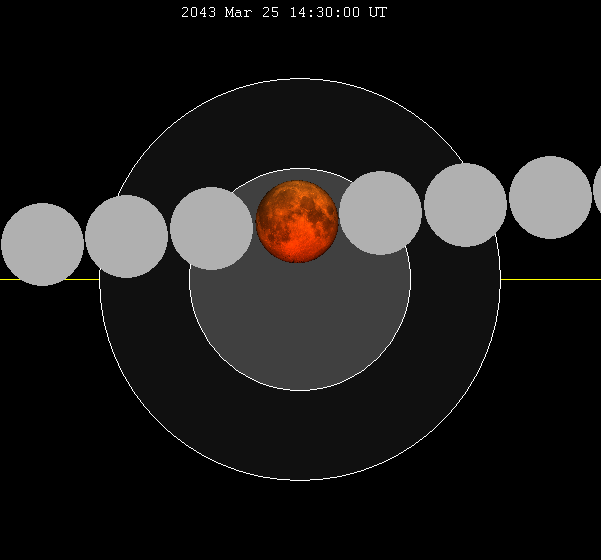
- The Moon's hourly motion shown right to left
- Date: March 25, 2043
- Gamma: 0.3849
- Magnitude: 1.1161
- Saros cycle: 123 (54 of 72)
- Totality: 53 minutes, 24 seconds
- Partiality: 214 minutes, 37 seconds
- Penumbral: 359 minutes, 16 seconds
Contacts (UTC)
- P1: 11:30:59
- U1: 12:43:16
- U2: 14:03:53
- Greatest: 14:30:36
- U3: 14:57:17
- U4: 16:17:53
- P4: 17:30:15

A total lunar eclipse will occur at the Moon’s descending node of orbit on Wednesday, March 25, 2043, with an umbral magnitude of 1.1161. A lunar eclipse occurs when the Moon moves into the Earth's shadow, causing the Moon to be darkened. A total lunar eclipse occurs when the Moon's near side entirely passes into the Earth's umbral shadow. Unlike a solar eclipse, which can only be viewed from a relatively small area of the world, a lunar eclipse may be viewed from anywhere on the night side of Earth. A total lunar eclipse can last up to nearly two hours, while a total solar eclipse lasts only a few minutes at any given place, because the Moon's shadow is smaller. Occurring about 3.4 days before apogee (on March 29, 2043, at 1:30 UTC), the Moon's apparent diameter will be smaller.

This lunar eclipse is the first of a tetrad, with four total lunar eclipses in series, the others being on September 19, 2043; March 13, 2044; and September 7, 2044.

== Visibility ==
The eclipse will be completely visible over east Asia, Australia, and the western Pacific Ocean, seen rising over central and east Africa, eastern Europe, and west, central, and south Asia and setting over much of North America.

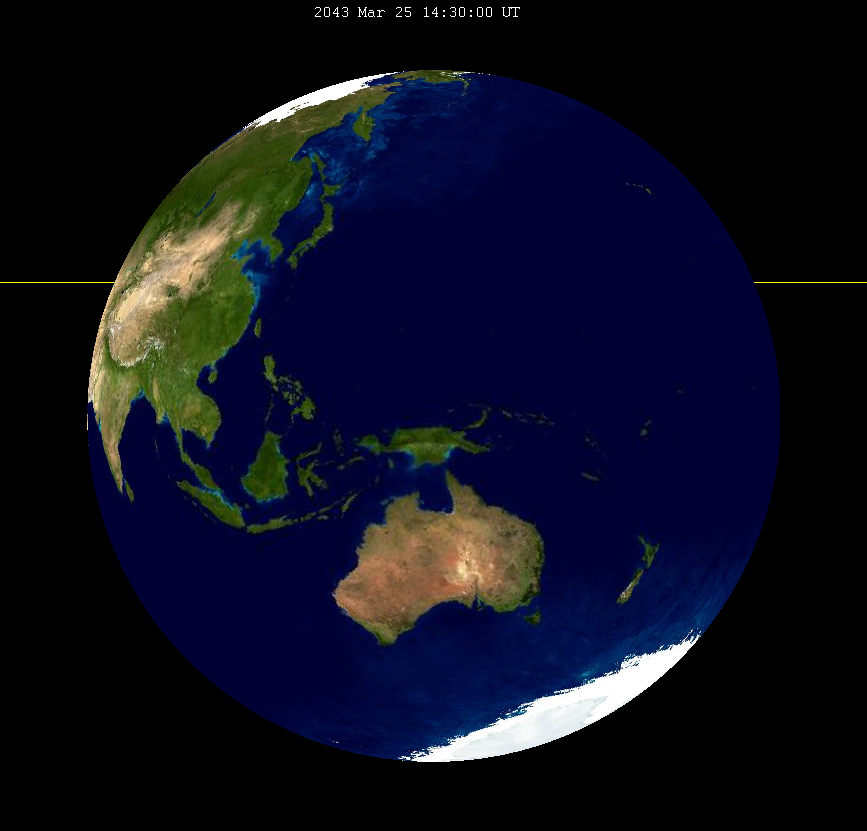
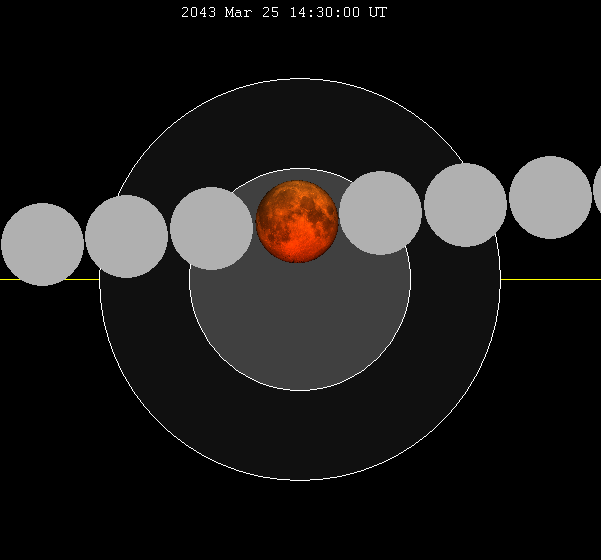

== Eclipse details ==
Shown below is a table displaying details about this particular lunar eclipse. It describes various parameters pertaining to this eclipse.

March 25, 2043 Lunar Eclipse Parameters
Parameter	Value
Penumbral Magnitude	2.19197
Umbral Magnitude	1.11611
Gamma	0.38490
Sun Right Ascension	00h17m45.9s
Sun Declination	+01°55'21.5"
Sun Semi-Diameter	16'02.4"
Sun Equatorial Horizontal Parallax	08.8"
Moon Right Ascension	12h18m26.9s
Moon Declination	-01°36'57.6"
Moon Semi-Diameter	14'54.5"
Moon Equatorial Horizontal Parallax	0°54'42.9"
ΔT	81.0 s

== Eclipse season ==
This eclipse is part of an eclipse season, a period, roughly every six months, when eclipses occur. Only two (or occasionally three) eclipse seasons occur each year, and each season lasts about 35 days and repeats just short of six months (173 days) later; thus two full eclipse seasons always occur each year. Either two or three eclipses happen each eclipse season. In the sequence below, each eclipse is separated by a fortnight.

Eclipse season of March–April 2043
March 25 Descending node (full moon)	April 9 Ascending node (new moon)
Total lunar eclipse Lunar Saros 123	Total solar eclipse Solar Saros 149

== Related eclipses ==
=== Eclipses in 2043 ===
- A total lunar eclipse on March 25.
- A non-central total solar eclipse on April 9.
- A total lunar eclipse on September 19.
- A non-central annular solar eclipse on October 3.

=== Metonic ===
- Preceded by: Lunar eclipse of June 6, 2039
- Followed by: Lunar eclipse of January 12, 2047

=== Tzolkinex ===
- Preceded by: Lunar eclipse of February 11, 2036
- Followed by: Lunar eclipse of May 6, 2050

=== Half-Saros ===
- Preceded by: Solar eclipse of March 20, 2034
- Followed by: Solar eclipse of March 30, 2052

=== Tritos ===
- Preceded by: Lunar eclipse of April 25, 2032
- Followed by: Lunar eclipse of February 22, 2054

=== Lunar Saros 123 ===
- Preceded by: Lunar eclipse of March 14, 2025
- Followed by: Lunar eclipse of April 4, 2061

=== Inex ===
- Preceded by: Lunar eclipse of April 15, 2014
- Followed by: Lunar eclipse of March 4, 2072

=== Triad ===
- Preceded by: Lunar eclipse of May 24, 1956
- Followed by: Lunar eclipse of January 24, 2130

=== Lunar eclipses of 2042–2045 ===
This eclipse is a member of a semester series. An eclipse in a semester series of lunar eclipses repeats approximately every 177 days and 4 hours (a semester) at alternating nodes of the Moon's orbit.

The penumbral lunar eclipse on October 28, 2042 occurs in the previous lunar year eclipse set.

Lunar eclipse series sets from 2042 to 2045
Descending node				Ascending node			
Saros	Date Viewing	Type Chart	Gamma	Saros	Date Viewing	Type Chart	Gamma
113	2042 Apr 05	Penumbral	1.1080	118	2042 Sep 29	Penumbral	−1.0261
123	2043 Mar 25	Total	0.3849	128	2043 Sep 19	Total	−0.3316
133	2044 Mar 13	Total	−0.3496	138	2044 Sep 07	Total	0.4318
143	2045 Mar 03	Penumbral	−1.0274	148	2045 Aug 27	Penumbral	1.2060

=== Saros 123 ===
This eclipse is a part of Saros series 123, repeating every 18 years, 11 days, and containing 72 events. The series started with a penumbral lunar eclipse on August 16, 1087. It contains partial eclipses from May 2, 1520 through July 6, 1610; total eclipses from July 16, 1628 through April 4, 2061; and a second set of partial eclipses from April 16, 2079 through July 2, 2205. The series ends at member 72 as a penumbral eclipse on October 8, 2367.

The longest duration of totality was produced by member 37 at 105 minutes, 58 seconds on September 20, 1736. All eclipses in this series occur at the Moon’s descending node of orbit.

Greatest	First			
The greatest eclipse of the series occurred on 1736 Sep 20, lasting 105 minutes, 58 seconds.	Penumbral	Partial	Total	Central
The greatest eclipse of the series occurred on 1736 Sep 20, lasting 105 minutes, 58 seconds.	1087 Aug 16	1520 May 02	1628 Jul 16	1682 Aug 18
The greatest eclipse of the series occurred on 1736 Sep 20, lasting 105 minutes, 58 seconds.	Last			
The greatest eclipse of the series occurred on 1736 Sep 20, lasting 105 minutes, 58 seconds.	Central	Total	Partial	Penumbral
The greatest eclipse of the series occurred on 1736 Sep 20, lasting 105 minutes, 58 seconds.	1953 Jan 29	2061 Apr 04	2205 Jul 02	2367 Oct 08

Eclipses are tabulated in three columns; every third eclipse in the same column is one exeligmos apart, so they all cast shadows over approximately the same parts of the Earth.

Series members 41–62 occur between 1801 and 2200:
41	42	43
1808 Nov 03	1826 Nov 14	1844 Nov 24
44	45	46
1862 Dec 06	1880 Dec 16	1898 Dec 27
47	48	49
1917 Jan 08	1935 Jan 19	1953 Jan 29
50	51	52
1971 Feb 10	1989 Feb 20	2007 Mar 03
53	54	55
2025 Mar 14	2043 Mar 25	2061 Apr 04
56	57	58
2079 Apr 16	2097 Apr 26	2115 May 08
59	60	61
2133 May 19	2151 May 30	2169 Jun 09
62
2187 Jun 20

=== Tritos series ===
This eclipse is a part of a tritos cycle, repeating at alternating nodes every 135 synodic months (≈ 3986.63 days, or 11 years minus 1 month). Their appearance and longitude are irregular due to a lack of synchronization with the anomalistic month (period of perigee), but groupings of 3 tritos cycles (≈ 33 years minus 3 months) come close (≈ 434.044 anomalistic months), so eclipses are similar in these groupings.

Series members between 1801 and 2200
1803 Feb 06 (Saros 101)	1814 Jan 06 (Saros 102)	1824 Dec 06 (Saros 103)		1846 Oct 04 (Saros 105)
1857 Sep 04 (Saros 106)	1868 Aug 03 (Saros 107)	1879 Jul 03 (Saros 108)	1890 Jun 03 (Saros 109)	1901 May 03 (Saros 110)
1912 Apr 01 (Saros 111)	1923 Mar 03 (Saros 112)	1934 Jan 30 (Saros 113)	1944 Dec 29 (Saros 114)	1955 Nov 29 (Saros 115)
1966 Oct 29 (Saros 116)	1977 Sep 27 (Saros 117)	1988 Aug 27 (Saros 118)	1999 Jul 28 (Saros 119)	2010 Jun 26 (Saros 120)
2021 May 26 (Saros 121)	2032 Apr 25 (Saros 122)	2043 Mar 25 (Saros 123)	2054 Feb 22 (Saros 124)	2065 Jan 22 (Saros 125)
2075 Dec 22 (Saros 126)	2086 Nov 20 (Saros 127)	2097 Oct 21 (Saros 128)	2108 Sep 20 (Saros 129)	2119 Aug 20 (Saros 130)
2130 Jul 21 (Saros 131)	2141 Jun 19 (Saros 132)	2152 May 18 (Saros 133)	2163 Apr 19 (Saros 134)	2174 Mar 18 (Saros 135)
2185 Feb 14 (Saros 136)	2196 Jan 15 (Saros 137)			

=== Inex series ===
This eclipse is a part of the long period inex cycle, repeating at alternating nodes, every 358 synodic months (≈ 10,571.95 days, or 29 years minus 20 days). Their appearance and longitude are irregular due to a lack of synchronization with the anomalistic month (period of perigee). However, groupings of 3 inex cycles (≈ 87 years minus 2 months) comes close (≈ 1,151.02 anomalistic months), so eclipses are similar in these groupings.

Series members between 1801 and 2200
1811 Sep 02 (Saros 115)	1840 Aug 13 (Saros 116)	1869 Jul 23 (Saros 117)
1898 Jul 03 (Saros 118)	1927 Jun 15 (Saros 119)	1956 May 24 (Saros 120)
1985 May 04 (Saros 121)	2014 Apr 15 (Saros 122)	2043 Mar 25 (Saros 123)
2072 Mar 04 (Saros 124)	2101 Feb 14 (Saros 125)	2130 Jan 24 (Saros 126)
2159 Jan 04 (Saros 127)	2187 Dec 15 (Saros 128)	

=== Half-Saros cycle ===
A lunar eclipse will be preceded and followed by solar eclipses by 9 years and 5.5 days (a half saros). This lunar eclipse is related to two total solar eclipses of Solar Saros 130.

March 20, 2034	March 30, 2052

== See also ==
- List of lunar eclipses and List of 21st-century lunar eclipses
