= January 1953 lunar eclipse =

Total lunar eclipse January 29, 1953

- Total eclipse
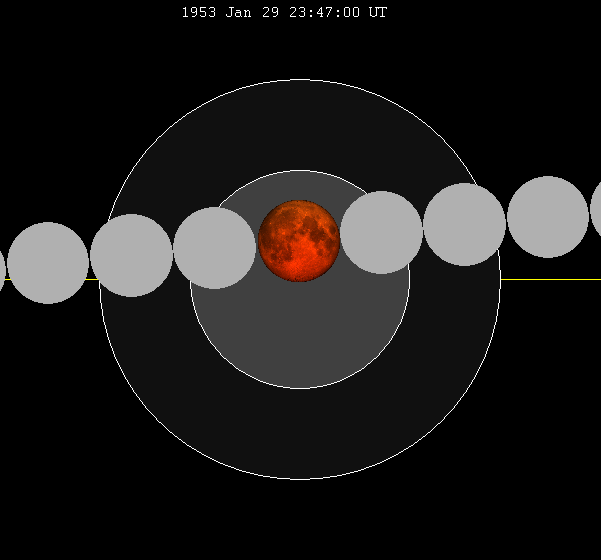
- The Moon's hourly motion shown right to left
- Date: January 29, 1953
- Gamma: 0.2606
- Magnitude: 1.3314
- Saros cycle: 123 (49 of 73)
- Totality: 84 minutes, 31 seconds
- Partiality: 225 minutes, 47 seconds
- Penumbral: 370 minutes, 57 seconds
Contacts (UTC)
- P1: 20:41:51
- U1: 21:54:24
- U2: 23:05:02
- Greatest: 23:47:18
- U3: 0:29:33
- U4: 1:40:11
- P4: 2:52:48

A total lunar eclipse occurred at the Moon’s descending node of orbit on Thursday, January 29, 1953, with an umbral magnitude of 1.3314. It was a central lunar eclipse, in which part of the Moon passed through the center of the Earth's shadow. A lunar eclipse occurs when the Moon moves into the Earth's shadow, causing the Moon to be darkened. A total lunar eclipse occurs when the Moon's near side entirely passes into the Earth's umbral shadow. Unlike a solar eclipse, which can only be viewed from a relatively small area of the world, a lunar eclipse may be viewed from anywhere on the night side of Earth. A total lunar eclipse can last up to nearly two hours, while a total solar eclipse lasts only a few minutes at any given place, because the Moon's shadow is smaller. Occurring about 2.5 days before apogee (on February 1, 1953, at 11:46 UTC), the Moon's apparent diameter was smaller.

== Visibility ==
The eclipse was completely visible over Africa, Europe, and west and central Asia, seen rising over North and South America and setting over western Australia and much of Asia.

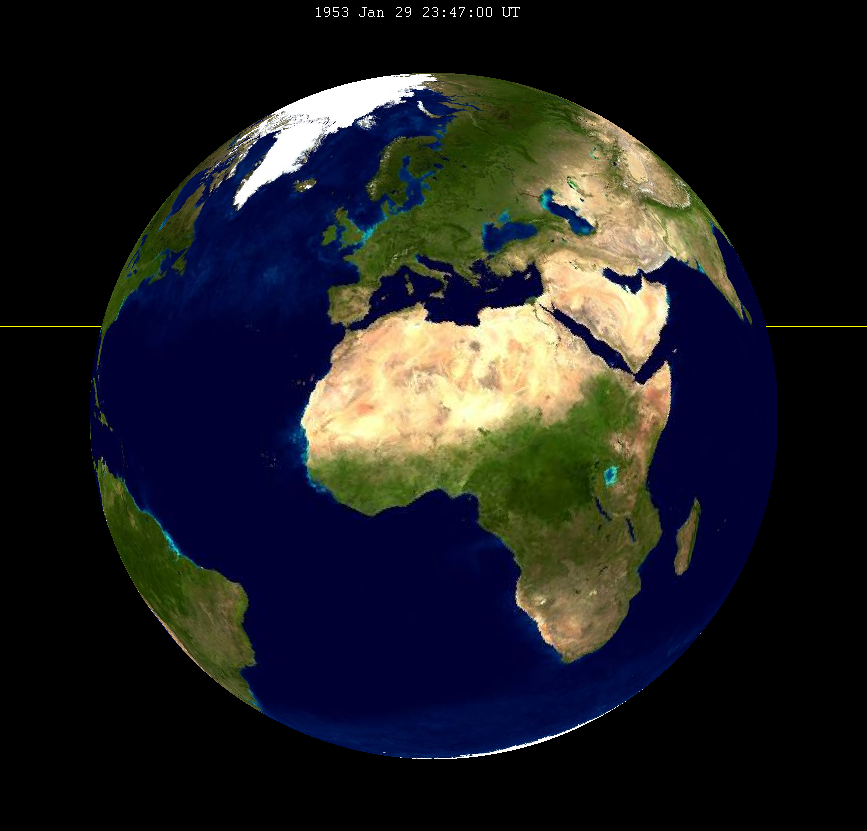
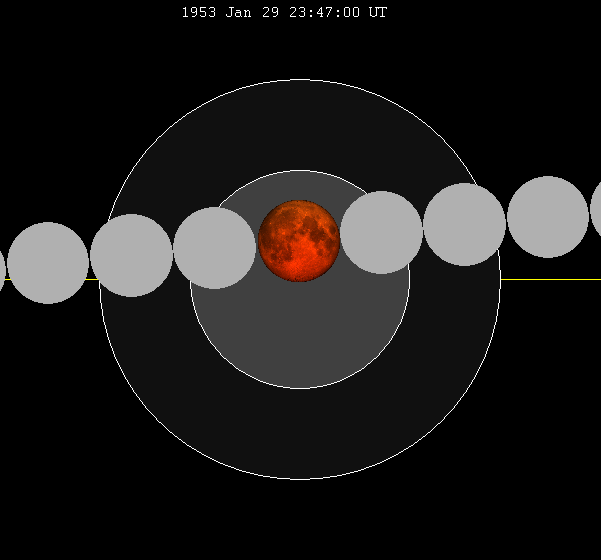

== Eclipse details ==
Shown below is a table displaying details about this particular solar eclipse. It describes various parameters pertaining to this eclipse.

January 29, 1953 Lunar Eclipse Parameters
Parameter	Value
Penumbral Magnitude	2.42906
Umbral Magnitude	1.33137
Gamma	0.26061
Sun Right Ascension	20h48m59.2s
Sun Declination	-17°47'59.2"
Sun Semi-Diameter	16'14.1"
Sun Equatorial Horizontal Parallax	08.9"
Moon Right Ascension	08h49m20.8s
Moon Declination	+18°01'09.9"
Moon Semi-Diameter	14'47.4"
Moon Equatorial Horizontal Parallax	0°54'16.9"
ΔT	30.3 s

== Eclipse season ==
This eclipse is part of an eclipse season, a period, roughly every six months, when eclipses occur. Only two (or occasionally three) eclipse seasons occur each year, and each season lasts about 35 days and repeats just short of six months (173 days) later; thus two full eclipse seasons always occur each year. Either two or three eclipses happen each eclipse season. In the sequence below, each eclipse is separated by a fortnight.

Eclipse season of January–February 1953
January 29 Descending node (full moon)	February 14 Ascending node (new moon)
Total lunar eclipse Lunar Saros 123	Partial solar eclipse Solar Saros 149

== Related eclipses ==
=== Eclipses in 1953 ===
- A total lunar eclipse on January 29.
- A partial solar eclipse on February 14.
- A partial solar eclipse on July 11.
- A total lunar eclipse on July 26.
- A partial solar eclipse on August 9.

=== Metonic ===
- Preceded by: Lunar eclipse of April 13, 1949
- Followed by: Lunar eclipse of November 18, 1956

=== Tzolkinex ===
- Preceded by: Lunar eclipse of December 19, 1945
- Followed by: Lunar eclipse of March 13, 1960

=== Half-Saros ===
- Preceded by: Solar eclipse of January 25, 1944
- Followed by: Solar eclipse of February 5, 1962

=== Tritos ===
- Preceded by: Lunar eclipse of March 3, 1942
- Followed by: Lunar eclipse of December 30, 1963

=== Lunar Saros 123 ===
- Preceded by: Lunar eclipse of January 19, 1935
- Followed by: Lunar eclipse of February 10, 1971

=== Inex ===
- Preceded by: Lunar eclipse of February 20, 1924
- Followed by: Lunar eclipse of January 9, 1982

=== Triad ===
- Preceded by: Lunar eclipse of March 31, 1866
- Followed by: Lunar eclipse of November 30, 2039

=== Lunar eclipses of 1951–1955 ===
This eclipse is a member of a semester series. An eclipse in a semester series of lunar eclipses repeats approximately every 177 days and 4 hours (a semester) at alternating nodes of the Moon's orbit.

The penumbral lunar eclipses on March 23, 1951 and September 15, 1951 occur in the previous lunar year eclipse set, and the lunar eclipses on June 5, 1955 (penumbral) and November 29, 1955 (partial) occur in the next lunar year eclipse set.

Lunar eclipse series sets from 1951 to 1955
Descending node				Ascending node			
Saros	Date Viewing	Type Chart	Gamma	Saros	Date Viewing	Type Chart	Gamma
103	1951 Feb 21	Penumbral	−	108	1951 Aug 17	Penumbral	−1.4828
113	1952 Feb 11	Partial	0.9416	118	1952 Aug 05	Partial	−0.7384
123	1953 Jan 29	Total	0.2606	128	1953 Jul 26	Total	−0.0071
133	1954 Jan 19	Total	−0.4357	138	1954 Jul 16	Partial	0.7877
143	1955 Jan 08	Penumbral	−1.0907				

=== Saros 123 ===
This eclipse is a part of Saros series 123, repeating every 18 years, 11 days, and containing 72 events. The series started with a penumbral lunar eclipse on August 16, 1087. It contains partial eclipses from May 2, 1520 through July 6, 1610; total eclipses from July 16, 1628 through April 4, 2061; and a second set of partial eclipses from April 16, 2079 through July 2, 2205. The series ends at member 72 as a penumbral eclipse on October 8, 2367.

The longest duration of totality was produced by member 37 at 105 minutes, 58 seconds on September 20, 1736. All eclipses in this series occur at the Moon’s descending node of orbit.

Greatest	First			
The greatest eclipse of the series occurred on 1736 Sep 20, lasting 105 minutes, 58 seconds.	Penumbral	Partial	Total	Central
The greatest eclipse of the series occurred on 1736 Sep 20, lasting 105 minutes, 58 seconds.	1087 Aug 16	1520 May 02	1628 Jul 16	1682 Aug 18
The greatest eclipse of the series occurred on 1736 Sep 20, lasting 105 minutes, 58 seconds.	Last			
The greatest eclipse of the series occurred on 1736 Sep 20, lasting 105 minutes, 58 seconds.	Central	Total	Partial	Penumbral
The greatest eclipse of the series occurred on 1736 Sep 20, lasting 105 minutes, 58 seconds.	1953 Jan 29	2061 Apr 04	2205 Jul 02	2367 Oct 08

Eclipses are tabulated in three columns; every third eclipse in the same column is one exeligmos apart, so they all cast shadows over approximately the same parts of the Earth.

Series members 41–62 occur between 1801 and 2200:
41	42	43
1808 Nov 03	1826 Nov 14	1844 Nov 24
44	45	46
1862 Dec 06	1880 Dec 16	1898 Dec 27
47	48	49
1917 Jan 08	1935 Jan 19	1953 Jan 29
50	51	52
1971 Feb 10	1989 Feb 20	2007 Mar 03
53	54	55
2025 Mar 14	2043 Mar 25	2061 Apr 04
56	57	58
2079 Apr 16	2097 Apr 26	2115 May 08
59	60	61
2133 May 19	2151 May 30	2169 Jun 09
62
2187 Jun 20

=== Tritos series ===
This eclipse is a part of a tritos cycle, repeating at alternating nodes every 135 synodic months (≈ 3986.63 days, or 11 years minus 1 month). Their appearance and longitude are irregular due to a lack of synchronization with the anomalistic month (period of perigee), but groupings of 3 tritos cycles (≈ 33 years minus 3 months) come close (≈ 434.044 anomalistic months), so eclipses are similar in these groupings.

Series members between 1801 and 2200
1811 Mar 10 (Saros 110)	1822 Feb 06 (Saros 111)	1833 Jan 06 (Saros 112)	1843 Dec 07 (Saros 113)	1854 Nov 04 (Saros 114)
1865 Oct 04 (Saros 115)	1876 Sep 03 (Saros 116)	1887 Aug 03 (Saros 117)	1898 Jul 03 (Saros 118)	1909 Jun 04 (Saros 119)
1920 May 03 (Saros 120)	1931 Apr 02 (Saros 121)	1942 Mar 03 (Saros 122)	1953 Jan 29 (Saros 123)	1963 Dec 30 (Saros 124)
1974 Nov 29 (Saros 125)	1985 Oct 28 (Saros 126)	1996 Sep 27 (Saros 127)	2007 Aug 28 (Saros 128)	2018 Jul 27 (Saros 129)
2029 Jun 26 (Saros 130)	2040 May 26 (Saros 131)	2051 Apr 26 (Saros 132)	2062 Mar 25 (Saros 133)	2073 Feb 22 (Saros 134)
2084 Jan 22 (Saros 135)	2094 Dec 21 (Saros 136)	2105 Nov 21 (Saros 137)	2116 Oct 21 (Saros 138)	2127 Sep 20 (Saros 139)
2138 Aug 20 (Saros 140)	2149 Jul 20 (Saros 141)	2160 Jun 18 (Saros 142)	2171 May 19 (Saros 143)	2182 Apr 18 (Saros 144)
2193 Mar 17 (Saros 145)

=== Inex series ===
This eclipse is a part of the long period inex cycle, repeating at alternating nodes, every 358 synodic months (≈ 10,571.95 days, or 29 years minus 20 days). Their appearance and longitude are irregular due to a lack of synchronization with the anomalistic month (period of perigee). However, groupings of 3 inex cycles (≈ 87 years minus 2 months) comes close (≈ 1,151.02 anomalistic months), so eclipses are similar in these groupings.

Series members between 1801 and 2200
1808 May 10 (Saros 118)	1837 Apr 20 (Saros 119)	1866 Mar 31 (Saros 120)
1895 Mar 11 (Saros 121)	1924 Feb 20 (Saros 122)	1953 Jan 29 (Saros 123)
1982 Jan 09 (Saros 124)	2010 Dec 21 (Saros 125)	2039 Nov 30 (Saros 126)
2068 Nov 09 (Saros 127)	2097 Oct 21 (Saros 128)	2126 Oct 01 (Saros 129)
2155 Sep 11 (Saros 130)	2184 Aug 21 (Saros 131)	

=== Half-Saros cycle ===
A lunar eclipse will be preceded and followed by solar eclipses by 9 years and 5.5 days (a half saros). This lunar eclipse is related to two total solar eclipses of Solar Saros 130.

January 25, 1944	February 5, 1962

== See also ==
- List of lunar eclipses
- List of 20th-century lunar eclipses
