= May 1985 lunar eclipse =

Astronomical event

- Total eclipse
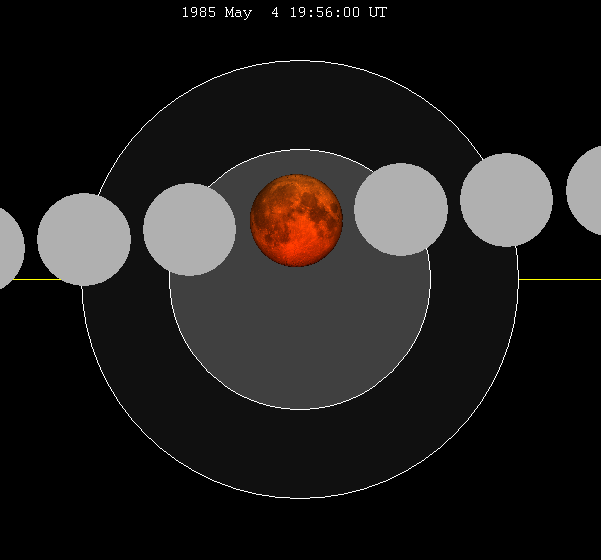
- The Moon's hourly motion shown right to left
- Date: May 4, 1985
- Gamma: 0.3520
- Magnitude: 1.2369
- Saros cycle: 121 (54 of 84)
- Totality: 67 minutes, 41 seconds
- Partiality: 198 minutes, 56 seconds
- Penumbral: 310 minutes, 14 seconds
Contacts (UTC)
- P1: 17:21:17
- U1: 18:16:55
- U2: 19:22:33
- Greatest: 19:56:24
- U3: 20:30:14
- U4: 21:35:51
- P4: 22:31:31

A total lunar eclipse occurred at the Moon's descending node of orbit on Saturday, May 4, 1985, with an umbral magnitude of 1.2369. A lunar eclipse occurs when the Moon moves into the Earth's shadow, causing the Moon to be darkened. A total lunar eclipse occurs when the Moon's near side entirely passes into the Earth's umbral shadow. Unlike a solar eclipse, which can only be viewed from a relatively small area of the world, a lunar eclipse may be viewed from anywhere on the night side of Earth. A total lunar eclipse can last up to nearly two hours, while a total solar eclipse lasts only a few minutes at any given place, because the Moon's shadow is smaller. Occurring only about 13.5 hours after perigee (on May 4, 1985, at 6:20 UTC), the Moon's apparent diameter was larger.

This lunar eclipse was the first of a tetrad, with four total lunar eclipses in series, the others being on October 28, 1985; April 24, 1986; and October 17, 1986.

== Visibility ==
The eclipse was completely visible over central and east Africa, eastern Europe, the western half of Asia, western Australia, and Antarctica, seen rising over much of South America, west Africa, and western Europe and setting over east and northeast Asia and much of Australia.

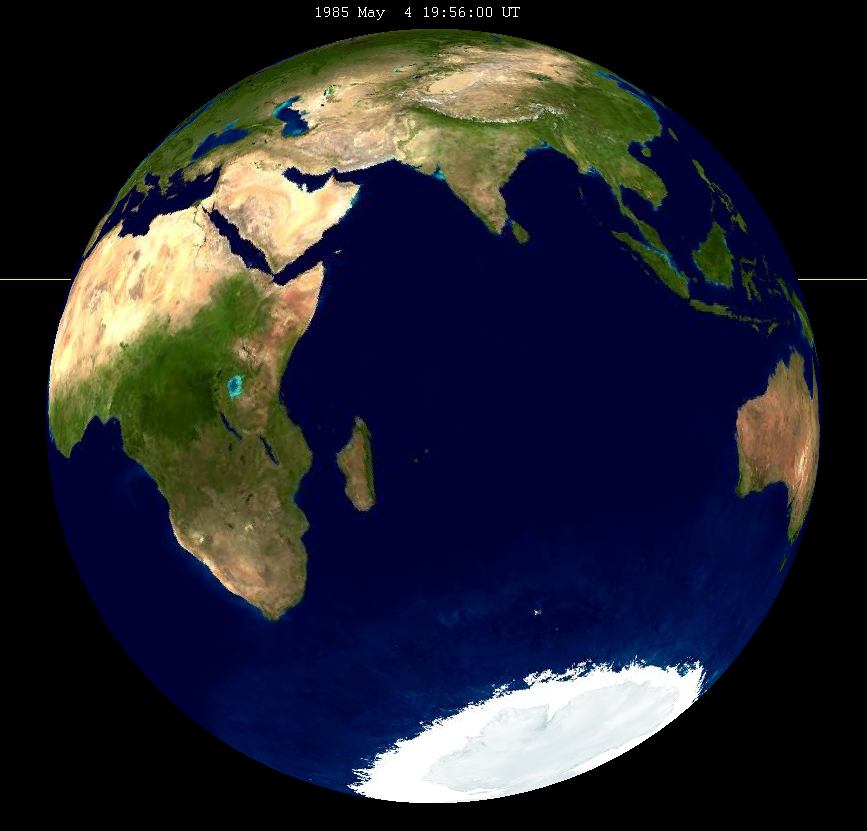
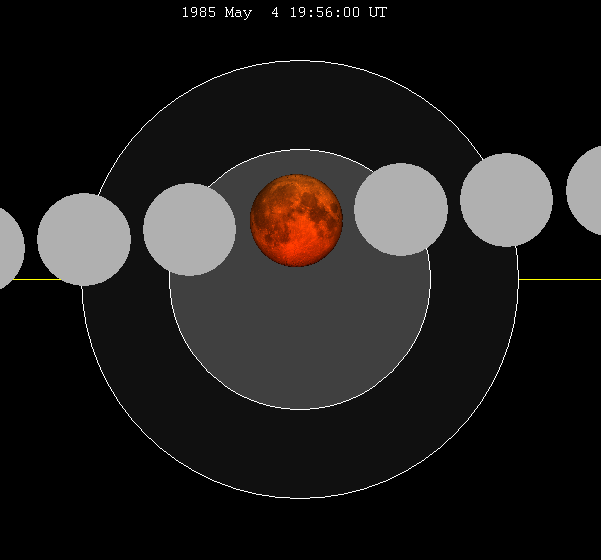

== Eclipse details ==
Shown below is a table displaying details about this particular solar eclipse. It describes various parameters pertaining to this eclipse.

May 4, 1985 Lunar Eclipse Parameters
Parameter	Value
Penumbral Magnitude	2.18702
Umbral Magnitude	1.23687
Gamma	0.35197
Sun Right Ascension	02h47m17.2s
Sun Declination	+16°07'37.7"
Sun Semi-Diameter	15'51.5"
Sun Equatorial Horizontal Parallax	08.7"
Moon Right Ascension	14h47m52.0s
Moon Declination	-15°47'45.9"
Moon Semi-Diameter	16'41.4"
Moon Equatorial Horizontal Parallax	1°01'15.3"
ΔT	54.5 s

== Eclipse season ==
This eclipse is part of an eclipse season, a period, roughly every six months, when eclipses occur. Only two (or occasionally three) eclipse seasons occur each year, and each season lasts about 35 days and repeats just short of six months (173 days) later; thus two full eclipse seasons always occur each year. Either two or three eclipses happen each eclipse season. In the sequence below, each eclipse is separated by a fortnight.

Eclipse season of May 1985
May 4 Descending node (full moon)	May 19 Ascending node (new moon)
Total lunar eclipse Lunar Saros 121	Partial solar eclipse Solar Saros 147

== Related eclipses ==
=== Eclipses in 1985 ===
- A total lunar eclipse on May 4.
- A partial solar eclipse on May 19.
- A total lunar eclipse on October 28.
- A total solar eclipse on November 12.

=== Metonic ===
- Preceded by: Lunar eclipse of July 17, 1981
- Followed by: Lunar eclipse of February 20, 1989

=== Tzolkinex ===
- Preceded by: Lunar eclipse of March 24, 1978
- Followed by: Lunar eclipse of June 15, 1992

=== Half-Saros ===
- Preceded by: Solar eclipse of April 29, 1976
- Followed by: Solar eclipse of May 10, 1994

=== Tritos ===
- Preceded by: Lunar eclipse of June 4, 1974
- Followed by: Lunar eclipse of April 4, 1996

=== Lunar Saros 121 ===
- Preceded by: Lunar eclipse of April 24, 1967
- Followed by: Lunar eclipse of May 16, 2003

=== Inex ===
- Preceded by: Lunar eclipse of May 24, 1956
- Followed by: Lunar eclipse of April 15, 2014

=== Triad ===
- Preceded by: Lunar eclipse of July 3, 1898
- Followed by: Lunar eclipse of March 4, 2072

=== Lunar eclipses of 1984–1987 ===
This eclipse is a member of a semester series. An eclipse in a semester series of lunar eclipses repeats approximately every 177 days and 4 hours (a semester) at alternating nodes of the Moon's orbit.

The penumbral lunar eclipse on June 13, 1984 occurs in the previous lunar year eclipse set.

Lunar eclipse series sets from 1984 to 1987
Descending node				Ascending node			
Saros	Date Viewing	Type Chart	Gamma	Saros	Date Viewing	Type Chart	Gamma
111	1984 May 15	Penumbral	1.1131	116	1984 Nov 08	Penumbral	−1.0900
121	1985 May 04	Total	0.3520	126	1985 Oct 28	Total	−0.4022
131	1986 Apr 24	Total	−0.3683	136	1986 Oct 17	Total	0.3189
141	1987 Apr 14	Penumbral	−1.1364	146	1987 Oct 07	Penumbral	1.0189

=== Metonic series ===
The metonic cycle repeats nearly exactly every 19 years and represents a Saros cycle plus one lunar year. Because it occurs on the same calendar date, the Earth's shadow will in nearly the same location relative to the background stars.

Metonic events: May 4 and October 28
Descending node	Ascending node
1. 1966 May 4 - Penumbral (111); 2. 1985 May 4 - Total (121); 3. 2004 May 4 - Total (131); 4. 2023 May 5 - Penumbral (141)	1. 1966 Oct 29 - Penumbral (116); 2. 1985 Oct 28 - Total (126); 3. 2004 Oct 28 - Total (136); 4. 2023 Oct 28 - Partial (146); 5. 2042 Oct 28 - Penumbral (156)

=== Saros 121 ===
This eclipse is a part of Saros series 121, repeating every 18 years, 11 days, and containing 82 events. The series started with a penumbral lunar eclipse on October 6, 1047. It contains partial eclipses from May 10, 1408 through July 3, 1498; total eclipses from July 13, 1516 through May 26, 2021; and a second set of partial eclipses from June 6, 2039 through August 11, 2147. The series ends at member 82 as a penumbral eclipse on March 18, 2508.

The longest duration of totality was produced by member 43 at 100 minutes, 29 seconds on October 18, 1660. All eclipses in this series occur at the Moon’s descending node of orbit.

Greatest	First			
The greatest eclipse of the series occurred on 1660 Oct 18, lasting 100 minutes, 29 seconds.	Penumbral	Partial	Total	Central
The greatest eclipse of the series occurred on 1660 Oct 18, lasting 100 minutes, 29 seconds.	1047 Oct 06	1408 May 10	1516 Jul 13	1570 Aug 15
The greatest eclipse of the series occurred on 1660 Oct 18, lasting 100 minutes, 29 seconds.	Last			
The greatest eclipse of the series occurred on 1660 Oct 18, lasting 100 minutes, 29 seconds.	Central	Total	Partial	Penumbral
The greatest eclipse of the series occurred on 1660 Oct 18, lasting 100 minutes, 29 seconds.	1949 Apr 13	2021 May 26	2147 Aug 11	2508 Mar 18

Eclipses are tabulated in three columns; every third eclipse in the same column is one exeligmos apart, so they all cast shadows over approximately the same parts of the Earth.

Series members 43–64 occur between 1801 and 2200:
43	44	45
1805 Jan 15	1823 Jan 26	1841 Feb 06
46	47	48
1859 Feb 17	1877 Feb 27	1895 Mar 11
49	50	51
1913 Mar 22	1931 Apr 02	1949 Apr 13
52	53	54
1967 Apr 24	1985 May 04	2003 May 16
55	56	57
2021 May 26	2039 Jun 06	2057 Jun 17
58	59	60
2075 Jun 28	2093 Jul 08	2111 Jul 21
61	62	63
2129 Jul 31	2147 Aug 11	2165 Aug 21
64
2183 Sep 02

=== Tritos series ===
This eclipse is a part of a tritos cycle, repeating at alternating nodes every 135 synodic months (≈ 3986.63 days, or 11 years minus 1 month). Their appearance and longitude are irregular due to a lack of synchronization with the anomalistic month (period of perigee), but groupings of 3 tritos cycles (≈ 33 years minus 3 months) come close (≈ 434.044 anomalistic months), so eclipses are similar in these groupings.

Series members between 1801 and 2200
1810 Sep 13 (Saros 105)	1821 Aug 13 (Saros 106)	1832 Jul 12 (Saros 107)	1843 Jun 12 (Saros 108)	1854 May 12 (Saros 109)
1865 Apr 11 (Saros 110)	1876 Mar 10 (Saros 111)	1887 Feb 08 (Saros 112)	1898 Jan 08 (Saros 113)	1908 Dec 07 (Saros 114)
1919 Nov 07 (Saros 115)	1930 Oct 07 (Saros 116)	1941 Sep 05 (Saros 117)	1952 Aug 05 (Saros 118)	1963 Jul 06 (Saros 119)
1974 Jun 04 (Saros 120)	1985 May 04 (Saros 121)	1996 Apr 04 (Saros 122)	2007 Mar 03 (Saros 123)	2018 Jan 31 (Saros 124)
2028 Dec 31 (Saros 125)	2039 Nov 30 (Saros 126)	2050 Oct 30 (Saros 127)	2061 Sep 29 (Saros 128)	2072 Aug 28 (Saros 129)
2083 Jul 29 (Saros 130)	2094 Jun 28 (Saros 131)	2105 May 28 (Saros 132)	2116 Apr 27 (Saros 133)	2127 Mar 28 (Saros 134)
2138 Feb 24 (Saros 135)	2149 Jan 23 (Saros 136)	2159 Dec 24 (Saros 137)	2170 Nov 23 (Saros 138)	2181 Oct 22 (Saros 139)
2192 Sep 21 (Saros 140)

=== Inex series ===
This eclipse is a part of the long period inex cycle, repeating at alternating nodes, every 358 synodic months (≈ 10,571.95 days, or 29 years minus 20 days). Their appearance and longitude are irregular due to a lack of synchronization with the anomalistic month (period of perigee). However, groupings of 3 inex cycles (≈ 87 years minus 2 months) comes close (≈ 1,151.02 anomalistic months), so eclipses are similar in these groupings.

Series members between 1801 and 2200
1811 Sep 02 (Saros 115)	1840 Aug 13 (Saros 116)	1869 Jul 23 (Saros 117)
1898 Jul 03 (Saros 118)	1927 Jun 15 (Saros 119)	1956 May 24 (Saros 120)
1985 May 04 (Saros 121)	2014 Apr 15 (Saros 122)	2043 Mar 25 (Saros 123)
2072 Mar 04 (Saros 124)	2101 Feb 14 (Saros 125)	2130 Jan 24 (Saros 126)
2159 Jan 04 (Saros 127)	2187 Dec 15 (Saros 128)	

=== Half-Saros cycle ===
A lunar eclipse will be preceded and followed by solar eclipses by 9 years and 5.5 days (a half saros). This lunar eclipse is related to two annular solar eclipses of Solar Saros 128.

April 29, 1976	May 10, 1994

== See also ==
- List of lunar eclipses
- List of 20th-century lunar eclipses
