= Lunar Saros 123 =

Series of lunar eclipses

Member 52	Member 53
2007 Mar 03	2025 Mar 14

Saros cycle series 123 for lunar eclipses occurs at the moon's descending node, repeats every 18 years 11 and 1/3 days. It contains 72 events.

This lunar saros is linked to Solar Saros 130.

== List ==
Cat.	Saros	Mem	Date	Time UT (hr:mn)	Type	Gamma	Magnitude	Duration (min)			Contacts UT (hr:mn)						Chart
Cat.	Saros	Mem	Date	Greatest	Type	Gamma	Magnitude	Pen.	Par.	Tot.	P1	P4	U1	U2	U3	U4	Chart
07432	123	1	1087 Aug 16	21:27:44	Penumbral	-1.5358	-0.9548	51.8			21:01:50	21:53:38					
07479	123	2	1105 Aug 27	5:02:14	Penumbral	-1.488	-0.8699	98.6			4:12:56	5:51:32					
07525	123	3	1123 Sep 7	12:43:57	Penumbral	-1.4464	-0.7966	125.7			11:41:06	13:46:48					
07571	123	4	1141 Sep 17	20:32:05	Penumbral	-1.4106	-0.734	145.1			19:19:32	21:44:38					
07618	123	5	1159 Sep 29	4:27:05	Penumbral	-1.3809	-0.6826	159.5			3:07:20	5:46:50					
07665	123	6	1177 Oct 9	12:29:21	Penumbral	-1.3577	-0.6431	170.1			11:04:18	13:54:24					
07711	123	7	1195 Oct 20	20:38:39	Penumbral	-1.3406	-0.6146	178			19:09:39	22:07:39					
07757	123	8	1213 Oct 31	4:53:28	Penumbral	-1.3285	-0.5951	183.6			3:21:40	6:25:16					
07803	123	9	1231 Nov 11	13:14:04	Penumbral	-1.3215	-0.5849	187.3			11:40:25	14:47:43					
07848	123	10	1249 Nov 21	21:38:08	Penumbral	-1.3179	-0.5806	189.8			20:03:14	23:13:02					
07892	123	11	1267 Dec 03	6:05:09	Penumbral	-1.3174	-0.5817	191.1			4:29:36	7:40:42					
07937	123	12	1285 Dec 13	14:31:36	Penumbral	-1.3172	-0.5829	192.2			12:55:30	16:07:42					
07982	123	13	1303 Dec 24	22:58:34	Penumbral	-1.3179	-0.5856	192.9			21:22:07	0:35:01					
08025	123	14	1322 Jan 04	7:22:09	Penumbral	-1.3164	-0.5839	194.2			5:45:03	8:59:15					
08067	123	15	1340 Jan 15	15:41:50	Penumbral	-1.3126	-0.5776	196.3			14:03:41	17:19:59					
08109	123	16	1358 Jan 25	23:54:42	Penumbral	-1.3040	-0.5625	199.9			22:14:45	1:34:39					
08150	123	17	1376 Feb 06	8:01:19	Penumbral	-1.2911	-0.5390	204.9			6:18:52	9:43:46					
08191	123	18	1394 Feb 16	15:59:20	Penumbral	-1.2718	-0.5036	211.7			14:13:29	17:45:11					
08232	123	19	1412 Feb 27	23:47:40	Penumbral	-1.2454	-0.4551	220.3			21:57:31	1:37:49					
08274	123	20	1430 Mar 10	7:26:31	Penumbral	-1.2119	-0.3935	230.5			5:31:16	9:21:46					
08316	123	21	1448 Mar 20	14:55:10	Penumbral	-1.1709	-0.3180	242.1			12:54:07	16:56:13					
08357	123	22	1466 Mar 31	22:14:13	Penumbral	-1.1226	-0.2293	254.6			20:06:55	0:21:31					
08397	123	23	1484 Apr 11	5:22:47	Penumbral	-1.0662	-0.1257	267.9			3:08:50	7:36:44					
08437	123	24	1502 Apr 22	12:22:44	Penumbral	-1.0034	-0.0103	281.3			10:02:05	14:43:23					
08477	123	25	1520 May 2	19:14:16	Partial	-0.9344	0.1162	294.6	81.5		16:46:58	21:41:34	18:33:31			19:55:01	
08518	123	26	1538 May 14	1:58:00	Partial	-0.8594	0.2535	307.5	118.3		23:24:15	4:31:45	0:58:51			2:57:09	
08560	123	27	1556 May 24	8:36:04	Partial	-0.7802	0.3983	319.6	145.4		5:56:16	11:15:52	7:23:22			9:48:46	
08603	123	28	1574 Jun 04	15:09:13	Partial	-0.6977	0.5492	330.8	167.1		12:23:49	17:54:37	13:45:40			16:32:46	
08646	123	29	1592 Jun 24	21:40:12	Partial	-0.6135	0.7029	340.7	184.6		18:49:51	0:30:33	20:07:54			23:12:30	
08690	123	30	1610 Jul 06	4:08:03	Partial	-0.5273	0.8600	349.4	199.1		1:13:21	7:02:45	2:28:30			5:47:36	
08735	123	31	1628 Jul 16	10:36:57	Total	-0.4424	1.0147	356.8	210.5	19.9	7:38:33	13:35:21	8:51:42	10:27:00	10:46:54	12:22:12	
08779	123	32	1646 Jul 27	17:06:36	Total	-0.3586	1.1671	362.8	219.4	64.2	14:05:12	20:08:00	15:16:54	16:34:30	17:38:42	18:56:18	
08824	123	33	1664 Aug 06	23:40:04	Total	-0.2779	1.3135	367.6	226.0	83.5	20:36:16	2:43:52	21:47:04	22:58:19	0:21:49	1:33:04	
08870	123	34	1682 Aug 18	6:17:12	Total	-0.2006	1.4538	371.2	230.7	95.0	3:11:36	9:22:48	4:21:51	5:29:42	7:04:42	8:12:33	
08916	123	35	1700 Aug 29	13:01:24	Total	-0.1291	1.5833	373.8	233.7	101.7	9:54:30	16:08:18	11:04:33	12:10:33	13:52:15	14:58:15	
08962	123	36	1718 Sep 09	19:52:29	Total	-0.0635	1.7017	375.5	235.3	105.0	16:44:44	23:00:14	17:54:50	18:59:59	20:44:59	21:50:08	
09009	123	37	1736 Sep 20	2:51:00	Total	-0.0042	1.8087	376.4	235.8	106.0	23:42:48	5:59:12	0:53:06	1:58:00	3:44:00	4:48:54	
09056	123	38	1754 Oct 01	9:58:28	Total	0.0478	1.7268	376.8	235.5	105.2	6:50:04	13:06:52	8:00:43	9:05:52	10:51:04	11:56:13	
09102	123	39	1772 Oct 11	17:14:41	Total	0.0928	1.6425	376.9	234.7	103.3	14:06:14	20:23:08	15:17:20	16:23:02	18:06:20	19:12:02	
09147	123	40	1790 Oct 23	0:40:41	Total	0.1296	1.5734	376.7	233.6	100.9	21:32:20	3:49:02	22:43:53	23:50:14	1:31:08	2:37:29	
09192	123	41	1808 Nov 03	8:13:38	Total	0.1607	1.5148	376.3	232.3	98.1	5:05:29	11:21:47	6:17:29	7:24:35	9:02:41	10:09:47	
09237	123	42	1826 Nov 14	15:56:14	Total	0.1840	1.4709	375.9	231.2	95.6	12:48:17	19:04:11	14:00:38	15:08:26	16:44:02	17:51:50	
09284	123	43	1844 Nov 24	23:44:52	Total	0.2026	1.4358	375.4	230.2	93.3	20:37:10	2:52:34	21:49:46	22:58:13	0:31:31	1:39:58	
09329	123	44	1862 Dec 06	7:40:21	Total	0.2157	1.4112	374.9	229.3	91.5	4:32:54	10:47:48	5:45:42	6:54:36	8:26:06	9:35:00	
09373	123	45	1880 Dec 16	15:39:03	Total	0.2263	1.3914	374.4	228.6	89.9	12:31:51	18:46:15	13:44:45	14:54:06	16:24:00	17:33:21	
09417	123	46	1898 Dec 27	23:41:52	Total	0.2339	1.3777	373.8	228.0	88.8	20:34:58	2:48:46	21:47:52	22:57:28	0:26:16	1:35:52	
09459	123	47	1917 Jan 08	7:44:48	Total	0.2415	1.3642	373.1	227.3	87.6	4:38:15	10:51:21	5:51:09	7:01:00	8:28:36	9:38:27	
09501	123	48	1935 Jan 19	15:47:35	Total	0.2498	1.3499	372.1	226.7	86.3	12:41:32	18:53:38	13:54:14	15:04:26	16:30:44	17:40:56	
09542	123	49	1953 Jan 29	23:47:49	Total	0.2606	1.3314	371.0	225.8	84.5	20:42:19	2:53:19	21:54:55	23:05:34	0:30:04	1:40:43	
09583	123	50	1971 Feb 10	7:45:21	Total	0.2741	1.3082	369.5	224.7	82.2	4:40:36	10:50:06	5:53:00	7:04:15	8:26:27	9:37:42	
09624	123	51	1989 Feb 20	15:36:18	Total	0.2934	1.2747	367.7	223.1	78.5	12:32:27	18:40:09	13:44:45	14:57:03	16:15:33	17:27:51	
09665	123	52	2007 Mar 03	23:21:59	Total	0.3175	1.2328	365.4	221.1	73.4	20:19:17	2:24:41	21:31:26	22:45:17	23:58:41	1:12:32	
09706	123	53	2025 Mar 14	6:59:56	Total	0.3484	1.1784	362.6	218.3	65.4	3:58:38	10:01:14	5:10:47	6:27:14	7:32:38	8:49:05	
09747	123	54	2043 Mar 25	14:32:04	Total	0.3849	1.1142	359.3	214.6	53.4	11:32:25	17:31:43	12:44:46	14:05:22	14:58:46	16:19:22	
09788	123	55	2061 Apr 04	21:54:05	Total	0.4300	1.0341	355.0	209.6	29.9	18:56:35	0:51:35	20:09:17	21:39:08	22:09:02	23:38:53	
09829	123	56	2079 Apr 16	5:10:45	Partial	0.4799	0.9451	350.1	203.4		2:15:42	8:05:48	3:29:03			6:52:27	
09871	123	57	2097 Apr 26	12:18:17	Partial	0.5377	0.8420	344.0	195.2		9:26:17	15:10:17	10:40:41			13:55:53	
09913	123	58	2115 May 08	19:21:24	Partial	0.5996	0.7311	336.9	185.0		16:32:57	22:09:51	17:48:54			20:53:54	
09955	123	59	2133 May 19	2:16:19	Partial	0.6688	0.6067	328.4	171.6		23:32:07	5:00:31	0:50:31			3:42:07	
09999	123	60	2151 May 30	9:09:10	Partial	0.7403	0.4780	318.6	155.1		6:29:52	11:48:28	7:51:37			10:26:43	
10042	123	61	2169 Jun 09	15:57:06	Partial	0.8158	0.3416	307.2	133.5		13:23:30	18:30:42	14:50:21			17:03:51	
10085	123	62	2187 Jun 20	22:44:13	Partial	0.8928	0.2025	294.4	104.6		20:17:01	1:11:25	21:51:55			23:36:31	
10128	123	63	2205 Jul 02	5:29:54	Partial	0.9713	0.0603	279.8	58.0		3:10:00	7:49:48	5:00:54			5:58:54	
10172	123	64	2223 Jul 13	12:17:52	Penumbral	1.0485	-0.0797	263.7			10:06:01	14:29:43					
10217	123	65	2241 Jul 23	19:08:10	Penumbral	1.1245	-0.2177	245.9			17:05:13	21:11:07					
10262	123	66	2259 Aug 04	2:02:00	Penumbral	1.1981	-0.3516	226.3			0:08:51	3:55:09					
10308	123	67	2277 Aug 14	9:01:20	Penumbral	1.2678	-0.4785	205.3			7:18:41	10:43:59					
10355	123	68	2295 Aug 25	16:07:04	Penumbral	1.3328	-0.5971	182.5			14:35:49	17:38:19					
10401	123	69	2313 Sep 05	23:20:24	Penumbral	1.3925	-0.7061	158.0			22:01:24	0:39:24					
10447	123	70	2331 Sep 17	6:41:33	Penumbral	1.4465	-0.8048	131.1			5:36:00	7:47:06					
10493	123	71	2349 Sep 27	14:12:31	Penumbral	1.4935	-0.8907	101.4			13:21:49	15:03:13					
10538	123	72	2367 Oct 08	21:52:39	Penumbral	1.5336	-0.9642	65.4			21:19:57	22:25:21					

== See also ==
- List of lunar eclipses
  - List of Saros series for lunar eclipses
