= February 1971 lunar eclipse =

Total lunar eclipse February 10, 1971

- Total eclipse
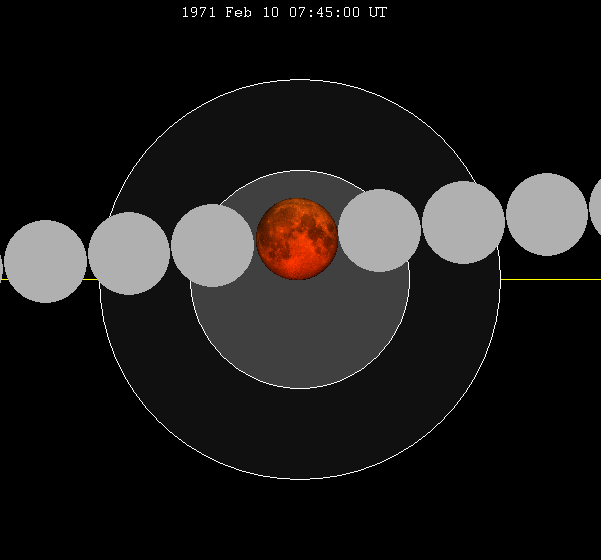
- The Moon's hourly motion shown right to left
- Date: February 10, 1971
- Gamma: 0.2741
- Magnitude: 1.3082
- Saros cycle: 123 (50 of 73)
- Totality: 82 minutes, 11 seconds
- Partiality: 224 minutes, 41 seconds
- Penumbral: 369 minutes, 31 seconds
Contacts (UTC)
- P1: 4:39:55
- U1: 5:52:18
- U2: 7:03:33
- Greatest: 7:44:40
- U3: 8:25:45
- U4: 9:36:59
- P4: 10:49:26

A total lunar eclipse occurred at the Moon’s descending node of orbit on Wednesday, February 10, 1971, with an umbral magnitude of 1.3082. A lunar eclipse occurs when the Moon moves into the Earth's shadow, causing the Moon to be darkened. A total lunar eclipse occurs when the Moon's near side entirely passes into the Earth's umbral shadow. Unlike a solar eclipse, which can only be viewed from a relatively small area of the world, a lunar eclipse may be viewed from anywhere on the night side of Earth. A total lunar eclipse can last up to nearly two hours, while a total solar eclipse lasts only a few minutes at any given place, because the Moon's shadow is smaller. Occurring about 2.8 days before apogee (on February 13, 1971, at 2:10 UTC), the Moon's apparent diameter was smaller.

== Visibility ==
The eclipse was completely visible over North America and northwestern South America, seen rising over east Asia and northeast Asia and Australia and setting over much of South America, Europe, and west and central Africa.

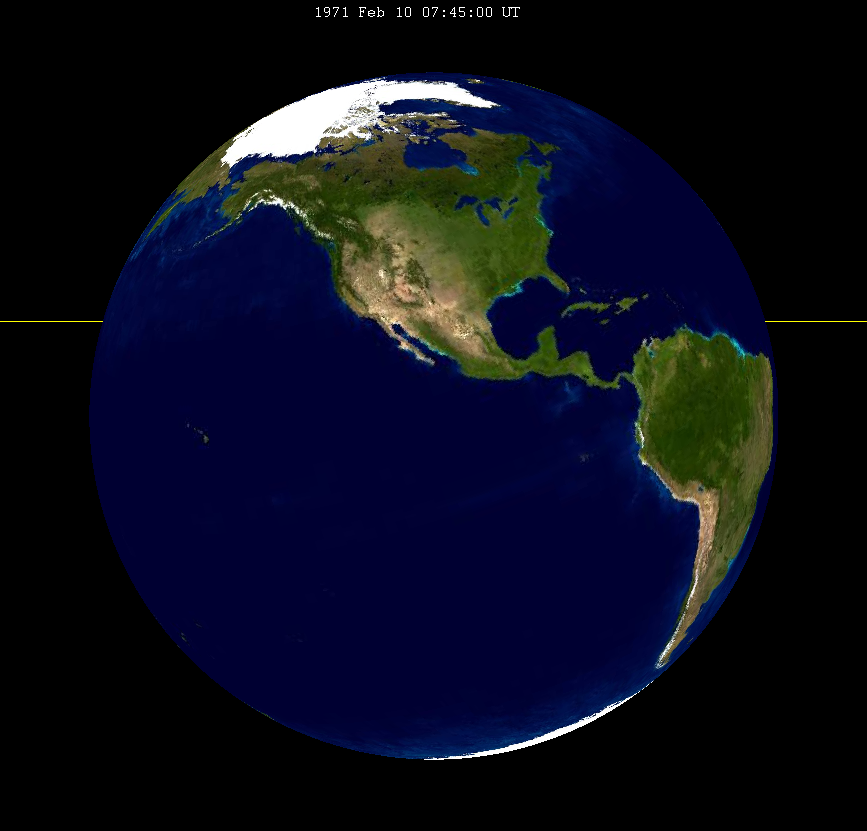
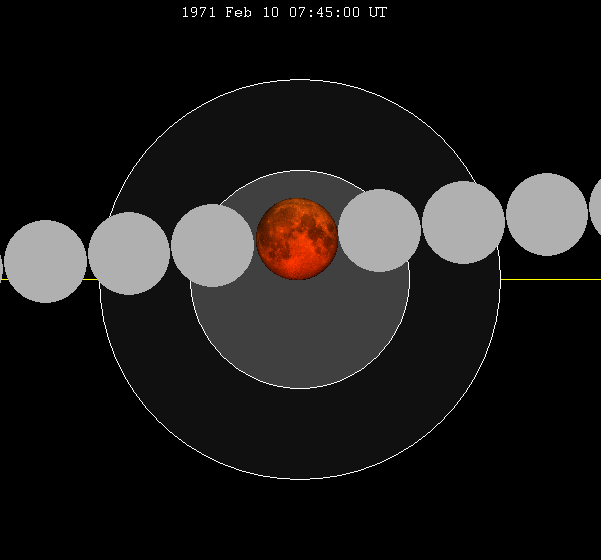

== Eclipse details ==
Shown below is a table displaying details about this particular solar eclipse. It describes various parameters pertaining to this eclipse.

February 10, 1971 Lunar Eclipse Parameters
Parameter	Value
Penumbral Magnitude	2.40262
Umbral Magnitude	1.30819
Gamma	0.27413
Sun Right Ascension	21h33m15.2s
Sun Declination	-14°31'31.4"
Sun Semi-Diameter	16'12.5"
Sun Equatorial Horizontal Parallax	08.9"
Moon Right Ascension	09h33m40.7s
Moon Declination	+14°45'05.5"
Moon Semi-Diameter	14'48.6"
Moon Equatorial Horizontal Parallax	0°54'21.2"
ΔT	41.3 s

== Eclipse season ==
This eclipse is part of an eclipse season, a period, roughly every six months, when eclipses occur. Only two (or occasionally three) eclipse seasons occur each year, and each season lasts about 35 days and repeats just short of six months (173 days) later; thus two full eclipse seasons always occur each year. Either two or three eclipses happen each eclipse season. In the sequence below, each eclipse is separated by a fortnight.

Eclipse season of February 1971
February 10 Descending node (full moon)	February 25 Ascending node (new moon)
Total lunar eclipse Lunar Saros 123	Partial solar eclipse Solar Saros 149

== Related eclipses ==
=== Eclipses in 1971 ===
- A total lunar eclipse on February 10.
- A partial solar eclipse on February 25.
- A partial solar eclipse on July 22.
- A total lunar eclipse on August 6.
- A partial solar eclipse on August 20.

=== Metonic ===
- Preceded by: Lunar eclipse of April 24, 1967
- Followed by: Lunar eclipse of November 29, 1974

=== Tzolkinex ===
- Preceded by: Lunar eclipse of December 30, 1963
- Followed by: Lunar eclipse of March 24, 1978

=== Half-Saros ===
- Preceded by: Solar eclipse of February 5, 1962
- Followed by: Solar eclipse of February 16, 1980

=== Tritos ===
- Preceded by: Lunar eclipse of March 13, 1960
- Followed by: Lunar eclipse of January 9, 1982

=== Lunar Saros 123 ===
- Preceded by: Lunar eclipse of January 29, 1953
- Followed by: Lunar eclipse of February 20, 1989

=== Inex ===
- Preceded by: Lunar eclipse of March 3, 1942
- Followed by: Lunar eclipse of January 21, 2000

=== Triad ===
- Preceded by: Lunar eclipse of April 10, 1884
- Followed by: Lunar eclipse of December 11, 2057

=== Lunar eclipses of 1969–1973 ===
This eclipse is a member of a semester series. An eclipse in a semester series of lunar eclipses repeats approximately every 177 days and 4 hours (a semester) at alternating nodes of the Moon's orbit.

The penumbral lunar eclipses on April 2, 1969 and September 25, 1969 occur in the previous lunar year eclipse set, and the lunar eclipses on June 15, 1973 (penumbral) and December 10, 1973 (partial) occur in the next lunar year eclipse set.

Lunar eclipse series sets from 1969 to 1973
Ascending node				Descending node			
Saros	Date Viewing	Type Chart	Gamma	Saros	Date Viewing	Type Chart	Gamma
108	1969 Aug 27	Penumbral	−1.5407	113	1970 Feb 21	Partial	0.9620
118	1970 Aug 17	Partial	−0.8053	123	1971 Feb 10	Total	0.2741
128	1971 Aug 06	Total	−0.0794	133	1972 Jan 30	Total	−0.4273
138	1972 Jul 26	Partial	0.7117	143	1973 Jan 18	Penumbral	−1.0845
148	1973 Jul 15	Penumbral	1.5178				

=== Saros 123 ===
This eclipse is a part of Saros series 123, repeating every 18 years, 11 days, and containing 72 events. The series started with a penumbral lunar eclipse on August 16, 1087. It contains partial eclipses from May 2, 1520 through July 6, 1610; total eclipses from July 16, 1628 through April 4, 2061; and a second set of partial eclipses from April 16, 2079 through July 2, 2205. The series ends at member 72 as a penumbral eclipse on October 8, 2367.

The longest duration of totality was produced by member 37 at 105 minutes, 58 seconds on September 20, 1736. All eclipses in this series occur at the Moon’s descending node of orbit.

Greatest	First			
The greatest eclipse of the series occurred on 1736 Sep 20, lasting 105 minutes, 58 seconds.	Penumbral	Partial	Total	Central
The greatest eclipse of the series occurred on 1736 Sep 20, lasting 105 minutes, 58 seconds.	1087 Aug 16	1520 May 02	1628 Jul 16	1682 Aug 18
The greatest eclipse of the series occurred on 1736 Sep 20, lasting 105 minutes, 58 seconds.	Last			
The greatest eclipse of the series occurred on 1736 Sep 20, lasting 105 minutes, 58 seconds.	Central	Total	Partial	Penumbral
The greatest eclipse of the series occurred on 1736 Sep 20, lasting 105 minutes, 58 seconds.	1953 Jan 29	2061 Apr 04	2205 Jul 02	2367 Oct 08

Eclipses are tabulated in three columns; every third eclipse in the same column is one exeligmos apart, so they all cast shadows over approximately the same parts of the Earth.

Series members 41–62 occur between 1801 and 2200:
41	42	43
1808 Nov 03	1826 Nov 14	1844 Nov 24
44	45	46
1862 Dec 06	1880 Dec 16	1898 Dec 27
47	48	49
1917 Jan 08	1935 Jan 19	1953 Jan 29
50	51	52
1971 Feb 10	1989 Feb 20	2007 Mar 03
53	54	55
2025 Mar 14	2043 Mar 25	2061 Apr 04
56	57	58
2079 Apr 16	2097 Apr 26	2115 May 08
59	60	61
2133 May 19	2151 May 30	2169 Jun 09
62
2187 Jun 20

=== Tritos series ===
This eclipse is a part of a tritos cycle, repeating at alternating nodes every 135 synodic months (≈ 3986.63 days, or 11 years minus 1 month). Their appearance and longitude are irregular due to a lack of synchronization with the anomalistic month (period of perigee), but groupings of 3 tritos cycles (≈ 33 years minus 3 months) come close (≈ 434.044 anomalistic months), so eclipses are similar in these groupings.

Series members between 1801 and 2200
1807 May 21 (Saros 108)	1818 Apr 21 (Saros 109)	1829 Mar 20 (Saros 110)	1840 Feb 17 (Saros 111)	1851 Jan 17 (Saros 112)
1861 Dec 17 (Saros 113)	1872 Nov 15 (Saros 114)	1883 Oct 16 (Saros 115)	1894 Sep 15 (Saros 116)	1905 Aug 15 (Saros 117)
1916 Jul 15 (Saros 118)	1927 Jun 15 (Saros 119)	1938 May 14 (Saros 120)	1949 Apr 13 (Saros 121)	1960 Mar 13 (Saros 122)
1971 Feb 10 (Saros 123)	1982 Jan 09 (Saros 124)	1992 Dec 09 (Saros 125)	2003 Nov 09 (Saros 126)	2014 Oct 08 (Saros 127)
2025 Sep 07 (Saros 128)	2036 Aug 07 (Saros 129)	2047 Jul 07 (Saros 130)	2058 Jun 06 (Saros 131)	2069 May 06 (Saros 132)
2080 Apr 04 (Saros 133)	2091 Mar 05 (Saros 134)	2102 Feb 03 (Saros 135)	2113 Jan 02 (Saros 136)	2123 Dec 03 (Saros 137)
2134 Nov 02 (Saros 138)	2145 Sep 30 (Saros 139)	2156 Aug 30 (Saros 140)	2167 Aug 01 (Saros 141)	2178 Jun 30 (Saros 142)
2189 May 29 (Saros 143)	2200 Apr 30 (Saros 144)			

=== Inex series ===
This eclipse is a part of the long period inex cycle, repeating at alternating nodes, every 358 synodic months (≈ 10,571.95 days, or 29 years minus 20 days). Their appearance and longitude are irregular due to a lack of synchronization with the anomalistic month (period of perigee). However, groupings of 3 inex cycles (≈ 87 years minus 2 months) comes close (≈ 1,151.02 anomalistic months), so eclipses are similar in these groupings.

Series members between 1801 and 2200
1826 May 21 (Saros 118)	1855 May 02 (Saros 119)	1884 Apr 10 (Saros 120)
1913 Mar 22 (Saros 121)	1942 Mar 03 (Saros 122)	1971 Feb 10 (Saros 123)
2000 Jan 21 (Saros 124)	2028 Dec 31 (Saros 125)	2057 Dec 11 (Saros 126)
2086 Nov 20 (Saros 127)	2115 Nov 02 (Saros 128)	2144 Oct 11 (Saros 129)
2173 Sep 21 (Saros 130)

=== Half-Saros cycle ===
A lunar eclipse will be preceded and followed by solar eclipses by 9 years and 5.5 days (a half saros). This lunar eclipse is related to two total solar eclipses of Solar Saros 130.

February 5, 1962	February 16, 1980

== See also ==
- List of lunar eclipses
- List of 20th-century lunar eclipses
