= Solar eclipse of July 24, 2074 =

Future annular solar eclipse

- Annular eclipse
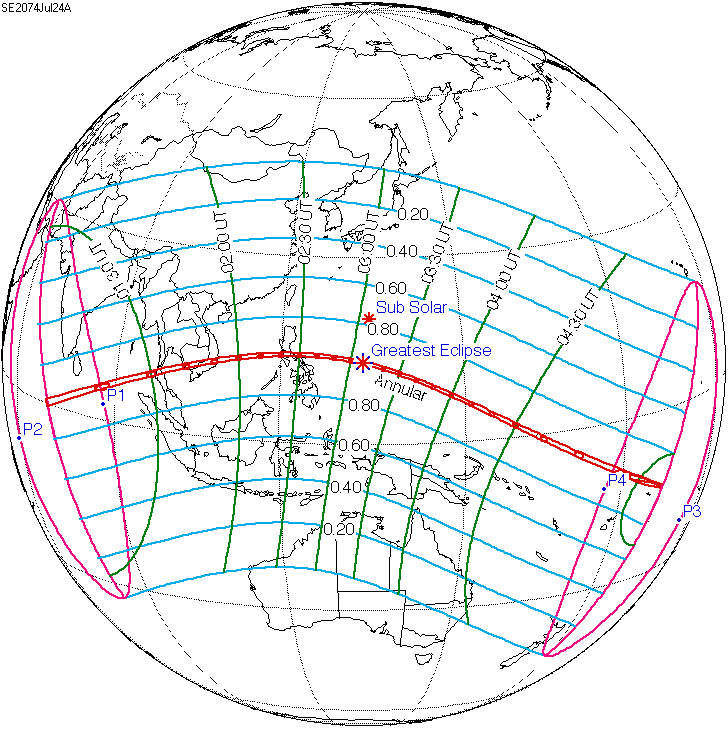
- Map
- Gamma: −0.1242
- Magnitude: 0.9838

Maximum eclipse
- Duration: 117 s (1 min 57 s)
- Coordinates: 12.8°N 133.7°E
- Max. width of band: 58 km (36 mi)

Times (UTC)
- Greatest eclipse: 3:10:32

References
- Saros: 137 (39 of 70)
- Catalog # (SE5000): 9674

An annular solar eclipse will occur at the Moon's ascending node of orbit on Tuesday, July 24, 2074, with a magnitude of 0.9838. A solar eclipse occurs when the Moon passes between Earth and the Sun, thereby totally or partly obscuring the image of the Sun for a viewer on Earth. An annular solar eclipse occurs when the Moon's apparent diameter is smaller than the Sun's, blocking most of the Sun's light and causing the Sun to look like an annulus (ring). An annular eclipse appears as a partial eclipse over a region of the Earth thousands of kilometres wide. Occurring about 5.6 days after perigee (on July 18, 2074, at 13:55 UTC), the Moon's apparent diameter will be larger.

The path of annularity will be visible from parts of the Maldives, the Andaman and Nicobar Islands, Thailand, Cambodia, Vietnam, the Philippines, Micronesia, and Tuvalu. A partial solar eclipse will also be visible for parts of South Asia, Southeast Asia, East Asia, northern Australia, and Oceania.

== Eclipse details ==
Shown below are two tables displaying details about this particular solar eclipse. The first table outlines times at which the Moon's penumbra or umbra attains the specific parameter, and the second table describes various other parameters pertaining to this eclipse.

July 24, 2074 Solar Eclipse Times
Event	Time (UTC)
First Penumbral External Contact	2074 July 24 at 00:14:11.6 UTC
First Umbral External Contact	2074 July 24 at 01:16:38.3 UTC
First Central Line	2074 July 24 at 01:17:41.6 UTC
Greatest Duration	2074 July 24 at 01:17:41.6 UTC
First Umbral Internal Contact	2074 July 24 at 01:18:44.9 UTC
First Penumbral Internal Contact	2074 July 24 at 02:21:59.4 UTC
Ecliptic Conjunction	2074 July 24 at 03:09:07.3 UTC
Greatest Eclipse	2074 July 24 at 03:10:32.0 UTC
Equatorial Conjunction	2074 July 24 at 03:12:17.6 UTC
Last Penumbral Internal Contact	2074 July 24 at 03:59:02.9 UTC
Last Umbral Internal Contact	2074 July 24 at 05:02:19.9 UTC
Last Central Line	2074 July 24 at 05:03:20.4 UTC
Last Umbral External Contact	2074 July 24 at 05:04:21.0 UTC
Last Penumbral External Contact	2074 July 24 at 06:06:45.5 UTC

July 24, 2074 Solar Eclipse Parameters
Parameter	Value
Eclipse Magnitude	0.98381
Eclipse Obscuration	0.96787
Gamma	−0.12424
Sun Right Ascension	08h15m33.5s
Sun Declination	+19°47'02.4"
Sun Semi-Diameter	15'44.6"
Sun Equatorial Horizontal Parallax	08.7"
Moon Right Ascension	08h15m29.9s
Moon Declination	+19°40'09.4"
Moon Semi-Diameter	15'15.0"
Moon Equatorial Horizontal Parallax	0°55'58.2"
ΔT	101.0 s

== Eclipse season ==
This eclipse is part of an eclipse season, a period, roughly every six months, when eclipses occur. Only two (or occasionally three) eclipse seasons occur each year, and each season lasts about 35 days and repeats just short of six months (173 days) later; thus two full eclipse seasons always occur each year. Either two or three eclipses happen each eclipse season. In the sequence below, each eclipse is separated by a fortnight. The first and last eclipse in this sequence is separated by one synodic month.

Eclipse season of July–August 2074
July 8 Descending node (full moon)	July 24 Ascending node (new moon)	August 7 Descending node (full moon)
Penumbral lunar eclipse Lunar Saros 111	Annular solar eclipse Solar Saros 137	Penumbral lunar eclipse Lunar Saros 149

== Related eclipses ==
=== Eclipses in 2074 ===
- An annular solar eclipse on January 27.
- A penumbral lunar eclipse on February 11.
- A penumbral lunar eclipse on July 8.
- An annular solar eclipse on July 24.
- A penumbral lunar eclipse on August 7.

=== Metonic ===
- Preceded by: Solar eclipse of October 4, 2070
- Followed by: Solar eclipse of May 11, 2078

=== Tzolkinex ===
- Preceded by: Solar eclipse of June 11, 2067
- Followed by: Solar eclipse of September 3, 2081

=== Half-Saros ===
- Preceded by: Lunar eclipse of July 17, 2065
- Followed by: Lunar eclipse of July 29, 2083

=== Tritos ===
- Preceded by: Solar eclipse of August 24, 2063
- Followed by: Solar eclipse of June 22, 2085

=== Solar Saros 137 ===
- Preceded by: Solar eclipse of July 12, 2056
- Followed by: Solar eclipse of August 3, 2092

=== Inex ===
- Preceded by: Solar eclipse of August 12, 2045
- Followed by: Solar eclipse of July 4, 2103

=== Triad ===
- Preceded by: Solar eclipse of September 23, 1987
- Followed by: Solar eclipse of May 25, 2161

=== Solar eclipses of 2073–2076 ===
This eclipse is a member of a semester series. An eclipse in a semester series of solar eclipses repeats approximately every 177 days and 4 hours (a semester) at alternating nodes of the Moon's orbit.

The partial solar eclipses on June 1, 2076 and November 26, 2076 occur in the next lunar year eclipse set.

Solar eclipse series sets from 2073 to 2076
Descending node			Ascending node		
Saros	Map	Gamma	Saros	Map	Gamma
122	February 7, 2073 Partial	1.1651	127	August 3, 2073 Total	−0.8763
132	January 27, 2074 Annular	0.4251	137	July 24, 2074 Annular	−0.1242
142	January 16, 2075 Total	−0.2799	147	July 13, 2075 Annular	0.6583
152	January 6, 2076 Total	−0.9373	157	July 1, 2076 Partial	1.4005

=== Saros 137 ===
This eclipse is a part of Saros series 137, repeating every 18 years, 11 days, and containing 70 events. The series started with a partial solar eclipse on May 25, 1389. It contains total eclipses from August 20, 1533 through December 6, 1695; the first set of hybrid eclipses from December 17, 1713 through February 11, 1804; the first set of annular eclipses from February 21, 1822 through March 25, 1876; the second set of hybrid eclipses from April 6, 1894 through April 28, 1930; and the second set of annular eclipses from May 9, 1948 through April 13, 2507. The series ends at member 70 as a partial eclipse on June 28, 2633. Its eclipses are tabulated in three columns; every third eclipse in the same column is one exeligmos apart, so they all cast shadows over approximately the same parts of the Earth.

The longest duration of totality was produced by member 11 at 2 minutes, 55 seconds on September 10, 1569, and the longest duration of annularity will be produced by member 59 at 7 minutes, 5 seconds on February 28, 2435. All eclipses in this series occur at the Moon’s ascending node of orbit.

Series members 24–46 occur between 1801 and 2200:
24	25	26
February 11, 1804	February 21, 1822	March 4, 1840
27	28	29
March 15, 1858	March 25, 1876	April 6, 1894
30	31	32
April 17, 1912	April 28, 1930	May 9, 1948
33	34	35
May 20, 1966	May 30, 1984	June 10, 2002
36	37	38
June 21, 2020	July 2, 2038	July 12, 2056
39	40	41
July 24, 2074	August 3, 2092	August 15, 2110
42	43	44
August 25, 2128	September 6, 2146	September 16, 2164
45	46	
September 27, 2182	October 9, 2200	

=== Metonic series ===
The metonic series repeats eclipses every 19 years (6939.69 days), lasting about 5 cycles. Eclipses occur in nearly the same calendar date. In addition, the octon subseries repeats 1/5 of that or every 3.8 years (1387.94 days). All eclipses in this table occur at the Moon's ascending node.

21 eclipse events between July 23, 2036 and July 23, 2112
July 23–24	May 11	February 27–28	December 16–17	October 4–5
117	119	121	123	125
July 23, 2036	May 11, 2040	February 28, 2044	December 16, 2047	October 4, 2051
127	129	131	133	135
July 24, 2055	May 11, 2059	February 28, 2063	December 17, 2066	October 4, 2070
137	139	141	143	145
July 24, 2074	May 11, 2078	February 27, 2082	December 16, 2085	October 4, 2089
147	149	151	153	155
July 23, 2093	May 11, 2097	February 28, 2101	December 17, 2104	October 5, 2108
157
July 23, 2112

=== Tritos series ===
This eclipse is a part of a tritos cycle, repeating at alternating nodes every 135 synodic months (≈ 3986.63 days, or 11 years minus 1 month). Their appearance and longitude are irregular due to a lack of synchronization with the anomalistic month (period of perigee), but groupings of 3 tritos cycles (≈ 33 years minus 3 months) come close (≈ 434.044 anomalistic months), so eclipses are similar in these groupings.

Series members between 1801 and 2200
September 8, 1801 (Saros 112)	August 7, 1812 (Saros 113)	July 8, 1823 (Saros 114)	June 7, 1834 (Saros 115)	May 6, 1845 (Saros 116)
April 5, 1856 (Saros 117)	March 6, 1867 (Saros 118)	February 2, 1878 (Saros 119)	January 1, 1889 (Saros 120)	December 3, 1899 (Saros 121)
November 2, 1910 (Saros 122)	October 1, 1921 (Saros 123)	August 31, 1932 (Saros 124)	August 1, 1943 (Saros 125)	June 30, 1954 (Saros 126)
May 30, 1965 (Saros 127)	April 29, 1976 (Saros 128)	March 29, 1987 (Saros 129)	February 26, 1998 (Saros 130)	January 26, 2009 (Saros 131)
December 26, 2019 (Saros 132)	November 25, 2030 (Saros 133)	October 25, 2041 (Saros 134)	September 22, 2052 (Saros 135)	August 24, 2063 (Saros 136)
July 24, 2074 (Saros 137)	June 22, 2085 (Saros 138)	May 22, 2096 (Saros 139)	April 23, 2107 (Saros 140)	March 22, 2118 (Saros 141)
February 18, 2129 (Saros 142)	January 20, 2140 (Saros 143)	December 19, 2150 (Saros 144)	November 17, 2161 (Saros 145)	October 17, 2172 (Saros 146)
September 16, 2183 (Saros 147)	August 16, 2194 (Saros 148)			

=== Inex series ===
This eclipse is a part of the long period inex cycle, repeating at alternating nodes, every 358 synodic months (≈ 10,571.95 days, or 29 years minus 20 days). Their appearance and longitude are irregular due to a lack of synchronization with the anomalistic month (period of perigee). However, groupings of 3 inex cycles (≈ 87 years minus 2 months) comes close (≈ 1,151.02 anomalistic months), so eclipses are similar in these groupings.

Series members between 1801 and 2200
January 21, 1814 (Saros 128)	December 31, 1842 (Saros 129)	December 12, 1871 (Saros 130)
November 22, 1900 (Saros 131)	November 1, 1929 (Saros 132)	October 12, 1958 (Saros 133)
September 23, 1987 (Saros 134)	September 1, 2016 (Saros 135)	August 12, 2045 (Saros 136)
July 24, 2074 (Saros 137)	July 4, 2103 (Saros 138)	June 13, 2132 (Saros 139)
May 25, 2161 (Saros 140)	May 4, 2190 (Saros 141)	
