= Solar eclipse of December 12, 1871 =

Total eclipse

- Total eclipse
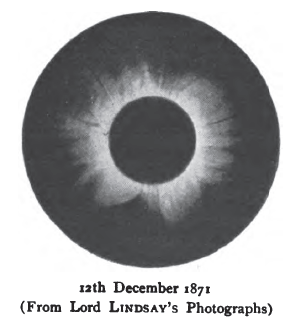

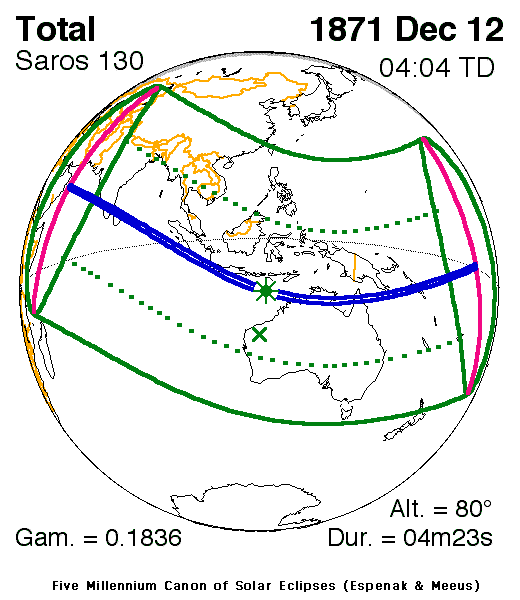
- Map
- Gamma: 0.1836
- Magnitude: 1.0465

Maximum eclipse
- Duration: 263 s (4 min 23 s)
- Coordinates: 12.7°S 119.4°E
- Max. width of band: 157 km (98 mi)

Times (UTC)
- Greatest eclipse: 4:03:38

References
- Saros: 130 (44 of 73)
- Catalog # (SE5000): 9215

A total solar eclipse occurred at the Moon's descending node of orbit on Tuesday, December 12, 1871, with a magnitude of 1.0465. A solar eclipse occurs when the Moon passes between Earth and the Sun, thereby totally or partly obscuring the image of the Sun for a viewer on Earth. A total solar eclipse occurs when the Moon's apparent diameter is larger than the Sun's, blocking all direct sunlight, turning day into darkness. Totality occurs in a narrow path across Earth's surface, with the partial solar eclipse visible over a surrounding region thousands of kilometres wide. Occurring about 10.5 hours before perigee (on December 12, 1871, at 14:40 UTC), the Moon's apparent diameter was larger.

The path of totality was visible from parts of modern-day India, Indonesia, Australia, and the Solomon Islands. A partial solar eclipse was also visible for parts of the Middle East, Central Asia, South Asia, Southeast Asia, Australia, and Oceania.

== Eclipse details ==
Shown below are two tables displaying details about this particular solar eclipse. The first table outlines times at which the Moon's penumbra or umbra attains the specific parameter, and the second table describes various other parameters pertaining to this eclipse.

December 12, 1871 Solar Eclipse Times
Event	Time (UTC)
First Penumbral External Contact	1871 December 12 at 01:26:08.7 UTC
First Umbral External Contact	1871 December 12 at 02:21:32.0 UTC
First Central Line	1871 December 12 at 02:22:19.2 UTC
First Umbral Internal Contact	1871 December 12 at 02:23:06.3 UTC
First Penumbral Internal Contact	1871 December 12 at 03:20:05.5 UTC
Equatorial Conjunction	1871 December 12 at 04:00:15.7 UTC
Ecliptic Conjunction	1871 December 12 at 04:01:45.0 UTC
Greatest Eclipse	1871 December 12 at 04:03:38.0 UTC
Greatest Duration	1871 December 12 at 04:07:16.3 UTC
Last Penumbral Internal Contact	1871 December 12 at 04:47:15.4 UTC
Last Umbral Internal Contact	1871 December 12 at 05:44:11.2 UTC
Last Central Line	1871 December 12 at 05:44:58.8 UTC
Last Umbral External Contact	1871 December 12 at 05:45:46.5 UTC
Last Penumbral External Contact	1871 December 12 at 06:41:07.5 UTC

December 12, 1871 Solar Eclipse Parameters
Parameter	Value
Eclipse Magnitude	1.04651
Eclipse Obscuration	1.09519
Gamma	0.18356
Sun Right Ascension	17h15m20.1s
Sun Declination	-23°03'31.7"
Sun Semi-Diameter	16'14.9"
Sun Equatorial Horizontal Parallax	08.9"
Moon Right Ascension	17h15m28.6s
Moon Declination	-22°52'28.0"
Moon Semi-Diameter	16'43.2"
Moon Equatorial Horizontal Parallax	1°01'21.7"
ΔT	-1.0 s

== Eclipse season ==
This eclipse is part of an eclipse season, a period, roughly every six months, when eclipses occur. Only two (or occasionally three) eclipse seasons occur each year, and each season lasts about 35 days and repeats just short of six months (173 days) later; thus two full eclipse seasons always occur each year. Either two or three eclipses happen each eclipse season. In the sequence below, each eclipse is separated by a fortnight.

Eclipse season of December 1871
December 12 Descending node (new moon)	December 26 Ascending node (full moon)
Total solar eclipse Solar Saros 130	Penumbral lunar eclipse Lunar Saros 142

== Related eclipses ==
=== Eclipses in 1871 ===
- A partial lunar eclipse on January 6.
- An annular solar eclipse on June 18.
- A partial lunar eclipse on July 2.
- A total solar eclipse on December 12.
- A penumbral lunar eclipse on December 26.

=== Metonic ===
- Preceded by: Solar eclipse of February 23, 1868
- Followed by: Solar eclipse of September 29, 1875

=== Tzolkinex ===
- Preceded by: Solar eclipse of October 30, 1864
- Followed by: Solar eclipse of January 22, 1879

=== Half-Saros ===
- Preceded by: Lunar eclipse of December 6, 1862
- Followed by: Lunar eclipse of December 16, 1880

=== Tritos ===
- Preceded by: Solar eclipse of January 11, 1861
- Followed by: Solar eclipse of November 10, 1882

=== Solar Saros 130 ===
- Preceded by: Solar eclipse of November 30, 1853
- Followed by: Solar eclipse of December 22, 1889

=== Inex ===
- Preceded by: Solar eclipse of December 31, 1842
- Followed by: Solar eclipse of November 22, 1900

=== Triad ===
- Preceded by: Solar eclipse of February 9, 1785
- Followed by: Solar eclipse of October 12, 1958

=== Solar eclipses of 1870–1873 ===
This eclipse is a member of a semester series. An eclipse in a semester series of solar eclipses repeats approximately every 177 days and 4 hours (a semester) at alternating nodes of the Moon's orbit.

The partial solar eclipses on January 31, 1870 and July 28, 1870 occurs in the previous lunar year eclipse set.

Solar eclipse series sets from 1870 to 1873
Ascending node			Descending node		
Saros	Map	Gamma	Saros	Map	Gamma
115	June 28, 1870 Partial	−1.1949	120	December 22, 1870 Total	0.8585
125	June 18, 1871 Annular	−0.4550	130	December 12, 1871 Total	0.1836
135	June 6, 1872 Annular	0.3095	140	November 30, 1872 Hybrid	−0.5081
145	May 26, 1873 Partial	1.0513	150	November 20, 1873 Partial	−1.2625

=== Saros 130 ===
This eclipse is a part of Saros series 130, repeating every 18 years, 11 days, and containing 73 events. The series started with a partial solar eclipse on August 20, 1096. It contains total eclipses from April 5, 1475 through July 18, 2232. There are no annular or hybrid eclipses in this set. The series ends at member 73 as a partial eclipse on October 25, 2394. Its eclipses are tabulated in three columns; every third eclipse in the same column is one exeligmos apart, so they all cast shadows over approximately the same parts of the Earth.

The longest duration of totality was produced by member 30 at 6 minutes, 41 seconds on July 11, 1619. All eclipses in this series occur at the Moon’s descending node of orbit.

Series members 41–62 occur between 1801 and 2200:
41	42	43
November 9, 1817	November 20, 1835	November 30, 1853
44	45	46
December 12, 1871	December 22, 1889	January 3, 1908
47	48	49
January 14, 1926	January 25, 1944	February 5, 1962
50	51	52
February 16, 1980	February 26, 1998	March 9, 2016
53	54	55
March 20, 2034	March 30, 2052	April 11, 2070
56	57	58
April 21, 2088	May 3, 2106	May 14, 2124
59	60	61
May 25, 2142	June 4, 2160	June 16, 2178
62
June 26, 2196

=== Metonic series ===
The metonic series repeats eclipses every 19 years (6939.69 days), lasting about 5 cycles. Eclipses occur in nearly the same calendar date. In addition, the octon subseries repeats 1/5 of that or every 3.8 years (1387.94 days). All eclipses in this table occur at the Moon's descending node.

22 eclipse events between February 23, 1830 and July 19, 1917
February 22–23	December 11–12	September 29–30	July 18–19	May 6–7
108	110	112	114	116
February 23, 1830			July 18, 1841	May 6, 1845
118	120	122	124	126
February 23, 1849	December 11, 1852	September 29, 1856	July 18, 1860	May 6, 1864
128	130	132	134	136
February 23, 1868	December 12, 1871	September 29, 1875	July 19, 1879	May 6, 1883
138	140	142	144	146
February 22, 1887	December 12, 1890	September 29, 1894	July 18, 1898	May 7, 1902
148	150	152	154	
February 23, 1906	December 12, 1909	September 30, 1913	July 19, 1917	

=== Tritos series ===
This eclipse is a part of a tritos cycle, repeating at alternating nodes every 135 synodic months (≈ 3986.63 days, or 11 years minus 1 month). Their appearance and longitude are irregular due to a lack of synchronization with the anomalistic month (period of perigee), but groupings of 3 tritos cycles (≈ 33 years minus 3 months) come close (≈ 434.044 anomalistic months), so eclipses are similar in these groupings.

Series members between 1801 and 2200
June 16, 1806 (Saros 124)	May 16, 1817 (Saros 125)	April 14, 1828 (Saros 126)	March 15, 1839 (Saros 127)	February 12, 1850 (Saros 128)
January 11, 1861 (Saros 129)	December 12, 1871 (Saros 130)	November 10, 1882 (Saros 131)	October 9, 1893 (Saros 132)	September 9, 1904 (Saros 133)
August 10, 1915 (Saros 134)	July 9, 1926 (Saros 135)	June 8, 1937 (Saros 136)	May 9, 1948 (Saros 137)	April 8, 1959 (Saros 138)
March 7, 1970 (Saros 139)	February 4, 1981 (Saros 140)	January 4, 1992 (Saros 141)	December 4, 2002 (Saros 142)	November 3, 2013 (Saros 143)
October 2, 2024 (Saros 144)	September 2, 2035 (Saros 145)	August 2, 2046 (Saros 146)	July 1, 2057 (Saros 147)	May 31, 2068 (Saros 148)
May 1, 2079 (Saros 149)	March 31, 2090 (Saros 150)	February 28, 2101 (Saros 151)	January 29, 2112 (Saros 152)	December 28, 2122 (Saros 153)
November 26, 2133 (Saros 154)	October 26, 2144 (Saros 155)	September 26, 2155 (Saros 156)	August 25, 2166 (Saros 157)	July 25, 2177 (Saros 158)
June 24, 2188 (Saros 159)	May 24, 2199 (Saros 160)			

=== Inex series ===
This eclipse is a part of the long period inex cycle, repeating at alternating nodes, every 358 synodic months (≈ 10,571.95 days, or 29 years minus 20 days). Their appearance and longitude are irregular due to a lack of synchronization with the anomalistic month (period of perigee). However, groupings of 3 inex cycles (≈ 87 years minus 2 months) comes close (≈ 1,151.02 anomalistic months), so eclipses are similar in these groupings.

Series members between 1801 and 2200
January 21, 1814 (Saros 128)	December 31, 1842 (Saros 129)	December 12, 1871 (Saros 130)
November 22, 1900 (Saros 131)	November 1, 1929 (Saros 132)	October 12, 1958 (Saros 133)
September 23, 1987 (Saros 134)	September 1, 2016 (Saros 135)	August 12, 2045 (Saros 136)
July 24, 2074 (Saros 137)	July 4, 2103 (Saros 138)	June 13, 2132 (Saros 139)
May 25, 2161 (Saros 140)	May 4, 2190 (Saros 141)	
