= Solar eclipse of November 30, 1853 =

Total eclipse

- Total eclipse
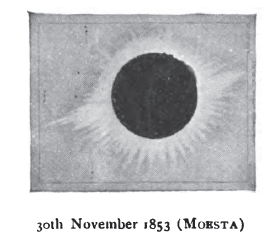

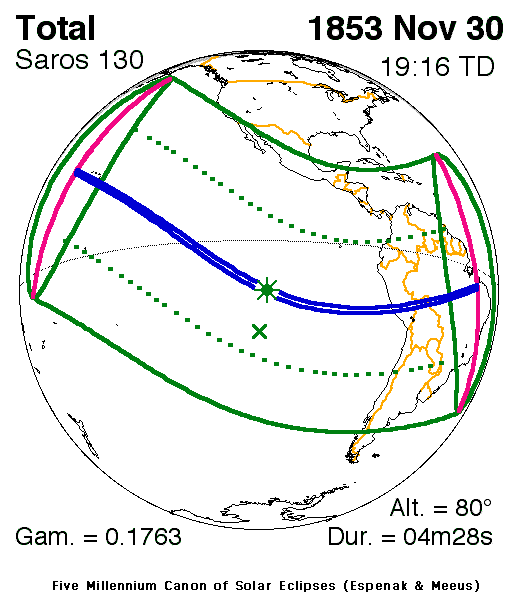
- Map
- Gamma: 0.1763
- Magnitude: 1.0485

Maximum eclipse
- Duration: 268 s (4 min 28 s)
- Coordinates: 12°S 109°W
- Max. width of band: 164 km (102 mi)

Times (UTC)
- Greatest eclipse: 19:15:39

References
- Saros: 130 (43 of 73)
- Catalog # (SE5000): 9172

A total solar eclipse occurred at the Moon's descending node of orbit on Wednesday, November 30, 1853, with a magnitude of 1.0485. A solar eclipse occurs when the Moon passes between Earth and the Sun, thereby totally or partly obscuring the image of the Sun for a viewer on Earth. A total solar eclipse occurs when the Moon's apparent diameter is larger than the Sun's, blocking all direct sunlight, turning day into darkness. Totality occurs in a narrow path across Earth's surface, with the partial solar eclipse visible over a surrounding region thousands of kilometres wide. Occurring about 8.5 hours before perigee (on December 1, 1853, at 3:45 UTC), the Moon's apparent diameter was larger.

The path of totality was visible from parts of modern-day Peru, Bolivia, and Brazil. A partial solar eclipse was also visible for parts of northern Oceania, Hawaii, southern North America, Central America, the Caribbean, and South America.

== Eclipse details ==
Shown below are two tables displaying details about this particular solar eclipse. The first table outlines times at which the Moon's penumbra or umbra attains the specific parameter, and the second table describes various other parameters pertaining to this eclipse.

November 30, 1853 Solar Eclipse Times
Event	Time (UTC)
First Penumbral External Contact	1853 November 30 at 16:38:15.3 UTC
First Umbral External Contact	1853 November 30 at 17:33:27.1 UTC
First Central Line	1853 November 30 at 17:34:17.3 UTC
First Umbral Internal Contact	1853 November 30 at 17:35:07.5 UTC
First Penumbral Internal Contact	1853 November 30 at 18:31:47.1 UTC
Equatorial Conjunction	1853 November 30 at 19:10:53.1 UTC
Ecliptic Conjunction	1853 November 30 at 19:13:50.5 UTC
Greatest Eclipse	1853 November 30 at 19:15:38.7 UTC
Greatest Duration	1853 November 30 at 19:20:35.5 UTC
Last Penumbral Internal Contact	1853 November 30 at 19:59:37.3 UTC
Last Umbral Internal Contact	1853 November 30 at 20:56:12.6 UTC
Last Central Line	1853 November 30 at 20:57:03.2 UTC
Last Umbral External Contact	1853 November 30 at 20:57:53.8 UTC
Last Penumbral External Contact	1853 November 30 at 21:53:03.3 UTC

November 30, 1853 Solar Eclipse Parameters
Parameter	Value
Eclipse Magnitude	1.04851
Eclipse Obscuration	1.09938
Gamma	0.17631
Sun Right Ascension	16h27m18.6s
Sun Declination	-21°44'59.0"
Sun Semi-Diameter	16'13.6"
Sun Equatorial Horizontal Parallax	08.9"
Moon Right Ascension	16h27m30.3s
Moon Declination	-21°34'32.2"
Moon Semi-Diameter	16'43.7"
Moon Equatorial Horizontal Parallax	1°01'23.6"
ΔT	7.1 s

== Eclipse season ==
This eclipse is part of an eclipse season, a period, roughly every six months, when eclipses occur. Only two (or occasionally three) eclipse seasons occur each year, and each season lasts about 35 days and repeats just short of six months (173 days) later; thus two full eclipse seasons always occur each year. Either two or three eclipses happen each eclipse season. In the sequence below, each eclipse is separated by a fortnight.

Eclipse season of November–December 1853
November 30 Descending node (new moon)	December 15 Ascending node (full moon)
Total solar eclipse Solar Saros 130	Penumbral lunar eclipse Lunar Saros 142

== Related eclipses ==
=== Eclipses in 1853 ===
- An annular solar eclipse on June 6.
- A partial lunar eclipse on June 21.
- A total solar eclipse on November 30.
- A penumbral lunar eclipse on December 15.

=== Metonic ===
- Preceded by: Solar eclipse of January 21, 1852
- Followed by: Solar eclipse of August 28, 1859

=== Tzolkinex ===
- Preceded by: Solar eclipse of October 20, 1846
- Followed by: Solar eclipse of January 11, 1861

=== Half-Saros ===
- Preceded by: Lunar eclipse of November 24, 1844
- Followed by: Lunar eclipse of December 6, 1862

=== Tritos ===
- Preceded by: Solar eclipse of December 31, 1842
- Followed by: Solar eclipse of October 30, 1864

=== Solar Saros 130 ===
- Preceded by: Solar eclipse of November 20, 1835
- Followed by: Solar eclipse of December 12, 1871

=== Inex ===
- Preceded by: Solar eclipse of December 20, 1824
- Followed by: Solar eclipse of November 10, 1882

=== Triad ===
- Preceded by: Solar eclipse of January 30, 1767
- Followed by: Solar eclipse of October 1, 1940

=== Solar eclipses of 1852–1855 ===
This eclipse is a member of a semester series. An eclipse in a semester series of solar eclipses repeats approximately every 177 days and 4 hours (a semester) at alternating nodes of the Moon's orbit.

The partial solar eclipse on January 21, 1852 occurred in the previous lunar year eclipse set.

Solar eclipse series sets from 1852 to 1855
Ascending node			Descending node		
Saros	Map	Gamma	Saros	Map	Gamma
115	June 17, 1852 Partial	−1.1111	120	December 11, 1852 Total	0.8551
125	June 6, 1853 Annular	−0.3686	130	November 30, 1853 Total	0.1763
135	May 26, 1854 Annular	0.3918	140	November 20, 1854 Hybrid	−0.5179
145	May 16, 1855 Partial	1.1249	150	November 9, 1855 Partial	−1.2767

=== Saros 130 ===
This eclipse is a part of Saros series 130, repeating every 18 years, 11 days, and containing 73 events. The series started with a partial solar eclipse on August 20, 1096. It contains total eclipses from April 5, 1475 through July 18, 2232. There are no annular or hybrid eclipses in this set. The series ends at member 73 as a partial eclipse on October 25, 2394. Its eclipses are tabulated in three columns; every third eclipse in the same column is one exeligmos apart, so they all cast shadows over approximately the same parts of the Earth.

The longest duration of totality was produced by member 30 at 6 minutes, 41 seconds on July 11, 1619. All eclipses in this series occur at the Moon’s descending node of orbit.

Series members 41–62 occur between 1801 and 2200:
41	42	43
November 9, 1817	November 20, 1835	November 30, 1853
44	45	46
December 12, 1871	December 22, 1889	January 3, 1908
47	48	49
January 14, 1926	January 25, 1944	February 5, 1962
50	51	52
February 16, 1980	February 26, 1998	March 9, 2016
53	54	55
March 20, 2034	March 30, 2052	April 11, 2070
56	57	58
April 21, 2088	May 3, 2106	May 14, 2124
59	60	61
May 25, 2142	June 4, 2160	June 16, 2178
62
June 26, 2196

=== Metonic series ===
The metonic series repeats eclipses every 19 years (6939.69 days), lasting about 5 cycles. Eclipses occur in nearly the same calendar date. In addition, the octon subseries repeats 1/5 of that or every 3.8 years (1387.94 days). All eclipses in this table occur at the Moon's ascending node.

25 eclipse events between February 12, 1812 and September 18, 1895
February 11–12	November 30–December 1	September 17–19	July 7–8	April 25–26
108	110	112	114	116
February 12, 1812		September 19, 1819	July 8, 1823	April 26, 1827
118	120	122	124	126
February 12, 1831	November 30, 1834	September 18, 1838	July 8, 1842	April 25, 1846
128	130	132	134	136
February 12, 1850	November 30, 1853	September 18, 1857	July 8, 1861	April 25, 1865
138	140	142	144	146
February 11, 1869	November 30, 1872	September 17, 1876	July 7, 1880	April 25, 1884
148	150	152		
February 11, 1888	December 1, 1891	September 18, 1895		

=== Tritos series ===
This eclipse is a part of a tritos cycle, repeating at alternating nodes every 135 synodic months (≈ 3986.63 days, or 11 years minus 1 month). Their appearance and longitude are irregular due to a lack of synchronization with the anomalistic month (period of perigee), but groupings of 3 tritos cycles (≈ 33 years minus 3 months) come close (≈ 434.044 anomalistic months), so eclipses are similar in these groupings.

Series members between 1801 and 2200
April 4, 1810 (Saros 126)	March 4, 1821 (Saros 127)	February 1, 1832 (Saros 128)	December 31, 1842 (Saros 129)	November 30, 1853 (Saros 130)
October 30, 1864 (Saros 131)	September 29, 1875 (Saros 132)	August 29, 1886 (Saros 133)	July 29, 1897 (Saros 134)	June 28, 1908 (Saros 135)
May 29, 1919 (Saros 136)	April 28, 1930 (Saros 137)	March 27, 1941 (Saros 138)	February 25, 1952 (Saros 139)	January 25, 1963 (Saros 140)
December 24, 1973 (Saros 141)	November 22, 1984 (Saros 142)	October 24, 1995 (Saros 143)	September 22, 2006 (Saros 144)	August 21, 2017 (Saros 145)
July 22, 2028 (Saros 146)	June 21, 2039 (Saros 147)	May 20, 2050 (Saros 148)	April 20, 2061 (Saros 149)	March 19, 2072 (Saros 150)
February 16, 2083 (Saros 151)	January 16, 2094 (Saros 152)	December 17, 2104 (Saros 153)	November 16, 2115 (Saros 154)	October 16, 2126 (Saros 155)
September 15, 2137 (Saros 156)	August 14, 2148 (Saros 157)	July 15, 2159 (Saros 158)	June 14, 2170 (Saros 159)	May 13, 2181 (Saros 160)
April 12, 2192 (Saros 161)

=== Inex series ===
This eclipse is a part of the long period inex cycle, repeating at alternating nodes, every 358 synodic months (≈ 10,571.95 days, or 29 years minus 20 days). Their appearance and longitude are irregular due to a lack of synchronization with the anomalistic month (period of perigee). However, groupings of 3 inex cycles (≈ 87 years minus 2 months) comes close (≈ 1,151.02 anomalistic months), so eclipses are similar in these groupings.

Series members between 1801 and 2200
December 20, 1824 (Saros 129)	November 30, 1853 (Saros 130)	November 10, 1882 (Saros 131)
October 22, 1911 (Saros 132)	October 1, 1940 (Saros 133)	September 11, 1969 (Saros 134)
August 22, 1998 (Saros 135)	August 2, 2027 (Saros 136)	July 12, 2056 (Saros 137)
June 22, 2085 (Saros 138)	June 3, 2114 (Saros 139)	May 14, 2143 (Saros 140)
April 23, 2172 (Saros 141)		
