= February 1989 lunar eclipse =

Total lunar eclipse February 20, 1989

- Total eclipse
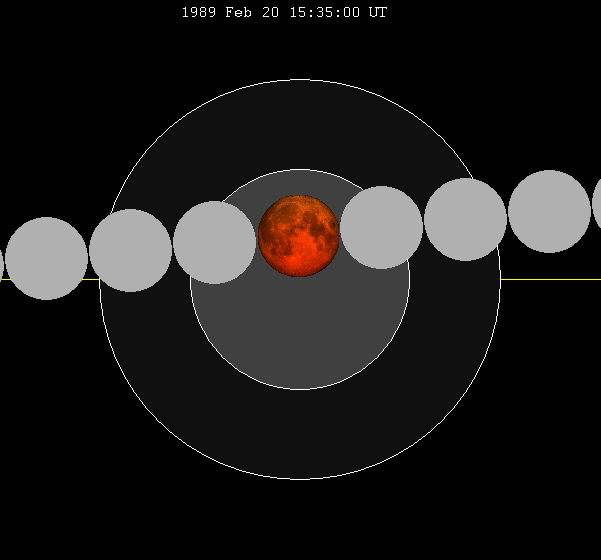
- The Moon's hourly motion shown right to left
- Date: February 20, 1989
- Gamma: 0.2935
- Magnitude: 1.2747
- Saros cycle: 123 (51 of 73)
- Totality: 78 minutes, 31 seconds
- Partiality: 223 minutes, 7 seconds
- Penumbral: 367 minutes, 40 seconds
Contacts (UTC)
- P1: 12:31:33
- U1: 13:43:47
- U2: 14:56:06
- Greatest: 15:35:22
- U3: 16:14:37
- U4: 17:26:55
- P4: 18:39:13

A total lunar eclipse occurred at the Moon’s descending node of orbit on Monday, February 20, 1989, with an umbral magnitude of 1.2747. A lunar eclipse occurs when the Moon moves into the Earth's shadow, causing the Moon to be darkened. A total lunar eclipse occurs when the Moon's near side entirely passes into the Earth's umbral shadow. Unlike a solar eclipse, which can only be viewed from a relatively small area of the world, a lunar eclipse may be viewed from anywhere on the night side of Earth. A total lunar eclipse can last up to nearly two hours, while a total solar eclipse lasts only a few minutes at any given place, because the Moon's shadow is smaller. Occurring about 3 days before apogee (on February 23, 1989, at 14:30 UTC), the Moon's apparent diameter was smaller.

== Visibility ==
The eclipse was completely visible over the eastern half of Asia and Australia, seen rising over much of Africa, Europe, and west, central, and south Asia and setting over much of North America and the eastern Pacific Ocean.

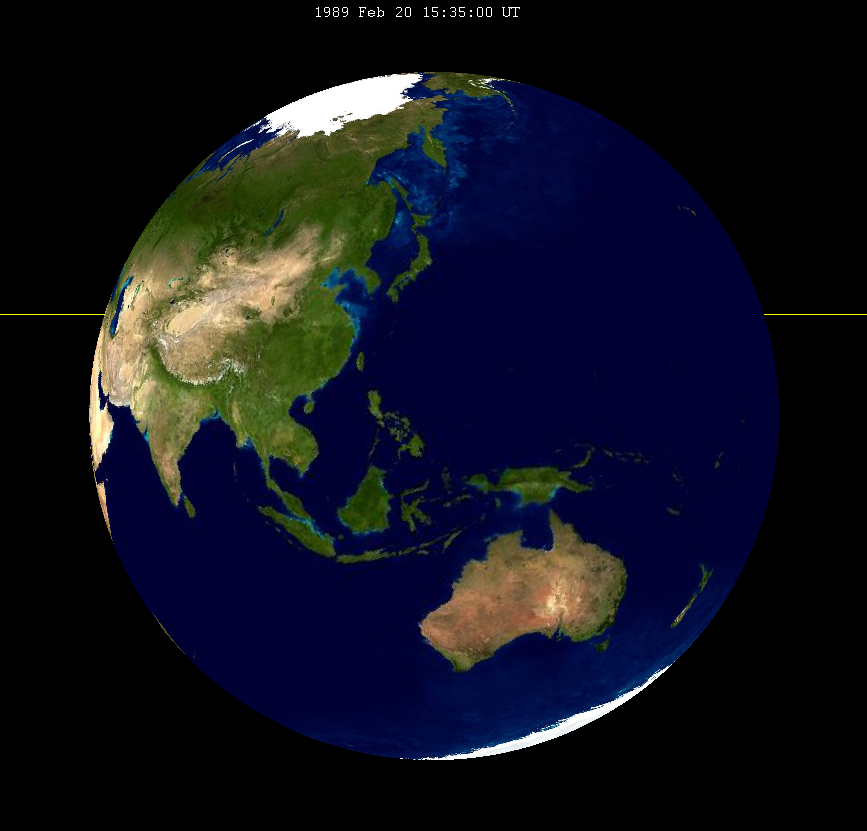
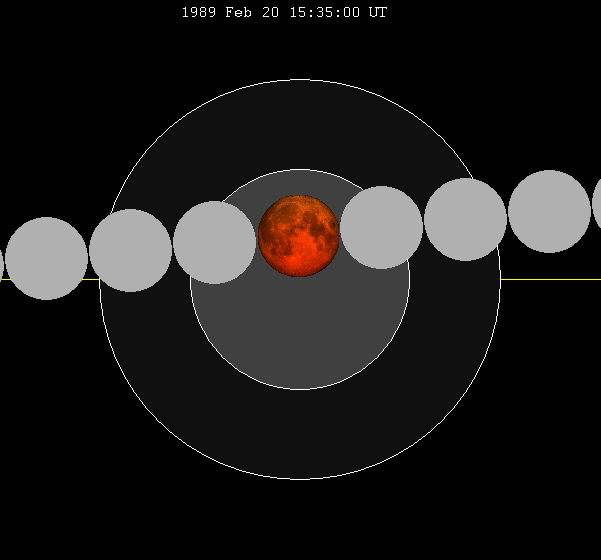

== Eclipse details ==
Shown below is a table displaying details about this particular solar eclipse. It describes various parameters pertaining to this eclipse.

February 20, 1989 Lunar Eclipse Parameters
Parameter	Value
Penumbral Magnitude	2.36514
Umbral Magnitude	1.27467
Gamma	0.29347
Sun Right Ascension	22h15m55.3s
Sun Declination	-10°46'12.9"
Sun Semi-Diameter	16'10.4"
Sun Equatorial Horizontal Parallax	08.9"
Moon Right Ascension	10h16m24.6s
Moon Declination	+11°00'28.8"
Moon Semi-Diameter	14'49.9"
Moon Equatorial Horizontal Parallax	0°54'25.9"
ΔT	56.4 s

== Eclipse season ==
This eclipse is part of an eclipse season, a period, roughly every six months, when eclipses occur. Only two (or occasionally three) eclipse seasons occur each year, and each season lasts about 35 days and repeats just short of six months (173 days) later; thus two full eclipse seasons always occur each year. Either two or three eclipses happen each eclipse season. In the sequence below, each eclipse is separated by a fortnight.

Eclipse season of February–March 1989
February 20 Descending node (full moon)	March 7 Ascending node (new moon)
Total lunar eclipse Lunar Saros 123	Partial solar eclipse Solar Saros 149

== Related eclipses ==
=== Eclipses in 1989 ===
- A total lunar eclipse on February 20.
- A partial solar eclipse on March 7.
- A total lunar eclipse on August 17.
- A partial solar eclipse on August 31.

=== Metonic ===
- Preceded by: Lunar eclipse of May 4, 1985
- Followed by: Lunar eclipse of December 9, 1992

=== Tzolkinex ===
- Preceded by: Lunar eclipse of January 9, 1982
- Followed by: Lunar eclipse of April 4, 1996

=== Half-Saros ===
- Preceded by: Solar eclipse of February 16, 1980
- Followed by: Solar eclipse of February 26, 1998

=== Tritos ===
- Preceded by: Lunar eclipse of March 24, 1978
- Followed by: Lunar eclipse of January 21, 2000

=== Lunar Saros 123 ===
- Preceded by: Lunar eclipse of February 10, 1971
- Followed by: Lunar eclipse of March 3, 2007

=== Inex ===
- Preceded by: Lunar eclipse of March 13, 1960
- Followed by: Lunar eclipse of January 31, 2018

=== Triad ===
- Preceded by: Lunar eclipse of April 22, 1902
- Followed by: Lunar eclipse of December 22, 2075

=== Lunar eclipses of 1988–1991 ===
This eclipse is a member of a semester series. An eclipse in a semester series of lunar eclipses repeats approximately every 177 days and 4 hours (a semester) at alternating nodes of the Moon's orbit.

The lunar eclipses on June 27, 1991 (penumbral) and December 21, 1991 (partial) occur in the next lunar year eclipse set.

Lunar eclipse series sets from 1988 to 1991
Descending node				Ascending node			
Saros	Date Viewing	Type Chart	Gamma	Saros	Date Viewing	Type Chart	Gamma
113	1988 Mar 03	Penumbral	0.9886	118	1988 Aug 27	Partial	−0.8682
123	1989 Feb 20	Total	0.2935	128	1989 Aug 17	Total	−0.1491
133	1990 Feb 09	Total	−0.4148	138	1990 Aug 06	Partial	0.6374
143	1991 Jan 30	Penumbral	−1.0752	148	1991 Jul 26	Penumbral	1.4370

=== Metonic series ===
This is the third of five Metonic lunar eclipses.

The Metonic cycle repeats nearly exactly every 19 years and represents a Saros cycle plus one lunar year. Because it occurs on the same calendar date, the Earth's shadow will in nearly the same location relative to the background stars.

Metonic lunar eclipse sets 1951–2027
Descending node			Ascending node		
Saros	Date	Type	Saros	Date	Type
103	1951 Feb 21.88	Penumbral	108	1951 Aug 17.13	Penumbral
113	1970 Feb 21.35	Partial	118	1970 Aug 17.14	Partial
123	1989 Feb 20.64	Total	128	1989 Aug 17.13	Total
133	2008 Feb 21.14	Total	138	2008 Aug 16.88	Partial
143	2027 Feb 20.96	Penumbral	148	2027 Aug 17.30	Penumbral

=== Saros 123 ===
This eclipse is a part of Saros series 123, repeating every 18 years, 11 days, and containing 72 events. The series started with a penumbral lunar eclipse on August 16, 1087. It contains partial eclipses from May 2, 1520 through July 6, 1610; total eclipses from July 16, 1628 through April 4, 2061; and a second set of partial eclipses from April 16, 2079 through July 2, 2205. The series ends at member 72 as a penumbral eclipse on October 8, 2367.

The longest duration of totality was produced by member 37 at 105 minutes, 58 seconds on September 20, 1736. All eclipses in this series occur at the Moon’s descending node of orbit.

Greatest	First			
The greatest eclipse of the series occurred on 1736 Sep 20, lasting 105 minutes, 58 seconds.	Penumbral	Partial	Total	Central
The greatest eclipse of the series occurred on 1736 Sep 20, lasting 105 minutes, 58 seconds.	1087 Aug 16	1520 May 02	1628 Jul 16	1682 Aug 18
The greatest eclipse of the series occurred on 1736 Sep 20, lasting 105 minutes, 58 seconds.	Last			
The greatest eclipse of the series occurred on 1736 Sep 20, lasting 105 minutes, 58 seconds.	Central	Total	Partial	Penumbral
The greatest eclipse of the series occurred on 1736 Sep 20, lasting 105 minutes, 58 seconds.	1953 Jan 29	2061 Apr 04	2205 Jul 02	2367 Oct 08

Eclipses are tabulated in three columns; every third eclipse in the same column is one exeligmos apart, so they all cast shadows over approximately the same parts of the Earth.

Series members 41–62 occur between 1801 and 2200:
41	42	43
1808 Nov 03	1826 Nov 14	1844 Nov 24
44	45	46
1862 Dec 06	1880 Dec 16	1898 Dec 27
47	48	49
1917 Jan 08	1935 Jan 19	1953 Jan 29
50	51	52
1971 Feb 10	1989 Feb 20	2007 Mar 03
53	54	55
2025 Mar 14	2043 Mar 25	2061 Apr 04
56	57	58
2079 Apr 16	2097 Apr 26	2115 May 08
59	60	61
2133 May 19	2151 May 30	2169 Jun 09
62
2187 Jun 20

=== Tritos series ===
This eclipse is a part of a tritos cycle, repeating at alternating nodes every 135 synodic months (≈ 3986.63 days, or 11 years minus 1 month). Their appearance and longitude are irregular due to a lack of synchronization with the anomalistic month (period of perigee), but groupings of 3 tritos cycles (≈ 33 years minus 3 months) come close (≈ 434.044 anomalistic months), so eclipses are similar in these groupings.

Series members between 1801 and 2200
1803 Aug 03 (Saros 106)	1814 Jul 02 (Saros 107)	1825 Jun 01 (Saros 108)	1836 May 01 (Saros 109)	1847 Mar 31 (Saros 110)
1858 Feb 27 (Saros 111)	1869 Jan 28 (Saros 112)	1879 Dec 28 (Saros 113)	1890 Nov 26 (Saros 114)	1901 Oct 27 (Saros 115)
1912 Sep 26 (Saros 116)	1923 Aug 26 (Saros 117)	1934 Jul 26 (Saros 118)	1945 Jun 25 (Saros 119)	1956 May 24 (Saros 120)
1967 Apr 24 (Saros 121)	1978 Mar 24 (Saros 122)	1989 Feb 20 (Saros 123)	2000 Jan 21 (Saros 124)	2010 Dec 21 (Saros 125)
2021 Nov 19 (Saros 126)	2032 Oct 18 (Saros 127)	2043 Sep 19 (Saros 128)	2054 Aug 18 (Saros 129)	2065 Jul 17 (Saros 130)
2076 Jun 17 (Saros 131)	2087 May 17 (Saros 132)	2098 Apr 15 (Saros 133)	2109 Mar 17 (Saros 134)	2120 Feb 14 (Saros 135)
2131 Jan 13 (Saros 136)	2141 Dec 13 (Saros 137)	2152 Nov 12 (Saros 138)	2163 Oct 12 (Saros 139)	2174 Sep 11 (Saros 140)
2185 Aug 11 (Saros 141)	2196 Jul 10 (Saros 142)			

=== Inex series ===
This eclipse is a part of the long period inex cycle, repeating at alternating nodes, every 358 synodic months (≈ 10,571.95 days, or 29 years minus 20 days). Their appearance and longitude are irregular due to a lack of synchronization with the anomalistic month (period of perigee). However, groupings of 3 inex cycles (≈ 87 years minus 2 months) comes close (≈ 1,151.02 anomalistic months), so eclipses are similar in these groupings.

Series members between 1801 and 2200
1815 Jun 21 (Saros 117)	1844 May 31 (Saros 118)	1873 May 12 (Saros 119)
1902 Apr 22 (Saros 120)	1931 Apr 02 (Saros 121)	1960 Mar 13 (Saros 122)
1989 Feb 20 (Saros 123)	2018 Jan 31 (Saros 124)	2047 Jan 12 (Saros 125)
2075 Dec 22 (Saros 126)	2104 Dec 02 (Saros 127)	2133 Nov 12 (Saros 128)
2162 Oct 23 (Saros 129)	2191 Oct 02 (Saros 130)	

=== Half-Saros cycle ===
A lunar eclipse will be preceded and followed by solar eclipses by 9 years and 5.5 days (a half saros). This lunar eclipse is related to two total solar eclipses of Solar Saros 130.

February 16, 1980	February 26, 1998

== See also ==
- List of lunar eclipses
- List of 20th-century lunar eclipses
