= Solar Saros 130 =

Saros cycle series 130 for solar eclipses

Animated path of entire Saros.

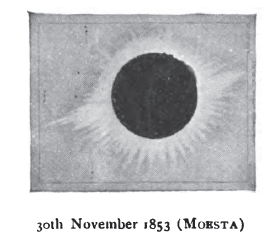
November 30, 1853 Series member 43

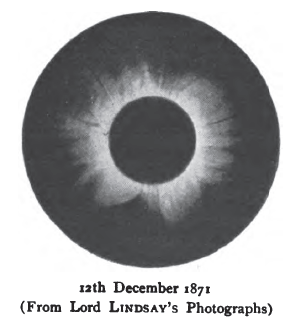
December 12, 1871 Series member 44

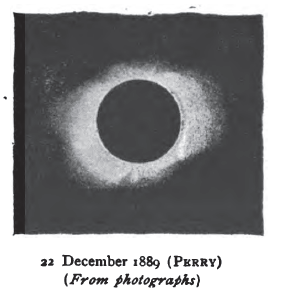
December 22, 1889 Series member 45

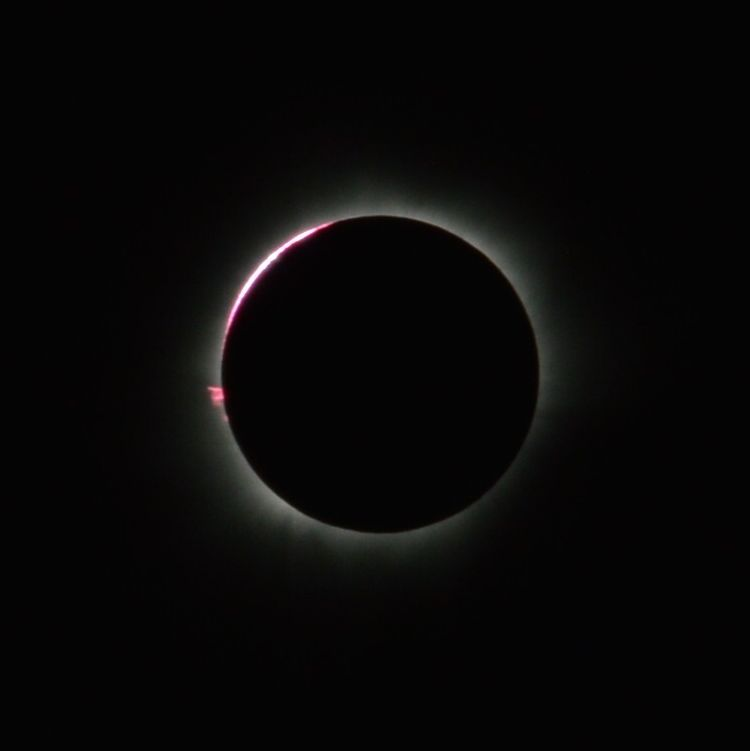
March 9, 2016 Series member 52

Saros cycle series 130 for solar eclipses occurs at the Moon's descending node, repeating every 18 years, 11 days, containing 73 eclipses, 43 of which are umbral (all total). The first eclipse in the series was on 20 August 1096 and the last eclipse will be on 25 October 2394. The most recent eclipse was a total eclipse on 9 March 2016 and the next will be a total eclipse on 20 March 2034.

The longest totality was 6 minutes 41 seconds on 11 July 1619.

This solar saros is linked to Lunar Saros 123.

== Umbral eclipses ==
Umbral eclipses (annular, total and hybrid) can be further classified as either: 1) Central (two limits), 2) Central (one limit) or 3) Non-Central (one limit). The statistical distribution of these classes in Saros series 130 appears in the following table.

Classification	Number	Percent
All Umbral eclipses	43	100.00%
Central (two limits)	43	100.00%
Central (one limit)	0	0.00%
Non-central (one limit)	0	0.00%

== All eclipses ==
Note: Dates are given in the Julian calendar prior to 15 October 1582, and in the Gregorian calendar after that.

Saros	Member	Date	Time (Greatest) UTC	Type	Location Lat, Long	Gamma	Mag.	Width (km)	Duration (min:sec)	Ref
130	1	August 20, 1096	18:35:35	Partial	61.4S 164.7W	-1.511	0.0743			
130	2	September 1, 1114	1:57:49	Partial	61.1S 75.7E	-1.4527	0.1773			
130	3	September 11, 1132	9:29:13	Partial	60.9S 46.1W	-1.4007	0.2695			
130	4	September 22, 1150	17:12:01	Partial	60.9S 170.7W	-1.3568	0.3471			
130	5	October 3, 1168	1:04:24	Partial	61.1S 62.2E	-1.3197	0.4129			
130	6	October 14, 1186	9:06:01	Partial	61.4S 67.1W	-1.2891	0.467			
130	7	October 24, 1204	17:16:40	Partial	61.9S 161.2E	-1.265	0.5097			
130	8	November 5, 1222	1:35:45	Partial	62.5S 27.2E	-1.2474	0.5408			
130	9	November 15, 1240	10:01:04	Partial	63.3S 108.5W	-1.2339	0.5649			
130	10	November 26, 1258	18:31:26	Partial	64.2S 114.3E	-1.2239	0.5826			
130	11	December 7, 1276	3:05:28	Partial	65.2S 24.2W	-1.2165	0.596			
130	12	December 18, 1294	11:42:14	Partial	66.3S 163.8W	-1.2108	0.6064			
130	13	December 28, 1312	20:17:58	Partial	67.4S 56.4E	-1.2038	0.6192			
130	14	January 9, 1331	4:53:22	Partial	68.4S 83.8W	-1.1961	0.6333			
130	15	January 19, 1349	13:24:42	Partial	69.5S 136.3E	-1.1847	0.6546			
130	16	January 30, 1367	21:53:13	Partial	70.4S 3.5W	-1.1704	0.6812			
130	17	February 10, 1385	6:14:26	Partial	71.1S 142.1W	-1.1498	0.7198			
130	18	February 21, 1403	14:31:42	Partial	71.7S 79.8E	-1.1253	0.766			
130	19	March 3, 1421	22:40:34	Partial	72S 56.6W	-1.0933	0.8265			
130	20	March 15, 1439	6:43:34	Partial	72.1S 168.3E	-1.0559	0.898			
130	21	March 25, 1457	14:38:16	Partial	71.9S 35.4E	-1.0107	0.9845			
130	22	April 5, 1475	22:27:42	Total	60.5S 123.6W	-0.9607	1.031	386	2m 8s	
130	23	April 16, 1493	6:10:20	Total	49.5S 107.3E	-0.9042	1.0391	308	3m 0s	
130	24	April 27, 1511	13:47:24	Total	40S 14.7W	-0.8425	1.0463	286	3m 50s	
130	25	May 7, 1529	21:19:50	Total	31.3S 133.1W	-0.776	1.0526	276	4m 38s	
130	26	May 19, 1547	4:48:58	Total	23.5S 110.7E	-0.706	1.0581	270	5m 22s	
130	27	May 29, 1565	12:15:00	Total	16.5S 3.7W	-0.6329	1.0629	266	5m 57s	
130	28	June 19, 1583	19:39:32	Total	10.4S 116.9W	-0.5581	1.0667	262	6m 23s	
130	29	June 30, 1601	3:03:59	Total	5.3S 130.7E	-0.4826	1.0697	259	6m 37s	
130	30	July 11, 1619	10:29:59	Total	1.3S 18.6E	-0.4077	1.0718	255	6m 41s	
130	31	July 21, 1637	17:57:08	Total	1.8N 93.4W	-0.3335	1.0731	251	6m 37s	
130	32	August 2, 1655	1:28:36	Total	3.7N 154E	-0.2625	1.0735	247	6m 28s	
130	33	August 12, 1673	9:04:05	Total	4.6N 40.6E	-0.1946	1.0731	242	6m 15s	
130	34	August 23, 1691	16:45:57	Total	4.5N 74.3W	-0.1317	1.072	236	6m 1s	
130	35	September 4, 1709	0:32:26	Total	3.7N 169.7E	-0.0725	1.0703	229	5m 47s	
130	36	September 15, 1727	8:27:31	Total	2.2N 51.4E	-0.0202	1.0681	222	5m 33s	
130	37	September 25, 1745	16:28:56	Total	0.3N 68.6W	0.0269	1.0655	214	5m 21s	
130	38	October 7, 1763	0:39:04	Total	2S 169.1E	0.0666	1.0627	206	5m 9s	
130	39	October 17, 1781	8:55:59	Total	4.3S 45.1E	0.1007	1.0596	197	4m 59s	
130	40	October 28, 1799	17:21:46	Total	6.7S 81.3W	0.1274	1.0566	188	4m 50s	
130	41	November 9, 1817	1:53:53	Total	8.9S 150.9E	0.1487	1.0536	179	4m 42s	
130	42	November 20, 1835	10:31:58	Total	10.7S 21.6E	0.1649	1.051	171	4m 35s	
130	43	November 30, 1853	19:15:39	Total	12S 109W	0.1763	1.0485	164	4m 28s	
130	44	December 12, 1871	4:03:38	Total	12.7S 119.4E	0.1836	1.0465	157	4m 23s	
130	45	December 22, 1889	12:54:15	Total	12.7S 12.8W	0.1888	1.0449	152	4m 18s	
130	46	January 3, 1908	21:45:22	Total	11.8S 145.1W	0.1934	1.0437	149	4m 14s	
130	47	January 14, 1926	6:36:58	Total	10.1S 82.3E	0.1973	1.043	147	4m 11s	
130	48	January 25, 1944	15:26:42	Total	7.6S 50.2W	0.2025	1.0428	146	4m 9s	
130	49	February 5, 1962	0:12:38	Total	4.2S 178.1E	0.2107	1.043	147	4m 8s	
130	50	February 16, 1980	8:54:01	Total	0.1S 47.1E	0.2224	1.0434	149	4m 8s	
130	51	February 26, 1998	17:29:27	Total	4.7N 82.7W	0.2391	1.0441	151	4m 9s	
130	52	March 9, 2016	1:58:19	Total	10.1N 148.8E	0.2609	1.045	155	4m 9s	
130	53	March 20, 2034	10:18:45	Total	16.1N 22.2E	0.2894	1.0458	159	4m 9s	
130	54	March 30, 2052	18:31:53	Total	22.4N 102.5W	0.3238	1.0466	164	4m 8s	
130	55	April 11, 2070	2:36:09	Total	29.1N 135.1E	0.3652	1.0472	168	4m 4s	
130	56	April 21, 2088	10:31:49	Total	36N 15.1E	0.4135	1.0474	173	3m 58s	
130	57	May 3, 2106	18:19:20	Total	43.1N 102.3W	0.4681	1.0472	177	3m 47s	
130	58	May 14, 2124	1:59:10	Total	50.3N 143.2E	0.5286	1.0464	182	3m 34s	
130	59	May 25, 2142	9:32:37	Total	57.4N 31.9E	0.5937	1.0449	187	3m 17s	
130	60	June 4, 2160	16:58:36	Total	64.5N 74.9W	0.6645	1.0428	192	2m 58s	
130	61	June 16, 2178	0:20:42	Total	71N 175.3W	0.7378	1.0396	198	2m 36s	
130	62	June 26, 2196	7:37:40	Total	76.3N 97E	0.8149	1.0356	208	2m 12s	
130	63	July 8, 2214	14:52:45	Total	78.1N 28.3E	0.8925	1.0303	230	1m 46s	
130	64	July 18, 2232	22:04:56	Total	72.4N 33.4W	0.9717	1.0229	348	1m 14s	
130	65	July 30, 2250	5:18:25	Partial	62.9N 124.7W	1.049	0.9114			
130	66	August 9, 2268	12:32:05	Partial	62.2N 118E	1.1254	0.7684			
130	67	August 20, 2286	19:48:22	Partial	61.7N 0.2E	1.1987	0.6322			
130	68	September 1, 2304	3:07:40	Partial	61.4N 118.2W	1.2684	0.5038			
130	69	September 12, 2322	10:32:06	Partial	61.1N 122.2E	1.3328	0.3865			
130	70	September 22, 2340	18:01:34	Partial	61.1N 1.4E	1.3925	0.2793			
130	71	October 4, 2358	1:36:39	Partial	61.1N 120.7W	1.4464	0.1835			
130	72	October 14, 2376	9:18:28	Partial	61.4N 115.4E	1.4941	0.1003			
130	73	October 25, 2394	17:07:13	Partial	61.8N 10.3W	1.5351	0.0298			
