= 1956 lunar eclipse =

Two lunar eclipses occurred in 1956:

- 24 May 1956 partial lunar eclipse
- 18 November 1956 total lunar eclipse

== See also ==
- List of 20th-century lunar eclipses
- Lists of lunar eclipses
