= December 2010 lunar eclipse =

Total Lunar eclipse of 21 December 2010

- Total eclipse
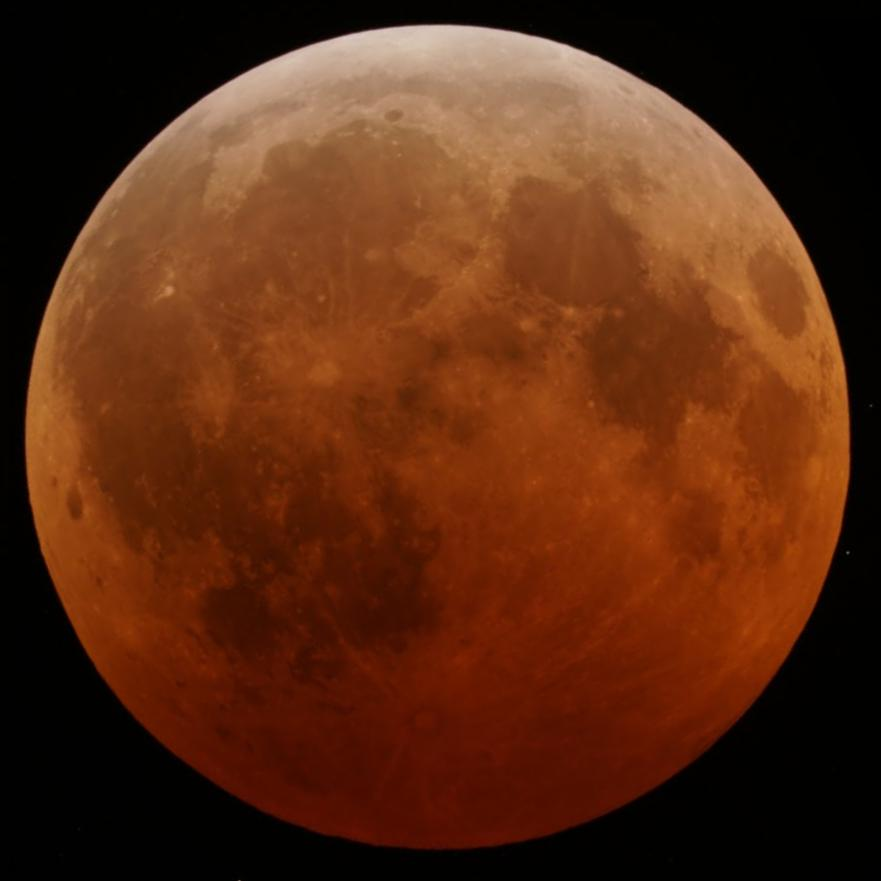
- Totality as viewed from San Jose, California, 8:11 UTC
- Date: 21 December 2010
- Gamma: 0.3213
- Magnitude: 1.2576
- Saros cycle: 125 (48 of 72)
- Totality: 72 minutes, 21 seconds
- Partiality: 208 minutes, 41 seconds
- Penumbral: 335 minutes, 7 seconds
Contacts (UTC)
- P1: 5:29:21
- U1: 6:32:38
- U2: 7:40:48
- Greatest: 8:16:57
- U3: 8:53:09
- U4: 10:01:19
- P4: 11:04:28

A total lunar eclipse occurred at the Moon’s descending node of orbit on Tuesday, 21 December 2010, with an umbral magnitude of 1.2576. A lunar eclipse occurs when the Moon moves into the Earth's shadow, causing the Moon to be darkened. A total lunar eclipse occurs when the Moon's near side entirely passes into the Earth's umbral shadow. Unlike a solar eclipse, which can only be viewed from a relatively small area of the world, a lunar eclipse may be viewed from anywhere on the night side of Earth. A total lunar eclipse can last up to nearly two hours, while a total solar eclipse lasts only a few minutes at any given place, because the Moon's shadow is smaller. Occurring about 4 days before apogee (on 25 December 2010, at 7:15 UTC), the Moon's apparent diameter was smaller.

This eclipse was notable in that it coincided with the date of the Winter solstice in the Northern Hemisphere and Summer solstice in the Southern Hemisphere. It was the first total lunar eclipse to occur on the day of the Northern Winter Solstice (Southern Summer Solstice) since 1638, and only the second in the Common Era.

== Visibility ==
The eclipse was completely visible over North America and the eastern Pacific Ocean, seen rising over east Asia and Australia and setting over South America, west Africa, and Europe.

Hourly motion shown right to left	The Moon's hourly motion across the Earth's shadow in the constellation of Taurus.
Visibility map

== Images ==
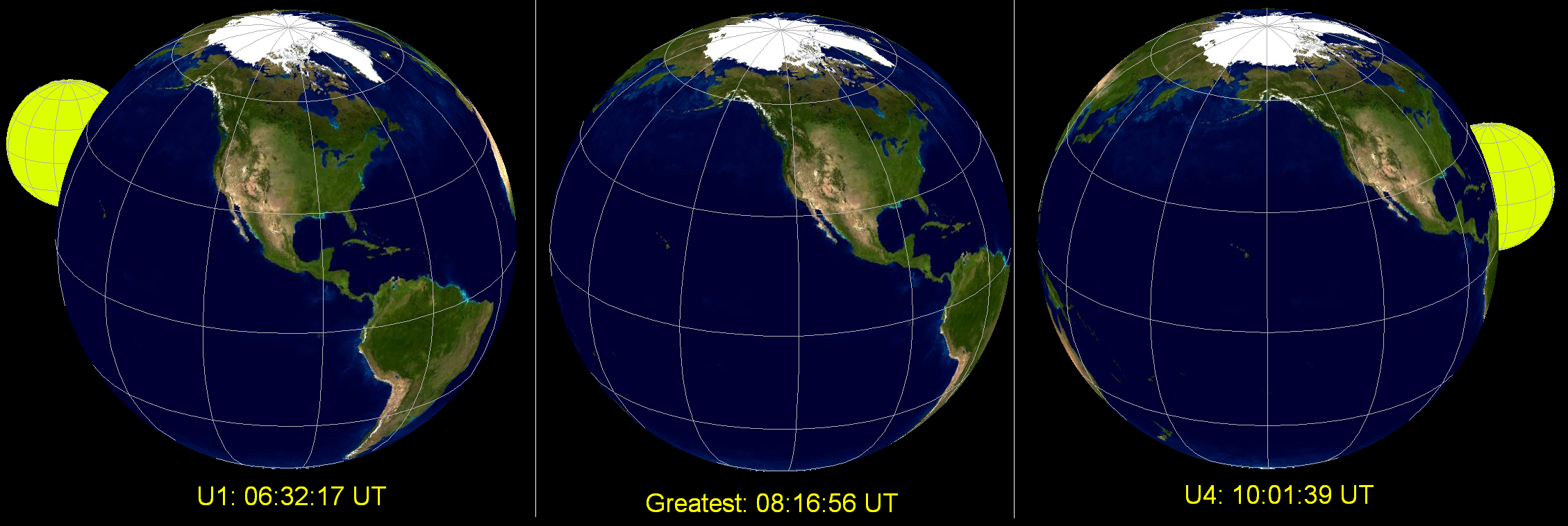
These simulated views of the Earth from the center of the Moon during the lunar eclipse show where the eclipse is visible on Earth.

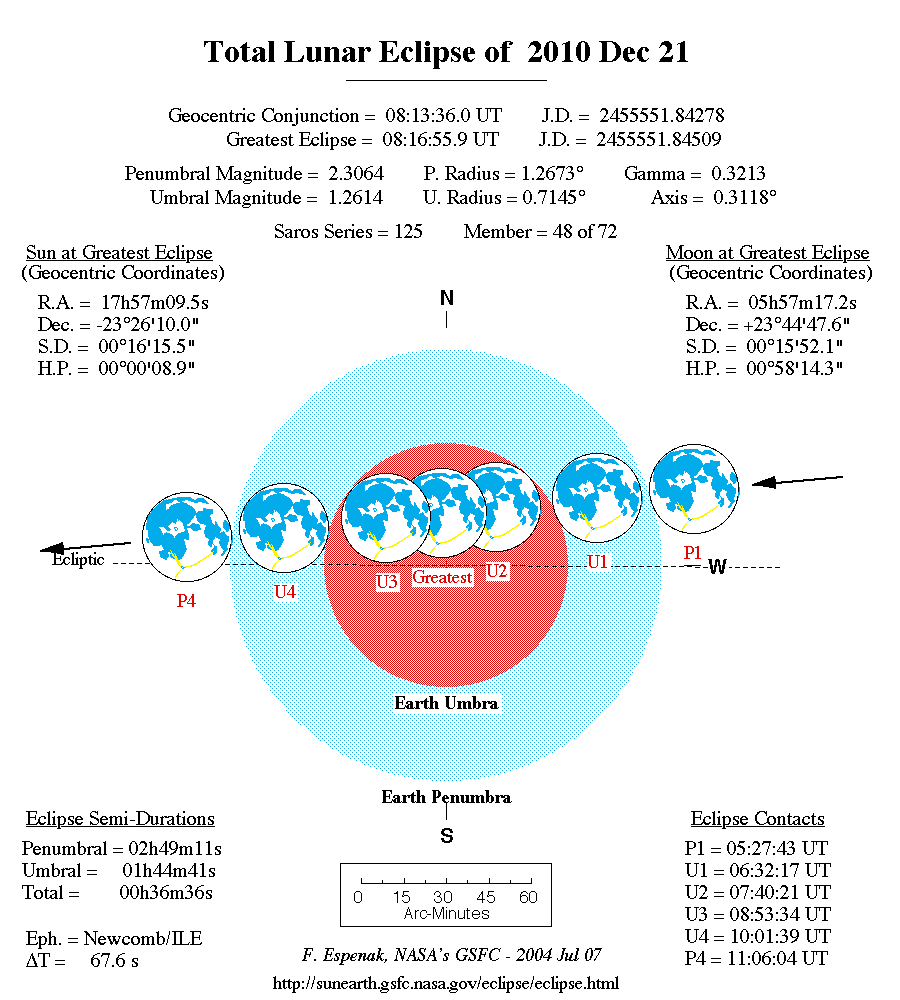
NASA chart of the eclipse

== Gallery ==
Progressions
Progression from São Paulo, Brazil
Progression from Anchorage, Alaska
Panorama showing the view from the site of the VLT
Sequence from Toronto, Ontario, Canada (Sequence is in 15-minute increments, with 5-minute increments up until totality at 8:17 am UTC)	Progression from Toronto, Canada
From Jacksonville, Florida, 8:29 UTC - 10:06 UTC	From Easton, Pennsylvania

Individual shots, sorted by time:

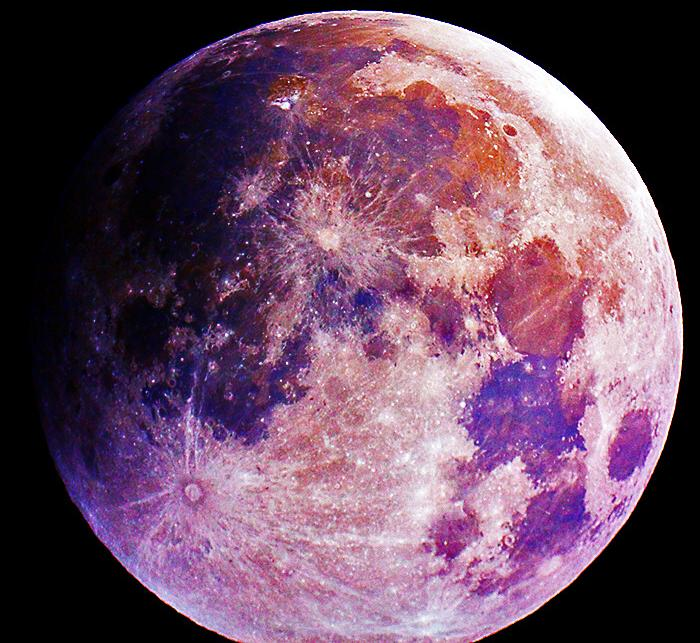
From New York City, New York, 5:35 UTC

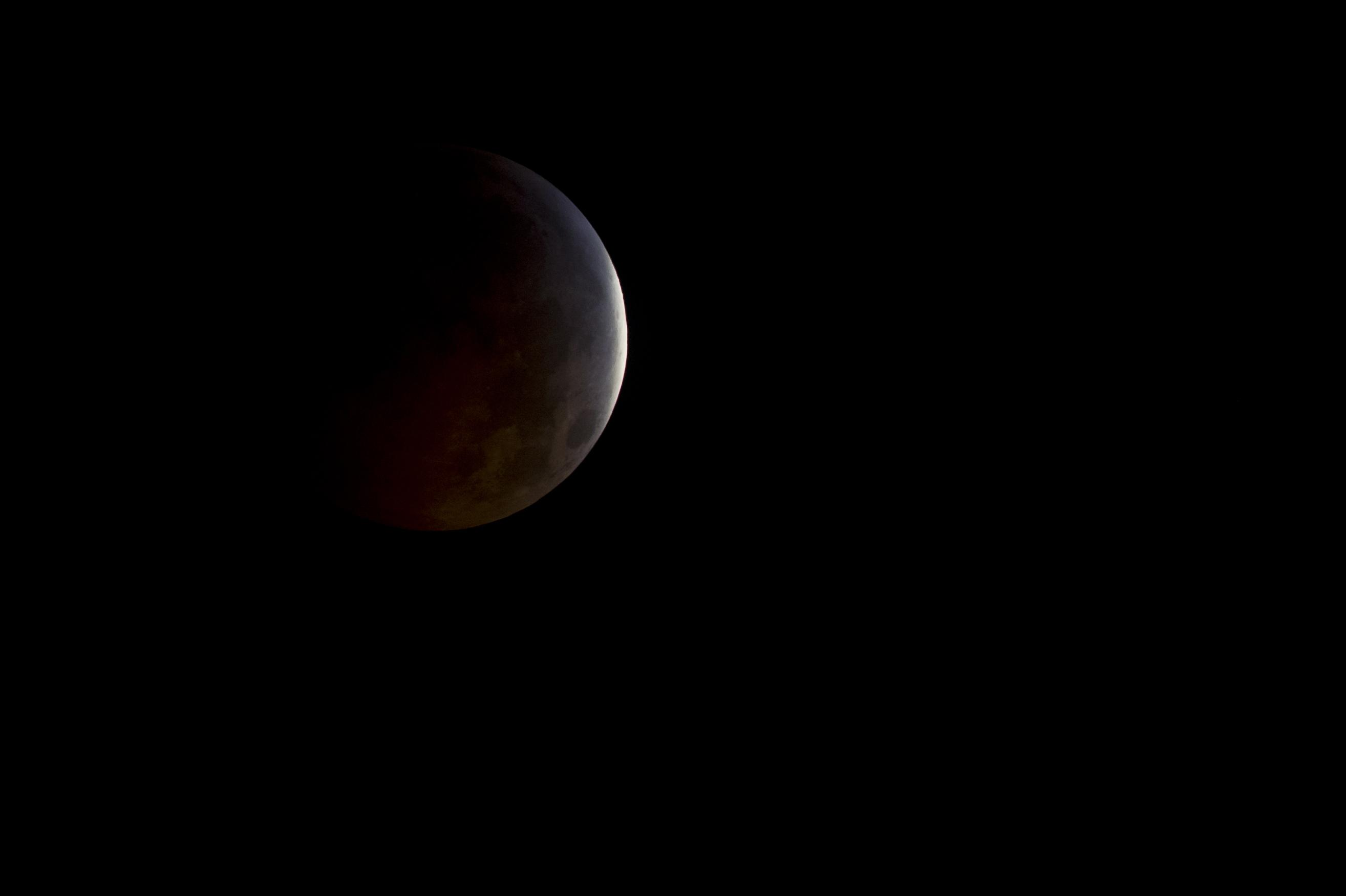
From Arlington County, Virginia, ~7:30 UTC

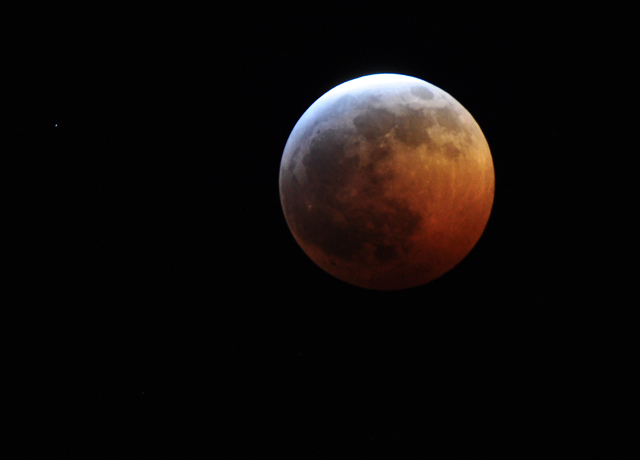
From New York City, New York, 7:38 UTC

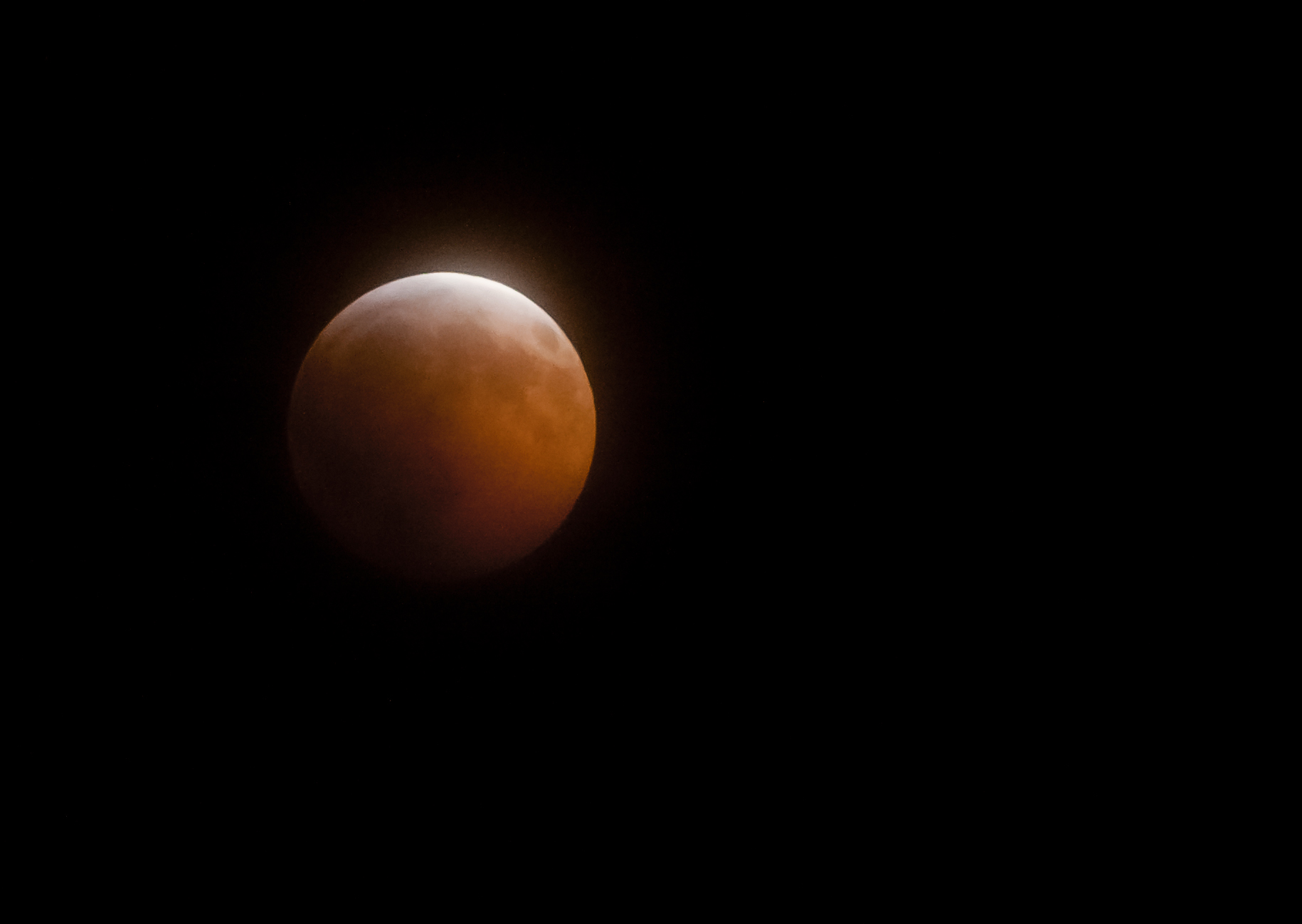
From Seattle, Washington, beginning of totality, 7:41 UTC

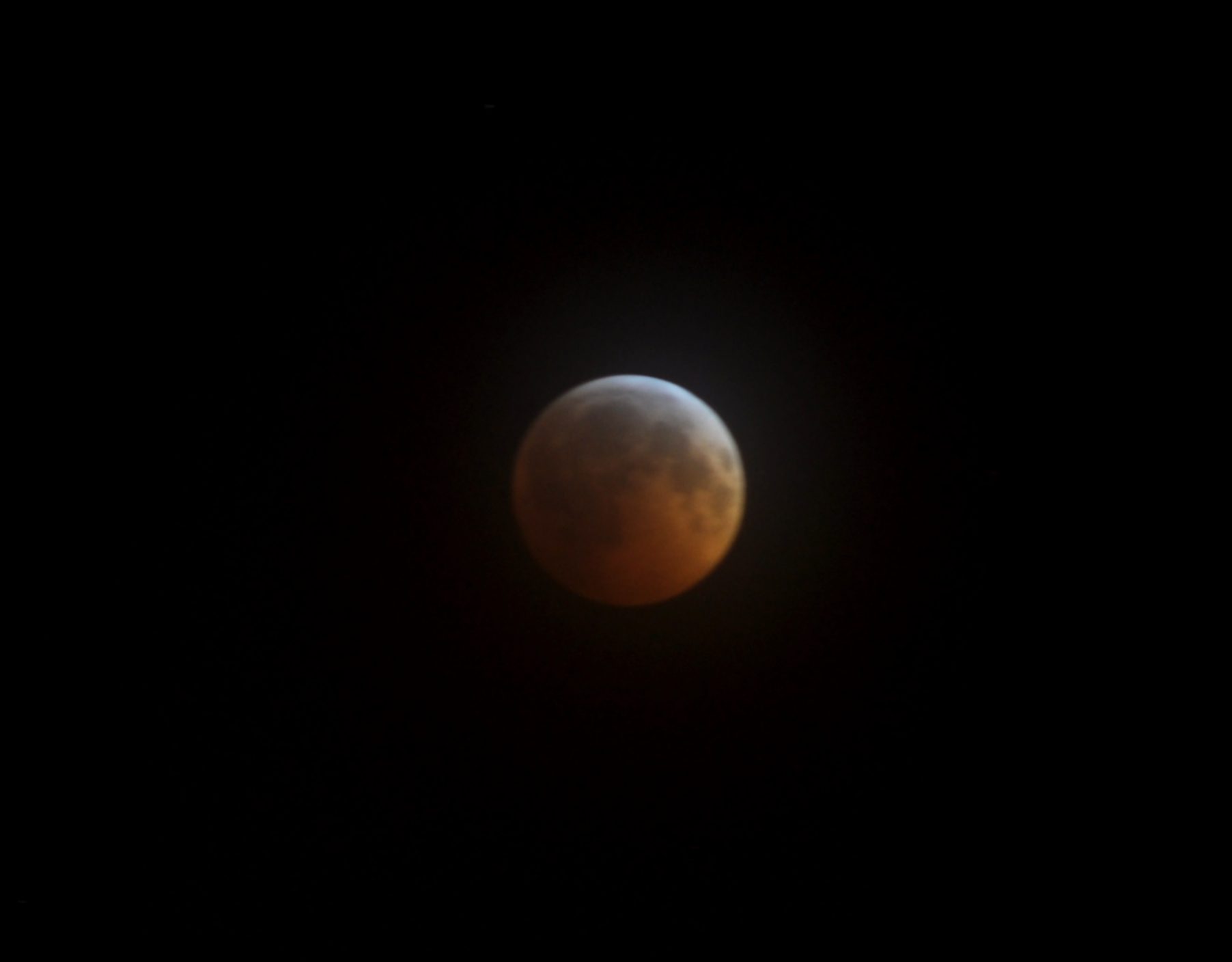
From the Lower Mainland of British Columbia, Canada, 7:46 UTC

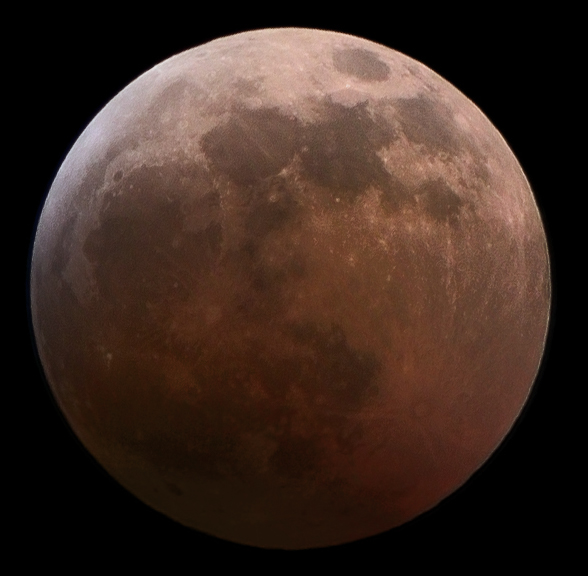
From Miami, Florida, 7:52 UTC

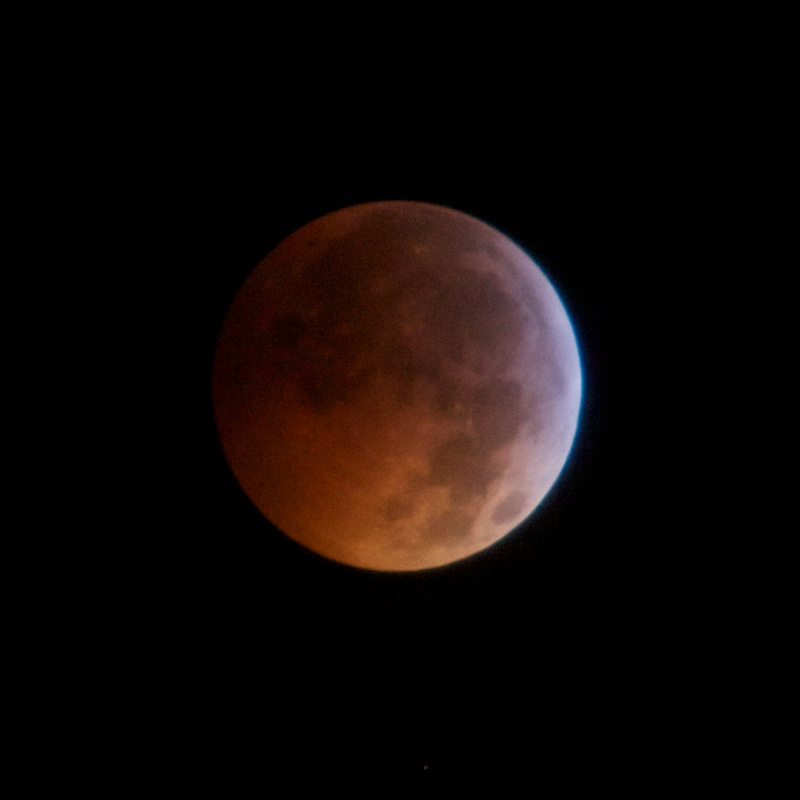
From Richardson, Texas, 7:53 UTC

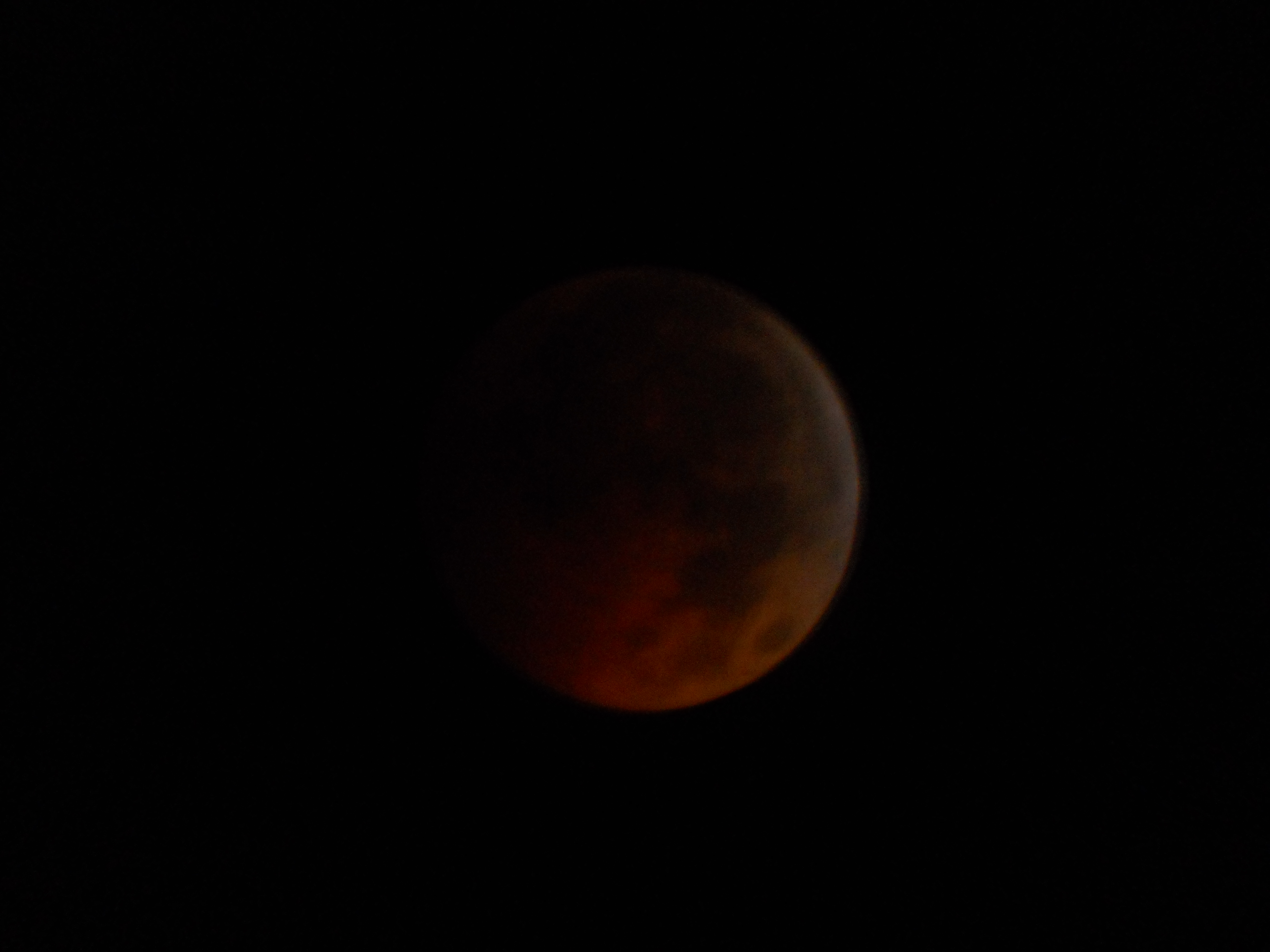
From Dover, Delaware, 7:54 UTC

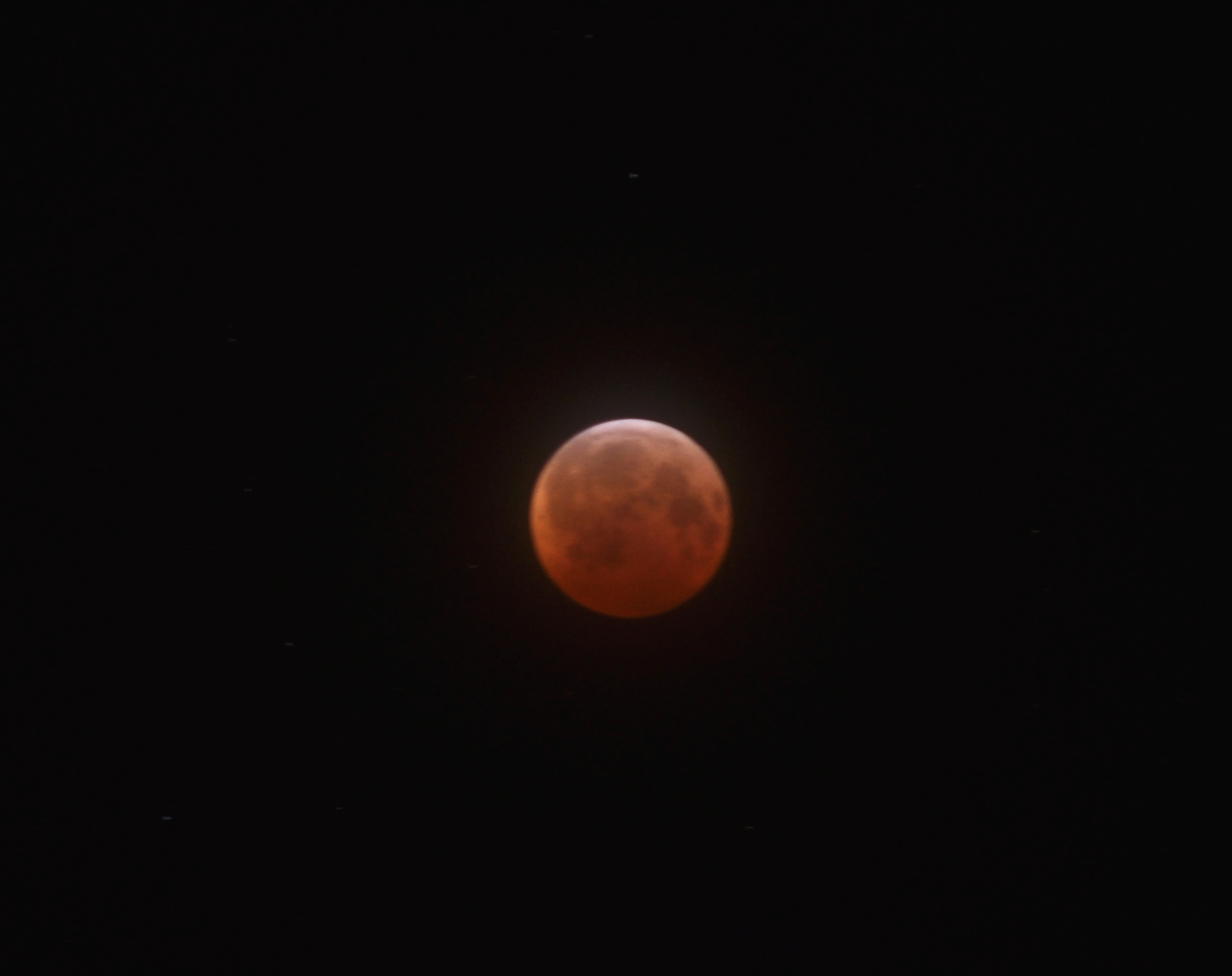
Lower Mainland of British Columbia, Canada during totality, 8:21 UTC

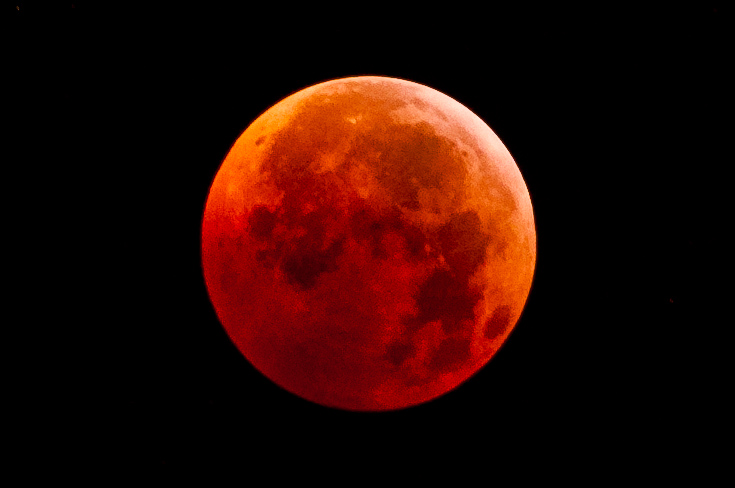
From Toronto, Ontario, Canada, 8:26 UTC

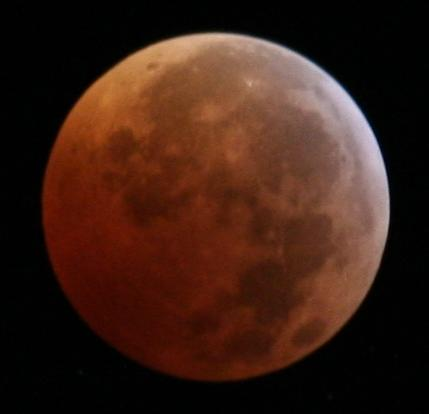
From Orlando, Florida, 8:28 UTC

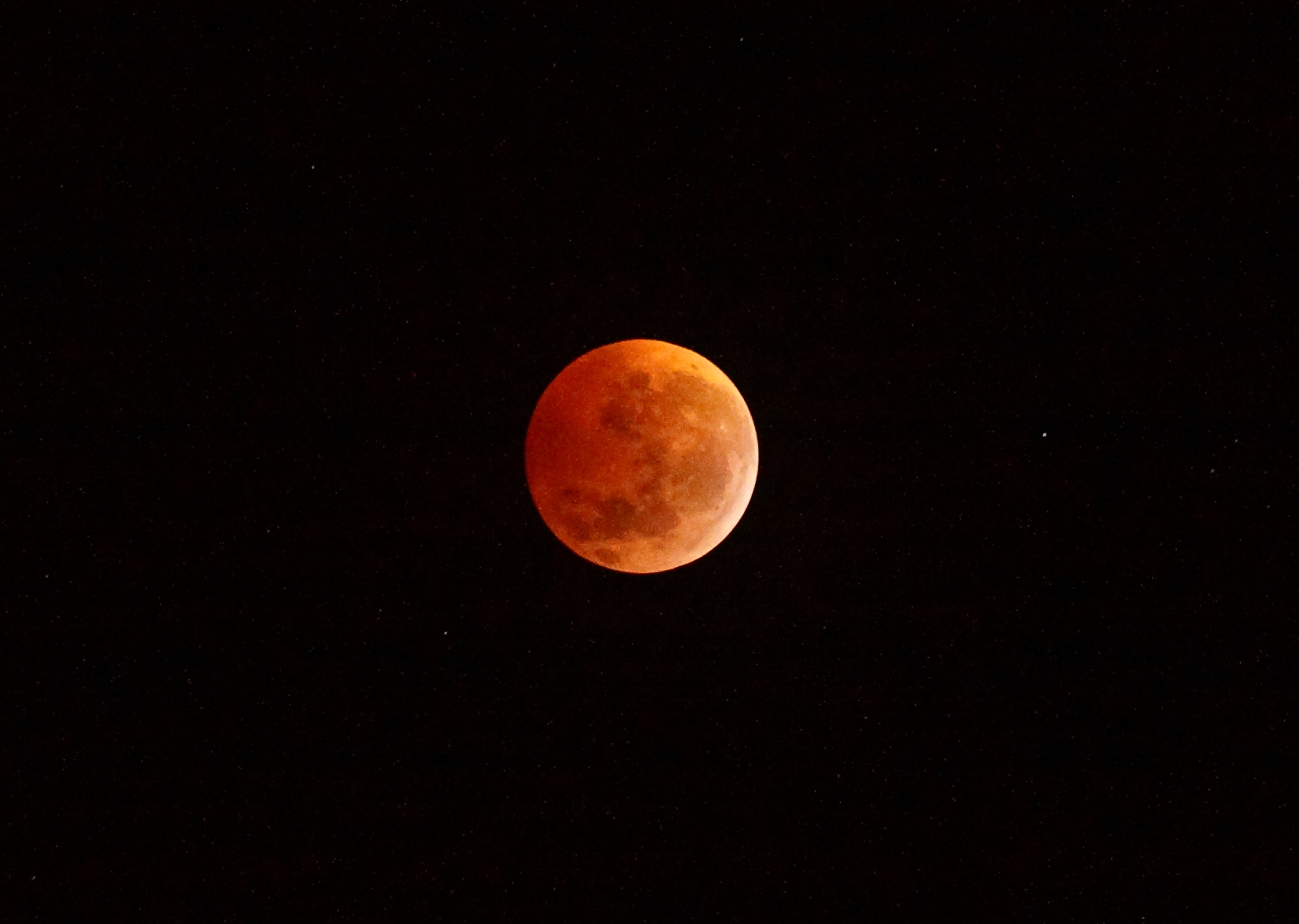
From Jacksonville, Florida, 8:30 UTC

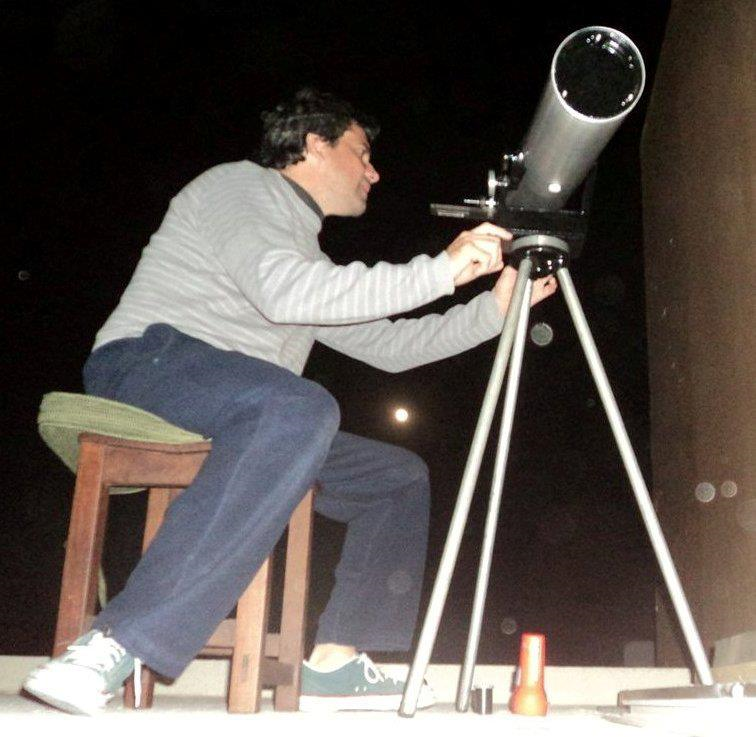
Amateur scientists observing eclipse in Villa Gesell, Argentina, 8:34 UTC

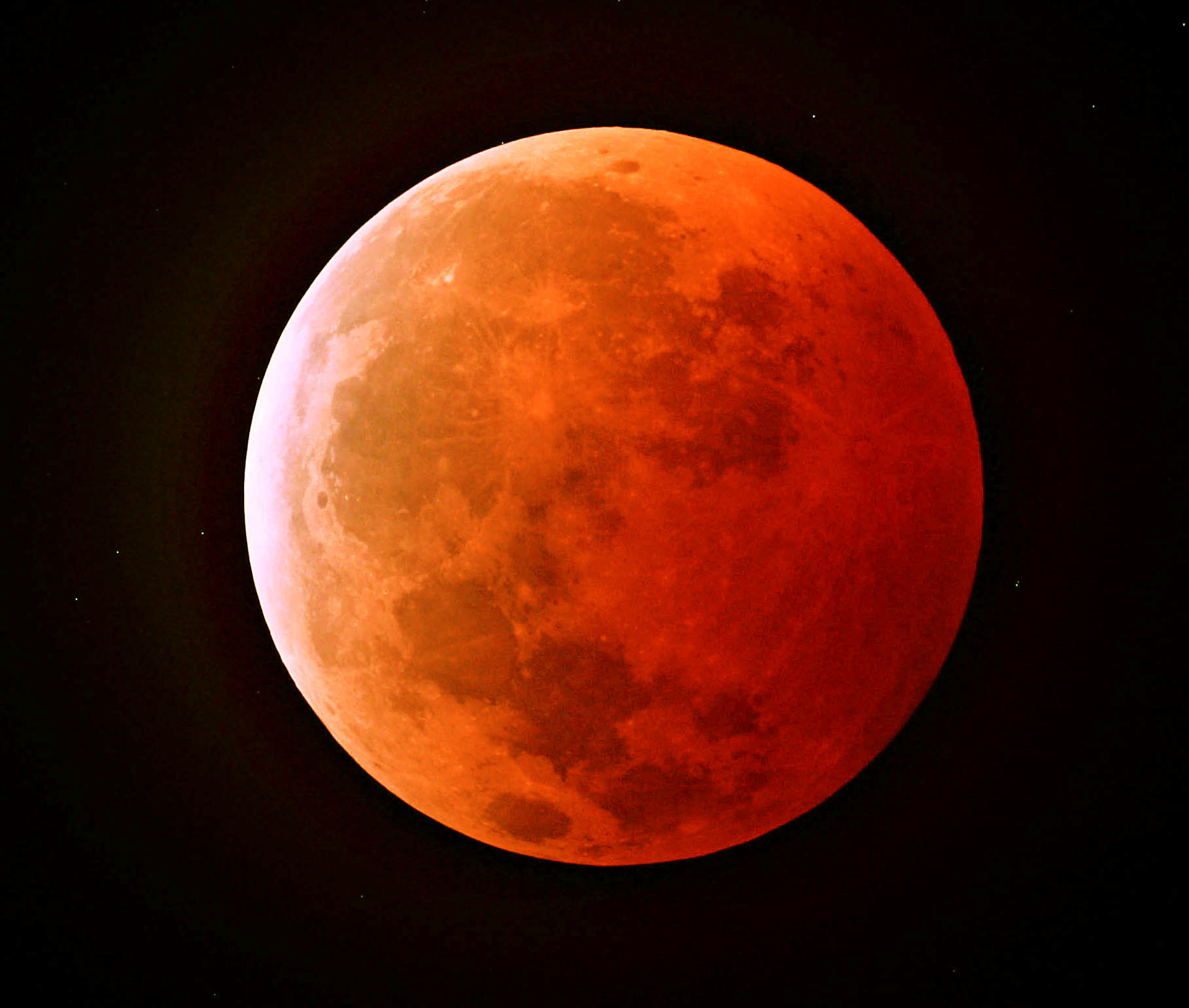
From Tucson, Arizona, 8:44 UTC

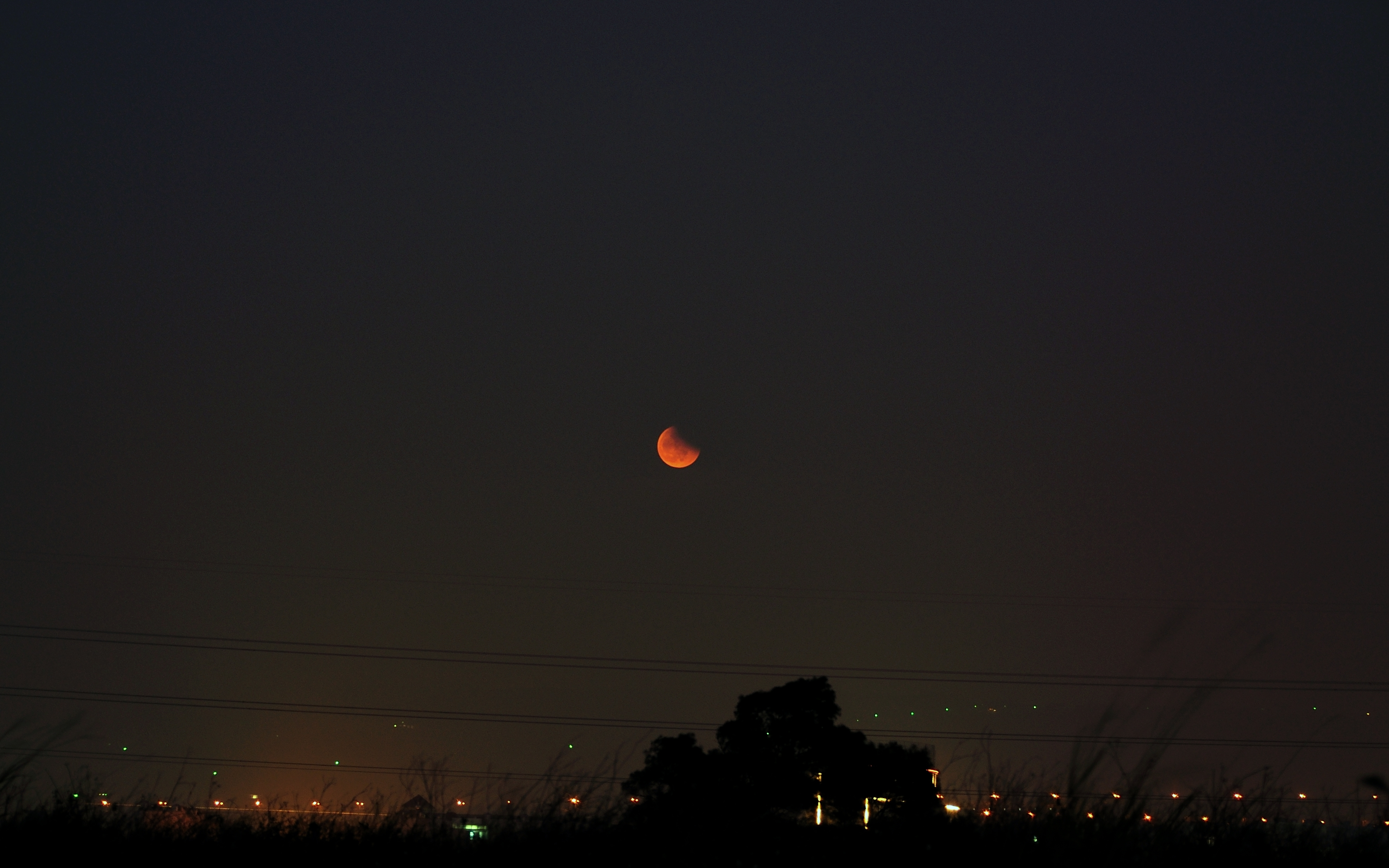
From Longjing District, Taichung, Taiwan at moonrise, 9:45 UTC

Animations:

Animated Simulation

Time-lapsed animation
Miami, Florida

== Timing ==
In North America, the eclipse was visible in its entirety on 21 December 2010, from 12:27 a.m. to 6:06 a.m. Eastern Standard Time. In the Central Standard Time zone and west, the eclipse began the night of 20 December. Observers along South America's east coast missed the late stages of the eclipse because they occurred after moon-set.

Likewise much of Europe and Africa experienced moon-set while the eclipse was in progress. In Europe, only those observers in northern Scandinavia (including Iceland), Ireland and Britain could observe the entire event. For observers in eastern Asia the moon rose in eclipse. The eclipse was not visible from southern and eastern Africa, the Middle East or South Asia. In Japan and northeastern Asia, the eclipse's end was visible, with the moon rising at sunset. In the Philippines it was observable as a partial lunar eclipse just after sunset.

Predictions suggested that the total eclipse may appear unusually orange or red, as a result of the eruption of Mount Merapi in Indonesia on 26 October.

Local times of eclipse over North America
Event	HAST (UTC-10)	AKST (UTC−9)	PST (UTC−8)	MST (UTC−7)	CST (UTC−6)	EST (UTC−5)	AST (UTC−4)	UTC (UTC)
Start penumbral (P1)	7:29 pm^{(*)}	8:29 pm^{(*)}	9:29 pm^{(*)}	10:29 pm^{(*)}	11:29 pm^{(*)}	12:29 am	1:29 am	5:29 am
Start umbral (U1)	8:33 pm^{(*)}	9:33 pm^{(*)}	10:33 pm^{(*)}	11:33 pm^{(*)}	12:33 am	1:33 am	2:33 am	6:33 am
Start total (U2)	9:41 pm^{(*)}	10:41 pm^{(*)}	11:41 pm^{(*)}	12:41 am	1:41 am	2:41 am	3:41 am	7:41 am
Greatest eclipse	10:17 pm^{(*)}	11:17 pm^{(*)}	12:17 am	1:17 am	2:17 am	3:17 am	4:17 am	8:17 am
End total (U3)	10:53 pm^{(*)}	11:53 pm^{(*)}	12:53 am	1:53 am	2:53 am	3:53 am	4:53 am	8:53 am
End umbral (U4)	12:01 am	1:01 am	2:01 am	3:01 am	4:01 am	5:01 am	6:01 am	10:01 am
End penumbral (P4)	1:04 am	2:04 am	3:04 am	4:04 am	5:04 am	6:04 am	7:04 am	11:04 am
(*) before midnight on Monday night, 20 December

== Eclipse details ==
Shown below is a table displaying details about this particular solar eclipse. It describes various parameters pertaining to this eclipse.

21 December 2010 Lunar Eclipse Parameters
Parameter	Value
Penumbral Magnitude	2.28215
Umbral Magnitude	1.25759
Gamma	0.32139
Sun Right Ascension	17h57m09.6s
Sun Declination	-23°26'09.9"
Sun Semi-Diameter	16'15.5"
Sun Equatorial Horizontal Parallax	08.9"
Moon Right Ascension	05h57m17.3s
Moon Declination	+23°44'47.8"
Moon Semi-Diameter	15'52.1"
Moon Equatorial Horizontal Parallax	0°58'14.3"
ΔT	66.4 s

== Eclipse season ==
This eclipse is part of an eclipse season, a period, roughly every six months, when eclipses occur. Only two (or occasionally three) eclipse seasons occur each year, and each season lasts about 35 days and repeats just short of six months (173 days) later; thus two full eclipse seasons always occur each year. Either two or three eclipses happen each eclipse season. In the sequence below, each eclipse is separated by a fortnight.

Eclipse season of December 2010–January 2011
21 December Descending node (full moon)	January 4 Ascending node (new moon)
Total lunar eclipse Lunar Saros 125	Partial solar eclipse Solar Saros 151

== Related eclipses ==
=== Eclipses in 2010 ===
- An annular solar eclipse on January 15.
- A partial lunar eclipse on June 26.
- A total solar eclipse on July 11.
- A total lunar eclipse on 21 December.

=== Metonic ===
- Preceded by: Lunar eclipse of March 3, 2007
- Followed by: Lunar eclipse of October 8, 2014

=== Tzolkinex ===
- Preceded by: Lunar eclipse of November 9, 2003
- Followed by: Lunar eclipse of January 31, 2018

=== Half-Saros ===
- Preceded by: Solar eclipse of December 14, 2001
- Followed by: Solar eclipse of December 26, 2019

=== Tritos ===
- Preceded by: Lunar eclipse of January 21, 2000
- Followed by: Lunar eclipse of November 19, 2021

=== Lunar Saros 125 ===
- Preceded by: Lunar eclipse of December 9, 1992
- Followed by: Lunar eclipse of December 31, 2028

=== Inex ===
- Preceded by: Lunar eclipse of January 10, 1982
- Followed by: Lunar eclipse of November 30, 2039

=== Triad ===
- Preceded by: Lunar eclipse of February 20, 1924
- Followed by: Lunar eclipse of October 21, 2097

=== Lunar eclipses of 2009–2013 ===
This eclipse is a member of a semester series. An eclipse in a semester series of lunar eclipses repeats approximately every 177 days and 4 hours (a semester) at alternating nodes of the Moon's orbit.

The penumbral lunar eclipses on February 9, 2009 and August 6, 2009 occur in the previous lunar year eclipse set, and the lunar eclipses on April 25, 2013 (partial) and October 18, 2013 (penumbral) occur in the next lunar year eclipse set.

Lunar eclipse series sets from 2009 to 2013
Ascending node				Descending node			
Saros	Date Viewing	Type Chart	Gamma	Saros	Date Viewing	Type Chart	Gamma
110	2009 Jul 07	Penumbral	−1.4916	115	2009 Dec 31	Partial	0.9766
120	2010 Jun 26	Partial	−0.7091	125	2010 Dec 21	Total	0.3214
130	2011 Jun 15	Total	0.0897	135	2011 Dec 10	Total	−0.3882
140	2012 Jun 04	Partial	0.8248	145	2012 Nov 28	Penumbral	−1.0869
150	2013 May 25	Penumbral	1.5351				

=== Metonic series ===
The Metonic cycle repeats nearly exactly every 19 years and represents a Saros cycle plus one lunar year. Because it occurs on the same calendar date, the Earth's shadow will be in nearly the same location relative to the background stars.

Ascending node	Descending node
1. 1991 Jun 27 - penumbral (110); 2. 2010 Jun 26 - partial (120); 3. 2029 Jun 26 - total (130); 4. 2048 Jun 26 - partial (140); 5. 2067 Jun 27 - penumbral (150)	1. 1991 Dec 21 - partial (115); 2. 2010 Dec 21 - total (125); 3. 2029 Dec 20 - total (135); 4. 2048 Dec 20 - partial (145)

=== Saros 125 ===
This eclipse is a part of Saros series 125, repeating every 18 years, 11 days, and containing 72 events. The series started with a penumbral lunar eclipse on July 17, 1163. It contains partial eclipses from January 17, 1470 through June 6, 1686; total eclipses from June 17, 1704 through March 19, 2155; and a second set of partial eclipses from March 29, 2173 through June 25, 2317. The series ends at member 72 as a penumbral eclipse on September 9, 2443.

The longest duration of totality was produced by member 37 at 100 minutes, 23 seconds on August 22, 1812. All eclipses in this series occur at the Moon’s descending node of orbit.

Greatest	First			
The greatest eclipse of the series occurred on 1812 Aug 22, lasting 100 minutes, 23 seconds.	Penumbral	Partial	Total	Central
The greatest eclipse of the series occurred on 1812 Aug 22, lasting 100 minutes, 23 seconds.	1163 Jul 17	1470 Jan 17	1704 Jun 17	1758 Jul 20
The greatest eclipse of the series occurred on 1812 Aug 22, lasting 100 minutes, 23 seconds.	Last			
The greatest eclipse of the series occurred on 1812 Aug 22, lasting 100 minutes, 23 seconds.	Central	Total	Partial	Penumbral
The greatest eclipse of the series occurred on 1812 Aug 22, lasting 100 minutes, 23 seconds.	1920 Oct 27	2155 Mar 19	2317 Jun 25	2443 Sep 09

Eclipses are tabulated in three columns; every third eclipse in the same column is one exeligmos apart, so they all cast shadows over approximately the same parts of the Earth.

Series members 37–58 occur between 1801 and 2200:
37	38	39
1812 Aug 22	1830 Sep 02	1848 Sep 13
40	41	42
1866 Sep 24	1884 Oct 04	1902 Oct 17
43	44	45
1920 Oct 27	1938 Nov 07	1956 Nov 18
46	47	48
1974 Nov 29	1992 Dec 09	2010 Dec 21
49	50	51
2028 Dec 31	2047 Jan 12	2065 Jan 22
52	53	54
2083 Feb 02	2101 Feb 14	2119 Feb 25
55	56	57
2137 Mar 07	2155 Mar 19	2173 Mar 29
58
2191 Apr 09

=== Tritos series ===
This eclipse is a part of a tritos cycle, repeating at alternating nodes every 135 synodic months (≈ 3986.63 days, or 11 years minus 1 month). Their appearance and longitude are irregular due to a lack of synchronization with the anomalistic month (period of perigee), but groupings of 3 tritos cycles (≈ 33 years minus 3 months) come close (≈ 434.044 anomalistic months), so eclipses are similar in these groupings.

Series members between 1801 and 2200
1803 Aug 03 (Saros 106)	1814 Jul 02 (Saros 107)	1825 Jun 01 (Saros 108)	1836 May 01 (Saros 109)	1847 Mar 31 (Saros 110)
1858 Feb 27 (Saros 111)	1869 Jan 28 (Saros 112)	1879 Dec 28 (Saros 113)	1890 Nov 26 (Saros 114)	1901 Oct 27 (Saros 115)
1912 Sep 26 (Saros 116)	1923 Aug 26 (Saros 117)	1934 Jul 26 (Saros 118)	1945 Jun 25 (Saros 119)	1956 May 24 (Saros 120)
1967 Apr 24 (Saros 121)	1978 Mar 24 (Saros 122)	1989 Feb 20 (Saros 123)	2000 Jan 21 (Saros 124)	2010 Dec 21 (Saros 125)
2021 Nov 19 (Saros 126)	2032 Oct 18 (Saros 127)	2043 Sep 19 (Saros 128)	2054 Aug 18 (Saros 129)	2065 Jul 17 (Saros 130)
2076 Jun 17 (Saros 131)	2087 May 17 (Saros 132)	2098 Apr 15 (Saros 133)	2109 Mar 17 (Saros 134)	2120 Feb 14 (Saros 135)
2131 Jan 13 (Saros 136)	2141 Dec 13 (Saros 137)	2152 Nov 12 (Saros 138)	2163 Oct 12 (Saros 139)	2174 Sep 11 (Saros 140)
2185 Aug 11 (Saros 141)	2196 Jul 10 (Saros 142)			

=== Inex series ===
This eclipse is a part of the long period inex cycle, repeating at alternating nodes, every 358 synodic months (≈ 10,571.95 days, or 29 years minus 20 days). Their appearance and longitude are irregular due to a lack of synchronization with the anomalistic month (period of perigee). However, groupings of 3 inex cycles (≈ 87 years minus 2 months) comes close (≈ 1,151.02 anomalistic months), so eclipses are similar in these groupings.

Series members between 1801 and 2200
1808 May 10 (Saros 118)	1837 Apr 20 (Saros 119)	1866 Mar 31 (Saros 120)
1895 Mar 11 (Saros 121)	1924 Feb 20 (Saros 122)	1953 Jan 29 (Saros 123)
1982 Jan 09 (Saros 124)	2010 Dec 21 (Saros 125)	2039 Nov 30 (Saros 126)
2068 Nov 09 (Saros 127)	2097 Oct 21 (Saros 128)	2126 Oct 01 (Saros 129)
2155 Sep 11 (Saros 130)	2184 Aug 21 (Saros 131)	

=== Half-Saros cycle ===
A lunar eclipse will be preceded and followed by solar eclipses by 9 years and 5.5 days (a half saros). This lunar eclipse is related to two annular solar eclipses of Solar Saros 132.

December 14, 2001	December 26, 2019

== See also ==
- List of lunar eclipses
- List of 21st-century lunar eclipses
- June 2011 lunar eclipse
- December 2011 lunar eclipse
- File:2010-12-21 Lunar Eclipse Sketch.gif Chart
- 2010 12 21 – Lunar Eclipse in Jacksonville, FL
- 2010 12 21 – Lunar Eclipse Sequence
