= January 2047 lunar eclipse =

Astronomical event

- Total eclipse
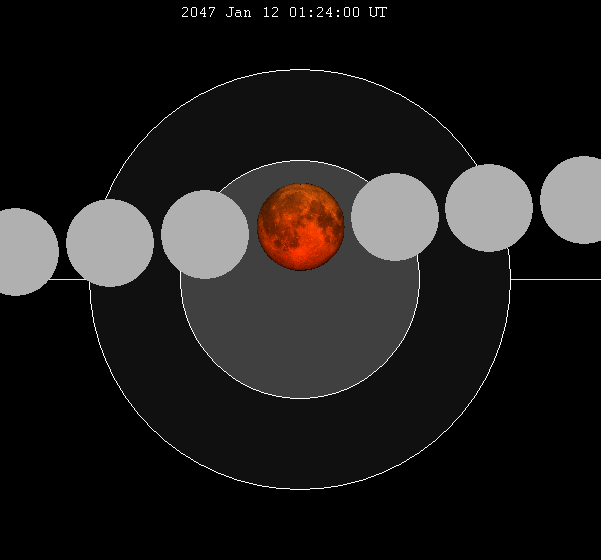
- The Moon's hourly motion shown right to left
- Date: January 12, 2047
- Gamma: 0.3317
- Magnitude: 1.2358
- Saros cycle: 125 (50 of 72)
- Totality: 70 minutes, 0 seconds
- Partiality: 208 minutes, 53 seconds
- Penumbral: 337 minutes, 13 seconds
Contacts (UTC)
- P1: 22:36:04
- U1: 23:40:19
- U2: 0:49:45
- Greatest: 1:24:44
- U3: 1:59:45
- U4: 3:09:12
- P4: 4:13:17

A total lunar eclipse will occur at the Moon’s descending node of orbit on Saturday, January 12, 2047, with an umbral magnitude of 1.2358. A lunar eclipse occurs when the Moon moves into the Earth's shadow, causing the Moon to be darkened. A total lunar eclipse occurs when the Moon's near side entirely passes into the Earth's umbral shadow. Unlike a solar eclipse, which can only be viewed from a relatively small area of the world, a lunar eclipse may be viewed from anywhere on the night side of Earth. A total lunar eclipse can last up to nearly two hours, while a total solar eclipse lasts only a few minutes at any given place, because the Moon's shadow is smaller. Occurring about 4.6 days before perigee (on January 16, 2047, at 16:20 UTC), the Moon's apparent diameter will be larger.

== Visibility ==
The eclipse will be completely visible over eastern North and South America, Europe, and much of Africa, seen rising over western North and South America and setting over much of Asia.

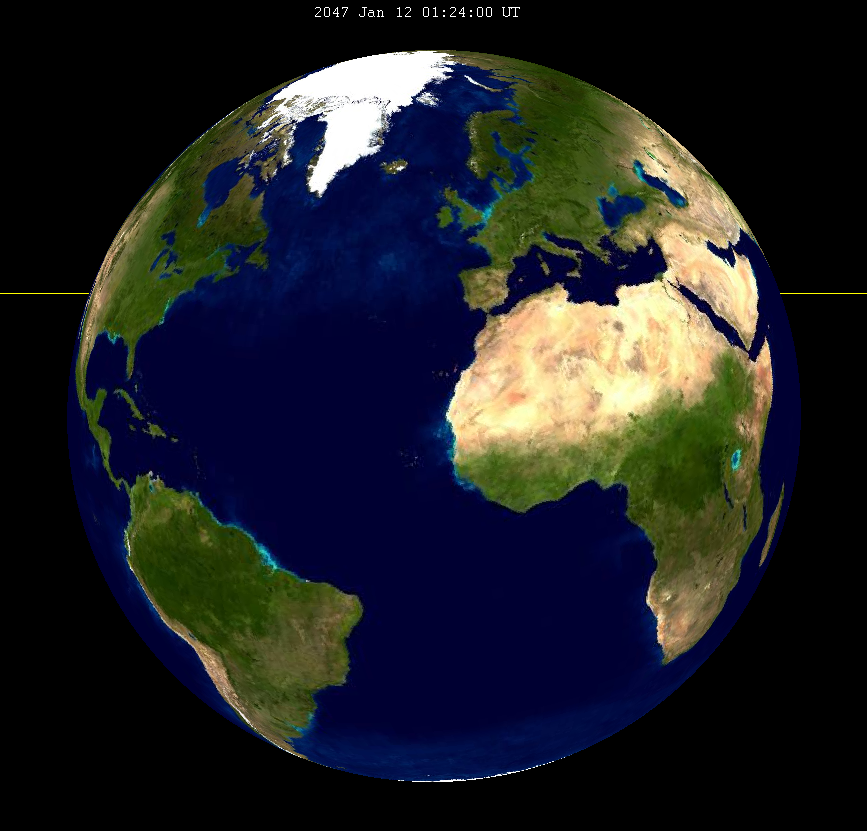
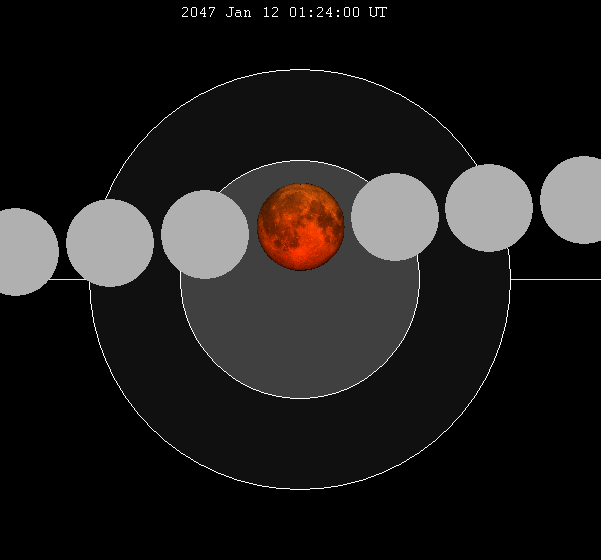

== Eclipse details ==
Shown below is a table displaying details about this particular solar eclipse. It describes various parameters pertaining to this eclipse.

January 12, 2047 Lunar Eclipse Parameters
| Parameter | Value |
|---|---|
| Penumbral Magnitude | 2.26653 |
| Umbral Magnitude | 1.23575 |
| Gamma | 0.33171 |
| Sun Right Ascension | 19h33m56.9s |
| Sun Declination | -21°40'46.3" |
| Sun Semi-Diameter | 16'15.8" |
| Sun Equatorial Horizontal Parallax | 08.9" |
| Moon Right Ascension | 07h34m18.1s |
| Moon Declination | +21°59'20.2" |
| Moon Semi-Diameter | 15'46.6" |
| Moon Equatorial Horizontal Parallax | 0°57'54.2" |
| ΔT | 83.2 s |

== Eclipse season ==
This eclipse is part of an eclipse season, a period, roughly every six months, when eclipses occur. Only two (or occasionally three) eclipse seasons occur each year, and each season lasts about 35 days and repeats just short of six months (173 days) later; thus two full eclipse seasons always occur each year. Either two or three eclipses happen each eclipse season. In the sequence below, each eclipse is separated by a fortnight.

Eclipse season of January 2047
| January 12 Descending node (full moon) | January 26 Ascending node (new moon) |
|---|---|
| Total lunar eclipse Lunar Saros 125 | Partial solar eclipse Solar Saros 151 |

== Related eclipses ==
=== Eclipses in 2047 ===
- A total lunar eclipse on January 12.
- A partial solar eclipse on January 26.
- A partial solar eclipse on June 23.
- A total lunar eclipse on July 7.
- A partial solar eclipse on July 22.
- A partial solar eclipse on December 16.

=== Metonic ===
- Preceded by: Lunar eclipse of March 25, 2043
- Followed by: Lunar eclipse of October 30, 2050

=== Tzolkinex ===
- Preceded by: Lunar eclipse of November 30, 2039
- Followed by: Lunar eclipse of February 22, 2054

=== Half-Saros ===
- Preceded by: Solar eclipse of January 5, 2038
- Followed by: Solar eclipse of January 16, 2056

=== Tritos ===
- Preceded by: Lunar eclipse of February 11, 2036
- Followed by: Lunar eclipse of December 11, 2057

=== Lunar Saros 125 ===
- Preceded by: Lunar eclipse of December 31, 2028
- Followed by: Lunar eclipse of January 22, 2065

=== Inex ===
- Preceded by: Lunar eclipse of January 31, 2018
- Followed by: Lunar eclipse of December 22, 2075

=== Triad ===
- Preceded by: Lunar eclipse of March 13, 1960
- Followed by: Lunar eclipse of November 12, 2133

=== Lunar eclipses of 2046–2049 ===
This eclipse is a member of a semester series. An eclipse in a semester series of lunar eclipses repeats approximately every 177 days and 4 hours (a semester) at alternating nodes of the Moon's orbit.

The penumbral lunar eclipses on May 17, 2049 and November 9, 2049 occur in the next lunar year eclipse set.

Lunar eclipse series sets from 2046 to 2049
| Descending node | | | | Ascending node | | | |
| Saros | Date Viewing | Type Chart | Gamma | Saros | Date Viewing | Type Chart | Gamma |
| 115 | 2046 Jan 22 | Partial | 0.9885 | 120 | 2046 Jul 18 | Partial | −0.8691 |
| 125 | 2047 Jan 12 | Total | 0.3317 | 130 | 2047 Jul 07 | Total | −0.0636 |
| 135 | 2048 Jan 01 | Total | −0.3745 | 140 | 2048 Jun 26 | Partial | 0.6796 |
| 145 | 2048 Dec 20 | Penumbral | −1.0624 | 150 | 2049 Jun 15 | Penumbral | 1.4068 |

=== Saros 125 ===
This eclipse is a part of Saros series 125, repeating every 18 years, 11 days, and containing 72 events. The series started with a penumbral lunar eclipse on July 17, 1163. It contains partial eclipses from January 17, 1470 through June 6, 1686; total eclipses from June 17, 1704 through March 19, 2155; and a second set of partial eclipses from March 29, 2173 through June 25, 2317. The series ends at member 72 as a penumbral eclipse on September 9, 2443.

The longest duration of totality was produced by member 37 at 100 minutes, 23 seconds on August 22, 1812. All eclipses in this series occur at the Moon’s descending node of orbit.

| Greatest | First | | | |
|---|---|---|---|---|
| The greatest eclipse of the series occurred on 1812 Aug 22, lasting 100 minutes, 23 seconds. | Penumbral | Partial | Total | Central |
| The greatest eclipse of the series occurred on 1812 Aug 22, lasting 100 minutes, 23 seconds. | 1163 Jul 17 | 1470 Jan 17 | 1704 Jun 17 | 1758 Jul 20 |
| The greatest eclipse of the series occurred on 1812 Aug 22, lasting 100 minutes, 23 seconds. | Last | | | |
| The greatest eclipse of the series occurred on 1812 Aug 22, lasting 100 minutes, 23 seconds. | Central | Total | Partial | Penumbral |
| The greatest eclipse of the series occurred on 1812 Aug 22, lasting 100 minutes, 23 seconds. | 1920 Oct 27 | 2155 Mar 19 | 2317 Jun 25 | 2443 Sep 09 |

Eclipses are tabulated in three columns; every third eclipse in the same column is one exeligmos apart, so they all cast shadows over approximately the same parts of the Earth.

Series members 37–58 occur between 1801 and 2200:
| 37 | 38 | 39 |
|---|---|---|
| 1812 Aug 22 | 1830 Sep 02 | 1848 Sep 13 |
| 40 | 41 | 42 |
| 1866 Sep 24 | 1884 Oct 04 | 1902 Oct 17 |
| 43 | 44 | 45 |
| 1920 Oct 27 | 1938 Nov 07 | 1956 Nov 18 |
| 46 | 47 | 48 |
| 1974 Nov 29 | 1992 Dec 09 | 2010 Dec 21 |
| 49 | 50 | 51 |
| 2028 Dec 31 | 2047 Jan 12 | 2065 Jan 22 |
| 52 | 53 | 54 |
| 2083 Feb 02 | 2101 Feb 14 | 2119 Feb 25 |
| 55 | 56 | 57 |
| 2137 Mar 07 | 2155 Mar 19 | 2173 Mar 29 |
58
2191 Apr 09

=== Tritos series ===
This eclipse is a part of a tritos cycle, repeating at alternating nodes every 135 synodic months (≈ 3986.63 days, or 11 years minus 1 month). Their appearance and longitude are irregular due to a lack of synchronization with the anomalistic month (period of perigee), but groupings of 3 tritos cycles (≈ 33 years minus 3 months) come close (≈ 434.044 anomalistic months), so eclipses are similar in these groupings.

Series members between 1801 and 2200
| 1806 Nov 26 (Saros 103) | | 1828 Sep 23 (Saros 105) | 1839 Aug 24 (Saros 106) | 1850 Jul 24 (Saros 107) |
| 1861 Jun 22 (Saros 108) | 1872 May 22 (Saros 109) | 1883 Apr 22 (Saros 110) | 1894 Mar 21 (Saros 111) | 1905 Feb 19 (Saros 112) |
| 1916 Jan 20 (Saros 113) | 1926 Dec 19 (Saros 114) | 1937 Nov 18 (Saros 115) | 1948 Oct 18 (Saros 116) | 1959 Sep 17 (Saros 117) |
| 1970 Aug 17 (Saros 118) | 1981 Jul 17 (Saros 119) | 1992 Jun 15 (Saros 120) | 2003 May 16 (Saros 121) | 2014 Apr 15 (Saros 122) |
| 2025 Mar 14 (Saros 123) | 2036 Feb 11 (Saros 124) | 2047 Jan 12 (Saros 125) | 2057 Dec 11 (Saros 126) | 2068 Nov 09 (Saros 127) |
| 2079 Oct 10 (Saros 128) | 2090 Sep 08 (Saros 129) | 2101 Aug 09 (Saros 130) | 2112 Jul 09 (Saros 131) | 2123 Jun 09 (Saros 132) |
| 2134 May 08 (Saros 133) | 2145 Apr 07 (Saros 134) | 2156 Mar 07 (Saros 135) | 2167 Feb 04 (Saros 136) | 2178 Jan 04 (Saros 137) |
| 2188 Dec 04 (Saros 138) | 2199 Nov 02 (Saros 139) | | | |

=== Inex series ===
This eclipse is a part of the long period inex cycle, repeating at alternating nodes, every 358 synodic months (≈ 10,571.95 days, or 29 years minus 20 days). Their appearance and longitude are irregular due to a lack of synchronization with the anomalistic month (period of perigee). However, groupings of 3 inex cycles (≈ 87 years minus 2 months) comes close (≈ 1,151.02 anomalistic months), so eclipses are similar in these groupings.

Series members between 1801 and 2200
| 1815 Jun 21 (Saros 117) | 1844 May 31 (Saros 118) | 1873 May 12 (Saros 119) |
| 1902 Apr 22 (Saros 120) | 1931 Apr 02 (Saros 121) | 1960 Mar 13 (Saros 122) |
| 1989 Feb 20 (Saros 123) | 2018 Jan 31 (Saros 124) | 2047 Jan 12 (Saros 125) |
| 2075 Dec 22 (Saros 126) | 2104 Dec 02 (Saros 127) | 2133 Nov 12 (Saros 128) |
| 2162 Oct 23 (Saros 129) | 2191 Oct 02 (Saros 130) | |

=== Half-Saros cycle ===
A lunar eclipse will be preceded and followed by solar eclipses by 9 years and 5.5 days (a half saros). This lunar eclipse is related to two annular solar eclipses of Solar Saros 132.

| January 5, 2038 | January 16, 2056 |

== See also ==
- List of lunar eclipses and List of 21st-century lunar eclipses
