= November 1938 lunar eclipse =

Total lunar eclipse November 7, 1938

- Total eclipse
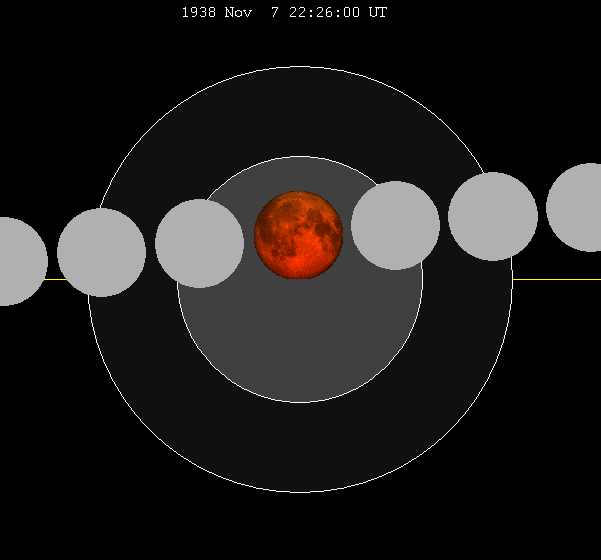
- The Moon's hourly motion shown right to left
- Date: November 7, 1938
- Gamma: 0.2739
- Magnitude: 1.3525
- Saros cycle: 125 (44 of 72)
- Totality: 81 minutes, 26 seconds
- Partiality: 210 minutes, 11 seconds
- Penumbral: 331 minutes, 28 seconds
Contacts (UTC)
- P1: 19:40:32
- U1: 20:41:14
- U2: 21:45:36
- Greatest: 22:26:18
- U3: 23:07:02
- U4: 0:11:25
- P4: 1:12:00

A total lunar eclipse occurred at the Moon’s descending node of orbit on Monday, November 7, 1938, with an umbral magnitude of 1.3525. A lunar eclipse occurs when the Moon moves into the Earth's shadow, causing the Moon to be darkened. A total lunar eclipse occurs when the Moon's near side entirely passes into the Earth's umbral shadow. Unlike a solar eclipse, which can only be viewed from a relatively small area of the world, a lunar eclipse may be viewed from anywhere on the night side of Earth. A total lunar eclipse can last up to nearly two hours, while a total solar eclipse lasts only a few minutes at any given place, because the Moon's shadow is smaller. Occurring about 3.2 days before perigee (on November 11, 1938, at 3:25 UTC), the Moon's apparent diameter was larger.

This lunar eclipse was the second of an almost tetrad, with the others being on May 14, 1938 (total); May 3, 1939 (total); and October 28, 1939 (partial).

== Visibility ==
The eclipse was completely visible over Africa, Europe, and west and central Asia, seen rising over North and South America and setting over east Asia and western Australia.

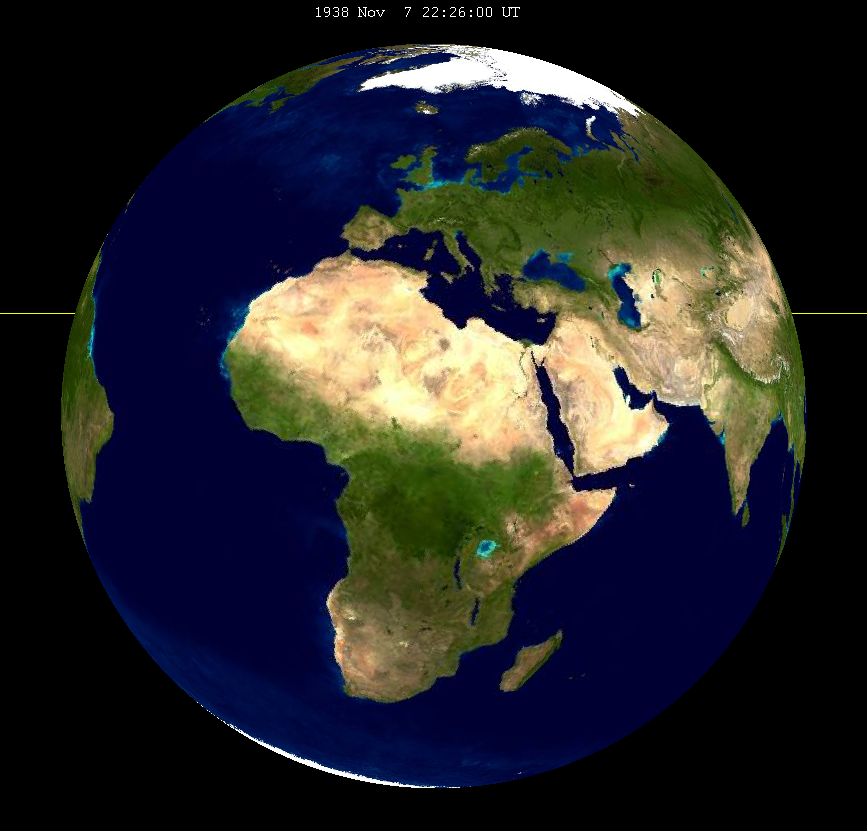
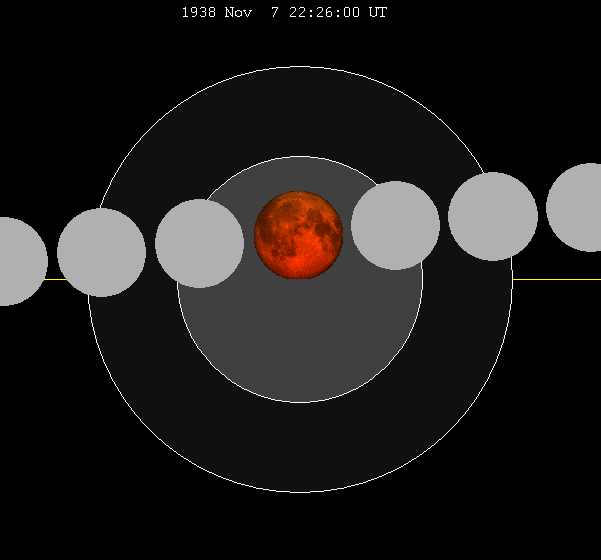

== Eclipse details ==
Shown below is a table displaying details about this particular solar eclipse. It describes various parameters pertaining to this eclipse.

November 7, 1938 Lunar Eclipse Parameters
Parameter	Value
Penumbral Magnitude	2.35850
Umbral Magnitude	1.35251
Gamma	0.27386
Sun Right Ascension	14h49m34.6s
Sun Declination	-16°17'56.2"
Sun Semi-Diameter	16'08.6"
Sun Equatorial Horizontal Parallax	08.9"
Moon Right Ascension	02h49m21.3s
Moon Declination	+16°33'44.7"
Moon Semi-Diameter	16'02.9"
Moon Equatorial Horizontal Parallax	0°58'53.8"
ΔT	24.1 s

== Eclipse season ==
This eclipse is part of an eclipse season, a period, roughly every six months, when eclipses occur. Only two (or occasionally three) eclipse seasons occur each year, and each season lasts about 35 days and repeats just short of six months (173 days) later; thus two full eclipse seasons always occur each year. Either two or three eclipses happen each eclipse season. In the sequence below, each eclipse is separated by a fortnight.

Eclipse season of November 1938
November 7 Descending node (full moon)	November 21 Ascending node (new moon)
Total lunar eclipse Lunar Saros 125	Partial solar eclipse Solar Saros 151

== Related eclipses ==
=== Eclipses in 1938 ===
- A total lunar eclipse on May 14.
- A total solar eclipse on May 29.
- A total lunar eclipse on November 7.
- A partial solar eclipse on November 21.

=== Metonic ===
- Preceded by: Lunar eclipse of January 19, 1935
- Followed by: Lunar eclipse of August 26, 1942

=== Tzolkinex ===
- Preceded by: Lunar eclipse of September 26, 1931
- Followed by: Lunar eclipse of December 19, 1945

=== Half-Saros ===
- Preceded by: Solar eclipse of November 1, 1929
- Followed by: Solar eclipse of November 12, 1947

=== Tritos ===
- Preceded by: Lunar eclipse of December 8, 1927
- Followed by: Lunar eclipse of October 7, 1949

=== Lunar Saros 125 ===
- Preceded by: Lunar eclipse of October 27, 1920
- Followed by: Lunar eclipse of November 18, 1956

=== Inex ===
- Preceded by: Lunar eclipse of November 27, 1909
- Followed by: Lunar eclipse of October 18, 1967

=== Triad ===
- Preceded by: Lunar eclipse of January 7, 1852
- Followed by: Lunar eclipse of September 7, 2025

=== Lunar eclipses of 1937–1940 ===
This eclipse is a member of a semester series. An eclipse in a semester series of lunar eclipses repeats approximately every 177 days and 4 hours (a semester) at alternating nodes of the Moon's orbit.

The penumbral lunar eclipse on March 23, 1940 occurs in the next lunar year eclipse set.

Lunar eclipse series sets from 1937 to 1940
Ascending node				Descending node			
Saros	Date Viewing	Type Chart	Gamma	Saros	Date Viewing	Type Chart	Gamma
110	1937 May 25	Penumbral	−1.1582	115	1937 Nov 18	Partial	0.9421
120	1938 May 14	Total	−0.3994	125	1938 Nov 07	Total	0.2739
130	1939 May 03	Total	0.3693	135	1939 Oct 28	Partial	−0.4581
140	1940 Apr 22	Penumbral	1.0741	145	1940 Oct 16	Penumbral	−1.1925

=== Saros 125 ===
This eclipse is a part of Saros series 125, repeating every 18 years, 11 days, and containing 72 events. The series started with a penumbral lunar eclipse on July 17, 1163. It contains partial eclipses from January 17, 1470 through June 6, 1686; total eclipses from June 17, 1704 through March 19, 2155; and a second set of partial eclipses from March 29, 2173 through June 25, 2317. The series ends at member 72 as a penumbral eclipse on September 9, 2443.

The longest duration of totality was produced by member 37 at 100 minutes, 23 seconds on August 22, 1812. All eclipses in this series occur at the Moon’s descending node of orbit.

Greatest	First			
The greatest eclipse of the series occurred on 1812 Aug 22, lasting 100 minutes, 23 seconds.	Penumbral	Partial	Total	Central
The greatest eclipse of the series occurred on 1812 Aug 22, lasting 100 minutes, 23 seconds.	1163 Jul 17	1470 Jan 17	1704 Jun 17	1758 Jul 20
The greatest eclipse of the series occurred on 1812 Aug 22, lasting 100 minutes, 23 seconds.	Last			
The greatest eclipse of the series occurred on 1812 Aug 22, lasting 100 minutes, 23 seconds.	Central	Total	Partial	Penumbral
The greatest eclipse of the series occurred on 1812 Aug 22, lasting 100 minutes, 23 seconds.	1920 Oct 27	2155 Mar 19	2317 Jun 25	2443 Sep 09

Eclipses are tabulated in three columns; every third eclipse in the same column is one exeligmos apart, so they all cast shadows over approximately the same parts of the Earth.

Series members 37–58 occur between 1801 and 2200:
37	38	39
1812 Aug 22	1830 Sep 02	1848 Sep 13
40	41	42
1866 Sep 24	1884 Oct 04	1902 Oct 17
43	44	45
1920 Oct 27	1938 Nov 07	1956 Nov 18
46	47	48
1974 Nov 29	1992 Dec 09	2010 Dec 21
49	50	51
2028 Dec 31	2047 Jan 12	2065 Jan 22
52	53	54
2083 Feb 02	2101 Feb 14	2119 Feb 25
55	56	57
2137 Mar 07	2155 Mar 19	2173 Mar 29
58
2191 Apr 09

=== Tritos series ===
This eclipse is a part of a tritos cycle, repeating at alternating nodes every 135 synodic months (≈ 3986.63 days, or 11 years minus 1 month). Their appearance and longitude are irregular due to a lack of synchronization with the anomalistic month (period of perigee), but groupings of 3 tritos cycles (≈ 33 years minus 3 months) come close (≈ 434.044 anomalistic months), so eclipses are similar in these groupings.

Series members between 1801 and 2200
1807 Nov 15 (Saros 113)	1818 Oct 14 (Saros 114)	1829 Sep 13 (Saros 115)	1840 Aug 13 (Saros 116)	1851 Jul 13 (Saros 117)
1862 Jun 12 (Saros 118)	1873 May 12 (Saros 119)	1884 Apr 10 (Saros 120)	1895 Mar 11 (Saros 121)	1906 Feb 09 (Saros 122)
1917 Jan 08 (Saros 123)	1927 Dec 08 (Saros 124)	1938 Nov 07 (Saros 125)	1949 Oct 07 (Saros 126)	1960 Sep 05 (Saros 127)
1971 Aug 06 (Saros 128)	1982 Jul 06 (Saros 129)	1993 Jun 04 (Saros 130)	2004 May 04 (Saros 131)	2015 Apr 04 (Saros 132)
2026 Mar 03 (Saros 133)	2037 Jan 31 (Saros 134)	2048 Jan 01 (Saros 135)	2058 Nov 30 (Saros 136)	2069 Oct 30 (Saros 137)
2080 Sep 29 (Saros 138)	2091 Aug 29 (Saros 139)	2102 Jul 30 (Saros 140)	2113 Jun 29 (Saros 141)	2124 May 28 (Saros 142)
2135 Apr 28 (Saros 143)	2146 Mar 28 (Saros 144)	2157 Feb 24 (Saros 145)	2168 Jan 24 (Saros 146)	2178 Dec 24 (Saros 147)
2189 Nov 22 (Saros 148)	2200 Oct 23 (Saros 149)			

=== Inex series ===
This eclipse is a part of the long period inex cycle, repeating at alternating nodes, every 358 synodic months (≈ 10,571.95 days, or 29 years minus 20 days). Their appearance and longitude are irregular due to a lack of synchronization with the anomalistic month (period of perigee). However, groupings of 3 inex cycles (≈ 87 years minus 2 months) comes close (≈ 1,151.02 anomalistic months), so eclipses are similar in these groupings.

Series members between 1801 and 2200
1823 Jan 26 (Saros 121)	1852 Jan 07 (Saros 122)	1880 Dec 16 (Saros 123)
1909 Nov 27 (Saros 124)	1938 Nov 07 (Saros 125)	1967 Oct 18 (Saros 126)
1996 Sep 27 (Saros 127)	2025 Sep 07 (Saros 128)	2054 Aug 18 (Saros 129)
2083 Jul 29 (Saros 130)	2112 Jul 09 (Saros 131)	2141 Jun 19 (Saros 132)
2170 May 30 (Saros 133)	2199 May 10 (Saros 134)	

=== Half-Saros cycle ===
A lunar eclipse will be preceded and followed by solar eclipses by 9 years and 5.5 days (a half saros). This lunar eclipse is related to two annular solar eclipses of Solar Saros 132.

November 1, 1929	November 12, 1947

== See also ==
- List of lunar eclipses
- List of 20th-century lunar eclipses
