= November 1974 lunar eclipse =

Total lunar eclipse

- Total eclipse
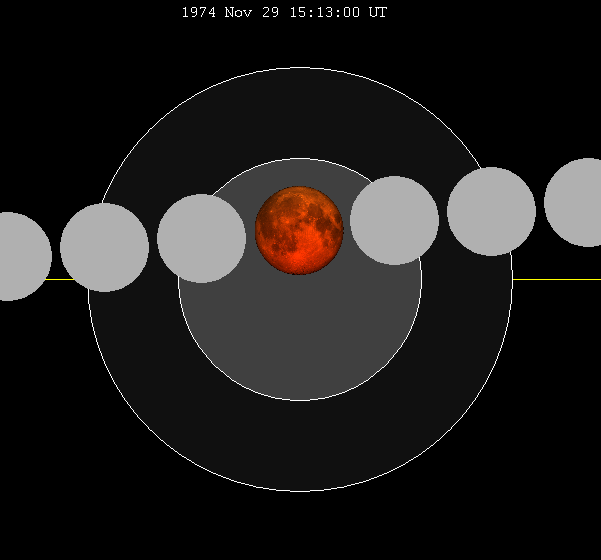
- The Moon's hourly motion shown right to left
- Date: November 29, 1974
- Gamma: 0.3054
- Magnitude: 1.2896
- Saros cycle: 125 (46 of 72)
- Totality: 75 minutes, 45 seconds
- Partiality: 208 minutes, 57 seconds
- Penumbral: 333 minutes, 4 seconds
Contacts (UTC)
- P1: 12:26:47
- U1: 13:28:55
- U2: 14:35:31
- Greatest: 15:13:22
- U3: 15:51:15
- U4: 16:57:52
- P4: 17:59:52

A total lunar eclipse occurred at the Moon’s descending node of orbit on Friday, November 29, 1974, with an umbral magnitude of 1.2896. A lunar eclipse occurs when the Moon moves into the Earth's shadow, causing the Moon to be darkened. A total lunar eclipse occurs when the Moon's near side entirely passes into the Earth's umbral shadow. Unlike a solar eclipse, which can only be viewed from a relatively small area of the world, a lunar eclipse may be viewed from anywhere on the night side of Earth. A total lunar eclipse can last up to nearly two hours, while a total solar eclipse lasts only a few minutes at any given place, because the Moon's shadow is smaller. Occurring about 3.6 days before perigee (on December 3, 1974, at 6:40 UTC), the Moon's apparent diameter was larger.

== Visibility ==
The eclipse was completely visible over Asia, Australia, and Alaska, seen rising over much of Africa, Europe, and the Middle East and setting over much of North America and the eastern Pacific Ocean.

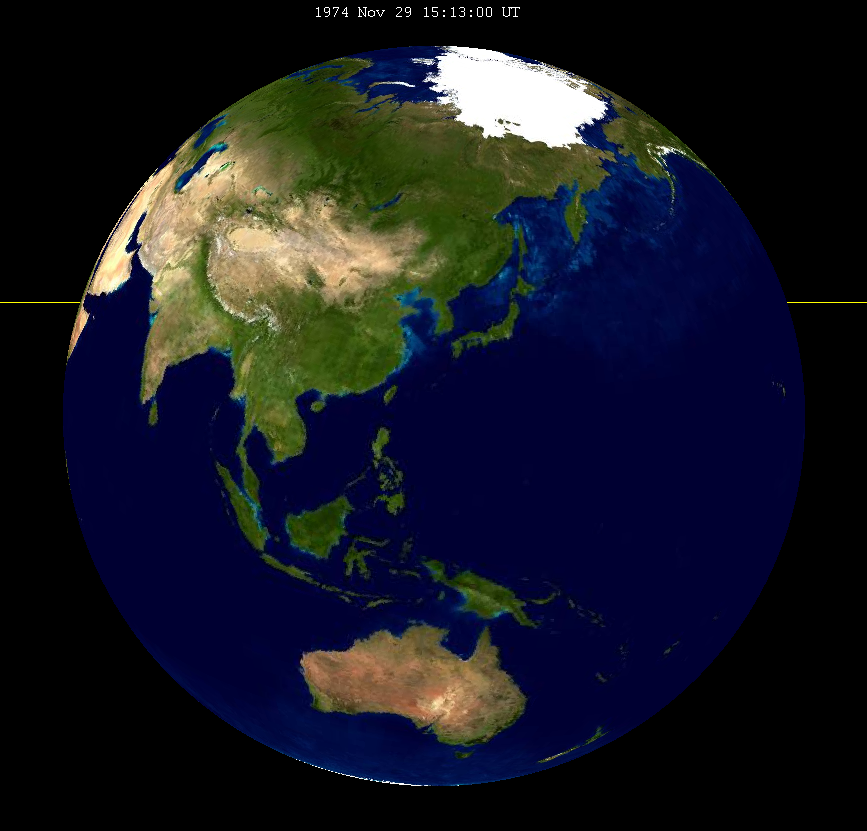
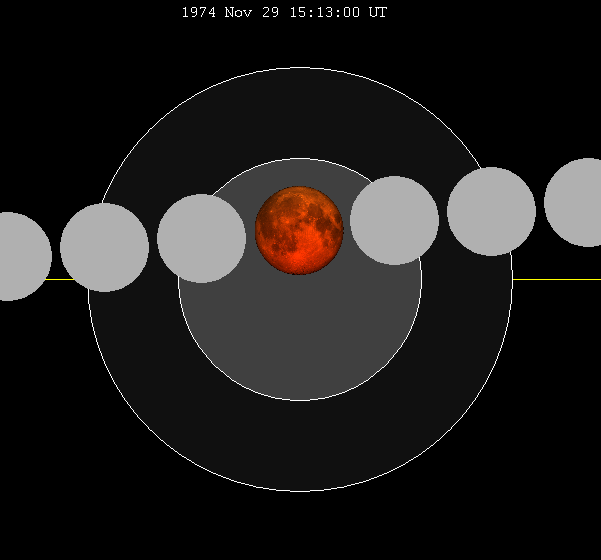

== Eclipse details ==
Shown below is a table displaying details about this particular solar eclipse. It describes various parameters pertaining to this eclipse.

November 29, 1974 Lunar Eclipse Parameters
Parameter	Value
Penumbral Magnitude	2.30575
Umbral Magnitude	1.28961
Gamma	0.30540
Sun Right Ascension	16h20m46.5s
Sun Declination	-21°29'03.2"
Sun Semi-Diameter	16'13.0"
Sun Equatorial Horizontal Parallax	08.9"
Moon Right Ascension	04h20m41.2s
Moon Declination	+21°46'53.8"
Moon Semi-Diameter	15'57.5"
Moon Equatorial Horizontal Parallax	0°58'34.1"
ΔT	45.3 s

== Eclipse season ==
This eclipse is part of an eclipse season, a period, roughly every six months, when eclipses occur. Only two (or occasionally three) eclipse seasons occur each year, and each season lasts about 35 days and repeats just short of six months (173 days) later; thus two full eclipse seasons always occur each year. Either two or three eclipses happen each eclipse season. In the sequence below, each eclipse is separated by a fortnight.

Eclipse season of November–December 1974
November 29 Descending node (full moon)	December 13 Ascending node (new moon)
Total lunar eclipse Lunar Saros 125	Partial solar eclipse Solar Saros 151

== Related eclipses ==
=== Eclipses in 1974 ===
- A partial lunar eclipse on June 4.
- A total solar eclipse on June 20.
- A total lunar eclipse on November 29.
- A partial solar eclipse on December 13.

=== Metonic ===
- Preceded by: Lunar eclipse of February 10, 1971
- Followed by: Lunar eclipse of September 16, 1978

=== Tzolkinex ===
- Preceded by: Lunar eclipse of October 18, 1967
- Followed by: Lunar eclipse of January 9, 1982

=== Half-Saros ===
- Preceded by: Solar eclipse of November 23, 1965
- Followed by: Solar eclipse of December 4, 1983

=== Tritos ===
- Preceded by: Lunar eclipse of December 30, 1963
- Followed by: Lunar eclipse of October 28, 1985

=== Lunar Saros 125 ===
- Preceded by: Lunar eclipse of November 18, 1956
- Followed by: Lunar eclipse of December 9, 1992

=== Inex ===
- Preceded by: Lunar eclipse of December 19, 1945
- Followed by: Lunar eclipse of November 9, 2003

=== Triad ===
- Preceded by: Lunar eclipse of January 28, 1888
- Followed by: Lunar eclipse of September 29, 2061

=== Lunar eclipses of 1973–1976 ===
This eclipse is a member of a semester series. An eclipse in a semester series of lunar eclipses repeats approximately every 177 days and 4 hours (a semester) at alternating nodes of the Moon's orbit.

The penumbral lunar eclipses on January 18, 1973 and July 15, 1973 occur in the previous lunar year eclipse set.

Lunar eclipse series sets from 1973 to 1976
Ascending node				Descending node			
Saros	Date Viewing	Type Chart	Gamma	Saros	Date Viewing	Type Chart	Gamma
110	1973 Jun 15	Penumbral	−1.3217	115	1973 Dec 10	Partial	0.9644
120	1974 Jun 04	Partial	−0.5489	125	1974 Nov 29	Total	0.3054
130	1975 May 25	Total	0.2367	135	1975 Nov 18	Total	−0.4134
140	1976 May 13	Partial	0.9586	145	1976 Nov 06	Penumbral	−1.1276

=== Saros 125 ===
This eclipse is a part of Saros series 125, repeating every 18 years, 11 days, and containing 72 events. The series started with a penumbral lunar eclipse on July 17, 1163. It contains partial eclipses from January 17, 1470 through June 6, 1686; total eclipses from June 17, 1704 through March 19, 2155; and a second set of partial eclipses from March 29, 2173 through June 25, 2317. The series ends at member 72 as a penumbral eclipse on September 9, 2443.

The longest duration of totality was produced by member 37 at 100 minutes, 23 seconds on August 22, 1812. All eclipses in this series occur at the Moon’s descending node of orbit.

Greatest	First			
The greatest eclipse of the series occurred on 1812 Aug 22, lasting 100 minutes, 23 seconds.	Penumbral	Partial	Total	Central
The greatest eclipse of the series occurred on 1812 Aug 22, lasting 100 minutes, 23 seconds.	1163 Jul 17	1470 Jan 17	1704 Jun 17	1758 Jul 20
The greatest eclipse of the series occurred on 1812 Aug 22, lasting 100 minutes, 23 seconds.	Last			
The greatest eclipse of the series occurred on 1812 Aug 22, lasting 100 minutes, 23 seconds.	Central	Total	Partial	Penumbral
The greatest eclipse of the series occurred on 1812 Aug 22, lasting 100 minutes, 23 seconds.	1920 Oct 27	2155 Mar 19	2317 Jun 25	2443 Sep 09

Eclipses are tabulated in three columns; every third eclipse in the same column is one exeligmos apart, so they all cast shadows over approximately the same parts of the Earth.

Series members 37–58 occur between 1801 and 2200:
37	38	39
1812 Aug 22	1830 Sep 02	1848 Sep 13
40	41	42
1866 Sep 24	1884 Oct 04	1902 Oct 17
43	44	45
1920 Oct 27	1938 Nov 07	1956 Nov 18
46	47	48
1974 Nov 29	1992 Dec 09	2010 Dec 21
49	50	51
2028 Dec 31	2047 Jan 12	2065 Jan 22
52	53	54
2083 Feb 02	2101 Feb 14	2119 Feb 25
55	56	57
2137 Mar 07	2155 Mar 19	2173 Mar 29
58
2191 Apr 09

=== Tritos series ===
This eclipse is a part of a tritos cycle, repeating at alternating nodes every 135 synodic months (≈ 3986.63 days, or 11 years minus 1 month). Their appearance and longitude are irregular due to a lack of synchronization with the anomalistic month (period of perigee), but groupings of 3 tritos cycles (≈ 33 years minus 3 months) come close (≈ 434.044 anomalistic months), so eclipses are similar in these groupings.

Series members between 1801 and 2200
1811 Mar 10 (Saros 110)	1822 Feb 06 (Saros 111)	1833 Jan 06 (Saros 112)	1843 Dec 07 (Saros 113)	1854 Nov 04 (Saros 114)
1865 Oct 04 (Saros 115)	1876 Sep 03 (Saros 116)	1887 Aug 03 (Saros 117)	1898 Jul 03 (Saros 118)	1909 Jun 04 (Saros 119)
1920 May 03 (Saros 120)	1931 Apr 02 (Saros 121)	1942 Mar 03 (Saros 122)	1953 Jan 29 (Saros 123)	1963 Dec 30 (Saros 124)
1974 Nov 29 (Saros 125)	1985 Oct 28 (Saros 126)	1996 Sep 27 (Saros 127)	2007 Aug 28 (Saros 128)	2018 Jul 27 (Saros 129)
2029 Jun 26 (Saros 130)	2040 May 26 (Saros 131)	2051 Apr 26 (Saros 132)	2062 Mar 25 (Saros 133)	2073 Feb 22 (Saros 134)
2084 Jan 22 (Saros 135)	2094 Dec 21 (Saros 136)	2105 Nov 21 (Saros 137)	2116 Oct 21 (Saros 138)	2127 Sep 20 (Saros 139)
2138 Aug 20 (Saros 140)	2149 Jul 20 (Saros 141)	2160 Jun 18 (Saros 142)	2171 May 19 (Saros 143)	2182 Apr 18 (Saros 144)
2193 Mar 17 (Saros 145)

=== Inex series ===
This eclipse is a part of the long period inex cycle, repeating at alternating nodes, every 358 synodic months (≈ 10,571.95 days, or 29 years minus 20 days). Their appearance and longitude are irregular due to a lack of synchronization with the anomalistic month (period of perigee). However, groupings of 3 inex cycles (≈ 87 years minus 2 months) comes close (≈ 1,151.02 anomalistic months), so eclipses are similar in these groupings.

Series members between 1801 and 2200
1801 Mar 30 (Saros 119)	1830 Mar 09 (Saros 120)	1859 Feb 17 (Saros 121)
1888 Jan 28 (Saros 122)	1917 Jan 08 (Saros 123)	1945 Dec 19 (Saros 124)
1974 Nov 29 (Saros 125)	2003 Nov 09 (Saros 126)	2032 Oct 18 (Saros 127)
2061 Sep 29 (Saros 128)	2090 Sep 08 (Saros 129)	2119 Aug 20 (Saros 130)
2148 Jul 31 (Saros 131)	2177 Jul 11 (Saros 132)	

=== Half-Saros cycle ===
A lunar eclipse will be preceded and followed by solar eclipses by 9 years and 5.5 days (a half saros). This lunar eclipse is related to two annular solar eclipses of Solar Saros 132.

November 23, 1965	December 4, 1983

== See also ==
- List of lunar eclipses
- List of 20th-century lunar eclipses
