= Lunar Saros 125 =

Series of lunar eclipses

Member 48
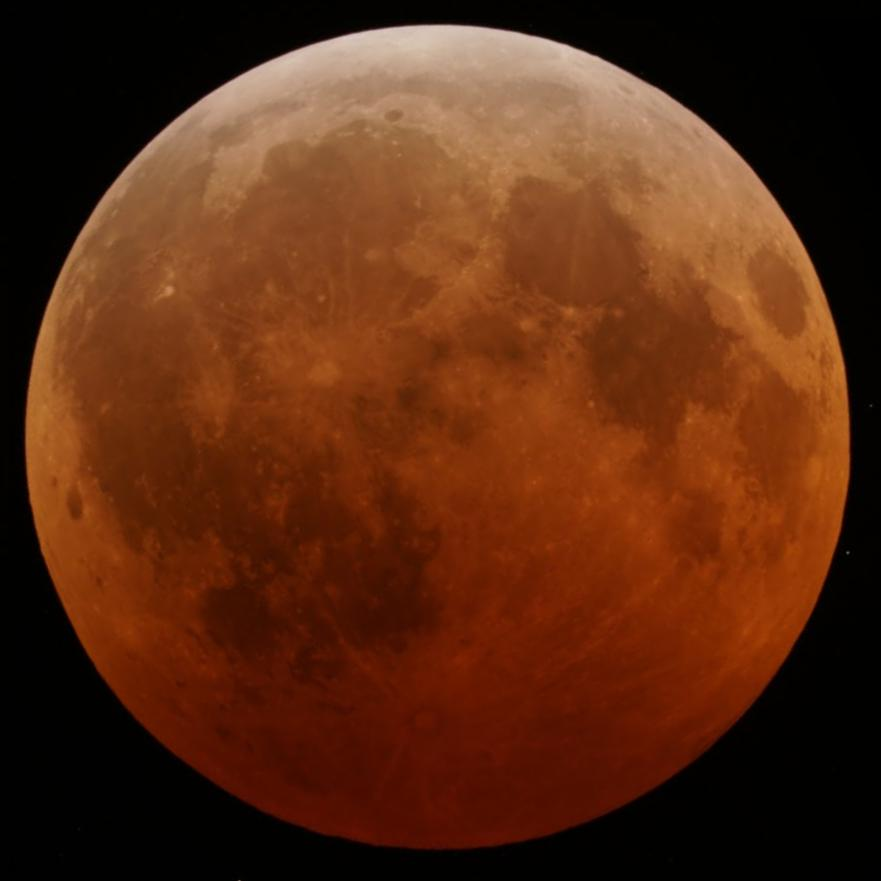
2010 Dec 21

Saros cycle series 125 for lunar eclipses occurs at the moon's descending node, repeats every 18 years 11 and 1/3 days. It contains 72 events.

This lunar saros is linked to Solar Saros 132.

Cat.	Saros	Mem	Date	Time UT (hr:mn)	Type	Gamma	Magnitude	Duration (min)			Contacts UT (hr:mn)						Chart
Cat.	Saros	Mem	Date	Greatest	Type	Gamma	Magnitude	Pen.	Par.	Tot.	P1	P4	U1	U2	U3	U4	Chart
07628	125	1	1163 Jul 17	11:51:17	Penumbral	-1.5011	-0.8798	80.1			11:11:14	12:31:20					
07675	125	2	1181 Jul 27	19:19:16	Penumbral	-1.4322	-0.7529	123.8			18:17:22	20:21:10					
07721	125	3	1199 Aug 8	2:52:18	Penumbral	-1.3665	-0.6322	152.8			1:35:54	4:08:42					
07767	125	4	1217 Aug 18	10:33:44	Penumbral	-1.3072	-0.5234	173.9			9:06:47	12:00:41					
07813	125	5	1235 Aug 29	18:21:53	Penumbral	-1.2528	-0.4237	190.3			16:46:44	19:57:02					
07858	125	6	1253 Sep 09	2:19:22	Penumbral	-1.2055	-0.3374	202.9			0:37:55	4:00:49					
07902	125	7	1271 Sep 20	10:24:01	Penumbral	-1.1637	-0.2613	213.0			8:37:31	12:10:31					
07947	125	8	1289 Sep 30	18:38:31	Penumbral	-1.1299	-0.1998	220.5			16:48:16	20:28:46					
07992	125	9	1307 Oct 12	3:00:20	Penumbral	-1.1017	-0.1488	226.4			1:07:08	4:53:32					
08035	125	10	1325 Oct 22	11:30:16	Penumbral	-1.0801	-0.1097	230.6			9:34:58	13:25:34					
08076	125	11	1343 Nov 02	20:06:56	Penumbral	-1.0639	-0.0804	233.7			18:10:05	22:03:47					
08118	125	12	1361 Nov 13	4:49:55	Penumbral	-1.0525	-0.0598	235.7			2:52:04	6:47:46					
08159	125	13	1379 Nov 24	13:37:20	Penumbral	-1.0449	-0.0461	236.9			11:38:53	15:35:47					
08200	125	14	1397 Dec 04	22:27:28	Penumbral	-1.0394	-0.0359	237.8			20:28:34	0:26:22					
08241	125	15	1415 Dec 16	7:19:54	Penumbral	-1.0357	-0.0290	238.2			5:20:48	9:19:00					
08283	125	16	1433 Dec 26	16:12:40	Penumbral	-1.0319	-0.0215	238.7			14:13:19	18:12:01					
08324	125	17	1452 Jan 07	1:03:46	Penumbral	-1.0269	-0.0117	239.4			23:04:04	3:03:28					
08365	125	18	1470 Jan 17	9:51:49	Partial	-1.0194	0.0030	240.5	11.9		7:51:34	11:52:04	9:45:52			9:57:46	
08405	125	19	1488 Jan 28	18:35:29	Partial	-1.0083	0.0243	242.2	33.8		16:34:23	20:36:35	18:18:35			18:52:23	
08445	125	20	1506 Feb 08	3:14:07	Partial	-0.9931	0.0532	244.6	49.8		1:11:49	5:16:25	2:49:13			3:39:01	
08486	125	21	1524 Feb 19	11:45:16	Partial	-0.9719	0.0933	248.0	65.6		9:41:16	13:49:16	11:12:28			12:18:04	
08527	125	22	1542 Mar 01	20:10:00	Partial	-0.9455	0.1430	252.1	80.7		18:03:57	22:16:03	19:29:39			20:50:21	
08570	125	23	1560 Mar 12	4:26:27	Partial	-0.9127	0.2045	257.1	95.8		2:17:54	6:35:00	3:38:33			5:14:21	
08613	125	24	1578 Mar 23	12:35:23	Partial	-0.8738	0.2770	262.7	110.4		10:24:02	14:46:44	11:40:11			13:30:35	
08656	125	25	1596 Apr 12	20:35:30	Partial	-0.8278	0.3623	268.9	124.8		18:21:03	22:49:57	19:33:06			21:37:54	
08700	125	26	1614 Apr 24	4:28:48	Partial	-0.7766	0.4573	275.4	138.3		2:11:06	6:46:30	3:19:39			5:37:57	
08744	125	27	1632 May 4	12:15:05	Partial	-0.7196	0.5625	282.1	151.1		9:54:02	14:36:08	10:59:32			13:30:38	
08788	125	28	1650 May 15	19:54:19	Partial	-0.6570	0.6778	288.8	163.1		17:29:55	22:18:43	18:32:46			21:15:52	
08833	125	29	1668 May 26	3:28:47	Partial	-0.5909	0.7993	295.2	173.8		1:01:11	5:56:23	2:01:53			4:55:41	
08879	125	30	1686 Jun 06	10:58:28	Partial	-0.5211	0.9273	301.3	183.4		8:27:49	13:29:07	9:26:46			12:30:10	
08925	125	31	1704 Jun 17	18:25:46	Total	-0.4494	1.0583	306.8	191.7	35.7	15:52:22	20:59:10	16:49:55	18:07:55	18:43:37	20:01:37	
08972	125	32	1722 Jun 29	1:49:16	Total	-0.3750	1.1942	311.8	198.8	62.7	23:13:22	4:25:10	0:09:52	1:17:55	2:20:37	3:28:40	
09019	125	33	1740 Jul 09	9:13:16	Total	-0.3014	1.3281	316.1	204.5	78.0	6:35:13	11:51:19	7:31:01	8:34:16	9:52:16	10:55:31	
09066	125	34	1758 Jul 20	16:36:44	Total	-0.2279	1.4615	319.7	208.9	88.3	13:56:53	19:16:35	14:52:17	15:52:35	17:20:53	18:21:11	
09112	125	35	1776 Jul 31	0:02:02	Total	-0.1566	1.5907	322.7	212.2	94.9	21:20:41	2:43:23	22:15:56	23:14:35	0:49:29	1:48:08	
09157	125	36	1794 Aug 11	7:29:21	Total	-0.0874	1.7157	324.9	214.3	98.8	4:46:54	10:11:48	5:42:12	6:39:57	8:18:45	9:16:30	
09202	125	37	1812 Aug 22	15:01:22	Total	-0.0228	1.8320	326.7	215.4	100.4	12:18:01	17:44:43	13:13:40	14:11:10	15:51:34	16:49:04	
09247	125	38	1830 Sep 02	22:37:55	Total	0.0371	1.8034	327.9	215.7	100.2	19:53:58	1:21:52	20:50:04	21:47:49	23:28:01	0:25:46	
09294	125	39	1848 Sep 13	6:19:25	Total	0.0922	1.6997	328.8	215.4	98.6	3:35:01	9:03:49	4:31:43	5:30:07	7:08:43	8:07:07	
09338	125	40	1866 Sep 24	14:07:14	Total	0.1412	1.6071	329.4	214.6	96.0	11:22:32	16:51:56	12:19:56	13:19:14	14:55:14	15:54:32	
09381	125	41	1884 Oct 04	22:01:55	Total	0.1839	1.5260	329.9	213.5	92.6	19:16:58	0:46:52	20:15:10	21:15:37	22:48:13	23:48:40	
09425	125	42	1902 Oct 17	6:03:26	Total	0.2201	1.4566	330.4	212.3	88.8	3:18:14	8:48:38	4:17:17	5:19:02	6:47:50	7:49:35	
09467	125	43	1920 Oct 27	14:11:38	Total	0.2502	1.3987	330.9	211.1	85.0	11:26:11	16:57:05	12:26:05	13:29:08	14:54:08	15:57:11	
09509	125	44	1938 Nov 07	22:26:42	Total	0.2738	1.3525	331.5	210.2	81.4	19:40:57	1:12:27	20:41:36	21:46:00	23:07:24	0:11:48	
09550	125	45	1956 Nov 18	6:48:16	Total	0.2917	1.3172	332.2	209.5	78.4	4:02:10	9:34:22	5:03:31	6:09:04	7:27:28	8:33:01	
09592	125	46	1974 Nov 29	15:14:07	Total	0.3054	1.2896	333.1	208.9	75.7	12:27:34	18:00:40	13:29:40	14:36:16	15:51:58	16:58:34	
09633	125	47	1992 Dec 09	23:45:05	Total	0.3144	1.2709	334.1	208.7	73.9	20:58:02	2:32:08	22:00:44	23:08:08	0:22:02	1:29:26	
09674	125	48	2010 Dec 21	8:18:04	Total	0.3214	1.2561	335.1	208.7	72.3	5:30:31	11:05:37	6:33:43	7:41:55	8:54:13	10:02:25	
09715	125	49	2028 Dec 31	16:53:15	Total	0.3258	1.2463	336.2	208.8	71.3	14:05:09	19:41:21	15:08:51	16:17:36	17:28:54	18:37:39	
09755	125	50	2047 Jan 12	1:26:14	Total	0.3317	1.2341	337.2	208.9	70.0	22:37:38	4:14:50	23:41:47	0:51:14	2:01:14	3:10:41	
09796	125	51	2065 Jan 22	9:58:58	Total	0.3371	1.2231	338.2	209.0	68.8	7:09:52	12:48:04	8:14:28	9:24:34	10:33:22	11:43:28	
09837	125	52	2083 Feb 02	18:26:46	Total	0.3463	1.2052	338.9	208.8	66.5	15:37:19	21:16:13	16:42:22	17:53:31	19:00:01	20:11:10	
09879	125	53	2101 Feb 14	2:50:00	Total	0.3584	1.1825	339.4	208.4	63.4	0:00:18	5:39:42	1:05:48	2:18:18	3:21:42	4:34:12	
09921	125	54	2119 Feb 25	11:05:13	Total	0.3765	1.1490	339.5	207.4	58.1	8:15:28	13:54:58	9:21:31	10:36:10	11:34:16	12:48:55	
09964	125	55	2137 Mar 07	19:13:43	Total	0.3992	1.1069	339.3	205.8	50.0	16:24:04	22:03:22	17:30:49	18:48:43	19:38:43	20:56:37	
10009	125	56	2155 Mar 19	3:12:45	Total	0.4293	1.0517	338.5	203.4	35.5	0:23:30	6:02:00	1:31:03	2:55:00	3:30:30	4:54:27	
10052	125	57	2173 Mar 29	11:02:23	Partial	0.4662	0.9839	337.1	199.9		8:13:50	13:50:56	9:22:26			12:42:20	
10095	125	58	2191 Apr 09	18:42:01	Partial	0.5107	0.9022	334.9	194.9		15:54:34	21:29:28	17:04:34			20:19:28	
10138	125	59	2209 Apr 21	2:12:20	Partial	0.5617	0.8086	331.7	188.1		23:26:29	4:58:11	0:38:17			3:46:23	
10182	125	60	2227 May 2	9:32:27	Partial	0.6204	0.7008	327.3	179.0		6:48:48	12:16:06	8:02:57			11:01:57	
10227	125	61	2245 May 12	16:43:42	Partial	0.6856	0.5809	321.6	166.7		14:02:54	19:24:30	15:20:21			18:07:03	
10273	125	62	2263 May 23	23:46:25	Partial	0.7568	0.4499	314.2	150.2		21:09:19	2:23:31	22:31:19			1:01:31	
10319	125	63	2281 Jun 03	6:42:43	Partial	0.8322	0.3110	305.1	127.9		4:10:10	9:15:16	5:38:46			7:46:40	
10365	125	64	2299 Jun 14	13:31:01	Partial	0.9131	0.1618	293.7	94.6		11:04:10	15:57:52	12:43:43			14:18:19	
10411	125	65	2317 Jun 25	20:15:57	Partial	0.9955	0.0097	280.2	23.7		17:55:51	22:36:03	20:04:06			20:27:48	
10457	125	66	2335 Jul 07	2:55:54	Penumbral	1.0806	-0.1476	263.8			0:44:00	5:07:48					
10503	125	67	2353 Jul 17	9:35:20	Penumbral	1.1652	-0.3043	244.7			7:32:59	11:37:41					
10548	125	68	2371 Jul 28	16:11:29	Penumbral	1.2511	-0.4635	221.7			14:20:38	18:02:20					
10592	125	69	2389 Aug 07	22:50:34	Penumbral	1.3334	-0.6162	194.9			21:13:07	0:28:01					
10637	125	70	2407 Aug 19	5:30:19	Penumbral	1.4137	-0.7656	162.1			4:09:16	6:51:22					
10681	125	71	2425 Aug 29	12:14:31	Penumbral	1.4893	-0.9064	120.4			11:14:19	13:14:43					
10725	125	72	2443 Sep 09	19:02:39	Penumbral	1.5609	-1.0399	51.7			18:36:48	19:28:30					

== See also ==
- List of lunar eclipses
  - List of Saros series for lunar eclipses
