= November 1956 lunar eclipse =

Total lunar eclipse November 18, 1956

- Total eclipse
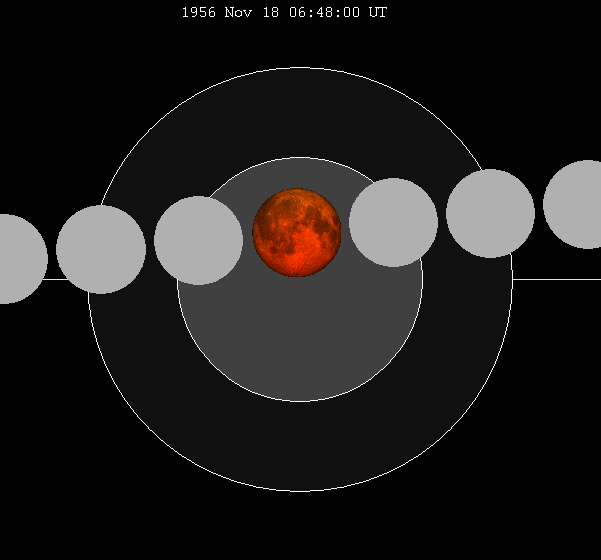
- The Moon's hourly motion shown right to left
- Date: November 18, 1956
- Gamma: 0.2917
- Magnitude: 1.3172
- Saros cycle: 125 (45 of 72)
- Totality: 78 minutes, 22 seconds
- Partiality: 209 minutes, 27 seconds
- Penumbral: 332 minutes, 13 seconds
Contacts (UTC)
- P1: 4:01:35
- U1: 5:03:02
- U2: 6:08:34
- Greatest: 6:47:44
- U3: 7:26:56
- U4: 8:32:29
- P4: 9:33:49

A total lunar eclipse occurred at the Moon’s descending node of orbit on Sunday, November 18, 1956, with an umbral magnitude of 1.3172. A lunar eclipse occurs when the Moon moves into the Earth's shadow, causing the Moon to be darkened. A total lunar eclipse occurs when the Moon's near side entirely passes into the Earth's umbral shadow. Unlike a solar eclipse, which can only be viewed from a relatively small area of the world, a lunar eclipse may be viewed from anywhere on the night side of Earth. A total lunar eclipse can last up to nearly two hours, while a total solar eclipse lasts only a few minutes at any given place, because the Moon's shadow is smaller. Occurring about 3.4 days before perigee (on November 21, 1956, at 16:45 UTC), the Moon's apparent diameter was larger.

This lunar eclipse was the second of an almost tetrad, with the others being on May 24, 1956 (partial); May 13, 1957 (total); and November 7, 1957 (total).

== Visibility ==
The eclipse was completely visible over North America and western South America, seen rising over northeast Asia and eastern Australia and setting over eastern South America, west and central Africa, and Europe.

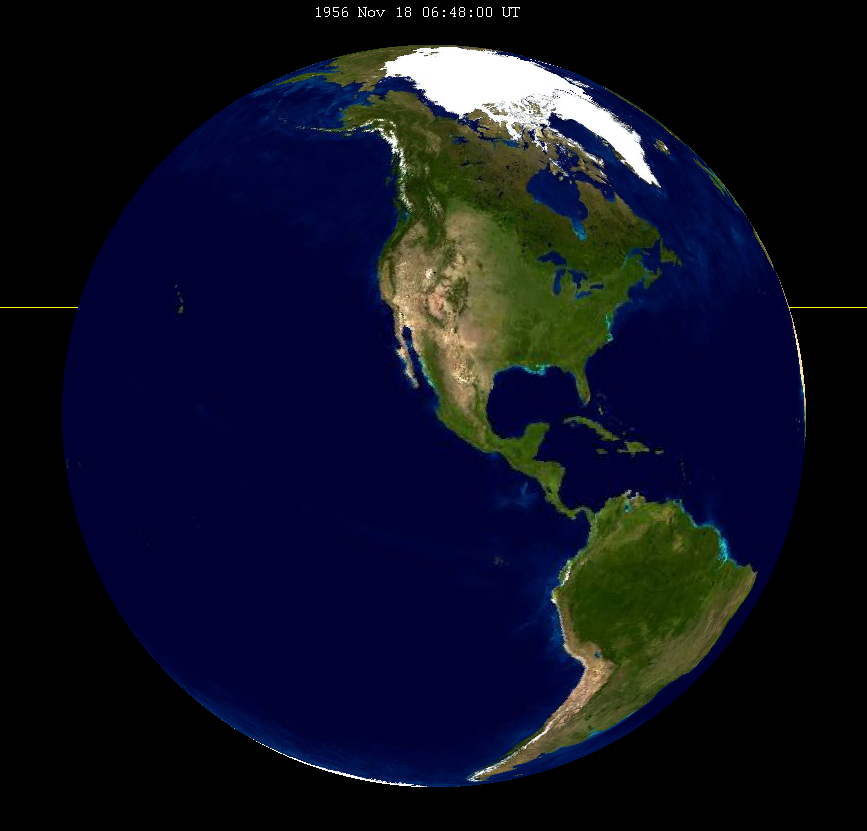
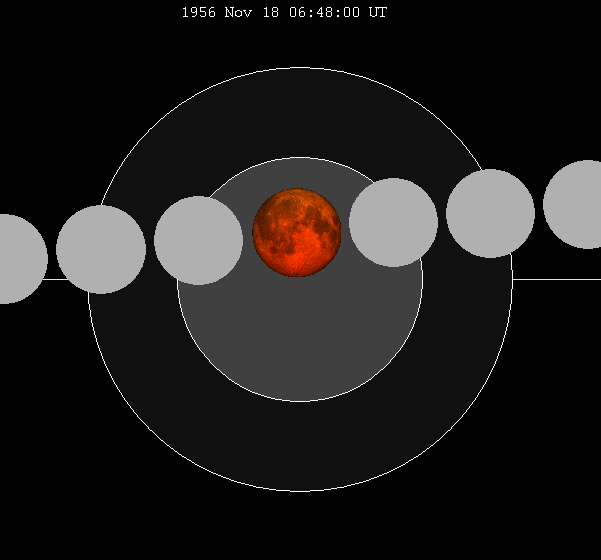

== Eclipse details ==
Shown below is a table displaying details about this particular solar eclipse. It describes various parameters pertaining to this eclipse.

November 18, 1956 Lunar Eclipse Parameters
Parameter	Value
Penumbral Magnitude	2.32849
Umbral Magnitude	1.31720
Gamma	0.29167
Sun Right Ascension	15h34m22.3s
Sun Declination	-19°14'20.7"
Sun Semi-Diameter	16'11.0"
Sun Equatorial Horizontal Parallax	08.9"
Moon Right Ascension	03h34m12.2s
Moon Declination	+19°31'18.5"
Moon Semi-Diameter	16'00.2"
Moon Equatorial Horizontal Parallax	0°58'44.0"
ΔT	31.8 s

== Eclipse season ==
This eclipse is part of an eclipse season, a period, roughly every six months, when eclipses occur. Only two (or occasionally three) eclipse seasons occur each year, and each season lasts about 35 days and repeats just short of six months (173 days) later; thus two full eclipse seasons always occur each year. Either two or three eclipses happen each eclipse season. In the sequence below, each eclipse is separated by a fortnight.

Eclipse season of November–December 1956
November 18 Descending node (full moon)	December 2 Ascending node (new moon)
Total lunar eclipse Lunar Saros 125	Partial solar eclipse Solar Saros 151

== Related eclipses ==
=== Eclipses in 1956 ===
- A partial lunar eclipse on May 24.
- A total solar eclipse on June 8.
- A total lunar eclipse on November 18.
- A partial solar eclipse on December 2.

=== Metonic ===
- Preceded by: Lunar eclipse of January 29, 1953
- Followed by: Lunar eclipse of September 5, 1960

=== Tzolkinex ===
- Preceded by: Lunar eclipse of October 7, 1949
- Followed by: Lunar eclipse of December 30, 1963

=== Half-Saros ===
- Preceded by: Solar eclipse of November 12, 1947
- Followed by: Solar eclipse of November 23, 1965

=== Tritos ===
- Preceded by: Lunar eclipse of December 19, 1945
- Followed by: Lunar eclipse of October 18, 1967

=== Lunar Saros 125 ===
- Preceded by: Lunar eclipse of November 7, 1938
- Followed by: Lunar eclipse of November 29, 1974

=== Inex ===
- Preceded by: Lunar eclipse of December 8, 1927
- Followed by: Lunar eclipse of October 28, 1985

=== Triad ===
- Preceded by: Lunar eclipse of January 17, 1870
- Followed by: Lunar eclipse of September 19, 2043

=== Lunar eclipses of 1955–1958 ===
This eclipse is a member of a semester series. An eclipse in a semester series of lunar eclipses repeats approximately every 177 days and 4 hours (a semester) at alternating nodes of the Moon's orbit.

The penumbral lunar eclipse on January 8, 1955 occurs in the previous lunar year eclipse set, and the penumbral lunar eclipse on April 4, 1958 occurs in the next lunar year eclipse set.

Lunar eclipse series sets from 1955 to 1958
Ascending node				Descending node			
Saros	Date Viewing	Type Chart	Gamma	Saros	Date Viewing	Type Chart	Gamma
110	1955 Jun 05	Penumbral	−1.2384	115	1955 Nov 29	Partial	0.9551
120	1956 May 24	Partial	−0.4726	125	1956 Nov 18	Total	0.2917
130	1957 May 13	Total	0.3046	135	1957 Nov 07	Total	−0.4332
140	1958 May 03	Partial	1.0188	145	1958 Oct 27	Penumbral	−1.1571

=== Saros 125 ===
This eclipse is a part of Saros series 125, repeating every 18 years, 11 days, and containing 72 events. The series started with a penumbral lunar eclipse on July 17, 1163. It contains partial eclipses from January 17, 1470 through June 6, 1686; total eclipses from June 17, 1704 through March 19, 2155; and a second set of partial eclipses from March 29, 2173 through June 25, 2317. The series ends at member 72 as a penumbral eclipse on September 9, 2443.

The longest duration of totality was produced by member 37 at 100 minutes, 23 seconds on August 22, 1812. All eclipses in this series occur at the Moon’s descending node of orbit.

Greatest	First			
The greatest eclipse of the series occurred on 1812 Aug 22, lasting 100 minutes, 23 seconds.	Penumbral	Partial	Total	Central
The greatest eclipse of the series occurred on 1812 Aug 22, lasting 100 minutes, 23 seconds.	1163 Jul 17	1470 Jan 17	1704 Jun 17	1758 Jul 20
The greatest eclipse of the series occurred on 1812 Aug 22, lasting 100 minutes, 23 seconds.	Last			
The greatest eclipse of the series occurred on 1812 Aug 22, lasting 100 minutes, 23 seconds.	Central	Total	Partial	Penumbral
The greatest eclipse of the series occurred on 1812 Aug 22, lasting 100 minutes, 23 seconds.	1920 Oct 27	2155 Mar 19	2317 Jun 25	2443 Sep 09

Eclipses are tabulated in three columns; every third eclipse in the same column is one exeligmos apart, so they all cast shadows over approximately the same parts of the Earth.

Series members 37–58 occur between 1801 and 2200:
37	38	39
1812 Aug 22	1830 Sep 02	1848 Sep 13
40	41	42
1866 Sep 24	1884 Oct 04	1902 Oct 17
43	44	45
1920 Oct 27	1938 Nov 07	1956 Nov 18
46	47	48
1974 Nov 29	1992 Dec 09	2010 Dec 21
49	50	51
2028 Dec 31	2047 Jan 12	2065 Jan 22
52	53	54
2083 Feb 02	2101 Feb 14	2119 Feb 25
55	56	57
2137 Mar 07	2155 Mar 19	2173 Mar 29
58
2191 Apr 09

=== Tritos series ===
This eclipse is a part of a tritos cycle, repeating at alternating nodes every 135 synodic months (≈ 3986.63 days, or 11 years minus 1 month). Their appearance and longitude are irregular due to a lack of synchronization with the anomalistic month (period of perigee), but groupings of 3 tritos cycles (≈ 33 years minus 3 months) come close (≈ 434.044 anomalistic months), so eclipses are similar in these groupings.

Series members between 1801 and 2200
1804 Jan 26 (Saros 111)	1814 Dec 26 (Saros 112)	1825 Nov 25 (Saros 113)	1836 Oct 24 (Saros 114)	1847 Sep 24 (Saros 115)
1858 Aug 24 (Saros 116)	1869 Jul 23 (Saros 117)	1880 Jun 22 (Saros 118)	1891 May 23 (Saros 119)	1902 Apr 22 (Saros 120)
1913 Mar 22 (Saros 121)	1924 Feb 20 (Saros 122)	1935 Jan 19 (Saros 123)	1945 Dec 19 (Saros 124)	1956 Nov 18 (Saros 125)
1967 Oct 18 (Saros 126)	1978 Sep 16 (Saros 127)	1989 Aug 17 (Saros 128)	2000 Jul 16 (Saros 129)	2011 Jun 15 (Saros 130)
2022 May 16 (Saros 131)	2033 Apr 14 (Saros 132)	2044 Mar 13 (Saros 133)	2055 Feb 11 (Saros 134)	2066 Jan 11 (Saros 135)
2076 Dec 10 (Saros 136)	2087 Nov 10 (Saros 137)	2098 Oct 10 (Saros 138)	2109 Sep 09 (Saros 139)	2120 Aug 09 (Saros 140)
2131 Jul 10 (Saros 141)	2142 Jun 08 (Saros 142)	2153 May 08 (Saros 143)	2164 Apr 07 (Saros 144)	2175 Mar 07 (Saros 145)
2186 Feb 04 (Saros 146)	2197 Jan 04 (Saros 147)			

=== Inex series ===
This eclipse is a part of the long period inex cycle, repeating at alternating nodes, every 358 synodic months (≈ 10,571.95 days, or 29 years minus 20 days). Their appearance and longitude are irregular due to a lack of synchronization with the anomalistic month (period of perigee). However, groupings of 3 inex cycles (≈ 87 years minus 2 months) comes close (≈ 1,151.02 anomalistic months), so eclipses are similar in these groupings.

Series members between 1801 and 2200
1812 Feb 27 (Saros 120)	1841 Feb 06 (Saros 121)	1870 Jan 17 (Saros 122)
1898 Dec 27 (Saros 123)	1927 Dec 08 (Saros 124)	1956 Nov 18 (Saros 125)
1985 Oct 28 (Saros 126)	2014 Oct 08 (Saros 127)	2043 Sep 19 (Saros 128)
2072 Aug 28 (Saros 129)	2101 Aug 09 (Saros 130)	2130 Jul 21 (Saros 131)
2159 Jun 30 (Saros 132)	2188 Jun 09 (Saros 133)	

=== Half-Saros cycle ===
A lunar eclipse will be preceded and followed by solar eclipses by 9 years and 5.5 days (a half saros). This lunar eclipse is related to two annular solar eclipses of Solar Saros 132.

November 12, 1947	November 23, 1965

== See also ==
- List of lunar eclipses
- List of 20th-century lunar eclipses
