= Solar Saros 132 =

Saros cycle series 132 for solar eclipses

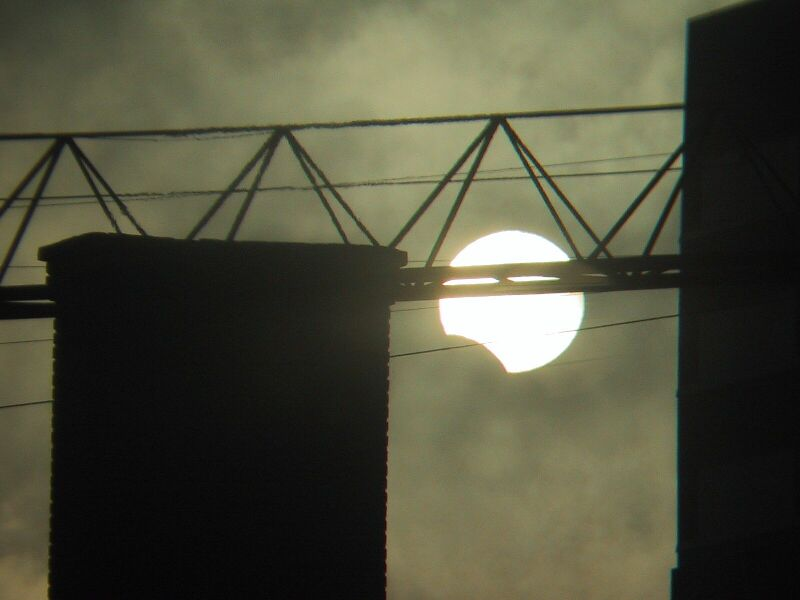
A partial solar eclipse on December 14, 2001, viewed from Minnesota (Saros 132, Member 45)

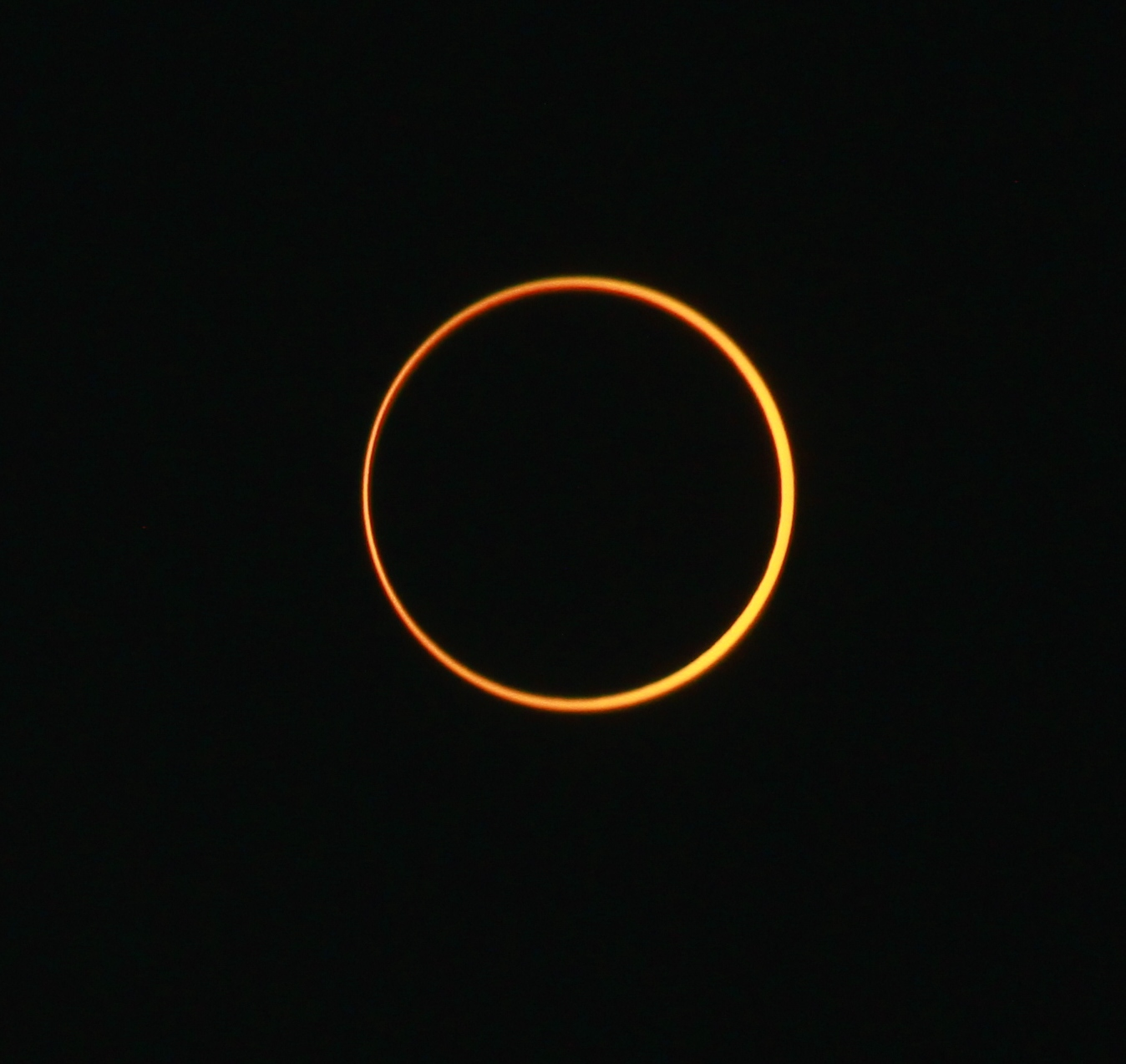
An annular solar eclipse on December 26, 2019, viewed from Nilambur, India (Saros 132, Member 46)

Saros cycle series 132 for solar eclipses occurs at the Moon's descending node, repeating every 18 years, 11 days, containing 71 eclipses, 42 of which are umbral (33 annular, 2 hybrid, 7 total). The first eclipse in the series was on 13 August 1208 and the last eclipse will be on 25 September 2470. The most recent eclipse was an annular eclipse on 26 December 2019 and the next will be an annular eclipse on 5 January 2038.

The longest totality will be 2 minutes 14 seconds on 8 June 2290 and the longest annular was 6 minutes 56 seconds on 9 May 1641.

This solar saros is linked to Lunar Saros 125.

== Umbral eclipses ==
Umbral eclipses (annular, total and hybrid) can be further classified as either: 1) Central (two limits), 2) Central (one limit) or 3) Non-central (one limit).

The statistical distribution of these classes in Saros series 132 appears in the following table.

Classification	Number	Percent
All Umbral eclipses	42	100.00%
Central (two limits)	41	97.62%
Central (one limit)	0	0.00%
Non-central (one limit)	1	2.38%

== All eclipses ==
Note: Dates are given in the Julian calendar prior to 15 October 1582, and in the Gregorian calendar after that.

Saros	Member	Date	Time (Greatest) UTC	Type	Location Lat, Long	Gamma	Mag.	Width (km)	Duration (min:sec)	Ref
132	1	August 13, 1208	8:26:52	Partial	61.7S 8.8W	-1.5227	0.0639			
132	2	August 24, 1226	15:25:45	Partial	61.3S 122.5W	-1.4633	0.1684			
132	3	September 3, 1244	22:31:22	Partial	61S 122.1E	-1.4095	0.2623			
132	4	September 15, 1262	5:45:07	Partial	60.9S 4.9E	-1.3624	0.3436			
132	5	September 25, 1280	13:06:53	Partial	61S 114.4W	-1.3218	0.4131			
132	6	October 6, 1298	20:35:16	Partial	61.2S 124.7E	-1.2867	0.4728			
132	7	October 17, 1316	4:12:33	Partial	61.6S 1.5E	-1.2591	0.5193			
132	8	October 28, 1334	11:56:18	Partial	62.1S 123.4W	-1.237	0.556			
132	9	November 7, 1352	19:47:15	Partial	62.8S 109.7E	-1.2209	0.5826			
132	10	November 19, 1370	3:42:08	Partial	63.6S 18.4W	-1.2082	0.6034			
132	11	November 29, 1388	11:42:20	Partial	64.6S 148.1W	-1.1999	0.617			
132	12	December 10, 1406	19:43:54	Partial	65.6S 81.5E	-1.1928	0.6285			
132	13	December 21, 1424	3:46:29	Partial	66.7S 49.6W	-1.1867	0.6384			
132	14	January 1, 1443	11:47:21	Partial	67.8S 179.2E	-1.1793	0.6506			
132	15	January 11, 1461	19:46:21	Partial	68.9S 47.9E	-1.1705	0.6651			
132	16	January 23, 1479	3:39:45	Partial	69.9S 82.6W	-1.1571	0.6875			
132	17	February 2, 1497	11:27:50	Partial	70.7S 147.5E	-1.1393	0.7176			
132	18	February 13, 1515	19:08:19	Partial	71.5S 18.9E	-1.1153	0.758			
132	19	February 24, 1533	2:42:10	Partial	71.9S 108.5W	-1.086	0.8077			
132	20	March 7, 1551	10:05:18	Partial	72.2S 126.5E	-1.0477	0.873			
132	21	March 17, 1569	17:21:18	Annular (Note: Non-central)	72.1S 3.1E	1.0033	0.9489	-	-	
132	22	April 8, 1587	0:27:05	Annular	60.5S 151.9W	-0.9502	0.9271	889	6m 26s	
132	23	April 18, 1605	7:26:44	Annular	49.8S 89.9E	-0.8918	0.9327	553	6m 43s	
132	24	April 29, 1623	14:16:00	Annular	39.8S 20.4W	-0.8244	0.9378	405	6m 54s	
132	25	May 9, 1641	21:01:19	Annular	30.8S 127.3W	-0.7532	0.9425	321	6m 56s	
132	26	May 21, 1659	3:38:53	Annular	22.2S 129.2E	-0.6747	0.9469	264	6m 51s	
132	27	May 31, 1677	10:13:53	Annular	14.4S 27.5E	-0.5935	0.951	223	6m 36s	
132	28	June 11, 1695	16:44:24	Annular	7.4S 72.2W	-0.5077	0.9545	193	6m 13s	
132	29	June 22, 1713	23:15:39	Annular	1.3S 171.2W	-0.4216	0.9576	170	5m 45s	
132	30	July 4, 1731	5:46:25	Annular	3.8N 90.8E	-0.3341	0.9602	153	5m 15s	
132	31	July 14, 1749	12:19:20	Annular	7.8N 7.2W	-0.2476	0.9623	141	4m 46s	
132	32	July 25, 1767	18:55:48	Annular	10.8N 105.5W	-0.163	0.9638	132	4m 21s	
132	33	August 5, 1785	1:37:22	Annular	12.7N 155.3E	-0.0817	0.965	127	4m 1s	
132	34	August 17, 1803	8:25:03	Annular	13.6N 54.7E	-0.0048	0.9657	124	3m 47s	
132	35	August 27, 1821	15:19:42	Annular	13.6N 47.8W	0.0671	0.9661	123	3m 38s	
132	36	September 7, 1839	22:23:26	Annular	12.8N 152.7W	0.1325	0.9661	123	3m 34s	
132	37	September 18, 1857	5:36:05	Annular	11.6N 100E	0.1912	0.9659	125	3m 34s	
132	38	September 29, 1875	12:58:09	Annular	10N 10.1W	0.2427	0.9656	127	3m 36s	
132	39	October 9, 1893	20:30:22	Annular	8.1N 123W	0.2866	0.9652	130	3m 41s	
132	40	October 22, 1911	4:13:02	Annular	6.3N 121.4E	0.3224	0.965	133	3m 47s	
132	41	November 1, 1929	12:05:10	Annular	4.5N 3.1E	0.3514	0.9649	134	3m 54s	
132	42	November 12, 1947	20:05:37	Annular	3N 117.4W	0.3743	0.965	135	3m 59s	
132	43	November 23, 1965	4:14:51	Annular	1.7N 119.8E	0.3906	0.9656	134	4m 2s	
132	44	December 4, 1983	12:31:15	Annular	0.9N 4.7W	0.4015	0.9666	131	4m 1s	
132	45	December 14, 2001	20:53:01	Annular	0.6N 130.7W	0.4089	0.9681	126	3m 53s	
132	46	December 26, 2019	5:18:53	Annular	1N 102.3E	0.4135	0.9701	118	3m 40s	
132	47	January 5, 2038	13:47:11	Annular	2.1N 25.4W	0.4169	0.9728	107	3m 18s	
132	48	January 16, 2056	22:16:45	Annular	3.9N 153.5W	0.4199	0.9759	95	2m 52s	
132	49	January 27, 2074	6:44:15	Annular	6.6N 78.8E	0.4251	0.9798	79	2m 21s	
132	50	February 7, 2092	15:10:20	Annular	9.9N 48.7W	0.4322	0.984	62	1m 48s	
132	51	February 18, 2110	23:31:35	Annular	14.1N 175.3W	0.4438	0.9888	44	1m 12s	
132	52	March 1, 2128	7:48:32	Annular	18.9N 59.1E	0.4596	0.994	24	0m 37s	
132	53	March 12, 2146	15:58:15	Annular	24.4N 65W	0.4821	0.9995	2	0m 3s	
132	54	March 23, 2164	0:02:47	Hybrid	30.4N 172.1E	0.5095	1.0051	20	0m 29s	
132	55	April 3, 2182	7:59:43	Hybrid	36.9N 51E	0.5439	1.0108	44	0m 58s	
132	56	April 14, 2200	15:49:57	Total	43.8N 68.3W	0.5847	1.0165	69	1m 23s	
132	57	April 25, 2218	23:33:14	Total	51.1N 174.3E	0.6321	1.0219	96	1m 43s	
132	58	May 6, 2236	7:11:03	Total	58.7N 58.9E	0.6848	1.0269	126	1m 59s	
132	59	May 17, 2254	14:43:39	Total	66.7N 54.1W	0.7426	1.0315	160	2m 9s	
132	60	May 27, 2272	22:11:12	Total	75N 163.2W	0.8053	1.0353	202	2m 14s	
132	61	June 8, 2290	5:35:49	Total	83.8N 100.9E	0.8713	1.0382	265	2m 14s	
132	62	June 19, 2308	12:57:53	Total	84.1N 120.6E	0.9402	1.0396	401	2m 8s	
132	63	June 30, 2326	20:18:36	Partial	65.2N 37.3E	1.0107	0.9931			
132	64	July 11, 2344	3:39:15	Partial	64.3N 82.3W	1.0818	0.8591			
132	65	July 22, 2362	11:01:14	Partial	63.5N 157.9E	1.1522	0.7256			
132	66	August 1, 2380	18:26:17	Partial	62.8N 37.7E	1.2207	0.5949			
132	67	August 13, 2398	1:53:37	Partial	62.2N 82.9W	1.2877	0.4669			
132	68	August 23, 2416	9:26:38	Partial	61.8N 155.2E	1.3505	0.3468			
132	69	September 3, 2434	17:04:08	Partial	61.5N 32.2E	1.4099	0.2331			
132	70	September 14, 2452	0:49:17	Partial	61.3N 92.5W	1.4635	0.1307			
132	71	September 25, 2470	8:39:57	Partial	61.3N 141.4E	1.513	0.0365			
