= December 1945 lunar eclipse =

Total lunar eclipse December 19, 1945

- Total eclipse
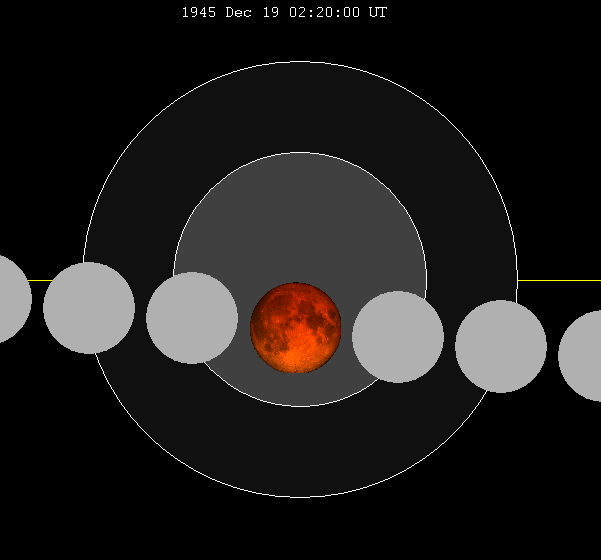
- The Moon's hourly motion shown right to left
- Date: December 19, 1945
- Gamma: −0.2845
- Magnitude: 1.3424
- Saros cycle: 124 (45 of 74)
- Totality: 78 minutes, 53 seconds
- Partiality: 204 minutes, 54 seconds
- Penumbral: 320 minutes, 52 seconds
Contacts (UTC)
- P1: 23:39:56
- U1: 0:37:52
- U2: 1:40:53
- Greatest: 2:20:20
- U3: 2:59:46
- U4: 4:02:46
- P4: 5:00:47

A total lunar eclipse occurred at the Moon’s ascending node of orbit on Wednesday, December 19, 1945, with an umbral magnitude of 1.3424. A lunar eclipse occurs when the Moon moves into the Earth's shadow, causing the Moon to be darkened. A total lunar eclipse occurs when the Moon's near side entirely passes into the Earth's umbral shadow. Unlike a solar eclipse, which can only be viewed from a relatively small area of the world, a lunar eclipse may be viewed from anywhere on the night side of Earth. A total lunar eclipse can last up to nearly two hours, while a total solar eclipse lasts only a few minutes at any given place, because the Moon's shadow is smaller. Occurring about 1.6 days after perigee (on December 17, 1945, at 12:40 UTC), the Moon's apparent diameter was larger.

== Visibility ==
The eclipse was completely visible over much of North and South America, west Africa, Europe, and northern Russia, seen rising over the eastern Pacific Ocean and setting over east and southern Africa and much of Asia.

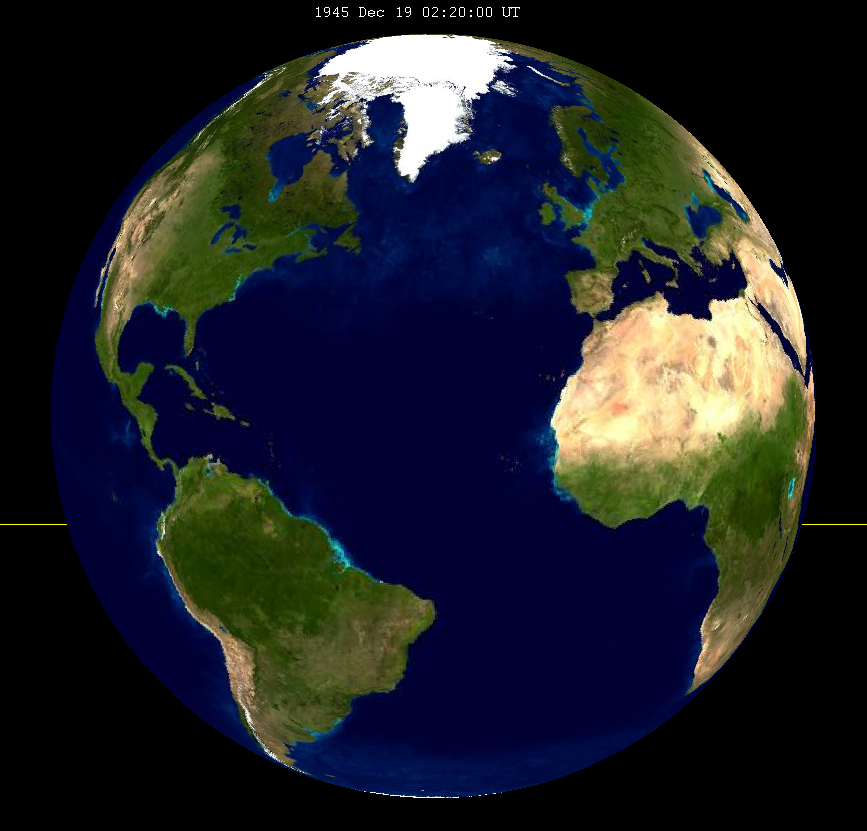
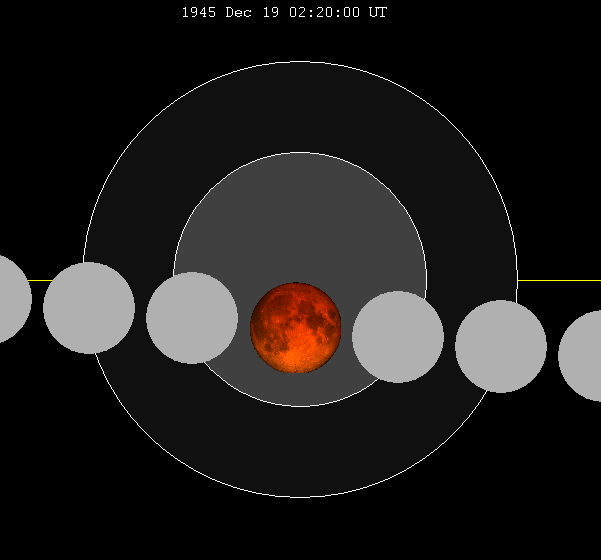

== Eclipse details ==
Shown below is a table displaying details about this particular lunar eclipse. It describes various parameters pertaining to this eclipse.

December 19, 1945 Lunar Eclipse Parameters
Parameter	Value
Penumbral Magnitude	2.32932
Umbral Magnitude	1.34237
Gamma	−0.28453
Sun Right Ascension	17h46m11.1s
Sun Declination	-23°24'29.1"
Sun Semi-Diameter	16'15.4"
Sun Equatorial Horizontal Parallax	08.9"
Moon Right Ascension	05h46m20.2s
Moon Declination	+23°07'25.0"
Moon Semi-Diameter	16'28.3"
Moon Equatorial Horizontal Parallax	1°00'27.1"
ΔT	27.3 s

== Eclipse season ==
This eclipse is part of an eclipse season, a period, roughly every six months, when eclipses occur. Only two (or occasionally three) eclipse seasons occur each year, and each season lasts about 35 days and repeats just short of six months (173 days) later; thus two full eclipse seasons always occur each year. Either two or three eclipses happen each eclipse season. In the sequence below, each eclipse is separated by a fortnight.

Eclipse season of December 1945–January 1946
December 19 Ascending node (full moon)	January 3 Descending node (new moon)
Total lunar eclipse Lunar Saros 124	Partial solar eclipse Solar Saros 150

== Related eclipses ==
=== Eclipses in 1945 ===
- An annular solar eclipse on January 14.
- A partial lunar eclipse on June 25.
- A total solar eclipse on July 9.
- A total lunar eclipse on December 19.

=== Metonic ===
- Preceded by: Lunar eclipse of March 3, 1942
- Followed by: Lunar eclipse of October 7, 1949

=== Tzolkinex ===
- Preceded by: Lunar eclipse of November 7, 1938
- Followed by: Lunar eclipse of January 29, 1953

=== Half-Saros ===
- Preceded by: Solar eclipse of December 13, 1936
- Followed by: Solar eclipse of December 25, 1954

=== Tritos ===
- Preceded by: Lunar eclipse of January 19, 1935
- Followed by: Lunar eclipse of November 18, 1956

=== Lunar Saros 124 ===
- Preceded by: Lunar eclipse of December 8, 1927
- Followed by: Lunar eclipse of December 30, 1963

=== Inex ===
- Preceded by: Lunar eclipse of January 8, 1917
- Followed by: Lunar eclipse of November 29, 1974

=== Triad ===
- Preceded by: Lunar eclipse of February 17, 1859
- Followed by: Lunar eclipse of October 18, 2032

=== Lunar eclipses of 1944–1947 ===
This eclipse is a member of a semester series. An eclipse in a semester series of lunar eclipses repeats approximately every 177 days and 4 hours (a semester) at alternating nodes of the Moon's orbit.

The penumbral lunar eclipses on February 9, 1944 and August 4, 1944 occur in the previous lunar year eclipse set.

Lunar eclipse series sets from 1944 to 1947
Descending node				Ascending node			
Saros	Date Viewing	Type Chart	Gamma	Saros	Date Viewing	Type Chart	Gamma
109	1944 Jul 06	Penumbral	1.2597	114	1944 Dec 29	Penumbral	−1.0115
119	1945 Jun 25	Partial	0.5370	124	1945 Dec 19	Total	−0.2845
129	1946 Jun 14	Total	−0.2324	134	1946 Dec 08	Total	0.3864
139	1947 Jun 03	Partial	−0.9850	144	1947 Nov 28	Penumbral	1.0838

=== Saros 124 ===
This eclipse is a part of Saros series 124, repeating every 18 years, 11 days, and containing 73 events. The series started with a penumbral lunar eclipse on August 17, 1152. It contains partial eclipses from March 21, 1513 through June 15, 1639; total eclipses from June 25, 1657 through April 18, 2144; and a second set of partial eclipses from April 29, 2162 through July 14, 2288. The series ends at member 73 as a penumbral eclipse on October 21, 2450.

The longest duration of totality was produced by member 39 at 101 minutes, 27 seconds on August 30, 1765. All eclipses in this series occur at the Moon’s ascending node of orbit.

Greatest	First			
The greatest eclipse of the series occurred on 1765 Aug 30, lasting 101 minutes, 27 seconds.	Penumbral	Partial	Total	Central
The greatest eclipse of the series occurred on 1765 Aug 30, lasting 101 minutes, 27 seconds.	1152 Aug 17	1513 Mar 21	1657 Jun 25	1711 Jul 29
The greatest eclipse of the series occurred on 1765 Aug 30, lasting 101 minutes, 27 seconds.	Last			
The greatest eclipse of the series occurred on 1765 Aug 30, lasting 101 minutes, 27 seconds.	Central	Total	Partial	Penumbral
The greatest eclipse of the series occurred on 1765 Aug 30, lasting 101 minutes, 27 seconds.	1909 Nov 27	2144 Apr 18	2288 Jul 14	2450 Oct 21

Eclipses are tabulated in three columns; every third eclipse in the same column is one exeligmos apart, so they all cast shadows over approximately the same parts of the Earth.

Series members 37–59 occur between 1801 and 2200:
37	38	39
1801 Sep 22	1819 Oct 03	1837 Oct 13
40	41	42
1855 Oct 25	1873 Nov 04	1891 Nov 16
43	44	45
1909 Nov 27	1927 Dec 08	1945 Dec 19
46	47	48
1963 Dec 30	1982 Jan 09	2000 Jan 21
49	50	51
2018 Jan 31	2036 Feb 11	2054 Feb 22
52	53	54
2072 Mar 04	2090 Mar 15	2108 Mar 27
55	56	57
2126 Apr 07	2144 Apr 18	2162 Apr 29
58	59	
2180 May 09	2198 May 20	

=== Tritos series ===
This eclipse is a part of a tritos cycle, repeating at alternating nodes every 135 synodic months (≈ 3986.63 days, or 11 years minus 1 month). Their appearance and longitude are irregular due to a lack of synchronization with the anomalistic month (period of perigee), but groupings of 3 tritos cycles (≈ 33 years minus 3 months) come close (≈ 434.044 anomalistic months), so eclipses are similar in these groupings.

Series members between 1801 and 2200
1804 Jan 26 (Saros 111)	1814 Dec 26 (Saros 112)	1825 Nov 25 (Saros 113)	1836 Oct 24 (Saros 114)	1847 Sep 24 (Saros 115)
1858 Aug 24 (Saros 116)	1869 Jul 23 (Saros 117)	1880 Jun 22 (Saros 118)	1891 May 23 (Saros 119)	1902 Apr 22 (Saros 120)
1913 Mar 22 (Saros 121)	1924 Feb 20 (Saros 122)	1935 Jan 19 (Saros 123)	1945 Dec 19 (Saros 124)	1956 Nov 18 (Saros 125)
1967 Oct 18 (Saros 126)	1978 Sep 16 (Saros 127)	1989 Aug 17 (Saros 128)	2000 Jul 16 (Saros 129)	2011 Jun 15 (Saros 130)
2022 May 16 (Saros 131)	2033 Apr 14 (Saros 132)	2044 Mar 13 (Saros 133)	2055 Feb 11 (Saros 134)	2066 Jan 11 (Saros 135)
2076 Dec 10 (Saros 136)	2087 Nov 10 (Saros 137)	2098 Oct 10 (Saros 138)	2109 Sep 09 (Saros 139)	2120 Aug 09 (Saros 140)
2131 Jul 10 (Saros 141)	2142 Jun 08 (Saros 142)	2153 May 08 (Saros 143)	2164 Apr 07 (Saros 144)	2175 Mar 07 (Saros 145)
2186 Feb 04 (Saros 146)	2197 Jan 04 (Saros 147)			

=== Inex series ===
This eclipse is a part of the long period inex cycle, repeating at alternating nodes, every 358 synodic months (≈ 10,571.95 days, or 29 years minus 20 days). Their appearance and longitude are irregular due to a lack of synchronization with the anomalistic month (period of perigee). However, groupings of 3 inex cycles (≈ 87 years minus 2 months) comes close (≈ 1,151.02 anomalistic months), so eclipses are similar in these groupings.

Series members between 1801 and 2200
1801 Mar 30 (Saros 119)	1830 Mar 09 (Saros 120)	1859 Feb 17 (Saros 121)
1888 Jan 28 (Saros 122)	1917 Jan 08 (Saros 123)	1945 Dec 19 (Saros 124)
1974 Nov 29 (Saros 125)	2003 Nov 09 (Saros 126)	2032 Oct 18 (Saros 127)
2061 Sep 29 (Saros 128)	2090 Sep 08 (Saros 129)	2119 Aug 20 (Saros 130)
2148 Jul 31 (Saros 131)	2177 Jul 11 (Saros 132)	

=== Half-Saros cycle ===
A lunar eclipse will be preceded and followed by solar eclipses by 9 years and 5.5 days (a half saros). This lunar eclipse is related to two total solar eclipses of Solar Saros 131.

December 13, 1936	December 25, 1954

== See also ==
- List of lunar eclipses
- List of 20th-century lunar eclipses
