= February 2036 lunar eclipse =

Astronomical event

- Total eclipse
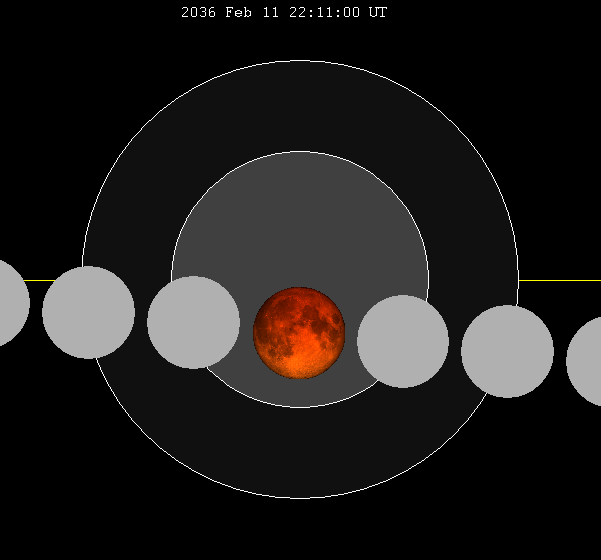
- The Moon's hourly motion shown right to left
- Date: February 11, 2036
- Gamma: −0.3110
- Magnitude: 1.3007
- Saros cycle: 124 (50 of 74)
- Totality: 72 minutes, 8 seconds
- Partiality: 200 minutes, 53 seconds
- Penumbral: 314 minutes, 45 seconds
Contacts (UTC)
- P1: 19:35:03
- U1: 20:32:09
- U2: 21:35:51
- Greatest: 22:13:06
- U3: 22:50:21
- U4: 23:54:03
- P4: 0:51:09

A total lunar eclipse will occur at the Moon’s ascending node of orbit on Monday, February 11, 2036, with an umbral magnitude of 1.3007. A lunar eclipse occurs when the Moon moves into the Earth's shadow, causing the Moon to be darkened. A total lunar eclipse occurs when the Moon's near side entirely passes into the Earth's umbral shadow. Unlike a solar eclipse, which can only be viewed from a relatively small area of the world, a lunar eclipse may be viewed from anywhere on the night side of Earth. A total lunar eclipse can last up to nearly two hours, while a total solar eclipse lasts only a few minutes at any given place, because the Moon's shadow is smaller. Occurring about 1.2 days after perigee (on February 10, 2036, at 16:00 UTC), the Moon's apparent diameter will be larger.

== Visibility ==
The eclipse will be completely visible over Africa, Europe, and west, central, and south Asia, seen rising over much of North and South America and setting over east Asia and Australia.

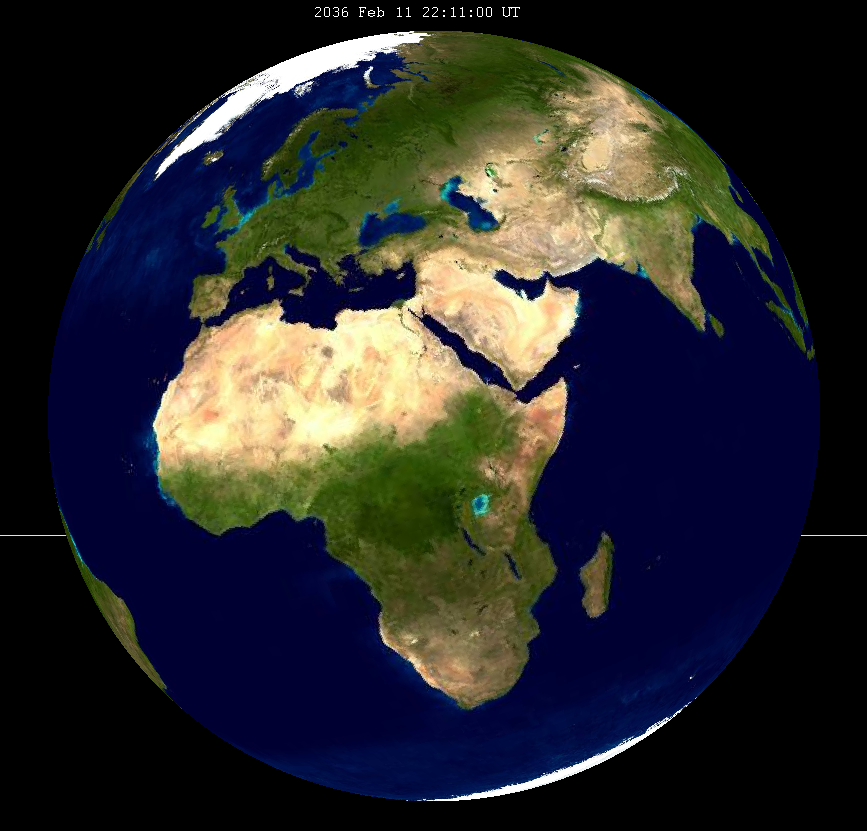
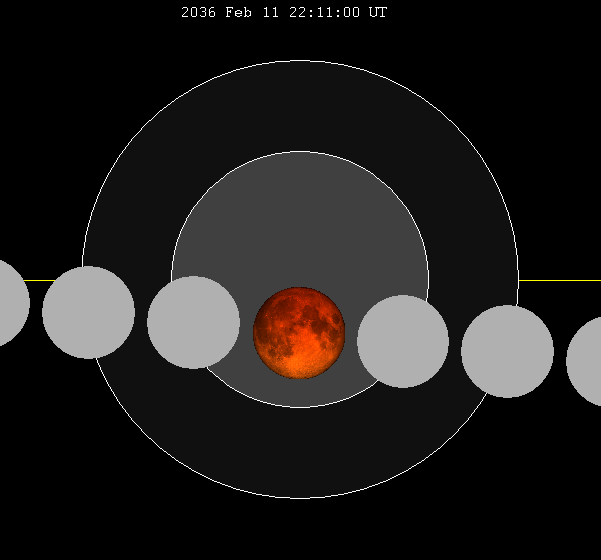

== Eclipse details ==
Shown below is a table displaying details about this particular solar eclipse. It describes various parameters pertaining to this eclipse.

February 11, 2036 Lunar Eclipse Parameters
Parameter	Value
Penumbral Magnitude	2.27624
Umbral Magnitude	1.30065
Gamma	−0.31098
Sun Right Ascension	21h40m25.4s
Sun Declination	-13°55'30.0"
Sun Semi-Diameter	16'12.3"
Sun Equatorial Horizontal Parallax	08.9"
Moon Right Ascension	09h40m07.3s
Moon Declination	+13°37'03.4"
Moon Semi-Diameter	16'36.7"
Moon Equatorial Horizontal Parallax	1°00'57.8"
ΔT	77.0 s

== Eclipse season ==
This eclipse is part of an eclipse season, a period, roughly every six months, when eclipses occur. Only two (or occasionally three) eclipse seasons occur each year, and each season lasts about 35 days and repeats just short of six months (173 days) later; thus two full eclipse seasons always occur each year. Either two or three eclipses happen each eclipse season. In the sequence below, each eclipse is separated by a fortnight.

Eclipse season of February 2036
February 11 Ascending node (full moon)	February 27 Descending node (new moon)
Total lunar eclipse Lunar Saros 124	Partial solar eclipse Solar Saros 150

== Related eclipses ==
=== Eclipses in 2036 ===
- A total lunar eclipse on February 11.
- A partial solar eclipse on February 27.
- A partial solar eclipse on July 23.
- A total lunar eclipse on August 7.
- A partial solar eclipse on August 21.

=== Metonic ===
- Preceded by: Lunar eclipse of April 25, 2032
- Followed by: Lunar eclipse of November 30, 2039

=== Tzolkinex ===
- Preceded by: Lunar eclipse of December 31, 2028
- Followed by: Lunar eclipse of March 25, 2043

=== Half-Saros ===
- Preceded by: Solar eclipse of February 6, 2027
- Followed by: Solar eclipse of February 16, 2045

=== Tritos ===
- Preceded by: Lunar eclipse of March 14, 2025
- Followed by: Lunar eclipse of January 12, 2047

=== Lunar Saros 124 ===
- Preceded by: Lunar eclipse of January 31, 2018
- Followed by: Lunar eclipse of February 22, 2054

=== Inex ===
- Preceded by: Lunar eclipse of March 3, 2007
- Followed by: Lunar eclipse of January 22, 2065

=== Triad ===
- Preceded by: Lunar eclipse of April 13, 1949
- Followed by: Lunar eclipse of December 13, 2122

=== Lunar eclipses of 2035–2038 ===
This eclipse is a member of a semester series. An eclipse in a semester series of lunar eclipses repeats approximately every 177 days and 4 hours (a semester) at alternating nodes of the Moon's orbit.

The penumbral lunar eclipses on June 17, 2038 and December 11, 2038 occur in the next lunar year eclipse set.

Lunar eclipse series sets from 2035 to 2038
Ascending node				Descending node			
Saros	Date Viewing	Type Chart	Gamma	Saros	Date Viewing	Type Chart	Gamma
114	2035 Feb 22	Penumbral	−1.0357	119	2035 Aug 19	Partial	0.9433
124	2036 Feb 11	Total	−0.3110	129	2036 Aug 07	Total	0.2004
134	2037 Jan 31	Total	0.3619	139	2037 Jul 27	Partial	−0.5582
144	2038 Jan 21	Penumbral	1.0710	149	2038 Jul 16	Penumbral	−1.2837

=== Saros 124 ===
This eclipse is a part of Saros series 124, repeating every 18 years, 11 days, and containing 73 events. The series started with a penumbral lunar eclipse on August 17, 1152. It contains partial eclipses from March 21, 1513 through June 15, 1639; total eclipses from June 25, 1657 through April 18, 2144; and a second set of partial eclipses from April 29, 2162 through July 14, 2288. The series ends at member 73 as a penumbral eclipse on October 21, 2450.

The longest duration of totality was produced by member 39 at 101 minutes, 27 seconds on August 30, 1765. All eclipses in this series occur at the Moon’s ascending node of orbit.

Greatest	First			
The greatest eclipse of the series occurred on 1765 Aug 30, lasting 101 minutes, 27 seconds.	Penumbral	Partial	Total	Central
The greatest eclipse of the series occurred on 1765 Aug 30, lasting 101 minutes, 27 seconds.	1152 Aug 17	1513 Mar 21	1657 Jun 25	1711 Jul 29
The greatest eclipse of the series occurred on 1765 Aug 30, lasting 101 minutes, 27 seconds.	Last			
The greatest eclipse of the series occurred on 1765 Aug 30, lasting 101 minutes, 27 seconds.	Central	Total	Partial	Penumbral
The greatest eclipse of the series occurred on 1765 Aug 30, lasting 101 minutes, 27 seconds.	1909 Nov 27	2144 Apr 18	2288 Jul 14	2450 Oct 21

Eclipses are tabulated in three columns; every third eclipse in the same column is one exeligmos apart, so they all cast shadows over approximately the same parts of the Earth.

Series members 37–59 occur between 1801 and 2200:
37	38	39
1801 Sep 22	1819 Oct 03	1837 Oct 13
40	41	42
1855 Oct 25	1873 Nov 04	1891 Nov 16
43	44	45
1909 Nov 27	1927 Dec 08	1945 Dec 19
46	47	48
1963 Dec 30	1982 Jan 09	2000 Jan 21
49	50	51
2018 Jan 31	2036 Feb 11	2054 Feb 22
52	53	54
2072 Mar 04	2090 Mar 15	2108 Mar 27
55	56	57
2126 Apr 07	2144 Apr 18	2162 Apr 29
58	59	
2180 May 09	2198 May 20	

=== Tritos series ===
This eclipse is a part of a tritos cycle, repeating at alternating nodes every 135 synodic months (≈ 3986.63 days, or 11 years minus 1 month). Their appearance and longitude are irregular due to a lack of synchronization with the anomalistic month (period of perigee), but groupings of 3 tritos cycles (≈ 33 years minus 3 months) come close (≈ 434.044 anomalistic months), so eclipses are similar in these groupings.

Series members between 1801 and 2200
1806 Nov 26 (Saros 103)		1828 Sep 23 (Saros 105)	1839 Aug 24 (Saros 106)	1850 Jul 24 (Saros 107)
1861 Jun 22 (Saros 108)	1872 May 22 (Saros 109)	1883 Apr 22 (Saros 110)	1894 Mar 21 (Saros 111)	1905 Feb 19 (Saros 112)
1916 Jan 20 (Saros 113)	1926 Dec 19 (Saros 114)	1937 Nov 18 (Saros 115)	1948 Oct 18 (Saros 116)	1959 Sep 17 (Saros 117)
1970 Aug 17 (Saros 118)	1981 Jul 17 (Saros 119)	1992 Jun 15 (Saros 120)	2003 May 16 (Saros 121)	2014 Apr 15 (Saros 122)
2025 Mar 14 (Saros 123)	2036 Feb 11 (Saros 124)	2047 Jan 12 (Saros 125)	2057 Dec 11 (Saros 126)	2068 Nov 09 (Saros 127)
2079 Oct 10 (Saros 128)	2090 Sep 08 (Saros 129)	2101 Aug 09 (Saros 130)	2112 Jul 09 (Saros 131)	2123 Jun 09 (Saros 132)
2134 May 08 (Saros 133)	2145 Apr 07 (Saros 134)	2156 Mar 07 (Saros 135)	2167 Feb 04 (Saros 136)	2178 Jan 04 (Saros 137)
2188 Dec 04 (Saros 138)	2199 Nov 02 (Saros 139)			

=== Inex series ===
This eclipse is a part of the long period inex cycle, repeating at alternating nodes, every 358 synodic months (≈ 10,571.95 days, or 29 years minus 20 days). Their appearance and longitude are irregular due to a lack of synchronization with the anomalistic month (period of perigee). However, groupings of 3 inex cycles (≈ 87 years minus 2 months) comes close (≈ 1,151.02 anomalistic months), so eclipses are similar in these groupings.

Series members between 1801 and 2200
1804 Jul 22 (Saros 116)	1833 Jul 02 (Saros 117)	1862 Jun 12 (Saros 118)
1891 May 23 (Saros 119)	1920 May 03 (Saros 120)	1949 Apr 13 (Saros 121)
1978 Mar 24 (Saros 122)	2007 Mar 03 (Saros 123)	2036 Feb 11 (Saros 124)
2065 Jan 22 (Saros 125)	2094 Jan 01 (Saros 126)	2122 Dec 13 (Saros 127)
2151 Nov 24 (Saros 128)	2180 Nov 02 (Saros 129)	

=== Half-Saros cycle ===
A lunar eclipse will be preceded and followed by solar eclipses by 9 years and 5.5 days (a half saros). This lunar eclipse is related to two total solar eclipses of Solar Saros 131.

February 6, 2027	February 16, 2045

== See also ==
- List of lunar eclipses and List of 21st-century lunar eclipses
