= December 1963 lunar eclipse =

Total lunar eclipse December 30, 1963

- Total eclipse
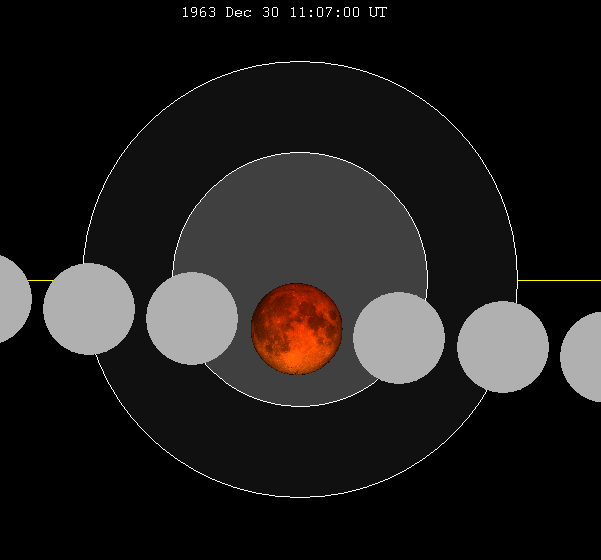
- The Moon's hourly motion shown right to left
- Date: December 30, 1963
- Gamma: −0.2889
- Magnitude: 1.3350
- Saros cycle: 124 (46 of 74)
- Totality: 78 minutes, 7 seconds
- Partiality: 204 minutes, 18 seconds
- Penumbral: 319 minutes, 57 seconds
Contacts (UTC)
- P1: 8:26:53
- U1: 9:24:40
- U2: 10:27:46
- Greatest: 11:06:50
- U3: 11:45:53
- U4: 12:48:58
- P4: 13:46:50

A total lunar eclipse occurred at the Moon’s ascending node of orbit on Monday, December 30, 1963, with an umbral magnitude of 1.3350. A lunar eclipse occurs when the Moon moves into the Earth's shadow, causing the Moon to be darkened. A total lunar eclipse occurs when the Moon's near side entirely passes into the Earth's umbral shadow. Unlike a solar eclipse, which can only be viewed from a relatively small area of the world, a lunar eclipse may be viewed from anywhere on the night side of Earth. A total lunar eclipse can last up to nearly two hours, while a total solar eclipse lasts only a few minutes at any given place, because the Moon's shadow is smaller. Occurring about 1.5 days after perigee (on December 29, 1963, at 0:10 UTC), the Moon's apparent diameter was larger.

== Visibility ==
The eclipse was completely visible over northeast Asia and much of North America, seen rising over much of Asia and Australia and setting over eastern North America and South America.

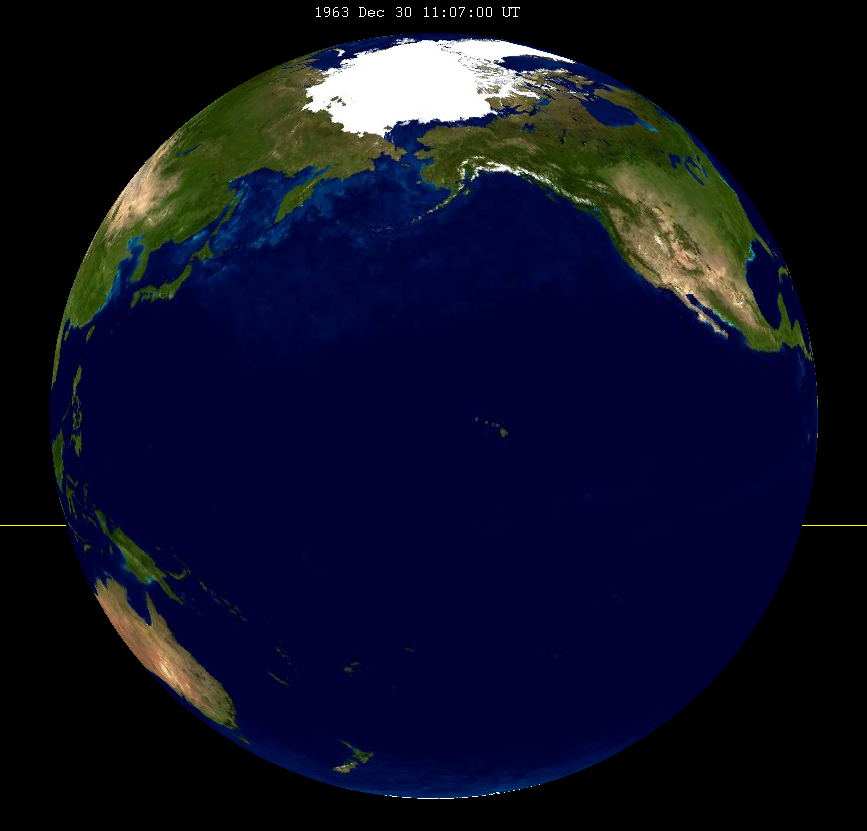
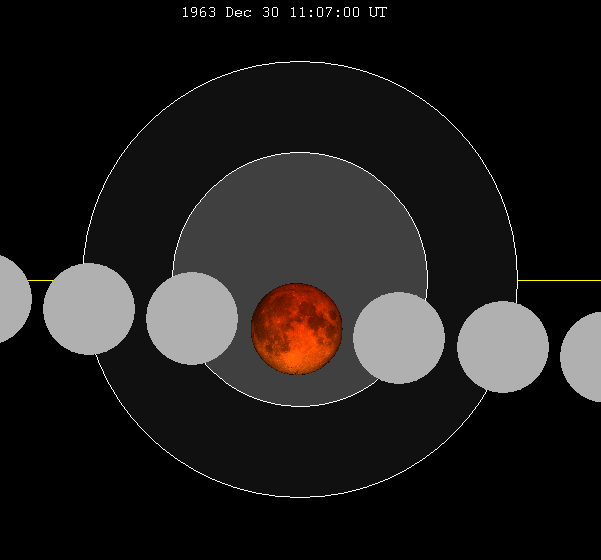

== Eclipse details ==
Shown below is a table displaying details about this particular lunar eclipse. It describes various parameters pertaining to this eclipse.

December 30, 1963 Lunar Eclipse Parameters
Parameter	Value
Penumbral Magnitude	2.32062
Umbral Magnitude	1.33504
Gamma	−0.28889
Sun Right Ascension	18h34m56.9s
Sun Declination	-23°12'00.5"
Sun Semi-Diameter	16'15.9"
Sun Equatorial Horizontal Parallax	08.9"
Moon Right Ascension	06h34m59.9s
Moon Declination	+22°54'31.5"
Moon Semi-Diameter	16'30.2"
Moon Equatorial Horizontal Parallax	1°00'34.1"
ΔT	35.1 s

== Eclipse season ==
This eclipse is part of an eclipse season, a period, roughly every six months, when eclipses occur. Only two (or occasionally three) eclipse seasons occur each year, and each season lasts about 35 days and repeats just short of six months (173 days) later; thus two full eclipse seasons always occur each year. Either two or three eclipses happen each eclipse season. In the sequence below, each eclipse is separated by a fortnight.

Eclipse season of December 1963–January 1964
December 30 Ascending node (full moon)	January 14 Descending node (new moon)
Total lunar eclipse Lunar Saros 124	Partial solar eclipse Solar Saros 150

== Related eclipses ==
=== Eclipses in 1963 ===
- A penumbral lunar eclipse on January 9.
- An annular solar eclipse on January 25.
- A partial lunar eclipse on July 6.
- A total solar eclipse on July 20.
- A total lunar eclipse on December 30.

=== Metonic ===
- Preceded by: Lunar eclipse of March 13, 1960
- Followed by: Lunar eclipse of October 18, 1967

=== Tzolkinex ===
- Preceded by: Lunar eclipse of November 18, 1956
- Followed by: Lunar eclipse of February 10, 1971

=== Half-Saros ===
- Preceded by: Solar eclipse of December 25, 1954
- Followed by: Solar eclipse of January 4, 1973

=== Tritos ===
- Preceded by: Lunar eclipse of January 29, 1953
- Followed by: Lunar eclipse of November 29, 1974

=== Lunar Saros 124 ===
- Preceded by: Lunar eclipse of December 19, 1945
- Followed by: Lunar eclipse of January 9, 1982

=== Inex ===
- Preceded by: Lunar eclipse of January 19, 1935
- Followed by: Lunar eclipse of December 9, 1992

=== Triad ===
- Preceded by: Lunar eclipse of February 27, 1877
- Followed by: Lunar eclipse of October 30, 2050

=== Lunar eclipses of 1962–1965 ===
This eclipse is a member of a semester series. An eclipse in a semester series of lunar eclipses repeats approximately every 177 days and 4 hours (a semester) at alternating nodes of the Moon's orbit.

The penumbral lunar eclipses on February 19, 1962 and August 15, 1962 occur in the previous lunar year eclipse set.

Lunar eclipse series sets from 1962 to 1965
Descending node				Ascending node			
Saros	Date Viewing	Type Chart	Gamma	Saros	Date Viewing	Type Chart	Gamma
109	1962 Jul 17	Penumbral	1.3371	114	1963 Jan 09	Penumbral	−1.0128
119	1963 Jul 06	Partial	0.6197	124	1963 Dec 30	Total	−0.2889
129	1964 Jun 25	Total	−0.1461	134	1964 Dec 19	Total	0.3801
139	1965 Jun 14	Partial	−0.9006	144	1965 Dec 08	Penumbral	1.0775

=== Saros 124 ===
This eclipse is a part of Saros series 124, repeating every 18 years, 11 days, and containing 73 events. The series started with a penumbral lunar eclipse on August 17, 1152. It contains partial eclipses from March 21, 1513 through June 15, 1639; total eclipses from June 25, 1657 through April 18, 2144; and a second set of partial eclipses from April 29, 2162 through July 14, 2288. The series ends at member 73 as a penumbral eclipse on October 21, 2450.

The longest duration of totality was produced by member 39 at 101 minutes, 27 seconds on August 30, 1765. All eclipses in this series occur at the Moon’s ascending node of orbit.

Greatest	First			
The greatest eclipse of the series occurred on 1765 Aug 30, lasting 101 minutes, 27 seconds.	Penumbral	Partial	Total	Central
The greatest eclipse of the series occurred on 1765 Aug 30, lasting 101 minutes, 27 seconds.	1152 Aug 17	1513 Mar 21	1657 Jun 25	1711 Jul 29
The greatest eclipse of the series occurred on 1765 Aug 30, lasting 101 minutes, 27 seconds.	Last			
The greatest eclipse of the series occurred on 1765 Aug 30, lasting 101 minutes, 27 seconds.	Central	Total	Partial	Penumbral
The greatest eclipse of the series occurred on 1765 Aug 30, lasting 101 minutes, 27 seconds.	1909 Nov 27	2144 Apr 18	2288 Jul 14	2450 Oct 21

Eclipses are tabulated in three columns; every third eclipse in the same column is one exeligmos apart, so they all cast shadows over approximately the same parts of the Earth.

Series members 37–59 occur between 1801 and 2200:
37	38	39
1801 Sep 22	1819 Oct 03	1837 Oct 13
40	41	42
1855 Oct 25	1873 Nov 04	1891 Nov 16
43	44	45
1909 Nov 27	1927 Dec 08	1945 Dec 19
46	47	48
1963 Dec 30	1982 Jan 09	2000 Jan 21
49	50	51
2018 Jan 31	2036 Feb 11	2054 Feb 22
52	53	54
2072 Mar 04	2090 Mar 15	2108 Mar 27
55	56	57
2126 Apr 07	2144 Apr 18	2162 Apr 29
58	59	
2180 May 09	2198 May 20	

=== Tritos series ===
This eclipse is a part of a tritos cycle, repeating at alternating nodes every 135 synodic months (≈ 3986.63 days, or 11 years minus 1 month). Their appearance and longitude are irregular due to a lack of synchronization with the anomalistic month (period of perigee), but groupings of 3 tritos cycles (≈ 33 years minus 3 months) come close (≈ 434.044 anomalistic months), so eclipses are similar in these groupings.

Series members between 1801 and 2200
1811 Mar 10 (Saros 110)	1822 Feb 06 (Saros 111)	1833 Jan 06 (Saros 112)	1843 Dec 07 (Saros 113)	1854 Nov 04 (Saros 114)
1865 Oct 04 (Saros 115)	1876 Sep 03 (Saros 116)	1887 Aug 03 (Saros 117)	1898 Jul 03 (Saros 118)	1909 Jun 04 (Saros 119)
1920 May 03 (Saros 120)	1931 Apr 02 (Saros 121)	1942 Mar 03 (Saros 122)	1953 Jan 29 (Saros 123)	1963 Dec 30 (Saros 124)
1974 Nov 29 (Saros 125)	1985 Oct 28 (Saros 126)	1996 Sep 27 (Saros 127)	2007 Aug 28 (Saros 128)	2018 Jul 27 (Saros 129)
2029 Jun 26 (Saros 130)	2040 May 26 (Saros 131)	2051 Apr 26 (Saros 132)	2062 Mar 25 (Saros 133)	2073 Feb 22 (Saros 134)
2084 Jan 22 (Saros 135)	2094 Dec 21 (Saros 136)	2105 Nov 21 (Saros 137)	2116 Oct 21 (Saros 138)	2127 Sep 20 (Saros 139)
2138 Aug 20 (Saros 140)	2149 Jul 20 (Saros 141)	2160 Jun 18 (Saros 142)	2171 May 19 (Saros 143)	2182 Apr 18 (Saros 144)
2193 Mar 17 (Saros 145)

=== Inex series ===
This eclipse is a part of the long period inex cycle, repeating at alternating nodes, every 358 synodic months (≈ 10,571.95 days, or 29 years minus 20 days). Their appearance and longitude are irregular due to a lack of synchronization with the anomalistic month (period of perigee). However, groupings of 3 inex cycles (≈ 87 years minus 2 months) comes close (≈ 1,151.02 anomalistic months), so eclipses are similar in these groupings.

Series members between 1801 and 2200
1819 Apr 10 (Saros 119)	1848 Mar 19 (Saros 120)	1877 Feb 27 (Saros 121)
1906 Feb 09 (Saros 122)	1935 Jan 19 (Saros 123)	1963 Dec 30 (Saros 124)
1992 Dec 09 (Saros 125)	2021 Nov 19 (Saros 126)	2050 Oct 30 (Saros 127)
2079 Oct 10 (Saros 128)	2108 Sep 20 (Saros 129)	2137 Aug 30 (Saros 130)
2166 Aug 11 (Saros 131)	2195 Jul 22 (Saros 132)	

=== Half-Saros cycle ===
A lunar eclipse will be preceded and followed by solar eclipses by 9 years and 5.5 days (a half saros). This lunar eclipse is related to two total solar eclipses of Solar Saros 131.

December 25, 1954	January 4, 1973

== See also ==
- List of lunar eclipses
- List of 20th-century lunar eclipses
