= January 2000 lunar eclipse =

Total lunar eclipse of 21 January 2000

- Total eclipse
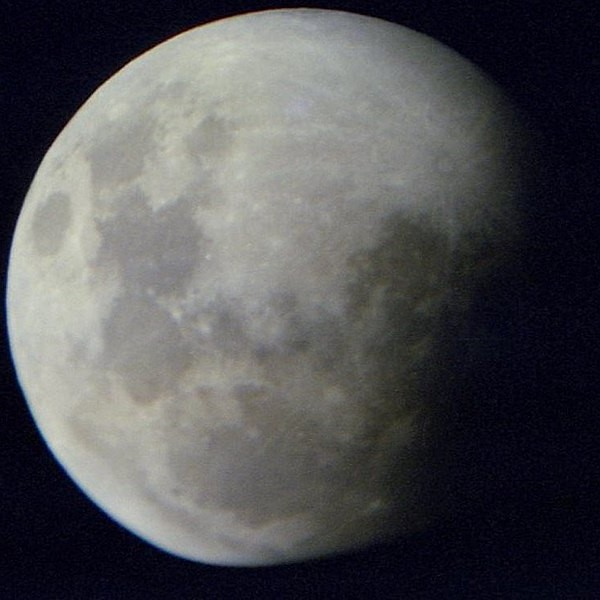
- Partial from Buenos Aires, 3:20 UTC
- Date: January 21, 2000
- Gamma: −0.2957
- Magnitude: 1.3246
- Saros cycle: 124 (48 of 74)
- Totality: 76 minutes, 59 seconds
- Partiality: 203 minutes, 19 seconds
- Penumbral: 318 minutes, 12 seconds
Contacts (UTC)
- P1: 02:04:26
- U1: 03:01:50
- U2: 04:05:01
- Greatest: 04:43:31
- U3: 05:22:00
- U4: 06:25:09
- P4: 07:22:38

A total lunar eclipse occurred at the Moon’s ascending node of orbit on Friday, January 21, 2000, with an umbral magnitude of 1.3246. A lunar eclipse occurs when the Moon moves into the Earth's shadow, causing the Moon to be darkened. A total lunar eclipse occurs when the Moon's near side entirely passes into the Earth's umbral shadow. Unlike a solar eclipse, which can only be viewed from a relatively small area of the world, a lunar eclipse may be viewed from anywhere on the night side of Earth. A total lunar eclipse can last up to nearly two hours, while a total solar eclipse lasts only a few minutes at any given place, because the Moon's shadow is smaller. Occurring about 1.5 days after perigee (on January 19, 2000, at 17:50 UTC), the Moon's apparent diameter was larger.

== Visibility ==
The eclipse was completely visible over most of North America, South America, and western Europe, seen rising over the Pacific Ocean and setting over Africa, Europe, and west Asia.

| Hourly motion shown right to left |

== Eclipse details ==
Shown below is a table displaying details about this particular lunar eclipse. It describes various parameters pertaining to this eclipse.

January 21, 2000 Lunar Eclipse Parameters
| Parameter | Value |
|---|---|
| Penumbral Magnitude | 2.30601 |
| Umbral Magnitude | 1.32459 |
| Gamma | −0.29571 |
| Sun Right Ascension | 20h10m32.9s |
| Sun Declination | -20°03'20.2" |
| Sun Semi-Diameter | 16'15.2" |
| Sun Equatorial Horizontal Parallax | 08.9" |
| Moon Right Ascension | 08h10m24.0s |
| Moon Declination | +19°45'29.3" |
| Moon Semi-Diameter | 16'33.7" |
| Moon Equatorial Horizontal Parallax | 1°00'46.8" |
| ΔT | 63.8 s |

== Eclipse season ==
This eclipse is part of an eclipse season, a period, roughly every six months, when eclipses occur. Only two (or occasionally three) eclipse seasons occur each year, and each season lasts about 35 days and repeats just short of six months (173 days) later; thus two full eclipse seasons always occur each year. Either two or three eclipses happen each eclipse season. In the sequence below, each eclipse is separated by a fortnight.

Eclipse season of January–February 2000
| January 21 Ascending node (full moon) | February 5 Descending node (new moon) |
|---|---|
| Total lunar eclipse Lunar Saros 124 | Partial solar eclipse Solar Saros 150 |

== Related eclipses ==
=== Eclipses in 2000 ===
- A total lunar eclipse on January 21.
- A partial solar eclipse on February 5.
- A partial solar eclipse on July 1.
- A total lunar eclipse on July 16.
- A partial solar eclipse on July 31.
- A partial solar eclipse on December 25.

=== Metonic ===
- Preceded by: Lunar eclipse of April 4, 1996
- Followed by: Lunar eclipse of November 9, 2003

=== Tzolkinex ===
- Preceded by: Lunar eclipse of December 9, 1992
- Followed by: Lunar eclipse of March 3, 2007

=== Half-Saros ===
- Preceded by: Solar eclipse of January 15, 1991
- Followed by: Solar eclipse of January 26, 2009

=== Tritos ===
- Preceded by: Lunar eclipse of February 20, 1989
- Followed by: Lunar eclipse of December 21, 2010

=== Lunar Saros 124 ===
- Preceded by: Lunar eclipse of January 9, 1982
- Followed by: Lunar eclipse of January 31, 2018

=== Inex ===
- Preceded by: Lunar eclipse of February 10, 1971
- Followed by: Lunar eclipse of December 31, 2028

=== Triad ===
- Preceded by: Lunar eclipse of March 22, 1913
- Followed by: Lunar eclipse of November 20, 2086

=== Lunar eclipses of 1998–2002 ===
This eclipse is a member of a semester series. An eclipse in a semester series of lunar eclipses repeats approximately every 177 days and 4 hours (a semester) at alternating nodes of the Moon's orbit.

The penumbral lunar eclipses on March 13, 1998 and September 6, 1998 occur in the previous lunar year eclipse set, and the penumbral lunar eclipses on May 26, 2002 and November 20, 2002 occur in the next lunar year eclipse set.

Lunar eclipse series sets from 1998 to 2002
| Descending node | | | | Ascending node | | | |
| Saros | Date Viewing | Type Chart | Gamma | Saros | Date Viewing | Type Chart | Gamma |
| 109 | 1998 Aug 08 | Penumbral | 1.4876 | 114 | 1999 Jan 31 | Penumbral | −1.0190 |
| 119 | 1999 Jul 28 | Partial | 0.7863 | 124 | 2000 Jan 21 | Total | −0.2957 |
| 129 | 2000 Jul 16 | Total | 0.0302 | 134 | 2001 Jan 09 | Total | 0.3720 |
| 139 | 2001 Jul 05 | Partial | −0.7287 | 144 | 2001 Dec 30 | Penumbral | 1.0732 |
| 149 | 2002 Jun 24 | Penumbral | −1.4440 | | | | |

=== Saros 124 ===
This eclipse is a part of Saros series 124, repeating every 18 years, 11 days, and containing 73 events. The series started with a penumbral lunar eclipse on August 17, 1152. It contains partial eclipses from March 21, 1513 through June 15, 1639; total eclipses from June 25, 1657 through April 18, 2144; and a second set of partial eclipses from April 29, 2162 through July 14, 2288. The series ends at member 73 as a penumbral eclipse on October 21, 2450.

The longest duration of totality was produced by member 39 at 101 minutes, 27 seconds on August 30, 1765. All eclipses in this series occur at the Moon’s ascending node of orbit.

| Greatest | First | | | |
|---|---|---|---|---|
| The greatest eclipse of the series occurred on 1765 Aug 30, lasting 101 minutes, 27 seconds. | Penumbral | Partial | Total | Central |
| The greatest eclipse of the series occurred on 1765 Aug 30, lasting 101 minutes, 27 seconds. | 1152 Aug 17 | 1513 Mar 21 | 1657 Jun 25 | 1711 Jul 29 |
| The greatest eclipse of the series occurred on 1765 Aug 30, lasting 101 minutes, 27 seconds. | Last | | | |
| The greatest eclipse of the series occurred on 1765 Aug 30, lasting 101 minutes, 27 seconds. | Central | Total | Partial | Penumbral |
| The greatest eclipse of the series occurred on 1765 Aug 30, lasting 101 minutes, 27 seconds. | 1909 Nov 27 | 2144 Apr 18 | 2288 Jul 14 | 2450 Oct 21 |

Eclipses are tabulated in three columns; every third eclipse in the same column is one exeligmos apart, so they all cast shadows over approximately the same parts of the Earth.

Series members 37–59 occur between 1801 and 2200:
| 37 | 38 | 39 |
|---|---|---|
| 1801 Sep 22 | 1819 Oct 03 | 1837 Oct 13 |
| 40 | 41 | 42 |
| 1855 Oct 25 | 1873 Nov 04 | 1891 Nov 16 |
| 43 | 44 | 45 |
| 1909 Nov 27 | 1927 Dec 08 | 1945 Dec 19 |
| 46 | 47 | 48 |
| 1963 Dec 30 | 1982 Jan 09 | 2000 Jan 21 |
| 49 | 50 | 51 |
| 2018 Jan 31 | 2036 Feb 11 | 2054 Feb 22 |
| 52 | 53 | 54 |
| 2072 Mar 04 | 2090 Mar 15 | 2108 Mar 27 |
| 55 | 56 | 57 |
| 2126 Apr 07 | 2144 Apr 18 | 2162 Apr 29 |
| 58 | 59 | |
| 2180 May 09 | 2198 May 20 | |

=== Tritos series ===
This eclipse is a part of a tritos cycle, repeating at alternating nodes every 135 synodic months (≈ 3986.63 days, or 11 years minus 1 month). Their appearance and longitude are irregular due to a lack of synchronization with the anomalistic month (period of perigee), but groupings of 3 tritos cycles (≈ 33 years minus 3 months) come close (≈ 434.044 anomalistic months), so eclipses are similar in these groupings.

Series members between 1801 and 2200
| 1803 Aug 03 (Saros 106) | 1814 Jul 02 (Saros 107) | 1825 Jun 01 (Saros 108) | 1836 May 01 (Saros 109) | 1847 Mar 31 (Saros 110) |
| 1858 Feb 27 (Saros 111) | 1869 Jan 28 (Saros 112) | 1879 Dec 28 (Saros 113) | 1890 Nov 26 (Saros 114) | 1901 Oct 27 (Saros 115) |
| 1912 Sep 26 (Saros 116) | 1923 Aug 26 (Saros 117) | 1934 Jul 26 (Saros 118) | 1945 Jun 25 (Saros 119) | 1956 May 24 (Saros 120) |
| 1967 Apr 24 (Saros 121) | 1978 Mar 24 (Saros 122) | 1989 Feb 20 (Saros 123) | 2000 Jan 21 (Saros 124) | 2010 Dec 21 (Saros 125) |
| 2021 Nov 19 (Saros 126) | 2032 Oct 18 (Saros 127) | 2043 Sep 19 (Saros 128) | 2054 Aug 18 (Saros 129) | 2065 Jul 17 (Saros 130) |
| 2076 Jun 17 (Saros 131) | 2087 May 17 (Saros 132) | 2098 Apr 15 (Saros 133) | 2109 Mar 17 (Saros 134) | 2120 Feb 14 (Saros 135) |
| 2131 Jan 13 (Saros 136) | 2141 Dec 13 (Saros 137) | 2152 Nov 12 (Saros 138) | 2163 Oct 12 (Saros 139) | 2174 Sep 11 (Saros 140) |
| 2185 Aug 11 (Saros 141) | 2196 Jul 10 (Saros 142) | | | |

=== Inex series ===
This eclipse is a part of the long period inex cycle, repeating at alternating nodes, every 358 synodic months (≈ 10,571.95 days, or 29 years minus 20 days). Their appearance and longitude are irregular due to a lack of synchronization with the anomalistic month (period of perigee). However, groupings of 3 inex cycles (≈ 87 years minus 2 months) comes close (≈ 1,151.02 anomalistic months), so eclipses are similar in these groupings.

Series members between 1801 and 2200
| 1826 May 21 (Saros 118) | 1855 May 02 (Saros 119) | 1884 Apr 10 (Saros 120) |
| 1913 Mar 22 (Saros 121) | 1942 Mar 03 (Saros 122) | 1971 Feb 10 (Saros 123) |
| 2000 Jan 21 (Saros 124) | 2028 Dec 31 (Saros 125) | 2057 Dec 11 (Saros 126) |
| 2086 Nov 20 (Saros 127) | 2115 Nov 02 (Saros 128) | 2144 Oct 11 (Saros 129) |
2173 Sep 21 (Saros 130)

=== Half-Saros cycle ===
A lunar eclipse will be preceded and followed by solar eclipses by 9 years and 5.5 days (a half-saros). This lunar eclipse is related to two annular solar eclipses of Solar Saros 131.

| January 15, 1991 | January 26, 2009 |

== See also ==
- List of lunar eclipses
- List of 20th-century lunar eclipses
