= January 1982 lunar eclipse =

Total lunar eclipse 9 January 1982

- Total eclipse
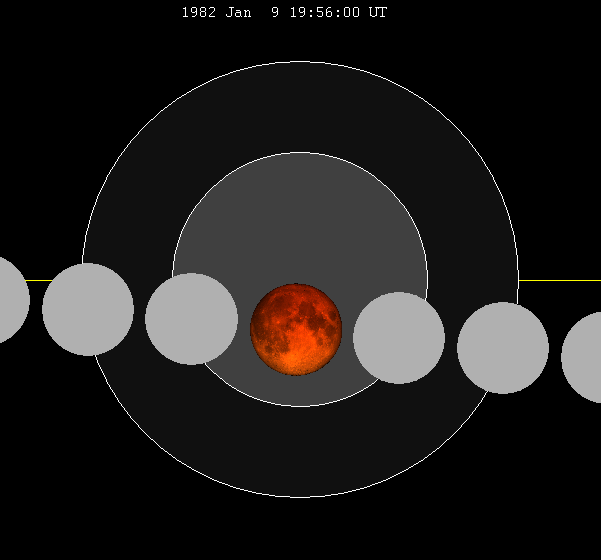
- The Moon's hourly motion shown right to left
- Date: January 9, 1982
- Gamma: −0.2916
- Magnitude: 1.3310
- Saros cycle: 124 (47 of 74)
- Totality: 77 minutes, 39 seconds
- Partiality: 203 minutes, 50 seconds
- Penumbral: 319 minutes, 6 seconds
Contacts (UTC)
- P1: 17:16:20
- U1: 18:13:56
- U2: 19:17:01
- Greatest: 19:55:51
- U3: 20:34:40
- U4: 21:37:45
- P4: 22:35:26

A total lunar eclipse occurred at the Moon’s ascending node of orbit on Saturday, January 9, 1982, with an umbral magnitude of 1.3310. A lunar eclipse occurs when the Moon moves into the Earth's shadow, causing the Moon to be darkened. A total lunar eclipse occurs when the Moon's near side entirely passes into the Earth's umbral shadow. Unlike a solar eclipse, which can only be viewed from a relatively small area of the world, a lunar eclipse may be viewed from anywhere on the night side of Earth. A total lunar eclipse can last up to nearly two hours, while a total solar eclipse lasts only a few minutes at any given place, because the Moon's shadow is smaller. Occurring about 1.3 days after perigee (on January 8, 1982, at 11:30 UTC), the Moon's apparent diameter was larger.

== Visibility ==
The eclipse was completely visible over much of Africa, Europe, and Asia, seen rising over northeastern North America, eastern South America, and west Africa and setting over Australia and the western Pacific Ocean.

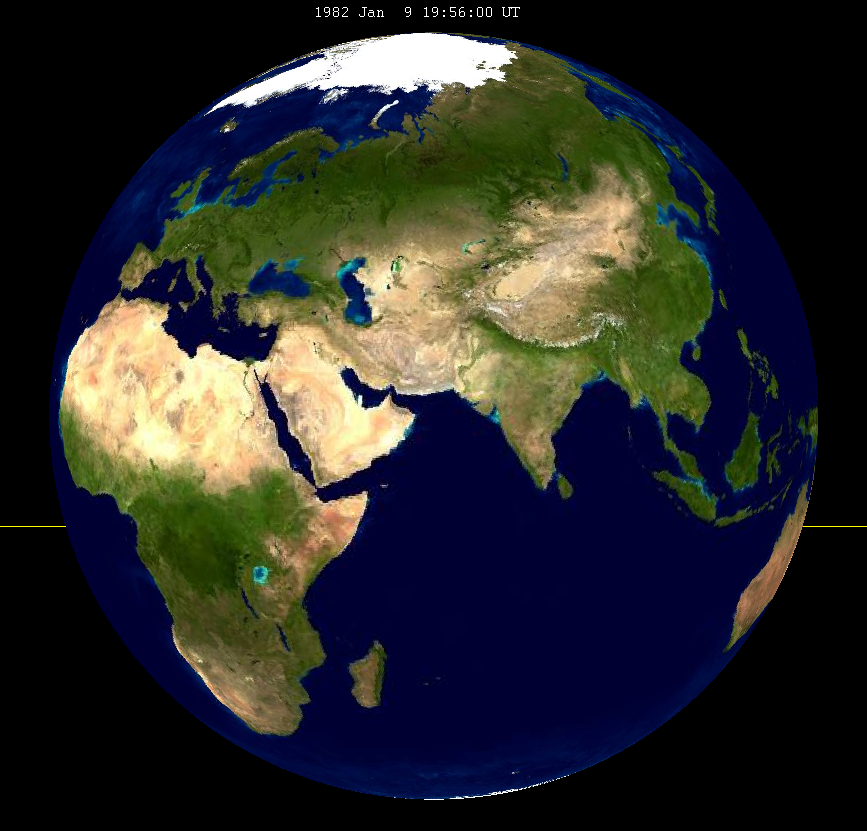
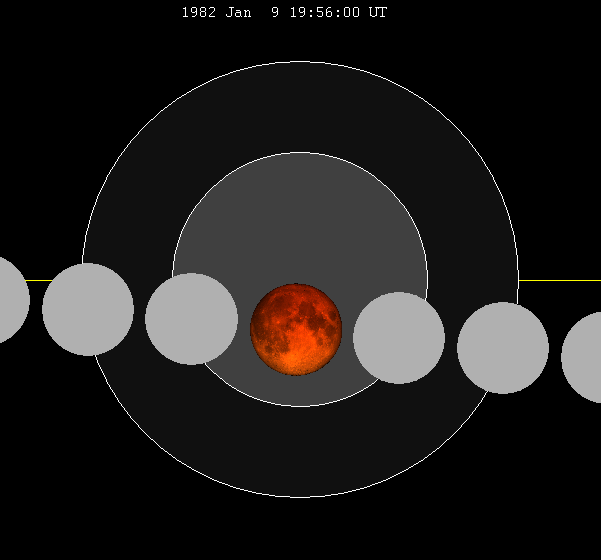

== Eclipse details ==
Shown below is a table displaying details about this particular lunar eclipse. It describes various parameters pertaining to this eclipse.

January 9, 1982 Lunar Eclipse Parameters
Parameter	Value
Penumbral Magnitude	2.31475
Umbral Magnitude	1.33103
Gamma	−0.29158
Sun Right Ascension	19h23m18.7s
Sun Declination	-22°03'36.2"
Sun Semi-Diameter	16'15.8"
Sun Equatorial Horizontal Parallax	08.9"
Moon Right Ascension	07h23m15.4s
Moon Declination	+21°45'55.7"
Moon Semi-Diameter	16'32.0"
Moon Equatorial Horizontal Parallax	1°00'40.7"
ΔT	52.3 s

== Eclipse season ==
This eclipse is part of an eclipse season, a period, roughly every six months, when eclipses occur. Only two (or occasionally three) eclipse seasons occur each year, and each season lasts about 35 days and repeats just short of six months (173 days) later; thus two full eclipse seasons always occur each year. Either two or three eclipses happen each eclipse season. In the sequence below, each eclipse is separated by a fortnight.

Eclipse season of January 1982
January 9 Ascending node (full moon)	January 25 Descending node (new moon)
Total lunar eclipse Lunar Saros 124	Partial solar eclipse Solar Saros 150

== Related eclipses ==
=== Eclipses in 1982 ===
- A total lunar eclipse on January 9.
- A partial solar eclipse on January 25.
- A partial solar eclipse on June 21.
- A total lunar eclipse on July 6.
- A partial solar eclipse on July 20.
- A partial solar eclipse on December 15.
- A total lunar eclipse on December 30.

=== Metonic ===
- Preceded by: Lunar eclipse of March 24, 1978
- Followed by: Lunar eclipse of October 28, 1985

=== Tzolkinex ===
- Preceded by: Lunar eclipse of November 29, 1974
- Followed by: Lunar eclipse of February 20, 1989

=== Half-Saros ===
- Preceded by: Solar eclipse of January 4, 1973
- Followed by: Solar eclipse of January 15, 1991

=== Tritos ===
- Preceded by: Lunar eclipse of February 10, 1971
- Followed by: Lunar eclipse of December 9, 1992

=== Lunar Saros 124 ===
- Preceded by: Lunar eclipse of December 30, 1963
- Followed by: Lunar eclipse of January 21, 2000

=== Inex ===
- Preceded by: Lunar eclipse of January 29, 1953
- Followed by: Lunar eclipse of December 21, 2010

=== Triad ===
- Preceded by: Lunar eclipse of March 11, 1895
- Followed by: Lunar eclipse of November 9, 2068

=== Lunar eclipses of 1980–1984 ===
This eclipse is a member of a semester series. An eclipse in a semester series of lunar eclipses repeats approximately every 177 days and 4 hours (a semester) at alternating nodes of the Moon's orbit.

The penumbral lunar eclipses on March 1, 1980 and August 26, 1980 occur in the previous lunar year eclipse set, and the penumbral lunar eclipses on May 15, 1984 and November 8, 1984 occur in the next lunar year eclipse set.

Lunar eclipse series sets from 1980 to 1984
Descending node				Ascending node			
Saros	Date Viewing	Type Chart	Gamma	Saros	Date Viewing	Type Chart	Gamma
109	1980 Jul 27	Penumbral	1.4139	114	1981 Jan 20	Penumbral	−1.0142
119	1981 Jul 17	Partial	0.7045	124	1982 Jan 09	Total	−0.2916
129	1982 Jul 06	Total	−0.0579	134	1982 Dec 30	Total	0.3758
139	1983 Jun 25	Partial	−0.8152	144	1983 Dec 20	Penumbral	1.0747
149	1984 Jun 13	Penumbral	−1.5240				

=== Saros 124 ===
This eclipse is a part of Saros series 124, repeating every 18 years, 11 days, and containing 73 events. The series started with a penumbral lunar eclipse on August 17, 1152. It contains partial eclipses from March 21, 1513 through June 15, 1639; total eclipses from June 25, 1657 through April 18, 2144; and a second set of partial eclipses from April 29, 2162 through July 14, 2288. The series ends at member 73 as a penumbral eclipse on October 21, 2450.

The longest duration of totality was produced by member 39 at 101 minutes, 27 seconds on August 30, 1765. All eclipses in this series occur at the Moon’s ascending node of orbit.

Greatest	First			
The greatest eclipse of the series occurred on 1765 Aug 30, lasting 101 minutes, 27 seconds.	Penumbral	Partial	Total	Central
The greatest eclipse of the series occurred on 1765 Aug 30, lasting 101 minutes, 27 seconds.	1152 Aug 17	1513 Mar 21	1657 Jun 25	1711 Jul 29
The greatest eclipse of the series occurred on 1765 Aug 30, lasting 101 minutes, 27 seconds.	Last			
The greatest eclipse of the series occurred on 1765 Aug 30, lasting 101 minutes, 27 seconds.	Central	Total	Partial	Penumbral
The greatest eclipse of the series occurred on 1765 Aug 30, lasting 101 minutes, 27 seconds.	1909 Nov 27	2144 Apr 18	2288 Jul 14	2450 Oct 21

Eclipses are tabulated in three columns; every third eclipse in the same column is one exeligmos apart, so they all cast shadows over approximately the same parts of the Earth.

Series members 37–59 occur between 1801 and 2200:
37	38	39
1801 Sep 22	1819 Oct 03	1837 Oct 13
40	41	42
1855 Oct 25	1873 Nov 04	1891 Nov 16
43	44	45
1909 Nov 27	1927 Dec 08	1945 Dec 19
46	47	48
1963 Dec 30	1982 Jan 09	2000 Jan 21
49	50	51
2018 Jan 31	2036 Feb 11	2054 Feb 22
52	53	54
2072 Mar 04	2090 Mar 15	2108 Mar 27
55	56	57
2126 Apr 07	2144 Apr 18	2162 Apr 29
58	59	
2180 May 09	2198 May 20	

=== Tritos series ===
This eclipse is a part of a tritos cycle, repeating at alternating nodes every 135 synodic months (≈ 3986.63 days, or 11 years minus 1 month). Their appearance and longitude are irregular due to a lack of synchronization with the anomalistic month (period of perigee), but groupings of 3 tritos cycles (≈ 33 years minus 3 months) come close (≈ 434.044 anomalistic months), so eclipses are similar in these groupings.

Series members between 1801 and 2200
1807 May 21 (Saros 108)	1818 Apr 21 (Saros 109)	1829 Mar 20 (Saros 110)	1840 Feb 17 (Saros 111)	1851 Jan 17 (Saros 112)
1861 Dec 17 (Saros 113)	1872 Nov 15 (Saros 114)	1883 Oct 16 (Saros 115)	1894 Sep 15 (Saros 116)	1905 Aug 15 (Saros 117)
1916 Jul 15 (Saros 118)	1927 Jun 15 (Saros 119)	1938 May 14 (Saros 120)	1949 Apr 13 (Saros 121)	1960 Mar 13 (Saros 122)
1971 Feb 10 (Saros 123)	1982 Jan 09 (Saros 124)	1992 Dec 09 (Saros 125)	2003 Nov 09 (Saros 126)	2014 Oct 08 (Saros 127)
2025 Sep 07 (Saros 128)	2036 Aug 07 (Saros 129)	2047 Jul 07 (Saros 130)	2058 Jun 06 (Saros 131)	2069 May 06 (Saros 132)
2080 Apr 04 (Saros 133)	2091 Mar 05 (Saros 134)	2102 Feb 03 (Saros 135)	2113 Jan 02 (Saros 136)	2123 Dec 03 (Saros 137)
2134 Nov 02 (Saros 138)	2145 Sep 30 (Saros 139)	2156 Aug 30 (Saros 140)	2167 Aug 01 (Saros 141)	2178 Jun 30 (Saros 142)
2189 May 29 (Saros 143)	2200 Apr 30 (Saros 144)			

=== Inex series ===
This eclipse is a part of the long period inex cycle, repeating at alternating nodes, every 358 synodic months (≈ 10,571.95 days, or 29 years minus 20 days). Their appearance and longitude are irregular due to a lack of synchronization with the anomalistic month (period of perigee). However, groupings of 3 inex cycles (≈ 87 years minus 2 months) comes close (≈ 1,151.02 anomalistic months), so eclipses are similar in these groupings.

Series members between 1801 and 2200
1808 May 10 (Saros 118)	1837 Apr 20 (Saros 119)	1866 Mar 31 (Saros 120)
1895 Mar 11 (Saros 121)	1924 Feb 20 (Saros 122)	1953 Jan 29 (Saros 123)
1982 Jan 09 (Saros 124)	2010 Dec 21 (Saros 125)	2039 Nov 30 (Saros 126)
2068 Nov 09 (Saros 127)	2097 Oct 21 (Saros 128)	2126 Oct 01 (Saros 129)
2155 Sep 11 (Saros 130)	2184 Aug 21 (Saros 131)	

=== Half-Saros cycle ===
A lunar eclipse will be preceded and followed by solar eclipses by 9 years and 5.5 days (a half saros). This lunar eclipse is related to two annular solar eclipses of Solar Saros 131.

January 4, 1973	January 15, 1991

== See also ==
- List of lunar eclipses
- List of 20th-century lunar eclipses
