= February 2054 lunar eclipse =

Astronomical event

- Total eclipse
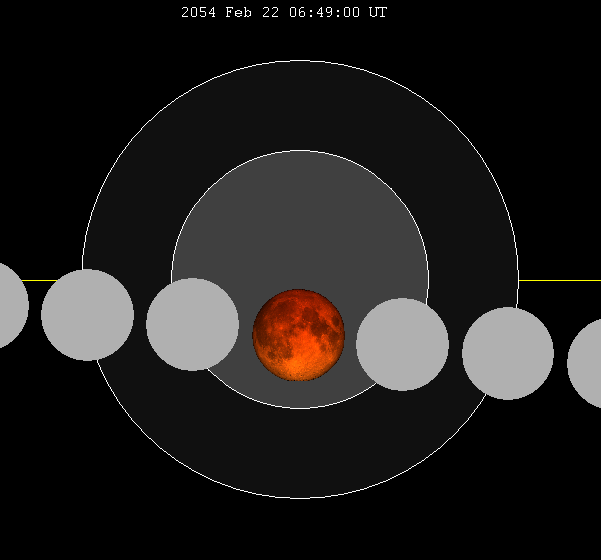
- The Moon's hourly motion shown right to left
- Date: February 22, 2054
- Gamma: −0.3242
- Magnitude: 1.2781
- Saros cycle: 124 (51 of 74)
- Totality: 72 minutes, 8 seconds
- Partiality: 200 minutes, 53 seconds
- Penumbral: 314 minutes, 45 seconds
Contacts (UTC)
- P1: 4:12:25
- U1: 5:09:19
- U2: 6:13:41
- Greatest: 6:49:46
- U3: 7:25:49
- U4: 8:30:12
- P4: 9:27:09

A total lunar eclipse will occur at the Moon’s ascending node of orbit on Sunday, February 22, 2054, with an umbral magnitude of 1.2781. A lunar eclipse occurs when the Moon moves into the Earth's shadow, causing the Moon to be darkened. A total lunar eclipse occurs when the Moon's near side entirely passes into the Earth's umbral shadow. Unlike a solar eclipse, which can only be viewed from a relatively small area of the world, a lunar eclipse may be viewed from anywhere on the night side of Earth. A total lunar eclipse can last up to nearly two hours, while a total solar eclipse lasts only a few minutes at any given place, because the Moon's shadow is smaller. Occurring about 1.2 days before perigee (on February 21, 2054, at 2:55 UTC), the Moon's apparent diameter will be larger.

This lunar eclipse will be the first of an almost tetrad, with the others being on August 18, 2054 (total); February 11, 2055 (total); and August 7, 2055 (partial).

== Visibility ==
The eclipse will be completely visible over North and South America, seen rising over much of Africa and Europe and setting over northeast Asia and eastern Australia.

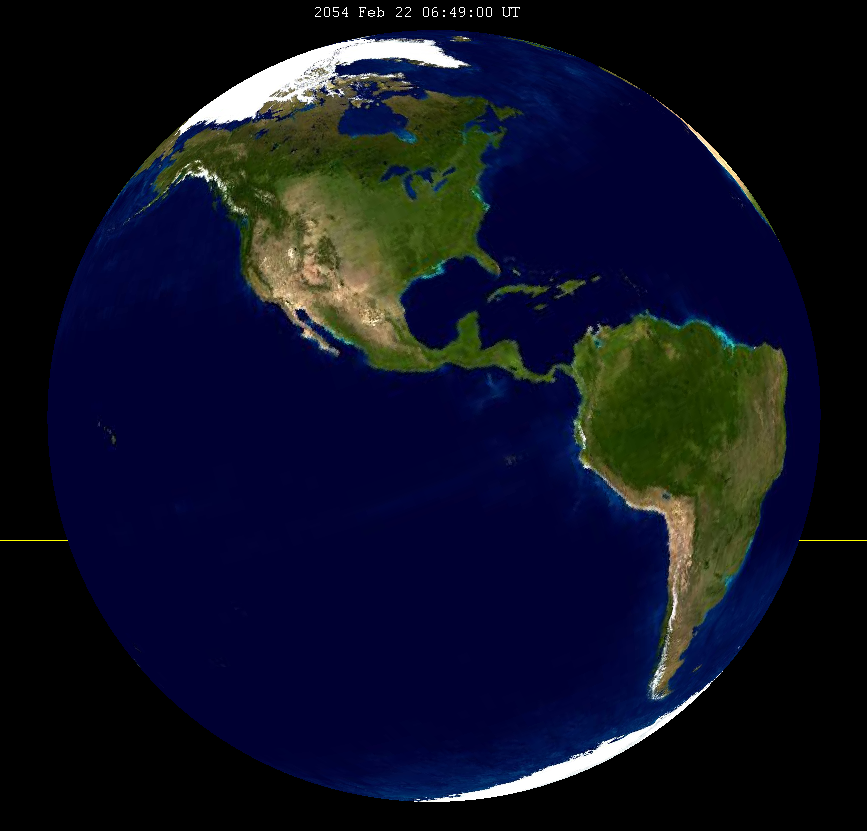
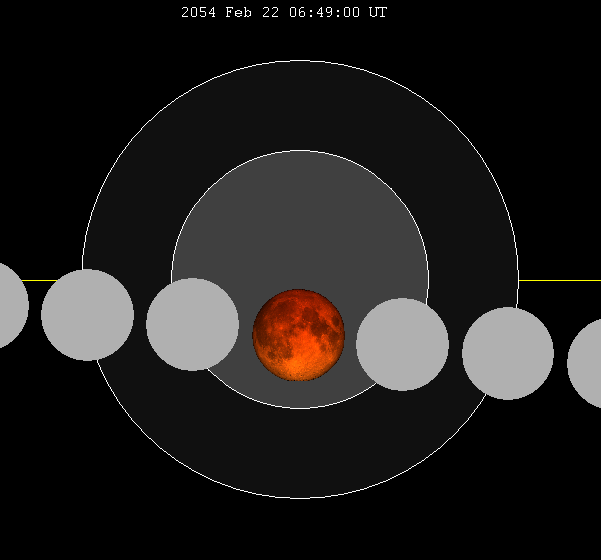

== Eclipse details ==
Shown below is a table displaying details about this particular solar eclipse. It describes various parameters pertaining to this eclipse.

February 22, 2054 Lunar Eclipse Parameters
Parameter	Value
Penumbral Magnitude	2.25022
Umbral Magnitude	1.27805
Gamma	−0.32419
Sun Right Ascension	22h23m02.4s
Sun Declination	-10°05'18.4"
Sun Semi-Diameter	16'10.2"
Sun Equatorial Horizontal Parallax	08.9"
Moon Right Ascension	10h22m40.9s
Moon Declination	+09°46'14.8"
Moon Semi-Diameter	16'38.0"
Moon Equatorial Horizontal Parallax	1°01'02.7"
ΔT	87.8 s

== Eclipse season ==
This eclipse is part of an eclipse season, a period, roughly every six months, when eclipses occur. Only two (or occasionally three) eclipse seasons occur each year, and each season lasts about 35 days and repeats just short of six months (173 days) later; thus two full eclipse seasons always occur each year. Either two or three eclipses happen each eclipse season. In the sequence below, each eclipse is separated by a fortnight.

Eclipse season of February–March 2054
February 22 Ascending node (full moon)	March 9 Descending node (new moon)
Total lunar eclipse Lunar Saros 124	Partial solar eclipse Solar Saros 150

== Related eclipses ==
=== Eclipses in 2054 ===
- A total lunar eclipse on February 22.
- A partial solar eclipse on March 9.
- A partial solar eclipse on August 3.
- A total lunar eclipse on August 18.
- A partial solar eclipse on September 2.

=== Metonic ===
- Preceded by: Lunar eclipse of May 6, 2050
- Followed by: Lunar eclipse of December 11, 2057

=== Tzolkinex ===
- Preceded by: Lunar eclipse of January 12, 2047
- Followed by: Lunar eclipse of April 4, 2061

=== Half-Saros ===
- Preceded by: Solar eclipse of February 16, 2045
- Followed by: Solar eclipse of February 28, 2063

=== Tritos ===
- Preceded by: Lunar eclipse of March 25, 2043
- Followed by: Lunar eclipse of January 22, 2065

=== Lunar Saros 124 ===
- Preceded by: Lunar eclipse of February 11, 2036
- Followed by: Lunar eclipse of March 4, 2072

=== Inex ===
- Preceded by: Lunar eclipse of March 14, 2025
- Followed by: Lunar eclipse of February 2, 2083

=== Triad ===
- Preceded by: Lunar eclipse of April 24, 1967
- Followed by: Lunar eclipse of December 23, 2140

=== Lunar eclipses of 2053–2056 ===
This eclipse is a member of a semester series. An eclipse in a semester series of lunar eclipses repeats approximately every 177 days and 4 hours (a semester) at alternating nodes of the Moon's orbit.

The penumbral lunar eclipses on June 27, 2056 and December 22, 2056 occur in the next lunar year eclipse set.

Lunar eclipse series sets from 2053 to 2056
Ascending node				Descending node			
Saros	Date Viewing	Type Chart	Gamma	Saros	Date Viewing	Type Chart	Gamma
114	2053 Mar 04	Penumbral	−1.0530	119	2053 Aug 29	Penumbral	1.0165
124	2054 Feb 22	Total	−0.3242	129	2054 Aug 18	Total	0.2806
134	2055 Feb 11	Total	0.3526	139	2055 Aug 07	Partial	−0.4769
144	2056 Feb 01	Penumbral	1.0682	149	2056 Jul 26	Partial	−1.2048

=== Saros 124 ===
This eclipse is a part of Saros series 124, repeating every 18 years, 11 days, and containing 73 events. The series started with a penumbral lunar eclipse on August 17, 1152. It contains partial eclipses from March 21, 1513 through June 15, 1639; total eclipses from June 25, 1657 through April 18, 2144; and a second set of partial eclipses from April 29, 2162 through July 14, 2288. The series ends at member 73 as a penumbral eclipse on October 21, 2450.

The longest duration of totality was produced by member 39 at 101 minutes, 27 seconds on August 30, 1765. All eclipses in this series occur at the Moon’s ascending node of orbit.

Greatest	First			
The greatest eclipse of the series occurred on 1765 Aug 30, lasting 101 minutes, 27 seconds.	Penumbral	Partial	Total	Central
The greatest eclipse of the series occurred on 1765 Aug 30, lasting 101 minutes, 27 seconds.	1152 Aug 17	1513 Mar 21	1657 Jun 25	1711 Jul 29
The greatest eclipse of the series occurred on 1765 Aug 30, lasting 101 minutes, 27 seconds.	Last			
The greatest eclipse of the series occurred on 1765 Aug 30, lasting 101 minutes, 27 seconds.	Central	Total	Partial	Penumbral
The greatest eclipse of the series occurred on 1765 Aug 30, lasting 101 minutes, 27 seconds.	1909 Nov 27	2144 Apr 18	2288 Jul 14	2450 Oct 21

Eclipses are tabulated in three columns; every third eclipse in the same column is one exeligmos apart, so they all cast shadows over approximately the same parts of the Earth.

Series members 37–59 occur between 1801 and 2200:
37	38	39
1801 Sep 22	1819 Oct 03	1837 Oct 13
40	41	42
1855 Oct 25	1873 Nov 04	1891 Nov 16
43	44	45
1909 Nov 27	1927 Dec 08	1945 Dec 19
46	47	48
1963 Dec 30	1982 Jan 09	2000 Jan 21
49	50	51
2018 Jan 31	2036 Feb 11	2054 Feb 22
52	53	54
2072 Mar 04	2090 Mar 15	2108 Mar 27
55	56	57
2126 Apr 07	2144 Apr 18	2162 Apr 29
58	59	
2180 May 09	2198 May 20	

=== Tritos series ===
This eclipse is a part of a tritos cycle, repeating at alternating nodes every 135 synodic months (≈ 3986.63 days, or 11 years minus 1 month). Their appearance and longitude are irregular due to a lack of synchronization with the anomalistic month (period of perigee), but groupings of 3 tritos cycles (≈ 33 years minus 3 months) come close (≈ 434.044 anomalistic months), so eclipses are similar in these groupings.

Series members between 1801 and 2200
1803 Feb 06 (Saros 101)	1814 Jan 06 (Saros 102)	1824 Dec 06 (Saros 103)		1846 Oct 04 (Saros 105)
1857 Sep 04 (Saros 106)	1868 Aug 03 (Saros 107)	1879 Jul 03 (Saros 108)	1890 Jun 03 (Saros 109)	1901 May 03 (Saros 110)
1912 Apr 01 (Saros 111)	1923 Mar 03 (Saros 112)	1934 Jan 30 (Saros 113)	1944 Dec 29 (Saros 114)	1955 Nov 29 (Saros 115)
1966 Oct 29 (Saros 116)	1977 Sep 27 (Saros 117)	1988 Aug 27 (Saros 118)	1999 Jul 28 (Saros 119)	2010 Jun 26 (Saros 120)
2021 May 26 (Saros 121)	2032 Apr 25 (Saros 122)	2043 Mar 25 (Saros 123)	2054 Feb 22 (Saros 124)	2065 Jan 22 (Saros 125)
2075 Dec 22 (Saros 126)	2086 Nov 20 (Saros 127)	2097 Oct 21 (Saros 128)	2108 Sep 20 (Saros 129)	2119 Aug 20 (Saros 130)
2130 Jul 21 (Saros 131)	2141 Jun 19 (Saros 132)	2152 May 18 (Saros 133)	2163 Apr 19 (Saros 134)	2174 Mar 18 (Saros 135)
2185 Feb 14 (Saros 136)	2196 Jan 15 (Saros 137)			

=== Inex series ===
This eclipse is a part of the long period inex cycle, repeating at alternating nodes, every 358 synodic months (≈ 10,571.95 days, or 29 years minus 20 days). Their appearance and longitude are irregular due to a lack of synchronization with the anomalistic month (period of perigee). However, groupings of 3 inex cycles (≈ 87 years minus 2 months) comes close (≈ 1,151.02 anomalistic months), so eclipses are similar in these groupings.

Series members between 1801 and 2200
1822 Aug 03 (Saros 116)	1851 Jul 13 (Saros 117)	1880 Jun 22 (Saros 118)
1909 Jun 04 (Saros 119)	1938 May 14 (Saros 120)	1967 Apr 24 (Saros 121)
1996 Apr 04 (Saros 122)	2025 Mar 14 (Saros 123)	2054 Feb 22 (Saros 124)
2083 Feb 02 (Saros 125)	2112 Jan 14 (Saros 126)	2140 Dec 23 (Saros 127)
2169 Dec 04 (Saros 128)	2198 Nov 13 (Saros 129)	

=== Half-Saros cycle ===
A lunar eclipse will be preceded and followed by solar eclipses by 9 years and 5.5 days (a half saros). This lunar eclipse is related to two solar eclipses of Solar Saros 131.

February 16, 2045	February 28, 2063

== See also ==
- List of lunar eclipses and List of 21st-century lunar eclipses
