= Lunar Saros 124 =

Eclipse cycle of the moon

Member 48	Member 49
2000 Jan 21	2018 Jan 31

Saros cycle series 124 for lunar eclipses occurs at the moon's ascending node, 18 years 11 and 1/3 days. It contains 73 member events, with 28 total eclipses, starting in 1657 and ending in 2144. The order is 20 penumbral, 8 partial, 28 total, 8 partial, 9 penumbral.

This lunar saros is linked to Solar Saros 131.

Cat.	Saros	Mem	Date	Time UT (hr:mn)	Type	Gamma	Magnitude	Duration (min)			Contacts UT (hr:mn)						Chart
Cat.	Saros	Mem	Date	Greatest	Type	Gamma	Magnitude	Pen.	Par.	Tot.	P1	P4	U1	U2	U3	U4	Chart
07599	124	1	1152 Aug 17	0:06:26	Penumbral	1.5433	-1.0123	79.1			23:26:53	0:45:59					
07647	124	2	1170 Aug 28	7:00:31	Penumbral	1.4807	-0.8983	130.5			5:55:16	8:05:46					
07693	124	3	1188 Sep 7	14:02:23	Penumbral	1.4234	-0.7943	162.8			12:40:59	15:23:47					
07739	124	4	1206 Sep 18	21:15:39	Penumbral	1.3744	-0.7054	185.1			19:43:06	22:48:12					
07785	124	5	1224 Sep 29	4:37:55	Penumbral	1.3317	-0.6281	201.9			2:56:58	6:18:52					
07830	124	6	1242 Oct 10	12:09:48	Penumbral	1.2959	-0.5633	214.5			10:22:33	13:57:03					
07875	124	7	1260 Oct 20	19:50:54	Penumbral	1.2670	-0.5110	223.8			17:59:00	21:42:48					
07920	124	8	1278 Nov 01	3:41:09	Penumbral	1.2453	-0.4715	230.3			1:46:00	5:36:18					
07965	124	9	1296 Nov 11	11:38:19	Penumbral	1.2282	-0.4402	235.0			9:40:49	13:35:49					
08009	124	10	1314 Nov 22	19:41:06	Penumbral	1.2152	-0.4162	238.2			17:42:00	21:40:12					
08052	124	11	1332 Dec 03	3:48:29	Penumbral	1.2052	-0.3975	240.4			1:48:17	5:48:41					
08093	124	12	1350 Dec 14	11:59:03	Penumbral	1.1975	-0.3824	241.8			9:58:09	13:59:57					
08134	124	13	1368 Dec 24	20:09:43	Penumbral	1.1894	-0.3662	243.1			18:08:10	22:11:16					
08175	124	14	1387 Jan 05	4:20:25	Penumbral	1.1807	-0.3488	244.5			2:18:10	6:22:40					
08216	124	15	1405 Jan 15	12:28:24	Penumbral	1.1692	-0.3257	246.4			10:25:12	14:31:36					
08257	124	16	1423 Jan 26	20:33:05	Penumbral	1.1544	-0.2962	248.9			18:28:38	22:37:32					
08299	124	17	1441 Feb 06	4:31:34	Penumbral	1.1337	-0.2557	252.7			2:25:13	6:37:55					
08340	124	18	1459 Feb 17	12:25:19	Penumbral	1.1084	-0.2065	257.2			10:16:43	14:33:55					
08381	124	19	1477 Feb 27	20:11:49	Penumbral	1.0767	-0.1454	262.7			18:00:28	22:23:10					
08421	124	20	1495 Mar 11	3:50:59	Penumbral	1.0379	-0.0711	269.3			1:36:20	6:05:38					
08461	124	21	1513 Mar 21	11:22:52	Partial	0.9922	0.0158	276.5	29.8		9:04:37	13:41:07	11:07:58			11:37:46	
08502	124	22	1531 Apr 01	18:47:57	Partial	0.9400	0.1149	284.2	79.0		16:25:51	21:10:03	18:08:27			19:27:27	
08543	124	23	1549 Apr 12	2:06:54	Partial	0.8818	0.2247	292.0	108.4		23:40:54	4:32:54	1:12:42			3:01:06	
08587	124	24	1567 Apr 23	9:18:49	Partial	0.8168	0.3469	299.8	131.9		6:48:55	11:48:43	8:12:52			10:24:46	
08630	124	25	1585 May 13	16:27:07	Partial	0.7477	0.4765	307.1	151.1		13:53:34	19:00:40	15:11:34			17:42:40	
08673	124	26	1603 May 24	23:30:55	Partial	0.6737	0.6150	313.9	167.4		20:53:58	2:07:52	22:07:13			0:54:37	
08718	124	27	1621 Jun 04	6:32:45	Partial	0.5970	0.7582	319.9	180.9		3:52:48	9:12:42	5:02:18			8:03:12	
08762	124	28	1639 Jun 15	13:32:42	Partial	0.5176	0.9059	325.0	192.1		10:50:12	16:15:12	11:56:39			15:08:45	
08806	124	29	1657 Jun 25	20:33:50	Total	0.4380	1.0540	329.1	201.0	35.9	17:49:17	23:18:23	18:53:20	20:15:53	20:51:47	22:14:20	
08851	124	30	1675 Jul 07	3:36:11	Total	0.3582	1.2020	332.3	207.9	66.2	0:50:02	6:22:20	1:52:14	3:03:05	4:09:17	5:20:08	
08897	124	31	1693 Jul 17	10:41:02	Total	0.2793	1.3482	334.4	213.0	82.4	7:53:50	13:28:14	8:54:32	9:59:50	11:22:14	12:27:32	
08944	124	32	1711 Jul 29	17:50:25	Total	0.2032	1.4889	335.7	216.4	92.2	15:02:34	20:38:16	16:02:13	17:04:19	18:36:31	19:38:37	
08991	124	33	1729 Aug 09	1:05:17	Total	0.1305	1.6232	336.1	218.4	98.0	22:17:14	3:53:20	23:16:05	0:16:17	1:54:17	2:54:29	
09037	124	34	1747 Aug 20	8:26:59	Total	0.0627	1.7484	335.8	219.1	100.8	5:39:05	11:14:53	6:37:26	7:36:35	9:17:23	10:16:32	
09084	124	35	1765 Aug 30	15:55:32	Total	-0.0004	1.8629	334.9	218.9	101.4	13:08:05	18:42:59	14:06:05	15:04:50	16:46:14	17:44:59	
09129	124	36	1783 Sep 10	23:33:06	Total	-0.0569	1.7595	333.6	217.9	100.4	20:46:18	2:19:54	21:44:09	22:42:54	0:23:18	1:22:03	
09174	124	37	1801 Sep 22	7:18:55	Total	-0.1074	1.6669	332.1	216.4	98.2	4:32:52	10:04:58	5:30:43	6:29:49	8:08:01	9:07:07	
09219	124	38	1819 Oct 03	15:13:28	Total	-0.1510	1.5868	330.4	214.5	95.3	12:28:16	17:58:40	13:26:13	14:25:49	16:01:07	17:00:43	
09265	124	39	1837 Oct 13	23:17:06	Total	-0.1878	1.5192	328.6	212.6	92.0	20:32:48	2:01:24	21:30:48	22:31:06	0:03:06	1:03:24	
09311	124	40	1855 Oct 25	7:29:40	Total	-0.2177	1.4643	327.0	210.8	88.7	4:46:10	10:13:10	5:44:16	6:45:19	8:14:01	9:15:04	
09355	124	41	1873 Nov 04	15:51:03	Total	-0.2408	1.4217	325.4	209.1	85.7	13:08:21	18:33:45	14:06:30	15:08:12	16:33:54	17:35:36	
09399	124	42	1891 Nov 16	0:18:46	Total	-0.2592	1.3880	324.0	207.6	83.1	21:36:46	3:00:46	22:34:58	23:37:13	1:00:19	2:02:34	
09442	124	43	1909 Nov 27	8:54:41	Total	-0.2712	1.3660	322.8	206.5	81.2	6:13:17	11:36:05	7:11:26	8:14:05	9:35:17	10:37:56	
09484	124	44	1927 Dec 08	17:35:10	Total	-0.2796	1.3510	321.8	205.6	79.8	14:54:16	20:16:04	15:52:22	16:55:16	18:15:04	19:17:58	
09526	124	45	1945 Dec 19	2:20:47	Total	-0.2845	1.3424	320.9	204.9	78.9	23:40:20	5:01:14	0:38:20	1:41:20	3:00:14	4:03:14	
09567	124	46	1963 Dec 30	11:07:25	Total	-0.2889	1.3350	320.0	204.3	78.1	8:27:25	13:47:25	9:25:16	10:28:22	11:46:28	12:49:34	
09608	124	47	1982 Jan 09	19:56:44	Total	-0.2916	1.3310	319.1	203.8	77.7	17:17:11	22:36:17	18:14:50	19:17:53	20:35:35	21:38:38	
09649	124	48	2000 Jan 21	4:44:34	Total	-0.2957	1.3246	318.2	203.3	77.0	2:05:28	7:23:40	3:02:55	4:06:04	5:23:04	6:26:13	
09690	124	49	2018 Jan 31	13:31:00	Total	-0.3014	1.3155	317.2	202.7	76.1	10:52:24	16:09:36	11:49:39	12:52:57	14:09:03	15:12:21	
09731	124	50	2036 Feb 11	22:13:06	Total	-0.3110	1.2995	316.1	201.9	74.5	19:35:03	0:51:09	20:32:09	21:35:51	22:50:21	23:54:03	
09771	124	51	2054 Feb 22	6:51:27	Total	-0.3242	1.2769	314.7	200.9	72.1	4:14:06	9:28:48	5:11:00	6:15:24	7:27:30	8:31:54	
09812	124	52	2072 Mar 04	15:23:07	Total	-0.3430	1.2441	313.2	199.4	68.5	12:46:31	17:59:43	13:43:25	14:48:52	15:57:22	17:02:49	
09853	124	53	2090 Mar 15	23:48:31	Total	-0.3674	1.2012	311.3	197.5	63.0	21:12:52	2:24:10	22:09:46	23:17:01	0:20:01	1:27:16	
09896	124	54	2108 Mar 27	8:06:28	Total	-0.3982	1.1467	309.0	194.8	54.7	5:31:58	10:40:58	6:29:04	7:39:07	8:33:49	9:43:52	
09938	124	55	2126 Apr 07	16:17:55	Total	-0.4346	1.0817	306.3	191.5	41.6	13:44:46	18:51:04	14:42:10	15:57:07	16:38:43	17:53:40	
09981	124	56	2144 Apr 18	0:20:29	Total	-0.4787	1.0026	302.9	187.0	7.6	21:49:02	2:51:56	22:46:59	0:16:41	0:24:17	1:53:59	
10025	124	57	2162 Apr 29	8:17:08	Partial	-0.5280	0.9137	298.9	181.3		5:47:41	10:46:35	6:46:29			9:47:47	
10068	124	58	2180 May 09	16:05:58	Partial	-0.5840	0.8124	294.1	173.9		13:38:55	18:33:01	14:39:01			17:32:55	
10111	124	59	2198 May 20	23:50:32	Partial	-0.6436	0.7041	288.4	164.8		21:26:20	2:14:44	22:28:08			1:12:56	
10155	124	60	2216 Jun 01	7:27:36	Partial	-0.7097	0.5839	281.6	153.0		5:06:48	9:48:24	6:11:06			8:44:06	
10199	124	61	2234 Jun 12	15:02:55	Partial	-0.7774	0.4604	273.8	138.4		12:46:01	17:19:49	13:53:43			16:12:07	
10244	124	62	2252 Jun 22	22:33:27	Partial	-0.8494	0.3286	264.6	119.3		20:21:09	0:45:45	21:33:48			23:33:06	
10290	124	63	2270 Jul 04	6:03:42	Partial	-0.9214	0.1965	254.2	94.0		3:56:36	8:10:48	5:16:42			6:50:42	
10336	124	64	2288 Jul 14	13:31:30	Partial	-0.9954	0.0604	242.3	53.1		11:30:21	15:32:39	13:04:57			13:58:03	
10383	124	65	2306 Jul 26	21:01:27	Penumbral	-1.0676	-0.0725	229.2			19:06:51	22:56:03					
10429	124	66	2324 Aug 06	4:31:49	Penumbral	-1.1392	-0.2050	214.5			2:44:34	6:19:04					
10475	124	67	2342 Aug 17	12:05:10	Penumbral	-1.2083	-0.3328	198.2			10:26:04	13:44:16					
10520	124	68	2360 Aug 27	19:41:56	Penumbral	-1.2741	-0.4551	180.3			18:11:47	21:12:05					
10565	124	69	2378 Sep 08	3:23:53	Penumbral	-1.3354	-0.5691	160.9			2:03:26	4:44:20					
10609	124	70	2396 Sep 18	11:11:24	Penumbral	-1.3918	-0.6746	139.6			10:01:36	12:21:12					
10654	124	71	2414 Sep 29	19:04:37	Penumbral	-1.4432	-0.7710	115.8			18:06:43	20:02:31					
10698	124	72	2432 Oct 10	3:05:14	Penumbral	-1.4883	-0.8560	88.8			2:20:50	3:49:38					
10742	124	73	2450 Oct 21	11:12:18	Penumbral	-1.5280	-0.9312	53.5			10:45:33	11:39:03					

== See also ==
- List of lunar eclipses
  - List of Saros series for lunar eclipses
