= December 2028 lunar eclipse =

Astronomical event

- Total eclipse
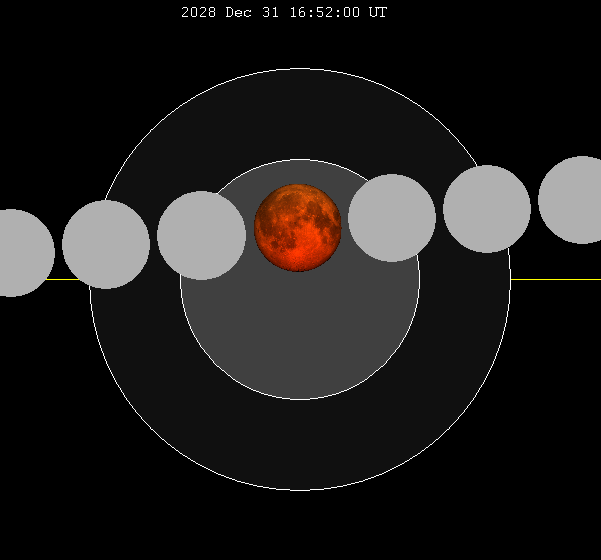
- The Moon's hourly motion shown right to left
- Date: December 31, 2028
- Gamma: 0.3258
- Magnitude: 1.2479
- Saros cycle: 125 (49 of 72)
- Totality: 71 minutes, 20 seconds
- Partiality: 208 minutes, 49 seconds
- Penumbral: 336 minutes, 13 seconds
Contacts (UTC)
- P1: 14:03:49
- U1: 15:07:35
- U2: 16:16:19
- Greatest: 16:51:58
- U3: 17:27:40
- U4: 18:36:24
- P4: 19:40:02

A total lunar eclipse will occur at the Moon’s descending node of orbit on Sunday, December 31, 2028, with an umbral magnitude of 1.2479. A lunar eclipse occurs when the Moon moves into the Earth's shadow, causing the Moon to be darkened. A total lunar eclipse occurs when the Moon's near side entirely passes into the Earth's umbral shadow. Unlike a solar eclipse, which can only be viewed from a relatively small area of the world, a lunar eclipse may be viewed from anywhere on the night side of Earth. A total lunar eclipse can last up to nearly two hours, while a total solar eclipse lasts only a few minutes at any given place, because the Moon's shadow is smaller. Occurring about 4.3 days before perigee (on January 4, 2029, at 23:15 UTC), the Moon's apparent diameter will be larger.

This eclipse will occur during a blue moon and is the first such eclipse to happen on New Year's Eve and New Year's Day since December 2009. The next such eclipse will be in December 2047 (though January 2048 for most timezones).

== Visibility ==
The eclipse will be completely visible over eastern Europe, Asia, and Australia, seen rising over Africa and Europe and setting over the eastern Pacific Ocean and western North America.

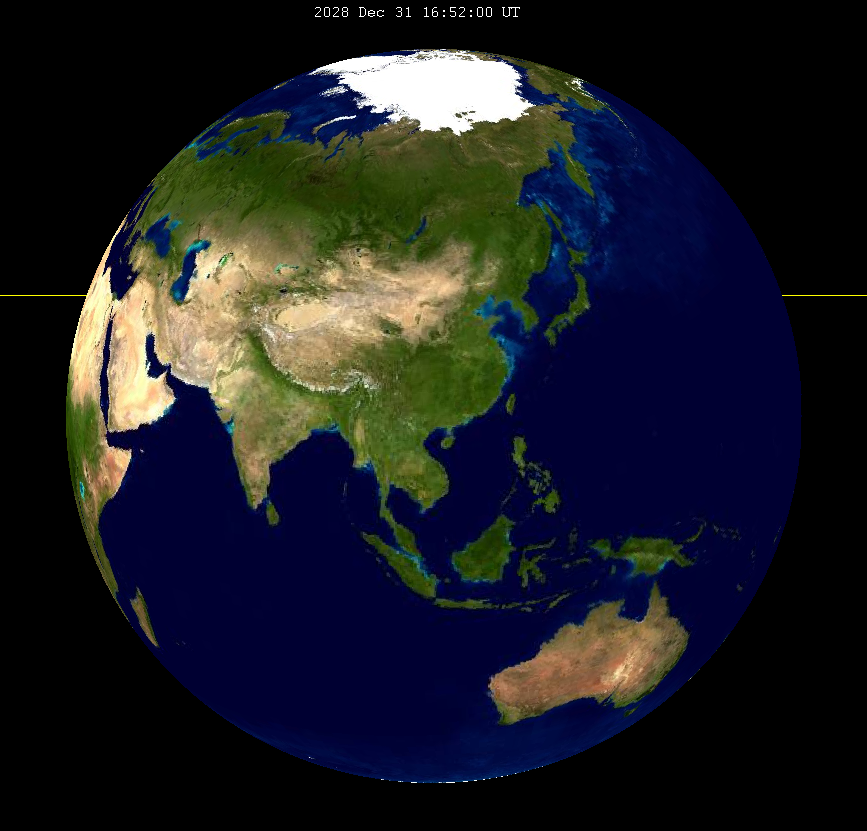
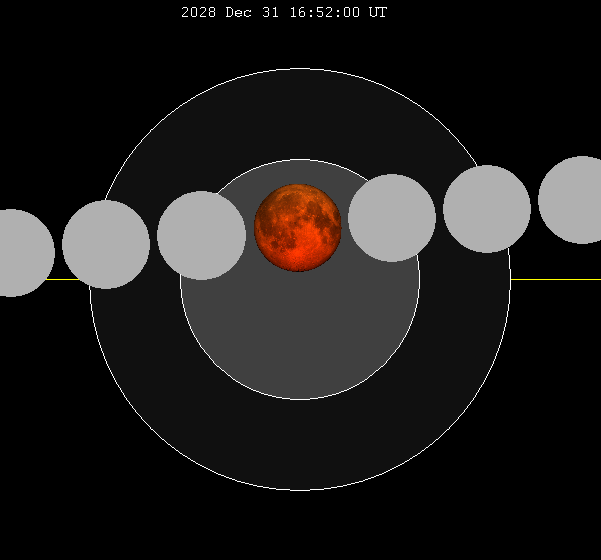

== Eclipse details ==
Shown below is a table displaying details about this particular lunar eclipse. It describes various parameters pertaining to this eclipse.

December 31, 2028 Lunar Eclipse Parameters
Parameter	Value
Penumbral Magnitude	2.27579
Umbral Magnitude	1.24785
Gamma	0.32583
Sun Right Ascension	18h45m53.7s
Sun Declination	-23°01'00.5"
Sun Semi-Diameter	16'15.9"
Sun Equatorial Horizontal Parallax	08.9"
Moon Right Ascension	06h46m08.4s
Moon Declination	+23°19'37.5"
Moon Semi-Diameter	15'49.4"
Moon Equatorial Horizontal Parallax	0°58'04.3"
ΔT	73.4 s

== Eclipse season ==
This eclipse is part of an eclipse season, a period, roughly every six months, when eclipses occur. Only two (or occasionally three) eclipse seasons occur each year, and each season lasts about 35 days and repeats just short of six months (173 days) later; thus two full eclipse seasons always occur each year. Either two or three eclipses happen each eclipse season. In the sequence below, each eclipse is separated by a fortnight.

Eclipse season of December 2028–January 2029
December 31 Descending node (full moon)	January 14 Ascending node (new moon)
Total lunar eclipse Lunar Saros 125	Partial solar eclipse Solar Saros 151

== Related eclipses ==
=== Eclipses in 2028 ===
- A partial lunar eclipse on January 12.
- An annular solar eclipse on January 26.
- A partial lunar eclipse on July 6.
- A total solar eclipse on July 22.
- A total lunar eclipse on December 31.

=== Metonic ===
- Preceded by: Lunar eclipse of March 14, 2025
- Followed by: Lunar eclipse of October 18, 2032

=== Tzolkinex ===
- Preceded by: Lunar eclipse of November 19, 2021
- Followed by: Lunar eclipse of February 11, 2036

=== Half-Saros ===
- Preceded by: Solar eclipse of December 26, 2019
- Followed by: Solar eclipse of January 5, 2038

=== Tritos ===
- Preceded by: Lunar eclipse of January 31, 2018
- Followed by: Lunar eclipse of November 30, 2039

=== Lunar Saros 125 ===
- Preceded by: Lunar eclipse of December 21, 2010
- Followed by: Lunar eclipse of January 12, 2047

=== Inex ===
- Preceded by: Lunar eclipse of January 21, 2000
- Followed by: Lunar eclipse of December 11, 2057

=== Triad ===
- Preceded by: Lunar eclipse of March 3, 1942
- Followed by: Lunar eclipse of November 2, 2115

=== Lunar eclipses of 2027–2031 ===
This eclipse is a member of a semester series. An eclipse in a semester series of lunar eclipses repeats approximately every 177 days and 4 hours (a semester) at alternating nodes of the Moon's orbit.

The penumbral lunar eclipses on February 20, 2027 and August 17, 2027 occur in the previous lunar year eclipse set, and the penumbral lunar eclipses on May 7, 2031 and October 30, 2031 occur in the next lunar year eclipse set.

Lunar eclipse series sets from 2027 to 2031
Ascending node				Descending node			
Saros	Date Viewing	Type Chart	Gamma	Saros	Date Viewing	Type Chart	Gamma
110	2027 Jul 18	Penumbral	−1.5759	115	2028 Jan 12	Partial	0.9818
120	2028 Jul 06	Partial	−0.7904	125	2028 Dec 31	Total	0.3258
130	2029 Jun 26	Total	0.0124	135	2029 Dec 20	Total	−0.3811
140	2030 Jun 15	Partial	0.7535	145	2030 Dec 09	Penumbral	−1.0732
150	2031 Jun 05	Penumbral	1.4732				

=== Saros 125 ===
This eclipse is a part of Saros series 125, repeating every 18 years, 11 days, and containing 72 events. The series started with a penumbral lunar eclipse on July 17, 1163. It contains partial eclipses from January 17, 1470 through June 6, 1686; total eclipses from June 17, 1704 through March 19, 2155; and a second set of partial eclipses from March 29, 2173 through June 25, 2317. The series ends at member 72 as a penumbral eclipse on September 9, 2443.

The longest duration of totality was produced by member 37 at 100 minutes, 23 seconds on August 22, 1812. All eclipses in this series occur at the Moon’s descending node of orbit.

Greatest	First			
The greatest eclipse of the series occurred on 1812 Aug 22, lasting 100 minutes, 23 seconds.	Penumbral	Partial	Total	Central
The greatest eclipse of the series occurred on 1812 Aug 22, lasting 100 minutes, 23 seconds.	1163 Jul 17	1470 Jan 17	1704 Jun 17	1758 Jul 20
The greatest eclipse of the series occurred on 1812 Aug 22, lasting 100 minutes, 23 seconds.	Last			
The greatest eclipse of the series occurred on 1812 Aug 22, lasting 100 minutes, 23 seconds.	Central	Total	Partial	Penumbral
The greatest eclipse of the series occurred on 1812 Aug 22, lasting 100 minutes, 23 seconds.	1920 Oct 27	2155 Mar 19	2317 Jun 25	2443 Sep 09

Eclipses are tabulated in three columns; every third eclipse in the same column is one exeligmos apart, so they all cast shadows over approximately the same parts of the Earth.

Series members 37–58 occur between 1801 and 2200:
37	38	39
1812 Aug 22	1830 Sep 02	1848 Sep 13
40	41	42
1866 Sep 24	1884 Oct 04	1902 Oct 17
43	44	45
1920 Oct 27	1938 Nov 07	1956 Nov 18
46	47	48
1974 Nov 29	1992 Dec 09	2010 Dec 21
49	50	51
2028 Dec 31	2047 Jan 12	2065 Jan 22
52	53	54
2083 Feb 02	2101 Feb 14	2119 Feb 25
55	56	57
2137 Mar 07	2155 Mar 19	2173 Mar 29
58
2191 Apr 09

=== Tritos series ===
This eclipse is a part of a tritos cycle, repeating at alternating nodes every 135 synodic months (≈ 3986.63 days, or 11 years minus 1 month). Their appearance and longitude are irregular due to a lack of synchronization with the anomalistic month (period of perigee), but groupings of 3 tritos cycles (≈ 33 years minus 3 months) come close (≈ 434.044 anomalistic months), so eclipses are similar in these groupings.

Series members between 1801 and 2200
1810 Sep 13 (Saros 105)	1821 Aug 13 (Saros 106)	1832 Jul 12 (Saros 107)	1843 Jun 12 (Saros 108)	1854 May 12 (Saros 109)
1865 Apr 11 (Saros 110)	1876 Mar 10 (Saros 111)	1887 Feb 08 (Saros 112)	1898 Jan 08 (Saros 113)	1908 Dec 07 (Saros 114)
1919 Nov 07 (Saros 115)	1930 Oct 07 (Saros 116)	1941 Sep 05 (Saros 117)	1952 Aug 05 (Saros 118)	1963 Jul 06 (Saros 119)
1974 Jun 04 (Saros 120)	1985 May 04 (Saros 121)	1996 Apr 04 (Saros 122)	2007 Mar 03 (Saros 123)	2018 Jan 31 (Saros 124)
2028 Dec 31 (Saros 125)	2039 Nov 30 (Saros 126)	2050 Oct 30 (Saros 127)	2061 Sep 29 (Saros 128)	2072 Aug 28 (Saros 129)
2083 Jul 29 (Saros 130)	2094 Jun 28 (Saros 131)	2105 May 28 (Saros 132)	2116 Apr 27 (Saros 133)	2127 Mar 28 (Saros 134)
2138 Feb 24 (Saros 135)	2149 Jan 23 (Saros 136)	2159 Dec 24 (Saros 137)	2170 Nov 23 (Saros 138)	2181 Oct 22 (Saros 139)
2192 Sep 21 (Saros 140)

=== Inex series ===
This eclipse is a part of the long period inex cycle, repeating at alternating nodes, every 358 synodic months (≈ 10,571.95 days, or 29 years minus 20 days). Their appearance and longitude are irregular due to a lack of synchronization with the anomalistic month (period of perigee). However, groupings of 3 inex cycles (≈ 87 years minus 2 months) comes close (≈ 1,151.02 anomalistic months), so eclipses are similar in these groupings.

Series members between 1801 and 2200
1826 May 21 (Saros 118)	1855 May 02 (Saros 119)	1884 Apr 10 (Saros 120)
1913 Mar 22 (Saros 121)	1942 Mar 03 (Saros 122)	1971 Feb 10 (Saros 123)
2000 Jan 21 (Saros 124)	2028 Dec 31 (Saros 125)	2057 Dec 11 (Saros 126)
2086 Nov 20 (Saros 127)	2115 Nov 02 (Saros 128)	2144 Oct 11 (Saros 129)
2173 Sep 21 (Saros 130)

=== Half-Saros cycle ===
A lunar eclipse will be preceded and followed by solar eclipses by 9 years and 5.5 days (a half saros). This lunar eclipse is related to two annular solar eclipses of Solar Saros 132.

December 26, 2019	January 5, 2038

== See also ==
- List of lunar eclipses and List of 21st-century lunar eclipses
- November 2022 lunar eclipse
