= August 2036 lunar eclipse =

Central lunar eclipse

- Total eclipse
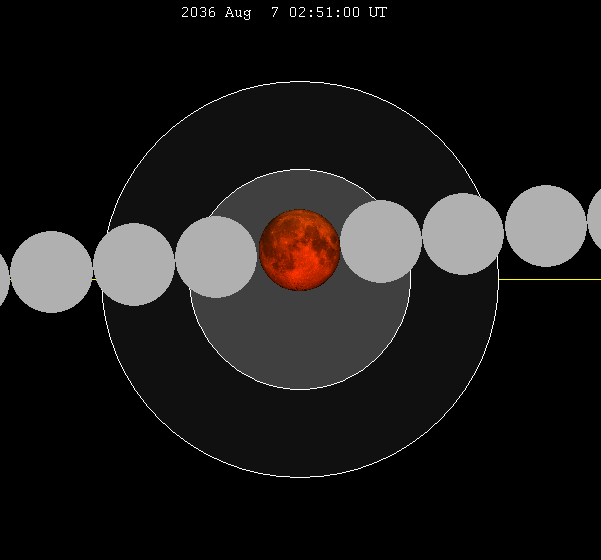
- The Moon's hourly motion shown right to left
- Date: August 6–7, 2036
- Gamma: 0.2004
- Magnitude: 1.4556
- Saros cycle: 129 (39 of 71)
- Totality: 95 minutes, 22 seconds
- Partiality: 241 minutes, 17 seconds
- Penumbral: 372 minutes, 6 seconds
Contacts (UTC)
- P1: 23:46:29 Aug 6
- U1: 0:56:53 Aug 7
- U2: 2:04:53
- Greatest: 2:52:32
- U3: 3:40:11
- U4: 4:48:11
- P4: 5:58:35

A total lunar eclipse will occur at the Moon’s descending node of orbit on Wednesday, August 6 and Thursday, August 7, 2036, with an umbral magnitude of 1.4556. It will be a central lunar eclipse, in which part of the Moon will pass through the center of the Earth's shadow. A lunar eclipse occurs when the Moon moves into the Earth's shadow, causing the Moon to be darkened. A total lunar eclipse occurs when the Moon's near side entirely passes into the Earth's umbral shadow. Unlike a solar eclipse, which can only be viewed from a relatively small area of the world, a lunar eclipse may be viewed from anywhere on the night side of Earth. A total lunar eclipse can last up to nearly two hours, while a total solar eclipse lasts only a few minutes at any given place, because the Moon's shadow is smaller. Occurring only about 11 hours after apogee (on August 6, 2036, at 16:00 UTC), the Moon's apparent diameter will be smaller.

This is the last central lunar eclipse of Saros cycle 129.

== Visibility ==
The eclipse will be completely visible over South America and west Africa, seen rising over much of North America and the eastern Pacific Ocean and setting over Africa, Europe, and west, central, and south Asia.

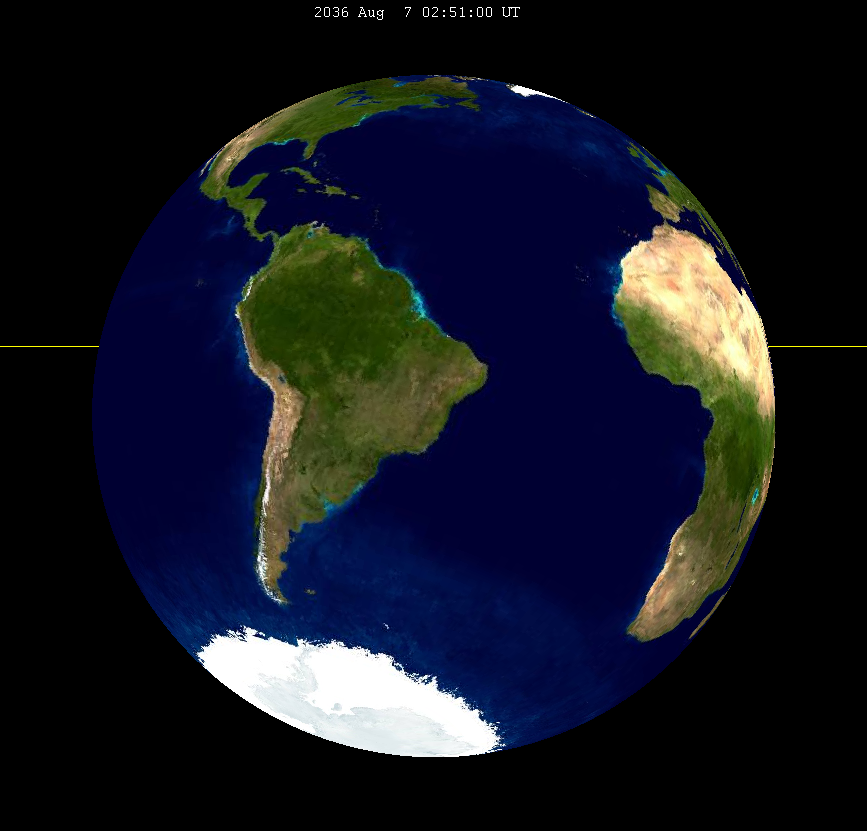
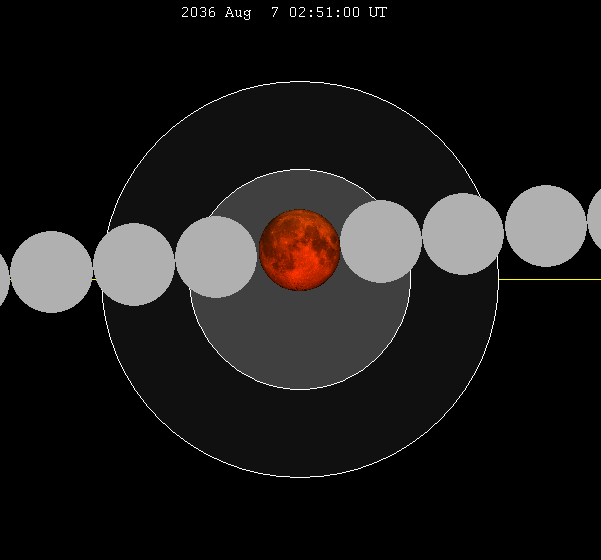

== Eclipse details ==
Shown below is a table displaying details about this particular solar eclipse. It describes various parameters pertaining to this eclipse.

August 7, 2036 lunar eclipse parameters
Parameter	Value
Penumbral magnitude	2.52786
Umbral magnitude	1.45557
Gamma	0.20044
Sun right ascension	09h10m39.1s
Sun declination	+16°16'20.8"
Sun semi-diameter	15'46.3"
Sun equatorial horizontal parallax	08.7"
Moon right ascension	21h10m30.3s
Moon declination	-16°05'44.3"
Moon semi-diameter	14'42.5"
Moon equatorial horizontal parallax	0°53'58.8"
ΔT	77.2 s

== Eclipse season ==
This eclipse is part of an eclipse season, a period, roughly every six months, when eclipses occur. Only two (or occasionally three) eclipse seasons occur each year, and each season lasts about 35 days and repeats just short of six months (173 days) later; thus two full eclipse seasons always occur each year. Either two or three eclipses happen each eclipse season. In the sequence below, each eclipse is separated by a fortnight. The first and last eclipse in this sequence is separated by one synodic month.

Eclipse season of July–August 2036
July 23 Ascending node (new moon)	August 7 Descending node (full moon)	August 21 Ascending node (new moon)
Partial solar eclipse Solar Saros 117	Total lunar eclipse Lunar Saros 129	Partial solar eclipse Solar Saros 155

== Related eclipses ==
=== Eclipses in 2036 ===
- A total lunar eclipse on February 11
- A partial solar eclipse on February 27
- A partial solar eclipse on July 23
- A total lunar eclipse on August 7
- A partial solar eclipse on August 21

=== Metonic ===
- Preceded by: Lunar eclipse of October 18, 2032
- Followed by: Lunar eclipse of May 26, 2040

=== Tzolkinex ===
- Preceded by: Lunar eclipse of June 26, 2029
- Followed by: Lunar eclipse of September 19, 2043

=== Half-Saros ===
- Preceded by: Solar eclipse of August 2, 2027
- Followed by: Solar eclipse of August 12, 2045

=== Tritos ===
- Preceded by: Lunar eclipse of September 7, 2025
- Followed by: Lunar eclipse of July 7, 2047

=== Lunar Saros 129 ===
- Preceded by: Lunar eclipse of July 27, 2018
- Followed by: Lunar eclipse of August 18, 2054

=== Inex ===
- Preceded by: Lunar eclipse of August 28, 2007
- Followed by: Lunar eclipse of July 17, 2065

=== Triad ===
- Preceded by: Lunar eclipse of October 7, 1949
- Followed by: Lunar eclipse of June 9, 2123

=== Lunar eclipses of 2035–2038 ===
This eclipse is a member of a semester series. An eclipse in a semester series of lunar eclipses repeats approximately every 177 days and 4 hours (a semester) at alternating nodes of the Moon's orbit.

The penumbral lunar eclipses on June 17, 2038 and December 11, 2038 occur in the next lunar year eclipse set.

Lunar eclipse series sets from 2035 to 2038
Ascending node				Descending node			
Saros	Date Viewing	Type Chart	Gamma	Saros	Date Viewing	Type Chart	Gamma
114	2035 Feb 22	Penumbral	−1.0357	119	2035 Aug 19	Partial	0.9433
124	2036 Feb 11	Total	−0.3110	129	2036 Aug 07	Total	0.2004
134	2037 Jan 31	Total	0.3619	139	2037 Jul 27	Partial	−0.5582
144	2038 Jan 21	Penumbral	1.0710	149	2038 Jul 16	Penumbral	−1.2837

=== Saros 129 ===
This eclipse is a part of Saros series 129, repeating every 18 years, 11 days, and containing 71 events. The series started with a penumbral lunar eclipse on June 10, 1351. It contains partial eclipses from September 26, 1531 through May 11, 1892; total eclipses from May 24, 1910 through September 8, 2090; and a second set of partial eclipses from September 20, 2108 through April 26, 2469. The series ends at member 71 as a penumbral eclipse on July 24, 2613.

The longest duration of totality was produced by member 37 at 106 minutes, 24 seconds on July 16, 2000. All eclipses in this series occur at the Moon’s descending node of orbit.

Greatest	First			
The greatest eclipse of the series occurred on 2000 Jul 16, lasting 106 minutes, 24 seconds.	Penumbral	Partial	Total	Central
The greatest eclipse of the series occurred on 2000 Jul 16, lasting 106 minutes, 24 seconds.	1351 Jun 10	1531 Sep 26	1910 May 24	1946 Jun 14
The greatest eclipse of the series occurred on 2000 Jul 16, lasting 106 minutes, 24 seconds.	Last			
The greatest eclipse of the series occurred on 2000 Jul 16, lasting 106 minutes, 24 seconds.	Central	Total	Partial	Penumbral
The greatest eclipse of the series occurred on 2000 Jul 16, lasting 106 minutes, 24 seconds.	2036 Aug 07	2090 Sep 08	2469 Apr 26	2613 Jul 24

Eclipses are tabulated in three columns; every third eclipse in the same column is one exeligmos apart, so they all cast shadows over approximately the same parts of the Earth.

Series members 26–48 occur between 1801 and 2200:
26	27	28
1802 Mar 19	1820 Mar 29	1838 Apr 10
29	30	31
1856 Apr 20	1874 May 01	1892 May 11
32	33	34
1910 May 24	1928 Jun 03	1946 Jun 14
35	36	37
1964 Jun 25	1982 Jul 06	2000 Jul 16
38	39	40
2018 Jul 27	2036 Aug 07	2054 Aug 18
41	42	43
2072 Aug 28	2090 Sep 08	2108 Sep 20
44	45	46
2126 Oct 01	2144 Oct 11	2162 Oct 23
47	48	
2180 Nov 02	2198 Nov 13	

=== Tritos series ===
This eclipse is a part of a tritos cycle, repeating at alternating nodes every 135 synodic months (≈ 3986.63 days, or 11 years minus 1 month). Their appearance and longitude are irregular due to a lack of synchronization with the anomalistic month (period of perigee), but groupings of 3 tritos cycles (≈ 33 years minus 3 months) come close (≈ 434.044 anomalistic months), so eclipses are similar in these groupings.

Series members between 1801 and 2200
1807 May 21 (Saros 108)	1818 Apr 21 (Saros 109)	1829 Mar 20 (Saros 110)	1840 Feb 17 (Saros 111)	1851 Jan 17 (Saros 112)
1861 Dec 17 (Saros 113)	1872 Nov 15 (Saros 114)	1883 Oct 16 (Saros 115)	1894 Sep 15 (Saros 116)	1905 Aug 15 (Saros 117)
1916 Jul 15 (Saros 118)	1927 Jun 15 (Saros 119)	1938 May 14 (Saros 120)	1949 Apr 13 (Saros 121)	1960 Mar 13 (Saros 122)
1971 Feb 10 (Saros 123)	1982 Jan 09 (Saros 124)	1992 Dec 09 (Saros 125)	2003 Nov 09 (Saros 126)	2014 Oct 08 (Saros 127)
2025 Sep 07 (Saros 128)	2036 Aug 07 (Saros 129)	2047 Jul 07 (Saros 130)	2058 Jun 06 (Saros 131)	2069 May 06 (Saros 132)
2080 Apr 04 (Saros 133)	2091 Mar 05 (Saros 134)	2102 Feb 03 (Saros 135)	2113 Jan 02 (Saros 136)	2123 Dec 03 (Saros 137)
2134 Nov 02 (Saros 138)	2145 Sep 30 (Saros 139)	2156 Aug 30 (Saros 140)	2167 Aug 01 (Saros 141)	2178 Jun 30 (Saros 142)
2189 May 29 (Saros 143)	2200 Apr 30 (Saros 144)			

=== Inex series ===
This eclipse is a part of the long period inex cycle, repeating at alternating nodes, every 358 synodic months (≈ 10,571.95 days, or 29 years minus 20 days). Their appearance and longitude are irregular due to a lack of synchronization with the anomalistic month (period of perigee). However, groupings of 3 inex cycles (≈ 87 years minus 2 months) comes close (≈ 1,151.02 anomalistic months), so eclipses are similar in these groupings.

Series members between 1801 and 2200
1805 Jan 15 (Saros 121)	1833 Dec 26 (Saros 122)	1862 Dec 06 (Saros 123)
1891 Nov 16 (Saros 124)	1920 Oct 27 (Saros 125)	1949 Oct 07 (Saros 126)
1978 Sep 16 (Saros 127)	2007 Aug 28 (Saros 128)	2036 Aug 07 (Saros 129)
2065 Jul 17 (Saros 130)	2094 Jun 28 (Saros 131)	2123 Jun 09 (Saros 132)
2152 May 18 (Saros 133)	2181 Apr 29 (Saros 134)	

=== Half-Saros cycle ===
A lunar eclipse will be preceded and followed by solar eclipses by 9 years and 5.5 days (a half saros). This lunar eclipse is related to two total solar eclipses of Solar Saros 136.

August 2, 2027	August 12, 2045

== See also ==
- List of lunar eclipses and List of 21st-century lunar eclipses
