= Solar Saros 131 =

Saros cycle series 131 for solar eclipses

Historic saros cycle animation

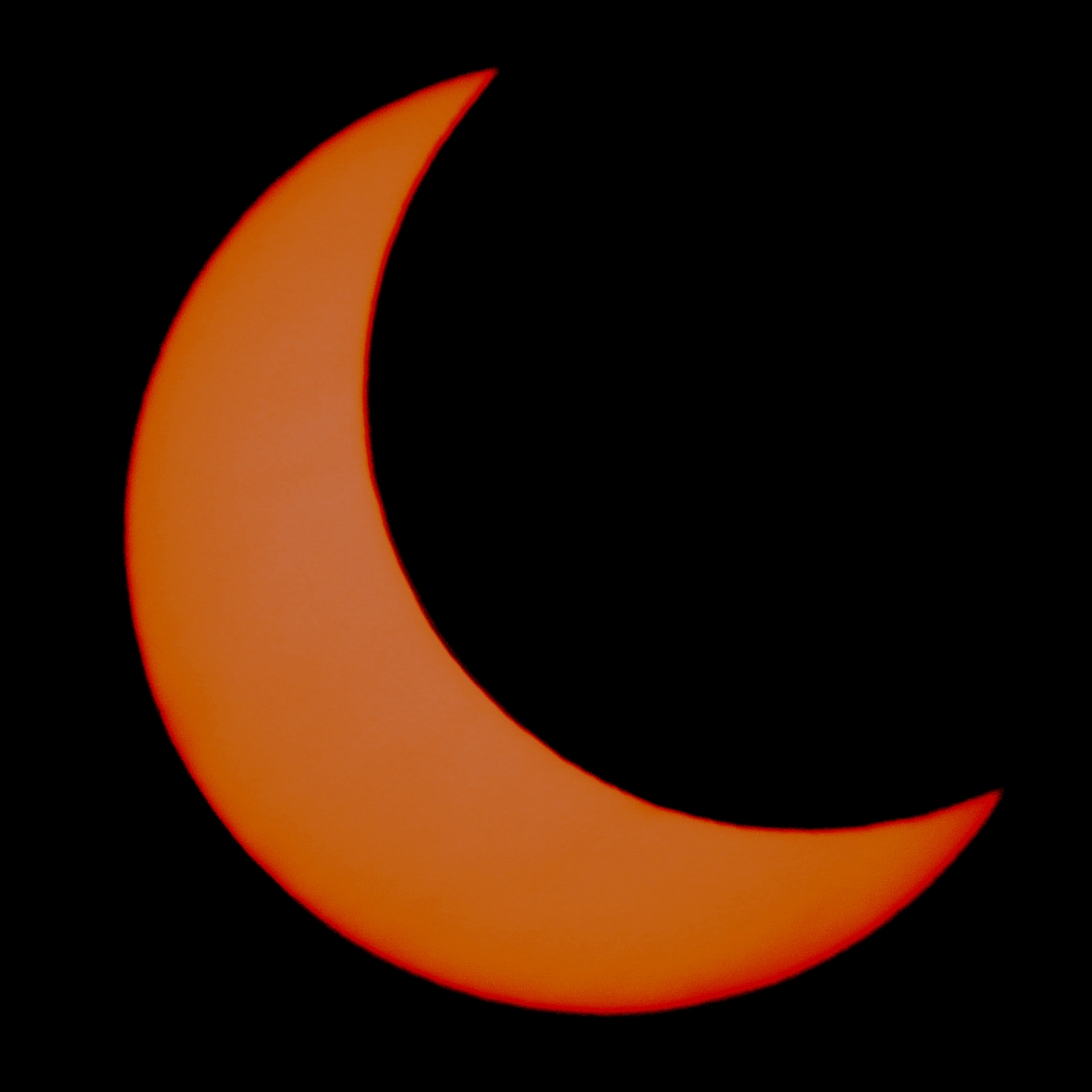
January 26, 2009 Partially of an annular event from Riversdale, South Africa Series member 50

Saros cycle series 131 for solar eclipses occurs at the Moon's ascending node, repeating every 18 years, 11 days, containing 70 eclipses, 41 of which are umbral (6 total, 5 hybrid, 30 annular). The first eclipse in the series was on 1 August 1125 and the last will be on 2 September 2369. The most recent eclipse was an annular eclipse on 26 January 2009 and the next eclipse will be an annular eclipse on 6 February 2027.

The longest totality was 58 seconds on 30 May 1612 and the longest annular was 7 minutes 54 seconds on 26 January 2009.

This solar saros is linked to Lunar Saros 124.

== Umbral eclipses ==
Umbral eclipses (annular, total and hybrid) can be further classified as either: 1) Central (two limits), 2) Central (one limit) or 3) Non-Central (one limit). The statistical distribution of these classes in Saros series 131 appears in the following table.

Classification	Number	Percent
All Umbral eclipses	41	100.00%
Central (two limits)	41	100.00%
Central (one limit)	0	0.00%
Non-central (one limit)	0	0.00%

== All eclipses ==
Note: Dates are given in the Julian calendar prior to 15 October 1582, and in the Gregorian calendar after that.

Saros	Member	Date	Time (Greatest) UTC	Type	Location Lat, Long	Gamma	Mag.	Width (km)	Duration (min:sec)	Ref
131	1	August 1, 1125	5:15:09	Partial	69.9N 109.5W	1.4666	0.1198			
131	2	August 12, 1143	12:57:36	Partial	70.7N 121.9E	1.4088	0.2324			
131	3	August 22, 1161	20:46:37	Partial	71.3N 8.8W	1.3564	0.334			
131	4	September 3, 1179	4:42:14	Partial	71.7N 141.7W	1.3096	0.4241			
131	5	September 13, 1197	12:45:54	Partial	71.9N 83.1E	1.2695	0.5009			
131	6	September 24, 1215	20:55:57	Partial	71.9N 53.7W	1.2351	0.5664			
131	7	October 5, 1233	5:14:34	Partial	71.6N 167.4E	1.208	0.6174			
131	8	October 16, 1251	13:39:20	Partial	71N 27.4E	1.1863	0.6578			
131	9	October 26, 1269	22:11:15	Partial	70.3N 113.8W	1.1708	0.6862			
131	10	November 7, 1287	6:48:15	Partial	69.4N 104.2E	1.16	0.7059			
131	11	November 17, 1305	15:30:56	Partial	68.4N 38.4W	1.154	0.7163			
131	12	November 29, 1323	0:16:11	Partial	67.3N 178.8E	1.1509	0.7215			
131	13	December 9, 1341	9:03:29	Partial	66.3N 36.2E	1.15	0.7229			
131	14	December 20, 1359	17:50:58	Partial	65.2N 106W	1.1496	0.7231			
131	15	December 31, 1377	2:38:10	Partial	64.3N 112.2E	1.1494	0.7234			
131	16	January 11, 1396	11:21:14	Partial	63.4N 28.1W	1.1464	0.7287			
131	17	January 21, 1414	20:00:46	Partial	62.6N 167.3W	1.1411	0.7384			
131	18	February 2, 1432	4:33:42	Partial	62N 55.4E	1.1309	0.7571			
131	19	February 12, 1450	13:01:23	Partial	61.5N 80.5W	1.1169	0.7829			
131	20	February 23, 1468	21:18:55	Partial	61.2N 146.3E	1.0953	0.8228			
131	21	March 6, 1486	5:30:00	Partial	61N 14.7E	1.0689	0.8714			
131	22	March 16, 1504	13:30:09	Partial	61N 114W	1.0345	0.9348			
131	23	March 27, 1522	21:22:59	Total	62N 127.7E	0.9946	1.0076	347	0m 26s	
131	24	April 7, 1540	5:04:30	Total	63.1N 34.7E	0.9462	1.0115	123	0m 42s	
131	25	April 18, 1558	12:39:27	Total	64.1N 67.8W	0.893	1.0132	100	0m 50s	
131	26	April 28, 1576	20:04:44	Total	64.8N 168W	0.8328	1.014	86	0m 55s	
131	27	May 20, 1594	3:23:17	Total	64.9N 94.1E	0.7678	1.0141	76	0m 58s	
131	28	May 30, 1612	10:34:29	Total	63.6N 1.9W	0.6976	1.0135	65	0m 58s	
131	29	June 10, 1630	17:41:07	Hybrid	60.9N 98.3W	0.6244	1.0122	54	0m 55s	
131	30	June 21, 1648	0:43:22	Hybrid	56.7N 164E	0.5483	1.0102	42	0m 49s	
131	31	July 2, 1666	7:42:30	Hybrid	51.4N 64.4E	0.4704	1.0075	29	0m 39s	
131	32	July 12, 1684	14:40:35	Hybrid	45.2N 37.1W	0.3926	1.0041	16	0m 23s	
131	33	July 24, 1702	21:38:51	Hybrid	38.4N 140.4W	0.316	1.0001	1	0m 1s	
131	34	August 4, 1720	4:38:15	Annular	31.1N 114.8E	0.2409	0.9957	16	0m 27s	
131	35	August 15, 1738	11:40:12	Annular	23.7N 8.4E	0.1688	0.9907	33	1m 0s	
131	36	August 25, 1756	18:46:17	Annular	16.1N 99.5W	0.1009	0.9853	52	1m 38s	
131	37	September 6, 1774	1:57:40	Annular	8.7N 150.9E	0.0385	0.9797	72	2m 20s	
131	38	September 16, 1792	9:13:52	Annular	1.3N 39.9E	-0.0191	0.9739	93	3m 2s	
131	39	September 28, 1810	16:37:25	Annular	5.8S 72.8W	-0.0696	0.9681	115	3m 45s	
131	40	October 9, 1828	0:07:47	Annular	12.5S 173E	-0.1139	0.9623	137	4m 26s	
131	41	October 20, 1846	7:46:12	Annular	18.7S 57.3E	-0.1506	0.9567	159	5m 5s	
131	42	October 30, 1864	15:30:31	Annular	24.3S 59.3W	-0.1816	0.9514	181	5m 41s	
131	43	November 10, 1882	23:22:21	Annular	29.2S 177W	-0.2056	0.9465	201	6m 14s	
131	44	November 22, 1900	7:19:43	Annular	33.1S 64.8E	-0.2245	0.9421	220	6m 42s	
131	45	December 3, 1918	15:22:02	Annular	36.1S 53.7W	-0.2387	0.9383	236	7m 6s	
131	46	December 13, 1936	23:28:12	Annular	37.8S 172.6W	-0.2493	0.9349	251	7m 25s	
131	47	December 25, 1954	7:36:42	Annular	38.4S 68.2E	-0.2576	0.9323	262	7m 39s	
131	48	January 4, 1973	15:46:21	Annular	37.9S 51.2W	-0.2644	0.9303	271	7m 49s	
131	49	January 15, 1991	23:53:51	Annular	36.4S 170.4W	-0.2727	0.929	277	7m 53s	
131	50	January 26, 2009	7:59:45	Annular	34.1S 70.2E	-0.282	0.9282	280	7m 54s	
131	51	February 6, 2027	16:00:48	Annular	31.3S 48.5W	-0.2952	0.9281	282	7m 51s	
131	52	February 16, 2045	23:56:07	Annular	28.3S 166.2W	-0.3125	0.9285	281	7m 47s	
131	53	February 28, 2063	7:43:30	Annular	25.2S 77.7E	-0.336	0.9293	280	7m 41s	
131	54	March 10, 2081	15:23:31	Annular	22.4S 36.7W	-0.3653	0.9304	277	7m 36s	
131	55	March 21, 2099	22:54:32	Annular	20S 149W	-0.4016	0.9318	275	7m 32s	
131	56	April 2, 2117	6:15:20	Annular	18.4S 101.1E	-0.4459	0.9333	274	7m 30s	
131	57	April 13, 2135	13:27:05	Annular	17.6S 6.5W	-0.4973	0.9349	274	7m 30s	
131	58	April 23, 2153	20:29:24	Annular	17.9S 111.8W	-0.5557	0.9364	279	7m 31s	
131	59	May 5, 2171	3:23:15	Annular	19.4S 144.8E	-0.6209	0.9378	289	7m 32s	
131	60	May 15, 2189	10:08:34	Annular	22.6S 43.3E	-0.6928	0.9387	309	7m 31s	
131	61	May 27, 2207	16:47:47	Annular	27.5S 57W	-0.7692	0.9393	347	7m 25s	
131	62	June 6, 2225	23:21:31	Annular	34.6S 156.5W	-0.8496	0.9392	425	7m 10s	
131	63	June 18, 2243	5:49:56	Annular	45.6S 104.7E	-0.9342	0.938	652	6m 41s	
131	64	June 28, 2261	12:16:28	Partial	66.6S 6E	-1.0198	0.9282			
131	65	July 9, 2279	18:41:13	Partial	67.7S 100.7W	-1.1065	0.7802			
131	66	July 20, 2297	1:07:47	Partial	68.7S 151.6E	-1.1915	0.6346			
131	67	August 1, 2315	7:34:32	Partial	69.6S 43.3E	-1.2761	0.4898			
131	68	August 11, 2333	14:06:48	Partial	70.5S 66.9W	-1.3558	0.3534			
131	69	August 22, 2351	20:42:47	Partial	71.2S 178.6W	-1.4322	0.2228			
131	70	September 2, 2369	3:25:56	Partial	71.7S 67.4E	-1.5027	0.1025			
