= May 1910 lunar eclipse =

Total lunar eclipse in 1910

- Total eclipse
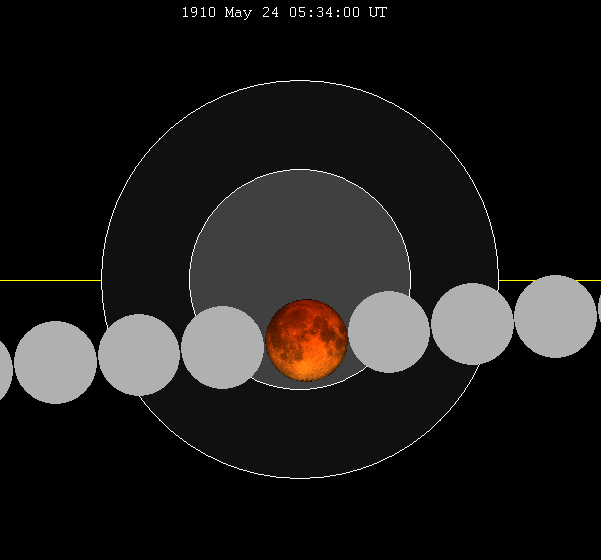
- The Moon's hourly motion shown right to left
- Date: May 24, 1910
- Gamma: −0.3976
- Magnitude: 1.0950
- Saros cycle: 129 (32 of 71)
- Totality: 49 minutes, 30 seconds
- Partiality: 215 minutes, 21 seconds
- Penumbral: 360 minutes, 20 seconds
Contacts (UTC)
- P1: 2:33:54
- U1: 3:46:25
- U2: 5:09:21
- Greatest: 5:34:05
- U3: 5:58:50
- U4: 7:21:46
- P4: 8:34:14

A total lunar eclipse occurred at the Moon’s descending node of orbit on Tuesday, May 24, 1910, with an umbral magnitude of 1.0950. A lunar eclipse occurs when the Moon moves into the Earth's shadow, causing the Moon to be darkened. A total lunar eclipse occurs when the Moon's near side entirely passes into the Earth's umbral shadow. Unlike a solar eclipse, which can only be viewed from a relatively small area of the world, a lunar eclipse may be viewed from anywhere on the night side of Earth. A total lunar eclipse can last up to nearly two hours, while a total solar eclipse lasts only a few minutes at any given place, because the Moon's shadow is smaller. Occurring about 2.4 days after apogee (on May 21, 1910, at 18:30 UTC), the Moon's apparent diameter was smaller.

This lunar eclipse was the third of a tetrad, with four total lunar eclipses in series, the others being on June 4, 1909; November 27, 1909; and November 17, 1910.

== Visibility ==
The eclipse was completely visible over much of North America, South America, and Antarctica, seen rising over northwestern North America, eastern Australia, and the central Pacific Ocean and setting over Africa and Europe.

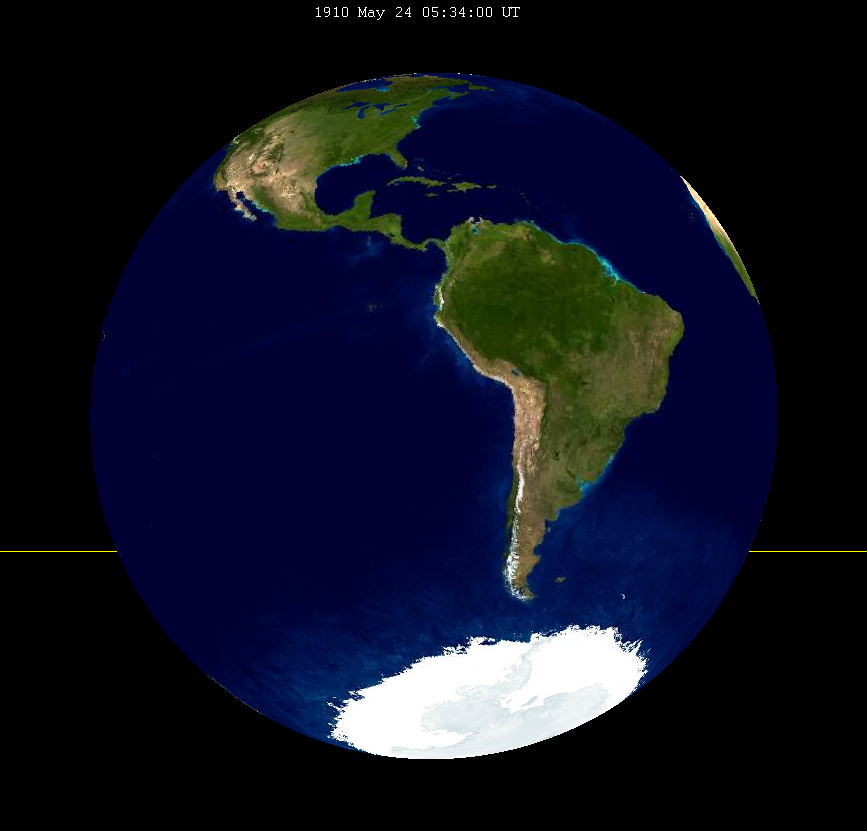
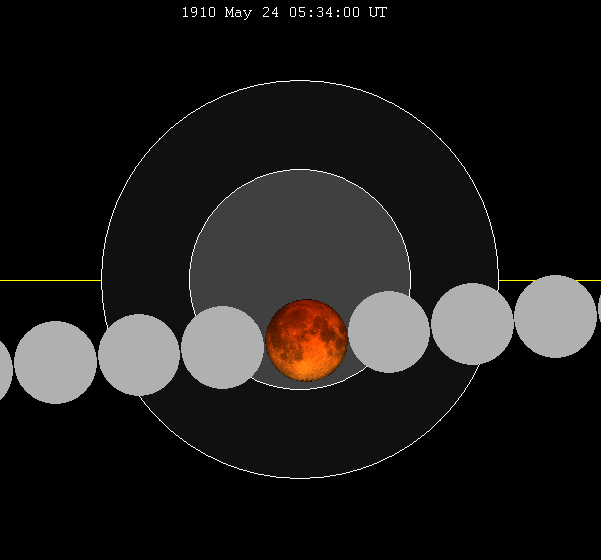

== Eclipse details ==
Shown below is a table displaying details about this particular solar eclipse. It describes various parameters pertaining to this eclipse.

May 24, 1910 Lunar Eclipse Parameters
Parameter	Value
Penumbral Magnitude	2.16249
Umbral Magnitude	1.09503
Gamma	−0.39758
Sun Right Ascension	04h00m18.2s
Sun Declination	+20°36'19.8"
Sun Semi-Diameter	15'47.5"
Sun Equatorial Horizontal Parallax	08.7"
Moon Right Ascension	15h59m50.9s
Moon Declination	-20°56'56.9"
Moon Semi-Diameter	14'47.6"
Moon Equatorial Horizontal Parallax	0°54'17.6"
ΔT	10.9 s

== Eclipse season ==
This eclipse is part of an eclipse season, a period, roughly every six months, when eclipses occur. Only two (or occasionally three) eclipse seasons occur each year, and each season lasts about 35 days and repeats just short of six months (173 days) later; thus two full eclipse seasons always occur each year. Either two or three eclipses happen each eclipse season. In the sequence below, each eclipse is separated by a fortnight. The first and last eclipse in this sequence is separated by one synodic month.

Eclipse season of May 1910
May 9 Ascending node (new moon)	May 24 Descending node (full moon)
Total solar eclipse Solar Saros 117	Total lunar eclipse Lunar Saros 129

== Related eclipses ==
=== Eclipses in 1910 ===
- A total solar eclipse on May 9.
- A total lunar eclipse on May 24.
- A partial solar eclipse on November 2.
- A total lunar eclipse on November 17.

=== Metonic ===
- Preceded by: Lunar eclipse of August 4, 1906
- Followed by: Lunar eclipse of March 12, 1914

=== Tzolkinex ===
- Preceded by: Lunar eclipse of April 12, 1903
- Followed by: Lunar eclipse of July 4, 1917

=== Half-Saros ===
- Preceded by: Solar eclipse of May 18, 1901
- Followed by: Solar eclipse of May 29, 1919

=== Tritos ===
- Preceded by: Lunar eclipse of June 23, 1899
- Followed by: Lunar eclipse of April 22, 1921

=== Lunar Saros 129 ===
- Preceded by: Lunar eclipse of May 11, 1892
- Followed by: Lunar eclipse of June 3, 1928

=== Inex ===
- Preceded by: Lunar eclipse of June 12, 1881
- Followed by: Lunar eclipse of May 3, 1939

=== Triad ===
- Preceded by: Lunar eclipse of July 23, 1823
- Followed by: Lunar eclipse of March 24, 1997

=== Lunar eclipses of 1908–1911 ===
This eclipse is a member of a semester series. An eclipse in a semester series of lunar eclipses repeats approximately every 177 days and 4 hours (a semester) at alternating nodes of the Moon's orbit.

The penumbral lunar eclipses on January 18, 1908 and July 13, 1908 occur in the previous lunar year eclipse set.

Lunar eclipse series sets from 1908 to 1911
Descending node				Ascending node			
Saros	Date Viewing	Type Chart	Gamma	Saros	Date Viewing	Type Chart	Gamma
109	1908 Jun 14	Penumbral	1.1053	114	1908 Dec 07	Penumbral	−1.0059
119	1909 Jun 04	Total	0.3755	124	1909 Nov 27	Total	−0.2712
129	1910 May 24	Total	−0.3975	134	1910 Nov 17	Total	0.4089
139	1911 May 13	Penumbral	−1.1413	144	1911 Nov 06	Penumbral	1.1100

=== Saros 129 ===
This eclipse is a part of Saros series 129, repeating every 18 years, 11 days, and containing 71 events. The series started with a penumbral lunar eclipse on June 10, 1351. It contains partial eclipses from September 26, 1531 through May 11, 1892; total eclipses from May 24, 1910 through September 8, 2090; and a second set of partial eclipses from September 20, 2108 through April 26, 2469. The series ends at member 71 as a penumbral eclipse on July 24, 2613.

The longest duration of totality was produced by member 37 at 106 minutes, 24 seconds on July 16, 2000. All eclipses in this series occur at the Moon’s descending node of orbit.

Greatest	First			
The greatest eclipse of the series occurred on 2000 Jul 16, lasting 106 minutes, 24 seconds.	Penumbral	Partial	Total	Central
The greatest eclipse of the series occurred on 2000 Jul 16, lasting 106 minutes, 24 seconds.	1351 Jun 10	1531 Sep 26	1910 May 24	1946 Jun 14
The greatest eclipse of the series occurred on 2000 Jul 16, lasting 106 minutes, 24 seconds.	Last			
The greatest eclipse of the series occurred on 2000 Jul 16, lasting 106 minutes, 24 seconds.	Central	Total	Partial	Penumbral
The greatest eclipse of the series occurred on 2000 Jul 16, lasting 106 minutes, 24 seconds.	2036 Aug 07	2090 Sep 08	2469 Apr 26	2613 Jul 24

Eclipses are tabulated in three columns; every third eclipse in the same column is one exeligmos apart, so they all cast shadows over approximately the same parts of the Earth.

Series members 26–48 occur between 1801 and 2200:
26	27	28
1802 Mar 19	1820 Mar 29	1838 Apr 10
29	30	31
1856 Apr 20	1874 May 01	1892 May 11
32	33	34
1910 May 24	1928 Jun 03	1946 Jun 14
35	36	37
1964 Jun 25	1982 Jul 06	2000 Jul 16
38	39	40
2018 Jul 27	2036 Aug 07	2054 Aug 18
41	42	43
2072 Aug 28	2090 Sep 08	2108 Sep 20
44	45	46
2126 Oct 01	2144 Oct 11	2162 Oct 23
47	48	
2180 Nov 02	2198 Nov 13	

=== Tritos series ===
This eclipse is a part of a tritos cycle, repeating at alternating nodes every 135 synodic months (≈ 3986.63 days, or 11 years minus 1 month). Their appearance and longitude are irregular due to a lack of synchronization with the anomalistic month (period of perigee), but groupings of 3 tritos cycles (≈ 33 years minus 3 months) come close (≈ 434.044 anomalistic months), so eclipses are similar in these groupings.

Series members between 1801 and 2200
1801 Mar 30 (Saros 119)	1812 Feb 27 (Saros 120)	1823 Jan 26 (Saros 121)	1833 Dec 26 (Saros 122)	1844 Nov 24 (Saros 123)
1855 Oct 25 (Saros 124)	1866 Sep 24 (Saros 125)	1877 Aug 23 (Saros 126)	1888 Jul 23 (Saros 127)	1899 Jun 23 (Saros 128)
1910 May 24 (Saros 129)	1921 Apr 22 (Saros 130)	1932 Mar 22 (Saros 131)	1943 Feb 20 (Saros 132)	1954 Jan 19 (Saros 133)
1964 Dec 19 (Saros 134)	1975 Nov 18 (Saros 135)	1986 Oct 17 (Saros 136)	1997 Sep 16 (Saros 137)	2008 Aug 16 (Saros 138)
2019 Jul 16 (Saros 139)	2030 Jun 15 (Saros 140)	2041 May 16 (Saros 141)	2052 Apr 14 (Saros 142)	2063 Mar 14 (Saros 143)
2074 Feb 11 (Saros 144)	2085 Jan 10 (Saros 145)	2095 Dec 11 (Saros 146)	2106 Nov 11 (Saros 147)	2117 Oct 10 (Saros 148)
2128 Sep 09 (Saros 149)	2139 Aug 10 (Saros 150)	2150 Jul 09 (Saros 151)	2161 Jun 08 (Saros 152)	2172 May 08 (Saros 153)
	2194 Mar 07 (Saros 155)			

=== Inex series ===
This eclipse is a part of the long period inex cycle, repeating at alternating nodes, every 358 synodic months (≈ 10,571.95 days, or 29 years minus 20 days). Their appearance and longitude are irregular due to a lack of synchronization with the anomalistic month (period of perigee). However, groupings of 3 inex cycles (≈ 87 years minus 2 months) comes close (≈ 1,151.02 anomalistic months), so eclipses are similar in these groupings.

Series members between 1801 and 2200
1823 Jul 23 (Saros 126)	1852 Jul 01 (Saros 127)	1881 Jun 12 (Saros 128)
1910 May 24 (Saros 129)	1939 May 03 (Saros 130)	1968 Apr 13 (Saros 131)
1997 Mar 24 (Saros 132)	2026 Mar 03 (Saros 133)	2055 Feb 11 (Saros 134)
2084 Jan 22 (Saros 135)	2113 Jan 02 (Saros 136)	2141 Dec 13 (Saros 137)
2170 Nov 23 (Saros 138)	2199 Nov 02 (Saros 139)	

=== Half-Saros cycle ===
A lunar eclipse will be preceded and followed by solar eclipses by 9 years and 5.5 days (a half saros). This lunar eclipse is related to two total solar eclipses of Solar Saros 136.

May 18, 1901	May 29, 1919

== See also ==
- List of lunar eclipses
- List of 20th-century lunar eclipses
