= June 1928 lunar eclipse =

Total lunar eclipse June 3, 1928

- Total eclipse
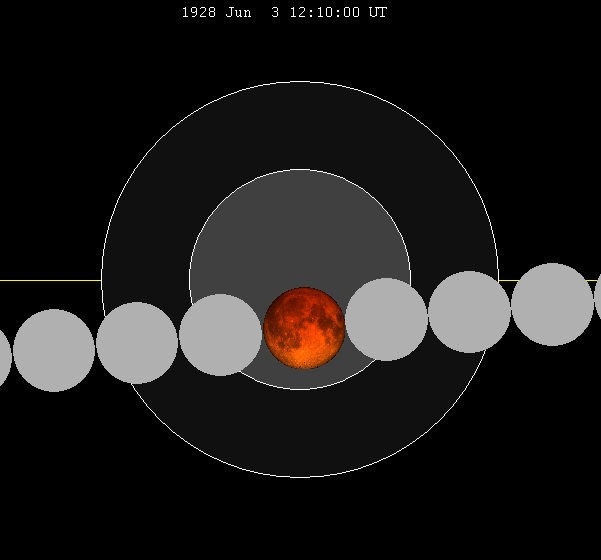
- The Moon's hourly motion shown right to left
- Date: June 3, 1928
- Gamma: −0.3175
- Magnitude: 1.2421
- Saros cycle: 128 (33 of 71)
- Totality: 75 minutes, 16 seconds
- Partiality: 222 minutes, 58 seconds
- Penumbral: 365 minutes, 11 seconds
Contacts (UTC)
- P1: 9:06:57
- U1: 10:18:05
- U2: 11:31:55
- Greatest: 12:09:33
- U3: 12:47:12
- U4: 14:01:03
- P4: 15:12:08

A total lunar eclipse occurred at the Moon’s ascending node of orbit on Sunday, June 3, 1928, with an umbral magnitude of 1.2421. A lunar eclipse occurs when the Moon moves into the Earth's shadow, causing the Moon to be darkened. A total lunar eclipse occurs when the Moon's near side entirely passes into the Earth's umbral shadow. Unlike a solar eclipse, which can only be viewed from a relatively small area of the world, a lunar eclipse may be viewed from anywhere on the night side of Earth. A total lunar eclipse can last up to nearly two hours, while a total solar eclipse lasts only a few minutes at any given place, because the Moon's shadow is smaller. Occurring only about 2.1 days after apogee (on June 1, 1928, at 9:00 UTC), the Moon's apparent diameter was smaller.

This lunar eclipse was the third of a tetrad, with four total lunar eclipses in series, the others being on June 15, 1927; December 8, 1927; and November 27, 1928.

== Visibility ==
The eclipse was completely visible over Australia, Antarctica, and the central Pacific Ocean, seen rising over south and east Asia and setting over North and South America.

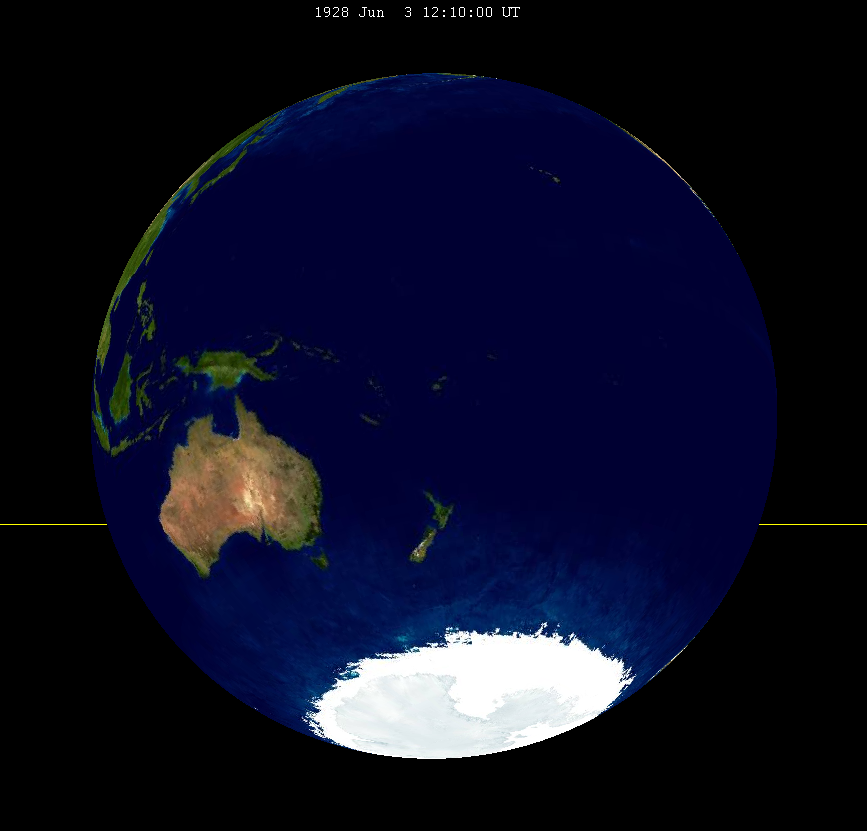
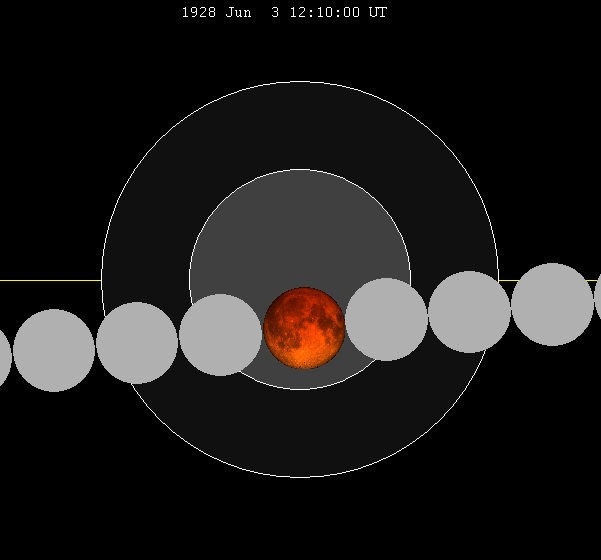

== Eclipse details ==
Shown below is a table displaying details about this particular lunar eclipse. It describes various parameters pertaining to this eclipse.

June 3, 1928 Lunar Eclipse Parameters
Parameter	Value
Penumbral Magnitude	2.30920
Umbral Magnitude	1.24213
Gamma	−0.31752
Sun Right Ascension	04h44m44.7s
Sun Declination	+22°19'20.2"
Sun Semi-Diameter	15'45.9"
Sun Equatorial Horizontal Parallax	08.7"
Moon Right Ascension	16h44m27.8s
Moon Declination	-22°36'06.1"
Moon Semi-Diameter	14'46.4"
Moon Equatorial Horizontal Parallax	0°54'13.2"
ΔT	24.2 s

== Eclipse season ==
This eclipse is part of an eclipse season, a period, roughly every six months, when eclipses occur. Only two (or occasionally three) eclipse seasons occur each year, and each season lasts about 35 days and repeats just short of six months (173 days) later; thus two full eclipse seasons always occur each year. Either two or three eclipses happen each eclipse season. In the sequence below, each eclipse is separated by a fortnight. The first and last eclipse in this sequence is separated by one synodic month.

Eclipse season of May–June 1928
May 19 Ascending node (new moon)	June 3 Descending node (full moon)	June 17 Ascending node (new moon)
Total solar eclipse Solar Saros 117	Total lunar eclipse Lunar Saros 129	Partial solar eclipse Solar Saros 155

== Related eclipses ==
=== Eclipses in 1928 ===
- A non-central total solar eclipse on May 19.
- A total lunar eclipse on June 3.
- A partial solar eclipse on June 17.
- A partial solar eclipse on November 12.
- A total lunar eclipse on November 27.

=== Metonic ===
- Preceded by: Lunar eclipse of August 14, 1924
- Followed by: Lunar eclipse of March 22, 1932

=== Tzolkinex ===
- Preceded by: Lunar eclipse of April 22, 1921
- Followed by: Lunar eclipse of July 16, 1935

=== Half-Saros ===
- Preceded by: Solar eclipse of May 29, 1919
- Followed by: Solar eclipse of June 8, 1937

=== Tritos ===
- Preceded by: Lunar eclipse of July 4, 1917
- Followed by: Lunar eclipse of May 3, 1939

=== Lunar Saros 129 ===
- Preceded by: Lunar eclipse of May 24, 1910
- Followed by: Lunar eclipse of June 14, 1946

=== Inex ===
- Preceded by: Lunar eclipse of June 23, 1899
- Followed by: Lunar eclipse of May 13, 1957

=== Triad ===
- Preceded by: Lunar eclipse of August 2, 1841
- Followed by: Lunar eclipse of April 4, 2015

=== Lunar eclipses of 1926–1929 ===
This eclipse is a member of a semester series. An eclipse in a semester series of lunar eclipses repeats approximately every 177 days and 4 hours (a semester) at alternating nodes of the Moon's orbit.

The penumbral lunar eclipses on January 28, 1926 and July 25, 1926 occur in the previous lunar year eclipse set.

Lunar eclipse series sets from 1926 to 1929
Descending node				Ascending node			
Saros	Date Viewing	Type Chart	Gamma	Saros	Date Viewing	Type Chart	Gamma
109	1926 Jun 25	Penumbral	1.1814	114	1926 Dec 19	Penumbral	−1.0101
119	1927 Jun 15	Total	0.4543	124	1927 Dec 08	Total	−0.2796
129	1928 Jun 03	Total	−0.3175	134	1928 Nov 27	Total	0.3952
139	1929 May 23	Penumbral	−1.0650	144	1929 Nov 17	Penumbral	1.0947

=== Saros 129 ===
This eclipse is a part of Saros series 129, repeating every 18 years, 11 days, and containing 71 events. The series started with a penumbral lunar eclipse on June 10, 1351. It contains partial eclipses from September 26, 1531 through May 11, 1892; total eclipses from May 24, 1910 through September 8, 2090; and a second set of partial eclipses from September 20, 2108 through April 26, 2469. The series ends at member 71 as a penumbral eclipse on July 24, 2613.

The longest duration of totality was produced by member 37 at 106 minutes, 24 seconds on July 16, 2000. All eclipses in this series occur at the Moon’s descending node of orbit.

Greatest	First			
The greatest eclipse of the series occurred on 2000 Jul 16, lasting 106 minutes, 24 seconds.	Penumbral	Partial	Total	Central
The greatest eclipse of the series occurred on 2000 Jul 16, lasting 106 minutes, 24 seconds.	1351 Jun 10	1531 Sep 26	1910 May 24	1946 Jun 14
The greatest eclipse of the series occurred on 2000 Jul 16, lasting 106 minutes, 24 seconds.	Last			
The greatest eclipse of the series occurred on 2000 Jul 16, lasting 106 minutes, 24 seconds.	Central	Total	Partial	Penumbral
The greatest eclipse of the series occurred on 2000 Jul 16, lasting 106 minutes, 24 seconds.	2036 Aug 07	2090 Sep 08	2469 Apr 26	2613 Jul 24

Eclipses are tabulated in three columns; every third eclipse in the same column is one exeligmos apart, so they all cast shadows over approximately the same parts of the Earth.

Series members 26–48 occur between 1801 and 2200:
26	27	28
1802 Mar 19	1820 Mar 29	1838 Apr 10
29	30	31
1856 Apr 20	1874 May 01	1892 May 11
32	33	34
1910 May 24	1928 Jun 03	1946 Jun 14
35	36	37
1964 Jun 25	1982 Jul 06	2000 Jul 16
38	39	40
2018 Jul 27	2036 Aug 07	2054 Aug 18
41	42	43
2072 Aug 28	2090 Sep 08	2108 Sep 20
44	45	46
2126 Oct 01	2144 Oct 11	2162 Oct 23
47	48	
2180 Nov 02	2198 Nov 13	

=== Tritos series ===
This eclipse is a part of a tritos cycle, repeating at alternating nodes every 135 synodic months (≈ 3986.63 days, or 11 years minus 1 month). Their appearance and longitude are irregular due to a lack of synchronization with the anomalistic month (period of perigee), but groupings of 3 tritos cycles (≈ 33 years minus 3 months) come close (≈ 434.044 anomalistic months), so eclipses are similar in these groupings.

Series members between 1801 and 2200
1808 May 10 (Saros 118)	1819 Apr 10 (Saros 119)	1830 Mar 09 (Saros 120)	1841 Feb 06 (Saros 121)	1852 Jan 07 (Saros 122)
1862 Dec 06 (Saros 123)	1873 Nov 04 (Saros 124)	1884 Oct 04 (Saros 125)	1895 Sep 04 (Saros 126)	1906 Aug 04 (Saros 127)
1917 Jul 04 (Saros 128)	1928 Jun 03 (Saros 129)	1939 May 03 (Saros 130)	1950 Apr 02 (Saros 131)	1961 Mar 02 (Saros 132)
1972 Jan 30 (Saros 133)	1982 Dec 30 (Saros 134)	1993 Nov 29 (Saros 135)	2004 Oct 28 (Saros 136)	2015 Sep 28 (Saros 137)
2026 Aug 28 (Saros 138)	2037 Jul 27 (Saros 139)	2048 Jun 26 (Saros 140)	2059 May 27 (Saros 141)	2070 Apr 25 (Saros 142)
2081 Mar 25 (Saros 143)	2092 Feb 23 (Saros 144)	2103 Jan 23 (Saros 145)	2113 Dec 22 (Saros 146)	2124 Nov 21 (Saros 147)
2135 Oct 22 (Saros 148)	2146 Sep 20 (Saros 149)	2157 Aug 20 (Saros 150)	2168 Jul 20 (Saros 151)	2179 Jun 19 (Saros 152)
2190 May 19 (Saros 153)

=== Inex series ===
This eclipse is a part of the long period inex cycle, repeating at alternating nodes, every 358 synodic months (≈ 10,571.95 days, or 29 years minus 20 days). Their appearance and longitude are irregular due to a lack of synchronization with the anomalistic month (period of perigee). However, groupings of 3 inex cycles (≈ 87 years minus 2 months) comes close (≈ 1,151.02 anomalistic months), so eclipses are similar in these groupings.

Series members between 1801 and 2200
1812 Aug 22 (Saros 125)	1841 Aug 02 (Saros 126)	1870 Jul 12 (Saros 127)
1899 Jun 23 (Saros 128)	1928 Jun 03 (Saros 129)	1957 May 13 (Saros 130)
1986 Apr 24 (Saros 131)	2015 Apr 04 (Saros 132)	2044 Mar 13 (Saros 133)
2073 Feb 22 (Saros 134)	2102 Feb 03 (Saros 135)	2131 Jan 13 (Saros 136)
2159 Dec 24 (Saros 137)	2188 Dec 04 (Saros 138)	

=== Half-Saros cycle ===
A lunar eclipse will be preceded and followed by solar eclipses by 9 years and 5.5 days (a half saros). This lunar eclipse is related to two total solar eclipses of Solar Saros 136.

May 29, 1919	June 8, 1937

== See also ==
- List of lunar eclipses
- List of 20th-century lunar eclipses
