= September 2090 lunar eclipse =

Astronomical event

- Total eclipse
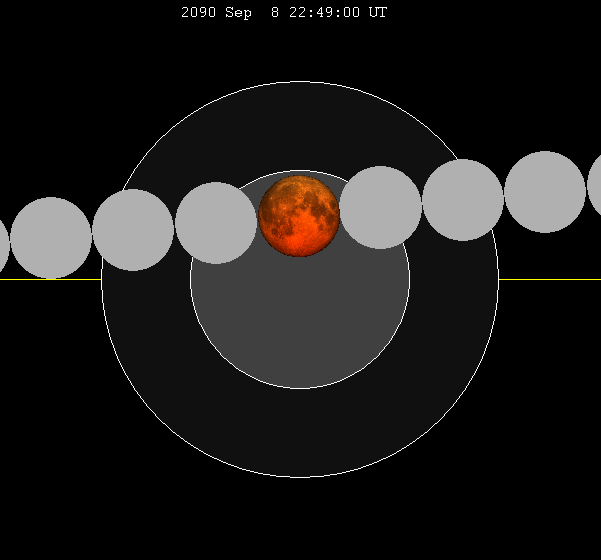
- The Moon's hourly motion shown right to left
- Date: September 8, 2090
- Gamma: 0.4257
- Magnitude: 1.0387
- Saros cycle: 129 (42 of 71)
- Totality: 31 minutes, 51 seconds
- Partiality: 213 minutes, 5 seconds
- Penumbral: 361 minutes, 59 seconds
Contacts (UTC)
- P1: 19:48:30
- U1: 21:02:56
- U2: 22:33:33
- Greatest: 22:49:29
- U3: 23:05:24
- U4: 0:36:01
- P4: 1:50:29

A total lunar eclipse will occur at the Moon’s descending node of orbit on Friday, September 8, 2090, with an umbral magnitude of 1.0387. A lunar eclipse occurs when the Moon moves into the Earth's shadow, causing the Moon to be darkened. A total lunar eclipse occurs when the Moon's near side entirely passes into the Earth's umbral shadow. Unlike a solar eclipse, which can only be viewed from a relatively small area of the world, a lunar eclipse may be viewed from anywhere on the night side of Earth. A total lunar eclipse can last up to nearly two hours, while a total solar eclipse lasts only a few minutes at any given place, because the Moon's shadow is smaller. Occurring only about 12 hours before apogee (on September 9, 2090, at 11:00 UTC), the Moon's apparent diameter will be smaller.

This lunar eclipse will be the second of a tetrad, with four total lunar eclipses in series, the others being on March 15, 2090; March 5, 2091; and August 29, 2091.

This will the final total lunar eclipse of Lunar Saros 129.

== Visibility ==
The eclipse will be completely visible over Africa, Europe, and the Middle East, seen rising over North and South America and setting over central, south Asia, and east Asia and Australia.

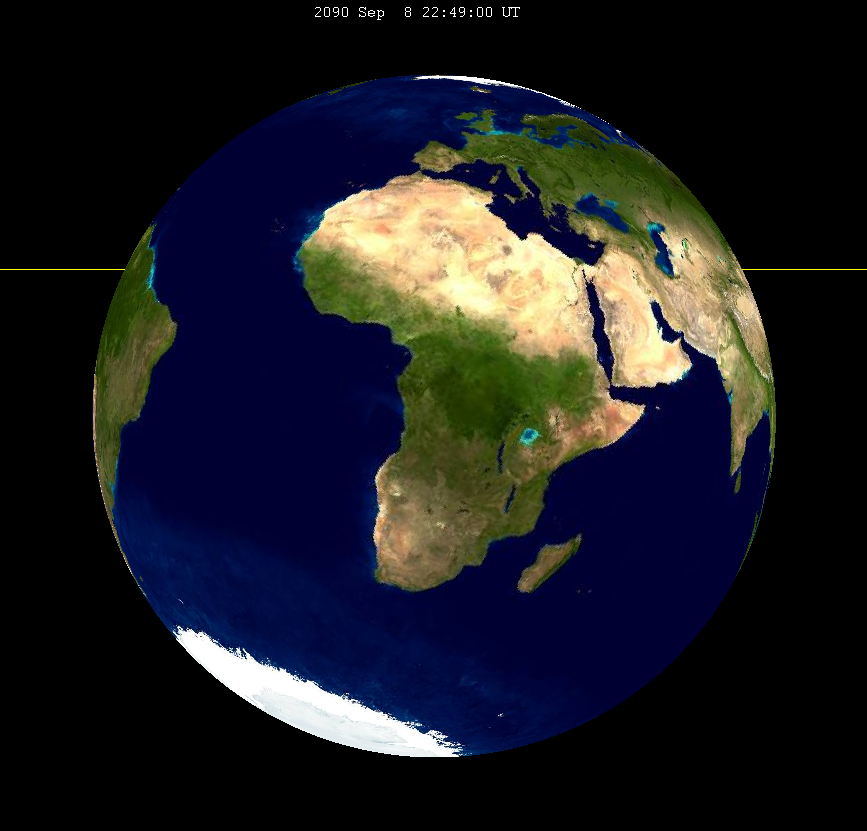
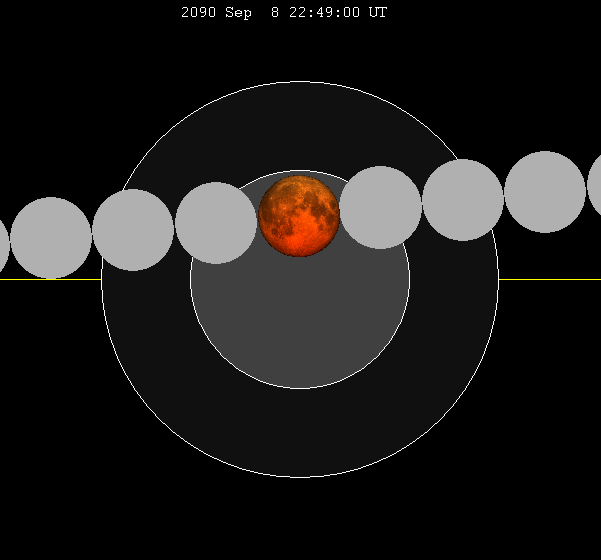

== Eclipse details ==
Shown below is a table displaying details about this particular solar eclipse. It describes various parameters pertaining to this eclipse.

September 8, 2090 Lunar Eclipse Parameters
Parameter	Value
Penumbral Magnitude	2.11781
Umbral Magnitude	1.03874
Gamma	0.42572
Sun Right Ascension	11h11m25.3s
Sun Declination	+05°12'29.2"
Sun Semi-Diameter	15'52.5"
Sun Equatorial Horizontal Parallax	08.7"
Moon Right Ascension	23h10m58.1s
Moon Declination	-04°50'31.3"
Moon Semi-Diameter	14'42.7"
Moon Equatorial Horizontal Parallax	0°53'59.5"
ΔT	117.7 s

== Eclipse season ==
This eclipse is part of an eclipse season, a period, roughly every six months, when eclipses occur. Only two (or occasionally three) eclipse seasons occur each year, and each season lasts about 35 days and repeats just short of six months (173 days) later; thus two full eclipse seasons always occur each year. Either two or three eclipses happen each eclipse season. In the sequence below, each eclipse is separated by a fortnight.

Eclipse season of September 2090
September 8 Descending node (full moon)	September 23 Ascending node (new moon)
Total lunar eclipse Lunar Saros 129	Total solar eclipse Solar Saros 155

== Related eclipses ==
=== Eclipses in 2090 ===
- A total lunar eclipse on March 15.
- A partial solar eclipse on March 31.
- A total lunar eclipse on September 8.
- A total solar eclipse on September 23.

=== Metonic ===
- Preceded by: Lunar eclipse of November 20, 2086
- Followed by: Lunar eclipse of June 28, 2094

=== Tzolkinex ===
- Preceded by: Lunar eclipse of July 28–29, 2083
- Followed by: Lunar eclipse of October 20–21, 2097

=== Half-Saros ===
- Preceded by: Solar eclipse of September 3, 2081
- Followed by: Solar eclipse of September 14, 2099

=== Tritos ===
- Preceded by: Lunar eclipse of October 10, 2079
- Followed by: Lunar eclipse of August 9, 2101

=== Lunar Saros 129 ===
- Preceded by: Lunar eclipse of August 28, 2072
- Followed by: Lunar eclipse of September 20, 2108

=== Inex ===
- Preceded by: Lunar eclipse of September 29, 2061
- Followed by: Lunar eclipse of August 20, 2119

=== Triad ===
- Preceded by: Lunar eclipse of November 9, 2003
- Followed by: Lunar eclipse of July 11, 2177

=== Lunar eclipses of 2089–2092 ===
This eclipse is a member of a semester series. An eclipse in a semester series of lunar eclipses repeats approximately every 177 days and 4 hours (a semester) at alternating nodes of the Moon's orbit.

The penumbral lunar eclipse on July 19, 2092 occurs in the next lunar year eclipse set.

Lunar eclipse series sets from 2089 to 2092
Ascending node				Descending node			
Saros	Date Viewing	Type Chart	Gamma	Saros	Date Viewing	Type Chart	Gamma
114	2089 Mar 26	Penumbral	−1.1038	119	2089 Sep 19	Penumbral	1.1447
124	2090 Mar 15	Total	−0.3674	129	2090 Sep 08	Total	0.4257
134	2091 Mar 05	Total	0.3212	139	2091 Aug 28–29	Total	−0.3270
144	2092 Feb 23	Penumbral	1.0509	149	2092 Aug 17	Penumbral	−1.0568

=== Saros 129 ===
This eclipse is a part of Saros series 129, repeating every 18 years, 11 days, and containing 71 events. The series started with a penumbral lunar eclipse on June 10, 1351. It contains partial eclipses from September 26, 1531 through May 11, 1892; total eclipses from May 24, 1910 through September 8, 2090; and a second set of partial eclipses from September 20, 2108 through April 26, 2469. The series ends at member 71 as a penumbral eclipse on July 24, 2613.

The longest duration of totality was produced by member 37 at 106 minutes, 24 seconds on July 16, 2000. All eclipses in this series occur at the Moon’s descending node of orbit.

Greatest	First			
The greatest eclipse of the series occurred on 2000 Jul 16, lasting 106 minutes, 24 seconds.	Penumbral	Partial	Total	Central
The greatest eclipse of the series occurred on 2000 Jul 16, lasting 106 minutes, 24 seconds.	1351 Jun 10	1531 Sep 26	1910 May 24	1946 Jun 14
The greatest eclipse of the series occurred on 2000 Jul 16, lasting 106 minutes, 24 seconds.	Last			
The greatest eclipse of the series occurred on 2000 Jul 16, lasting 106 minutes, 24 seconds.	Central	Total	Partial	Penumbral
The greatest eclipse of the series occurred on 2000 Jul 16, lasting 106 minutes, 24 seconds.	2036 Aug 07	2090 Sep 08	2469 Apr 26	2613 Jul 24

Eclipses are tabulated in three columns; every third eclipse in the same column is one exeligmos apart, so they all cast shadows over approximately the same parts of the Earth.

Series members 26–48 occur between 1801 and 2200:
26	27	28
1802 Mar 19	1820 Mar 29	1838 Apr 10
29	30	31
1856 Apr 20	1874 May 01	1892 May 11
32	33	34
1910 May 24	1928 Jun 03	1946 Jun 14
35	36	37
1964 Jun 25	1982 Jul 06	2000 Jul 16
38	39	40
2018 Jul 27	2036 Aug 07	2054 Aug 18
41	42	43
2072 Aug 28	2090 Sep 08	2108 Sep 20
44	45	46
2126 Oct 01	2144 Oct 11	2162 Oct 23
47	48	
2180 Nov 02	2198 Nov 13	

=== Tritos series ===
This eclipse is a part of a tritos cycle, repeating at alternating nodes every 135 synodic months (≈ 3986.63 days, or 11 years minus 1 month). Their appearance and longitude are irregular due to a lack of synchronization with the anomalistic month (period of perigee), but groupings of 3 tritos cycles (≈ 33 years minus 3 months) come close (≈ 434.044 anomalistic months), so eclipses are similar in these groupings.

Series members between 1801 and 2200
1806 Nov 26 (Saros 103)		1828 Sep 23 (Saros 105)	1839 Aug 24 (Saros 106)	1850 Jul 24 (Saros 107)
1861 Jun 22 (Saros 108)	1872 May 22 (Saros 109)	1883 Apr 22 (Saros 110)	1894 Mar 21 (Saros 111)	1905 Feb 19 (Saros 112)
1916 Jan 20 (Saros 113)	1926 Dec 19 (Saros 114)	1937 Nov 18 (Saros 115)	1948 Oct 18 (Saros 116)	1959 Sep 17 (Saros 117)
1970 Aug 17 (Saros 118)	1981 Jul 17 (Saros 119)	1992 Jun 15 (Saros 120)	2003 May 16 (Saros 121)	2014 Apr 15 (Saros 122)
2025 Mar 14 (Saros 123)	2036 Feb 11 (Saros 124)	2047 Jan 12 (Saros 125)	2057 Dec 11 (Saros 126)	2068 Nov 09 (Saros 127)
2079 Oct 10 (Saros 128)	2090 Sep 08 (Saros 129)	2101 Aug 09 (Saros 130)	2112 Jul 09 (Saros 131)	2123 Jun 09 (Saros 132)
2134 May 08 (Saros 133)	2145 Apr 07 (Saros 134)	2156 Mar 07 (Saros 135)	2167 Feb 04 (Saros 136)	2178 Jan 04 (Saros 137)
2188 Dec 04 (Saros 138)	2199 Nov 02 (Saros 139)			

=== Inex series ===
This eclipse is a part of the long period inex cycle, repeating at alternating nodes, every 358 synodic months (≈ 10,571.95 days, or 29 years minus 20 days). Their appearance and longitude are irregular due to a lack of synchronization with the anomalistic month (period of perigee). However, groupings of 3 inex cycles (≈ 87 years minus 2 months) comes close (≈ 1,151.02 anomalistic months), so eclipses are similar in these groupings.

Series members between 1801 and 2200
1801 Mar 30 (Saros 119)	1830 Mar 09 (Saros 120)	1859 Feb 17 (Saros 121)
1888 Jan 28 (Saros 122)	1917 Jan 08 (Saros 123)	1945 Dec 19 (Saros 124)
1974 Nov 29 (Saros 125)	2003 Nov 09 (Saros 126)	2032 Oct 18 (Saros 127)
2061 Sep 29 (Saros 128)	2090 Sep 08 (Saros 129)	2119 Aug 20 (Saros 130)
2148 Jul 31 (Saros 131)	2177 Jul 11 (Saros 132)	

=== Half-Saros cycle ===
A lunar eclipse will be preceded and followed by solar eclipses by 9 years and 5.5 days (a half saros). This lunar eclipse is related to two total solar eclipses of Solar Saros 136.

September 3, 2081	September 14, 2099

== See also ==
- List of lunar eclipses and List of 21st-century lunar eclipses
