= August 2054 lunar eclipse =

Astronomical event

- Total eclipse
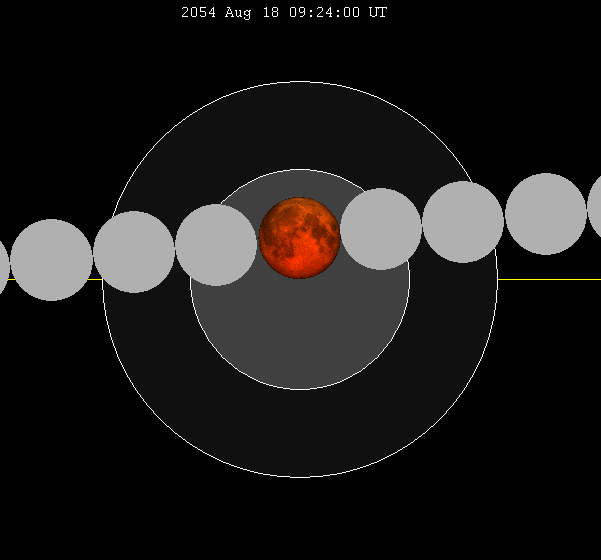
- The Moon's hourly motion shown right to left
- Date: August 18, 2054
- Gamma: 0.2806
- Magnitude: 1.3074
- Saros cycle: 129 (40 of 71)
- Totality: 82 minutes, 57 seconds
- Partiality: 226 minutes, 32 seconds
- Penumbral: 369 minutes, 27 seconds
Contacts (UTC)
- P1: 6:20:05
- U1: 7:31:32
- U2: 8:43:19
- Greatest: 9:24:48
- U3: 10:06:16
- U4: 11:18:04
- P4: 12:29:32

A total lunar eclipse will occur at the Moon’s descending node of orbit on Tuesday, August 18, 2054, with an umbral magnitude of 1.3074. A lunar eclipse occurs when the Moon moves into the Earth's shadow, causing the Moon to be darkened. A total lunar eclipse occurs when the Moon's near side entirely passes into the Earth's umbral shadow. Unlike a solar eclipse, which can only be viewed from a relatively small area of the world, a lunar eclipse may be viewed from anywhere on the night side of Earth. A total lunar eclipse can last up to nearly two hours, while a total solar eclipse lasts only a few minutes at any given place, because the Moon's shadow is smaller. Occurring only about 2 hours after apogee (on August 18, 2054, at 6:20 UTC), the Moon's apparent diameter will be smaller.

This lunar eclipse will be the second of an almost tetrad, with the others being on February 22, 2054 (total); February 11, 2055 (total); and August 7, 2055 (partial).

== Visibility ==
The eclipse will be completely visible over western North America and the central and eastern Pacific Ocean, seen rising over east Asia and Australia and setting over eastern North America and South America.

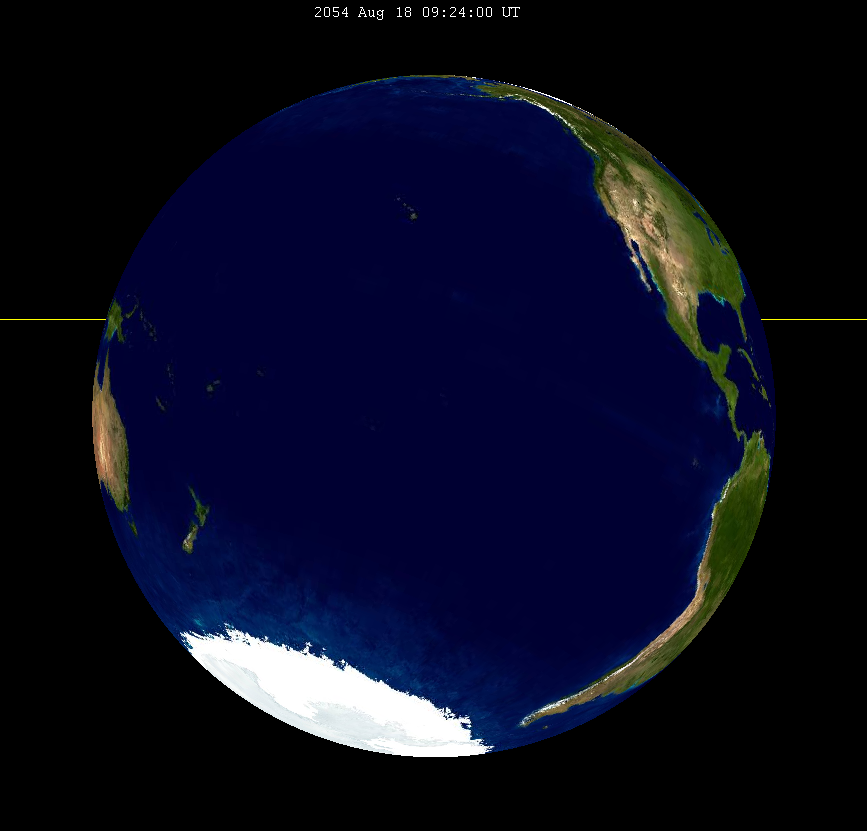
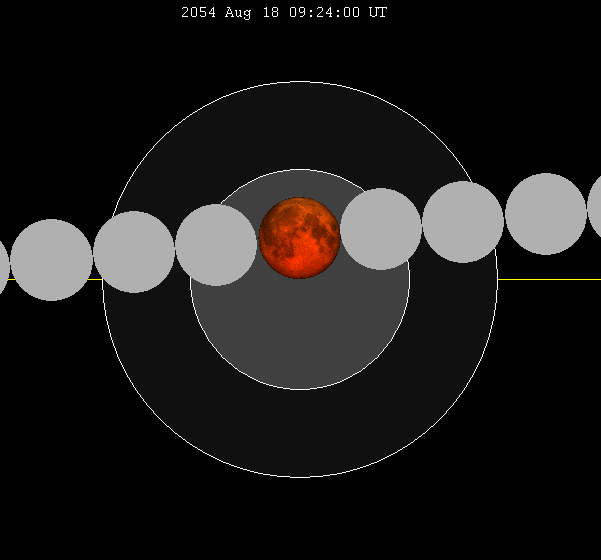

== Eclipse details ==
Shown below is a table displaying details about this particular solar eclipse. It describes various parameters pertaining to this eclipse.

August 18, 2054 Lunar Eclipse Parameters
Parameter	Value
Penumbral Magnitude	2.38166
Umbral Magnitude	1.30735
Gamma	0.28065
Sun Right Ascension	09h51m47.0s
Sun Declination	+12°57'08.8"
Sun Semi-Diameter	15'48.0"
Sun Equatorial Horizontal Parallax	08.7"
Moon Right Ascension	21h51m32.0s
Moon Declination	-12°42'26.7"
Moon Semi-Diameter	14'42.4"
Moon Equatorial Horizontal Parallax	0°53'58.4"
ΔT	88.1 s

== Eclipse season ==
This eclipse is part of an eclipse season, a period, roughly every six months, when eclipses occur. Only two (or occasionally three) eclipse seasons occur each year, and each season lasts about 35 days and repeats just short of six months (173 days) later; thus two full eclipse seasons always occur each year. Either two or three eclipses happen each eclipse season. In the sequence below, each eclipse is separated by a fortnight. The first and last eclipse in this sequence is separated by one synodic month.

Eclipse season of August–September 2054
August 3 Ascending node (new moon)	August 18 Descending node (full moon)	September 2 Ascending node (new moon)
Partial solar eclipse Solar Saros 117	Total lunar eclipse Lunar Saros 129	Partial solar eclipse Solar Saros 155

== Related eclipses ==
=== Eclipses in 2054 ===
- A total lunar eclipse on February 22.
- A partial solar eclipse on March 9.
- A partial solar eclipse on August 3.
- A total lunar eclipse on August 18.
- A partial solar eclipse on September 2.

=== Metonic ===
- Preceded by: Lunar eclipse of October 30, 2050
- Followed by: Lunar eclipse of June 6, 2058

=== Tzolkinex ===
- Preceded by: Lunar eclipse of July 7, 2047
- Followed by: Lunar eclipse of September 29, 2061

=== Half-Saros ===
- Preceded by: Solar eclipse of August 12, 2045
- Followed by: Solar eclipse of August 24, 2063

=== Tritos ===
- Preceded by: Lunar eclipse of September 19, 2043
- Followed by: Lunar eclipse of July 17, 2065

=== Lunar Saros 129 ===
- Preceded by: Lunar eclipse of August 7, 2036
- Followed by: Lunar eclipse of August 28, 2072

=== Inex ===
- Preceded by: Lunar eclipse of September 7, 2025
- Followed by: Lunar eclipse of July 29, 2083

=== Triad ===
- Preceded by: Lunar eclipse of October 18, 1967
- Followed by: Lunar eclipse of June 19, 2141

=== Lunar eclipses of 2053–2056 ===
This eclipse is a member of a semester series. An eclipse in a semester series of lunar eclipses repeats approximately every 177 days and 4 hours (a semester) at alternating nodes of the Moon's orbit.

The penumbral lunar eclipses on June 27, 2056 and December 22, 2056 occur in the next lunar year eclipse set.

Lunar eclipse series sets from 2053 to 2056
Ascending node				Descending node			
Saros	Date Viewing	Type Chart	Gamma	Saros	Date Viewing	Type Chart	Gamma
114	2053 Mar 04	Penumbral	−1.0530	119	2053 Aug 29	Penumbral	1.0165
124	2054 Feb 22	Total	−0.3242	129	2054 Aug 18	Total	0.2806
134	2055 Feb 11	Total	0.3526	139	2055 Aug 07	Partial	−0.4769
144	2056 Feb 01	Penumbral	1.0682	149	2056 Jul 26	Partial	−1.2048

=== Saros 129 ===
This eclipse is a part of Saros series 129, repeating every 18 years, 11 days, and containing 71 events. The series started with a penumbral lunar eclipse on June 10, 1351. It contains partial eclipses from September 26, 1531 through May 11, 1892; total eclipses from May 24, 1910 through September 8, 2090; and a second set of partial eclipses from September 20, 2108 through April 26, 2469. The series ends at member 71 as a penumbral eclipse on July 24, 2613.

The longest duration of totality was produced by member 37 at 106 minutes, 24 seconds on July 16, 2000. All eclipses in this series occur at the Moon’s descending node of orbit.

Greatest	First			
The greatest eclipse of the series occurred on 2000 Jul 16, lasting 106 minutes, 24 seconds.	Penumbral	Partial	Total	Central
The greatest eclipse of the series occurred on 2000 Jul 16, lasting 106 minutes, 24 seconds.	1351 Jun 10	1531 Sep 26	1910 May 24	1946 Jun 14
The greatest eclipse of the series occurred on 2000 Jul 16, lasting 106 minutes, 24 seconds.	Last			
The greatest eclipse of the series occurred on 2000 Jul 16, lasting 106 minutes, 24 seconds.	Central	Total	Partial	Penumbral
The greatest eclipse of the series occurred on 2000 Jul 16, lasting 106 minutes, 24 seconds.	2036 Aug 07	2090 Sep 08	2469 Apr 26	2613 Jul 24

Eclipses are tabulated in three columns; every third eclipse in the same column is one exeligmos apart, so they all cast shadows over approximately the same parts of the Earth.

Series members 26–48 occur between 1801 and 2200:
26	27	28
1802 Mar 19	1820 Mar 29	1838 Apr 10
29	30	31
1856 Apr 20	1874 May 01	1892 May 11
32	33	34
1910 May 24	1928 Jun 03	1946 Jun 14
35	36	37
1964 Jun 25	1982 Jul 06	2000 Jul 16
38	39	40
2018 Jul 27	2036 Aug 07	2054 Aug 18
41	42	43
2072 Aug 28	2090 Sep 08	2108 Sep 20
44	45	46
2126 Oct 01	2144 Oct 11	2162 Oct 23
47	48	
2180 Nov 02	2198 Nov 13	

=== Tritos series ===
This eclipse is a part of a tritos cycle, repeating at alternating nodes every 135 synodic months (≈ 3986.63 days, or 11 years minus 1 month). Their appearance and longitude are irregular due to a lack of synchronization with the anomalistic month (period of perigee), but groupings of 3 tritos cycles (≈ 33 years minus 3 months) come close (≈ 434.044 anomalistic months), so eclipses are similar in these groupings.

Series members between 1801 and 2200
1803 Aug 03 (Saros 106)	1814 Jul 02 (Saros 107)	1825 Jun 01 (Saros 108)	1836 May 01 (Saros 109)	1847 Mar 31 (Saros 110)
1858 Feb 27 (Saros 111)	1869 Jan 28 (Saros 112)	1879 Dec 28 (Saros 113)	1890 Nov 26 (Saros 114)	1901 Oct 27 (Saros 115)
1912 Sep 26 (Saros 116)	1923 Aug 26 (Saros 117)	1934 Jul 26 (Saros 118)	1945 Jun 25 (Saros 119)	1956 May 24 (Saros 120)
1967 Apr 24 (Saros 121)	1978 Mar 24 (Saros 122)	1989 Feb 20 (Saros 123)	2000 Jan 21 (Saros 124)	2010 Dec 21 (Saros 125)
2021 Nov 19 (Saros 126)	2032 Oct 18 (Saros 127)	2043 Sep 19 (Saros 128)	2054 Aug 18 (Saros 129)	2065 Jul 17 (Saros 130)
2076 Jun 17 (Saros 131)	2087 May 17 (Saros 132)	2098 Apr 15 (Saros 133)	2109 Mar 17 (Saros 134)	2120 Feb 14 (Saros 135)
2131 Jan 13 (Saros 136)	2141 Dec 13 (Saros 137)	2152 Nov 12 (Saros 138)	2163 Oct 12 (Saros 139)	2174 Sep 11 (Saros 140)
2185 Aug 11 (Saros 141)	2196 Jul 10 (Saros 142)			

=== Inex series ===
This eclipse is a part of the long period inex cycle, repeating at alternating nodes, every 358 synodic months (≈ 10,571.95 days, or 29 years minus 20 days). Their appearance and longitude are irregular due to a lack of synchronization with the anomalistic month (period of perigee). However, groupings of 3 inex cycles (≈ 87 years minus 2 months) comes close (≈ 1,151.02 anomalistic months), so eclipses are similar in these groupings.

Series members between 1801 and 2200
1823 Jan 26 (Saros 121)	1852 Jan 07 (Saros 122)	1880 Dec 16 (Saros 123)
1909 Nov 27 (Saros 124)	1938 Nov 07 (Saros 125)	1967 Oct 18 (Saros 126)
1996 Sep 27 (Saros 127)	2025 Sep 07 (Saros 128)	2054 Aug 18 (Saros 129)
2083 Jul 29 (Saros 130)	2112 Jul 09 (Saros 131)	2141 Jun 19 (Saros 132)
2170 May 30 (Saros 133)	2199 May 10 (Saros 134)	

=== Half-Saros cycle ===
A lunar eclipse will be preceded and followed by solar eclipses by 9 years and 5.5 days (a half saros). This lunar eclipse is related to two total solar eclipses of Solar Saros 136.

August 12, 2045	August 24, 2063

== See also ==
- List of lunar eclipses and List of 21st-century lunar eclipses
