= June 1964 lunar eclipse =

Total lunar eclipse June 25, 1964

- Total eclipse
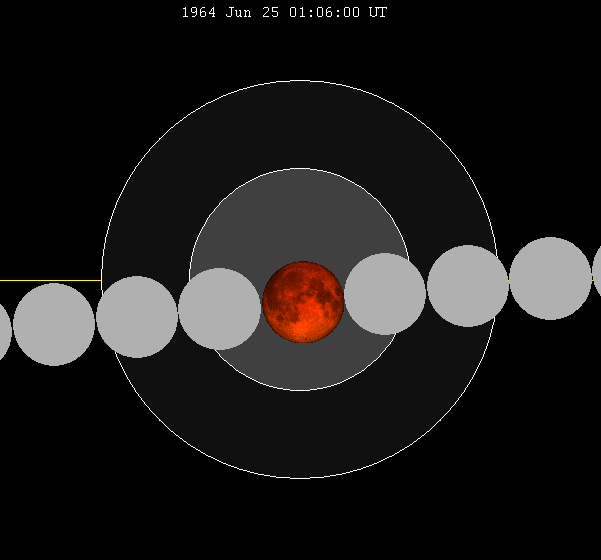
- The Moon's hourly motion shown right to left
- Date: June 25, 1964
- Gamma: −0.1461
- Magnitude: 1.5565
- Saros cycle: 129 (35 of 71)
- Totality: 100 minutes, 47 seconds
- Partiality: 233 minutes, 14 seconds
- Penumbral: 372 minutes, 5 seconds
Contacts (UTC)
- P1: 22:00:11
- U1: 23:09:37
- U2: 0:15:51
- Greatest: 1:06:14
- U3: 1:56:38
- U4: 3:02:52
- P4: 4:12:16

A total lunar eclipse occurred at the Moon’s descending node of orbit on Thursday, June 25, 1964, with an umbral magnitude of 1.5565. It was a central lunar eclipse, in which part of the Moon passed through the center of the Earth's shadow. A lunar eclipse occurs when the Moon moves into the Earth's shadow, causing the Moon to be darkened. A total lunar eclipse occurs when the Moon's near side entirely passes into the Earth's umbral shadow. Unlike a solar eclipse, which can only be viewed from a relatively small area of the world, a lunar eclipse may be viewed from anywhere on the night side of Earth. A total lunar eclipse can last up to nearly two hours, while a total solar eclipse lasts only a few minutes at any given place, because the Moon's shadow is smaller. Occurring about 1.5 days after apogee (on June 23, 1964, at 12:30 UTC), the Moon's apparent diameter was smaller.

== Visibility ==
The eclipse was completely visible over much of South America, western Europe, and west, central, and southern Africa, seen rising over much of North America and northwestern South America and setting over much of Europe, northeast Africa, the western half of Asia, and western Australia.

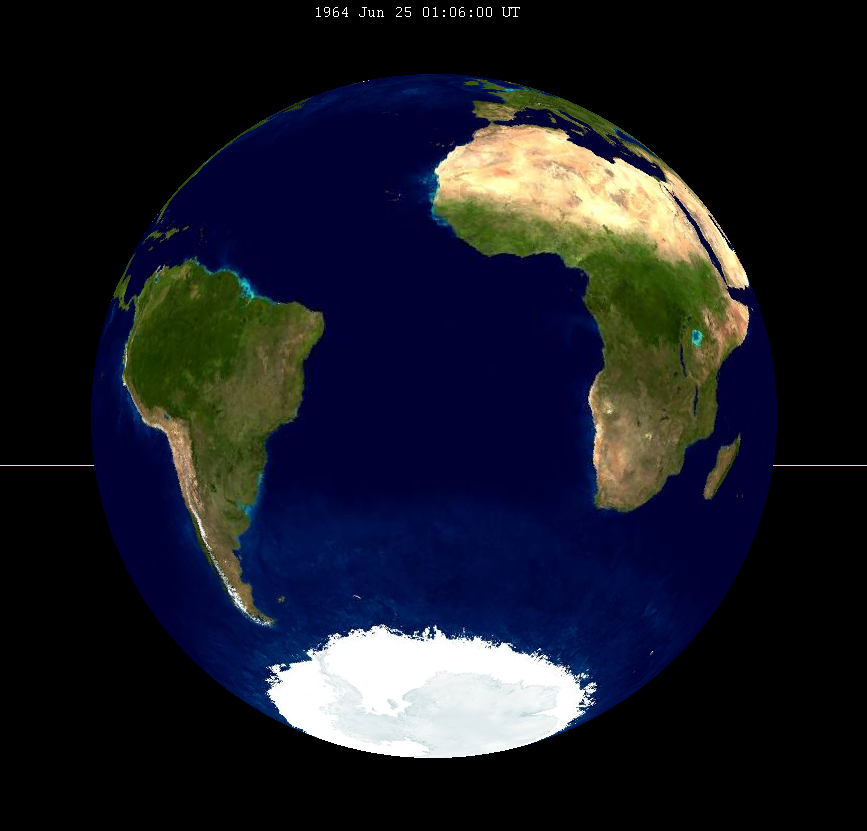
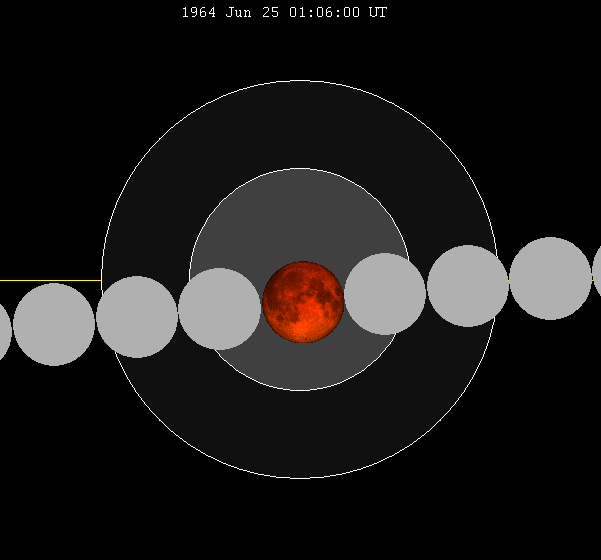

== Eclipse details ==
Shown below is a table displaying details about this particular solar eclipse. It describes various parameters pertaining to this eclipse.

June 25, 1964 Lunar Eclipse Parameters
| Parameter | Value |
|---|---|
| Penumbral Magnitude | 2.62384 |
| Umbral Magnitude | 1.55649 |
| Gamma | −0.14611 |
| Sun Right Ascension | 06h15m16.1s |
| Sun Declination | +23°23'50.0" |
| Sun Semi-Diameter | 15'44.1" |
| Sun Equatorial Horizontal Parallax | 08.7" |
| Moon Right Ascension | 18h15m13.5s |
| Moon Declination | -23°31'42.9" |
| Moon Semi-Diameter | 14'44.5" |
| Moon Equatorial Horizontal Parallax | 0°54'06.1" |
| ΔT | 35.4 s |

== Eclipse season ==
This eclipse is part of an eclipse season, a period, roughly every six months, when eclipses occur. Only two (or occasionally three) eclipse seasons occur each year, and each season lasts about 35 days and repeats just short of six months (173 days) later; thus two full eclipse seasons always occur each year. Either two or three eclipses happen each eclipse season. In the sequence below, each eclipse is separated by a fortnight. The first and last eclipse in this sequence is separated by one synodic month.

Eclipse season of June–July 1964
| June 10 Ascending node (new moon) | June 25 Descending node (full moon) | July 9 Ascending node (new moon) |
|---|---|---|
| Partial solar eclipse Solar Saros 117 | Total lunar eclipse Lunar Saros 129 | Partial solar eclipse Solar Saros 155 |

== Related eclipses ==
=== Eclipses in 1964 ===
- A partial solar eclipse on January 14.
- A partial solar eclipse on June 10.
- A total lunar eclipse on June 25.
- A partial solar eclipse on July 9.
- A partial solar eclipse on December 4.
- A total lunar eclipse on December 19.

=== Metonic ===
- Preceded by: Lunar eclipse of September 5, 1960
- Followed by: Lunar eclipse of April 13, 1968

=== Tzolkinex ===
- Preceded by: Lunar eclipse of May 13, 1957
- Followed by: Lunar eclipse of August 6, 1971

=== Half-Saros ===
- Preceded by: Solar eclipse of June 20, 1955
- Followed by: Solar eclipse of June 30, 1973

=== Tritos ===
- Preceded by: Lunar eclipse of July 26, 1953
- Followed by: Lunar eclipse of May 25, 1975

=== Lunar Saros 129 ===
- Preceded by: Lunar eclipse of June 14, 1946
- Followed by: Lunar eclipse of July 6, 1982

=== Inex ===
- Preceded by: Lunar eclipse of July 16, 1935
- Followed by: Lunar eclipse of June 4, 1993

=== Triad ===
- Preceded by: Lunar eclipse of August 23, 1877
- Followed by: Lunar eclipse of April 26, 2051

=== Lunar eclipses of 1962–1965 ===
This eclipse is a member of a semester series. An eclipse in a semester series of lunar eclipses repeats approximately every 177 days and 4 hours (a semester) at alternating nodes of the Moon's orbit.

The penumbral lunar eclipses on February 19, 1962 and August 15, 1962 occur in the previous lunar year eclipse set.

Lunar eclipse series sets from 1962 to 1965
| Descending node | | | | Ascending node | | | |
| Saros | Date Viewing | Type Chart | Gamma | Saros | Date Viewing | Type Chart | Gamma |
| 109 | 1962 Jul 17 | Penumbral | 1.3371 | 114 | 1963 Jan 09 | Penumbral | −1.0128 |
| 119 | 1963 Jul 06 | Partial | 0.6197 | 124 | 1963 Dec 30 | Total | −0.2889 |
| 129 | 1964 Jun 25 | Total | −0.1461 | 134 | 1964 Dec 19 | Total | 0.3801 |
| 139 | 1965 Jun 14 | Partial | −0.9006 | 144 | 1965 Dec 08 | Penumbral | 1.0775 |

=== Saros 129 ===
This eclipse is a part of Saros series 129, repeating every 18 years, 11 days, and containing 71 events. The series started with a penumbral lunar eclipse on June 10, 1351. It contains partial eclipses from September 26, 1531 through May 11, 1892; total eclipses from May 24, 1910 through September 8, 2090; and a second set of partial eclipses from September 20, 2108 through April 26, 2469. The series ends at member 71 as a penumbral eclipse on July 24, 2613.

The longest duration of totality was produced by member 37 at 106 minutes, 24 seconds on July 16, 2000. All eclipses in this series occur at the Moon’s descending node of orbit.

| Greatest | First | | | |
|---|---|---|---|---|
| The greatest eclipse of the series occurred on 2000 Jul 16, lasting 106 minutes, 24 seconds. | Penumbral | Partial | Total | Central |
| The greatest eclipse of the series occurred on 2000 Jul 16, lasting 106 minutes, 24 seconds. | 1351 Jun 10 | 1531 Sep 26 | 1910 May 24 | 1946 Jun 14 |
| The greatest eclipse of the series occurred on 2000 Jul 16, lasting 106 minutes, 24 seconds. | Last | | | |
| The greatest eclipse of the series occurred on 2000 Jul 16, lasting 106 minutes, 24 seconds. | Central | Total | Partial | Penumbral |
| The greatest eclipse of the series occurred on 2000 Jul 16, lasting 106 minutes, 24 seconds. | 2036 Aug 07 | 2090 Sep 08 | 2469 Apr 26 | 2613 Jul 24 |

Eclipses are tabulated in three columns; every third eclipse in the same column is one exeligmos apart, so they all cast shadows over approximately the same parts of the Earth.

Series members 26–48 occur between 1801 and 2200:
| 26 | 27 | 28 |
|---|---|---|
| 1802 Mar 19 | 1820 Mar 29 | 1838 Apr 10 |
| 29 | 30 | 31 |
| 1856 Apr 20 | 1874 May 01 | 1892 May 11 |
| 32 | 33 | 34 |
| 1910 May 24 | 1928 Jun 03 | 1946 Jun 14 |
| 35 | 36 | 37 |
| 1964 Jun 25 | 1982 Jul 06 | 2000 Jul 16 |
| 38 | 39 | 40 |
| 2018 Jul 27 | 2036 Aug 07 | 2054 Aug 18 |
| 41 | 42 | 43 |
| 2072 Aug 28 | 2090 Sep 08 | 2108 Sep 20 |
| 44 | 45 | 46 |
| 2126 Oct 01 | 2144 Oct 11 | 2162 Oct 23 |
| 47 | 48 | |
| 2180 Nov 02 | 2198 Nov 13 | |

=== Tritos series ===
This eclipse is a part of a tritos cycle, repeating at alternating nodes every 135 synodic months (≈ 3986.63 days, or 11 years minus 1 month). Their appearance and longitude are irregular due to a lack of synchronization with the anomalistic month (period of perigee), but groupings of 3 tritos cycles (≈ 33 years minus 3 months) come close (≈ 434.044 anomalistic months), so eclipses are similar in these groupings.

Series members between 1801 and 2200
| 1811 Sep 02 (Saros 115) | 1822 Aug 03 (Saros 116) | 1833 Jul 02 (Saros 117) | 1844 May 31 (Saros 118) | 1855 May 02 (Saros 119) |
| 1866 Mar 31 (Saros 120) | 1877 Feb 27 (Saros 121) | 1888 Jan 28 (Saros 122) | 1898 Dec 27 (Saros 123) | 1909 Nov 27 (Saros 124) |
| 1920 Oct 27 (Saros 125) | 1931 Sep 26 (Saros 126) | 1942 Aug 26 (Saros 127) | 1953 Jul 26 (Saros 128) | 1964 Jun 25 (Saros 129) |
| 1975 May 25 (Saros 130) | 1986 Apr 24 (Saros 131) | 1997 Mar 24 (Saros 132) | 2008 Feb 21 (Saros 133) | 2019 Jan 21 (Saros 134) |
| 2029 Dec 20 (Saros 135) | 2040 Nov 18 (Saros 136) | 2051 Oct 19 (Saros 137) | 2062 Sep 18 (Saros 138) | 2073 Aug 17 (Saros 139) |
| 2084 Jul 17 (Saros 140) | 2095 Jun 17 (Saros 141) | 2106 May 17 (Saros 142) | 2117 Apr 16 (Saros 143) | 2128 Mar 16 (Saros 144) |
| 2139 Feb 13 (Saros 145) | 2150 Jan 13 (Saros 146) | 2160 Dec 13 (Saros 147) | 2171 Nov 12 (Saros 148) | 2182 Oct 11 (Saros 149) |
2193 Sep 11 (Saros 150)

=== Inex series ===
This eclipse is a part of the long period inex cycle, repeating at alternating nodes, every 358 synodic months (≈ 10,571.95 days, or 29 years minus 20 days). Their appearance and longitude are irregular due to a lack of synchronization with the anomalistic month (period of perigee). However, groupings of 3 inex cycles (≈ 87 years minus 2 months) comes close (≈ 1,151.02 anomalistic months), so eclipses are similar in these groupings.

Series members between 1801 and 2200
| 1819 Oct 03 (Saros 124) | 1848 Sep 13 (Saros 125) | 1877 Aug 23 (Saros 126) |
| 1906 Aug 04 (Saros 127) | 1935 Jul 16 (Saros 128) | 1964 Jun 25 (Saros 129) |
| 1993 Jun 04 (Saros 130) | 2022 May 16 (Saros 131) | 2051 Apr 26 (Saros 132) |
| 2080 Apr 04 (Saros 133) | 2109 Mar 17 (Saros 134) | 2138 Feb 24 (Saros 135) |
| 2167 Feb 04 (Saros 136) | 2196 Jan 15 (Saros 137) | |

=== Half-Saros cycle ===
A lunar eclipse will be preceded and followed by solar eclipses by 9 years and 5.5 days (a half saros). This lunar eclipse is related to two total solar eclipses of Solar Saros 136.

| June 20, 1955 | June 30, 1973 |

== See also ==
- List of lunar eclipses
- List of 20th-century lunar eclipses
