= August 2072 lunar eclipse =

Astronomical event

- Total eclipse
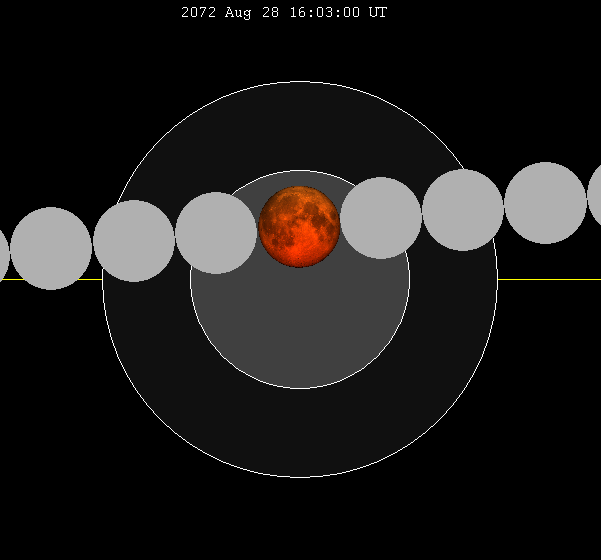
- The Moon's hourly motion shown right to left
- Date: August 28, 2072
- Gamma: 0.3563
- Magnitude: 1.1673
- Saros cycle: 129 (41 of 71)
- Totality: 64 minutes, 12 seconds
- Partiality: 220 minutes, 19 seconds
- Penumbral: 306 minutes, 0 seconds
Contacts (UTC)
- P1: 13:00:22
- U1: 14:13:12
- U2: 15:31:16
- Greatest: 16:03:22
- U3: 16:35:27
- U4: 17:53:31
- P4: 19:06:22

A total lunar eclipse will occur at the Moon’s descending node of orbit on Sunday, August 28, 2072, with an umbral magnitude of 1.1673. A lunar eclipse occurs when the Moon moves into the Earth's shadow, causing the Moon to be darkened. A total lunar eclipse occurs when the Moon's near side entirely passes into the Earth's umbral shadow. Unlike a solar eclipse, which can only be viewed from a relatively small area of the world, a lunar eclipse may be viewed from anywhere on the night side of Earth. A total lunar eclipse can last up to nearly two hours, while a total solar eclipse lasts only a few minutes at any given place, because the Moon's shadow is smaller. Occurring only about 4.5 hours before apogee (on August 28, 2072, at 20:40 UTC), the Moon's apparent diameter will be smaller.

This lunar eclipse will be the second of a tetrad, with four total lunar eclipses in series, the others being on March 4, 2072; February 22, 2073; and August 17, 2073.

== Visibility ==
The eclipse will be completely visible over southeast and east Asia, Australia, and Antarctica, seen rising over Africa, Europe, and west and central Asia and setting over the eastern Pacific Ocean and western North America.

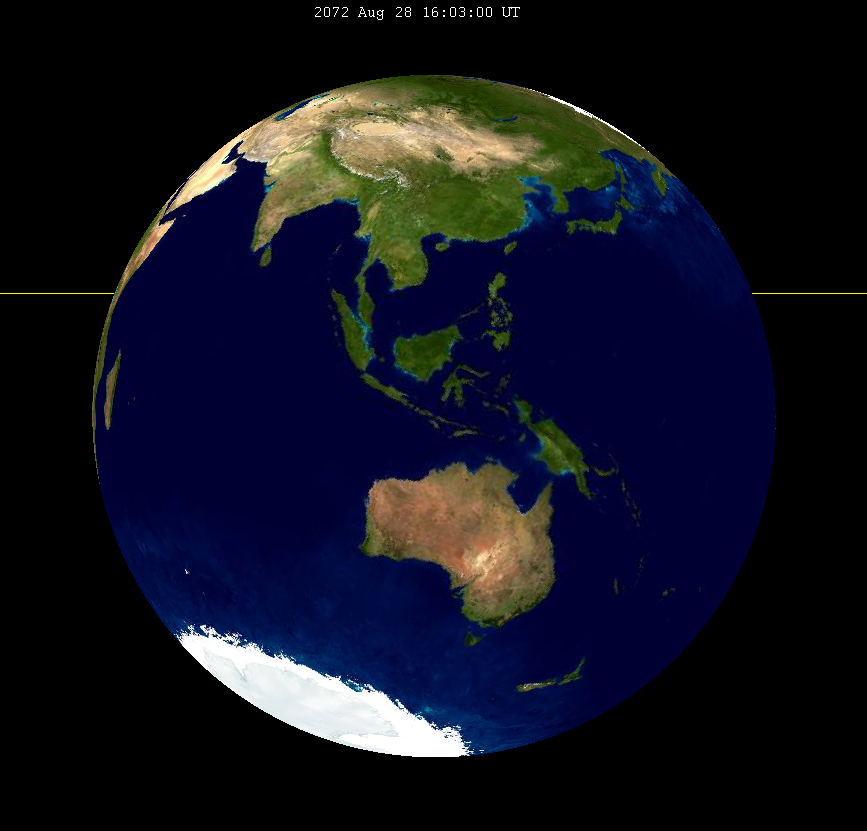
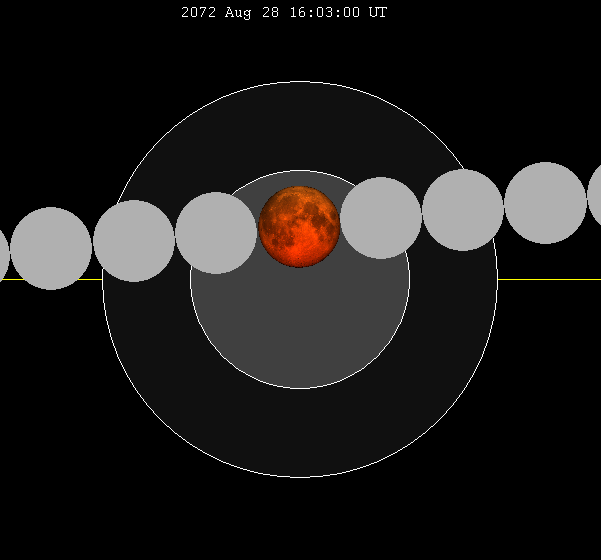

== Eclipse details ==
Shown below is a table displaying details about this particular lunar eclipse. It describes various parameters pertaining to this eclipse.

August 28, 2072 Lunar Eclipse Parameters
Parameter	Value
Penumbral Magnitude	2.24389
Umbral Magnitude	1.16727
Gamma	0.35634
Sun Right Ascension	10h31m55.6s
Sun Declination	+09°13'37.7"
Sun Semi-Diameter	15'50.1"
Sun Equatorial Horizontal Parallax	08.7"
Moon Right Ascension	22h31m34.3s
Moon Declination	-08°55'07.7"
Moon Semi-Diameter	14'42.5"
Moon Equatorial Horizontal Parallax	0°53'58.7"
ΔT	101.6 s

== Eclipse season ==
This eclipse is part of an eclipse season, a period, roughly every six months, when eclipses occur. Only two (or occasionally three) eclipse seasons occur each year, and each season lasts about 35 days and repeats just short of six months (173 days) later; thus two full eclipse seasons always occur each year. Either two or three eclipses happen each eclipse season. In the sequence below, each eclipse is separated by a fortnight.

Eclipse season of August–September 2072
August 28 Descending node (full moon)	September 12 Ascending node (new moon)
Total lunar eclipse Lunar Saros 129	Total solar eclipse Solar Saros 155

== Related eclipses ==
=== Eclipses in 2072 ===
- A total lunar eclipse on March 4.
- A partial solar eclipse on March 19.
- A total lunar eclipse on August 28.
- A total solar eclipse on September 12.

=== Metonic ===
- Preceded by: Lunar eclipse of November 9, 2068
- Followed by: Lunar eclipse of June 17, 2076

=== Tzolkinex ===
- Preceded by: Lunar eclipse of July 17, 2065
- Followed by: Lunar eclipse of October 10, 2079

=== Half-Saros ===
- Preceded by: Solar eclipse of August 24, 2063
- Followed by: Solar eclipse of September 3, 2081

=== Tritos ===
- Preceded by: Lunar eclipse of September 29, 2061
- Followed by: Lunar eclipse of July 29, 2083

=== Lunar Saros 129 ===
- Preceded by: Lunar eclipse of August 18, 2054
- Followed by: Lunar eclipse of September 8, 2090

=== Inex ===
- Preceded by: Lunar eclipse of September 19, 2043
- Followed by: Lunar eclipse of August 9, 2101

=== Triad ===
- Preceded by: Lunar eclipse of October 28, 1985
- Followed by: Lunar eclipse of June 30, 2159

=== Lunar eclipses of 2071–2074 ===
This eclipse is a member of a semester series. An eclipse in a semester series of lunar eclipses repeats approximately every 177 days and 4 hours (a semester) at alternating nodes of the Moon's orbit.

The penumbral lunar eclipse on July 8, 2074 occurs in the next lunar year eclipse set.

Lunar eclipse series sets from 2071 to 2074
Ascending node				Descending node			
Saros	Date Viewing	Type Chart	Gamma	Saros	Date Viewing	Type Chart	Gamma
114	2071 Mar 16	Penumbral	−1.0756	119	2071 Sep 09	Penumbral	1.0834
124	2072 Mar 04	Total	−0.3430	129	2072 Aug 28	Total	0.3563
134	2073 Feb 22	Total	0.3388	139	2073 Aug 17	Total	−0.3998
144	2074 Feb 11	Penumbral	1.0611	149	2074 Aug 07	Penumbral	−1.1291

=== Saros 129 ===
This eclipse is a part of Saros series 129, repeating every 18 years, 11 days, and containing 71 events. The series started with a penumbral lunar eclipse on June 10, 1351. It contains partial eclipses from September 26, 1531 through May 11, 1892; total eclipses from May 24, 1910 through September 8, 2090; and a second set of partial eclipses from September 20, 2108 through April 26, 2469. The series ends at member 71 as a penumbral eclipse on July 24, 2613.

The longest duration of totality was produced by member 37 at 106 minutes, 24 seconds on July 16, 2000. All eclipses in this series occur at the Moon’s descending node of orbit.

Greatest	First			
The greatest eclipse of the series occurred on 2000 Jul 16, lasting 106 minutes, 24 seconds.	Penumbral	Partial	Total	Central
The greatest eclipse of the series occurred on 2000 Jul 16, lasting 106 minutes, 24 seconds.	1351 Jun 10	1531 Sep 26	1910 May 24	1946 Jun 14
The greatest eclipse of the series occurred on 2000 Jul 16, lasting 106 minutes, 24 seconds.	Last			
The greatest eclipse of the series occurred on 2000 Jul 16, lasting 106 minutes, 24 seconds.	Central	Total	Partial	Penumbral
The greatest eclipse of the series occurred on 2000 Jul 16, lasting 106 minutes, 24 seconds.	2036 Aug 07	2090 Sep 08	2469 Apr 26	2613 Jul 24

Eclipses are tabulated in three columns; every third eclipse in the same column is one exeligmos apart, so they all cast shadows over approximately the same parts of the Earth.

Series members 26–48 occur between 1801 and 2200:
26	27	28
1802 Mar 19	1820 Mar 29	1838 Apr 10
29	30	31
1856 Apr 20	1874 May 01	1892 May 11
32	33	34
1910 May 24	1928 Jun 03	1946 Jun 14
35	36	37
1964 Jun 25	1982 Jul 06	2000 Jul 16
38	39	40
2018 Jul 27	2036 Aug 07	2054 Aug 18
41	42	43
2072 Aug 28	2090 Sep 08	2108 Sep 20
44	45	46
2126 Oct 01	2144 Oct 11	2162 Oct 23
47	48	
2180 Nov 02	2198 Nov 13	

=== Tritos series ===
This eclipse is a part of a tritos cycle, repeating at alternating nodes every 135 synodic months (≈ 3986.63 days, or 11 years minus 1 month). Their appearance and longitude are irregular due to a lack of synchronization with the anomalistic month (period of perigee), but groupings of 3 tritos cycles (≈ 33 years minus 3 months) come close (≈ 434.044 anomalistic months), so eclipses are similar in these groupings.

Series members between 1801 and 2200
1810 Sep 13 (Saros 105)	1821 Aug 13 (Saros 106)	1832 Jul 12 (Saros 107)	1843 Jun 12 (Saros 108)	1854 May 12 (Saros 109)
1865 Apr 11 (Saros 110)	1876 Mar 10 (Saros 111)	1887 Feb 08 (Saros 112)	1898 Jan 08 (Saros 113)	1908 Dec 07 (Saros 114)
1919 Nov 07 (Saros 115)	1930 Oct 07 (Saros 116)	1941 Sep 05 (Saros 117)	1952 Aug 05 (Saros 118)	1963 Jul 06 (Saros 119)
1974 Jun 04 (Saros 120)	1985 May 04 (Saros 121)	1996 Apr 04 (Saros 122)	2007 Mar 03 (Saros 123)	2018 Jan 31 (Saros 124)
2028 Dec 31 (Saros 125)	2039 Nov 30 (Saros 126)	2050 Oct 30 (Saros 127)	2061 Sep 29 (Saros 128)	2072 Aug 28 (Saros 129)
2083 Jul 29 (Saros 130)	2094 Jun 28 (Saros 131)	2105 May 28 (Saros 132)	2116 Apr 27 (Saros 133)	2127 Mar 28 (Saros 134)
2138 Feb 24 (Saros 135)	2149 Jan 23 (Saros 136)	2159 Dec 24 (Saros 137)	2170 Nov 23 (Saros 138)	2181 Oct 22 (Saros 139)
2192 Sep 21 (Saros 140)

=== Inex series ===
This eclipse is a part of the long period inex cycle, repeating at alternating nodes, every 358 synodic months (≈ 10,571.95 days, or 29 years minus 20 days). Their appearance and longitude are irregular due to a lack of synchronization with the anomalistic month (period of perigee). However, groupings of 3 inex cycles (≈ 87 years minus 2 months) comes close (≈ 1,151.02 anomalistic months), so eclipses are similar in these groupings.

Series members between 1801 and 2200
1812 Feb 27 (Saros 120)	1841 Feb 06 (Saros 121)	1870 Jan 17 (Saros 122)
1898 Dec 27 (Saros 123)	1927 Dec 08 (Saros 124)	1956 Nov 18 (Saros 125)
1985 Oct 28 (Saros 126)	2014 Oct 08 (Saros 127)	2043 Sep 19 (Saros 128)
2072 Aug 28 (Saros 129)	2101 Aug 09 (Saros 130)	2130 Jul 21 (Saros 131)
2159 Jun 30 (Saros 132)	2188 Jun 09 (Saros 133)	

=== Half-Saros cycle ===
A lunar eclipse will be preceded and followed by solar eclipses by 9 years and 5.5 days (a half saros). This lunar eclipse is related to two total solar eclipses of Solar Saros 136.

August 24, 2063	September 3, 2081

== See also ==
- List of lunar eclipses and List of 21st-century lunar eclipses
