= Lunar Saros 129 =

Series of lunar eclipses

Member 38
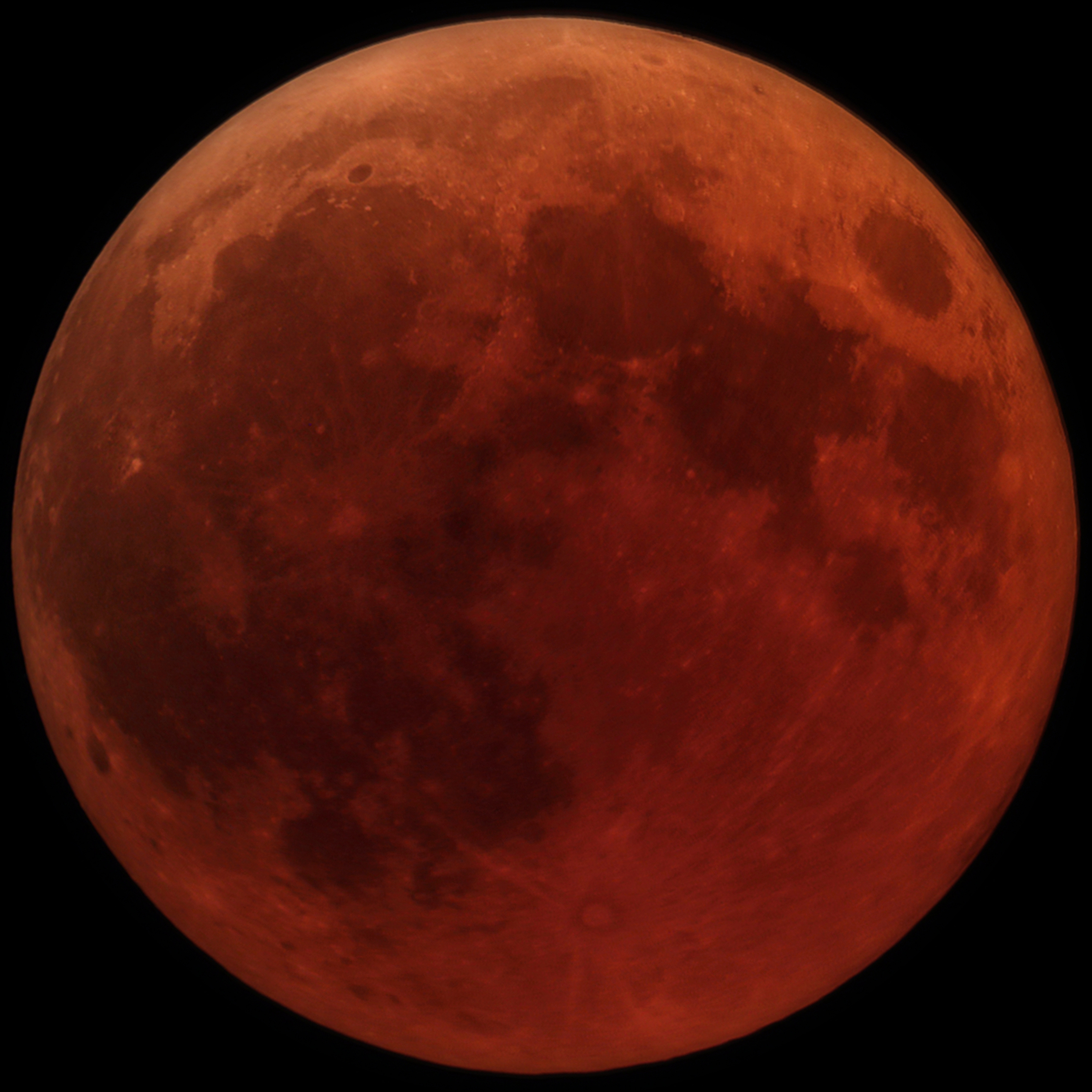

2018 July 27

Saros cycle series 129 for lunar eclipses occurs at the moon's descending node, repeats every 18 years 11 1/3 days. The 129th lunar saros is associated with Solar Saros 136.

Lunar saros 129 contains 71 member events, with 70 eclipses in which the penumbral (or eclipse) magnitude is over 0.01 . It has 11 total eclipses, starting in 1910 and ending in 2090.

Solar saros 136 interleaves with the 129th lunar saros, with an event occurring every 9 years 5 days alternating between each saros series. It consisted of 10 penumbral eclipses, 21 partial eclipses, 11 total eclipses, 21 partial eclipses, and ends with 8 penumbral eclipses.

== Summary ==
This eclipse is a part of Saros series 129, repeating every 18 years, 11 days, and containing 71 events. The series started with a penumbral lunar eclipse on June 10, 1351. It contains partial eclipses from September 26, 1531 through May 11, 1892; total eclipses from May 24, 1910 through September 8, 2090; and a second set of partial eclipses from September 20, 2108 through April 26, 2469. The series ends at member 71 as a penumbral eclipse on July 24, 2613.

The longest duration of totality was produced by member 37 at 106 minutes, 24 seconds on July 16, 2000. All eclipses in this series occur at the Moon’s descending node of orbit.

Greatest	First			
The greatest eclipse of the series occurred on 2000 Jul 16, lasting 106 minutes, 24 seconds.	Penumbral	Partial	Total	Central
The greatest eclipse of the series occurred on 2000 Jul 16, lasting 106 minutes, 24 seconds.	1351 Jun 10	1531 Sep 26	1910 May 24	1946 Jun 14
The greatest eclipse of the series occurred on 2000 Jul 16, lasting 106 minutes, 24 seconds.	Last			
The greatest eclipse of the series occurred on 2000 Jul 16, lasting 106 minutes, 24 seconds.	Central	Total	Partial	Penumbral
The greatest eclipse of the series occurred on 2000 Jul 16, lasting 106 minutes, 24 seconds.	2036 Aug 07	2090 Sep 08	2469 Apr 26	2613 Jul 24

Eclipses are tabulated in three columns; every third eclipse in the same column is one exeligmos apart, so they all cast shadows over approximately the same parts of the Earth.

Series members 26–48 occur between 1801 and 2200:
26	27	28
1802 Mar 19	1820 Mar 29	1838 Apr 10
29	30	31
1856 Apr 20	1874 May 01	1892 May 11
32	33	34
1910 May 24	1928 Jun 03	1946 Jun 14
35	36	37
1964 Jun 25	1982 Jul 06	2000 Jul 16
38	39	40
2018 Jul 27	2036 Aug 07	2054 Aug 18
41	42	43
2072 Aug 28	2090 Sep 08	2108 Sep 20
44	45	46
2126 Oct 01	2144 Oct 11	2162 Oct 23
47	48	
2180 Nov 02	2198 Nov 13	

== List ==
Cat.	Saros	Mem	Date	Time UT (hr:mn)	Type	Gamma	Magnitude	Duration (min)			Contacts UT (hr:mn)						Chart
Cat.	Saros	Mem	Date	Greatest	Type	Gamma	Magnitude	Pen.	Par.	Tot.	P1	P4	U1	U2	U3	U4	Chart
08095	129	1	1351 Jun 10	8:50:44	Penumbral	-1.5474	-0.9709	24.8			8:38:20	9:03:08					
08136	129	2	1369 Jun 20	16:01:26	Penumbral	-1.4792	-0.8474	101.7			15:10:35	16:52:17					
08177	129	3	1387 Jul 01	23:09:54	Penumbral	-1.4100	-0.7222	141.3			21:59:15	0:20:33					
08218	129	4	1405 Jul 12	6:20:21	Penumbral	-1.3426	-0.6007	170.4			4:55:09	7:45:33					
08259	129	5	1423 Jul 23	13:30:12	Penumbral	-1.2754	-0.4798	194.6			11:52:54	15:07:30					
08301	129	6	1441 Aug 02	20:45:02	Penumbral	-1.2127	-0.3675	214.1			18:57:59	22:32:05					
08342	129	7	1459 Aug 14	4:02:35	Penumbral	-1.1531	-0.2609	230.9			2:07:08	5:58:02					
08382	129	8	1477 Aug 24	11:25:47	Penumbral	-1.0986	-0.1639	244.9			9:23:20	13:28:14					
08422	129	9	1495 Sep 04	18:54:17	Penumbral	-1.0490	-0.0759	256.9			16:45:50	21:02:44					
08462	129	10	1513 Sep 15	2:30:22	Penumbral	-1.0060	-0.0003	266.8			0:16:58	4:43:46					
08503	129	11	1531 Sep 26	10:13:23	Partial	-0.9696	0.0634	275.0	58.4		7:55:53	12:30:53	9:44:11			10:42:35	
08544	129	12	1549 Oct 06	18:02:25	Partial	-0.9388	0.1168	281.9	78.9		15:41:28	20:23:22	17:22:58			18:41:52	
08588	129	13	1567 Oct 18	1:59:02	Partial	-0.9149	0.1576	287.4	91.4		23:35:20	4:22:44	1:13:20			2:44:44	
08631	129	14	1585 Nov 07	10:01:47	Partial	-0.8965	0.1885	291.8	99.8		7:35:53	12:27:41	9:11:53			10:51:41	
08674	129	15	1603 Nov 18	18:10:30	Partial	-0.8837	0.2093	295.3	105.2		15:42:51	20:38:09	17:17:54			19:03:06	
08719	129	16	1621 Nov 29	2:23:01	Partial	-0.8746	0.2237	298.1	108.8		23:53:58	4:52:04	1:28:37			3:17:25	
08763	129	17	1639 Dec 10	10:39:50	Partial	-0.8695	0.2308	300.1	110.7		8:09:47	13:09:53	9:44:29			11:35:11	
08807	129	18	1657 Dec 20	18:58:00	Partial	-0.8661	0.2353	301.9	112.0		16:27:03	21:28:57	18:02:00			19:54:00	
08852	129	19	1676 Jan 01	3:16:18	Partial	-0.8634	0.2389	303.4	113.1		0:44:36	5:48:00	2:19:45			4:12:51	
08898	129	20	1694 Jan 11	11:33:05	Partial	-0.8598	0.2444	305.0	114.6		9:00:35	14:05:35	10:35:47			12:30:23	
08945	129	21	1712 Jan 23	19:47:09	Partial	-0.8544	0.2535	306.7	116.8		17:13:48	22:20:30	18:48:45			20:45:33	
08992	129	22	1730 Feb 03	3:55:45	Partial	-0.8451	0.2702	308.9	120.6		1:21:18	6:30:12	2:55:27			4:56:03	
09038	129	23	1748 Feb 14	11:58:06	Partial	-0.8312	0.2956	311.7	126.0		9:22:15	14:33:57	10:55:06			13:01:06	
09085	129	24	1766 Feb 24	19:52:51	Partial	-0.8116	0.3317	315.2	133.0		17:15:15	22:30:27	18:46:21			20:59:21	
09130	129	25	1784 Mar 07	3:39:43	Partial	-0.7858	0.3792	319.4	141.5		1:00:01	6:19:25	2:28:58			4:50:28	
09175	129	26	1802 Mar 19	11:15:28	Partial	-0.7517	0.4422	324.4	151.7		8:33:16	13:57:40	9:59:37			12:31:19	
09220	129	27	1820 Mar 29	18:42:43	Partial	-0.7112	0.5171	330.0	162.4		15:57:43	21:27:43	17:21:31			20:03:55	
09266	129	28	1838 Apr 10	1:58:48	Partial	-0.6622	0.6076	336.1	173.9		23:10:45	4:46:51	0:31:51			3:25:45	
09312	129	29	1856 Apr 20	9:06:46	Partial	-0.6068	0.7098	342.3	185.1		6:15:37	11:57:55	7:34:13			10:39:19	
09356	129	30	1874 May 01	16:03:17	Partial	-0.5426	0.8282	348.7	196.2		13:08:56	18:57:38	14:25:11			17:41:23	
09400	129	31	1892 May 11	22:53:20	Partial	-0.4734	0.9555	354.7	206.3		19:55:59	1:50:41	21:10:11			0:36:29	
09443	129	32	1910 May 24	5:34:16	Total	-0.3975	1.0950	360.3	215.4	49.5	2:34:07	8:34:25	3:46:34	5:09:31	5:59:01	7:21:58	
09485	129	33	1928 Jun 03	12:09:57	Total	-0.3175	1.2421	365.2	223.0	75.3	9:07:21	15:12:33	10:18:27	11:32:18	12:47:36	14:01:27	
09527	129	34	1946 Jun 14	18:39:17	Total	-0.2324	1.3983	369.2	229.0	91.1	15:34:41	21:43:53	16:44:47	17:53:44	19:24:50	20:33:47	
09568	129	35	1964 Jun 25	1:06:50	Total	-0.1461	1.5565	372.1	233.2	100.8	22:00:47	4:12:53	23:10:14	0:16:26	1:57:14	3:03:26	
09609	129	36	1982 Jul 06	7:31:47	Total	-0.0579	1.7179	373.8	235.6	105.7	4:24:53	10:38:41	5:33:59	6:38:56	8:24:38	9:29:35	
09650	129	37	2000 Jul 16	13:56:39	Total	0.0302	1.7684	374.4	236.0	106.4	10:49:27	17:03:51	11:58:39	13:03:27	14:49:51	15:54:39	
09691	129	38	2018 Jul 27	20:22:54	Total	0.1168	1.6087	373.8	234.5	103.0	17:16:00	23:29:48	18:25:39	19:31:24	21:14:24	22:20:09	
09732	129	39	2036 Aug 07	2:52:32	Total	0.2004	1.4544	372.1	231.3	95.3	23:46:29	5:58:35	0:56:53	2:04:53	3:40:11	4:48:11	
09772	129	40	2054 Aug 18	9:26:30	Total	0.2806	1.3062	369.5	226.5	82.9	6:21:45	12:31:15	7:33:15	8:45:03	10:07:57	11:19:45	
09813	129	41	2072 Aug 28	16:05:42	Total	0.3563	1.1662	366.0	220.3	64.2	13:02:42	19:08:42	14:15:33	15:33:36	16:37:48	17:55:51	
09854	129	42	2090 Sep 08	22:52:29	Total	0.4257	1.0377	362.0	213.1	31.9	19:51:29	1:53:29	21:05:56	22:36:32	23:08:26	0:39:02	
09897	129	43	2108 Sep 20	5:47:11	Partial	0.4884	0.9213	357.6	205.1		2:48:23	8:45:59	4:04:38			7:29:44	
09939	129	44	2126 Oct 01	12:49:48	Partial	0.5446	0.8169	353.1	196.7		9:53:15	15:46:21	11:11:27			14:28:09	
09982	129	45	2144 Oct 11	20:02:14	Partial	0.5930	0.7269	348.7	188.3		17:07:53	22:56:35	18:28:05			21:36:23	
10026	129	46	2162 Oct 23	3:23:58	Partial	0.6340	0.6504	344.6	180.3		0:31:40	6:16:16	1:53:49			4:54:07	
10069	129	47	2180 Nov 02	10:55:47	Partial	0.6669	0.5891	341.0	173.2		8:05:17	13:46:17	9:29:11			12:22:23	
10112	129	48	2198 Nov 13	18:34:28	Partial	0.6944	0.5378	337.7	166.7		15:45:37	21:23:19	17:11:07			19:57:49	
10156	129	49	2216 Nov 25	2:22:56	Partial	0.7144	0.5005	335.1	161.6		23:35:23	5:10:29	1:02:08			3:43:44	
10200	129	50	2234 Dec 06	10:17:27	Partial	0.7300	0.4715	332.8	157.3		7:31:03	13:03:51	8:58:48			11:36:06	
10245	129	51	2252 Dec 16	18:18:41	Partial	0.7406	0.4522	331.0	154.3		15:33:11	21:04:11	17:01:32			19:35:50	
10291	129	52	2270 Dec 28	2:22:42	Partial	0.7493	0.4364	329.3	151.7		23:38:03	5:07:21	1:06:51			3:38:33	
10338	129	53	2289 Jan 07	10:30:56	Partial	0.7552	0.4263	327.8	149.9		7:47:02	13:14:50	9:15:59			11:45:53	
10385	129	54	2307 Jan 19	18:39:13	Partial	0.7616	0.4156	326.1	148.0		15:56:10	21:22:16	17:25:13			19:53:13	
10431	129	55	2325 Jan 30	2:46:50	Partial	0.7692	0.4033	324.2	145.8		0:04:44	5:28:56	1:33:56			3:59:44	
10477	129	56	2343 Feb 10	10:51:39	Partial	0.7796	0.3860	321.7	142.8		8:10:48	13:32:30	9:40:15			12:03:03	
10522	129	57	2361 Feb 20	18:53:07	Partial	0.7931	0.3633	318.7	138.7		16:13:46	21:32:28	17:43:46			20:02:28	
10567	129	58	2379 Mar 04	2:48:34	Partial	0.8120	0.3310	314.8	132.8		0:11:10	5:25:58	1:42:10			3:54:58	
10611	129	59	2397 Mar 14	10:38:04	Partial	0.8363	0.2891	310.0	124.6		8:03:04	13:13:04	9:35:46			11:40:22	
10656	129	60	2415 Mar 25	18:20:36	Partial	0.8667	0.2360	304.0	113.1		15:48:36	20:52:36	17:24:03			19:17:09	
10700	129	61	2433 Apr 05	1:56:44	Partial	0.9030	0.1723	296.8	97.3		23:28:20	4:25:08	1:08:05			2:45:23	
10744	129	62	2451 Apr 16	9:23:54	Partial	0.9471	0.0945	287.9	72.7		6:59:57	11:47:51	8:47:33			10:00:15	
10786	129	63	2469 Apr 26	16:45:33	Partial	0.9960	0.0077	277.6	20.9		14:26:45	19:04:21	16:35:06			16:56:00	
10828	129	64	2487 May 07	23:59:40	Penumbral	1.0516	-0.0913	265.1			21:47:07	2:12:13					
10869	129	65	2505 May 19	7:09:44	Penumbral	1.1112	-0.1978	250.7			5:04:23	9:15:05					
10910	129	66	2523 May 30	14:13:13	Penumbral	1.1767	-0.3152	233.4			12:16:31	16:09:55					
10950	129	67	2541 Jun 09	21:15:08	Penumbral	1.2440	-0.4361	213.4			19:28:26	23:01:50					
10992	129	68	2559 Jun 21	4:13:10	Penumbral	1.3146	-0.5634	189.5			2:38:25	5:47:55					
11033	129	69	2577 Jul 01	11:11:08	Penumbral	1.3860	-0.6922	160.6			9:50:50	12:31:26					
11073	129	70	2595 Jul 12	18:08:13	Penumbral	1.4585	-0.8234	123.4			17:06:31	19:09:55					
11113	129	71	2613 Jul 24	1:08:17	Penumbral	1.5292	-0.9514	67.7			0:34:26	1:42:08					

== See also ==
- List of lunar eclipses
  - List of Saros series for lunar eclipses
