= Solar eclipse of April 25, 1865 =

Total eclipse

- Total eclipse
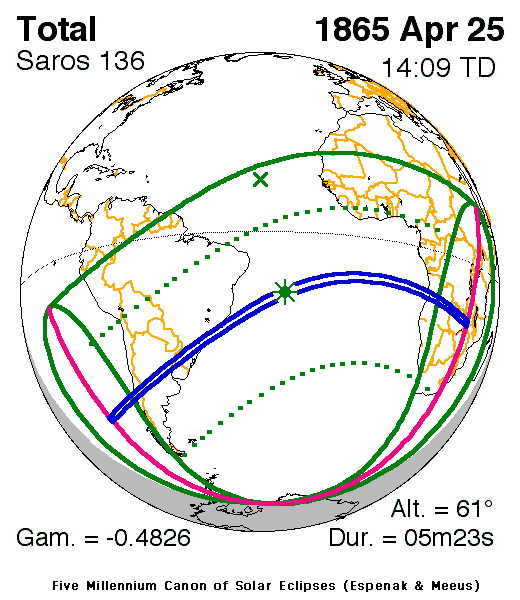
- Map
- Gamma: −0.4826
- Magnitude: 1.0584

Maximum eclipse
- Duration: 323 s (5 min 23 s)
- Coordinates: 14.8°S 25.8°W
- Max. width of band: 219 km (136 mi)

Times (UTC)
- Greatest eclipse: 14:08:34

References
- Saros: 136 (29 of 71)
- Catalog # (SE5000): 9199

A total solar eclipse occurred at the Moon's descending node of orbit on Tuesday, April 25, 1865, with a magnitude of 1.0584. A solar eclipse occurs when the Moon passes between Earth and the Sun, thereby totally or partly obscuring the image of the Sun for a viewer on Earth. A total solar eclipse occurs when the Moon's apparent diameter is larger than the Sun's, blocking all direct sunlight, turning day into darkness. Totality occurs in a narrow path across Earth's surface, with the partial solar eclipse visible over a surrounding region thousands of kilometres wide. Occurring about 1.2 days after perigee (on April 24, 1865, at 9:50 UTC), the Moon's apparent diameter was larger.

The path of totality was visible from parts of modern-day Chile, Argentina, Uruguay, Brazil, Angola, Zambia, and extreme northwestern Mozambique. A partial solar eclipse was also visible for much of South America, Antarctica, and Africa.

== Observations ==
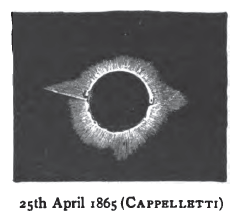

The total eclipse was also witnessed by the passengers and crew of the SS Great Britain, passing the coastline of Brazil en route from Australia to England; they were able to observe stars in the daytime.

== Eclipse details ==
Shown below are two tables displaying details about this particular solar eclipse. The first table outlines times at which the Moon's penumbra or umbra attains the specific parameter, and the second table describes various other parameters pertaining to this eclipse.

April 25, 1865 Solar Eclipse Times
| Event | Time (UTC) |
|---|---|
| First Penumbral External Contact | 1865 April 25 at 11:37:22.8 UTC |
| First Umbral External Contact | 1865 April 25 at 12:36:28.9 UTC |
| First Central Line | 1865 April 25 at 12:37:48.3 UTC |
| First Umbral Internal Contact | 1865 April 25 at 12:39:07.9 UTC |
| Equatorial Conjunction | 1865 April 25 at 13:56:13.5 UTC |
| Greatest Eclipse | 1865 April 25 at 14:08:34.2 UTC |
| Greatest Duration | 1865 April 25 at 14:10:32.0 UTC |
| Ecliptic Conjunction | 1865 April 25 at 14:13:31.6 UTC |
| Last Umbral Internal Contact | 1865 April 25 at 15:38:11.0 UTC |
| Last Central Line | 1865 April 25 at 15:39:29.2 UTC |
| Last Umbral External Contact | 1865 April 25 at 15:40:47.2 UTC |
| Last Penumbral External Contact | 1865 April 25 at 16:39:54.1 UTC |

April 25, 1865 Solar Eclipse Parameters
| Parameter | Value |
|---|---|
| Eclipse Magnitude | 1.05844 |
| Eclipse Obscuration | 1.12029 |
| Gamma | −0.48262 |
| Sun Right Ascension | 02h12m14.0s |
| Sun Declination | +13°18'55.3" |
| Sun Semi-Diameter | 15'53.1" |
| Sun Equatorial Horizontal Parallax | 08.7" |
| Moon Right Ascension | 02h12m42.7s |
| Moon Declination | +12°50'29.9" |
| Moon Semi-Diameter | 16'34.0" |
| Moon Equatorial Horizontal Parallax | 1°00'47.9" |
| ΔT | 5.6 s |

== Eclipse season ==
This eclipse is part of an eclipse season, a period, roughly every six months, when eclipses occur. Only two (or occasionally three) eclipse seasons occur each year, and each season lasts about 35 days and repeats just short of six months (173 days) later; thus two full eclipse seasons always occur each year. Either two or three eclipses happen each eclipse season. In the sequence below, each eclipse is separated by a fortnight.

Eclipse season of April 1865
| April 11 Ascending node (full moon) | April 25 Descending node (new moon) |
|---|---|
| Partial lunar eclipse Lunar Saros 110 | Total solar eclipse Solar Saros 136 |

== Related eclipses ==
=== Eclipses in 1865 ===
- A partial lunar eclipse on April 11.
- A total solar eclipse on April 25.
- A partial lunar eclipse on October 4.
- An annular solar eclipse on October 19.

=== Metonic ===
- Preceded by: Solar eclipse of July 8, 1861
- Followed by: Solar eclipse of February 11, 1869

=== Tzolkinex ===
- Preceded by: Solar eclipse of March 15, 1858
- Followed by: Solar eclipse of June 6, 1872

=== Half-Saros ===
- Preceded by: Lunar eclipse of April 20, 1856
- Followed by: Lunar eclipse of May 1, 1874

=== Tritos ===
- Preceded by: Solar eclipse of May 26, 1854
- Followed by: Solar eclipse of March 25, 1876

=== Solar Saros 136 ===
- Preceded by: Solar eclipse of April 15, 1847
- Followed by: Solar eclipse of May 6, 1883

=== Inex ===
- Preceded by: Solar eclipse of May 15, 1836
- Followed by: Solar eclipse of April 6, 1894

=== Triad ===
- Preceded by: Solar eclipse of June 24, 1778
- Followed by: Solar eclipse of February 25, 1952

=== Solar eclipses of 1862–1866 ===
This eclipse is a member of a semester series. An eclipse in a semester series of solar eclipses repeats approximately every 177 days and 4 hours (a semester) at alternating nodes of the Moon's orbit.

The partial solar eclipses on June 27, 1862 and December 21, 1862 occur in the previous lunar year eclipse set, and the partial solar eclipse on March 16, 1866 occurs in the next lunar year eclipse set.

Solar eclipse series sets from 1862 to 1866
| Ascending node | | | Descending node | | |
| Saros | Map | Gamma | Saros | Map | Gamma |
| 111 | November 21, 1862 Partial | −1.5052 | 116 | May 17, 1863 Partial | 1.0627 |
| 121 | November 11, 1863 Annular | −0.8760 | 126 | May 6, 1864 Hybrid | 0.2622 |
| 131 | October 30, 1864 Annular | −0.1816 | 136 | April 25, 1865 Total | −0.4826 |
| 141 | October 19, 1865 Annular | 0.5366 | 146 | April 15, 1866 Partial | −1.1846 |
| 151 | October 8, 1866 Partial | 1.2296 | | | |

=== Saros 136 ===
This eclipse is a part of Saros series 136, repeating every 18 years, 11 days, and containing 71 events. The series started with a partial solar eclipse on June 14, 1360. It contains annular eclipses from September 8, 1504 through November 12, 1594; hybrid eclipses from November 22, 1612 through January 17, 1703; and total eclipses from January 27, 1721 through May 13, 2496. The series ends at member 71 as a partial eclipse on July 30, 2622. Its eclipses are tabulated in three columns; every third eclipse in the same column is one exeligmos apart, so they all cast shadows over approximately the same parts of the Earth.

The longest duration of annularity was produced by member 9 at 32 seconds on September 8, 1504, and the longest duration of totality was produced by member 34 at 7 minutes, 7.74 seconds on June 20, 1955. All eclipses in this series occur at the Moon’s descending node of orbit.

Series members 26–47 occur between 1801 and 2200:
| 26 | 27 | 28 |
|---|---|---|
| March 24, 1811 | April 3, 1829 | April 15, 1847 |
| 29 | 30 | 31 |
| April 25, 1865 | May 6, 1883 | May 18, 1901 |
| 32 | 33 | 34 |
| May 29, 1919 | June 8, 1937 | June 20, 1955 |
| 35 | 36 | 37 |
| June 30, 1973 | July 11, 1991 | July 22, 2009 |
| 38 | 39 | 40 |
| August 2, 2027 | August 12, 2045 | August 24, 2063 |
| 41 | 42 | 43 |
| September 3, 2081 | September 14, 2099 | September 26, 2117 |
| 44 | 45 | 46 |
| October 7, 2135 | October 17, 2153 | October 29, 2171 |
47
November 8, 2189

=== Metonic series ===
The metonic series repeats eclipses every 19 years (6939.69 days), lasting about 5 cycles. Eclipses occur in nearly the same calendar date. In addition, the octon subseries repeats 1/5 of that or every 3.8 years (1387.94 days). All eclipses in this table occur at the Moon's ascending node.

25 eclipse events between February 12, 1812 and September 18, 1895
| February 11–12 | November 30–December 1 | September 17–19 | July 7–8 | April 25–26 |
| 108 | 110 | 112 | 114 | 116 |
|---|---|---|---|---|
| February 12, 1812 | | September 19, 1819 | July 8, 1823 | April 26, 1827 |
| 118 | 120 | 122 | 124 | 126 |
| February 12, 1831 | November 30, 1834 | September 18, 1838 | July 8, 1842 | April 25, 1846 |
| 128 | 130 | 132 | 134 | 136 |
| February 12, 1850 | November 30, 1853 | September 18, 1857 | July 8, 1861 | April 25, 1865 |
| 138 | 140 | 142 | 144 | 146 |
| February 11, 1869 | November 30, 1872 | September 17, 1876 | July 7, 1880 | April 25, 1884 |
| 148 | 150 | 152 | | |
| February 11, 1888 | December 1, 1891 | September 18, 1895 | | |

=== Tritos series ===
This eclipse is a part of a tritos cycle, repeating at alternating nodes every 135 synodic months (≈ 3986.63 days, or 11 years minus 1 month). Their appearance and longitude are irregular due to a lack of synchronization with the anomalistic month (period of perigee), but groupings of 3 tritos cycles (≈ 33 years minus 3 months) come close (≈ 434.044 anomalistic months), so eclipses are similar in these groupings.

The partial solar eclipses on December 7, 2170 (part of Saros 164) and November 7, 2181 (part of Saros 165) are also a part of this series but are not included in the table below.

Series members between 1801 and 2105
| September 28, 1810 (Saros 131) | August 27, 1821 (Saros 132) | July 27, 1832 (Saros 133) | June 27, 1843 (Saros 134) | May 26, 1854 (Saros 135) |
| April 25, 1865 (Saros 136) | March 25, 1876 (Saros 137) | February 22, 1887 (Saros 138) | January 22, 1898 (Saros 139) | December 23, 1908 (Saros 140) |
| November 22, 1919 (Saros 141) | October 21, 1930 (Saros 142) | September 21, 1941 (Saros 143) | August 20, 1952 (Saros 144) | July 20, 1963 (Saros 145) |
| June 20, 1974 (Saros 146) | May 19, 1985 (Saros 147) | April 17, 1996 (Saros 148) | March 19, 2007 (Saros 149) | February 15, 2018 (Saros 150) |
| January 14, 2029 (Saros 151) | December 15, 2039 (Saros 152) | November 14, 2050 (Saros 153) | October 13, 2061 (Saros 154) | September 12, 2072 (Saros 155) |
| August 13, 2083 (Saros 156) | July 12, 2094 (Saros 157) | June 12, 2105 (Saros 158) | | |

=== Inex series ===
This eclipse is a part of the long period inex cycle, repeating at alternating nodes, every 358 synodic months (≈ 10,571.95 days, or 29 years minus 20 days). Their appearance and longitude are irregular due to a lack of synchronization with the anomalistic month (period of perigee). However, groupings of 3 inex cycles (≈ 87 years minus 2 months) comes close (≈ 1,151.02 anomalistic months), so eclipses are similar in these groupings.

Series members between 1801 and 2200
| June 6, 1807 (Saros 134) | May 15, 1836 (Saros 135) | April 25, 1865 (Saros 136) |
| April 6, 1894 (Saros 137) | March 17, 1923 (Saros 138) | February 25, 1952 (Saros 139) |
| February 4, 1981 (Saros 140) | January 15, 2010 (Saros 141) | December 26, 2038 (Saros 142) |
| December 6, 2067 (Saros 143) | November 15, 2096 (Saros 144) | October 26, 2125 (Saros 145) |
| October 7, 2154 (Saros 146) | September 16, 2183 (Saros 147) | |
