= Solar eclipse of May 6, 1883 =

Total eclipse

- Total eclipse
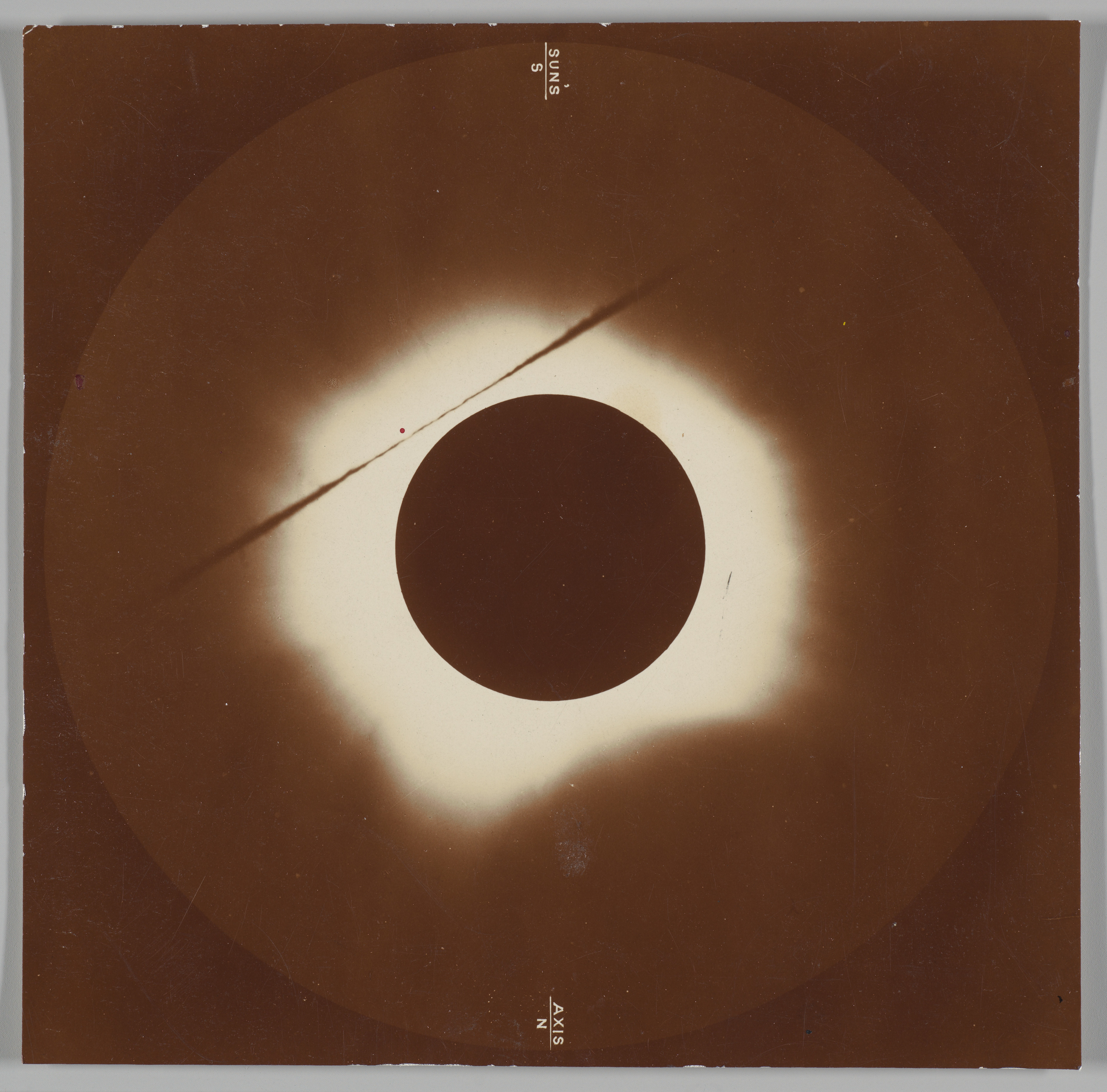
- Caroline Atoll, Caroline Islands.

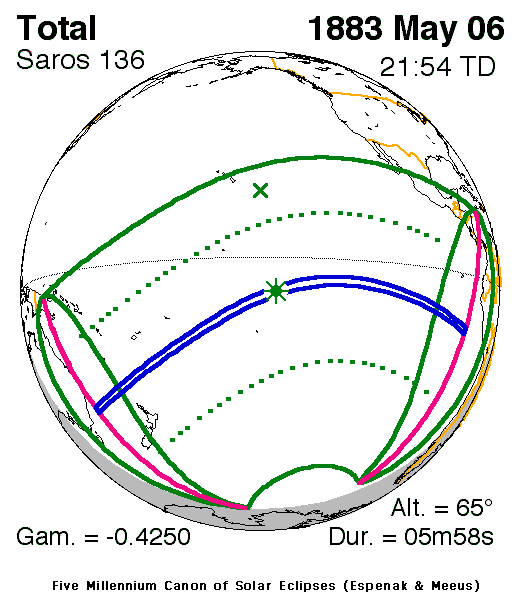
- Map
- Gamma: −0.425
- Magnitude: 1.0634

Maximum eclipse
- Duration: 358 s (5 min 58 s)
- Coordinates: 8.1°S 144.6°W
- Max. width of band: 229 km (142 mi)

Times (UTC)
- Greatest eclipse: 21:53:49

References
- Saros: 136 (30 of 71)
- Catalog # (SE5000): 9241

A total solar eclipse occurred at the Moon's descending node of orbit between Sunday, May 6, and Monday, May 7, 1883, with a magnitude of 1.0634. A solar eclipse occurs when the Moon passes between Earth and the Sun, thereby totally or partly obscuring the image of the Sun for a viewer on Earth. A total solar eclipse occurs when the Moon's apparent diameter is larger than the Sun's, blocking all direct sunlight, turning day into darkness. Totality occurs in a narrow path across Earth's surface, with the partial solar eclipse visible over a surrounding region thousands of kilometres wide. Occurring about 1.1 days after perigee (on May 5, 1883, at 20:20 UTC), the Moon's apparent diameter was larger.

The path of totality was visible from parts of the South Pacific Ocean. A partial solar eclipse was also visible for parts of eastern Australia, Oceania, Hawaii, Central America, and western South America.

== Eclipse details ==
Shown below are two tables displaying details about this particular solar eclipse. The first table outlines times at which the Moon's penumbra or umbra attains the specific parameter, and the second table describes various other parameters pertaining to this eclipse.

May 6, 1883 Solar Eclipse Times
Event	Time (UTC)
First Penumbral External Contact	1883 May 6 at 19:21:10.1 UTC
First Umbral External Contact	1883 May 6 at 20:18:44.5 UTC
First Central Line	1883 May 6 at 20:20:08.5 UTC
First Umbral Internal Contact	1883 May 6 at 20:21:32.7 UTC
First Penumbral Internal Contact	1883 May 6 at 21:34:45.7 UTC
Equatorial Conjunction	1883 May 6 at 21:45:09.2 UTC
Greatest Eclipse	1883 May 6 at 21:53:48.9 UTC
Greatest Duration	1883 May 6 at 21:56:03.6 UTC
Ecliptic Conjunction	1883 May 6 at 21:58:10.3 UTC
Last Penumbral Internal Contact	1883 May 6 at 22:13:04.8 UTC
Last Umbral Internal Contact	1883 May 6 at 23:26:12.7 UTC
Last Central Line	1883 May 6 at 23:27:35.7 UTC
Last Umbral External Contact	1883 May 6 at 23:28:58.4 UTC
Last Penumbral External Contact	1883 May 7 at 00:26:34.2 UTC

May 6, 1883 Solar Eclipse Parameters
Parameter	Value
Eclipse Magnitude	1.06341
Eclipse Obscuration	1.13085
Gamma	−0.42503
Sun Right Ascension	02h54m04.8s
Sun Declination	+16°37'58.2"
Sun Semi-Diameter	15'50.7"
Sun Equatorial Horizontal Parallax	08.7"
Moon Right Ascension	02h54m25.5s
Moon Declination	+16°12'38.1"
Moon Semi-Diameter	16'35.5"
Moon Equatorial Horizontal Parallax	1°00'53.6"
ΔT	-5.6 s

== Eclipse season ==
This eclipse is part of an eclipse season, a period, roughly every six months, when eclipses occur. Only two (or occasionally three) eclipse seasons occur each year, and each season lasts about 35 days and repeats just short of six months (173 days) later; thus two full eclipse seasons always occur each year. Either two or three eclipses happen each eclipse season. In the sequence below, each eclipse is separated by a fortnight.

Eclipse season of April–May 1883
April 22 Ascending node (full moon)	May 6 Descending node (new moon)
Partial lunar eclipse Lunar Saros 110	Total solar eclipse Solar Saros 136

== Related eclipses ==
=== Eclipses in 1883 ===
- A partial lunar eclipse on April 22.
- A total solar eclipse on May 6.
- A partial lunar eclipse on October 16.
- An annular solar eclipse on October 30.

=== Metonic ===
- Preceded by: Solar eclipse of July 19, 1879
- Followed by: Solar eclipse of February 22, 1887

=== Tzolkinex ===
- Preceded by: Solar eclipse of March 25, 1876
- Followed by: Solar eclipse of June 17, 1890

=== Half-Saros ===
- Preceded by: Lunar eclipse of May 1, 1874
- Followed by: Lunar eclipse of May 11, 1892

=== Tritos ===
- Preceded by: Solar eclipse of June 6, 1872
- Followed by: Solar eclipse of April 6, 1894

=== Solar Saros 136 ===
- Preceded by: Solar eclipse of April 25, 1865
- Followed by: Solar eclipse of May 18, 1901

=== Inex ===
- Preceded by: Solar eclipse of May 26, 1854
- Followed by: Solar eclipse of April 17, 1912

=== Triad ===
- Preceded by: Solar eclipse of July 4, 1796
- Followed by: Solar eclipse of March 7, 1970

=== Solar eclipses of 1880–1884 ===
This eclipse is a member of a semester series. An eclipse in a semester series of solar eclipses repeats approximately every 177 days and 4 hours (a semester) at alternating nodes of the Moon's orbit.

The solar eclipses on January 11, 1880 (total), July 7, 1880 (annular), and December 31, 1880 (partial) occur in the previous lunar year eclipse set, and the partial solar eclipse on March 27, 1884 occurs in the next lunar year eclipse set.

Solar eclipse series sets from 1880 to 1884
Ascending node			Descending node		
Saros	Map	Gamma	Saros	Map	Gamma
111	December 2, 1880 Partial	−1.5172	116	May 27, 1881 Partial	1.1345
121	November 21, 1881 Annular	−0.8931	126	May 17, 1882 Total	0.3269
131	November 10, 1882 Annular	−0.2056	136	May 6, 1883 Total	−0.4250
141	October 30, 1883 Annular	0.5030	146	April 25, 1884 Partial	−1.1365
151	October 19, 1884 Partial	1.1892			

=== Saros 136 ===
This eclipse is a part of Saros series 136, repeating every 18 years, 11 days, and containing 71 events. The series started with a partial solar eclipse on June 14, 1360. It contains annular eclipses from September 8, 1504 through November 12, 1594; hybrid eclipses from November 22, 1612 through January 17, 1703; and total eclipses from January 27, 1721 through May 13, 2496. The series ends at member 71 as a partial eclipse on July 30, 2622. Its eclipses are tabulated in three columns; every third eclipse in the same column is one exeligmos apart, so they all cast shadows over approximately the same parts of the Earth.

The longest duration of annularity was produced by member 9 at 32 seconds on September 8, 1504, and the longest duration of totality was produced by member 34 at 7 minutes, 7.74 seconds on June 20, 1955. All eclipses in this series occur at the Moon’s descending node of orbit.

Series members 26–47 occur between 1801 and 2200:
26	27	28
March 24, 1811	April 3, 1829	April 15, 1847
29	30	31
April 25, 1865	May 6, 1883	May 18, 1901
32	33	34
May 29, 1919	June 8, 1937	June 20, 1955
35	36	37
June 30, 1973	July 11, 1991	July 22, 2009
38	39	40
August 2, 2027	August 12, 2045	August 24, 2063
41	42	43
September 3, 2081	September 14, 2099	September 26, 2117
44	45	46
October 7, 2135	October 17, 2153	October 29, 2171
47
November 8, 2189

=== Metonic series ===
The metonic series repeats eclipses every 19 years (6939.69 days), lasting about 5 cycles. Eclipses occur in nearly the same calendar date. In addition, the octon subseries repeats 1/5 of that or every 3.8 years (1387.94 days). All eclipses in this table occur at the Moon's descending node.

22 eclipse events between February 23, 1830 and July 19, 1917
February 22–23	December 11–12	September 29–30	July 18–19	May 6–7
108	110	112	114	116
February 23, 1830			July 18, 1841	May 6, 1845
118	120	122	124	126
February 23, 1849	December 11, 1852	September 29, 1856	July 18, 1860	May 6, 1864
128	130	132	134	136
February 23, 1868	December 12, 1871	September 29, 1875	July 19, 1879	May 6, 1883
138	140	142	144	146
February 22, 1887	December 12, 1890	September 29, 1894	July 18, 1898	May 7, 1902
148	150	152	154	
February 23, 1906	December 12, 1909	September 30, 1913	July 19, 1917	

=== Tritos series ===
This eclipse is a part of a tritos cycle, repeating at alternating nodes every 135 synodic months (≈ 3986.63 days, or 11 years minus 1 month). Their appearance and longitude are irregular due to a lack of synchronization with the anomalistic month (period of perigee), but groupings of 3 tritos cycles (≈ 33 years minus 3 months) come close (≈ 434.044 anomalistic months), so eclipses are similar in these groupings.

The partial solar eclipses on December 18, 2188 (part of Saros 164) and November 18, 2199 (part of Saros 165) are also a part of this series but are not included in the table below.

Series members between 1801 and 2134
December 10, 1806 (Saros 129)	November 9, 1817 (Saros 130)	October 9, 1828 (Saros 131)	September 7, 1839 (Saros 132)	August 7, 1850 (Saros 133)
July 8, 1861 (Saros 134)	June 6, 1872 (Saros 135)	May 6, 1883 (Saros 136)	April 6, 1894 (Saros 137)	March 6, 1905 (Saros 138)
February 3, 1916 (Saros 139)	January 3, 1927 (Saros 140)	December 2, 1937 (Saros 141)	November 1, 1948 (Saros 142)	October 2, 1959 (Saros 143)
August 31, 1970 (Saros 144)	July 31, 1981 (Saros 145)	June 30, 1992 (Saros 146)	May 31, 2003 (Saros 147)	April 29, 2014 (Saros 148)
March 29, 2025 (Saros 149)	February 27, 2036 (Saros 150)	January 26, 2047 (Saros 151)	December 26, 2057 (Saros 152)	November 24, 2068 (Saros 153)
October 24, 2079 (Saros 154)	September 23, 2090 (Saros 155)	August 24, 2101 (Saros 156)	July 23, 2112 (Saros 157)	June 23, 2123 (Saros 158)
May 23, 2134 (Saros 159)

=== Inex series ===
This eclipse is a part of the long period inex cycle, repeating at alternating nodes, every 358 synodic months (≈ 10,571.95 days, or 29 years minus 20 days). Their appearance and longitude are irregular due to a lack of synchronization with the anomalistic month (period of perigee). However, groupings of 3 inex cycles (≈ 87 years minus 2 months) comes close (≈ 1,151.02 anomalistic months), so eclipses are similar in these groupings.

Series members between 1801 and 2200
June 16, 1825 (Saros 134)	May 26, 1854 (Saros 135)	May 6, 1883 (Saros 136)
April 17, 1912 (Saros 137)	March 27, 1941 (Saros 138)	March 7, 1970 (Saros 139)
February 16, 1999 (Saros 140)	January 26, 2028 (Saros 141)	January 5, 2057 (Saros 142)
December 16, 2085 (Saros 143)	November 27, 2114 (Saros 144)	November 7, 2143 (Saros 145)
October 17, 2172 (Saros 146)		
