= Solar Saros 136 =

Saros cycle series 136 for solar eclipses

Animated path of entire Saros.

Saros cycle series 136 for solar eclipses occurs at the Moon's descending node, repeating every 18 years, 11 days, containing 71 eclipses, 56 of which are umbral (6 annular, 6 hybrid, 44 total). The first observation of the eclipse in the series was on 14 June 1360 and the most recent eclipse was a total eclipse on 22 July 2009, after which the next will be a total eclipse on 2 August 2027.

The longest totality was 7 minutes 7.74 seconds on 20 June 1955 (also the longest total eclipse of the 20th century) while the longest annular eclipse was just 32 seconds on 8 September 1504.

This series is currently producing the longest total solar eclipses of any active series. It produced the six longest total solar eclipses of the 20th century, three of them over seven minutes long. It also produced the longest total eclipse of the 21st century at 6 min 38.86 sec on 22 July 2009, and overall will produce the 21st century's three longest total eclipses. Each eclipse is getting slightly shorter and this series will be surpassed in total eclipse length by Solar Saros 139 (whose eclipses are getting slightly longer) on May 11, 2078. Saros 136 in turn surpassed the previous longest-eclipse series, Saros 133, with its member event on May 18th, 1901. It produced the most central total eclipse between the years 1209 and 2718 and the greatest magnitude of any eclipse since the year 540 on July 11, 1991.

This solar saros is linked to Lunar Saros 129.

== Umbral eclipses ==
Umbral eclipses (annular, total and hybrid) can be further classified as either: 1) Central (two limits), 2) Central (one limit) or 3) Non-Central (one limit). The statistical distribution of these classes in Saros series 136 appears in the following table.

Classification	Number	Percent
All Umbral eclipses	56	100.00%
Central (two limits)	56	100.00%
Central (one limit)	0	0.00%
Non-central (one limit)	0	0.00%

== Gallery ==
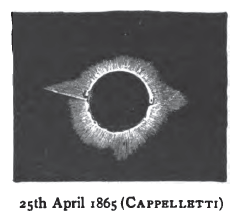
April 25, 1865.
Series member 29

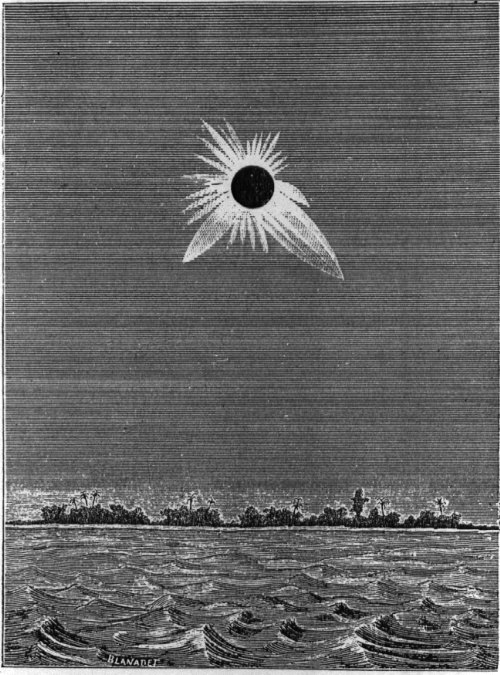
An artist's depiction of the total solar eclipse of May 6, 1883, observed from Caroline Atoll, Line Islands.
Series member 30

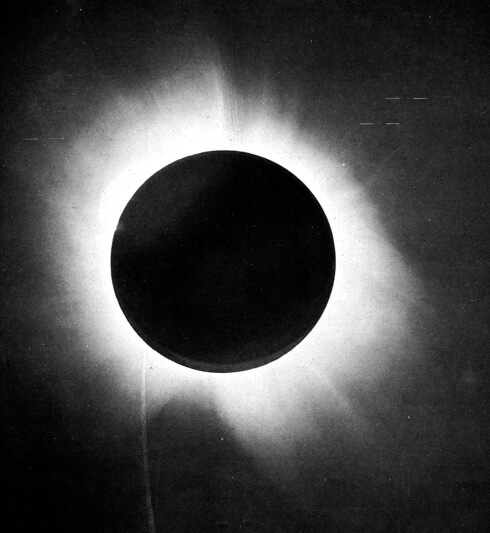
The total solar eclipse of May 29, 1919, observed from the island of Principe. Positions of star images within the field near the Sun were used to verify Albert Einstein's prediction of the bending of light around the Sun from his general theory of relativity.
Series member 32

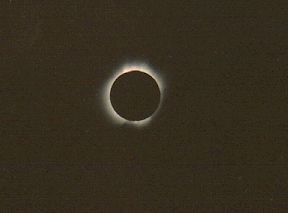
Total solar eclipse of July 11, 1991 from Costa Rica.
Series member 36

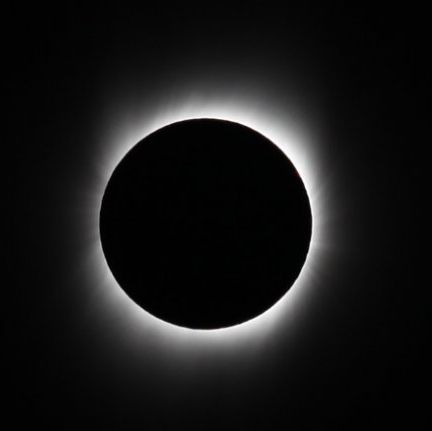
Total solar eclipse of July 22, 2009 from Bangladesh.
Series member 37

== All eclipses ==
Note: Dates are given in the Julian calendar prior to 15 October 1582, and in the Gregorian calendar after that.

Saros	Member	Date	Time (Greatest) UTC	Type	Location Lat, Long	Gamma	Mag.	Width (km)	Duration (min:sec)	Ref
136	1	June 14, 1360	5:56:04	Partial	65.8S 78.2E	-1.5227	0.0495			
136	2	June 25, 1378	12:45:16	Partial	64.8S 34.2W	-1.4392	0.1976			
136	3	July 5, 1396	19:37:40	Partial	63.9S 147.2W	-1.3568	0.3449			
136	4	July 17, 1414	2:35:03	Partial	63.1S 99E	-1.277	0.4881			
136	5	July 27, 1432	9:39:02	Partial	62.4S 16.3W	-1.2011	0.625			
136	6	August 7, 1450	16:48:49	Partial	61.8S 132.8W	-1.1286	0.756			
136	7	August 18, 1468	0:08:08	Partial	61.3S 108.4E	-1.0627	0.8753			
136	8	August 29, 1486	7:34:56	Partial	61S 12.1W	-1.0018	0.9856			
136	9	September 8, 1504	15:12:15	Annular	55.3S 102.6W	-0.9486	0.9924	83	0m 32s	
136	10	September 19, 1522	22:57:33	Annular	53.9S 146.1E	-0.9011	0.9946	42	0m 23s	
136	11	September 30, 1540	6:54:11	Annular	54.6S 29.2E	-0.862	0.996	27	0m 17s	
136	12	October 11, 1558	14:58:55	Annular	56.5S 90.3W	-0.8289	0.9971	18	0m 12s	
136	13	October 21, 1576	23:13:06	Annular	59.2S 147.9E	-0.8031	0.9981	11	0m 8s	
136	14	November 12, 1594	7:34:49	Annular	62.4S 25.1E	-0.7829	0.9991	5	0m 4s	
136	15	November 22, 1612	16:04:35	Hybrid	65.7S 98.4W	-0.7691	1.0002	1	0m 1s	
136	16	December 4, 1630	0:38:59	Hybrid	68.7S 139.6E	-0.7585	1.0017	9	0m 7s	
136	17	December 14, 1648	9:17:55	Hybrid	70.9S 19.6E	-0.751	1.0035	18	0m 14s	
136	18	December 25, 1666	17:59:16	Hybrid	71.6S 98.3W	-0.7452	1.0058	30	0m 24s	
136	19	January 5, 1685	2:42:50	Hybrid	70.7S 143.1E	-0.7409	1.0086	44	0m 35s	
136	20	January 17, 1703	11:24:25	Hybrid	67.9S 22.2E	-0.7345	1.012	61	0m 50s	
136	21	January 27, 1721	20:05:11	Total	64S 102.4W	-0.7269	1.0158	79	1m 7s	
136	22	February 8, 1739	4:41:13	Total	59.2S 131E	-0.7149	1.0203	99	1m 27s	
136	23	February 18, 1757	13:14:12	Total	53.8S 2.9E	-0.6999	1.0251	119	1m 51s	
136	24	March 1, 1775	21:39:20	Total	47.9S 124.8W	-0.6783	1.0304	139	2m 20s	
136	25	March 12, 1793	6:00:07	Total	41.7S 107.8E	-0.6524	1.0359	158	2m 51s	
136	26	March 24, 1811	14:12:13	Total	35.2S 18W	-0.619	1.0416	176	3m 27s	
136	27	April 3, 1829	22:18:36	Total	28.5S 142.6W	-0.5803	1.0474	192	4m 5s	
136	28	April 15, 1847	6:16:13	Total	21.6S 95E	-0.5339	1.053	206	4m 44s	
136	29	April 25, 1865	14:08:34	Total	14.8S 25.8W	-0.4826	1.0584	219	5m 23s	
136	30	May 6, 1883	21:53:49	Total	8.1S 144.6W	-0.425	1.0634	229	5m 58s	
136	31	May 18, 1901	5:33:48	Total	1.7S 98.4E	-0.3626	1.068	238	6m 29s	
136	32	May 29, 1919	13:08:55	Total	4.4N 16.7W	-0.29549	1.07186	244.4	6m 50.75s	
136	33	June 8, 1937	20:41:02	Total	9.9N 130.5W	-0.22532	1.07513	249.8	7m 4.06s	
136	34	June 20, 1955	4:10:42	Total	14.8N 117E	-0.15278	1.07756	253.7	7m 7.74s	
136	35	June 30, 1973	11:38:41	Total	18.8N 5.6E	-0.07853	1.07921	256.5	7m 3.55s	
136	36	July 11, 1991	19:06:58	Total	22N 105.2W	-0.00412	1.07997	258	6m 53.08s	
136	37	July 22, 2009	2:35:14	Total	24.2N 144.1E	0.06977	1.07991	258.5	6m 38.86s	
136	38	August 2, 2027	10:07:50	Total	25.5N 33.2E	0.14209	1.07903	257.7	6m 22.64s	
136	39	August 12, 2045	17:42:39	Total	25.9N 78.5W	0.21161	1.07736	255.6	6m 5.71s	
136	40	August 24, 2063	1:22:11	Total	25.6N 168.4E	0.2771	1.075	252	5m 49s	
136	41	September 3, 2081	9:07:31	Total	24.6N 53.6E	0.3378	1.072	247	5m 33s	
136	42	September 14, 2099	16:57:53	Total	23.4N 62.8W	0.3942	1.0684	241	5m 18s	
136	43	September 26, 2117	0:55:42	Total	21.9N 178.4E	0.4442	1.0645	233	5m 3s	
136	44	October 7, 2135	9:00:03	Total	20.3N 57.6E	0.4884	1.0603	224	4m 50s	
136	45	October 17, 2153	17:12:18	Total	18.8N 65.7W	0.5259	1.056	214	4m 36s	
136	46	October 29, 2171	1:31:03	Total	17.6N 169.1E	0.5577	1.0516	203	4m 23s	
136	47	November 8, 2189	9:57:28	Total	16.5N 41.6E	0.583	1.0474	192	4m 10s	
136	48	November 20, 2207	18:30:26	Total	15.8N 87.8W	0.6027	1.0434	180	3m 56s	
136	49	December 1, 2225	3:08:36	Total	15.4N 141.4E	0.6178	1.0398	169	3m 43s	
136	50	December 12, 2243	11:52:14	Total	15.5N 9E	0.6284	1.0365	157	3m 30s	
136	51	December 22, 2261	20:38:50	Total	16.1N 124.2W	0.636	1.0337	147	3m 17s	
136	52	January 3, 2280	5:28:11	Total	17.2N 101.9E	0.6414	1.0314	138	3m 4s	
136	53	January 13, 2298	14:16:27	Total	19N 31.9W	0.6474	1.0296	131	2m 52s	
136	54	January 25, 2316	23:05:17	Total	21.4N 166W	0.6526	1.0282	126	2m 42s	
136	55	February 5, 2334	7:50:29	Total	24.6N 60.8E	0.6603	1.0272	122	2m 33s	
136	56	February 16, 2352	16:32:06	Total	28.5N 71.8W	0.6709	1.0266	121	2m 25s	
136	57	February 27, 2370	1:07:02	Total	33.2N 157E	0.6865	1.0262	121	2m 17s	
136	58	March 9, 2388	9:36:21	Total	38.5N 27E	0.7064	1.026	124	2m 10s	
136	59	March 20, 2406	17:57:23	Total	44.5N 101.3W	0.7327	1.0258	128	2m 3s	
136	60	March 31, 2424	2:10:10	Total	51.3N 131.9E	0.7652	1.0254	133	1m 55s	
136	61	April 11, 2442	10:14:04	Total	58.7N 6.2E	0.8046	1.0248	142	1m 45s	
136	62	April 21, 2460	18:09:49	Total	66.8N 119.8W	0.8503	1.0236	154	1m 34s	
136	63	May 3, 2478	1:55:59	Total	75.7N 107.7E	0.9034	1.0218	176	1m 20s	
136	64	May 13, 2496	9:34:25	Total	81N 70.4W	0.9622	1.0185	243	1m 2s	
136	65	May 25, 2514	17:04:32	Partial	68.5N 123.2E	1.0272	0.9507			
136	66	June 5, 2532	0:28:58	Partial	67.5N 1.3E	1.0962	0.8224			
136	67	June 16, 2550	7:45:35	Partial	66.4N 118.1W	1.1708	0.684			
136	68	June 26, 2568	14:58:55	Partial	65.5N 123.7E	1.2472	0.5426			
136	69	July 7, 2586	22:07:07	Partial	64.5N 7.2E	1.327	0.3957			
136	70	July 19, 2604	5:14:31	Partial	63.7N 108.8W	1.4062	0.2509			
136	71	July 30, 2622	12:18:09	Partial	63N 136.4E	1.4872	0.1039			
