= March 1914 lunar eclipse =

Partial lunar eclipse in 1914

- Partial eclipse
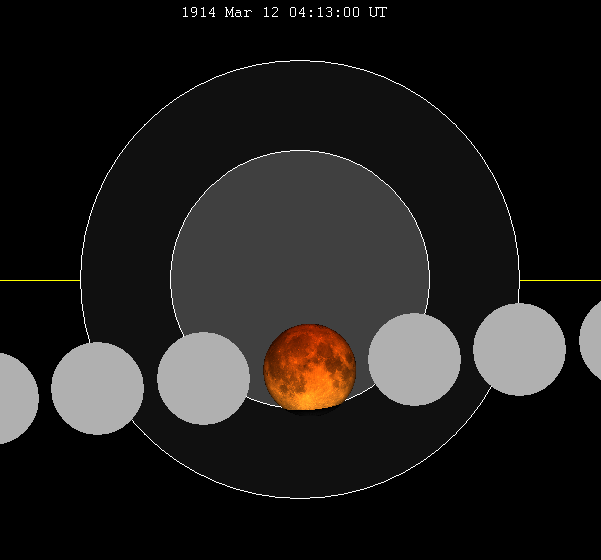
- The Moon's hourly motion shown right to left
- Date: March 12, 1914
- Gamma: −0.5254
- Magnitude: 0.9111
- Saros cycle: 131 (28 of 72)
- Partiality: 181 minutes, 29 seconds
- Penumbral: 301 minutes, 28 seconds
Contacts (UTC)
- P1: 1:42:08
- U1: 2:42:08
- Greatest: 4:12:52
- U4: 5:42:37
- P4: 6:43:36

A partial lunar eclipse occurred at the Moon's ascending node of orbit on Thursday, March 12, 1914, with an umbral magnitude of 0.9111. A lunar eclipse occurs when the Moon moves into the Earth's shadow, causing the Moon to be darkened. A partial lunar eclipse occurs when one part of the Moon is in the Earth's umbra, while the other part is in the Earth's penumbra. Unlike a solar eclipse, which can only be viewed from a relatively small area of the world, a lunar eclipse may be viewed from anywhere on the night side of Earth. Occurring only about 18 hours before perigee (on March 12, 1914, at 22:20 UTC), the Moon's apparent diameter was larger.

== Visibility ==
The eclipse was completely visible over North America, South America, and west Africa, seen rising over northwestern North America and the central Pacific Ocean and setting over much of Africa, Europe, and west and central Asia.

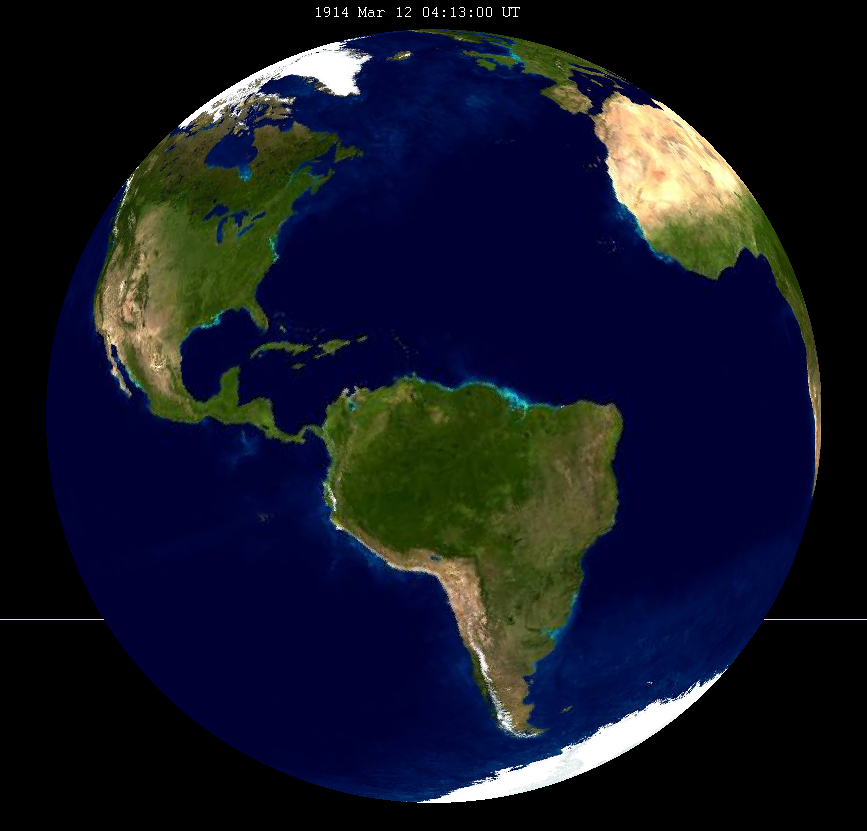
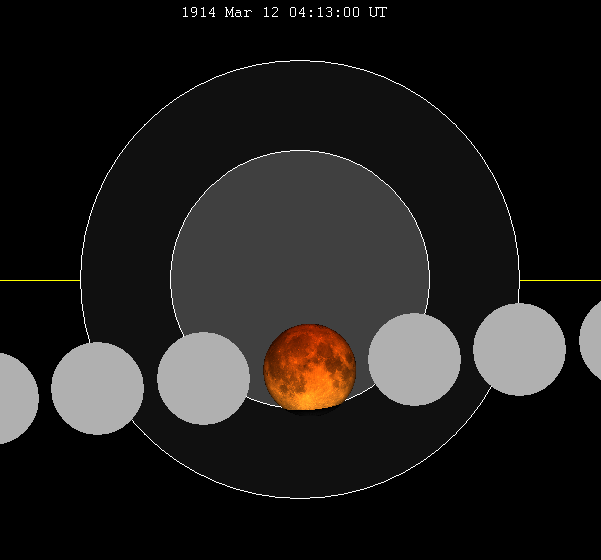

== Eclipse details ==
Shown below is a table displaying details about this particular lunar eclipse. It describes various parameters pertaining to this eclipse.

March 12, 1914 Lunar Eclipse Parameters
Parameter	Value
Penumbral Magnitude	1.87639
Umbral Magnitude	0.91108
Gamma	−0.52543
Sun Right Ascension	23h26m01.9s
Sun Declination	-03°39'56.2"
Sun Semi-Diameter	16'05.6"
Sun Equatorial Horizontal Parallax	08.8"
Moon Right Ascension	11h24m59.9s
Moon Declination	+03°11'46.2"
Moon Semi-Diameter	16'40.3"
Moon Equatorial Horizontal Parallax	1°01'11.2"
ΔT	16.0 s

== Eclipse season ==
This eclipse is part of an eclipse season, a period, roughly every six months, when eclipses occur. Only two (or occasionally three) eclipse seasons occur each year, and each season lasts about 35 days and repeats just short of six months (173 days) later; thus two full eclipse seasons always occur each year. Either two or three eclipses happen each eclipse season. In the sequence below, each eclipse is separated by a fortnight.

Eclipse season of February–March 1914
February 25 Ascending node (new moon)	March 12 Descending node (full moon)
Annular solar eclipse Solar Saros 119	Partial lunar eclipse Lunar Saros 131

== Related eclipses ==
=== Eclipses in 1914 ===
- An annular solar eclipse on February 25.
- A partial lunar eclipse on March 12.
- A total solar eclipse on August 21.
- A partial lunar eclipse on September 4.

=== Metonic ===
- Preceded by: Lunar eclipse of May 24, 1910
- Followed by: Lunar eclipse of December 28, 1917

=== Tzolkinex ===
- Preceded by: Lunar eclipse of January 29, 1907
- Followed by: Lunar eclipse of April 22, 1921

=== Half-Saros ===
- Preceded by: Solar eclipse of March 6, 1905
- Followed by: Solar eclipse of March 17, 1923

=== Tritos ===
- Preceded by: Lunar eclipse of April 12, 1903
- Followed by: Lunar eclipse of February 8, 1925

=== Lunar Saros 131 ===
- Preceded by: Lunar eclipse of February 28, 1896
- Followed by: Lunar eclipse of March 22, 1932

=== Inex ===
- Preceded by: Lunar eclipse of March 30, 1885
- Followed by: Lunar eclipse of February 20, 1943

=== Triad ===
- Preceded by: Lunar eclipse of May 11, 1827
- Followed by: Lunar eclipse of January 9, 2001

=== Lunar eclipses of 1912–1915 ===
This eclipse is a member of a semester series. An eclipse in a semester series of lunar eclipses repeats approximately every 177 days and 4 hours (a semester) at alternating nodes of the Moon's orbit.

The penumbral lunar eclipses on January 31, 1915 and July 26, 1915 occur in the next lunar year eclipse set.

Lunar eclipse series sets from 1912 to 1915
Descending node				Ascending node			
Saros	Date Viewing	Type Chart	Gamma	Saros	Date Viewing	Type Chart	Gamma
111	1912 Apr 01	Partial	0.9116	116	1912 Sep 26	Partial	−0.9320
121	1913 Mar 22	Total	0.1671	126	1913 Sep 15	Total	−0.2109
131	1914 Mar 12	Partial	−0.5254	136	1914 Sep 04	Partial	0.5301
141	1915 Mar 01	Penumbral	−1.2573	146	1915 Aug 24	Penumbral	1.2435

=== Saros 131 ===
This eclipse is a part of Saros series 131, repeating every 18 years, 11 days, and containing 72 events. The series started with a penumbral lunar eclipse on May 10, 1427. It contains partial eclipses from July 25, 1553 through March 22, 1932; total eclipses from April 2, 1950 through September 3, 2202; and a second set of partial eclipses from September 13, 2220 through April 9, 2563. The series ends at member 72 as a penumbral eclipse on July 7, 2707.

The longest duration of totality will be produced by member 38 at 100 minutes, 36 seconds on June 28, 2094. All eclipses in this series occur at the Moon’s descending node of orbit.

Greatest	First			
The greatest eclipse of the series will occur on 2094 Jun 28, lasting 100 minutes, 36 seconds.	Penumbral	Partial	Total	Central
The greatest eclipse of the series will occur on 2094 Jun 28, lasting 100 minutes, 36 seconds.	1427 May 10	1553 Jul 25	1950 Apr 02	2022 May 16
The greatest eclipse of the series will occur on 2094 Jun 28, lasting 100 minutes, 36 seconds.	Last			
The greatest eclipse of the series will occur on 2094 Jun 28, lasting 100 minutes, 36 seconds.	Central	Total	Partial	Penumbral
The greatest eclipse of the series will occur on 2094 Jun 28, lasting 100 minutes, 36 seconds.	2148 Jul 31	2202 Sep 03	2563 Apr 09	2707 Jul 07

Eclipses are tabulated in three columns; every third eclipse in the same column is one exeligmos apart, so they all cast shadows over approximately the same parts of the Earth.

Series members 22–43 occur between 1801 and 2200:
22	23	24
1806 Jan 05	1824 Jan 16	1842 Jan 26
25	26	27
1860 Feb 07	1878 Feb 17	1896 Feb 28
28	29	30
1914 Mar 12	1932 Mar 22	1950 Apr 02
31	32	33
1968 Apr 13	1986 Apr 24	2004 May 04
34	35	36
2022 May 16	2040 May 26	2058 Jun 06
37	38	39
2076 Jun 17	2094 Jun 28	2112 Jul 09
40	41	42
2130 Jul 21	2148 Jul 31	2166 Aug 11
43
2184 Aug 21

=== Tritos series ===
This eclipse is a part of a tritos cycle, repeating at alternating nodes every 135 synodic months (≈ 3986.63 days, or 11 years minus 1 month). Their appearance and longitude are irregular due to a lack of synchronization with the anomalistic month (period of perigee), but groupings of 3 tritos cycles (≈ 33 years minus 3 months) come close (≈ 434.044 anomalistic months), so eclipses are similar in these groupings.

Series members between 1801 and 2187
1805 Jan 15 (Saros 121)	1815 Dec 16 (Saros 122)	1826 Nov 14 (Saros 123)	1837 Oct 13 (Saros 124)	1848 Sep 13 (Saros 125)
1859 Aug 13 (Saros 126)	1870 Jul 12 (Saros 127)	1881 Jun 12 (Saros 128)	1892 May 11 (Saros 129)	1903 Apr 12 (Saros 130)
1914 Mar 12 (Saros 131)	1925 Feb 08 (Saros 132)	1936 Jan 08 (Saros 133)	1946 Dec 08 (Saros 134)	1957 Nov 07 (Saros 135)
1968 Oct 06 (Saros 136)	1979 Sep 06 (Saros 137)	1990 Aug 06 (Saros 138)	2001 Jul 05 (Saros 139)	2012 Jun 04 (Saros 140)
2023 May 05 (Saros 141)	2034 Apr 03 (Saros 142)	2045 Mar 03 (Saros 143)	2056 Feb 01 (Saros 144)	2066 Dec 31 (Saros 145)
2077 Nov 29 (Saros 146)	2088 Oct 30 (Saros 147)	2099 Sep 29 (Saros 148)	2110 Aug 29 (Saros 149)	2121 Jul 30 (Saros 150)
2132 Jun 28 (Saros 151)	2143 May 28 (Saros 152)	2154 Apr 28 (Saros 153)		
2187 Jan 24 (Saros 156)

=== Inex series ===
This eclipse is a part of the long period inex cycle, repeating at alternating nodes, every 358 synodic months (≈ 10,571.95 days, or 29 years minus 20 days). Their appearance and longitude are irregular due to a lack of synchronization with the anomalistic month (period of perigee). However, groupings of 3 inex cycles (≈ 87 years minus 2 months) comes close (≈ 1,151.02 anomalistic months), so eclipses are similar in these groupings.

Series members between 1801 and 2200
1827 May 11 (Saros 128)	1856 Apr 20 (Saros 129)	1885 Mar 30 (Saros 130)
1914 Mar 12 (Saros 131)	1943 Feb 20 (Saros 132)	1972 Jan 30 (Saros 133)
2001 Jan 09 (Saros 134)	2029 Dec 20 (Saros 135)	2058 Nov 30 (Saros 136)
2087 Nov 10 (Saros 137)	2116 Oct 21 (Saros 138)	2145 Sep 30 (Saros 139)
2174 Sep 11 (Saros 140)

=== Half-Saros cycle ===
A lunar eclipse will be preceded and followed by solar eclipses by 9 years and 5.5 days (a half saros). This lunar eclipse is related to two annular solar eclipses of Solar Saros 138.

March 6, 1905	March 17, 1923

== See also ==
- List of lunar eclipses
- List of 20th-century lunar eclipses
