= NGC 6642 =

Globular cluster in the constellation Sagittarius

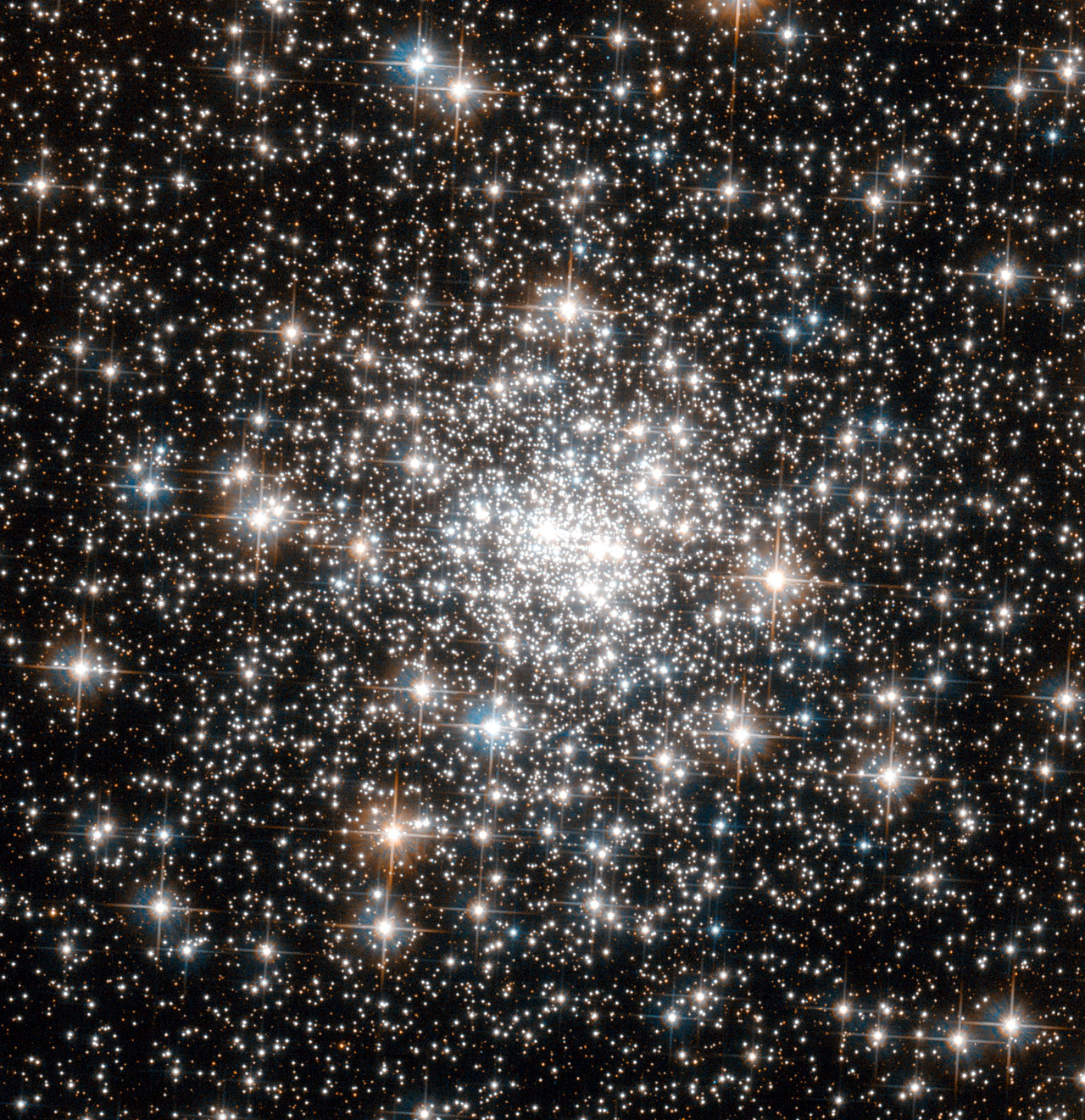
- Image of NGC 6642 was created from visible and infrared images taken with the Wide Field Channel of the Advanced Camera for Surveys.

Observation data (J2000 epoch)
- Class: V?
- Constellation: Sagittarius
- Right ascension: 18^{h} 31^{m} 54.23^{s}
- Declination: −23° 28′ 34.1″
- Distance: 26.7 ± 2.3 kly (8.2 ± 0.7 kpc)
- Apparent dimensions (V): 48"

Physical characteristics
- Mass: 1.09×10^{5} M_{☉}
- Metallicity: [Fe/H] = –1.26 dex
- Other designations: Cr 381, C 1828-235, ESO 522-32, GCl 97, Mel 203

NGC 6642 is a globular cluster located 26,700 light-years from Earth, in the constellation Sagittarius. Many "blue stragglers" (stars which seemingly lag behind in their rate of aging) have been spotted in this globular, and it is known to be lacking in low-mass stars.

During the June 2094 lunar eclipse, a total lunar eclipse, it will be occulted by the Moon over New Guinea, Northern Australia and the Pacific Ocean.
