= Lunar Saros 131 =

Eclipse cycle of the moon

Member 33	Member 34
2004 May 04	2022 May 16

Saros cycle series 131 for lunar eclipses occurs at the moon's descending node, repeats every 18 years 11 and 1/3 days. It contains 72 member events, with 15 total eclipses, starting in 1950 and ending in 2202.

The series contains 57 umbral eclipses between 1553 and 2563 (total eclipses between 1950 and 2202).

== List ==
Cat.	Saros	Mem	Date	Time UT (hr:mn)	Type	Gamma	Magnitude	Duration (min)			Contacts UT (hr:mn)						Chart
Cat.	Saros	Mem	Date	Greatest	Type	Gamma	Magnitude	Pen.	Par.	Tot.	P1	P4	U1	U2	U3	U4	Chart
08268	131	1	1427 May 10	23:39:25	Penumbral	-1.5427	-0.9572	29.1			23:24:52	23:53:58					
08310	131	2	1445 May 21	7:02:27	Penumbral	-1.4705	-0.8227	101.9			6:11:30	7:53:24					
08351	131	3	1463 Jun 01	14:23:22	Penumbral	-1.3957	-0.6837	140.3			13:13:13	15:33:31					
08391	131	4	1481 Jun 11	21:44:03	Penumbral	-1.3201	-0.5435	168.9			20:19:36	23:08:30					
08431	131	5	1499 Jun 23	5:05:35	Penumbral	-1.2445	-0.4037	191.8			3:29:41	6:41:29					
08471	131	6	1517 Jul 03	12:28:24	Penumbral	-1.1693	-0.2648	210.9			10:42:57	14:13:51					
08512	131	7	1535 Jul 14	19:54:01	Penumbral	-1.0956	-0.1292	226.9			18:00:34	21:47:28					
08554	131	8	1553 Jul 25	3:24:11	Partial	-1.0253	0.0001	240.2	2.5		1:24:05	5:24:17	3:22:56			3:25:26	
08597	131	9	1571 Aug 05	10:59:42	Partial	-0.9591	0.1215	251.3	75.3		8:54:03	13:05:21	10:22:03			11:37:21	
08640	131	10	1589 Aug 25	18:40:24	Partial	-0.8969	0.2352	260.7	102.9		16:30:03	20:50:45	17:48:57			19:31:51	
08683	131	11	1607 Sep 06	2:28:42	Partial	-0.8407	0.3378	268.3	121.3		0:14:33	4:42:51	1:28:03			3:29:21	
08728	131	12	1625 Sep 16	10:24:16	Partial	-0.7904	0.4295	274.6	134.8		8:06:58	12:41:34	9:16:52			11:31:40	
08772	131	13	1643 Sep 27	18:28:14	Partial	-0.7468	0.5085	279.6	144.7		16:08:26	20:48:02	17:15:53			19:40:35	
08817	131	14	1661 Oct 08	2:39:03	Partial	-0.7089	0.5771	283.7	152.4		0:17:12	5:00:54	1:22:51			3:55:15	
08862	131	15	1679 Oct 19	10:58:53	Partial	-0.6784	0.6321	286.9	158.0		8:35:26	13:22:20	9:39:53			12:17:53	
08908	131	16	1697 Oct 29	19:25:59	Partial	-0.6537	0.6764	289.3	162.1		17:01:20	21:50:38	18:04:56			20:47:02	
08954	131	17	1715 Nov 11	4:00:14	Partial	-0.6347	0.7102	291.1	165.1		1:34:41	6:25:47	2:37:41			5:22:47	
09001	131	18	1733 Nov 21	12:40:54	Partial	-0.6211	0.7344	292.5	167.2		10:14:39	15:07:09	11:17:18			14:04:30	
09048	131	19	1751 Dec 02	21:26:52	Partial	-0.6116	0.7512	293.4	168.5		19:00:10	23:53:34	20:02:37			22:51:07	
09095	131	20	1769 Dec 13	6:17:04	Partial	-0.6058	0.7611	294.0	169.4		3:50:04	8:44:04	4:52:22			7:41:46	
09140	131	21	1787 Dec 24	15:08:29	Partial	-0.6010	0.7696	294.5	170.1		12:41:14	17:35:44	13:43:26			16:33:32	
09185	131	22	1806 Jan 05	0:02:04	Partial	-0.5981	0.7748	294.8	170.5		21:34:40	2:29:28	22:36:49			1:27:19	
09230	131	23	1824 Jan 16	8:54:09	Partial	-0.5937	0.7829	295.3	171.2		6:26:30	11:21:48	7:28:33			10:19:45	
09276	131	24	1842 Jan 26	17:44:27	Partial	-0.5884	0.7930	295.9	172.1		15:16:30	20:12:24	16:18:24			19:10:30	
09321	131	25	1860 Feb 07	2:29:45	Partial	-0.5790	0.8106	296.8	173.7		0:01:21	4:58:09	1:02:54			3:56:36	
09365	131	26	1878 Feb 17	11:11:05	Partial	-0.5667	0.8338	297.9	175.6		8:42:08	13:40:02	9:43:17			12:38:53	
09409	131	27	1896 Feb 28	19:45:40	Partial	-0.5488	0.8673	299.5	178.2		17:15:55	22:15:25	18:16:34			21:14:46	
09451	131	28	1914 Mar 12	4:13:08	Partial	-0.5254	0.9111	301.5	181.5		1:42:23	6:43:53	2:42:23			5:43:53	
09493	131	29	1932 Mar 22	12:32:39	Partial	-0.4956	0.9666	303.8	185.3		10:00:45	15:04:33	11:00:00			14:05:18	
09535	131	30	1950 Apr 02	20:44:34	Total	-0.4598	1.0329	306.5	189.6	26.9	18:11:19	23:17:49	19:09:46	20:31:07	20:58:01	22:19:22	
09576	131	31	1968 Apr 13	4:48:01	Total	-0.4173	1.1116	309.5	194.1	48.5	2:13:16	7:22:46	3:10:58	4:23:46	5:12:16	6:25:04	
09618	131	32	1986 Apr 24	12:43:30	Total	-0.3682	1.2022	312.6	198.8	63.6	10:07:12	15:19:48	11:04:06	12:11:42	13:15:18	14:22:54	
09659	131	33	2004 May 04	20:31:17	Total	-0.3132	1.3035	315.7	203.2	75.5	17:53:26	23:09:08	18:49:41	19:53:32	21:09:02	22:12:53	
09700	131	34	2022 May 16	4:12:42	Total	-0.2532	1.4137	318.7	207.2	84.9	1:33:21	6:52:03	2:29:06	3:30:15	4:55:09	5:56:18	
09741	131	35	2040 May 26	11:46:22	Total	-0.1872	1.5348	321.4	210.7	92.2	9:05:40	14:27:04	10:01:01	11:00:16	12:32:28	13:31:43	
09781	131	36	2058 Jun 06	19:15:48	Total	-0.1181	1.6611	323.6	213.4	97.3	16:34:00	21:57:36	17:29:06	18:27:09	20:04:27	21:02:30	
09822	131	37	2076 Jun 17	2:39:47	Total	-0.0452	1.7943	325.3	215.1	100.2	23:57:08	5:22:26	0:52:14	1:49:41	3:29:53	4:27:20	
09863	131	38	2094 Jun 28	10:01:57	Total	0.0288	1.8234	326.5	215.7	100.6	7:18:42	12:45:12	8:14:06	9:11:39	10:52:15	11:49:48	
09905	131	39	2112 Jul 09	17:19:51	Total	0.1055	1.6814	326.9	215.1	98.4	14:36:24	20:03:18	15:32:18	16:30:39	18:09:03	19:07:24	
09947	131	40	2130 Jul 21	0:38:56	Total	0.1803	1.5426	326.6	213.4	93.5	21:55:38	3:22:14	22:52:14	23:52:11	1:25:41	2:25:38	
09991	131	41	2148 Jul 31	7:56:37	Total	0.2554	1.4030	325.7	210.4	85.3	5:13:46	10:39:28	6:11:25	7:13:58	8:39:16	9:41:49	
10035	131	42	2166 Aug 11	15:17:07	Total	0.3273	1.2688	324.1	206.3	73.3	12:35:04	17:59:10	13:33:58	14:40:28	15:53:46	17:00:16	
10078	131	43	2184 Aug 21	22:38:35	Total	0.3977	1.1374	321.9	201.0	54.8	19:57:38	1:19:32	20:58:05	22:11:11	23:05:59	0:19:05	
10121	131	44	2202 Sep 03	6:05:57	Total	0.4622	1.0163	319.5	194.9	19.6	3:26:12	8:45:42	4:28:30	5:56:09	6:15:45	7:43:24	
10165	131	45	2220 Sep 13	13:36:52	Partial	0.5228	0.9023	316.6	188.0		10:58:34	16:15:10	12:02:52			15:10:52	
10210	131	46	2238 Sep 24	21:14:02	Partial	0.5775	0.7992	313.7	180.6		18:37:11	23:50:53	19:43:44			22:44:20	
10255	131	47	2256 Oct 05	4:57:13	Partial	0.6264	0.7064	310.9	173.0		2:21:46	7:32:40	3:30:43			6:23:43	
10301	131	48	2274 Oct 16	12:48:09	Partial	0.6683	0.6264	308.3	165.5		10:14:00	15:22:18	11:25:24			14:10:54	
10348	131	49	2292 Oct 26	20:45:26	Partial	0.7041	0.5577	306.0	158.3		18:12:26	23:18:26	19:26:17			22:04:35	
10394	131	50	2310 Nov 08	4:49:17	Partial	0.7339	0.5001	304.2	151.8		2:17:11	7:21:23	3:33:23			6:05:11	
10440	131	51	2328 Nov 18	12:59:37	Partial	0.7574	0.4541	302.9	146.1		10:28:10	15:31:04	11:46:34			14:12:40	
10486	131	52	2346 Nov 29	21:15:59	Partial	0.7756	0.4180	302.1	141.3		18:44:56	23:47:02	20:05:20			22:26:38	
10531	131	53	2364 Dec 10	5:36:17	Partial	0.7898	0.3895	301.8	137.4		3:05:23	8:07:11	4:27:35			6:44:59	
10576	131	54	2382 Dec 21	14:00:40	Partial	0.8002	0.3684	301.8	134.4		11:29:46	16:31:34	12:53:28			15:07:52	
10621	131	55	2400 Dec 31	22:26:34	Partial	0.8085	0.3512	301.9	132.0		19:55:37	0:57:31	21:20:34			23:32:34	
10666	131	56	2419 Jan 12	6:53:23	Partial	0.8154	0.3369	302.2	129.9		4:22:17	9:24:29	5:48:26			7:58:20	
10710	131	57	2437 Jan 22	15:17:33	Partial	0.8239	0.3201	302.2	127.3		12:46:27	17:48:39	14:13:54			16:21:12	
10754	131	58	2455 Feb 02	23:40:14	Partial	0.8331	0.3023	302.0	124.4		21:09:14	2:11:14	22:38:02			0:42:26	
10796	131	59	2473 Feb 13	7:57:35	Partial	0.8462	0.2776	301.1	120.0		5:27:02	10:28:08	6:57:35			8:57:35	
10837	131	60	2491 Feb 24	16:09:26	Partial	0.8630	0.2463	299.6	113.8		13:39:38	18:39:14	15:12:32			17:06:20	
10878	131	61	2509 Mar 08	0:13:07	Partial	0.8858	0.2042	297.0	104.6		21:44:37	2:41:37	23:20:49			1:05:25	
10918	131	62	2527 Mar 19	8:09:29	Partial	0.9140	0.1524	293.3	91.3		5:42:50	10:36:08	7:23:50			8:55:08	
10959	131	63	2545 Mar 29	15:56:33	Partial	0.9493	0.0878	288.1	70.1		13:32:30	18:20:36	15:21:30			16:31:36	
11001	131	64	2563 Apr 09	23:33:33	Partial	0.9919	0.0097	281.2	23.7		21:12:57	1:54:09	23:21:42			23:45:24	
11042	131	65	2581 Apr 20	7:01:04	Penumbral	1.0414	-0.0809	272.2			4:44:58	9:17:10					
11082	131	66	2599 May 1	14:18:45	Penumbral	1.0978	-0.1843	260.8			12:08:21	16:29:09					
11122	131	67	2617 May 12	21:27:24	Penumbral	1.1607	-0.2996	246.3			19:24:15	23:30:33					
11161	131	68	2635 May 24	4:26:35	Penumbral	1.2304	-0.4273	228.0			2:32:35	6:20:35					
11202	131	69	2653 Jun 03	11:18:15	Penumbral	1.3049	-0.5641	204.8			9:35:51	13:00:39					
11244	131	70	2671 Jun 14	18:03:01	Penumbral	1.3835	-0.7088	175.0			16:35:31	19:30:31					
11287	131	71	2689 Jun 25	0:41:31	Penumbral	1.4660	-0.8606	133.8			23:34:37	1:48:25					
11330	131	72	2707 Jul 07	7:16:15	Penumbral	1.5504	-1.0160	63.4			6:44:33	7:47:57					

== See also ==
- List of lunar eclipses
  - List of Saros series for lunar eclipses
