= May 2022 lunar eclipse =

Total lunar eclipse of 15–16 May 2022

- Total eclipse
- Totality as viewed from Irvine, California, 4:44 UTC
- Date: May 16, 2022
- Gamma: −0.2532
- Magnitude: 1.4155
- Saros cycle: 131 (34 of 72)
- Totality: 85 minutes, 32 seconds
- Partiality: 207 minutes, 57 seconds
- Penumbral: 319 minutes, 28 seconds
Contacts (UTC)
- P1: 01:31:45
- U1: 02:27:32
- U2: 03:28:41
- Greatest: 04:11:33
- U3: 04:54:13
- U4: 05:55:29
- P4: 06:51:13

A total lunar eclipse occurred at the Moon’s descending node of orbit on Monday, May 16, 2022, with an umbral magnitude of 1.4155. It was a central lunar eclipse, in which part of the Moon passed through the center of the Earth's shadow. A lunar eclipse occurs when the Moon moves into the Earth's shadow, causing the Moon to be darkened. A total lunar eclipse occurs when the Moon's near side entirely passes into the Earth's umbral shadow. Unlike a solar eclipse, which can only be viewed from a relatively small area of the world, a lunar eclipse may be viewed from anywhere on the night side of Earth. A total lunar eclipse can last up to nearly two hours, while a total solar eclipse lasts only a few minutes at any given place, because the Moon's shadow is smaller. Occurring about 1.5 days before perigee (15:23 UTC, May 17), the Moon's apparent diameter was larger than average.

Because this event occurred near lunar perigee, it was referred in media coverage as a "super flower blood moon" (Note: A full moon occurring in May has been termed a "Flower moon" in the US as recorded in the Old Farmer's Almanac.) and elsewhere as a "super blood moon": a supermoon that coincides with a total lunar eclipse. This was the longest total lunar eclipse visible from nearly all of North America since August 17, 1989 until the next eclipse on November 8.

The eclipse was a dark one with the northern limb of the Moon passing through the center of Earth's shadow. This was the first central eclipse of Lunar Saros 131.

This lunar eclipse was the third of an almost tetrad, with the others being on May 26, 2021 (total); November 19, 2021 (partial); and November 8, 2022 (total).

== Visibility ==
The eclipse was completely visible over North and South America, seen rising over western North America and the central Pacific Ocean and setting over Europe and Africa.

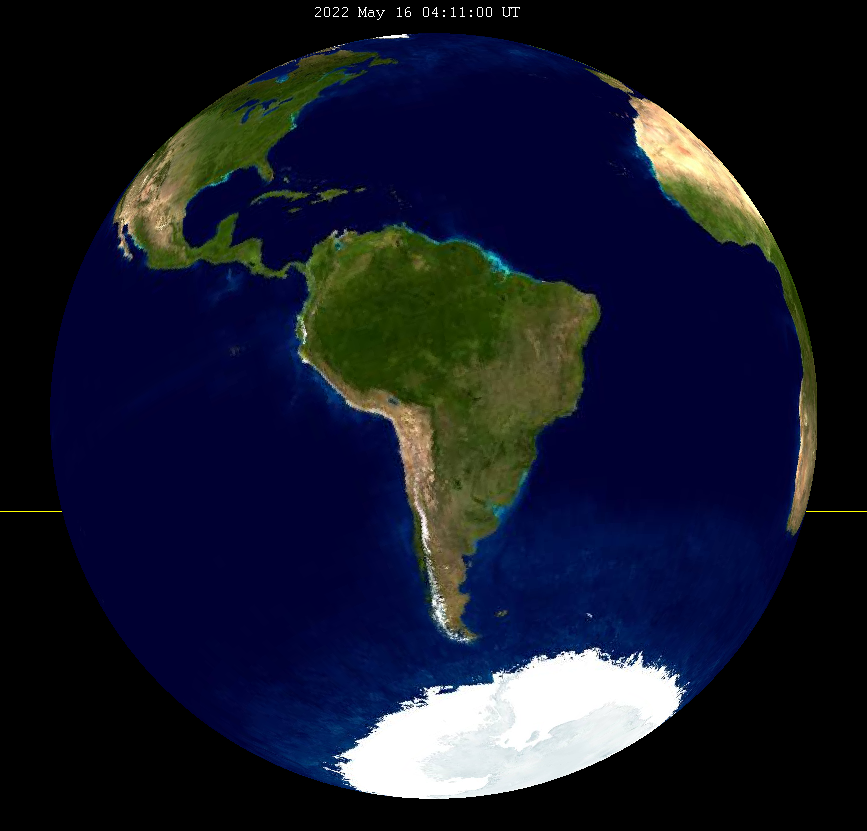
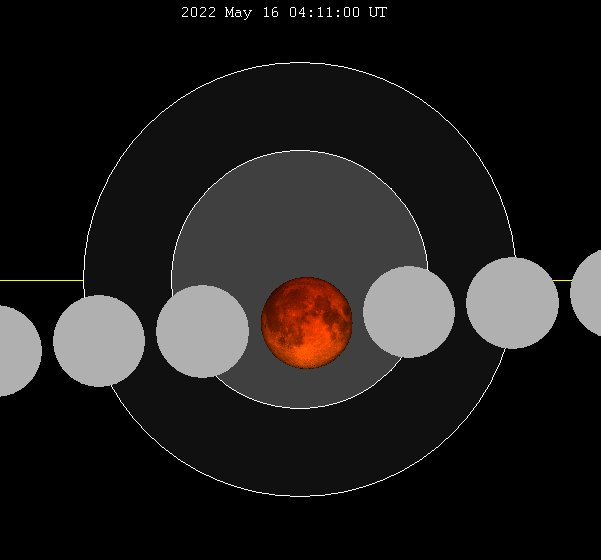
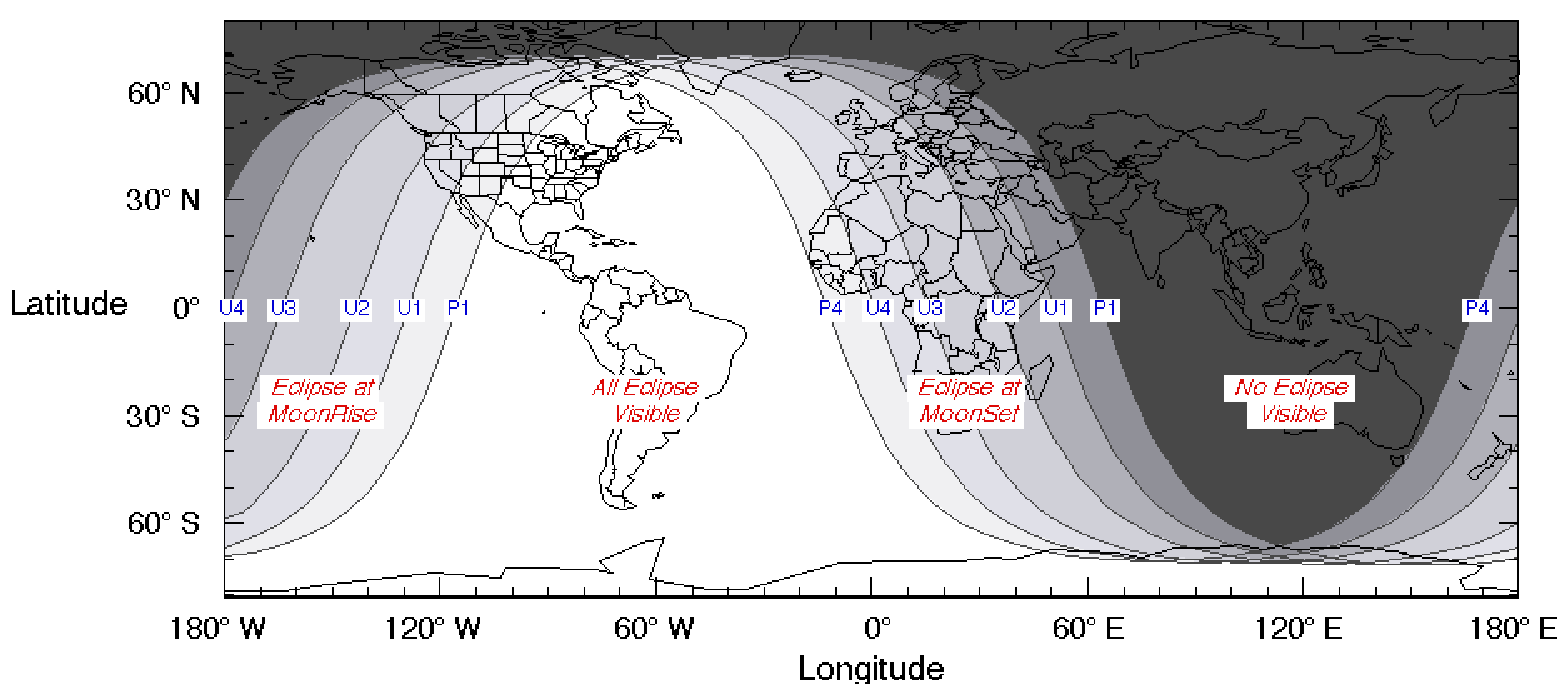
Visibility map

== Gallery ==
=== North and South America ===
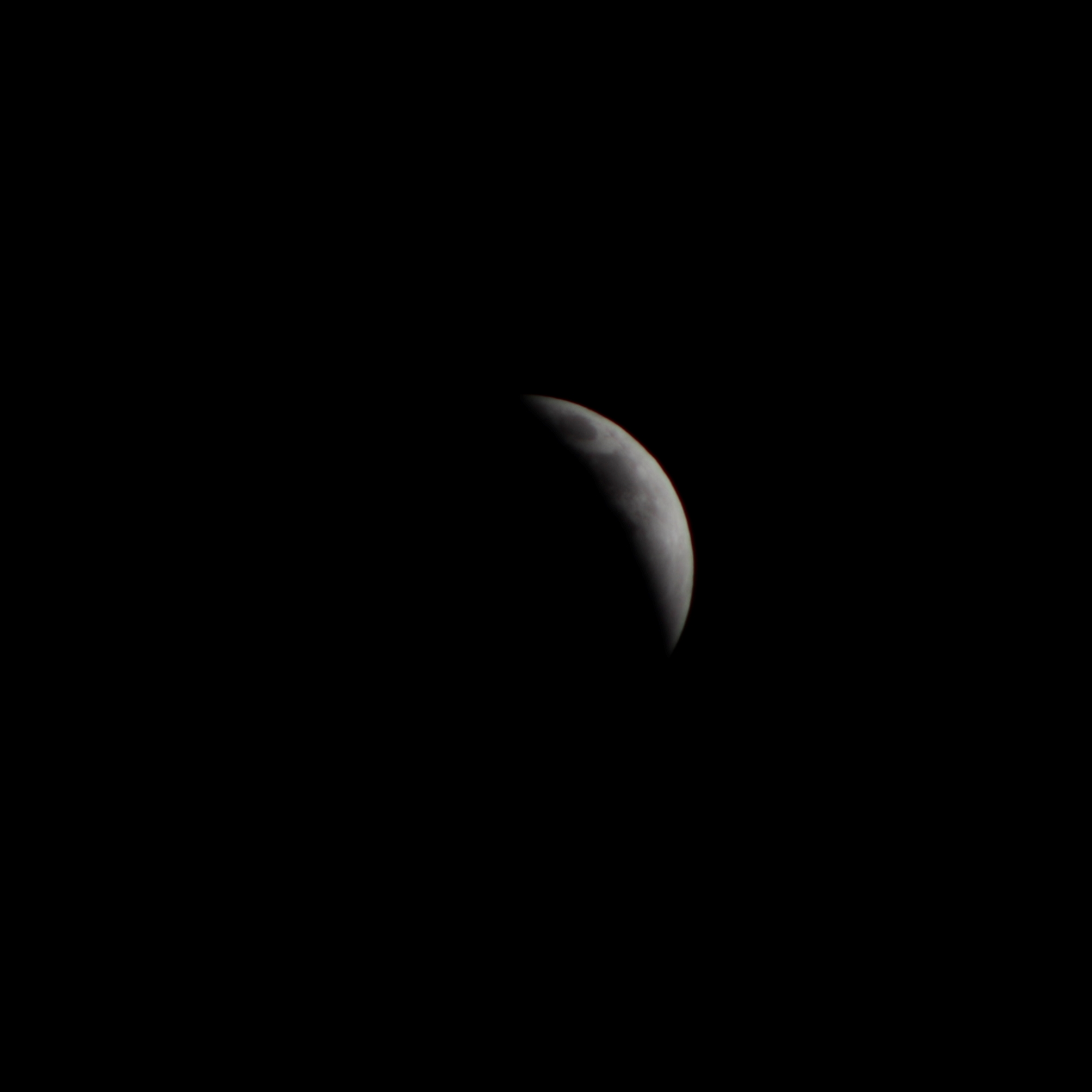
Partial from Spring Hill, Florida, 2:42 UTC

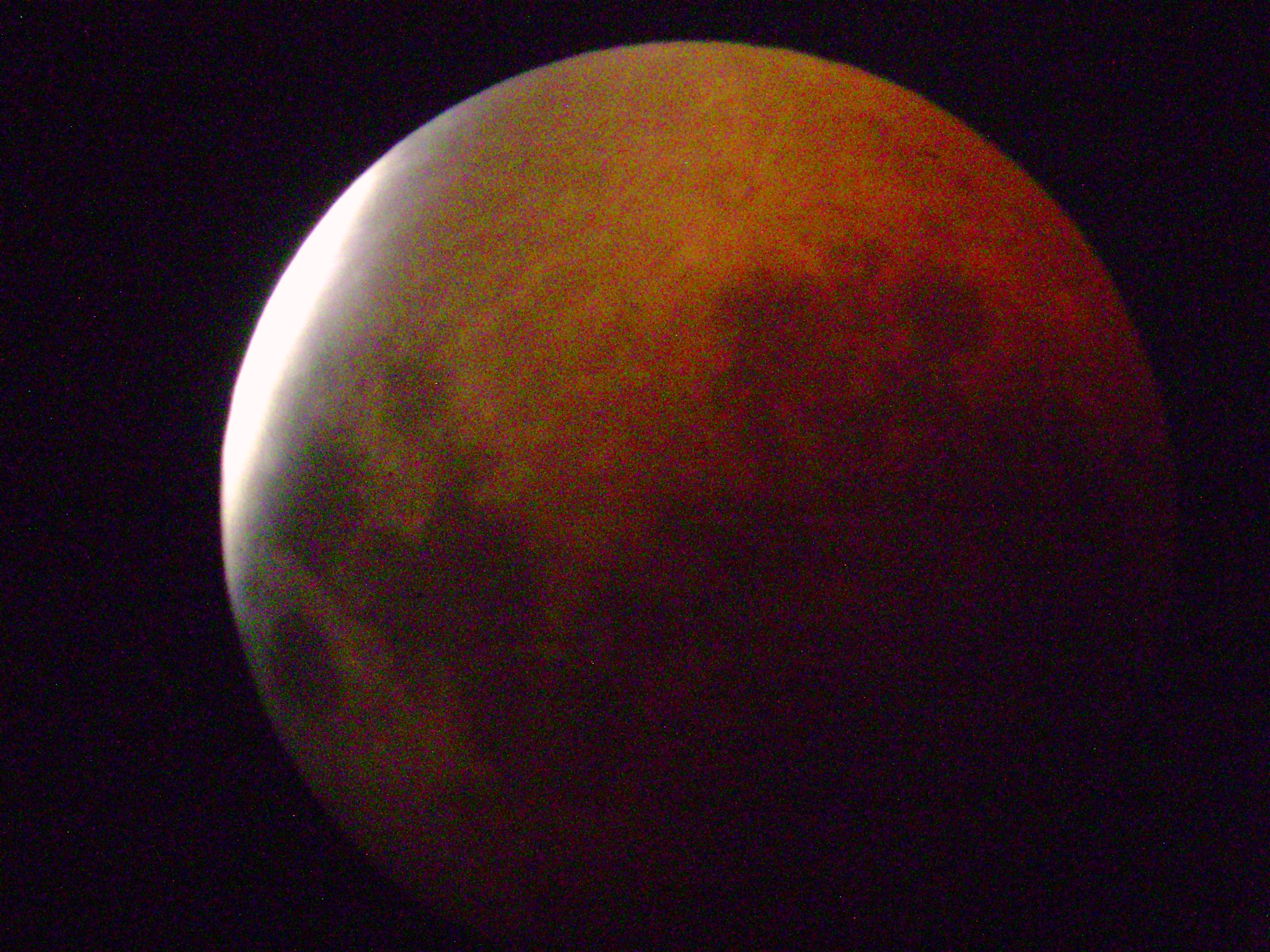
Buenos Aires, Argentina, 3:26 UTC

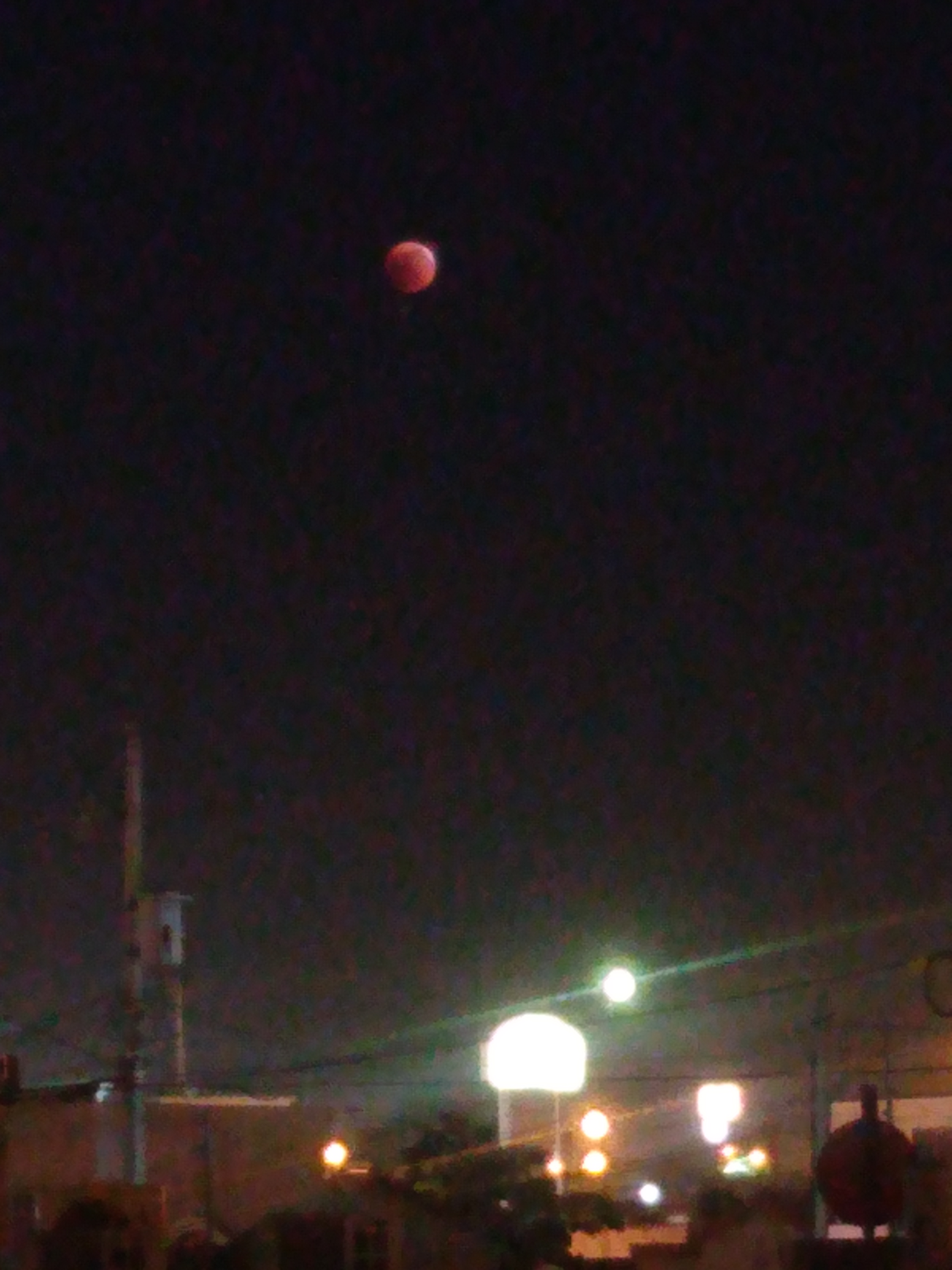
Mexicali, Mexico, 3:28 UTC

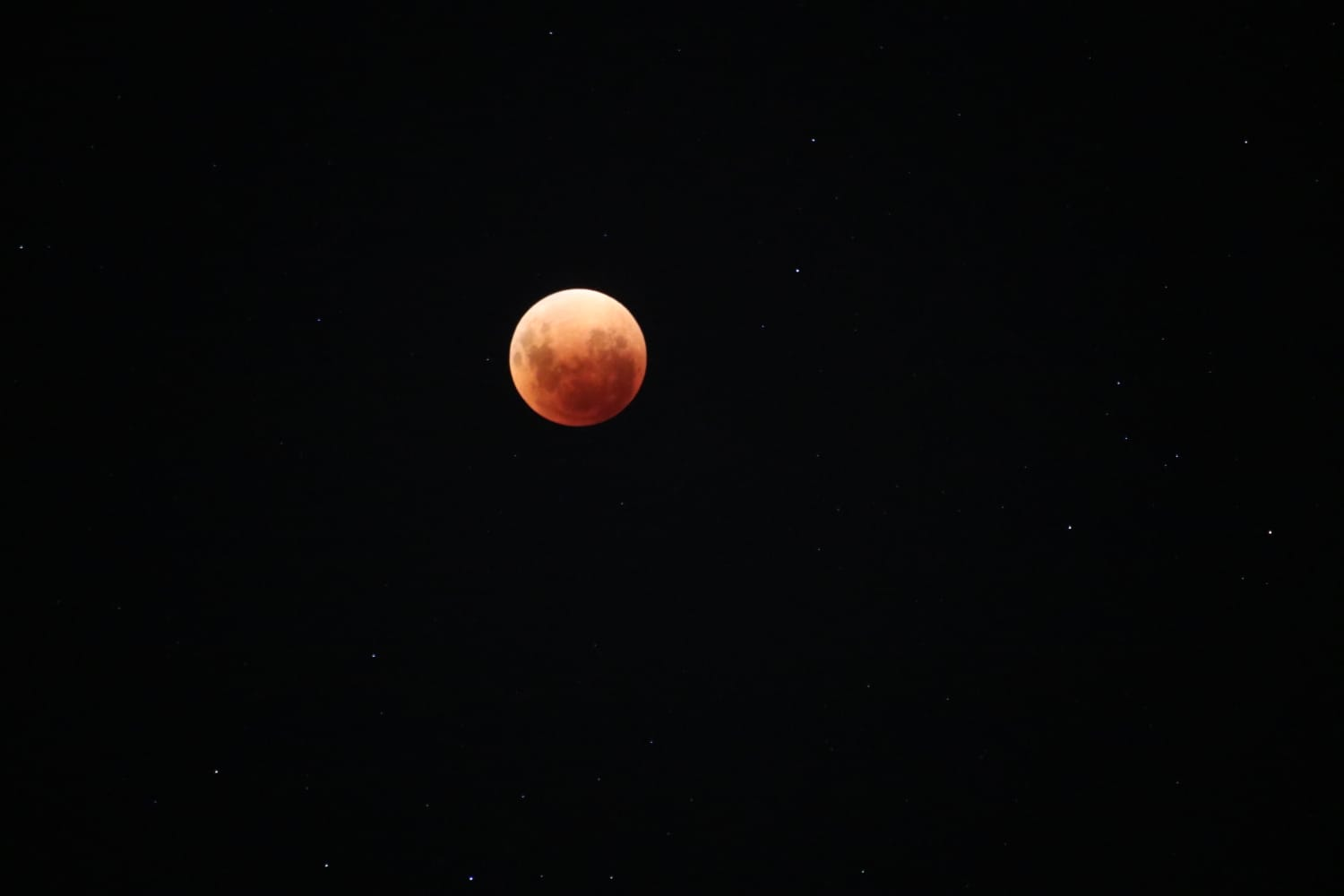
Quillón, Chile, ~3:30 UTC

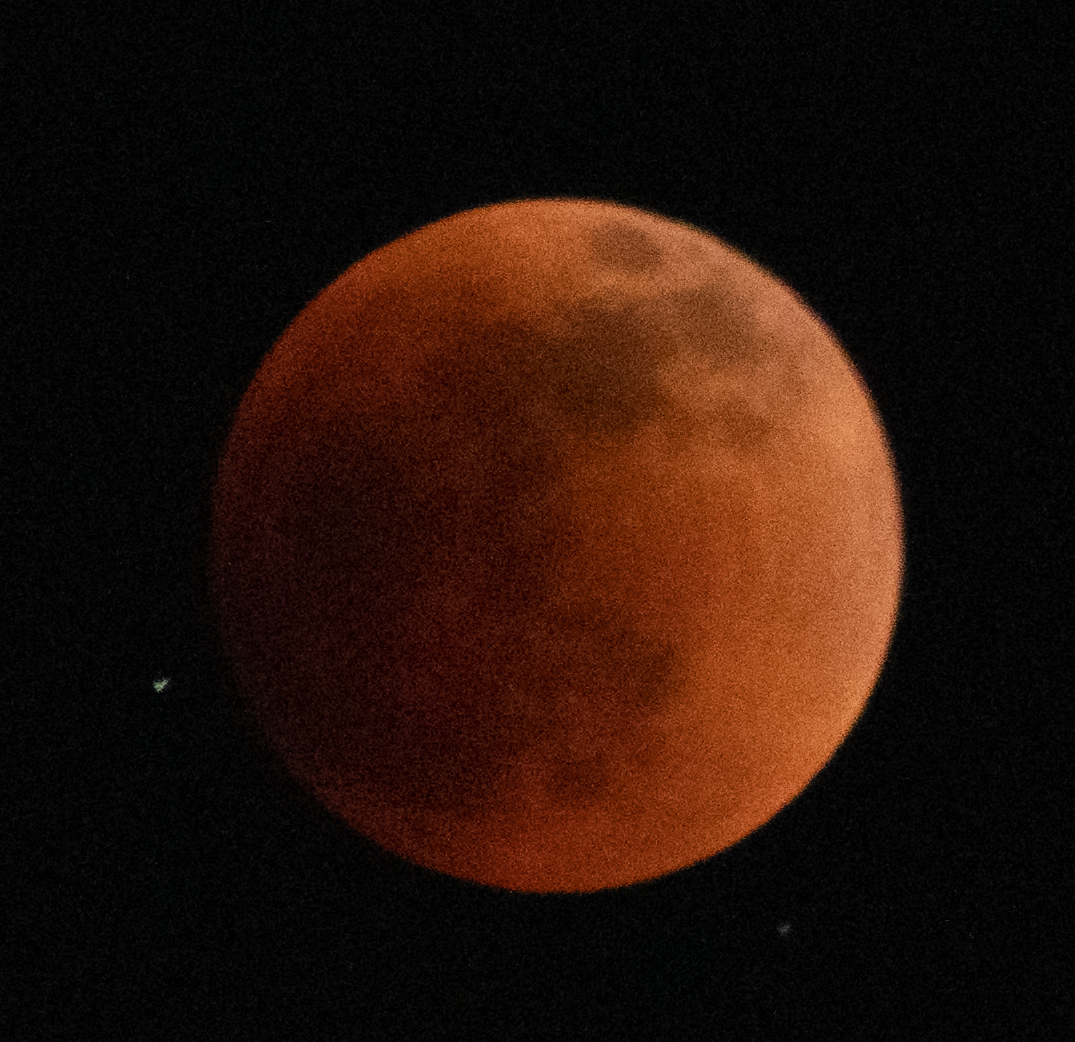
San Antonio, Texas, 3:36 UTC

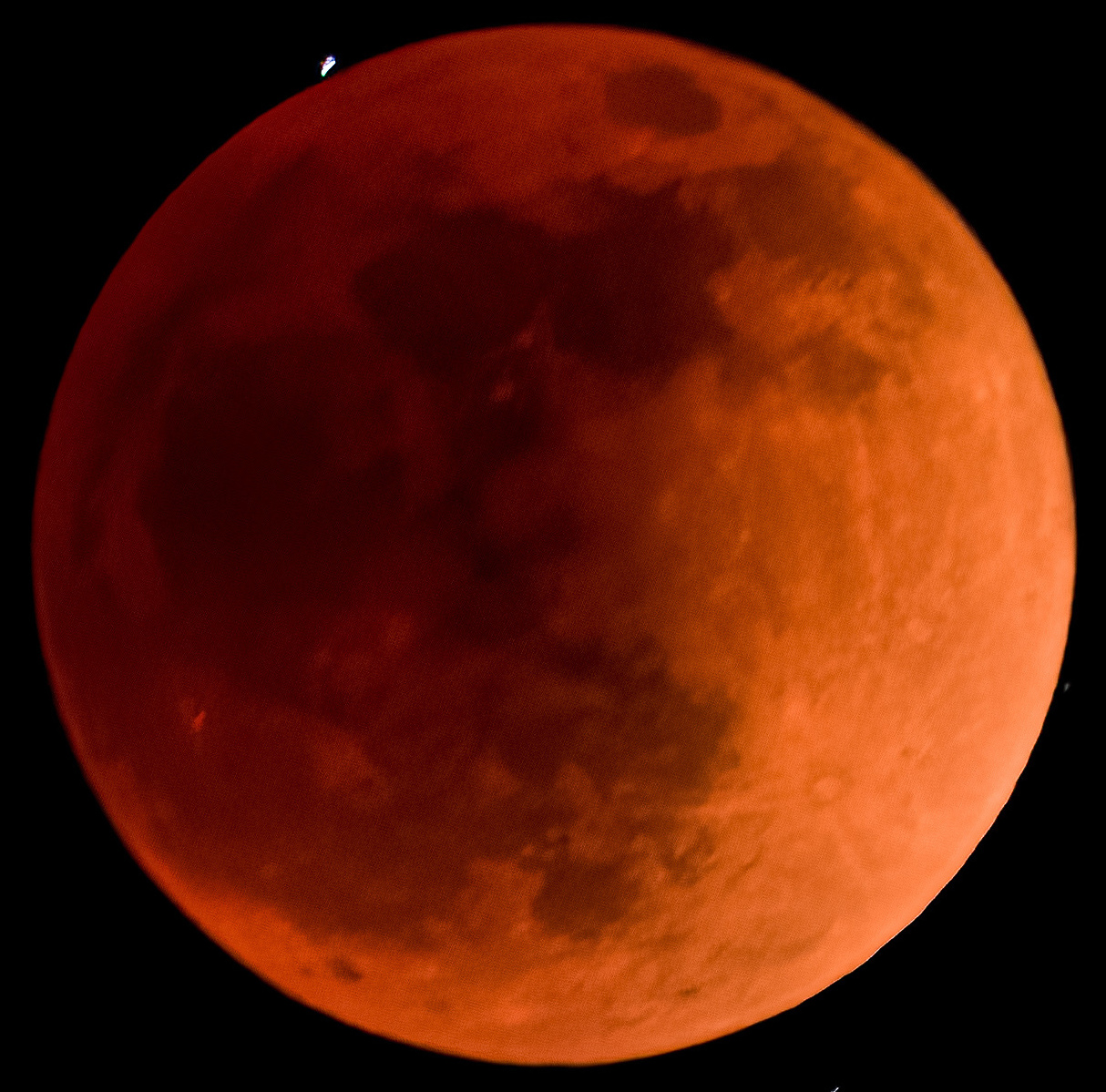
Irvine, California, 4:09 UTC

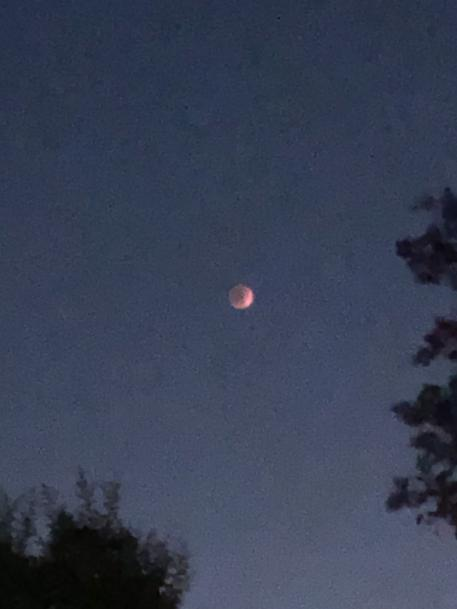
Santa Ana, California, 4:13 UTC

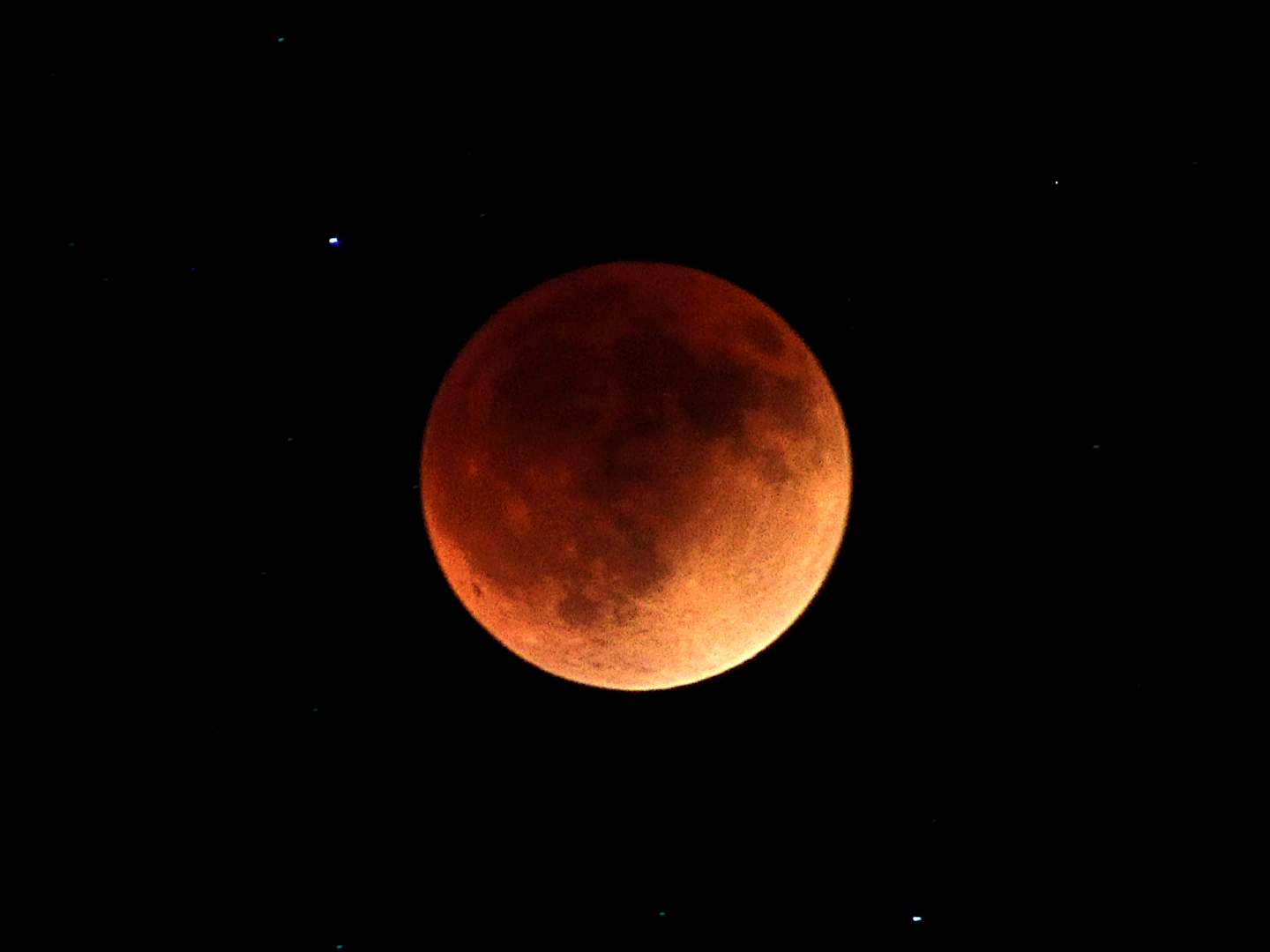
The Cliffs Valley, South Carolina, 4:15 UTC

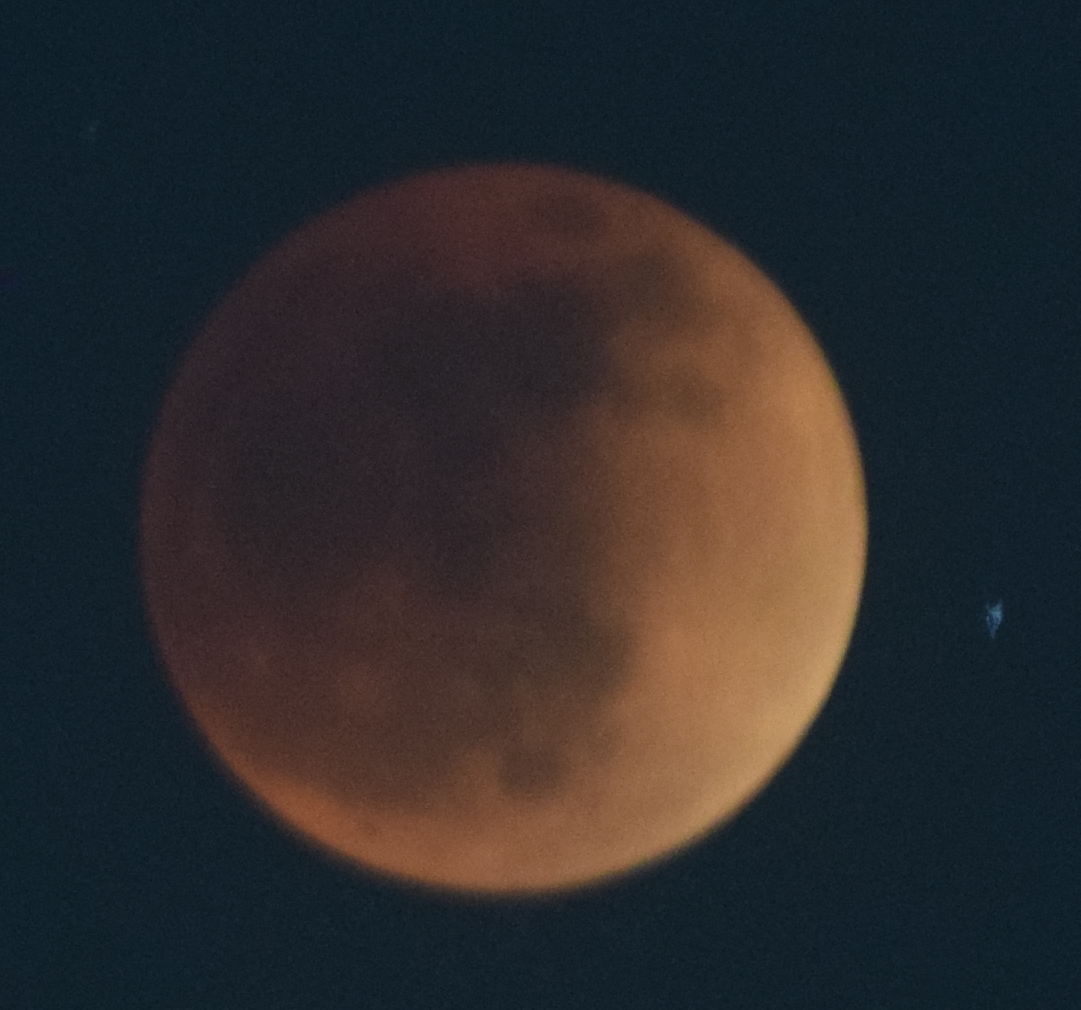
Mexico City, Mexico, 4:15 UTC

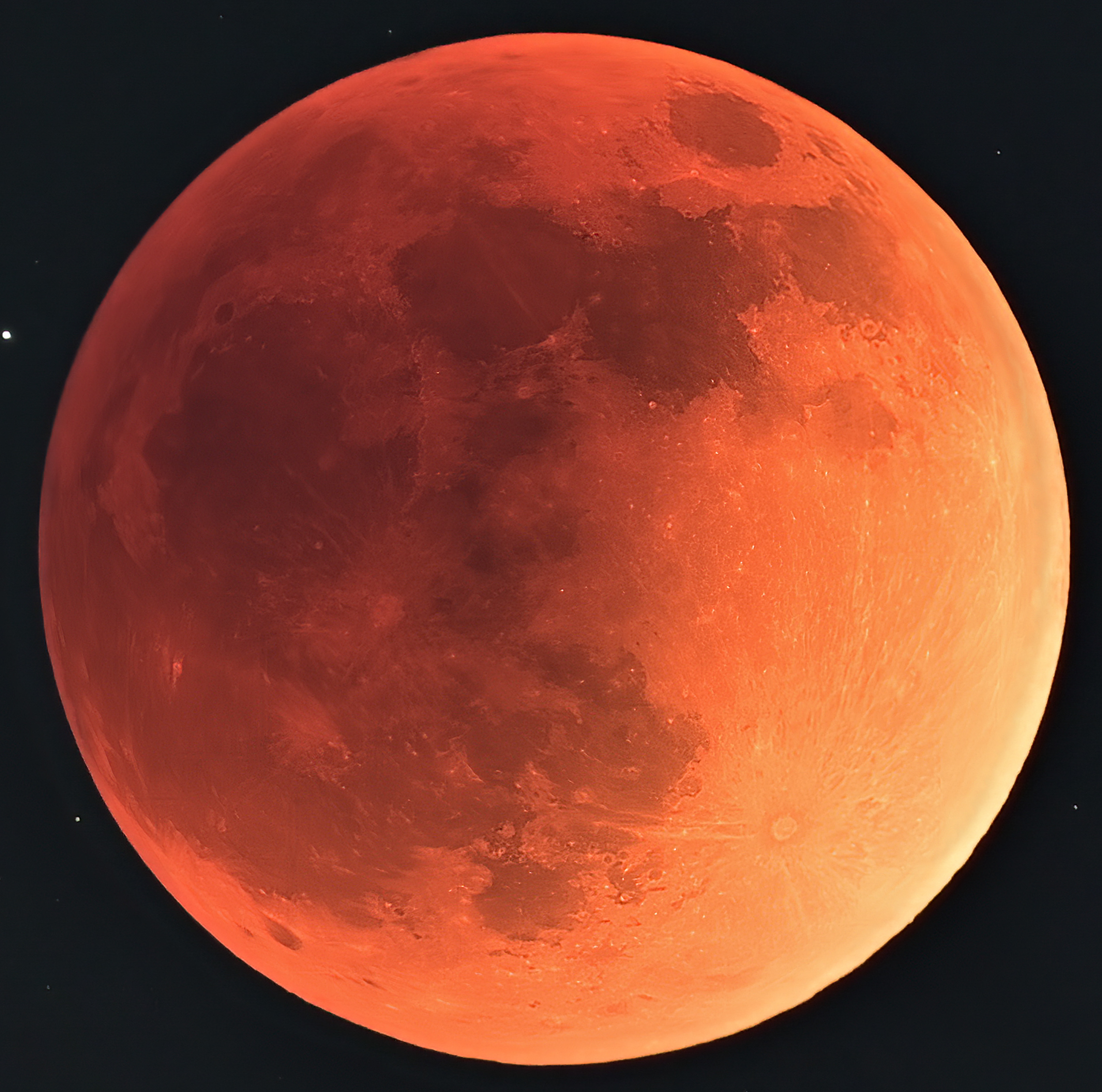
Houston, Texas, 4:16 UTC

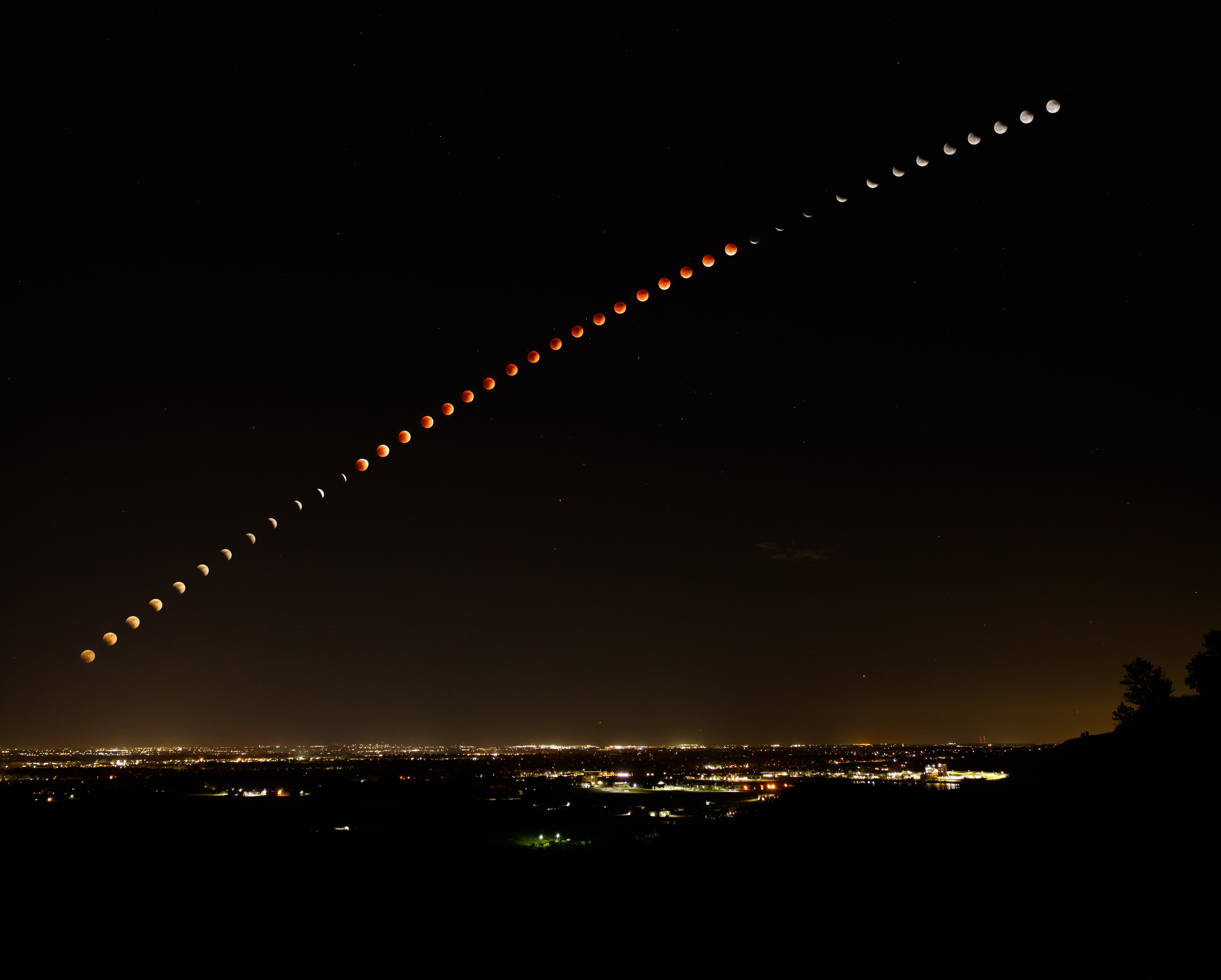
Eclipse progression from Fort Collins, Colorado

Eclipse progression from Minneapolis, Minnesota

Eclipse animation from Taubaté, Brazil

=== Europe ===
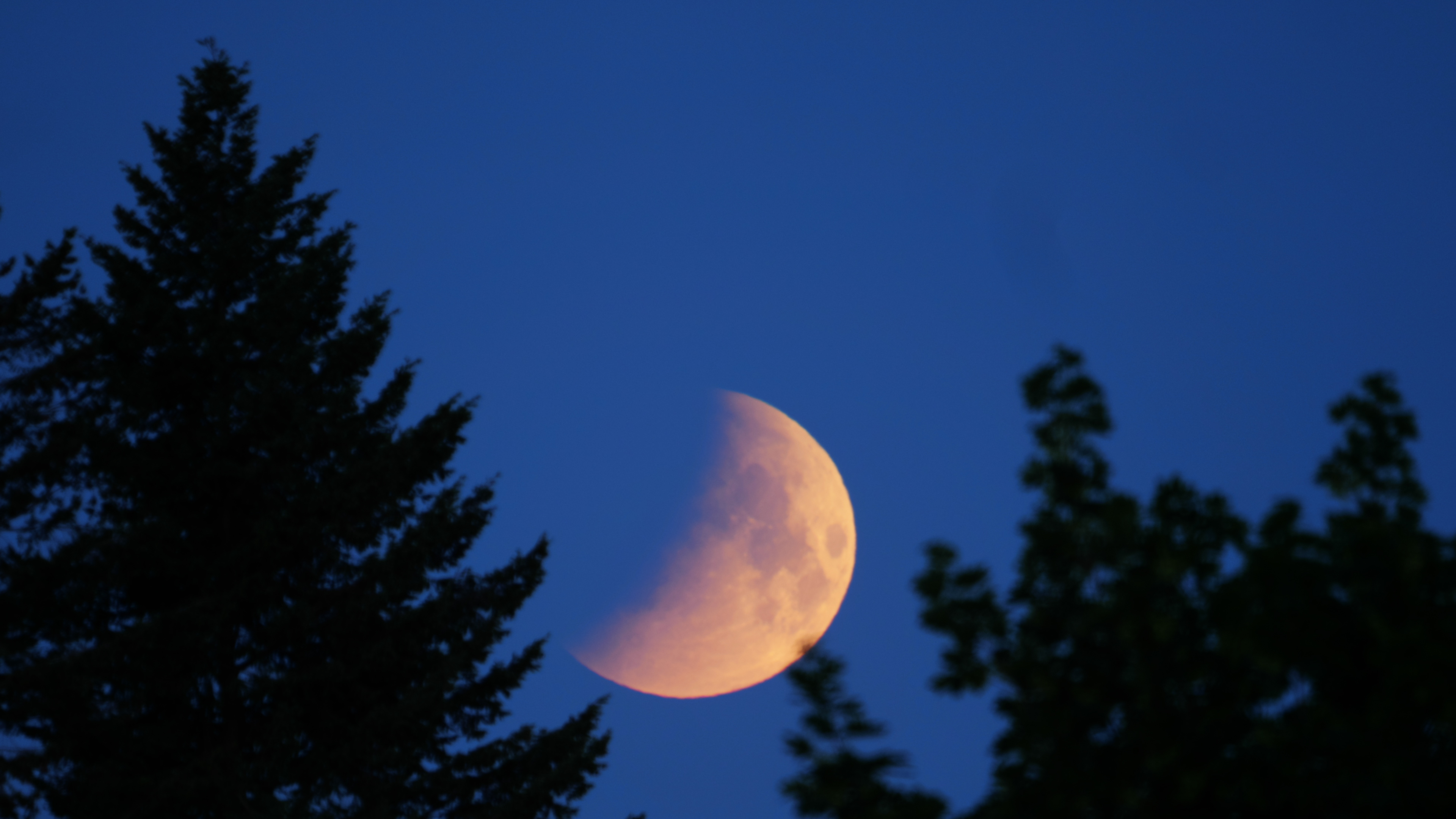
Berlin, Germany at moonset, 2:52 UTC

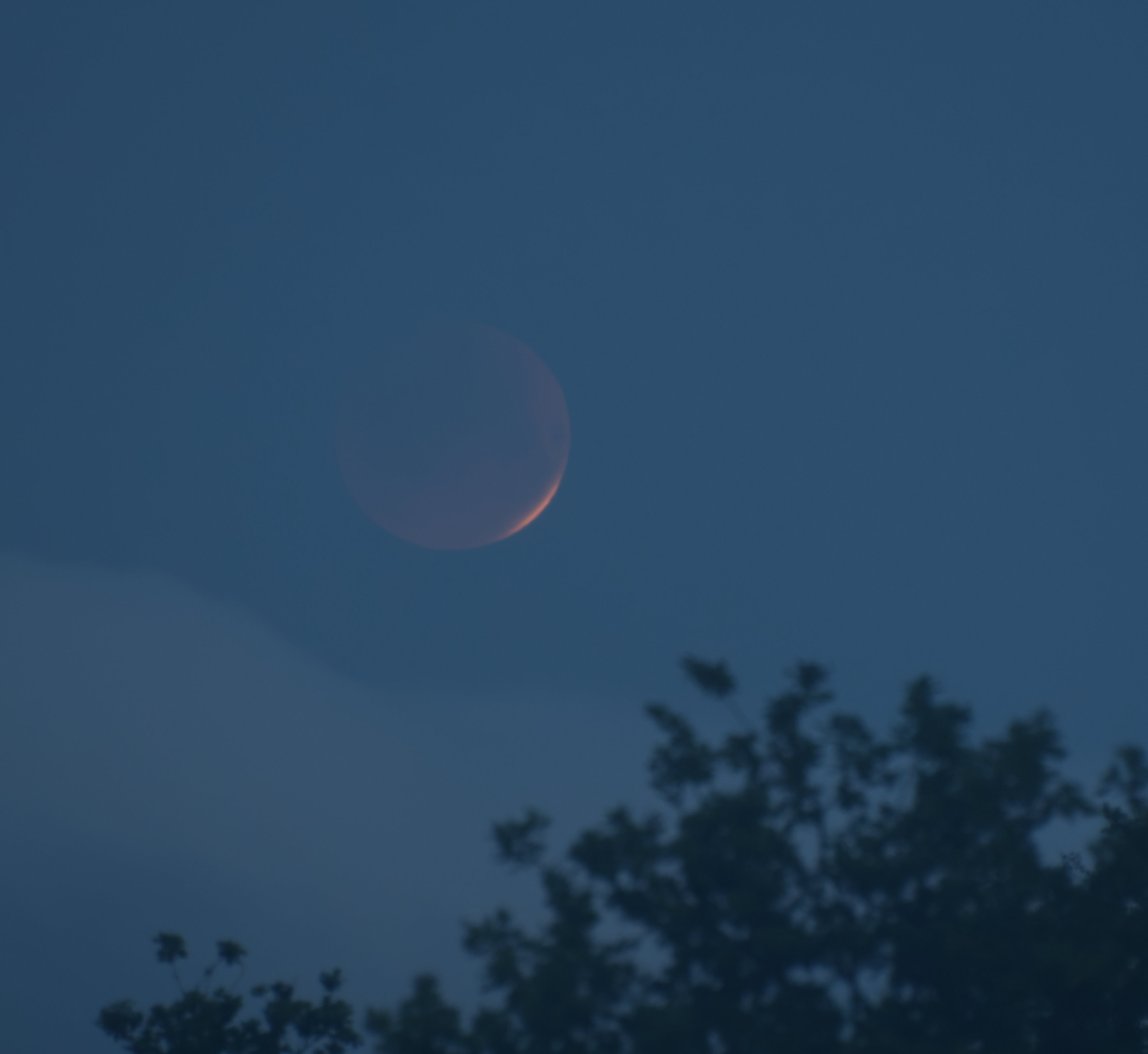
Chailey, England, 3:26 UTC

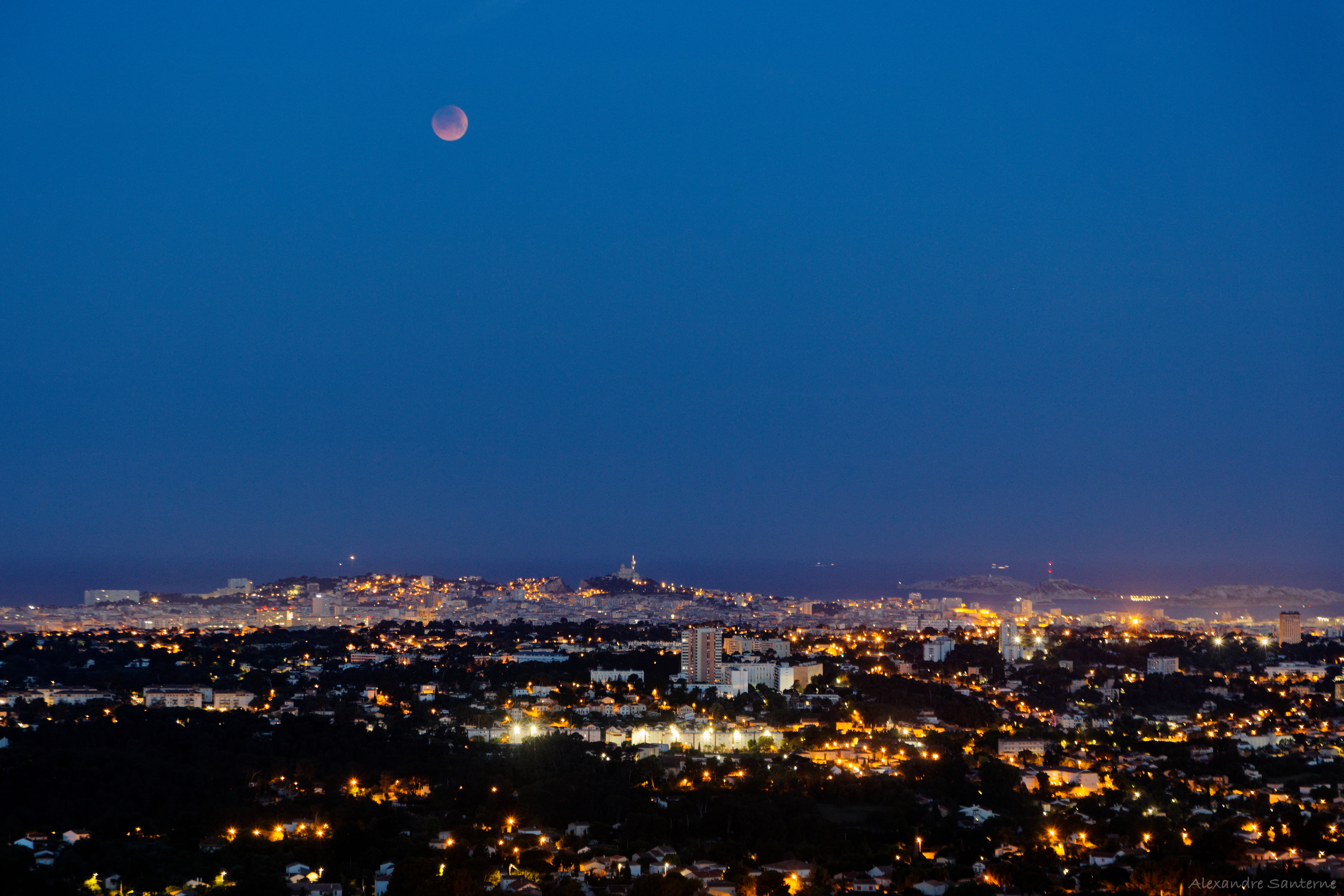
Totality from Allauch, France

Eclipse animation from Madrid, Spain

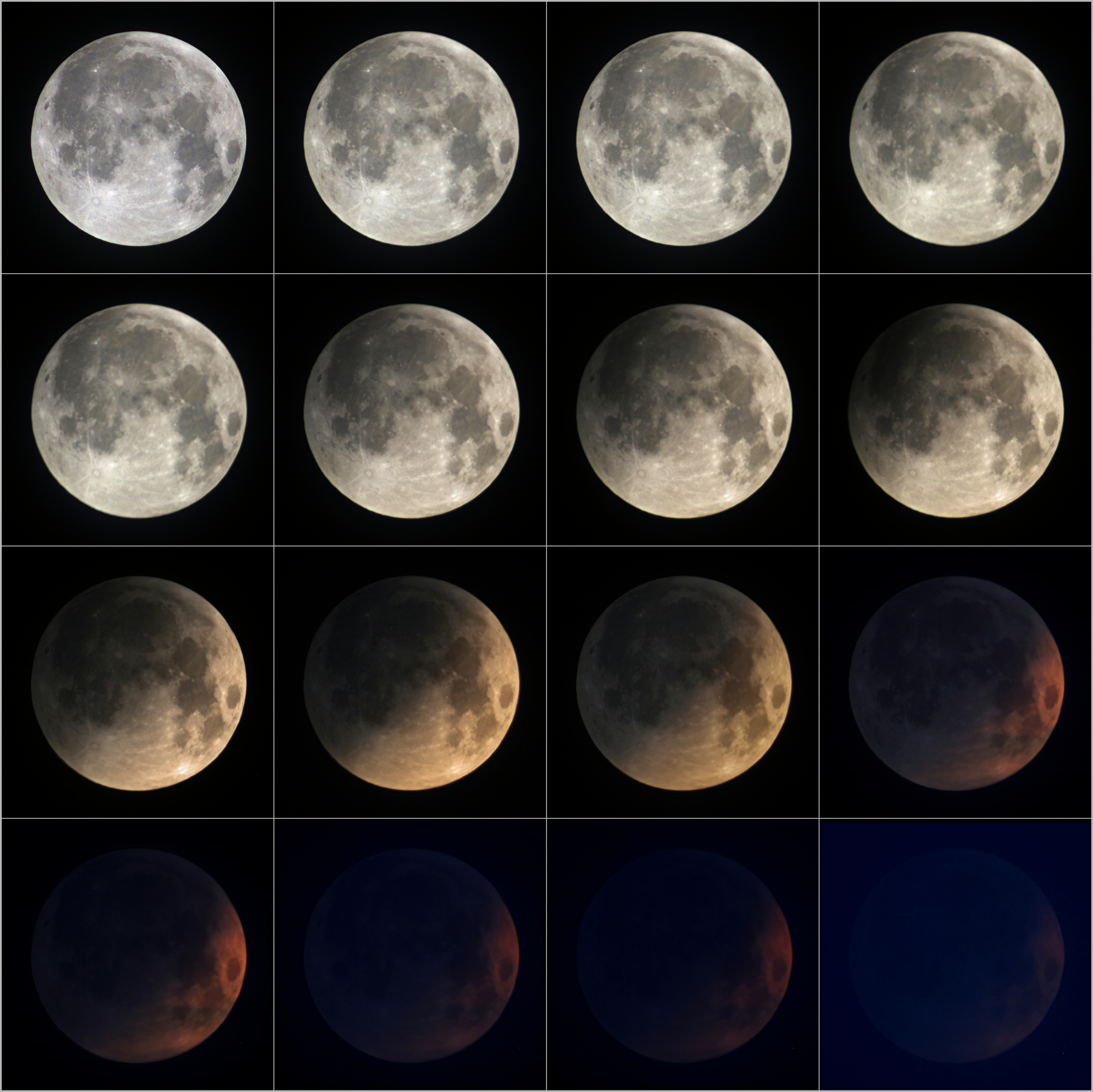
Eclipse progression from Oria, Italy

== Eclipse details ==
Shown below is a table displaying details about this particular solar eclipse. It describes various parameters pertaining to this eclipse.

May 16, 2022 Lunar Eclipse Parameters
Parameter	Value
Penumbral Magnitude	2.37433
Umbral Magnitude	1.41545
Gamma	−0.25323
Sun Right Ascension	03^{h} 31^{m} 49.5^{s}
Sun Declination	+19° 05′ 13.4″
Sun Semi-Diameter	15′ 49.2″
Sun Equatorial Horizontal Parallax	08.7″
Moon Right Ascension	15^{h} 31^{m} 27.8^{s}
Moon Declination	−19°19′ 40.4″
Moon Semi-Diameter	16′ 29.9″
Moon Equatorial Horizontal Parallax	1°00′ 33.1″
ΔT	69.3 s

== Eclipse season ==
This eclipse is part of an eclipse season, a period, roughly every six months, when eclipses occur. Only two (or occasionally three) eclipse seasons occur each year, and each season lasts about 35 days and repeats just short of six months (173 days) later; thus two full eclipse seasons always occur each year. Either two or three eclipses happen each eclipse season. In the sequence below, each eclipse is separated by a fortnight.

Eclipse season of April–May 2022
April 30 Ascending node (new moon)	May 16 Descending node (full moon)
Partial solar eclipse Solar Saros 119	Total lunar eclipse Lunar Saros 131

== Related eclipses ==
=== Eclipses in 2022 ===
- A partial solar eclipse on April 30.
- A total lunar eclipse on May 16.
- A partial solar eclipse on October 25.
- A total lunar eclipse on November 8.

=== Metonic ===
- Preceded by: Lunar eclipse of July 27, 2018
- Followed by: Lunar eclipse of March 3, 2026

=== Tzolkinex ===
- Preceded by: Lunar eclipse of April 4, 2015
- Followed by: Lunar eclipse of June 26, 2029

=== Half-Saros ===
- Preceded by: Solar eclipse of May 10, 2013
- Followed by: Solar eclipse of May 21, 2031

=== Tritos ===
- Preceded by: Lunar eclipse of June 15, 2011
- Followed by: Lunar eclipse of April 14, 2033

=== Lunar Saros 131 ===
- Preceded by: Lunar eclipse of May 4, 2004
- Followed by: Lunar eclipse of May 26, 2040

=== Inex ===
- Preceded by: Lunar eclipse of June 4, 1993
- Followed by: Lunar eclipse of April 26, 2051

=== Triad ===
- Preceded by: Lunar eclipse of July 16, 1935
- Followed by: Lunar eclipse of March 17, 2109

=== Lunar eclipses of 2020–2023 ===
This eclipse is a member of a semester series. An eclipse in a semester series of lunar eclipses repeats approximately every 177 days and 4 hours (a semester) at alternating nodes of the Moon's orbit.

The penumbral lunar eclipses on January 10, 2020 and July 5, 2020 occur in the previous lunar year eclipse set.

Lunar eclipse series sets from 2020 to 2023
Descending node				Ascending node			
Saros	Date Viewing	Type Chart	Gamma	Saros	Date Viewing	Type Chart	Gamma
111	2020 Jun 05	Penumbral	1.2406	116	2020 Nov 30	Penumbral	−1.1309
121	2021 May 26	Total	0.4774	126	2021 Nov 19	Partial	−0.4553
131	2022 May 16	Total	−0.2532	136	2022 Nov 08	Total	0.2570
141	2023 May 05	Penumbral	−1.0350	146	2023 Oct 28	Partial	0.9472

=== Metonic series ===
The Metonic cycle repeats nearly exactly every 19 years and represents a Saros cycle plus one lunar year. Because it occurs on the same calendar date, the Earth's shadow will be in nearly the same location relative to the background stars.

1. 1984 May 15.19 - penumbral (111); 2. 2003 May 16.15 - total (121); 3. 2022 May 16.17 - total (131); 4. 2041 May 16.03 - penumbral (141)	1. 1984 Nov 08.75 - penumbral (116); 2. 2003 Nov 09.05 - total (126); 3. 2022 Nov 08.46 - total (136); 4. 2041 Nov 08.19 - partial (146); 5. 2060 Nov 08.17 - penumbral (156)

=== Saros 131 ===
This eclipse is a part of Saros series 131, repeating every 18 years, 11 days, and containing 72 events. The series started with a penumbral lunar eclipse on May 10, 1427. It contains partial eclipses from July 25, 1553 through March 22, 1932; total eclipses from April 2, 1950 through September 3, 2202; and a second set of partial eclipses from September 13, 2220 through April 9, 2563. The series ends at member 72 as a penumbral eclipse on July 7, 2707.

The longest duration of totality will be produced by member 38 at 100 minutes, 36 seconds on June 28, 2094. All eclipses in this series occur at the Moon’s descending node of orbit.

Greatest	First			
The greatest eclipse of the series will occur on 2094 Jun 28, lasting 100 minutes, 36 seconds.	Penumbral	Partial	Total	Central
The greatest eclipse of the series will occur on 2094 Jun 28, lasting 100 minutes, 36 seconds.	1427 May 10	1553 Jul 25	1950 Apr 02	2022 May 16
The greatest eclipse of the series will occur on 2094 Jun 28, lasting 100 minutes, 36 seconds.	Last			
The greatest eclipse of the series will occur on 2094 Jun 28, lasting 100 minutes, 36 seconds.	Central	Total	Partial	Penumbral
The greatest eclipse of the series will occur on 2094 Jun 28, lasting 100 minutes, 36 seconds.	2148 Jul 31	2202 Sep 03	2563 Apr 09	2707 Jul 07

Eclipses are tabulated in three columns; every third eclipse in the same column is one exeligmos apart, so they all cast shadows over approximately the same parts of the Earth.

Series members 22–43 occur between 1801 and 2200:
22	23	24
1806 Jan 05	1824 Jan 16	1842 Jan 26
25	26	27
1860 Feb 07	1878 Feb 17	1896 Feb 28
28	29	30
1914 Mar 12	1932 Mar 22	1950 Apr 02
31	32	33
1968 Apr 13	1986 Apr 24	2004 May 04
34	35	36
2022 May 16	2040 May 26	2058 Jun 06
37	38	39
2076 Jun 17	2094 Jun 28	2112 Jul 09
40	41	42
2130 Jul 21	2148 Jul 31	2166 Aug 11
43
2184 Aug 21

=== Tritos series ===
This eclipse is a part of a tritos cycle, repeating at alternating nodes every 135 synodic months (≈ 3986.63 days, or 11 years minus 1 month). Their appearance and longitude are irregular due to a lack of synchronization with the anomalistic month (period of perigee), but groupings of 3 tritos cycles (≈ 33 years minus 3 months) come close (≈ 434.044 anomalistic months), so eclipses are similar in these groupings.

Series members between 1801 and 2200
1804 Jan 26 (Saros 111)	1814 Dec 26 (Saros 112)	1825 Nov 25 (Saros 113)	1836 Oct 24 (Saros 114)	1847 Sep 24 (Saros 115)
1858 Aug 24 (Saros 116)	1869 Jul 23 (Saros 117)	1880 Jun 22 (Saros 118)	1891 May 23 (Saros 119)	1902 Apr 22 (Saros 120)
1913 Mar 22 (Saros 121)	1924 Feb 20 (Saros 122)	1935 Jan 19 (Saros 123)	1945 Dec 19 (Saros 124)	1956 Nov 18 (Saros 125)
1967 Oct 18 (Saros 126)	1978 Sep 16 (Saros 127)	1989 Aug 17 (Saros 128)	2000 Jul 16 (Saros 129)	2011 Jun 15 (Saros 130)
2022 May 16 (Saros 131)	2033 Apr 14 (Saros 132)	2044 Mar 13 (Saros 133)	2055 Feb 11 (Saros 134)	2066 Jan 11 (Saros 135)
2076 Dec 10 (Saros 136)	2087 Nov 10 (Saros 137)	2098 Oct 10 (Saros 138)	2109 Sep 09 (Saros 139)	2120 Aug 09 (Saros 140)
2131 Jul 10 (Saros 141)	2142 Jun 08 (Saros 142)	2153 May 08 (Saros 143)	2164 Apr 07 (Saros 144)	2175 Mar 07 (Saros 145)
2186 Feb 04 (Saros 146)	2197 Jan 04 (Saros 147)			

=== Inex series ===
This eclipse is a part of the long period inex cycle, repeating at alternating nodes, every 358 synodic months (≈ 10,571.95 days, or 29 years minus 20 days). Their appearance and longitude are irregular due to a lack of synchronization with the anomalistic month (period of perigee). However, groupings of 3 inex cycles (≈ 87 years minus 2 months) comes close (≈ 1,151.02 anomalistic months), so eclipses are similar in these groupings.

Series members between 1801 and 2200
1819 Oct 03 (Saros 124)	1848 Sep 13 (Saros 125)	1877 Aug 23 (Saros 126)
1906 Aug 04 (Saros 127)	1935 Jul 16 (Saros 128)	1964 Jun 25 (Saros 129)
1993 Jun 04 (Saros 130)	2022 May 16 (Saros 131)	2051 Apr 26 (Saros 132)
2080 Apr 04 (Saros 133)	2109 Mar 17 (Saros 134)	2138 Feb 24 (Saros 135)
2167 Feb 04 (Saros 136)	2196 Jan 15 (Saros 137)	

=== Half-Saros cycle ===
A lunar eclipse will be preceded and followed by solar eclipses by 9 years and 5.5 days (a half saros). This lunar eclipse is related to two annular solar eclipses of Solar Saros 138.

May 10, 2013	May 21, 2031

== See also ==
- List of lunar eclipses and List of 21st-century lunar eclipses
