= March 1932 lunar eclipse =

Partial lunar eclipse of March 1932

- Partial eclipse
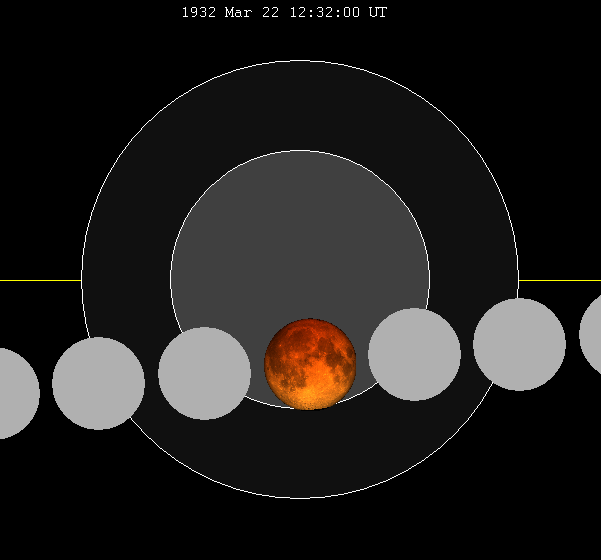
- The Moon's hourly motion shown right to left
- Date: March 22, 1932
- Gamma: −0.4956
- Magnitude: 0.9666
- Saros cycle: 131 (29 of 72)
- Partiality: 185 minutes, 20 seconds
- Penumbral: 303 minutes, 51 seconds
Contacts (UTC)
- P1: 10:00:20
- U1: 10:59:36
- Greatest: 12:32:15
- U4: 14:04:57
- P4: 15:04:11

A partial lunar eclipse occurred at the Moon’s descending node of orbit on Tuesday, March 22, 1932, with an umbral magnitude of 0.9666. A lunar eclipse occurs when the Moon moves into the Earth's shadow, causing the Moon to be darkened. A partial lunar eclipse occurs when one part of the Moon is in the Earth's umbra, while the other part is in the Earth's penumbra. Unlike a solar eclipse, which can only be viewed from a relatively small area of the world, a lunar eclipse may be viewed from anywhere on the night side of Earth. Occurring only about 21 hours before perigee (on March 23, 1932, at 9:10 UTC), the Moon's apparent diameter was larger.

This was the last of the first set of partial lunar eclipses in Lunar Saros 131, preceding the first total eclipse on April 2, 1950.

== Visibility ==
The eclipse was completely visible over northeast Asia, Australia, and northwestern North America, seen rising over much of Asia and setting over much of North America and western South America.

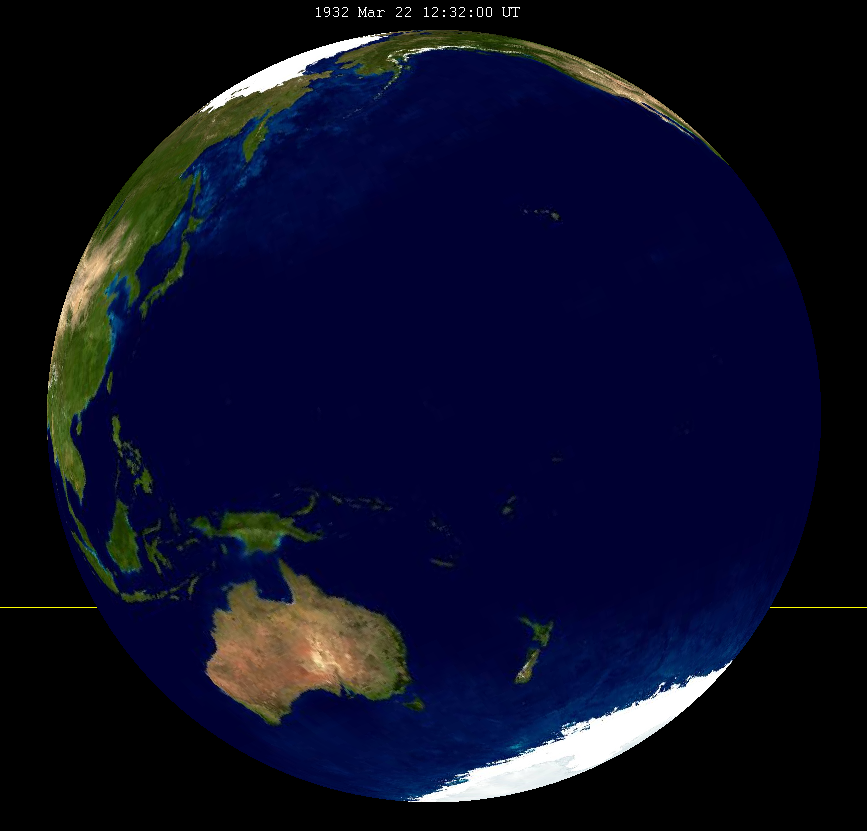
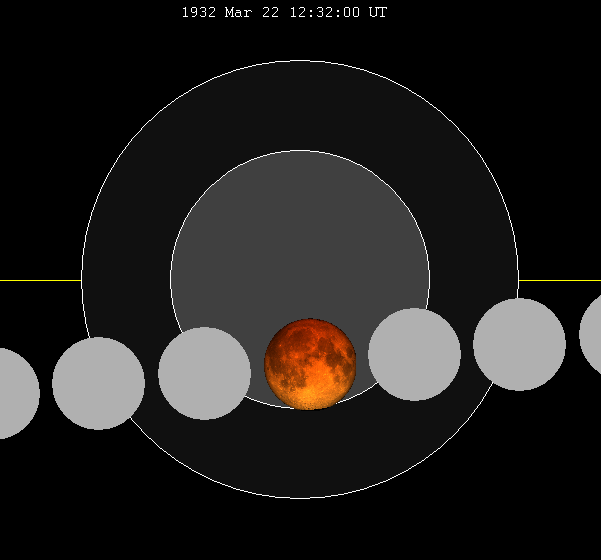

== Eclipse details ==
Shown below is a table displaying details about this particular lunar eclipse. It describes various parameters pertaining to this eclipse.

March 22, 1932 Lunar Eclipse Parameters
Parameter	Value
Penumbral Magnitude	1.93030
Umbral Magnitude	0.96656
Gamma	−0.49562
Sun Right Ascension	00h06m09.9s
Sun Declination	+00°40'06.5"
Sun Semi-Diameter	16'02.7"
Sun Equatorial Horizontal Parallax	08.8"
Moon Right Ascension	12h05m11.0s
Moon Declination	-01°06'34.4"
Moon Semi-Diameter	16'39.0"
Moon Equatorial Horizontal Parallax	1°01'06.3"
ΔT	24.0 s

== Eclipse season ==
This eclipse is part of an eclipse season, a period, roughly every six months, when eclipses occur. Only two (or occasionally three) eclipse seasons occur each year, and each season lasts about 35 days and repeats just short of six months (173 days) later; thus two full eclipse seasons always occur each year. Either two or three eclipses happen each eclipse season. In the sequence below, each eclipse is separated by a fortnight.

Eclipse season of March 1932
March 7 Ascending node (new moon)	March 22 Descending node (full moon)
Annular solar eclipse Solar Saros 119	Partial lunar eclipse Lunar Saros 131

== Related eclipses ==
=== Eclipses in 1932 ===
- An annular solar eclipse on March 7.
- A partial lunar eclipse on March 22.
- A total solar eclipse on August 31.
- A partial lunar eclipse on September 14.

=== Metonic ===
- Preceded by: Lunar eclipse of June 3, 1928
- Followed by: Lunar eclipse of January 8, 1936

=== Tzolkinex ===
- Preceded by: Lunar eclipse of February 8, 1925
- Followed by: Lunar eclipse of May 3, 1939

=== Half-Saros ===
- Preceded by: Solar eclipse of March 17, 1923
- Followed by: Solar eclipse of March 27, 1941

=== Tritos ===
- Preceded by: Lunar eclipse of April 22, 1921
- Followed by: Lunar eclipse of February 20, 1943

=== Lunar Saros 131 ===
- Preceded by: Lunar eclipse of March 12, 1914
- Followed by: Lunar eclipse of April 2, 1950

=== Inex ===
- Preceded by: Lunar eclipse of April 12, 1903
- Followed by: Lunar eclipse of March 2, 1961

=== Triad ===
- Preceded by: Lunar eclipse of May 21, 1845
- Followed by: Lunar eclipse of January 21, 2019

=== Lunar eclipses of 1930–1933 ===
This eclipse is a member of a semester series. An eclipse in a semester series of lunar eclipses repeats approximately every 177 days and 4 hours (a semester) at alternating nodes of the Moon's orbit.

The penumbral lunar eclipses on February 10, 1933 and August 5, 1933 occur in the next lunar year eclipse set.

Lunar eclipse series sets from 1930 to 1933
Descending node				Ascending node			
Saros	Date Viewing	Type Chart	Gamma	Saros	Date Viewing	Type Chart	Gamma
111	1930 Apr 13	Partial	0.9545	116	1930 Oct 07	Partial	−0.9812
121	1931 Apr 02	Total	0.2043	126	1931 Sep 26	Total	−0.2698
131	1932 Mar 22	Partial	−0.4956	136	1932 Sep 14	Partial	0.4664
141	1933 Mar 12	Penumbral	−1.2369	146	1933 Sep 04	Penumbral	1.1776

=== Saros 131 ===
This eclipse is a part of Saros series 131, repeating every 18 years, 11 days, and containing 72 events. The series started with a penumbral lunar eclipse on May 10, 1427. It contains partial eclipses from July 25, 1553 through March 22, 1932; total eclipses from April 2, 1950 through September 3, 2202; and a second set of partial eclipses from September 13, 2220 through April 9, 2563. The series ends at member 72 as a penumbral eclipse on July 7, 2707.

The longest duration of totality will be produced by member 38 at 100 minutes, 36 seconds on June 28, 2094. All eclipses in this series occur at the Moon’s descending node of orbit.

Greatest	First			
The greatest eclipse of the series will occur on 2094 Jun 28, lasting 100 minutes, 36 seconds.	Penumbral	Partial	Total	Central
The greatest eclipse of the series will occur on 2094 Jun 28, lasting 100 minutes, 36 seconds.	1427 May 10	1553 Jul 25	1950 Apr 02	2022 May 16
The greatest eclipse of the series will occur on 2094 Jun 28, lasting 100 minutes, 36 seconds.	Last			
The greatest eclipse of the series will occur on 2094 Jun 28, lasting 100 minutes, 36 seconds.	Central	Total	Partial	Penumbral
The greatest eclipse of the series will occur on 2094 Jun 28, lasting 100 minutes, 36 seconds.	2148 Jul 31	2202 Sep 03	2563 Apr 09	2707 Jul 07

Eclipses are tabulated in three columns; every third eclipse in the same column is one exeligmos apart, so they all cast shadows over approximately the same parts of the Earth.

Series members 22–43 occur between 1801 and 2200:
22	23	24
1806 Jan 05	1824 Jan 16	1842 Jan 26
25	26	27
1860 Feb 07	1878 Feb 17	1896 Feb 28
28	29	30
1914 Mar 12	1932 Mar 22	1950 Apr 02
31	32	33
1968 Apr 13	1986 Apr 24	2004 May 04
34	35	36
2022 May 16	2040 May 26	2058 Jun 06
37	38	39
2076 Jun 17	2094 Jun 28	2112 Jul 09
40	41	42
2130 Jul 21	2148 Jul 31	2166 Aug 11
43
2184 Aug 21

=== Tritos series ===
This eclipse is a part of a tritos cycle, repeating at alternating nodes every 135 synodic months (≈ 3986.63 days, or 11 years minus 1 month). Their appearance and longitude are irregular due to a lack of synchronization with the anomalistic month (period of perigee), but groupings of 3 tritos cycles (≈ 33 years minus 3 months) come close (≈ 434.044 anomalistic months), so eclipses are similar in these groupings.

Series members between 1801 and 2200
1801 Mar 30 (Saros 119)	1812 Feb 27 (Saros 120)	1823 Jan 26 (Saros 121)	1833 Dec 26 (Saros 122)	1844 Nov 24 (Saros 123)
1855 Oct 25 (Saros 124)	1866 Sep 24 (Saros 125)	1877 Aug 23 (Saros 126)	1888 Jul 23 (Saros 127)	1899 Jun 23 (Saros 128)
1910 May 24 (Saros 129)	1921 Apr 22 (Saros 130)	1932 Mar 22 (Saros 131)	1943 Feb 20 (Saros 132)	1954 Jan 19 (Saros 133)
1964 Dec 19 (Saros 134)	1975 Nov 18 (Saros 135)	1986 Oct 17 (Saros 136)	1997 Sep 16 (Saros 137)	2008 Aug 16 (Saros 138)
2019 Jul 16 (Saros 139)	2030 Jun 15 (Saros 140)	2041 May 16 (Saros 141)	2052 Apr 14 (Saros 142)	2063 Mar 14 (Saros 143)
2074 Feb 11 (Saros 144)	2085 Jan 10 (Saros 145)	2095 Dec 11 (Saros 146)	2106 Nov 11 (Saros 147)	2117 Oct 10 (Saros 148)
2128 Sep 09 (Saros 149)	2139 Aug 10 (Saros 150)	2150 Jul 09 (Saros 151)	2161 Jun 08 (Saros 152)	2172 May 08 (Saros 153)
	2194 Mar 07 (Saros 155)			

=== Inex series ===
This eclipse is a part of the long period inex cycle, repeating at alternating nodes, every 358 synodic months (≈ 10,571.95 days, or 29 years minus 20 days). Their appearance and longitude are irregular due to a lack of synchronization with the anomalistic month (period of perigee). However, groupings of 3 inex cycles (≈ 87 years minus 2 months) comes close (≈ 1,151.02 anomalistic months), so eclipses are similar in these groupings.

Series members between 1801 and 2200
1816 Jun 10 (Saros 127)	1845 May 21 (Saros 128)	1874 May 01 (Saros 129)
1903 Apr 12 (Saros 130)	1932 Mar 22 (Saros 131)	1961 Mar 02 (Saros 132)
1990 Feb 09 (Saros 133)	2019 Jan 21 (Saros 134)	2048 Jan 01 (Saros 135)
2076 Dec 10 (Saros 136)	2105 Nov 21 (Saros 137)	2134 Nov 02 (Saros 138)
2163 Oct 12 (Saros 139)	2192 Sep 21 (Saros 140)	

=== Half-Saros cycle ===
A lunar eclipse will be preceded and followed by solar eclipses by 9 years and 5.5 days (a half saros). This lunar eclipse is related to two total solar eclipses of Solar Saros 138.

March 17, 1923	March 27, 1941

== See also ==
- List of lunar eclipses
- List of 20th-century lunar eclipses
