= June 2058 lunar eclipse =

Astronomical event

- Total eclipse
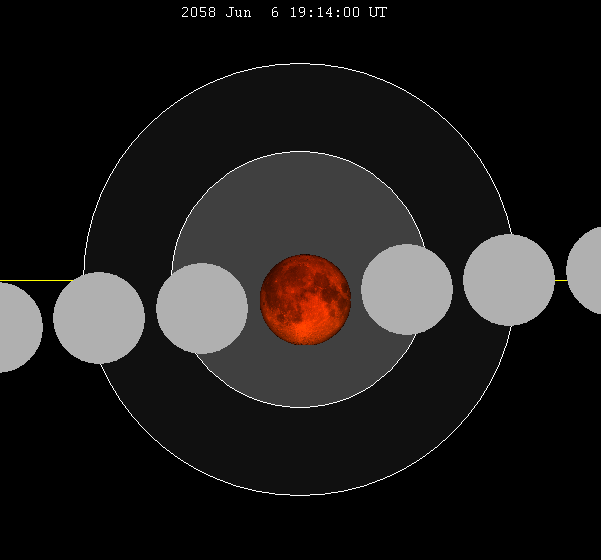
- The Moon's hourly motion shown right to left
- Date: June 6, 2058
- Gamma: −0.1181
- Magnitude: 1.6628
- Saros cycle: 131 (36 of 72)
- Totality: 97 minutes, 19 seconds
- Partiality: 213 minutes, 22 seconds
- Penumbral: 323 minutes, 37 seconds
Contacts (UTC)
- P1: 16:32:07
- U1: 17:27:17
- U2: 18:25:19
- Greatest: 19:15:48
- U3: 20:02:38
- U4: 21:00:40
- P4: 21:55:44

A total lunar eclipse will occur at the Moon’s descending node of orbit on Thursday, June 6, 2058, with an umbral magnitude of 1.6628. It will be a central lunar eclipse, in which part of the Moon will pass through the center of the Earth's shadow. A lunar eclipse occurs when the Moon moves into the Earth's shadow, causing the Moon to be darkened. A total lunar eclipse occurs when the Moon's near side entirely passes into the Earth's umbral shadow. Unlike a solar eclipse, which can only be viewed from a relatively small area of the world, a lunar eclipse may be viewed from anywhere on the night side of Earth. A total lunar eclipse can last up to nearly two hours, while a total solar eclipse lasts only a few minutes at any given place, because the Moon's shadow is smaller. Occurring about 1.6 days before perigee (on June 8, 2058, at 9:30 UTC), the Moon's apparent diameter will be larger.

During the eclipse, IC 4634 will be occulted by the Moon over Antarctica. Deep-sky objects are rarely occulted during a total eclipse from any given spot on Earth.

== Visibility ==
The eclipse will be completely visible over east Africa, Antarctica, west, central, and south Asia, and western Australia, seen rising over west Africa, Europe, and eastern South America and setting over east Asia and eastern Australia.

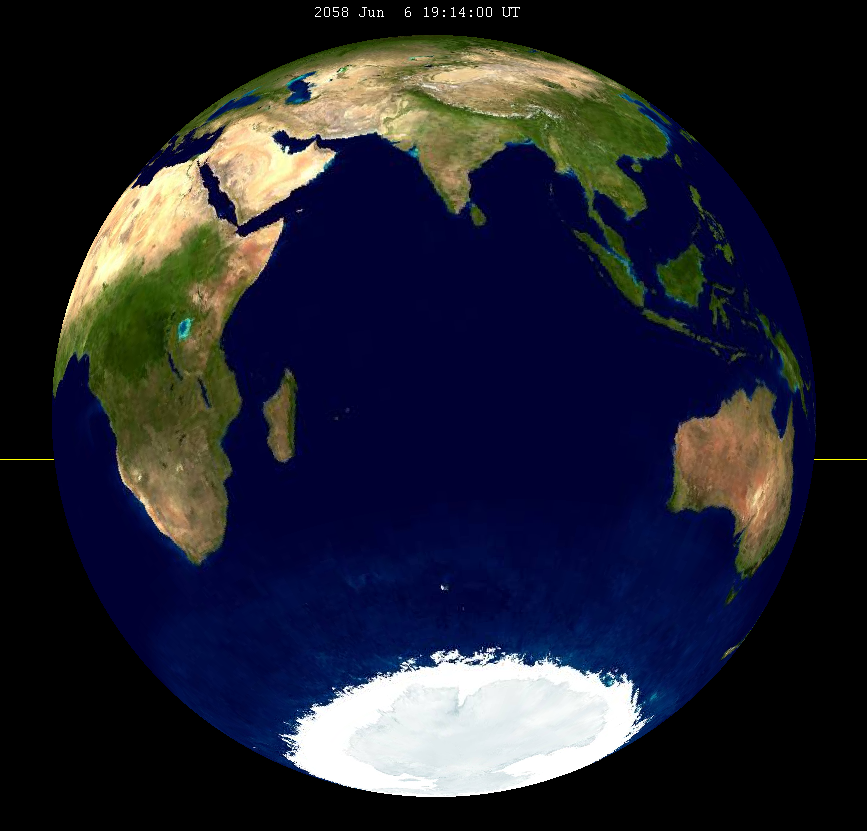
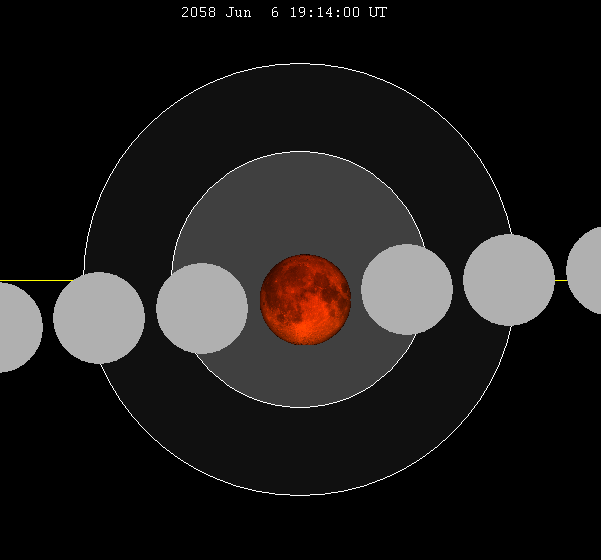

== Eclipse details ==
Shown below is a table displaying details about this particular solar eclipse. It describes various parameters pertaining to this eclipse.

June 6, 2058 Lunar Eclipse Parameters
Parameter	Value
Penumbral Magnitude	2.62261
Umbral Magnitude	1.66277
Gamma	−0.11810
Sun Right Ascension	05h00m41.7s
Sun Declination	+22°43'57.0"
Sun Semi-Diameter	15'45.8"
Sun Equatorial Horizontal Parallax	08.7"
Moon Right Ascension	17h00m35.5s
Moon Declination	-22°50'55.4"
Moon Semi-Diameter	16'25.3"
Moon Equatorial Horizontal Parallax	1°00'16.2"
ΔT	90.8 s

== Eclipse season ==
This eclipse is part of an eclipse season, a period, roughly every six months, when eclipses occur. Only two (or occasionally three) eclipse seasons occur each year, and each season lasts about 35 days and repeats just short of six months (173 days) later; thus two full eclipse seasons always occur each year. Either two or three eclipses happen each eclipse season. In the sequence below, each eclipse is separated by a fortnight. The first and last eclipse in this sequence is separated by one synodic month.

Eclipse season of May–June 2058
May 22 Ascending node (new moon)	June 6 Descending node (full moon)	June 21 Ascending node (new moon)
Partial solar eclipse Solar Saros 119	Total lunar eclipse Lunar Saros 131	Partial solar eclipse Solar Saros 157

== Related eclipses ==
=== Eclipses in 2058 ===
- A partial solar eclipse on May 22.
- A total lunar eclipse on June 6.
- A partial solar eclipse on June 21.
- A partial solar eclipse on November 16.
- A total lunar eclipse on November 30.

=== Metonic ===
- Preceded by: Lunar eclipse of August 18, 2054
- Followed by: Lunar eclipse of March 25, 2062

=== Tzolkinex ===
- Preceded by: Lunar eclipse of April 26, 2051
- Followed by: Lunar eclipse of July 17, 2065

=== Half-Saros ===
- Preceded by: Solar eclipse of May 31, 2049
- Followed by: Solar eclipse of June 11, 2067

=== Tritos ===
- Preceded by: Lunar eclipse of July 7, 2047
- Followed by: Lunar eclipse of May 6, 2069

=== Lunar Saros 131 ===
- Preceded by: Lunar eclipse of May 26, 2040
- Followed by: Lunar eclipse of June 17, 2076

=== Inex ===
- Preceded by: Lunar eclipse of June 26, 2029
- Followed by: Lunar eclipse of May 17, 2087

=== Triad ===
- Preceded by: Lunar eclipse of August 6, 1971
- Followed by: Lunar eclipse of April 7, 2145

=== Lunar eclipses of 2056–2060 ===
This eclipse is a member of a semester series. An eclipse in a semester series of lunar eclipses repeats approximately every 177 days and 4 hours (a semester) at alternating nodes of the Moon's orbit.

The penumbral lunar eclipses on February 1, 2056 and July 26, 2056 occur in the previous lunar year eclipse set, and the penumbral lunar eclipses on April 15, 2060 and October 9, 2060 occur in the next lunar year eclipse set.

Lunar eclipse series sets from 2056 to 2060
Descending node				Ascending node			
Saros	Date Viewing	Type Chart	Gamma	Saros	Date Viewing	Type Chart	Gamma
111	2056 Jun 27	Penumbral	1.3769	116	2056 Dec 22	Penumbral	−1.1559
121	2057 Jun 17	Partial	0.6167	126	2057 Dec 11	Partial	−0.4853
131	2058 Jun 06	Total	−0.1181	136	2058 Nov 30	Total	0.2208
141	2059 May 27	Partial	−0.9097	146	2059 Nov 19	Partial	0.9004
				156	2060 Nov 08	Penumbral	1.5332

=== Saros 131 ===
This eclipse is a part of Saros series 131, repeating every 18 years, 11 days, and containing 72 events. The series started with a penumbral lunar eclipse on May 10, 1427. It contains partial eclipses from July 25, 1553 through March 22, 1932; total eclipses from April 2, 1950 through September 3, 2202; and a second set of partial eclipses from September 13, 2220 through April 9, 2563. The series ends at member 72 as a penumbral eclipse on July 7, 2707.

The longest duration of totality will be produced by member 38 at 100 minutes, 36 seconds on June 28, 2094. All eclipses in this series occur at the Moon’s descending node of orbit.

Greatest	First			
The greatest eclipse of the series will occur on 2094 Jun 28, lasting 100 minutes, 36 seconds.	Penumbral	Partial	Total	Central
The greatest eclipse of the series will occur on 2094 Jun 28, lasting 100 minutes, 36 seconds.	1427 May 10	1553 Jul 25	1950 Apr 02	2022 May 16
The greatest eclipse of the series will occur on 2094 Jun 28, lasting 100 minutes, 36 seconds.	Last			
The greatest eclipse of the series will occur on 2094 Jun 28, lasting 100 minutes, 36 seconds.	Central	Total	Partial	Penumbral
The greatest eclipse of the series will occur on 2094 Jun 28, lasting 100 minutes, 36 seconds.	2148 Jul 31	2202 Sep 03	2563 Apr 09	2707 Jul 07

Eclipses are tabulated in three columns; every third eclipse in the same column is one exeligmos apart, so they all cast shadows over approximately the same parts of the Earth.

Series members 22–43 occur between 1801 and 2200:
22	23	24
1806 Jan 05	1824 Jan 16	1842 Jan 26
25	26	27
1860 Feb 07	1878 Feb 17	1896 Feb 28
28	29	30
1914 Mar 12	1932 Mar 22	1950 Apr 02
31	32	33
1968 Apr 13	1986 Apr 24	2004 May 04
34	35	36
2022 May 16	2040 May 26	2058 Jun 06
37	38	39
2076 Jun 17	2094 Jun 28	2112 Jul 09
40	41	42
2130 Jul 21	2148 Jul 31	2166 Aug 11
43
2184 Aug 21

=== Tritos series ===
This eclipse is a part of a tritos cycle, repeating at alternating nodes every 135 synodic months (≈ 3986.63 days, or 11 years minus 1 month). Their appearance and longitude are irregular due to a lack of synchronization with the anomalistic month (period of perigee), but groupings of 3 tritos cycles (≈ 33 years minus 3 months) come close (≈ 434.044 anomalistic months), so eclipses are similar in these groupings.

Series members between 1801 and 2200
1807 May 21 (Saros 108)	1818 Apr 21 (Saros 109)	1829 Mar 20 (Saros 110)	1840 Feb 17 (Saros 111)	1851 Jan 17 (Saros 112)
1861 Dec 17 (Saros 113)	1872 Nov 15 (Saros 114)	1883 Oct 16 (Saros 115)	1894 Sep 15 (Saros 116)	1905 Aug 15 (Saros 117)
1916 Jul 15 (Saros 118)	1927 Jun 15 (Saros 119)	1938 May 14 (Saros 120)	1949 Apr 13 (Saros 121)	1960 Mar 13 (Saros 122)
1971 Feb 10 (Saros 123)	1982 Jan 09 (Saros 124)	1992 Dec 09 (Saros 125)	2003 Nov 09 (Saros 126)	2014 Oct 08 (Saros 127)
2025 Sep 07 (Saros 128)	2036 Aug 07 (Saros 129)	2047 Jul 07 (Saros 130)	2058 Jun 06 (Saros 131)	2069 May 06 (Saros 132)
2080 Apr 04 (Saros 133)	2091 Mar 05 (Saros 134)	2102 Feb 03 (Saros 135)	2113 Jan 02 (Saros 136)	2123 Dec 03 (Saros 137)
2134 Nov 02 (Saros 138)	2145 Sep 30 (Saros 139)	2156 Aug 30 (Saros 140)	2167 Aug 01 (Saros 141)	2178 Jun 30 (Saros 142)
2189 May 29 (Saros 143)	2200 Apr 30 (Saros 144)			

=== Inex series ===
This eclipse is a part of the long period inex cycle, repeating at alternating nodes, every 358 synodic months (≈ 10,571.95 days, or 29 years minus 20 days). Their appearance and longitude are irregular due to a lack of synchronization with the anomalistic month (period of perigee). However, groupings of 3 inex cycles (≈ 87 years minus 2 months) comes close (≈ 1,151.02 anomalistic months), so eclipses are similar in these groupings.

Series members between 1801 and 2200
1826 Nov 14 (Saros 123)	1855 Oct 25 (Saros 124)	1884 Oct 04 (Saros 125)
1913 Sep 15 (Saros 126)	1942 Aug 26 (Saros 127)	1971 Aug 06 (Saros 128)
2000 Jul 16 (Saros 129)	2029 Jun 26 (Saros 130)	2058 Jun 06 (Saros 131)
2087 May 17 (Saros 132)	2116 Apr 27 (Saros 133)	2145 Apr 07 (Saros 134)
2174 Mar 18 (Saros 135)

=== Half-Saros cycle ===
A lunar eclipse will be preceded and followed by solar eclipses by 9 years and 5.5 days (a half saros). This lunar eclipse is related to two annular solar eclipses of Solar Saros 138.

May 31, 2049	June 11, 2067

== See also ==
- List of lunar eclipses and List of 21st-century lunar eclipses
