= June 2094 lunar eclipse =

Central lunar eclipse

- Total eclipse
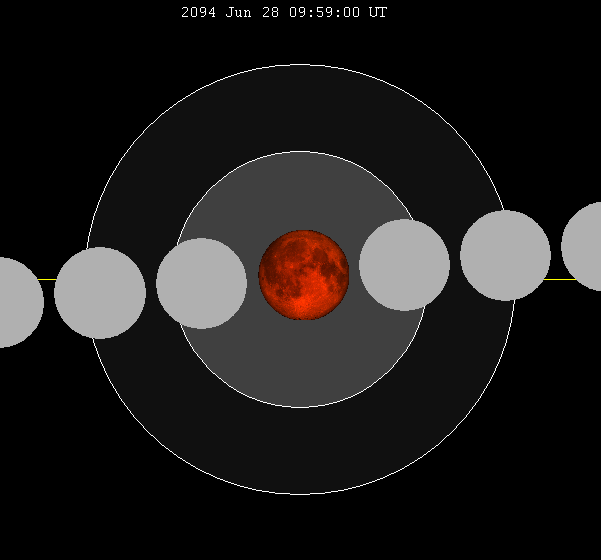
- The Moon's hourly motion shown right to left
- Date: June 28, 2094
- Gamma: 0.0288
- Magnitude: 1.8249
- Saros cycle: 131 (38 of 72)
- Totality: 100 minutes, 36 seconds
- Partiality: 235 minutes, 42 seconds
- Penumbral: 326 minutes, 27 seconds
Contacts (UTC)
- P1: 7:15:31
- U1: 8:10:57
- U2: 9:08:29
- Greatest: 9:58:47
- U3: 10:49:06
- U4: 11:46:39
- P4: 12:41:59

A total lunar eclipse will occur at the Moon’s descending node of orbit on Monday, June 28, 2094, with an umbral magnitude of 1.8249. It will be a central lunar eclipse, in which part of the Moon will pass through the center of the Earth's shadow. A lunar eclipse occurs when the Moon moves into the Earth's shadow, causing the Moon to be darkened. A total lunar eclipse occurs when the Moon's near side entirely passes into the Earth's umbral shadow. Unlike a solar eclipse, which can only be viewed from a relatively small area of the world, a lunar eclipse may be viewed from anywhere on the night side of Earth. A total lunar eclipse can last up to nearly two hours, while a total solar eclipse lasts only a few minutes at any given place, because the Moon's shadow is smaller. Occurring about 1.9 days before perigee (on June 30, 2094, at 7:50 UTC), the Moon's apparent diameter will be larger.

While the visual effect of a total eclipse is variable, the Moon may be stained a deep orange or red color at maximum eclipse. With a gamma value of only 0.0288 and an umbral eclipse magnitude of 1.8249, this is the greatest eclipse in Lunar Saros 131 as well as the second largest and darkest lunar eclipse of the 21st century.

During the eclipse, NGC 6629 will be occulted by the Moon over Northeast Australia and the Pacific Ocean; NGC 6642 will be occulted by the Moon over New Guinea, Northern Australia and the Pacific Ocean. Deep-sky objects are rarely occulted during a total eclipse from any given spot on Earth.

== Visibility ==
The eclipse will be completely visible over eastern Australia, Antarctica, and the central and eastern Pacific Ocean, seen rising over east Asia and western Australia and setting over North and South America.

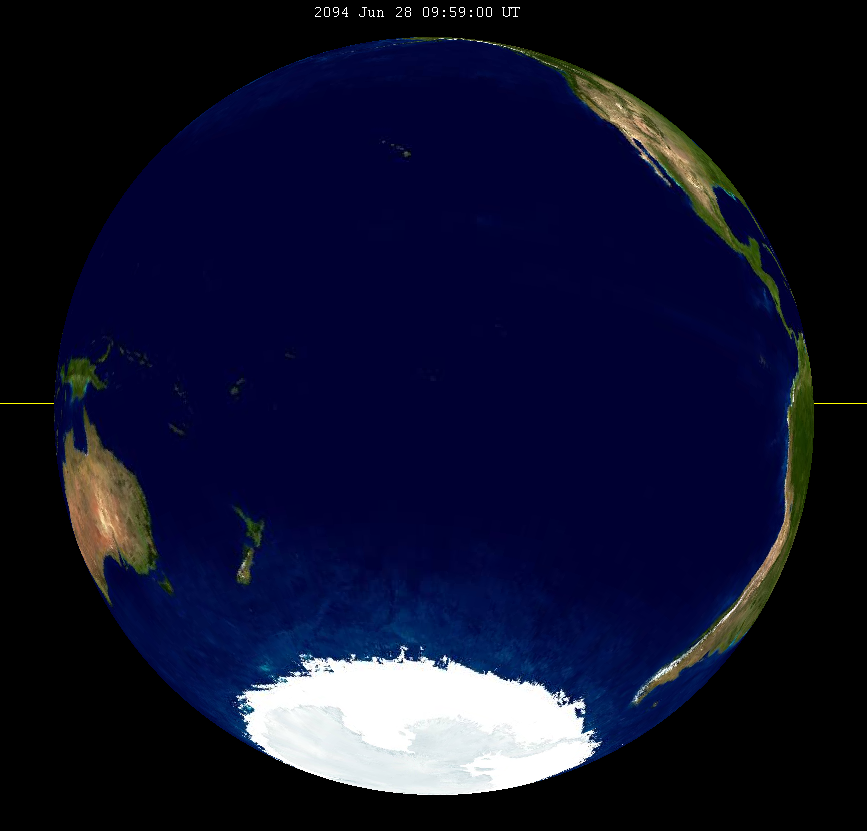
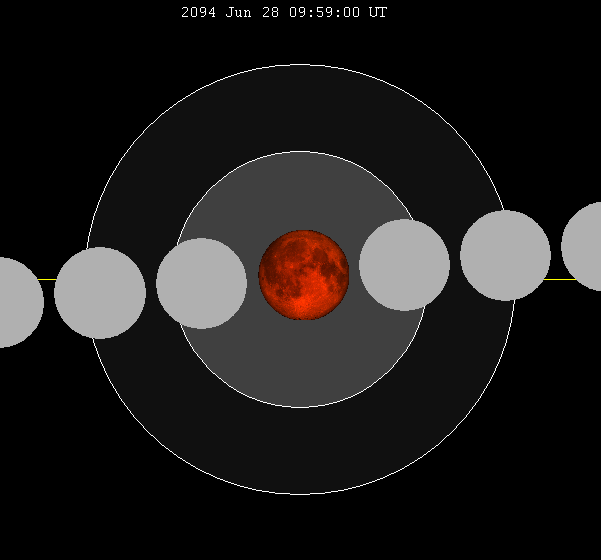

== Eclipse details ==
Shown below is a table displaying details about this particular lunar eclipse. It describes various parameters pertaining to this eclipse.

June 28, 2094 Lunar Eclipse Parameters
Parameter	Value
Penumbral Magnitude	2.78793
Umbral Magnitude	1.82485
Gamma	0.02882
Sun Right Ascension	06h31m43.3s
Sun Declination	+23°13'34.7"
Sun Semi-Diameter	15'44.1"
Sun Equatorial Horizontal Parallax	08.7"
Moon Right Ascension	18h31m43.6s
Moon Declination	-23°11'51.1"
Moon Semi-Diameter	16'20.2"
Moon Equatorial Horizontal Parallax	0°59'57.5"
ΔT	121.4 s

== Eclipse season ==
This eclipse is part of an eclipse season, a period, roughly every six months, when eclipses occur. Only two (or occasionally three) eclipse seasons occur each year, and each season lasts about 35 days and repeats just short of six months (173 days) later; thus two full eclipse seasons always occur each year. Either two or three eclipses happen each eclipse season. In the sequence below, each eclipse is separated by a fortnight. The first and last eclipse in this sequence is separated by one synodic month.

Eclipse season of June–July 2094
June 13 Ascending node (new moon)	June 28 Descending node (full moon)	July 12 Ascending node (new moon)
Partial solar eclipse Solar Saros 119	Total lunar eclipse Lunar Saros 131	Partial solar eclipse Solar Saros 157

== Related eclipses ==
=== Eclipses in 2094 ===
- A partial lunar eclipse on January 1.
- A total solar eclipse on January 16.
- A partial solar eclipse on June 13.
- A total lunar eclipse on June 28.
- A partial solar eclipse on July 12.
- A partial solar eclipse on December 7.
- A total lunar eclipse on December 21.

=== Metonic ===
- Preceded by: Lunar eclipse of September 8, 2090
- Followed by: Lunar eclipse of April 15, 2098

=== Tzolkinex ===
- Preceded by: Lunar eclipse of May 17, 2087
- Followed by: Lunar eclipse of August 9, 2101

=== Half-Saros ===
- Preceded by: Solar eclipse of June 22, 2085
- Followed by: Solar eclipse of July 4, 2103

=== Tritos ===
- Preceded by: Lunar eclipse of July 29, 2083
- Followed by: Lunar eclipse of May 28, 2105

=== Lunar Saros 131 ===
- Preceded by: Lunar eclipse of June 17, 2076
- Followed by: Lunar eclipse of July 9, 2112

=== Inex ===
- Preceded by: Lunar eclipse of July 17, 2065
- Followed by: Lunar eclipse of June 9, 2123

=== Triad ===
- Preceded by: Lunar eclipse of August 28, 2007
- Followed by: Lunar eclipse of April 29, 2181

=== Lunar eclipses of 2092–2096 ===
This eclipse is a member of a semester series. An eclipse in a semester series of lunar eclipses repeats approximately every 177 days and 4 hours (a semester) at alternating nodes of the Moon's orbit.

The penumbral lunar eclipses on February 23, 2092 and August 17, 2092 occur in the previous lunar year eclipse set, and the penumbral lunar eclipses on May 7, 2096 and October 31, 2096 occur in the next lunar year eclipse set.

Lunar eclipse series sets from 2092 to 2096
Descending node				Ascending node			
Saros	Date Viewing	Type Chart	Gamma	Saros	Date Viewing	Type Chart	Gamma
111	2092 Jul 19	Penumbral	1.5131	116	2093 Jan 12	Penumbral	−1.1733
121	2093 Jul 08	Partial	0.7632	126	2094 Jan 01	Partial	−0.5024
131	2094 Jun 28	Total	0.0288	136	2094 Dec 21	Total	0.2016
141	2095 Jun 17	Partial	−0.7653	146	2095 Dec 11	Partial	0.8742
151	2096 Jun 06	Penumbral	−1.5723	156	2096 Nov 29	Penumbral	1.5017

=== Saros 131 ===
This eclipse is a part of Saros series 131, repeating every 18 years, 11 days, and containing 72 events. The series started with a penumbral lunar eclipse on May 10, 1427. It contains partial eclipses from July 25, 1553 through March 22, 1932; total eclipses from April 2, 1950 through September 3, 2202; and a second set of partial eclipses from September 13, 2220 through April 9, 2563. The series ends at member 72 as a penumbral eclipse on July 7, 2707.

The longest duration of totality will be produced by member 38 at 100 minutes, 36 seconds on June 28, 2094. All eclipses in this series occur at the Moon’s descending node of orbit.

Greatest	First			
The greatest eclipse of the series will occur on 2094 Jun 28, lasting 100 minutes, 36 seconds.	Penumbral	Partial	Total	Central
The greatest eclipse of the series will occur on 2094 Jun 28, lasting 100 minutes, 36 seconds.	1427 May 10	1553 Jul 25	1950 Apr 02	2022 May 16
The greatest eclipse of the series will occur on 2094 Jun 28, lasting 100 minutes, 36 seconds.	Last			
The greatest eclipse of the series will occur on 2094 Jun 28, lasting 100 minutes, 36 seconds.	Central	Total	Partial	Penumbral
The greatest eclipse of the series will occur on 2094 Jun 28, lasting 100 minutes, 36 seconds.	2148 Jul 31	2202 Sep 03	2563 Apr 09	2707 Jul 07

Eclipses are tabulated in three columns; every third eclipse in the same column is one exeligmos apart, so they all cast shadows over approximately the same parts of the Earth.

Series members 22–43 occur between 1801 and 2200:
22	23	24
1806 Jan 05	1824 Jan 16	1842 Jan 26
25	26	27
1860 Feb 07	1878 Feb 17	1896 Feb 28
28	29	30
1914 Mar 12	1932 Mar 22	1950 Apr 02
31	32	33
1968 Apr 13	1986 Apr 24	2004 May 04
34	35	36
2022 May 16	2040 May 26	2058 Jun 06
37	38	39
2076 Jun 17	2094 Jun 28	2112 Jul 09
40	41	42
2130 Jul 21	2148 Jul 31	2166 Aug 11
43
2184 Aug 21

=== Tritos series ===
This eclipse is a part of a tritos cycle, repeating at alternating nodes every 135 synodic months (≈ 3986.63 days, or 11 years minus 1 month). Their appearance and longitude are irregular due to a lack of synchronization with the anomalistic month (period of perigee), but groupings of 3 tritos cycles (≈ 33 years minus 3 months) come close (≈ 434.044 anomalistic months), so eclipses are similar in these groupings.

Series members between 1801 and 2200
1810 Sep 13 (Saros 105)	1821 Aug 13 (Saros 106)	1832 Jul 12 (Saros 107)	1843 Jun 12 (Saros 108)	1854 May 12 (Saros 109)
1865 Apr 11 (Saros 110)	1876 Mar 10 (Saros 111)	1887 Feb 08 (Saros 112)	1898 Jan 08 (Saros 113)	1908 Dec 07 (Saros 114)
1919 Nov 07 (Saros 115)	1930 Oct 07 (Saros 116)	1941 Sep 05 (Saros 117)	1952 Aug 05 (Saros 118)	1963 Jul 06 (Saros 119)
1974 Jun 04 (Saros 120)	1985 May 04 (Saros 121)	1996 Apr 04 (Saros 122)	2007 Mar 03 (Saros 123)	2018 Jan 31 (Saros 124)
2028 Dec 31 (Saros 125)	2039 Nov 30 (Saros 126)	2050 Oct 30 (Saros 127)	2061 Sep 29 (Saros 128)	2072 Aug 28 (Saros 129)
2083 Jul 29 (Saros 130)	2094 Jun 28 (Saros 131)	2105 May 28 (Saros 132)	2116 Apr 27 (Saros 133)	2127 Mar 28 (Saros 134)
2138 Feb 24 (Saros 135)	2149 Jan 23 (Saros 136)	2159 Dec 24 (Saros 137)	2170 Nov 23 (Saros 138)	2181 Oct 22 (Saros 139)
2192 Sep 21 (Saros 140)

=== Inex series ===
This eclipse is a part of the long period inex cycle, repeating at alternating nodes, every 358 synodic months (≈ 10,571.95 days, or 29 years minus 20 days). Their appearance and longitude are irregular due to a lack of synchronization with the anomalistic month (period of perigee). However, groupings of 3 inex cycles (≈ 87 years minus 2 months) comes close (≈ 1,151.02 anomalistic months), so eclipses are similar in these groupings.

Series members between 1801 and 2200
1805 Jan 15 (Saros 121)	1833 Dec 26 (Saros 122)	1862 Dec 06 (Saros 123)
1891 Nov 16 (Saros 124)	1920 Oct 27 (Saros 125)	1949 Oct 07 (Saros 126)
1978 Sep 16 (Saros 127)	2007 Aug 28 (Saros 128)	2036 Aug 07 (Saros 129)
2065 Jul 17 (Saros 130)	2094 Jun 28 (Saros 131)	2123 Jun 09 (Saros 132)
2152 May 18 (Saros 133)	2181 Apr 29 (Saros 134)	

=== Half-Saros cycle ===
A lunar eclipse will be preceded and followed by solar eclipses by 9 years and 5.5 days (a half saros). This lunar eclipse is related to two annular solar eclipses of Solar Saros 138.

June 22, 2085	July 4, 2103

== See also ==
- List of lunar eclipses and List of 21st-century lunar eclipses
