= August 1989 lunar eclipse =

Total lunar eclipse August 17, 1989

- Total eclipse
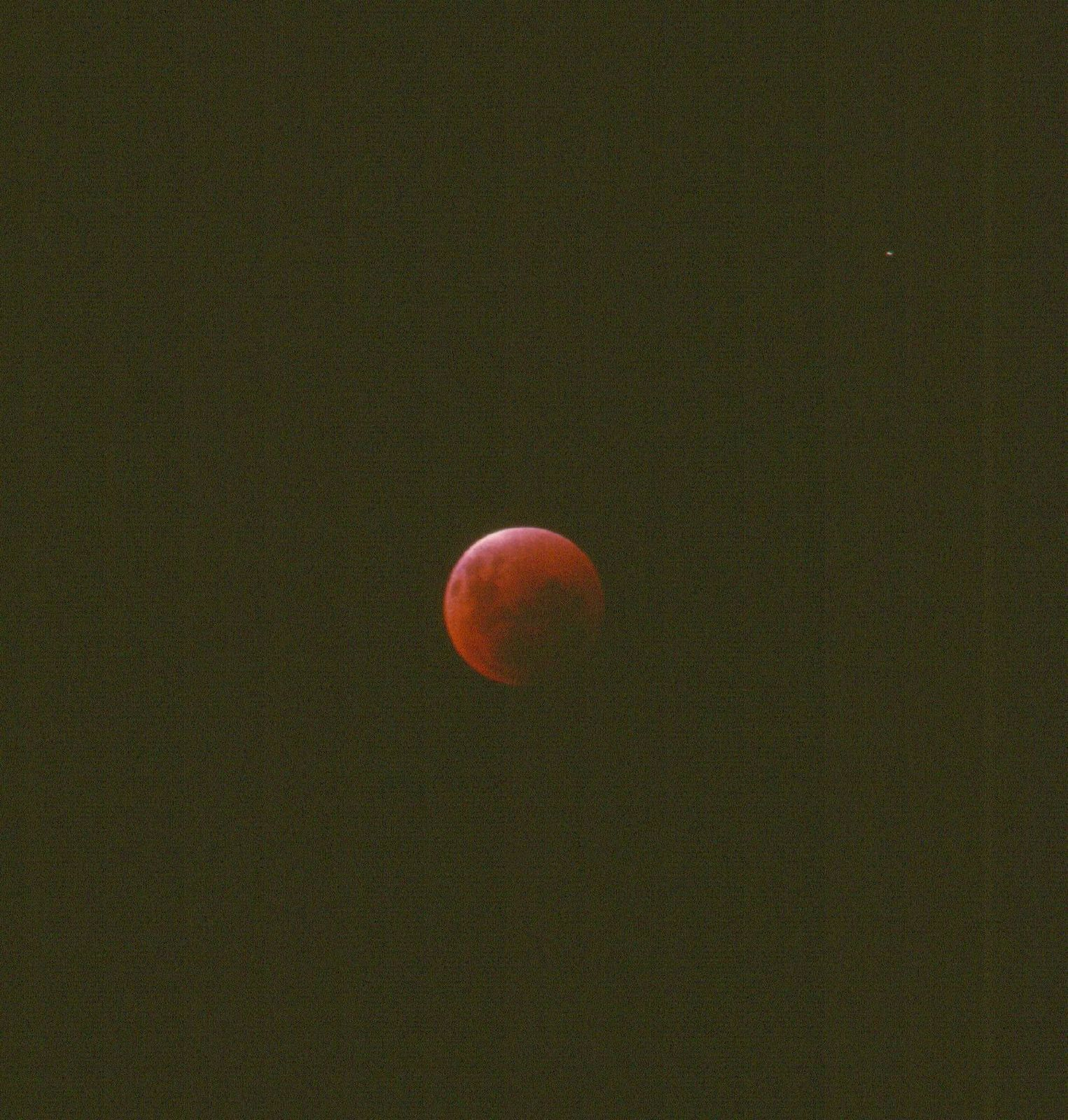
- Totality as viewed from Marden, Sussex, England.
- Date: August 17, 1989
- Gamma: −0.1491
- Magnitude: 1.5984
- Saros cycle: 128 (39 of 71)
- Totality: 95 minutes, 48 seconds
- Partiality: 214 minutes, 17 seconds
- Penumbral: 327 minutes, 31 seconds
Contacts (UTC)
- P1: 0:24:22
- U1: 1:21:03
- U2: 2:20:17
- Greatest: 3:08:11
- U3: 3:56:05
- U4: 4:55:20
- P4: 5:51:54

A total lunar eclipse occurred at the Moon’s ascending node of orbit on Thursday, August 17, 1989, with an umbral magnitude of 1.5984. It was a central lunar eclipse, in which part of the Moon passed through the center of the Earth's shadow. A lunar eclipse occurs when the Moon moves into the Earth's shadow, causing the Moon to be darkened. A total lunar eclipse occurs when the Moon's near side entirely passes into the Earth's umbral shadow. Unlike a solar eclipse, which can only be viewed from a relatively small area of the world, a lunar eclipse may be viewed from anywhere on the night side of Earth. A total lunar eclipse can last up to nearly two hours, while a total solar eclipse lasts only a few minutes at any given place, because the Moon's shadow is smaller. Occurring about 2.4 days before perigee (on August 19, 1989, at 13:30 UTC), the Moon's apparent diameter was larger.

== Visibility ==
The eclipse was completely visible over eastern North America, South America, west Africa, and Antarctica, seen rising over western and central North America and the eastern Pacific Ocean and setting over Europe, much of Africa, and west, central, and south Asia.

The Moon's hourly motion across the Earth's shadow in the constellation of Capricornus.

== Eclipse details ==
Shown below is a table displaying details about this particular lunar eclipse. It describes various parameters pertaining to this eclipse.

August 17, 1989 Lunar Eclipse Parameters
Parameter	Value
Penumbral Magnitude	2.57033
Umbral Magnitude	1.59838
Gamma	−0.14905
Sun Right Ascension	09h46m02.0s
Sun Declination	+13°27'24.4"
Sun Semi-Diameter	15'47.9"
Sun Equatorial Horizontal Parallax	08.7"
Moon Right Ascension	21h46m17.4s
Moon Declination	-13°35'27.7"
Moon Semi-Diameter	16'15.3"
Moon Equatorial Horizontal Parallax	0°59'39.3"
ΔT	56.6 s

== Eclipse season ==
This eclipse is part of an eclipse season, a period, roughly every six months, when eclipses occur. Only two (or occasionally three) eclipse seasons occur each year, and each season lasts about 35 days and repeats just short of six months (173 days) later; thus two full eclipse seasons always occur each year. Either two or three eclipses happen each eclipse season. In the sequence below, each eclipse is separated by a fortnight.

Eclipse season of August 1989
August 17 Ascending node (full moon)	August 31 Descending node (new moon)
Total lunar eclipse Lunar Saros 128	Partial solar eclipse Solar Saros 154

== Related eclipses ==
=== Eclipses in 1989 ===
- A total lunar eclipse on February 20.
- A partial solar eclipse on March 7.
- A total lunar eclipse on August 17.
- A partial solar eclipse on August 31.

=== Metonic ===
- Preceded by: Lunar eclipse of October 28, 1985
- Followed by: Lunar eclipse of June 4, 1993

=== Tzolkinex ===
- Preceded by: Lunar eclipse of July 6, 1982
- Followed by: Lunar eclipse of September 27, 1996

=== Half-Saros ===
- Preceded by: Solar eclipse of August 10, 1980
- Followed by: Solar eclipse of August 22, 1998

=== Tritos ===
- Preceded by: Lunar eclipse of September 16, 1978
- Followed by: Lunar eclipse of July 16, 2000

=== Lunar Saros 128 ===
- Preceded by: Lunar eclipse of August 6, 1971
- Followed by: Lunar eclipse of August 28, 2007

=== Inex ===
- Preceded by: Lunar eclipse of September 5, 1960
- Followed by: Lunar eclipse of July 27, 2018

=== Triad ===
- Preceded by: Lunar eclipse of October 17, 1902
- Followed by: Lunar eclipse of June 17, 2076

=== Lunar eclipses of 1988–1991 ===
This eclipse is the second of four lunar year eclipses occurring at the Moon's ascending node.

The lunar year series repeats after 12 lunations or 354 days (Shifting back about 10 days in sequential years). Because of the date shift, the Earth's shadow will be about 11 degrees west in sequential events.

This eclipse is a member of a semester series. An eclipse in a semester series of lunar eclipses repeats approximately every 177 days and 4 hours (a semester) at alternating nodes of the Moon's orbit.

The lunar eclipses on June 27, 1991 (penumbral) and December 21, 1991 (partial) occur in the next lunar year eclipse set.

Lunar eclipse series sets from 1988 to 1991
Descending node				Ascending node			
Saros	Date Viewing	Type Chart	Gamma	Saros	Date Viewing	Type Chart	Gamma
113	1988 Mar 03	Penumbral	0.9886	118	1988 Aug 27	Partial	−0.8682
123	1989 Feb 20	Total	0.2935	128	1989 Aug 17	Total	−0.1491
133	1990 Feb 09	Total	−0.4148	138	1990 Aug 06	Partial	0.6374
143	1991 Jan 30	Penumbral	−1.0752	148	1991 Jul 26	Penumbral	1.4370

=== Metonic series ===
It is the third of five Metonic cycle eclipses, each being separated by 19 years: The Metonic cycle repeats nearly exactly every 19 years and represents a Saros cycle plus one lunar year. Because it occurs on the same calendar date, the Earth's shadow will in nearly the same location relative to the background stars.

Metonic lunar eclipse sets 1951–2027
Descending node			Ascending node		
Saros	Date	Type	Saros	Date	Type
103	1951 Feb 21.88	Penumbral	108	1951 Aug 17.13	Penumbral
113	1970 Feb 21.35	Partial	118	1970 Aug 17.14	Partial
123	1989 Feb 20.64	Total	128	1989 Aug 17.13	Total
133	2008 Feb 21.14	Total	138	2008 Aug 16.88	Partial
143	2027 Feb 20.96	Penumbral	148	2027 Aug 17.30	Penumbral

=== Saros 128 ===
This eclipse is a part of Saros series 128, repeating every 18 years, 11 days, and containing 71 events. The series started with a penumbral lunar eclipse on June 18, 1304. It contains partial eclipses from September 2, 1430 through May 11, 1827; total eclipses from May 21, 1845 through October 21, 2097; and a second set of partial eclipses from November 2, 2115 through May 17, 2440. The series ends at member 71 as a penumbral eclipse on August 2, 2566.

The longest duration of totality was produced by member 37 at 100 minutes, 43 seconds on July 26, 1953. All eclipses in this series occur at the Moon’s ascending node of orbit.

Greatest	First			
The greatest eclipse of the series occurred on 1953 Jul 26, lasting 100 minutes, 43 seconds.	Penumbral	Partial	Total	Central
The greatest eclipse of the series occurred on 1953 Jul 26, lasting 100 minutes, 43 seconds.	1304 Jun 18	1430 Sep 02	1845 May 21	1899 Jun 23
The greatest eclipse of the series occurred on 1953 Jul 26, lasting 100 minutes, 43 seconds.	Last			
The greatest eclipse of the series occurred on 1953 Jul 26, lasting 100 minutes, 43 seconds.	Central	Total	Partial	Penumbral
The greatest eclipse of the series occurred on 1953 Jul 26, lasting 100 minutes, 43 seconds.	2007 Aug 28	2097 Oct 21	2440 May 17	2566 Aug 02

Eclipses are tabulated in three columns; every third eclipse in the same column is one exeligmos apart, so they all cast shadows over approximately the same parts of the Earth.

Series members 29–50 occur between 1801 and 2200:
29	30	31
1809 Apr 30	1827 May 11	1845 May 21
32	33	34
1863 Jun 01	1881 Jun 12	1899 Jun 23
35	36	37
1917 Jul 04	1935 Jul 16	1953 Jul 26
38	39	40
1971 Aug 06	1989 Aug 17	2007 Aug 28
41	42	43
2025 Sep 07	2043 Sep 19	2061 Sep 29
44	45	46
2079 Oct 10	2097 Oct 21	2115 Nov 02
47	48	49
2133 Nov 12	2151 Nov 24	2169 Dec 04
50
2187 Dec 15

=== Tritos series ===
This eclipse is a part of a tritos cycle, repeating at alternating nodes every 135 synodic months (≈ 3986.63 days, or 11 years minus 1 month). Their appearance and longitude are irregular due to a lack of synchronization with the anomalistic month (period of perigee), but groupings of 3 tritos cycles (≈ 33 years minus 3 months) come close (≈ 434.044 anomalistic months), so eclipses are similar in these groupings.

Series members between 1801 and 2200
1804 Jan 26 (Saros 111)	1814 Dec 26 (Saros 112)	1825 Nov 25 (Saros 113)	1836 Oct 24 (Saros 114)	1847 Sep 24 (Saros 115)
1858 Aug 24 (Saros 116)	1869 Jul 23 (Saros 117)	1880 Jun 22 (Saros 118)	1891 May 23 (Saros 119)	1902 Apr 22 (Saros 120)
1913 Mar 22 (Saros 121)	1924 Feb 20 (Saros 122)	1935 Jan 19 (Saros 123)	1945 Dec 19 (Saros 124)	1956 Nov 18 (Saros 125)
1967 Oct 18 (Saros 126)	1978 Sep 16 (Saros 127)	1989 Aug 17 (Saros 128)	2000 Jul 16 (Saros 129)	2011 Jun 15 (Saros 130)
2022 May 16 (Saros 131)	2033 Apr 14 (Saros 132)	2044 Mar 13 (Saros 133)	2055 Feb 11 (Saros 134)	2066 Jan 11 (Saros 135)
2076 Dec 10 (Saros 136)	2087 Nov 10 (Saros 137)	2098 Oct 10 (Saros 138)	2109 Sep 09 (Saros 139)	2120 Aug 09 (Saros 140)
2131 Jul 10 (Saros 141)	2142 Jun 08 (Saros 142)	2153 May 08 (Saros 143)	2164 Apr 07 (Saros 144)	2175 Mar 07 (Saros 145)
2186 Feb 04 (Saros 146)	2197 Jan 04 (Saros 147)			

=== Inex series ===
This eclipse is a part of the long period inex cycle, repeating at alternating nodes, every 358 synodic months (≈ 10,571.95 days, or 29 years minus 20 days). Their appearance and longitude are irregular due to a lack of synchronization with the anomalistic month (period of perigee). However, groupings of 3 inex cycles (≈ 87 years minus 2 months) comes close (≈ 1,151.02 anomalistic months), so eclipses are similar in these groupings.

Series members between 1801 and 2200
1815 Dec 16 (Saros 122)	1844 Nov 24 (Saros 123)	1873 Nov 04 (Saros 124)
1902 Oct 17 (Saros 125)	1931 Sep 26 (Saros 126)	1960 Sep 05 (Saros 127)
1989 Aug 17 (Saros 128)	2018 Jul 27 (Saros 129)	2047 Jul 07 (Saros 130)
2076 Jun 17 (Saros 131)	2105 May 28 (Saros 132)	2134 May 08 (Saros 133)
2163 Apr 19 (Saros 134)	2192 Mar 28 (Saros 135)	

=== Half-Saros cycle ===
A lunar eclipse will be preceded and followed by solar eclipses by 9 years and 5.5 days (a half saros). This lunar eclipse is related to two annular solar eclipses of Solar Saros 135.

August 10, 1980	August 22, 1998

== See also ==
- List of lunar eclipses
- List of 20th-century lunar eclipses
