= June 2011 lunar eclipse =

Central lunar eclipse

- Total eclipse
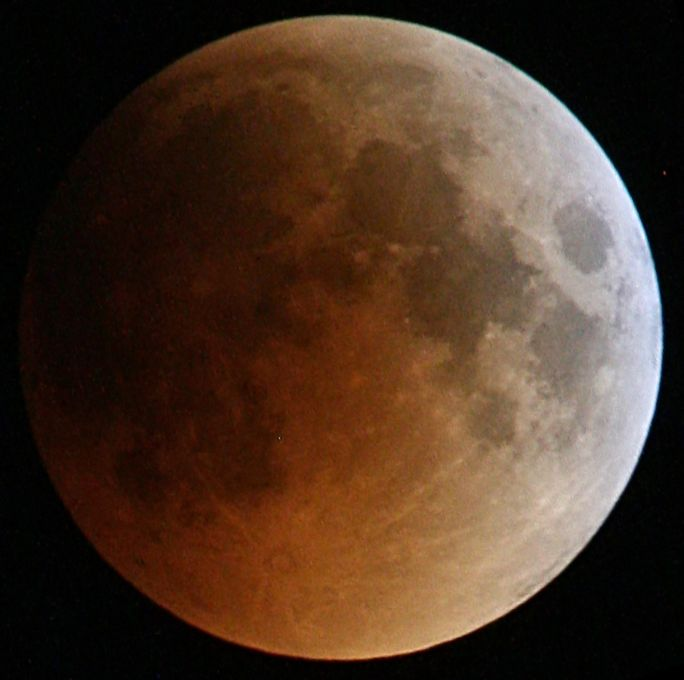
- Totality as viewed from Dar es Salaam, Tanzania, 19:28 UTC
- Date: June 15, 2011
- Gamma: 0.0897
- Magnitude: 1.7014
- Saros cycle: 130 (34 of 72)
- Totality: 100 minutes, 13 seconds
- Partiality: 219 minutes, 17 seconds
- Penumbral: 336 minutes, 4 seconds
Contacts (UTC)
- P1: 17:24:37
- U1: 18:22:57
- U2: 19:22:29
- Greatest: 20:12:36
- U3: 21:02:42
- U4: 22:02:14
- P4: 23:00:41

A total lunar eclipse occurred at the Moon’s ascending node of orbit on Wednesday, June 15, 2011, with an umbral magnitude of 1.7014. It was a central lunar eclipse, in which part of the Moon passed through the center of the Earth's shadow. A lunar eclipse occurs when the Moon moves into the Earth's shadow, causing the Moon to be darkened. A total lunar eclipse occurs when the Moon's near side entirely passes into the Earth's umbral shadow. Unlike a solar eclipse, which can only be viewed from a relatively small area of the world, a lunar eclipse may be viewed from anywhere on the night side of Earth. A total lunar eclipse can last up to nearly two hours, while a total solar eclipse lasts only a few minutes at any given place, because the Moon's shadow is smaller. Occurring about 4.1 days after perigee (on June 11, 2011, at 21:40 UTC), the Moon's apparent diameter was larger.

The last time a lunar eclipse was closer to the center of the Earth's shadow was on July 16, 2000. The next central total lunar eclipse occurred on July 27, 2018.

== Visibility and viewing ==
The eclipse was completely visible over east Africa, Antarctica, and west, central, and south Asia, seen rising over Europe, west Africa, and South America and setting over east Asia and Australia.

In western Asia, Australia, and the Philippines, the lunar eclipse was visible just before sunrise. It was very visible in the clear and cloudless night sky throughout eastern and southeast Asia. Africa, far eastern Russia and Europe witnessed the whole event even in the late stages (as in partial lunar eclipse). The Americas (including North and northwestern South America) missed the eclipse completely (except in most areas) because it occurred at moonset.

Hourly motion shown right to left	The Moon's hourly motion across the Earth's shadow in the constellation of Ophiuchus (north of Scorpius).
Visibility map

== Images ==
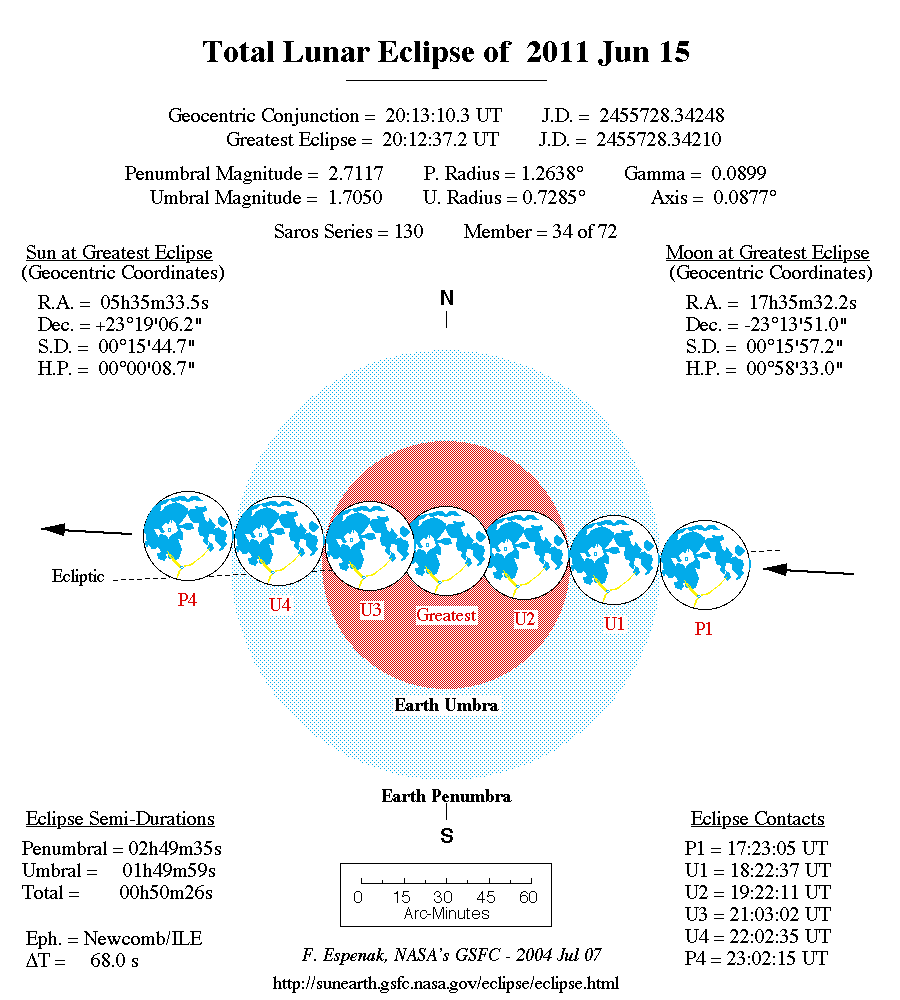
NASA chart of the eclipse

== Gallery ==
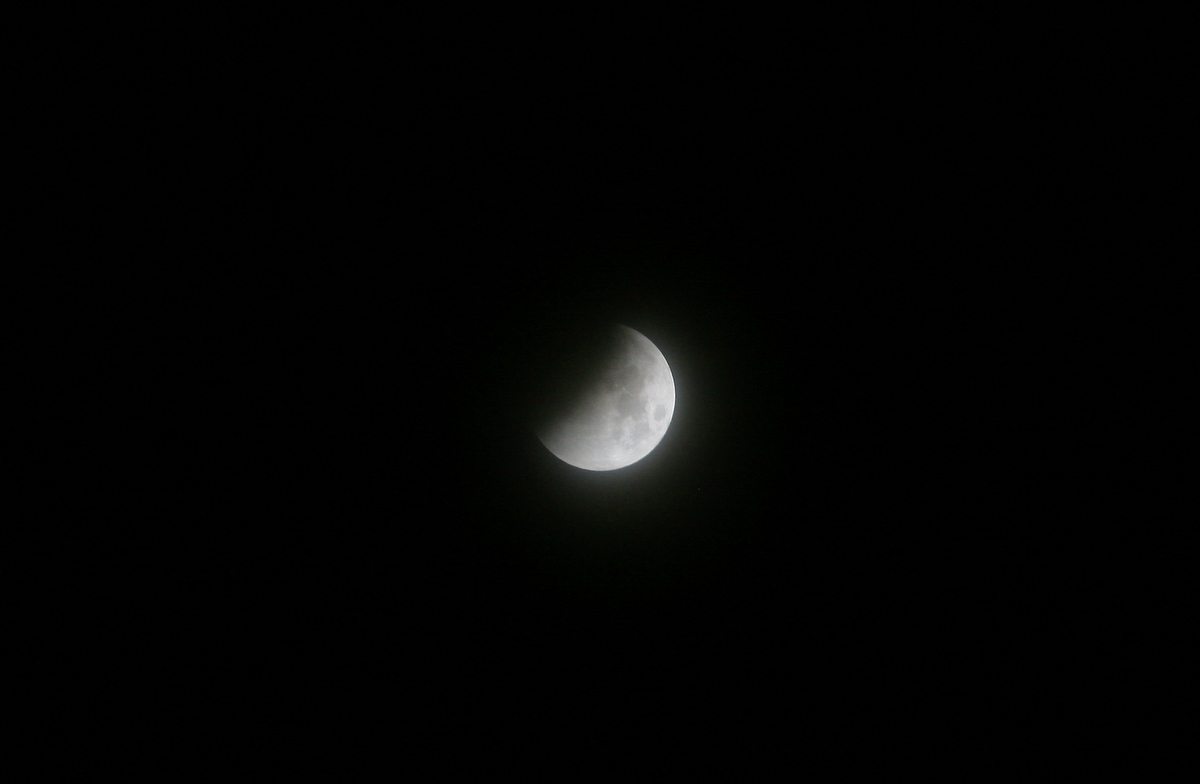
Macau, 18:43 UTC

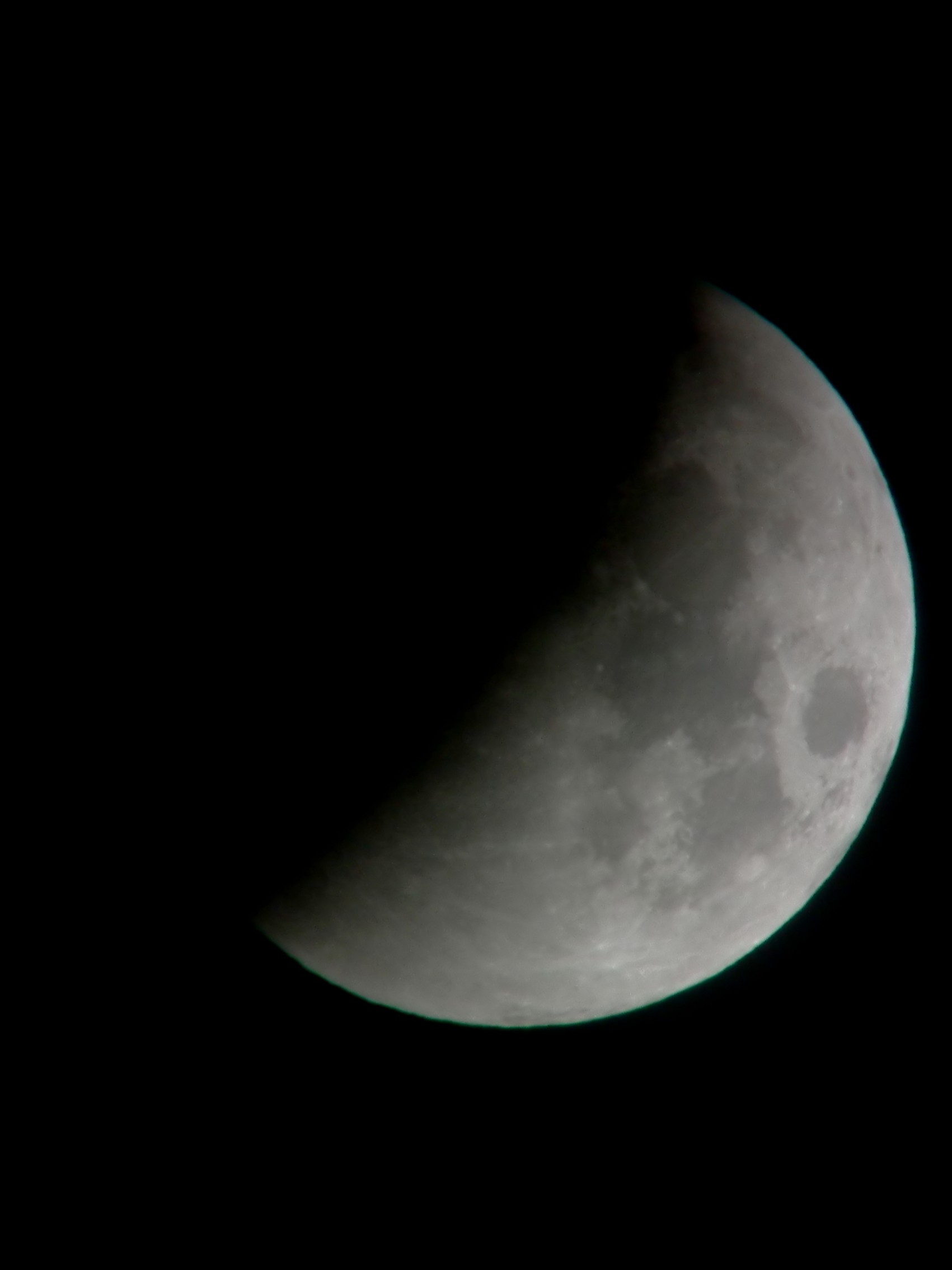
Hong Kong, 18:47 UTC

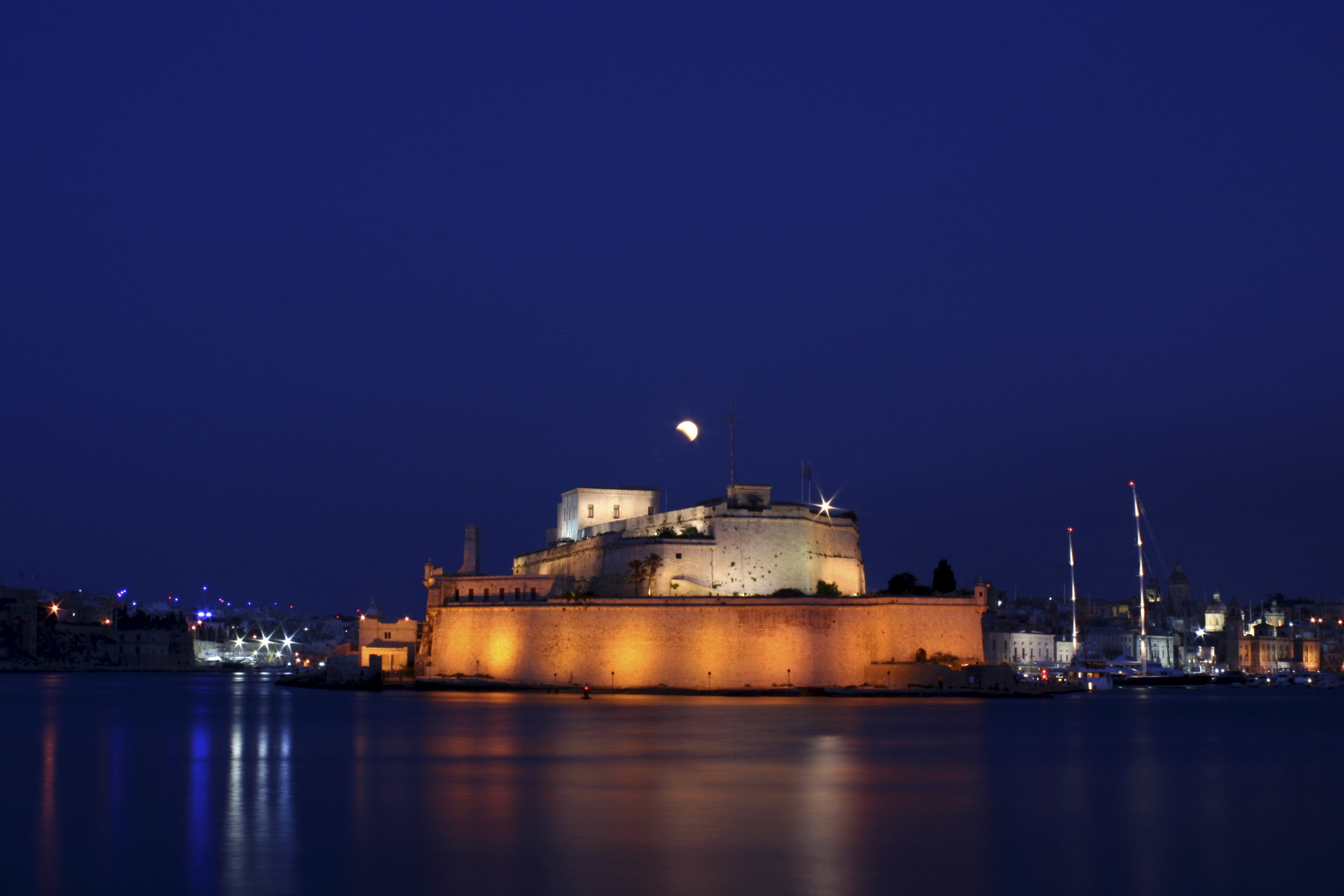
Vittoriosa, Malta, 18:52 UTC

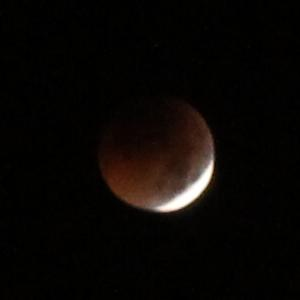
Makati, Philippines, 19:21 UTC

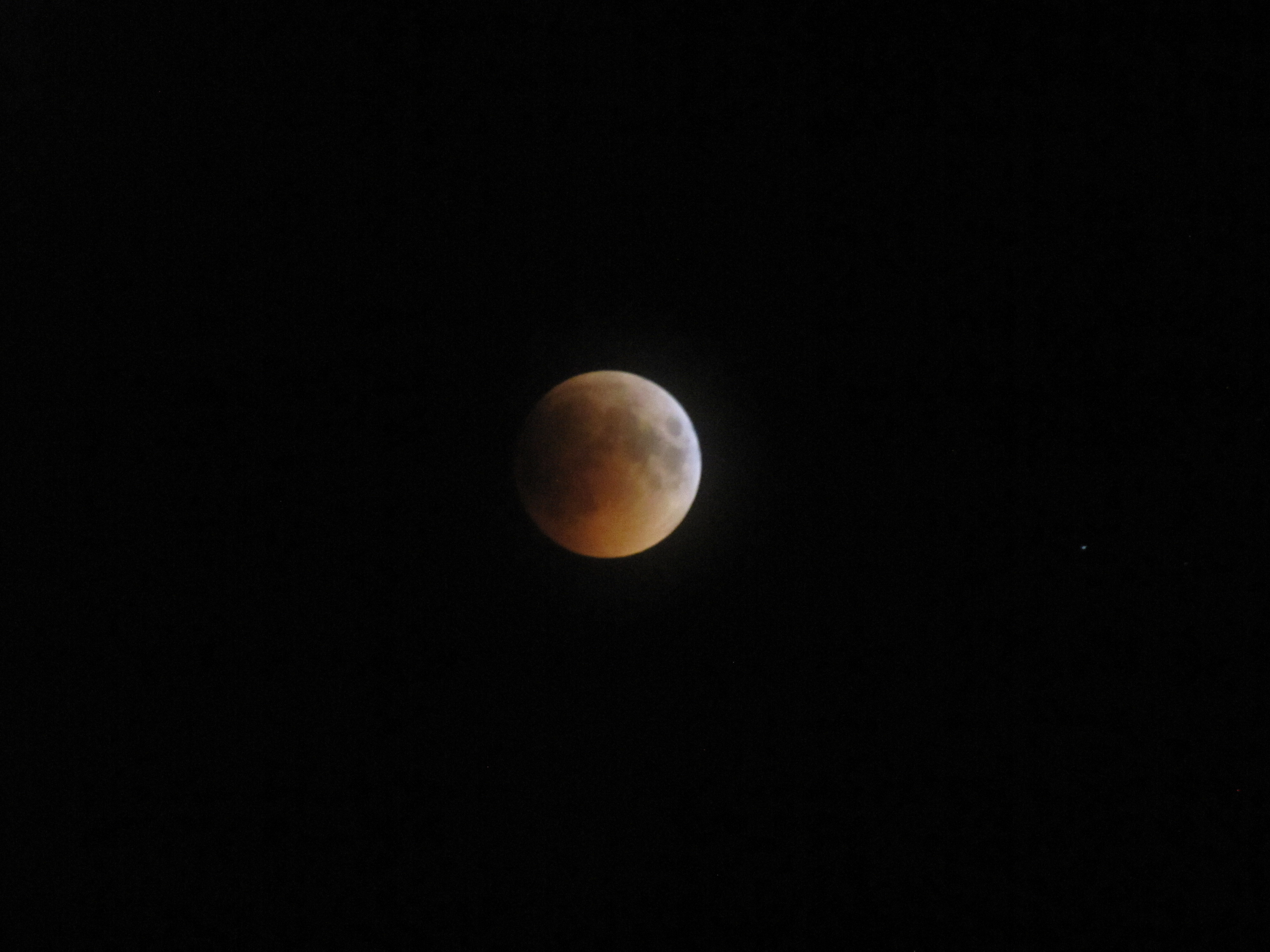
Mangalore, India, 19:32 UTC

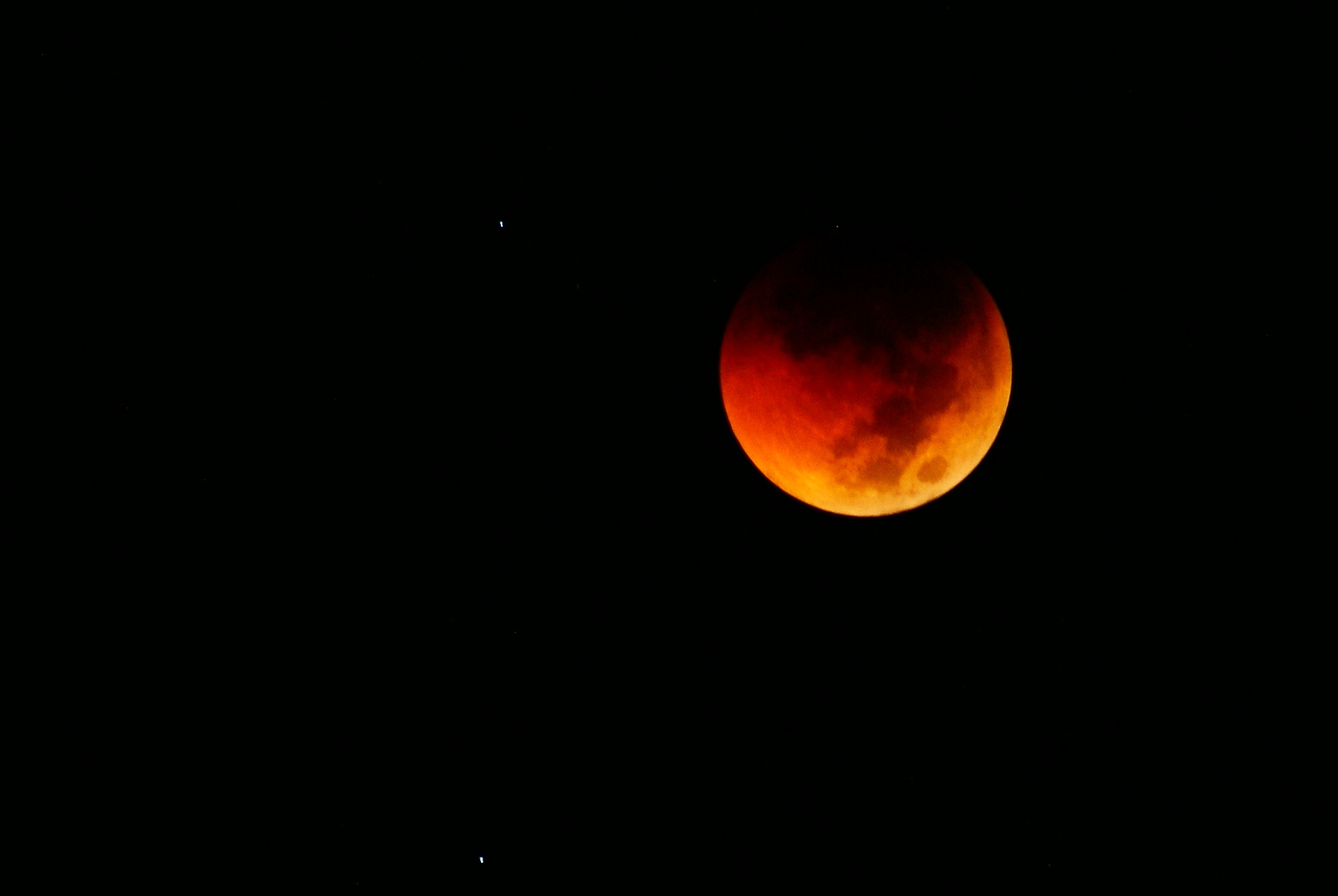
Dompu, Indonesia, 19:35 UTC

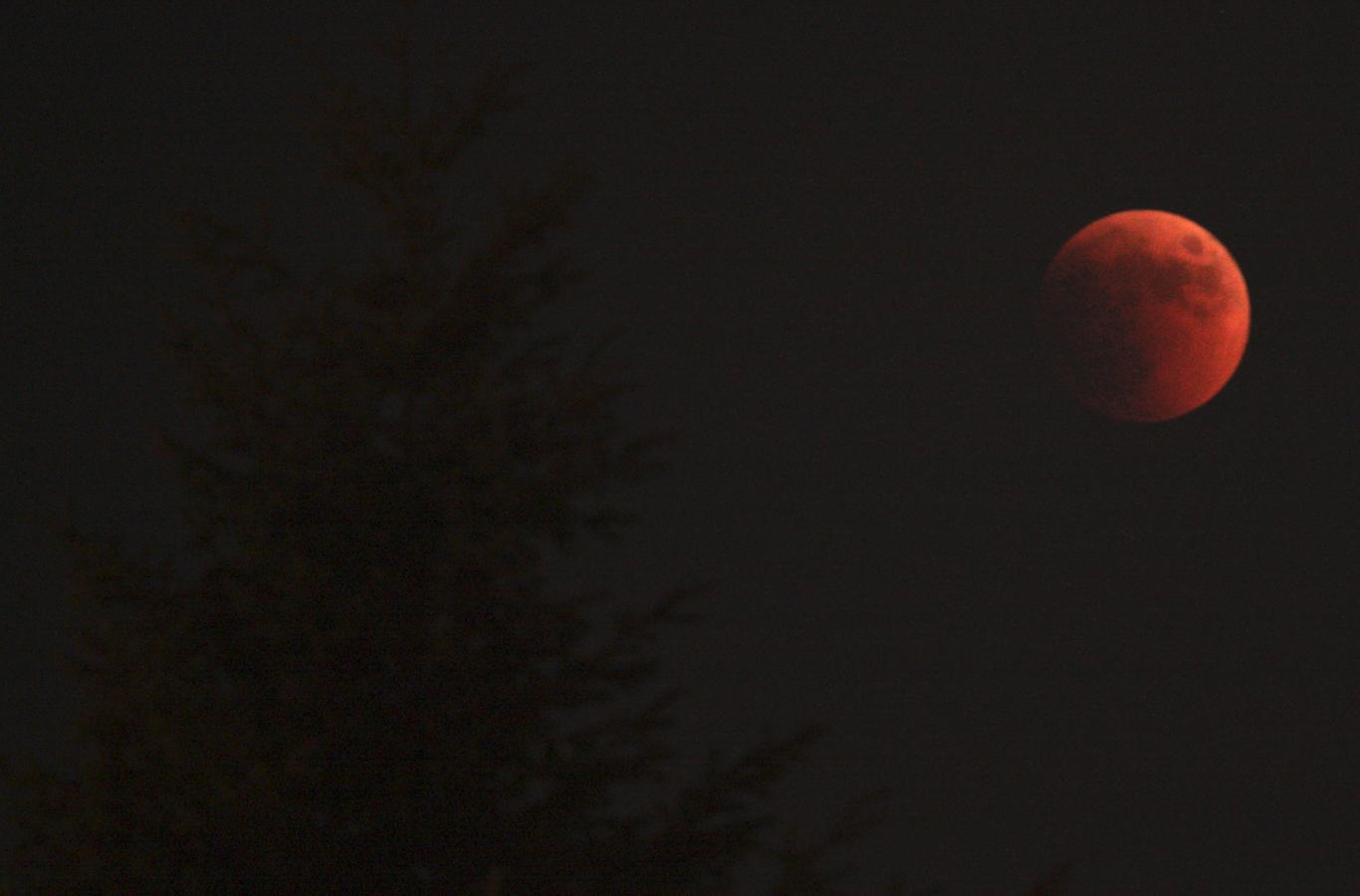
Sofia, Bulgaria, 19:42 UTC

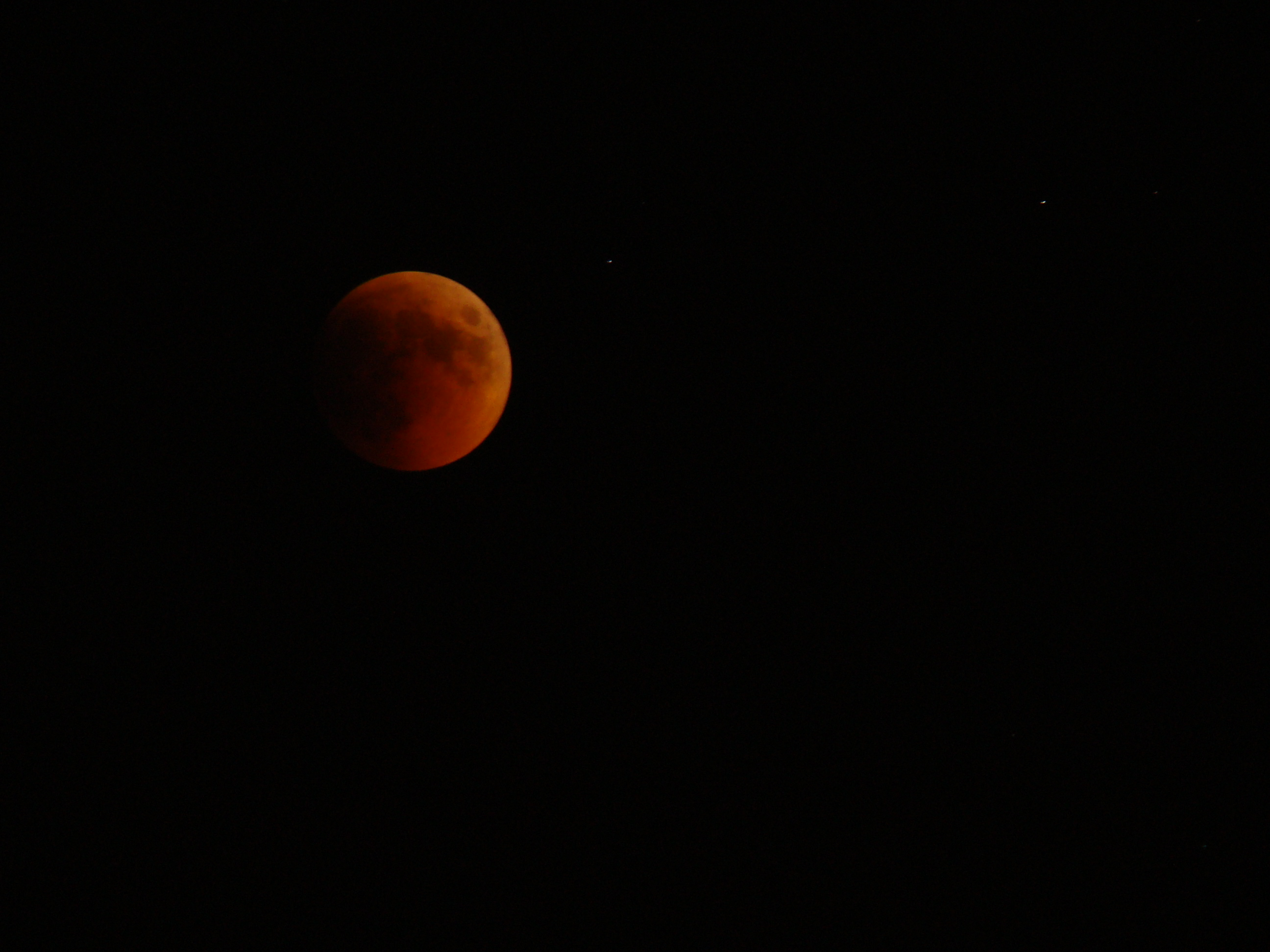
Tehran, Iran, 19:44 UTC

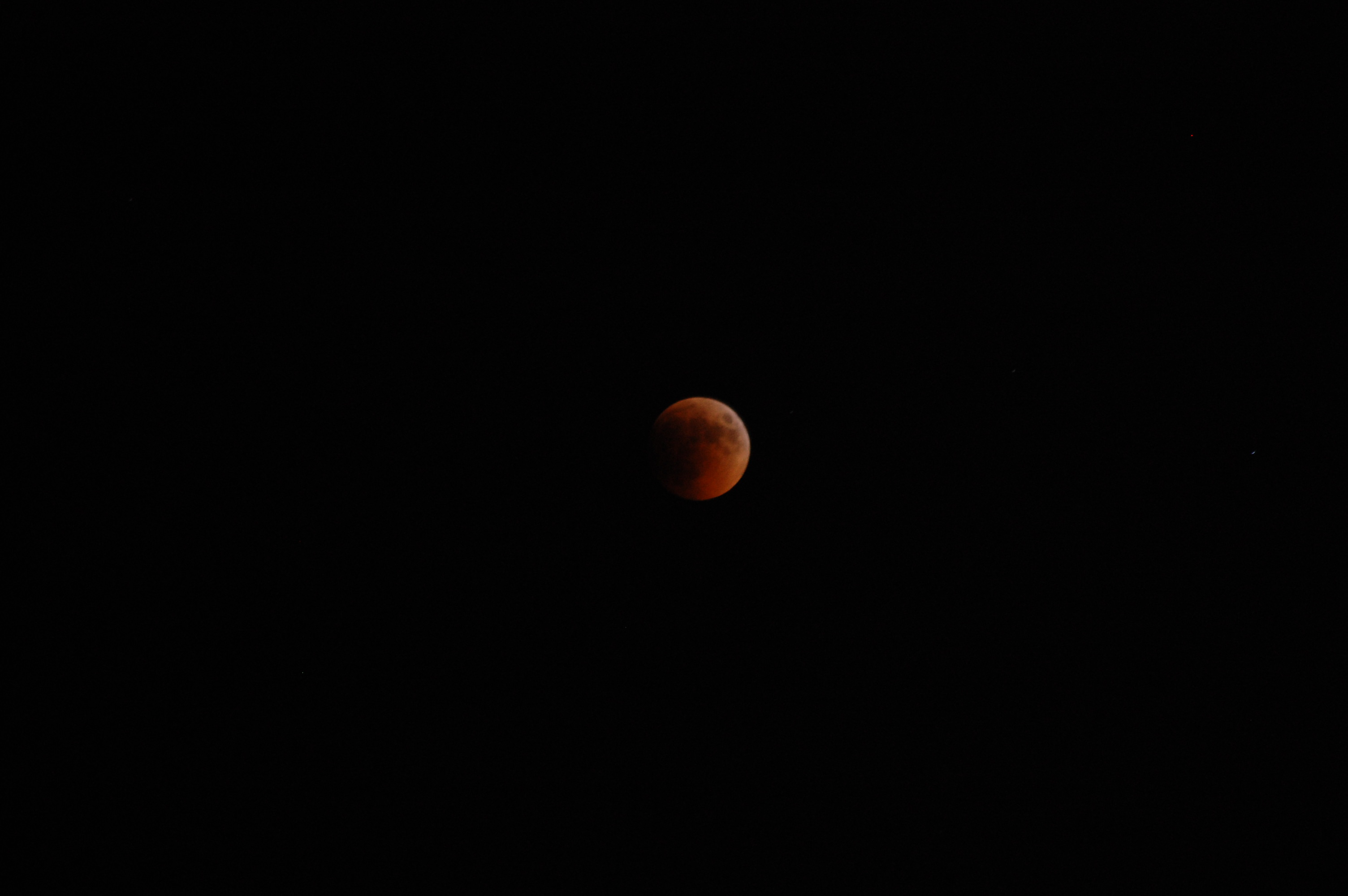
Abu Dhabi, U.A.E., 19:53 UTC

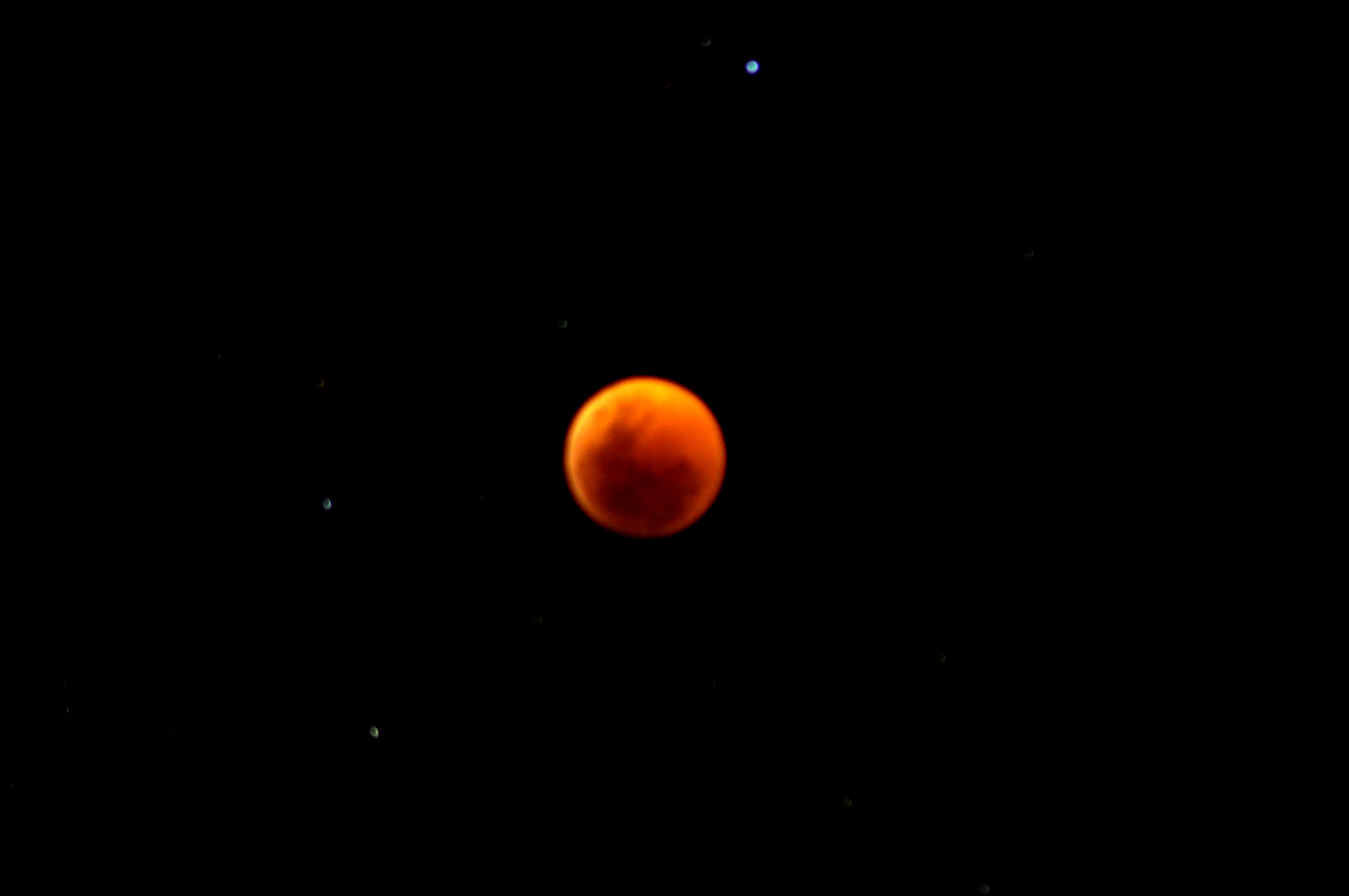
Johannesburg, South Africa, 22:03 UTC

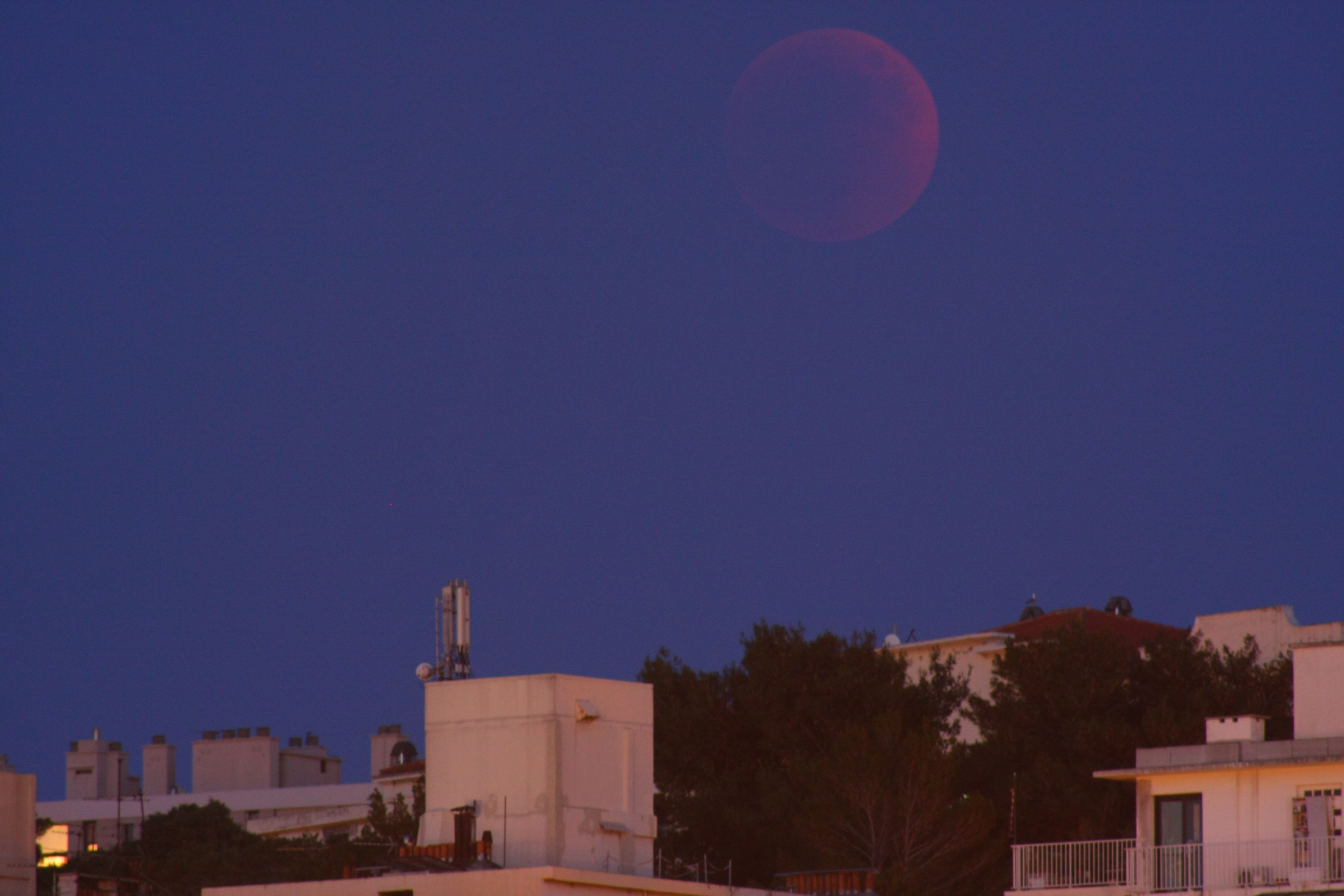
Marseille, France, 20:07 UTC

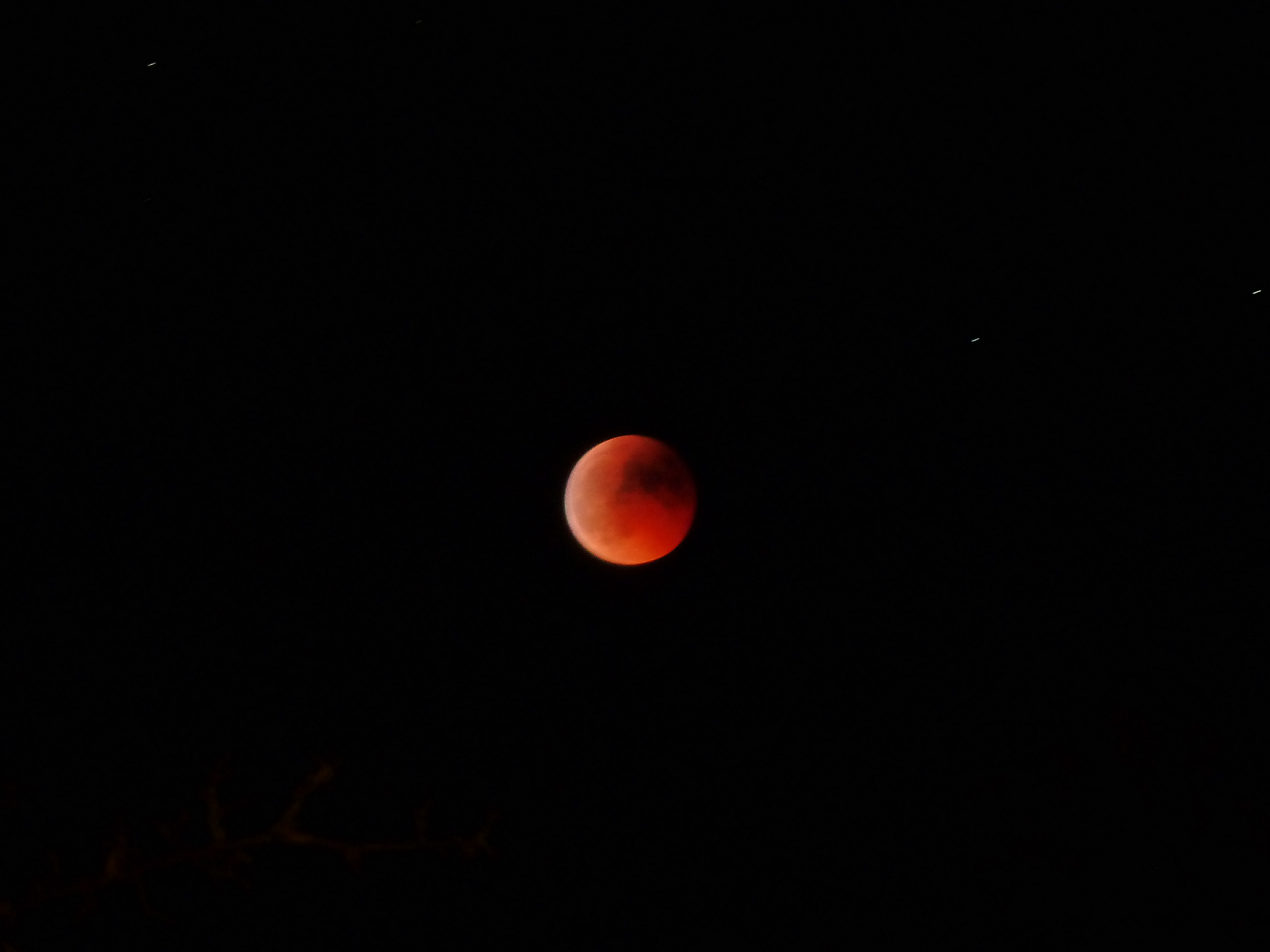
Slovenska Bistrica, Slovenia, 20:58 UTC

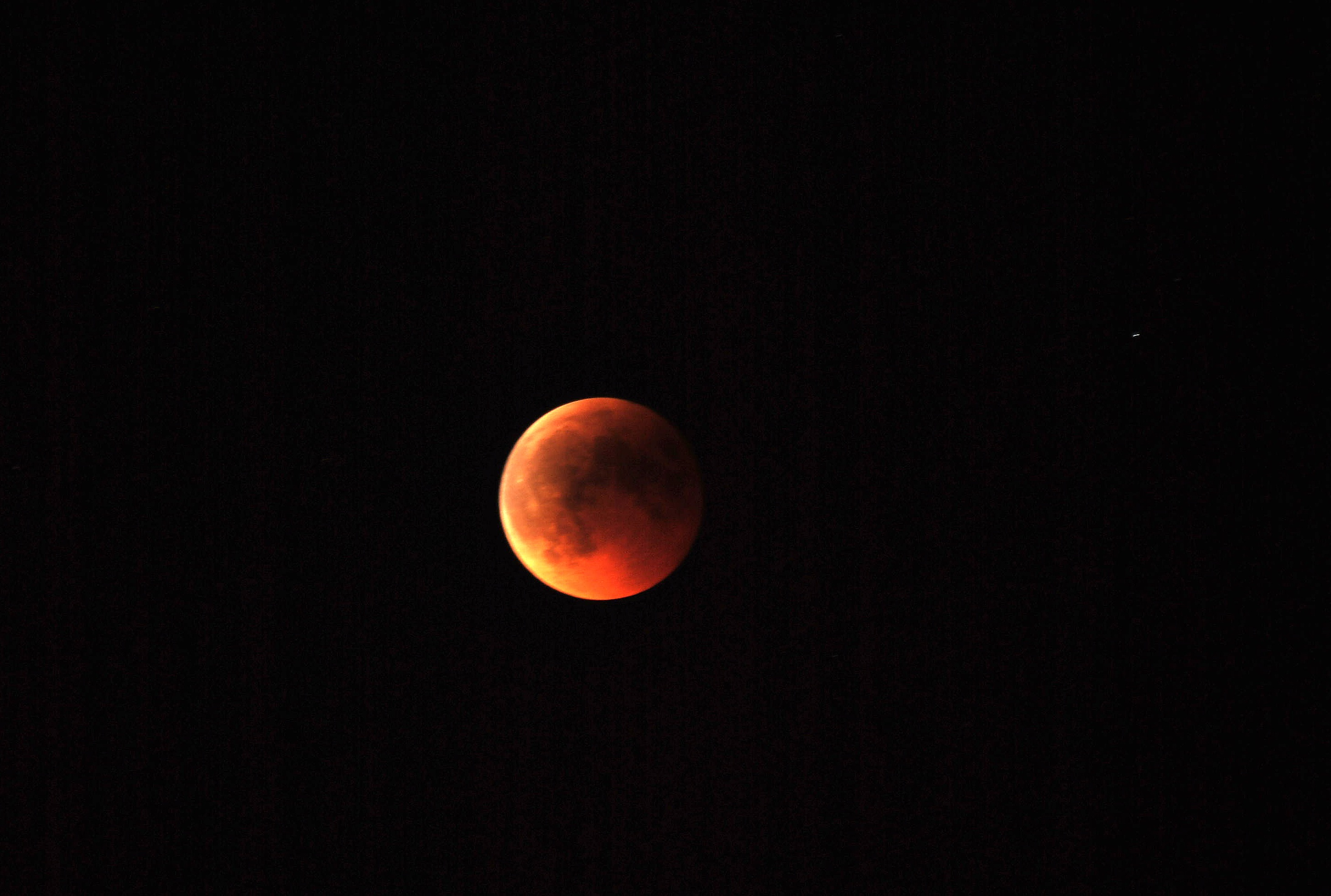
Deva, Romania, 21:01 UTC

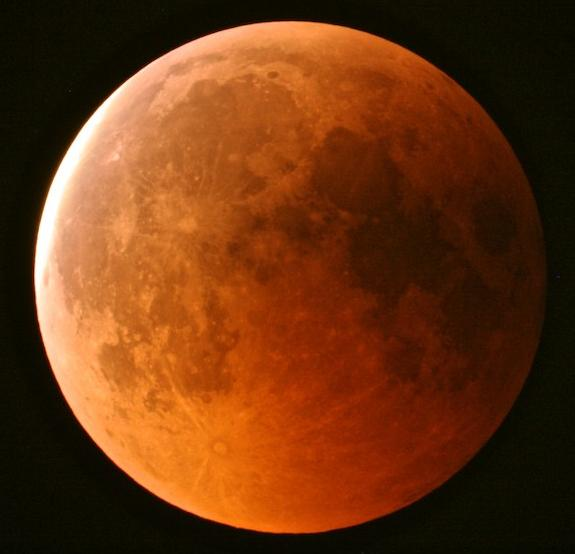
Palermo, Italy, 21:04 UTC

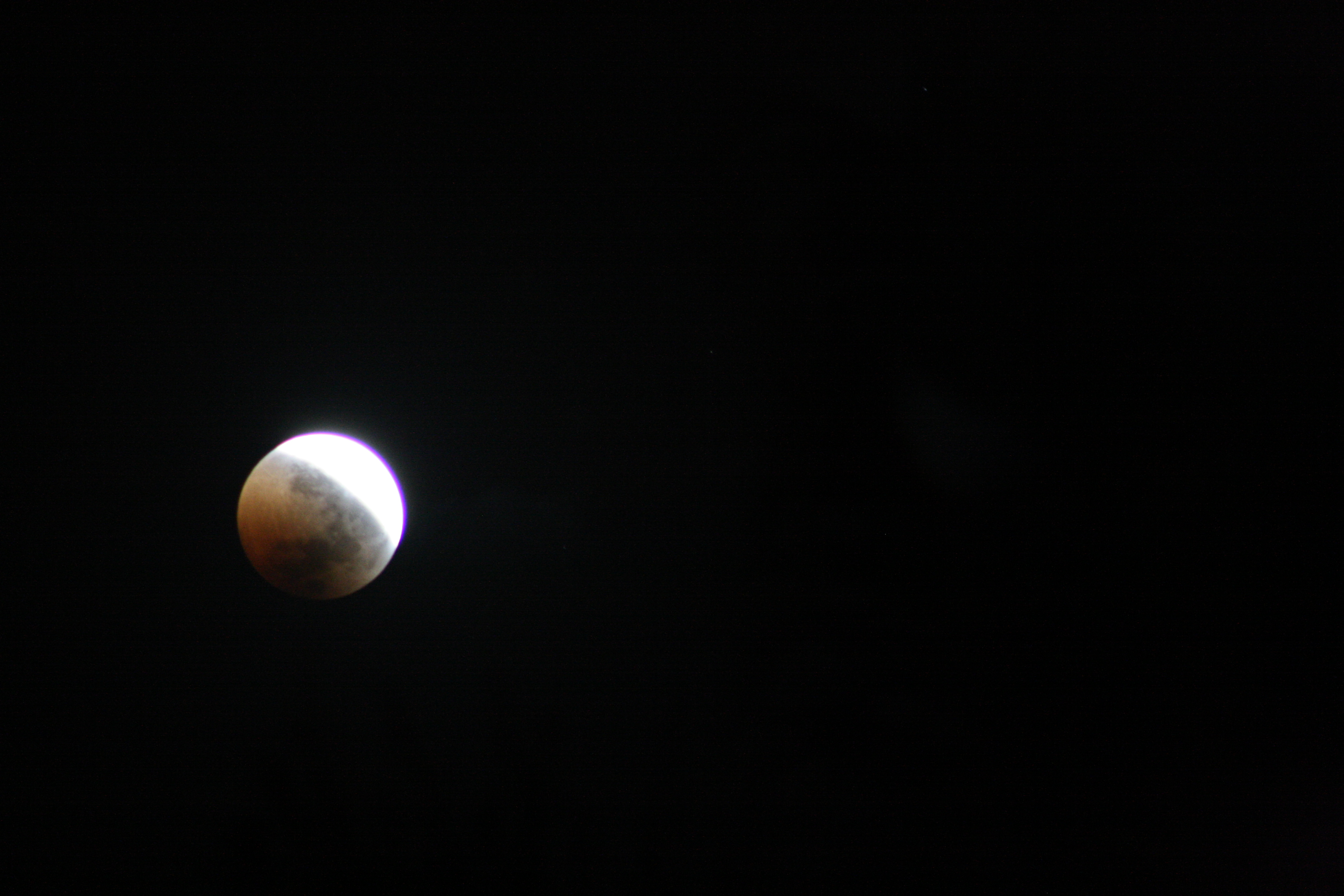
Perth, Australia, ~21:10 UTC

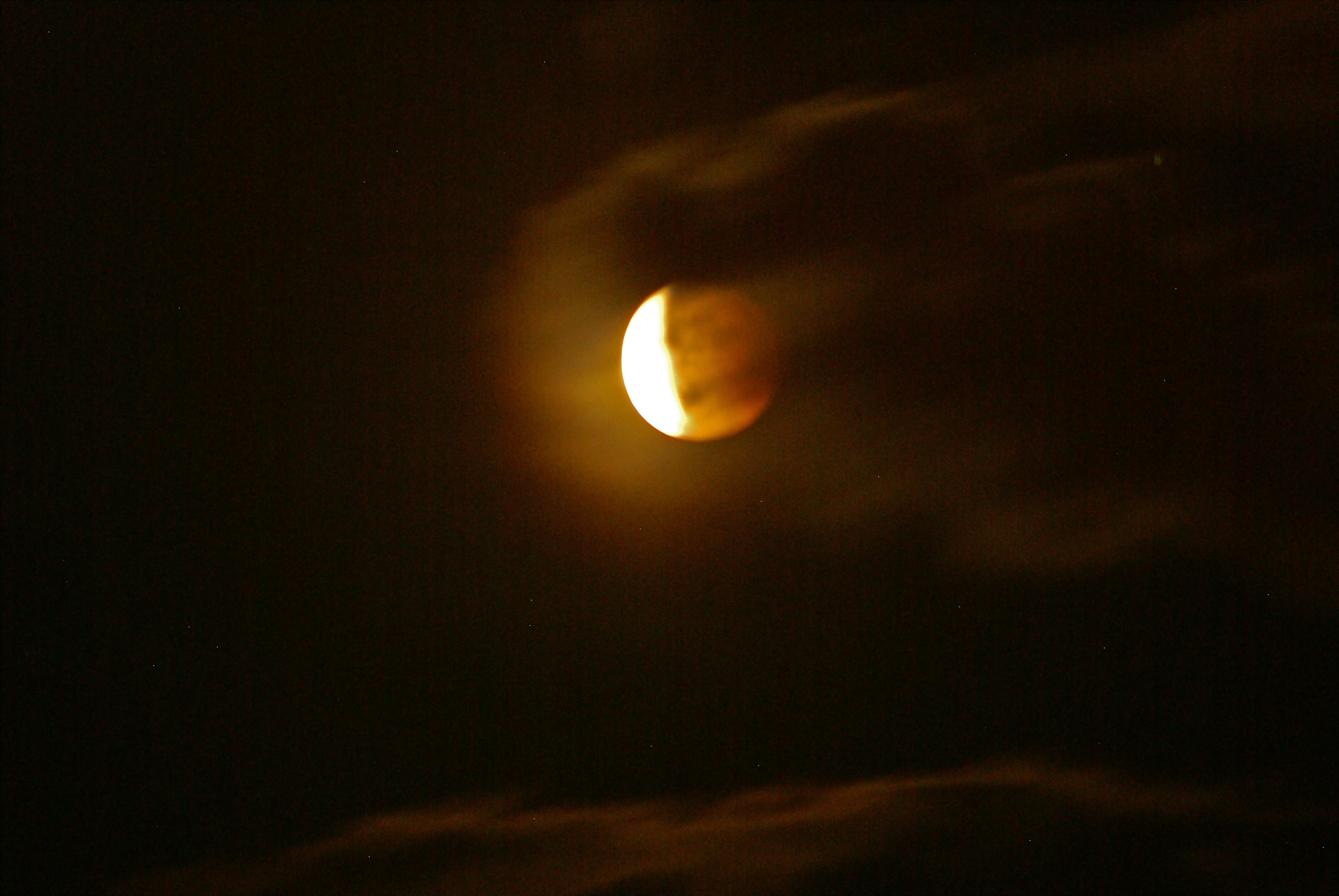
Germering, Germany, 21:22 UTC

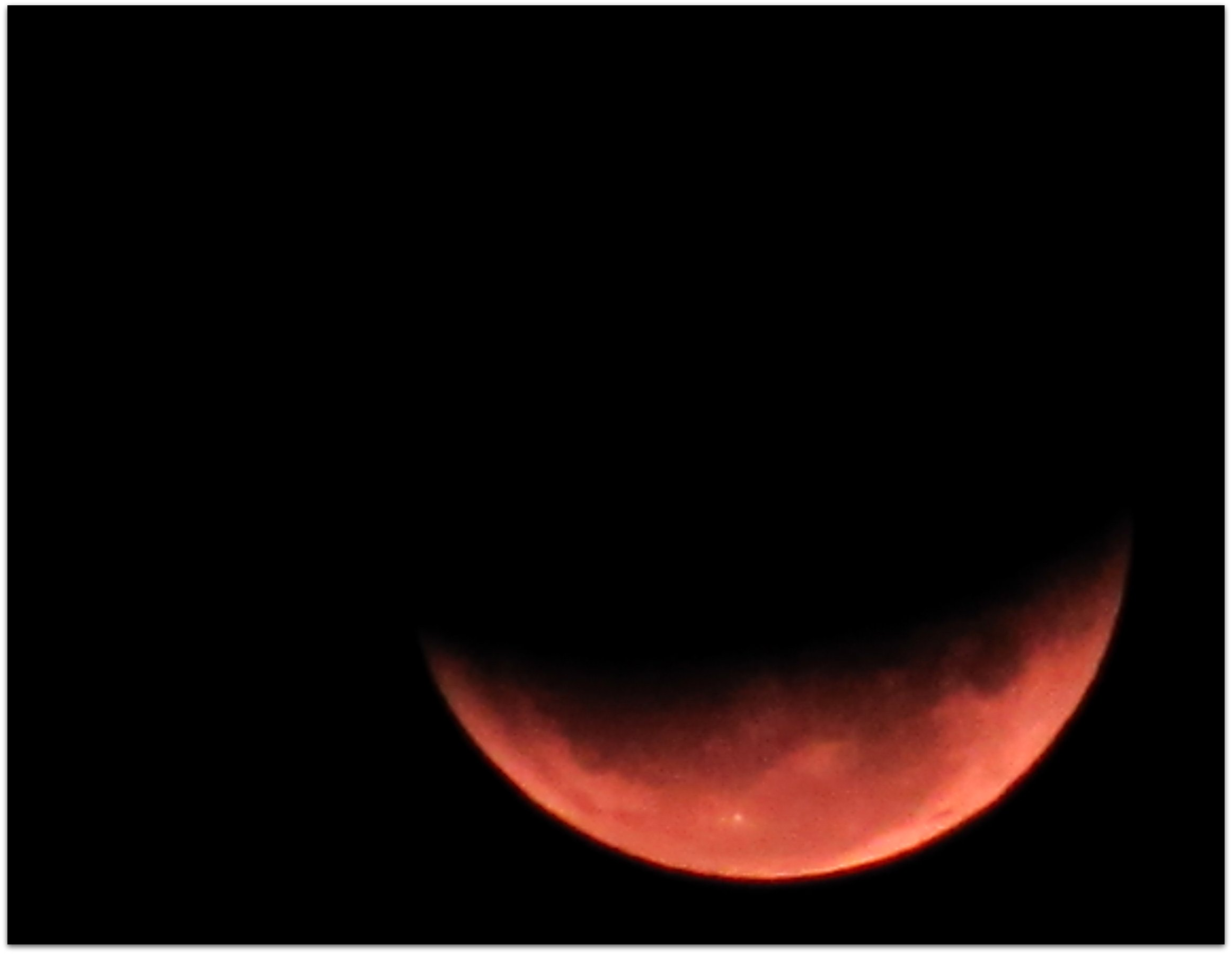
Salto, São Paulo, 21:23 UTC

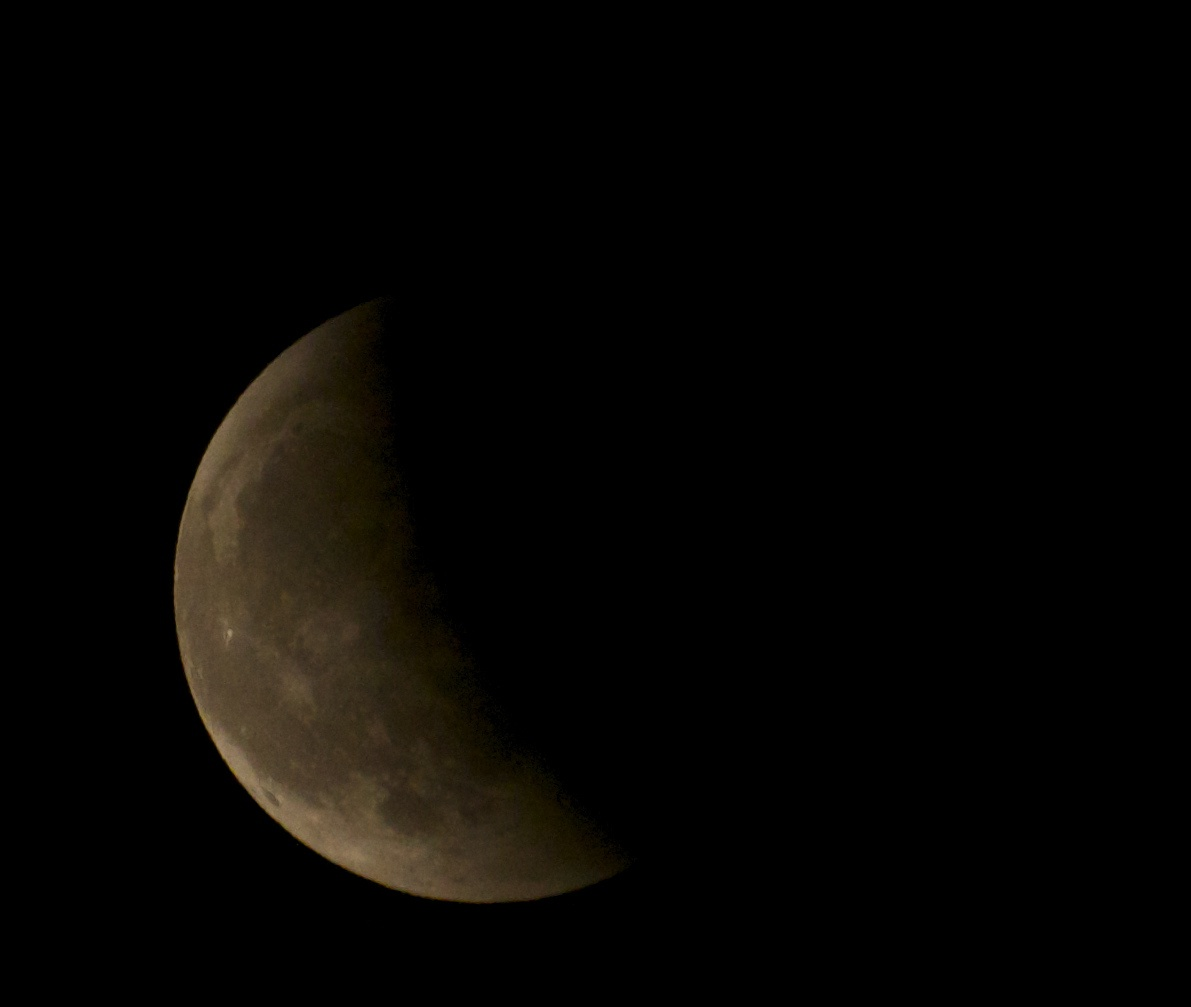
Lisbon, Portugal, 21:35 UTC

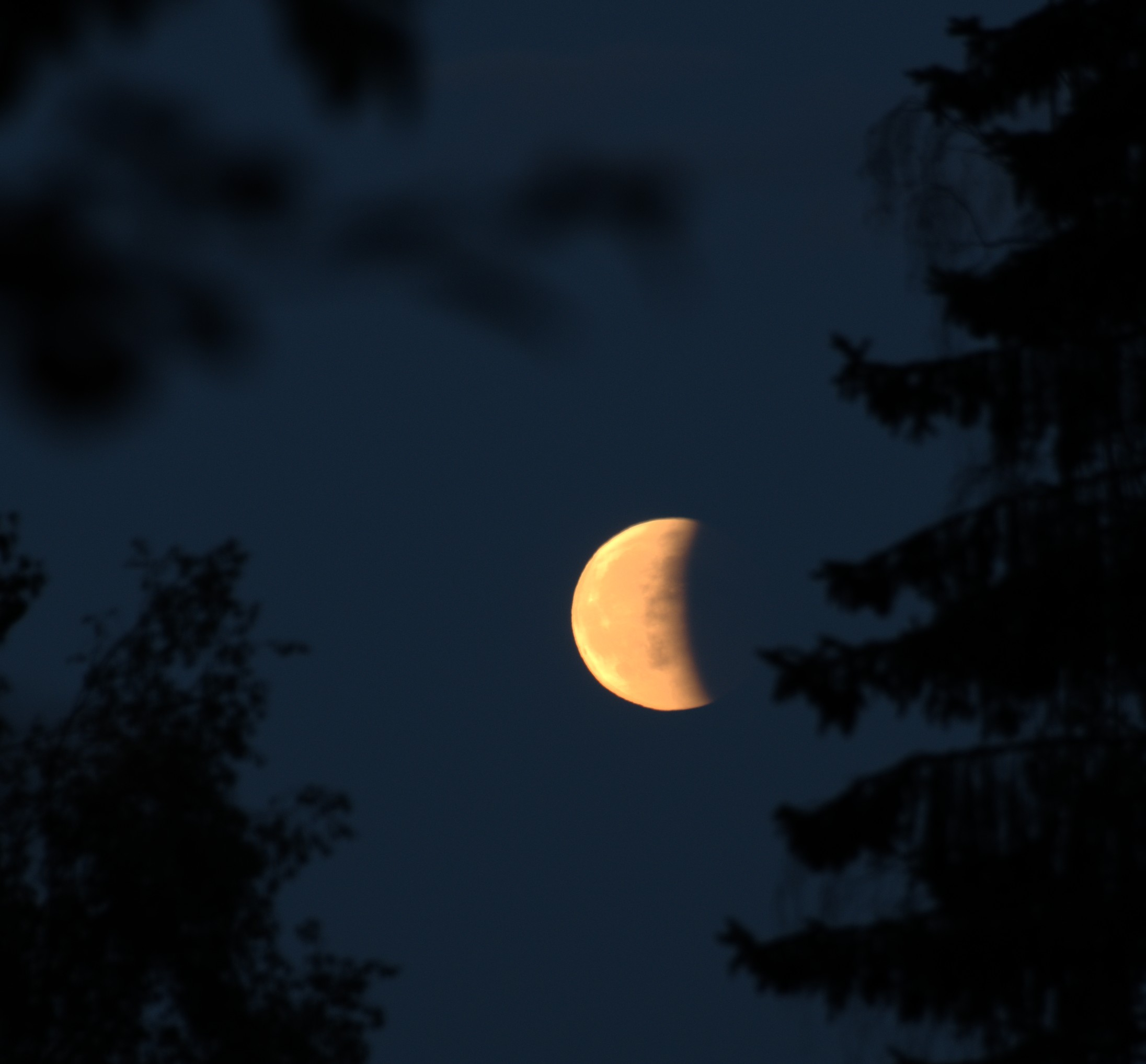
Bærum, Norway, 21:37 UTC

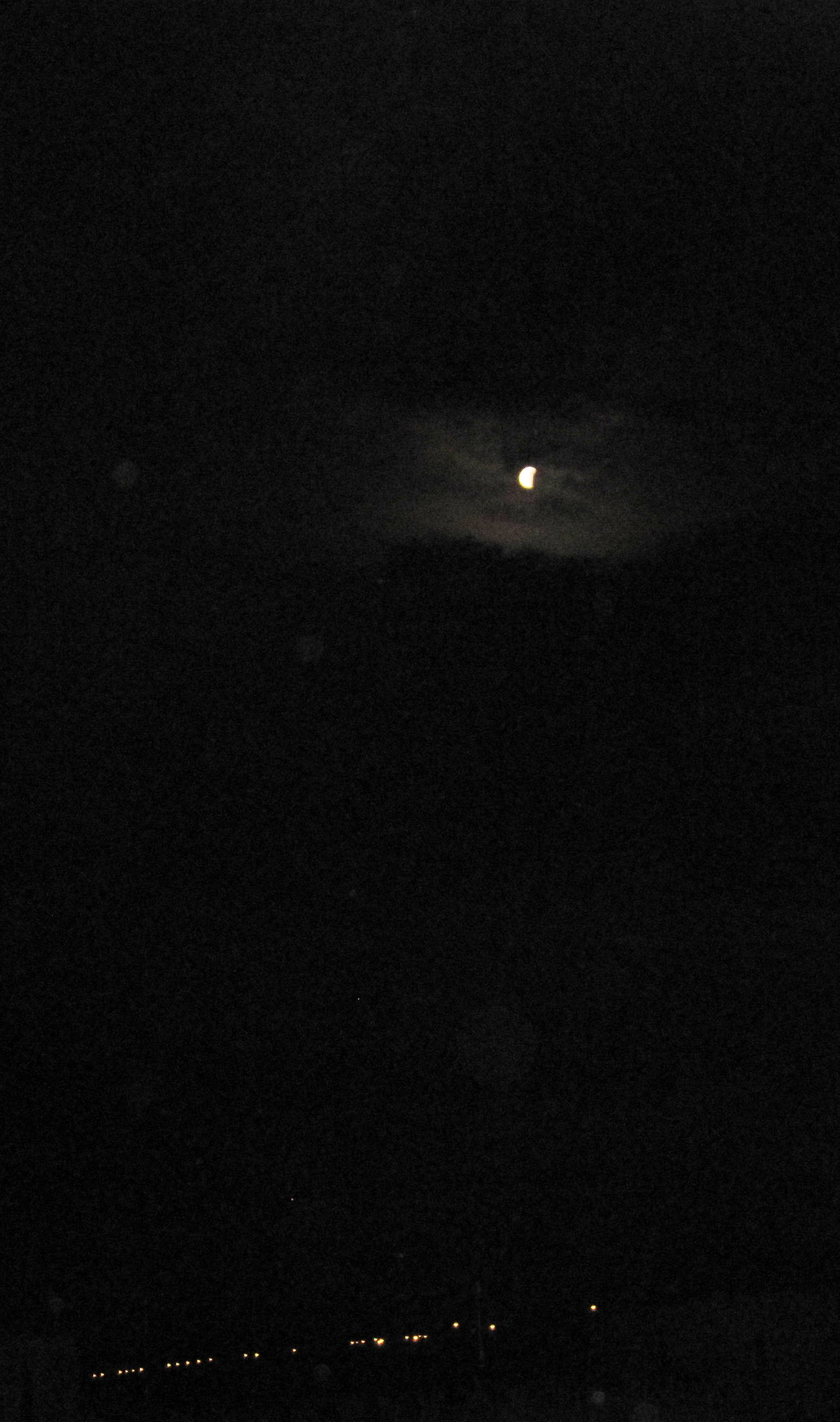
Tbilisi, Georgia, 21:45 UTC

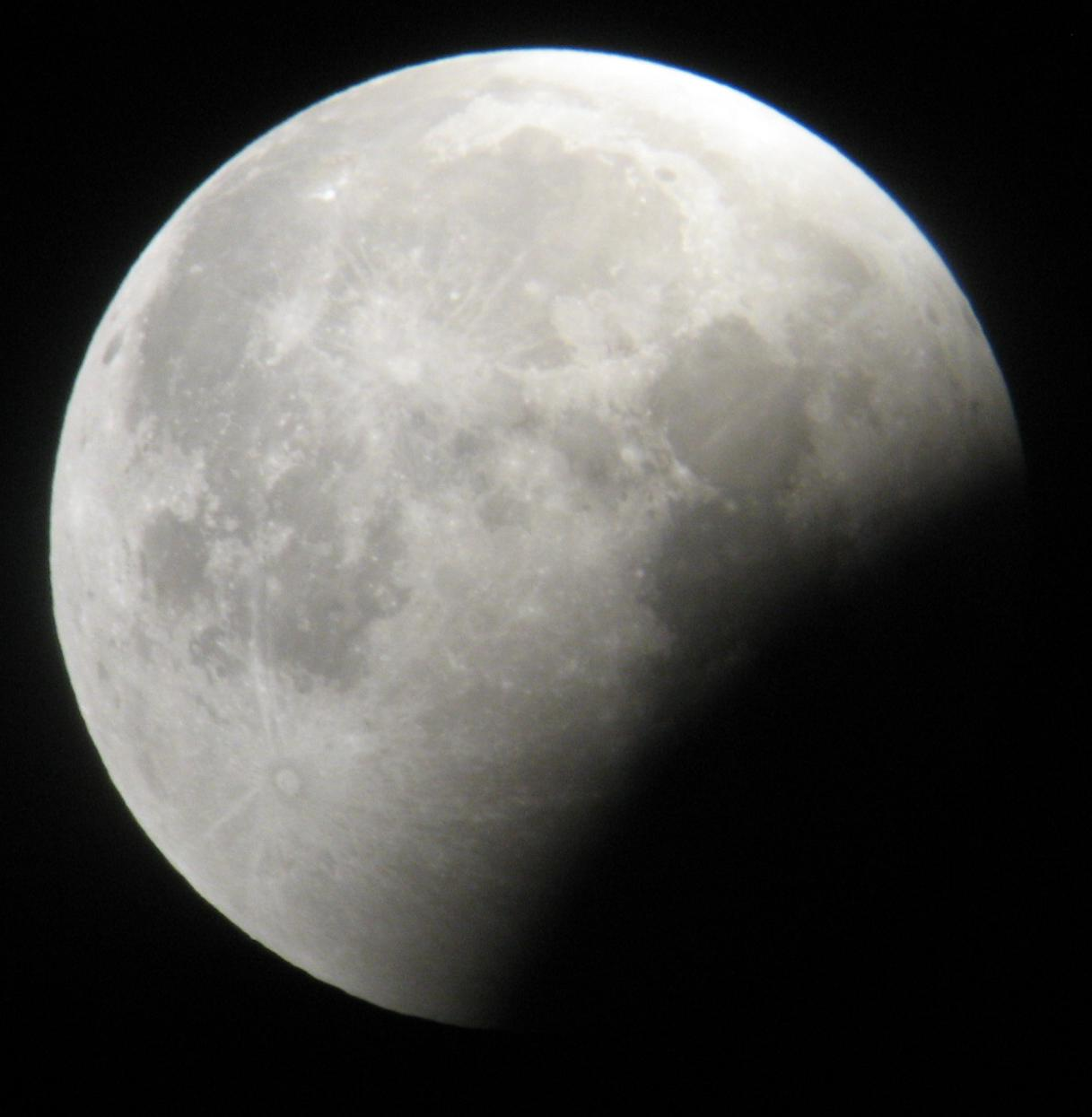
Budapest, Hungary, 21:50 UTC

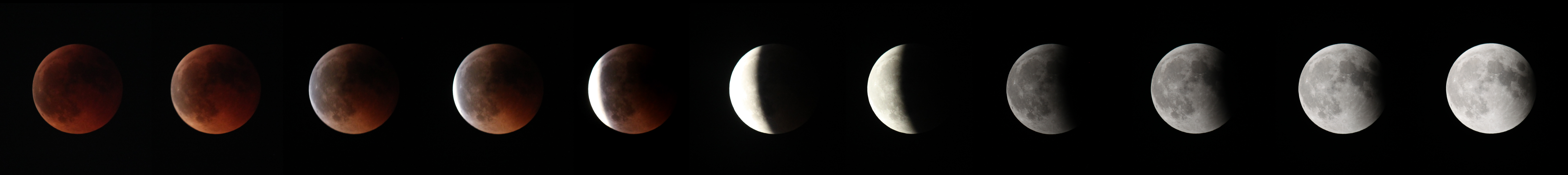
Vienna, Austria

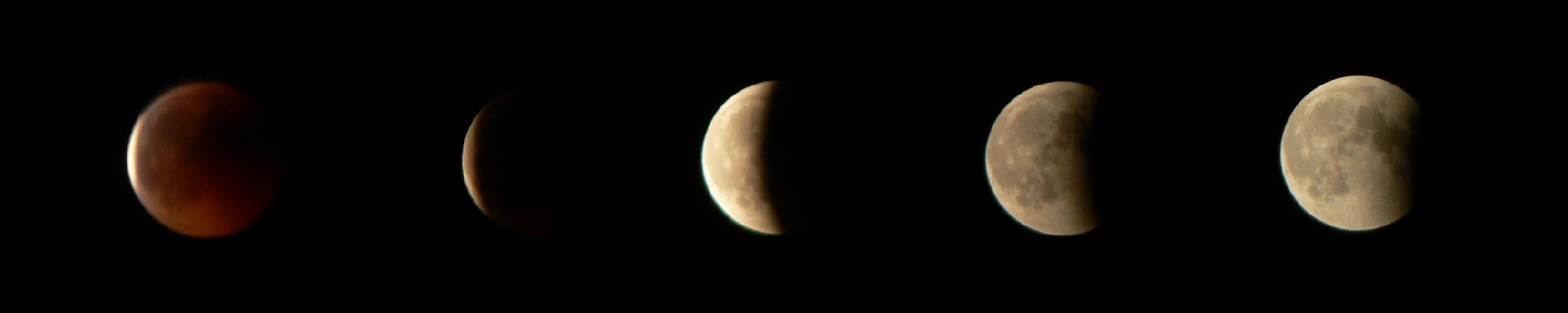
Sobotin, Czech republic

Animation from Pagny-le-Château, France

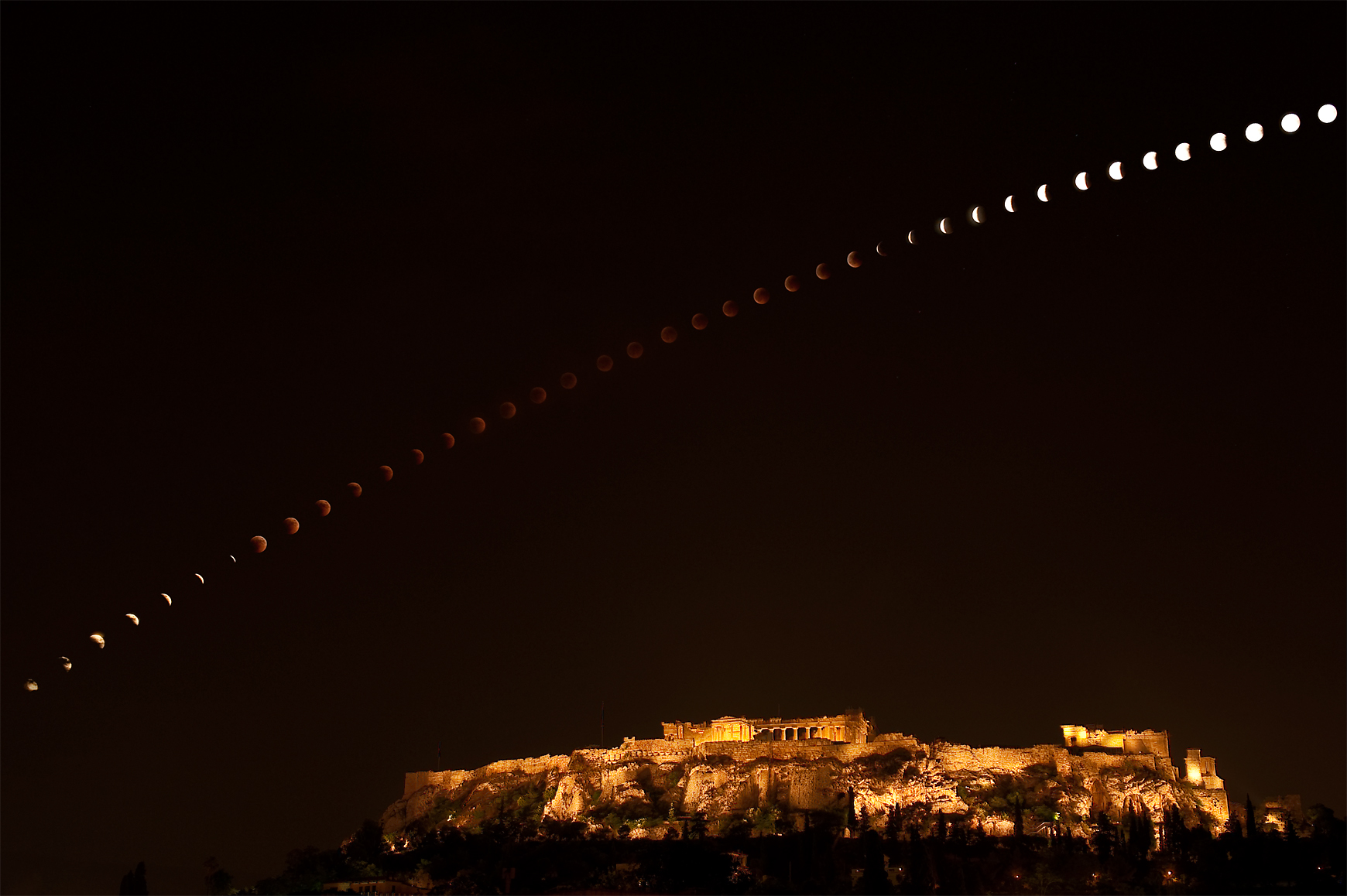
Athens, Greece

Animation from Novosibirsk, Russia

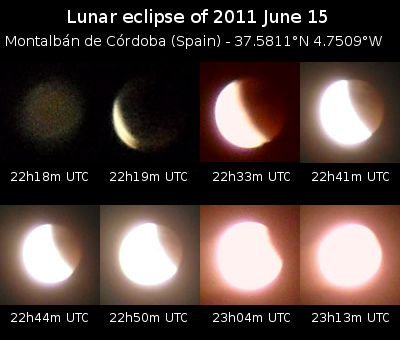
Córdoba, Spain

== Eclipse details ==
Shown below is a table displaying details about this particular lunar eclipse. It describes various parameters pertaining to this eclipse.

June 15, 2011 Lunar Eclipse Parameters
Parameter	Value
Penumbral Magnitude	2.68833
Umbral Magnitude	1.70136
Gamma	0.08968
Sun Right Ascension	05h35m33.6s
Sun Declination	+23°19'06.1"
Sun Semi-Diameter	15'44.7"
Sun Equatorial Horizontal Parallax	08.7"
Moon Right Ascension	17h35m32.3s
Moon Declination	-23°13'51.6"
Moon Semi-Diameter	15'57.2"
Moon Equatorial Horizontal Parallax	0°58'33.0"
ΔT	66.5 s

== Eclipse season ==
This eclipse is part of an eclipse season, a period, roughly every six months, when eclipses occur. Only two (or occasionally three) eclipse seasons occur each year, and each season lasts about 35 days and repeats just short of six months (173 days) later; thus two full eclipse seasons always occur each year. Either two or three eclipses happen each eclipse season. In the sequence below, each eclipse is separated by a fortnight. The first and last eclipse in this sequence is separated by one synodic month.

Eclipse season of June–July 2011
June 1 Descending node (new moon)	June 15 Ascending node (full moon)	July 1 Descending node (new moon)
Partial solar eclipse Solar Saros 118	Total lunar eclipse Lunar Saros 130	Partial solar eclipse Solar Saros 156

== Related eclipses ==
=== Eclipses in 2011 ===
- A partial solar eclipse on January 4.
- A partial solar eclipse on June 1.
- A total lunar eclipse on June 15.
- A partial solar eclipse on July 1.
- A partial solar eclipse on November 25.
- A total lunar eclipse on December 10.

=== Metonic ===
- Preceded by: Lunar eclipse of August 28, 2007
- Followed by: Lunar eclipse of April 4, 2015

=== Tzolkinex ===
- Preceded by: Lunar eclipse of May 4, 2004
- Followed by: Lunar eclipse of July 27, 2018

=== Half-Saros ===
- Preceded by: Solar eclipse of June 10, 2002
- Followed by: Solar eclipse of June 21, 2020

=== Tritos ===
- Preceded by: Lunar eclipse of July 16, 2000
- Followed by: Lunar eclipse of May 16, 2022

=== Lunar Saros 130 ===
- Preceded by: Lunar eclipse of June 4, 1993
- Followed by: Lunar eclipse of June 26, 2029

=== Inex ===
- Preceded by: Lunar eclipse of July 6, 1982
- Followed by: Lunar eclipse of May 26, 2040

=== Triad ===
- Preceded by: Lunar eclipse of August 14, 1924
- Followed by: Lunar eclipse of April 15, 2098

=== Lunar eclipses of 2009–2013 ===
This eclipse is a member of a semester series. An eclipse in a semester series of lunar eclipses repeats approximately every 177 days and 4 hours (a semester) at alternating nodes of the Moon's orbit.

The penumbral lunar eclipses on February 9, 2009 and August 6, 2009 occur in the previous lunar year eclipse set, and the lunar eclipses on April 25, 2013 (partial) and October 18, 2013 (penumbral) occur in the next lunar year eclipse set.

Lunar eclipse series sets from 2009 to 2013
Ascending node				Descending node			
Saros	Date Viewing	Type Chart	Gamma	Saros	Date Viewing	Type Chart	Gamma
110	2009 Jul 07	Penumbral	−1.4916	115	2009 Dec 31	Partial	0.9766
120	2010 Jun 26	Partial	−0.7091	125	2010 Dec 21	Total	0.3214
130	2011 Jun 15	Total	0.0897	135	2011 Dec 10	Total	−0.3882
140	2012 Jun 04	Partial	0.8248	145	2012 Nov 28	Penumbral	−1.0869
150	2013 May 25	Penumbral	1.5351				

=== Saros 130 ===
This eclipse is a part of Saros series 130, repeating every 18 years, 11 days, and containing 71 events. The series started with a penumbral lunar eclipse on June 10, 1416. It contains partial eclipses from September 4, 1560 through April 12, 1903; total eclipses from April 22, 1921 through September 11, 2155; and a second set of partial eclipses from September 21, 2173 through May 10, 2552. The series ends at member 71 as a penumbral eclipse on July 26, 2678.

The longest duration of totality will be produced by member 35 at 101 minutes, 53 seconds on June 26, 2029. All eclipses in this series occur at the Moon’s ascending node of orbit.

Greatest	First			
The greatest eclipse of the series will occur on 2029 Jun 26, lasting 101 minutes, 53 seconds.	Penumbral	Partial	Total	Central
The greatest eclipse of the series will occur on 2029 Jun 26, lasting 101 minutes, 53 seconds.	1416 Jun 10	1560 Sep 04	1921 Apr 22	1975 May 25
The greatest eclipse of the series will occur on 2029 Jun 26, lasting 101 minutes, 53 seconds.	Last			
The greatest eclipse of the series will occur on 2029 Jun 26, lasting 101 minutes, 53 seconds.	Central	Total	Partial	Penumbral
The greatest eclipse of the series will occur on 2029 Jun 26, lasting 101 minutes, 53 seconds.	2083 Jul 29	2155 Sep 11	2552 May 10	2678 Jul 26

Eclipses are tabulated in three columns; every third eclipse in the same column is one exeligmos apart, so they all cast shadows over approximately the same parts of the Earth.

Series members 23–44 occur between 1801 and 2200:
23	24	25
1813 Feb 15	1831 Feb 26	1849 Mar 09
26	27	28
1867 Mar 20	1885 Mar 30	1903 Apr 12
29	30	31
1921 Apr 22	1939 May 03	1957 May 13
32	33	34
1975 May 25	1993 Jun 04	2011 Jun 15
35	36	37
2029 Jun 26	2047 Jul 07	2065 Jul 17
38	39	40
2083 Jul 29	2101 Aug 09	2119 Aug 20
41	42	43
2137 Aug 30	2155 Sep 11	2173 Sep 21
44
2191 Oct 02

=== Tritos series ===
This eclipse is a part of a tritos cycle, repeating at alternating nodes every 135 synodic months (≈ 3986.63 days, or 11 years minus 1 month). Their appearance and longitude are irregular due to a lack of synchronization with the anomalistic month (period of perigee), but groupings of 3 tritos cycles (≈ 33 years minus 3 months) come close (≈ 434.044 anomalistic months), so eclipses are similar in these groupings.

Series members between 1801 and 2200
1804 Jan 26 (Saros 111)	1814 Dec 26 (Saros 112)	1825 Nov 25 (Saros 113)	1836 Oct 24 (Saros 114)	1847 Sep 24 (Saros 115)
1858 Aug 24 (Saros 116)	1869 Jul 23 (Saros 117)	1880 Jun 22 (Saros 118)	1891 May 23 (Saros 119)	1902 Apr 22 (Saros 120)
1913 Mar 22 (Saros 121)	1924 Feb 20 (Saros 122)	1935 Jan 19 (Saros 123)	1945 Dec 19 (Saros 124)	1956 Nov 18 (Saros 125)
1967 Oct 18 (Saros 126)	1978 Sep 16 (Saros 127)	1989 Aug 17 (Saros 128)	2000 Jul 16 (Saros 129)	2011 Jun 15 (Saros 130)
2022 May 16 (Saros 131)	2033 Apr 14 (Saros 132)	2044 Mar 13 (Saros 133)	2055 Feb 11 (Saros 134)	2066 Jan 11 (Saros 135)
2076 Dec 10 (Saros 136)	2087 Nov 10 (Saros 137)	2098 Oct 10 (Saros 138)	2109 Sep 09 (Saros 139)	2120 Aug 09 (Saros 140)
2131 Jul 10 (Saros 141)	2142 Jun 08 (Saros 142)	2153 May 08 (Saros 143)	2164 Apr 07 (Saros 144)	2175 Mar 07 (Saros 145)
2186 Feb 04 (Saros 146)	2197 Jan 04 (Saros 147)			

=== Inex series ===
This eclipse is a part of the long period inex cycle, repeating at alternating nodes, every 358 synodic months (≈ 10,571.95 days, or 29 years minus 20 days). Their appearance and longitude are irregular due to a lack of synchronization with the anomalistic month (period of perigee). However, groupings of 3 inex cycles (≈ 87 years minus 2 months) comes close (≈ 1,151.02 anomalistic months), so eclipses are similar in these groupings.

Series members between 1801 and 2200
1808 Nov 03 (Saros 123)	1837 Oct 13 (Saros 124)	1866 Sep 24 (Saros 125)
1895 Sep 04 (Saros 126)	1924 Aug 14 (Saros 127)	1953 Jul 26 (Saros 128)
1982 Jul 06 (Saros 129)	2011 Jun 15 (Saros 130)	2040 May 26 (Saros 131)
2069 May 06 (Saros 132)	2098 Apr 15 (Saros 133)	2127 Mar 28 (Saros 134)
2156 Mar 07 (Saros 135)	2185 Feb 14 (Saros 136)	

=== Half-Saros cycle ===
A lunar eclipse will be preceded and followed by solar eclipses by 9 years and 5.5 days (a half saros). This lunar eclipse is related to two annular solar eclipses of Solar Saros 137.

June 10, 2002	June 21, 2020

== See also ==
- List of lunar eclipses and List of 21st-century lunar eclipses
- December 2010 lunar eclipse
- December 2011 lunar eclipse
- File:2011-06-15 Lunar Eclipse Sketch.gif Chart
- Solar eclipse
