= July 2000 lunar eclipse =

Central lunar eclipse

- Total eclipse
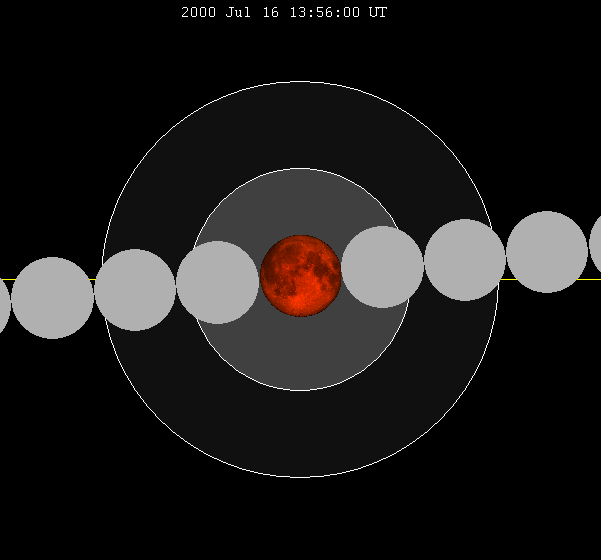
- Hourly motion shown right to left
- Date: July 16, 2000
- Gamma: 0.0302
- Magnitude: 1.7684
- Saros cycle: 129 (37 of 71)
- Totality: 106 minutes, 25 seconds
- Partiality: 236 minutes, 2 seconds
- Penumbral: 374 minutes, 31 seconds
Contacts (UTC)
- P1: 10:48:22
- U1: 11:57:35
- U2: 13:02:23
- Greatest: 13:55:35
- U3: 14:48:47
- U4: 15:53:55
- P4: 17:02:46

External images
- http://www.phys.ttu.edu/~ozprof/le16700.htm
- https://www.kwasan.kyoto-u.ac.jp/old_pages/Kwasan/moon_e.html
- https://abc.net.au/science/space/moon/moonpic11.htm

A total lunar eclipse occurred at the Moon’s descending node of orbit on Sunday, July 16, 2000, with an umbral magnitude of 1.7684. It was a central lunar eclipse, in which part of the Moon passed through the center of the Earth's shadow. A lunar eclipse occurs when the Moon moves into the Earth's shadow, causing the Moon to be darkened. A total lunar eclipse occurs when the Moon's near side entirely passes into the Earth's umbral shadow. Unlike a solar eclipse, which can only be viewed from a relatively small area of the world, a lunar eclipse may be viewed from anywhere on the night side of Earth. A total lunar eclipse can last up to nearly two hours, while a total solar eclipse lasts only a few minutes at any given place, because the Moon's shadow is smaller. Occurring about 1.1 days after apogee (on July 15, 2000, at 11:30 UTC), the Moon's apparent diameter was smaller.

Totality lasted for 106 minutes and 25 seconds, the longest duration since 13 August 1859 (106 minutes and 28 seconds) and 3 May 459 (106 minutes and 32 seconds), and totality of this length will not occur again until 19 August 4753 (106 minutes and 35 seconds). This was the last and longest total lunar eclipse of the 20th century, as well as the second longest and last of the second millennium. It was also the eighth longest total lunar eclipse on EclipseWise's Six Millennium Catalog of Lunar Eclipses, which covers the years 3000 BCE to 3000 AD. The longest total lunar eclipse between the years 4000 BCE and 6000 CE took place on 31 May 318. Totality lasted 106 minutes and 36 seconds, which is only 11 seconds longer than this one.

== Visibility ==
The eclipse was completely visible over Australia, Antarctica, and much of the Pacific Ocean, seen rising over Asia and eastern Africa and setting over western North and South America.

The Moon passed straight through the center of the Earth's shadow at the descending node in Sagittarius of its orbit.

== Eclipse details ==
Shown below is a table displaying details about this particular lunar eclipse. It describes various parameters pertaining to this eclipse.

July 16, 2000 lunar eclipse parameters
Parameter	Value
Penumbral magnitude	2.83749
Umbral magnitude	1.76839
Gamma	0.03015
Sun right ascension	07h44m54.7s
Sun declination	+21°15'02.4"
Sun semi-diameter	15'44.2"
Sun equatorial horizontal parallax	08.7"
Moon right ascension	19h44m54.2s
Moon declination	-21°13'24.9"
Moon semi-diameter	14'43.2"
Moon equatorial horizontal parallax	0°54'01.2"
ΔT	64.0 s

== Eclipse season ==
This eclipse is part of an eclipse season, a period, roughly every six months, when eclipses occur. Only two (or occasionally three) eclipse seasons occur each year, and each season lasts about 35 days and repeats just short of six months (173 days) later; thus two full eclipse seasons always occur each year. Either two or three eclipses happen each eclipse season. In the sequence below, each eclipse is separated by a fortnight. The first and last eclipse in this sequence is separated by one synodic month.

Eclipse season of July 2000
July 1 Ascending node (new moon)	July 16 Descending node (full moon)	July 31 Ascending node (new moon)
Partial solar eclipse Solar Saros 117	Total lunar eclipse Lunar Saros 129	Partial solar eclipse Solar Saros 155

== Related eclipses ==
=== Eclipses in 2000 ===
- A total lunar eclipse on January 21
- A partial solar eclipse on February 5
- A partial solar eclipse on July 1
- A total lunar eclipse on July 16
- A partial solar eclipse on July 31
- A partial solar eclipse on December 25

=== Metonic ===
- Preceded by: Lunar eclipse of September 27, 1996
- Followed by: Lunar eclipse of May 4, 2004

=== Tzolkinex ===
- Preceded by: Lunar eclipse of June 4, 1993
- Followed by: Lunar eclipse of August 28, 2007

=== Half-Saros ===
- Preceded by: Solar eclipse of July 11, 1991
- Followed by: Solar eclipse of July 22, 2009

=== Tritos ===
- Preceded by: Lunar eclipse of August 17, 1989
- Followed by: Lunar eclipse of June 15, 2011

=== Lunar Saros 129 ===
- Preceded by: Lunar eclipse of July 6, 1982
- Followed by: Lunar eclipse of July 27, 2018

=== Inex ===
- Preceded by: Lunar eclipse of August 6, 1971
- Followed by: Lunar eclipse of June 26, 2029

=== Triad ===
- Preceded by: Lunar eclipse of September 15, 1913
- Followed by: Lunar eclipse of May 17, 2087

=== Lunar eclipses of 1998–2002 ===
This eclipse is a member of a semester series. An eclipse in a semester series of lunar eclipses repeats approximately every 177 days and 4 hours (a semester) at alternating nodes of the Moon's orbit.

The penumbral lunar eclipses on March 13, 1998 and September 6, 1998 occur in the previous lunar year eclipse set, and the penumbral lunar eclipses on May 26, 2002 and November 20, 2002 occur in the next lunar year eclipse set.

Lunar eclipse series sets from 1998 to 2002
Descending node				Ascending node			
Saros	Date Viewing	Type Chart	Gamma	Saros	Date Viewing	Type Chart	Gamma
109	1998 Aug 08	Penumbral	1.4876	114	1999 Jan 31	Penumbral	−1.0190
119	1999 Jul 28	Partial	0.7863	124	2000 Jan 21	Total	−0.2957
129	2000 Jul 16	Total	0.0302	134	2001 Jan 09	Total	0.3720
139	2001 Jul 05	Partial	−0.7287	144	2001 Dec 30	Penumbral	1.0732
149	2002 Jun 24	Penumbral	−1.4440				

=== Saros 129 ===
This eclipse is a part of Saros series 129, repeating every 18 years, 11 days, and containing 71 events. The series started with a penumbral lunar eclipse on June 10, 1351. It contains partial eclipses from September 26, 1531 through May 11, 1892; total eclipses from May 24, 1910 through September 8, 2090; and a second set of partial eclipses from September 20, 2108 through April 26, 2469. The series ends at member 71 as a penumbral eclipse on July 24, 2613.

The longest duration of totality was produced by member 37 at 106 minutes, 24 seconds on July 16, 2000. All eclipses in this series occur at the Moon’s descending node of orbit.

Greatest	First			
The greatest eclipse of the series occurred on 2000 Jul 16, lasting 106 minutes, 24 seconds.	Penumbral	Partial	Total	Central
The greatest eclipse of the series occurred on 2000 Jul 16, lasting 106 minutes, 24 seconds.	1351 Jun 10	1531 Sep 26	1910 May 24	1946 Jun 14
The greatest eclipse of the series occurred on 2000 Jul 16, lasting 106 minutes, 24 seconds.	Last			
The greatest eclipse of the series occurred on 2000 Jul 16, lasting 106 minutes, 24 seconds.	Central	Total	Partial	Penumbral
The greatest eclipse of the series occurred on 2000 Jul 16, lasting 106 minutes, 24 seconds.	2036 Aug 07	2090 Sep 08	2469 Apr 26	2613 Jul 24

Eclipses are tabulated in three columns; every third eclipse in the same column is one exeligmos apart, so they all cast shadows over approximately the same parts of the Earth.

Series members 26–48 occur between 1801 and 2200:
26	27	28
1802 Mar 19	1820 Mar 29	1838 Apr 10
29	30	31
1856 Apr 20	1874 May 01	1892 May 11
32	33	34
1910 May 24	1928 Jun 03	1946 Jun 14
35	36	37
1964 Jun 25	1982 Jul 06	2000 Jul 16
38	39	40
2018 Jul 27	2036 Aug 07	2054 Aug 18
41	42	43
2072 Aug 28	2090 Sep 08	2108 Sep 20
44	45	46
2126 Oct 01	2144 Oct 11	2162 Oct 23
47	48	
2180 Nov 02	2198 Nov 13	

=== Tritos series ===
This eclipse is a part of a tritos cycle, repeating at alternating nodes every 135 synodic months (≈ 3986.63 days, or 11 years minus 1 month). Their appearance and longitude are irregular due to a lack of synchronization with the anomalistic month (period of perigee), but groupings of 3 tritos cycles (≈ 33 years minus 3 months) come close (≈ 434.044 anomalistic months), so eclipses are similar in these groupings.

Series members between 1801 and 2200
1804 Jan 26 (Saros 111)	1814 Dec 26 (Saros 112)	1825 Nov 25 (Saros 113)	1836 Oct 24 (Saros 114)	1847 Sep 24 (Saros 115)
1858 Aug 24 (Saros 116)	1869 Jul 23 (Saros 117)	1880 Jun 22 (Saros 118)	1891 May 23 (Saros 119)	1902 Apr 22 (Saros 120)
1913 Mar 22 (Saros 121)	1924 Feb 20 (Saros 122)	1935 Jan 19 (Saros 123)	1945 Dec 19 (Saros 124)	1956 Nov 18 (Saros 125)
1967 Oct 18 (Saros 126)	1978 Sep 16 (Saros 127)	1989 Aug 17 (Saros 128)	2000 Jul 16 (Saros 129)	2011 Jun 15 (Saros 130)
2022 May 16 (Saros 131)	2033 Apr 14 (Saros 132)	2044 Mar 13 (Saros 133)	2055 Feb 11 (Saros 134)	2066 Jan 11 (Saros 135)
2076 Dec 10 (Saros 136)	2087 Nov 10 (Saros 137)	2098 Oct 10 (Saros 138)	2109 Sep 09 (Saros 139)	2120 Aug 09 (Saros 140)
2131 Jul 10 (Saros 141)	2142 Jun 08 (Saros 142)	2153 May 08 (Saros 143)	2164 Apr 07 (Saros 144)	2175 Mar 07 (Saros 145)
2186 Feb 04 (Saros 146)	2197 Jan 04 (Saros 147)			

=== Inex series ===
This eclipse is a part of the long period inex cycle, repeating at alternating nodes, every 358 synodic months (≈ 10,571.95 days, or 29 years minus 20 days). Their appearance and longitude are irregular due to a lack of synchronization with the anomalistic month (period of perigee). However, groupings of 3 inex cycles (≈ 87 years minus 2 months) comes close (≈ 1,151.02 anomalistic months), so eclipses are similar in these groupings.

Series members between 1801 and 2200
1826 Nov 14 (Saros 123)	1855 Oct 25 (Saros 124)	1884 Oct 04 (Saros 125)
1913 Sep 15 (Saros 126)	1942 Aug 26 (Saros 127)	1971 Aug 06 (Saros 128)
2000 Jul 16 (Saros 129)	2029 Jun 26 (Saros 130)	2058 Jun 06 (Saros 131)
2087 May 17 (Saros 132)	2116 Apr 27 (Saros 133)	2145 Apr 07 (Saros 134)
2174 Mar 18 (Saros 135)

=== Half-Saros cycle ===
A lunar eclipse will be preceded and followed by solar eclipses by 9 years and 5.5 days (a half saros). This lunar eclipse is related to two total solar eclipses of Solar Saros 136.

July 11, 1991	July 22, 2009

== See also ==
- List of lunar eclipses
- List of 20th-century lunar eclipses
