= 1982 lunar eclipse =

Three total lunar eclipses occurred in 1982:

- 9 January 1982 lunar eclipse
- 6 July 1982 lunar eclipse
- 30 December 1982 lunar eclipse

== See also ==
- List of 20th-century lunar eclipses
- Lists of lunar eclipses
