= January 2037 lunar eclipse =

Astronomical event

- Total eclipse
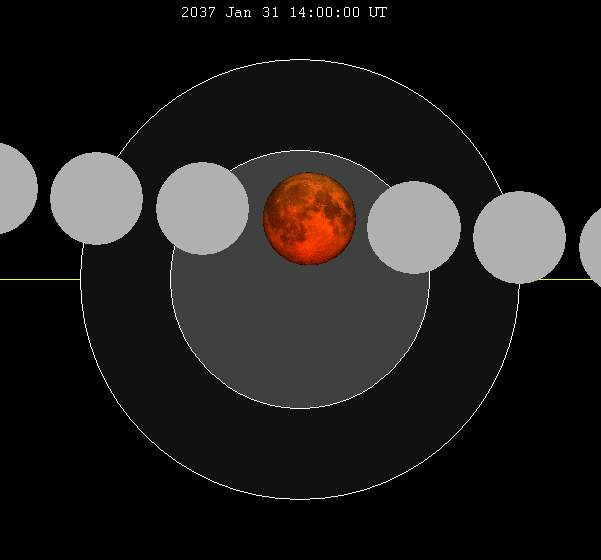
- The Moon's hourly motion shown right to left
- Date: January 31, 2037
- Gamma: 0.3619
- Magnitude: 1.2086
- Saros cycle: 134 (28 of 73)
- Totality: 63 minutes, 41 seconds
- Partiality: 197 minutes, 28 seconds
- Penumbral: 312 minutes, 6 seconds
Contacts (UTC)
- P1: 11:24:12
- U1: 12:21:32
- U2: 13:28:26
- Greatest: 14:00:16
- U3: 14:32:07
- U4: 15:39:00
- P4: 16:36:18

A total lunar eclipse will occur at the Moon’s ascending node of orbit on Saturday, January 31, 2037, with an umbral magnitude of 1.2086. A lunar eclipse occurs when the Moon moves into the Earth's shadow, causing the Moon to be darkened. A total lunar eclipse occurs when the Moon's near side entirely passes into the Earth's umbral shadow. Unlike a solar eclipse, which can only be viewed from a relatively small area of the world, a lunar eclipse may be viewed from anywhere on the night side of Earth. A total lunar eclipse can last up to nearly two hours, while a total solar eclipse lasts only a few minutes at any given place, because the Moon's shadow is smaller. Occurring only about 12 hours before perigee (on February 1, 2037, at 2:00 UTC), the Moon's apparent diameter will be larger.

This eclipse occurs during a supermoon and a blue moon (second full moon of month), of which the most recent occurrence was on January 31, 2018, one previous metonic cycle (19 years).

== Visibility ==
The eclipse will be completely visible over east and northeast Asia, Australia, and northwestern North America, seen rising over west Asia, eastern Europe, and east Africa and setting over most of North America and the eastern Pacific Ocean.

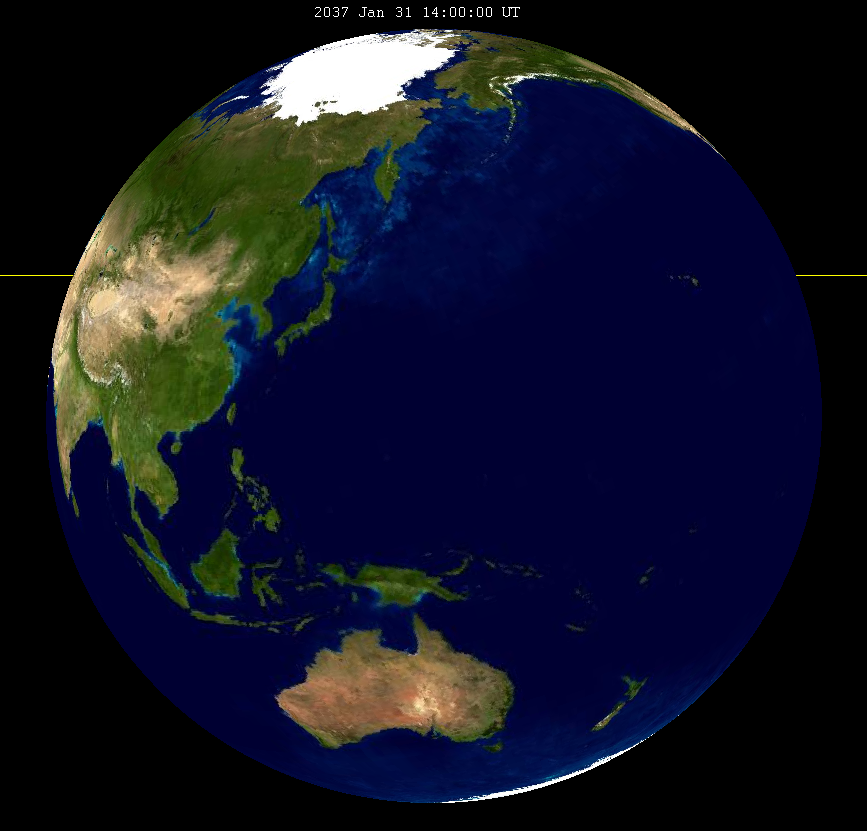
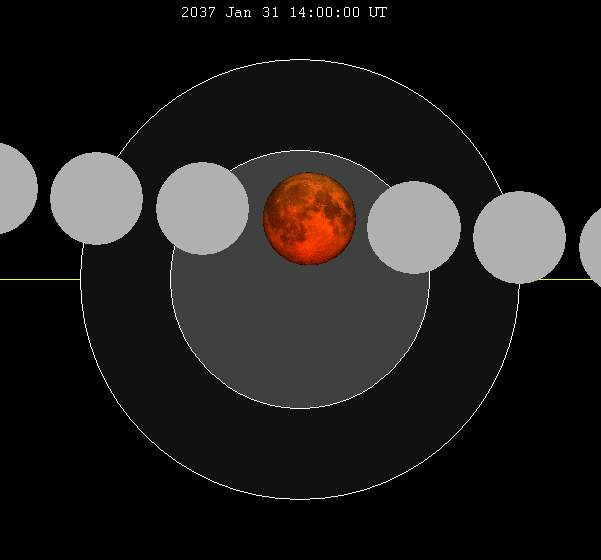

== Eclipse details ==
Shown below is a table displaying details about this particular solar eclipse. It describes various parameters pertaining to this eclipse.

January 31, 2037 Lunar Eclipse Parameters
Parameter	Value
Penumbral Magnitude	2.18148
Umbral Magnitude	1.20858
Gamma	0.36190
Sun Right Ascension	20h57m58.6s
Sun Declination	-17°10'47.4"
Sun Semi-Diameter	16'14.0"
Sun Equatorial Horizontal Parallax	08.9"
Moon Right Ascension	08h58m15.6s
Moon Declination	+17°32'34.5"
Moon Semi-Diameter	16'41.1"
Moon Equatorial Horizontal Parallax	1°01'14.2"
ΔT	77.5 s

== Eclipse season ==
This eclipse is part of an eclipse season, a period, roughly every six months, when eclipses occur. Only two (or occasionally three) eclipse seasons occur each year, and each season lasts about 35 days and repeats just short of six months (173 days) later; thus two full eclipse seasons always occur each year. Either two or three eclipses happen each eclipse season. In the sequence below, each eclipse is separated by a fortnight.

Eclipse season of January 2037
January 16 Descending node (new moon)	January 31 Ascending node (full moon)
Partial solar eclipse Solar Saros 122	Total lunar eclipse Lunar Saros 134

== Related eclipses ==
=== Eclipses in 2037 ===
- A partial solar eclipse on January 16.
- A total lunar eclipse on January 31.
- A total solar eclipse on July 13.
- A partial lunar eclipse on July 27.

=== Metonic ===
- Preceded by: Lunar eclipse of April 14, 2033
- Followed by: Lunar eclipse of November 18, 2040

=== Tzolkinex ===
- Preceded by: Lunar eclipse of December 20, 2029
- Followed by: Lunar eclipse of March 13, 2044

=== Half-Saros ===
- Preceded by: Solar eclipse of January 26, 2028
- Followed by: Solar eclipse of February 5, 2046

=== Tritos ===
- Preceded by: Lunar eclipse of March 3, 2026
- Followed by: Lunar eclipse of January 1, 2048

=== Lunar Saros 134 ===
- Preceded by: Lunar eclipse of January 21, 2019
- Followed by: Lunar eclipse of February 11, 2055

=== Inex ===
- Preceded by: Lunar eclipse of February 21, 2008
- Followed by: Lunar eclipse of January 11, 2066

=== Triad ===
- Preceded by: Lunar eclipse of April 2, 1950
- Followed by: Lunar eclipse of December 3, 2123

=== Lunar eclipses of 2035–2038 ===
This eclipse is a member of a semester series. An eclipse in a semester series of lunar eclipses repeats approximately every 177 days and 4 hours (a semester) at alternating nodes of the Moon's orbit.

The penumbral lunar eclipses on June 17, 2038 and December 11, 2038 occur in the next lunar year eclipse set.

Lunar eclipse series sets from 2035 to 2038
Ascending node				Descending node			
Saros	Date Viewing	Type Chart	Gamma	Saros	Date Viewing	Type Chart	Gamma
114	2035 Feb 22	Penumbral	−1.0357	119	2035 Aug 19	Partial	0.9433
124	2036 Feb 11	Total	−0.3110	129	2036 Aug 07	Total	0.2004
134	2037 Jan 31	Total	0.3619	139	2037 Jul 27	Partial	−0.5582
144	2038 Jan 21	Penumbral	1.0710	149	2038 Jul 16	Penumbral	−1.2837

=== Saros 134 ===
This eclipse is a part of Saros series 134, repeating every 18 years, 11 days, and containing 72 events. The series started with a penumbral lunar eclipse on April 1, 1550. It contains partial eclipses from July 7, 1694 through October 13, 1856; total eclipses from October 25, 1874 through July 26, 2325; and a second set of partial eclipses from August 7, 2343 through November 12, 2505. The series ends at member 72 as a penumbral eclipse on May 28, 2830.

The longest duration of totality will be produced by member 38 at 100 minutes, 23 seconds on May 22, 2217. All eclipses in this series occur at the Moon’s ascending node of orbit.

Greatest	First			
The greatest eclipse of the series will occur on 2217 May 22, lasting 100 minutes, 23 seconds.	Penumbral	Partial	Total	Central
The greatest eclipse of the series will occur on 2217 May 22, lasting 100 minutes, 23 seconds.	1550 Apr 01	1694 Jul 07	1874 Oct 25	2127 Mar 28
The greatest eclipse of the series will occur on 2217 May 22, lasting 100 minutes, 23 seconds.	Last			
The greatest eclipse of the series will occur on 2217 May 22, lasting 100 minutes, 23 seconds.	Central	Total	Partial	Penumbral
The greatest eclipse of the series will occur on 2217 May 22, lasting 100 minutes, 23 seconds.	2289 Jul 04	2325 Jul 26	2505 Nov 12	2830 May 28

Eclipses are tabulated in three columns; every third eclipse in the same column is one exeligmos apart, so they all cast shadows over approximately the same parts of the Earth.

Series members 15–37 occur between 1801 and 2200:
15	16	17
1802 Sep 11	1820 Sep 22	1838 Oct 03
18	19	20
1856 Oct 13	1874 Oct 25	1892 Nov 04
21	22	23
1910 Nov 17	1928 Nov 27	1946 Dec 08
24	25	26
1964 Dec 19	1982 Dec 30	2001 Jan 09
27	28	29
2019 Jan 21	2037 Jan 31	2055 Feb 11
30	31	32
2073 Feb 22	2091 Mar 05	2109 Mar 17
33	34	35
2127 Mar 28	2145 Apr 07	2163 Apr 19
36	37	
2181 Apr 29	2199 May 10	

=== Tritos series ===
This eclipse is a part of a tritos cycle, repeating at alternating nodes every 135 synodic months (≈ 3986.63 days, or 11 years minus 1 month). Their appearance and longitude are irregular due to a lack of synchronization with the anomalistic month (period of perigee), but groupings of 3 tritos cycles (≈ 33 years minus 3 months) come close (≈ 434.044 anomalistic months), so eclipses are similar in these groupings.

Series members between 1801 and 2200
1807 Nov 15 (Saros 113)	1818 Oct 14 (Saros 114)	1829 Sep 13 (Saros 115)	1840 Aug 13 (Saros 116)	1851 Jul 13 (Saros 117)
1862 Jun 12 (Saros 118)	1873 May 12 (Saros 119)	1884 Apr 10 (Saros 120)	1895 Mar 11 (Saros 121)	1906 Feb 09 (Saros 122)
1917 Jan 08 (Saros 123)	1927 Dec 08 (Saros 124)	1938 Nov 07 (Saros 125)	1949 Oct 07 (Saros 126)	1960 Sep 05 (Saros 127)
1971 Aug 06 (Saros 128)	1982 Jul 06 (Saros 129)	1993 Jun 04 (Saros 130)	2004 May 04 (Saros 131)	2015 Apr 04 (Saros 132)
2026 Mar 03 (Saros 133)	2037 Jan 31 (Saros 134)	2048 Jan 01 (Saros 135)	2058 Nov 30 (Saros 136)	2069 Oct 30 (Saros 137)
2080 Sep 29 (Saros 138)	2091 Aug 29 (Saros 139)	2102 Jul 30 (Saros 140)	2113 Jun 29 (Saros 141)	2124 May 28 (Saros 142)
2135 Apr 28 (Saros 143)	2146 Mar 28 (Saros 144)	2157 Feb 24 (Saros 145)	2168 Jan 24 (Saros 146)	2178 Dec 24 (Saros 147)
2189 Nov 22 (Saros 148)	2200 Oct 23 (Saros 149)			

=== Inex series ===
This eclipse is a part of the long period inex cycle, repeating at alternating nodes, every 358 synodic months (≈ 10,571.95 days, or 29 years minus 20 days). Their appearance and longitude are irregular due to a lack of synchronization with the anomalistic month (period of perigee). However, groupings of 3 inex cycles (≈ 87 years minus 2 months) comes close (≈ 1,151.02 anomalistic months), so eclipses are similar in these groupings.

Series members between 1801 and 2200
1805 Jul 11 (Saros 126)	1834 Jun 21 (Saros 127)	1863 Jun 01 (Saros 128)
1892 May 11 (Saros 129)	1921 Apr 22 (Saros 130)	1950 Apr 02 (Saros 131)
1979 Mar 13 (Saros 132)	2008 Feb 21 (Saros 133)	2037 Jan 31 (Saros 134)
2066 Jan 11 (Saros 135)	2094 Dec 21 (Saros 136)	2123 Dec 03 (Saros 137)
2152 Nov 12 (Saros 138)	2181 Oct 22 (Saros 139)	

=== Half-Saros cycle ===
A lunar eclipse will be preceded and followed by solar eclipses by 9 years and 5.5 days (a half saros). This lunar eclipse is related to two total solar eclipses of Solar Saros 141.

January 26, 2028	February 5, 2046

== See also ==
- List of lunar eclipses and List of 21st-century lunar eclipses
