= January 2001 lunar eclipse =

Total lunar eclipse 9 January 2001

- Total eclipse
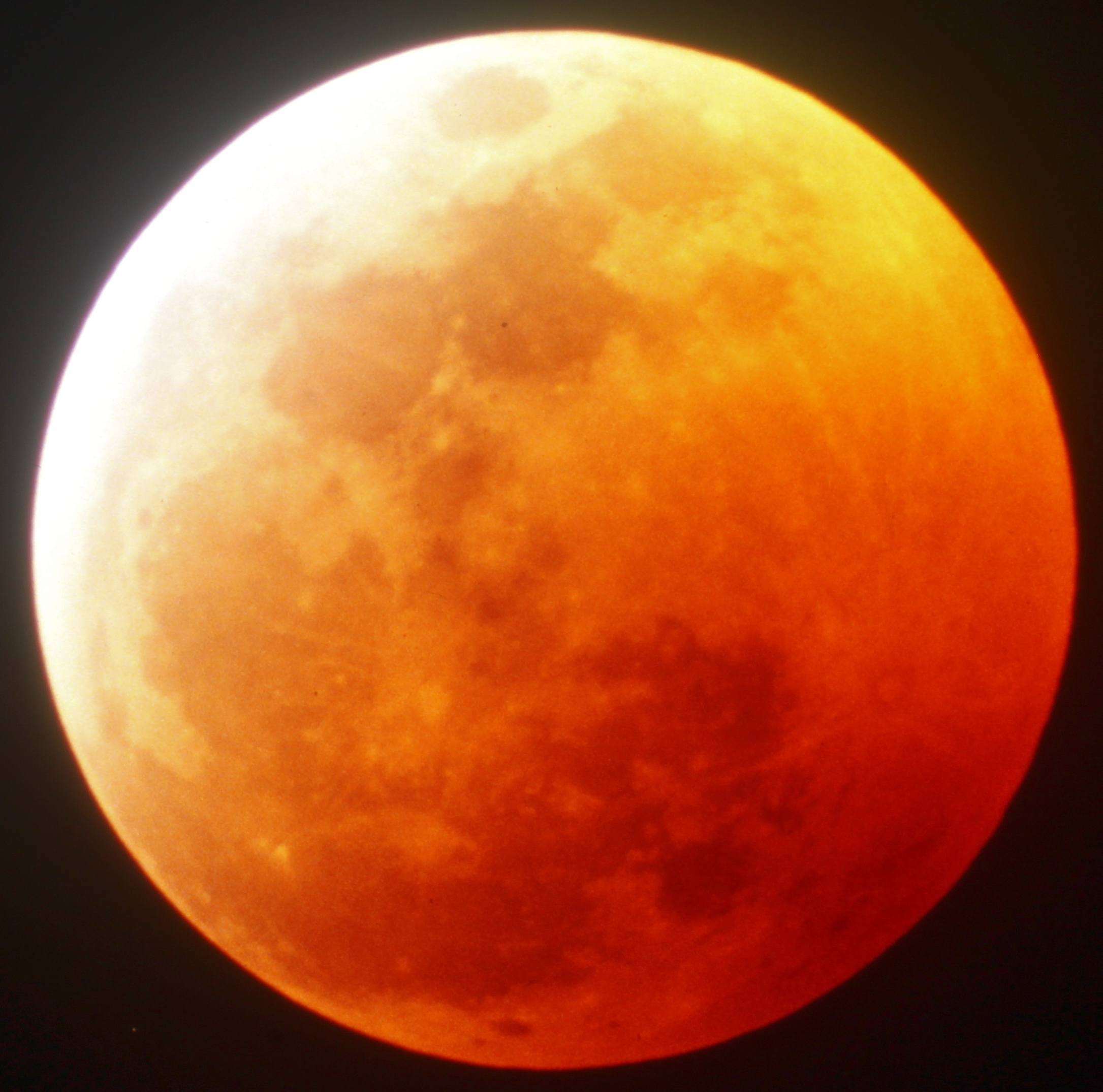
- Totality as viewed from Oria, Italy.
- Date: 9 January 2001
- Gamma: 0.3720
- Magnitude: 1.1902
- Saros cycle: 134 (26 of 73)
- Totality: 61 minutes, 2 seconds
- Partiality: 196 minutes, 19 seconds
- Penumbral: 311 minutes, 2 seconds
Contacts (UTC)
- P1: 17:45:04
- U1: 18:42:27
- U2: 19:50:05
- Greatest: 20:20:35
- U3: 20:51:07
- U4: 21:58:45
- P4: 22:56:06

A total lunar eclipse occurred at the Moon’s ascending node of orbit on Tuesday, 9 January 2001, with an umbral magnitude of 1.1902. A lunar eclipse occurs when the Moon moves into the Earth's shadow, causing the Moon to be darkened. A total lunar eclipse occurs when the Moon's near side entirely passes into the Earth's umbral shadow. Unlike a solar eclipse, which can only be viewed from a relatively small area of the world, a lunar eclipse may be viewed from anywhere on the night side of Earth. A total lunar eclipse can last up to nearly two hours, while a total solar eclipse lasts only a few minutes at any given place, because the Moon's shadow is smaller. Occurring only about 8 hours before perigee (on 10 January 2001, at 4:00 UTC), the Moon's apparent diameter was larger.

== Visibility ==
The eclipse was completely visible over Africa, Europe, and Asia, seen rising over eastern and northern North America and eastern South America and setting over Australia and the western Pacific Ocean.

Hourly motion shown right to left
The Moon passed straight through the center of the Earth's shadow at the descending node in Gemini.

== Eclipse details ==
Shown below is a table displaying details about this particular solar eclipse. It describes various parameters pertaining to this eclipse.

9 January 2001 Lunar Eclipse Parameters
Parameter	Value
Penumbral Magnitude	2.16314
Umbral Magnitude	1.19022
Gamma	0.37198
Sun Right Ascension	19h25m03.5s
Sun Declination	-21°59'58.3"
Sun Semi-Diameter	16'15.9"
Sun Equatorial Horizontal Parallax	08.9"
Moon Right Ascension	07h25m08.0s
Moon Declination	+22°22'46.0"
Moon Semi-Diameter	16'43.0"
Moon Equatorial Horizontal Parallax	1°01'21.1"
ΔT	64.1 s

== Eclipse season ==
This eclipse is part of an eclipse season, a period, roughly every six months, when eclipses occur. Only two (or occasionally three) eclipse seasons occur each year, and each season lasts about 35 days and repeats just short of six months (173 days) later; thus two full eclipse seasons always occur each year. Either two or three eclipses happen each eclipse season. In the sequence below, each eclipse is separated by a fortnight.

Eclipse season of December 2000–January 2001
25 December Descending node (new moon)	9 January Ascending node (full moon)
Partial solar eclipse Solar Saros 122	Total lunar eclipse Lunar Saros 134

== Related eclipses ==
=== Eclipses in 2001 ===
- A total lunar eclipse on 9 January.
- A total solar eclipse on June 21.
- A partial lunar eclipse on July 5.
- An annular solar eclipse on December 14.
- A penumbral lunar eclipse on December 30.

=== Metonic ===
- Preceded by: Lunar eclipse of March 24, 1997
- Followed by: Lunar eclipse of October 28, 2004

=== Tzolkinex ===
- Preceded by: Lunar eclipse of November 29, 1993
- Followed by: Lunar eclipse of February 21, 2008

=== Half-Saros ===
- Preceded by: Solar eclipse of January 4, 1992
- Followed by: Solar eclipse of January 15, 2010

=== Tritos ===
- Preceded by: Lunar eclipse of February 9, 1990
- Followed by: Lunar eclipse of December 10, 2011

=== Lunar Saros 134 ===
- Preceded by: Lunar eclipse of December 30, 1982
- Followed by: Lunar eclipse of January 21, 2019

=== Inex ===
- Preceded by: Lunar eclipse of January 30, 1972
- Followed by: Lunar eclipse of December 20, 2029

=== Triad ===
- Preceded by: Lunar eclipse of March 12, 1914
- Followed by: Lunar eclipse of November 10, 2087

=== Lunar eclipses of 1998–2002 ===
This eclipse is a member of a semester series. An eclipse in a semester series of lunar eclipses repeats approximately every 177 days and 4 hours (a semester) at alternating nodes of the Moon's orbit.

The penumbral lunar eclipses on March 13, 1998 and September 6, 1998 occur in the previous lunar year eclipse set, and the penumbral lunar eclipses on May 26, 2002 and November 20, 2002 occur in the next lunar year eclipse set.

Lunar eclipse series sets from 1998 to 2002
Descending node				Ascending node			
Saros	Date Viewing	Type Chart	Gamma	Saros	Date Viewing	Type Chart	Gamma
109	1998 Aug 08	Penumbral	1.4876	114	1999 Jan 31	Penumbral	−1.0190
119	1999 Jul 28	Partial	0.7863	124	2000 Jan 21	Total	−0.2957
129	2000 Jul 16	Total	0.0302	134	2001 Jan 09	Total	0.3720
139	2001 Jul 05	Partial	−0.7287	144	2001 Dec 30	Penumbral	1.0732
149	2002 Jun 24	Penumbral	−1.4440				

=== Saros 134 ===
This eclipse is a part of Saros series 134, repeating every 18 years, 11 days, and containing 72 events. The series started with a penumbral lunar eclipse on April 1, 1550. It contains partial eclipses from July 7, 1694 through October 13, 1856; total eclipses from October 25, 1874 through July 26, 2325; and a second set of partial eclipses from August 7, 2343 through November 12, 2505. The series ends at member 72 as a penumbral eclipse on May 28, 2830.

The longest duration of totality will be produced by member 38 at 100 minutes, 23 seconds on May 22, 2217. All eclipses in this series occur at the Moon’s ascending node of orbit.

Greatest	First			
The greatest eclipse of the series will occur on 2217 May 22, lasting 100 minutes, 23 seconds.	Penumbral	Partial	Total	Central
The greatest eclipse of the series will occur on 2217 May 22, lasting 100 minutes, 23 seconds.	1550 Apr 01	1694 Jul 07	1874 Oct 25	2127 Mar 28
The greatest eclipse of the series will occur on 2217 May 22, lasting 100 minutes, 23 seconds.	Last			
The greatest eclipse of the series will occur on 2217 May 22, lasting 100 minutes, 23 seconds.	Central	Total	Partial	Penumbral
The greatest eclipse of the series will occur on 2217 May 22, lasting 100 minutes, 23 seconds.	2289 Jul 04	2325 Jul 26	2505 Nov 12	2830 May 28

Eclipses are tabulated in three columns; every third eclipse in the same column is one exeligmos apart, so they all cast shadows over approximately the same parts of the Earth.

Series members 15–37 occur between 1801 and 2200:
15	16	17
1802 Sep 11	1820 Sep 22	1838 Oct 03
18	19	20
1856 Oct 13	1874 Oct 25	1892 Nov 04
21	22	23
1910 Nov 17	1928 Nov 27	1946 Dec 08
24	25	26
1964 Dec 19	1982 Dec 30	2001 Jan 09
27	28	29
2019 Jan 21	2037 Jan 31	2055 Feb 11
30	31	32
2073 Feb 22	2091 Mar 05	2109 Mar 17
33	34	35
2127 Mar 28	2145 Apr 07	2163 Apr 19
36	37	
2181 Apr 29	2199 May 10	

=== Tritos series ===
This eclipse is a part of a tritos cycle, repeating at alternating nodes every 135 synodic months (≈ 3986.63 days, or 11 years minus 1 month). Their appearance and longitude are irregular due to a lack of synchronization with the anomalistic month (period of perigee), but groupings of 3 tritos cycles (≈ 33 years minus 3 months) come close (≈ 434.044 anomalistic months), so eclipses are similar in these groupings.

Series members between 1801 and 2200
1804 Jul 22 (Saros 116)	1815 Jun 21 (Saros 117)	1826 May 21 (Saros 118)	1837 Apr 20 (Saros 119)	1848 Mar 19 (Saros 120)
1859 Feb 17 (Saros 121)	1870 Jan 17 (Saros 122)	1880 Dec 16 (Saros 123)	1891 Nov 16 (Saros 124)	1902 Oct 17 (Saros 125)
1913 Sep 15 (Saros 126)	1924 Aug 14 (Saros 127)	1935 Jul 16 (Saros 128)	1946 Jun 14 (Saros 129)	1957 May 13 (Saros 130)
1968 Apr 13 (Saros 131)	1979 Mar 13 (Saros 132)	1990 Feb 09 (Saros 133)	2001 Jan 09 (Saros 134)	2011 Dec 10 (Saros 135)
2022 Nov 08 (Saros 136)	2033 Oct 08 (Saros 137)	2044 Sep 07 (Saros 138)	2055 Aug 07 (Saros 139)	2066 Jul 07 (Saros 140)
2077 Jun 06 (Saros 141)	2088 May 05 (Saros 142)	2099 Apr 05 (Saros 143)	2110 Mar 06 (Saros 144)	2121 Feb 02 (Saros 145)
2132 Jan 02 (Saros 146)	2142 Dec 03 (Saros 147)	2153 Nov 01 (Saros 148)	2164 Sep 30 (Saros 149)	2175 Aug 31 (Saros 150)
2186 Jul 31 (Saros 151)	2197 Jun 29 (Saros 152)			

=== Inex series ===
This eclipse is a part of the long period inex cycle, repeating at alternating nodes, every 358 synodic months (≈ 10,571.95 days, or 29 years minus 20 days). Their appearance and longitude are irregular due to a lack of synchronization with the anomalistic month (period of perigee). However, groupings of 3 inex cycles (≈ 87 years minus 2 months) comes close (≈ 1,151.02 anomalistic months), so eclipses are similar in these groupings.

Series members between 1801 and 2200
1827 May 11 (Saros 128)	1856 Apr 20 (Saros 129)	1885 Mar 30 (Saros 130)
1914 Mar 12 (Saros 131)	1943 Feb 20 (Saros 132)	1972 Jan 30 (Saros 133)
2001 Jan 09 (Saros 134)	2029 Dec 20 (Saros 135)	2058 Nov 30 (Saros 136)
2087 Nov 10 (Saros 137)	2116 Oct 21 (Saros 138)	2145 Sep 30 (Saros 139)
2174 Sep 11 (Saros 140)

=== Half-Saros cycle ===
A lunar eclipse will be preceded and followed by solar eclipses by 9 years and 5.5 days (a half saros). This lunar eclipse is related to two annular solar eclipses of Solar Saros 141.

4 January 1992	15 January 2010

== See also ==
- List of lunar eclipses
- List of 21st-century lunar eclipses
