= 1964 lunar eclipse =

Two total lunar eclipses occurred in 1964:

- 25 June 1964 lunar eclipse
- 19 December 1964 lunar eclipse

== See also ==
- List of 20th-century lunar eclipses
- Lists of lunar eclipses
