= February 2055 lunar eclipse =

Astronomical event

- Total eclipse
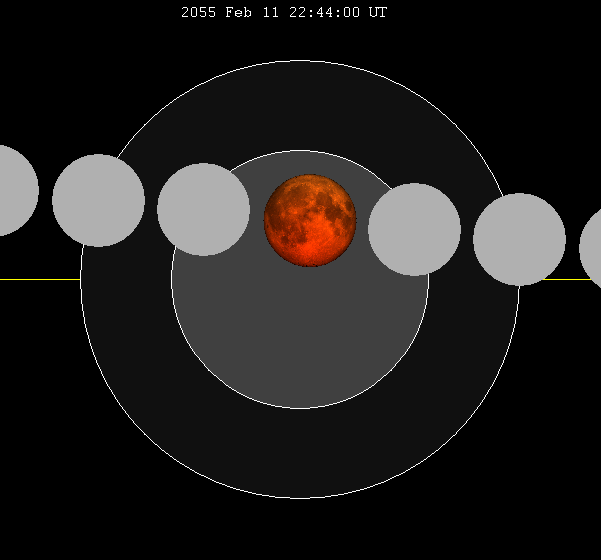
- The Moon's hourly motion shown right to left
- Date: February 11, 2055
- Gamma: 0.3526
- Magnitude: 1.2258
- Saros cycle: 134 (29 of 73)
- Totality: 66 minutes, 0 seconds
- Partiality: 198 minutes, 25 seconds
- Penumbral: 312 minutes, 52 seconds
Contacts (UTC)
- P1: 20:08:07
- U1: 21:05:22
- U2: 22:11:35
- Greatest: 22:44:34
- U3: 23:17:34
- U4: 0:23:47
- P4: 1:20:59

A total lunar eclipse will occur at the Moon’s ascending node of orbit on Thursday, February 11, 2055, with an umbral magnitude of 1.2258. A lunar eclipse occurs when the Moon moves into the Earth's shadow, causing the Moon to be darkened. A total lunar eclipse occurs when the Moon's near side entirely passes into the Earth's umbral shadow. Unlike a solar eclipse, which can only be viewed from a relatively small area of the world, a lunar eclipse may be viewed from anywhere on the night side of Earth. A total lunar eclipse can last up to nearly two hours, while a total solar eclipse lasts only a few minutes at any given place, because the Moon's shadow is smaller. Occurring only about 15 hours before perigee (on February 12, 2055, at 13:00 UTC), the Moon's apparent diameter will be larger.

This lunar eclipse will be the third of an almost tetrad, with the others being on February 22, 2054 (total); August 18, 2054 (total); and August 7, 2055 (partial).

== Visibility ==
The eclipse will be completely visible over Africa, Europe, and west, central, and south Asia, seen rising over much of North and South America and setting over east Asia and western Australia.

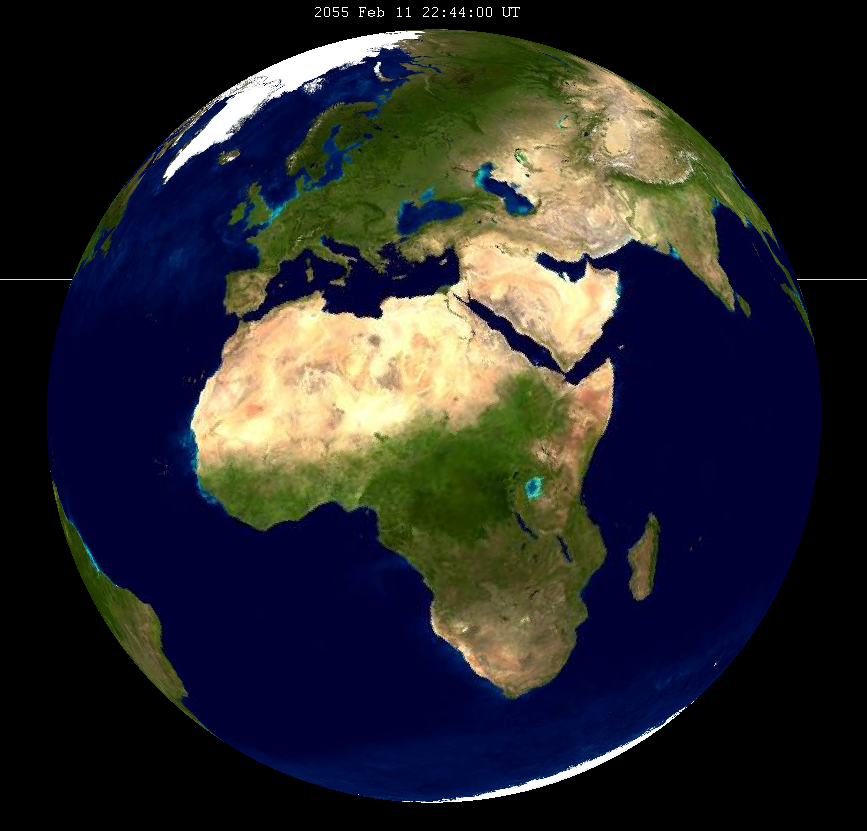
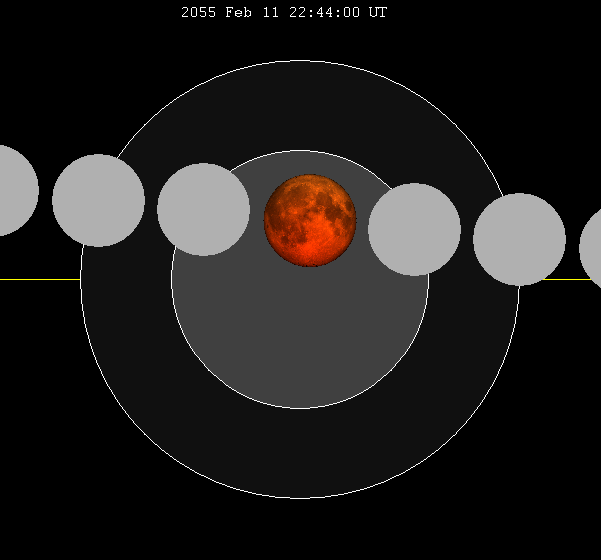

== Eclipse details ==
Shown below is a table displaying details about this particular solar eclipse. It describes various parameters pertaining to this eclipse.

February 11, 2055 Lunar Eclipse Parameters
Parameter	Value
Penumbral Magnitude	2.19816
Umbral Magnitude	1.22577
Gamma	0.35264
Sun Right Ascension	21h42m03.5s
Sun Declination	-13°47'10.8"
Sun Semi-Diameter	16'12.3"
Sun Equatorial Horizontal Parallax	08.9"
Moon Right Ascension	09h42m24.2s
Moon Declination	+14°08'09.1"
Moon Semi-Diameter	16'39.9"
Moon Equatorial Horizontal Parallax	1°01'09.9"
ΔT	88.5 s

== Eclipse season ==
This eclipse is part of an eclipse season, a period, roughly every six months, when eclipses occur. Only two (or occasionally three) eclipse seasons occur each year, and each season lasts about 35 days and repeats just short of six months (173 days) later; thus two full eclipse seasons always occur each year. Either two or three eclipses happen each eclipse season. In the sequence below, each eclipse is separated by a fortnight.

Eclipse season of August–September 2055
January 27 Descending node (new moon)	February 11 Ascending node (full moon)
Partial solar eclipse Solar Saros 122	Total lunar eclipse Lunar Saros 134

== Related eclipses ==
=== Eclipses in 2055 ===
- A partial solar eclipse on January 27.
- A total lunar eclipse on February 11.
- A total solar eclipse on July 24.
- A partial lunar eclipse on August 7.

=== Metonic ===
- Preceded by: Lunar eclipse of April 26, 2051
- Followed by: Lunar eclipse of November 30, 2058

=== Tzolkinex ===
- Preceded by: Lunar eclipse of January 1, 2048
- Followed by: Lunar eclipse of March 25, 2062

=== Half-Saros ===
- Preceded by: Solar eclipse of February 5, 2046
- Followed by: Solar eclipse of February 17, 2064

=== Tritos ===
- Preceded by: Lunar eclipse of March 13, 2044
- Followed by: Lunar eclipse of January 11, 2066

=== Lunar Saros 134 ===
- Preceded by: Lunar eclipse of January 31, 2037
- Followed by: Lunar eclipse of February 22, 2073

=== Inex ===
- Preceded by: Lunar eclipse of March 3, 2026
- Followed by: Lunar eclipse of January 22, 2084

=== Triad ===
- Preceded by: Lunar eclipse of April 13, 1968
- Followed by: Lunar eclipse of December 13, 2141

=== Lunar eclipses of 2053–2056 ===
This eclipse is a member of a semester series. An eclipse in a semester series of lunar eclipses repeats approximately every 177 days and 4 hours (a semester) at alternating nodes of the Moon's orbit.

The penumbral lunar eclipses on June 27, 2056 and December 22, 2056 occur in the next lunar year eclipse set.

Lunar eclipse series sets from 2053 to 2056
Ascending node				Descending node			
Saros	Date Viewing	Type Chart	Gamma	Saros	Date Viewing	Type Chart	Gamma
114	2053 Mar 04	Penumbral	−1.0530	119	2053 Aug 29	Penumbral	1.0165
124	2054 Feb 22	Total	−0.3242	129	2054 Aug 18	Total	0.2806
134	2055 Feb 11	Total	0.3526	139	2055 Aug 07	Partial	−0.4769
144	2056 Feb 01	Penumbral	1.0682	149	2056 Jul 26	Partial	−1.2048

=== Saros 134 ===
This eclipse is a part of Saros series 134, repeating every 18 years, 11 days, and containing 72 events. The series started with a penumbral lunar eclipse on April 1, 1550. It contains partial eclipses from July 7, 1694 through October 13, 1856; total eclipses from October 25, 1874 through July 26, 2325; and a second set of partial eclipses from August 7, 2343 through November 12, 2505. The series ends at member 72 as a penumbral eclipse on May 28, 2830.

The longest duration of totality will be produced by member 38 at 100 minutes, 23 seconds on May 22, 2217. All eclipses in this series occur at the Moon’s ascending node of orbit.

Greatest	First			
The greatest eclipse of the series will occur on 2217 May 22, lasting 100 minutes, 23 seconds.	Penumbral	Partial	Total	Central
The greatest eclipse of the series will occur on 2217 May 22, lasting 100 minutes, 23 seconds.	1550 Apr 01	1694 Jul 07	1874 Oct 25	2127 Mar 28
The greatest eclipse of the series will occur on 2217 May 22, lasting 100 minutes, 23 seconds.	Last			
The greatest eclipse of the series will occur on 2217 May 22, lasting 100 minutes, 23 seconds.	Central	Total	Partial	Penumbral
The greatest eclipse of the series will occur on 2217 May 22, lasting 100 minutes, 23 seconds.	2289 Jul 04	2325 Jul 26	2505 Nov 12	2830 May 28

Eclipses are tabulated in three columns; every third eclipse in the same column is one exeligmos apart, so they all cast shadows over approximately the same parts of the Earth.

Series members 15–37 occur between 1801 and 2200:
15	16	17
1802 Sep 11	1820 Sep 22	1838 Oct 03
18	19	20
1856 Oct 13	1874 Oct 25	1892 Nov 04
21	22	23
1910 Nov 17	1928 Nov 27	1946 Dec 08
24	25	26
1964 Dec 19	1982 Dec 30	2001 Jan 09
27	28	29
2019 Jan 21	2037 Jan 31	2055 Feb 11
30	31	32
2073 Feb 22	2091 Mar 05	2109 Mar 17
33	34	35
2127 Mar 28	2145 Apr 07	2163 Apr 19
36	37	
2181 Apr 29	2199 May 10	

=== Tritos series ===
This eclipse is a part of a tritos cycle, repeating at alternating nodes every 135 synodic months (≈ 3986.63 days, or 11 years minus 1 month). Their appearance and longitude are irregular due to a lack of synchronization with the anomalistic month (period of perigee), but groupings of 3 tritos cycles (≈ 33 years minus 3 months) come close (≈ 434.044 anomalistic months), so eclipses are similar in these groupings.

Series members between 1801 and 2200
1804 Jan 26 (Saros 111)	1814 Dec 26 (Saros 112)	1825 Nov 25 (Saros 113)	1836 Oct 24 (Saros 114)	1847 Sep 24 (Saros 115)
1858 Aug 24 (Saros 116)	1869 Jul 23 (Saros 117)	1880 Jun 22 (Saros 118)	1891 May 23 (Saros 119)	1902 Apr 22 (Saros 120)
1913 Mar 22 (Saros 121)	1924 Feb 20 (Saros 122)	1935 Jan 19 (Saros 123)	1945 Dec 19 (Saros 124)	1956 Nov 18 (Saros 125)
1967 Oct 18 (Saros 126)	1978 Sep 16 (Saros 127)	1989 Aug 17 (Saros 128)	2000 Jul 16 (Saros 129)	2011 Jun 15 (Saros 130)
2022 May 16 (Saros 131)	2033 Apr 14 (Saros 132)	2044 Mar 13 (Saros 133)	2055 Feb 11 (Saros 134)	2066 Jan 11 (Saros 135)
2076 Dec 10 (Saros 136)	2087 Nov 10 (Saros 137)	2098 Oct 10 (Saros 138)	2109 Sep 09 (Saros 139)	2120 Aug 09 (Saros 140)
2131 Jul 10 (Saros 141)	2142 Jun 08 (Saros 142)	2153 May 08 (Saros 143)	2164 Apr 07 (Saros 144)	2175 Mar 07 (Saros 145)
2186 Feb 04 (Saros 146)	2197 Jan 04 (Saros 147)			

=== Inex series ===
This eclipse is a part of the long period inex cycle, repeating at alternating nodes, every 358 synodic months (≈ 10,571.95 days, or 29 years minus 20 days). Their appearance and longitude are irregular due to a lack of synchronization with the anomalistic month (period of perigee). However, groupings of 3 inex cycles (≈ 87 years minus 2 months) comes close (≈ 1,151.02 anomalistic months), so eclipses are similar in these groupings.

Series members between 1801 and 2200
1823 Jul 23 (Saros 126)	1852 Jul 01 (Saros 127)	1881 Jun 12 (Saros 128)
1910 May 24 (Saros 129)	1939 May 03 (Saros 130)	1968 Apr 13 (Saros 131)
1997 Mar 24 (Saros 132)	2026 Mar 03 (Saros 133)	2055 Feb 11 (Saros 134)
2084 Jan 22 (Saros 135)	2113 Jan 02 (Saros 136)	2141 Dec 13 (Saros 137)
2170 Nov 23 (Saros 138)	2199 Nov 02 (Saros 139)	

=== Half-Saros cycle ===
A lunar eclipse will be preceded and followed by solar eclipses by 9 years and 5.5 days (a half saros). This lunar eclipse is related to two total solar eclipses of Solar Saros 141.

February 5, 2046	February 17, 2064

== See also ==
- List of lunar eclipses and List of 21st-century lunar eclipses
