= December 1946 lunar eclipse =

Total lunar eclipse December 8, 1946

- Total eclipse
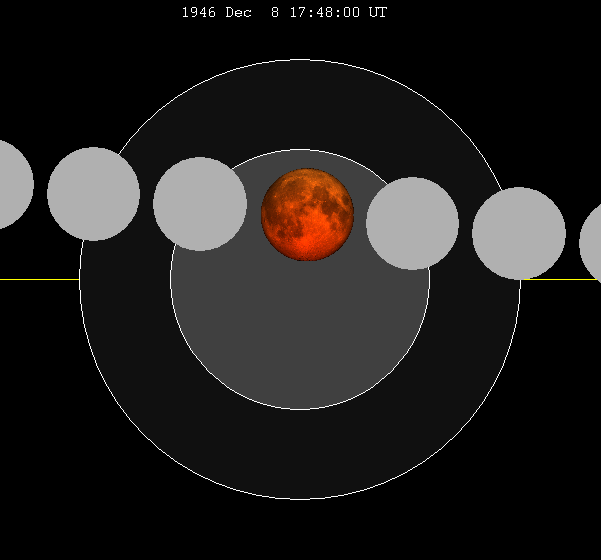
- The Moon's hourly motion shown right to left
- Date: December 8, 1946
- Gamma: 0.3864
- Magnitude: 1.1639
- Saros cycle: 134 (23 of 73)
- Totality: 57 minutes, 15 seconds
- Partiality: 194 minutes, 54 seconds
- Penumbral: 309 minutes, 29 seconds
Contacts (UTC)
- P1: 15:13:16
- U1: 16:10:34
- U2: 17:19:23
- Greatest: 17:48:01
- U3: 18:16:38
- U4: 19:25:28
- P4: 20:22:45

A total lunar eclipse occurred at the Moon’s ascending node of orbit on Sunday, December 8, 1946, with an umbral magnitude of 1.1639. A lunar eclipse occurs when the Moon moves into the Earth's shadow, causing the Moon to be darkened. A total lunar eclipse occurs when the Moon's near side entirely passes into the Earth's umbral shadow. Unlike a solar eclipse, which can only be viewed from a relatively small area of the world, a lunar eclipse may be viewed from anywhere on the night side of Earth. A total lunar eclipse can last up to nearly two hours, while a total solar eclipse lasts only a few minutes at any given place, because the Moon's shadow is smaller. Occurring only about 6.5 hours before perigee (on December 9, 1946, at 0:15 UTC), the Moon's apparent diameter was larger.

== Visibility ==
The eclipse was completely visible over central and eastern Europe, northeast Africa, Asia, and western Australia, seen rising over much of Africa and western Europe and setting over eastern Australia and northwestern North America.

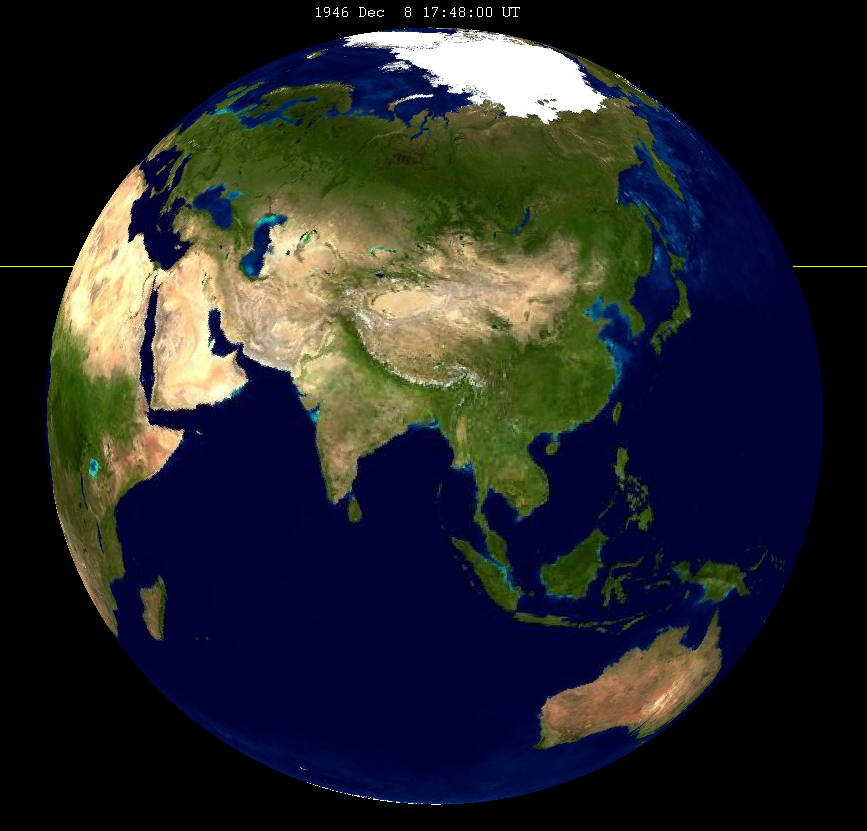
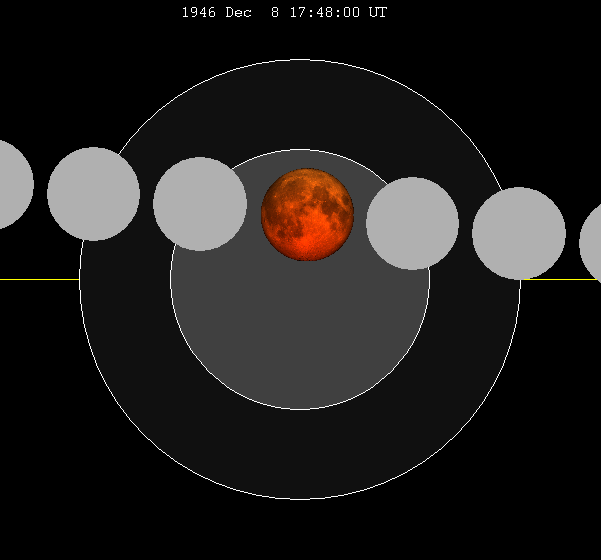

== Eclipse details ==
Shown below is a table displaying details about this particular lunar eclipse. It describes various parameters pertaining to this eclipse.

December 8, 1946 Lunar Eclipse Parameters
Parameter	Value
Penumbral Magnitude	2.13370
Umbral Magnitude	1.16390
Gamma	0.38643
Sun Right Ascension	16h59m23.8s
Sun Declination	-22°42'56.8"
Sun Semi-Diameter	16'14.4"
Sun Equatorial Horizontal Parallax	08.9"
Moon Right Ascension	04h59m03.0s
Moon Declination	+23°06'12.2"
Moon Semi-Diameter	16'44.7"
Moon Equatorial Horizontal Parallax	1°01'27.3"
ΔT	27.8 s

== Eclipse season ==
This eclipse is part of an eclipse season, a period, roughly every six months, when eclipses occur. Only two (or occasionally three) eclipse seasons occur each year, and each season lasts about 35 days and repeats just short of six months (173 days) later; thus two full eclipse seasons always occur each year. Either two or three eclipses happen each eclipse season. In the sequence below, each eclipse is separated by a fortnight.

Eclipse season of November–December 1946
November 23 Descending node (new moon)	December 8 Ascending node (full moon)
Partial solar eclipse Solar Saros 122	Total lunar eclipse Lunar Saros 134

== Related eclipses ==
=== Eclipses in 1946 ===
- A partial solar eclipse on January 3.
- A partial solar eclipse on May 30.
- A total lunar eclipse on June 14.
- A partial solar eclipse on June 29.
- A partial solar eclipse on November 23.
- A total lunar eclipse on December 8.

=== Metonic ===
- Preceded by: Lunar eclipse of February 20, 1943
- Followed by: Lunar eclipse of September 26, 1950

=== Tzolkinex ===
- Preceded by: Lunar eclipse of October 28, 1939
- Followed by: Lunar eclipse of January 19, 1954

=== Half-Saros ===
- Preceded by: Solar eclipse of December 2, 1937
- Followed by: Solar eclipse of December 14, 1955

=== Tritos ===
- Preceded by: Lunar eclipse of January 8, 1936
- Followed by: Lunar eclipse of November 7, 1957

=== Lunar Saros 134 ===
- Preceded by: Lunar eclipse of November 27, 1928
- Followed by: Lunar eclipse of December 19, 1964

=== Inex ===
- Preceded by: Lunar eclipse of December 28, 1917
- Followed by: Lunar eclipse of November 18, 1975

=== Triad ===
- Preceded by: Lunar eclipse of February 7, 1860
- Followed by: Lunar eclipse of October 8, 2033

=== Lunar eclipses of 1944–1947 ===
This eclipse is a member of a semester series. An eclipse in a semester series of lunar eclipses repeats approximately every 177 days and 4 hours (a semester) at alternating nodes of the Moon's orbit.

The penumbral lunar eclipses on February 9, 1944 and August 4, 1944 occur in the previous lunar year eclipse set.

Lunar eclipse series sets from 1944 to 1947
Descending node				Ascending node			
Saros	Date Viewing	Type Chart	Gamma	Saros	Date Viewing	Type Chart	Gamma
109	1944 Jul 06	Penumbral	1.2597	114	1944 Dec 29	Penumbral	−1.0115
119	1945 Jun 25	Partial	0.5370	124	1945 Dec 19	Total	−0.2845
129	1946 Jun 14	Total	−0.2324	134	1946 Dec 08	Total	0.3864
139	1947 Jun 03	Partial	−0.9850	144	1947 Nov 28	Penumbral	1.0838

=== Saros 134 ===
This eclipse is a part of Saros series 134, repeating every 18 years, 11 days, and containing 72 events. The series started with a penumbral lunar eclipse on April 1, 1550. It contains partial eclipses from July 7, 1694 through October 13, 1856; total eclipses from October 25, 1874 through July 26, 2325; and a second set of partial eclipses from August 7, 2343 through November 12, 2505. The series ends at member 72 as a penumbral eclipse on May 28, 2830.

The longest duration of totality will be produced by member 38 at 100 minutes, 23 seconds on May 22, 2217. All eclipses in this series occur at the Moon’s ascending node of orbit.

Greatest	First			
The greatest eclipse of the series will occur on 2217 May 22, lasting 100 minutes, 23 seconds.	Penumbral	Partial	Total	Central
The greatest eclipse of the series will occur on 2217 May 22, lasting 100 minutes, 23 seconds.	1550 Apr 01	1694 Jul 07	1874 Oct 25	2127 Mar 28
The greatest eclipse of the series will occur on 2217 May 22, lasting 100 minutes, 23 seconds.	Last			
The greatest eclipse of the series will occur on 2217 May 22, lasting 100 minutes, 23 seconds.	Central	Total	Partial	Penumbral
The greatest eclipse of the series will occur on 2217 May 22, lasting 100 minutes, 23 seconds.	2289 Jul 04	2325 Jul 26	2505 Nov 12	2830 May 28

Eclipses are tabulated in three columns; every third eclipse in the same column is one exeligmos apart, so they all cast shadows over approximately the same parts of the Earth.

Series members 15–37 occur between 1801 and 2200:
15	16	17
1802 Sep 11	1820 Sep 22	1838 Oct 03
18	19	20
1856 Oct 13	1874 Oct 25	1892 Nov 04
21	22	23
1910 Nov 17	1928 Nov 27	1946 Dec 08
24	25	26
1964 Dec 19	1982 Dec 30	2001 Jan 09
27	28	29
2019 Jan 21	2037 Jan 31	2055 Feb 11
30	31	32
2073 Feb 22	2091 Mar 05	2109 Mar 17
33	34	35
2127 Mar 28	2145 Apr 07	2163 Apr 19
36	37	
2181 Apr 29	2199 May 10	

=== Tritos series ===
This eclipse is a part of a tritos cycle, repeating at alternating nodes every 135 synodic months (≈ 3986.63 days, or 11 years minus 1 month). Their appearance and longitude are irregular due to a lack of synchronization with the anomalistic month (period of perigee), but groupings of 3 tritos cycles (≈ 33 years minus 3 months) come close (≈ 434.044 anomalistic months), so eclipses are similar in these groupings.

Series members between 1801 and 2187
1805 Jan 15 (Saros 121)	1815 Dec 16 (Saros 122)	1826 Nov 14 (Saros 123)	1837 Oct 13 (Saros 124)	1848 Sep 13 (Saros 125)
1859 Aug 13 (Saros 126)	1870 Jul 12 (Saros 127)	1881 Jun 12 (Saros 128)	1892 May 11 (Saros 129)	1903 Apr 12 (Saros 130)
1914 Mar 12 (Saros 131)	1925 Feb 08 (Saros 132)	1936 Jan 08 (Saros 133)	1946 Dec 08 (Saros 134)	1957 Nov 07 (Saros 135)
1968 Oct 06 (Saros 136)	1979 Sep 06 (Saros 137)	1990 Aug 06 (Saros 138)	2001 Jul 05 (Saros 139)	2012 Jun 04 (Saros 140)
2023 May 05 (Saros 141)	2034 Apr 03 (Saros 142)	2045 Mar 03 (Saros 143)	2056 Feb 01 (Saros 144)	2066 Dec 31 (Saros 145)
2077 Nov 29 (Saros 146)	2088 Oct 30 (Saros 147)	2099 Sep 29 (Saros 148)	2110 Aug 29 (Saros 149)	2121 Jul 30 (Saros 150)
2132 Jun 28 (Saros 151)	2143 May 28 (Saros 152)	2154 Apr 28 (Saros 153)		
2187 Jan 24 (Saros 156)

=== Inex series ===
This eclipse is a part of the long period inex cycle, repeating at alternating nodes, every 358 synodic months (≈ 10,571.95 days, or 29 years minus 20 days). Their appearance and longitude are irregular due to a lack of synchronization with the anomalistic month (period of perigee). However, groupings of 3 inex cycles (≈ 87 years minus 2 months) comes close (≈ 1,151.02 anomalistic months), so eclipses are similar in these groupings.

Series members between 1801 and 2200
1802 Mar 19 (Saros 129)	1831 Feb 26 (Saros 130)	1860 Feb 07 (Saros 131)
1889 Jan 17 (Saros 132)	1917 Dec 28 (Saros 133)	1946 Dec 08 (Saros 134)
1975 Nov 18 (Saros 135)	2004 Oct 28 (Saros 136)	2033 Oct 08 (Saros 137)
2062 Sep 18 (Saros 138)	2091 Aug 29 (Saros 139)	2120 Aug 09 (Saros 140)
2149 Jul 20 (Saros 141)	2178 Jun 30 (Saros 142)	

=== Half-Saros cycle ===
A lunar eclipse will be preceded and followed by solar eclipses by 9 years and 5.5 days (a half saros). This lunar eclipse is related to two total solar eclipses of Solar Saros 141.

December 2, 1937	December 14, 1955

== See also ==
- List of lunar eclipses
- List of 20th-century lunar eclipses
