= December 1964 lunar eclipse =

Total lunar eclipse December 19, 1964

- Total eclipse
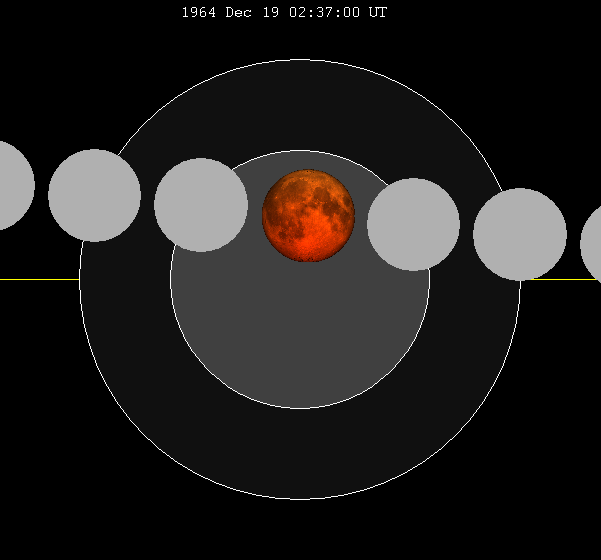
- The Moon's hourly motion shown right to left
- Date: December 19, 1964
- Gamma: 0.3801
- Magnitude: 1.1748
- Saros cycle: 134 (24 of 73)
- Totality: 58 minutes, 56 seconds
- Partiality: 195 minutes, 28 seconds
- Penumbral: 310 minutes, 5 seconds
Contacts (UTC)
- P1: 0:02:16
- U1: 0:59:35
- U2: 2:07:50
- Greatest: 2:37:18
- U3: 3:06:46
- U4: 4:15:02
- P4: 5:12:20

A total lunar eclipse occurred at the Moon’s ascending node of orbit on Saturday, December 19, 1964, with an umbral magnitude of 1.1748. A lunar eclipse occurs when the Moon moves into the Earth's shadow, causing the Moon to be darkened. A total lunar eclipse occurs when the Moon's near side entirely passes into the Earth's umbral shadow. Unlike a solar eclipse, which can only be viewed from a relatively small area of the world, a lunar eclipse may be viewed from anywhere on the night side of Earth. A total lunar eclipse can last up to nearly two hours, while a total solar eclipse lasts only a few minutes at any given place, because the Moon's shadow is smaller. Occurring only about 8.5 hours before perigee (on December 19, 1964, at 11:05 UTC), the Moon's apparent diameter was larger.

The eclipse afforded astrophysicist J. M. Saari the opportunity to make infrared pyrometric scans of the lunar surface with improved equipment, following up on Richard W. Shorthill's discovery of "hot spots" in the Tycho crater during the March 13, 1960 eclipse.

== Visibility ==
The eclipse was completely visible over North and South America, west Africa, Europe, and north Asia, seen rising over the eastern Pacific Ocean and setting over southern and east Africa and the western half of Asia.

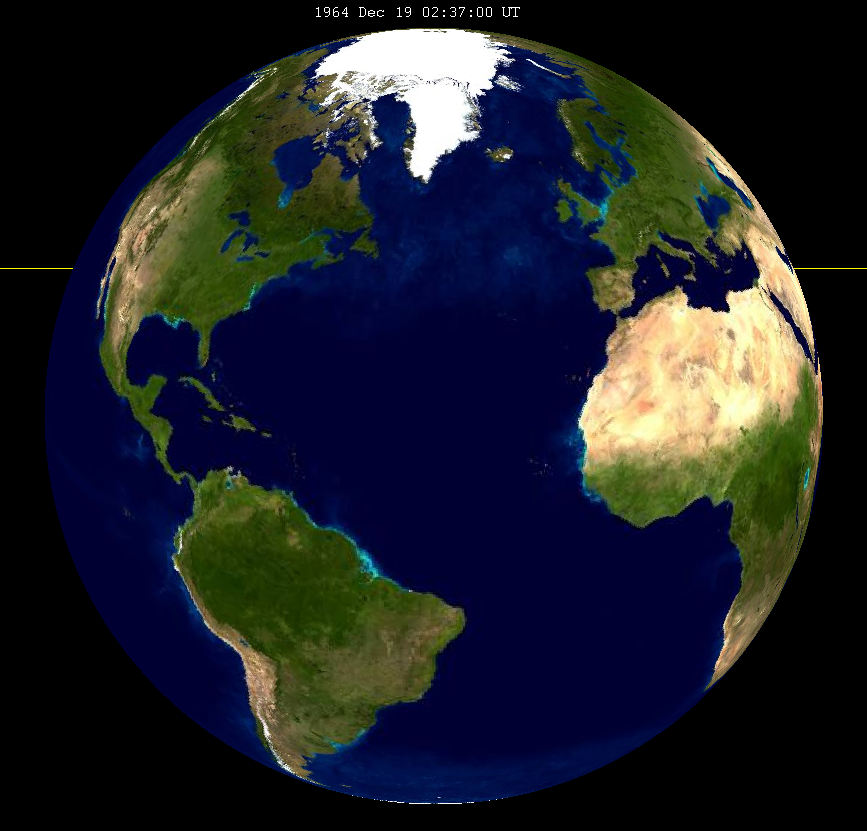
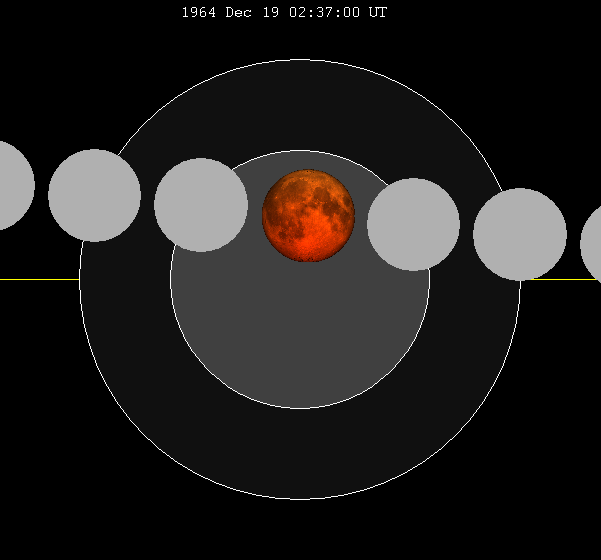

== Eclipse details ==
Shown below is a table displaying details about this particular lunar eclipse. It describes various parameters pertaining to this eclipse.

December 19, 1964 Lunar Eclipse Parameters
Parameter	Value
Penumbral Magnitude	2.14609
Umbral Magnitude	1.17483
Gamma	0.38008
Sun Right Ascension	17h47m56.6s
Sun Declination	-23°24'54.1"
Sun Semi-Diameter	16'15.4"
Sun Equatorial Horizontal Parallax	08.9"
Moon Right Ascension	05h47m44.4s
Moon Declination	+23°48'04.8"
Moon Semi-Diameter	16'44.3"
Moon Equatorial Horizontal Parallax	1°01'25.8"
ΔT	35.8 s

== Eclipse season ==
This eclipse is part of an eclipse season, a period, roughly every six months, when eclipses occur. Only two (or occasionally three) eclipse seasons occur each year, and each season lasts about 35 days and repeats just short of six months (173 days) later; thus two full eclipse seasons always occur each year. Either two or three eclipses happen each eclipse season. In the sequence below, each eclipse is separated by a fortnight.

Eclipse season of December 1964
December 4 Descending node (new moon)	December 19 Ascending node (full moon)
Partial solar eclipse Solar Saros 122	Total lunar eclipse Lunar Saros 134

== Related eclipses ==
=== Eclipses in 1964 ===
- A partial solar eclipse on January 14.
- A partial solar eclipse on June 10.
- A total lunar eclipse on June 25.
- A partial solar eclipse on July 9.
- A partial solar eclipse on December 4.
- A total lunar eclipse on December 19.

=== Metonic ===
- Preceded by: Lunar eclipse of March 2, 1961
- Followed by: Lunar eclipse of October 6, 1968

=== Tzolkinex ===
- Preceded by: Lunar eclipse of November 7, 1957
- Followed by: Lunar eclipse of January 30, 1972

=== Half-Saros ===
- Preceded by: Solar eclipse of December 14, 1955
- Followed by: Solar eclipse of December 24, 1973

=== Tritos ===
- Preceded by: Lunar eclipse of January 19, 1954
- Followed by: Lunar eclipse of November 18, 1975

=== Lunar Saros 134 ===
- Preceded by: Lunar eclipse of December 8, 1946
- Followed by: Lunar eclipse of December 30, 1982

=== Inex ===
- Preceded by: Lunar eclipse of January 8, 1936
- Followed by: Lunar eclipse of November 29, 1993

=== Triad ===
- Preceded by: Lunar eclipse of February 17, 1878
- Followed by: Lunar eclipse of October 19, 2051

=== Lunar eclipses of 1962–1965 ===
This eclipse is a member of a semester series. An eclipse in a semester series of lunar eclipses repeats approximately every 177 days and 4 hours (a semester) at alternating nodes of the Moon's orbit.

The penumbral lunar eclipses on February 19, 1962 and August 15, 1962 occur in the previous lunar year eclipse set.

Lunar eclipse series sets from 1962 to 1965
Descending node				Ascending node			
Saros	Date Viewing	Type Chart	Gamma	Saros	Date Viewing	Type Chart	Gamma
109	1962 Jul 17	Penumbral	1.3371	114	1963 Jan 09	Penumbral	−1.0128
119	1963 Jul 06	Partial	0.6197	124	1963 Dec 30	Total	−0.2889
129	1964 Jun 25	Total	−0.1461	134	1964 Dec 19	Total	0.3801
139	1965 Jun 14	Partial	−0.9006	144	1965 Dec 08	Penumbral	1.0775

=== Saros 134 ===
This eclipse is a part of Saros series 134, repeating every 18 years, 11 days, and containing 72 events. The series started with a penumbral lunar eclipse on April 1, 1550. It contains partial eclipses from July 7, 1694 through October 13, 1856; total eclipses from October 25, 1874 through July 26, 2325; and a second set of partial eclipses from August 7, 2343 through November 12, 2505. The series ends at member 72 as a penumbral eclipse on May 28, 2830.

The longest duration of totality will be produced by member 38 at 100 minutes, 23 seconds on May 22, 2217. All eclipses in this series occur at the Moon’s ascending node of orbit.

Greatest	First			
The greatest eclipse of the series will occur on 2217 May 22, lasting 100 minutes, 23 seconds.	Penumbral	Partial	Total	Central
The greatest eclipse of the series will occur on 2217 May 22, lasting 100 minutes, 23 seconds.	1550 Apr 01	1694 Jul 07	1874 Oct 25	2127 Mar 28
The greatest eclipse of the series will occur on 2217 May 22, lasting 100 minutes, 23 seconds.	Last			
The greatest eclipse of the series will occur on 2217 May 22, lasting 100 minutes, 23 seconds.	Central	Total	Partial	Penumbral
The greatest eclipse of the series will occur on 2217 May 22, lasting 100 minutes, 23 seconds.	2289 Jul 04	2325 Jul 26	2505 Nov 12	2830 May 28

Eclipses are tabulated in three columns; every third eclipse in the same column is one exeligmos apart, so they all cast shadows over approximately the same parts of the Earth.

Series members 15–37 occur between 1801 and 2200:
15	16	17
1802 Sep 11	1820 Sep 22	1838 Oct 03
18	19	20
1856 Oct 13	1874 Oct 25	1892 Nov 04
21	22	23
1910 Nov 17	1928 Nov 27	1946 Dec 08
24	25	26
1964 Dec 19	1982 Dec 30	2001 Jan 09
27	28	29
2019 Jan 21	2037 Jan 31	2055 Feb 11
30	31	32
2073 Feb 22	2091 Mar 05	2109 Mar 17
33	34	35
2127 Mar 28	2145 Apr 07	2163 Apr 19
36	37	
2181 Apr 29	2199 May 10	

=== Tritos series ===
This eclipse is a part of a tritos cycle, repeating at alternating nodes every 135 synodic months (≈ 3986.63 days, or 11 years minus 1 month). Their appearance and longitude are irregular due to a lack of synchronization with the anomalistic month (period of perigee), but groupings of 3 tritos cycles (≈ 33 years minus 3 months) come close (≈ 434.044 anomalistic months), so eclipses are similar in these groupings.

Series members between 1801 and 2200
1801 Mar 30 (Saros 119)	1812 Feb 27 (Saros 120)	1823 Jan 26 (Saros 121)	1833 Dec 26 (Saros 122)	1844 Nov 24 (Saros 123)
1855 Oct 25 (Saros 124)	1866 Sep 24 (Saros 125)	1877 Aug 23 (Saros 126)	1888 Jul 23 (Saros 127)	1899 Jun 23 (Saros 128)
1910 May 24 (Saros 129)	1921 Apr 22 (Saros 130)	1932 Mar 22 (Saros 131)	1943 Feb 20 (Saros 132)	1954 Jan 19 (Saros 133)
1964 Dec 19 (Saros 134)	1975 Nov 18 (Saros 135)	1986 Oct 17 (Saros 136)	1997 Sep 16 (Saros 137)	2008 Aug 16 (Saros 138)
2019 Jul 16 (Saros 139)	2030 Jun 15 (Saros 140)	2041 May 16 (Saros 141)	2052 Apr 14 (Saros 142)	2063 Mar 14 (Saros 143)
2074 Feb 11 (Saros 144)	2085 Jan 10 (Saros 145)	2095 Dec 11 (Saros 146)	2106 Nov 11 (Saros 147)	2117 Oct 10 (Saros 148)
2128 Sep 09 (Saros 149)	2139 Aug 10 (Saros 150)	2150 Jul 09 (Saros 151)	2161 Jun 08 (Saros 152)	2172 May 08 (Saros 153)
	2194 Mar 07 (Saros 155)			

=== Inex series ===
This eclipse is a part of the long period inex cycle, repeating at alternating nodes, every 358 synodic months (≈ 10,571.95 days, or 29 years minus 20 days). Their appearance and longitude are irregular due to a lack of synchronization with the anomalistic month (period of perigee). However, groupings of 3 inex cycles (≈ 87 years minus 2 months) comes close (≈ 1,151.02 anomalistic months), so eclipses are similar in these groupings.

Series members between 1801 and 2200
1820 Mar 29 (Saros 129)	1849 Mar 09 (Saros 130)	1878 Feb 17 (Saros 131)
1907 Jan 29 (Saros 132)	1936 Jan 08 (Saros 133)	1964 Dec 19 (Saros 134)
1993 Nov 29 (Saros 135)	2022 Nov 08 (Saros 136)	2051 Oct 19 (Saros 137)
2080 Sep 29 (Saros 138)	2109 Sep 09 (Saros 139)	2138 Aug 20 (Saros 140)
2167 Aug 01 (Saros 141)	2196 Jul 10 (Saros 142)	

=== Half-Saros cycle ===
A lunar eclipse will be preceded and followed by solar eclipses by 9 years and 5.5 days (a half saros). This lunar eclipse is related to two total solar eclipses of Solar Saros 141.

December 14, 1955	December 24, 1973

== See also ==
- List of lunar eclipses
- List of 20th-century lunar eclipses
