= June 1946 lunar eclipse =

Total lunar eclipse June 14, 1946

- Total eclipse
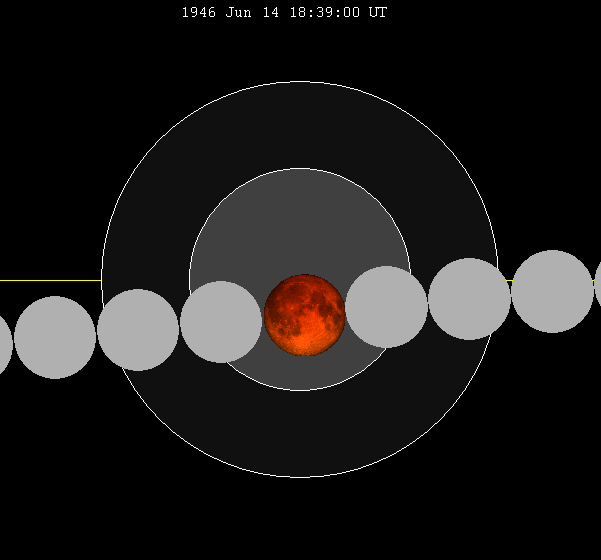
- The Moon's hourly motion shown right to left
- Date: June 14, 1946
- Gamma: −0.2324
- Magnitude: 1.3983
- Saros cycle: 129 (34 of 71)
- Totality: 91 minutes, 9 seconds
- Partiality: 229 minutes, 3 seconds
- Penumbral: 369 minutes, 12 seconds
Contacts (UTC)
- P1: 15:34:13
- U1: 16:44:19
- U2: 17:54:16
- Greatest: 18:38:49
- U3: 19:24:24
- U4: 20:33:21
- P4: 21:43:24

A total lunar eclipse occurred at the Moon’s descending node of orbit on Friday, June 14, 1946, with an umbral magnitude of 1.3983. It was a central lunar eclipse, in which part of the Moon passed through the center of the Earth's shadow. A lunar eclipse occurs when the Moon moves into the Earth's shadow, causing the Moon to be darkened. A total lunar eclipse occurs when the Moon's near side entirely passes into the Earth's umbral shadow. Unlike a solar eclipse, which can only be viewed from a relatively small area of the world, a lunar eclipse may be viewed from anywhere on the night side of Earth. A total lunar eclipse can last up to nearly two hours, while a total solar eclipse lasts only a few minutes at any given place, because the Moon's shadow is smaller. Occurring about 1.8 days after the apogee (on June 12, 1946, at 22:40 UTC), the Moon's apparent diameter was smaller.

This was the first central lunar eclipse of Lunar Saros 129.

== Visibility ==
The eclipse was completely visible over east Africa, central, south, and southeast Asia, western Australia, and Antarctica, seen rising over much of Africa, eastern South America, Europe, and west Asia and setting over northeast Asia and eastern Australia.

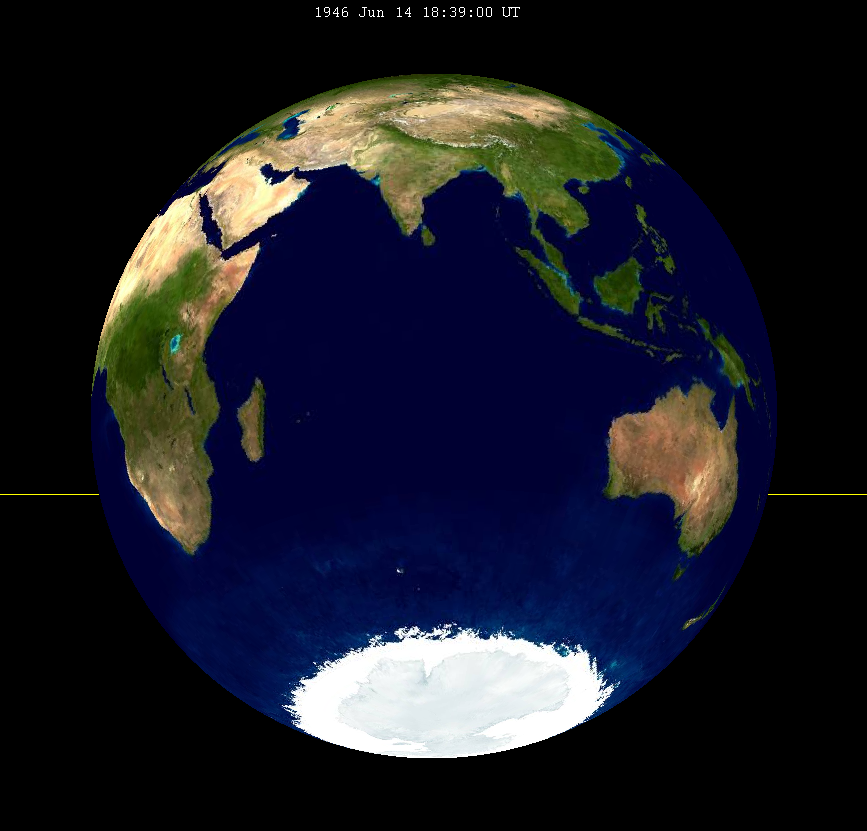
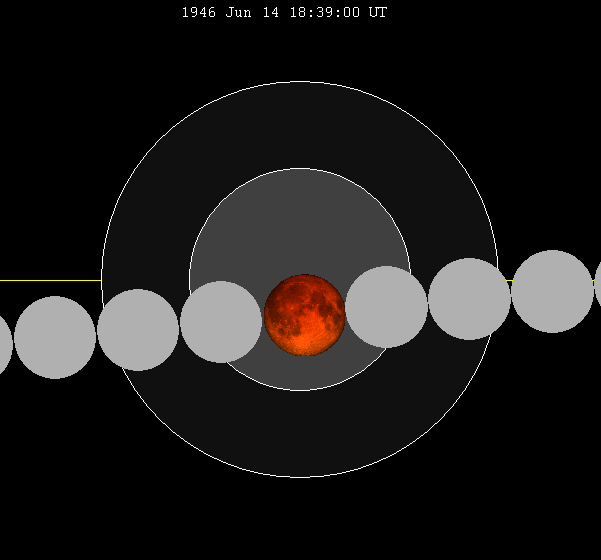

== Eclipse details ==
Shown below is a table displaying details about this particular solar eclipse. It describes various parameters pertaining to this eclipse.

June 14, 1946 Lunar Eclipse Parameters
Parameter	Value
Penumbral Magnitude	2.46538
Umbral Magnitude	1.39833
Gamma	−0.23239
Sun Right Ascension	05h29m50.7s
Sun Declination	+23°15'55.5"
Sun Semi-Diameter	15'44.7"
Sun Equatorial Horizontal Parallax	08.7"
Moon Right Ascension	17h29m42.4s
Moon Declination	-23°28'21.8"
Moon Semi-Diameter	14'45.4"
Moon Equatorial Horizontal Parallax	0°54'09.4"
ΔT	27.6 s

== Eclipse season ==
This eclipse is part of an eclipse season, a period, roughly every six months, when eclipses occur. Only two (or occasionally three) eclipse seasons occur each year, and each season lasts about 35 days and repeats just short of six months (173 days) later; thus two full eclipse seasons always occur each year. Either two or three eclipses happen each eclipse season. In the sequence below, each eclipse is separated by a fortnight. The first and last eclipse in this sequence is separated by one synodic month.

Eclipse season of May–June 1946
May 30 Ascending node (new moon)	June 14 Descending node (full moon)	June 29 Ascending node (new moon)
Partial solar eclipse Solar Saros 117	Total lunar eclipse Lunar Saros 129	Partial solar eclipse Solar Saros 155

== Related eclipses ==
=== Eclipses in 1946 ===
- A partial solar eclipse on January 3.
- A partial solar eclipse on May 30.
- A total lunar eclipse on June 14.
- A partial solar eclipse on June 29.
- A partial solar eclipse on November 23.
- A total lunar eclipse on December 8.

=== Metonic ===
- Preceded by: Lunar eclipse of August 26, 1942
- Followed by: Lunar eclipse of April 2, 1950

=== Tzolkinex ===
- Preceded by: Lunar eclipse of May 3, 1939
- Followed by: Lunar eclipse of July 26, 1953

=== Half-Saros ===
- Preceded by: Solar eclipse of June 8, 1937
- Followed by: Solar eclipse of June 20, 1955

=== Tritos ===
- Preceded by: Lunar eclipse of July 16, 1935
- Followed by: Lunar eclipse of May 13, 1957

=== Lunar Saros 129 ===
- Preceded by: Lunar eclipse of June 3, 1928
- Followed by: Lunar eclipse of June 25, 1964

=== Inex ===
- Preceded by: Lunar eclipse of July 4, 1917
- Followed by: Lunar eclipse of May 25, 1975

=== Triad ===
- Preceded by: Lunar eclipse of August 13, 1859
- Followed by: Lunar eclipse of April 14, 2033

=== Lunar eclipses of 1944–1947 ===
This eclipse is a member of a semester series. An eclipse in a semester series of lunar eclipses repeats approximately every 177 days and 4 hours (a semester) at alternating nodes of the Moon's orbit.

The penumbral lunar eclipses on February 9, 1944 and August 4, 1944 occur in the previous lunar year eclipse set.

Lunar eclipse series sets from 1944 to 1947
Descending node				Ascending node			
Saros	Date Viewing	Type Chart	Gamma	Saros	Date Viewing	Type Chart	Gamma
109	1944 Jul 06	Penumbral	1.2597	114	1944 Dec 29	Penumbral	−1.0115
119	1945 Jun 25	Partial	0.5370	124	1945 Dec 19	Total	−0.2845
129	1946 Jun 14	Total	−0.2324	134	1946 Dec 08	Total	0.3864
139	1947 Jun 03	Partial	−0.9850	144	1947 Nov 28	Penumbral	1.0838

=== Saros 129 ===
This eclipse is a part of Saros series 129, repeating every 18 years, 11 days, and containing 71 events. The series started with a penumbral lunar eclipse on June 10, 1351. It contains partial eclipses from September 26, 1531 through May 11, 1892; total eclipses from May 24, 1910 through September 8, 2090; and a second set of partial eclipses from September 20, 2108 through April 26, 2469. The series ends at member 71 as a penumbral eclipse on July 24, 2613.

The longest duration of totality was produced by member 37 at 106 minutes, 24 seconds on July 16, 2000. All eclipses in this series occur at the Moon’s descending node of orbit.

Greatest	First			
The greatest eclipse of the series occurred on 2000 Jul 16, lasting 106 minutes, 24 seconds.	Penumbral	Partial	Total	Central
The greatest eclipse of the series occurred on 2000 Jul 16, lasting 106 minutes, 24 seconds.	1351 Jun 10	1531 Sep 26	1910 May 24	1946 Jun 14
The greatest eclipse of the series occurred on 2000 Jul 16, lasting 106 minutes, 24 seconds.	Last			
The greatest eclipse of the series occurred on 2000 Jul 16, lasting 106 minutes, 24 seconds.	Central	Total	Partial	Penumbral
The greatest eclipse of the series occurred on 2000 Jul 16, lasting 106 minutes, 24 seconds.	2036 Aug 07	2090 Sep 08	2469 Apr 26	2613 Jul 24

Eclipses are tabulated in three columns; every third eclipse in the same column is one exeligmos apart, so they all cast shadows over approximately the same parts of the Earth.

Series members 26–48 occur between 1801 and 2200:
26	27	28
1802 Mar 19	1820 Mar 29	1838 Apr 10
29	30	31
1856 Apr 20	1874 May 01	1892 May 11
32	33	34
1910 May 24	1928 Jun 03	1946 Jun 14
35	36	37
1964 Jun 25	1982 Jul 06	2000 Jul 16
38	39	40
2018 Jul 27	2036 Aug 07	2054 Aug 18
41	42	43
2072 Aug 28	2090 Sep 08	2108 Sep 20
44	45	46
2126 Oct 01	2144 Oct 11	2162 Oct 23
47	48	
2180 Nov 02	2198 Nov 13	

=== Tritos series ===
This eclipse is a part of a tritos cycle, repeating at alternating nodes every 135 synodic months (≈ 3986.63 days, or 11 years minus 1 month). Their appearance and longitude are irregular due to a lack of synchronization with the anomalistic month (period of perigee), but groupings of 3 tritos cycles (≈ 33 years minus 3 months) come close (≈ 434.044 anomalistic months), so eclipses are similar in these groupings.

Series members between 1801 and 2200
1804 Jul 22 (Saros 116)	1815 Jun 21 (Saros 117)	1826 May 21 (Saros 118)	1837 Apr 20 (Saros 119)	1848 Mar 19 (Saros 120)
1859 Feb 17 (Saros 121)	1870 Jan 17 (Saros 122)	1880 Dec 16 (Saros 123)	1891 Nov 16 (Saros 124)	1902 Oct 17 (Saros 125)
1913 Sep 15 (Saros 126)	1924 Aug 14 (Saros 127)	1935 Jul 16 (Saros 128)	1946 Jun 14 (Saros 129)	1957 May 13 (Saros 130)
1968 Apr 13 (Saros 131)	1979 Mar 13 (Saros 132)	1990 Feb 09 (Saros 133)	2001 Jan 09 (Saros 134)	2011 Dec 10 (Saros 135)
2022 Nov 08 (Saros 136)	2033 Oct 08 (Saros 137)	2044 Sep 07 (Saros 138)	2055 Aug 07 (Saros 139)	2066 Jul 07 (Saros 140)
2077 Jun 06 (Saros 141)	2088 May 05 (Saros 142)	2099 Apr 05 (Saros 143)	2110 Mar 06 (Saros 144)	2121 Feb 02 (Saros 145)
2132 Jan 02 (Saros 146)	2142 Dec 03 (Saros 147)	2153 Nov 01 (Saros 148)	2164 Sep 30 (Saros 149)	2175 Aug 31 (Saros 150)
2186 Jul 31 (Saros 151)	2197 Jun 29 (Saros 152)			

=== Inex series ===
This eclipse is a part of the long period inex cycle, repeating at alternating nodes, every 358 synodic months (≈ 10,571.95 days, or 29 years minus 20 days). Their appearance and longitude are irregular due to a lack of synchronization with the anomalistic month (period of perigee). However, groupings of 3 inex cycles (≈ 87 years minus 2 months) comes close (≈ 1,151.02 anomalistic months), so eclipses are similar in these groupings.

Series members between 1801 and 2200
1801 Sep 22 (Saros 124)	1830 Sep 02 (Saros 125)	1859 Aug 13 (Saros 126)
1888 Jul 23 (Saros 127)	1917 Jul 04 (Saros 128)	1946 Jun 14 (Saros 129)
1975 May 25 (Saros 130)	2004 May 04 (Saros 131)	2033 Apr 14 (Saros 132)
2062 Mar 25 (Saros 133)	2091 Mar 05 (Saros 134)	2120 Feb 14 (Saros 135)
2149 Jan 23 (Saros 136)	2178 Jan 04 (Saros 137)	

=== Half-Saros cycle ===
A lunar eclipse will be preceded and followed by solar eclipses by 9 years and 5.5 days (a half saros). This lunar eclipse is related to two total solar eclipses of Solar Saros 136.

June 8, 1937	June 20, 1955

== See also ==
- List of lunar eclipses
- List of 20th-century lunar eclipses
