= December 1982 lunar eclipse =

Total lunar eclipse December 30, 1982

- Total eclipse
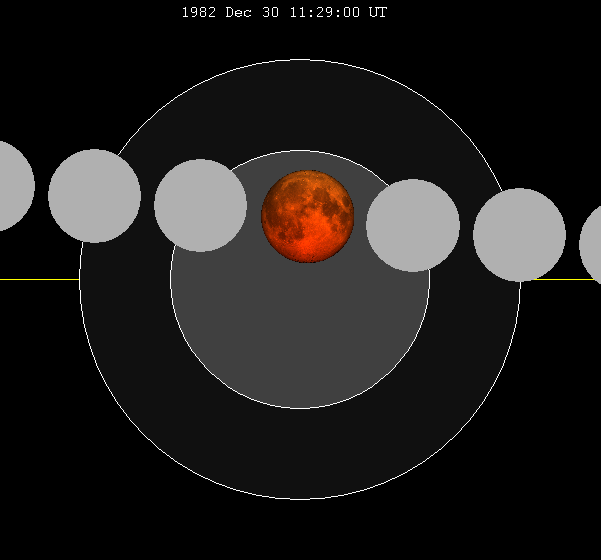
- The Moon's hourly motion shown right to left
- Date: December 30, 1982
- Gamma: 0.3758
- Magnitude: 1.1822
- Saros cycle: 134 (25 of 73)
- Totality: 60 minutes, 3 seconds
- Partiality: 195 minutes, 53 seconds
- Penumbral: 310 minutes, 34 seconds
Contacts (UTC)
- P1: 8:53:27
- U1: 9:50:48
- U2: 10:58:43
- Greatest: 11:28:44
- U3: 11:58:46
- U4: 13:06:41
- P4: 14:04:01

A total lunar eclipse occurred at the Moon’s ascending node of orbit on Thursday, December 30, 1982, with an umbral magnitude of 1.1822. A lunar eclipse occurs when the Moon moves into the Earth's shadow, causing the Moon to be darkened. A total lunar eclipse occurs when the Moon's near side entirely passes into the Earth's umbral shadow. Unlike a solar eclipse, which can only be viewed from a relatively small area of the world, a lunar eclipse may be viewed from anywhere on the night side of Earth. A total lunar eclipse can last up to nearly two hours, while a total solar eclipse lasts only a few minutes at any given place, because the Moon's shadow is smaller. Occurring only about 10.5 hours before perigee (on December 30, 1982, at 22:00 UTC), the Moon's apparent diameter was larger.

This was a supermoon since perigee was on the same day. It was also a blue moon, the second full moon of December for the Eastern Hemisphere where the previous full moon was on December 1. Since total lunar eclipses are also known as blood moons, this combination (which would not recur until January 31, 2018) is known as a super blue blood moon. The eclipse was abnormally dark.

== Visibility ==
The eclipse was completely visible over north and northeast Asia, western and central North America, and the central Pacific Ocean, seen rising over northern Europe, much of Asia, and Australia and setting over eastern North America and western South America.

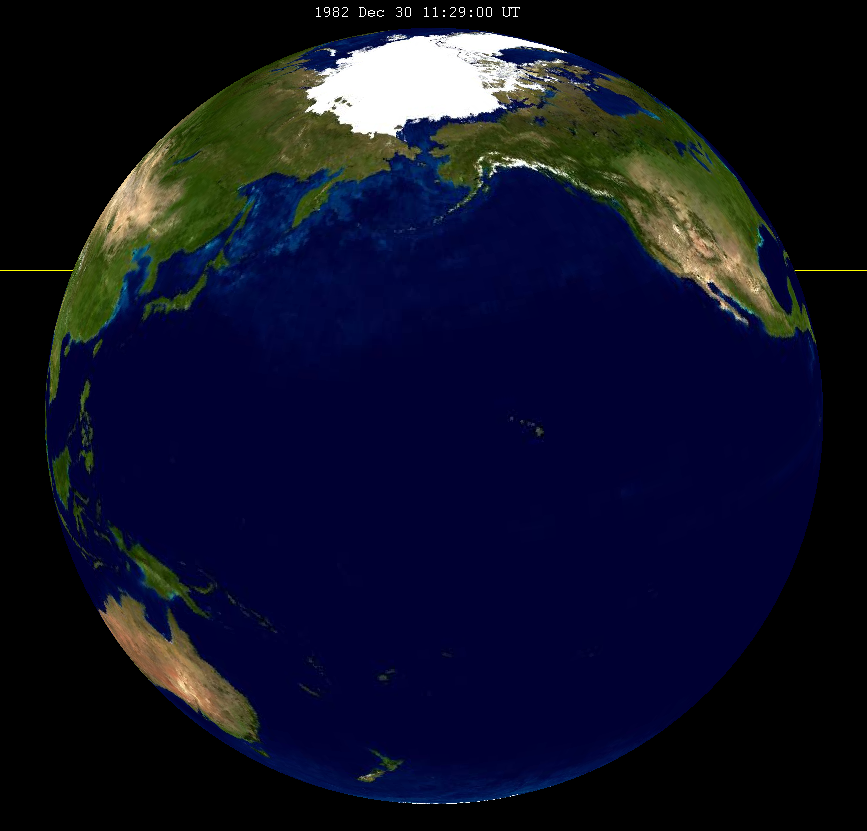
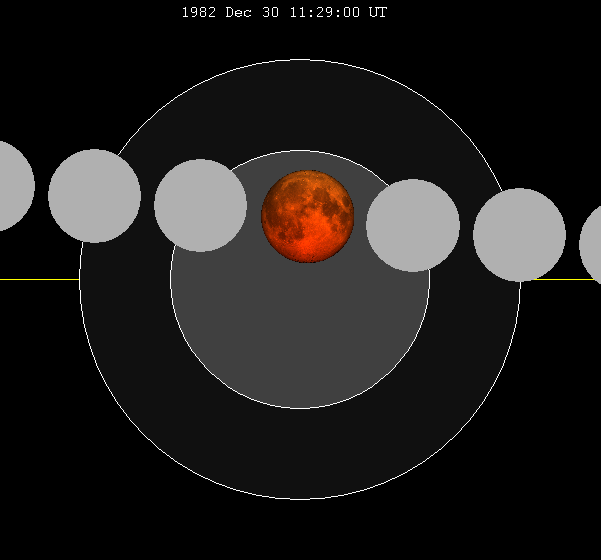

== Eclipse details ==
Shown below is a table displaying details about this particular solar eclipse. It describes various parameters pertaining to this eclipse.

December 30, 1982 Lunar Eclipse Parameters
Parameter	Value
Penumbral Magnitude	2.15450
Umbral Magnitude	1.18219
Gamma	0.37579
Sun Right Ascension	18h36m44.9s
Sun Declination	-23°10'20.5"
Sun Semi-Diameter	16'15.9"
Sun Equatorial Horizontal Parallax	08.9"
Moon Right Ascension	06h36m41.3s
Moon Declination	+23°33'23.8"
Moon Semi-Diameter	16'43.7"
Moon Equatorial Horizontal Parallax	1°01'23.7"
ΔT	53.0 s

== Eclipse season ==
This eclipse is part of an eclipse season, a period, roughly every six months, when eclipses occur. Only two (or occasionally three) eclipse seasons occur each year, and each season lasts about 35 days and repeats just short of six months (173 days) later; thus two full eclipse seasons always occur each year. Either two or three eclipses happen each eclipse season. In the sequence below, each eclipse is separated by a fortnight.

Eclipse season of December 1982
December 15 Descending node (new moon)	December 30 Ascending node (full moon)
Partial solar eclipse Solar Saros 122	Total lunar eclipse Lunar Saros 134

== Related eclipses ==
=== Eclipses in 1982 ===
- A total lunar eclipse on January 9.
- A partial solar eclipse on January 25.
- A partial solar eclipse on June 21.
- A total lunar eclipse on July 6.
- A partial solar eclipse on July 20.
- A partial solar eclipse on December 15.
- A total lunar eclipse on December 30.

=== Metonic ===
- Preceded by: Lunar eclipse of March 13, 1979
- Followed by: Lunar eclipse of October 17, 1986

=== Tzolkinex ===
- Preceded by: Lunar eclipse of November 18, 1975
- Followed by: Lunar eclipse of February 9, 1990

=== Half-Saros ===
- Preceded by: Solar eclipse of December 24, 1973
- Followed by: Solar eclipse of January 4, 1992

=== Tritos ===
- Preceded by: Lunar eclipse of January 30, 1972
- Followed by: Lunar eclipse of November 29, 1993

=== Lunar Saros 134 ===
- Preceded by: Lunar eclipse of December 19, 1964
- Followed by: Lunar eclipse of January 9, 2001

=== Inex ===
- Preceded by: Lunar eclipse of January 19, 1954
- Followed by: Lunar eclipse of December 10, 2011

=== Triad ===
- Preceded by: Lunar eclipse of February 28, 1896
- Followed by: Lunar eclipse of October 30, 2069

=== Lunar eclipses of 1980–1984 ===
This eclipse is a member of a semester series. An eclipse in a semester series of lunar eclipses repeats approximately every 177 days and 4 hours (a semester) at alternating nodes of the Moon's orbit.

The penumbral lunar eclipses on March 1, 1980 and August 26, 1980 occur in the previous lunar year eclipse set, and the penumbral lunar eclipses on May 15, 1984 and November 8, 1984 occur in the next lunar year eclipse set.

Lunar eclipse series sets from 1980 to 1984
Descending node				Ascending node			
Saros	Date Viewing	Type Chart	Gamma	Saros	Date Viewing	Type Chart	Gamma
109	1980 Jul 27	Penumbral	1.4139	114	1981 Jan 20	Penumbral	−1.0142
119	1981 Jul 17	Partial	0.7045	124	1982 Jan 09	Total	−0.2916
129	1982 Jul 06	Total	−0.0579	134	1982 Dec 30	Total	0.3758
139	1983 Jun 25	Partial	−0.8152	144	1983 Dec 20	Penumbral	1.0747
149	1984 Jun 13	Penumbral	−1.5240				

=== Saros 134 ===
This eclipse is a part of Saros series 134, repeating every 18 years, 11 days, and containing 72 events. The series started with a penumbral lunar eclipse on April 1, 1550. It contains partial eclipses from July 7, 1694 through October 13, 1856; total eclipses from October 25, 1874 through July 26, 2325; and a second set of partial eclipses from August 7, 2343 through November 12, 2505. The series ends at member 72 as a penumbral eclipse on May 28, 2830.

The longest duration of totality will be produced by member 38 at 100 minutes, 23 seconds on May 22, 2217. All eclipses in this series occur at the Moon’s ascending node of orbit.

Greatest	First			
The greatest eclipse of the series will occur on 2217 May 22, lasting 100 minutes, 23 seconds.	Penumbral	Partial	Total	Central
The greatest eclipse of the series will occur on 2217 May 22, lasting 100 minutes, 23 seconds.	1550 Apr 01	1694 Jul 07	1874 Oct 25	2127 Mar 28
The greatest eclipse of the series will occur on 2217 May 22, lasting 100 minutes, 23 seconds.	Last			
The greatest eclipse of the series will occur on 2217 May 22, lasting 100 minutes, 23 seconds.	Central	Total	Partial	Penumbral
The greatest eclipse of the series will occur on 2217 May 22, lasting 100 minutes, 23 seconds.	2289 Jul 04	2325 Jul 26	2505 Nov 12	2830 May 28

Eclipses are tabulated in three columns; every third eclipse in the same column is one exeligmos apart, so they all cast shadows over approximately the same parts of the Earth.

Series members 15–37 occur between 1801 and 2200:
15	16	17
1802 Sep 11	1820 Sep 22	1838 Oct 03
18	19	20
1856 Oct 13	1874 Oct 25	1892 Nov 04
21	22	23
1910 Nov 17	1928 Nov 27	1946 Dec 08
24	25	26
1964 Dec 19	1982 Dec 30	2001 Jan 09
27	28	29
2019 Jan 21	2037 Jan 31	2055 Feb 11
30	31	32
2073 Feb 22	2091 Mar 05	2109 Mar 17
33	34	35
2127 Mar 28	2145 Apr 07	2163 Apr 19
36	37	
2181 Apr 29	2199 May 10	

=== Tritos series ===
This eclipse is a part of a tritos cycle, repeating at alternating nodes every 135 synodic months (≈ 3986.63 days, or 11 years minus 1 month). Their appearance and longitude are irregular due to a lack of synchronization with the anomalistic month (period of perigee), but groupings of 3 tritos cycles (≈ 33 years minus 3 months) come close (≈ 434.044 anomalistic months), so eclipses are similar in these groupings.

Series members between 1801 and 2200
1808 May 10 (Saros 118)	1819 Apr 10 (Saros 119)	1830 Mar 09 (Saros 120)	1841 Feb 06 (Saros 121)	1852 Jan 07 (Saros 122)
1862 Dec 06 (Saros 123)	1873 Nov 04 (Saros 124)	1884 Oct 04 (Saros 125)	1895 Sep 04 (Saros 126)	1906 Aug 04 (Saros 127)
1917 Jul 04 (Saros 128)	1928 Jun 03 (Saros 129)	1939 May 03 (Saros 130)	1950 Apr 02 (Saros 131)	1961 Mar 02 (Saros 132)
1972 Jan 30 (Saros 133)	1982 Dec 30 (Saros 134)	1993 Nov 29 (Saros 135)	2004 Oct 28 (Saros 136)	2015 Sep 28 (Saros 137)
2026 Aug 28 (Saros 138)	2037 Jul 27 (Saros 139)	2048 Jun 26 (Saros 140)	2059 May 27 (Saros 141)	2070 Apr 25 (Saros 142)
2081 Mar 25 (Saros 143)	2092 Feb 23 (Saros 144)	2103 Jan 23 (Saros 145)	2113 Dec 22 (Saros 146)	2124 Nov 21 (Saros 147)
2135 Oct 22 (Saros 148)	2146 Sep 20 (Saros 149)	2157 Aug 20 (Saros 150)	2168 Jul 20 (Saros 151)	2179 Jun 19 (Saros 152)
2190 May 19 (Saros 153)

=== Inex series ===
This eclipse is a part of the long period inex cycle, repeating at alternating nodes, every 358 synodic months (≈ 10,571.95 days, or 29 years minus 20 days). Their appearance and longitude are irregular due to a lack of synchronization with the anomalistic month (period of perigee). However, groupings of 3 inex cycles (≈ 87 years minus 2 months) comes close (≈ 1,151.02 anomalistic months), so eclipses are similar in these groupings.

Series members between 1801 and 2200
1809 Apr 30 (Saros 128)	1838 Apr 10 (Saros 129)	1867 Mar 20 (Saros 130)
1896 Feb 28 (Saros 131)	1925 Feb 08 (Saros 132)	1954 Jan 19 (Saros 133)
1982 Dec 30 (Saros 134)	2011 Dec 10 (Saros 135)	2040 Nov 18 (Saros 136)
2069 Oct 30 (Saros 137)	2098 Oct 10 (Saros 138)	2127 Sep 20 (Saros 139)
2156 Aug 30 (Saros 140)	2185 Aug 11 (Saros 141)	

=== Half-Saros cycle ===
A lunar eclipse will be preceded and followed by solar eclipses by 9 years and 5.5 days (a half saros). This lunar eclipse is related to two annular solar eclipses of Solar Saros 141.

December 24, 1973	January 4, 1992

== See also ==
- List of lunar eclipses
- List of 20th-century lunar eclipses
