= Lunar Saros 134 =

Series of lunar eclipses

Member 26	Member 27
2001 Jan 09	2019 Jan 21

Saros cycle series 134 for lunar eclipses occurs at the moon's ascending node, 18 years 11 and 1/3 days. It contains 72 events.

This lunar saros is linked to Solar Saros 141.

== List ==
Cat.	Saros	Mem	Date	Time UT (hr:mn)	Type	Gamma	Magnitude	Duration (min)			Contacts UT (hr:mn)						Chart
Cat.	Saros	Mem	Date	Greatest	Type	Gamma	Magnitude	Pen.	Par.	Tot.	P1	P4	U1	U2	U3	U4	Chart
08546	134	1	1550 Apr 01	12:54:38	Penumbral	1.5506	-0.9770	12.9			12:48:11	13:01:05					
08590	134	2	1568 Apr 11	20:39:00	Penumbral	1.4970	-0.8760	85.4			19:56:18	21:21:42					
08633	134	3	1586 May 3	4:16:35	Penumbral	1.4373	-0.7639	121.9			3:15:38	5:17:32					
08676	134	4	1604 May 13	11:49:46	Penumbral	1.3732	-0.6441	150.2			10:34:40	13:04:52					
08721	134	5	1622 May 24	19:18:16	Penumbral	1.3046	-0.5161	174.3			17:51:07	20:45:25					
08765	134	6	1640 Jun 04	2:45:05	Penumbral	1.2340	-0.3848	194.8			1:07:41	4:22:29					
08809	134	7	1658 Jun 15	10:08:00	Penumbral	1.1593	-0.2463	213.1			8:21:27	11:54:33					
08854	134	8	1676 Jun 25	17:32:06	Penumbral	1.0849	-0.1086	228.9			15:37:39	19:26:33					
08900	134	9	1694 Jul 07	0:55:25	Partial	1.0089	0.0317	242.8	39.0		22:54:01	2:56:49	0:35:55			1:14:55	
08946	134	10	1712 Jul 18	8:21:48	Partial	0.9350	0.1678	254.7	87.9		6:14:27	10:29:09	7:37:51			9:05:45	
08993	134	11	1730 Jul 29	15:49:46	Partial	0.8619	0.3022	265.1	115.5		13:37:13	18:02:19	14:52:01			16:47:31	
09039	134	12	1748 Aug 08	23:23:28	Partial	0.7929	0.4287	273.8	134.9		21:06:34	1:40:22	22:16:01			0:30:55	
09086	134	13	1766 Aug 20	7:01:43	Partial	0.7272	0.5489	281.3	149.6		4:41:04	9:22:22	5:46:55			8:16:31	
09131	134	14	1784 Aug 30	14:45:57	Partial	0.6662	0.6602	287.4	161.1		12:22:15	17:09:39	13:25:24			16:06:30	
09176	134	15	1802 Sep 11	22:36:46	Partial	0.6105	0.7615	292.6	170.0		20:10:28	1:03:04	21:11:46			0:01:46	
09221	134	16	1820 Sep 22	6:35:09	Partial	0.5612	0.8511	296.7	176.8		4:06:48	9:03:30	5:06:45			8:03:33	
09267	134	17	1838 Oct 03	14:41:28	Partial	0.5182	0.9288	300.0	182.1		12:11:28	17:11:28	13:10:25			16:12:31	
09313	134	18	1856 Oct 13	22:54:33	Partial	0.4809	0.9960	302.7	186.2		20:23:12	1:25:54	21:21:27			0:27:39	
09357	134	19	1874 Oct 25	7:16:22	Total	0.4510	1.0497	304.8	189.2	32.7	4:43:58	9:48:46	5:41:46	7:00:01	7:32:43	8:50:58	
09401	134	20	1892 Nov 04	15:44:53	Total	0.4267	1.0930	306.5	191.5	44.1	13:11:38	18:18:08	14:09:08	15:22:50	16:06:56	17:20:38	
09444	134	21	1910 Nov 17	0:20:52	Total	0.4089	1.1246	307.7	193.0	50.6	21:47:01	2:54:43	22:44:22	23:55:34	0:46:10	1:57:22	
09486	134	22	1928 Nov 27	9:01:47	Total	0.3952	1.1486	308.7	194.2	54.8	6:27:26	11:36:08	7:24:41	8:34:23	9:29:11	10:38:53	
09528	134	23	1946 Dec 08	17:48:28	Total	0.3864	1.1639	309.5	194.9	57.3	15:13:43	20:23:13	16:11:01	17:19:49	18:17:07	19:25:55	
09569	134	24	1964 Dec 19	2:37:54	Total	0.3801	1.1748	310.1	195.5	58.9	0:02:51	5:12:57	1:00:09	2:08:27	3:07:21	4:15:39	
09610	134	25	1982 Dec 30	11:29:37	Total	0.3758	1.1822	310.6	195.9	60.0	8:54:19	14:04:55	9:51:40	10:59:37	11:59:37	13:07:34	
09651	134	26	2001 Jan 09	20:21:40	Total	0.3720	1.1889	311.0	196.3	61.0	17:46:10	22:57:10	18:43:31	19:51:10	20:52:10	21:59:49	
09692	134	27	2019 Jan 21	5:13:27	Total	0.3684	1.1953	311.5	196.8	62.0	2:37:42	7:49:12	3:35:03	4:42:27	5:44:27	6:51:51	
09733	134	28	2037 Jan 31	14:01:38	Total	0.3619	1.2074	312.1	197.5	63.7	11:25:35	16:37:41	12:22:53	13:29:47	14:33:29	15:40:23	
09773	134	29	2055 Feb 11	22:46:17	Total	0.3526	1.2246	312.9	198.4	66.0	20:09:50	1:22:44	21:07:05	22:13:17	23:19:17	0:25:29	
09814	134	30	2073 Feb 22	7:24:53	Total	0.3388	1.2503	313.8	199.7	69.2	4:47:59	10:01:47	5:45:02	6:50:17	7:59:29	9:04:44	
09855	134	31	2091 Mar 05	15:58:22	Total	0.3212	1.2832	315.0	201.3	72.9	13:20:52	18:35:52	14:17:43	15:21:55	16:34:49	17:39:01	
09898	134	32	2109 Mar 17	0:22:28	Total	0.2962	1.3296	316.4	203.3	77.5	21:44:16	3:00:40	22:40:49	23:43:43	1:01:13	2:04:07	
09940	134	33	2127 Mar 28	8:40:17	Total	0.2664	1.3849	318.0	205.5	82.3	6:01:17	11:19:17	6:57:32	7:59:08	9:21:26	10:23:02	
09983	134	34	2145 Apr 07	16:48:09	Total	0.2285	1.4550	319.7	207.9	87.3	14:08:18	19:28:00	15:04:12	16:04:30	17:31:48	18:32:06	
10027	134	35	2163 Apr 19	0:49:33	Total	0.1858	1.5338	321.5	210.2	91.8	22:08:48	3:30:18	23:04:27	0:03:39	1:35:27	2:34:39	
10070	134	36	2181 Apr 29	8:40:08	Total	0.1345	1.6281	323.2	212.3	95.9	5:58:32	11:21:44	6:53:59	7:52:11	9:28:05	10:26:17	
10113	134	37	2199 May 10	16:25:22	Total	0.0793	1.7297	324.8	214.0	98.8	13:42:58	19:07:46	14:38:22	15:35:58	17:14:46	18:12:22	
10157	134	38	2217 May 22	0:01:35	Total	0.0167	1.8444	326.0	215.2	100.4	21:18:35	2:44:35	22:13:59	23:11:23	0:51:47	1:49:11	
10201	134	39	2235 Jun 02	7:32:48	Total	-0.0495	1.7838	326.7	215.5	100.1	4:49:27	10:16:09	5:45:03	6:42:45	8:22:51	9:20:33	
10246	134	40	2253 Jun 12	14:57:11	Total	-0.1210	1.6520	326.9	214.8	97.6	12:13:44	17:40:38	13:09:47	14:08:23	15:45:59	16:44:35	
10292	134	41	2271 Jun 23	22:18:46	Total	-0.1943	1.5166	326.4	212.9	92.3	19:35:34	1:01:58	20:32:19	21:32:37	23:04:55	0:05:13	
10339	134	42	2289 Jul 04	5:36:25	Total	-0.2703	1.3760	325.1	209.6	83.3	2:53:52	8:18:58	3:51:37	4:54:46	6:18:04	7:21:13	
10386	134	43	2307 Jul 16	12:51:48	Total	-0.3475	1.2329	323.0	204.9	69.1	10:10:18	15:33:18	11:09:21	12:17:15	13:26:21	14:34:15	
10432	134	44	2325 Jul 26	20:06:28	Total	-0.4246	1.0898	320.2	198.6	45.0	17:26:22	22:46:34	18:27:10	19:43:58	20:28:58	21:45:46	
10478	134	45	2343 Aug 07	3:21:51	Partial	-0.5005	0.9484	316.5	190.7		0:43:36	6:00:06	1:46:30			4:57:12	
10523	134	46	2361 Aug 17	10:38:41	Partial	-0.5740	0.8112	312.1	181.2		8:02:38	13:14:44	9:08:05			12:09:17	
10568	134	47	2379 Aug 28	17:58:09	Partial	-0.6445	0.6792	307.1	170.1		15:24:36	20:31:42	16:33:06			19:23:12	
10612	134	48	2397 Sep 08	1:22:03	Partial	-0.7104	0.5556	301.7	157.4		22:51:12	3:52:54	0:03:21			2:40:45	
10657	134	49	2415 Sep 19	8:51:06	Partial	-0.7713	0.4410	296.1	143.2		6:23:03	11:19:09	7:39:30			10:02:42	
10701	134	50	2433 Sep 29	16:24:45	Partial	-0.8273	0.3352	290.4	127.2		13:59:33	18:49:57	15:21:09			17:28:21	
10745	134	51	2451 Oct 11	0:05:24	Partial	-0.8768	0.2413	284.9	109.8		21:42:57	2:27:51	23:10:30			1:00:18	
10787	134	52	2469 Oct 21	7:52:38	Partial	-0.9196	0.1596	279.8	90.6		5:32:44	10:12:32	7:07:20			8:37:56	
10829	134	53	2487 Nov 01	15:47:25	Partial	-0.9559	0.0900	275.3	68.9		13:29:46	18:05:04	15:12:58			16:21:52	
10870	134	54	2505 Nov 12	23:47:37	Partial	-0.9869	0.0301	271.4	40.3		21:31:55	2:03:19	23:27:28			0:07:46	
10911	134	55	2523 Nov 24	7:55:24	Penumbral	-1.0110	-0.0168	268.4			5:41:12	10:09:36					
10952	134	56	2541 Dec 04	16:08:21	Penumbral	-1.0300	-0.0543	266.2			13:55:15	18:21:27					
10994	134	57	2559 Dec 16	0:26:02	Penumbral	-1.0444	-0.0832	264.6			22:13:44	2:38:20					
11035	134	58	2577 Dec 26	8:46:27	Penumbral	-1.0560	-0.1065	263.5			6:34:42	10:58:12					
11075	134	59	2596 Jan 06	17:09:04	Penumbral	-1.0652	-0.1251	262.8			14:57:40	19:20:28					
11115	134	60	2614 Jan 18	1:31:45	Penumbral	-1.0735	-0.1418	262.1			23:20:42	3:42:48					
11154	134	61	2632 Jan 29	9:52:07	Penumbral	-1.0828	-0.1600	261.1			7:41:34	12:02:40					
11195	134	62	2650 Feb 08	18:09:59	Penumbral	-1.0934	-0.1803	259.7			16:00:08	20:19:50					
11237	134	63	2668 Feb 20	2:22:36	Penumbral	-1.1072	-0.2063	257.4			0:13:54	4:31:18					
11280	134	64	2686 Mar 02	10:28:53	Penumbral	-1.1257	-0.2405	253.9			8:21:56	12:35:50					
11322	134	65	2704 Mar 13	18:26:58	Penumbral	-1.1501	-0.2852	248.7			16:22:37	20:31:19					
11365	134	66	2722 Mar 25	2:17:14	Penumbral	-1.1798	-0.3398	241.7			0:16:23	4:18:05					
11407	134	67	2740 Apr 04	9:58:17	Penumbral	-1.2163	-0.4063	232.3			8:02:08	11:54:26					
11450	134	68	2758 Apr 15	17:28:58	Penumbral	-1.2602	-0.4867	219.8			15:39:04	19:18:52					
11494	134	69	2776 Apr 26	0:50:25	Penumbral	-1.3110	-0.5794	203.5			23:08:40	2:32:10					
11540	134	70	2794 May 7	8:02:01	Penumbral	-1.3690	-0.6856	181.9			6:31:04	9:32:58					
11586	134	71	2812 May 17	15:05:07	Penumbral	-1.4327	-0.8023	153.0			13:48:37	16:21:37					
11634	134	72	2830 May 28	21:58:39	Penumbral	-1.5032	-0.9315	110.1			21:03:36	22:53:42					

== See also ==
- List of lunar eclipses
  - List of Saros series for lunar eclipses
