= July 1982 lunar eclipse =

Total lunar eclipse 6 July 1982

- Total eclipse
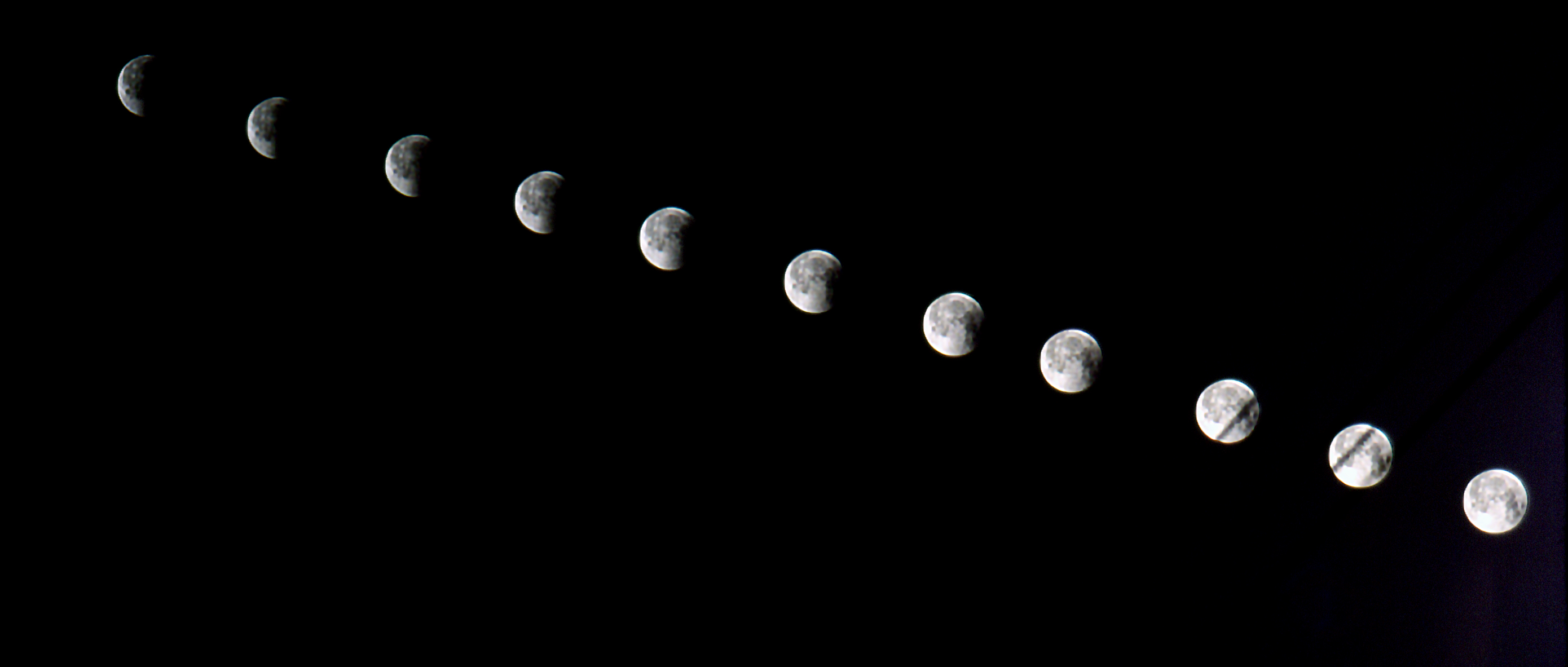
- From Carson, California
- Date: July 6, 1982
- Gamma: −0.0579
- Magnitude: 1.7180
- Saros cycle: 129 (36 of 71)
- Totality: 105 minutes, 44 seconds
- Partiality: 235 minutes, 35 seconds
- Penumbral: 373 minutes, 51 seconds
Contacts (UTC)
- P1: 4:23:58
- U1: 5:33:07
- U2: 6:38:03
- Greatest: 7:30:55
- U3: 8:23:47
- U4: 9:28:42
- P4: 10:37:49

A total lunar eclipse occurred at the Moon's descending node of orbit on Tuesday, July 6, 1982, with an umbral magnitude of 1.7180. It was a central lunar eclipse, in which part of the Moon passed through the center of the Earth's shadow. A lunar eclipse occurs when the Moon moves into the Earth's shadow, causing the Moon to be darkened. A total lunar eclipse occurs when the Moon's near side entirely passes into the Earth's umbral shadow. Unlike a solar eclipse, which can only be viewed from a relatively small area of the world, a lunar eclipse may be viewed from anywhere on the night side of Earth. A total lunar eclipse can last up to nearly two hours, while a total solar eclipse lasts only a few minutes at any given place, because the Moon's shadow is smaller. Occurring about 1.2 days after apogee (on July 5, 1982, at 2:30 UTC), the Moon's apparent diameter was smaller. It was the longest total lunar eclipse since the August 1859 eclipse.

== Visibility ==
The eclipse was completely visible over western and central North America, western South America, and Antarctica, seen rising over northwestern North America, Australia, and the western Pacific Ocean and setting over northeastern North America, eastern South America, and west and southern Africa.

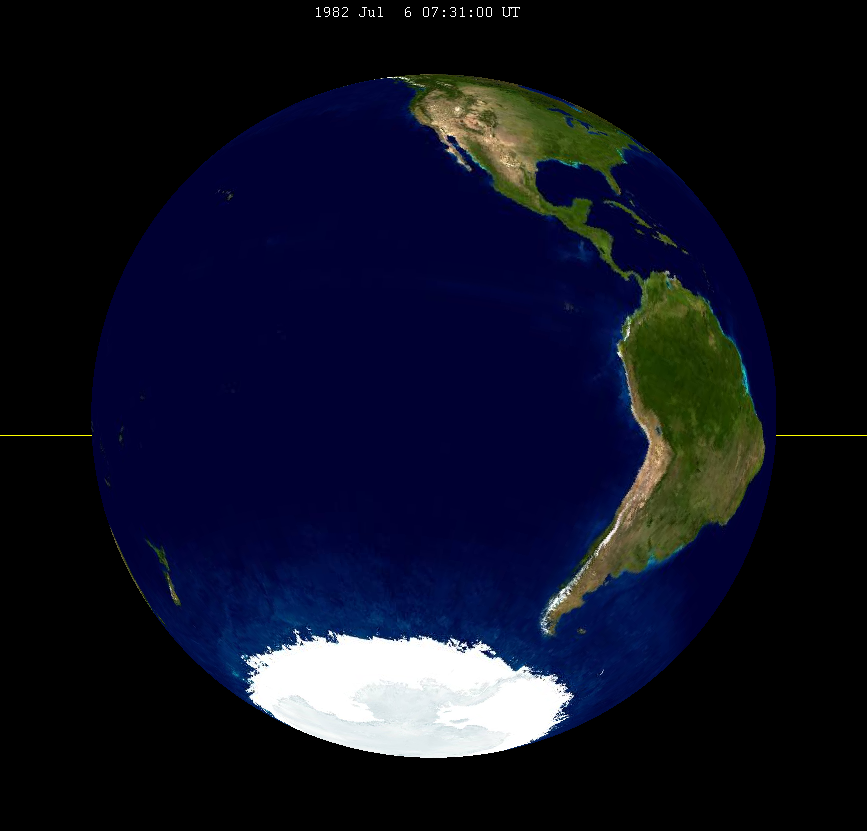
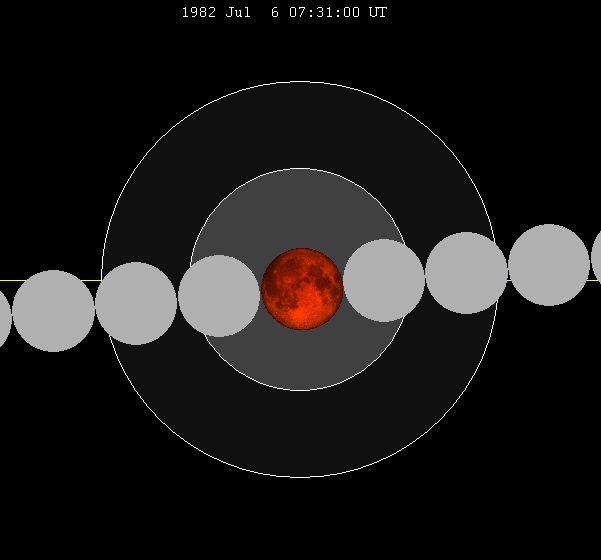

== Eclipse details ==
Shown below is a table displaying details about this particular lunar eclipse. It describes various parameters pertaining to this eclipse.

July 6, 1982 Lunar Eclipse Parameters
| Parameter | Value |
|---|---|
| Penumbral Magnitude | 2.78600 |
| Umbral Magnitude | 1.71795 |
| Gamma | −0.05792 |
| Sun Right Ascension | 07h00m26.1s |
| Sun Declination | +22°42'50.6" |
| Sun Semi-Diameter | 15'43.9" |
| Sun Equatorial Horizontal Parallax | 08.6" |
| Moon Right Ascension | 19h00m26.1s |
| Moon Declination | -22°45'58.4" |
| Moon Semi-Diameter | 14'43.7" |
| Moon Equatorial Horizontal Parallax | 0°54'03.4" |
| ΔT | 52.6 s |

== Eclipse season ==
This eclipse is part of an eclipse season, a period, roughly every six months, when eclipses occur. Only two (or occasionally three) eclipse seasons occur each year, and each season lasts about 35 days and repeats just short of six months (173 days) later; thus two full eclipse seasons always occur each year. Either two or three eclipses happen each eclipse season. In the sequence below, each eclipse is separated by a fortnight. The first and last eclipse in this sequence is separated by one synodic month.

Eclipse season of June–July 1982
| June 21 Ascending node (new moon) | July 6 Descending node (full moon) | July 20 Ascending node (new moon) |
|---|---|---|
| Partial solar eclipse Solar Saros 117 | Total lunar eclipse Lunar Saros 129 | Partial solar eclipse Solar Saros 155 |

== Related eclipses ==
=== Eclipses in 1982 ===
- A total lunar eclipse on January 9.
- A partial solar eclipse on January 25.
- A partial solar eclipse on June 21.
- A total lunar eclipse on July 6.
- A partial solar eclipse on July 20.
- A partial solar eclipse on December 15.
- A total lunar eclipse on December 30.

=== Metonic ===
- Preceded by: Lunar eclipse of September 16, 1978
- Followed by: Lunar eclipse of April 24, 1986

=== Tzolkinex ===
- Preceded by: Lunar eclipse of May 25, 1975
- Followed by: Lunar eclipse of August 17, 1989

=== Half-Saros ===
- Preceded by: Solar eclipse of June 30, 1973
- Followed by: Solar eclipse of July 11, 1991

=== Tritos ===
- Preceded by: Lunar eclipse of August 6, 1971
- Followed by: Lunar eclipse of June 4, 1993

=== Lunar Saros 129 ===
- Preceded by: Lunar eclipse of June 25, 1964
- Followed by: Lunar eclipse of July 16, 2000

=== Inex ===
- Preceded by: Lunar eclipse of July 26, 1953
- Followed by: Lunar eclipse of June 15, 2011

=== Triad ===
- Preceded by: Lunar eclipse of September 4, 1895
- Followed by: Lunar eclipse of May 6, 2069

=== Lunar eclipses of 1980–1984 ===
This eclipse is a member of a semester series. An eclipse in a semester series of lunar eclipses repeats approximately every 177 days and 4 hours (a semester) at alternating nodes of the Moon's orbit.

The penumbral lunar eclipses on March 1, 1980 and August 26, 1980 occur in the previous lunar year eclipse set, and the penumbral lunar eclipses on May 15, 1984 and November 8, 1984 occur in the next lunar year eclipse set.

Lunar eclipse series sets from 1980 to 1984
| Descending node | | | | Ascending node | | | |
| Saros | Date Viewing | Type Chart | Gamma | Saros | Date Viewing | Type Chart | Gamma |
| 109 | 1980 Jul 27 | Penumbral | 1.4139 | 114 | 1981 Jan 20 | Penumbral | −1.0142 |
| 119 | 1981 Jul 17 | Partial | 0.7045 | 124 | 1982 Jan 09 | Total | −0.2916 |
| 129 | 1982 Jul 06 | Total | −0.0579 | 134 | 1982 Dec 30 | Total | 0.3758 |
| 139 | 1983 Jun 25 | Partial | −0.8152 | 144 | 1983 Dec 20 | Penumbral | 1.0747 |
| 149 | 1984 Jun 13 | Penumbral | −1.5240 | | | | |

=== Saros 129 ===
This eclipse is a part of Saros series 129, repeating every 18 years, 11 days, and containing 71 events. The series started with a penumbral lunar eclipse on June 10, 1351. It contains partial eclipses from September 26, 1531 through May 11, 1892; total eclipses from May 24, 1910 through September 8, 2090; and a second set of partial eclipses from September 20, 2108 through April 26, 2469. The series ends at member 71 as a penumbral eclipse on July 24, 2613.

The longest duration of totality was produced by member 37 at 106 minutes, 24 seconds on July 16, 2000. All eclipses in this series occur at the Moon’s descending node of orbit.

| Greatest | First | | | |
|---|---|---|---|---|
| The greatest eclipse of the series occurred on 2000 Jul 16, lasting 106 minutes, 24 seconds. | Penumbral | Partial | Total | Central |
| The greatest eclipse of the series occurred on 2000 Jul 16, lasting 106 minutes, 24 seconds. | 1351 Jun 10 | 1531 Sep 26 | 1910 May 24 | 1946 Jun 14 |
| The greatest eclipse of the series occurred on 2000 Jul 16, lasting 106 minutes, 24 seconds. | Last | | | |
| The greatest eclipse of the series occurred on 2000 Jul 16, lasting 106 minutes, 24 seconds. | Central | Total | Partial | Penumbral |
| The greatest eclipse of the series occurred on 2000 Jul 16, lasting 106 minutes, 24 seconds. | 2036 Aug 07 | 2090 Sep 08 | 2469 Apr 26 | 2613 Jul 24 |

Eclipses are tabulated in three columns; every third eclipse in the same column is one exeligmos apart, so they all cast shadows over approximately the same parts of the Earth.

Series members 26–48 occur between 1801 and 2200:
| 26 | 27 | 28 |
|---|---|---|
| 1802 Mar 19 | 1820 Mar 29 | 1838 Apr 10 |
| 29 | 30 | 31 |
| 1856 Apr 20 | 1874 May 01 | 1892 May 11 |
| 32 | 33 | 34 |
| 1910 May 24 | 1928 Jun 03 | 1946 Jun 14 |
| 35 | 36 | 37 |
| 1964 Jun 25 | 1982 Jul 06 | 2000 Jul 16 |
| 38 | 39 | 40 |
| 2018 Jul 27 | 2036 Aug 07 | 2054 Aug 18 |
| 41 | 42 | 43 |
| 2072 Aug 28 | 2090 Sep 08 | 2108 Sep 20 |
| 44 | 45 | 46 |
| 2126 Oct 01 | 2144 Oct 11 | 2162 Oct 23 |
| 47 | 48 | |
| 2180 Nov 02 | 2198 Nov 13 | |

=== Tritos series ===
This eclipse is a part of a tritos cycle, repeating at alternating nodes every 135 synodic months (≈ 3986.63 days, or 11 years minus 1 month). Their appearance and longitude are irregular due to a lack of synchronization with the anomalistic month (period of perigee), but groupings of 3 tritos cycles (≈ 33 years minus 3 months) come close (≈ 434.044 anomalistic months), so eclipses are similar in these groupings.

Series members between 1801 and 2200
| 1807 Nov 15 (Saros 113) | 1818 Oct 14 (Saros 114) | 1829 Sep 13 (Saros 115) | 1840 Aug 13 (Saros 116) | 1851 Jul 13 (Saros 117) |
| 1862 Jun 12 (Saros 118) | 1873 May 12 (Saros 119) | 1884 Apr 10 (Saros 120) | 1895 Mar 11 (Saros 121) | 1906 Feb 09 (Saros 122) |
| 1917 Jan 08 (Saros 123) | 1927 Dec 08 (Saros 124) | 1938 Nov 07 (Saros 125) | 1949 Oct 07 (Saros 126) | 1960 Sep 05 (Saros 127) |
| 1971 Aug 06 (Saros 128) | 1982 Jul 06 (Saros 129) | 1993 Jun 04 (Saros 130) | 2004 May 04 (Saros 131) | 2015 Apr 04 (Saros 132) |
| 2026 Mar 03 (Saros 133) | 2037 Jan 31 (Saros 134) | 2048 Jan 01 (Saros 135) | 2058 Nov 30 (Saros 136) | 2069 Oct 30 (Saros 137) |
| 2080 Sep 29 (Saros 138) | 2091 Aug 29 (Saros 139) | 2102 Jul 30 (Saros 140) | 2113 Jun 29 (Saros 141) | 2124 May 28 (Saros 142) |
| 2135 Apr 28 (Saros 143) | 2146 Mar 28 (Saros 144) | 2157 Feb 24 (Saros 145) | 2168 Jan 24 (Saros 146) | 2178 Dec 24 (Saros 147) |
| 2189 Nov 22 (Saros 148) | 2200 Oct 23 (Saros 149) | | | |

=== Inex series ===
This eclipse is a part of the long period inex cycle, repeating at alternating nodes, every 358 synodic months (≈ 10,571.95 days, or 29 years minus 20 days). Their appearance and longitude are irregular due to a lack of synchronization with the anomalistic month (period of perigee). However, groupings of 3 inex cycles (≈ 87 years minus 2 months) comes close (≈ 1,151.02 anomalistic months), so eclipses are similar in these groupings.

Series members between 1801 and 2200
| 1808 Nov 03 (Saros 123) | 1837 Oct 13 (Saros 124) | 1866 Sep 24 (Saros 125) |
| 1895 Sep 04 (Saros 126) | 1924 Aug 14 (Saros 127) | 1953 Jul 26 (Saros 128) |
| 1982 Jul 06 (Saros 129) | 2011 Jun 15 (Saros 130) | 2040 May 26 (Saros 131) |
| 2069 May 06 (Saros 132) | 2098 Apr 15 (Saros 133) | 2127 Mar 28 (Saros 134) |
| 2156 Mar 07 (Saros 135) | 2185 Feb 14 (Saros 136) | |

=== Half-Saros cycle ===
A lunar eclipse will be preceded and followed by solar eclipses by 9 years and 5.5 days (a half saros). This lunar eclipse is related to two total solar eclipses of Solar Saros 136.

| June 30, 1973 | July 11, 1991 |

== See also ==
- List of lunar eclipses
- List of 20th-century lunar eclipses
