= Solar Saros 141 =

Series of solar eclipses

Historic saros cycle animation

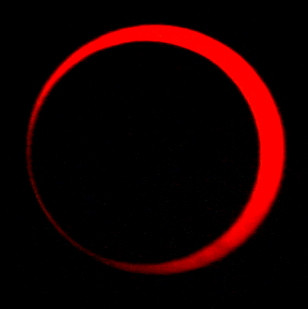
January 15, 2010 Annularity from Bangui, Central African Republic Series member 23

Saros cycle series 141 for solar eclipses occurs at the Moon's ascending node, repeats every 18 years, 11 days containing 70 eclipses, 41 of which are umbral (all annular). The first eclipse in this series was on 19 May 1613 and the last will be on 23 June 2857. The most recent eclipse was an annular eclipse on 15 January 2010 and the next will be an annular eclipse on 26 January 2028. This series contains only annular eclipses from 4 August 1739 through 14 October 2460, with no total or hybrid eclipses.

Longest annular solar eclipse: 14 December 1955 - 12 minutes, 9 seconds

Smallest annular solar eclipse: 24 December 1973 - magnitude: 0.9174

This solar saros is linked to Lunar Saros 134.

== Umbral eclipses ==
Umbral eclipses can be classified as either: 1) central (two limits), 2) central (one limit) or 3) non-central (one limit). The statistical distribution of these classes in Saros series 141 appears in the following table.

Classification	Number	Percent
All Umbral eclipses	41	100.00%
Central (two limits)	41	100.00%
Central (one limit)	0	0.00%
Non-central (one limit)	0	0.00%

== All eclipses ==
Saros	Member	Date	Time (Greatest) UTC	Type	Location Lat, Long	Gamma	Mag.	Width (km)	Duration (min:sec)	Ref
141	1	May 19, 1613	17:43:36	Partial	63.3N 137.6E	1.5171	0.0712			
141	2	May 31, 1631	0:25:38	Partial	64.1N 27.6E	1.4433	0.1996			
141	3	June 10, 1649	7:02:37	Partial	65N 81.5W	1.3657	0.3345			
141	4	June 21, 1667	13:36:07	Partial	65.9N 170.1E	1.2858	0.4732			
141	5	July 1, 1685	20:06:07	Partial	66.9N 62.2E	1.203	0.6163			
141	6	July 14, 1703	2:36:34	Partial	67.9N 46.3W	1.1206	0.758			
141	7	July 24, 1721	9:06:55	Partial	68.9N 155.2W	1.0382	0.899			
141	8	August 4, 1739	15:40:56	Annular	79.9N 42.9E	0.9588	0.9408	801	3m 59s	
141	9	August 14, 1757	22:16:45	Annular	71.6N 113.5W	0.8807	0.9407	467	4m 36s	
141	10	August 26, 1775	4:59:40	Annular	61.3N 132E	0.8088	0.9391	383	5m 16s	
141	11	September 5, 1793	11:47:24	Annular	51.7N 23E	0.7407	0.937	347	6m 2s	
141	12	September 17, 1811	18:43:45	Annular	43N 85.9W	0.6798	0.9345	330	6m 51s	
141	13	September 28, 1829	1:46:53	Annular	34.9N 164.3E	0.6243	0.9317	323	7m 43s	
141	14	October 9, 1847	9:00:23	Annular	27.7N 52.8E	0.5774	0.929	323	8m 35s	
141	15	October 19, 1865	16:21:14	Annular	21.3N 60.2W	0.5366	0.9263	326	9m 27s	
141	16	October 30, 1883	23:50:54	Annular	15.6N 174.9W	0.503	0.9238	331	10m 17s	
141	17	November 11, 1901	7:28:21	Annular	10.8N 68.9E	0.4758	0.9216	336	11m 1s	
141	18	November 22, 1919	15:14:12	Annular	6.9N 48.9W	0.4549	0.9198	341	11m 37s	
141	19	December 2, 1937	23:05:45	Annular	4N 167.8W	0.4389	0.9184	344	12m 0s	
141	20	December 14, 1955	7:02:25	Annular	2.1N 72.2E	0.4266	0.9176	346	12m 9s	
141	21	December 24, 1973	15:02:44	Annular	1.1N 48.5W	0.4171	0.9174	345	12m 2s	
141	22	January 4, 1992	23:05:37	Annular	1N 169.7W	0.4091	0.9179	340	11m 41s	
141	23	January 15, 2010	7:07:39	Annular	1.6N 69.3E	0.4002	0.919	333	11m 8s	
141	24	January 26, 2028	15:08:59	Annular	3N 51.5W	0.3901	0.9208	323	10m 27s	
141	25	February 5, 2046	23:06:26	Annular	4.8N 171.4W	0.3765	0.9232	310	9m 42s	
141	26	February 17, 2064	7:00:23	Annular	7N 69.7E	0.3597	0.9262	295	8m 56s	
141	27	February 27, 2082	14:47:00	Annular	9.4N 47.1W	0.3361	0.9298	277	8m 12s	
141	28	March 10, 2100	22:28:11	Annular	12N 162.4W	0.3077	0.9338	257	7m 29s	
141	29	March 22, 2118	6:00:55	Annular	14.3N 84.7E	0.2719	0.9382	237	6m 50s	
141	30	April 1, 2136	13:26:19	Annular	16.5N 26W	0.2295	0.943	216	6m 14s	
141	31	April 12, 2154	20:43:01	Annular	18.2N 134.2W	0.1794	0.9478	195	5m 42s	
141	32	April 23, 2172	3:53:15	Annular	19.2N 119.6E	0.1234	0.9528	174	5m 12s	
141	33	May 4, 2190	10:56:30	Annular	19.4N 15.4E	0.0608	0.9577	154	4m 45s	
141	34	May 15, 2208	17:53:06	Annular	18.7N 87W	-0.008	0.9625	136	4m 19s	
141	35	May 27, 2226	0:45:11	Annular	16.8N 171.5E	-0.081	0.967	119	3m 55s	
141	36	June 6, 2244	7:33:12	Annular	13.8N 70.7E	-0.1581	0.9712	105	3m 31s	
141	37	June 17, 2262	14:19:15	Annular	9.8N 30.2W	-0.2377	0.975	92	3m 8s	
141	38	June 27, 2280	21:03:21	Annular	4.6N 131.2W	-0.3197	0.9784	81	2m 45s	
141	39	July 9, 2298	3:49:02	Annular	1.4S 126.5E	-0.4012	0.9811	73	2m 23s	
141	40	July 20, 2316	10:36:18	Annular	8.1S 23.1E	-0.4819	0.9834	67	2m 3s	
141	41	July 31, 2334	17:26:33	Annular	15.6S 81.8W	-0.5608	0.9851	64	1m 45s	
141	42	August 11, 2352	0:21:35	Annular	23.6S 171.2E	-0.6366	0.9862	63	1m 32s	
141	43	August 22, 2370	7:22:21	Annular	32S 62E	-0.7082	0.9867	66	1m 22s	
141	44	September 1, 2388	14:30:25	Annular	40.7S 50.1W	-0.7744	0.9867	73	1m 15s	
141	45	September 12, 2406	21:45:23	Annular	49.6S 165.5W	-0.8356	0.9862	88	1m 11s	
141	46	September 23, 2424	5:09:46	Annular	58.6S 74.1E	-0.8896	0.9853	114	1m 8s	
141	47	October 4, 2442	12:43:00	Annular	67.2S 54.7W	-0.9371	0.9838	166	1m 8s	
141	48	October 14, 2460	20:25:57	Annular	73.9S 156.1E	-0.9775	0.9817	328	1m 9s	
141	49	October 26, 2478	4:18:22	Partial	71S 13.3W	-1.0109	0.9645			
141	50	November 5, 2496	12:20:23	Partial	70.2S 146.4W	-1.0373	0.9173			
141	51	November 17, 2514	20:31:22	Partial	69.3S 78.9E	-1.0572	0.8818			
141	52	November 28, 2532	4:49:26	Partial	68.3S 57W	-1.0722	0.8553			
141	53	December 9, 2550	13:15:41	Partial	67.2S 165.7E	-1.0815	0.839			
141	54	December 19, 2568	21:47:01	Partial	66.2S 27.6E	-1.0877	0.8284			
141	55	December 31, 2586	6:23:26	Partial	65.1S 111.3W	-1.0903	0.8243			
141	56	January 11, 2605	15:01:06	Partial	64.2S 110E	-1.0928	0.8207			
141	57	January 22, 2623	23:41:24	Partial	63.3S 29.1W	-1.0937	0.8199			
141	58	February 2, 2641	8:20:04	Partial	62.6S 167.5W	-1.0971	0.815			
141	59	February 13, 2659	16:57:15	Partial	62S 54.6E	-1.102	0.8073			
141	60	February 24, 2677	1:29:55	Partial	61.6S 81.9W	-1.1113	0.7915			
141	61	March 7, 2695	9:58:56	Partial	61.3S 142.5E	-1.1242	0.7693			
141	62	March 18, 2713	18:21:32	Partial	61.2S 8.6E	-1.1428	0.7362			
141	63	March 30, 2731	2:38:14	Partial	61.2S 123.8W	-1.1669	0.6925			
141	64	April 9, 2749	10:47:47	Partial	61.5S 105.6E	-1.1976	0.6362			
141	65	April 20, 2767	18:51:20	Partial	61.8S 23.6W	-1.2335	0.5694			
141	66	May 1, 2785	2:47:04	Partial	62.3S 151W	-1.2764	0.4886			
141	67	May 12, 2803	10:37:20	Partial	63S 82.7E	-1.3244	0.3976			
141	68	May 22, 2821	18:21:01	Partial	63.8S 42W	-1.3779	0.2949			
141	69	June 3, 2839	2:01:17	Partial	64.6S 166.2W	-1.435	0.1847			
141	70	June 13, 2857	9:35:05	Partial	65.5S 70.9E	-1.4973	0.0637			
