= March 1960 lunar eclipse =

Total lunar eclipse March 13, 1960

- Total eclipse
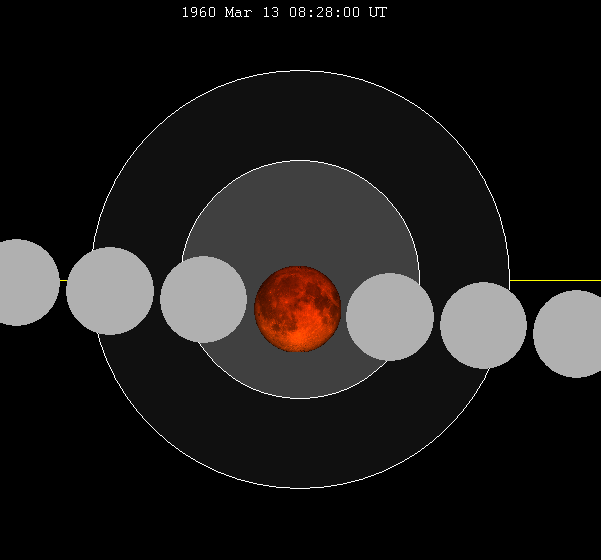
- The Moon's hourly motion shown right to left
- Date: March 13, 1960
- Gamma: −0.1799
- Magnitude: 1.5145
- Saros cycle: 122 (53 of 75)
- Totality: 93 minutes, 59 seconds
- Partiality: 219 minutes, 23 seconds
- Penumbral: 344 minutes, 47 seconds
Contacts (UTC)
- P1: 5:35:21
- U1: 6:38:08
- U2: 7:40:49
- Greatest: 8:27:48
- U3: 9:14:48
- U4: 10:17:30
- P4: 11:20:08

A total lunar eclipse occurred at the Moon’s ascending node of orbit on Sunday, March 13, 1960, with an umbral magnitude of 1.5145. It was a central lunar eclipse, in which part of the Moon passed through the center of the Earth's shadow. A lunar eclipse occurs when the Moon moves into the Earth's shadow, causing the Moon to be darkened. A total lunar eclipse occurs when the Moon's near side entirely passes into the Earth's umbral shadow. Unlike a solar eclipse, which can only be viewed from a relatively small area of the world, a lunar eclipse may be viewed from anywhere on the night side of Earth. A total lunar eclipse can last up to nearly two hours, while a total solar eclipse lasts only a few minutes at any given place, because the Moon's shadow is smaller. Occurring about 5.9 days before perigee (on March 19, 1960, at 7:10 UTC), the Moon's apparent diameter was larger.

This eclipse afforded astrophysicist Richard W. Shorthill the opportunity to make the first infrared pyrometric temperature scans of the lunar surface, and led to his discovery of the first lunar "hot spot" observed from Earth. Shorthill found that the temperature of the floor of the Tycho crater was 216° Kelvin (—57°C), significantly higher than the 160K (—113°C) in the area around the crater.

== Visibility ==
The eclipse was completely visible over North America and the central and eastern Pacific Ocean, seen rising over east and northeast Asia and Australia and setting over South America, western Europe, and west Africa.

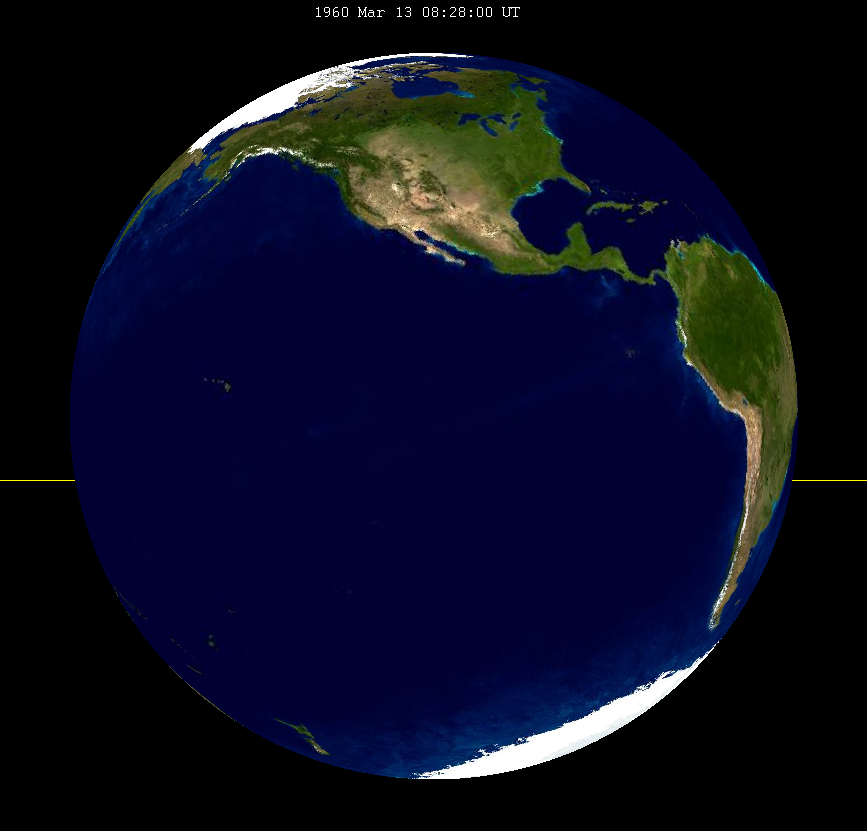
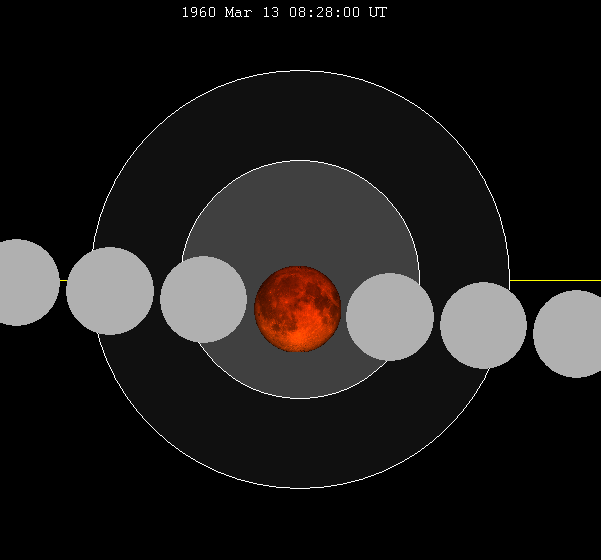

== Eclipse details ==
Shown below is a table displaying details about this particular lunar eclipse. It describes various parameters pertaining to this eclipse.

March 13, 1960 Lunar Eclipse Parameters
Parameter	Value
Penumbral Magnitude	2.54151
Umbral Magnitude	1.51449
Gamma	−0.17990
Sun Right Ascension	23h33m28.3s
Sun Declination	-02°52'01.0"
Sun Semi-Diameter	16'05.3"
Sun Equatorial Horizontal Parallax	08.8"
Moon Right Ascension	11h33m15.8s
Moon Declination	+02°42'09.5"
Moon Semi-Diameter	15'39.9"
Moon Equatorial Horizontal Parallax	0°57'29.4"
ΔT	33.3 s

== Eclipse season ==
This eclipse is part of an eclipse season, a period, roughly every six months, when eclipses occur. Only two (or occasionally three) eclipse seasons occur each year, and each season lasts about 35 days and repeats just short of six months (173 days) later; thus two full eclipse seasons always occur each year. Either two or three eclipses happen each eclipse season. In the sequence below, each eclipse is separated by a fortnight.

Eclipse season of March 1960
March 13 Ascending node (full moon)	March 27 Descending node (new moon)
Total lunar eclipse Lunar Saros 122	Partial solar eclipse Solar Saros 148

== Related eclipses ==
=== Eclipses in 1960 ===
- A total lunar eclipse on March 13.
- A partial solar eclipse on March 27.
- A total lunar eclipse on September 5.
- A partial solar eclipse on September 20.

=== Metonic ===
- Preceded by: Lunar eclipse of May 24, 1956
- Followed by: Lunar eclipse of December 30, 1963

=== Tzolkinex ===
- Preceded by: Lunar eclipse of January 29, 1953
- Followed by: Lunar eclipse of April 24, 1967

=== Half-Saros ===
- Preceded by: Solar eclipse of March 7, 1951
- Followed by: Solar eclipse of March 18, 1969

=== Tritos ===
- Preceded by: Lunar eclipse of April 13, 1949
- Followed by: Lunar eclipse of February 10, 1971

=== Lunar Saros 122 ===
- Preceded by: Lunar eclipse of March 3, 1942
- Followed by: Lunar eclipse of March 24, 1978

=== Inex ===
- Preceded by: Lunar eclipse of April 2, 1931
- Followed by: Lunar eclipse of February 20, 1989

=== Triad ===
- Preceded by: Lunar eclipse of May 12, 1873
- Followed by: Lunar eclipse of January 12, 2047

=== Lunar eclipses of 1958–1962 ===
This eclipse is a member of a semester series. An eclipse in a semester series of lunar eclipses repeats approximately every 177 days and 4 hours (a semester) at alternating nodes of the Moon's orbit.

The lunar eclipses on May 3, 1958 (partial) and October 28, 1958 (penumbral) occur in the previous lunar year eclipse set, and the penumbral lunar eclipse on July 17, 1962 occurs in the next lunar year eclipse set.

Lunar eclipse series sets from 1958 to 1962
Ascending node				Descending node			
Saros	Date Viewing	Type Chart	Gamma	Saros	Date Viewing	Type Chart	Gamma
102	1958 Apr 04	Penumbral	−1.5381				
112	1959 Mar 24	Partial	−0.8757	117	1959 Sep 17	Penumbral	1.0296
122	1960 Mar 13	Total	−0.1799	127	1960 Sep 05	Total	0.2422
132	1961 Mar 02	Partial	0.5541	137	1961 Aug 26	Partial	−0.4895
142	1962 Feb 19	Penumbral	1.2512	147	1962 Aug 15	Penumbral	−1.2210

=== Saros 122 ===
This eclipse is a part of Saros series 122, repeating every 18 years, 11 days, and containing 74 events. The series started with a penumbral lunar eclipse on August 14, 1022. It contains partial eclipses from April 10, 1419 through June 24, 1545; total eclipses from July 5, 1563 through May 6, 2050; and a second set of partial eclipses from May 17, 2068 through July 21, 2176. The series ends at member 74 as a penumbral eclipse on October 29, 2338.

The longest duration of totality was produced by member 39 at 100 minutes, 5 seconds on October 11, 1707. All eclipses in this series occur at the Moon’s ascending node of orbit.

Greatest	First			
The greatest eclipse of the series occurred on 1707 Oct 11, lasting 100 minutes, 5 seconds.	Penumbral	Partial	Total	Central
The greatest eclipse of the series occurred on 1707 Oct 11, lasting 100 minutes, 5 seconds.	1022 Aug 14	1419 Apr 10	1563 Jul 05	1617 Aug 16
The greatest eclipse of the series occurred on 1707 Oct 11, lasting 100 minutes, 5 seconds.	Last			
The greatest eclipse of the series occurred on 1707 Oct 11, lasting 100 minutes, 5 seconds.	Central	Total	Partial	Penumbral
The greatest eclipse of the series occurred on 1707 Oct 11, lasting 100 minutes, 5 seconds.	1996 Apr 04	2050 May 06	2176 Jul 21	2338 Oct 29

Eclipses are tabulated in three columns; every third eclipse in the same column is one exeligmos apart, so they all cast shadows over approximately the same parts of the Earth.

Series members 45–66 occur between 1801 and 2200:
45	46	47
1815 Dec 16	1833 Dec 26	1852 Jan 07
48	49	50
1870 Jan 17	1888 Jan 28	1906 Feb 09
51	52	53
1924 Feb 20	1942 Mar 03	1960 Mar 13
54	55	56
1978 Mar 24	1996 Apr 04	2014 Apr 15
57	58	59
2032 Apr 25	2050 May 06	2068 May 17
60	61	62
2086 May 28	2104 Jun 08	2122 Jun 20
63	64	65
2140 Jun 30	2158 Jul 11	2176 Jul 21
66
2194 Aug 02

=== Tritos series ===
This eclipse is a part of a tritos cycle, repeating at alternating nodes every 135 synodic months (≈ 3986.63 days, or 11 years minus 1 month). Their appearance and longitude are irregular due to a lack of synchronization with the anomalistic month (period of perigee), but groupings of 3 tritos cycles (≈ 33 years minus 3 months) come close (≈ 434.044 anomalistic months), so eclipses are similar in these groupings.

Series members between 1801 and 2200
1807 May 21 (Saros 108)	1818 Apr 21 (Saros 109)	1829 Mar 20 (Saros 110)	1840 Feb 17 (Saros 111)	1851 Jan 17 (Saros 112)
1861 Dec 17 (Saros 113)	1872 Nov 15 (Saros 114)	1883 Oct 16 (Saros 115)	1894 Sep 15 (Saros 116)	1905 Aug 15 (Saros 117)
1916 Jul 15 (Saros 118)	1927 Jun 15 (Saros 119)	1938 May 14 (Saros 120)	1949 Apr 13 (Saros 121)	1960 Mar 13 (Saros 122)
1971 Feb 10 (Saros 123)	1982 Jan 09 (Saros 124)	1992 Dec 09 (Saros 125)	2003 Nov 09 (Saros 126)	2014 Oct 08 (Saros 127)
2025 Sep 07 (Saros 128)	2036 Aug 07 (Saros 129)	2047 Jul 07 (Saros 130)	2058 Jun 06 (Saros 131)	2069 May 06 (Saros 132)
2080 Apr 04 (Saros 133)	2091 Mar 05 (Saros 134)	2102 Feb 03 (Saros 135)	2113 Jan 02 (Saros 136)	2123 Dec 03 (Saros 137)
2134 Nov 02 (Saros 138)	2145 Sep 30 (Saros 139)	2156 Aug 30 (Saros 140)	2167 Aug 01 (Saros 141)	2178 Jun 30 (Saros 142)
2189 May 29 (Saros 143)	2200 Apr 30 (Saros 144)			

=== Inex series ===
This eclipse is a part of the long period inex cycle, repeating at alternating nodes, every 358 synodic months (≈ 10,571.95 days, or 29 years minus 20 days). Their appearance and longitude are irregular due to a lack of synchronization with the anomalistic month (period of perigee). However, groupings of 3 inex cycles (≈ 87 years minus 2 months) comes close (≈ 1,151.02 anomalistic months), so eclipses are similar in these groupings.

Series members between 1801 and 2200
1815 Jun 21 (Saros 117)	1844 May 31 (Saros 118)	1873 May 12 (Saros 119)
1902 Apr 22 (Saros 120)	1931 Apr 02 (Saros 121)	1960 Mar 13 (Saros 122)
1989 Feb 20 (Saros 123)	2018 Jan 31 (Saros 124)	2047 Jan 12 (Saros 125)
2075 Dec 22 (Saros 126)	2104 Dec 02 (Saros 127)	2133 Nov 12 (Saros 128)
2162 Oct 23 (Saros 129)	2191 Oct 02 (Saros 130)	

=== Half-Saros cycle ===
A lunar eclipse will be preceded and followed by solar eclipses by 9 years and 5.5 days (a half saros). This lunar eclipse is related to two total solar eclipses of Solar Saros 129.

March 7, 1951	March 18, 1969

== See also ==
- List of lunar eclipses
- List of 20th-century lunar eclipses
