= March 1942 lunar eclipse =

Total lunar eclipse March 3, 1942

- Total eclipse
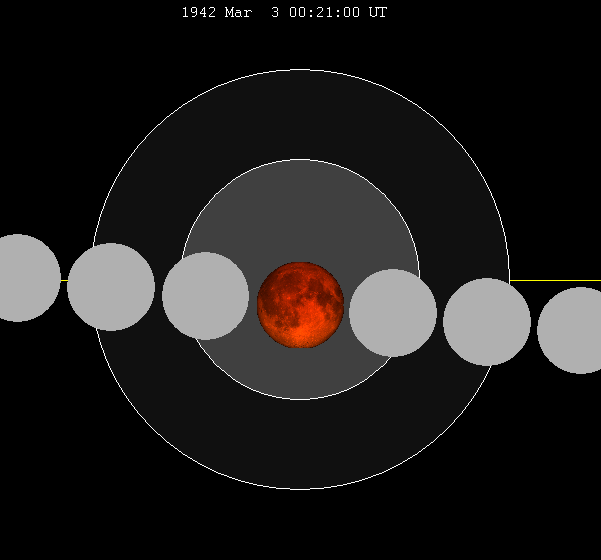
- The Moon's hourly motion shown right to left
- Date: March 3, 1942
- Gamma: −0.1545
- Magnitude: 1.5612
- Saros cycle: 122 (52 of 75)
- Totality: 95 minutes, 54 seconds
- Partiality: 219 minutes, 40 seconds
- Penumbral: 344 minutes, 18 seconds
Contacts (UTC)
- P1: 21:29:16
- U1: 22:31:40
- U2: 23:33:32
- Greatest: 0:21:28
- U3: 1:09:26
- U4: 2:11:19
- P4: 3:13:34

A total lunar eclipse occurred at the Moon's ascending node of orbit on Tuesday, March 3, 1942, with an umbral magnitude of 1.5612. It was a central lunar eclipse, in which part of the Moon passed through the center of the Earth's shadow. A lunar eclipse occurs when the Moon moves into the Earth's shadow, causing the Moon to be darkened. A total lunar eclipse occurs when the Moon's near side entirely passes into the Earth's umbral shadow. Unlike a solar eclipse, which can only be viewed from a relatively small area of the world, a lunar eclipse may be viewed from anywhere on the night side of Earth. A total lunar eclipse can last up to nearly two hours, while a total solar eclipse lasts only a few minutes at any given place, because the Moon's shadow is smaller. Occurring about 5.5 days before perigee (on March 8, 1942, at 11:50 UTC), the Moon's apparent diameter was larger.

== Visibility ==
The eclipse was completely visible over eastern South America, Africa, Europe, and the Middle East, seen rising over North America and west and central South America and setting over much of Asia and western Australia.

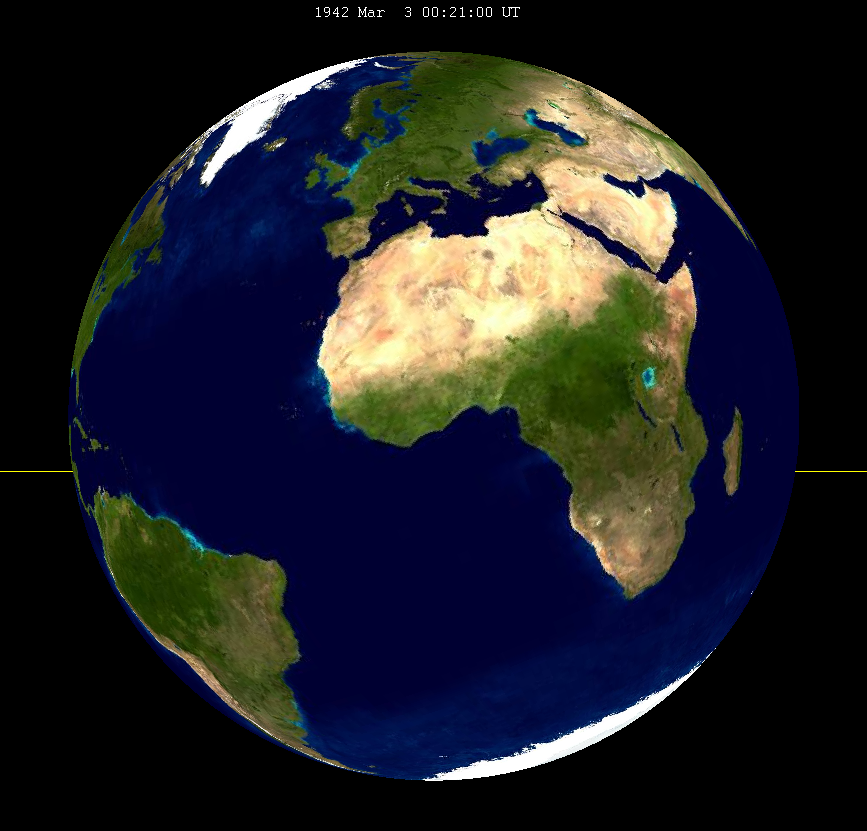
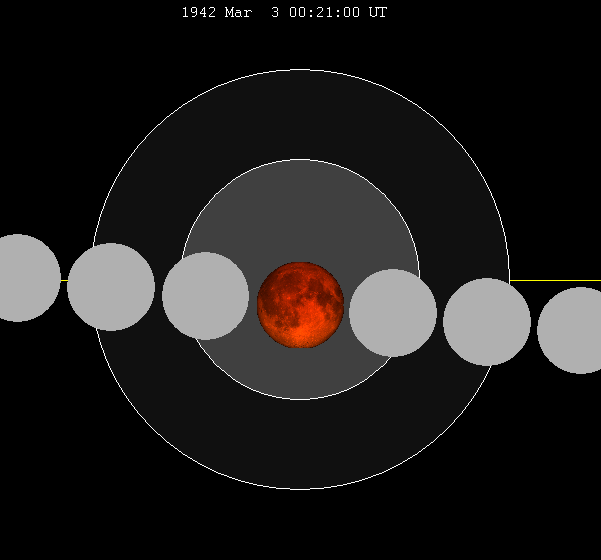

== Eclipse details ==
Shown below is a table displaying details about this particular lunar eclipse. It describes various parameters pertaining to this eclipse.

March 3, 1942 Lunar Eclipse Parameters
Parameter	Value
Penumbral Magnitude	2.58789
Umbral Magnitude	1.56118
Gamma	−0.15453
Sun Right Ascension	22h52m50.5s
Sun Declination	-07°08'24.4"
Sun Semi-Diameter	16'08.0"
Sun Equatorial Horizontal Parallax	08.9"
Moon Right Ascension	10h52m40.2s
Moon Declination	+06°59'52.2"
Moon Semi-Diameter	15'42.8"
Moon Equatorial Horizontal Parallax	0°57'40.1"
ΔT	25.4 s

== Eclipse season ==
This eclipse is part of an eclipse season, a period, roughly every six months, when eclipses occur. Only two (or occasionally three) eclipse seasons occur each year, and each season lasts about 35 days and repeats just short of six months (173 days) later; thus two full eclipse seasons always occur each year. Either two or three eclipses happen each eclipse season. In the sequence below, each eclipse is separated by a fortnight.

Eclipse season of March 1942
March 3 Ascending node (full moon)	March 16 Descending node (new moon)
Total lunar eclipse Lunar Saros 122	Partial solar eclipse Solar Saros 148

== Related eclipses ==
=== Eclipses in 1942 ===
- A total lunar eclipse on March 3.
- A partial solar eclipse on March 16.
- A partial solar eclipse on August 12.
- A total lunar eclipse on August 26.
- A partial solar eclipse on September 10.

=== Metonic ===
- Preceded by: Lunar eclipse of May 14, 1938
- Followed by: Lunar eclipse of December 19, 1945

=== Tzolkinex ===
- Preceded by: Lunar eclipse of January 19, 1935
- Followed by: Lunar eclipse of April 13, 1949

=== Half-Saros ===
- Preceded by: Solar eclipse of February 24, 1933
- Followed by: Solar eclipse of March 7, 1951

=== Tritos ===
- Preceded by: Lunar eclipse of April 2, 1931
- Followed by: Lunar eclipse of January 29, 1953

=== Lunar Saros 122 ===
- Preceded by: Lunar eclipse of February 20, 1924
- Followed by: Lunar eclipse of March 13, 1960

=== Inex ===
- Preceded by: Lunar eclipse of March 22, 1913
- Followed by: Lunar eclipse of February 10, 1971

=== Triad ===
- Preceded by: Lunar eclipse of May 2, 1855
- Followed by: Lunar eclipse of December 31, 2028

=== Lunar eclipses of 1940–1944 ===
This eclipse is a member of a semester series. An eclipse in a semester series of lunar eclipses repeats approximately every 177 days and 4 hours (a semester) at alternating nodes of the Moon's orbit.

The penumbral lunar eclipses on April 22, 1940 and October 16, 1940 occur in the previous lunar year eclipse set, and the penumbral lunar eclipses on July 6, 1944 and December 29, 1944 occur in the next lunar year eclipse set.

Lunar eclipse series sets from 1940 to 1944
Ascending node				Descending node			
Saros	Date Viewing	Type Chart	Gamma	Saros	Date Viewing	Type Chart	Gamma
102	1940 Mar 23	Penumbral	−1.5034	107			
112	1941 Mar 13	Partial	−0.8437	117	1941 Sep 05	Partial	0.9747
122	1942 Mar 03	Total	−0.1545	127	1942 Aug 26	Total	0.1818
132	1943 Feb 20	Partial	0.5752	137	1943 Aug 15	Partial	−0.5534
142	1944 Feb 09	Penumbral	1.2698	147	1944 Aug 04	Penumbral	−1.2843

=== Saros 122 ===
This eclipse is a part of Saros series 122, repeating every 18 years, 11 days, and containing 74 events. The series started with a penumbral lunar eclipse on August 14, 1022. It contains partial eclipses from April 10, 1419 through June 24, 1545; total eclipses from July 5, 1563 through May 6, 2050; and a second set of partial eclipses from May 17, 2068 through July 21, 2176. The series ends at member 74 as a penumbral eclipse on October 29, 2338.

The longest duration of totality was produced by member 39 at 100 minutes, 5 seconds on October 11, 1707. All eclipses in this series occur at the Moon’s ascending node of orbit.

Greatest	First			
The greatest eclipse of the series occurred on 1707 Oct 11, lasting 100 minutes, 5 seconds.	Penumbral	Partial	Total	Central
The greatest eclipse of the series occurred on 1707 Oct 11, lasting 100 minutes, 5 seconds.	1022 Aug 14	1419 Apr 10	1563 Jul 05	1617 Aug 16
The greatest eclipse of the series occurred on 1707 Oct 11, lasting 100 minutes, 5 seconds.	Last			
The greatest eclipse of the series occurred on 1707 Oct 11, lasting 100 minutes, 5 seconds.	Central	Total	Partial	Penumbral
The greatest eclipse of the series occurred on 1707 Oct 11, lasting 100 minutes, 5 seconds.	1996 Apr 04	2050 May 06	2176 Jul 21	2338 Oct 29

Eclipses are tabulated in three columns; every third eclipse in the same column is one exeligmos apart, so they all cast shadows over approximately the same parts of the Earth.

Series members 45–66 occur between 1801 and 2200:
45	46	47
1815 Dec 16	1833 Dec 26	1852 Jan 07
48	49	50
1870 Jan 17	1888 Jan 28	1906 Feb 09
51	52	53
1924 Feb 20	1942 Mar 03	1960 Mar 13
54	55	56
1978 Mar 24	1996 Apr 04	2014 Apr 15
57	58	59
2032 Apr 25	2050 May 06	2068 May 17
60	61	62
2086 May 28	2104 Jun 08	2122 Jun 20
63	64	65
2140 Jun 30	2158 Jul 11	2176 Jul 21
66
2194 Aug 02

=== Tritos series ===
This eclipse is a part of a tritos cycle, repeating at alternating nodes every 135 synodic months (≈ 3986.63 days, or 11 years minus 1 month). Their appearance and longitude are irregular due to a lack of synchronization with the anomalistic month (period of perigee), but groupings of 3 tritos cycles (≈ 33 years minus 3 months) come close (≈ 434.044 anomalistic months), so eclipses are similar in these groupings.

Series members between 1801 and 2200
1811 Mar 10 (Saros 110)	1822 Feb 06 (Saros 111)	1833 Jan 06 (Saros 112)	1843 Dec 07 (Saros 113)	1854 Nov 04 (Saros 114)
1865 Oct 04 (Saros 115)	1876 Sep 03 (Saros 116)	1887 Aug 03 (Saros 117)	1898 Jul 03 (Saros 118)	1909 Jun 04 (Saros 119)
1920 May 03 (Saros 120)	1931 Apr 02 (Saros 121)	1942 Mar 03 (Saros 122)	1953 Jan 29 (Saros 123)	1963 Dec 30 (Saros 124)
1974 Nov 29 (Saros 125)	1985 Oct 28 (Saros 126)	1996 Sep 27 (Saros 127)	2007 Aug 28 (Saros 128)	2018 Jul 27 (Saros 129)
2029 Jun 26 (Saros 130)	2040 May 26 (Saros 131)	2051 Apr 26 (Saros 132)	2062 Mar 25 (Saros 133)	2073 Feb 22 (Saros 134)
2084 Jan 22 (Saros 135)	2094 Dec 21 (Saros 136)	2105 Nov 21 (Saros 137)	2116 Oct 21 (Saros 138)	2127 Sep 20 (Saros 139)
2138 Aug 20 (Saros 140)	2149 Jul 20 (Saros 141)	2160 Jun 18 (Saros 142)	2171 May 19 (Saros 143)	2182 Apr 18 (Saros 144)
2193 Mar 17 (Saros 145)

=== Inex series ===
This eclipse is a part of the long period inex cycle, repeating at alternating nodes, every 358 synodic months (≈ 10,571.95 days, or 29 years minus 20 days). Their appearance and longitude are irregular due to a lack of synchronization with the anomalistic month (period of perigee). However, groupings of 3 inex cycles (≈ 87 years minus 2 months) comes close (≈ 1,151.02 anomalistic months), so eclipses are similar in these groupings.

Series members between 1801 and 2200
1826 May 21 (Saros 118)	1855 May 02 (Saros 119)	1884 Apr 10 (Saros 120)
1913 Mar 22 (Saros 121)	1942 Mar 03 (Saros 122)	1971 Feb 10 (Saros 123)
2000 Jan 21 (Saros 124)	2028 Dec 31 (Saros 125)	2057 Dec 11 (Saros 126)
2086 Nov 20 (Saros 127)	2115 Nov 02 (Saros 128)	2144 Oct 11 (Saros 129)
2173 Sep 21 (Saros 130)

=== Half-Saros cycle ===
A lunar eclipse will be preceded and followed by solar eclipses by 9 years and 5.5 days (a half saros). This lunar eclipse is related to two total solar eclipses of Solar Saros 129.

February 24, 1933	March 7, 1951

== See also ==
- List of lunar eclipses and List of 21st-century lunar eclipses
