= 1978 lunar eclipse =

Two total lunar eclipses occurred in 1978:

- 24 March 1978 lunar eclipse
- 16 September 1978 lunar eclipse

== See also ==
- List of 20th-century lunar eclipses
- Lists of lunar eclipses
