= 1967 lunar eclipse =

Two total lunar eclipses occurred in 1967:

- 24 April 1967 lunar eclipse
- 18 October 1967 lunar eclipse

== See also ==
- List of 20th-century lunar eclipses
- Lists of lunar eclipses
