= April 1996 lunar eclipse =

Total lunar eclipse April 4, 1996

- Total eclipse
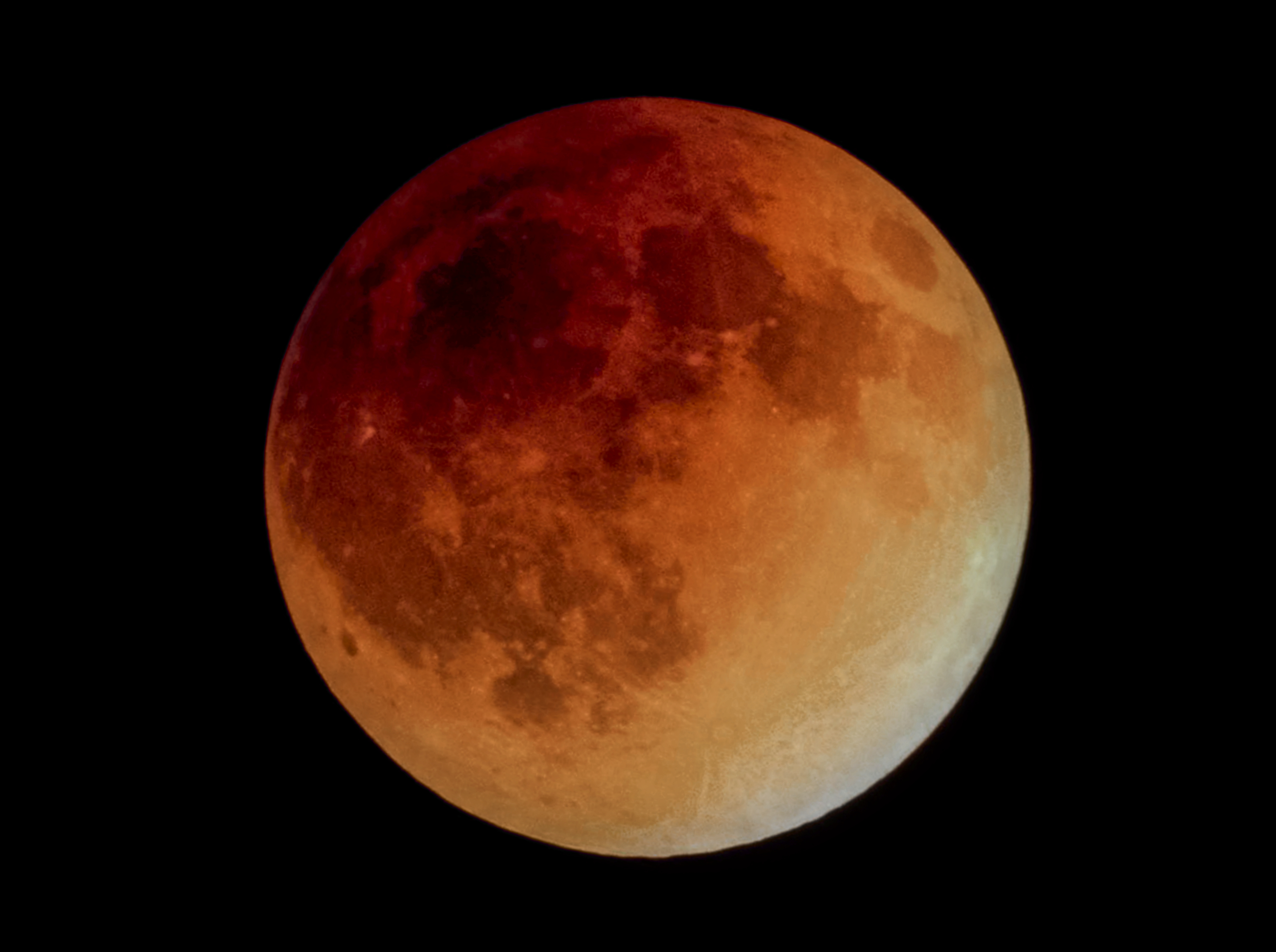
- Totality as viewed from Lecce, Italy
- Date: April 4, 1996
- Gamma: −0.2534
- Magnitude: 1.3795
- Saros cycle: 122 (55 of 75)
- Totality: 85 minutes, 45 seconds
- Partiality: 217 minutes, 8 seconds
- Penumbral: 344 minutes, 43 seconds
Contacts (UTC)
- P1: 21:17:22
- U1: 22:21:13
- U2: 23:26:54
- Greatest: 0:09:46
- U3: 0:52:39
- U4: 1:58:21
- P4: 3:02:04

A total lunar eclipse occurred at the Moon’s ascending node of orbit on Thursday, April 4, 1996, with an umbral magnitude of 1.3795. It was a central lunar eclipse, in which part of the Moon passed through the center of the Earth's shadow. A lunar eclipse occurs when the Moon moves into the Earth's shadow, causing the Moon to be darkened. A total lunar eclipse occurs when the Moon's near side entirely passes into the Earth's umbral shadow. Unlike a solar eclipse, which can only be viewed from a relatively small area of the world, a lunar eclipse may be viewed from anywhere on the night side of Earth. A total lunar eclipse can last up to nearly two hours, while a total solar eclipse lasts only a few minutes at any given place, because the Moon's shadow is smaller. The Moon's apparent diameter was near the average diameter because it occurred 6.9 days after apogee (on March 28, 1996, at 2:40 UTC) and 7.2 days before perigee (on April 11, 1996, at 3:45 UTC).

This lunar eclipse was the first of an almost tetrad, with the others being on September 27, 1996 (total); March 24, 1997 (partial); and September 16, 1997 (total).

This was the last central member and 55th overall member of Lunar Saros 122.

== Visibility ==
The eclipse was completely visible over eastern South America, Europe, and Africa, seen rising over much of North America and western and central South America and setting over much of Asia and western Australia.

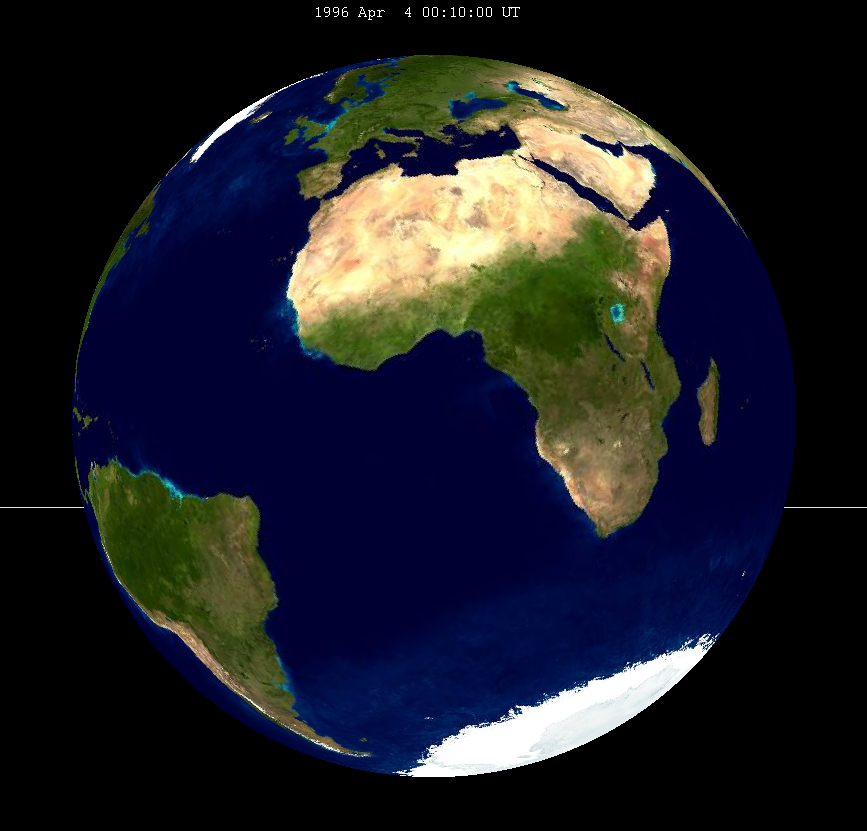
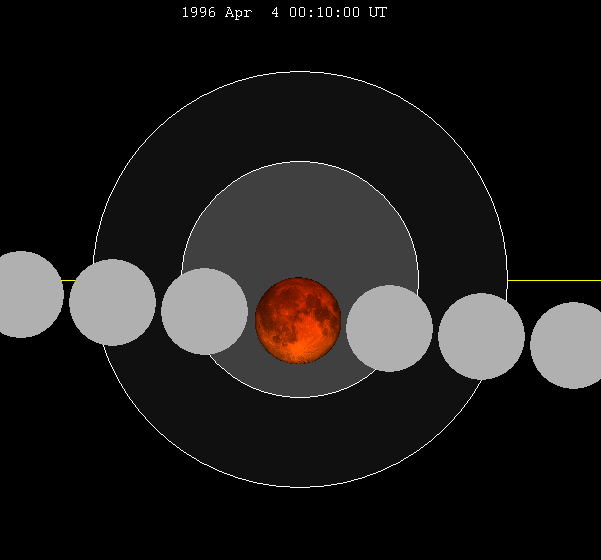

== Gallery ==
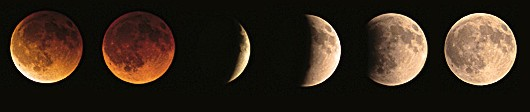
Hamois, Belgium

== Eclipse details ==
Shown below is a table displaying details about this particular lunar eclipse. It describes various parameters pertaining to this eclipse.

April 4, 1996 lunar eclipse parameters
Parameter	Value
Penumbral magnitude	2.40683
Umbral magnitude	1.37949
Gamma	−0.25339
Sun right ascension	00h53m26.5s
Sun declination	+05°43'14.0"
Sun semi-diameter	15'59.5"
Sun equatorial morizontal parallax	08.8"
Moon right ascension	12h53m09.4s
Moon declination	-05°57'04.2"
Moon semi-diameter	15'33.9"
Moon equatorial horizontal parallax	0°57'07.5"
ΔT	61.8 s

== Eclipse season ==
This eclipse is part of an eclipse season, a period, roughly every six months, when eclipses occur. Only two (or occasionally three) eclipse seasons occur each year, and each season lasts about 35 days and repeats just short of six months (173 days) later; thus two full eclipse seasons always occur each year. Either two or three eclipses happen each eclipse season. In the sequence below, each eclipse is separated by a fortnight.

Eclipse season of April 1996
April 4 Ascending node (full moon)	April 17 Descending node (new moon)
Total lunar eclipse Lunar Saros 122	Partial solar eclipse Solar Saros 148

== Related eclipses ==
=== Eclipses in 1996 ===
- A total lunar eclipse on April 4
- A partial solar eclipse on April 17
- A total lunar eclipse on September 27
- A partial solar eclipse on October 12

=== Metonic ===
- Preceded by: Lunar eclipse of June 15, 1992
- Followed by: Lunar eclipse of January 21, 2000

=== Tzolkinex ===
- Preceded by: Lunar eclipse of February 20, 1989
- Followed by: Lunar eclipse of May 16, 2003

=== Half-Saros ===
- Preceded by: Solar eclipse of March 29, 1987
- Followed by: Solar eclipse of April 8, 2005

=== Tritos ===
- Preceded by: Lunar eclipse of May 4, 1985
- Followed by: Lunar eclipse of March 3, 2007

=== Lunar Saros 122 ===
- Preceded by: Lunar eclipse of March 24, 1978
- Followed by: Lunar eclipse of April 15, 2014

=== Inex ===
- Preceded by: Lunar eclipse of April 24, 1967
- Followed by: Lunar eclipse of March 14, 2025

=== Triad ===
- Preceded by: Lunar eclipse of June 4, 1909
- Followed by: Lunar eclipse of February 2, 2083

=== Lunar eclipses of 1995–1998 ===
This eclipse is a member of a semester series. An eclipse in a semester series of lunar eclipses repeats approximately every 177 days and 4 hours (a semester) at alternating nodes of the Moon's orbit.

The penumbral lunar eclipse on August 8, 1998 occurs in the next lunar year eclipse set.

Lunar eclipse series sets from 1995 to 1998
Ascending node				Descending node			
Saros	Date Viewing	Type Chart	Gamma	Saros	Date Viewing	Type Chart	Gamma
112	1995 Apr 15	Partial	−0.9594	117	1995 Oct 08	Penumbral	1.1179
122	1996 Apr 04	Total	−0.2534	127	1996 Sep 27	Total	0.3426
132	1997 Mar 24	Partial	0.4899	137	1997 Sep 16	Total	−0.3768
142	1998 Mar 13	Penumbral	1.1964	147	1998 Sep 06	Penumbral	−1.1058

=== Saros 122 ===
This eclipse is a part of Saros series 122, repeating every 18 years, 11 days, and containing 74 events. The series started with a penumbral lunar eclipse on August 14, 1022. It contains partial eclipses from April 10, 1419 through June 24, 1545; total eclipses from July 5, 1563 through May 6, 2050; and a second set of partial eclipses from May 17, 2068 through July 21, 2176. The series ends at member 74 as a penumbral eclipse on October 29, 2338.

The longest duration of totality was produced by member 39 at 100 minutes, 5 seconds on October 11, 1707. All eclipses in this series occur at the Moon’s ascending node of orbit.

Greatest	First			
The greatest eclipse of the series occurred on 1707 Oct 11, lasting 100 minutes, 5 seconds.	Penumbral	Partial	Total	Central
The greatest eclipse of the series occurred on 1707 Oct 11, lasting 100 minutes, 5 seconds.	1022 Aug 14	1419 Apr 10	1563 Jul 05	1617 Aug 16
The greatest eclipse of the series occurred on 1707 Oct 11, lasting 100 minutes, 5 seconds.	Last			
The greatest eclipse of the series occurred on 1707 Oct 11, lasting 100 minutes, 5 seconds.	Central	Total	Partial	Penumbral
The greatest eclipse of the series occurred on 1707 Oct 11, lasting 100 minutes, 5 seconds.	1996 Apr 04	2050 May 06	2176 Jul 21	2338 Oct 29

Eclipses are tabulated in three columns; every third eclipse in the same column is one exeligmos apart, so they all cast shadows over approximately the same parts of the Earth.

Series members 45–66 occur between 1801 and 2200:
45	46	47
1815 Dec 16	1833 Dec 26	1852 Jan 07
48	49	50
1870 Jan 17	1888 Jan 28	1906 Feb 09
51	52	53
1924 Feb 20	1942 Mar 03	1960 Mar 13
54	55	56
1978 Mar 24	1996 Apr 04	2014 Apr 15
57	58	59
2032 Apr 25	2050 May 06	2068 May 17
60	61	62
2086 May 28	2104 Jun 08	2122 Jun 20
63	64	65
2140 Jun 30	2158 Jul 11	2176 Jul 21
66
2194 Aug 02

=== Tritos series ===
This eclipse is a part of a tritos cycle, repeating at alternating nodes every 135 synodic months (≈ 3986.63 days, or 11 years minus 1 month). Their appearance and longitude are irregular due to a lack of synchronization with the anomalistic month (period of perigee), but groupings of 3 tritos cycles (≈ 33 years minus 3 months) come close (≈ 434.044 anomalistic months), so eclipses are similar in these groupings.

Series members between 1801 and 2200
1810 Sep 13 (Saros 105)	1821 Aug 13 (Saros 106)	1832 Jul 12 (Saros 107)	1843 Jun 12 (Saros 108)	1854 May 12 (Saros 109)
1865 Apr 11 (Saros 110)	1876 Mar 10 (Saros 111)	1887 Feb 08 (Saros 112)	1898 Jan 08 (Saros 113)	1908 Dec 07 (Saros 114)
1919 Nov 07 (Saros 115)	1930 Oct 07 (Saros 116)	1941 Sep 05 (Saros 117)	1952 Aug 05 (Saros 118)	1963 Jul 06 (Saros 119)
1974 Jun 04 (Saros 120)	1985 May 04 (Saros 121)	1996 Apr 04 (Saros 122)	2007 Mar 03 (Saros 123)	2018 Jan 31 (Saros 124)
2028 Dec 31 (Saros 125)	2039 Nov 30 (Saros 126)	2050 Oct 30 (Saros 127)	2061 Sep 29 (Saros 128)	2072 Aug 28 (Saros 129)
2083 Jul 29 (Saros 130)	2094 Jun 28 (Saros 131)	2105 May 28 (Saros 132)	2116 Apr 27 (Saros 133)	2127 Mar 28 (Saros 134)
2138 Feb 24 (Saros 135)	2149 Jan 23 (Saros 136)	2159 Dec 24 (Saros 137)	2170 Nov 23 (Saros 138)	2181 Oct 22 (Saros 139)
2192 Sep 21 (Saros 140)

=== Inex series ===
This eclipse is a part of the long period inex cycle, repeating at alternating nodes, every 358 synodic months (≈ 10,571.95 days, or 29 years minus 20 days). Their appearance and longitude are irregular due to a lack of synchronization with the anomalistic month (period of perigee). However, groupings of 3 inex cycles (≈ 87 years minus 2 months) comes close (≈ 1,151.02 anomalistic months), so eclipses are similar in these groupings.

Series members between 1801 and 2200
1822 Aug 03 (Saros 116)	1851 Jul 13 (Saros 117)	1880 Jun 22 (Saros 118)
1909 Jun 04 (Saros 119)	1938 May 14 (Saros 120)	1967 Apr 24 (Saros 121)
1996 Apr 04 (Saros 122)	2025 Mar 14 (Saros 123)	2054 Feb 22 (Saros 124)
2083 Feb 02 (Saros 125)	2112 Jan 14 (Saros 126)	2140 Dec 23 (Saros 127)
2169 Dec 04 (Saros 128)	2198 Nov 13 (Saros 129)	

=== Half-Saros cycle ===
A lunar eclipse will be preceded and followed by solar eclipses by 9 years and 5.5 days (a half saros). This lunar eclipse is related to two hybrid solar eclipses of Solar Saros 129.

March 29, 1987	April 8, 2005

== See also ==
- List of lunar eclipses
- List of 20th-century lunar eclipses
