= April 2032 lunar eclipse =

Total

- Total eclipse
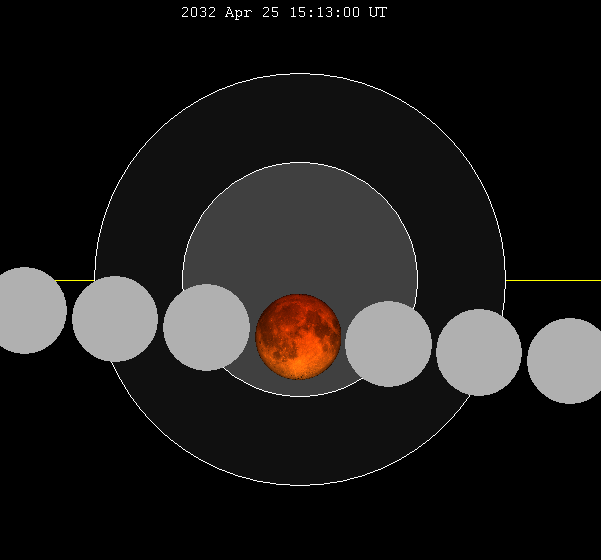
- The Moon's hourly motion shown right to left
- Date: April 25, 2032
- Gamma: −0.3558
- Magnitude: 1.1925
- Saros cycle: 122 (57 of 75)
- Totality: 65 minutes, 32 seconds
- Partiality: 211 minutes, 11 seconds
- Penumbral: 342 minutes, 26 seconds
Contacts (UTC)
- P1: 12:22:16
- U1: 13:27:58
- U2: 14:40:47
- Greatest: 15:14:51
- U3: 15:46:19
- U4: 16:59:09
- P4: 18:04:42

A total lunar eclipse will occur at the Moon’s ascending node of orbit on Sunday, April 25, 2032, with an umbral magnitude of 1.1925. A lunar eclipse occurs when the Moon moves into the Earth's shadow, causing the Moon to be darkened. A total lunar eclipse occurs when the Moon's near side entirely passes into the Earth's umbral shadow. Unlike a solar eclipse, which can only be viewed from a relatively small area of the world, a lunar eclipse may be viewed from anywhere on the night side of Earth. A total lunar eclipse can last up to nearly two hours, while a total solar eclipse lasts only a few minutes at any given place, because the Moon's shadow is smaller. The Moon's apparent diameter will be near the average diameter because it will occur 6.7 days after apogee (on April 18, 2032, at 23:00 UTC) and 8.1 days before perigee (on May 3, 2032, at 16:45 UTC).

This lunar eclipse is the first of a tetrad, with four total lunar eclipses in series, the others being on October 18, 2032, April 14, 2033, and October 8, 2033.

== Visibility ==
The eclipse will be completely visible over east Asia, Australia, and Antarctica, seen rising over east and central Africa, eastern Europe, and west and central Asia and setting over the eastern Pacific Ocean and western North America.

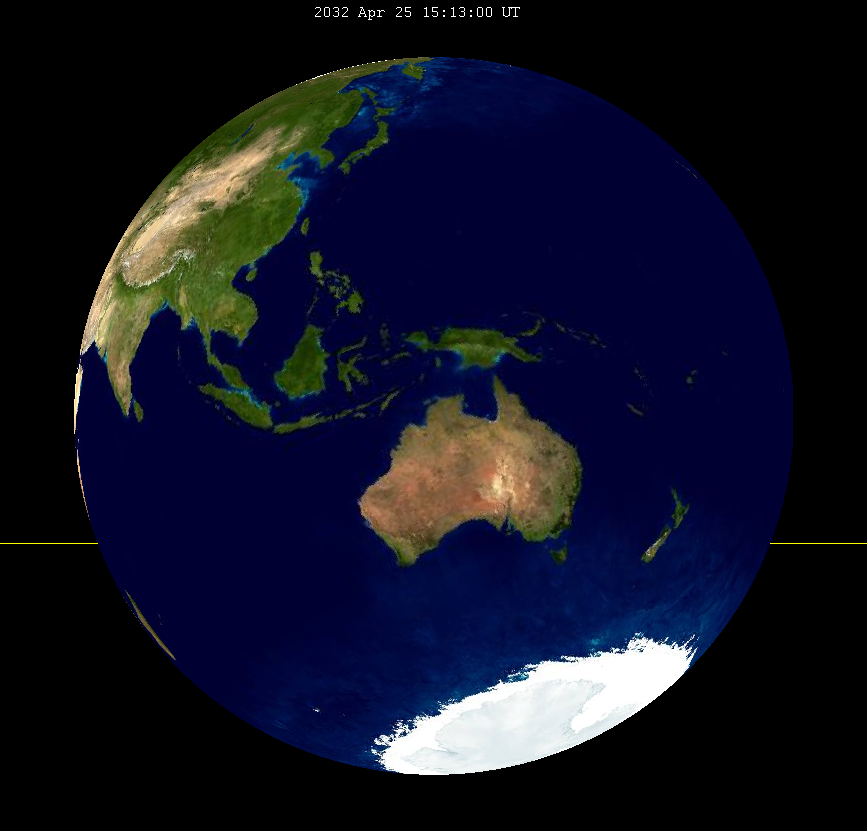
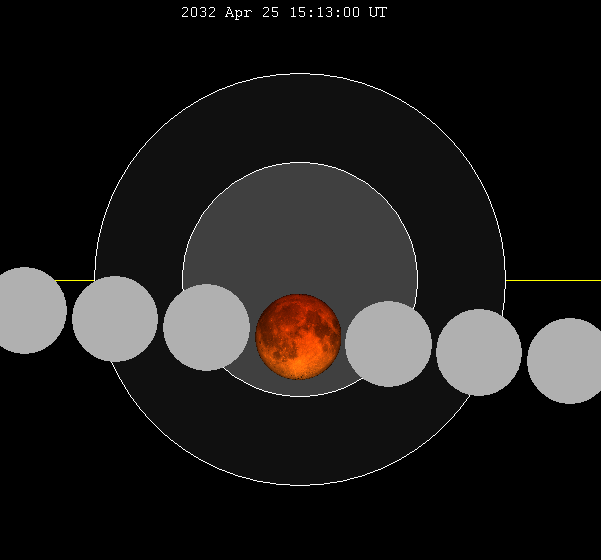

== Eclipse details ==
Shown below is a table displaying details about this particular solar eclipse. It describes various parameters pertaining to this eclipse.

April 25, 2032 Lunar Eclipse Parameters
Parameter	Value
Penumbral Magnitude	2.22037
Umbral Magnitude	1.19249
Gamma	−0.35578
Sun Right Ascension	02h14m38.2s
Sun Declination	+13°30'28.8"
Sun Semi-Diameter	15'53.8"
Sun Equatorial Horizontal Parallax	08.7"
Moon Right Ascension	14h14m18.6s
Moon Declination	-13°50'06.1"
Moon Semi-Diameter	15'27.9"
Moon Equatorial Horizontal Parallax	0°56'45.4"
ΔT	75.0 s

== Eclipse season ==
This eclipse is part of an eclipse season, a period, roughly every six months, when eclipses occur. Only two (or occasionally three) eclipse seasons occur each year, and each season lasts about 35 days and repeats just short of six months (173 days) later; thus two full eclipse seasons always occur each year. Either two or three eclipses happen each eclipse season. In the sequence below, each eclipse is separated by a fortnight.

Eclipse season of April–May 2032
April 25 Ascending node (full moon)	May 9 Descending node (new moon)
Total lunar eclipse Lunar Saros 122	Annular solar eclipse Solar Saros 148

== Related eclipses ==
=== Eclipses in 2032 ===
- A total lunar eclipse on April 25
- An annular solar eclipse on May 9
- A total lunar eclipse on October 18
- A partial solar eclipse on November 3

=== Metonic ===
- Preceded by: Lunar eclipse of July 6, 2028
- Followed by: Lunar eclipse of February 11, 2036

=== Tzolkinex ===
- Preceded by: Lunar eclipse of March 14, 2025
- Followed by: Lunar eclipse of June 6, 2039

=== Half-Saros ===
- Preceded by: Solar eclipse of April 20, 2023
- Followed by: Solar eclipse of April 30, 2041

=== Tritos ===
- Preceded by: Lunar eclipse of May 26, 2021
- Followed by: Lunar eclipse of March 25, 2043

=== Lunar Saros 122 ===
- Preceded by: Lunar eclipse of April 15, 2014
- Followed by: Lunar eclipse of May 6, 2050

=== Inex ===
- Preceded by: Lunar eclipse of May 16, 2003
- Followed by: Lunar eclipse of April 4, 2061

=== Triad ===
- Preceded by: Lunar eclipse of June 25, 1945
- Followed by: Lunar eclipse of February 25, 2119

=== Lunar eclipses of 2031–2034 ===
This eclipse is a member of a semester series. An eclipse in a semester series of lunar eclipses repeats approximately every 177 days and 4 hours (a semester) at alternating nodes of the Moon's orbit.

The penumbral lunar eclipse on June 5, 2031 occurs in the previous lunar year eclipse set.

Lunar eclipse series sets from 2031 to 2034
Ascending node				Descending node			
Saros	Date Viewing	Type Chart	Gamma	Saros	Date Viewing	Type Chart	Gamma
112	2031 May 07	Penumbral	−1.0694	117	2031 Oct 30	Penumbral	1.1774
122	2032 Apr 25	Total	−0.3558	127	2032 Oct 18	Total	0.4169
132	2033 Apr 14	Total	0.3954	137	2033 Oct 08	Total	−0.2889
142	2034 Apr 03	Penumbral	1.1144	147	2034 Sep 28	Partial	−1.0110

=== Saros 122 ===
This eclipse is a part of Saros series 122, repeating every 18 years, 11 days, and containing 74 events. The series started with a penumbral lunar eclipse on August 14, 1022. It contains partial eclipses from April 10, 1419 through June 24, 1545; total eclipses from July 5, 1563 through May 6, 2050; and a second set of partial eclipses from May 17, 2068 through July 21, 2176. The series ends at member 74 as a penumbral eclipse on October 29, 2338.

The longest duration of totality was produced by member 39 at 100 minutes, 5 seconds on October 11, 1707. All eclipses in this series occur at the Moon’s ascending node of orbit.

Greatest	First			
The greatest eclipse of the series occurred on 1707 Oct 11, lasting 100 minutes, 5 seconds.	Penumbral	Partial	Total	Central
The greatest eclipse of the series occurred on 1707 Oct 11, lasting 100 minutes, 5 seconds.	1022 Aug 14	1419 Apr 10	1563 Jul 05	1617 Aug 16
The greatest eclipse of the series occurred on 1707 Oct 11, lasting 100 minutes, 5 seconds.	Last			
The greatest eclipse of the series occurred on 1707 Oct 11, lasting 100 minutes, 5 seconds.	Central	Total	Partial	Penumbral
The greatest eclipse of the series occurred on 1707 Oct 11, lasting 100 minutes, 5 seconds.	1996 Apr 04	2050 May 06	2176 Jul 21	2338 Oct 29

Eclipses are tabulated in three columns; every third eclipse in the same column is one exeligmos apart, so they all cast shadows over approximately the same parts of the Earth.

Series members 45–66 occur between 1801 and 2200:
45	46	47
1815 Dec 16	1833 Dec 26	1852 Jan 07
48	49	50
1870 Jan 17	1888 Jan 28	1906 Feb 09
51	52	53
1924 Feb 20	1942 Mar 03	1960 Mar 13
54	55	56
1978 Mar 24	1996 Apr 04	2014 Apr 15
57	58	59
2032 Apr 25	2050 May 06	2068 May 17
60	61	62
2086 May 28	2104 Jun 08	2122 Jun 20
63	64	65
2140 Jun 30	2158 Jul 11	2176 Jul 21
66
2194 Aug 02

=== Tritos series ===
This eclipse is a part of a tritos cycle, repeating at alternating nodes every 135 synodic months (≈ 3986.63 days, or 11 years minus 1 month). Their appearance and longitude are irregular due to a lack of synchronization with the anomalistic month (period of perigee), but groupings of 3 tritos cycles (≈ 33 years minus 3 months) come close (≈ 434.044 anomalistic months), so eclipses are similar in these groupings.

Series members between 1801 and 2200
1803 Feb 06 (Saros 101)	1814 Jan 06 (Saros 102)	1824 Dec 06 (Saros 103)		1846 Oct 04 (Saros 105)
1857 Sep 04 (Saros 106)	1868 Aug 03 (Saros 107)	1879 Jul 03 (Saros 108)	1890 Jun 03 (Saros 109)	1901 May 03 (Saros 110)
1912 Apr 01 (Saros 111)	1923 Mar 03 (Saros 112)	1934 Jan 30 (Saros 113)	1944 Dec 29 (Saros 114)	1955 Nov 29 (Saros 115)
1966 Oct 29 (Saros 116)	1977 Sep 27 (Saros 117)	1988 Aug 27 (Saros 118)	1999 Jul 28 (Saros 119)	2010 Jun 26 (Saros 120)
2021 May 26 (Saros 121)	2032 Apr 25 (Saros 122)	2043 Mar 25 (Saros 123)	2054 Feb 22 (Saros 124)	2065 Jan 22 (Saros 125)
2075 Dec 22 (Saros 126)	2086 Nov 20 (Saros 127)	2097 Oct 21 (Saros 128)	2108 Sep 20 (Saros 129)	2119 Aug 20 (Saros 130)
2130 Jul 21 (Saros 131)	2141 Jun 19 (Saros 132)	2152 May 18 (Saros 133)	2163 Apr 19 (Saros 134)	2174 Mar 18 (Saros 135)
2185 Feb 14 (Saros 136)	2196 Jan 15 (Saros 137)			

=== Inex series ===
This eclipse is a part of the long period inex cycle, repeating at alternating nodes, every 358 synodic months (≈ 10,571.95 days, or 29 years minus 20 days). Their appearance and longitude are irregular due to a lack of synchronization with the anomalistic month (period of perigee). However, groupings of 3 inex cycles (≈ 87 years minus 2 months) comes close (≈ 1,151.02 anomalistic months), so eclipses are similar in these groupings.

Series members between 1801 and 2200
1829 Sep 13 (Saros 115)	1858 Aug 24 (Saros 116)	1887 Aug 03 (Saros 117)
1916 Jul 15 (Saros 118)	1945 Jun 25 (Saros 119)	1974 Jun 04 (Saros 120)
2003 May 16 (Saros 121)	2032 Apr 25 (Saros 122)	2061 Apr 04 (Saros 123)
2090 Mar 15 (Saros 124)	2119 Feb 25 (Saros 125)	2148 Feb 04 (Saros 126)
2177 Jan 14 (Saros 127)

=== Half-Saros cycle ===
A lunar eclipse will be preceded and followed by solar eclipses by 9 years and 5.5 days (a half saros). This lunar eclipse is related to two partial solar eclipses of Solar Saros 129.

April 20, 2023	April 30, 2041

== See also ==
- List of lunar eclipses and List of 21st-century lunar eclipses
