= May 2050 lunar eclipse =

Astronomical event

- Total eclipse
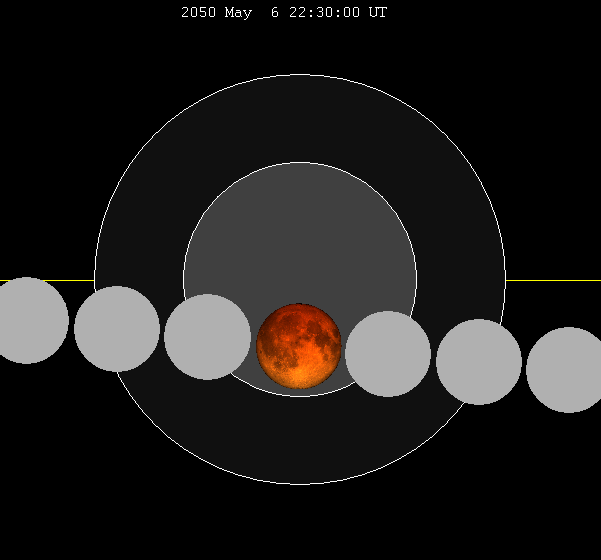
- The Moon's hourly motion shown right to left
- Date: May 6, 2050
- Gamma: −0.4181
- Magnitude: 1.0779
- Saros cycle: 122 (58 of 75)
- Totality: 43 minutes, 11 seconds
- Partiality: 205 minutes, 59 seconds
- Penumbral: 340 minutes, 1 second
Contacts (UTC)
- P1: 19:40:25
- U1: 20:47:31
- U2: 22:08:54
- Greatest: 22:30:28
- U3: 22:52:05
- U4: 0:13:30
- P4: 1:20:27

A total lunar eclipse will occur at the Moon’s ascending node of orbit on Friday, May 6, 2050, with an umbral magnitude of 1.0779. A lunar eclipse occurs when the Moon moves into the Earth's shadow, causing the Moon to be darkened. A total lunar eclipse occurs when the Moon's near side entirely passes into the Earth's umbral shadow. Unlike a solar eclipse, which can only be viewed from a relatively small area of the world, a lunar eclipse may be viewed from anywhere on the night side of Earth. A total lunar eclipse can last up to nearly two hours, while a total solar eclipse lasts only a few minutes at any given place, because the Moon's shadow is smaller. Occurring about 6.5 days after apogee (on April 30, 2050, at 11:10 UTC), the Moon's apparent diameter will be smaller.

This lunar eclipse is the first of a tetrad, with four total lunar eclipses in series, the others being on October 30, 2050; April 26, 2051; and October 19, 2051.

== Visibility ==
The eclipse will be completely visible over Africa, Europe, the Middle East, and Antarctica, seen rising over eastern North America and South America and setting over much of Asia and Australia.

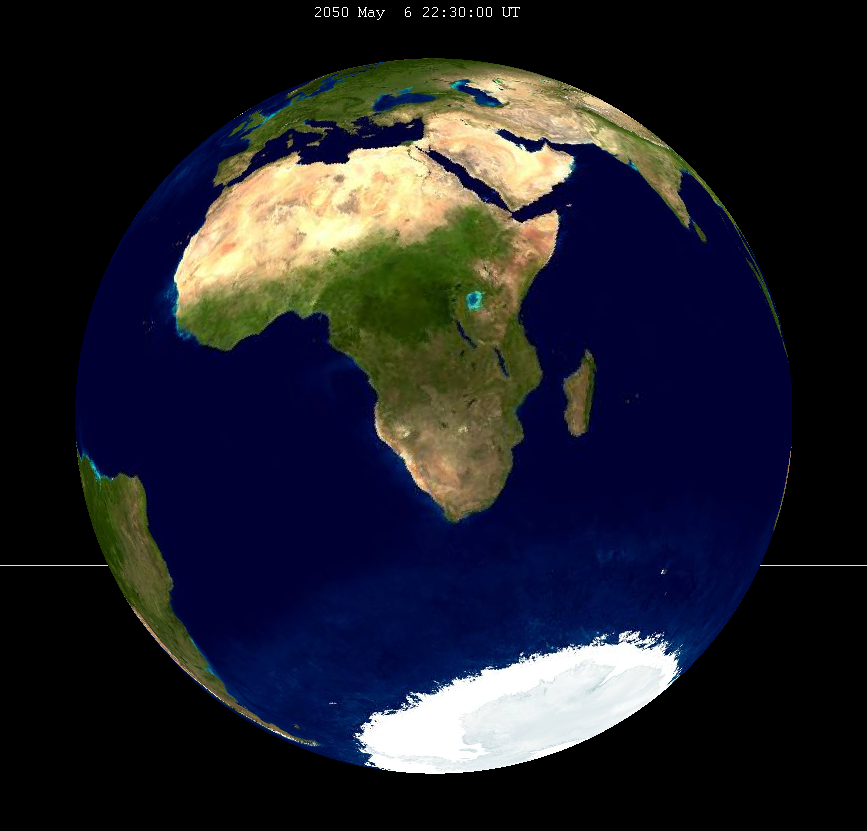
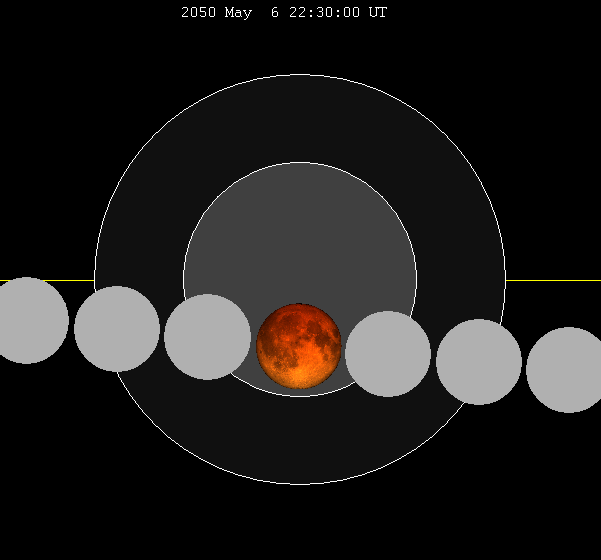

== Eclipse details ==
Shown below is a table displaying details about this particular luanr eclipse. It describes various parameters pertaining to this eclipse.

May 6, 2050 Lunar Eclipse Parameters
Parameter	Value
Penumbral Magnitude	2.10642
Umbral Magnitude	1.07790
Gamma	−0.41809
Sun Right Ascension	02h56m30.8s
Sun Declination	+16°47'28.5"
Sun Semi-Diameter	15'51.3"
Sun Equatorial Horizontal Parallax	08.7"
Moon Right Ascension	14h56m12.1s
Moon Declination	-17°10'41.9"
Moon Semi-Diameter	15'24.9"
Moon Equatorial Horizontal Parallax	0°56'34.4"
ΔT	85.3 s

== Eclipse season ==
This eclipse is part of an eclipse season, a period, roughly every six months, when eclipses occur. Only two (or occasionally three) eclipse seasons occur each year, and each season lasts about 35 days and repeats just short of six months (173 days) later; thus two full eclipse seasons always occur each year. Either two or three eclipses happen each eclipse season. In the sequence below, each eclipse is separated by a fortnight.

Eclipse season of May 2050
May 6 Ascending node (full moon)	May 20 Descending node (new moon)
Total lunar eclipse Lunar Saros 122	Hybrid solar eclipse Solar Saros 148

== Related eclipses ==
=== Eclipses in 2050 ===
- A total lunar eclipse on May 6.
- A hybrid solar eclipse on May 20.
- A total lunar eclipse on October 30.
- A partial solar eclipse on November 14.

=== Metonic ===
- Preceded by: Lunar eclipse of July 18, 2046
- Followed by: Lunar eclipse of February 22, 2054

=== Tzolkinex ===
- Preceded by: Lunar eclipse of March 25, 2043
- Followed by: Lunar eclipse of June 17, 2057

=== Half-Saros ===
- Preceded by: Solar eclipse of April 30, 2041
- Followed by: Solar eclipse of May 11, 2059

=== Tritos ===
- Preceded by: Lunar eclipse of June 6, 2039
- Followed by: Lunar eclipse of April 4, 2061

=== Lunar Saros 122 ===
- Preceded by: Lunar eclipse of April 25, 2032
- Followed by: Lunar eclipse of May 17, 2068

=== Inex ===
- Preceded by: Lunar eclipse of May 26, 2021
- Followed by: Lunar eclipse of April 16, 2079

=== Triad ===
- Preceded by: Lunar eclipse of July 6, 1963
- Followed by: Lunar eclipse of March 7, 2137

=== Lunar eclipses of 2049–2052 ===
This eclipse is a member of a semester series. An eclipse in a semester series of lunar eclipses repeats approximately every 177 days and 4 hours (a semester) at alternating nodes of the Moon's orbit.

The penumbral lunar eclipse on June 15, 2049 occurs in the previous lunar year eclipse set.

Lunar eclipse series sets from 2049 to 2052
Ascending node				Descending node			
Saros	Date Viewing	Type Chart	Gamma	Saros	Date Viewing	Type Chart	Gamma
112	2049 May 17	Penumbral	−1.1337	117	2049 Nov 09	Penumbral	1.1964
122	2050 May 06	Total	−0.4181	127	2050 Oct 30	Total	0.4435
132	2051 Apr 26	Total	0.3371	137	2051 Oct 19	Total	−0.2542
142	2052 Apr 14	Penumbral	1.0628	147	2052 Oct 08	Partial	−0.9726

=== Metonic series ===
The Metonic cycle repeats nearly exactly every 19 years and represents a Saros cycle plus one lunar year. Because it occurs on the same calendar date, the Earth's shadow will in nearly the same location relative to the background stars.

This series has 9 events centered on May 6th and October 30th: (saros number)

Ascending node	Descending node
1. 2031 May 07.160 - penumbral (112); 2. 2050 May 06.937 - total (122); 3. 2069 May 06.380 - total (132); 4. 2088 May 05.677 - partial (142); 5. 2107 May 07.186 - penumbral (152)	1. 2031 Oct 30.323 - penumbral (117); 2. 2050 Oct 30.139 - total (127); 3. 2069 Oct 30.148 - total (137); 4. 2088 Oct 30.125 - partial (147)

=== Saros 122 ===
This eclipse is a part of Saros series 122, repeating every 18 years, 11 days, and containing 74 events. The series started with a penumbral lunar eclipse on August 14, 1022. It contains partial eclipses from April 10, 1419 through June 24, 1545; total eclipses from July 5, 1563 through May 6, 2050; and a second set of partial eclipses from May 17, 2068 through July 21, 2176. The series ends at member 74 as a penumbral eclipse on October 29, 2338.

The longest duration of totality was produced by member 39 at 100 minutes, 5 seconds on October 11, 1707. All eclipses in this series occur at the Moon’s ascending node of orbit.

Greatest	First			
The greatest eclipse of the series occurred on 1707 Oct 11, lasting 100 minutes, 5 seconds.	Penumbral	Partial	Total	Central
The greatest eclipse of the series occurred on 1707 Oct 11, lasting 100 minutes, 5 seconds.	1022 Aug 14	1419 Apr 10	1563 Jul 05	1617 Aug 16
The greatest eclipse of the series occurred on 1707 Oct 11, lasting 100 minutes, 5 seconds.	Last			
The greatest eclipse of the series occurred on 1707 Oct 11, lasting 100 minutes, 5 seconds.	Central	Total	Partial	Penumbral
The greatest eclipse of the series occurred on 1707 Oct 11, lasting 100 minutes, 5 seconds.	1996 Apr 04	2050 May 06	2176 Jul 21	2338 Oct 29

Eclipses are tabulated in three columns; every third eclipse in the same column is one exeligmos apart, so they all cast shadows over approximately the same parts of the Earth.

Series members 45–66 occur between 1801 and 2200:
45	46	47
1815 Dec 16	1833 Dec 26	1852 Jan 07
48	49	50
1870 Jan 17	1888 Jan 28	1906 Feb 09
51	52	53
1924 Feb 20	1942 Mar 03	1960 Mar 13
54	55	56
1978 Mar 24	1996 Apr 04	2014 Apr 15
57	58	59
2032 Apr 25	2050 May 06	2068 May 17
60	61	62
2086 May 28	2104 Jun 08	2122 Jun 20
63	64	65
2140 Jun 30	2158 Jul 11	2176 Jul 21
66
2194 Aug 02

=== Tritos series ===
This eclipse is a part of a tritos cycle, repeating at alternating nodes every 135 synodic months (≈ 3986.63 days, or 11 years minus 1 month). Their appearance and longitude are irregular due to a lack of synchronization with the anomalistic month (period of perigee), but groupings of 3 tritos cycles (≈ 33 years minus 3 months) come close (≈ 434.044 anomalistic months), so eclipses are similar in these groupings.

Series members between 1801 and 2200
1810 Mar 21 (Saros 100)	1821 Feb 17 (Saros 101)	1832 Jan 17 (Saros 102)	1842 Dec 17 (Saros 103)	
1864 Oct 15 (Saros 105)	1875 Sep 15 (Saros 106)	1886 Aug 14 (Saros 107)	1897 Jul 14 (Saros 108)	1908 Jun 14 (Saros 109)
1919 May 15 (Saros 110)	1930 Apr 13 (Saros 111)	1941 Mar 13 (Saros 112)	1952 Feb 11 (Saros 113)	1963 Jan 09 (Saros 114)
1973 Dec 10 (Saros 115)	1984 Nov 08 (Saros 116)	1995 Oct 08 (Saros 117)	2006 Sep 07 (Saros 118)	2017 Aug 07 (Saros 119)
2028 Jul 06 (Saros 120)	2039 Jun 06 (Saros 121)	2050 May 06 (Saros 122)	2061 Apr 04 (Saros 123)	2072 Mar 04 (Saros 124)
2083 Feb 02 (Saros 125)	2094 Jan 01 (Saros 126)	2104 Dec 02 (Saros 127)	2115 Nov 02 (Saros 128)	2126 Oct 01 (Saros 129)
2137 Aug 30 (Saros 130)	2148 Jul 31 (Saros 131)	2159 Jun 30 (Saros 132)	2170 May 30 (Saros 133)	2181 Apr 29 (Saros 134)
2192 Mar 28 (Saros 135)

=== Inex series ===
This eclipse is a part of the long period inex cycle, repeating at alternating nodes, every 358 synodic months (≈ 10,571.95 days, or 29 years minus 20 days). Their appearance and longitude are irregular due to a lack of synchronization with the anomalistic month (period of perigee). However, groupings of 3 inex cycles (≈ 87 years minus 2 months) comes close (≈ 1,151.02 anomalistic months), so eclipses are similar in these groupings.

Series members between 1801 and 2200
1818 Oct 14 (Saros 114)	1847 Sep 24 (Saros 115)	1876 Sep 03 (Saros 116)
1905 Aug 15 (Saros 117)	1934 Jul 26 (Saros 118)	1963 Jul 06 (Saros 119)
1992 Jun 15 (Saros 120)	2021 May 26 (Saros 121)	2050 May 06 (Saros 122)
2079 Apr 16 (Saros 123)	2108 Mar 27 (Saros 124)	2137 Mar 07 (Saros 125)
2166 Feb 15 (Saros 126)	2195 Jan 26 (Saros 127)	

=== Half-Saros cycle ===
A lunar eclipse will be preceded and followed by solar eclipses by 9 years and 5.5 days (a half saros). This lunar eclipse is related to two partial solar eclipses of Solar Saros 129.

April 30, 2041	May 11, 2059

== See also ==
- List of lunar eclipses and List of 21st-century lunar eclipses
- Tetrad
