= March 1978 lunar eclipse =

Total lunar eclipse March 24, 1978

- Total eclipse
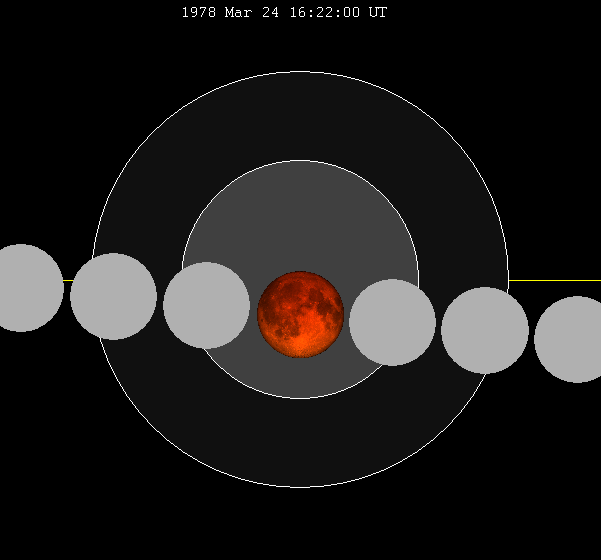
- The Moon's hourly motion shown right to left
- Date: March 24, 1978
- Gamma: −0.2140
- Magnitude: 1.4518
- Saros cycle: 122 (54 of 75)
- Totality: 90 minutes, 40 seconds
- Partiality: 218 minutes, 33 seconds
- Penumbral: 344 minutes, 56 seconds
Contacts (UTC)
- P1: 13:29:51
- U1: 14:33:07
- U2: 15:37:03
- Greatest: 16:22:22
- U3: 17:07:43
- U4: 18:11:40
- P4: 19:14:47

External image
- http://www.phys.ttu.edu/~ozprof/le24378.htm

A total lunar eclipse occurred at the Moon’s ascending node of orbit on Friday, March 24, 1978, with an umbral magnitude of 1.4518. It was a central lunar eclipse, in which part of the Moon passed through the center of the Earth's shadow. A lunar eclipse occurs when the Moon moves into the Earth's shadow, causing the Moon to be darkened. A total lunar eclipse occurs when the Moon's near side entirely passes into the Earth's umbral shadow. Unlike a solar eclipse, which can only be viewed from a relatively small area of the world, a lunar eclipse may be viewed from anywhere on the night side of Earth. A total lunar eclipse can last up to nearly two hours, while a total solar eclipse lasts only a few minutes at any given place, because the Moon's shadow is smaller. The Moon's apparent diameter was near the average diameter because it occurred 7.1 days after apogee (on March 17, 1978, at 14:25 UTC) and 6.6 days before perigee (on March 31, 1978, at 5:45 UTC).

== Visibility ==
The eclipse was completely visible over much of Asia and Australia, seen rising over Africa, Europe, and west and central Asia and setting over western North America and the central Pacific Ocean.

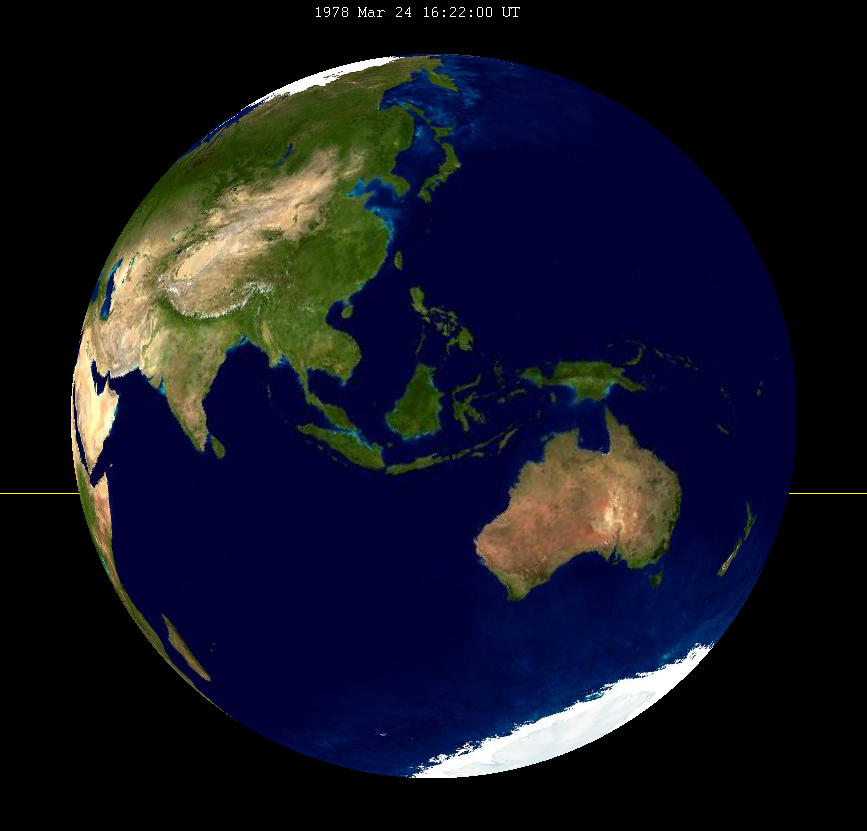
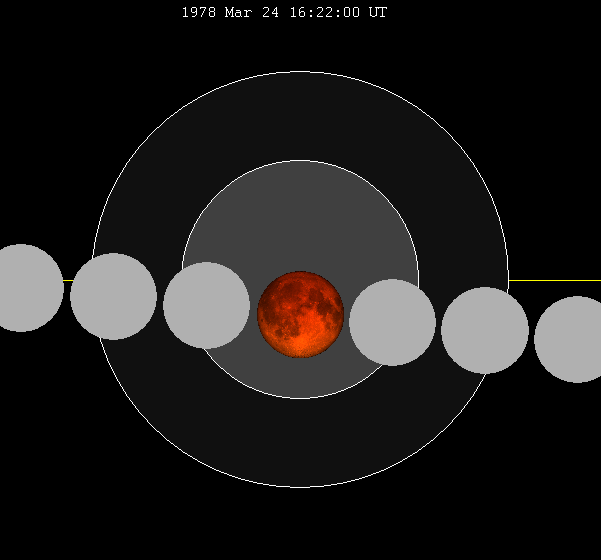

== Eclipse details ==
Shown below is a table displaying details about this particular solar eclipse. It describes various parameters pertaining to this eclipse.

March 24, 1978 Lunar Eclipse Parameters
Parameter	Value
Penumbral Magnitude	2.47900
Umbral Magnitude	1.45179
Gamma	−0.21402
Sun Right Ascension	00h13m28.3s
Sun Declination	+01°27'32.7"
Sun Semi-Diameter	16'02.4"
Sun Equatorial Horizontal Parallax	08.8"
Moon Right Ascension	12h13m13.4s
Moon Declination	-01°39'13.7"
Moon Semi-Diameter	15'36.9"
Moon Equatorial Horizontal Parallax	0°57'18.4"
ΔT	48.8 s

== Eclipse season ==
This eclipse is part of an eclipse season, a period, roughly every six months, when eclipses occur. Only two (or occasionally three) eclipse seasons occur each year, and each season lasts about 35 days and repeats just short of six months (173 days) later; thus two full eclipse seasons always occur each year. Either two or three eclipses happen each eclipse season. In the sequence below, each eclipse is separated by a fortnight.

Eclipse season of March–April 1978
March 24 Ascending node (full moon)	April 7 Descending node (new moon)
Total lunar eclipse Lunar Saros 122	Partial solar eclipse Solar Saros 148

== Related eclipses ==
=== Eclipses in 1978 ===
- A total lunar eclipse on March 24.
- A partial solar eclipse on April 7.
- A total lunar eclipse on September 16.
- A partial solar eclipse on October 2.

=== Metonic ===
- Preceded by: Lunar eclipse of June 4, 1974
- Followed by: Lunar eclipse of January 9, 1982

=== Tzolkinex ===
- Preceded by: Lunar eclipse of February 10, 1971
- Followed by: Lunar eclipse of May 4, 1985

=== Half-Saros ===
- Preceded by: Solar eclipse of March 18, 1969
- Followed by: Solar eclipse of March 29, 1987

=== Tritos ===
- Preceded by: Lunar eclipse of April 24, 1967
- Followed by: Lunar eclipse of February 20, 1989

=== Lunar Saros 122 ===
- Preceded by: Lunar eclipse of March 13, 1960
- Followed by: Lunar eclipse of April 4, 1996

=== Inex ===
- Preceded by: Lunar eclipse of April 13, 1949
- Followed by: Lunar eclipse of March 3, 2007

=== Triad ===
- Preceded by: Lunar eclipse of May 23, 1891
- Followed by: Lunar eclipse of January 22, 2065

=== Lunar eclipses of 1977–1980 ===
This eclipse is a member of a semester series. An eclipse in a semester series of lunar eclipses repeats approximately every 177 days and 4 hours (a semester) at alternating nodes of the Moon's orbit.

The penumbral lunar eclipse on July 27, 1980 occurs in the next lunar year eclipse set.

Lunar eclipse series sets from 1977 to 1980
Ascending node				Descending node			
Saros	Date Viewing	Type Chart	Gamma	Saros	Date Viewing	Type Chart	Gamma
112	1977 Apr 04	Partial	−0.9148	117	1977 Sep 27	Penumbral	1.0768
122	1978 Mar 24	Total	−0.2140	127	1978 Sep 16	Total	0.2951
132	1979 Mar 13	Partial	0.5254	137	1979 Sep 06	Total	−0.4305
142	1980 Mar 01	Penumbral	1.2270	147	1980 Aug 26	Penumbral	−1.1608

=== Saros 122 ===
This eclipse is a part of Saros series 122, repeating every 18 years, 11 days, and containing 74 events. The series started with a penumbral lunar eclipse on August 14, 1022. It contains partial eclipses from April 10, 1419 through June 24, 1545; total eclipses from July 5, 1563 through May 6, 2050; and a second set of partial eclipses from May 17, 2068 through July 21, 2176. The series ends at member 74 as a penumbral eclipse on October 29, 2338.

The longest duration of totality was produced by member 39 at 100 minutes, 5 seconds on October 11, 1707. All eclipses in this series occur at the Moon’s ascending node of orbit.

Greatest	First			
The greatest eclipse of the series occurred on 1707 Oct 11, lasting 100 minutes, 5 seconds.	Penumbral	Partial	Total	Central
The greatest eclipse of the series occurred on 1707 Oct 11, lasting 100 minutes, 5 seconds.	1022 Aug 14	1419 Apr 10	1563 Jul 05	1617 Aug 16
The greatest eclipse of the series occurred on 1707 Oct 11, lasting 100 minutes, 5 seconds.	Last			
The greatest eclipse of the series occurred on 1707 Oct 11, lasting 100 minutes, 5 seconds.	Central	Total	Partial	Penumbral
The greatest eclipse of the series occurred on 1707 Oct 11, lasting 100 minutes, 5 seconds.	1996 Apr 04	2050 May 06	2176 Jul 21	2338 Oct 29

Eclipses are tabulated in three columns; every third eclipse in the same column is one exeligmos apart, so they all cast shadows over approximately the same parts of the Earth.

Series members 45–66 occur between 1801 and 2200:
45	46	47
1815 Dec 16	1833 Dec 26	1852 Jan 07
48	49	50
1870 Jan 17	1888 Jan 28	1906 Feb 09
51	52	53
1924 Feb 20	1942 Mar 03	1960 Mar 13
54	55	56
1978 Mar 24	1996 Apr 04	2014 Apr 15
57	58	59
2032 Apr 25	2050 May 06	2068 May 17
60	61	62
2086 May 28	2104 Jun 08	2122 Jun 20
63	64	65
2140 Jun 30	2158 Jul 11	2176 Jul 21
66
2194 Aug 02

=== Tritos series ===
This eclipse is a part of a tritos cycle, repeating at alternating nodes every 135 synodic months (≈ 3986.63 days, or 11 years minus 1 month). Their appearance and longitude are irregular due to a lack of synchronization with the anomalistic month (period of perigee), but groupings of 3 tritos cycles (≈ 33 years minus 3 months) come close (≈ 434.044 anomalistic months), so eclipses are similar in these groupings.

Series members between 1801 and 2200
1803 Aug 03 (Saros 106)	1814 Jul 02 (Saros 107)	1825 Jun 01 (Saros 108)	1836 May 01 (Saros 109)	1847 Mar 31 (Saros 110)
1858 Feb 27 (Saros 111)	1869 Jan 28 (Saros 112)	1879 Dec 28 (Saros 113)	1890 Nov 26 (Saros 114)	1901 Oct 27 (Saros 115)
1912 Sep 26 (Saros 116)	1923 Aug 26 (Saros 117)	1934 Jul 26 (Saros 118)	1945 Jun 25 (Saros 119)	1956 May 24 (Saros 120)
1967 Apr 24 (Saros 121)	1978 Mar 24 (Saros 122)	1989 Feb 20 (Saros 123)	2000 Jan 21 (Saros 124)	2010 Dec 21 (Saros 125)
2021 Nov 19 (Saros 126)	2032 Oct 18 (Saros 127)	2043 Sep 19 (Saros 128)	2054 Aug 18 (Saros 129)	2065 Jul 17 (Saros 130)
2076 Jun 17 (Saros 131)	2087 May 17 (Saros 132)	2098 Apr 15 (Saros 133)	2109 Mar 17 (Saros 134)	2120 Feb 14 (Saros 135)
2131 Jan 13 (Saros 136)	2141 Dec 13 (Saros 137)	2152 Nov 12 (Saros 138)	2163 Oct 12 (Saros 139)	2174 Sep 11 (Saros 140)
2185 Aug 11 (Saros 141)	2196 Jul 10 (Saros 142)			

=== Inex series ===
This eclipse is a part of the long period inex cycle, repeating at alternating nodes, every 358 synodic months (≈ 10,571.95 days, or 29 years minus 20 days). Their appearance and longitude are irregular due to a lack of synchronization with the anomalistic month (period of perigee). However, groupings of 3 inex cycles (≈ 87 years minus 2 months) comes close (≈ 1,151.02 anomalistic months), so eclipses are similar in these groupings.

Series members between 1801 and 2200
1804 Jul 22 (Saros 116)	1833 Jul 02 (Saros 117)	1862 Jun 12 (Saros 118)
1891 May 23 (Saros 119)	1920 May 03 (Saros 120)	1949 Apr 13 (Saros 121)
1978 Mar 24 (Saros 122)	2007 Mar 03 (Saros 123)	2036 Feb 11 (Saros 124)
2065 Jan 22 (Saros 125)	2094 Jan 01 (Saros 126)	2122 Dec 13 (Saros 127)
2151 Nov 24 (Saros 128)	2180 Nov 02 (Saros 129)	

=== Half-Saros cycle ===
A lunar eclipse will be preceded and followed by solar eclipses by 9 years and 5.5 days (a half saros). This lunar eclipse is related to two solar eclipses of Solar Saros 129.

March 18, 1969	March 29, 1987

== See also ==
- List of lunar eclipses
- List of 20th-century lunar eclipses
