= List of central lunar eclipses =

The orange Moon shows a central lunar eclipse.

A central lunar eclipse is a lunar eclipse in which part of the Moon passes through the center of Earth's shadow. This type of lunar eclipse typically appears darker than other lunar eclipses. They are relatively rare in the 21st century as there are only 24 of them, however they are statistically more common than non-central total lunar eclipses. In order for a lunar eclipse to be classified as a central lunar eclipse, its gamma must be between -0.2725 and 0.2725.

Central lunar eclipses are always total lunar eclipses and have large umbral eclipse magnitude, long duration and small value of gamma.

== List of central lunar eclipses ==
=== 1901–1950 ===
There were 20 central lunar eclipses in this period.

Saros	Eclipse	Visibility	Chart	Gamma	Magnitude	Duration penumbral (min)	Duration partial (min)	Duration total (min)
120e	1902 Apr 22			-0.2680	1.3327	364.4	224.6	84.6
125	1902 Oct 17			0.2201	1.4566	330.5	212.3	88.8
122	1906 Feb 09			-0.1199	1.6254	342.9	219.5	97.8
127	1906 Aug 04			0.0477	1.7794	334.1	218.7	101.2
124e	1909 Nov 27			-0.2713	1.3660	323.0	206.5	81.2
121	1913 Mar 22			0.1671	1.5683	319.8	209.4	92.8
126	1913 Sep 15			-0.2109	1.4304	373.1	230.6	93.5
123	1917 Jan 08			0.2415	1.3642	373.2	227.4	87.6
128	1917 Jul 04			0.1419	1.6185	323.0	212.8	96.0
125e	1920 Oct 27			0.2502	1.3987	331.0	211.2	85.0
122	1924 Feb 20			-0.1338	1.5995	343.7	219.7	97.1
127	1924 Aug 14			0.1175	1.6519	332.1	216.9	98.2
121	1931 Apr 02			0.2043	1.5021	318.0	207.9	89.6
126e	1931 Sep 26			-0.2698	1.3208	371.3	226.9	84.2
123	1935 Jan 19			0.2498	1.3499	372.2	226.7	86.3
128	1935 Jul 16			0.0672	1.7542	325.1	214.8	99.6
122	1942 Mar 03			-0.1545	1.5612	344.4	219.7	95.9
127	1942 Aug 26			0.1818	1.5344	329.6	214.2	93.4
129b	1946 Jun 14			-0.2324	1.3983	369.3	229.1	91.1
121e	1949 Apr 13			0.2474	1.4251	315.9	205.7	84.9

=== 1951–2000 ===
There were 13 central lunar eclipses in this period.

Saros	Eclipse	Viewing	Chart	Gamma	Magnitude	Duration penumbral (min)	Duration partial (min)	Duration total (min)
123e	1953 Jan 29			0.2606	1.3314	371.1	225.8	84.5
128g	1953 Jul 26			-0.0071	1.8629	326.6	215.7	100.7
122	1960 Mar 13			-0.1799	1.5145	344.9	219.4	94.0
127e	1960 Sep 05			0.2422	1.4239	326.8	210.9	86.7
129	1964 Jun 25			-0.1461	1.5565	372.2	233.3	100.8
128	1971 Aug 06			-0.0794	1.7283	327.4	215.5	99.4
130b	1975 May 25			0.2367	1.4253	336.0	215.2	88.3
122	1978 Mar 24			-0.2140	1.4518	345.0	218.6	90.7
129	1982 Jul 06			-0.0579	1.7180	374.0	235.6	105.7
128	1989 Aug 17			-0.1491	1.5984	327.6	214.3	95.8
130	1993 Jun 04			0.1638	1.5617	336.4	217.9	95.8
122e	1996 Apr 04			-0.2534	1.3795	344.8	217.2	85.8
129g	2000 Jul 16			0.0302	1.7684	374.5	236.0	106.4

=== 2001–2050 ===
There are 10 central lunar eclipses in this period.

Saros	Eclipse	Viewing	Chart	Gamma	Magnitude	Duration penumbral (min)	Duration partial (min)	Duration total (min)
128e	2007 Aug 28			-0.2146	1.4758	327.4	212.2	90.0
130	2011 Jun 15			0.0897	1.6999	336.2	219.3	100.2
129	2018 Jul 27			0.1168	1.6087	373.9	234.6	103.0
131b	2022 May 16			-0.2532	1.4137	318.8	207.3	84.9
136b	2022 Nov 08			0.2570	1.3589	354.0	219.9	85.0
130g	2029 Jun 26			0.0124	1.8436	335.2	219.6	101.9
129e	2036 Aug 07			0.2004	1.4544	372.2	231.4	95.3
131	2040 May 26			-0.1872	1.5348	321.5	210.8	92.3
136	2040 Nov 18			0.2361	1.3974	353.7	220.5	87.8
130	2047 Jul 07			-0.0636	1.7513	333.6	218.6	100.8

=== 2051–2100 ===
There will be 14 central lunar eclipses in this period.

Saros	Eclipse	Viewing	Chart	Gamma	Magnitude	Duration penumbral (min)	Duration partial (min)	Duration total (min)
137b	2051 Oct 19			-0.2542	1.4118	314.3	204.3	83.6
131	2058 Jun 06			-0.1181	1.6612	323.7	213.4	97.3
136	2058 Nov 30			0.2208	1.4260	353.1	220.7	89.7
130	2065 Jul 17			-0.1402	1.6121	331.2	216.3	97.0
132b	2069 May 06			0.2717	1.3230	368.2	226.2	84.3
137	2069 Oct 30			-0.2263	1.4616	315.5	205.6	86.8
131	2076 Jun 17			-0.0452	1.7943	325.5	215.1	100.2
136	2076 Dec 10			0.2102	1.4460	352.3	220.6	90.8
130e	2083 Jul 29			-0.2143	1.4773	328.1	212.9	90.4
132	2087 May 17			0.1999	1.4555	371.1	230.7	95.1
137	2087 Nov 10			-0.2043	1.5006	316.3	206.6	88.9
131g	2094 Jun 28			0.0288	1.8234	326.6	215.7	100.6
136	2094 Dec 21			0.2016	1.4627	351.3	220.5	91.6
133b	2098 Apr 15			-0.2272	1.4370	338.4	215.8	89.0

=== 2101-2150 ===
There will be 21 central lunar eclipses in this period.

Saros	Eclipse	Viewing	Chart	Gamma	Magnitude	Duration penumbral (min)	Duration partial (min)	Duration total (min)
132	2105 May 28			0.1227	1.5977	373.2	234.0	102.4
137	2105 Nov 21			-0.1875	1.5301	317.4	207.3	90.4
139b	2109 Sep 09			-0.2608	1.3568	355.3	221.6	85.6
131	2112 Jul 09			0.1055	1.6814	327.0	215.2	98.4
136	2113 Jan 02			0.1964	1.4735	350.2	220.2	92.1
133	2116 Apr 27			-0.1746	1.5364	338.2	217.7	94.6
138b	2116 Oct 21			0.2353	1.3943	360.6	223.9	88.8
132g	2123 Jun 09			0.0406	1.7488	374.4	235.8	106.1
137	2123 Dec 03			-0.1755	1.5507	318.1	207.8	91.4
134b	2127 Mar 28			0.2664	1.3849	318.1	205.5	82.3
139	2127 Sep 20			-0.2007	1.4672	356.3	224.2	93.5
131	2130 Jul 21			0.1803	1.5426	326.7	213.4	93.6
136	2131 Jan 13			0.1915	1.4842	349.0	219.9	92.5
133	2134 May 08			-0.1152	1.6482	337.7	219.0	98.8
138	2134 Nov 02			0.2022	1.4522	363.2	226.0	93.0
132	2141 Jun 19			-0.0446	1.7415	374.5	235.9	106.1
137	2141 Dec 13			-0.1671	1.5652	318.8	208.2	92.0
134	2145 Apr 07			0.2285	1.4550	319.9	207.9	87.3
139	2145 Sep 30			-0.1486	1.5628	356.6	225.7	98.2
131e	2148 Jul 31			0.2554	1.4030	325.8	210.4	85.3
136	2149 Jan 23			0.1859	1.4962	347.8	219.6	93.0

=== 2151-2200 ===
There will be 24 central lunar eclipses in this period.

Saros	Eclipse	Viewing	Chart	Gamma	Magnitude	Duration penumbral (min)	Duration partial (min)	Duration total (min)
133	2152 May 18			-0.0511	1.7688	336.8	219.7	101.2
138	2152 Nov 12			0.1753	1.4989	365.5	227.5	95.8
140b	2156 Aug 30			0.2569	1.4132	313.1	204.6	83.9
132	2159 Jun 30			-0.1323	1.5809	373.5	234.1	102.0
137	2159 Dec 24			-0.1619	1.5737	319.3	208.5	92.4
134	2163 Apr 19			0.1858	1.5338	321.6	210.2	91.8
139	2163 Oct 12			-0.1026	1.6471	356.4	226.3	100.9
136	2167 Feb 04			0.1772	1.5143	346.5	219.5	93.8
133g	2170 May 30			0.0174	1.8330	335.4	219.4	101.7
138	2170 Nov 23			0.1554	1.5331	367.3	228.7	97.7
135b	2174 Mar 18			-0.2605	1.3371	369.5	226.0	85.2
140	2174 Sep 11			0.1982	1.5197	315.1	207.3	90.3
132e	2177 Jul 11			-0.2199	1.4199	371.3	230.4	93.0
137	2178 Jan 04			-0.1570	1.5820	319.9	208.8	92.8
134	2181 Apr 29			0.1345	1.6281	323.4	212.4	95.9
139	2181 Oct 22			-0.0652	1.7157	355.8	226.4	102.2
136	2185 Feb 14			0.1660	1.5372	345.2	219.4	94.8
133	2188 Jun 09			0.0887	1.7045	333.3	218.0	99.8
138	2188 Dec 04			0.1394	1.5602	369.0	229.6	98.9
135	2192 Mar 28			-0.2202	1.4120	371.2	228.8	91.6
140	2192 Sep 21			0.1453	1.6154	316.6	209.1	94.4
137	2196 Jan 15			-0.1537	1.5877	320.4	209.1	93.1
134	2199 May 10			0.0792	1.7297	324.9	214.1	98.8
139	2199 Nov 02			-0.0339	1.7731	355.0	226.1	102.7

== See also ==
- List of lunar eclipses
  - List of 20th-century lunar eclipses
  - List of 21st-century lunar eclipses
  - List of 22nd-century lunar eclipses
- List of Saros series for lunar eclipses
