= Lunar Saros 122 =

Series of lunar eclipses

Member 55	Member 56
April 4, 1996	April 15, 2014

Saros cycle series 122 for lunar eclipses occurs at the moon's ascending node, every 18 years 11 and 1/3 days. It contains 74 events.

This lunar saros is linked to Solar Saros 129.

Cat.	Saros	Mem	Date	Time UT (hr:mn)	Type	Gamma	Magnitude	Duration (min)			Contacts UT (hr:mn)						Chart
Cat.	Saros	Mem	Date	Greatest	Type	Gamma	Magnitude	Pen.	Par.	Tot.	P1	P4	U1	U2	U3	U4	Chart
07272	122	1	1022 Aug 14	14:51:42	Penumbral	1.5452	-0.9639	25.6			14:38:54	15:04:30					
07316	122	2	1040 Aug 24	22:35:38	Penumbral	1.4885	-0.8599	91.2			21:50:02	23:21:14					
07361	122	3	1058 Sep 05	6:27:56	Penumbral	1.4381	-0.7676	121.8			5:27:02	7:28:50					
07405	122	4	1076 Sep 15	14:28:39	Penumbral	1.3941	-0.6871	142.5			13:17:24	15:39:54					
07451	122	5	1094 Sep 26	22:38:25	Penumbral	1.3568	-0.6191	157.4			21:19:43	23:57:07					
07497	122	6	1112 Oct 7	6:57:02	Penumbral	1.3264	-0.5637	168.2			5:32:56	8:21:08					
07543	122	7	1130 Oct 18	15:22:48	Penumbral	1.3014	-0.5182	176.3			13:54:39	16:50:57					
07589	122	8	1148 Oct 28	23:56:59	Penumbral	1.283	-0.4848	181.8			22:26:05	1:27:53					
07637	122	9	1166 Nov 9	8:37:08	Penumbral	1.2696	-0.4603	185.6			7:04:20	10:09:56					
07683	122	10	1184 Nov 19	17:23:21	Penumbral	1.2607	-0.444	187.9			15:49:24	18:57:18					
07729	122	11	1202 Dec 01	2:11:52	Penumbral	1.2534	-0.4306	189.7			0:37:01	3:46:43					
07775	122	12	1220 Dec 11	11:03:49	Penumbral	1.2491	-0.4222	190.6			9:28:31	12:39:07					
07821	122	13	1238 Dec 22	19:55:49	Penumbral	1.2449	-0.4139	191.5			18:20:04	21:31:34					
07866	122	14	1257 Jan 02	4:47:00	Penumbral	1.2402	-0.4043	192.4			3:10:48	6:23:12					
07910	122	15	1275 Jan 13	13:35:00	Penumbral	1.2330	-0.3902	194.0			11:58:00	15:12:00					
07955	122	16	1293 Jan 23	22:19:22	Penumbral	1.2230	-0.3706	196.3			20:41:13	23:57:31					
08000	122	17	1311 Feb 04	6:58:29	Penumbral	1.2089	-0.3435	199.5			5:18:44	8:38:14					
08043	122	18	1329 Feb 14	15:30:42	Penumbral	1.1896	-0.3066	204.0			13:48:42	17:12:42					
08084	122	19	1347 Feb 25	23:56:18	Penumbral	1.1650	-0.2600	209.6			22:11:30	1:41:06					
08126	122	20	1365 Mar 08	8:14:22	Penumbral	1.1345	-0.2025	216.2			6:26:16	10:02:28					
08167	122	21	1383 Mar 19	16:24:19	Penumbral	1.0974	-0.1330	223.9			14:32:22	18:16:16					
08208	122	22	1401 Mar 30	0:26:41	Penumbral	1.0541	-0.0523	232.3			22:30:32	2:22:50					
08249	122	23	1419 Apr 10	8:21:39	Partial	1.0048	0.0393	241.3	43.0		6:21:00	10:22:18	8:00:09			8:43:09	
08291	122	24	1437 Apr 20	16:10:28	Partial	0.9505	0.1399	250.4	80.0		14:05:16	18:15:40	15:30:28			16:50:28	
08332	122	25	1455 May 1	23:51:27	Partial	0.8897	0.2522	259.7	105.8		21:41:36	2:01:18	22:58:33			0:44:21	
08373	122	26	1473 May 12	7:28:21	Partial	0.8256	0.3703	268.7	126.1		5:14:00	9:42:42	6:25:18			8:31:24	
08412	122	27	1491 May 23	15:00:00	Partial	0.7569	0.4965	277.4	143.5		12:41:18	17:18:42	13:48:15			16:11:45	
08452	122	28	1509 Jun 02	22:29:18	Partial	0.6866	0.6253	285.4	158.0		20:06:36	0:52:00	21:10:18			23:48:18	
08493	122	29	1527 Jun 14	5:54:52	Partial	0.6134	0.7593	293.0	170.6		3:28:22	8:21:22	4:29:34			7:20:10	
08534	122	30	1545 Jun 24	13:21:01	Partial	0.5409	0.8916	299.6	181.0		10:51:13	15:50:49	11:50:31			14:51:31	
08577	122	31	1563 Jul 05	20:46:26	Total	0.4678	1.0245	305.6	189.7	23.4	18:13:38	23:19:14	19:11:35	20:34:44	20:58:08	22:21:17	
08620	122	32	1581 Jul 16	4:13:15	Total	0.3965	1.1541	310.7	196.9	56.5	1:37:54	6:48:36	2:34:48	3:45:00	4:41:30	5:51:42	
08664	122	33	1599 Aug 06	11:42:06	Total	0.3272	1.2794	315.1	202.6	73.1	9:04:33	14:19:39	10:00:48	11:05:33	12:18:39	13:23:24	
08709	122	34	1617 Aug 16	19:15:10	Total	0.2621	1.3970	318.8	207.0	83.7	16:35:46	21:54:34	17:31:40	18:33:19	19:57:01	20:58:40	
08753	122	35	1635 Aug 28	2:53:01	Total	0.2013	1.5064	321.9	210.2	90.8	0:12:04	5:33:58	1:07:55	2:07:37	3:38:25	4:38:07	
08797	122	36	1653 Sep 07	10:35:26	Total	0.1448	1.6076	324.4	212.6	95.4	7:53:14	13:17:38	8:49:08	9:47:44	11:23:08	12:21:44	
08842	122	37	1671 Sep 18	18:25:15	Total	0.0951	1.6963	326.5	214.2	98.1	15:42:00	21:08:30	16:38:09	17:36:12	19:14:18	20:12:21	
08888	122	38	1689 Sep 29	2:21:15	Total	0.0509	1.7747	328.2	215.2	99.5	23:37:09	5:05:21	0:33:39	1:31:30	3:11:00	4:08:51	
08934	122	39	1707 Oct 11	10:24:59	Total	0.0139	1.8400	329.7	215.8	100.1	7:40:08	13:09:50	8:37:05	9:34:56	11:15:02	12:12:53	
08981	122	40	1725 Oct 21	18:34:41	Total	-0.0177	1.8302	331.0	216.1	100.1	15:49:11	21:20:11	16:46:38	17:44:38	19:24:44	20:22:44	
09027	122	41	1743 Nov 02	2:52:32	Total	-0.0421	1.7829	332.3	216.4	99.7	0:06:23	5:38:41	1:04:20	2:02:41	3:42:23	4:40:44	
09074	122	42	1761 Nov 12	11:15:47	Total	-0.0614	1.7449	333.5	216.6	99.3	8:29:02	14:02:32	9:27:29	10:26:08	12:05:26	13:04:05	
09120	122	43	1779 Nov 23	19:44:47	Total	-0.0752	1.7172	334.8	216.8	98.9	16:57:23	22:32:11	17:56:23	18:55:20	20:34:14	21:33:11	
09165	122	44	1797 Dec 04	4:17:57	Total	-0.0850	1.6971	336.0	217.0	98.6	1:29:57	7:05:57	2:29:27	3:28:39	5:07:15	6:06:27	
09210	122	45	1815 Dec 16	12:55:06	Total	-0.0906	1.6850	337.2	217.4	98.4	10:06:30	15:43:42	11:06:24	12:05:54	13:44:18	14:43:48	
09256	122	46	1833 Dec 26	21:32:54	Total	-0.0951	1.6749	338.4	217.8	98.3	18:43:42	0:22:06	19:44:00	20:43:45	22:22:03	23:21:48	
09303	122	47	1852 Jan 07	6:10:44	Total	-0.0991	1.6663	339.6	218.2	98.3	3:20:56	9:00:32	4:21:38	5:21:35	6:59:53	7:59:50	
09347	122	48	1870 Jan 17	14:46:33	Total	-0.1037	1.6566	340.7	218.7	98.2	11:56:12	17:36:54	12:57:12	13:57:27	15:35:39	16:35:54	
09390	122	49	1888 Jan 28	23:20:01	Total	-0.1095	1.6452	341.8	219.1	98.1	20:29:07	2:10:55	21:30:28	22:30:58	0:09:04	1:09:34	
09433	122	50	1906 Feb 09	7:46:58	Total	-0.1199	1.6254	342.8	219.4	97.8	4:55:34	10:38:22	5:57:16	6:58:04	8:35:52	9:36:40	
09475	122	51	1924 Feb 20	16:08:55	Total	-0.1338	1.5995	343.6	219.7	97.1	13:17:07	19:00:43	14:19:04	15:20:22	16:57:28	17:58:46	
09517	122	52	1942 Mar 03	0:21:54	Total	-0.1545	1.5612	344.3	219.7	95.9	21:29:45	3:14:03	22:32:03	23:33:57	1:09:51	2:11:45	
09558	122	53	1960 Mar 13	8:28:21	Total	-0.1799	1.5145	344.8	219.4	94.0	5:35:57	11:20:45	6:38:39	7:41:21	9:15:21	10:18:03	
09599	122	54	1978 Mar 24	16:23:11	Total	-0.2140	1.4518	344.9	218.5	90.7	13:30:44	19:15:38	14:33:56	15:37:50	17:08:32	18:12:26	
09640	122	55	1996 Apr 04	0:10:47	Total	-0.2534	1.3795	344.7	217.1	85.8	21:18:26	3:03:08	22:22:14	23:27:53	0:53:41	1:59:20	
09682	122	56	2014 Apr 15	7:46:48	Total	-0.3017	1.2907	343.9	214.7	77.8	4:54:51	10:38:45	5:59:27	7:07:54	8:25:42	9:34:09	
09723	122	57	2032 Apr 25	15:14:51	Total	-0.3558	1.1913	342.4	211.2	65.5	12:23:39	18:06:03	13:29:15	14:42:06	15:47:36	17:00:27	
09763	122	58	2050 May 06	22:32:02	Total	-0.4181	1.0767	340.0	206.0	43.2	19:42:02	1:22:02	20:49:02	22:10:26	22:53:38	0:15:02	
09804	122	59	2068 May 17	5:42:17	Partial	-0.4851	0.9532	336.6	199.0		2:53:59	8:30:35	4:02:47			7:21:47	
09845	122	60	2086 May 28	12:43:47	Partial	-0.5585	0.8180	332.0	189.4		9:57:47	15:29:47	11:09:05			14:18:29	
09887	122	61	2104 Jun 08	19:38:40	Partial	-0.6362	0.6746	325.9	176.8		16:55:43	22:21:37	18:10:16			21:07:04	
09929	122	62	2122 Jun 20	2:27:47	Partial	-0.7177	0.5240	318.3	160.2		23:48:38	5:06:56	1:07:41			3:47:53	
09972	122	63	2140 Jun 30	9:13:17	Partial	-0.8012	0.3695	308.9	138.2		6:38:50	11:47:44	8:04:11			10:22:23	
10016	122	64	2158 Jul 11	15:55:51	Partial	-0.8859	0.2126	297.8	107.6		13:26:57	18:24:45	15:02:03			16:49:39	
10059	122	65	2176 Jul 21	22:36:52	Partial	-0.9707	0.0553	284.6	56.3		20:14:34	0:59:10	22:08:43			23:05:01	
10102	122	66	2194 Aug 02	5:18:42	Penumbral	-1.0539	-0.0993	269.6			3:03:54	7:33:30					
10146	122	67	2212 Aug 13	12:02:09	Penumbral	-1.1349	-0.2499	252.6			9:55:51	14:08:27					
10190	122	68	2230 Aug 24	18:48:09	Penumbral	-1.2127	-0.3950	233.5			16:51:24	20:44:54					
10235	122	69	2248 Sep 04	1:38:56	Penumbral	-1.2857	-0.5314	212.4			23:52:44	3:25:08					
10281	122	70	2266 Sep 15	8:35:37	Penumbral	-1.3530	-0.6573	189.3			7:00:58	10:10:16					
10327	122	71	2284 Sep 25	15:39:31	Penumbral	-1.4139	-0.7716	164.2			14:17:25	17:01:37					
10373	122	72	2302 Oct 07	22:49:32	Penumbral	-1.4691	-0.8754	136.1			21:41:29	23:57:35					
10419	122	73	2320 Oct 18	6:08:39	Penumbral	-1.5163	-0.9645	104.8			5:16:15	7:01:03					
10465	122	74	2338 Oct 29	13:35:05	Penumbral	-1.5569	-1.0414	65.4			13:02:23	14:07:47					

== See also ==
- List of lunar eclipses
  - List of Saros series for lunar eclipses
