= Solar eclipse of May 11, 2059 =

Total eclipse

- Total eclipse
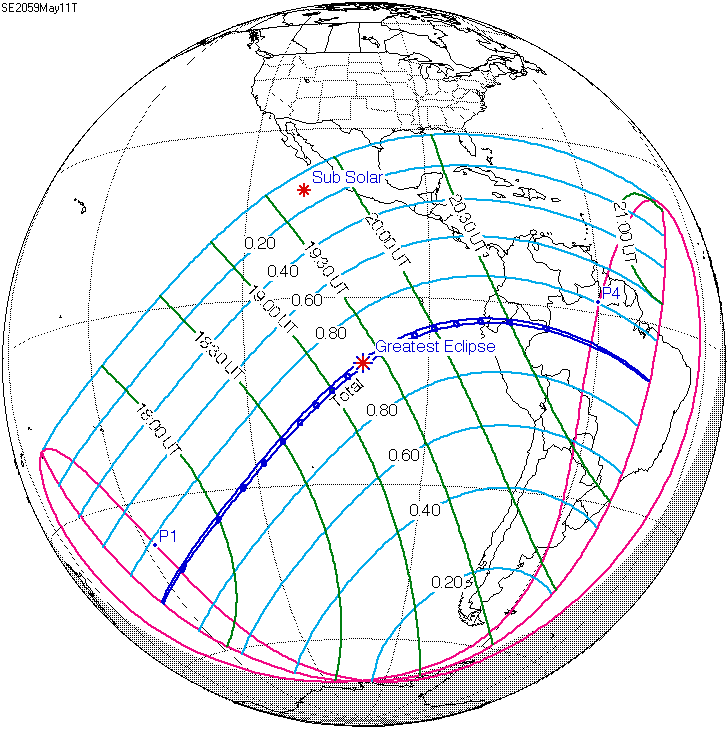
- Map
- Gamma: −0.508
- Magnitude: 1.0242

Maximum eclipse
- Duration: 143 s (2 min 23 s)
- Coordinates: 10.7°S 100.4°W
- Max. width of band: 95 km (59 mi)

Times (UTC)
- Greatest eclipse: 19:22:16

References
- Saros: 129 (54 of 80)
- Catalog # (SE5000): 9640

A total solar eclipse will occur at the Moon's ascending node of orbit on Sunday, May 11, 2059, with a magnitude of 1.0242. A solar eclipse occurs when the Moon passes between Earth and the Sun, thereby totally or partly obscuring the image of the Sun for a viewer on Earth. A total solar eclipse occurs when the Moon's apparent diameter is larger than the Sun's, blocking all direct sunlight, turning day into darkness. Totality occurs in a narrow path across Earth's surface, with the partial solar eclipse visible over a surrounding region thousands of kilometres wide. Occurring about 3.5 days after perigee (on May 8, 2059, at 7:40 UTC), the Moon's apparent diameter will be larger.

The path of totality will be visible from parts of Ecuador, Peru, extreme southern Colombia, and Brazil. A partial solar eclipse will also be visible for parts of eastern Oceania, South America, Central America, and the Caribbean.

== Eclipse details ==
Shown below are two tables displaying details about this particular solar eclipse. The first table outlines times at which the Moon's penumbra or umbra attains the specific parameter, and the second table describes various other parameters pertaining to this eclipse.

May 11, 2059 Solar Eclipse Times
Event	Time (UTC)
First Penumbral External Contact	2059 May 11 at 16:45:12.3 UTC
First Umbral External Contact	2059 May 11 at 17:49:14.5 UTC
First Central Line	2059 May 11 at 17:49:34.7 UTC
First Umbral Internal Contact	2059 May 11 at 17:49:54.9 UTC
Equatorial Conjunction	2059 May 11 at 19:01:24.2 UTC
Ecliptic Conjunction	2059 May 11 at 19:16:52.0 UTC
Greatest Eclipse	2059 May 11 at 19:22:15.6 UTC
Greatest Duration	2059 May 11 at 19:24:12.0 UTC
Last Umbral Internal Contact	2059 May 11 at 20:54:52.7 UTC
Last Central Line	2059 May 11 at 20:55:10.2 UTC
Last Umbral External Contact	2059 May 11 at 20:55:27.8 UTC
Last Penumbral External Contact	2059 May 11 at 21:59:32.9 UTC

May 11, 2059 Solar Eclipse Parameters
Parameter	Value
Eclipse Magnitude	1.02418
Eclipse Obscuration	1.04894
Gamma	−0.50795
Sun Right Ascension	03h14m47.9s
Sun Declination	+18°02'08.6"
Sun Semi-Diameter	15'50.2"
Sun Equatorial Horizontal Parallax	08.7"
Moon Right Ascension	03h15m32.3s
Moon Declination	+17°34'20.5"
Moon Semi-Diameter	15'59.6"
Moon Equatorial Horizontal Parallax	0°58'41.8"
ΔT	90.0 s

== Eclipse season ==
This eclipse is part of an eclipse season, a period, roughly every six months, when eclipses occur. Only two (or occasionally three) eclipse seasons occur each year, and each season lasts about 35 days and repeats just short of six months (173 days) later; thus two full eclipse seasons always occur each year. Either two or three eclipses happen each eclipse season. In the sequence below, each eclipse is separated by a fortnight.

Eclipse season of May 2059
May 11 Ascending node (new moon)	May 27 Descending node (full moon)
Total solar eclipse Solar Saros 129	Partial lunar eclipse Lunar Saros 141

== Related eclipses ==
=== Eclipses in 2059 ===
- A total solar eclipse on May 11.
- A partial lunar eclipse on May 27.
- An annular solar eclipse on November 5.
- A partial lunar eclipse on November 19.

=== Metonic ===
- Preceded by: Solar eclipse of July 24, 2055
- Followed by: Solar eclipse of February 28, 2063

=== Tzolkinex ===
- Preceded by: Solar eclipse of March 30, 2052
- Followed by: Solar eclipse of June 22, 2066

=== Half-Saros ===
- Preceded by: Lunar eclipse of May 6, 2050
- Followed by: Lunar eclipse of May 17, 2068

=== Tritos ===
- Preceded by: Solar eclipse of June 11, 2048
- Followed by: Solar eclipse of April 11, 2070

=== Solar Saros 129 ===
- Preceded by: Solar eclipse of April 30, 2041
- Followed by: Solar eclipse of May 22, 2077

=== Inex ===
- Preceded by: Solar eclipse of June 1, 2030
- Followed by: Solar eclipse of April 21, 2088

=== Triad ===
- Preceded by: Solar eclipse of July 10, 1972
- Followed by: Solar eclipse of March 12, 2146

=== Solar eclipses of 2058–2061 ===
This eclipse is a member of a semester series. An eclipse in a semester series of solar eclipses repeats approximately every 177 days and 4 hours (a semester) at alternating nodes of the Moon's orbit.

The partial solar eclipse on June 21, 2058 occurs in the previous lunar year eclipse set.

Solar eclipse series sets from 2058 to 2061
Ascending node			Descending node		
Saros	Map	Gamma	Saros	Map	Gamma
119	May 22, 2058 Partial	−1.3194	124	November 16, 2058 Partial	1.1224
129	May 11, 2059 Total	−0.508	134	November 5, 2059 Annular	0.4454
139	April 30, 2060 Total	0.2422	144	October 24, 2060 Annular	−0.2625
149	April 20, 2061 Total	0.9578	154	October 13, 2061 Annular	−0.9639

=== Saros 129 ===
This eclipse is a part of Saros series 129, repeating every 18 years, 11 days, and containing 80 events. The series started with a partial solar eclipse on October 3, 1103. It contains annular eclipses from May 6, 1464 through March 18, 1969; hybrid eclipses from March 29, 1987 through April 20, 2023; and total eclipses from April 30, 2041 through July 26, 2185. The series ends at member 80 as a partial eclipse on February 21, 2528. Its eclipses are tabulated in three columns; every third eclipse in the same column is one exeligmos apart, so they all cast shadows over approximately the same parts of the Earth.

The longest duration of annularity was produced by member 34 at 5 minutes, 10 seconds on October 4, 1698, and the longest duration of totality will be produced by member 58 at 3 minutes, 43 seconds on June 25, 2131. All eclipses in this series occur at the Moon’s ascending node of orbit.

Series members 40–61 occur between 1801 and 2200:
40	41	42
December 10, 1806	December 20, 1824	December 31, 1842
43	44	45
January 11, 1861	January 22, 1879	February 1, 1897
46	47	48
February 14, 1915	February 24, 1933	March 7, 1951
49	50	51
March 18, 1969	March 29, 1987	April 8, 2005
52	53	54
April 20, 2023	April 30, 2041	May 11, 2059
55	56	57
May 22, 2077	June 2, 2095	June 13, 2113
58	59	60
June 25, 2131	July 5, 2149	July 16, 2167
61
July 26, 2185

=== Metonic series ===
The metonic series repeats eclipses every 19 years (6939.69 days), lasting about 5 cycles. Eclipses occur in nearly the same calendar date. In addition, the octon subseries repeats 1/5 of that or every 3.8 years (1387.94 days). All eclipses in this table occur at the Moon's ascending node.

21 eclipse events between July 23, 2036 and July 23, 2112
July 23–24	May 11	February 27–28	December 16–17	October 4–5
117	119	121	123	125
July 23, 2036	May 11, 2040	February 28, 2044	December 16, 2047	October 4, 2051
127	129	131	133	135
July 24, 2055	May 11, 2059	February 28, 2063	December 17, 2066	October 4, 2070
137	139	141	143	145
July 24, 2074	May 11, 2078	February 27, 2082	December 16, 2085	October 4, 2089
147	149	151	153	155
July 23, 2093	May 11, 2097	February 28, 2101	December 17, 2104	October 5, 2108
157
July 23, 2112

=== Tritos series ===
This eclipse is a part of a tritos cycle, repeating at alternating nodes every 135 synodic months (≈ 3986.63 days, or 11 years minus 1 month). Their appearance and longitude are irregular due to a lack of synchronization with the anomalistic month (period of perigee), but groupings of 3 tritos cycles (≈ 33 years minus 3 months) come close (≈ 434.044 anomalistic months), so eclipses are similar in these groupings.

Series members between 1801 and 2200
March 25, 1819 (Saros 107)	February 23, 1830 (Saros 108)	January 22, 1841 (Saros 109)		November 21, 1862 (Saros 111)
		August 20, 1895 (Saros 114)	July 21, 1906 (Saros 115)	June 19, 1917 (Saros 116)
May 19, 1928 (Saros 117)	April 19, 1939 (Saros 118)	March 18, 1950 (Saros 119)	February 15, 1961 (Saros 120)	January 16, 1972 (Saros 121)
December 15, 1982 (Saros 122)	November 13, 1993 (Saros 123)	October 14, 2004 (Saros 124)	September 13, 2015 (Saros 125)	August 12, 2026 (Saros 126)
July 13, 2037 (Saros 127)	June 11, 2048 (Saros 128)	May 11, 2059 (Saros 129)	April 11, 2070 (Saros 130)	March 10, 2081 (Saros 131)
February 7, 2092 (Saros 132)	January 8, 2103 (Saros 133)	December 8, 2113 (Saros 134)	November 6, 2124 (Saros 135)	October 7, 2135 (Saros 136)
September 6, 2146 (Saros 137)	August 5, 2157 (Saros 138)	July 5, 2168 (Saros 139)	June 5, 2179 (Saros 140)	May 4, 2190 (Saros 141)

=== Inex series ===
This eclipse is a part of the long period inex cycle, repeating at alternating nodes, every 358 synodic months (≈ 10,571.95 days, or 29 years minus 20 days). Their appearance and longitude are irregular due to a lack of synchronization with the anomalistic month (period of perigee). However, groupings of 3 inex cycles (≈ 87 years minus 2 months) comes close (≈ 1,151.02 anomalistic months), so eclipses are similar in these groupings.

Series members between 1801 and 2200
October 20, 1827 (Saros 121)	September 29, 1856 (Saros 122)	September 8, 1885 (Saros 123)
August 21, 1914 (Saros 124)	August 1, 1943 (Saros 125)	July 10, 1972 (Saros 126)
June 21, 2001 (Saros 127)	June 1, 2030 (Saros 128)	May 11, 2059 (Saros 129)
April 21, 2088 (Saros 130)	April 2, 2117 (Saros 131)	March 12, 2146 (Saros 132)
February 21, 2175 (Saros 133)		
