= April 1967 lunar eclipse =

Total lunar eclipse April 24, 1967

- Total eclipse
- A view of the eclipse as seen from the Moon, as observed by Surveyor 3.
- Date: April 24, 1967
- Gamma: 0.2972
- Magnitude: 1.3356
- Saros cycle: 121 (53 of 84)
- Totality: 77 minutes, 56 seconds
- Partiality: 202 minutes, 46 seconds
- Penumbral: 313 minutes, 18 seconds
Contacts (UTC)
- P1: 9:29:48
- U1: 10:25:03
- U2: 11:27:28
- Greatest: 12:06:26
- U3: 12:45:24
- U4: 13:47:49
- P4: 14:43:05

A total lunar eclipse occurred at the Moon’s descending node of orbit on Monday, April 24, 1967, with an umbral magnitude of 1.3356. A lunar eclipse occurs when the Moon moves into the Earth's shadow, causing the Moon to be darkened. A total lunar eclipse occurs when the Moon's near side entirely passes into the Earth's umbral shadow. Unlike a solar eclipse, which can only be viewed from a relatively small area of the world, a lunar eclipse may be viewed from anywhere on the night side of Earth. A total lunar eclipse can last up to nearly two hours, while a total solar eclipse lasts only a few minutes at any given place, because the Moon's shadow is smaller. Occurring only about 16 hours after perigee (on April 23, 1967, at 20:00 UTC), the Moon's apparent diameter was larger.

This lunar eclipse was the first of a tetrad, with four total lunar eclipses in series, the others being on October 18, 1967; April 13, 1968; and October 6, 1968.

The Surveyor 3 probe was active on the Moon during this eclipse.

== Visibility ==
The eclipse was completely visible over northeast Asia, Australia, and much of the Pacific Ocean, seen rising over most of Asia and setting over North America and western and central South America.

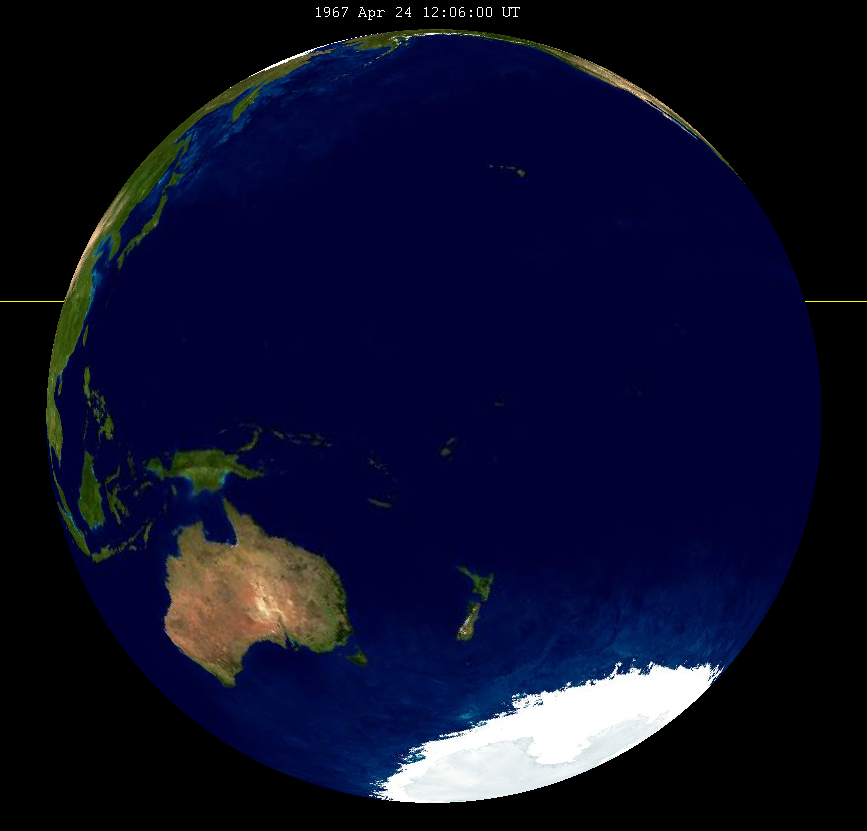
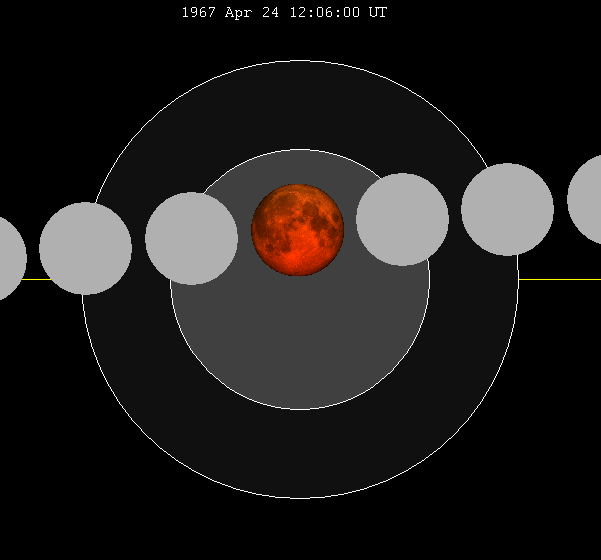

== Eclipse details ==
Shown below is a table displaying details about this particular solar eclipse. It describes various parameters pertaining to this eclipse.

April 24, 1967 Lunar Eclipse Parameters
Parameter	Value
Penumbral Magnitude	2.28924
Umbral Magnitude	1.33559
Gamma	0.29722
Sun Right Ascension	02h05m32.6s
Sun Declination	+12°43'38.7"
Sun Semi-Diameter	15'54.1"
Sun Equatorial Horizontal Parallax	08.7"
Moon Right Ascension	14h06m04.6s
Moon Declination	-12°27'13.7"
Moon Semi-Diameter	16'40.5"
Moon Equatorial Horizontal Parallax	1°01'11.8"
ΔT	37.7 s

== Eclipse season ==
This eclipse is part of an eclipse season, a period, roughly every six months, when eclipses occur. Only two (or occasionally three) eclipse seasons occur each year, and each season lasts about 35 days and repeats just short of six months (173 days) later; thus two full eclipse seasons always occur each year. Either two or three eclipses happen each eclipse season. In the sequence below, each eclipse is separated by a fortnight.

Eclipse season of April–May 1967
April 24 Descending node (full moon)	May 9 Ascending node (new moon)
Total lunar eclipse Lunar Saros 121	Partial solar eclipse Solar Saros 147

== Related eclipses ==
=== Eclipses in 1967 ===
- A total lunar eclipse on April 24.
- A partial solar eclipse on May 9.
- A total lunar eclipse on October 18.
- A non-central total solar eclipse on November 2.

=== Metonic ===
- Preceded by: Lunar eclipse of July 6, 1963
- Followed by: Lunar eclipse of February 10, 1971

=== Tzolkinex ===
- Preceded by: Lunar eclipse of March 13, 1960
- Followed by: Lunar eclipse of June 4, 1974

=== Half-Saros ===
- Preceded by: Solar eclipse of April 19, 1958
- Followed by: Solar eclipse of April 29, 1976

=== Tritos ===
- Preceded by: Lunar eclipse of May 24, 1956
- Followed by: Lunar eclipse of March 24, 1978

=== Lunar Saros 121 ===
- Preceded by: Lunar eclipse of April 13, 1949
- Followed by: Lunar eclipse of May 4, 1985

=== Inex ===
- Preceded by: Lunar eclipse of May 14, 1938
- Followed by: Lunar eclipse of April 4, 1996

=== Triad ===
- Preceded by: Lunar eclipse of June 22, 1880
- Followed by: Lunar eclipse of February 22, 2054

=== Lunar eclipses of 1966–1969 ===
This eclipse is a member of a semester series. An eclipse in a semester series of lunar eclipses repeats approximately every 177 days and 4 hours (a semester) at alternating nodes of the Moon's orbit.

The penumbral lunar eclipse on August 27, 1969 occurs in the next lunar year eclipse set.

Lunar eclipse series sets from 1966 to 1969
Descending node				Ascending node			
Saros	Date Viewing	Type Chart	Gamma	Saros	Date Viewing	Type Chart	Gamma
111	1966 May 04	Penumbral	1.0554	116	1966 Oct 29	Penumbral	−1.0600
121	1967 Apr 24	Total	0.2972	126	1967 Oct 18	Total	−0.3653
131	1968 Apr 13	Total	−0.4173	136	1968 Oct 06	Total	0.3605
141	1969 Apr 02	Penumbral	−1.1765	146	1969 Sep 25	Penumbral	1.0656

=== Metonic series ===
The Metonic cycle repeats nearly exactly every 19 years and represents a Saros cycle plus one lunar year. Because it occurs on the same calendar date, the Earth's shadow will in nearly the same location relative to the background stars.

Metonic lunar eclipse sets 1948–2005
Descending node			Ascending node		
Saros	Date	Type	Saros	Date	Type
111	1948 Apr 23	Partial	116	1948 Oct 18	Penumbral
121	1967 Apr 24	Total	126	1967 Oct 18	Total
131	1986 Apr 24	Total	136	1986 Oct 17	Total
141	2005 Apr 24	Penumbral	146	2005 Oct 17	Partial

=== Saros 121 ===
This eclipse is a part of Saros series 121, repeating every 18 years, 11 days, and containing 82 events. The series started with a penumbral lunar eclipse on October 6, 1047. It contains partial eclipses from May 10, 1408 through July 3, 1498; total eclipses from July 13, 1516 through May 26, 2021; and a second set of partial eclipses from June 6, 2039 through August 11, 2147. The series ends at member 82 as a penumbral eclipse on March 18, 2508.

The longest duration of totality was produced by member 43 at 100 minutes, 29 seconds on October 18, 1660. All eclipses in this series occur at the Moon’s descending node of orbit.

Greatest	First			
The greatest eclipse of the series occurred on 1660 Oct 18, lasting 100 minutes, 29 seconds.	Penumbral	Partial	Total	Central
The greatest eclipse of the series occurred on 1660 Oct 18, lasting 100 minutes, 29 seconds.	1047 Oct 06	1408 May 10	1516 Jul 13	1570 Aug 15
The greatest eclipse of the series occurred on 1660 Oct 18, lasting 100 minutes, 29 seconds.	Last			
The greatest eclipse of the series occurred on 1660 Oct 18, lasting 100 minutes, 29 seconds.	Central	Total	Partial	Penumbral
The greatest eclipse of the series occurred on 1660 Oct 18, lasting 100 minutes, 29 seconds.	1949 Apr 13	2021 May 26	2147 Aug 11	2508 Mar 18

Eclipses are tabulated in three columns; every third eclipse in the same column is one exeligmos apart, so they all cast shadows over approximately the same parts of the Earth.

Series members 43–64 occur between 1801 and 2200:
43	44	45
1805 Jan 15	1823 Jan 26	1841 Feb 06
46	47	48
1859 Feb 17	1877 Feb 27	1895 Mar 11
49	50	51
1913 Mar 22	1931 Apr 02	1949 Apr 13
52	53	54
1967 Apr 24	1985 May 04	2003 May 16
55	56	57
2021 May 26	2039 Jun 06	2057 Jun 17
58	59	60
2075 Jun 28	2093 Jul 08	2111 Jul 21
61	62	63
2129 Jul 31	2147 Aug 11	2165 Aug 21
64
2183 Sep 02

=== Tritos series ===
This eclipse is a part of a tritos cycle, repeating at alternating nodes every 135 synodic months (≈ 3986.63 days, or 11 years minus 1 month). Their appearance and longitude are irregular due to a lack of synchronization with the anomalistic month (period of perigee), but groupings of 3 tritos cycles (≈ 33 years minus 3 months) come close (≈ 434.044 anomalistic months), so eclipses are similar in these groupings.

Series members between 1801 and 2200
1803 Aug 03 (Saros 106)	1814 Jul 02 (Saros 107)	1825 Jun 01 (Saros 108)	1836 May 01 (Saros 109)	1847 Mar 31 (Saros 110)
1858 Feb 27 (Saros 111)	1869 Jan 28 (Saros 112)	1879 Dec 28 (Saros 113)	1890 Nov 26 (Saros 114)	1901 Oct 27 (Saros 115)
1912 Sep 26 (Saros 116)	1923 Aug 26 (Saros 117)	1934 Jul 26 (Saros 118)	1945 Jun 25 (Saros 119)	1956 May 24 (Saros 120)
1967 Apr 24 (Saros 121)	1978 Mar 24 (Saros 122)	1989 Feb 20 (Saros 123)	2000 Jan 21 (Saros 124)	2010 Dec 21 (Saros 125)
2021 Nov 19 (Saros 126)	2032 Oct 18 (Saros 127)	2043 Sep 19 (Saros 128)	2054 Aug 18 (Saros 129)	2065 Jul 17 (Saros 130)
2076 Jun 17 (Saros 131)	2087 May 17 (Saros 132)	2098 Apr 15 (Saros 133)	2109 Mar 17 (Saros 134)	2120 Feb 14 (Saros 135)
2131 Jan 13 (Saros 136)	2141 Dec 13 (Saros 137)	2152 Nov 12 (Saros 138)	2163 Oct 12 (Saros 139)	2174 Sep 11 (Saros 140)
2185 Aug 11 (Saros 141)	2196 Jul 10 (Saros 142)			

=== Inex series ===
This eclipse is a part of the long period inex cycle, repeating at alternating nodes, every 358 synodic months (≈ 10,571.95 days, or 29 years minus 20 days). Their appearance and longitude are irregular due to a lack of synchronization with the anomalistic month (period of perigee). However, groupings of 3 inex cycles (≈ 87 years minus 2 months) comes close (≈ 1,151.02 anomalistic months), so eclipses are similar in these groupings.

Series members between 1801 and 2200
1822 Aug 03 (Saros 116)	1851 Jul 13 (Saros 117)	1880 Jun 22 (Saros 118)
1909 Jun 04 (Saros 119)	1938 May 14 (Saros 120)	1967 Apr 24 (Saros 121)
1996 Apr 04 (Saros 122)	2025 Mar 14 (Saros 123)	2054 Feb 22 (Saros 124)
2083 Feb 02 (Saros 125)	2112 Jan 14 (Saros 126)	2140 Dec 23 (Saros 127)
2169 Dec 04 (Saros 128)	2198 Nov 13 (Saros 129)	

=== Half-Saros cycle ===
A lunar eclipse will be preceded and followed by solar eclipses by 9 years and 5.5 days (a half saros). This lunar eclipse is related to two annular solar eclipses of Solar Saros 128.

April 19, 1958	April 29, 1976

== See also ==
- List of lunar eclipses
- List of 20th-century lunar eclipses
