= Solar Saros 129 =

Saros cycle series 129 for solar eclipses

Animated path of entire Saros.

Saros cycle series 129 for solar eclipses occurs at the Moon's ascending node, repeating every 18 years, 11 days, containing 80 eclipses, 41 of which are umbral (29 annular, 3 hybrid, 9 total). The first eclipse in the series was on 3 October 1103 and the last will be on 21 February 2528. The most recent eclipse was a hybrid eclipse on 20 April 2023 and the next will be a total eclipse on 30 April 2041.

The longest totality will be 3 minutes 43 seconds on 25 June 2131, and the longest annular was 5 minutes 10 seconds on 4 October 1698.

This solar saros is linked to Lunar Saros 122.

== Umbral eclipses ==
Umbral eclipses (annular, total and hybrid) can be further classified as either: 1) Central (two limits), 2) Central (one limit) or 3) Non-Central (one limit). The statistical distribution of these classes in Saros series 129 appears in the following table.

Classification	Number	Percent
All Umbral eclipses	41	100.00%
Central (two limits)	40	97.56%
Central (one limit)	1	2.44%
Non-central (one limit)	0	0.00%

== All eclipses ==
Note: Dates are given in the Julian calendar prior to 15 October 1582, and in the Gregorian calendar after that.

Saros	Member	Date	Time (Greatest) UTC	Type	Location Lat, Long	Gamma	Mag.	Width (km)	Duration (min:sec)	Ref
129	1	October 3, 1103	3:17:50	Partial	71.7N 157.1W	1.5318	0.0556			
129	2	October 13, 1121	10:56:27	Partial	71.2N 74.2E	1.506	0.1012			
129	3	October 24, 1139	18:42:07	Partial	70.6N 55.8W	1.4859	0.1369			
129	4	November 4, 1157	2:33:58	Partial	69.7N 173.3E	1.471	0.1634			
129	5	November 15, 1175	10:31:20	Partial	68.7N 41.6E	1.4605	0.1821			
129	6	November 25, 1193	18:32:28	Partial	67.7N 90.3W	1.4531	0.1954			
129	7	December 7, 1211	2:36:45	Partial	66.6N 137.5E	1.4484	0.2039			
129	8	December 17, 1229	10:40:21	Partial	65.5N 6.1E	1.4431	0.2132			
129	9	December 28, 1247	18:44:27	Partial	64.5N 125.1W	1.4383	0.2213			
129	10	January 8, 1266	2:44:29	Partial	63.6N 105.2E	1.4301	0.235			
129	11	January 19, 1284	10:41:02	Partial	62.8N 23.3W	1.4194	0.2525			
129	12	January 29, 1302	18:29:48	Partial	62.1N 149.7W	1.4025	0.2805			
129	13	February 10, 1320	2:13:16	Partial	61.5N 85.4E	1.3813	0.3154			
129	14	February 20, 1338	9:47:30	Partial	61.2N 37W	1.3524	0.3632			
129	15	March 2, 1356	17:13:18	Partial	60.9N 157.2W	1.3168	0.4225			
129	16	March 14, 1374	0:29:08	Partial	60.9N 85.1E	1.2731	0.4957			
129	17	March 24, 1392	7:36:47	Partial	60.9N 30.5W	1.2226	0.5809			
129	18	April 4, 1410	14:35:19	Partial	61.2N 143.9W	1.1642	0.6799			
129	19	April 14, 1428	21:25:47	Partial	61.6N 104.6E	1.0987	0.7916			
129	20	April 26, 1446	4:09:04	Partial	62.1N 5.2W	1.0268	0.9147			
129	21	May 6, 1464	10:46:58	Annular	71.2N 72.8W	0.9502	0.9367	771	4m 17s	
129	22	May 17, 1482	17:19:00	Annular	73.4N 137W	0.8681	0.942	434	4m 14s	
129	23	May 27, 1500	23:48:31	Annular	71.5N 152.4E	0.7832	0.9461	320	4m 13s	
129	24	June 8, 1518	6:15:24	Annular	67N 73.4E	0.6955	0.9496	259	4m 13s	
129	25	June 18, 1536	12:43:21	Annular	61N 13.4W	0.6079	0.9523	220	4m 17s	
129	26	June 29, 1554	19:10:40	Annular	54N 104.8W	0.5192	0.9546	195	4m 22s	
129	27	July 10, 1572	1:42:42	Annular	46.6N 159.7E	0.4338	0.9562	177	4m 30s	
129	28	July 31, 1590	8:17:39	Annular	38.8N 61.6E	0.3503	0.9574	166	4m 38s	
129	29	August 10, 1608	15:00:06	Annular	31N 39.6W	0.2722	0.9581	158	4m 46s	
129	30	August 21, 1626	21:47:42	Annular	23.1N 142.9W	0.1975	0.9584	154	4m 54s	
129	31	September 1, 1644	4:45:28	Annular	15.4N 110.9E	0.1307	0.9584	152	5m 0s	
129	32	September 12, 1662	11:50:45	Annular	7.9N 2.6E	0.0694	0.9581	153	5m 5s	
129	33	September 22, 1680	19:06:23	Annular	0.7N 108.2W	0.016	0.9578	153	5m 8s	
129	34	October 4, 1698	2:31:25	Annular	6.2S 138.8E	-0.0305	0.9573	155	5m 10s	
129	35	October 15, 1716	10:07:39	Annular	12.5S 23.5E	-0.0687	0.957	157	5m 10s	
129	36	October 26, 1734	17:53:28	Annular	18.2S 93.8W	-0.0996	0.9567	159	5m 8s	
129	37	November 6, 1752	1:48:14	Annular	23.2S 147.4E	-0.1239	0.9567	159	5m 3s	
129	38	November 17, 1770	9:51:53	Annular	27.3S 27.1E	-0.1416	0.9571	158	4m 56s	
129	39	November 27, 1788	18:02:54	Annular	30.4S 94.3W	-0.1542	0.9579	155	4m 46s	
129	40	December 10, 1806	2:19:40	Annular	32.4S 143.4E	-0.1627	0.9591	151	4m 32s	
129	41	December 20, 1824	10:40:36	Annular	33.3S 20.4E	-0.1685	0.961	144	4m 15s	
129	42	December 31, 1842	19:04:24	Annular	33.1S 103.2W	-0.1727	0.9634	135	3m 54s	
129	43	January 11, 1861	3:29:23	Annular	31.8S 132.7E	-0.1766	0.9664	123	3m 30s	
129	44	January 22, 1879	11:53:08	Annular	29.8S 8.5E	-0.1824	0.97	110	3m 3s	
129	45	February 1, 1897	20:15:15	Annular	27.1S 115.7W	-0.1903	0.9742	94	2m 34s	
129	46	February 14, 1915	4:33:20	Annular	24S 120.7E	-0.2024	0.9789	77	2m 4s	
129	47	February 24, 1933	12:46:39	Annular	20.8S 2.1W	-0.2191	0.9841	58	1m 32s	
129	48	March 7, 1951	20:53:40	Annular	17.7S 123.5W	-0.242	0.9896	38	0m 59s	
129	49	March 18, 1969	4:54:57	Annular	14.8S 116.3E	-0.2704	0.9954	16	0m 26s	
129	50	March 29, 1987	12:49:47	Hybrid	12.3S 2.3W	-0.30531	1.00134	4.9	0m 7.57s	
129	51	April 8, 2005	20:36:51	Hybrid	10.6S 119W	-0.3473	1.0074	27	0m 42s	
129	52	April 20, 2023	4:17:56	Hybrid	9.6S 125.8E	-0.3952	1.0132	49	1m 16s	
129	53	April 30, 2041	11:52:21	Total	9.6S 12.2E	-0.4492	1.0189	72	1m 51s	
129	54	May 11, 2059	19:22:16	Total	10.7S 100.4W	-0.508	1.0242	95	2m 23s	
129	55	May 22, 2077	2:46:05	Total	13.1S 148.3E	-0.5725	1.029	119	2m 54s	
129	56	June 2, 2095	10:07:40	Total	16.7S 37.2E	-0.6396	1.0332	145	3m 18s	
129	57	June 13, 2113	17:26:00	Total	21.7S 73.8W	-0.7097	1.0367	174	3m 36s	
129	58	June 25, 2131	0:43:16	Total	28.1S 174.7E	-0.7813	1.0393	211	3m 43s	
129	59	July 5, 2149	7:59:34	Total	36.3S 62.4E	-0.8544	1.0408	264	3m 38s	
129	60	July 16, 2167	15:17:48	Total	46.8S 52.4W	-0.9262	1.041	368	3m 19s	
129	61	July 26, 2185	22:38:16	Total (Note: No southern limit)	67.9S 178.5W	-0.9967	1.037	-	2m 27s	
129	62	August 8, 2203	6:01:56	Partial	70.1S 57E	-1.065	0.8898			
129	63	August 18, 2221	13:30:39	Partial	70.9S 67.8W	-1.1295	0.7673			
129	64	August 29, 2239	21:05:15	Partial	71.5S 165.5E	-1.1897	0.6529			
129	65	September 9, 2257	4:46:44	Partial	71.9S 36.6E	-1.2448	0.548			
129	66	September 20, 2275	12:34:54	Partial	72S 94.3W	-1.2949	0.4527			
129	67	September 30, 2293	20:31:27	Partial	72S 132.7E	-1.3386	0.3697			
129	68	October 13, 2311	4:36:09	Partial	71.6S 2.1W	-1.3762	0.2985			
129	69	October 23, 2329	12:48:23	Partial	71.1S 138.5W	-1.4082	0.2383			
129	70	November 3, 2347	21:09:19	Partial	70.4S 83.4E	-1.4337	0.1903			
129	71	November 14, 2365	5:37:33	Partial	69.5S 55.9W	-1.454	0.1526			
129	72	November 25, 2383	14:13:32	Partial	68.6S 163.5E	-1.4683	0.126			
129	73	December 5, 2401	22:53:37	Partial	67.5S 22.4E	-1.4797	0.1049			
129	74	December 17, 2419	7:40:07	Partial	66.5S 119.7W	-1.4865	0.0925			
129	75	December 27, 2437	16:29:07	Partial	65.5S 98.1E	-1.492	0.0824			
129	76	January 8, 2456	1:21:04	Partial	64.5S 44.5W	-1.4954	0.076			
129	77	January 18, 2474	10:12:11	Partial	63.6S 173.5E	-1.5	0.0673			
129	78	January 29, 2492	19:03:43	Partial	62.9S 31.6E	-1.5046	0.0582			
129	79	February 10, 2510	3:51:56	Partial	62.2S 109.1W	-1.5123	0.043			
129	80	February 21, 2528	12:36:45	Partial	61.8S 111.1E	-1.5232	0.0218			
