= October 2050 lunar eclipse =

Astronomical event

- Total eclipse
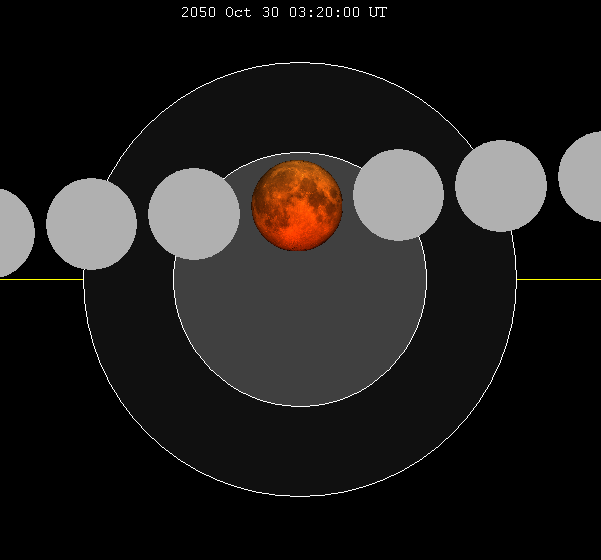
- The Moon's hourly motion shown right to left
- Date: October 30, 2050
- Gamma: 0.4435
- Magnitude: 1.0549
- Saros cycle: 127 (44 of 72)
- Totality: 34 minutes, 30 seconds
- Partiality: 192 minutes, 51 seconds
- Penumbral: 313 minutes, 8 seconds
Contacts (UTC)
- P1: 0:43:40
- U1: 1:43:45
- U2: 3:02:56
- Greatest: 3:20:12
- U3: 3:37:26
- U4: 4:56:37
- P4: 5:56:48

A total lunar eclipse will occur at the Moon’s descending node of orbit on Sunday, October 30, 2050, with an umbral magnitude of 1.0549. A lunar eclipse occurs when the Moon moves into the Earth's shadow, causing the Moon to be darkened. A total lunar eclipse occurs when the Moon's near side entirely passes into the Earth's umbral shadow. Unlike a solar eclipse, which can only be viewed from a relatively small area of the world, a lunar eclipse may be viewed from anywhere on the night side of Earth. A total lunar eclipse can last up to nearly two hours, while a total solar eclipse lasts only a few minutes at any given place, because the Moon's shadow is smaller. Occurring about 1.9 days after perigee (on October 28, 2050, at 5:10 UTC), the Moon's apparent diameter will be larger.

This lunar eclipse is the second of a tetrad, with four total lunar eclipses in series, the others being on May 6, 2050; April 26, 2051; and October 19, 2051.

During the eclipse, NGC 877 will be occulted by the Moon over the southeast Pacific Ocean, South America and the Atlantic Ocean. Deep-sky objects are rarely occulted during a total eclipse from any given spot on Earth.

== Visibility ==
The eclipse will be completely visible over North and South America, west Africa, and western Europe, seen rising over the central and eastern Pacific Ocean and setting over central and east Africa, eastern Europe, and west, central, and south Asia.

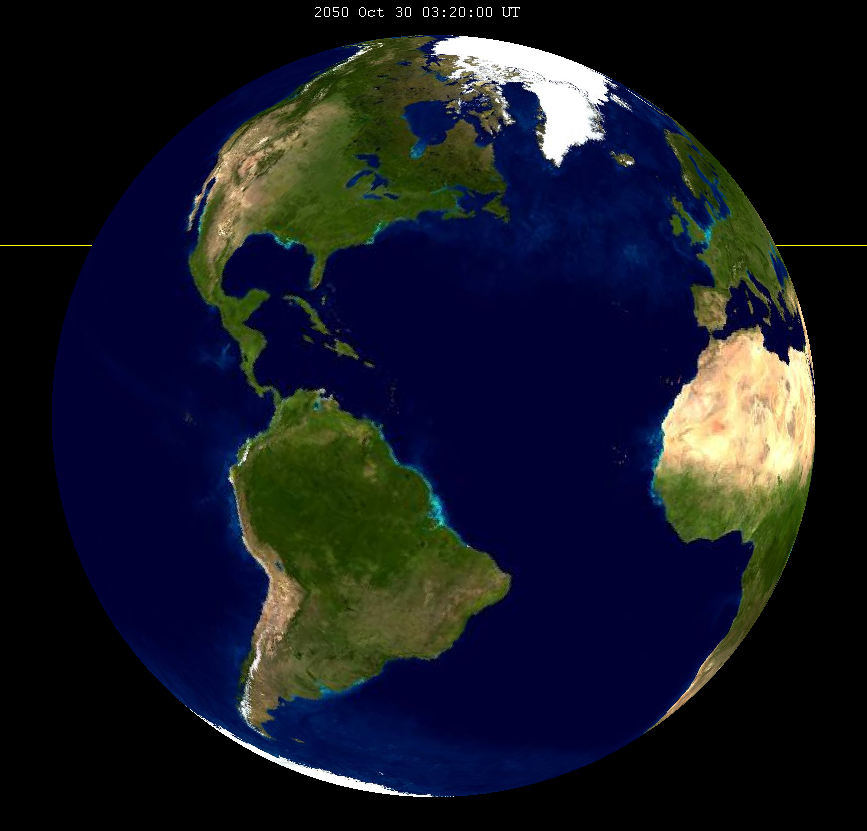
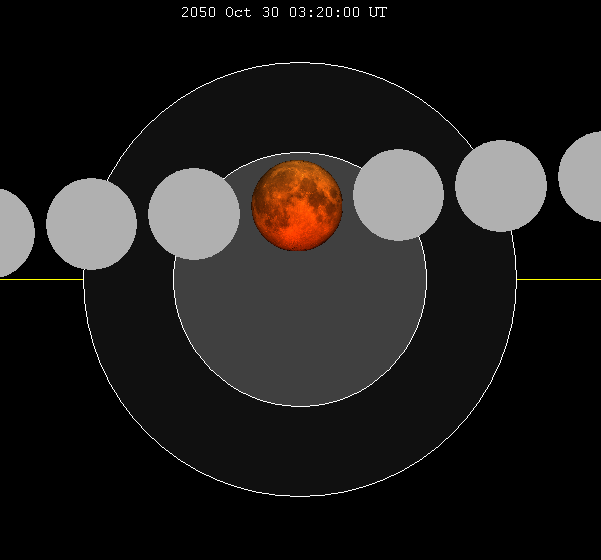

== Eclipse details ==
Shown below is a table displaying details about this particular solar eclipse. It describes various parameters pertaining to this eclipse.

October 30, 2050 Lunar Eclipse Parameters
Parameter	Value
Penumbral Magnitude	2.03564
Umbral Magnitude	1.05490
Gamma	0.44351
Sun Right Ascension	14h18m15.4s
Sun Declination	-13°48'46.9"
Sun Semi-Diameter	16'06.2"
Sun Equatorial Horizontal Parallax	08.9"
Moon Right Ascension	02h17m49.7s
Moon Declination	+14°14'46.2"
Moon Semi-Diameter	16'25.2"
Moon Equatorial Horizontal Parallax	1°00'15.6"
ΔT	85.6 s

== Eclipse season ==
This eclipse is part of an eclipse season, a period, roughly every six months, when eclipses occur. Only two (or occasionally three) eclipse seasons occur each year, and each season lasts about 35 days and repeats just short of six months (173 days) later; thus two full eclipse seasons always occur each year. Either two or three eclipses happen each eclipse season. In the sequence below, each eclipse is separated by a fortnight.

Eclipse season of October–November 2050
October 30 Descending node (full moon)	November 14 Ascending node (new moon)
Total lunar eclipse Lunar Saros 127	Partial solar eclipse Solar Saros 153

== Related eclipses ==
=== Eclipses in 2050 ===
- A total lunar eclipse on May 6.
- A hybrid solar eclipse on May 20.
- A total lunar eclipse on October 30.
- A partial solar eclipse on November 14.

=== Metonic ===
- Preceded by: Lunar eclipse of January 12, 2047
- Followed by: Lunar eclipse of August 18, 2054

=== Tzolkinex ===
- Preceded by: Lunar eclipse of September 19, 2043
- Followed by: Lunar eclipse of December 11, 2057

=== Half-Saros ===
- Preceded by: Solar eclipse of October 25, 2041
- Followed by: Solar eclipse of November 5, 2059

=== Tritos ===
- Preceded by: Lunar eclipse of November 30, 2039
- Followed by: Lunar eclipse of September 29, 2061

=== Lunar Saros 127 ===
- Preceded by: Lunar eclipse of October 18, 2032
- Followed by: Lunar eclipse of November 9, 2068

=== Inex ===
- Preceded by: Lunar eclipse of November 19, 2021
- Followed by: Lunar eclipse of October 10, 2079

=== Triad ===
- Preceded by: Lunar eclipse of December 30, 1963
- Followed by: Lunar eclipse of August 30, 2137

=== Lunar eclipses of 2049–2052 ===
This eclipse is a member of a semester series. An eclipse in a semester series of lunar eclipses repeats approximately every 177 days and 4 hours (a semester) at alternating nodes of the Moon's orbit.

The penumbral lunar eclipse on June 15, 2049 occurs in the previous lunar year eclipse set.

Lunar eclipse series sets from 2049 to 2052
Ascending node				Descending node			
Saros	Date Viewing	Type Chart	Gamma	Saros	Date Viewing	Type Chart	Gamma
112	2049 May 17	Penumbral	−1.1337	117	2049 Nov 09	Penumbral	1.1964
122	2050 May 06	Total	−0.4181	127	2050 Oct 30	Total	0.4435
132	2051 Apr 26	Total	0.3371	137	2051 Oct 19	Total	−0.2542
142	2052 Apr 14	Penumbral	1.0628	147	2052 Oct 08	Partial	−0.9726

=== Saros 127 ===
This eclipse is a part of Saros series 127, repeating every 18 years, 11 days, and containing 72 events. The series started with a penumbral lunar eclipse on July 9, 1275. It contains partial eclipses from November 4, 1473 through May 18, 1780; total eclipses from May 29, 1798 through November 9, 2068; and a second set of partial eclipses from November 20, 2086 through June 17, 2429. The series ends at member 72 as a penumbral eclipse on September 2, 2555.

The longest duration of totality was produced by member 35 at 101 minutes, 46 seconds on July 23, 1888. All eclipses in this series occur at the Moon’s descending node of orbit.

Greatest	First			
The greatest eclipse of the series occurred on 1888 Jul 23, lasting 101 minutes, 46 seconds.	Penumbral	Partial	Total	Central
The greatest eclipse of the series occurred on 1888 Jul 23, lasting 101 minutes, 46 seconds.	1275 Jul 09	1473 Nov 04	1798 May 29	1834 Jun 21
The greatest eclipse of the series occurred on 1888 Jul 23, lasting 101 minutes, 46 seconds.	Last			
The greatest eclipse of the series occurred on 1888 Jul 23, lasting 101 minutes, 46 seconds.	Central	Total	Partial	Penumbral
The greatest eclipse of the series occurred on 1888 Jul 23, lasting 101 minutes, 46 seconds.	1960 Sep 05	2068 Nov 09	2429 Jun 17	2555 Sep 02

Eclipses are tabulated in three columns; every third eclipse in the same column is one exeligmos apart, so they all cast shadows over approximately the same parts of the Earth.

Series members 31–52 occur between 1801 and 2200:
31	32	33
1816 Jun 10	1834 Jun 21	1852 Jul 01
34	35	36
1870 Jul 12	1888 Jul 23	1906 Aug 04
37	38	39
1924 Aug 14	1942 Aug 26	1960 Sep 05
40	41	42
1978 Sep 16	1996 Sep 27	2014 Oct 08
43	44	45
2032 Oct 18	2050 Oct 30	2068 Nov 09
46	47	48
2086 Nov 20	2104 Dec 02	2122 Dec 13
49	50	51
2140 Dec 23	2159 Jan 04	2177 Jan 14
52
2195 Jan 26

=== Tritos series ===
This eclipse is a part of a tritos cycle, repeating at alternating nodes every 135 synodic months (≈ 3986.63 days, or 11 years minus 1 month). Their appearance and longitude are irregular due to a lack of synchronization with the anomalistic month (period of perigee), but groupings of 3 tritos cycles (≈ 33 years minus 3 months) come close (≈ 434.044 anomalistic months), so eclipses are similar in these groupings.

Series members between 1801 and 2200
1810 Sep 13 (Saros 105)	1821 Aug 13 (Saros 106)	1832 Jul 12 (Saros 107)	1843 Jun 12 (Saros 108)	1854 May 12 (Saros 109)
1865 Apr 11 (Saros 110)	1876 Mar 10 (Saros 111)	1887 Feb 08 (Saros 112)	1898 Jan 08 (Saros 113)	1908 Dec 07 (Saros 114)
1919 Nov 07 (Saros 115)	1930 Oct 07 (Saros 116)	1941 Sep 05 (Saros 117)	1952 Aug 05 (Saros 118)	1963 Jul 06 (Saros 119)
1974 Jun 04 (Saros 120)	1985 May 04 (Saros 121)	1996 Apr 04 (Saros 122)	2007 Mar 03 (Saros 123)	2018 Jan 31 (Saros 124)
2028 Dec 31 (Saros 125)	2039 Nov 30 (Saros 126)	2050 Oct 30 (Saros 127)	2061 Sep 29 (Saros 128)	2072 Aug 28 (Saros 129)
2083 Jul 29 (Saros 130)	2094 Jun 28 (Saros 131)	2105 May 28 (Saros 132)	2116 Apr 27 (Saros 133)	2127 Mar 28 (Saros 134)
2138 Feb 24 (Saros 135)	2149 Jan 23 (Saros 136)	2159 Dec 24 (Saros 137)	2170 Nov 23 (Saros 138)	2181 Oct 22 (Saros 139)
2192 Sep 21 (Saros 140)

=== Inex series ===
This eclipse is a part of the long period inex cycle, repeating at alternating nodes, every 358 synodic months (≈ 10,571.95 days, or 29 years minus 20 days). Their appearance and longitude are irregular due to a lack of synchronization with the anomalistic month (period of perigee). However, groupings of 3 inex cycles (≈ 87 years minus 2 months) comes close (≈ 1,151.02 anomalistic months), so eclipses are similar in these groupings.

Series members between 1801 and 2200
1819 Apr 10 (Saros 119)	1848 Mar 19 (Saros 120)	1877 Feb 27 (Saros 121)
1906 Feb 09 (Saros 122)	1935 Jan 19 (Saros 123)	1963 Dec 30 (Saros 124)
1992 Dec 09 (Saros 125)	2021 Nov 19 (Saros 126)	2050 Oct 30 (Saros 127)
2079 Oct 10 (Saros 128)	2108 Sep 20 (Saros 129)	2137 Aug 30 (Saros 130)
2166 Aug 11 (Saros 131)	2195 Jul 22 (Saros 132)	

=== Half-Saros cycle ===
A lunar eclipse will be preceded and followed by solar eclipses by 9 years and 5.5 days (a half saros). This lunar eclipse is related to two annular solar eclipses of Solar Saros 134.

October 25, 2041	November 5, 2059

== See also ==
- List of lunar eclipses and List of 21st-century lunar eclipses
