= September 1978 lunar eclipse =

Total lunar eclipse September 16, 1978

- Total eclipse
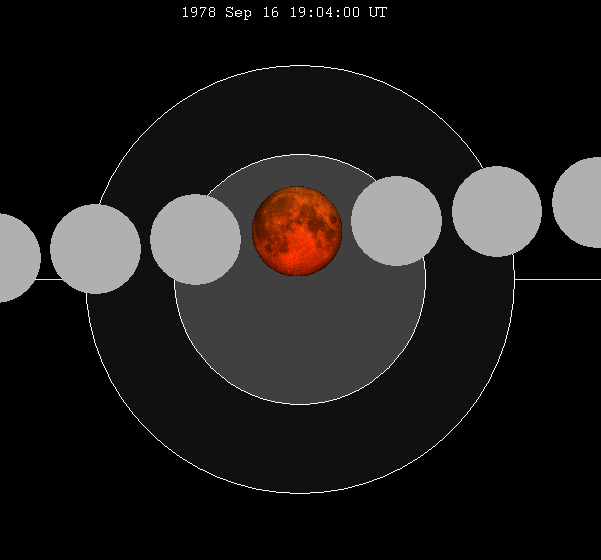
- The Moon's hourly motion shown right to left
- Date: September 16, 1978
- Gamma: 0.2951
- Magnitude: 1.3268
- Saros cycle: 127 (40 of 72)
- Totality: 78 minutes, 39 seconds
- Partiality: 207 minutes, 10 seconds
- Penumbral: 323 minutes, 50 seconds
Contacts (UTC)
- P1: 16:22:19
- U1: 17:20:36
- U2: 18:24:52
- Greatest: 19:04:12
- U3: 19:43:30
- U4: 20:47:46
- P4: 21:46:10

A total lunar eclipse occurred at the Moon’s descending node of orbit on Saturday, September 16, 1978, with an umbral magnitude of 1.3268. A lunar eclipse occurs when the Moon moves into the Earth's shadow, causing the Moon to be darkened. A total lunar eclipse occurs when the Moon's near side entirely passes into the Earth's umbral shadow. Unlike a solar eclipse, which can only be viewed from a relatively small area of the world, a lunar eclipse may be viewed from anywhere on the night side of Earth. A total lunar eclipse can last up to nearly two hours, while a total solar eclipse lasts only a few minutes at any given place, because the Moon's shadow is smaller. Occurring about 2.4 days after perigee (on September 14, 1978, at 10:35 UTC), the Moon's apparent diameter was larger.

== Visibility ==
The eclipse was completely visible over east Africa, eastern Europe, much of Asia, and western Australia, seen rising over eastern South America, western Europe, and west and central Africa and setting over northeast Asia and central and eastern Australia.

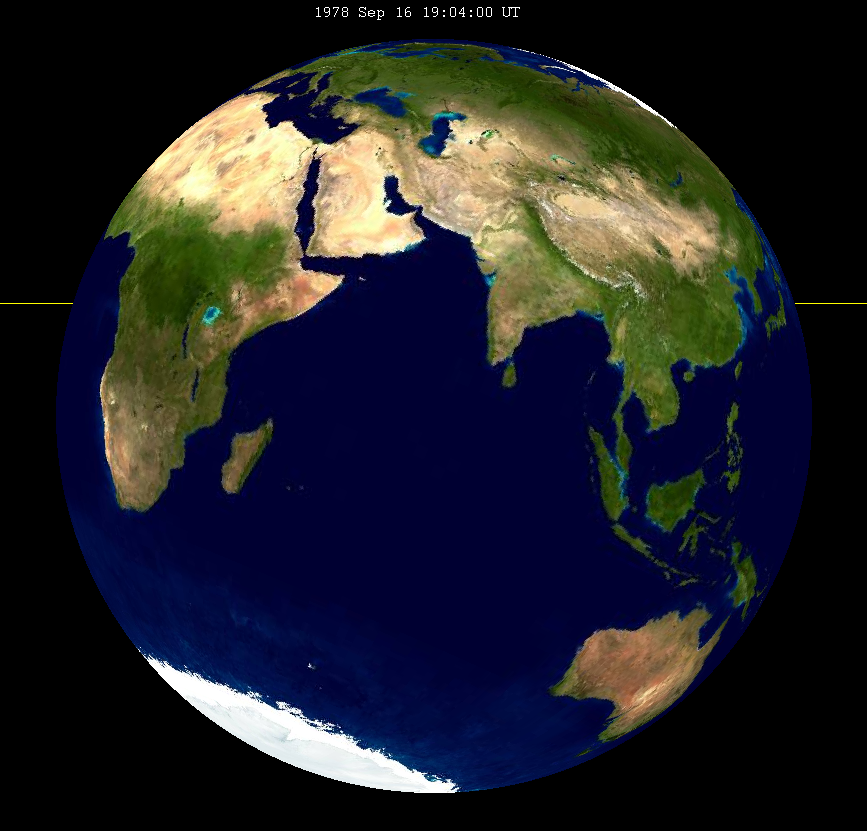
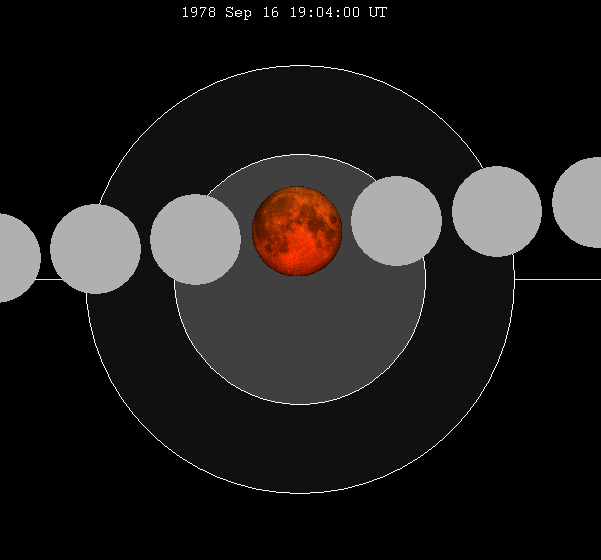

== Eclipse details ==
Shown below is a table displaying details about this particular solar eclipse. It describes various parameters pertaining to this eclipse.

September 16, 1978 Lunar Eclipse Parameters
Parameter	Value
Penumbral Magnitude	2.30598
Umbral Magnitude	1.32683
Gamma	0.29510
Sun Right Ascension	11h36m19.9s
Sun Declination	+02°33'33.2"
Sun Semi-Diameter	15'54.7"
Sun Equatorial Horizontal Parallax	08.7"
Moon Right Ascension	23h35m58.5s
Moon Declination	-02°16'47.0"
Moon Semi-Diameter	16'15.0"
Moon Equatorial Horizontal Parallax	0°59'38.4"
ΔT	49.3 s

== Eclipse season ==
This eclipse is part of an eclipse season, a period, roughly every six months, when eclipses occur. Only two (or occasionally three) eclipse seasons occur each year, and each season lasts about 35 days and repeats just short of six months (173 days) later; thus two full eclipse seasons always occur each year. Either two or three eclipses happen each eclipse season. In the sequence below, each eclipse is separated by a fortnight.

Eclipse season of September–October 1978
September 16 Descending node (full moon)	October 2 Ascending node (new moon)
Total lunar eclipse Lunar Saros 127	Partial solar eclipse Solar Saros 153

== Related eclipses ==
=== Eclipses in 1978 ===
- A total lunar eclipse on March 24.
- A partial solar eclipse on April 7.
- A total lunar eclipse on September 16.
- A partial solar eclipse on October 2.

=== Metonic ===
- Preceded by: Lunar eclipse of November 29, 1974
- Followed by: Lunar eclipse of July 6, 1982

=== Tzolkinex ===
- Preceded by: Lunar eclipse of August 6, 1971
- Followed by: Lunar eclipse of October 28, 1985

=== Half-Saros ===
- Preceded by: Solar eclipse of September 11, 1969
- Followed by: Solar eclipse of September 23, 1987

=== Tritos ===
- Preceded by: Lunar eclipse of October 18, 1967
- Followed by: Lunar eclipse of August 17, 1989

=== Lunar Saros 127 ===
- Preceded by: Lunar eclipse of September 5, 1960
- Followed by: Lunar eclipse of September 27, 1996

=== Inex ===
- Preceded by: Lunar eclipse of October 7, 1949
- Followed by: Lunar eclipse of August 28, 2007

=== Triad ===
- Preceded by: Lunar eclipse of November 16, 1891
- Followed by: Lunar eclipse of July 17, 2065

=== Lunar eclipses of 1977–1980 ===
This eclipse is a member of a semester series. An eclipse in a semester series of lunar eclipses repeats approximately every 177 days and 4 hours (a semester) at alternating nodes of the Moon's orbit.

The penumbral lunar eclipse on July 27, 1980 occurs in the next lunar year eclipse set.

Lunar eclipse series sets from 1977 to 1980
Ascending node				Descending node			
Saros	Date Viewing	Type Chart	Gamma	Saros	Date Viewing	Type Chart	Gamma
112	1977 Apr 04	Partial	−0.9148	117	1977 Sep 27	Penumbral	1.0768
122	1978 Mar 24	Total	−0.2140	127	1978 Sep 16	Total	0.2951
132	1979 Mar 13	Partial	0.5254	137	1979 Sep 06	Total	−0.4305
142	1980 Mar 01	Penumbral	1.2270	147	1980 Aug 26	Penumbral	−1.1608

=== Saros 127 ===
This eclipse is a part of Saros series 127, repeating every 18 years, 11 days, and containing 72 events. The series started with a penumbral lunar eclipse on July 9, 1275. It contains partial eclipses from November 4, 1473 through May 18, 1780; total eclipses from May 29, 1798 through November 9, 2068; and a second set of partial eclipses from November 20, 2086 through June 17, 2429. The series ends at member 72 as a penumbral eclipse on September 2, 2555.

The longest duration of totality was produced by member 35 at 101 minutes, 46 seconds on July 23, 1888. All eclipses in this series occur at the Moon’s descending node of orbit.

Greatest	First			
The greatest eclipse of the series occurred on 1888 Jul 23, lasting 101 minutes, 46 seconds.	Penumbral	Partial	Total	Central
The greatest eclipse of the series occurred on 1888 Jul 23, lasting 101 minutes, 46 seconds.	1275 Jul 09	1473 Nov 04	1798 May 29	1834 Jun 21
The greatest eclipse of the series occurred on 1888 Jul 23, lasting 101 minutes, 46 seconds.	Last			
The greatest eclipse of the series occurred on 1888 Jul 23, lasting 101 minutes, 46 seconds.	Central	Total	Partial	Penumbral
The greatest eclipse of the series occurred on 1888 Jul 23, lasting 101 minutes, 46 seconds.	1960 Sep 05	2068 Nov 09	2429 Jun 17	2555 Sep 02

Eclipses are tabulated in three columns; every third eclipse in the same column is one exeligmos apart, so they all cast shadows over approximately the same parts of the Earth.

Series members 31–52 occur between 1801 and 2200:
31	32	33
1816 Jun 10	1834 Jun 21	1852 Jul 01
34	35	36
1870 Jul 12	1888 Jul 23	1906 Aug 04
37	38	39
1924 Aug 14	1942 Aug 26	1960 Sep 05
40	41	42
1978 Sep 16	1996 Sep 27	2014 Oct 08
43	44	45
2032 Oct 18	2050 Oct 30	2068 Nov 09
46	47	48
2086 Nov 20	2104 Dec 02	2122 Dec 13
49	50	51
2140 Dec 23	2159 Jan 04	2177 Jan 14
52
2195 Jan 26

=== Tritos series ===
This eclipse is a part of a tritos cycle, repeating at alternating nodes every 135 synodic months (≈ 3986.63 days, or 11 years minus 1 month). Their appearance and longitude are irregular due to a lack of synchronization with the anomalistic month (period of perigee), but groupings of 3 tritos cycles (≈ 33 years minus 3 months) come close (≈ 434.044 anomalistic months), so eclipses are similar in these groupings.

Series members between 1801 and 2200
1804 Jan 26 (Saros 111)	1814 Dec 26 (Saros 112)	1825 Nov 25 (Saros 113)	1836 Oct 24 (Saros 114)	1847 Sep 24 (Saros 115)
1858 Aug 24 (Saros 116)	1869 Jul 23 (Saros 117)	1880 Jun 22 (Saros 118)	1891 May 23 (Saros 119)	1902 Apr 22 (Saros 120)
1913 Mar 22 (Saros 121)	1924 Feb 20 (Saros 122)	1935 Jan 19 (Saros 123)	1945 Dec 19 (Saros 124)	1956 Nov 18 (Saros 125)
1967 Oct 18 (Saros 126)	1978 Sep 16 (Saros 127)	1989 Aug 17 (Saros 128)	2000 Jul 16 (Saros 129)	2011 Jun 15 (Saros 130)
2022 May 16 (Saros 131)	2033 Apr 14 (Saros 132)	2044 Mar 13 (Saros 133)	2055 Feb 11 (Saros 134)	2066 Jan 11 (Saros 135)
2076 Dec 10 (Saros 136)	2087 Nov 10 (Saros 137)	2098 Oct 10 (Saros 138)	2109 Sep 09 (Saros 139)	2120 Aug 09 (Saros 140)
2131 Jul 10 (Saros 141)	2142 Jun 08 (Saros 142)	2153 May 08 (Saros 143)	2164 Apr 07 (Saros 144)	2175 Mar 07 (Saros 145)
2186 Feb 04 (Saros 146)	2197 Jan 04 (Saros 147)			

=== Inex series ===
This eclipse is a part of the long period inex cycle, repeating at alternating nodes, every 358 synodic months (≈ 10,571.95 days, or 29 years minus 20 days). Their appearance and longitude are irregular due to a lack of synchronization with the anomalistic month (period of perigee). However, groupings of 3 inex cycles (≈ 87 years minus 2 months) comes close (≈ 1,151.02 anomalistic months), so eclipses are similar in these groupings.

Series members between 1801 and 2200
1805 Jan 15 (Saros 121)	1833 Dec 26 (Saros 122)	1862 Dec 06 (Saros 123)
1891 Nov 16 (Saros 124)	1920 Oct 27 (Saros 125)	1949 Oct 07 (Saros 126)
1978 Sep 16 (Saros 127)	2007 Aug 28 (Saros 128)	2036 Aug 07 (Saros 129)
2065 Jul 17 (Saros 130)	2094 Jun 28 (Saros 131)	2123 Jun 09 (Saros 132)
2152 May 18 (Saros 133)	2181 Apr 29 (Saros 134)	

=== Half-Saros cycle ===
A lunar eclipse will be preceded and followed by solar eclipses by 9 years and 5.5 days (a half saros). This lunar eclipse is related to two annular solar eclipses of Solar Saros 134.

September 11, 1969	September 23, 1987

== See also ==
- List of lunar eclipses
- List of 20th-century lunar eclipses
