= August 1942 lunar eclipse =

Total lunar eclipse August 26, 1942

- Total eclipse
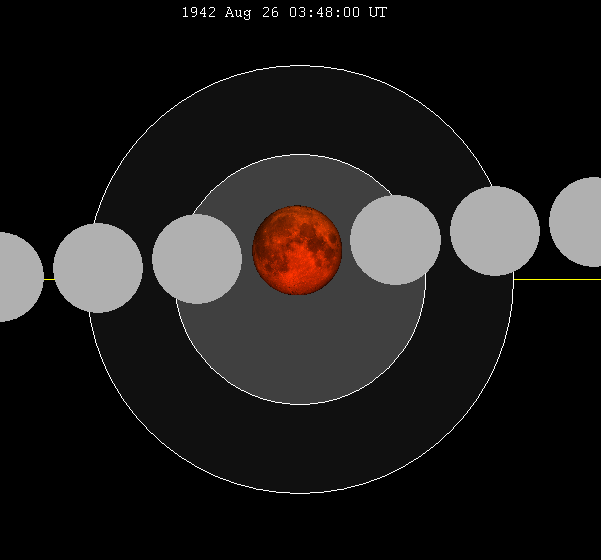
- The Moon's hourly motion shown right to left
- Date: August 26, 1942
- Gamma: 0.1818
- Magnitude: 1.5344
- Saros cycle: 127 (38 of 72)
- Totality: 93 minutes, 23 seconds
- Partiality: 214 minutes, 11 seconds
- Penumbral: 329 minutes, 32 seconds
Contacts (UTC)
- P1: 1:03:16
- U1: 2:00:53
- U2: 3:01:17
- Greatest: 3:48:00
- U3: 4:34:40
- U4: 5:35:04
- P4: 6:32:48

A total lunar eclipse occurred at the Moon’s descending node of orbit on Wednesday, August 26, 1942, with an umbral magnitude of 1.5344. It was a central lunar eclipse, in which part of the Moon passed through the center of the Earth's shadow. A lunar eclipse occurs when the Moon moves into the Earth's shadow, causing the Moon to be darkened. A total lunar eclipse occurs when the Moon's near side entirely passes into the Earth's umbral shadow. Unlike a solar eclipse, which can only be viewed from a relatively small area of the world, a lunar eclipse may be viewed from anywhere on the night side of Earth. A total lunar eclipse can last up to nearly two hours, while a total solar eclipse lasts only a few minutes at any given place, because the Moon's shadow is smaller. Occurring about 2.7 days after perigee (on August 23, 1942, at 9:50 UTC), the Moon's apparent diameter was larger.

== Visibility ==
The eclipse was completely visible over eastern North America, South America, west Africa, and Antarctica, seen rising over western North America and the eastern Pacific Ocean and setting over Africa, Europe, and the Middle East.

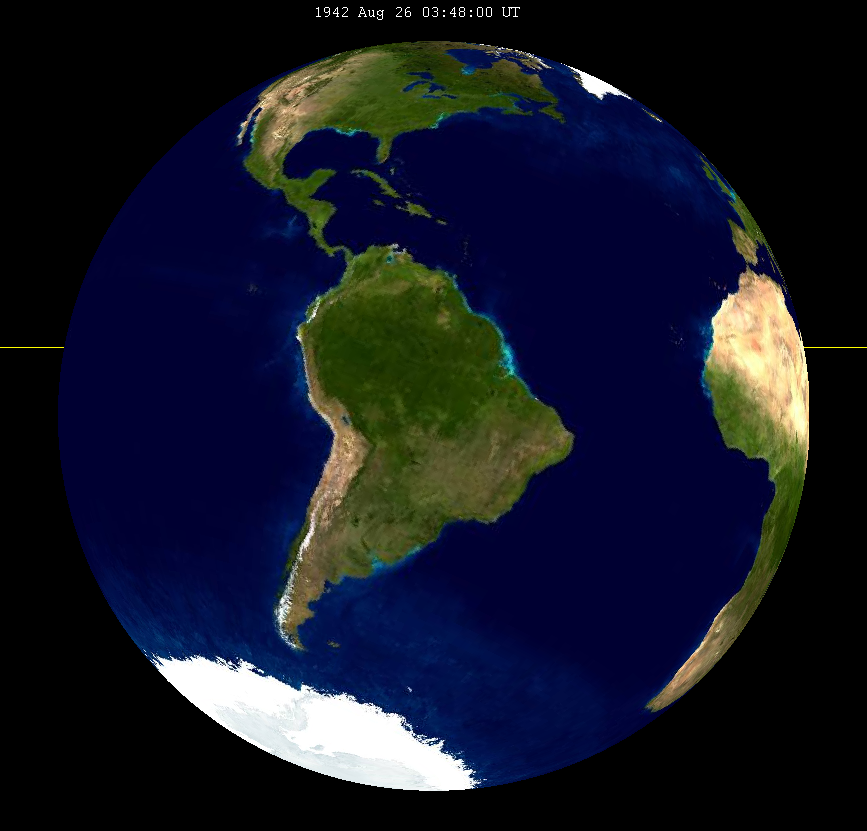
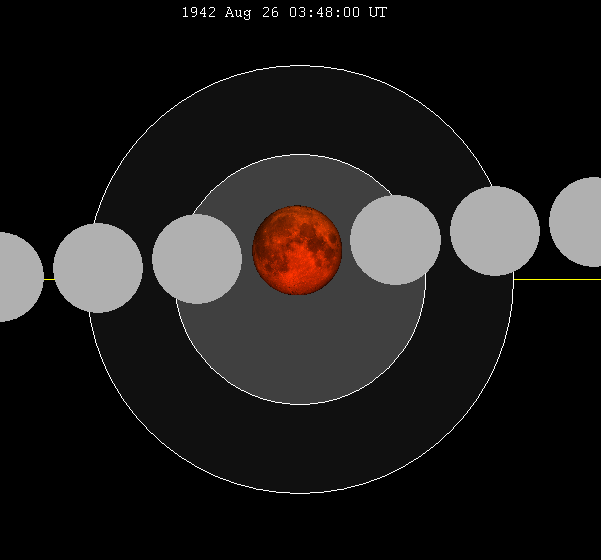

== Eclipse details ==
Shown below is a table displaying details about this particular solar eclipse. It describes various parameters pertaining to this eclipse.

August 26, 1942 Lunar Eclipse Parameters
| Parameter | Value |
|---|---|
| Penumbral Magnitude | 2.51418 |
| Umbral Magnitude | 1.53440 |
| Gamma | 0.18180 |
| Sun Right Ascension | 10h17m03.7s |
| Sun Declination | +10°39'49.6" |
| Sun Semi-Diameter | 15'49.7" |
| Sun Equatorial Horizontal Parallax | 08.7" |
| Moon Right Ascension | 22h16m52.1s |
| Moon Declination | -10°29'26.0" |
| Moon Semi-Diameter | 16'09.3" |
| Moon Equatorial Horizontal Parallax | 0°59'17.3" |
| ΔT | 25.7 s |

== Eclipse season ==
This eclipse is part of an eclipse season, a period, roughly every six months, when eclipses occur. Only two (or occasionally three) eclipse seasons occur each year, and each season lasts about 35 days and repeats just short of six months (173 days) later; thus two full eclipse seasons always occur each year. Either two or three eclipses happen each eclipse season. In the sequence below, each eclipse is separated by a fortnight. The first and last eclipse in this sequence is separated by one synodic month.

Eclipse season of August–September 1942
| August 12 Ascending node (new moon) | August 26 Descending node (full moon) | September 10 Ascending node (new moon) |
|---|---|---|
| Partial solar eclipse Solar Saros 115 | Total lunar eclipse Lunar Saros 127 | Partial solar eclipse Solar Saros 153 |

== Related eclipses ==
=== Eclipses in 1942 ===
- A total lunar eclipse on March 3.
- A partial solar eclipse on March 16.
- A partial solar eclipse on August 12.
- A total lunar eclipse on August 26.
- A partial solar eclipse on September 10.

=== Metonic ===
- Preceded by: Lunar eclipse of November 7, 1938
- Followed by: Lunar eclipse of June 14, 1946

=== Tzolkinex ===
- Preceded by: Lunar eclipse of July 16, 1935
- Followed by: Lunar eclipse of October 7, 1949

=== Half-Saros ===
- Preceded by: Solar eclipse of August 21, 1933
- Followed by: Solar eclipse of September 1, 1951

=== Tritos ===
- Preceded by: Lunar eclipse of September 26, 1931
- Followed by: Lunar eclipse of July 26, 1953

=== Lunar Saros 127 ===
- Preceded by: Lunar eclipse of August 14, 1924
- Followed by: Lunar eclipse of September 5, 1960

=== Inex ===
- Preceded by: Lunar eclipse of September 15, 1913
- Followed by: Lunar eclipse of August 6, 1971

=== Triad ===
- Preceded by: Lunar eclipse of October 25, 1855
- Followed by: Lunar eclipse of June 26, 2029

=== Lunar eclipses of 1940–1944 ===
This eclipse is a member of a semester series. An eclipse in a semester series of lunar eclipses repeats approximately every 177 days and 4 hours (a semester) at alternating nodes of the Moon's orbit.

The penumbral lunar eclipses on April 22, 1940 and October 16, 1940 occur in the previous lunar year eclipse set, and the penumbral lunar eclipses on July 6, 1944 and December 29, 1944 occur in the next lunar year eclipse set.

Lunar eclipse series sets from 1940 to 1944
| Ascending node | | | | Descending node | | | |
| Saros | Date Viewing | Type Chart | Gamma | Saros | Date Viewing | Type Chart | Gamma |
| 102 | 1940 Mar 23 | Penumbral | −1.5034 | 107 | | | |
| 112 | 1941 Mar 13 | Partial | −0.8437 | 117 | 1941 Sep 05 | Partial | 0.9747 |
| 122 | 1942 Mar 03 | Total | −0.1545 | 127 | 1942 Aug 26 | Total | 0.1818 |
| 132 | 1943 Feb 20 | Partial | 0.5752 | 137 | 1943 Aug 15 | Partial | −0.5534 |
| 142 | 1944 Feb 09 | Penumbral | 1.2698 | 147 | 1944 Aug 04 | Penumbral | −1.2843 |

=== Saros 127 ===
This eclipse is a part of Saros series 127, repeating every 18 years, 11 days, and containing 72 events. The series started with a penumbral lunar eclipse on July 9, 1275. It contains partial eclipses from November 4, 1473 through May 18, 1780; total eclipses from May 29, 1798 through November 9, 2068; and a second set of partial eclipses from November 20, 2086 through June 17, 2429. The series ends at member 72 as a penumbral eclipse on September 2, 2555.

The longest duration of totality was produced by member 35 at 101 minutes, 46 seconds on July 23, 1888. All eclipses in this series occur at the Moon’s descending node of orbit.

| Greatest | First | | | |
|---|---|---|---|---|
| The greatest eclipse of the series occurred on 1888 Jul 23, lasting 101 minutes, 46 seconds. | Penumbral | Partial | Total | Central |
| The greatest eclipse of the series occurred on 1888 Jul 23, lasting 101 minutes, 46 seconds. | 1275 Jul 09 | 1473 Nov 04 | 1798 May 29 | 1834 Jun 21 |
| The greatest eclipse of the series occurred on 1888 Jul 23, lasting 101 minutes, 46 seconds. | Last | | | |
| The greatest eclipse of the series occurred on 1888 Jul 23, lasting 101 minutes, 46 seconds. | Central | Total | Partial | Penumbral |
| The greatest eclipse of the series occurred on 1888 Jul 23, lasting 101 minutes, 46 seconds. | 1960 Sep 05 | 2068 Nov 09 | 2429 Jun 17 | 2555 Sep 02 |

Eclipses are tabulated in three columns; every third eclipse in the same column is one exeligmos apart, so they all cast shadows over approximately the same parts of the Earth.

Series members 31–52 occur between 1801 and 2200:
| 31 | 32 | 33 |
|---|---|---|
| 1816 Jun 10 | 1834 Jun 21 | 1852 Jul 01 |
| 34 | 35 | 36 |
| 1870 Jul 12 | 1888 Jul 23 | 1906 Aug 04 |
| 37 | 38 | 39 |
| 1924 Aug 14 | 1942 Aug 26 | 1960 Sep 05 |
| 40 | 41 | 42 |
| 1978 Sep 16 | 1996 Sep 27 | 2014 Oct 08 |
| 43 | 44 | 45 |
| 2032 Oct 18 | 2050 Oct 30 | 2068 Nov 09 |
| 46 | 47 | 48 |
| 2086 Nov 20 | 2104 Dec 02 | 2122 Dec 13 |
| 49 | 50 | 51 |
| 2140 Dec 23 | 2159 Jan 04 | 2177 Jan 14 |
52
2195 Jan 26

=== Tritos series ===
This eclipse is a part of a tritos cycle, repeating at alternating nodes every 135 synodic months (≈ 3986.63 days, or 11 years minus 1 month). Their appearance and longitude are irregular due to a lack of synchronization with the anomalistic month (period of perigee), but groupings of 3 tritos cycles (≈ 33 years minus 3 months) come close (≈ 434.044 anomalistic months), so eclipses are similar in these groupings.

Series members between 1801 and 2200
| 1811 Sep 02 (Saros 115) | 1822 Aug 03 (Saros 116) | 1833 Jul 02 (Saros 117) | 1844 May 31 (Saros 118) | 1855 May 02 (Saros 119) |
| 1866 Mar 31 (Saros 120) | 1877 Feb 27 (Saros 121) | 1888 Jan 28 (Saros 122) | 1898 Dec 27 (Saros 123) | 1909 Nov 27 (Saros 124) |
| 1920 Oct 27 (Saros 125) | 1931 Sep 26 (Saros 126) | 1942 Aug 26 (Saros 127) | 1953 Jul 26 (Saros 128) | 1964 Jun 25 (Saros 129) |
| 1975 May 25 (Saros 130) | 1986 Apr 24 (Saros 131) | 1997 Mar 24 (Saros 132) | 2008 Feb 21 (Saros 133) | 2019 Jan 21 (Saros 134) |
| 2029 Dec 20 (Saros 135) | 2040 Nov 18 (Saros 136) | 2051 Oct 19 (Saros 137) | 2062 Sep 18 (Saros 138) | 2073 Aug 17 (Saros 139) |
| 2084 Jul 17 (Saros 140) | 2095 Jun 17 (Saros 141) | 2106 May 17 (Saros 142) | 2117 Apr 16 (Saros 143) | 2128 Mar 16 (Saros 144) |
| 2139 Feb 13 (Saros 145) | 2150 Jan 13 (Saros 146) | 2160 Dec 13 (Saros 147) | 2171 Nov 12 (Saros 148) | 2182 Oct 11 (Saros 149) |
2193 Sep 11 (Saros 150)

=== Inex series ===
This eclipse is a part of the long period inex cycle, repeating at alternating nodes, every 358 synodic months (≈ 10,571.95 days, or 29 years minus 20 days). Their appearance and longitude are irregular due to a lack of synchronization with the anomalistic month (period of perigee). However, groupings of 3 inex cycles (≈ 87 years minus 2 months) comes close (≈ 1,151.02 anomalistic months), so eclipses are similar in these groupings.

Series members between 1801 and 2200
| 1826 Nov 14 (Saros 123) | 1855 Oct 25 (Saros 124) | 1884 Oct 04 (Saros 125) |
| 1913 Sep 15 (Saros 126) | 1942 Aug 26 (Saros 127) | 1971 Aug 06 (Saros 128) |
| 2000 Jul 16 (Saros 129) | 2029 Jun 26 (Saros 130) | 2058 Jun 06 (Saros 131) |
| 2087 May 17 (Saros 132) | 2116 Apr 27 (Saros 133) | 2145 Apr 07 (Saros 134) |
2174 Mar 18 (Saros 135)

=== Half-Saros cycle ===
A lunar eclipse will be preceded and followed by solar eclipses by 9 years and 5.5 days (a half saros). This lunar eclipse is related to two total solar eclipses of Solar Saros 134.

| August 21, 1933 | September 1, 1951 |

== See also ==
- List of lunar eclipses and List of 21st-century lunar eclipses
