= October 2032 lunar eclipse =

Astronomical event

- Total eclipse
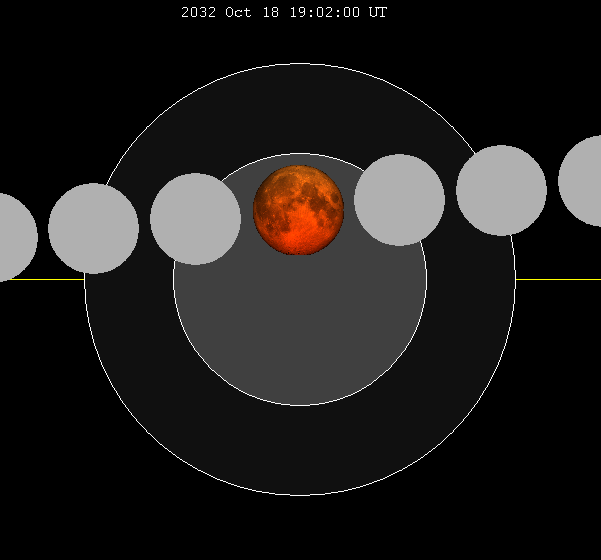
- The Moon's hourly motion shown right to left
- Date: October 18, 2032
- Gamma: 0.4169
- Magnitude: 1.1039
- Saros cycle: 127 (43 of 72)
- Totality: 47 minutes, 6 seconds
- Partiality: 195 minutes, 54 seconds
- Penumbral: 315 minutes, 24 seconds
Contacts (UTC)
- P1: 16:25:58
- U1: 17:25:43
- U2: 18:40:07
- Greatest: 19:03:40
- U3: 19:27:13
- U4: 20:41:37
- P4: 21:41:22

A total lunar eclipse will occur at the Moon’s descending node of orbit on Monday, October 18, 2032, with an umbral magnitude of 1.1039. A lunar eclipse occurs when the Moon moves into the Earth's shadow, causing the Moon to be darkened. A total lunar eclipse occurs when the Moon's near side entirely passes into the Earth's umbral shadow. Unlike a solar eclipse, which can only be viewed from a relatively small area of the world, a lunar eclipse may be viewed from anywhere on the night side of Earth. A total lunar eclipse can last up to nearly two hours, while a total solar eclipse lasts only a few minutes at any given place, because the Moon's shadow is smaller. Occurring about 2.1 days after perigee (on October 16, 2032, at 17:25 UTC), the Moon's apparent diameter will be larger.

This lunar eclipse is the second of a tetrad, with four total lunar eclipses in series, the others being on April 25, 2032; April 14, 2033; and October 8, 2033.

== Visibility ==
The eclipse will be completely visible over east Africa, Europe, and Asia, seen rising over west Africa and eastern South America and setting over Australia and the western Pacific Ocean.

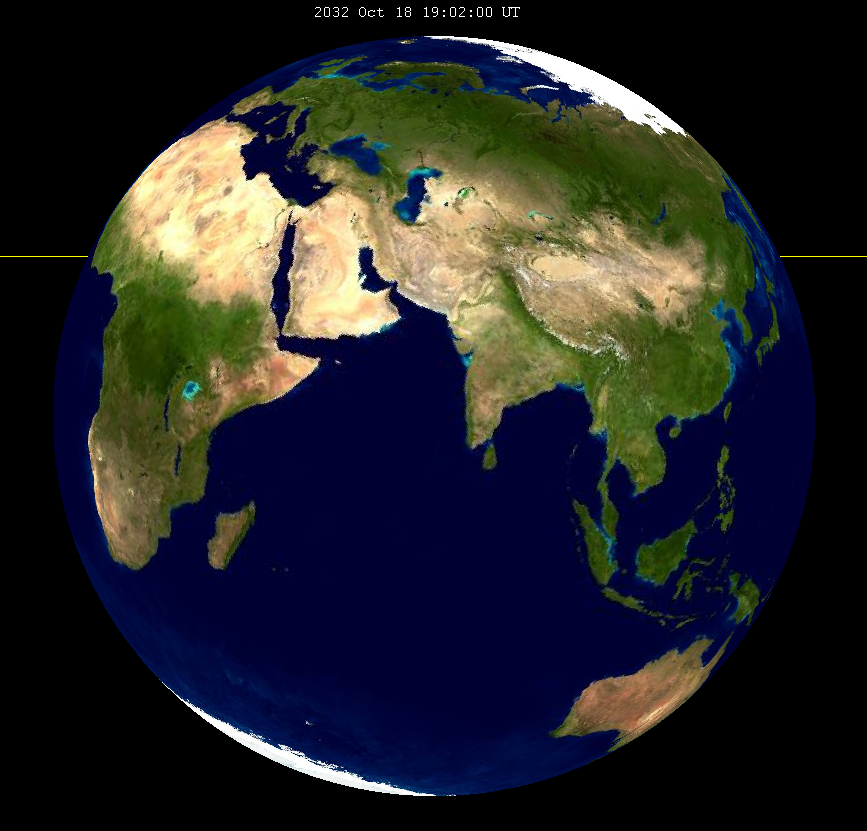
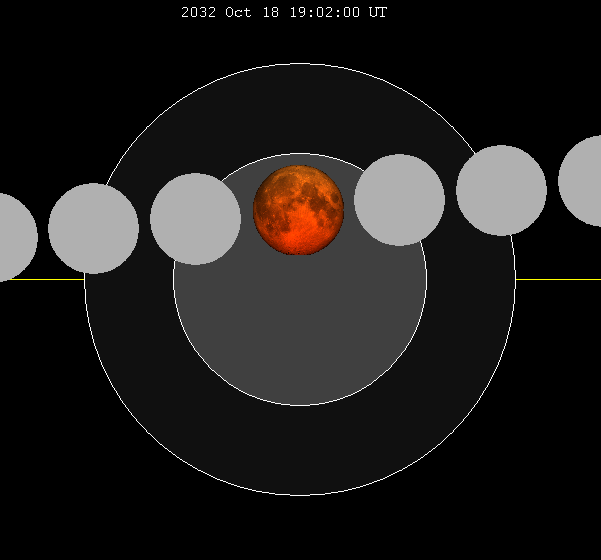

== Eclipse details ==
Shown below is a table displaying details about this particular solar eclipse. It describes various parameters pertaining to this eclipse.

October 18, 2032 Lunar Eclipse Parameters
Parameter	Value
Penumbral Magnitude	2.08413
Umbral Magnitude	1.10390
Gamma	0.41692
Sun Right Ascension	13h36m15.4s
Sun Declination	-10°01'20.8"
Sun Semi-Diameter	16'03.4"
Sun Equatorial Horizontal Parallax	08.8"
Moon Right Ascension	01h35m47.9s
Moon Declination	+10°25'28.7"
Moon Semi-Diameter	16'22.8"
Moon Equatorial Horizontal Parallax	1°00'07.0"
ΔT	75.3 s

== Eclipse season ==
This eclipse is part of an eclipse season, a period, roughly every six months, when eclipses occur. Only two (or occasionally three) eclipse seasons occur each year, and each season lasts about 35 days and repeats just short of six months (173 days) later; thus two full eclipse seasons always occur each year. Either two or three eclipses happen each eclipse season. In the sequence below, each eclipse is separated by a fortnight.

Eclipse season of October–November 2032
October 18 Descending node (full moon)	November 3 Ascending node (new moon)
Total lunar eclipse Lunar Saros 127	Partial solar eclipse Solar Saros 153

== Related eclipses ==
=== Eclipses in 2032 ===
- A total lunar eclipse on April 25.
- An annular solar eclipse on May 9.
- A total lunar eclipse on October 18.
- A partial solar eclipse on November 3.

=== Metonic ===
- Preceded by: Lunar eclipse of December 31, 2028
- Followed by: Lunar eclipse of August 7, 2036

=== Tzolkinex ===
- Preceded by: Lunar eclipse of September 7, 2025
- Followed by: Lunar eclipse of November 30, 2039

=== Half-Saros ===
- Preceded by: Solar eclipse of October 14, 2023
- Followed by: Solar eclipse of October 25, 2041

=== Tritos ===
- Preceded by: Lunar eclipse of November 19, 2021
- Followed by: Lunar eclipse of September 19, 2043

=== Lunar Saros 127 ===
- Preceded by: Lunar eclipse of October 8, 2014
- Followed by: Lunar eclipse of October 30, 2050

=== Inex ===
- Preceded by: Lunar eclipse of November 9, 2003
- Followed by: Lunar eclipse of September 29, 2061

=== Triad ===
- Preceded by: Lunar eclipse of December 19, 1945
- Followed by: Lunar eclipse of August 20, 2119

=== Lunar eclipses of 2031–2034 ===
This eclipse is a member of a semester series. An eclipse in a semester series of lunar eclipses repeats approximately every 177 days and 4 hours (a semester) at alternating nodes of the Moon's orbit.

The penumbral lunar eclipse on June 5, 2031 occurs in the previous lunar year eclipse set.

Lunar eclipse series sets from 2031 to 2034
Ascending node				Descending node			
Saros	Date Viewing	Type Chart	Gamma	Saros	Date Viewing	Type Chart	Gamma
112	2031 May 07	Penumbral	−1.0694	117	2031 Oct 30	Penumbral	1.1774
122	2032 Apr 25	Total	−0.3558	127	2032 Oct 18	Total	0.4169
132	2033 Apr 14	Total	0.3954	137	2033 Oct 08	Total	−0.2889
142	2034 Apr 03	Penumbral	1.1144	147	2034 Sep 28	Partial	−1.0110

=== Saros 127 ===
This eclipse is a part of Saros series 127, repeating every 18 years, 11 days, and containing 72 events. The series started with a penumbral lunar eclipse on July 9, 1275. It contains partial eclipses from November 4, 1473 through May 18, 1780; total eclipses from May 29, 1798 through November 9, 2068; and a second set of partial eclipses from November 20, 2086 through June 17, 2429. The series ends at member 72 as a penumbral eclipse on September 2, 2555.

The longest duration of totality was produced by member 35 at 101 minutes, 46 seconds on July 23, 1888. All eclipses in this series occur at the Moon’s descending node of orbit.

Greatest	First			
The greatest eclipse of the series occurred on 1888 Jul 23, lasting 101 minutes, 46 seconds.	Penumbral	Partial	Total	Central
The greatest eclipse of the series occurred on 1888 Jul 23, lasting 101 minutes, 46 seconds.	1275 Jul 09	1473 Nov 04	1798 May 29	1834 Jun 21
The greatest eclipse of the series occurred on 1888 Jul 23, lasting 101 minutes, 46 seconds.	Last			
The greatest eclipse of the series occurred on 1888 Jul 23, lasting 101 minutes, 46 seconds.	Central	Total	Partial	Penumbral
The greatest eclipse of the series occurred on 1888 Jul 23, lasting 101 minutes, 46 seconds.	1960 Sep 05	2068 Nov 09	2429 Jun 17	2555 Sep 02

Eclipses are tabulated in three columns; every third eclipse in the same column is one exeligmos apart, so they all cast shadows over approximately the same parts of the Earth.

Series members 31–52 occur between 1801 and 2200:
31	32	33
1816 Jun 10	1834 Jun 21	1852 Jul 01
34	35	36
1870 Jul 12	1888 Jul 23	1906 Aug 04
37	38	39
1924 Aug 14	1942 Aug 26	1960 Sep 05
40	41	42
1978 Sep 16	1996 Sep 27	2014 Oct 08
43	44	45
2032 Oct 18	2050 Oct 30	2068 Nov 09
46	47	48
2086 Nov 20	2104 Dec 02	2122 Dec 13
49	50	51
2140 Dec 23	2159 Jan 04	2177 Jan 14
52
2195 Jan 26

=== Tritos series ===
This eclipse is a part of a tritos cycle, repeating at alternating nodes every 135 synodic months (≈ 3986.63 days, or 11 years minus 1 month). Their appearance and longitude are irregular due to a lack of synchronization with the anomalistic month (period of perigee), but groupings of 3 tritos cycles (≈ 33 years minus 3 months) come close (≈ 434.044 anomalistic months), so eclipses are similar in these groupings.

Series members between 1801 and 2200
1803 Aug 03 (Saros 106)	1814 Jul 02 (Saros 107)	1825 Jun 01 (Saros 108)	1836 May 01 (Saros 109)	1847 Mar 31 (Saros 110)
1858 Feb 27 (Saros 111)	1869 Jan 28 (Saros 112)	1879 Dec 28 (Saros 113)	1890 Nov 26 (Saros 114)	1901 Oct 27 (Saros 115)
1912 Sep 26 (Saros 116)	1923 Aug 26 (Saros 117)	1934 Jul 26 (Saros 118)	1945 Jun 25 (Saros 119)	1956 May 24 (Saros 120)
1967 Apr 24 (Saros 121)	1978 Mar 24 (Saros 122)	1989 Feb 20 (Saros 123)	2000 Jan 21 (Saros 124)	2010 Dec 21 (Saros 125)
2021 Nov 19 (Saros 126)	2032 Oct 18 (Saros 127)	2043 Sep 19 (Saros 128)	2054 Aug 18 (Saros 129)	2065 Jul 17 (Saros 130)
2076 Jun 17 (Saros 131)	2087 May 17 (Saros 132)	2098 Apr 15 (Saros 133)	2109 Mar 17 (Saros 134)	2120 Feb 14 (Saros 135)
2131 Jan 13 (Saros 136)	2141 Dec 13 (Saros 137)	2152 Nov 12 (Saros 138)	2163 Oct 12 (Saros 139)	2174 Sep 11 (Saros 140)
2185 Aug 11 (Saros 141)	2196 Jul 10 (Saros 142)			

=== Inex series ===
This eclipse is a part of the long period inex cycle, repeating at alternating nodes, every 358 synodic months (≈ 10,571.95 days, or 29 years minus 20 days). Their appearance and longitude are irregular due to a lack of synchronization with the anomalistic month (period of perigee). However, groupings of 3 inex cycles (≈ 87 years minus 2 months) comes close (≈ 1,151.02 anomalistic months), so eclipses are similar in these groupings.

Series members between 1801 and 2200
1801 Mar 30 (Saros 119)	1830 Mar 09 (Saros 120)	1859 Feb 17 (Saros 121)
1888 Jan 28 (Saros 122)	1917 Jan 08 (Saros 123)	1945 Dec 19 (Saros 124)
1974 Nov 29 (Saros 125)	2003 Nov 09 (Saros 126)	2032 Oct 18 (Saros 127)
2061 Sep 29 (Saros 128)	2090 Sep 08 (Saros 129)	2119 Aug 20 (Saros 130)
2148 Jul 31 (Saros 131)	2177 Jul 11 (Saros 132)	

=== Half-Saros cycle ===
A lunar eclipse will be preceded and followed by solar eclipses by 9 years and 5.5 days (a half saros). This lunar eclipse is related to two partial solar eclipses of Solar Saros 134.

October 14, 2023	October 25, 2041

== See also ==
- List of lunar eclipses and List of 21st-century lunar eclipses
