= September 1996 lunar eclipse =

Total lunar eclipse September 27, 1996

- Total eclipse
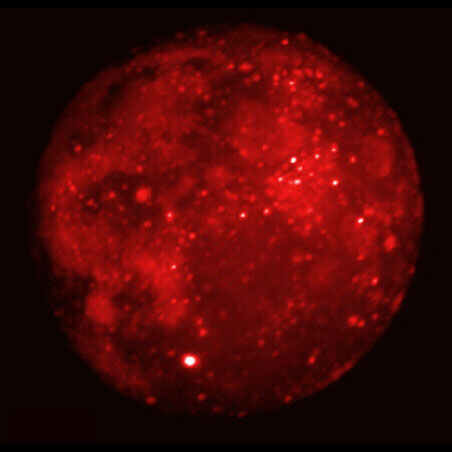
- Mid-infrared image of the Moon taken by the SPIRIT-III instrument aboard the orbiting Midcourse Space Experiment (MSX) satellite
- Date: September 27, 1996
- Gamma: 0.3426
- Magnitude: 1.2395
- Saros cycle: 127 (41 of 72)
- Totality: 69 minutes, 12 seconds
- Partiality: 203 minutes, 17 seconds
- Penumbral: 320 minutes, 52 seconds
Contacts (UTC)
- P1: 0:13:59
- U1: 1:12:43
- U2: 2:19:46
- Greatest: 2:54:22
- U3: 3:28:57
- U4: 4:35:59
- P4: 5:34:51

A total lunar eclipse occurred at the Moon’s descending node of orbit on Friday, September 27, 1996, with an umbral magnitude of 1.2395. A lunar eclipse occurs when the Moon moves into the Earth's shadow, causing the Moon to be darkened. A total lunar eclipse occurs when the Moon's near side entirely passes into the Earth's umbral shadow. Unlike a solar eclipse, which can only be viewed from a relatively small area of the world, a lunar eclipse may be viewed from anywhere on the night side of Earth. A total lunar eclipse can last up to nearly two hours, while a total solar eclipse lasts only a few minutes at any given place, because the Moon's shadow is smaller. Occurring about 2.2 days after perigee (on September 24, 1996, at 22:40 UTC), the Moon's apparent diameter was larger.

This lunar eclipse was the second of an almost tetrad, with the others being on April 4, 1996 (total); March 24, 1997 (partial); and September 16, 1997 (total).

== Visibility ==
The eclipse was completely visible over eastern North America, South America, western Europe, and west Africa, seen rising over western North America and the eastern and central Pacific Ocean and setting over eastern Europe, central and east Africa, and the western half of Asia.

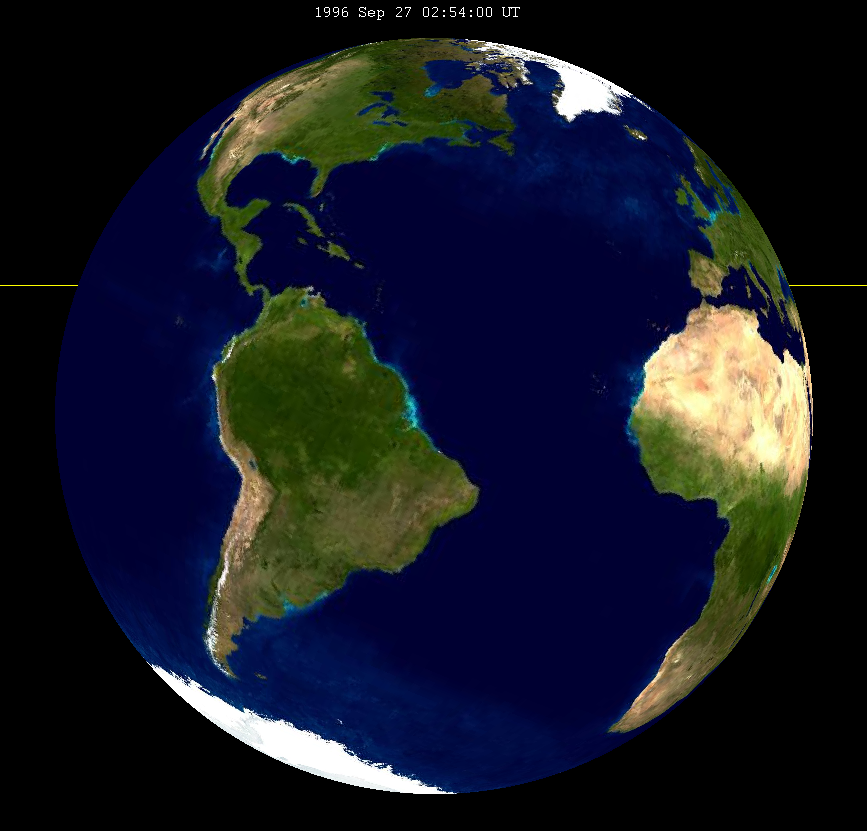
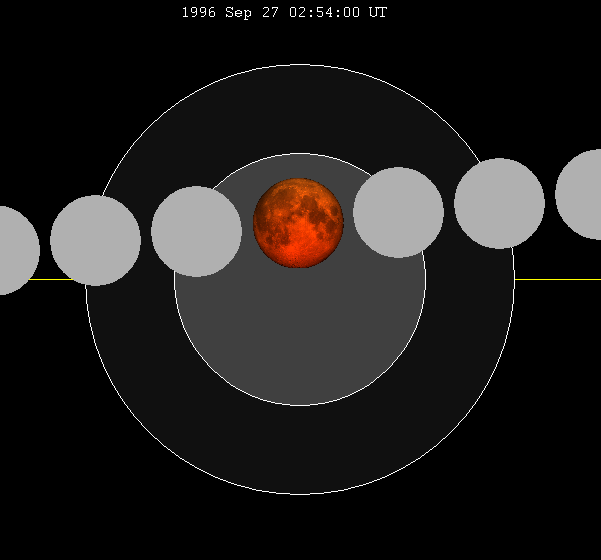

== Mid-infrared image of the Moon ==
During its totality, the Midcourse Space Experiment (MSX) satellite's SPIRIT-III instrument took the image of the Moon in mid-infrared. At these wavelengths, MSX was able to characterize the thermal (heat) distribution of the lunar surface during the eclipse. The brightest regions are the warmest, and the darkest areas are the coolest. The well-known crater Tycho is the bright object to the south of center. Numerous other craters are also seen as bright spots, indicating that their temperature is higher than in the surrounding dark mare.

== Eclipse details ==
Shown below is a table displaying details about this particular lunar eclipse. It describes various parameters pertaining to this eclipse.

September 27, 1996 lunar eclipse parameters
Parameter	Value
Penumbral magnitude	2.21885
Umbral magnitude	1.23953
Gamma	0.34264
Sun right ascension	12h15m43.1s
Sun declination	-01°42'06.3"
Sun semi-diameter	15'57.5"
Sun equatorial horizontal parallax	08.8"
Moon right ascension	00h15m18.1s
Moon declination	+02°01'37.4"
Moon semi-diameter	16'17.8"
Moon equatorial horizontal parallax	0°59'48.4"
ΔT	62.1 s

== Eclipse season ==
This eclipse is part of an eclipse season, a period, roughly every six months, when eclipses occur. Only two (or occasionally three) eclipse seasons occur each year, and each season lasts about 35 days and repeats just short of six months (173 days) later; thus two full eclipse seasons always occur each year. Either two or three eclipses happen each eclipse season. In the sequence below, each eclipse is separated by a fortnight.

Eclipse season of September–October 1996
September 27 Descending node (full moon)	October 12 Ascending node (new moon)
Total lunar eclipse Lunar Saros 127	Partial solar eclipse Solar Saros 153

== Related eclipses ==
=== Eclipses in 1996 ===
- A total lunar eclipse on April 4
- A partial solar eclipse on April 17
- A total lunar eclipse on September 27
- A partial solar eclipse on October 12

=== Metonic ===
- Preceded by: Lunar eclipse of December 9, 1992
- Followed by: Lunar eclipse of July 16, 2000

=== Tzolkinex ===
- Preceded by: Lunar eclipse of August 17, 1989
- Followed by: Lunar eclipse of November 9, 2003

=== Half-Saros ===
- Preceded by: Solar eclipse of September 23, 1987
- Followed by: Solar eclipse of October 3, 2005

=== Tritos ===
- Preceded by: Lunar eclipse of October 28, 1985
- Followed by: Lunar eclipse of August 28, 2007

=== Lunar Saros 127 ===
- Preceded by: Lunar eclipse of September 16, 1978
- Followed by: Lunar eclipse of October 8, 2014

=== Inex ===
- Preceded by: Lunar eclipse of October 18, 1967
- Followed by: Lunar eclipse of September 7, 2025

=== Triad ===
- Preceded by: Lunar eclipse of November 27, 1909
- Followed by: Lunar eclipse of July 29, 2083

=== Lunar eclipses of 1995–1998 ===
This eclipse is a member of a semester series. An eclipse in a semester series of lunar eclipses repeats approximately every 177 days and 4 hours (a semester) at alternating nodes of the Moon's orbit.

The penumbral lunar eclipse on August 8, 1998 occurs in the next lunar year eclipse set.

Lunar eclipse series sets from 1995 to 1998
Ascending node				Descending node			
Saros	Date Viewing	Type Chart	Gamma	Saros	Date Viewing	Type Chart	Gamma
112	1995 Apr 15	Partial	−0.9594	117	1995 Oct 08	Penumbral	1.1179
122	1996 Apr 04	Total	−0.2534	127	1996 Sep 27	Total	0.3426
132	1997 Mar 24	Partial	0.4899	137	1997 Sep 16	Total	−0.3768
142	1998 Mar 13	Penumbral	1.1964	147	1998 Sep 06	Penumbral	−1.1058

=== Saros 127 ===
This eclipse is a part of Saros series 127, repeating every 18 years, 11 days, and containing 72 events. The series started with a penumbral lunar eclipse on July 9, 1275. It contains partial eclipses from November 4, 1473 through May 18, 1780; total eclipses from May 29, 1798 through November 9, 2068; and a second set of partial eclipses from November 20, 2086 through June 17, 2429. The series ends at member 72 as a penumbral eclipse on September 2, 2555.

The longest duration of totality was produced by member 35 at 101 minutes, 46 seconds on July 23, 1888. All eclipses in this series occur at the Moon’s descending node of orbit.

Greatest	First			
The greatest eclipse of the series occurred on 1888 Jul 23, lasting 101 minutes, 46 seconds.	Penumbral	Partial	Total	Central
The greatest eclipse of the series occurred on 1888 Jul 23, lasting 101 minutes, 46 seconds.	1275 Jul 09	1473 Nov 04	1798 May 29	1834 Jun 21
The greatest eclipse of the series occurred on 1888 Jul 23, lasting 101 minutes, 46 seconds.	Last			
The greatest eclipse of the series occurred on 1888 Jul 23, lasting 101 minutes, 46 seconds.	Central	Total	Partial	Penumbral
The greatest eclipse of the series occurred on 1888 Jul 23, lasting 101 minutes, 46 seconds.	1960 Sep 05	2068 Nov 09	2429 Jun 17	2555 Sep 02

Eclipses are tabulated in three columns; every third eclipse in the same column is one exeligmos apart, so they all cast shadows over approximately the same parts of the Earth.

Series members 31–52 occur between 1801 and 2200:
31	32	33
1816 Jun 10	1834 Jun 21	1852 Jul 01
34	35	36
1870 Jul 12	1888 Jul 23	1906 Aug 04
37	38	39
1924 Aug 14	1942 Aug 26	1960 Sep 05
40	41	42
1978 Sep 16	1996 Sep 27	2014 Oct 08
43	44	45
2032 Oct 18	2050 Oct 30	2068 Nov 09
46	47	48
2086 Nov 20	2104 Dec 02	2122 Dec 13
49	50	51
2140 Dec 23	2159 Jan 04	2177 Jan 14
52
2195 Jan 26

=== Tritos series ===
This eclipse is a part of a tritos cycle, repeating at alternating nodes every 135 synodic months (≈ 3986.63 days, or 11 years minus 1 month). Their appearance and longitude are irregular due to a lack of synchronization with the anomalistic month (period of perigee), but groupings of 3 tritos cycles (≈ 33 years minus 3 months) come close (≈ 434.044 anomalistic months), so eclipses are similar in these groupings.

Series members between 1801 and 2200
1811 Mar 10 (Saros 110)	1822 Feb 06 (Saros 111)	1833 Jan 06 (Saros 112)	1843 Dec 07 (Saros 113)	1854 Nov 04 (Saros 114)
1865 Oct 04 (Saros 115)	1876 Sep 03 (Saros 116)	1887 Aug 03 (Saros 117)	1898 Jul 03 (Saros 118)	1909 Jun 04 (Saros 119)
1920 May 03 (Saros 120)	1931 Apr 02 (Saros 121)	1942 Mar 03 (Saros 122)	1953 Jan 29 (Saros 123)	1963 Dec 30 (Saros 124)
1974 Nov 29 (Saros 125)	1985 Oct 28 (Saros 126)	1996 Sep 27 (Saros 127)	2007 Aug 28 (Saros 128)	2018 Jul 27 (Saros 129)
2029 Jun 26 (Saros 130)	2040 May 26 (Saros 131)	2051 Apr 26 (Saros 132)	2062 Mar 25 (Saros 133)	2073 Feb 22 (Saros 134)
2084 Jan 22 (Saros 135)	2094 Dec 21 (Saros 136)	2105 Nov 21 (Saros 137)	2116 Oct 21 (Saros 138)	2127 Sep 20 (Saros 139)
2138 Aug 20 (Saros 140)	2149 Jul 20 (Saros 141)	2160 Jun 18 (Saros 142)	2171 May 19 (Saros 143)	2182 Apr 18 (Saros 144)
2193 Mar 17 (Saros 145)

=== Inex series ===
This eclipse is a part of the long period inex cycle, repeating at alternating nodes, every 358 synodic months (≈ 10,571.95 days, or 29 years minus 20 days). Their appearance and longitude are irregular due to a lack of synchronization with the anomalistic month (period of perigee). However, groupings of 3 inex cycles (≈ 87 years minus 2 months) comes close (≈ 1,151.02 anomalistic months), so eclipses are similar in these groupings.

Series members between 1801 and 2200
1823 Jan 26 (Saros 121)	1852 Jan 07 (Saros 122)	1880 Dec 16 (Saros 123)
1909 Nov 27 (Saros 124)	1938 Nov 07 (Saros 125)	1967 Oct 18 (Saros 126)
1996 Sep 27 (Saros 127)	2025 Sep 07 (Saros 128)	2054 Aug 18 (Saros 129)
2083 Jul 29 (Saros 130)	2112 Jul 09 (Saros 131)	2141 Jun 19 (Saros 132)
2170 May 30 (Saros 133)	2199 May 10 (Saros 134)	

=== Half-Saros cycle ===
A lunar eclipse will be preceded and followed by solar eclipses by 9 years and 5.5 days (a half saros). This lunar eclipse is related to two annular solar eclipses of Solar Saros 134.

September 23, 1987	October 3, 2005

== See also ==
- List of lunar eclipses
- List of 20th-century lunar eclipses
