= 1996 lunar eclipse =

Two total lunar eclipses occurred in 1996:

- 4 April 1996 lunar eclipse
- 27 September 1996 lunar eclipse

== See also ==
- List of 20th-century lunar eclipses
- Lists of lunar eclipses
