= 1960 lunar eclipse =

Two total lunar eclipses occurred in 1960:

- 13 March 1960 lunar eclipse
- 5 September 1960 lunar eclipse

== See also ==
- List of 20th-century lunar eclipses
- Lists of lunar eclipses
