= 1985 lunar eclipse =

Two total lunar eclipses occurred in 1985:

- 4 May 1985 lunar eclipse
- 28 October 1985 lunar eclipse

== See also ==
- List of 20th-century lunar eclipses
- Lists of lunar eclipses
