= September 1960 lunar eclipse =

Total lunar eclipse September 5, 1960

- Total eclipse
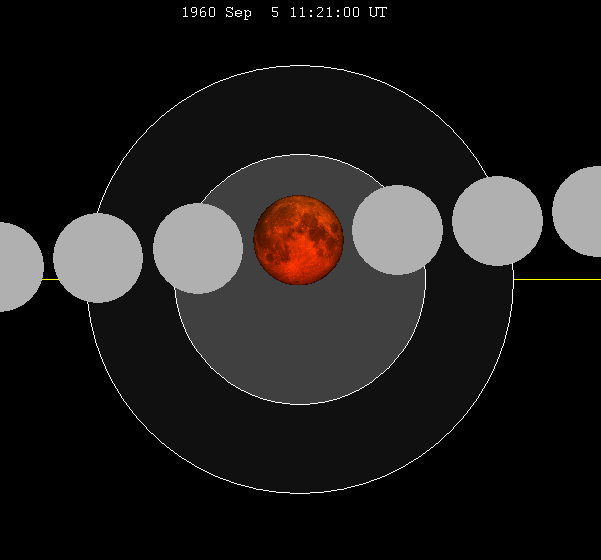
- The Moon's hourly motion shown right to left
- Date: September 5, 1960
- Gamma: 0.2422
- Magnitude: 1.4239
- Saros cycle: 127 (39 of 72)
- Totality: 86 minutes, 40 seconds
- Partiality: 210 minutes, 50 seconds
- Penumbral: 326 minutes, 44 seconds
Contacts (UTC)
- P1: 8:37:58
- U1: 9:35:52
- U2: 10:37:57
- Greatest: 11:21:17
- U3: 12:04:37
- U4: 13:06:41
- P4: 14:04:42

A total lunar eclipse occurred at the Moon’s descending node of orbit on Monday, September 5, 1960, with an umbral magnitude of 1.4239. It was a central lunar eclipse, in which part of the Moon passed through the center of the Earth's shadow. A lunar eclipse occurs when the Moon moves into the Earth's shadow, causing the Moon to be darkened. A total lunar eclipse occurs when the Moon's near side entirely passes into the Earth's umbral shadow. Unlike a solar eclipse, which can only be viewed from a relatively small area of the world, a lunar eclipse may be viewed from anywhere on the night side of Earth. A total lunar eclipse can last up to nearly two hours, while a total solar eclipse lasts only a few minutes at any given place, because the Moon's shadow is smaller. Occurring about 2.5 days after perigee (on September 2, 1960, at 22:20 UTC), the Moon's apparent diameter was larger.

== Visibility ==
The eclipse was completely visible over eastern Australia, northeast Asia, and northwestern North America, seen rising over western Australia and the eastern half of Asia and setting over North and South America.

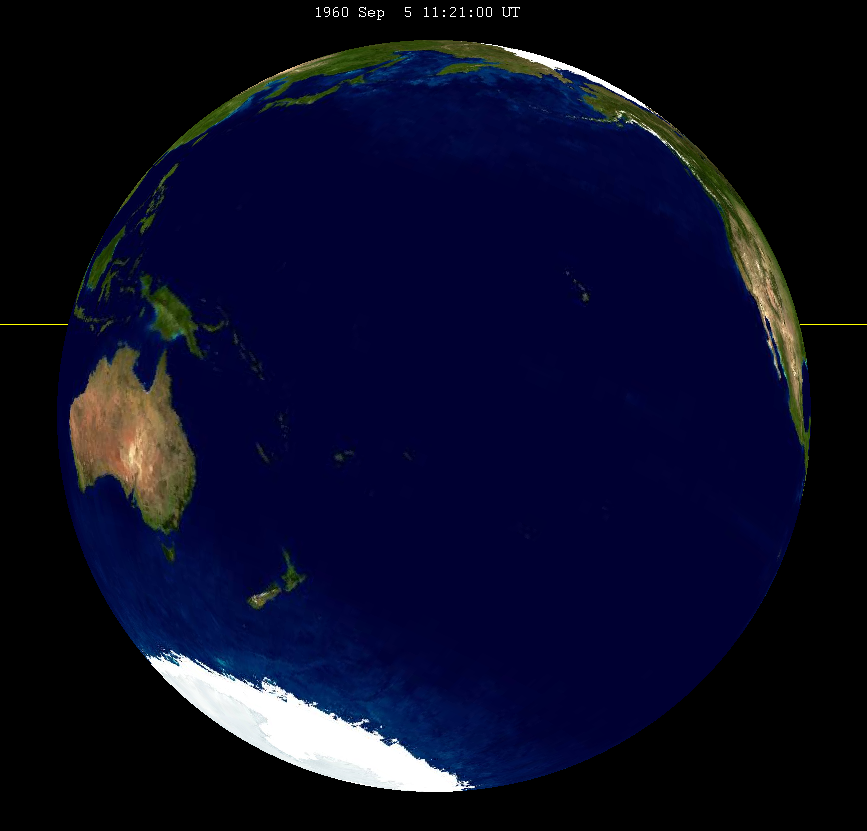
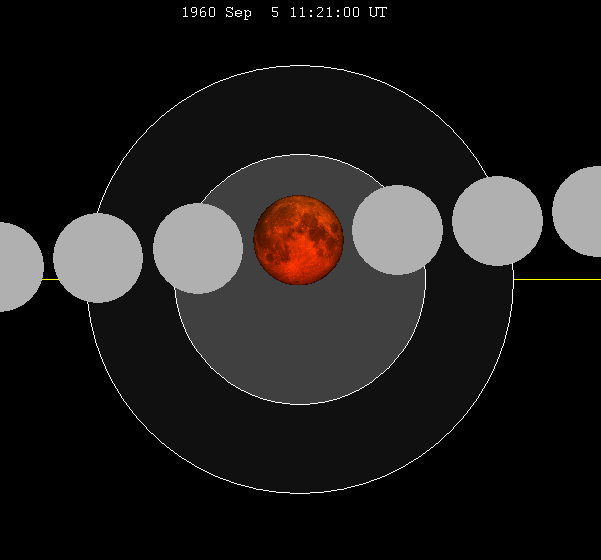

== Eclipse details ==
Shown below is a table displaying details about this particular solar eclipse. It describes various parameters pertaining to this eclipse.

September 5, 1960 Lunar Eclipse Parameters
Parameter	Value
Penumbral Magnitude	2.40311
Umbral Magnitude	1.42386
Gamma	0.24219
Sun Right Ascension	10h56m53.2s
Sun Declination	+06°43'28.1"
Sun Semi-Diameter	15'52.0"
Sun Equatorial Horizontal Parallax	08.7"
Moon Right Ascension	22h56m36.4s
Moon Declination	-06°29'41.1"
Moon Semi-Diameter	16'12.2"
Moon Equatorial Horizontal Parallax	0°59'28.1"
ΔT	33.5 s

== Eclipse season ==
This eclipse is part of an eclipse season, a period, roughly every six months, when eclipses occur. Only two (or occasionally three) eclipse seasons occur each year, and each season lasts about 35 days and repeats just short of six months (173 days) later; thus two full eclipse seasons always occur each year. Either two or three eclipses happen each eclipse season. In the sequence below, each eclipse is separated by a fortnight.

Eclipse season of September 1960
September 5 Descending node (full moon)	September 20 Ascending node (new moon)
Total lunar eclipse Lunar Saros 127	Partial solar eclipse Solar Saros 153

== Related eclipses ==
=== Eclipses in 1960 ===
- A total lunar eclipse on March 13.
- A partial solar eclipse on March 27.
- A total lunar eclipse on September 5.
- A partial solar eclipse on September 20.

=== Metonic ===
- Preceded by: Lunar eclipse of November 18, 1956
- Followed by: Lunar eclipse of June 25, 1964

=== Tzolkinex ===
- Preceded by: Lunar eclipse of July 26, 1953
- Followed by: Lunar eclipse of October 18, 1967

=== Half-Saros ===
- Preceded by: Solar eclipse of September 1, 1951
- Followed by: Solar eclipse of September 11, 1969

=== Tritos ===
- Preceded by: Lunar eclipse of October 7, 1949
- Followed by: Lunar eclipse of August 6, 1971

=== Lunar Saros 127 ===
- Preceded by: Lunar eclipse of August 26, 1942
- Followed by: Lunar eclipse of September 16, 1978

=== Inex ===
- Preceded by: Lunar eclipse of September 26, 1931
- Followed by: Lunar eclipse of August 17, 1989

=== Triad ===
- Preceded by: Lunar eclipse of November 4, 1873
- Followed by: Lunar eclipse of July 7, 2047

=== Lunar eclipses of 1958–1962 ===
This eclipse is a member of a semester series. An eclipse in a semester series of lunar eclipses repeats approximately every 177 days and 4 hours (a semester) at alternating nodes of the Moon's orbit.

The lunar eclipses on May 3, 1958 (partial) and October 28, 1958 (penumbral) occur in the previous lunar year eclipse set, and the penumbral lunar eclipse on July 17, 1962 occurs in the next lunar year eclipse set.

Lunar eclipse series sets from 1958 to 1962
Ascending node				Descending node			
Saros	Date Viewing	Type Chart	Gamma	Saros	Date Viewing	Type Chart	Gamma
102	1958 Apr 04	Penumbral	−1.5381				
112	1959 Mar 24	Partial	−0.8757	117	1959 Sep 17	Penumbral	1.0296
122	1960 Mar 13	Total	−0.1799	127	1960 Sep 05	Total	0.2422
132	1961 Mar 02	Partial	0.5541	137	1961 Aug 26	Partial	−0.4895
142	1962 Feb 19	Penumbral	1.2512	147	1962 Aug 15	Penumbral	−1.2210

=== Saros 127 ===
This eclipse is a part of Saros series 127, repeating every 18 years, 11 days, and containing 72 events. The series started with a penumbral lunar eclipse on July 9, 1275. It contains partial eclipses from November 4, 1473 through May 18, 1780; total eclipses from May 29, 1798 through November 9, 2068; and a second set of partial eclipses from November 20, 2086 through June 17, 2429. The series ends at member 72 as a penumbral eclipse on September 2, 2555.

The longest duration of totality was produced by member 35 at 101 minutes, 46 seconds on July 23, 1888. All eclipses in this series occur at the Moon’s descending node of orbit.

Greatest	First			
The greatest eclipse of the series occurred on 1888 Jul 23, lasting 101 minutes, 46 seconds.	Penumbral	Partial	Total	Central
The greatest eclipse of the series occurred on 1888 Jul 23, lasting 101 minutes, 46 seconds.	1275 Jul 09	1473 Nov 04	1798 May 29	1834 Jun 21
The greatest eclipse of the series occurred on 1888 Jul 23, lasting 101 minutes, 46 seconds.	Last			
The greatest eclipse of the series occurred on 1888 Jul 23, lasting 101 minutes, 46 seconds.	Central	Total	Partial	Penumbral
The greatest eclipse of the series occurred on 1888 Jul 23, lasting 101 minutes, 46 seconds.	1960 Sep 05	2068 Nov 09	2429 Jun 17	2555 Sep 02

Eclipses are tabulated in three columns; every third eclipse in the same column is one exeligmos apart, so they all cast shadows over approximately the same parts of the Earth.

Series members 31–52 occur between 1801 and 2200:
31	32	33
1816 Jun 10	1834 Jun 21	1852 Jul 01
34	35	36
1870 Jul 12	1888 Jul 23	1906 Aug 04
37	38	39
1924 Aug 14	1942 Aug 26	1960 Sep 05
40	41	42
1978 Sep 16	1996 Sep 27	2014 Oct 08
43	44	45
2032 Oct 18	2050 Oct 30	2068 Nov 09
46	47	48
2086 Nov 20	2104 Dec 02	2122 Dec 13
49	50	51
2140 Dec 23	2159 Jan 04	2177 Jan 14
52
2195 Jan 26

=== Tritos series ===
This eclipse is a part of a tritos cycle, repeating at alternating nodes every 135 synodic months (≈ 3986.63 days, or 11 years minus 1 month). Their appearance and longitude are irregular due to a lack of synchronization with the anomalistic month (period of perigee), but groupings of 3 tritos cycles (≈ 33 years minus 3 months) come close (≈ 434.044 anomalistic months), so eclipses are similar in these groupings.

Series members between 1801 and 2200
1807 Nov 15 (Saros 113)	1818 Oct 14 (Saros 114)	1829 Sep 13 (Saros 115)	1840 Aug 13 (Saros 116)	1851 Jul 13 (Saros 117)
1862 Jun 12 (Saros 118)	1873 May 12 (Saros 119)	1884 Apr 10 (Saros 120)	1895 Mar 11 (Saros 121)	1906 Feb 09 (Saros 122)
1917 Jan 08 (Saros 123)	1927 Dec 08 (Saros 124)	1938 Nov 07 (Saros 125)	1949 Oct 07 (Saros 126)	1960 Sep 05 (Saros 127)
1971 Aug 06 (Saros 128)	1982 Jul 06 (Saros 129)	1993 Jun 04 (Saros 130)	2004 May 04 (Saros 131)	2015 Apr 04 (Saros 132)
2026 Mar 03 (Saros 133)	2037 Jan 31 (Saros 134)	2048 Jan 01 (Saros 135)	2058 Nov 30 (Saros 136)	2069 Oct 30 (Saros 137)
2080 Sep 29 (Saros 138)	2091 Aug 29 (Saros 139)	2102 Jul 30 (Saros 140)	2113 Jun 29 (Saros 141)	2124 May 28 (Saros 142)
2135 Apr 28 (Saros 143)	2146 Mar 28 (Saros 144)	2157 Feb 24 (Saros 145)	2168 Jan 24 (Saros 146)	2178 Dec 24 (Saros 147)
2189 Nov 22 (Saros 148)	2200 Oct 23 (Saros 149)			

=== Inex series ===
This eclipse is a part of the long period inex cycle, repeating at alternating nodes, every 358 synodic months (≈ 10,571.95 days, or 29 years minus 20 days). Their appearance and longitude are irregular due to a lack of synchronization with the anomalistic month (period of perigee). However, groupings of 3 inex cycles (≈ 87 years minus 2 months) comes close (≈ 1,151.02 anomalistic months), so eclipses are similar in these groupings.

Series members between 1801 and 2200
1815 Dec 16 (Saros 122)	1844 Nov 24 (Saros 123)	1873 Nov 04 (Saros 124)
1902 Oct 17 (Saros 125)	1931 Sep 26 (Saros 126)	1960 Sep 05 (Saros 127)
1989 Aug 17 (Saros 128)	2018 Jul 27 (Saros 129)	2047 Jul 07 (Saros 130)
2076 Jun 17 (Saros 131)	2105 May 28 (Saros 132)	2134 May 08 (Saros 133)
2163 Apr 19 (Saros 134)	2192 Mar 28 (Saros 135)	

=== Half-Saros cycle ===
A lunar eclipse will be preceded and followed by solar eclipses by 9 years and 5.5 days (a half saros). This lunar eclipse is related to two total solar eclipses of Solar Saros 134.

September 1, 1951	September 11, 1969

== See also ==
- List of lunar eclipses
- List of 20th-century lunar eclipses
