= October 1985 lunar eclipse =

Total lunar eclipse (October 28, 1985)

- Total eclipse
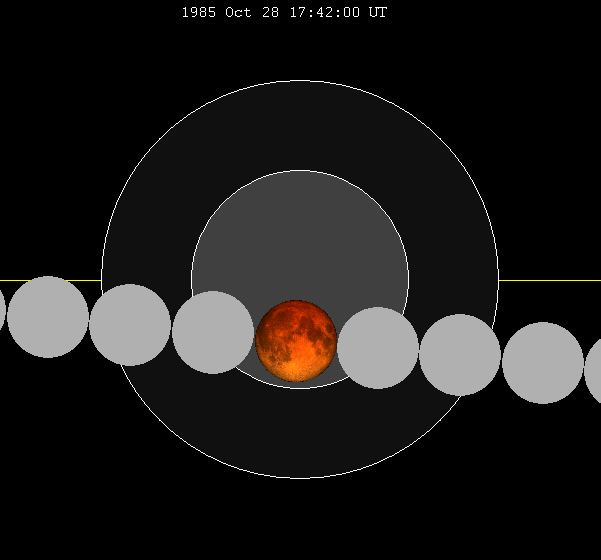
- The Moon's hourly motion shown right to left
- Date: October 28, 1985
- Gamma: −0.4022
- Magnitude: 1.0736
- Saros cycle: 126 (44 of 72)
- Totality: 43 minutes, 52 seconds
- Partiality: 214 minutes, 57 seconds
- Penumbral: 365 minutes, 3 seconds
Contacts (UTC)
- P1: 14:39:51
- U1: 15:54:53
- U2: 17:20:26
- Greatest: 17:42:22
- U3: 18:04:18
- U4: 19:29:50
- P4: 20:44:54

A total lunar eclipse occurred at the Moon’s ascending node of orbit on Monday, October 28, 1985, with an umbral magnitude of 1.0736. A lunar eclipse occurs when the Moon moves into the Earth's shadow, causing the Moon to be darkened. A total lunar eclipse occurs when the Moon's near side entirely passes into the Earth's umbral shadow. Unlike a solar eclipse, which can only be viewed from a relatively small area of the world, a lunar eclipse may be viewed from anywhere on the night side of Earth. A total lunar eclipse can last up to nearly two hours, while a total solar eclipse lasts only a few minutes at any given place, because the Moon's shadow is smaller. Occurring about 1.2 days before apogee (on October 29, 1985, at 21:50 UTC), the Moon's apparent diameter was smaller.

This lunar eclipse was the second of a tetrad, with four total lunar eclipses in series, the others being on May 4, 1985; April 24, 1986; and October 17, 1986.

== Visibility ==
The eclipse was completely visible over northern Europe, Asia, and western Australia, seen rising over Africa and much of Europe and setting over eastern Australia, northwestern North America, and the central Pacific Ocean.

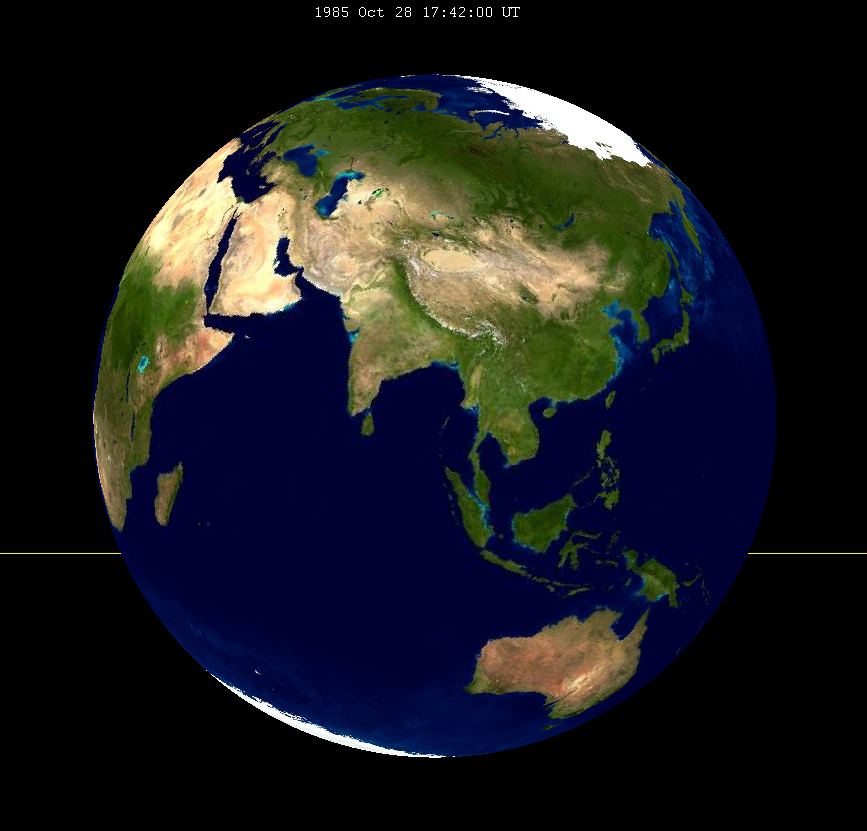
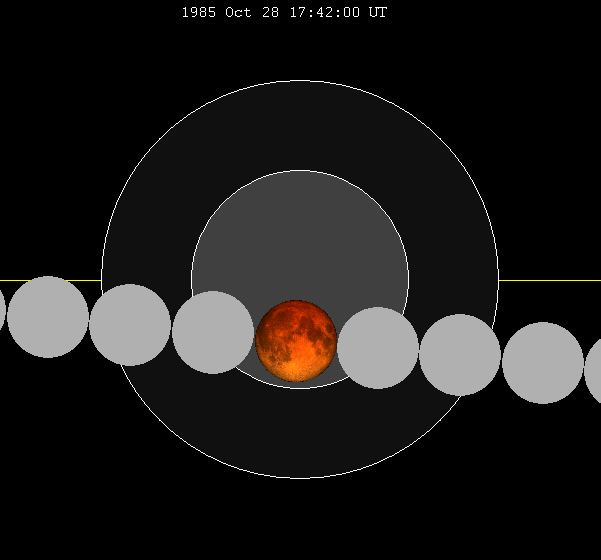

== Eclipse details ==
Shown below is a table displaying details about this particular solar eclipse. It describes various parameters pertaining to this eclipse.

October 28, 1985 Lunar Eclipse Parameters
Parameter	Value
Penumbral Magnitude	2.16733
Umbral Magnitude	1.07357
Gamma	−0.40218
Sun Right Ascension	14h11m49.8s
Sun Declination	-13°16'24.9"
Sun Semi-Diameter	16'06.1"
Sun Equatorial Horizontal Parallax	08.9"
Moon Right Ascension	02h12m27.9s
Moon Declination	+12°56'45.9"
Moon Semi-Diameter	14'43.3"
Moon Equatorial Horizontal Parallax	0°54'01.6"
ΔT	54.8 s

== Eclipse season ==
This eclipse is part of an eclipse season, a period, roughly every six months, when eclipses occur. Only two (or occasionally three) eclipse seasons occur each year, and each season lasts about 35 days and repeats just short of six months (173 days) later; thus two full eclipse seasons always occur each year. Either two or three eclipses happen each eclipse season. In the sequence below, each eclipse is separated by a fortnight.

Eclipse season of October–November 1985
October 28 Ascending node (full moon)	November 12 Descending node (new moon)
Total lunar eclipse Lunar Saros 126	Total solar eclipse Solar Saros 152

== Related eclipses ==
=== Eclipses in 1985 ===
- A total lunar eclipse on May 4.
- A partial solar eclipse on May 19.
- A total lunar eclipse on October 28.
- A total solar eclipse on November 12.

=== Metonic ===
- Preceded by: Lunar eclipse of January 9, 1982
- Followed by: Lunar eclipse of August 17, 1989

=== Tzolkinex ===
- Preceded by: Lunar eclipse of September 16, 1978
- Followed by: Lunar eclipse of December 9, 1992

=== Half-Saros ===
- Preceded by: Solar eclipse of October 23, 1976
- Followed by: Solar eclipse of November 3, 1994

=== Tritos ===
- Preceded by: Lunar eclipse of November 29, 1974
- Followed by: Lunar eclipse of September 27, 1996

=== Lunar Saros 126 ===
- Preceded by: Lunar eclipse of October 18, 1967
- Followed by: Lunar eclipse of November 9, 2003

=== Inex ===
- Preceded by: Lunar eclipse of November 18, 1956
- Followed by: Lunar eclipse of October 8, 2014

=== Triad ===
- Preceded by: Lunar eclipse of December 27, 1898
- Followed by: Lunar eclipse of August 28, 2072

=== Lunar eclipses of 1984–1987 ===
This eclipse is a member of a semester series. An eclipse in a semester series of lunar eclipses repeats approximately every 177 days and 4 hours (a semester) at alternating nodes of the Moon's orbit.

The penumbral lunar eclipse on June 13, 1984 occurs in the previous lunar year eclipse set.

Lunar eclipse series sets from 1984 to 1987
Descending node				Ascending node			
Saros	Date Viewing	Type Chart	Gamma	Saros	Date Viewing	Type Chart	Gamma
111	1984 May 15	Penumbral	1.1131	116	1984 Nov 08	Penumbral	−1.0900
121	1985 May 04	Total	0.3520	126	1985 Oct 28	Total	−0.4022
131	1986 Apr 24	Total	−0.3683	136	1986 Oct 17	Total	0.3189
141	1987 Apr 14	Penumbral	−1.1364	146	1987 Oct 07	Penumbral	1.0189

=== Metonic series ===
The metonic cycle repeats nearly exactly every 19 years and represents a Saros cycle plus one lunar year. Because it occurs on the same calendar date, the Earth's shadow will in nearly the same location relative to the background stars.

Metonic events: May 4 and October 28
Descending node	Ascending node
1. 1966 May 4 - Penumbral (111); 2. 1985 May 4 - Total (121); 3. 2004 May 4 - Total (131); 4. 2023 May 5 - Penumbral (141)	1. 1966 Oct 29 - Penumbral (116); 2. 1985 Oct 28 - Total (126); 3. 2004 Oct 28 - Total (136); 4. 2023 Oct 28 - Partial (146); 5. 2042 Oct 28 - Penumbral (156)

=== Saros 126 ===
This eclipse is a part of Saros series 126, repeating every 18 years, 11 days, and containing 70 events. The series started with a penumbral lunar eclipse on July 18, 1228. It contains partial eclipses from March 24, 1625 through June 9, 1751; total eclipses from June 19, 1769 through November 9, 2003; and a second set of partial eclipses from November 19, 2021 through June 5, 2346. The series ends at member 70 as a penumbral eclipse on August 19, 2472.

The longest duration of totality was produced by member 36 at 106 minutes, 27 seconds on August 13, 1859. All eclipses in this series occur at the Moon’s ascending node of orbit.

Greatest	First			
The greatest eclipse of the series occurred on 1859 Aug 13, lasting 106 minutes, 27 seconds.	Penumbral	Partial	Total	Central
The greatest eclipse of the series occurred on 1859 Aug 13, lasting 106 minutes, 27 seconds.	1228 Jul 18	1625 Mar 24	1769 Jun 19	1805 Jul 11
The greatest eclipse of the series occurred on 1859 Aug 13, lasting 106 minutes, 27 seconds.	Last			
The greatest eclipse of the series occurred on 1859 Aug 13, lasting 106 minutes, 27 seconds.	Central	Total	Partial	Penumbral
The greatest eclipse of the series occurred on 1859 Aug 13, lasting 106 minutes, 27 seconds.	1931 Sep 26	2003 Nov 09	2346 Jun 05	2472 Aug 19

Eclipses are tabulated in three columns; every third eclipse in the same column is one exeligmos apart, so they all cast shadows over approximately the same parts of the Earth.

Series members 33–54 occur between 1801 and 2200:
33	34	35
1805 Jul 11	1823 Jul 23	1841 Aug 02
36	37	38
1859 Aug 13	1877 Aug 23	1895 Sep 04
39	40	41
1913 Sep 15	1931 Sep 26	1949 Oct 07
42	43	44
1967 Oct 18	1985 Oct 28	2003 Nov 09
45	46	47
2021 Nov 19	2039 Nov 30	2057 Dec 11
48	49	50
2075 Dec 22	2094 Jan 01	2112 Jan 14
51	52	53
2130 Jan 24	2148 Feb 04	2166 Feb 15
54
2184 Feb 26

=== Tritos series ===
This eclipse is a part of a tritos cycle, repeating at alternating nodes every 135 synodic months (≈ 3986.63 days, or 11 years minus 1 month). Their appearance and longitude are irregular due to a lack of synchronization with the anomalistic month (period of perigee), but groupings of 3 tritos cycles (≈ 33 years minus 3 months) come close (≈ 434.044 anomalistic months), so eclipses are similar in these groupings.

Series members between 1801 and 2200
1811 Mar 10 (Saros 110)	1822 Feb 06 (Saros 111)	1833 Jan 06 (Saros 112)	1843 Dec 07 (Saros 113)	1854 Nov 04 (Saros 114)
1865 Oct 04 (Saros 115)	1876 Sep 03 (Saros 116)	1887 Aug 03 (Saros 117)	1898 Jul 03 (Saros 118)	1909 Jun 04 (Saros 119)
1920 May 03 (Saros 120)	1931 Apr 02 (Saros 121)	1942 Mar 03 (Saros 122)	1953 Jan 29 (Saros 123)	1963 Dec 30 (Saros 124)
1974 Nov 29 (Saros 125)	1985 Oct 28 (Saros 126)	1996 Sep 27 (Saros 127)	2007 Aug 28 (Saros 128)	2018 Jul 27 (Saros 129)
2029 Jun 26 (Saros 130)	2040 May 26 (Saros 131)	2051 Apr 26 (Saros 132)	2062 Mar 25 (Saros 133)	2073 Feb 22 (Saros 134)
2084 Jan 22 (Saros 135)	2094 Dec 21 (Saros 136)	2105 Nov 21 (Saros 137)	2116 Oct 21 (Saros 138)	2127 Sep 20 (Saros 139)
2138 Aug 20 (Saros 140)	2149 Jul 20 (Saros 141)	2160 Jun 18 (Saros 142)	2171 May 19 (Saros 143)	2182 Apr 18 (Saros 144)
2193 Mar 17 (Saros 145)

=== Inex series ===
This eclipse is a part of the long period inex cycle, repeating at alternating nodes, every 358 synodic months (≈ 10,571.95 days, or 29 years minus 20 days). Their appearance and longitude are irregular due to a lack of synchronization with the anomalistic month (period of perigee). However, groupings of 3 inex cycles (≈ 87 years minus 2 months) comes close (≈ 1,151.02 anomalistic months), so eclipses are similar in these groupings.

Series members between 1801 and 2200
1812 Feb 27 (Saros 120)	1841 Feb 06 (Saros 121)	1870 Jan 17 (Saros 122)
1898 Dec 27 (Saros 123)	1927 Dec 08 (Saros 124)	1956 Nov 18 (Saros 125)
1985 Oct 28 (Saros 126)	2014 Oct 08 (Saros 127)	2043 Sep 19 (Saros 128)
2072 Aug 28 (Saros 129)	2101 Aug 09 (Saros 130)	2130 Jul 21 (Saros 131)
2159 Jun 30 (Saros 132)	2188 Jun 09 (Saros 133)	

=== Half-Saros cycle ===
A lunar eclipse will be preceded and followed by solar eclipses by 9 years and 5.5 days (a half saros). This lunar eclipse is related to two total solar eclipses of Solar Saros 133.

October 23, 1976	November 3, 1994

== See also ==
- List of lunar eclipses
- List of 20th-century lunar eclipses
