= Lunar Saros 127 =

Eclipse cycle of the moon

Member 42
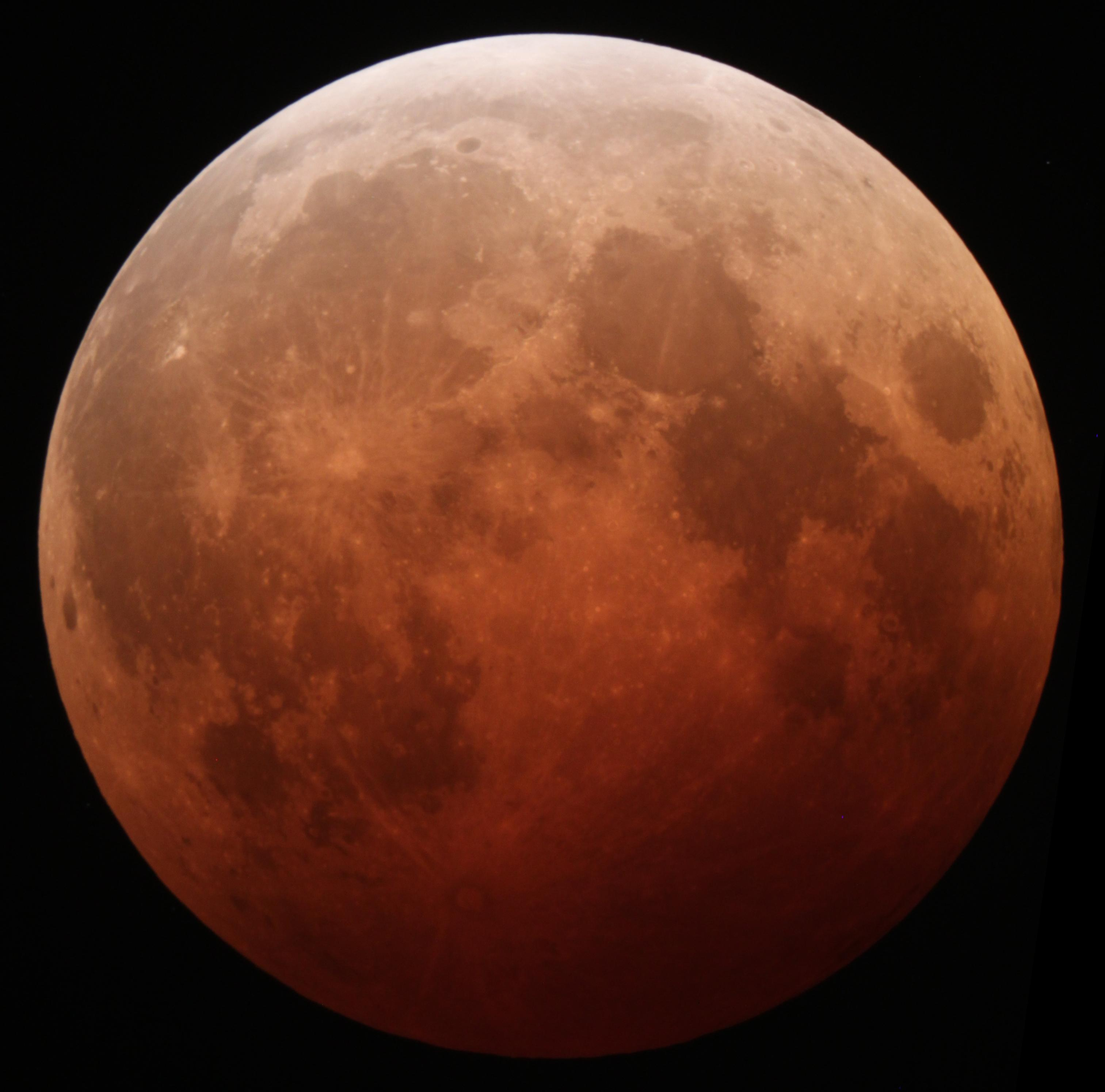
2014 Oct 8

Saros cycle series 127 for lunar eclipses occurs at the moon's descending node, repeats every 18 years 11 and 1/3 days. It contains 72 events. Solar saros 134 interleaves with this lunar saros with an event occurring every 9 years 5 days alternating between each saros series. It consisted with 10 penumbral eclipses, 21 partial eclipses, 11 total eclipses, 21 partial eclipses, and ends with 8 penumbral eclipses.

== Summary ==
Lunar saros series 127, repeating every 18 years and 11 days, has a total of 72 lunar eclipse events including 54 umbral lunar eclipses (38 partial lunar eclipses and 16 total lunar eclipses). Solar Saros 134 interleaves with this lunar saros with an event occurring every 9 years 5 days alternating between each saros series.

Greatest	First			
The greatest eclipse of the series occurred on 1888 Jul 23, lasting 102 minutes.	Penumbral	Partial	Total	Central
The greatest eclipse of the series occurred on 1888 Jul 23, lasting 102 minutes.	1275 Jul 09	1473 Nov 04	1798 May 29	1834 Jun 21
The greatest eclipse of the series occurred on 1888 Jul 23, lasting 102 minutes.	Last			
The greatest eclipse of the series occurred on 1888 Jul 23, lasting 102 minutes.	Central	Total	Partial	Penumbral
The greatest eclipse of the series occurred on 1888 Jul 23, lasting 102 minutes.	1960 Sep 05	2068 Nov 09	2429 Jun 17	2555 Sep 02

1901–2100
1906 Aug 04	1924 Aug 14	1942 Aug 26
1960 Sep 05	1978 Sep 16	1996 Sep 27
2014 Oct 08	2032 Oct 18	2050 Oct 30
2068 Nov 09

== List ==
Cat.	Saros	Mem	Date	Time UT (hr:mn)	Type	Gamma	Magnitude	Duration (min)			Contacts UT (hr:mn)						Chart
Cat.	Saros	Mem	Date	Greatest	Type	Gamma	Magnitude	Pen.	Par.	Tot.	P1	P4	U1	U2	U3	U4	Chart
07912	127	1	1275 Jul 09	14:25:50	Penumbral	-1.5731	-1.0631	25.0			14:13:20	14:38:20					
07957	127	2	1293 Jul 19	20:55:18	Penumbral	-1.4918	-0.9143	121.2			19:54:42	21:55:54					
08002	127	3	1311 Jul 31	3:29:38	Penumbral	-1.4136	-0.7713	165.8			2:06:44	4:52:32					
08045	127	4	1329 Aug 10	10:10:57	Penumbral	-1.3403	-0.6374	197.1			8:32:24	11:49:30					
08086	127	5	1347 Aug 21	16:59:59	Penumbral	-1.2725	-0.5137	220.8			15:09:35	18:50:23					
08127	127	6	1365 Aug 31	23:57:40	Penumbral	-1.2107	-0.4012	239.4			21:57:58	1:57:22					
08168	127	7	1383 Sep 12	7:04:45	Penumbral	-1.1559	-0.3013	253.9			4:57:48	9:11:42					
08209	127	8	1401 Sep 22	14:22:16	Penumbral	-1.1084	-0.2150	265.2			12:09:40	16:34:52					
08250	127	9	1419 Oct 03	21:50:05	Penumbral	-1.0687	-0.1428	273.8			19:33:11	0:06:59					
08292	127	10	1437 Oct 14	5:26:54	Penumbral	-1.0354	-0.0824	280.4			3:06:42	7:47:06					
08333	127	11	1455 Oct 25	13:13:24	Penumbral	-1.0093	-0.0348	285.1			10:50:51	15:35:57					
08374	127	12	1473 Nov 04	21:08:23	Partial	-0.9890	0.0023	288.5	11.7		18:44:08	23:32:38	21:02:32			21:14:14	
08413	127	13	1491 Nov 16	5:10:39	Partial	-0.9741	0.0298	290.6	41.7		2:45:21	7:35:57	4:49:48			5:31:30	
08453	127	14	1509 Nov 26	13:18:02	Partial	-0.9625	0.0514	291.9	54.5		10:52:05	15:43:59	12:50:47			13:45:17	
08494	127	15	1527 Dec 07	21:30:05	Partial	-0.9540	0.0678	292.6	62.3		19:03:47	23:56:23	20:58:56			22:01:14	
08535	127	16	1545 Dec 18	5:45:01	Partial	-0.9470	0.0818	292.9	68.2		3:18:34	8:11:28	5:10:55			6:19:07	
08578	127	17	1563 Dec 29	13:59:52	Partial	-0.9392	0.0975	293.1	74.1		11:33:19	16:26:25	13:22:49			14:36:55	
08621	127	18	1582 Jan 08	22:14:15	Partial	-0.9304	0.1155	293.5	80.2		19:47:30	0:41:00	21:34:09			22:54:21	
08665	127	19	1600 Jan 30	6:25:29	Partial	-0.9183	0.1399	294.2	87.7		3:58:23	8:52:35	5:41:38			7:09:20	
08710	127	20	1618 Feb 09	14:33:24	Partial	-0.9027	0.1709	295.4	96.3		12:05:42	17:01:06	13:45:15			15:21:33	
08754	127	21	1636 Feb 20	22:34:50	Partial	-0.8810	0.2135	297.3	106.7		20:06:11	1:03:29	21:41:29			23:28:11	
08798	127	22	1654 Mar 03	6:31:30	Partial	-0.8544	0.2650	299.8	117.6		4:01:36	9:01:24	5:32:42			7:30:18	
08843	127	23	1672 Mar 13	14:20:48	Partial	-0.8210	0.3293	303.0	129.5		11:49:18	16:52:18	13:16:03			15:25:33	
08889	127	24	1690 Mar 24	22:03:03	Partial	-0.7809	0.4062	306.7	141.7		19:29:42	0:36:24	20:52:12			23:13:54	
08935	127	25	1708 Apr 05	5:37:46	Partial	-0.7337	0.4959	310.9	154.0		3:02:19	8:13:13	4:20:46			6:54:46	
08982	127	26	1726 Apr 16	13:06:31	Partial	-0.6806	0.5966	315.2	165.7		10:28:55	15:44:07	11:43:40			14:29:22	
09028	127	27	1744 Apr 26	20:29:07	Partial	-0.6212	0.7086	319.6	176.8		17:49:19	23:08:55	19:00:43			21:57:31	
09075	127	28	1762 May 8	3:45:37	Partial	-0.5557	0.8317	323.8	186.9		1:03:43	6:27:31	2:12:10			5:19:04	
09121	127	29	1780 May 18	10:58:18	Partial	-0.4862	0.9620	327.5	195.8		8:14:33	13:42:03	9:20:24			12:36:12	
09166	127	30	1798 May 29	18:07:26	Total	-0.4129	1.0990	330.7	203.4	48.0	15:22:05	20:52:47	16:25:44	17:43:26	18:31:26	19:49:08	
09211	127	31	1816 Jun 10	1:14:25	Total	-0.3368	1.2410	333.2	209.5	71.3	22:27:49	4:01:01	23:29:40	0:38:46	1:50:04	2:59:10	
09257	127	32	1834 Jun 21	8:19:45	Total	-0.2583	1.3871	335.0	214.2	85.6	5:32:15	11:07:15	6:32:39	7:36:57	9:02:33	10:06:51	
09304	127	33	1852 Jul 01	15:26:13	Total	-0.1799	1.5330	335.9	217.4	94.6	12:38:16	18:14:10	13:37:31	14:38:55	16:13:31	17:14:55	
09348	127	34	1870 Jul 12	22:34:23	Total	-0.1023	1.6769	336.0	219.1	99.7	19:46:23	1:22:23	20:44:50	21:44:32	23:24:14	0:23:56	
09391	127	35	1888 Jul 23	5:44:47	Total	-0.0256	1.8189	335.3	219.5	101.8	2:57:08	8:32:26	3:55:02	4:53:53	6:35:41	7:34:32	
09434	127	36	1906 Aug 04	13:00:10	Total	0.0477	1.7793	333.9	218.7	101.2	10:13:13	15:47:07	11:10:49	12:09:34	13:50:46	14:49:31	
09476	127	37	1924 Aug 14	20:20:30	Total	0.1175	1.6519	332.0	216.9	98.2	17:34:30	23:06:30	18:32:03	19:31:24	21:09:36	22:08:57	
09518	127	38	1942 Aug 26	3:48:25	Total	0.1818	1.5344	329.5	214.2	93.4	1:03:40	6:33:10	2:01:19	3:01:43	4:35:07	5:35:31	
09559	127	39	1960 Sep 05	11:21:51	Total	0.2422	1.4239	326.7	210.8	86.7	8:38:30	14:05:12	9:36:27	10:38:30	12:05:12	13:07:15	
09600	127	40	1978 Sep 16	19:05:01	Total	0.2951	1.3268	323.8	207.2	78.6	16:23:07	21:46:55	17:21:25	18:25:43	19:44:19	20:48:37	
09641	127	41	1996 Sep 27	2:55:24	Total	0.3426	1.2395	320.9	203.3	69.2	0:14:57	5:35:51	1:13:45	2:20:48	3:30:00	4:37:03	
09683	127	42	2014 Oct 08	10:55:44	Total	0.3826	1.1659	318.1	199.5	58.8	8:16:41	13:34:47	9:15:59	10:26:20	11:25:08	12:35:29	
09724	127	43	2032 Oct 18	19:03:40	Total	0.4169	1.1028	315.4	195.9	47.1	16:25:58	21:41:22	17:25:43	18:40:07	19:27:13	20:41:37	
09764	127	44	2050 Oct 30	3:21:47	Total	0.4435	1.0538	313.1	192.9	34.5	0:45:14	5:58:20	1:45:20	3:04:32	3:39:02	4:58:14	
09805	127	45	2068 Nov 09	11:47:00	Total	0.4645	1.0149	311.2	190.2	18.4	9:11:24	14:22:36	10:11:54	11:37:48	11:56:12	13:22:06	
09846	127	46	2086 Nov 20	20:19:42	Partial	0.4799	0.9865	309.5	188.1		17:44:57	22:54:27	18:45:39			21:53:45	
09888	127	47	2104 Dec 02	4:58:11	Partial	0.4910	0.9661	308.2	186.5		2:24:05	7:32:17	3:24:56			6:31:26	
09930	127	48	2122 Dec 13	13:42:41	Partial	0.4979	0.9536	307.1	185.4		11:09:08	16:16:14	12:09:59			15:15:23	
09973	127	49	2140 Dec 23	22:29:48	Partial	0.5028	0.9450	306.2	184.6		19:56:42	1:02:54	20:57:30			0:02:06	
10017	127	50	2159 Jan 04	7:19:20	Partial	0.5061	0.9394	305.4	183.9		4:46:38	9:52:02	5:47:23			8:51:17	
10060	127	51	2177 Jan 14	16:08:55	Partial	0.5099	0.9333	304.6	183.3		13:36:37	18:41:13	14:37:16			17:40:34	
10103	127	52	2195 Jan 26	0:58:49	Partial	0.5139	0.9269	303.7	182.7		22:26:58	3:30:40	23:27:28			2:30:10	
10147	127	53	2213 Feb 06	9:44:33	Partial	0.5218	0.9137	302.6	181.6		7:13:15	12:15:51	8:13:45			11:15:21	
10191	127	54	2231 Feb 17	18:27:46	Partial	0.5321	0.8961	301.3	180.3		15:57:07	20:58:25	16:57:37			19:57:55	
10237	127	55	2249 Feb 28	3:04:45	Partial	0.5480	0.8685	299.5	178.2		0:35:00	5:34:30	1:35:39			4:33:51	
10283	127	56	2267 Mar 11	11:37:14	Partial	0.5679	0.8336	297.4	175.5		9:08:32	14:05:56	10:09:29			13:04:59	
10329	127	57	2285 Mar 21	20:01:07	Partial	0.5954	0.7847	294.6	171.7		17:33:49	22:28:25	18:35:16			21:26:58	
10375	127	58	2303 Apr 03	4:19:40	Partial	0.6276	0.7273	291.2	166.8		1:54:04	6:45:16	2:56:16			5:43:04	
10421	127	59	2321 Apr 13	12:29:34	Partial	0.6671	0.6562	287.1	160.3		10:06:01	14:53:07	11:09:25			13:49:43	
10467	127	60	2339 Apr 24	20:32:43	Partial	0.7125	0.5746	282.1	151.9		18:11:40	22:53:46	19:16:46			21:48:40	
10512	127	61	2357 May 5	4:27:44	Partial	0.7646	0.4802	275.9	140.9		2:09:47	6:45:41	3:17:17			5:38:11	
10557	127	62	2375 May 16	12:17:12	Partial	0.8213	0.3774	268.7	126.9		10:02:51	14:31:33	11:13:45			13:20:39	
10601	127	63	2393 May 26	20:00:14	Partial	0.8834	0.2643	260.2	108.0		17:50:08	22:10:20	19:06:14			20:54:14	
10646	127	64	2411 Jun 07	3:37:47	Partial	0.9498	0.1431	250.0	80.8		1:32:47	5:42:47	2:57:23			4:18:11	
10690	127	65	2429 Jun 17	11:11:33	Partial	1.0191	0.0164	238.3	27.8		9:12:24	13:10:42	10:57:39			11:25:27	
10734	127	66	2447 Jun 28	18:42:11	Penumbral	1.0906	-0.1147	224.6			16:49:53	20:34:29					
10777	127	67	2465 Jul 09	2:10:48	Penumbral	1.1635	-0.2489	208.7			0:26:27	3:55:09					
10819	127	68	2483 Jul 20	9:38:03	Penumbral	1.2373	-0.3848	190.1			8:03:00	11:13:06					
10860	127	69	2501 Jul 31	17:06:36	Penumbral	1.3097	-0.5184	168.6			15:42:18	18:30:54					
10901	127	70	2519 Aug 12	0:36:43	Penumbral	1.3801	-0.6489	143.1			23:25:10	1:48:16					
10941	127	71	2537 Aug 22	8:09:08	Penumbral	1.4483	-0.7756	111.1			7:13:35	9:04:41					
10983	127	72	2555 Sep 02	15:45:57	Penumbral	1.5126	-0.8952	65.5			15:13:12	16:18:42					

== See also ==
- List of lunar eclipses
  - List of Saros series for lunar eclipses
