= Solar Saros 134 =

Saros cycle series 134 for solar eclipses

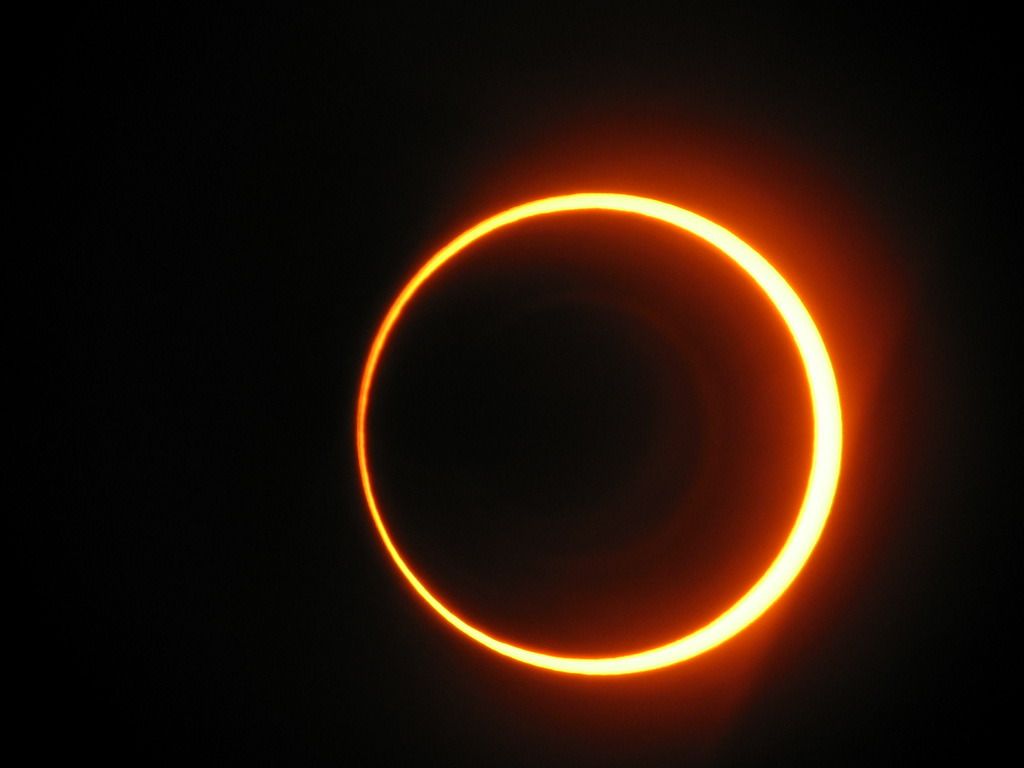
Annular solar eclipse on October 3, 2005 from Spain, saros 134, member 43

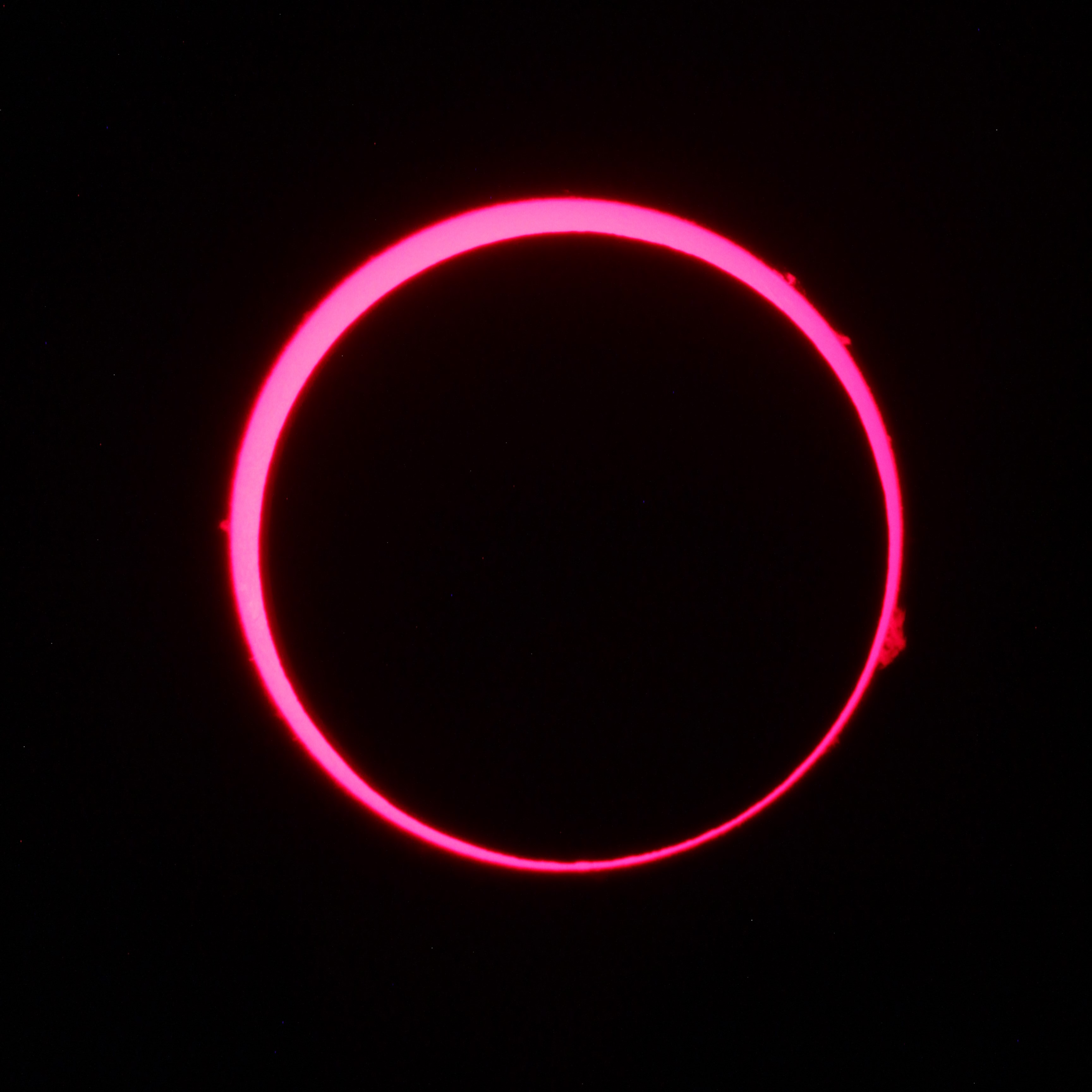
Annular solar eclipse on October 14, 2023 from New Mexico, saros 134, member 44

Historic saros cycle animation

Saros cycle series 134 for solar eclipses occurs at the Moon's descending node, repeating every 18 years, 11 days, containing 71 eclipses, 54 of which are umbral (8 total, 16 hybrid, and 30 annular). The first eclipse in the series was on 22 June 1248 and the last will be on 6 August 2510. The most recent was an annular eclipse on 14 October 2023 and the next will be an annular eclipse on 2041 October 25.

The longest totality was 1 minute 30 seconds on 9 October 1428 and the longest annular will be 10 minutes 55 seconds on 10 January 2168.

This series is linked to Lunar Saros 127.

== Umbral eclipses ==
Umbral eclipses (annular, total and hybrid) can be further classified as either: 1) Central (two limits), 2) Central (one limit) or 3) Non-Central (one limit). The statistical distribution of these classes in Saros series 134 appears in the following table.

Classification	Number	Percent
All Umbral eclipses	54	100.00%
Central (two limits)	53	98.15%
Central (one limit)	1	1.85%
Non-central (one limit)	0	0.00%

== All eclipses ==
Note: Dates are given in the Julian calendar prior to 15 October 1582, and in the Gregorian calendar after that.

Saros	Member	Date	Time (Greatest) UTC	Type	Location Lat, Long	Gamma	Mag.	Width (km)	Duration (min:sec)	Ref
134	1	June 22, 1248	19:09:36	Partial	65.2S 125.9W	−1.5159	0.0223			
134	2	July 4, 1266	2:38:30	Partial	64.3S 111.8E	−1.4464	0.1578			
134	3	July 14, 1284	10:08:18	Partial	63.4S 10.4W	−1.3779	0.2915			
134	4	July 25, 1302	17:42:30	Partial	62.7S 133.4W	−1.3129	0.4178			
134	5	August 5, 1320	1:20:21	Partial	62.1S 102.9E	−1.251	0.5375			
134	6	August 16, 1338	9:03:11	Partial	61.6S 21.9W	−1.1933	0.6482			
134	7	August 26, 1356	16:52:10	Partial	61.2S 148.1W	−1.141	0.7477			
134	8	September 7, 1374	0:48:07	Partial	61S 84E	−1.0949	0.8345			
134	9	September 17, 1392	8:51:03	Partial	61S 45.5W	−1.0548	0.9092			
134	10	September 28, 1410	17:00:48	Partial	61.1S 176.7W	−1.0206	0.9718			
134	11	October 9, 1428	1:18:10	Total (Note: No southern limit)	63S 61E	−0.993	1.0281	-	1m 30s	
134	12	October 20, 1446	9:42:45	Total	65.8S 56.8W	−0.9718	1.0258	386	1m 25s	
134	13	October 30, 1464	18:13:13	Total	68.9S 176E	−0.956	1.0225	267	1m 14s	
134	14	November 11, 1482	2:49:49	Total	72.5S 44E	−0.9457	1.0189	203	1m 3s	
134	15	November 21, 1500	11:30:31	Total	76.4S 91.4W	−0.9393	1.0156	159	0m 52s	
134	16	December 2, 1518	20:14:58	Total	80.4S 128.7E	−0.9365	1.0124	125	0m 41s	
134	17	December 13, 1536	4:59:20	Total	84.5S 17.2W	−0.9343	1.0098	97	0m 33s	
134	18	December 24, 1554	13:45:21	Total	87.5S 159.2E	−0.9341	1.0075	75	0m 25s	
134	19	January 3, 1573	22:28:35	Hybrid	85.9S 54.1W	−0.9328	1.0058	57	0m 20s	
134	20	January 25, 1591	7:09:22	Hybrid	81.9S 150.6E	−0.9298	1.0047	45	0m 16s	
134	21	February 4, 1609	15:43:43	Hybrid	77.3S 7.2E	−0.9224	1.0041	37	0m 15s	
134	22	February 16, 1627	0:13:31	Hybrid	72.3S 130.9W	−0.9119	1.004	34	0m 15s	
134	23	February 26, 1645	8:35:06	Hybrid	66.7S 94.3E	−0.8956	1.0043	34	0m 17s	
134	24	March 9, 1663	16:48:41	Hybrid	60.5S 37.1W	−0.8735	1.0049	35	0m 21s	
134	25	March 20, 1681	0:52:59	Hybrid	53.8S 165.3W	−0.8445	1.0057	37	0m 26s	
134	26	March 31, 1699	8:48:45	Hybrid	46.8S 69.7E	−0.8089	1.0065	38	0m 32s	
134	27	April 11, 1717	16:34:40	Hybrid	39.5S 52.1W	−0.766	1.0072	39	0m 39s	
134	28	April 23, 1735	0:11:36	Hybrid	32.2S 171W	−0.7164	1.0077	38	0m 44s	
134	29	May 3, 1753	7:39:40	Hybrid	24.9S 73E	−0.6601	1.0079	36	0m 48s	
134	30	May 14, 1771	15:00:02	Hybrid	17.8S 40.4W	−0.598	1.0076	33	0m 49s	
134	31	May 24, 1789	22:11:58	Hybrid	11S 151W	−0.5297	1.0068	28	0m 46s	
134	32	June 6, 1807	5:18:31	Hybrid	4.7S 100.4E	−0.4577	1.0055	21	0m 38s	
134	33	June 16, 1825	12:19:03	Hybrid	1N 6W	−0.3812	1.0036	13	0m 25s	
134	34	June 27, 1843	19:17:03	Hybrid	5.9N 111W	−0.3037	1.0011	4	0m 7s	
134	35	July 8, 1861	2:10:26	Annular	10N 145.8E	−0.2231	0.9979	7	0m 14s	
134	36	July 19, 1879	9:04:32	Annular	13N 42.9E	−0.1439	0.9942	20	0m 39s	
134	37	July 29, 1897	15:56:58	Annular	15.3N 59W	−0.064	0.9899	35	1m 5s	
134	38	August 10, 1915	22:52:25	Annular	16.4N 161.4W	0.0124	0.9853	52	1m 33s	
134	39	August 21, 1933	5:49:11	Annular	16.9N 95.9E	0.0869	0.9801	71	2m 4s	
134	40	September 1, 1951	12:51:51	Annular	16.5N 8.5W	0.1557	0.9747	91	2m 36s	
134	41	September 11, 1969	19:58:59	Annular	15.6N 114.1W	0.2201	0.969	114	3m 11s	
134	42	September 23, 1987	3:12:22	Annular	14.3N 138.4E	0.2787	0.9634	137	3m 49s	
134	43	October 3, 2005	10:32:47	Annular	12.9N 28.7E	0.3306	0.9576	162	4m 32s	
134	44	October 14, 2023	18:00:41	Annular	11.4N 83.1W	0.3753	0.952	187	5m 17s	
134	45	October 25, 2041	1:36:22	Annular	9.9N 162.9E	0.4133	0.9467	213	6m 7s	
134	46	November 5, 2059	9:18:15	Annular	8.7N 47.1E	0.4454	0.9417	238	7m 0s	
134	47	November 15, 2077	17:07:56	Annular	7.8N 70.8W	0.4705	0.9371	262	7m 54s	
134	48	November 27, 2095	1:02:57	Annular	7.2N 169.8E	0.4903	0.933	285	8m 47s	
134	49	December 8, 2113	9:03:27	Annular	7.1N 48.9E	0.5049	0.9296	304	9m 35s	
134	50	December 19, 2131	17:06:51	Annular	7.6N 72.8W	0.5165	0.9267	321	10m 14s	
134	51	December 30, 2149	1:13:04	Annular	8.6N 164.7E	0.5253	0.9245	334	10m 42s	
134	52	January 10, 2168	9:19:03	Annular	10.3N 42.1E	0.5337	0.923	344	10m 55s	
134	53	January 20, 2186	17:23:44	Annular	12.8N 80.3W	0.5426	0.9221	350	10m 53s	
134	54	February 2, 2204	1:25:26	Annular	16N 157.8E	0.5535	0.9218	353	10m 38s	
134	55	February 12, 2222	9:23:18	Annular	20N 36.7E	0.5669	0.922	355	10m 14s	
134	56	February 23, 2240	17:14:11	Annular	24.7N 83W	0.5859	0.9228	356	9m 41s	
134	57	March 6, 2258	0:58:23	Annular	30.2N 158.8E	0.6101	0.9239	359	9m 4s	
134	58	March 16, 2276	8:34:02	Annular	36.4N 42.3E	0.6411	0.9253	362	8m 23s	
134	59	March 27, 2294	16:02:23	Annular	43.2N 72.6W	0.6776	0.9269	370	7m 42s	
134	60	April 7, 2312	23:19:32	Annular	50.8N 174.7E	0.7231	0.9286	385	7m 0s	
134	61	April 19, 2330	6:29:25	Annular	59N 62.9E	0.7742	0.9302	412	6m 19s	
134	62	April 29, 2348	13:29:00	Annular	68.1N 48.8W	0.8338	0.9315	466	5m 40s	
134	63	May 10, 2366	20:22:08	Annular	77.9N 169.5W	0.8981	0.9323	583	5m 3s	
134	64	May 21, 2384	3:05:26	Annular	80.8N 0.8W	0.9701	0.9317	1115	4m 28s	
134	65	June 1, 2402	9:44:38	Partial	67.8N 135.9W	1.0452	0.8834			
134	66	June 11, 2420	16:17:02	Partial	66.8N 115.6E	1.1256	0.747			
134	67	June 22, 2438	22:46:47	Partial	65.8N 8.2E	1.2079	0.6068			
134	68	July 3, 2456	5:13:16	Partial	64.9N 98.1W	1.2925	0.4621			
134	69	July 14, 2474	11:40:30	Partial	64N 155.9E	1.3764	0.3182			
134	70	July 24, 2492	18:08:32	Partial	63.2N 49.8E	1.4594	0.1755			
134	71	August 6, 2510	0:38:56	Partial	62.6N 56.5W	1.5405	0.0362			
