= Umbra, penumbra and antumbra =

Distinct parts of a shadow

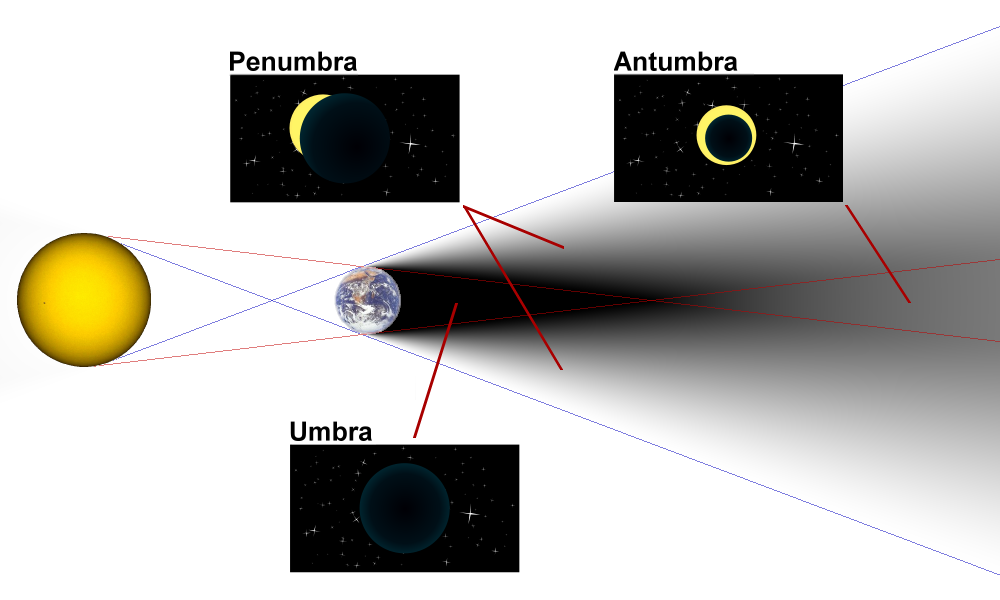
Umbra, penumbra and antumbra of Earth and images that could be seen at some points in these areas (Note: the relative size and distance of the bodies shown are not to scale.)

Umbra (A) and penumbra (B)

The umbra, penumbra and antumbra are three distinct parts of a shadow, made by any light source after impinging on an opaque object of lesser size. In cases of equal or larger impinging objects, only an umbra and penumbra are generated. Assuming no diffraction, for a collimated beam (such as a point source) of light, only the umbra is cast.

These phenomena are generally observed within solar systems, as the size of the stars within the system are larger than the orbiting satellites, hence these terms are most often used for the shadows cast by celestial bodies, though they are sometimes used to describe levels of darkness, such as in sunspots.

== Umbra (Main part of the Shadow) ==
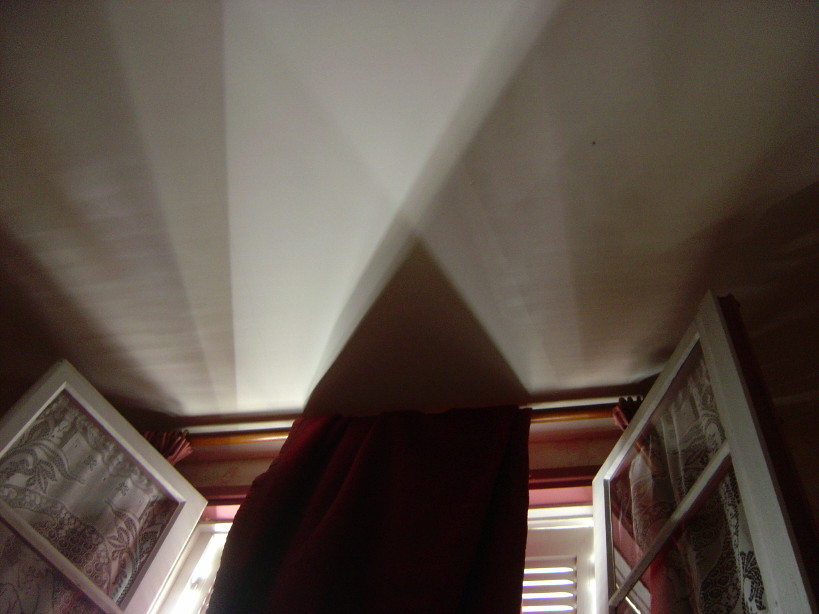
Umbra, penumbra and antumbra formed through windows and shutters

The umbra (Latin for 'shadow') is the innermost and darkest part of a shadow, where the light source is completely blocked by the occluding body. An observer within the umbra experiences a total occultation. The umbra of a round body occluding a round light source forms a right circular cone. When viewed from the cone's apex, the two bodies appear the same size.

The distance from the Moon to the apex of its umbra is roughly equal to that between the Moon and Earth: 384,402 km (238,856 mi). Since Earth's diameter is 3.7 times the Moon's, its umbra extends correspondingly farther: roughly 1.4 million km (870,000 mi).

== Penumbra (The lighter part of Shadow) ==
The penumbra (from Latin paene 'almost, nearly' and umbra 'shadow') is the region in which only a portion of the light source is obscured by the occluding body, and an observer in the penumbra experiences a partial eclipse.

An alternative definition is that the penumbra is the region where some or all of the light source is obscured (i.e., the umbra is a subset of the penumbra). For example, NASA's Navigation and Ancillary Information Facility defines that a body in the umbra is also within the penumbra.

Scale diagram of Earth's shadow, showing how the umbral cone extends beyond the orbit of the Moon (The Moon is indicated by the yellow dot.)

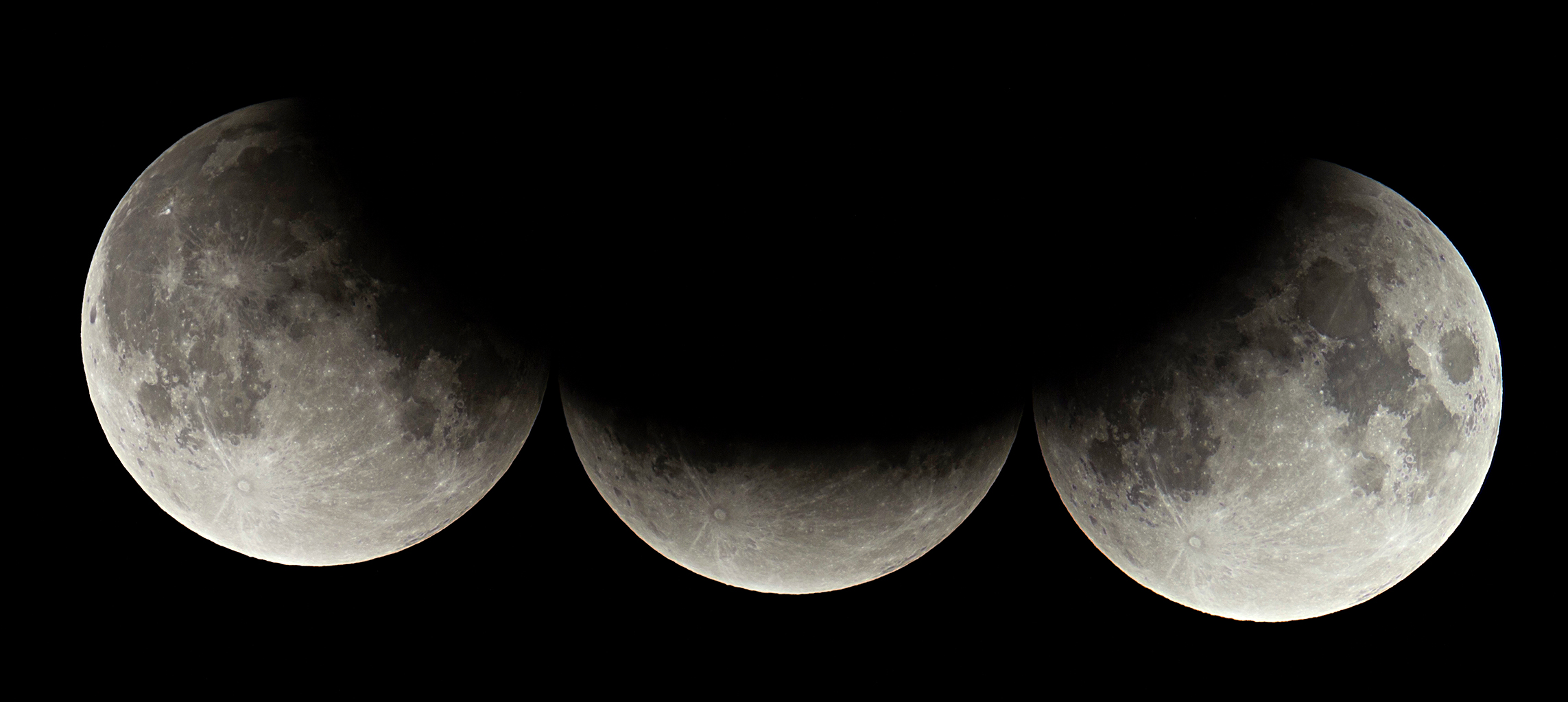
Earth's umbra, as seen during a partial lunar eclipse

== Antumbra ==
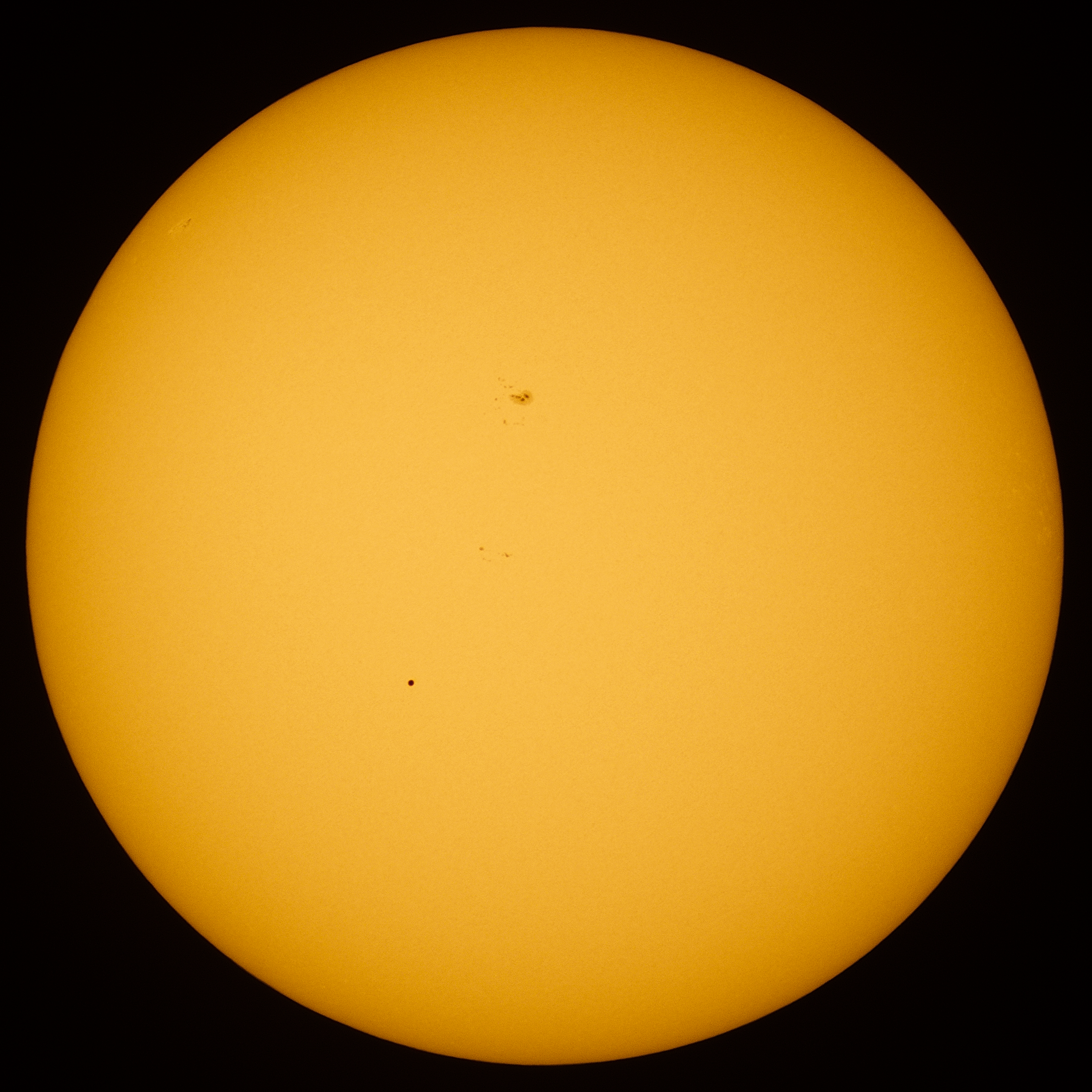
Transit of Mercury in front of the Sun, an extreme version of an annular eclipse. Mercury is visible as a black dot below and to the left of the center. The dark area above the center of the solar disk is a sunspot.

The antumbra (from Latin ante 'before' and umbra 'shadow') is the region from which the occluding body appears entirely within the disc of the light source. An observer in this region experiences an annular eclipse, in which a bright ring is visible around the eclipsing body. If the observer moves closer to the light source, the apparent size of the occluding body increases until it causes a full umbra.

== See also ==
- Antisolar point
- Earth's shadow
- Umbrella
