= August 2007 lunar eclipse =

Central lunar eclipse

- Total eclipse
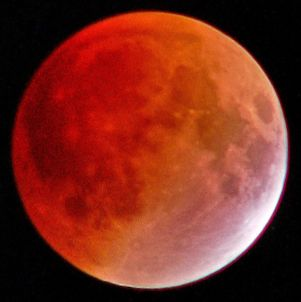
- The eclipse as viewed from Wollongong, Australia at 9:48 UTC, shortly before totality
- Date: August 28, 2007
- Gamma: −0.2145
- Magnitude: 1.4777
- Saros cycle: 128 (40 of 71)
- Totality: 90 minutes, 1 second
- Partiality: 212 minutes, 12 seconds
- Penumbral: 327 minutes, 17 seconds
Contacts (UTC)
- P1: 7:53:40
- U1: 8:51:16
- U2: 9:52:21
- Greatest: 10:37:21
- U3: 11:22:22
- U4: 12:23:28
- P4: 13:20:57

A total lunar eclipse occurred at the Moon’s ascending node of orbit on Tuesday, August 28, 2007, with an umbral magnitude of 1.4777. It was a central lunar eclipse, in which part of the Moon passed through the center of the Earth's shadow. A lunar eclipse occurs when the Moon moves into the Earth's shadow, causing the Moon to be darkened. A total lunar eclipse occurs when the Moon's near side entirely passes into the Earth's umbral shadow. Unlike a solar eclipse, which can only be viewed from a relatively small area of the world, a lunar eclipse may be viewed from anywhere on the night side of Earth. A total lunar eclipse can last up to nearly two hours, while a total solar eclipse lasts only a few minutes at any given place, because the Moon's shadow is smaller. Occurring about 2.4 days before perigee (on August 30, 2007, at 20:10 UTC), the Moon's apparent diameter was larger.

This was the most recent central lunar eclipse of Saros series 128 as well as the "longest and deepest lunar eclipse to be seen in 7 years". In the total lunar eclipse of July 16, 2000 the moon passed within two arc minutes of the center of the Earth's shadow. In comparison, this still very deep eclipse was off-center by over 12 minutes of arc. The next total lunar eclipse of a longer duration was on June 15, 2011.

== Visibility ==
Viewing from Oceania was favored for the eclipse, because at the moment of greatest eclipse (10:37:22 UTC), the Moon was at the zenith of French Polynesia. The Pacific regions of Canada and the continental United States (including all of Alaska) witnessed the whole event, along with most of eastern Australia, New Zealand and all the Pacific Island regions (except New Guinea), and the tip of the Chukchi Peninsula that includes the town of Uelen, Russia. The majority of the Americas observed an abbreviated eclipse, with moonset occurring at some time during the eclipse. Siberia, far eastern Russia, eastern South Asia, China, the rest of eastern and southeastern Asia, New Guinea, and the rest of Australia missed out on the beginning of the eclipse, because the eclipse occurred at or close to moonrise in those regions.

Luzon (except Visayas and Mindanao) in the Philippines, particularly Metro Manila, missed the rare eclipse entirely, due to clouds in the area due to the rainy season, which saddened many eclipse watchers in the area, but the eclipse was sighted by other amateur astronomers in other parts of the country as the lunar eclipse seen in clear skies. The eclipse was also missed in New Guinea, especially Port Moresby because of clouds. Greenland, Europe (including western Russia), Africa, western Asia, western Central Asia, and western South Asia missed the eclipse completely.

Hourly motion shown right to left	The Moon's hourly motion across the Earth's shadow in the constellation of Aquarius.
Visibility map

== Images ==
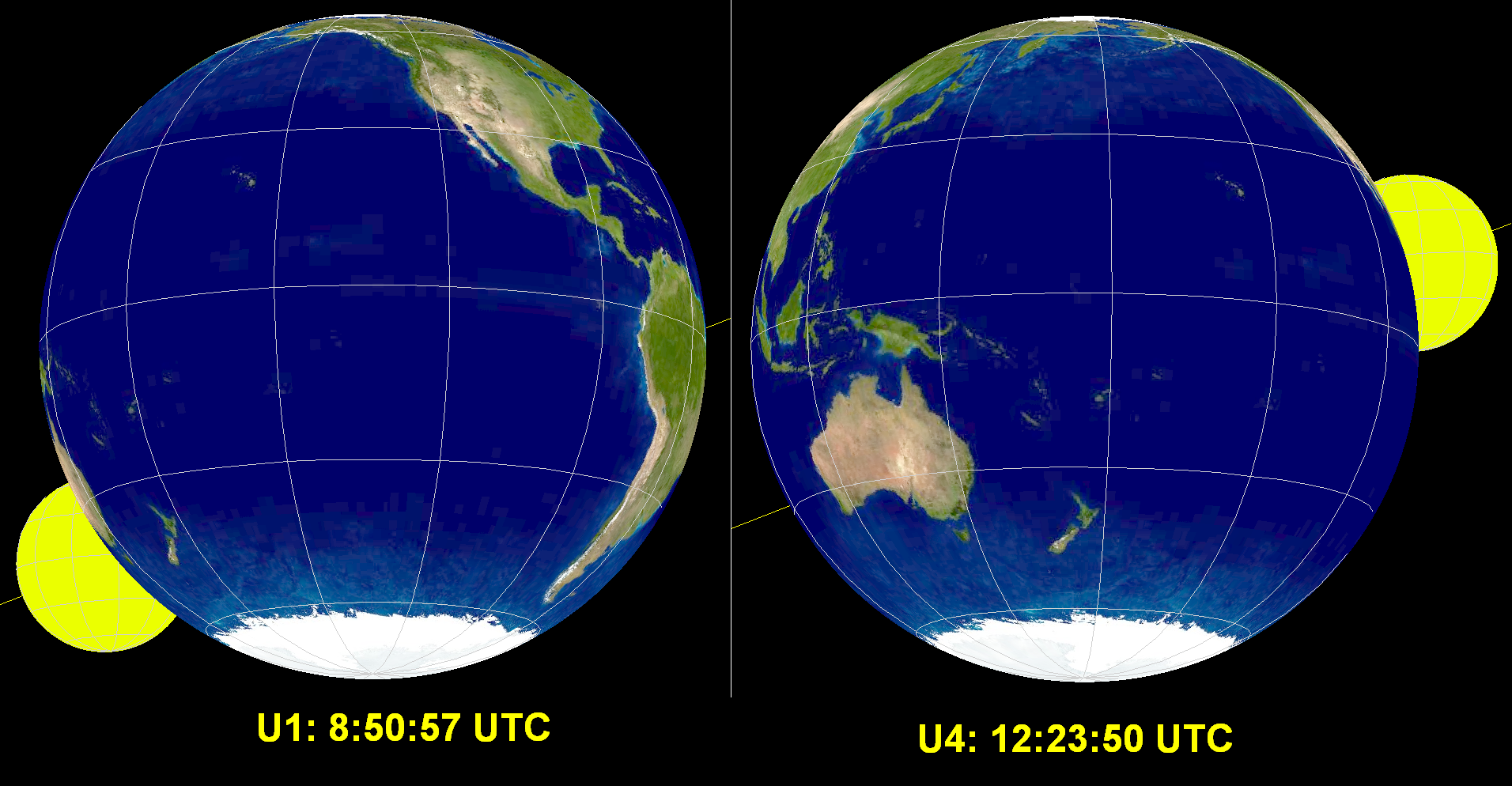

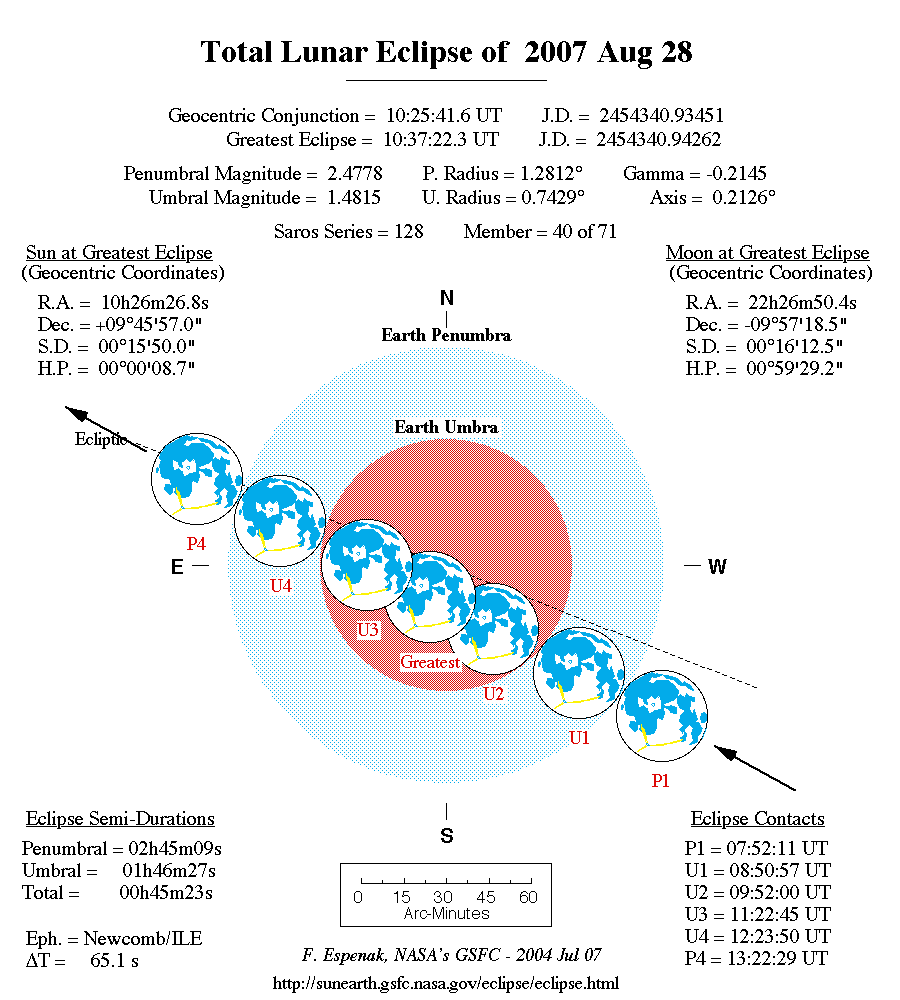
NASA chart of the eclipse

== Gallery ==
Collages
From the Oregon Coast.	From Swifts Creek, Australia. (3 minute intervals)
From Bakersfield, California.	From Swifts Creek, Australia. (3 minute intervals)

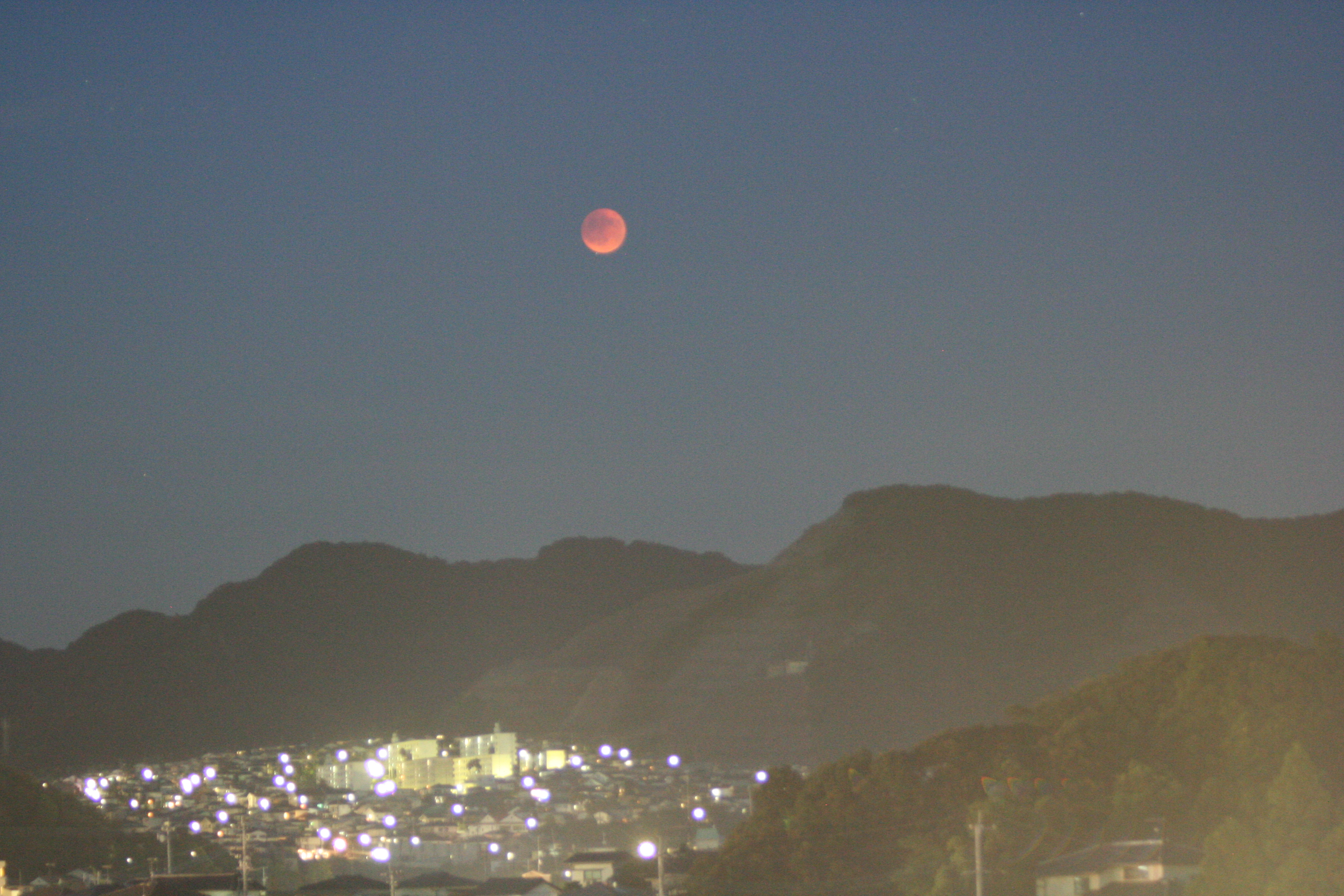
From Nagayo, Nagasaki, 10:33 UTC.

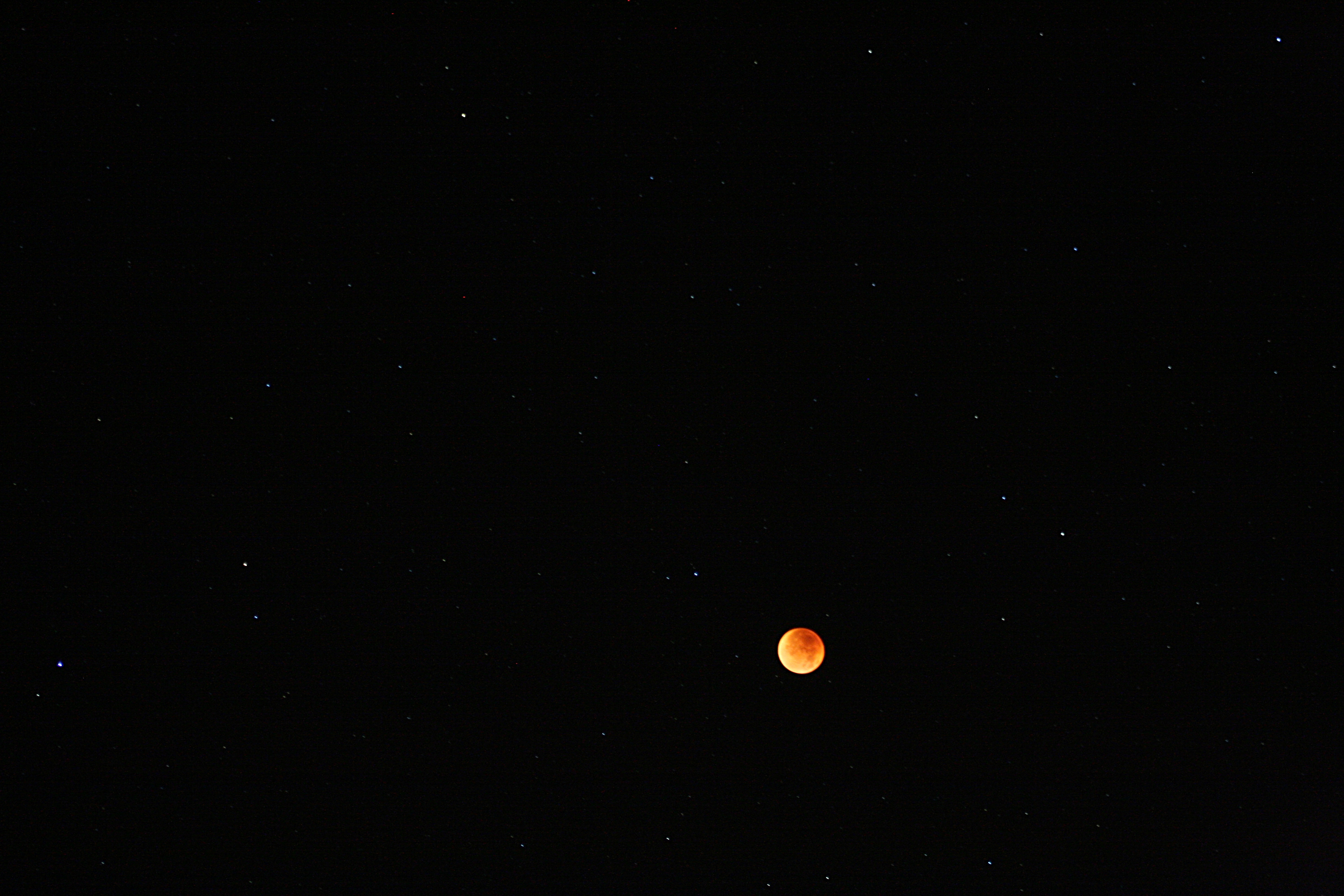
A wider angle shows stars around the moon.

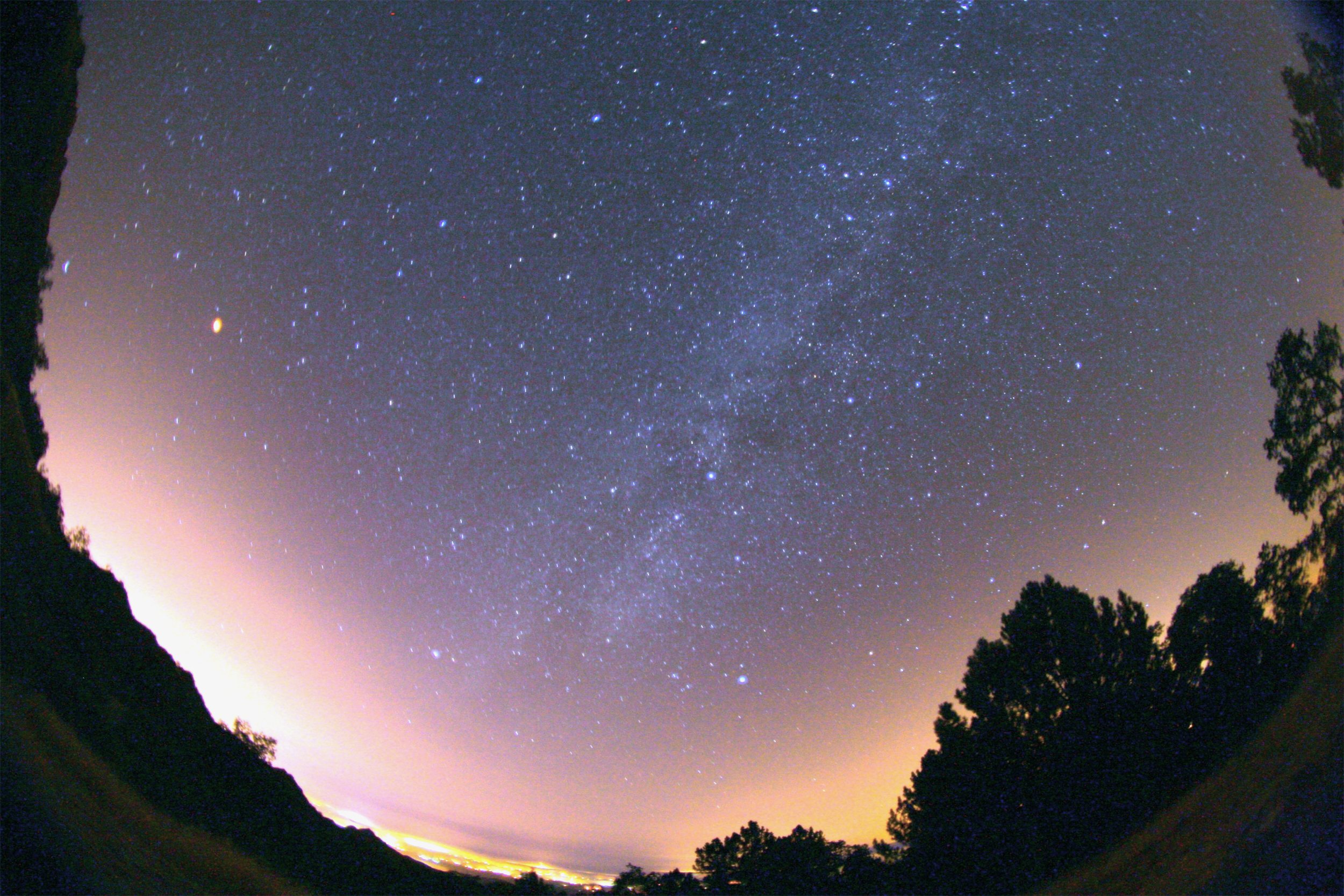
A full sky view (moon on left) shows the Milky Way (across the center), which is usually invisible under a full moon.

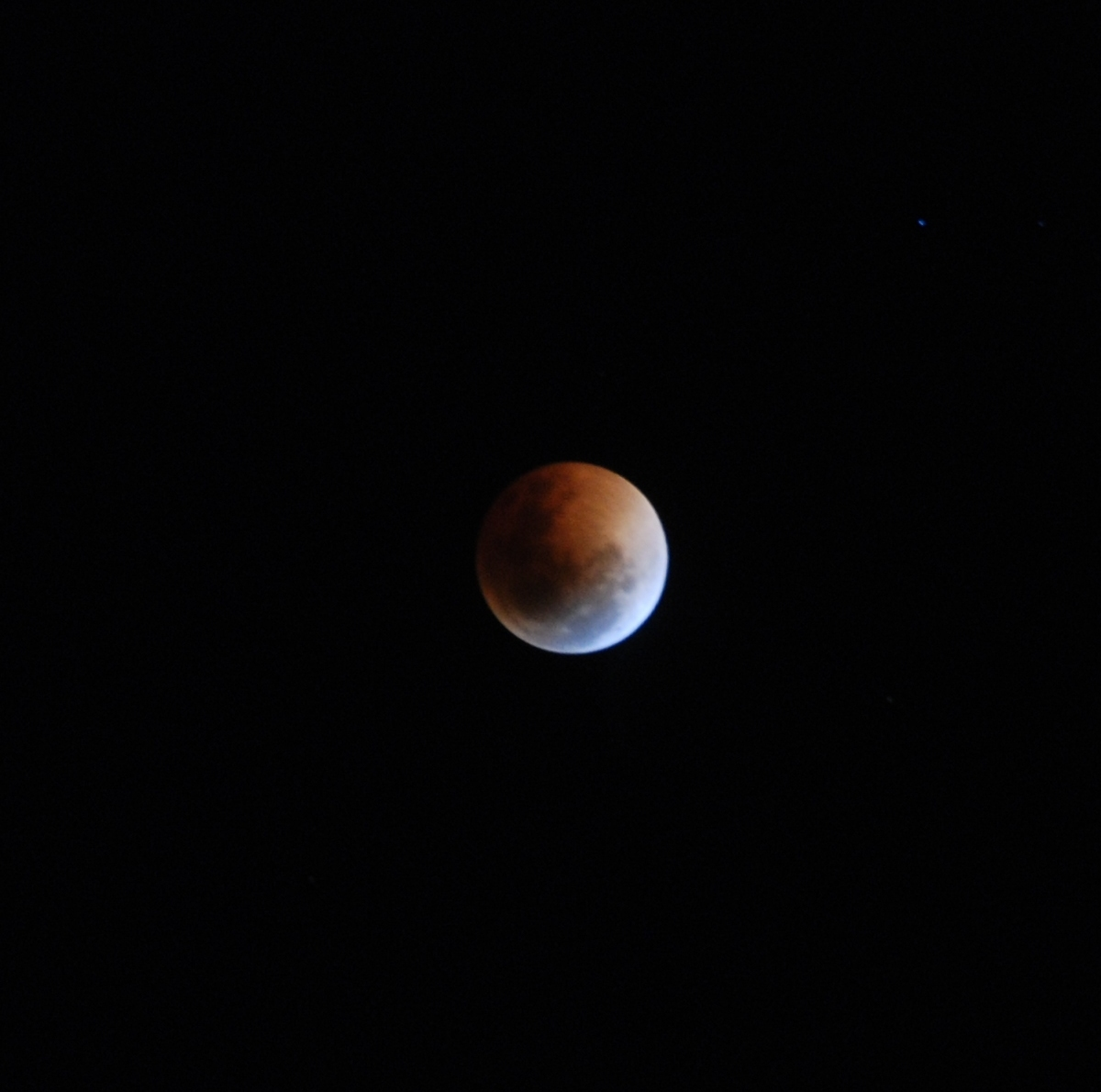
From Melbourne, Australia.

== Eclipse details ==
Shown below is a table displaying details about this particular lunar eclipse. It describes various parameters pertaining to this eclipse.

August 28, 2007 Lunar Eclipse Parameters
Parameter	Value
Penumbral Magnitude	2.45448
Umbral Magnitude	1.47769
Gamma	−0.21456
Sun Right Ascension	10h26m26.9s
Sun Declination	+09°45'56.7"
Sun Semi-Diameter	15'50.0"
Sun Equatorial Horizontal Parallax	08.7"
Moon Right Ascension	22h26m50.4s
Moon Declination	-09°57'18.5"
Moon Semi-Diameter	16'12.5"
Moon Equatorial Horizontal Parallax	0°59'29.2"
ΔT	65.4 s

== Eclipse season ==
This eclipse is part of an eclipse season, a period, roughly every six months, when eclipses occur. Only two (or occasionally three) eclipse seasons occur each year, and each season lasts about 35 days and repeats just short of six months (173 days) later; thus two full eclipse seasons always occur each year. Either two or three eclipses happen each eclipse season. In the sequence below, each eclipse is separated by a fortnight.

Eclipse season of August–September 2007
August 28 Ascending node (full moon)	September 11 Descending node (new moon)
Total lunar eclipse Lunar Saros 128	Partial solar eclipse Solar Saros 154

== Related eclipses ==
=== Eclipses in 2007 ===
- A total lunar eclipse on March 3.
- A partial solar eclipse on March 19.
- A total lunar eclipse on August 28.
- A partial solar eclipse on September 11.

=== Metonic ===
- Preceded by: Lunar eclipse of November 9, 2003
- Followed by: Lunar eclipse of June 15, 2011

=== Tzolkinex ===
- Preceded by: Lunar eclipse of July 16, 2000
- Followed by: Lunar eclipse of October 8, 2014

=== Half-Saros ===
- Preceded by: Solar eclipse of August 22, 1998
- Followed by: Solar eclipse of September 1, 2016

=== Tritos ===
- Preceded by: Lunar eclipse of September 27, 1996
- Followed by: Lunar eclipse of July 27, 2018

=== Lunar Saros 128 ===
- Preceded by: Lunar eclipse of August 17, 1989
- Followed by: Lunar eclipse of September 7, 2025

=== Inex ===
- Preceded by: Lunar eclipse of September 16, 1978
- Followed by: Lunar eclipse of August 7, 2036

=== Triad ===
- Preceded by: Lunar eclipse of October 27, 1920
- Followed by: Lunar eclipse of June 28, 2094

=== Lunar eclipses of 2006–2009 ===
This eclipse is a member of a semester series. An eclipse in a semester series of lunar eclipses repeats approximately every 177 days and 4 hours (a semester) at alternating nodes of the Moon's orbit.

The lunar eclipses on July 7, 2009 (penumbral) and December 31, 2009 (partial) occur in the next lunar year eclipse set.

Lunar eclipse series sets from 2006 to 2009
Descending node				Ascending node			
Saros	Date Viewing	Type Chart	Gamma	Saros	Date Viewing	Type Chart	Gamma
113	2006 Mar 14	Penumbral	1.0211	118	2006 Sep 7	Partial	−0.9262
123	2007 Mar 03	Total	0.3175	128	2007 Aug 28	Total	−0.2146
133	2008 Feb 21	Total	−0.3992	138	2008 Aug 16	Partial	0.5646
143	2009 Feb 09	Penumbral	−1.0640	148	2009 Aug 06	Penumbral	1.3572

=== Metonic series ===
The Metonic cycle repeats nearly exactly every 19 years and represents a Saros cycle plus one lunar year. Because it occurs on the same calendar date, the Earth's shadow will be in nearly the same location relative to the background stars.

1. 1988 Mar 03.675 – Partial (113); 2. 2007 Mar 03.972 – Total (123); 3. 2026 Mar 03.481 – Total (133); 4. 2045 Mar 03.320 – Penumbral (143)	1. 1988 Aug 27.461 – partial (118); 2. 2007 Aug 28.442 – total (128); 3. 2026 Aug 28.175 – partial (138); 4. 2045 Aug 27.578 – penumbral (148)

=== Saros 128 ===
This eclipse is a part of Saros series 128, repeating every 18 years, 11 days, and containing 71 events. The series started with a penumbral lunar eclipse on June 18, 1304. It contains partial eclipses from September 2, 1430 through May 11, 1827; total eclipses from May 21, 1845 through October 21, 2097; and a second set of partial eclipses from November 2, 2115 through May 17, 2440. The series ends at member 71 as a penumbral eclipse on August 2, 2566.

The longest duration of totality was produced by member 37 at 100 minutes, 43 seconds on July 26, 1953. All eclipses in this series occur at the Moon’s ascending node of orbit.

Greatest	First			
The greatest eclipse of the series occurred on 1953 Jul 26, lasting 100 minutes, 43 seconds.	Penumbral	Partial	Total	Central
The greatest eclipse of the series occurred on 1953 Jul 26, lasting 100 minutes, 43 seconds.	1304 Jun 18	1430 Sep 02	1845 May 21	1899 Jun 23
The greatest eclipse of the series occurred on 1953 Jul 26, lasting 100 minutes, 43 seconds.	Last			
The greatest eclipse of the series occurred on 1953 Jul 26, lasting 100 minutes, 43 seconds.	Central	Total	Partial	Penumbral
The greatest eclipse of the series occurred on 1953 Jul 26, lasting 100 minutes, 43 seconds.	2007 Aug 28	2097 Oct 21	2440 May 17	2566 Aug 02

Eclipses are tabulated in three columns; every third eclipse in the same column is one exeligmos apart, so they all cast shadows over approximately the same parts of the Earth.

Series members 29–50 occur between 1801 and 2200:
29	30	31
1809 Apr 30	1827 May 11	1845 May 21
32	33	34
1863 Jun 01	1881 Jun 12	1899 Jun 23
35	36	37
1917 Jul 04	1935 Jul 16	1953 Jul 26
38	39	40
1971 Aug 06	1989 Aug 17	2007 Aug 28
41	42	43
2025 Sep 07	2043 Sep 19	2061 Sep 29
44	45	46
2079 Oct 10	2097 Oct 21	2115 Nov 02
47	48	49
2133 Nov 12	2151 Nov 24	2169 Dec 04
50
2187 Dec 15

=== Tritos series ===
This eclipse is a part of a tritos cycle, repeating at alternating nodes every 135 synodic months (≈ 3986.63 days, or 11 years minus 1 month). Their appearance and longitude are irregular due to a lack of synchronization with the anomalistic month (period of perigee), but groupings of 3 tritos cycles (≈ 33 years minus 3 months) come close (≈ 434.044 anomalistic months), so eclipses are similar in these groupings.

Series members between 1801 and 2200
1811 Mar 10 (Saros 110)	1822 Feb 06 (Saros 111)	1833 Jan 06 (Saros 112)	1843 Dec 07 (Saros 113)	1854 Nov 04 (Saros 114)
1865 Oct 04 (Saros 115)	1876 Sep 03 (Saros 116)	1887 Aug 03 (Saros 117)	1898 Jul 03 (Saros 118)	1909 Jun 04 (Saros 119)
1920 May 03 (Saros 120)	1931 Apr 02 (Saros 121)	1942 Mar 03 (Saros 122)	1953 Jan 29 (Saros 123)	1963 Dec 30 (Saros 124)
1974 Nov 29 (Saros 125)	1985 Oct 28 (Saros 126)	1996 Sep 27 (Saros 127)	2007 Aug 28 (Saros 128)	2018 Jul 27 (Saros 129)
2029 Jun 26 (Saros 130)	2040 May 26 (Saros 131)	2051 Apr 26 (Saros 132)	2062 Mar 25 (Saros 133)	2073 Feb 22 (Saros 134)
2084 Jan 22 (Saros 135)	2094 Dec 21 (Saros 136)	2105 Nov 21 (Saros 137)	2116 Oct 21 (Saros 138)	2127 Sep 20 (Saros 139)
2138 Aug 20 (Saros 140)	2149 Jul 20 (Saros 141)	2160 Jun 18 (Saros 142)	2171 May 19 (Saros 143)	2182 Apr 18 (Saros 144)
2193 Mar 17 (Saros 145)

=== Inex series ===
This eclipse is a part of the long period inex cycle, repeating at alternating nodes, every 358 synodic months (≈ 10,571.95 days, or 29 years minus 20 days). Their appearance and longitude are irregular due to a lack of synchronization with the anomalistic month (period of perigee). However, groupings of 3 inex cycles (≈ 87 years minus 2 months) comes close (≈ 1,151.02 anomalistic months), so eclipses are similar in these groupings.

Series members between 1801 and 2200
1805 Jan 15 (Saros 121)	1833 Dec 26 (Saros 122)	1862 Dec 06 (Saros 123)
1891 Nov 16 (Saros 124)	1920 Oct 27 (Saros 125)	1949 Oct 07 (Saros 126)
1978 Sep 16 (Saros 127)	2007 Aug 28 (Saros 128)	2036 Aug 07 (Saros 129)
2065 Jul 17 (Saros 130)	2094 Jun 28 (Saros 131)	2123 Jun 09 (Saros 132)
2152 May 18 (Saros 133)	2181 Apr 29 (Saros 134)	

=== Half-Saros cycle ===
A lunar eclipse will be preceded and followed by solar eclipses by 9 years and 5.5 days (a half saros). This lunar eclipse is related to two annular solar eclipses of Solar Saros 135.

August 22, 1998	September 1, 2016

== See also ==
- List of lunar eclipses and List of 21st-century lunar eclipses
- File:2007-08-28 Lunar Eclipse Sketch.gif Chart
