= July 1953 lunar eclipse =

Total lunar eclipse July 26, 1953

- Total eclipse
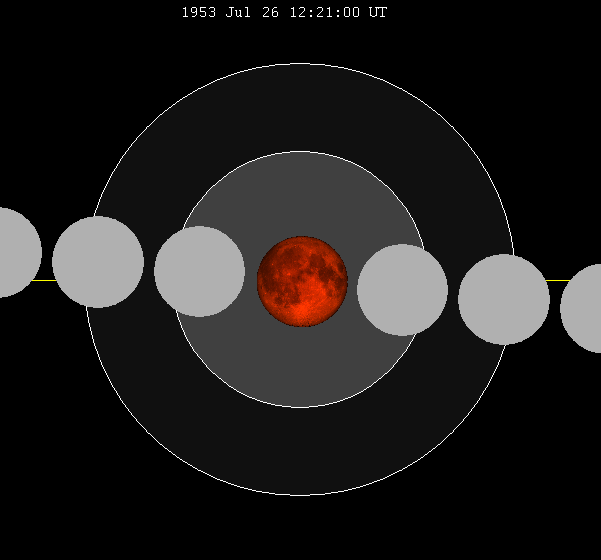
- The Moon's hourly motion shown right to left
- Date: July 26, 1953
- Gamma: −0.0071
- Magnitude: 1.8629
- Saros cycle: 128 (37 of 73)
- Totality: 100 minutes, 43 seconds
- Partiality: 215 minutes, 42 seconds
- Penumbral: 326 minutes, 29 seconds
Contacts (UTC)
- P1: 9:37:23
- U1: 10:32:49
- U2: 11:30:19
- Greatest: 12:20:40
- U3: 13:11:02
- U4: 14:08:31
- P4: 15:03:52

A total lunar eclipse occurred at the Moon’s ascending node of orbit on Sunday, July 26, 1953, with an umbral magnitude of 1.8629. It was a central lunar eclipse, in which part of the Moon passed through the center of the Earth's shadow. A lunar eclipse occurs when the Moon moves into the Earth's shadow, causing the Moon to be darkened. A total lunar eclipse occurs when the Moon's near side entirely passes into the Earth's umbral shadow. Unlike a solar eclipse, which can only be viewed from a relatively small area of the world, a lunar eclipse may be viewed from anywhere on the night side of Earth. A total lunar eclipse can last up to nearly two hours, while a total solar eclipse lasts only a few minutes at any given place, because the Moon's shadow is smaller. Occurring about 2.1 days before perigee (on July 28, 1953, at 14:45 UTC), the Moon's apparent diameter was larger.

With an umbral lunar eclipse magnitude of 1.8629, this was the largest lunar eclipse of the 20th century, larger than any since 1765 and until 2264. Gamma had a value of only −0.0071. Due to the Moon's relatively large size, totality lasted 100 minutes and 42 seconds unlike July 16, 2000, which lasted 106 minutes and 25 seconds, the longest since August 13, 1859 (which was only 3 seconds longer).

== Visibility ==
The eclipse was completely visible over Australia, Antarctica, and much of the Pacific Ocean, seen rising over much of Asia and setting over North and South America.

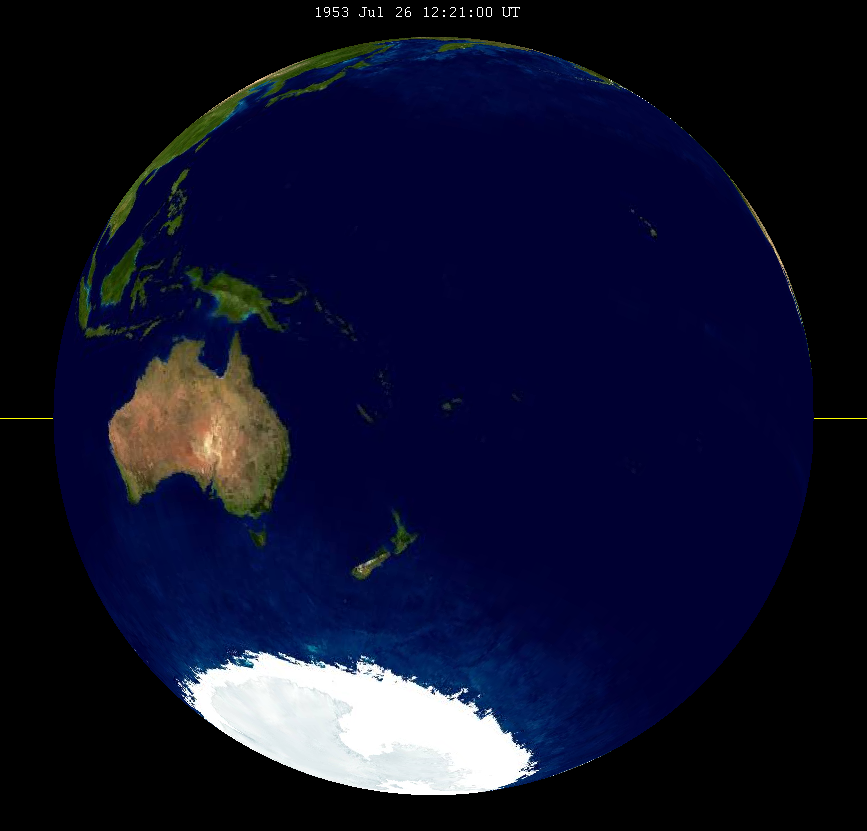
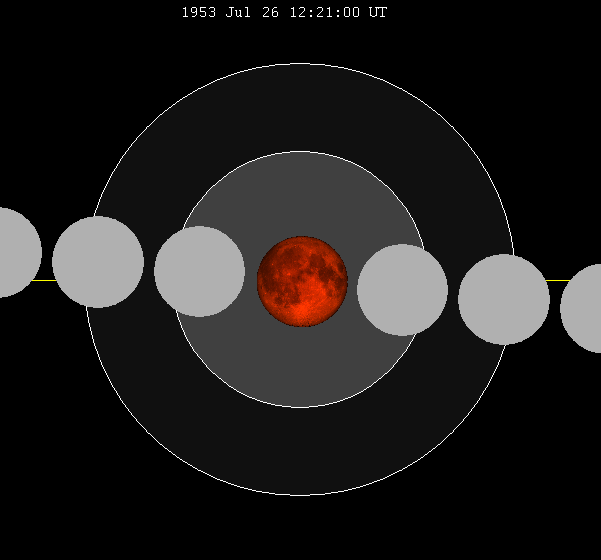

== Eclipse details ==
Shown below is a table displaying details about this particular solar eclipse. It describes various parameters pertaining to this eclipse.

July 26, 1953 Lunar Eclipse Parameters
| Parameter | Value |
|---|---|
| Penumbral Magnitude | 2.82655 |
| Umbral Magnitude | 1.86286 |
| Gamma | −0.00714 |
| Sun Right Ascension | 08h22m00.3s |
| Sun Declination | +19°26'49.2" |
| Sun Semi-Diameter | 15'45.0" |
| Sun Equatorial Horizontal Parallax | 08.7" |
| Moon Right Ascension | 20h22m00.9s |
| Moon Declination | -19°27'13.5" |
| Moon Semi-Diameter | 16'20.6" |
| Moon Equatorial Horizontal Parallax | 0°59'58.7" |
| ΔT | 30.5 s |

== Eclipse season ==
This eclipse is part of an eclipse season, a period, roughly every six months, when eclipses occur. Only two (or occasionally three) eclipse seasons occur each year, and each season lasts about 35 days and repeats just short of six months (173 days) later; thus two full eclipse seasons always occur each year. Either two or three eclipses happen each eclipse season. In the sequence below, each eclipse is separated by a fortnight.

Eclipse season of July–August 1953
| July 11 Descending node (new moon) | July 26 Ascending node (full moon) | August 9 Descending node (new moon) |
|---|---|---|
| Partial solar eclipse Solar Saros 116 | Total lunar eclipse Lunar Saros 128 | Partial solar eclipse Solar Saros 154 |

== Related eclipses ==
=== Eclipses in 1953 ===
- A total lunar eclipse on January 29.
- A partial solar eclipse on February 14.
- A partial solar eclipse on July 11.
- A total lunar eclipse on July 26.
- A partial solar eclipse on August 9.

=== Metonic ===
- Preceded by: Lunar eclipse of October 7, 1949
- Followed by: Lunar eclipse of May 13, 1957

=== Tzolkinex ===
- Preceded by: Lunar eclipse of June 14, 1946
- Followed by: Lunar eclipse of September 5, 1960

=== Half-Saros ===
- Preceded by: Solar eclipse of July 20, 1944
- Followed by: Solar eclipse of July 31, 1962

=== Tritos ===
- Preceded by: Lunar eclipse of August 26, 1942
- Followed by: Lunar eclipse of June 25, 1964

=== Lunar Saros 128 ===
- Preceded by: Lunar eclipse of July 16, 1935
- Followed by: Lunar eclipse of August 6, 1971

=== Inex ===
- Preceded by: Lunar eclipse of August 14, 1924
- Followed by: Lunar eclipse of July 6, 1982

=== Triad ===
- Preceded by: Lunar eclipse of September 24, 1866
- Followed by: Lunar eclipse of May 26, 2040

=== Lunar eclipses of 1951–1955 ===
This eclipse is a member of a semester series. An eclipse in a semester series of lunar eclipses repeats approximately every 177 days and 4 hours (a semester) at alternating nodes of the Moon's orbit.

The penumbral lunar eclipses on March 23, 1951 and September 15, 1951 occur in the previous lunar year eclipse set, and the lunar eclipses on June 5, 1955 (penumbral) and November 29, 1955 (partial) occur in the next lunar year eclipse set.

Lunar eclipse series sets from 1951 to 1955
| Descending node | | | | Ascending node | | | |
| Saros | Date Viewing | Type Chart | Gamma | Saros | Date Viewing | Type Chart | Gamma |
| 103 | 1951 Feb 21 | Penumbral | − | 108 | 1951 Aug 17 | Penumbral | −1.4828 |
| 113 | 1952 Feb 11 | Partial | 0.9416 | 118 | 1952 Aug 05 | Partial | −0.7384 |
| 123 | 1953 Jan 29 | Total | 0.2606 | 128 | 1953 Jul 26 | Total | −0.0071 |
| 133 | 1954 Jan 19 | Total | −0.4357 | 138 | 1954 Jul 16 | Partial | 0.7877 |
| 143 | 1955 Jan 08 | Penumbral | −1.0907 | | | | |

=== Saros 128 ===
This eclipse is a part of Saros series 128, repeating every 18 years, 11 days, and containing 71 events. The series started with a penumbral lunar eclipse on June 18, 1304. It contains partial eclipses from September 2, 1430 through May 11, 1827; total eclipses from May 21, 1845 through October 21, 2097; and a second set of partial eclipses from November 2, 2115 through May 17, 2440. The series ends at member 71 as a penumbral eclipse on August 2, 2566.

The longest duration of totality was produced by member 37 at 100 minutes, 43 seconds on July 26, 1953. All eclipses in this series occur at the Moon’s ascending node of orbit.

| Greatest | First | | | |
|---|---|---|---|---|
| The greatest eclipse of the series occurred on 1953 Jul 26, lasting 100 minutes, 43 seconds. | Penumbral | Partial | Total | Central |
| The greatest eclipse of the series occurred on 1953 Jul 26, lasting 100 minutes, 43 seconds. | 1304 Jun 18 | 1430 Sep 02 | 1845 May 21 | 1899 Jun 23 |
| The greatest eclipse of the series occurred on 1953 Jul 26, lasting 100 minutes, 43 seconds. | Last | | | |
| The greatest eclipse of the series occurred on 1953 Jul 26, lasting 100 minutes, 43 seconds. | Central | Total | Partial | Penumbral |
| The greatest eclipse of the series occurred on 1953 Jul 26, lasting 100 minutes, 43 seconds. | 2007 Aug 28 | 2097 Oct 21 | 2440 May 17 | 2566 Aug 02 |

Eclipses are tabulated in three columns; every third eclipse in the same column is one exeligmos apart, so they all cast shadows over approximately the same parts of the Earth.

Series members 29–50 occur between 1801 and 2200:
| 29 | 30 | 31 |
|---|---|---|
| 1809 Apr 30 | 1827 May 11 | 1845 May 21 |
| 32 | 33 | 34 |
| 1863 Jun 01 | 1881 Jun 12 | 1899 Jun 23 |
| 35 | 36 | 37 |
| 1917 Jul 04 | 1935 Jul 16 | 1953 Jul 26 |
| 38 | 39 | 40 |
| 1971 Aug 06 | 1989 Aug 17 | 2007 Aug 28 |
| 41 | 42 | 43 |
| 2025 Sep 07 | 2043 Sep 19 | 2061 Sep 29 |
| 44 | 45 | 46 |
| 2079 Oct 10 | 2097 Oct 21 | 2115 Nov 02 |
| 47 | 48 | 49 |
| 2133 Nov 12 | 2151 Nov 24 | 2169 Dec 04 |
50
2187 Dec 15

=== Tritos series ===
This eclipse is a part of a tritos cycle, repeating at alternating nodes every 135 synodic months (≈ 3986.63 days, or 11 years minus 1 month). Their appearance and longitude are irregular due to a lack of synchronization with the anomalistic month (period of perigee), but groupings of 3 tritos cycles (≈ 33 years minus 3 months) come close (≈ 434.044 anomalistic months), so eclipses are similar in these groupings.

Series members between 1801 and 2200
| 1811 Sep 02 (Saros 115) | 1822 Aug 03 (Saros 116) | 1833 Jul 02 (Saros 117) | 1844 May 31 (Saros 118) | 1855 May 02 (Saros 119) |
| 1866 Mar 31 (Saros 120) | 1877 Feb 27 (Saros 121) | 1888 Jan 28 (Saros 122) | 1898 Dec 27 (Saros 123) | 1909 Nov 27 (Saros 124) |
| 1920 Oct 27 (Saros 125) | 1931 Sep 26 (Saros 126) | 1942 Aug 26 (Saros 127) | 1953 Jul 26 (Saros 128) | 1964 Jun 25 (Saros 129) |
| 1975 May 25 (Saros 130) | 1986 Apr 24 (Saros 131) | 1997 Mar 24 (Saros 132) | 2008 Feb 21 (Saros 133) | 2019 Jan 21 (Saros 134) |
| 2029 Dec 20 (Saros 135) | 2040 Nov 18 (Saros 136) | 2051 Oct 19 (Saros 137) | 2062 Sep 18 (Saros 138) | 2073 Aug 17 (Saros 139) |
| 2084 Jul 17 (Saros 140) | 2095 Jun 17 (Saros 141) | 2106 May 17 (Saros 142) | 2117 Apr 16 (Saros 143) | 2128 Mar 16 (Saros 144) |
| 2139 Feb 13 (Saros 145) | 2150 Jan 13 (Saros 146) | 2160 Dec 13 (Saros 147) | 2171 Nov 12 (Saros 148) | 2182 Oct 11 (Saros 149) |
2193 Sep 11 (Saros 150)

=== Inex series ===
This eclipse is a part of the long period inex cycle, repeating at alternating nodes, every 358 synodic months (≈ 10,571.95 days, or 29 years minus 20 days). Their appearance and longitude are irregular due to a lack of synchronization with the anomalistic month (period of perigee). However, groupings of 3 inex cycles (≈ 87 years minus 2 months) comes close (≈ 1,151.02 anomalistic months), so eclipses are similar in these groupings.

Series members between 1801 and 2200
| 1808 Nov 03 (Saros 123) | 1837 Oct 13 (Saros 124) | 1866 Sep 24 (Saros 125) |
| 1895 Sep 04 (Saros 126) | 1924 Aug 14 (Saros 127) | 1953 Jul 26 (Saros 128) |
| 1982 Jul 06 (Saros 129) | 2011 Jun 15 (Saros 130) | 2040 May 26 (Saros 131) |
| 2069 May 06 (Saros 132) | 2098 Apr 15 (Saros 133) | 2127 Mar 28 (Saros 134) |
| 2156 Mar 07 (Saros 135) | 2185 Feb 14 (Saros 136) | |

=== Half-Saros cycle ===
A lunar eclipse will be preceded and followed by solar eclipses by 9 years and 5.5 days (a half saros). This lunar eclipse is related to two annular solar eclipses of Solar Saros 135.

| July 20, 1944 | July 31, 1962 |

== See also ==
- List of lunar eclipses
- List of 20th-century lunar eclipses
