= July 1935 lunar eclipse =

Total lunar eclipse July 16, 1935

- Total eclipse
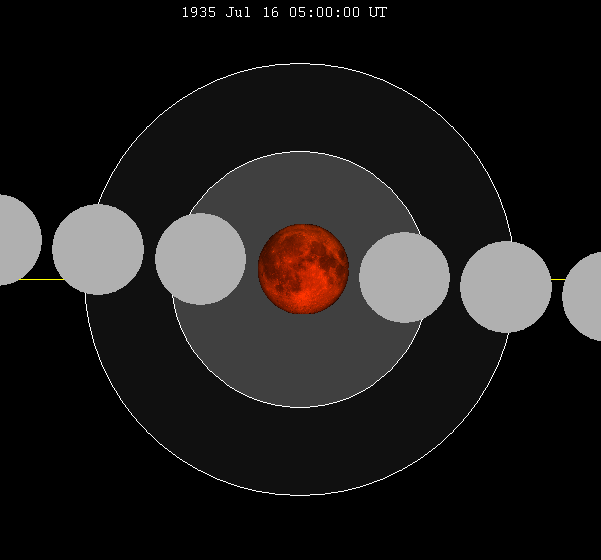
- The Moon's hourly motion shown right to left
- Date: July 16, 1935
- Gamma: 0.0672
- Magnitude: 1.7542
- Saros cycle: 128 (36 of 71)
- Totality: 99 minutes, 37 seconds
- Partiality: 214 minutes, 48 seconds
- Penumbral: 325 minutes, 1 seconds
Contacts (UTC)
- P1: 2:17:08
- U1: 3:12:18
- U2: 4:09:53
- Greatest: 4:59:41
- U3: 5:49:30
- U4: 6:47:06
- P4: 7:42:10

A total lunar eclipse occurred at the Moon’s ascending node of orbit on Tuesday, July 16, 1935, with an umbral magnitude of 1.7542. It was a central lunar eclipse, in which part of the Moon passed through the center of the Earth's shadow. A lunar eclipse occurs when the Moon moves into the Earth's shadow, causing the Moon to be darkened. A total lunar eclipse occurs when the Moon's near side entirely passes into the Earth's umbral shadow. Unlike a solar eclipse, which can only be viewed from a relatively small area of the world, a lunar eclipse may be viewed from anywhere on the night side of Earth. A total lunar eclipse can last up to nearly two hours, while a total solar eclipse lasts only a few minutes at any given place, because the Moon's shadow is smaller. Occurring about 1.9 days before perigee (on July 18, 1935, at 3:35 UTC), the Moon's apparent diameter was larger.

== Visibility ==
The eclipse was completely visible over eastern North America, South America, and Antarctica, seen rising over western North America, the central Pacific Ocean, and eastern Australia and setting over much of Europe and Africa.

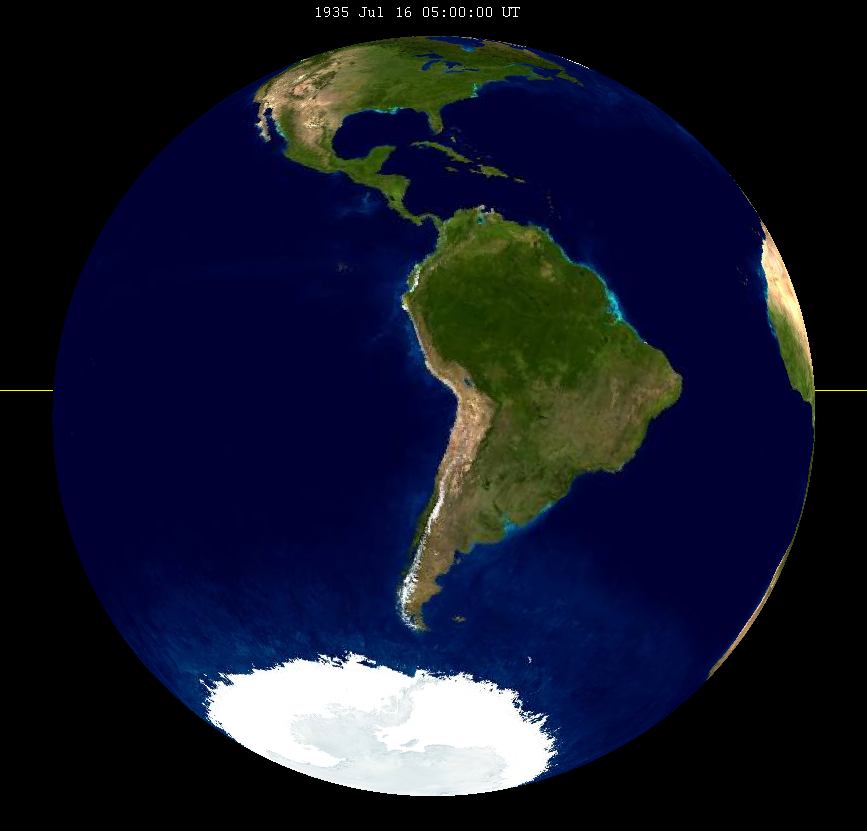
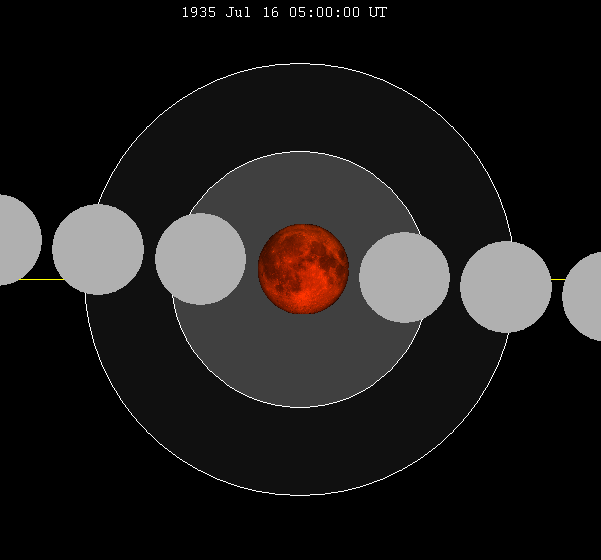

== Eclipse details ==
Shown below is a table displaying details about this particular solar eclipse. It describes various parameters pertaining to this eclipse.

July 16, 1935 Lunar Eclipse Parameters
Parameter	Value
Penumbral Magnitude	2.71461
Umbral Magnitude	1.75423
Gamma	0.06723
Sun Right Ascension	07h38m13.5s
Sun Declination	+21°31'47.9"
Sun Semi-Diameter	15'44.1"
Sun Equatorial Horizontal Parallax	08.7"
Moon Right Ascension	19h38m08.9s
Moon Declination	-21°27'53.8"
Moon Semi-Diameter	16'23.1"
Moon Equatorial Horizontal Parallax	1°00'08.0"
ΔT	23.8 s

== Eclipse season ==
This eclipse is part of an eclipse season, a period, roughly every six months, when eclipses occur. Only two (or occasionally three) eclipse seasons occur each year, and each season lasts about 35 days and repeats just short of six months (173 days) later; thus two full eclipse seasons always occur each year. Either two or three eclipses happen each eclipse season. In the sequence below, each eclipse is separated by a fortnight. The first and last eclipse in this sequence is separated by one synodic month.

Eclipse season of June–July 1935
June 30 Descending node (new moon)	July 16 Ascending node (full moon)	July 30 Descending node (new moon)
Partial solar eclipse Solar Saros 116	Total lunar eclipse Lunar Saros 128	Partial solar eclipse Solar Saros 154

== Related eclipses ==
=== Eclipses in 1935 ===
- A partial solar eclipse on January 5.
- A total lunar eclipse on January 19.
- A partial solar eclipse on February 3.
- A partial solar eclipse on June 30.
- A total lunar eclipse on July 16.
- A partial solar eclipse on July 30.
- An annular solar eclipse on December 25.

=== Metonic ===
- Preceded by: Lunar eclipse of September 26, 1931
- Followed by: Lunar eclipse of May 3, 1939

=== Tzolkinex ===
- Preceded by: Lunar eclipse of June 3, 1928
- Followed by: Lunar eclipse of August 26, 1942

=== Half-Saros ===
- Preceded by: Solar eclipse of July 9, 1926
- Followed by: Solar eclipse of July 20, 1944

=== Tritos ===
- Preceded by: Lunar eclipse of August 14, 1924
- Followed by: Lunar eclipse of June 14, 1946

=== Lunar Saros 128 ===
- Preceded by: Lunar eclipse of July 4, 1917
- Followed by: Lunar eclipse of July 26, 1953

=== Inex ===
- Preceded by: Lunar eclipse of August 4, 1906
- Followed by: Lunar eclipse of June 25, 1964

=== Triad ===
- Preceded by: Lunar eclipse of September 13, 1848
- Followed by: Lunar eclipse of May 16, 2022

=== Lunar eclipses of 1933–1936 ===
This eclipse is a member of a semester series. An eclipse in a semester series of lunar eclipses repeats approximately every 177 days and 4 hours (a semester) at alternating nodes of the Moon's orbit.

The penumbral lunar eclipses on March 12, 1933 and September 4, 1933 occur in the previous lunar year eclipse set.

Lunar eclipse series sets from 1933 to 1936
Descending node				Ascending node			
Saros	Date Viewing	Type Chart	Gamma	Saros	Date Viewing	Type Chart	Gamma
103	1933 Feb 10	Penumbral	1.5600	108	1933 Aug 05	Penumbral	−1.4216
113	1934 Jan 30	Partial	0.9258	118	1934 Jul 26	Partial	−0.6681
123	1935 Jan 19	Total	0.2498	128	1935 Jul 16	Total	0.0672
133	1936 Jan 08	Total	−0.4429	138	1936 Jul 04	Partial	0.8642
143	1936 Dec 28	Penumbral	−1.0971				

=== Saros 128 ===
This eclipse is a part of Saros series 128, repeating every 18 years, 11 days, and containing 71 events. The series started with a penumbral lunar eclipse on June 18, 1304. It contains partial eclipses from September 2, 1430 through May 11, 1827; total eclipses from May 21, 1845 through October 21, 2097; and a second set of partial eclipses from November 2, 2115 through May 17, 2440. The series ends at member 71 as a penumbral eclipse on August 2, 2566.

The longest duration of totality was produced by member 37 at 100 minutes, 43 seconds on July 26, 1953. All eclipses in this series occur at the Moon’s ascending node of orbit.

Greatest	First			
The greatest eclipse of the series occurred on 1953 Jul 26, lasting 100 minutes, 43 seconds.	Penumbral	Partial	Total	Central
The greatest eclipse of the series occurred on 1953 Jul 26, lasting 100 minutes, 43 seconds.	1304 Jun 18	1430 Sep 02	1845 May 21	1899 Jun 23
The greatest eclipse of the series occurred on 1953 Jul 26, lasting 100 minutes, 43 seconds.	Last			
The greatest eclipse of the series occurred on 1953 Jul 26, lasting 100 minutes, 43 seconds.	Central	Total	Partial	Penumbral
The greatest eclipse of the series occurred on 1953 Jul 26, lasting 100 minutes, 43 seconds.	2007 Aug 28	2097 Oct 21	2440 May 17	2566 Aug 02

Eclipses are tabulated in three columns; every third eclipse in the same column is one exeligmos apart, so they all cast shadows over approximately the same parts of the Earth.

Series members 29–50 occur between 1801 and 2200:
29	30	31
1809 Apr 30	1827 May 11	1845 May 21
32	33	34
1863 Jun 01	1881 Jun 12	1899 Jun 23
35	36	37
1917 Jul 04	1935 Jul 16	1953 Jul 26
38	39	40
1971 Aug 06	1989 Aug 17	2007 Aug 28
41	42	43
2025 Sep 07	2043 Sep 19	2061 Sep 29
44	45	46
2079 Oct 10	2097 Oct 21	2115 Nov 02
47	48	49
2133 Nov 12	2151 Nov 24	2169 Dec 04
50
2187 Dec 15

=== Tritos series ===
This eclipse is a part of a tritos cycle, repeating at alternating nodes every 135 synodic months (≈ 3986.63 days, or 11 years minus 1 month). Their appearance and longitude are irregular due to a lack of synchronization with the anomalistic month (period of perigee), but groupings of 3 tritos cycles (≈ 33 years minus 3 months) come close (≈ 434.044 anomalistic months), so eclipses are similar in these groupings.

Series members between 1801 and 2200
1804 Jul 22 (Saros 116)	1815 Jun 21 (Saros 117)	1826 May 21 (Saros 118)	1837 Apr 20 (Saros 119)	1848 Mar 19 (Saros 120)
1859 Feb 17 (Saros 121)	1870 Jan 17 (Saros 122)	1880 Dec 16 (Saros 123)	1891 Nov 16 (Saros 124)	1902 Oct 17 (Saros 125)
1913 Sep 15 (Saros 126)	1924 Aug 14 (Saros 127)	1935 Jul 16 (Saros 128)	1946 Jun 14 (Saros 129)	1957 May 13 (Saros 130)
1968 Apr 13 (Saros 131)	1979 Mar 13 (Saros 132)	1990 Feb 09 (Saros 133)	2001 Jan 09 (Saros 134)	2011 Dec 10 (Saros 135)
2022 Nov 08 (Saros 136)	2033 Oct 08 (Saros 137)	2044 Sep 07 (Saros 138)	2055 Aug 07 (Saros 139)	2066 Jul 07 (Saros 140)
2077 Jun 06 (Saros 141)	2088 May 05 (Saros 142)	2099 Apr 05 (Saros 143)	2110 Mar 06 (Saros 144)	2121 Feb 02 (Saros 145)
2132 Jan 02 (Saros 146)	2142 Dec 03 (Saros 147)	2153 Nov 01 (Saros 148)	2164 Sep 30 (Saros 149)	2175 Aug 31 (Saros 150)
2186 Jul 31 (Saros 151)	2197 Jun 29 (Saros 152)			

=== Inex series ===
This eclipse is a part of the long period inex cycle, repeating at alternating nodes, every 358 synodic months (≈ 10,571.95 days, or 29 years minus 20 days). Their appearance and longitude are irregular due to a lack of synchronization with the anomalistic month (period of perigee). However, groupings of 3 inex cycles (≈ 87 years minus 2 months) comes close (≈ 1,151.02 anomalistic months), so eclipses are similar in these groupings.

Series members between 1801 and 2200
1819 Oct 03 (Saros 124)	1848 Sep 13 (Saros 125)	1877 Aug 23 (Saros 126)
1906 Aug 04 (Saros 127)	1935 Jul 16 (Saros 128)	1964 Jun 25 (Saros 129)
1993 Jun 04 (Saros 130)	2022 May 16 (Saros 131)	2051 Apr 26 (Saros 132)
2080 Apr 04 (Saros 133)	2109 Mar 17 (Saros 134)	2138 Feb 24 (Saros 135)
2167 Feb 04 (Saros 136)	2196 Jan 15 (Saros 137)	

=== Half-Saros cycle ===
A lunar eclipse will be preceded and followed by solar eclipses by 9 years and 5.5 days (a half saros). This lunar eclipse is related to two annular solar eclipses of Solar Saros 135.

July 9, 1926	July 20, 1944

== See also ==
- List of lunar eclipses
- List of 20th-century lunar eclipses
