= August 1971 lunar eclipse =

Total lunar eclipse August 6, 1971

- Total eclipse
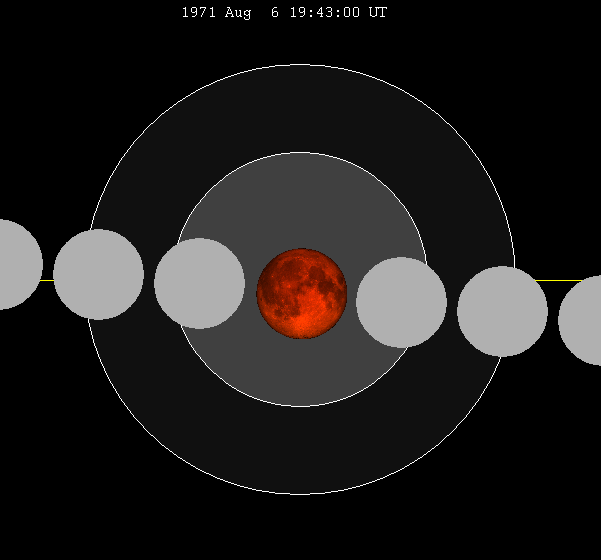
- The Moon's hourly motion shown right to left
- Date: August 6, 1971
- Gamma: −0.0794
- Magnitude: 1.7283
- Saros cycle: 128 (38 of 71)
- Totality: 99 minutes, 25 seconds
- Partiality: 215 minutes, 30 seconds
- Penumbral: 327 minutes, 17 seconds
Contacts (UTC)
- P1: 16:59:29
- U1: 17:55:26
- U2: 18:53:28
- Greatest: 19:43:10
- U3: 20:32:53
- U4: 21:30:56
- P4: 22:26:46

A total lunar eclipse occurred at the Moon’s ascending node of orbit on Friday, August 6, 1971, with an umbral magnitude of 1.7283. It was a central lunar eclipse, in which part of the Moon passed through the center of the Earth's shadow. A lunar eclipse occurs when the Moon moves into the Earth's shadow, causing the Moon to be darkened. A total lunar eclipse occurs when the Moon's near side entirely passes into the Earth's umbral shadow. Unlike a solar eclipse, which can only be viewed from a relatively small area of the world, a lunar eclipse may be viewed from anywhere on the night side of Earth. A total lunar eclipse can last up to nearly two hours, while a total solar eclipse lasts only a few minutes at any given place, because the Moon's shadow is smaller. Occurring about 2.3 days before perigee (on August 9, 1971, at 2:00 UTC), the Moon's apparent diameter was larger.

== Visibility ==
The eclipse was completely visible over central and east Africa, much of Asia, western Australia, and Antarctica, seen rising over central and eastern South America, Europe, and west Africa and setting over east and northeast Asia and eastern Australia.

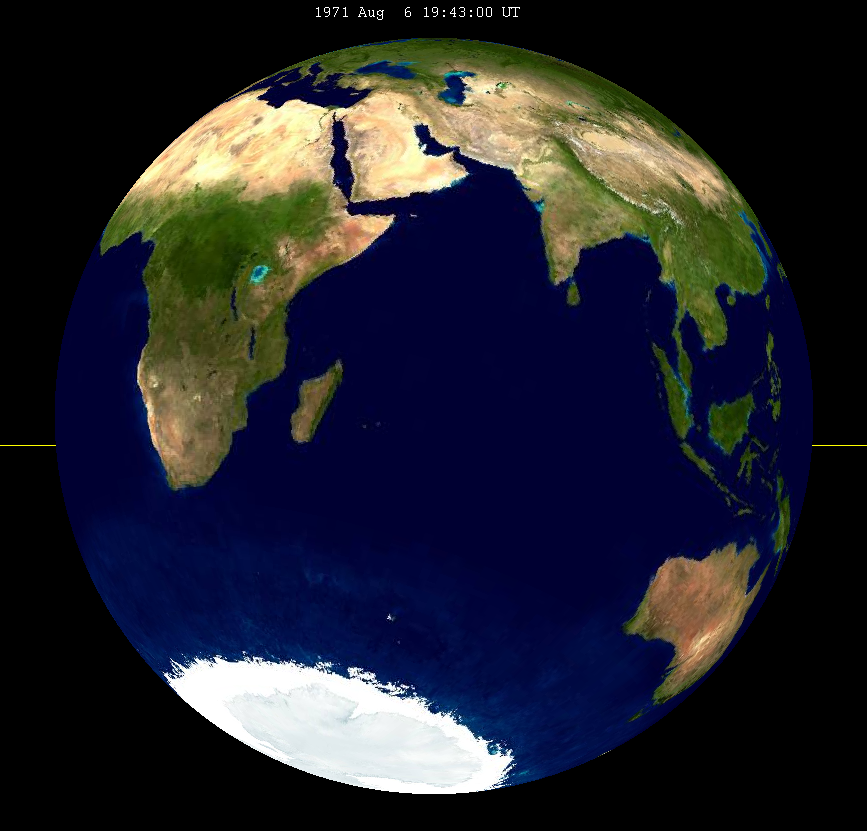
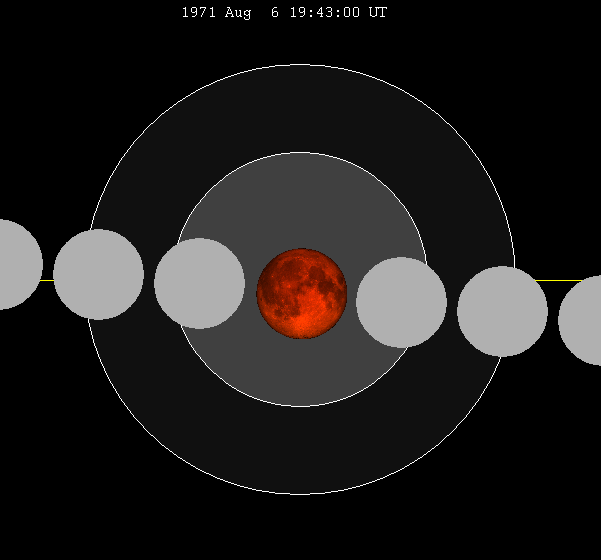

== Eclipse details ==
Shown below is a table displaying details about this particular solar eclipse. It describes various parameters pertaining to this eclipse.

August 6, 1971 Lunar Eclipse Parameters
Parameter	Value
Penumbral Magnitude	2.69580
Umbral Magnitude	1.72830
Gamma	−0.07944
Sun Right Ascension	09h04m36.6s
Sun Declination	+16°43'16.0"
Sun Semi-Diameter	15'46.2"
Sun Equatorial Horizontal Parallax	08.7"
Moon Right Ascension	21h04m44.2s
Moon Declination	-16°47'39.7"
Moon Semi-Diameter	16'17.9"
Moon Equatorial Horizontal Parallax	0°59'49.1"
ΔT	41.8 s

== Eclipse season ==
This eclipse is part of an eclipse season, a period, roughly every six months, when eclipses occur. Only two (or occasionally three) eclipse seasons occur each year, and each season lasts about 35 days and repeats just short of six months (173 days) later; thus two full eclipse seasons always occur each year. Either two or three eclipses happen each eclipse season. In the sequence below, each eclipse is separated by a fortnight. The first and last eclipse in this sequence is separated by one synodic month.

Eclipse season of July–August 1971
July 22 Descending node (new moon)	August 6 Ascending node (full moon)	August 20 Descending node (new moon)
Partial solar eclipse Solar Saros 116	Total lunar eclipse Lunar Saros 128	Partial solar eclipse Solar Saros 154

== Related eclipses ==
=== Eclipses in 1971 ===
- A total lunar eclipse on February 10.
- A partial solar eclipse on February 25.
- A partial solar eclipse on July 22.
- A total lunar eclipse on August 6.
- A partial solar eclipse on August 20.

=== Metonic ===
- Preceded by: Lunar eclipse of October 18, 1967
- Followed by: Lunar eclipse of May 25, 1975

=== Tzolkinex ===
- Preceded by: Lunar eclipse of June 25, 1964
- Followed by: Lunar eclipse of September 16, 1978

=== Half-Saros ===
- Preceded by: Solar eclipse of July 31, 1962
- Followed by: Solar eclipse of August 10, 1980

=== Tritos ===
- Preceded by: Lunar eclipse of September 5, 1960
- Followed by: Lunar eclipse of July 6, 1982

=== Lunar Saros 128 ===
- Preceded by: Lunar eclipse of July 26, 1953
- Followed by: Lunar eclipse of August 17, 1989

=== Inex ===
- Preceded by: Lunar eclipse of August 26, 1942
- Followed by: Lunar eclipse of July 16, 2000

=== Triad ===
- Preceded by: Lunar eclipse of October 4, 1884
- Followed by: Lunar eclipse of June 6, 2058

=== Lunar eclipses of 1969–1973 ===
This eclipse is a member of a semester series. An eclipse in a semester series of lunar eclipses repeats approximately every 177 days and 4 hours (a semester) at alternating nodes of the Moon's orbit.

The penumbral lunar eclipses on April 2, 1969 and September 25, 1969 occur in the previous lunar year eclipse set, and the lunar eclipses on June 15, 1973 (penumbral) and December 10, 1973 (partial) occur in the next lunar year eclipse set.

Lunar eclipse series sets from 1969 to 1973
Ascending node				Descending node			
Saros	Date Viewing	Type Chart	Gamma	Saros	Date Viewing	Type Chart	Gamma
108	1969 Aug 27	Penumbral	−1.5407	113	1970 Feb 21	Partial	0.9620
118	1970 Aug 17	Partial	−0.8053	123	1971 Feb 10	Total	0.2741
128	1971 Aug 06	Total	−0.0794	133	1972 Jan 30	Total	−0.4273
138	1972 Jul 26	Partial	0.7117	143	1973 Jan 18	Penumbral	−1.0845
148	1973 Jul 15	Penumbral	1.5178				

=== Saros 128 ===
This eclipse is a part of Saros series 128, repeating every 18 years, 11 days, and containing 71 events. The series started with a penumbral lunar eclipse on June 18, 1304. It contains partial eclipses from September 2, 1430 through May 11, 1827; total eclipses from May 21, 1845 through October 21, 2097; and a second set of partial eclipses from November 2, 2115 through May 17, 2440. The series ends at member 71 as a penumbral eclipse on August 2, 2566.

The longest duration of totality was produced by member 37 at 100 minutes, 43 seconds on July 26, 1953. All eclipses in this series occur at the Moon’s ascending node of orbit.

Greatest	First			
The greatest eclipse of the series occurred on 1953 Jul 26, lasting 100 minutes, 43 seconds.	Penumbral	Partial	Total	Central
The greatest eclipse of the series occurred on 1953 Jul 26, lasting 100 minutes, 43 seconds.	1304 Jun 18	1430 Sep 02	1845 May 21	1899 Jun 23
The greatest eclipse of the series occurred on 1953 Jul 26, lasting 100 minutes, 43 seconds.	Last			
The greatest eclipse of the series occurred on 1953 Jul 26, lasting 100 minutes, 43 seconds.	Central	Total	Partial	Penumbral
The greatest eclipse of the series occurred on 1953 Jul 26, lasting 100 minutes, 43 seconds.	2007 Aug 28	2097 Oct 21	2440 May 17	2566 Aug 02

Eclipses are tabulated in three columns; every third eclipse in the same column is one exeligmos apart, so they all cast shadows over approximately the same parts of the Earth.

Series members 29–50 occur between 1801 and 2200:
29	30	31
1809 Apr 30	1827 May 11	1845 May 21
32	33	34
1863 Jun 01	1881 Jun 12	1899 Jun 23
35	36	37
1917 Jul 04	1935 Jul 16	1953 Jul 26
38	39	40
1971 Aug 06	1989 Aug 17	2007 Aug 28
41	42	43
2025 Sep 07	2043 Sep 19	2061 Sep 29
44	45	46
2079 Oct 10	2097 Oct 21	2115 Nov 02
47	48	49
2133 Nov 12	2151 Nov 24	2169 Dec 04
50
2187 Dec 15

=== Tritos series ===
This eclipse is a part of a tritos cycle, repeating at alternating nodes every 135 synodic months (≈ 3986.63 days, or 11 years minus 1 month). Their appearance and longitude are irregular due to a lack of synchronization with the anomalistic month (period of perigee), but groupings of 3 tritos cycles (≈ 33 years minus 3 months) come close (≈ 434.044 anomalistic months), so eclipses are similar in these groupings.

Series members between 1801 and 2200
1807 Nov 15 (Saros 113)	1818 Oct 14 (Saros 114)	1829 Sep 13 (Saros 115)	1840 Aug 13 (Saros 116)	1851 Jul 13 (Saros 117)
1862 Jun 12 (Saros 118)	1873 May 12 (Saros 119)	1884 Apr 10 (Saros 120)	1895 Mar 11 (Saros 121)	1906 Feb 09 (Saros 122)
1917 Jan 08 (Saros 123)	1927 Dec 08 (Saros 124)	1938 Nov 07 (Saros 125)	1949 Oct 07 (Saros 126)	1960 Sep 05 (Saros 127)
1971 Aug 06 (Saros 128)	1982 Jul 06 (Saros 129)	1993 Jun 04 (Saros 130)	2004 May 04 (Saros 131)	2015 Apr 04 (Saros 132)
2026 Mar 03 (Saros 133)	2037 Jan 31 (Saros 134)	2048 Jan 01 (Saros 135)	2058 Nov 30 (Saros 136)	2069 Oct 30 (Saros 137)
2080 Sep 29 (Saros 138)	2091 Aug 29 (Saros 139)	2102 Jul 30 (Saros 140)	2113 Jun 29 (Saros 141)	2124 May 28 (Saros 142)
2135 Apr 28 (Saros 143)	2146 Mar 28 (Saros 144)	2157 Feb 24 (Saros 145)	2168 Jan 24 (Saros 146)	2178 Dec 24 (Saros 147)
2189 Nov 22 (Saros 148)	2200 Oct 23 (Saros 149)			

=== Inex series ===
This eclipse is a part of the long period inex cycle, repeating at alternating nodes, every 358 synodic months (≈ 10,571.95 days, or 29 years minus 20 days). Their appearance and longitude are irregular due to a lack of synchronization with the anomalistic month (period of perigee). However, groupings of 3 inex cycles (≈ 87 years minus 2 months) comes close (≈ 1,151.02 anomalistic months), so eclipses are similar in these groupings.

Series members between 1801 and 2200
1826 Nov 14 (Saros 123)	1855 Oct 25 (Saros 124)	1884 Oct 04 (Saros 125)
1913 Sep 15 (Saros 126)	1942 Aug 26 (Saros 127)	1971 Aug 06 (Saros 128)
2000 Jul 16 (Saros 129)	2029 Jun 26 (Saros 130)	2058 Jun 06 (Saros 131)
2087 May 17 (Saros 132)	2116 Apr 27 (Saros 133)	2145 Apr 07 (Saros 134)
2174 Mar 18 (Saros 135)

=== Half-Saros cycle ===
A lunar eclipse will be preceded and followed by solar eclipses by 9 years and 5.5 days (a half saros). This lunar eclipse is related to two annular solar eclipses of Solar Saros 135.

July 31, 1962	August 10, 1980

== See also ==
- List of lunar eclipses
- List of 20th-century lunar eclipses
