= September 2043 lunar eclipse =

Astronomical event

- Total eclipse
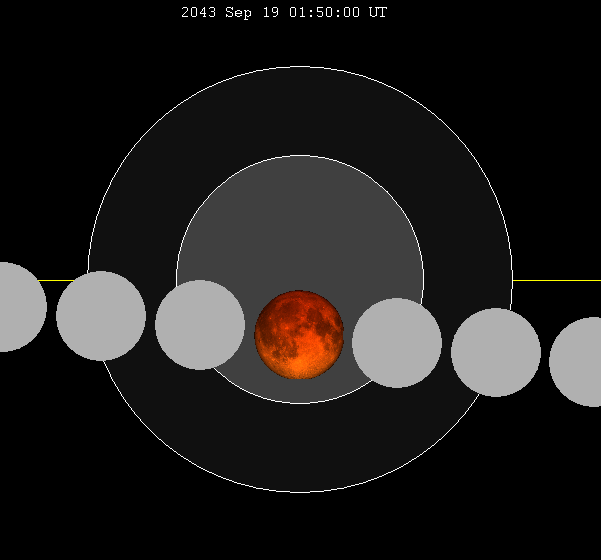
- The Moon's hourly motion shown right to left
- Date: September 19, 2043
- Gamma: −0.3316
- Magnitude: 1.2575
- Saros cycle: 128 (42 of 71)
- Totality: 71 minutes, 44 seconds
- Partiality: 206 minutes, 2 seconds
- Penumbral: 325 minutes, 45 seconds
Contacts (UTC)
- P1: 23:07:27
- U1: 0:07:23
- U2: 1:14:31
- Greatest: 1:50:22
- U3: 2:26:15
- U4: 3:33:24
- P4: 4:33:12

A total lunar eclipse will occur at the Moon’s ascending node of orbit on Saturday, September 19, 2043, with an umbral magnitude of 1.2575. A lunar eclipse occurs when the Moon moves into the Earth's shadow, causing the Moon to be darkened. A total lunar eclipse occurs when the Moon's near side entirely passes into the Earth's umbral shadow. Unlike a solar eclipse, which can only be viewed from a relatively small area of the world, a lunar eclipse may be viewed from anywhere on the night side of Earth. A total lunar eclipse can last up to nearly two hours, while a total solar eclipse lasts only a few minutes at any given place, because the Moon's shadow is smaller. Occurring about 2.8 days before perigee (on September 21, 2043, at 20:20 UTC), the Moon's apparent diameter will be larger.

This lunar eclipse is the second of a tetrad, with four total lunar eclipses in series, the others being on March 25, 2043; March 13, 2044; and September 7, 2044.

== Visibility ==
The eclipse will be completely visible over South America, western Europe, and west Africa, seen rising over North America and setting over east Africa, eastern Europe, and west, central, and south Asia.

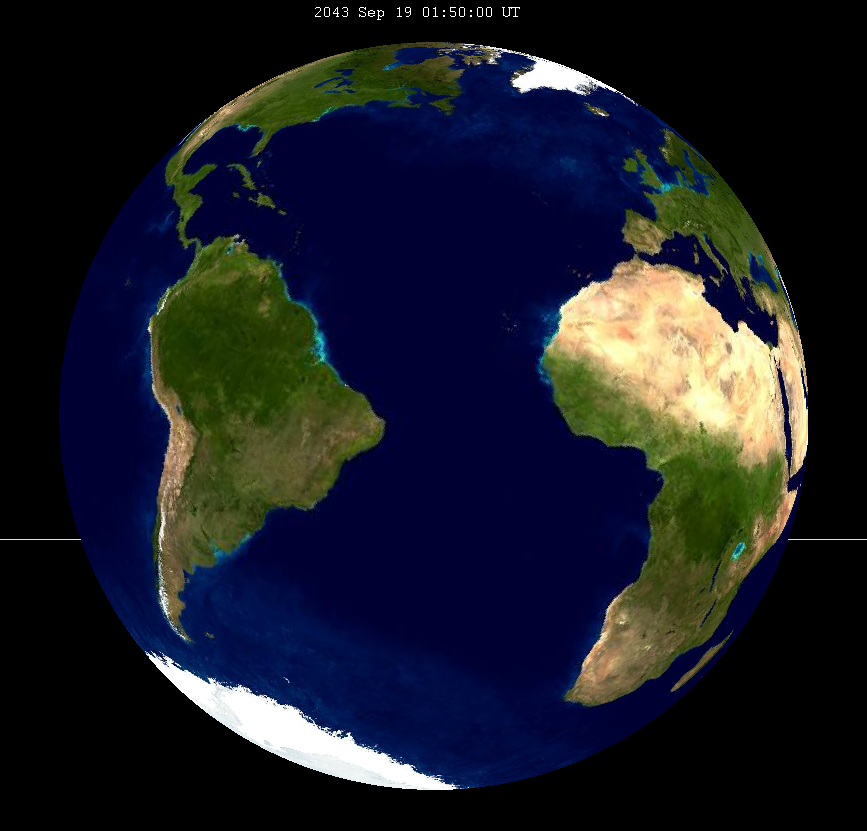
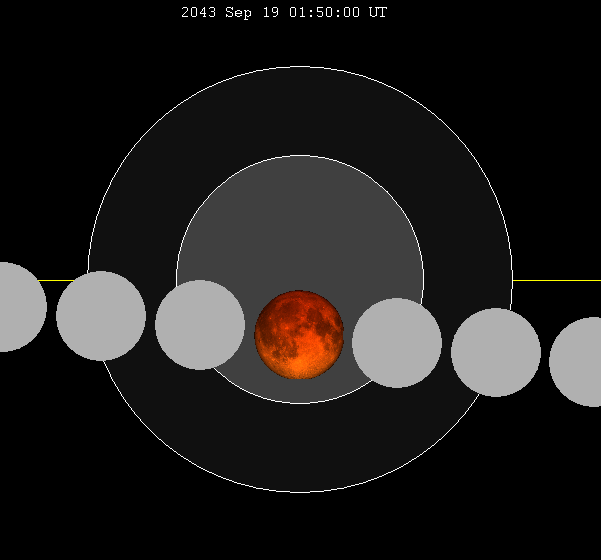

== Eclipse details ==
Shown below is a table displaying details about this particular lunar eclipse. It describes various parameters pertaining to this eclipse.

September 19, 2043 Lunar Eclipse Parameters
Parameter	Value
Penumbral Magnitude	2.24520
Umbral Magnitude	1.25751
Gamma	−0.33164
Sun Right Ascension	11h45m28.0s
Sun Declination	+01°34'24.4"
Sun Semi-Diameter	15'55.1"
Sun Equatorial Horizontal Parallax	08.8"
Moon Right Ascension	23h46m06.1s
Moon Declination	-01°51'33.2"
Moon Semi-Diameter	16'07.0"
Moon Equatorial Horizontal Parallax	0°59'08.8"
ΔT	81.2 s

== Eclipse season ==
This eclipse is part of an eclipse season, a period, roughly every six months, when eclipses occur. Only two (or occasionally three) eclipse seasons occur each year, and each season lasts about 35 days and repeats just short of six months (173 days) later; thus two full eclipse seasons always occur each year. Either two or three eclipses happen each eclipse season. In the sequence below, each eclipse is separated by a fortnight.

Eclipse season of September–October 2043
September 19 Ascending node (full moon)	October 3 Descending node (new moon)
Total lunar eclipse Lunar Saros 128	Annular solar eclipse Solar Saros 154

== Related eclipses ==
=== Eclipses in 2043 ===
- A total lunar eclipse on March 25.
- A non-central total solar eclipse on April 9.
- A total lunar eclipse on September 19.
- A non-central annular solar eclipse on October 3.

=== Metonic ===
- Preceded by: Lunar eclipse of November 30, 2039
- Followed by: Lunar eclipse of July 7, 2047

=== Tzolkinex ===
- Preceded by: Lunar eclipse of August 7, 2036
- Followed by: Lunar eclipse of October 30, 2050

=== Half-Saros ===
- Preceded by: Solar eclipse of September 12, 2034
- Followed by: Solar eclipse of September 22, 2052

=== Tritos ===
- Preceded by: Lunar eclipse of October 18, 2032
- Followed by: Lunar eclipse of August 18, 2054

=== Lunar Saros 128 ===
- Preceded by: Lunar eclipse of September 7, 2025
- Followed by: Lunar eclipse of September 29, 2061

=== Inex ===
- Preceded by: Lunar eclipse of October 8, 2014
- Followed by: Lunar eclipse of August 28, 2072

=== Triad ===
- Preceded by: Lunar eclipse of November 18, 1956
- Followed by: Lunar eclipse of July 21, 2130

=== Lunar eclipses of 2042–2045 ===
This eclipse is a member of a semester series. An eclipse in a semester series of lunar eclipses repeats approximately every 177 days and 4 hours (a semester) at alternating nodes of the Moon's orbit.

The penumbral lunar eclipse on October 28, 2042 occurs in the previous lunar year eclipse set.

Lunar eclipse series sets from 2042 to 2045
Descending node				Ascending node			
Saros	Date Viewing	Type Chart	Gamma	Saros	Date Viewing	Type Chart	Gamma
113	2042 Apr 05	Penumbral	1.1080	118	2042 Sep 29	Penumbral	−1.0261
123	2043 Mar 25	Total	0.3849	128	2043 Sep 19	Total	−0.3316
133	2044 Mar 13	Total	−0.3496	138	2044 Sep 07	Total	0.4318
143	2045 Mar 03	Penumbral	−1.0274	148	2045 Aug 27	Penumbral	1.2060

=== Saros 128 ===
This eclipse is a part of Saros series 128, repeating every 18 years, 11 days, and containing 71 events. The series started with a penumbral lunar eclipse on June 18, 1304. It contains partial eclipses from September 2, 1430 through May 11, 1827; total eclipses from May 21, 1845 through October 21, 2097; and a second set of partial eclipses from November 2, 2115 through May 17, 2440. The series ends at member 71 as a penumbral eclipse on August 2, 2566.

The longest duration of totality was produced by member 37 at 100 minutes, 43 seconds on July 26, 1953. All eclipses in this series occur at the Moon’s ascending node of orbit.

Greatest	First			
The greatest eclipse of the series occurred on 1953 Jul 26, lasting 100 minutes, 43 seconds.	Penumbral	Partial	Total	Central
The greatest eclipse of the series occurred on 1953 Jul 26, lasting 100 minutes, 43 seconds.	1304 Jun 18	1430 Sep 02	1845 May 21	1899 Jun 23
The greatest eclipse of the series occurred on 1953 Jul 26, lasting 100 minutes, 43 seconds.	Last			
The greatest eclipse of the series occurred on 1953 Jul 26, lasting 100 minutes, 43 seconds.	Central	Total	Partial	Penumbral
The greatest eclipse of the series occurred on 1953 Jul 26, lasting 100 minutes, 43 seconds.	2007 Aug 28	2097 Oct 21	2440 May 17	2566 Aug 02

Eclipses are tabulated in three columns; every third eclipse in the same column is one exeligmos apart, so they all cast shadows over approximately the same parts of the Earth.

Series members 29–50 occur between 1801 and 2200:
29	30	31
1809 Apr 30	1827 May 11	1845 May 21
32	33	34
1863 Jun 01	1881 Jun 12	1899 Jun 23
35	36	37
1917 Jul 04	1935 Jul 16	1953 Jul 26
38	39	40
1971 Aug 06	1989 Aug 17	2007 Aug 28
41	42	43
2025 Sep 07	2043 Sep 19	2061 Sep 29
44	45	46
2079 Oct 10	2097 Oct 21	2115 Nov 02
47	48	49
2133 Nov 12	2151 Nov 24	2169 Dec 04
50
2187 Dec 15

=== Tritos series ===
This eclipse is a part of a tritos cycle, repeating at alternating nodes every 135 synodic months (≈ 3986.63 days, or 11 years minus 1 month). Their appearance and longitude are irregular due to a lack of synchronization with the anomalistic month (period of perigee), but groupings of 3 tritos cycles (≈ 33 years minus 3 months) come close (≈ 434.044 anomalistic months), so eclipses are similar in these groupings.

Series members between 1801 and 2200
1803 Aug 03 (Saros 106)	1814 Jul 02 (Saros 107)	1825 Jun 01 (Saros 108)	1836 May 01 (Saros 109)	1847 Mar 31 (Saros 110)
1858 Feb 27 (Saros 111)	1869 Jan 28 (Saros 112)	1879 Dec 28 (Saros 113)	1890 Nov 26 (Saros 114)	1901 Oct 27 (Saros 115)
1912 Sep 26 (Saros 116)	1923 Aug 26 (Saros 117)	1934 Jul 26 (Saros 118)	1945 Jun 25 (Saros 119)	1956 May 24 (Saros 120)
1967 Apr 24 (Saros 121)	1978 Mar 24 (Saros 122)	1989 Feb 20 (Saros 123)	2000 Jan 21 (Saros 124)	2010 Dec 21 (Saros 125)
2021 Nov 19 (Saros 126)	2032 Oct 18 (Saros 127)	2043 Sep 19 (Saros 128)	2054 Aug 18 (Saros 129)	2065 Jul 17 (Saros 130)
2076 Jun 17 (Saros 131)	2087 May 17 (Saros 132)	2098 Apr 15 (Saros 133)	2109 Mar 17 (Saros 134)	2120 Feb 14 (Saros 135)
2131 Jan 13 (Saros 136)	2141 Dec 13 (Saros 137)	2152 Nov 12 (Saros 138)	2163 Oct 12 (Saros 139)	2174 Sep 11 (Saros 140)
2185 Aug 11 (Saros 141)	2196 Jul 10 (Saros 142)			

=== Inex series ===
This eclipse is a part of the long period inex cycle, repeating at alternating nodes, every 358 synodic months (≈ 10,571.95 days, or 29 years minus 20 days). Their appearance and longitude are irregular due to a lack of synchronization with the anomalistic month (period of perigee). However, groupings of 3 inex cycles (≈ 87 years minus 2 months) comes close (≈ 1,151.02 anomalistic months), so eclipses are similar in these groupings.

Series members between 1801 and 2200
1812 Feb 27 (Saros 120)	1841 Feb 06 (Saros 121)	1870 Jan 17 (Saros 122)
1898 Dec 27 (Saros 123)	1927 Dec 08 (Saros 124)	1956 Nov 18 (Saros 125)
1985 Oct 28 (Saros 126)	2014 Oct 08 (Saros 127)	2043 Sep 19 (Saros 128)
2072 Aug 28 (Saros 129)	2101 Aug 09 (Saros 130)	2130 Jul 21 (Saros 131)
2159 Jun 30 (Saros 132)	2188 Jun 09 (Saros 133)	

=== Half-Saros cycle ===
A lunar eclipse will be preceded and followed by solar eclipses by 9 years and 5.5 days (a half saros). This lunar eclipse is related to two annular solar eclipses of Solar Saros 135.

September 12, 2034	September 22, 2052

== See also ==
- List of lunar eclipses and List of 21st-century lunar eclipses
