= Lunar Saros 128 =

Series of lunar eclipses

| Member 40 | Member 41 |
|---|---|
| 2007 Aug 28 | 2025 Sep 07 |

Saros cycle series 128 for lunar eclipses occurs at the moon's ascending node, repeating every 18 years 11 and 1/3 days. It contains 71 events. Solar saros 135 interleaves with this lunar saros with an event occurring every 9 years 5 days alternating between each saros series.

This lunar saros is linked to Solar Saros 135.

== Lunar Saros 128 ==
Solar Saros 135 interleaves with this lunar saros with an event occurring every 9 years 5 days alternating between each saros series.

== Summary ==
This eclipse is a part of Saros series 128, repeating every 18 years, 11 days, and containing 71 events. The series started with a penumbral lunar eclipse on June 18, 1304. It contains partial eclipses from September 2, 1430 through May 11, 1827; total eclipses from May 21, 1845 through October 21, 2097; and a second set of partial eclipses from November 2, 2115 through May 17, 2440. The series ends at member 71 as a penumbral eclipse on August 2, 2566.

The longest duration of totality was produced by member 37 at 100 minutes, 43 seconds on July 26, 1953. All eclipses in this series occur at the Moon’s ascending node of orbit.

| Greatest | First | | | |
|---|---|---|---|---|
| The greatest eclipse of the series occurred on 1953 Jul 26, lasting 100 minutes, 43 seconds. | Penumbral | Partial | Total | Central |
| The greatest eclipse of the series occurred on 1953 Jul 26, lasting 100 minutes, 43 seconds. | 1304 Jun 18 | 1430 Sep 02 | 1845 May 21 | 1899 Jun 23 |
| The greatest eclipse of the series occurred on 1953 Jul 26, lasting 100 minutes, 43 seconds. | Last | | | |
| The greatest eclipse of the series occurred on 1953 Jul 26, lasting 100 minutes, 43 seconds. | Central | Total | Partial | Penumbral |
| The greatest eclipse of the series occurred on 1953 Jul 26, lasting 100 minutes, 43 seconds. | 2007 Aug 28 | 2097 Oct 21 | 2440 May 17 | 2566 Aug 02 |

Eclipses are tabulated in three columns; every third eclipse in the same column is one exeligmos apart, so they all cast shadows over approximately the same parts of the Earth.

Series members 29–50 occur between 1801 and 2200:
| 29 | 30 | 31 |
|---|---|---|
| 1809 Apr 30 | 1827 May 11 | 1845 May 21 |
| 32 | 33 | 34 |
| 1863 Jun 01 | 1881 Jun 12 | 1899 Jun 23 |
| 35 | 36 | 37 |
| 1917 Jul 04 | 1935 Jul 16 | 1953 Jul 26 |
| 38 | 39 | 40 |
| 1971 Aug 06 | 1989 Aug 17 | 2007 Aug 28 |
| 41 | 42 | 43 |
| 2025 Sep 07 | 2043 Sep 19 | 2061 Sep 29 |
| 44 | 45 | 46 |
| 2079 Oct 10 | 2097 Oct 21 | 2115 Nov 02 |
| 47 | 48 | 49 |
| 2133 Nov 12 | 2151 Nov 24 | 2169 Dec 04 |
50
2187 Dec 15

Lunar Saros 128 contains 15 total lunar eclipses between 1845 and 2097 (in years 1845, 1863, 1881, 1899, 1917, 1935, 1953, 1971, 1989, 2007, 2025, 2043, 2061, 2079 and 2097). Solar Saros 135 interleaves with this lunar saros with an event occurring every 9 years 5 days alternating between each saros series.

== List ==
| Cat. | Saros | Mem | Date | Time UT (hr:mn) | Type | Gamma | Magnitude | Duration (min) | | | Contacts UT (hr:mn) | | | | | | Chart |
| Cat. | Saros | Mem | Date | Greatest | Type | Gamma | Magnitude | Pen. | Par. | Tot. | P1 | P4 | U1 | U2 | U3 | U4 | Chart |
|---|---|---|---|---|---|---|---|---|---|---|---|---|---|---|---|---|---|
| 07984 | 128 | 1 | 1304 Jun 18 | 9:25:47 | Penumbral | 1.4896 | -0.8572 | 88.5 | | | 8:41:32 | 10:10:02 | | | | | |
| 08027 | 128 | 2 | 1322 Jun 29 | 16:45:29 | Penumbral | 1.4140 | -0.7173 | 132.1 | | | 15:39:26 | 17:51:32 | | | | | |
| 08069 | 128 | 3 | 1340 Jul 10 | 0:06:41 | Penumbral | 1.3388 | -0.5785 | 162.6 | | | 22:45:23 | 1:27:59 | | | | | |
| 08111 | 128 | 4 | 1358 Jul 21 | 7:33:39 | Penumbral | 1.2675 | -0.4473 | 185.5 | | | 6:00:54 | 9:06:24 | | | | | |
| 08152 | 128 | 5 | 1376 Jul 31 | 15:04:49 | Penumbral | 1.1989 | -0.3213 | 204.0 | | | 13:22:49 | 16:46:49 | | | | | |
| 08193 | 128 | 6 | 1394 Aug 11 | 22:42:10 | Penumbral | 1.1347 | -0.2035 | 219.0 | | | 20:52:40 | 0:31:40 | | | | | |
| 08234 | 128 | 7 | 1412 Aug 22 | 6:26:36 | Penumbral | 1.0758 | -0.0957 | 231.2 | | | 4:31:00 | 8:22:12 | | | | | |
| 08276 | 128 | 8 | 1430 Sep 02 | 14:18:56 | Partial | 1.0229 | 0.0008 | 241.1 | 6.3 | | 12:18:23 | 16:19:29 | 14:15:47 | | | 14:22:05 | |
| 08317 | 128 | 9 | 1448 Sep 12 | 22:19:32 | Partial | 0.9764 | 0.0854 | 249.0 | 63.3 | | 20:15:02 | 0:24:02 | 21:47:53 | | | 22:51:11 | |
| 08358 | 128 | 10 | 1466 Sep 24 | 6:28:03 | Partial | 0.9362 | 0.1585 | 255.4 | 85.3 | | 4:20:21 | 8:35:45 | 5:45:24 | | | 7:10:42 | |
| 08398 | 128 | 11 | 1484 Oct 04 | 14:45:35 | Partial | 0.9031 | 0.2185 | 260.3 | 99.2 | | 12:35:26 | 16:55:44 | 13:55:59 | | | 15:35:11 | |
| 08438 | 128 | 12 | 1502 Oct 15 | 23:10:40 | Partial | 0.8759 | 0.2675 | 264.1 | 108.8 | | 20:58:37 | 1:22:43 | 22:16:16 | | | 0:05:04 | |
| 08478 | 128 | 13 | 1520 Oct 26 | 7:43:02 | Partial | 0.8549 | 0.3053 | 266.9 | 115.5 | | 5:29:35 | 9:56:29 | 6:45:17 | | | 8:40:47 | |
| 08519 | 128 | 14 | 1538 Nov 06 | 16:22:02 | Partial | 0.8392 | 0.3334 | 268.9 | 120.1 | | 14:07:35 | 18:36:29 | 15:21:59 | | | 17:22:05 | |
| 08561 | 128 | 15 | 1556 Nov 17 | 1:06:54 | Partial | 0.8286 | 0.3523 | 270.2 | 123.0 | | 22:51:48 | 3:22:00 | 0:05:24 | | | 2:08:24 | |
| 08604 | 128 | 16 | 1574 Nov 28 | 9:55:43 | Partial | 0.8213 | 0.3655 | 271.1 | 125.0 | | 7:40:10 | 12:11:16 | 8:53:13 | | | 10:58:13 | |
| 08647 | 128 | 17 | 1592 Dec 18 | 18:46:58 | Partial | 0.8160 | 0.3749 | 271.7 | 126.4 | | 16:31:07 | 21:02:49 | 17:43:46 | | | 19:50:10 | |
| 08691 | 128 | 18 | 1610 Dec 30 | 3:39:54 | Partial | 0.8124 | 0.3817 | 272.1 | 127.3 | | 1:23:51 | 5:55:57 | 2:36:15 | | | 4:43:33 | |
| 08736 | 128 | 19 | 1629 Jan 09 | 12:32:47 | Partial | 0.8092 | 0.3877 | 272.4 | 128.2 | | 10:16:35 | 14:48:59 | 11:28:41 | | | 13:36:53 | |
| 08780 | 128 | 20 | 1647 Jan 20 | 21:23:09 | Partial | 0.8039 | 0.3979 | 273.0 | 129.7 | | 19:06:39 | 23:39:39 | 20:18:18 | | | 22:28:00 | |
| 08825 | 128 | 21 | 1665 Jan 31 | 6:10:20 | Partial | 0.7963 | 0.4124 | 273.9 | 131.8 | | 3:53:23 | 8:27:17 | 5:04:26 | | | 7:16:14 | |
| 08871 | 128 | 22 | 1683 Feb 11 | 14:52:35 | Partial | 0.7848 | 0.4345 | 275.2 | 134.9 | | 12:34:59 | 17:10:11 | 13:45:08 | | | 16:00:02 | |
| 08917 | 128 | 23 | 1701 Feb 22 | 23:29:56 | Partial | 0.7695 | 0.4634 | 277.0 | 138.8 | | 21:11:26 | 1:48:26 | 22:20:32 | | | 0:39:20 | |
| 08963 | 128 | 24 | 1719 Mar 06 | 7:59:13 | Partial | 0.7478 | 0.5043 | 279.5 | 143.9 | | 5:39:28 | 10:18:58 | 6:47:16 | | | 9:11:10 | |
| 09010 | 128 | 25 | 1737 Mar 16 | 16:22:12 | Partial | 0.7211 | 0.5542 | 282.5 | 149.9 | | 14:00:57 | 18:43:27 | 15:07:15 | | | 17:37:09 | |
| 09057 | 128 | 26 | 1755 Mar 28 | 0:36:25 | Partial | 0.6871 | 0.6176 | 286.2 | 156.8 | | 22:13:19 | 2:59:31 | 23:18:01 | | | 1:54:49 | |
| 09103 | 128 | 27 | 1773 Apr 07 | 8:43:30 | Partial | 0.6476 | 0.6909 | 290.2 | 164.1 | | 6:18:24 | 11:08:36 | 7:21:27 | | | 10:05:33 | |
| 09148 | 128 | 28 | 1791 Apr 18 | 16:41:28 | Partial | 0.6008 | 0.7776 | 294.7 | 171.8 | | 14:14:07 | 19:08:49 | 15:15:34 | | | 18:07:22 | |
| 09193 | 128 | 29 | 1809 Apr 30 | 0:33:02 | Partial | 0.5490 | 0.8733 | 299.3 | 179.4 | | 22:03:23 | 3:02:41 | 23:03:20 | | | 2:02:44 | |
| 09238 | 128 | 30 | 1827 May 11 | 8:16:57 | Partial | 0.4910 | 0.9801 | 304.0 | 186.8 | | 5:44:57 | 10:48:57 | 6:43:33 | | | 9:50:21 | |
| 09285 | 128 | 31 | 1845 May 21 | 15:54:30 | Total | 0.4281 | 1.0957 | 308.6 | 193.7 | 45.3 | 13:20:12 | 18:28:48 | 14:17:39 | 15:31:51 | 16:17:09 | 17:31:21 | |
| 09330 | 128 | 32 | 1863 Jun 01 | 23:26:14 | Total | 0.3605 | 1.2195 | 312.9 | 199.9 | 66.1 | 20:49:47 | 2:02:41 | 21:46:17 | 22:53:11 | 23:59:17 | 1:06:11 | |
| 09374 | 128 | 33 | 1881 Jun 12 | 6:53:44 | Total | 0.2898 | 1.3488 | 316.8 | 205.2 | 79.9 | 4:15:20 | 9:32:08 | 5:11:08 | 6:13:47 | 7:33:41 | 8:36:20 | |
| 09418 | 128 | 34 | 1899 Jun 23 | 14:17:53 | Total | 0.2169 | 1.4820 | 320.1 | 209.5 | 89.5 | 11:37:50 | 16:57:56 | 12:33:08 | 13:33:08 | 15:02:38 | 16:02:38 | |
| 09460 | 128 | 35 | 1917 Jul 04 | 21:39:04 | Total | 0.1419 | 1.6185 | 322.9 | 212.8 | 96.0 | 18:57:37 | 0:20:31 | 19:52:40 | 20:51:04 | 22:27:04 | 23:25:28 | |
| 09502 | 128 | 36 | 1935 Jul 16 | 5:00:05 | Total | 0.0672 | 1.7542 | 325.0 | 214.8 | 99.6 | 2:17:35 | 7:42:35 | 3:12:41 | 4:10:17 | 5:49:53 | 6:47:29 | |
| 09543 | 128 | 37 | 1953 Jul 26 | 12:21:10 | Total | -0.0071 | 1.8628 | 326.5 | 215.7 | 100.7 | 9:37:55 | 15:04:25 | 10:33:19 | 11:30:49 | 13:11:31 | 14:09:01 | |
| 09584 | 128 | 38 | 1971 Aug 06 | 19:43:52 | Total | -0.0794 | 1.7283 | 327.3 | 215.5 | 99.4 | 17:00:13 | 22:27:31 | 17:56:07 | 18:54:10 | 20:33:34 | 21:31:37 | |
| 09625 | 128 | 39 | 1989 Aug 17 | 3:09:07 | Total | -0.1490 | 1.5984 | 327.5 | 214.3 | 95.8 | 0:25:22 | 5:52:52 | 1:21:58 | 2:21:13 | 3:57:01 | 4:56:16 | |
| 09666 | 128 | 40 | 2007 Aug 28 | 10:38:27 | Total | -0.2145 | 1.4758 | 327.3 | 212.2 | 90.0 | 7:54:48 | 13:22:06 | 8:52:21 | 9:53:27 | 11:23:27 | 12:24:33 | |
| 09707 | 128 | 41 | 2025 Sep 07 | 18:12:58 | Total | -0.2752 | 1.3619 | 326.7 | 209.4 | 82.1 | 15:29:37 | 20:56:19 | 16:28:16 | 17:31:55 | 18:54:01 | 19:57:40 | |
| 09748 | 128 | 42 | 2043 Sep 19 | 1:51:50 | Total | -0.3316 | 1.2556 | 325.8 | 206.0 | 71.7 | 23:08:56 | 4:34:44 | 0:08:50 | 1:15:59 | 2:27:41 | 3:34:50 | |
| 09789 | 128 | 43 | 2061 Sep 29 | 9:38:13 | Total | -0.3810 | 1.1621 | 324.8 | 202.4 | 59.0 | 6:55:49 | 12:20:37 | 7:57:01 | 9:08:43 | 10:07:43 | 11:19:25 | |
| 09830 | 128 | 44 | 2079 Oct 10 | 17:30:30 | Total | -0.4246 | 1.0791 | 323.8 | 198.7 | 42.4 | 14:48:36 | 20:12:24 | 15:51:09 | 17:09:18 | 17:51:42 | 19:09:51 | |
| 09872 | 128 | 45 | 2097 Oct 21 | 1:30:55 | Total | -0.4608 | 1.0097 | 323.1 | 195.2 | 15.2 | 22:49:22 | 4:12:28 | 23:53:19 | 1:23:19 | 1:38:31 | 3:08:31 | |
| 09914 | 128 | 46 | 2115 Nov 02 | 9:36:34 | Partial | -0.4919 | 0.9498 | 322.4 | 191.9 | | 6:55:22 | 12:17:46 | 8:00:37 | | | 11:12:31 | |
| 09956 | 128 | 47 | 2133 Nov 12 | 17:50:08 | Partial | -0.5157 | 0.9033 | 322.2 | 189.3 | | 15:09:02 | 20:31:14 | 16:15:29 | | | 19:24:47 | |
| 10000 | 128 | 48 | 2151 Nov 24 | 2:08:13 | Partial | -0.5350 | 0.8651 | 322.2 | 187.0 | | 23:27:07 | 4:49:19 | 0:34:43 | | | 3:41:43 | |
| 10043 | 128 | 49 | 2169 Dec 04 | 10:31:58 | Partial | -0.5488 | 0.8375 | 322.5 | 185.3 | | 7:50:43 | 13:13:13 | 8:59:19 | | | 12:04:37 | |
| 10086 | 128 | 50 | 2187 Dec 15 | 18:58:37 | Partial | -0.5595 | 0.8156 | 323.0 | 184.1 | | 16:17:07 | 21:40:07 | 17:26:34 | | | 20:30:40 | |
| 10129 | 128 | 51 | 2205 Dec 27 | 3:28:47 | Partial | -0.5665 | 0.8008 | 323.8 | 183.4 | | 0:46:53 | 6:10:41 | 1:57:05 | | | 5:00:29 | |
| 10173 | 128 | 52 | 2224 Jan 07 | 11:58:46 | Partial | -0.5731 | 0.7870 | 324.5 | 182.7 | | 9:16:31 | 14:41:01 | 10:27:25 | | | 13:30:07 | |
| 10218 | 128 | 53 | 2242 Jan 17 | 20:28:26 | Partial | -0.5794 | 0.7742 | 325.2 | 182.2 | | 17:45:50 | 23:11:02 | 18:57:20 | | | 21:59:32 | |
| 10264 | 128 | 54 | 2260 Jan 29 | 4:55:22 | Partial | -0.5871 | 0.7589 | 325.7 | 181.3 | | 2:12:31 | 7:38:13 | 3:24:43 | | | 6:26:01 | |
| 10310 | 128 | 55 | 2278 Feb 08 | 13:19:10 | Partial | -0.5965 | 0.7409 | 326.0 | 180.2 | | 10:36:10 | 16:02:10 | 11:49:04 | | | 14:49:16 | |
| 10357 | 128 | 56 | 2296 Feb 19 | 21:35:59 | Partial | -0.6112 | 0.7135 | 325.6 | 178.2 | | 18:53:11 | 0:18:47 | 20:06:53 | | | 23:05:05 | |
| 10403 | 128 | 57 | 2314 Mar 03 | 5:46:48 | Partial | -0.6301 | 0.6784 | 324.8 | 175.3 | | 3:04:24 | 8:29:12 | 4:19:09 | | | 7:14:27 | |
| 10449 | 128 | 58 | 2332 Mar 13 | 13:48:34 | Partial | -0.6557 | 0.6313 | 323.2 | 170.9 | | 11:06:58 | 16:30:10 | 12:23:07 | | | 15:14:01 | |
| 10495 | 128 | 59 | 2350 Mar 24 | 21:42:58 | Partial | -0.6865 | 0.5747 | 320.9 | 165.1 | | 19:02:31 | 0:23:25 | 20:20:25 | | | 23:05:31 | |
| 10540 | 128 | 60 | 2368 Apr 04 | 5:25:31 | Partial | -0.7261 | 0.5021 | 317.3 | 156.6 | | 2:46:52 | 8:04:10 | 4:07:13 | | | 6:43:49 | |
| 10584 | 128 | 61 | 2386 Apr 15 | 12:59:59 | Partial | -0.7715 | 0.4189 | 312.6 | 145.3 | | 10:23:41 | 15:36:17 | 11:47:20 | | | 14:12:38 | |
| 10629 | 128 | 62 | 2404 Apr 25 | 20:22:55 | Partial | -0.8255 | 0.3197 | 306.1 | 129.2 | | 17:49:52 | 22:55:58 | 19:18:19 | | | 21:27:31 | |
| 10673 | 128 | 63 | 2422 May 7 | 3:37:48 | Partial | -0.8852 | 0.2103 | 298.1 | 106.8 | | 1:08:45 | 6:06:51 | 2:44:24 | | | 4:31:12 | |
| 10717 | 128 | 64 | 2440 May 17 | 10:41:49 | Partial | -0.9527 | 0.0862 | 287.8 | 69.8 | | 8:17:55 | 13:05:43 | 10:06:55 | | | 11:16:43 | |
| 10761 | 128 | 65 | 2458 May 28 | 17:39:26 | Penumbral | -1.0244 | -0.0456 | 275.2 | | | 15:21:50 | 19:57:02 | | | | | |
| 10803 | 128 | 66 | 2476 Jun 08 | 0:28:51 | Penumbral | -1.1019 | -0.1884 | 259.5 | | | 22:19:06 | 2:38:36 | | | | | |
| 10844 | 128 | 67 | 2494 Jun 19 | 7:12:41 | Penumbral | -1.1829 | -0.3375 | 240.4 | | | 5:12:29 | 9:12:53 | | | | | |
| 10885 | 128 | 68 | 2512 Jun 30 | 13:51:10 | Penumbral | -1.2672 | -0.4931 | 216.7 | | | 12:02:49 | 15:39:31 | | | | | |
| 10925 | 128 | 69 | 2530 Jul 11 | 20:27:10 | Penumbral | -1.3526 | -0.6507 | 187.3 | | | 18:53:31 | 22:00:49 | | | | | |
| 10966 | 128 | 70 | 2548 Jul 22 | 3:01:34 | Penumbral | -1.4381 | -0.8088 | 149.3 | | | 1:46:55 | 4:16:13 | | | | | |
| 11008 | 128 | 71 | 2566 Aug 02 | 9:35:06 | Penumbral | -1.5233 | -0.9665 | 92.9 | | | 8:48:39 | 10:21:33 | | | | | |

== See also ==
- List of lunar eclipses
  - List of Saros series for lunar eclipses
