= Solar eclipse of May 26, 1854 =

Annular solar eclipse May 26, 1854

- Annular eclipse
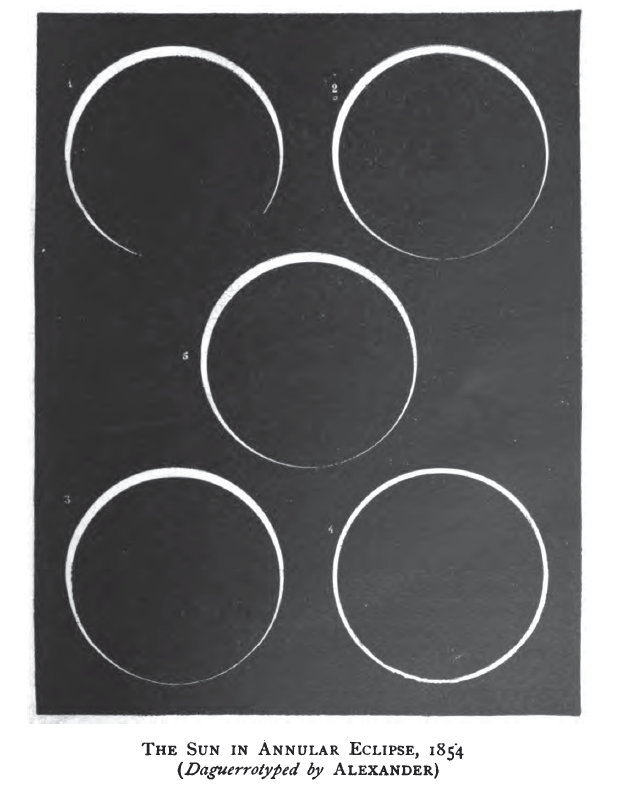
- Annularity Daguerrotyped by Stephen Alexander from Ogdensburgh, New York

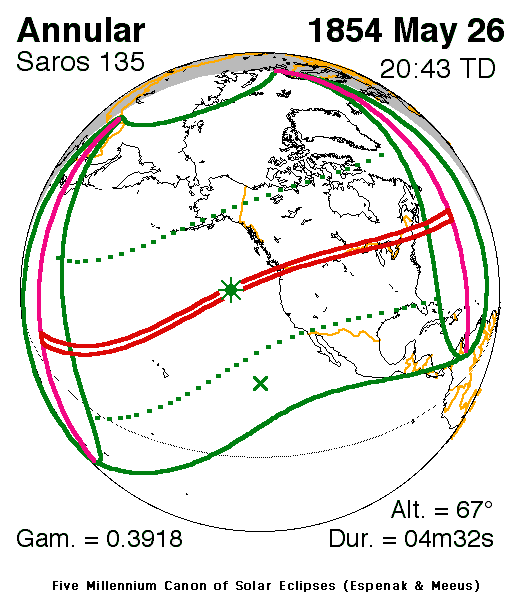
- Map
- Gamma: 0.3918
- Magnitude: 0.9551

Maximum eclipse
- Duration: 272 s (4 min 32 s)
- Coordinates: 43.3°N 140.1°W
- Max. width of band: 178 km (111 mi)

Times (UTC)
- Greatest eclipse: 20:42:53

References
- Saros: 135 (30 of 71)
- Catalog # (SE5000): 9173

An annular solar eclipse occurred at the Moon's ascending node of orbit on Friday, May 26, 1854, with a magnitude of 0.9551. A solar eclipse occurs when the Moon passes between Earth and the Sun, thereby totally or partly obscuring the image of the Sun for a viewer on Earth. An annular solar eclipse occurs when the Moon's apparent diameter is smaller than the Sun's, blocking most of the Sun's light and causing the Sun to look like an annulus (ring). An annular eclipse appears as a partial eclipse over a region of the Earth thousands of kilometres wide. Occurring about 3.2 days before apogee (on May 30, 1854, at 2:25 UTC), the Moon's apparent diameter was smaller.

The path of annularity was visible from parts of the modern-day Marshall Islands, southern Canada, Washington, northern Idaho, northern Montana, northern North Dakota, Minnesota, the upper peninsula of Michigan, New York, Vermont, New Hampshire, Massachusetts, and Maine. A partial solar eclipse was also visible for parts of Northeast Asia, northern Oceania, Hawaii, North America, Central America, the Caribbean, far northern South America, and northern Scandinavia.

== Visibility ==
The annular path crossed close to the boundary between the United States and Canada.

== Observations ==
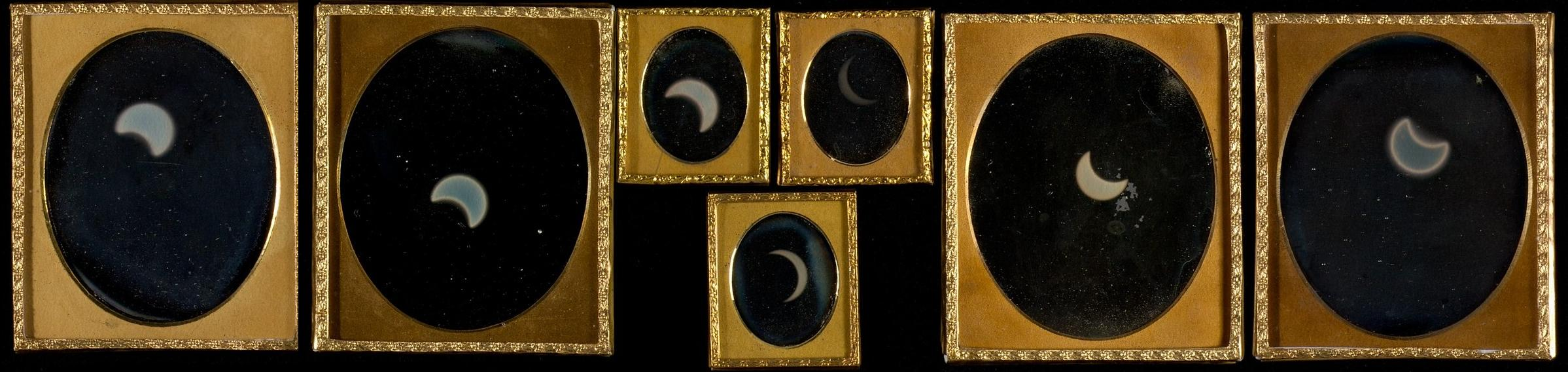
Partiality by Langenheim Brothers.

== Eclipse details ==
Shown below are two tables displaying details about this particular solar eclipse. The first table outlines times at which the Moon's penumbra or umbra attains the specific parameter, and the second table describes various other parameters pertaining to this eclipse.

May 26, 1854 Solar Eclipse Times
| Event | Time (UTC) |
|---|---|
| First Penumbral External Contact | 1854 May 26 at 17:45:31.9 UTC |
| First Umbral External Contact | 1854 May 26 at 18:52:54.1 UTC |
| First Central Line | 1854 May 26 at 18:55:03.1 UTC |
| First Umbral Internal Contact | 1854 May 26 at 18:57:12.6 UTC |
| First Penumbral Internal Contact | 1854 May 26 at 20:20:41.5 UTC |
| Greatest Eclipse | 1854 May 26 at 20:42:52.6 UTC |
| Ecliptic Conjunction | 1854 May 26 at 20:47:29.4 UTC |
| Equatorial Conjunction | 1854 May 26 at 20:56:05.1 UTC |
| Greatest Duration | 1854 May 26 at 20:59:47.7 UTC |
| Last Penumbral Internal Contact | 1854 May 26 at 21:04:43.2 UTC |
| Last Umbral Internal Contact | 1854 May 26 at 22:28:22.6 UTC |
| Last Central Line | 1854 May 26 at 22:30:34.0 UTC |
| Last Umbral External Contact | 1854 May 26 at 22:32:45.0 UTC |
| Last Penumbral External Contact | 1854 May 26 at 23:40:11.8 UTC |

May 26, 1854 Solar Eclipse Parameters
| Parameter | Value |
|---|---|
| Eclipse Magnitude | 0.95510 |
| Eclipse Obscuration | 0.91221 |
| Gamma | 0.39177 |
| Sun Right Ascension | 04h13m05.4s |
| Sun Declination | +21°11'11.2" |
| Sun Semi-Diameter | 15'46.7" |
| Sun Equatorial Horizontal Parallax | 08.7" |
| Moon Right Ascension | 04h12m40.1s |
| Moon Declination | +21°31'39.9" |
| Moon Semi-Diameter | 14'51.7" |
| Moon Equatorial Horizontal Parallax | 0°54'32.6" |
| ΔT | 7.1 s |

== Eclipse season ==
This eclipse is part of an eclipse season, a period, roughly every six months, when eclipses occur. Only two (or occasionally three) eclipse seasons occur each year, and each season lasts about 35 days and repeats just short of six months (173 days) later; thus two full eclipse seasons always occur each year. Either two or three eclipses happen each eclipse season. In the sequence below, each eclipse is separated by a fortnight.

Eclipse season of May 1854
| May 12 Descending node (full moon) | May 26 Ascending node (new moon) |
|---|---|
| Partial lunar eclipse Lunar Saros 109 | Annular solar eclipse Solar Saros 135 |

== Related eclipses ==
=== Eclipses in 1854 ===
- A partial lunar eclipse on May 12.
- An annular solar eclipse on May 26.
- A total lunar eclipse on November 4.
- A hybrid solar eclipse on November 20.

=== Metonic ===
- Preceded by: Solar eclipse of January 21, 1852
- Followed by: Solar eclipse of August 28, 1859

=== Tzolkinex ===
- Preceded by: Solar eclipse of April 15, 1847
- Followed by: Solar eclipse of July 8, 1861

=== Half-Saros ===
- Preceded by: Lunar eclipse of May 21, 1845
- Followed by: Lunar eclipse of June 1, 1863

=== Tritos ===
- Preceded by: Solar eclipse of June 27, 1843
- Followed by: Solar eclipse of April 25, 1865

=== Solar Saros 135 ===
- Preceded by: Solar eclipse of May 15, 1836
- Followed by: Solar eclipse of June 6, 1872

=== Inex ===
- Preceded by: Solar eclipse of June 16, 1825
- Followed by: Solar eclipse of May 6, 1883

=== Triad ===
- Preceded by: Solar eclipse of July 25, 1767
- Followed by: Solar eclipse of March 27, 1941

=== Solar eclipses of 1852–1855 ===
This eclipse is a member of a semester series. An eclipse in a semester series of solar eclipses repeats approximately every 177 days and 4 hours (a semester) at alternating nodes of the Moon's orbit.

The partial solar eclipse on January 21, 1852 occurs in the previous lunar year eclipse set.

Solar eclipse series sets from 1852 to 1855
| Ascending node | | | Descending node | | |
| Saros | Map | Gamma | Saros | Map | Gamma |
| 115 | June 17, 1852 Partial | −1.1111 | 120 | December 11, 1852 Total | 0.8551 |
| 125 | June 6, 1853 Annular | −0.3686 | 130 | November 30, 1853 Total | 0.1763 |
| 135 | May 26, 1854 Annular | 0.3918 | 140 | November 20, 1854 Hybrid | −0.5179 |
| 145 | May 16, 1855 Partial | 1.1249 | 150 | November 9, 1855 Partial | −1.2767 |

=== Saros 135 ===
This eclipse is a part of Saros series 135, repeating every 18 years, 11 days, and containing 71 events. The series started with a partial solar eclipse on July 5, 1331. It contains annular eclipses from October 21, 1511 through February 24, 2305; hybrid eclipses on March 8, 2323 and March 18, 2341; and total eclipses from March 29, 2359 through May 22, 2449. The series ends at member 71 as a partial eclipse on August 17, 2593. Its eclipses are tabulated in three columns; every third eclipse in the same column is one exeligmos apart, so they all cast shadows over approximately the same parts of the Earth.

The longest duration of annularity was produced by member 16 at 10 minutes, 41 seconds on December 24, 1601, and the longest duration of totality will be produced by member 62 at 2 minutes, 27 seconds on May 12, 2431. All eclipses in this series occur at the Moon’s ascending node of orbit.

Series members 28–49 occur between 1801 and 2200:
| 28 | 29 | 30 |
|---|---|---|
| May 5, 1818 | May 15, 1836 | May 26, 1854 |
| 31 | 32 | 33 |
| June 6, 1872 | June 17, 1890 | June 28, 1908 |
| 34 | 35 | 36 |
| July 9, 1926 | July 20, 1944 | July 31, 1962 |
| 37 | 38 | 39 |
| August 10, 1980 | August 22, 1998 | September 1, 2016 |
| 40 | 42 | 42 |
| September 12, 2034 | September 22, 2052 | October 4, 2070 |
| 43 | 44 | 45 |
| October 14, 2088 | October 26, 2106 | November 6, 2124 |
| 46 | 47 | 48 |
| November 17, 2142 | November 27, 2160 | December 9, 2178 |
49
December 19, 2196

=== Metonic series ===
The metonic series repeats eclipses every 19 years (6939.69 days), lasting about 5 cycles. Eclipses occur in nearly the same calendar date. In addition, the octon subseries repeats 1/5 of that or every 3.8 years (1387.94 days). All eclipses in this table occur at the Moon's ascending node.

25 eclipse events between March 14, 1801 and August 7, 1888
| March 14–15 | December 31–January 1 | October 19–20 | August 7 | May 26–27 |
| 107 | 109 | 111 | 113 | 115 |
|---|---|---|---|---|
| March 14, 1801 | January 1, 1805 | October 19, 1808 | August 7, 1812 | May 27, 1816 |
| 117 | 119 | 121 | 123 | 125 |
| March 14, 1820 | January 1, 1824 | October 20, 1827 | August 7, 1831 | May 27, 1835 |
| 127 | 129 | 131 | 133 | 135 |
| March 15, 1839 | December 31, 1842 | October 20, 1846 | August 7, 1850 | May 26, 1854 |
| 137 | 139 | 141 | 143 | 145 |
| March 15, 1858 | December 31, 1861 | October 19, 1865 | August 7, 1869 | May 26, 1873 |
| 147 | 149 | 151 | 153 | |
| March 15, 1877 | December 31, 1880 | October 19, 1884 | August 7, 1888 | |

=== Tritos series ===
This eclipse is a part of a tritos cycle, repeating at alternating nodes every 135 synodic months (≈ 3986.63 days, or 11 years minus 1 month). Their appearance and longitude are irregular due to a lack of synchronization with the anomalistic month (period of perigee), but groupings of 3 tritos cycles (≈ 33 years minus 3 months) come close (≈ 434.044 anomalistic months), so eclipses are similar in these groupings.

The partial solar eclipses on December 7, 2170 (part of Saros 164) and November 7, 2181 (part of Saros 165) are also a part of this series but are not included in the table below.

Series members between 1801 and 2105
| September 28, 1810 (Saros 131) | August 27, 1821 (Saros 132) | July 27, 1832 (Saros 133) | June 27, 1843 (Saros 134) | May 26, 1854 (Saros 135) |
| April 25, 1865 (Saros 136) | March 25, 1876 (Saros 137) | February 22, 1887 (Saros 138) | January 22, 1898 (Saros 139) | December 23, 1908 (Saros 140) |
| November 22, 1919 (Saros 141) | October 21, 1930 (Saros 142) | September 21, 1941 (Saros 143) | August 20, 1952 (Saros 144) | July 20, 1963 (Saros 145) |
| June 20, 1974 (Saros 146) | May 19, 1985 (Saros 147) | April 17, 1996 (Saros 148) | March 19, 2007 (Saros 149) | February 15, 2018 (Saros 150) |
| January 14, 2029 (Saros 151) | December 15, 2039 (Saros 152) | November 14, 2050 (Saros 153) | October 13, 2061 (Saros 154) | September 12, 2072 (Saros 155) |
| August 13, 2083 (Saros 156) | July 12, 2094 (Saros 157) | June 12, 2105 (Saros 158) | | |

=== Inex series ===
This eclipse is a part of the long period inex cycle, repeating at alternating nodes, every 358 synodic months (≈ 10,571.95 days, or 29 years minus 20 days). Their appearance and longitude are irregular due to a lack of synchronization with the anomalistic month (period of perigee). However, groupings of 3 inex cycles (≈ 87 years minus 2 months) comes close (≈ 1,151.02 anomalistic months), so eclipses are similar in these groupings.

Series members between 1801 and 2200
| June 16, 1825 (Saros 134) | May 26, 1854 (Saros 135) | May 6, 1883 (Saros 136) |
| April 17, 1912 (Saros 137) | March 27, 1941 (Saros 138) | March 7, 1970 (Saros 139) |
| February 16, 1999 (Saros 140) | January 26, 2028 (Saros 141) | January 5, 2057 (Saros 142) |
| December 16, 2085 (Saros 143) | November 27, 2114 (Saros 144) | November 7, 2143 (Saros 145) |
| October 17, 2172 (Saros 146) | | |
