= Solar Saros 135 =

Series of solar eclipses

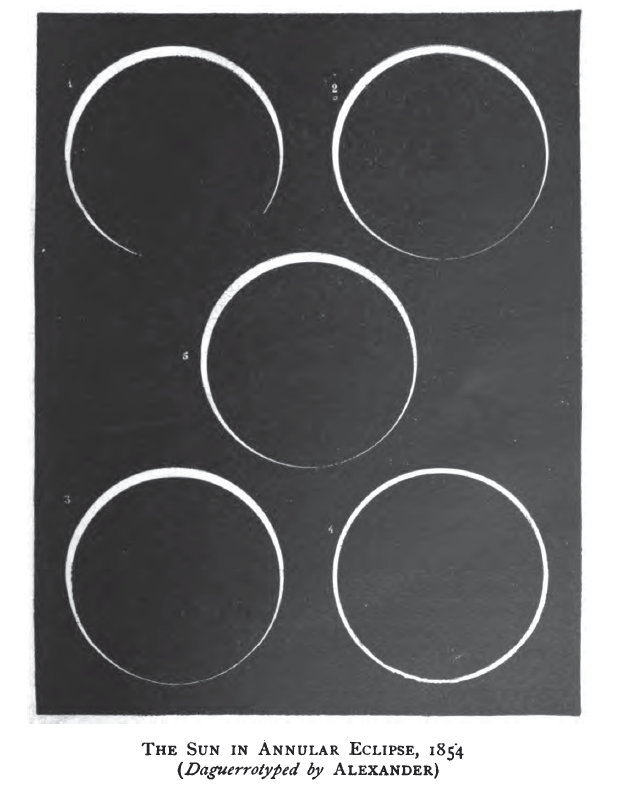
Annularity May 26, 1854 Series member 30

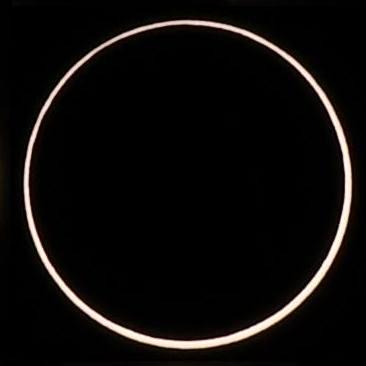
Annularity September 1, 2016 Series member 39

Historic saros cycle animation

Saros cycle series 135 for solar eclipses occurs at the Moon's ascending node, repeating every 18 years, 11 days, containing 71 eclipses, including 53 umbral eclipses (45 annular, 2 hybrid, 6 total). The longest duration of totality will be 2 minutes, 27 seconds on May 12, 2431 while the longest annular was 10 minutes 14 seconds on December 24, 1601.

This solar saros is linked to Lunar Saros 128.

This series included the smallest annular solar eclipse in the 2nd millennium on December 24, 1601, with an eclipse magnitude of only 0.90785, just 0.002% larger than the solar eclipse of November 12, 1683 BCE, which was the smallest annular solar eclipse of thousands of years, with an eclipse magnitude of only 0.90783.

The factors that made this such a small annular solar eclipse were:

- The Earth being very near perihelion (closest approach from the Sun in its elliptical orbit, making its angular diameter nearly as large as possible). This occurred on December 28, 1601.
- The Moon being nearly exactly at apogee (making its angular diameter as small as possible). The moment of greatest eclipse was just half a day after apogee.
- The midpoint of the eclipse occurring when the Sun was close to the horizon (increasing the distance to the Moon by a greater percentage than the distance to the Sun).

== Umbral eclipses ==
Umbral eclipses (annular, total and hybrid) can be further classified as either: 1) Central (two limits), 2) Central (one limit) or 3) Non-Central (one limit). The statistical distribution of these classes in Saros series 135 appears in the following table.

Classification	Number	Percent
All Umbral eclipses	53	100.00%
Central (two limits)	51	96.23%
Central (one limit)	1	1.89%
Non-central (one limit)	1	1.89%

Series members 27–43 occurring between 1800 and 2100:
27	28	29
Apr 24, 1800	May 5, 1818	May 15, 1836
30	31	32
May 26, 1854	Jun 6, 1872	Jun 17, 1890
33	34	35
Jun 28, 1908	Jul 9, 1926	Jul 20, 1944
36	37	38
Jul 31, 1962	Aug 10, 1980	Aug 22, 1998
39	40	41
Sep 1, 2016	Sep 12, 2034	Sep 22, 2052
42	43	
Oct 4, 2070	Oct 14, 2088	

== All eclipses ==
Note: Dates are given in the Julian calendar prior to 15 October 1582, and in the Gregorian calendar after that.

Saros	Member	Date	Time (Greatest) UTC	Type	Location Lat, Long	Gamma	Mag.	Width (km)	Duration (min:sec)	Ref
135	1	July 5, 1331	22:46:38	Partial	67.8N 12.6E	1.5532	0.0063			
135	2	July 16, 1349	5:25:45	Partial	68.8N 98.7W	1.4782	0.1384			
135	3	July 27, 1367	12:05:47	Partial	69.7N 149.3E	1.4043	0.2679			
135	4	August 6, 1385	18:51:40	Partial	70.6N 35.3E	1.3352	0.3878			
135	5	August 18, 1403	1:41:42	Partial	71.3N 80.4W	1.2697	0.5006			
135	6	August 28, 1421	8:38:54	Partial	71.8N 161.6E	1.2101	0.6025			
135	7	September 8, 1439	15:42:20	Partial	72.1N 41.6E	1.1555	0.6947			
135	8	September 18, 1457	22:54:59	Partial	72.1N 80.8W	1.1083	0.7737			
135	9	September 30, 1475	6:15:14	Partial	71.9N 154.9E	1.0676	0.8411			
135	10	October 10, 1493	13:43:35	Partial	71.4N 28.8E	1.0334	0.8969			
135	11	October 21, 1511	21:19:49	Annular (Note: Non-central)	70.7N 98.6W	1.0058	0.9416	-	-	
135	12	November 1, 1529	5:04:11	Annular (Note: No northern limit)	61.7N 122.8E	0.9846	0.9119	-	8m 9s	
135	13	November 12, 1547	12:54:24	Annular	55.5N 4.7W	0.9683	0.9106	1419	8m 59s	
135	14	November 22, 1565	20:49:55	Annular	51.4N 130.5W	0.9564	0.9092	1220	9m 37s	
135	15	December 14, 1583	4:48:39	Annular	48.5N 104.1E	0.9471	0.9083	1116	10m 3s	
135	16	December 24, 1601	12:50:31	Annular	46.6N 21.5W	0.9402	0.9078	1051	10m 14s	
135	17	January 4, 1620	20:51:05	Annular	45N 146.5W	0.9321	0.9081	976	10m 13s	
135	18	January 15, 1638	4:51:53	Annular	44N 88.9E	0.9242	0.909	907	10m 0s	
135	19	January 26, 1656	12:48:10	Annular	43.2N 34.1W	0.9122	0.9106	820	9m 38s	
135	20	February 5, 1674	20:41:35	Annular	42.8N 155.7W	0.8979	0.9129	736	9m 9s	
135	21	February 17, 1692	4:26:56	Annular	42.4N 85.6E	0.8765	0.9159	644	8m 36s	
135	22	February 28, 1710	12:07:29	Annular	42.5N 31.2W	0.8509	0.9194	562	8m 0s	
135	23	March 10, 1728	19:38:56	Annular	42.8N 144.6W	0.8172	0.9233	485	7m 25s	
135	24	March 22, 1746	3:02:49	Annular	43.5N 104.7E	0.7771	0.9277	419	6m 51s	
135	25	April 1, 1764	10:17:15	Annular	44.2N 2.5W	0.7288	0.9323	361	6m 20s	
135	26	April 12, 1782	17:24:47	Annular	45.1N 107.1W	0.6745	0.937	311	5m 51s	
135	27	April 24, 1800	0:24:00	Annular	45.7N 151.3E	0.6125	0.9417	269	5m 27s	
135	28	May 5, 1818	7:15:49	Annular	45.8N 52.5E	0.544	0.9464	233	5m 5s	
135	29	May 15, 1836	14:01:39	Annular	45.1N 44.4W	0.47	0.9509	203	4m 47s	
135	30	May 26, 1854	20:42:53	Annular	43.3N 140.1W	0.3918	0.9551	178	4m 32s	
135	31	June 6, 1872	3:20:03	Annular	40.5N 124.8E	0.3095	0.959	157	4m 20s	
135	32	June 17, 1890	9:55:05	Annular	36.5N 29.3E	0.2246	0.9625	140	4m 9s	
135	33	June 28, 1908	16:29:51	Annular	31.4N 67.2W	0.1389	0.9655	126	4m 0s	
135	34	July 9, 1926	23:06:02	Annular	25.6N 165.1W	0.0538	0.968	115	3m 51s	
135	35	July 20, 1944	5:43:13	Annular	19N 95.7E	-0.0314	0.97	108	3m 42s	
135	36	July 31, 1962	12:25:33	Annular	12N 5.7W	-0.113	0.9716	103	3m 33s	
135	37	August 10, 1980	19:12:21	Annular	4.6N 108.9W	-0.1915	0.9727	100	3m 23s	
135	38	August 22, 1998	2:07:11	Annular	3S 145.4E	-0.2644	0.9734	99	3m 14s	
135	39	September 1, 2016	9:08:02	Annular	10.7S 37.8E	-0.333	0.9736	100	3m 6s	
135	40	September 12, 2034	16:19:28	Annular	18.2S 72.6W	-0.3936	0.9736	102	2m 58s	
135	41	September 22, 2052	23:39:10	Annular	25.7S 175E	-0.448	0.9734	106	2m 51s	
135	42	October 4, 2070	7:08:57	Annular	32.8S 60.4E	-0.495	0.9731	110	2m 44s	
135	43	October 14, 2088	14:48:05	Annular	39.7S 56W	-0.5349	0.9727	115	2m 38s	
135	44	October 26, 2106	22:37:40	Annular	45.9S 174.1W	-0.5671	0.9725	119	2m 32s	
135	45	November 6, 2124	6:36:34	Annular	51.6S 66.8E	-0.5921	0.9724	123	2m 26s	
135	46	November 17, 2142	14:43:08	Annular	56.4S 52.4W	-0.6117	0.9727	124	2m 19s	
135	47	November 27, 2160	22:58:32	Annular	60.1S 171.6W	-0.6247	0.9734	123	2m 12s	
135	48	December 9, 2178	7:20:03	Annular	62.4S 69.9E	-0.6338	0.9745	118	2m 3s	
135	49	December 19, 2196	15:47:09	Annular	63.1S 48.6W	-0.6387	0.9761	111	1m 53s	
135	50	January 1, 2215	0:16:36	Annular	62.3S 168W	-0.6427	0.9783	101	1m 41s	
135	51	January 11, 2233	8:49:17	Annular	60S 70.4E	-0.6447	0.9811	88	1m 28s	
135	52	January 22, 2251	17:21:41	Annular	56.9S 53.2W	-0.648	0.9844	72	1m 12s	
135	53	February 2, 2269	1:53:06	Annular	53.2S 178.2W	-0.6529	0.9883	54	0m 54s	
135	54	February 13, 2287	10:21:25	Annular	49.4S 56.3E	-0.6613	0.9926	34	0m 35s	
135	55	February 24, 2305	18:46:09	Annular	45.7S 69.3W	-0.6732	0.9973	13	0m 13s	
135	56	March 8, 2323	3:05:10	Hybrid	42.4S 166.1E	-0.6906	1.0023	11	0m 11s	
135	57	March 18, 2341	11:18:20	Hybrid	39.8S 42.6E	-0.7137	1.0075	36	0m 36s	
135	58	March 29, 2359	19:24:46	Total	37.9S 79.3W	-0.7429	1.0128	64	1m 2s	
135	59	April 9, 2377	3:25:10	Total	37.1S 160.2E	-0.7779	1.018	96	1m 28s	
135	60	April 20, 2395	11:17:15	Total	37.7S 41.9E	-0.8203	1.023	134	1m 52s	
135	61	April 30, 2413	19:03:57	Total	40S 75W	-0.8677	1.0274	183	2m 13s	
135	62	May 12, 2431	2:43:30	Total	44.8S 170.4E	-0.9214	1.031	267	2m 27s	
135	63	May 22, 2449	10:19:15	Total	54.4S 59.1E	-0.979	1.0328	567	2m 24s	
135	64	June 2, 2467	17:48:24	Partial	64.5S 50.8W	-1.0425	0.9315			
135	65	June 13, 2485	1:16:18	Partial	65.4S 172.3W	-1.1075	0.8095			
135	66	June 25, 2503	8:40:22	Partial	66.4S 66.7E	-1.1759	0.68			
135	67	July 5, 2521	16:04:53	Partial	67.4S 54.7W	-1.2445	0.5492			
135	68	July 16, 2539	23:27:49	Partial	68.3S 176.3W	-1.3148	0.4143			
135	69	July 27, 2557	6:54:08	Partial	69.3S 60.9E	-1.3827	0.2835			
135	70	August 7, 2575	14:21:38	Partial	70.1S 62.9W	-1.4499	0.1541			
135	71	August 17, 2593	21:53:04	Partial	70.8S 171.9E	-1.5141	0.0303			
