= 2014 lunar eclipse =

2014 lunar eclipse may refer to:

- April 2014 lunar eclipse
- October 2014 lunar eclipse
