= Solar eclipse of October 23, 2014 =

21st-century partial solar eclipse

- Partial eclipse
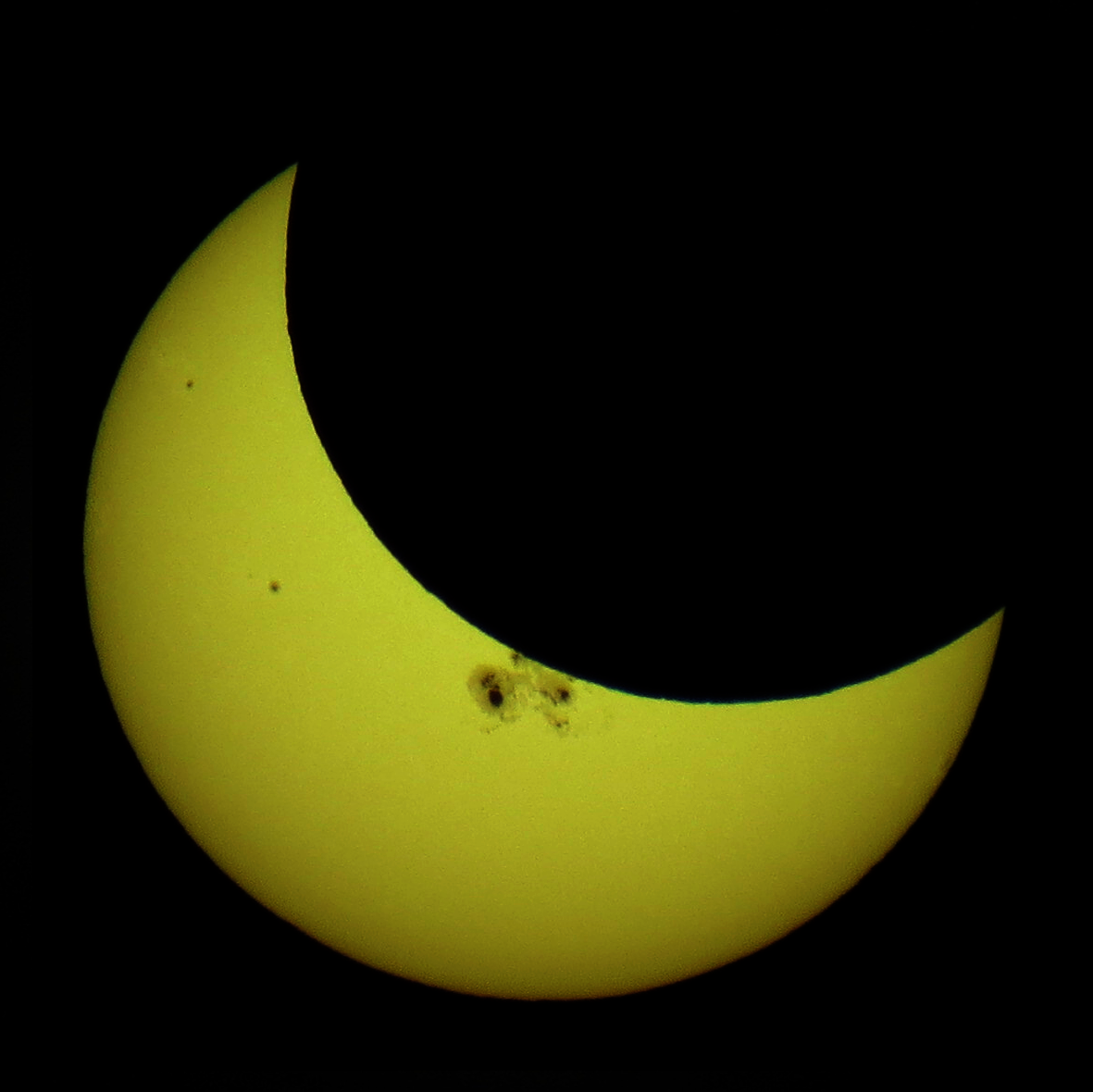
- From Minneapolis, near greatest eclipse

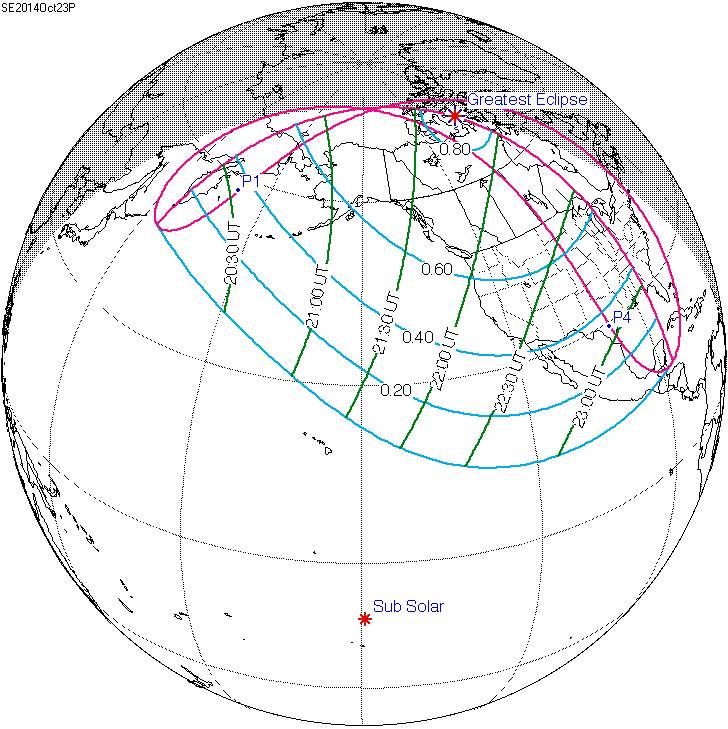
- Map
- Gamma: 1.0908
- Magnitude: 0.8114

Maximum eclipse
- Coordinates: 71.2°N 97.2°W

Times (UTC)
- (P1) Partial begin: 19:37:30
- Greatest eclipse: 21:45:39
- (P4) Partial end: 23:51:36

References
- Saros: 153 (9 of 70)
- Catalog # (SE5000): 9540

A partial solar eclipse occurred at the Moon's ascending node of orbit on Thursday, October 23, 2014, with a magnitude of 0.8114. A solar eclipse occurs when the Moon passes between Earth and the Sun, thereby totally or partly obscuring the image of the Sun for a viewer on Earth. A partial solar eclipse occurs in the polar regions of the Earth when the center of the Moon's shadow misses the Earth.

== Viewing ==
The center of the Moon's shadow missed the Earth, passing above the North Pole, but a partial eclipse was visible at sunrise (October 24 local time) in far eastern Russia, and before sunset (October 23) across most of North America.

Animated path

== Eclipse timing ==
=== Places experiencing partial eclipse ===
Solar Eclipse of October 23, 2014 (Local Times)
Country or territory	City or place	Start of partial eclipse	Maximum eclipse	End of partial eclipse	Duration of eclipse (hr:min)	Maximum coverage
Russia	Anadyr (Note: The times listed for this location occur on October 24, 2014, local time.)	07:41:15	08:44:33	09:50:52	2:10	40.25%
United States	Anchorage	11:54:44	13:10:55	14:28:27	2:34	54.83%
United States	Boston	17:47:00	17:48:29	17:49:59 (sunset)	0:03	0.28%
Canada	Montreal	17:38:24	17:52:01	17:55:12 (sunset)	0:17	7.87%
Canada	Baker Lake	15:44:02	16:57:33	17:35:38 (sunset)	1:52	73.16%
United States	Seattle	13:34:59	15:00:13	16:19:39	2:45	54.56%
Canada	Ottawa	17:37:21	18:00:41	18:03:51 (sunset)	0:27	16.67%
United States	New York City	17:49:25	18:01:11	18:04:07 (sunset)	0:15	5.89%
Canada	Edmonton	14:40:32	16:02:19	17:18:22	2:38	64.24%
Canada	Calgary	14:43:09	16:05:46	17:22:05	2:39	61.32%
United States	Philadelphia	17:50:35	18:06:52	18:09:45 (sunset)	0:19	9.17%
United States	San Francisco	13:51:35	15:15:24	16:31:46	2:40	39.01%
United States	Washington, D.C.	17:51:59	18:15:47	18:18:38 (sunset)	0:27	14.90%
Canada	Toronto	17:39:00	18:17:33	18:21:20 (sunset)	0:42	30.49%
United States	Salt Lake City	15:04:38	16:25:47	17:38:36	2:34	46.56%
United States	Los Angeles	14:08:11	15:28:03	16:39:40	2:31	33.48%
United States	Las Vegas	14:08:58	15:29:11	16:40:55	2:32	37.93%
United States	Detroit	17:39:13	18:30:31	18:37:56 (sunset)	0:59	39.11%
Mexico	Tijuana	14:14:31	15:32:19	16:41:51	2:27	30.83%
Mexico	Mexicali	14:17:16	15:34:26	16:43:15	2:26	31.28%
United States	Phoenix	14:21:29	15:37:39	16:45:23	2:24	33.10%
United States	Chicago	16:36:04	17:42:59	17:56:54 (sunset)	1:21	44.29%
United States	Miami	18:27:20	18:43:35	18:46:02 (sunset)	0:19	4.61%
Mexico	Hermosillo	14:35:58	15:45:49	16:47:56	2:12	24.53%
United States	Indianapolis	17:42:34	18:46:56	18:53:56 (sunset)	1:11	39.69%
United States	Atlanta	17:59:34	18:51:32	18:54:19 (sunset)	0:55	26.43%
United States	Dallas	16:48:13	17:52:57	18:45:03 (sunset)	1:57	29.50%
Cuba	Havana	18:35:25	18:54:53	18:57:16 (sunset)	0:22	4.12%
United States	New Orleans	17:04:38	18:00:11	18:21:15 (sunset)	1:17	21.40%
Mexico	Mexico City	17:31:43	18:08:56	18:43:33	1:12	4.84%

== Gallery ==
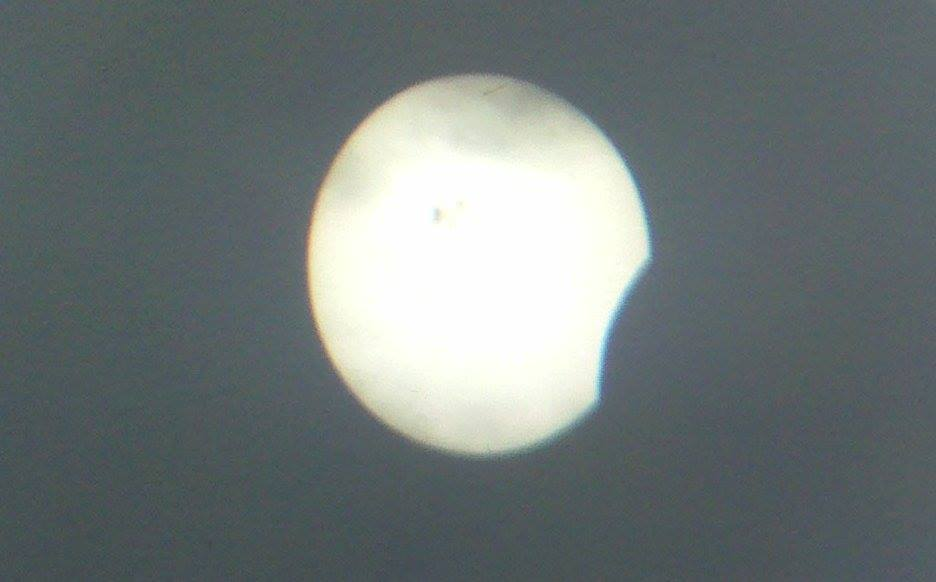
Photograph of the eclipse projected with binoculars in Puebla, Mexico

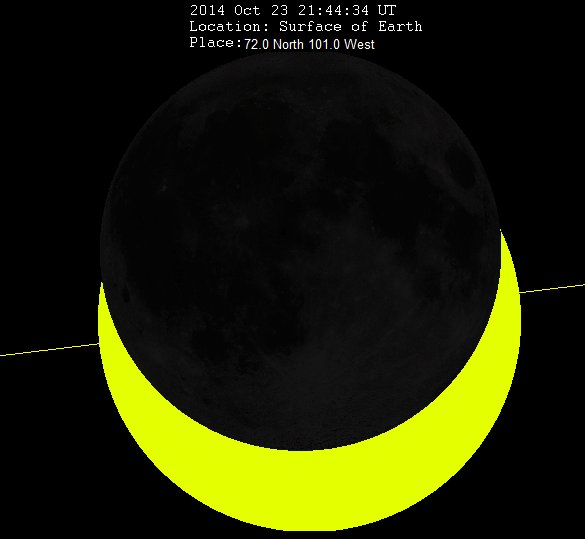
Simulated greatest partiality from Nunavut, Canada at sunset

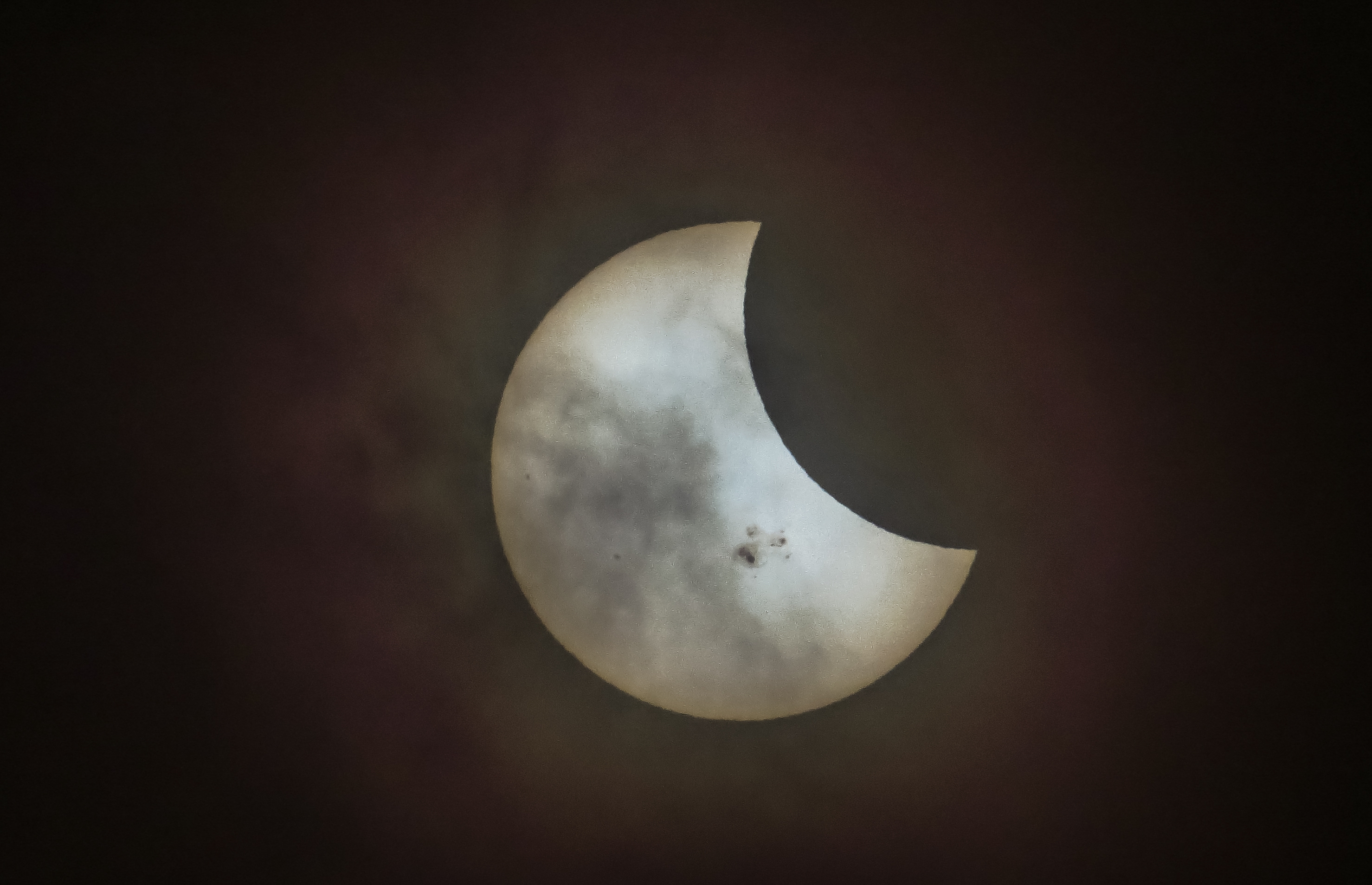
Seattle, Washington, 21:21 UTC

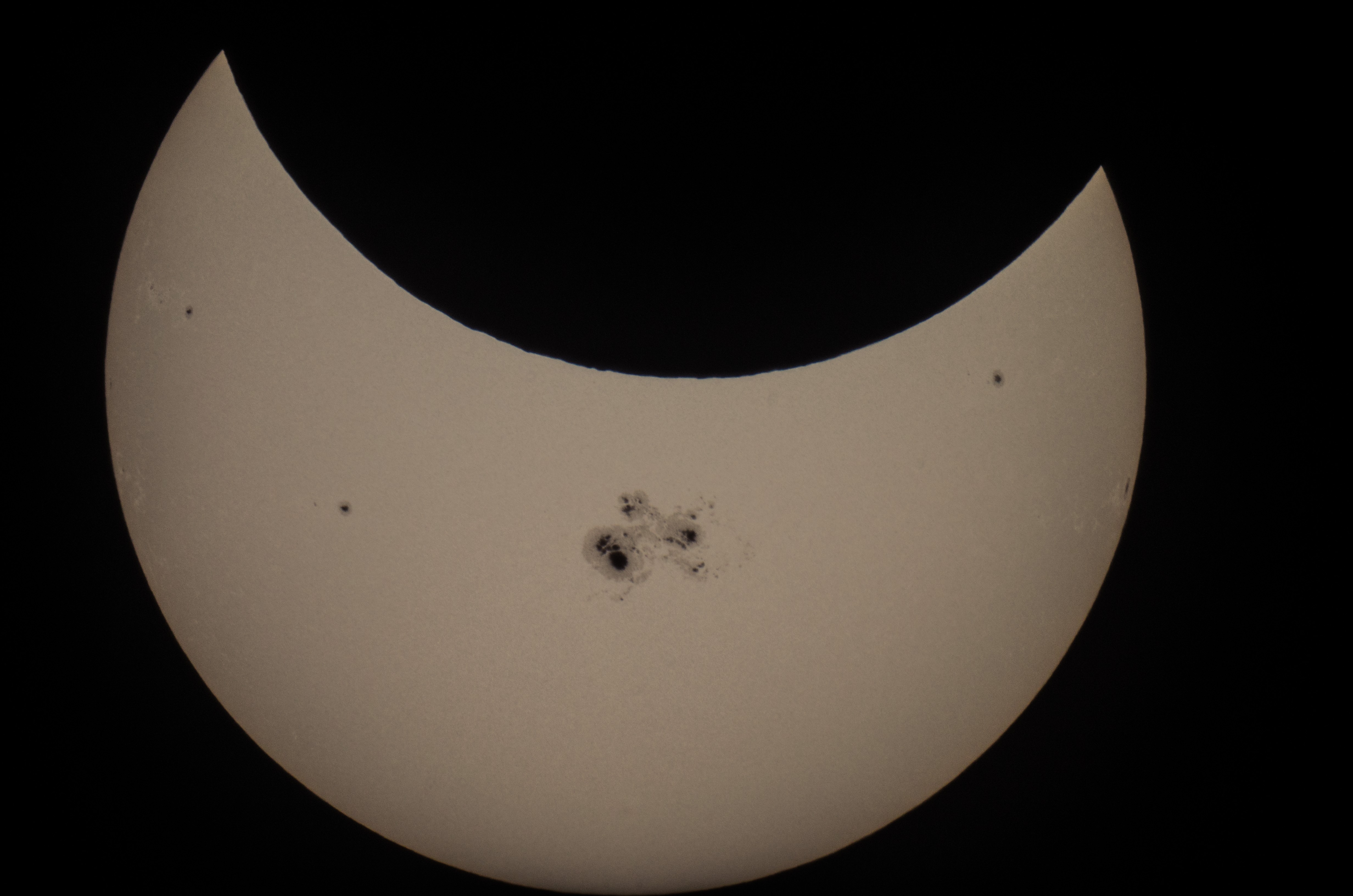
San Jose, California, 21:26 UTC. The eclipse coincided with giant sunspot region 2192, the largest seen in 24 years.

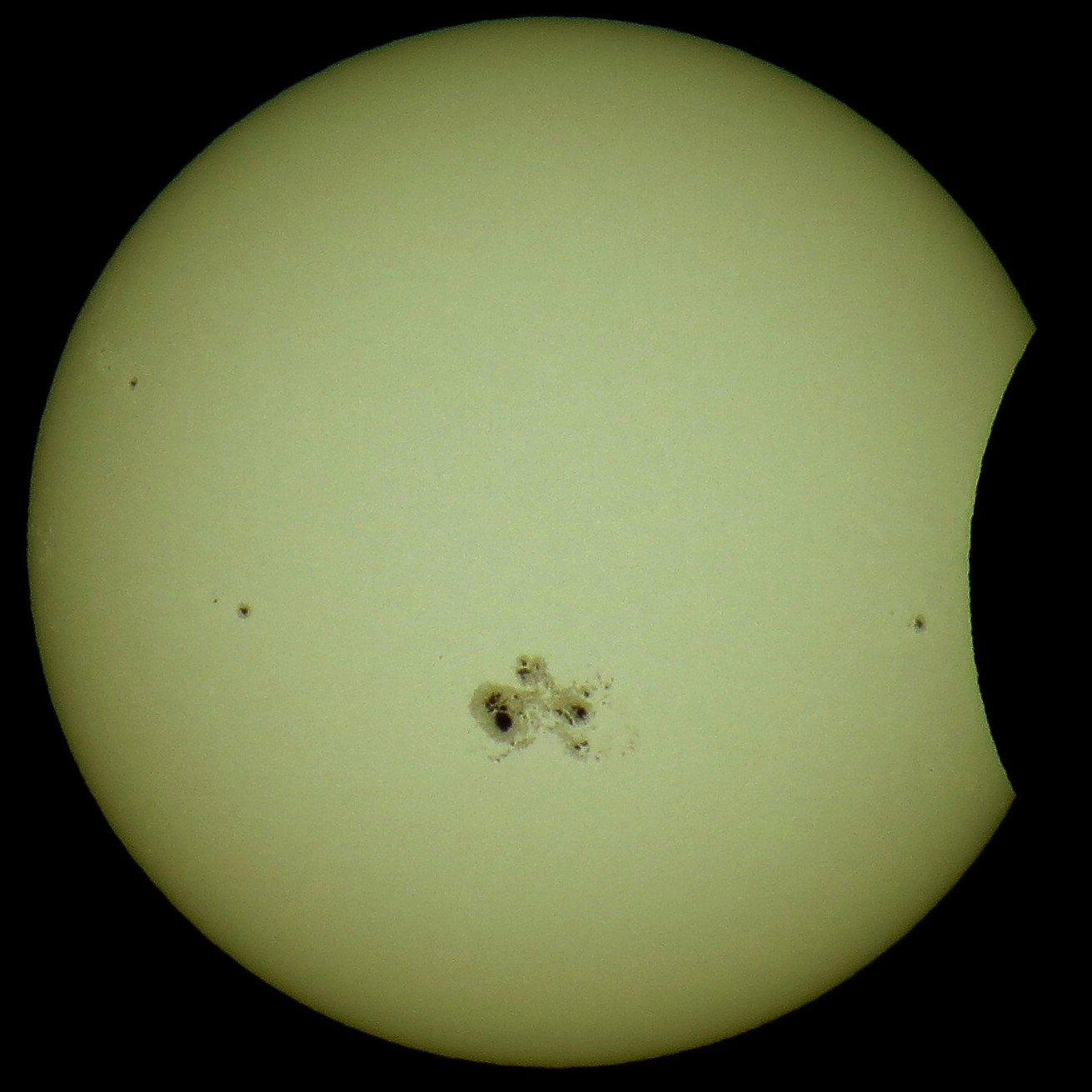
Minneapolis, Minnesota at 21:34 UTC

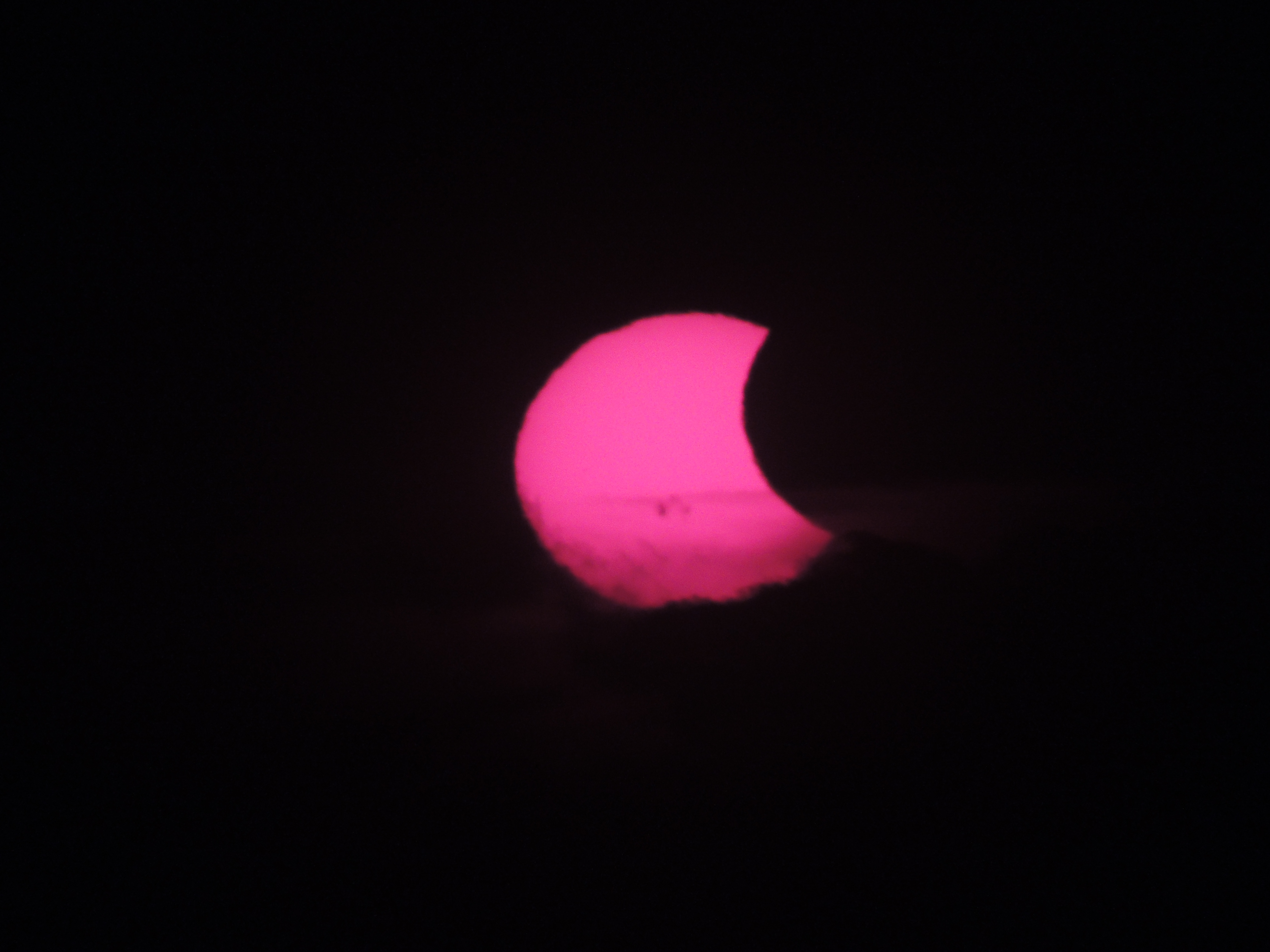
Buchanan, Virginia, 21:44 UTC

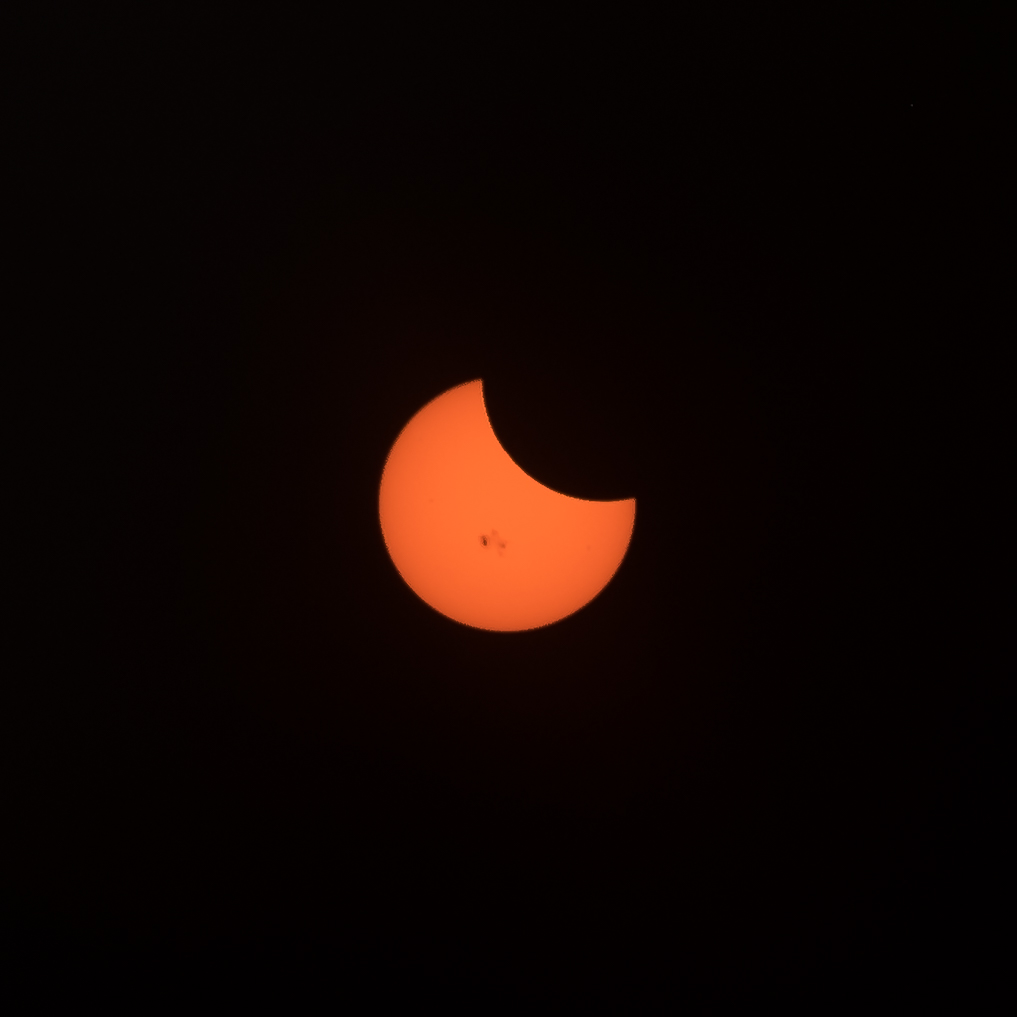
Austin, Texas, 22:00 UTC

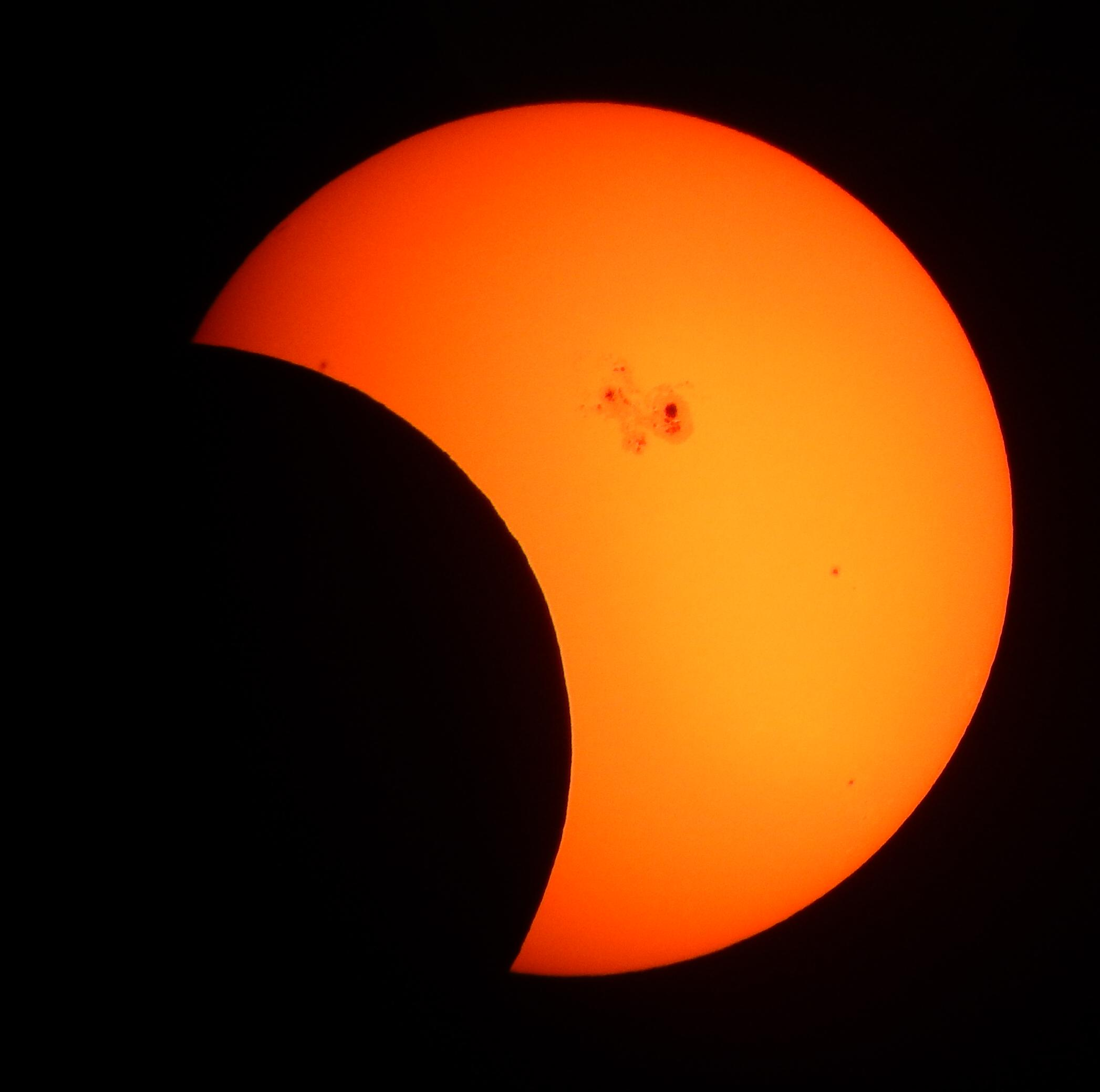
Joshua Tree National Park, 22:14 UTC

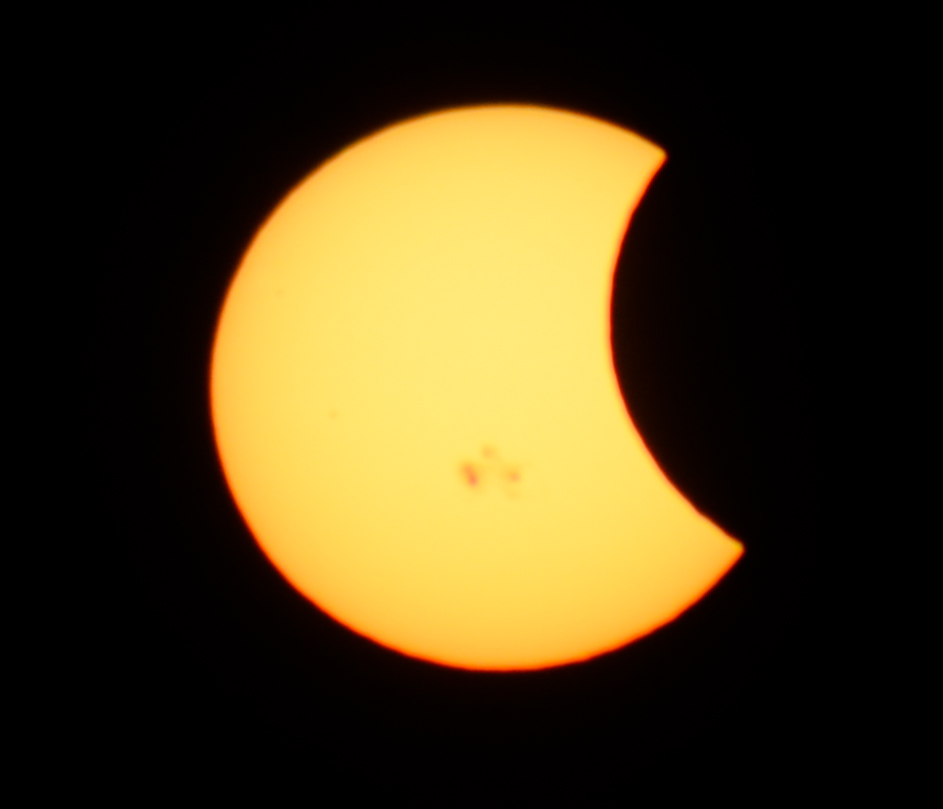
Mentor, Ohio, 22:15 UTC

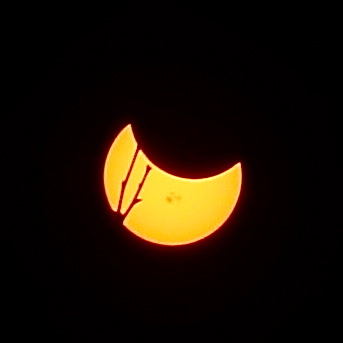
Los Altos, California, 22:16 UTC

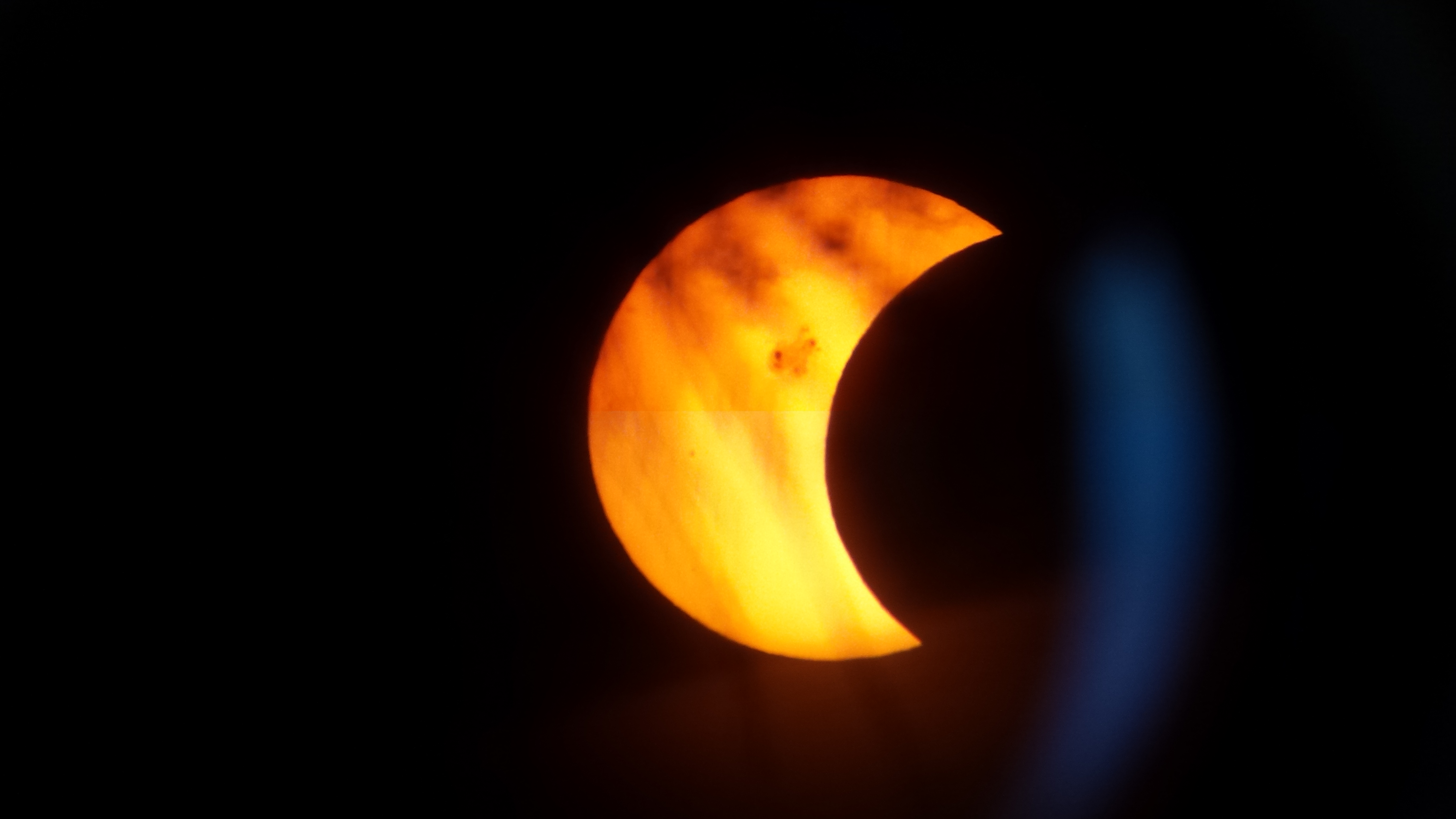
College of DuPage, 22:28 UTC

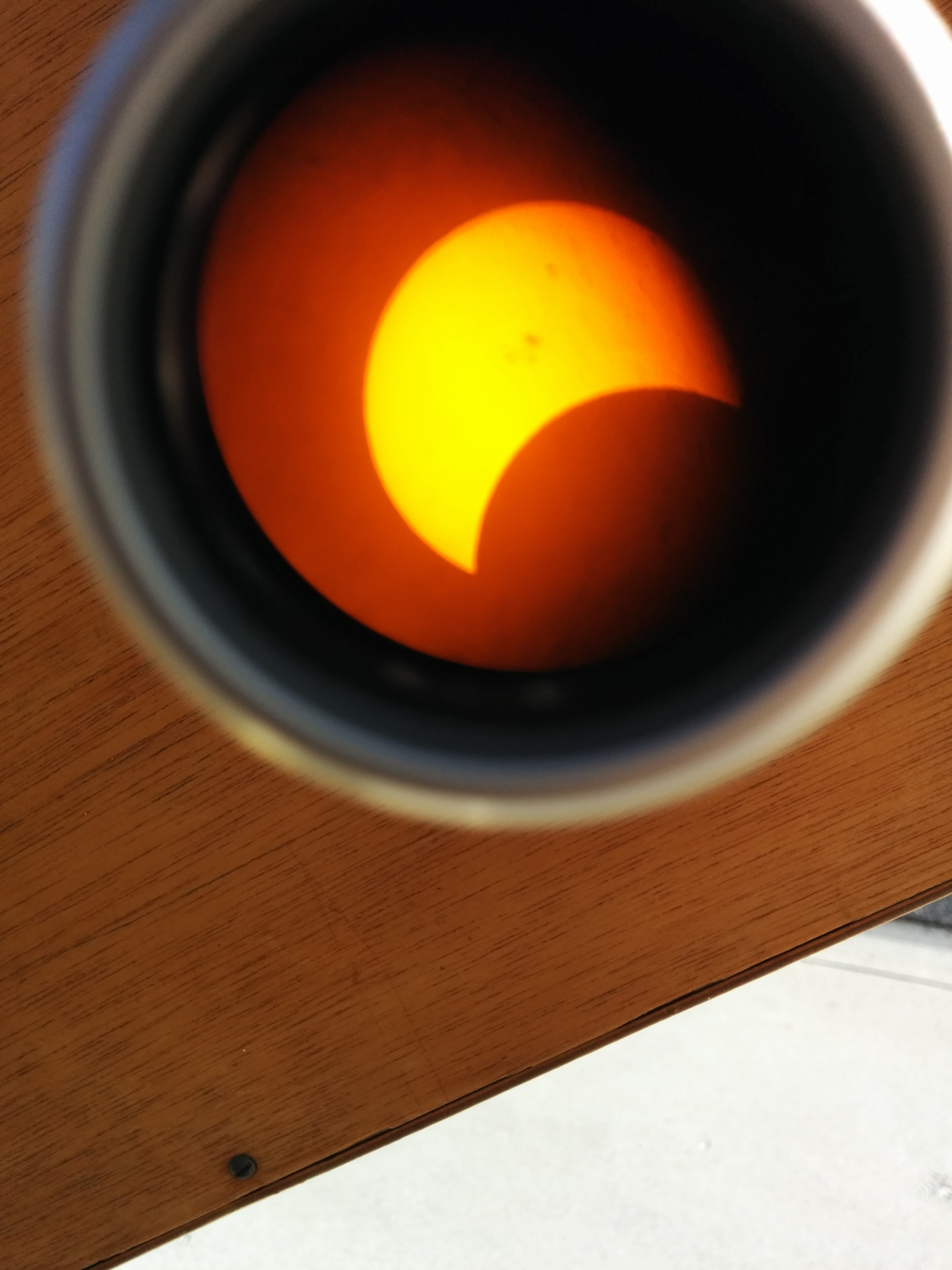
Mountain View, California, 22:33 UTC

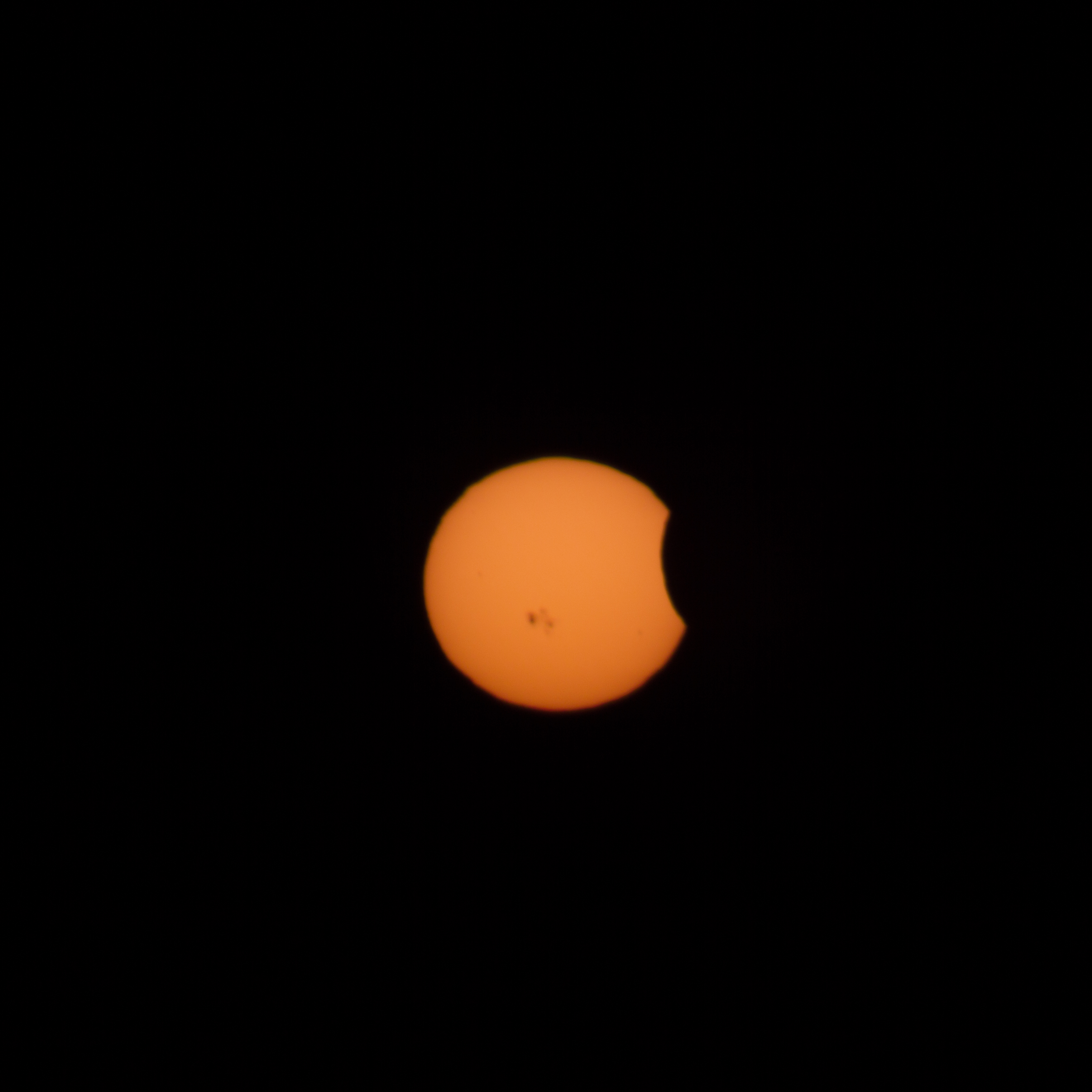
Melbourne, Florida, 22:38 UTC

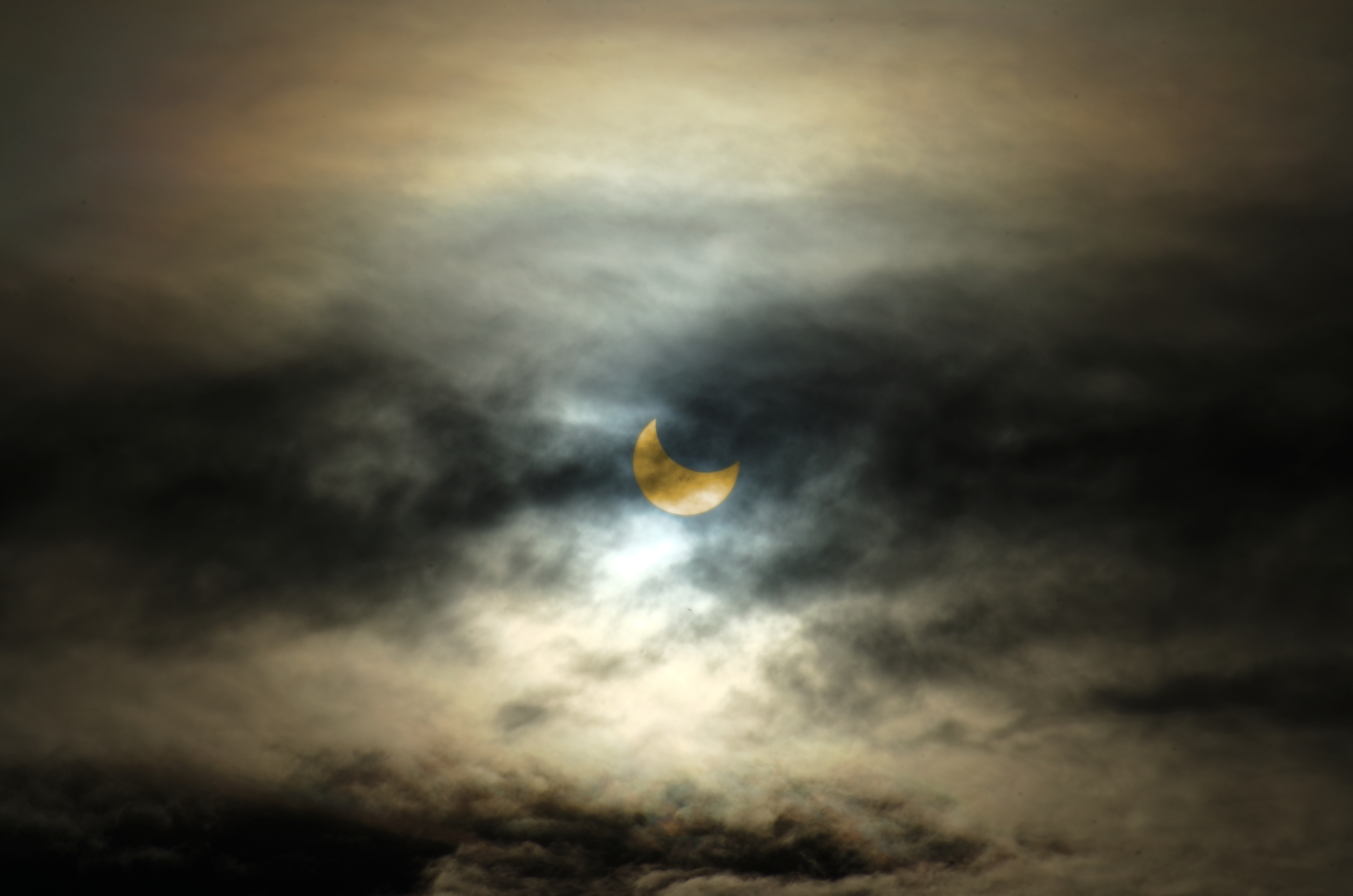
Denver, Colorado, 22:40 UTC

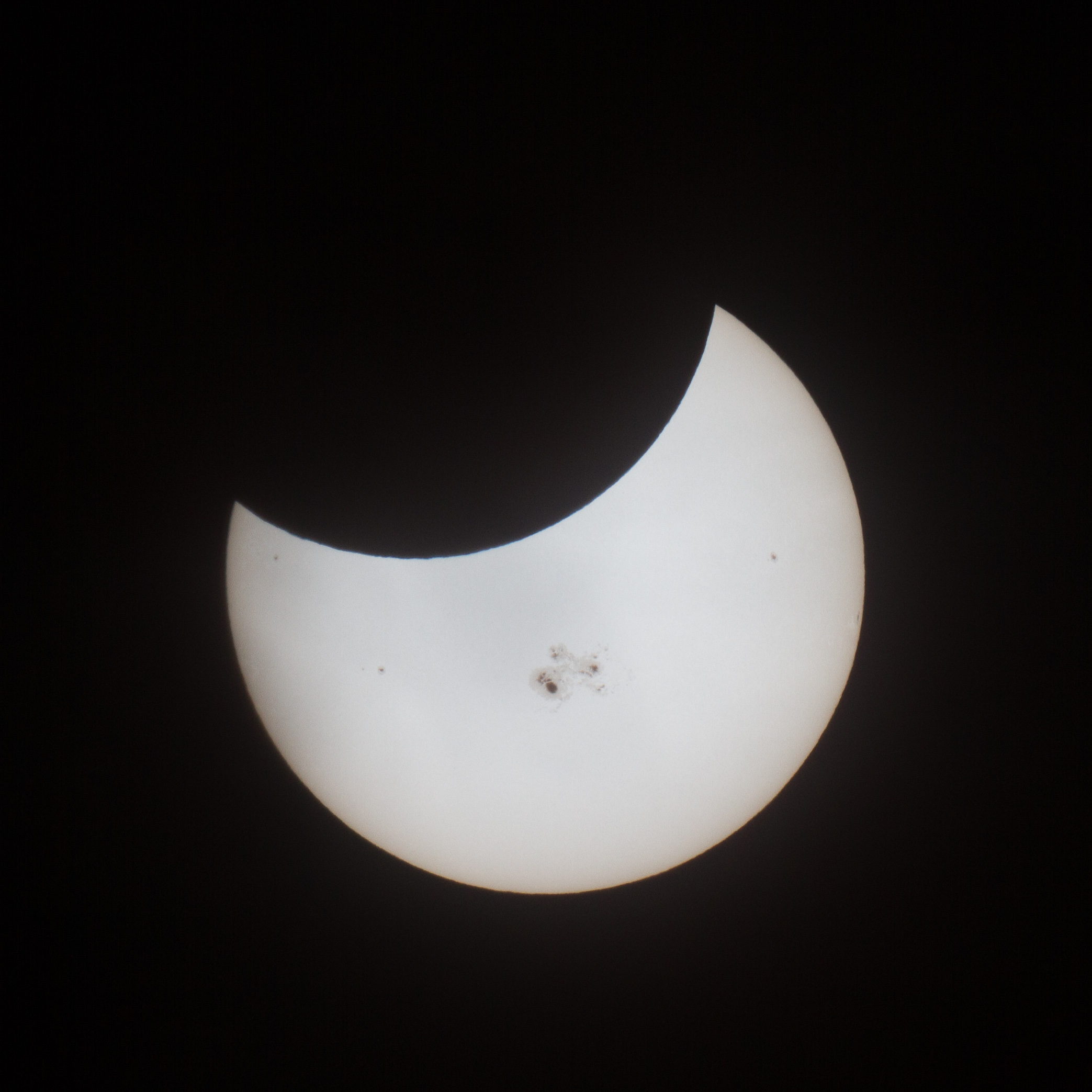
Palo Alto, California, 22:42 UTC

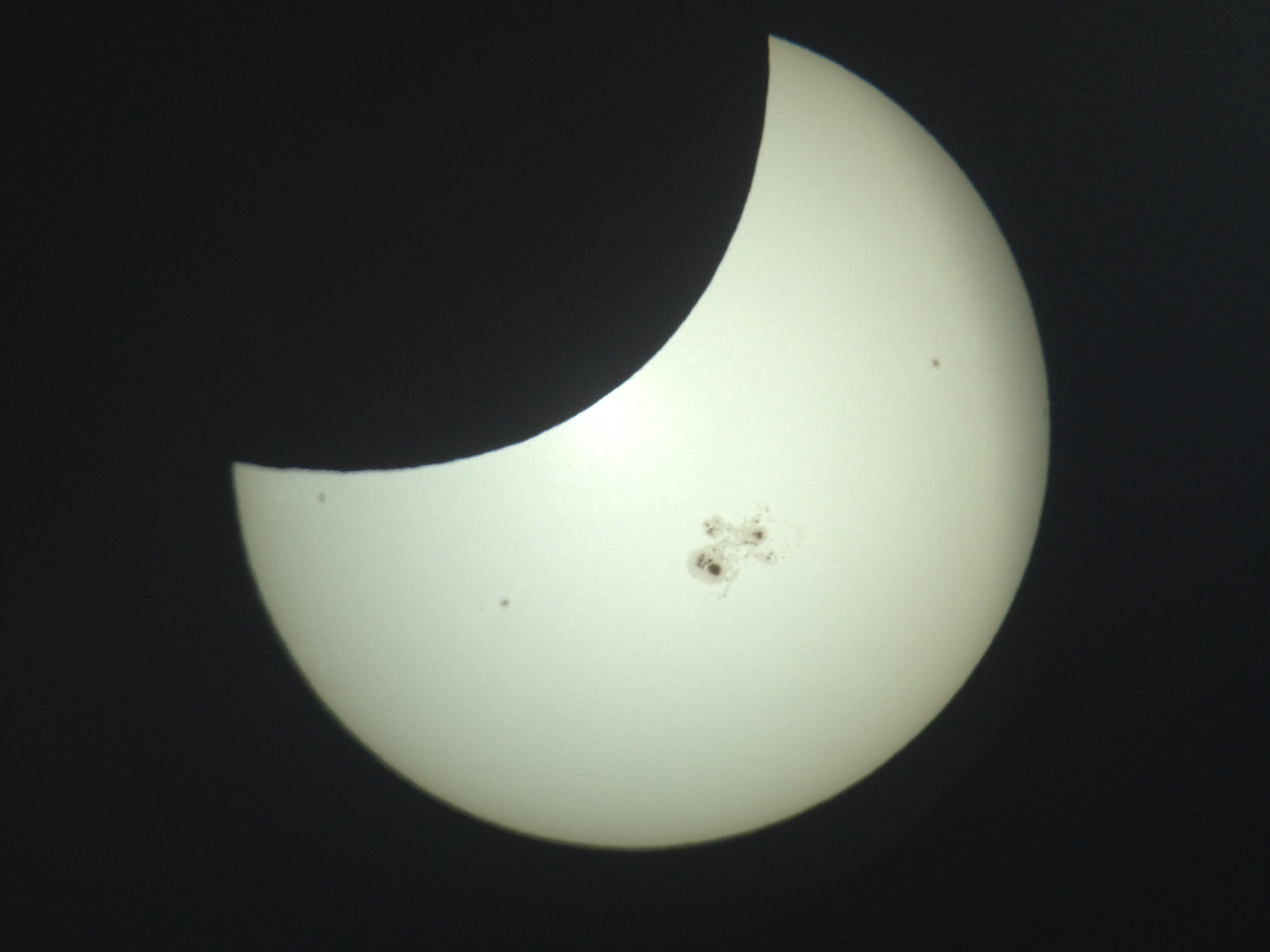
Cupertino, California, 22:47 UTC

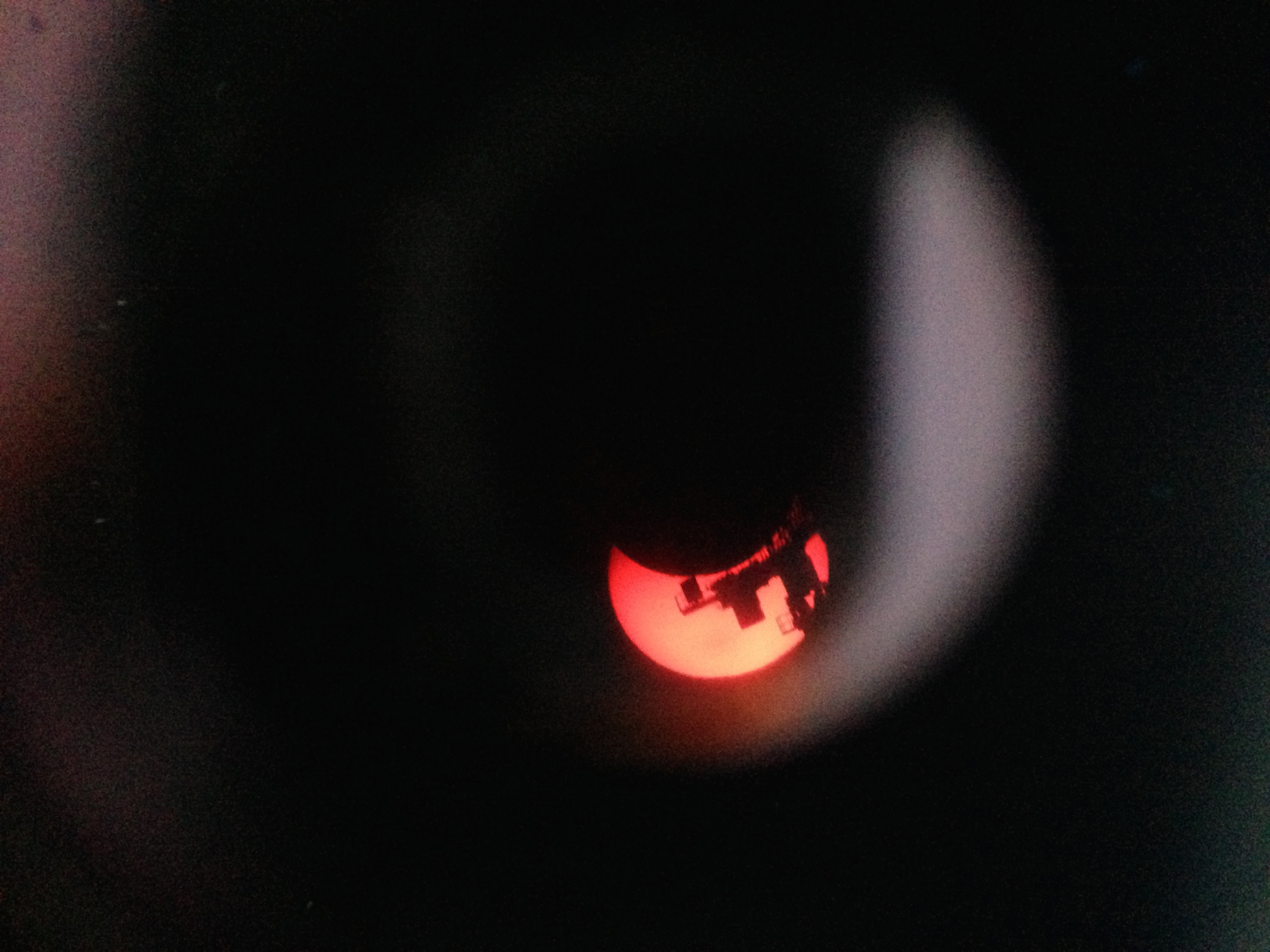
Coralville, Iowa, 22:56 UTC

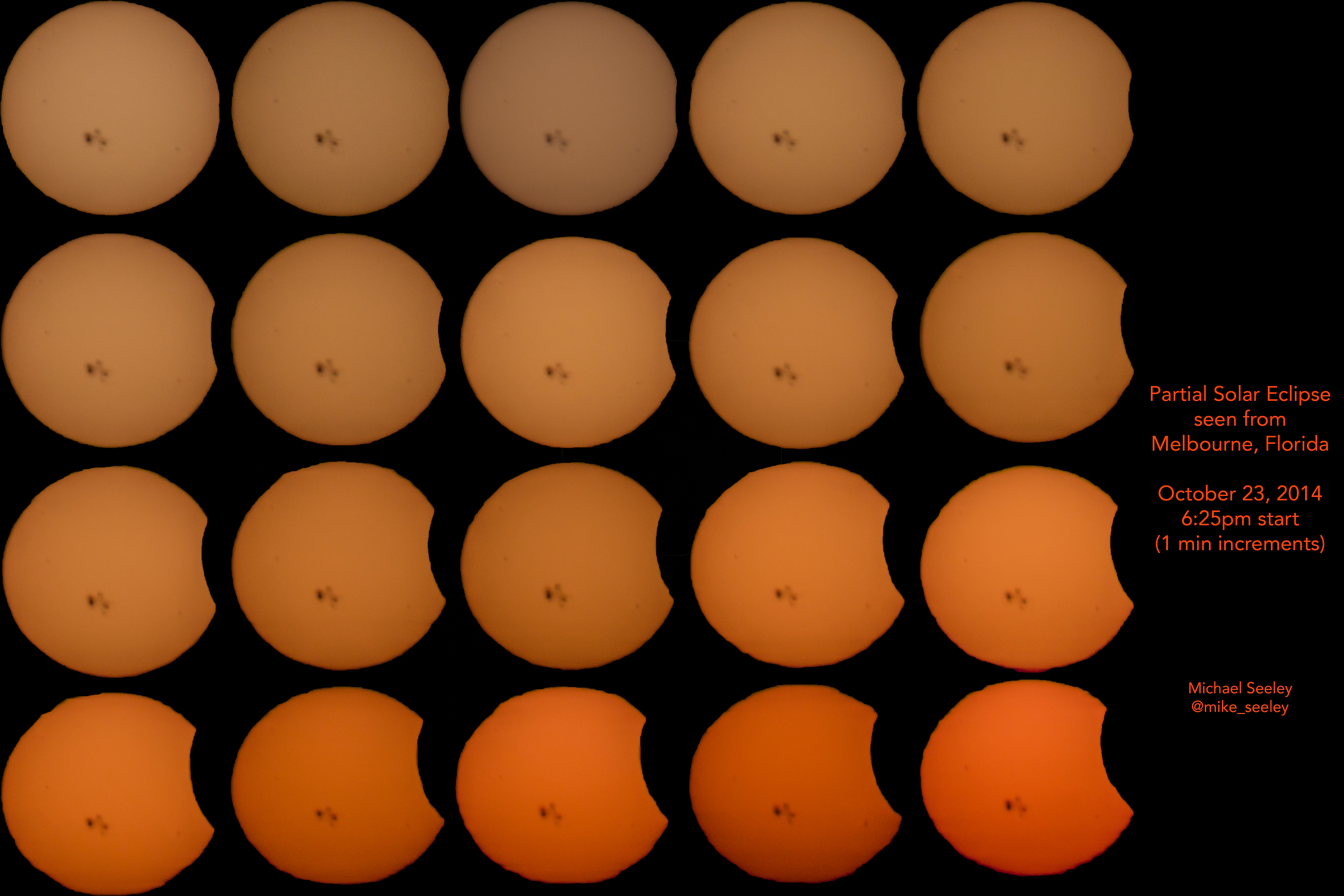
Composite image from Melbourne, Florida

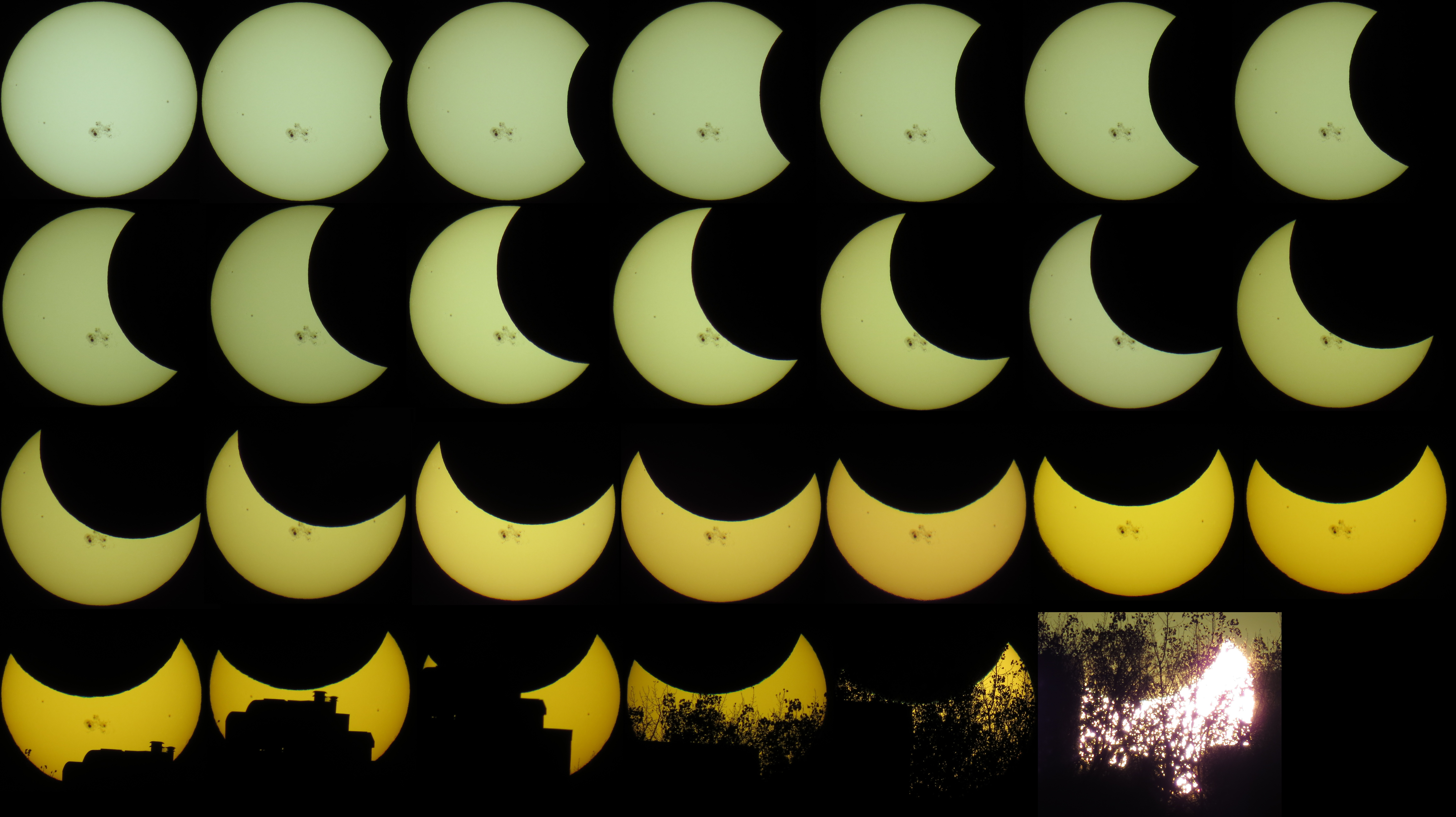
Composite image from Minneapolis, Minnesota

== Eclipse details ==
Shown below are two tables displaying details about this particular solar eclipse. The first table outlines times at which the Moon's penumbra or umbra attains the specific parameter, and the second table describes various other parameters pertaining to this eclipse.

October 23, 2014 Solar Eclipse Times
Event	Time (UTC)
First Penumbral External Contact	2014 October 23 at 19:38:40.5 UTC
Equatorial Conjunction	2014 October 23 at 21:12:30.0 UTC
Greatest Eclipse	2014 October 23 at 21:45:39.2 UTC
Ecliptic Conjunction	2014 October 23 at 21:57:47.2 UTC
Last Penumbral External Contact	2014 October 23 at 23:52:48.0 UTC

October 23, 2014 Solar Eclipse Parameters
Parameter	Value
Eclipse Magnitude	0.81141
Eclipse Obscuration	0.74623
Gamma	1.09078
Sun Right Ascension	13h53m11.9s
Sun Declination	-11°36'45.1"
Sun Semi-Diameter	16'04.6"
Sun Equatorial Horizontal Parallax	08.8"
Moon Right Ascension	13h54m15.8s
Moon Declination	-10°37'52.6"
Moon Semi-Diameter	15'15.5"
Moon Equatorial Horizontal Parallax	0°55'59.9"
ΔT	67.5 s

== Eclipse season ==
This eclipse is part of an eclipse season, a period, roughly every six months, when eclipses occur. Only two (or occasionally three) eclipse seasons occur each year, and each season lasts about 35 days and repeats just short of six months (173 days) later; thus two full eclipse seasons always occur each year. Either two or three eclipses happen each eclipse season. In the sequence below, each eclipse is separated by a fortnight.

Eclipse season of October 2014
October 8 Descending node (full moon)	October 23 Ascending node (new moon)
Total lunar eclipse Lunar Saros 127	Partial solar eclipse Solar Saros 153

== Related eclipses ==
=== Eclipses in 2014 ===
- A total lunar eclipse on April 15.
- A non-central annular solar eclipse on April 29.
- A total lunar eclipse on October 8.
- A partial solar eclipse on October 23.

=== Metonic ===
- Preceded by: Solar eclipse of January 4, 2011
- Followed by: Solar eclipse of August 11, 2018

=== Tzolkinex ===
- Preceded by: Solar eclipse of September 11, 2007
- Followed by: Solar eclipse of December 4, 2021

=== Half-Saros ===
- Preceded by: Lunar eclipse of October 17, 2005
- Followed by: Lunar eclipse of October 28, 2023

=== Tritos ===
- Preceded by: Solar eclipse of November 23, 2003
- Followed by: Solar eclipse of September 21, 2025

=== Solar Saros 153 ===
- Preceded by: Solar eclipse of October 12, 1996
- Followed by: Solar eclipse of November 3, 2032

=== Inex ===
- Preceded by: Solar eclipse of November 12, 1985
- Followed by: Solar eclipse of October 3, 2043

=== Triad ===
- Preceded by: Solar eclipse of December 24, 1927
- Followed by: Solar eclipse of August 24, 2101

=== Solar eclipses of 2011–2014 ===
This eclipse is a member of a semester series. An eclipse in a semester series of solar eclipses repeats approximately every 177 days and 4 hours (a semester) at alternating nodes of the Moon's orbit.

The partial solar eclipses on January 4, 2011 and July 1, 2011 occur in the previous lunar year eclipse set.

Solar eclipse series sets from 2011 to 2014
Descending node			Ascending node		
Saros	Map	Gamma	Saros	Map	Gamma
118 Partial in Tromsø, Norway	June 1, 2011 Partial	1.21300	123 Hinode XRT footage	November 25, 2011 Partial	−1.05359
128 Annularity in Red Bluff, CA, USA	May 20, 2012 Annular	0.48279	133 Totality in Mount Carbine, Queensland, Australia	November 13, 2012 Total	−0.37189
138 Annularity in Churchills Head, Australia	May 10, 2013 Annular	−0.26937	143 Partial in Libreville, Gabon	November 3, 2013 Hybrid	0.32715
148 Partial in Adelaide, Australia	April 29, 2014 Annular (non-central)	−0.99996	153 Partial in Minneapolis, MN, USA	October 23, 2014 Partial	1.09078

=== Saros 153 ===
This eclipse is a part of Saros series 153, repeating every 18 years, 11 days, and containing 70 events. The series started with a partial solar eclipse on July 28, 1870. It contains annular eclipses from December 17, 2104 through May 26, 2970. There are no hybrid or total eclipses in this set. The series ends at member 70 as a partial eclipse on August 22, 3114. Its eclipses are tabulated in three columns; every third eclipse in the same column is one exeligmos apart, so they all cast shadows over approximately the same parts of the Earth.

The longest duration of annularity will be produced by member 38 at 7 minutes, 1 seconds on September 5, 2537. All eclipses in this series occur at the Moon’s ascending node of orbit.

Series members 1–19 occur between 1870 and 2200:
1	2	3
July 28, 1870	August 7, 1888	August 20, 1906
4	5	6
August 30, 1924	September 10, 1942	September 20, 1960
7	8	9
October 2, 1978	October 12, 1996	October 23, 2014
10	11	12
November 3, 2032	November 14, 2050	November 24, 2068
13	14	15
December 6, 2086	December 17, 2104	December 28, 2122
16	17	18
January 8, 2141	January 19, 2159	January 29, 2177
19
February 10, 2195

=== Metonic series ===
The metonic series repeats eclipses every 19 years (6939.69 days), lasting about 5 cycles. Eclipses occur in nearly the same calendar date. In addition, the octon subseries repeats 1/5 of that or every 3.8 years (1387.94 days). All eclipses in this table occur at the Moon's ascending node.

22 eclipse events between January 5, 1935 and August 11, 2018
January 4–5	October 23–24	August 10–12	May 30–31	March 18–19
111	113	115	117	119
January 5, 1935		August 12, 1942	May 30, 1946	March 18, 1950
121	123	125	127	129
January 5, 1954	October 23, 1957	August 11, 1961	May 30, 1965	March 18, 1969
131	133	135	137	139
January 4, 1973	October 23, 1976	August 10, 1980	May 30, 1984	March 18, 1988
141	143	145	147	149
January 4, 1992	October 24, 1995	August 11, 1999	May 31, 2003	March 19, 2007
151	153	155		
January 4, 2011	October 23, 2014	August 11, 2018		

=== Tritos series ===
This eclipse is a part of a tritos cycle, repeating at alternating nodes every 135 synodic months (≈ 3986.63 days, or 11 years minus 1 month). Their appearance and longitude are irregular due to a lack of synchronization with the anomalistic month (period of perigee), but groupings of 3 tritos cycles (≈ 33 years minus 3 months) come close (≈ 434.044 anomalistic months), so eclipses are similar in these groupings.

The partial solar eclipses on November 16, 2134 (part of Saros 164) and October 16, 2145 (part of Saros 165) are also a part of this series but are not included in the table below.

Series members between 1801 and 2069
June 6, 1807 (Saros 134)	May 5, 1818 (Saros 135)	April 3, 1829 (Saros 136)	March 4, 1840 (Saros 137)	February 1, 1851 (Saros 138)
December 31, 1861 (Saros 139)	November 30, 1872 (Saros 140)	October 30, 1883 (Saros 141)	September 29, 1894 (Saros 142)	August 30, 1905 (Saros 143)
July 30, 1916 (Saros 144)	June 29, 1927 (Saros 145)	May 29, 1938 (Saros 146)	April 28, 1949 (Saros 147)	March 27, 1960 (Saros 148)
February 25, 1971 (Saros 149)	January 25, 1982 (Saros 150)	December 24, 1992 (Saros 151)	November 23, 2003 (Saros 152)	October 23, 2014 (Saros 153)
September 21, 2025 (Saros 154)	August 21, 2036 (Saros 155)	July 22, 2047 (Saros 156)	June 21, 2058 (Saros 157)	May 20, 2069 (Saros 158)

=== Inex series ===
This eclipse is a part of the long period inex cycle, repeating at alternating nodes, every 358 synodic months (≈ 10,571.95 days, or 29 years minus 20 days). Their appearance and longitude are irregular due to a lack of synchronization with the anomalistic month (period of perigee). However, groupings of 3 inex cycles (≈ 87 years minus 2 months) comes close (≈ 1,151.02 anomalistic months), so eclipses are similar in these groupings.

Series members between 1801 and 2200
March 13, 1812 (Saros 146)	February 21, 1841 (Saros 147)	January 31, 1870 (Saros 148)
January 11, 1899 (Saros 149)	December 24, 1927 (Saros 150)	December 2, 1956 (Saros 151)
November 12, 1985 (Saros 152)	October 23, 2014 (Saros 153)	October 3, 2043 (Saros 154)
September 12, 2072 (Saros 155)	August 24, 2101 (Saros 156)	August 4, 2130 (Saros 157)
July 15, 2159 (Saros 158)	June 24, 2188 (Saros 159)	
