= October 2014 lunar eclipse =

Total lunar eclipse of 8 October 2014

- Total eclipse
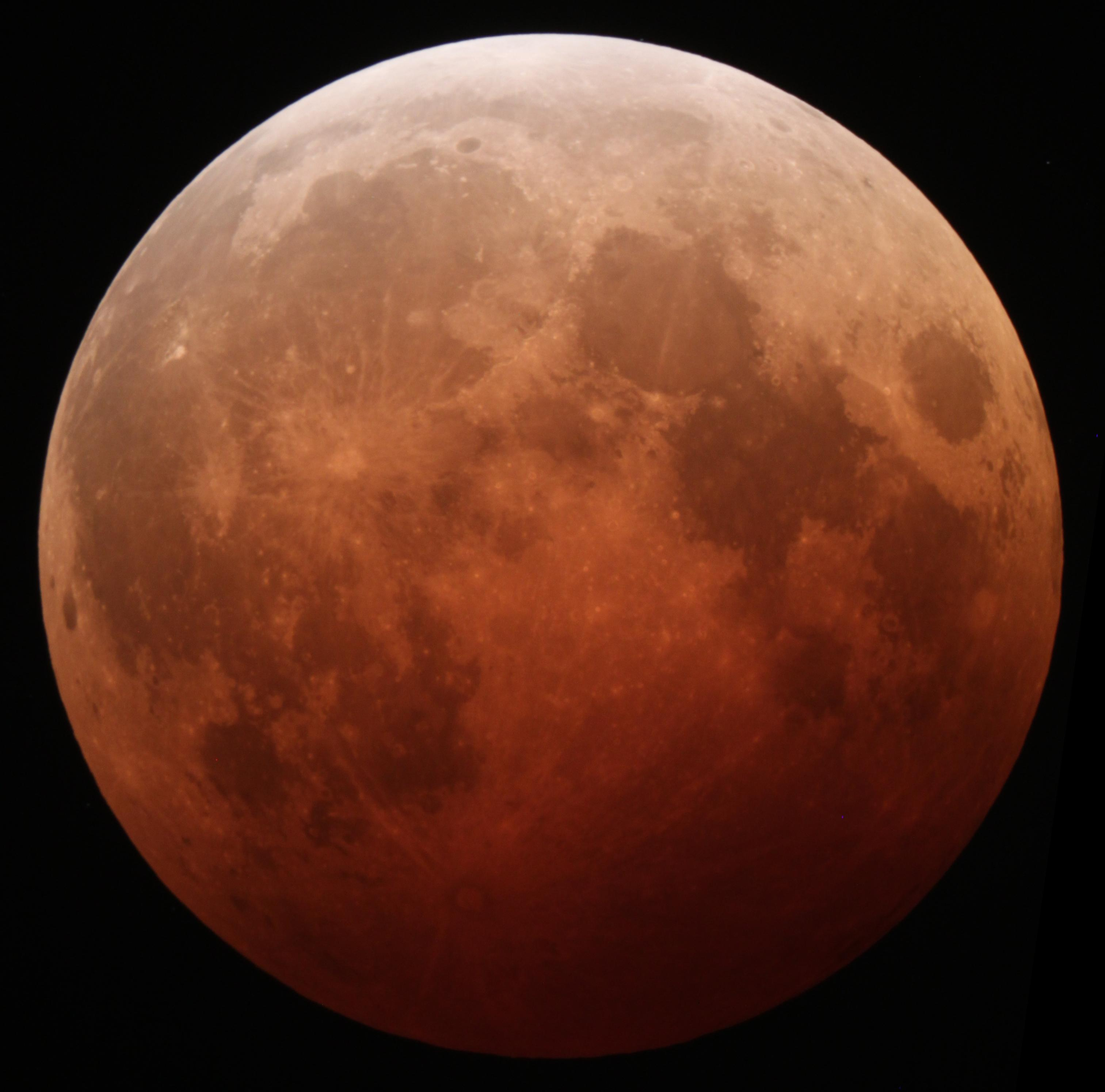
- Totality as viewed from Lomita, California, 10:55 UTC
- Date: 8 October 2014
- Gamma: 0.3826
- Magnitude: 1.1670
- Saros cycle: 127 (42 of 72)
- Totality: 58 minutes, 50 seconds
- Partiality: 199 minutes, 31 seconds
- Penumbral: 318 minutes, 3 seconds
Contacts (UTC)
- P1: 8:15:36
- U1: 9:14:48
- U2: 10:25:09
- Greatest: 10:54:35
- U3: 11:23:59
- U4: 12:34:19
- P4: 13:33:39

A total lunar eclipse occurred at the Moon's descending node of orbit on Wednesday, 8 October 2014, with an umbral magnitude of 1.1670. A lunar eclipse occurs when the Moon moves into the Earth's shadow, causing the Moon to be darkened. A total lunar eclipse occurs when the Moon's near side entirely passes into the Earth's umbral shadow. Unlike a solar eclipse, which can only be viewed from a relatively small area of the world, a lunar eclipse may be viewed from anywhere on the night side of Earth. A total lunar eclipse can last up to nearly two hours, while a total solar eclipse lasts only a few minutes at any given place, because the Moon's shadow is smaller. Occurring about 2.2 days after perigee (on 6 October 2014, at 5:40 UTC), the Moon's apparent diameter was larger.

This lunar eclipse is the second of a tetrad, with four total lunar eclipses in series, the others being on April 15, 2014; April 4, 2015; and September 28, 2015.

== Background ==
A lunar eclipse occurs when the Moon passes within Earth's umbra (shadow). As the eclipse begins, the Earth's shadow first darkens the Moon slightly. Then, the shadow begins to "cover" part of the Moon, turning it a dark red-brown color (typically - the color can vary based on atmospheric conditions). The Moon appears to be reddish because of Rayleigh scattering (the same effect that causes sunsets to appear reddish) and the refraction of that light by the Earth's atmosphere into its umbra. The following simulation shows the approximate appearance of the Moon passing through the Earth's shadow. The Moon's brightness is exaggerated within the umbral shadow. The southern portion of the Moon was closest to the center of the shadow, making it darkest, and most red in appearance.

The planet Uranus was near opposition (opposition on 7 October) during the eclipse, just over 1° from the eclipsed Moon. Shining at magnitude 5.7, Uranus should have been bright enough to identify in binoculars. Due to parallax, the position of Uranus relative to the Moon varied significantly depending on the viewing position on the surface of Earth.

== Visibility and appearance ==
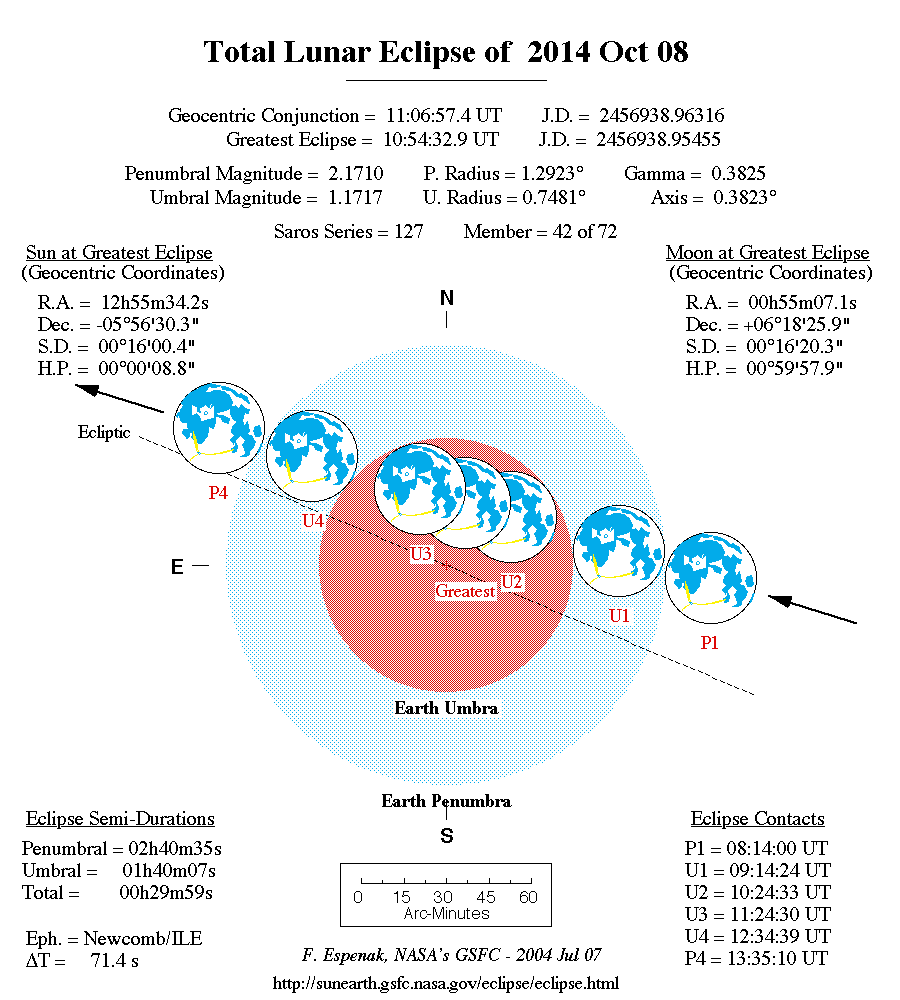
NASA chart of the eclipse

The eclipse was completely visible over northeast Asia, eastern Australia, the Pacific Ocean, and western North America, seen rising over Asia and much of Australia and setting over North and South America.

The eclipse was visible in its entirety over the Northern Pacific. Viewers in North America experienced the eclipse after midnight on Wednesday, 8 October, and the eclipse was visible from the Philippines, western Pacific, Australia, Indonesia, Japan, and eastern Asia after sunset on the evening of 8 October. Many areas of North America experienced a selenelion, able to see both the sun and the eclipsed moon at the same time.

The MESSENGER spacecraft from orbit at the planet Mercury which was 107 million kilometers away from Earth at the time also observed the eclipse, making it the first lunar eclipse in history to be observed from another planet.

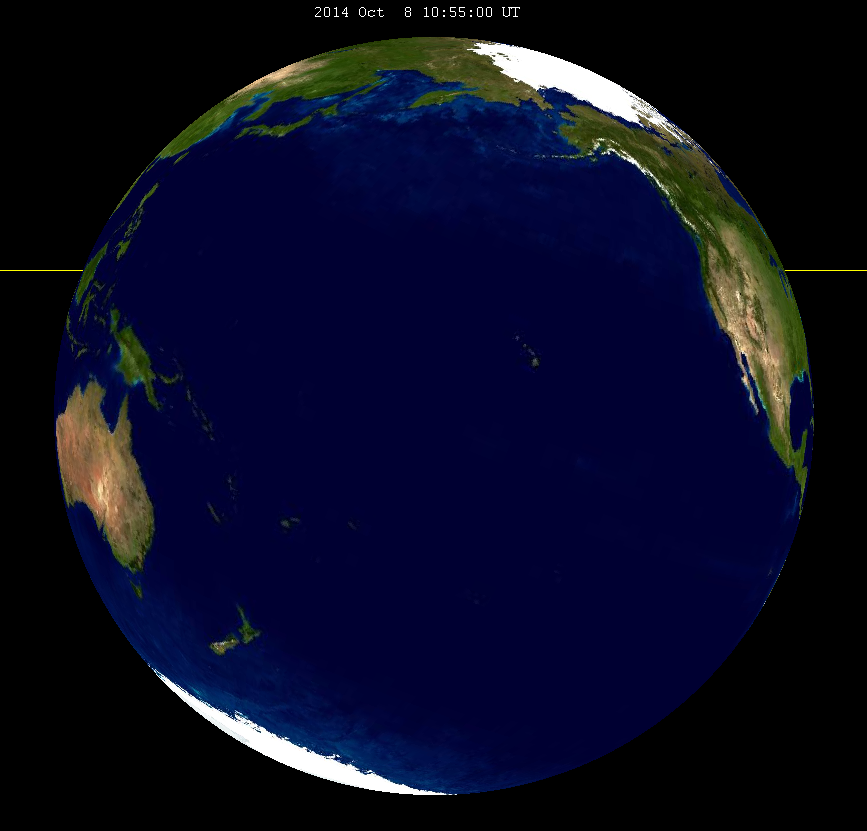
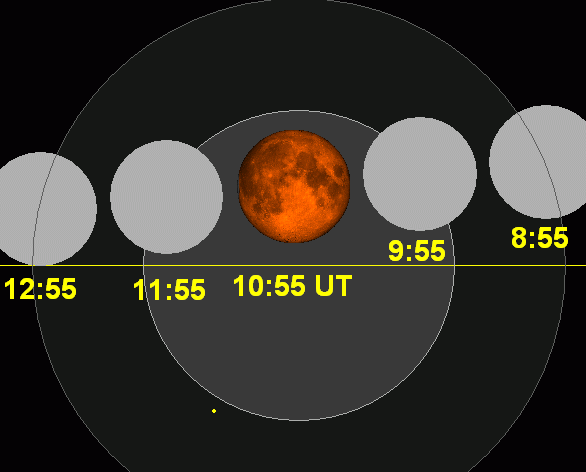
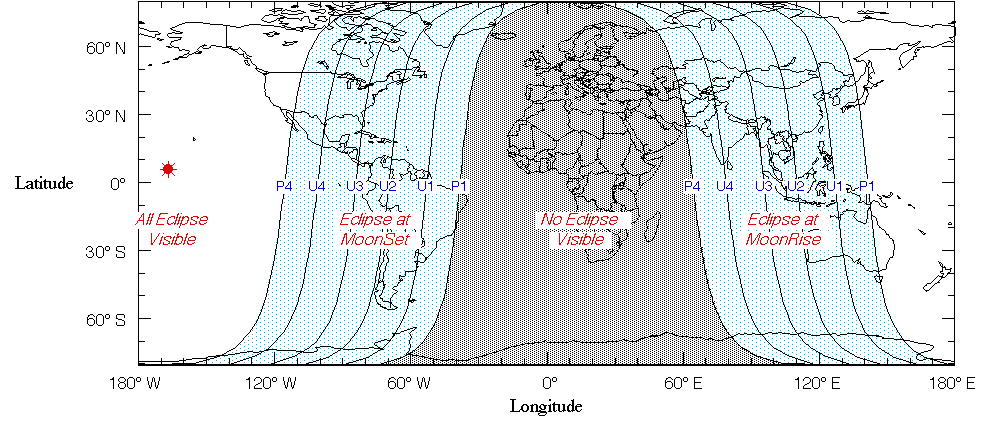
Visibility map

== Timing ==
Local times of contacts
Time zone adjustments from UTC		+8_{h}	+11_{h}	+13_{h}	-9_{h}	-8_{h}	-7_{h}	-6_{h}	-5_{h}	-4_{h}	-3_{h}
Time zone adjustments from UTC		AWST	AEDT	NZDT	HADT	AKDT	PDT	MDT	CDT PET	EDT BOT	ADT AMST ART
Event		Evening 8 October			Evening 7 October		Morning 8 October				
P1	Penumbral begins	N/A†	7:16 pm	9:16 pm	11:16 pm	12:16 am	1:16 am	2:16 am	3:16 am	4:16 am	5:16 am
U1	Partial begins	N/A†	8:15 pm	10:15 pm	12:15 am	1:15 am	2:15 am	3:15 am	4:15 am	5:15 am	6:15 am
U2	Total begins	6:25 pm	9:25 pm	11:25 pm	1:25 am	2:25 am	3:25 am	4:25 am	5:25 am	6:25 am	7:25 am
	Greatest eclipse	6:55 pm	9:55 pm	11:55 pm	1:55 am	2:55 am	3:55 am	4:55 am	5:55 am	6:55 am	Set
U3	Total ends	7:24 pm	10:24 pm	12:24 am	2:24 am	3:24 am	4:24 am	5:24 am	6:24 am	Set	Set
U4	Partial ends	8:34 pm	11:34 pm	1:34 am	3:34 am	4:34 am	5:34 am	6:34 am	Set	Set	Set
P4	Penumbral ends	9:34 pm	12:34 am	2:34 am	4:34 am	5:34 am	6:34 am	Set	Set	Set	Set

† The Moon was not visible during this part of the eclipse in this time zone.

Contact points relative to the Earth's umbral and penumbral shadows, here with the Moon near is descending node

The timing of total lunar eclipses are determined by its contacts:
- P1 (First contact): Beginning of the penumbral eclipse. Earth's penumbra touches the Moon's outer limb.
- U1 (Second contact): Beginning of the partial eclipse. Earth's umbra touches the Moon's outer limb.
- U2 (Third contact): Beginning of the total eclipse. The Moon's surface is entirely within Earth's umbra.
- Greatest eclipse: The peak stage of the total eclipse. The Moon is at its closest to the center of Earth's umbra.
- U3 (Fourth contact): End of the total eclipse. The Moon's outer limb exits Earth's umbra.
- U4 (Fifth contact): End of the partial eclipse. Earth's umbra leaves the Moon's surface.
- P4 (Sixth contact): End of the penumbral eclipse. Earth's penumbra no longer makes contact with the Moon.

== Gallery ==
Composite from Aichi prefecture, Japan	Composite from Coralville, IA, first contact to the greatest.	Selenelion from Minneapolis, MN, with a partially eclipsed moon still up after sunrise, 12:26 UTC, seen by sunlight on foreground trees, right.

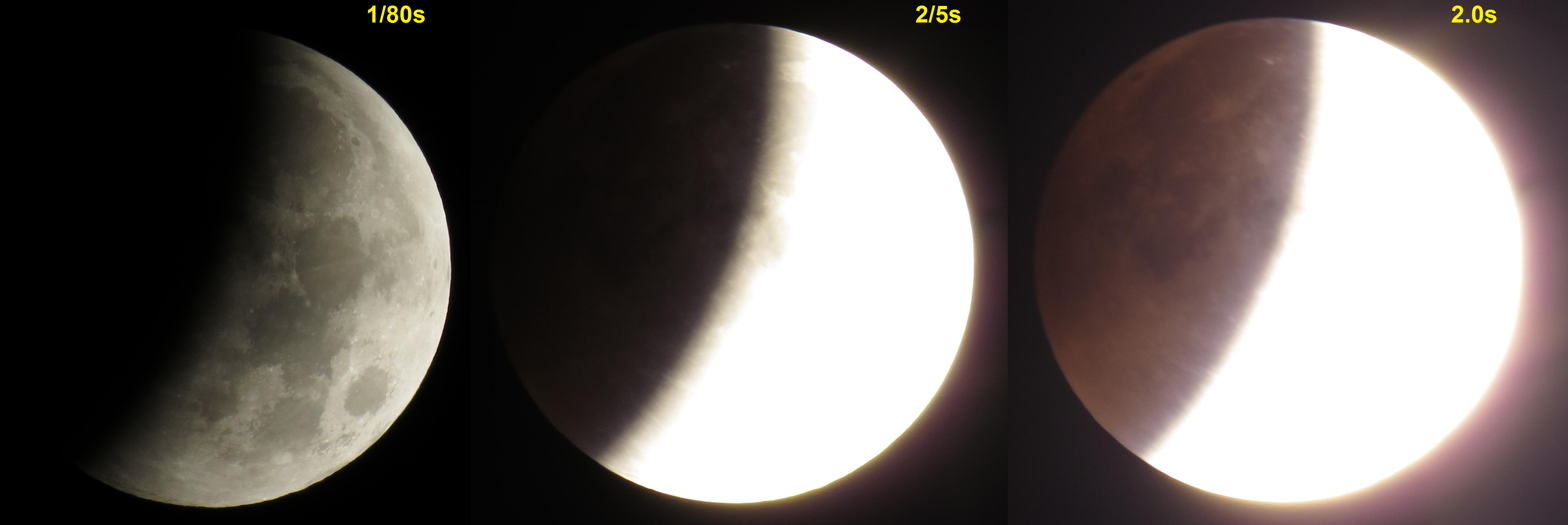
Minneapolis, MN, 9:46 UTC, triple exposure

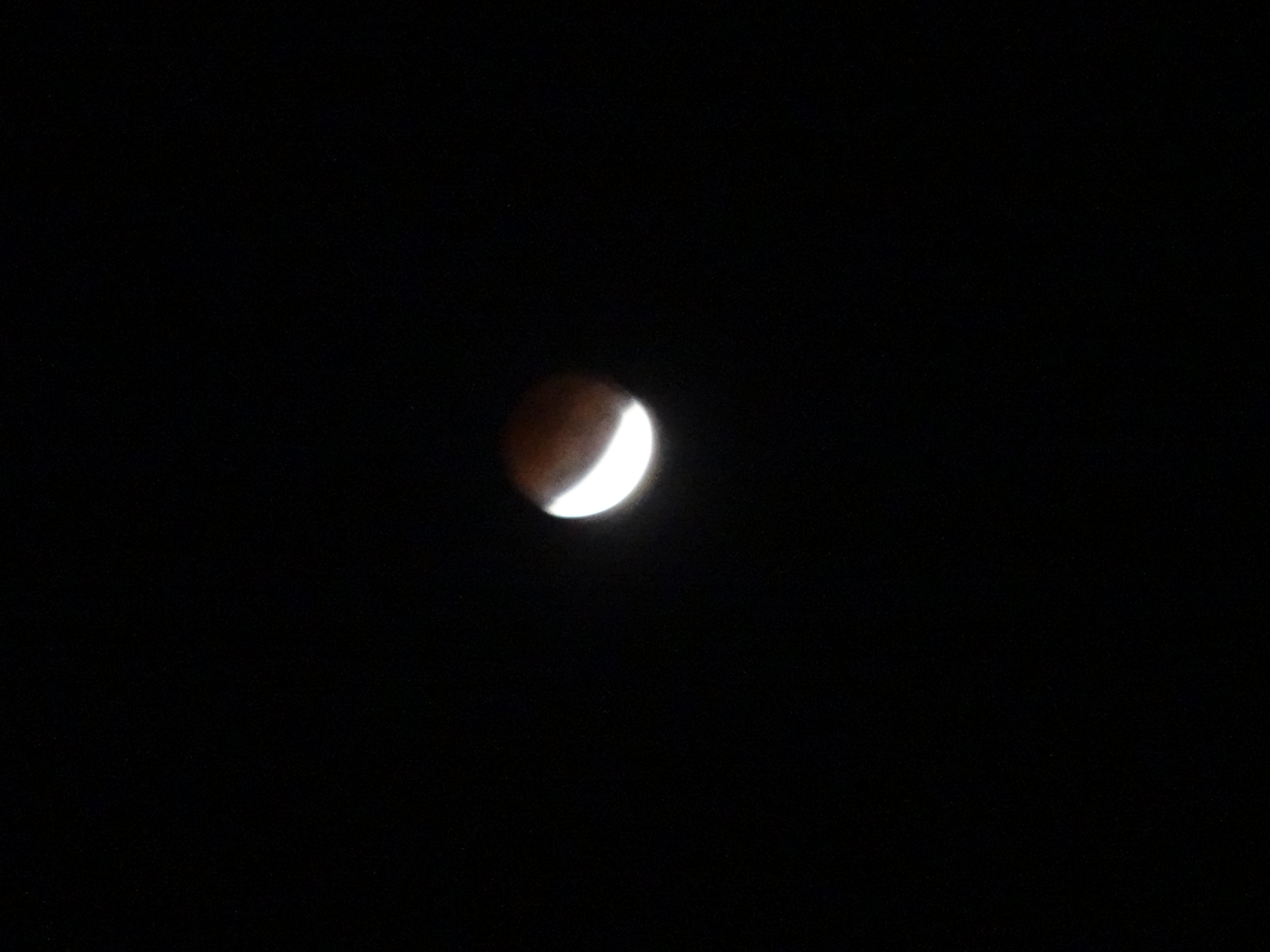
Before the beginning of total eclipse, Valdosta, GA, 10:02 UTC

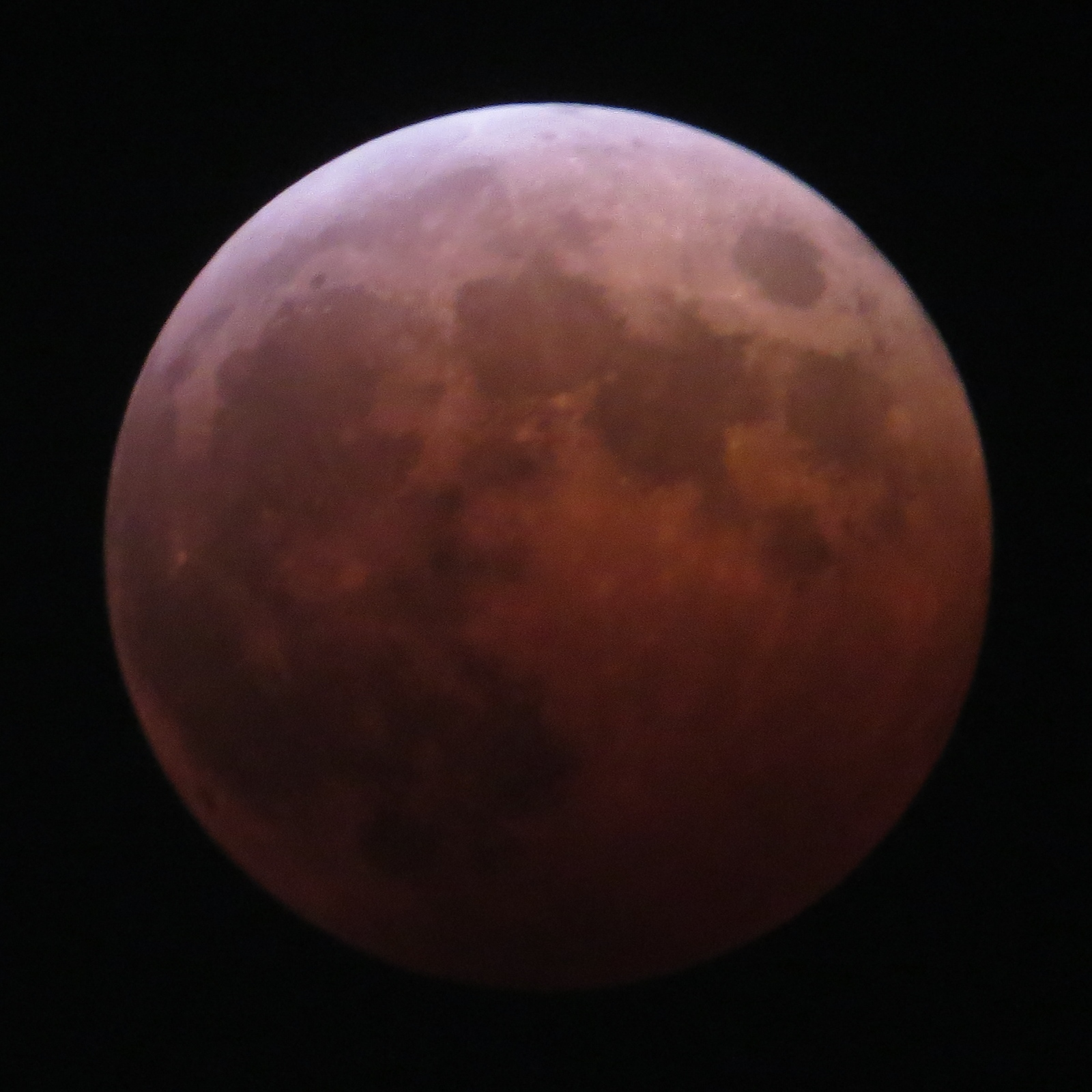
Aichi Prefecture, Japan, 10:26 UTC

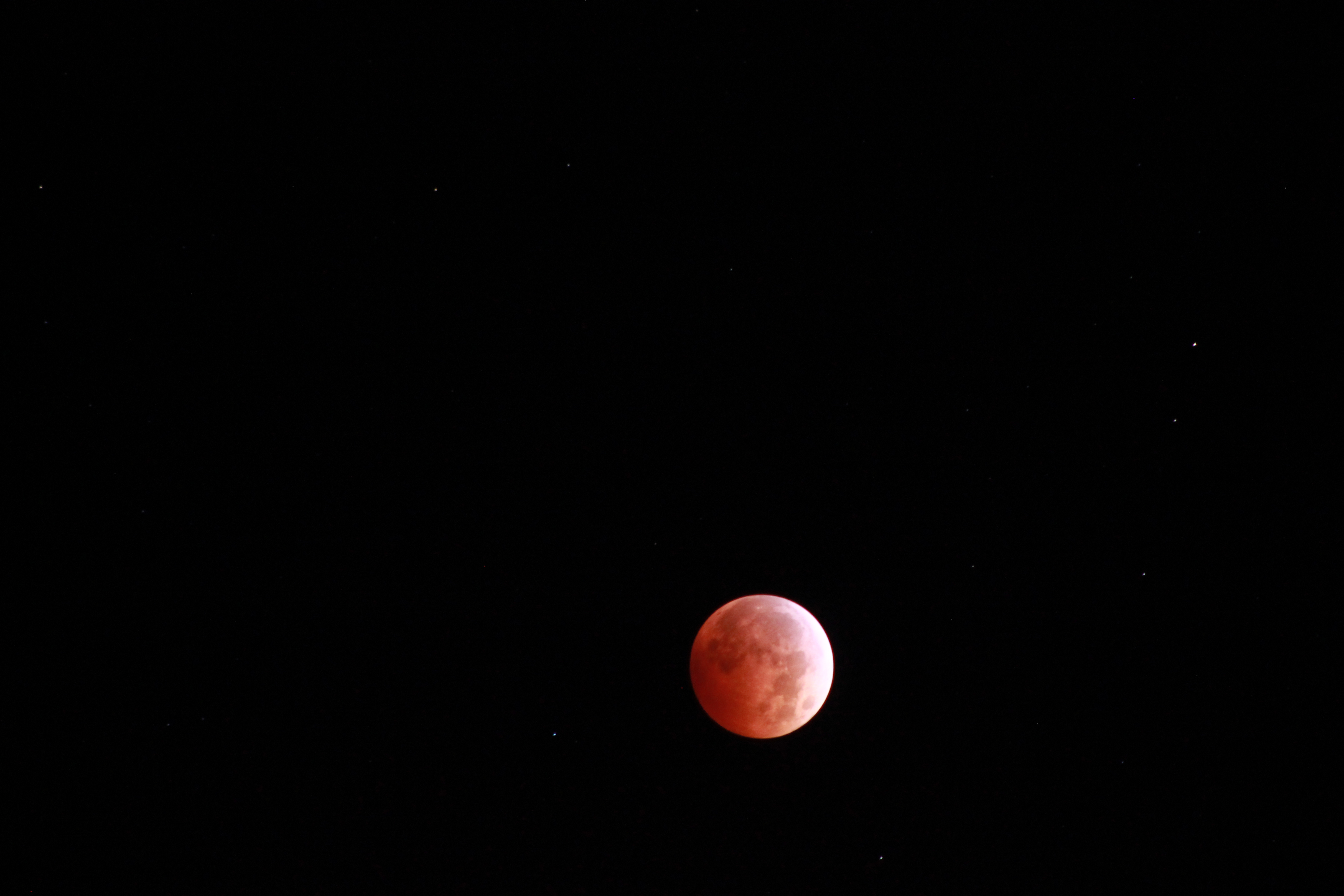
California, 10:39 UTC

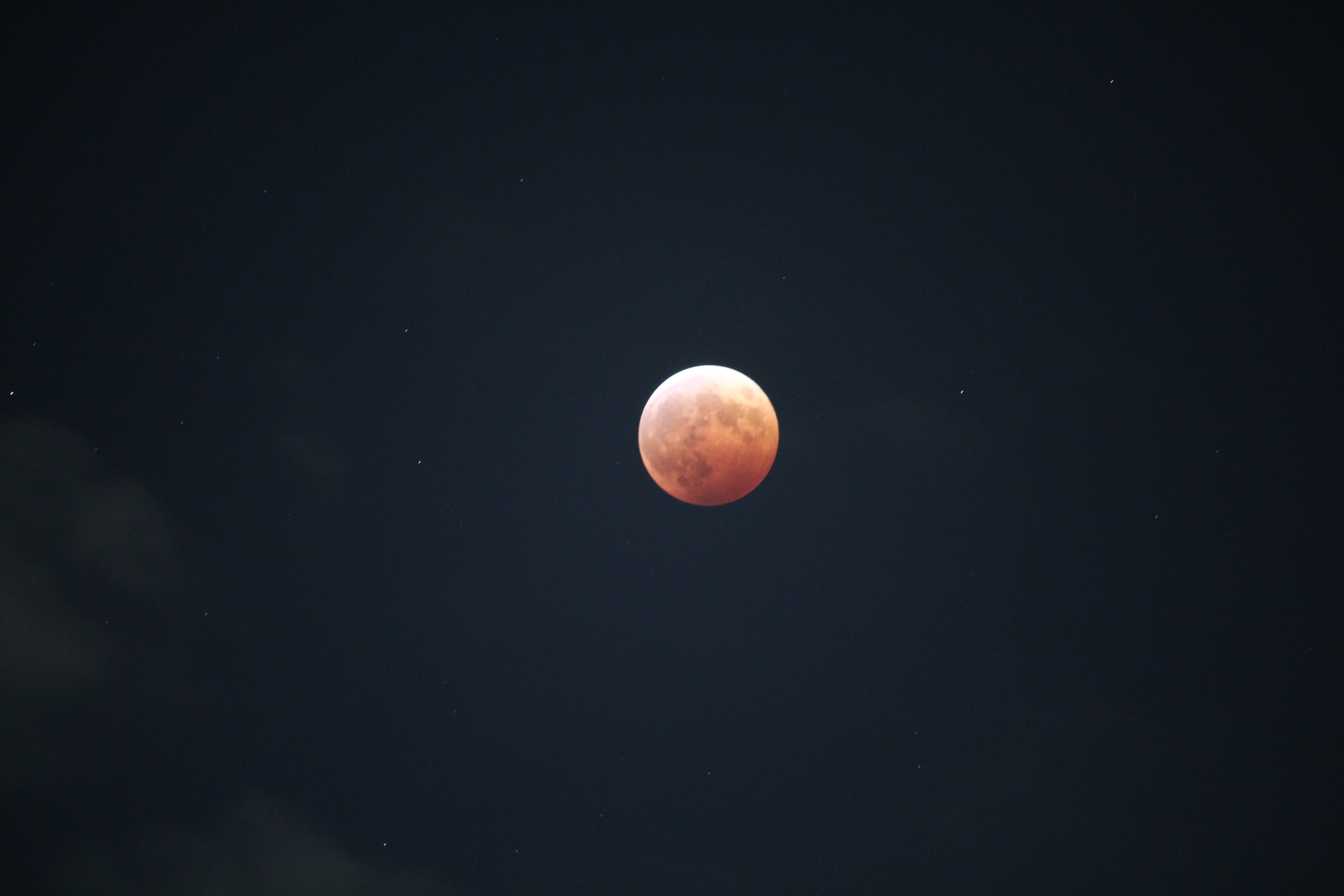
Aichi Prefecture, Japan, 10:41 UTC

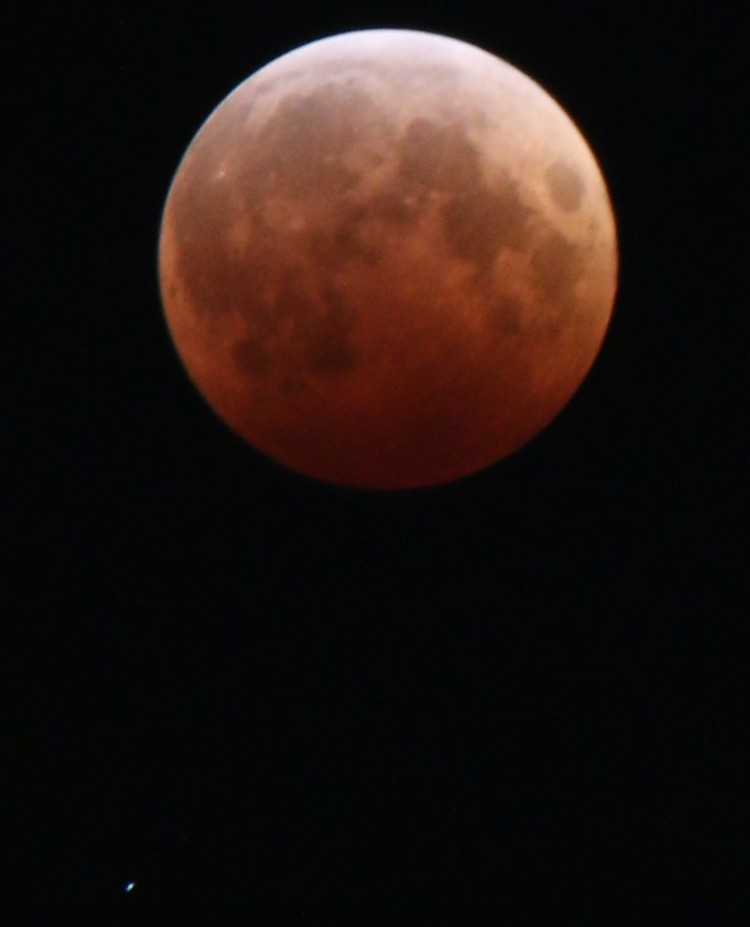
The eclipse with Uranus in Minneapolis, 10:46 UTC

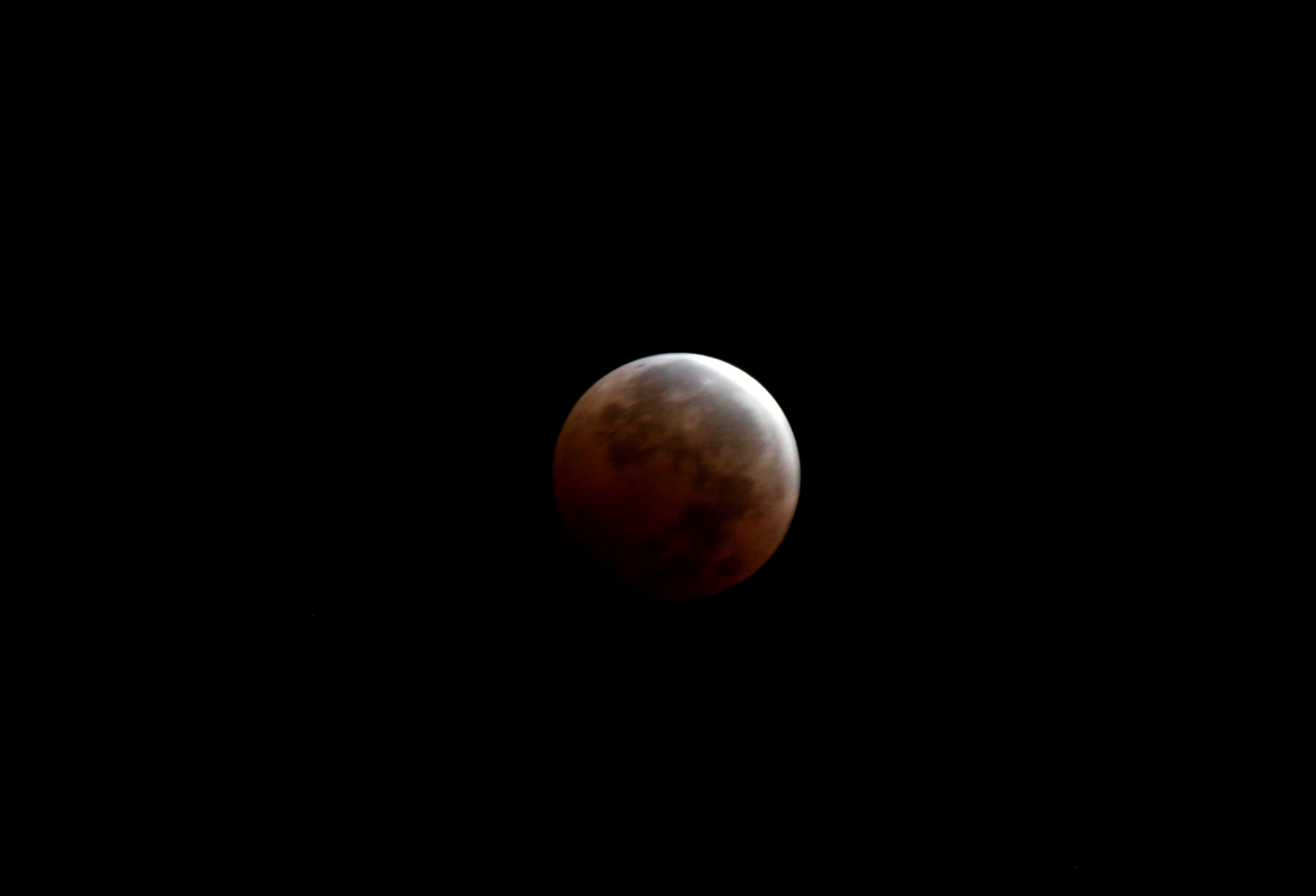
After the end of total eclipse, Santa Clara County, CA, 11:28 UTC

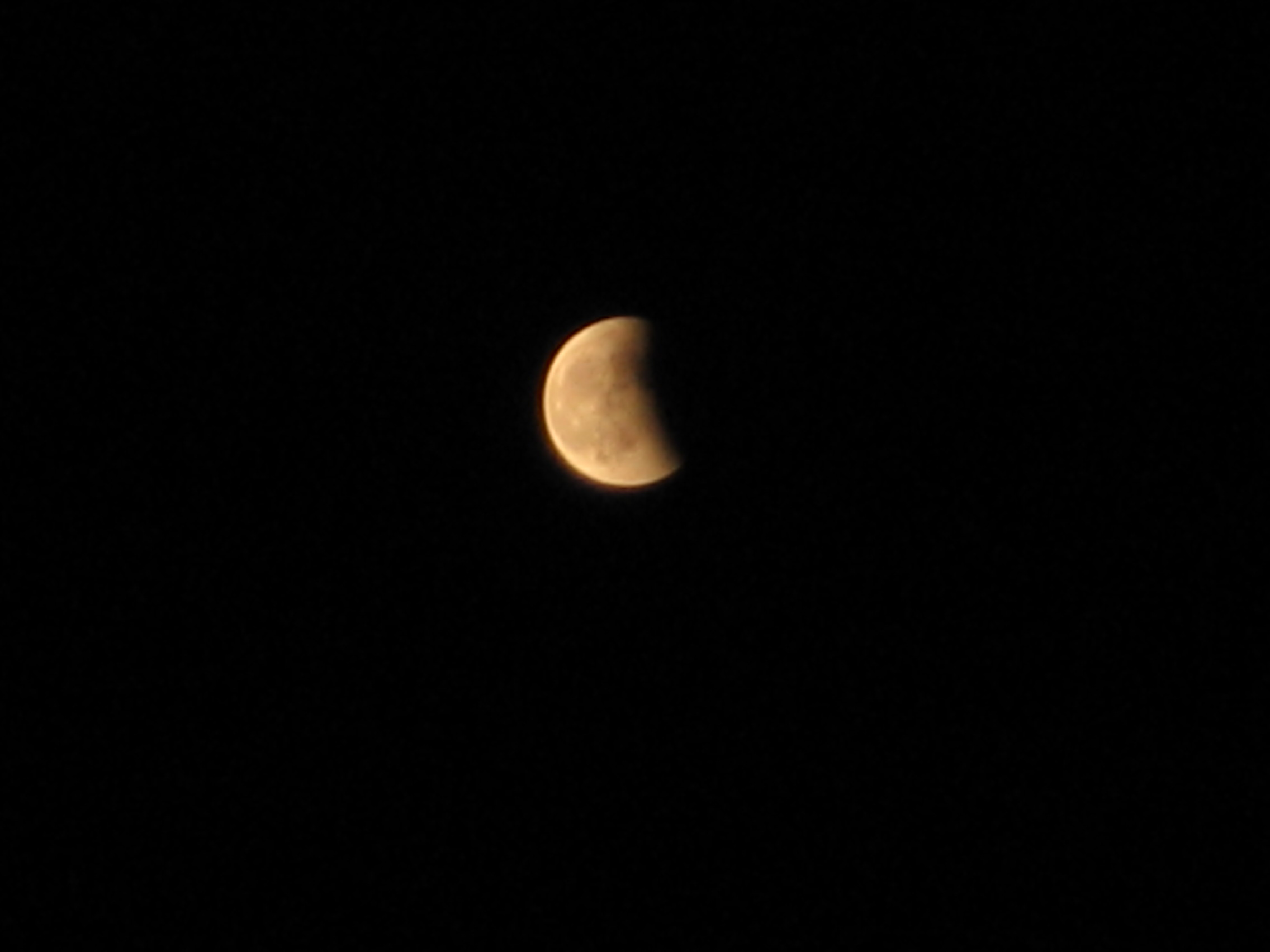
Partial phase of the eclipse, Hefei, China, 12:18 UTC

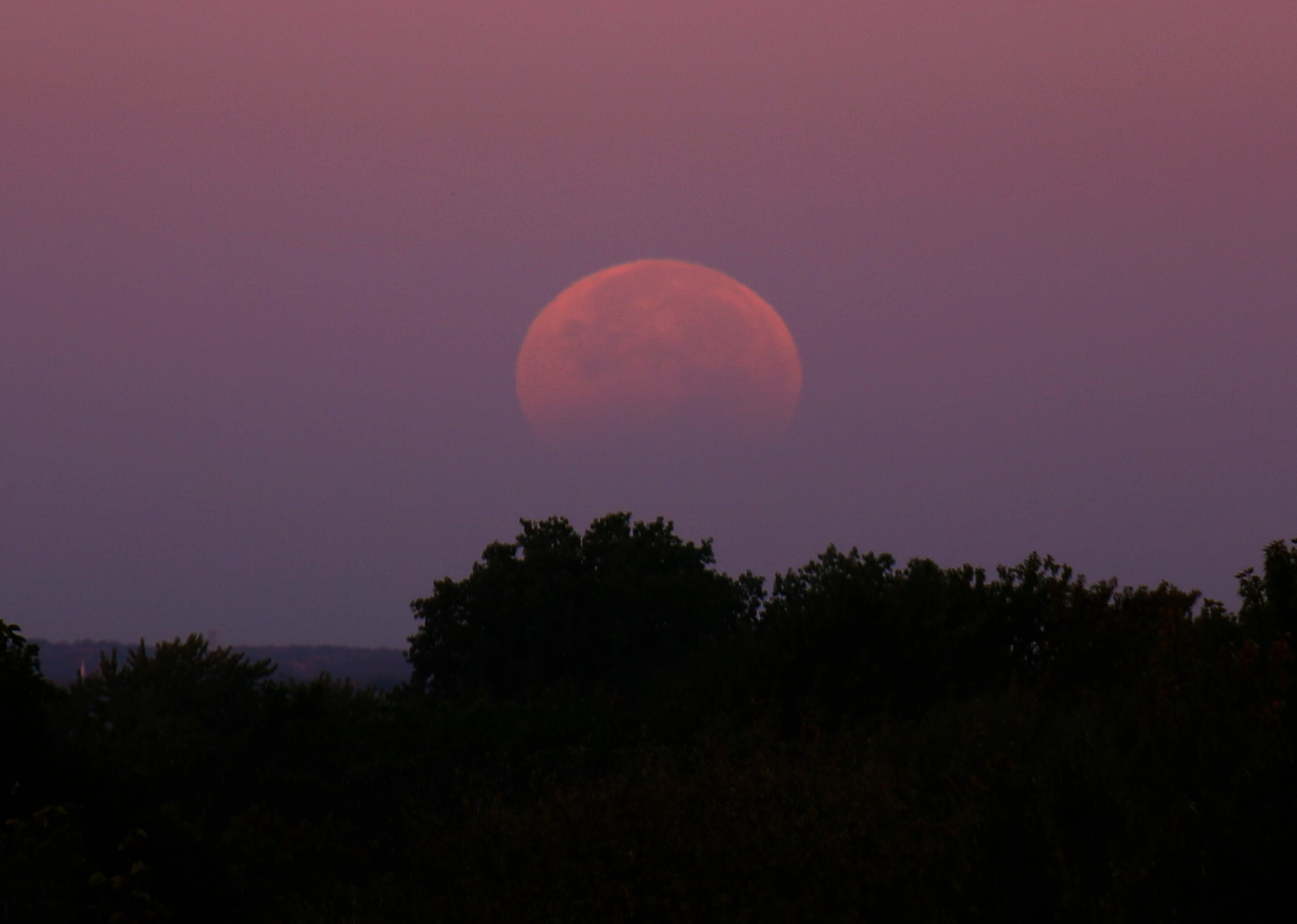
Minneapolis, MN, 12:24 UTC

Lunar eclipse as viewed from Mercury, captured from the MESSENGER spacecraft. The Moon can be seen falling into the shadow of Earth. This movie was constructed from 31 images taken two minutes apart, from 9:18 UTC to 10:18 UTC.

== Eclipse details ==
Shown below is a table displaying details about this particular lunar eclipse. It describes various parameters pertaining to this eclipse.

8 October 2014 Lunar Eclipse Parameters
Parameter	Value
Penumbral Magnitude	2.14667
Umbral Magnitude	1.16698
Gamma	0.38267
Sun Right Ascension	12h55m34.3s
Sun Declination	-05°56'30.7"
Sun Semi-Diameter	16'00.4"
Sun Equatorial Horizontal Parallax	08.8"
Moon Right Ascension	00h55m07.2s
Moon Declination	+06°18'26.7"
Moon Semi-Diameter	16'20.3"
Moon Equatorial Horizontal Parallax	0°59'57.9"
ΔT	67.5 s

== Eclipse season ==
This eclipse is part of an eclipse season, a period, roughly every six months, when eclipses occur. Only two (or occasionally three) eclipse seasons occur each year, and each season lasts about 35 days and repeats just short of six months (173 days) later; thus two full eclipse seasons always occur each year. Either two or three eclipses happen each eclipse season. In the sequence below, each eclipse is separated by a fortnight.

Eclipse season of October 2014
October 8 Descending node (full moon)	October 23 Ascending node (new moon)
Total lunar eclipse Lunar Saros 127	Partial solar eclipse Solar Saros 153

== Related eclipses ==
=== Eclipses in 2014 ===
- A total lunar eclipse on April 15.
- A non-central annular solar eclipse on April 29.
- A total lunar eclipse on 8 October.
- A partial solar eclipse on October 23.

=== Metonic ===
- Preceded by: Lunar eclipse of December 21, 2010
- Followed by: Lunar eclipse of July 27, 2018

=== Tzolkinex ===
- Preceded by: Lunar eclipse of August 28, 2007
- Followed by: Lunar eclipse of November 19, 2021

=== Half-Saros ===
- Preceded by: Solar eclipse of October 3, 2005
- Followed by: Solar eclipse of October 14, 2023

=== Tritos ===
- Preceded by: Lunar eclipse of November 9, 2003
- Followed by: Lunar eclipse of September 7, 2025

=== Lunar Saros 127 ===
- Preceded by: Lunar eclipse of September 27, 1996
- Followed by: Lunar eclipse of October 18, 2032

=== Inex ===
- Preceded by: Lunar eclipse of October 28, 1985
- Followed by: Lunar eclipse of September 19, 2043

=== Triad ===
- Preceded by: Lunar eclipse of December 8, 1927
- Followed by: Lunar eclipse of August 9, 2101

=== Lunar eclipses of 2013–2016 ===
This eclipse is a member of a semester series. An eclipse in a semester series of lunar eclipses repeats approximately every 177 days and 4 hours (a semester) at alternating nodes of the Moon's orbit.

The penumbral lunar eclipse on May 25, 2013 occurs in the previous lunar year eclipse set, and the penumbral lunar eclipse on August 18, 2016 occurs in the next lunar year eclipse set.

Lunar eclipse series sets from 2013 to 2016
Ascending node				Descending node			
Saros	Date Viewing	Type Chart	Gamma	Saros	Date Viewing	Type Chart	Gamma
112	2013 Apr 25	Partial	−1.0121	117	2013 Oct 18	Penumbral	1.1508
122	2014 Apr 15	Total	−0.3017	127	2014 Oct 08	Total	0.3827
132	2015 Apr 04	Total	0.4460	137	2015 Sep 28	Total	−0.3296
142	2016 Mar 23	Penumbral	1.1592	147	2016 Sep 16	Penumbral	−1.0549

=== Saros 127 ===
This eclipse is a part of Saros series 127, repeating every 18 years, 11 days, and containing 72 events. The series started with a penumbral lunar eclipse on July 9, 1275. It contains partial eclipses from November 4, 1473 through May 18, 1780; total eclipses from May 29, 1798 through November 9, 2068; and a second set of partial eclipses from November 20, 2086 through June 17, 2429. The series ends at member 72 as a penumbral eclipse on September 2, 2555.

The longest duration of totality was produced by member 35 at 101 minutes, 46 seconds on July 23, 1888. All eclipses in this series occur at the Moon’s descending node of orbit.

Greatest	First			
The greatest eclipse of the series occurred on 1888 Jul 23, lasting 101 minutes, 46 seconds.	Penumbral	Partial	Total	Central
The greatest eclipse of the series occurred on 1888 Jul 23, lasting 101 minutes, 46 seconds.	1275 Jul 09	1473 Nov 04	1798 May 29	1834 Jun 21
The greatest eclipse of the series occurred on 1888 Jul 23, lasting 101 minutes, 46 seconds.	Last			
The greatest eclipse of the series occurred on 1888 Jul 23, lasting 101 minutes, 46 seconds.	Central	Total	Partial	Penumbral
The greatest eclipse of the series occurred on 1888 Jul 23, lasting 101 minutes, 46 seconds.	1960 Sep 05	2068 Nov 09	2429 Jun 17	2555 Sep 02

Eclipses are tabulated in three columns; every third eclipse in the same column is one exeligmos apart, so they all cast shadows over approximately the same parts of the Earth.

Series members 31–52 occur between 1801 and 2200:
31	32	33
1816 Jun 10	1834 Jun 21	1852 Jul 01
34	35	36
1870 Jul 12	1888 Jul 23	1906 Aug 04
37	38	39
1924 Aug 14	1942 Aug 26	1960 Sep 05
40	41	42
1978 Sep 16	1996 Sep 27	2014 Oct 08
43	44	45
2032 Oct 18	2050 Oct 30	2068 Nov 09
46	47	48
2086 Nov 20	2104 Dec 02	2122 Dec 13
49	50	51
2140 Dec 23	2159 Jan 04	2177 Jan 14
52
2195 Jan 26

=== Tritos series ===
This eclipse is a part of a tritos cycle, repeating at alternating nodes every 135 synodic months (≈ 3986.63 days, or 11 years minus 1 month). Their appearance and longitude are irregular due to a lack of synchronization with the anomalistic month (period of perigee), but groupings of 3 tritos cycles (≈ 33 years minus 3 months) come close (≈ 434.044 anomalistic months), so eclipses are similar in these groupings.

Series members between 1801 and 2200
1807 May 21 (Saros 108)	1818 Apr 21 (Saros 109)	1829 Mar 20 (Saros 110)	1840 Feb 17 (Saros 111)	1851 Jan 17 (Saros 112)
1861 Dec 17 (Saros 113)	1872 Nov 15 (Saros 114)	1883 Oct 16 (Saros 115)	1894 Sep 15 (Saros 116)	1905 Aug 15 (Saros 117)
1916 Jul 15 (Saros 118)	1927 Jun 15 (Saros 119)	1938 May 14 (Saros 120)	1949 Apr 13 (Saros 121)	1960 Mar 13 (Saros 122)
1971 Feb 10 (Saros 123)	1982 Jan 09 (Saros 124)	1992 Dec 09 (Saros 125)	2003 Nov 09 (Saros 126)	2014 Oct 08 (Saros 127)
2025 Sep 07 (Saros 128)	2036 Aug 07 (Saros 129)	2047 Jul 07 (Saros 130)	2058 Jun 06 (Saros 131)	2069 May 06 (Saros 132)
2080 Apr 04 (Saros 133)	2091 Mar 05 (Saros 134)	2102 Feb 03 (Saros 135)	2113 Jan 02 (Saros 136)	2123 Dec 03 (Saros 137)
2134 Nov 02 (Saros 138)	2145 Sep 30 (Saros 139)	2156 Aug 30 (Saros 140)	2167 Aug 01 (Saros 141)	2178 Jun 30 (Saros 142)
2189 May 29 (Saros 143)	2200 Apr 30 (Saros 144)			

=== Inex series ===
This eclipse is a part of the long period inex cycle, repeating at alternating nodes, every 358 synodic months (≈ 10,571.95 days, or 29 years minus 20 days). Their appearance and longitude are irregular due to a lack of synchronization with the anomalistic month (period of perigee). However, groupings of 3 inex cycles (≈ 87 years minus 2 months) comes close (≈ 1,151.02 anomalistic months), so eclipses are similar in these groupings.

Series members between 1801 and 2200
1812 Feb 27 (Saros 120)	1841 Feb 06 (Saros 121)	1870 Jan 17 (Saros 122)
1898 Dec 27 (Saros 123)	1927 Dec 08 (Saros 124)	1956 Nov 18 (Saros 125)
1985 Oct 28 (Saros 126)	2014 Oct 08 (Saros 127)	2043 Sep 19 (Saros 128)
2072 Aug 28 (Saros 129)	2101 Aug 09 (Saros 130)	2130 Jul 21 (Saros 131)
2159 Jun 30 (Saros 132)	2188 Jun 09 (Saros 133)	

=== Half-Saros cycle ===
A lunar eclipse will be preceded and followed by solar eclipses by 9 years and 5.5 days (a half saros). This lunar eclipse is related to two annular solar eclipses of solar saros 134.

October 3, 2005	October 14, 2023

== See also ==
- April 2014 lunar eclipse
- List of lunar eclipses and List of 21st-century lunar eclipses
