= Mursili's eclipse =

Solar eclipse recorded in antiquity

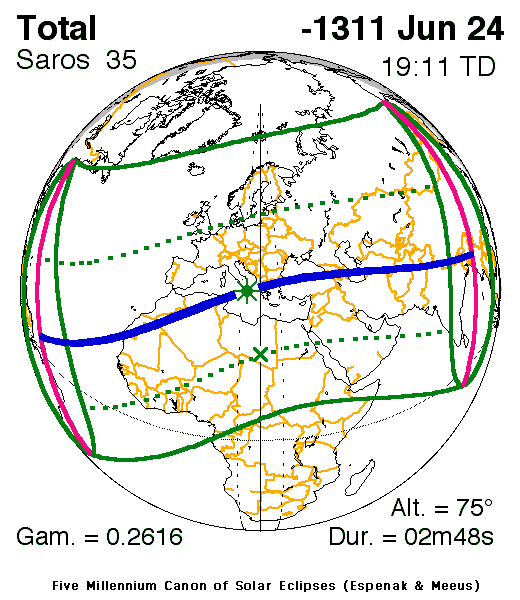
The eclipse of 1312 BC

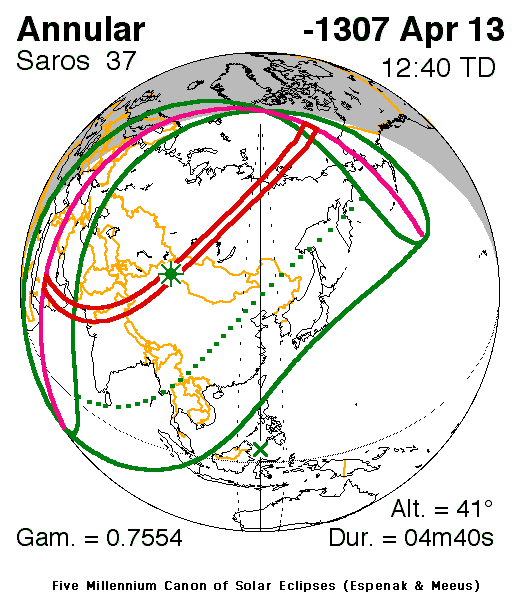
The eclipse of 1308 BC

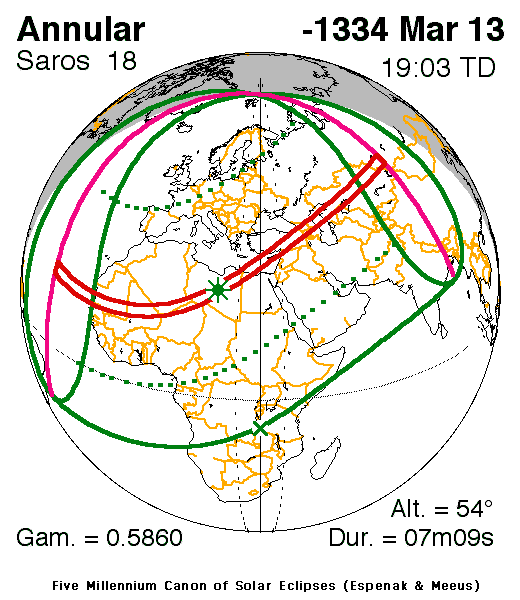
The eclipse of 1335 BC

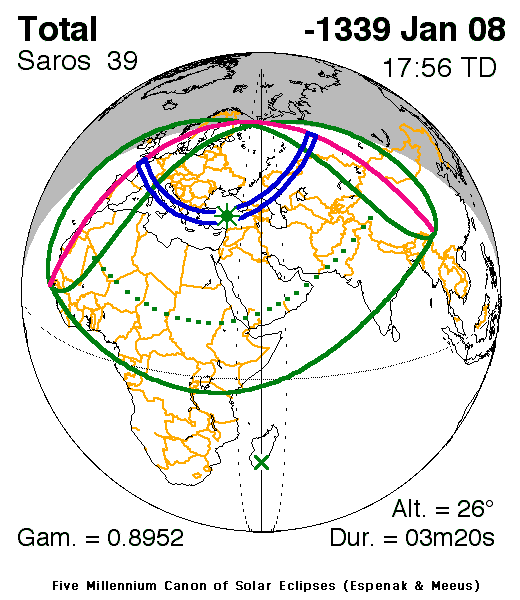
The eclipse of 1340 BC

The possible solar eclipse mentioned in a text dating to the reign of Muršili II could be of great importance for the absolute chronology of the Hittite Empire within the chronology of the ancient Near East. The text records said that in the tenth year of Mursili's reign, "the Sun gave a sign" (istanus sakiyahta), just as the king was about to launch a campaign against the Kingdom of Hayasa-Azzi in north-eastern Anatolia.

The reference in the annals was first interpreted as describing an eclipse by Emil Forrer (1926), Schorr (1928) identified it as the eclipse of the 13 March 1335 BC, visible as annular in Anatolia in the afternoon.

It is now more commonly identified as the one of 24 June 1312 BC, which was visible in totality in northern Anatolia in the afternoon. Paul Åström (1993) proposes the alternative date of 13 April 1308 BC, which would have been visible as a partial eclipse at sunrise. Peter J. Huber has suggested a date of 8 January 1340 BC.

== 1312 BC eclipse ==
The 1312 BC eclipse occurred over northern Anatolia in the early afternoon, and its effects would have been quite spectacular for Mursili and his men on campaign:

24 June 1312 BC, total eclipse, maximum at 10:44 UTC, 38.2°N 13.7°E (Sicily)

The 1312 BC date would imply that Mursili began his reign in either 1322 or 1321 BC. This date would be roughly that usually proposed for the death of Tutankhamun. It is known that Šuppiluliuma I was besieging Carchemish when he received a letter from the widow of a Pharaoh (who is called Dakhamunzu in the annals). Šuppiluliuma died shortly thereafter and his successor was Mursili II (whose brother would have been Prince Zannanza sent to Egypt where he died). Thus this appears to be a chronological anchor. However, there are other views, asserting for example that the dead Pharaoh was Akhenaten or that Tutankhamun died later.

== 1308 BC eclipse ==
In contrast, the 1308 BC eclipse was annular, and began very early in the morning over Arabia (and only penumbral over Anatolia and Syria), reaching its height over Central Asia:

13 April 1308 BC, annular eclipse (94.8%), maximum at 04:16 UTC, 44.9°N 85.7°E (Tian Shan)

== See also ==
- List of solar eclipses visible from China
