= List of solar eclipses visible from China =

This list of solar eclipses seen from China describes precise visibility information for solar eclipses and major cities in China.

A solar eclipse occurs when the Moon passes between Earth and the Sun, thereby obscuring Earth's view of the Sun. Eclipses can be total, annular, or partial. The zone of a total eclipse where the sky appears dark is often just a few miles wide. This is known as the path of totality.

An eclipse that is "visible from Asia" in general terms might not be visible at all at a specific location. E.g., parts of Sri Lanka may fall into darkness for a few seconds, people in Indonesia, India, and Pakistan enjoy the partial eclipse, and Beijing may be too far away to fall under the Moon's shadow.

Occasionally a major city lies in the direct path of an annular or total eclipse, which is of great interest to astronomy buffs – some people make travel arrangements years in advance to observe eclipses. Nearly two-thirds of the Earth's surface is covered by oceans, thus a total eclipse at a major metropolitan area where hotels and amenities are available is an event of considerable interest.

Eclipses were of great interest to ancient Chinese astronomers, who viewed them as omens. Many are recorded in the Spring and Autumn Annals and in the Twenty-Four Histories, which has been helpful to historians in assigning absolute dates to events from Chinese history.

== Eclipses between 1801 and 2200 ==
1801-1900

- 1802 Aug 28 (annular)
- 1814 Jul 17 (total)
- 1816 Nov 19 (total)
- 1817 Nov 09 (total)
- 1824 Jun 27 (total)
- 1828 Apr 14 (annular)
- 1829 Sep 28 (annular)
- 1840 Mar 04 (annular)
- 1842 Jul 08 (total)
- 1849 Feb 23 (annular)
- 1852 Dec 11 (total)
- 1857 Sep 18 (annular)
- 1869 Aug 08 (total)
- 1872 Jun 06 (annular)
- 1874 Oct 10 (annular)
- 1875 Apr 06 (total)
- 1882 May 17 (total)
- 1883 Oct 31 (annular)
- 1887 Aug 19 (total)
- 1894 Apr 06 (hybrid)
- 1898 Jan 22 (total)

1901-2000

- 1903 Mar 29 (annular)
- 1907 Jan 14 (total)
- 1911 Oct 22 (annular)
- 1936 Jun 19 (total)
- 1941 Sep 21 (total)
- 1943 Feb 05 (total)
- 1948 May 09 (annular)
- 1955 Dec 14 (annular)
- 1958 Apr 19 (annular)
- 1965 Nov 23 (annular)
- 1966 May 20 (annular)
- 1968 Sep 22 (total)
- 1976 Apr 29 (annular)
- 1980 Feb 16 (total)
- 1987 Sep 23 (annular)
- 1997 Mar 09 (total)

2001-2100

- 2008 Aug 01 (total)
- 2009 Jul 22 (total)
- 2010 Jan 15 (annular)
- 2012 May 21 (annular)
- 2020 Jun 21 (annular)
- 2030 Jun 01 (annular)
- 2034 Mar 20 (total)
- 2035 Sep 02 (total)
- 2041 Oct 25 (annular)
- 2057 Jul 02 (annular)
- 2060 Apr 30 (total)
- 2063 Aug 24 (total)
- 2064 Feb 17 (annular)
- 2070 Apr 11 (total)
- 2074 Jan 27 (annular)
- 2085 Jun 22 (annular)
- 2088 Apr 21 (total)
- 2089 Oct 04 (total)
- 2095 Nov 27 (annular)

2101-2200

- 2115 May 24 (total)
- 2117 Sep 26 (total)
- 2118 Mar 22 (annular)
- 2124 May 14 (total)
- 2126 Oct 16 (total)
- 2128 Mar 01 (annular)
- 2129 Aug 15 (annular)
- 2139 Jul 26 (annular)
- 2142 May 25 (total)
- 2149 Dec 30 (annular)
- 2155 Apr 02 (annular)
- 2157 Aug 05 (annular)
- 2158 Jan 30 (annular)
- 2162 Nov 07 (total)
- 2168 Jan 10 (annular)
- 2169 Jun 25 (total)
- 2171 Oct 29 (total)
- 2180 Nov 17 (total)
- 2182 Apr 03 (hybrid)
- 2187 Jul 06 (total)

== Last and next eclipses for major cities ==
Name	Geographical coordinate	Total		Annular	
Name	Geographical coordinate	Last	Next	Last	Next
Beijing	39°54.4′N 116°23.5′E	1277 Oct 28	2035 Sep 02	2020 Jun 21	2118 Mar 22
Shanghai	31°13.9′N 121°28.2′E	2009 Jul 22	2309 Jun 09	1987 Sep 23	2312 Apr 07
Tianjin	39°07.5′N 117°11.7′E	1277 Oct 28	2187 Jul 06	1802 Aug 28	2118 Mar 22
Chongqing	29°33.6′N 106°34.4′E	2009 Jul 22	2241 Aug 08	2010 Jan 15	2429 Jul 02
Hong Kong	22°17.0′N 114°09.0′E	1814 Jul 17	2881 Mar 21	2012 May 21	2320 May 9
Macau	22°12.0′N 113°33.0′E	1814 Jul 17	2881 Mar 21	2012 May 21	2685 March 27

== Eclipses between 1001 and 3000 for major cities ==
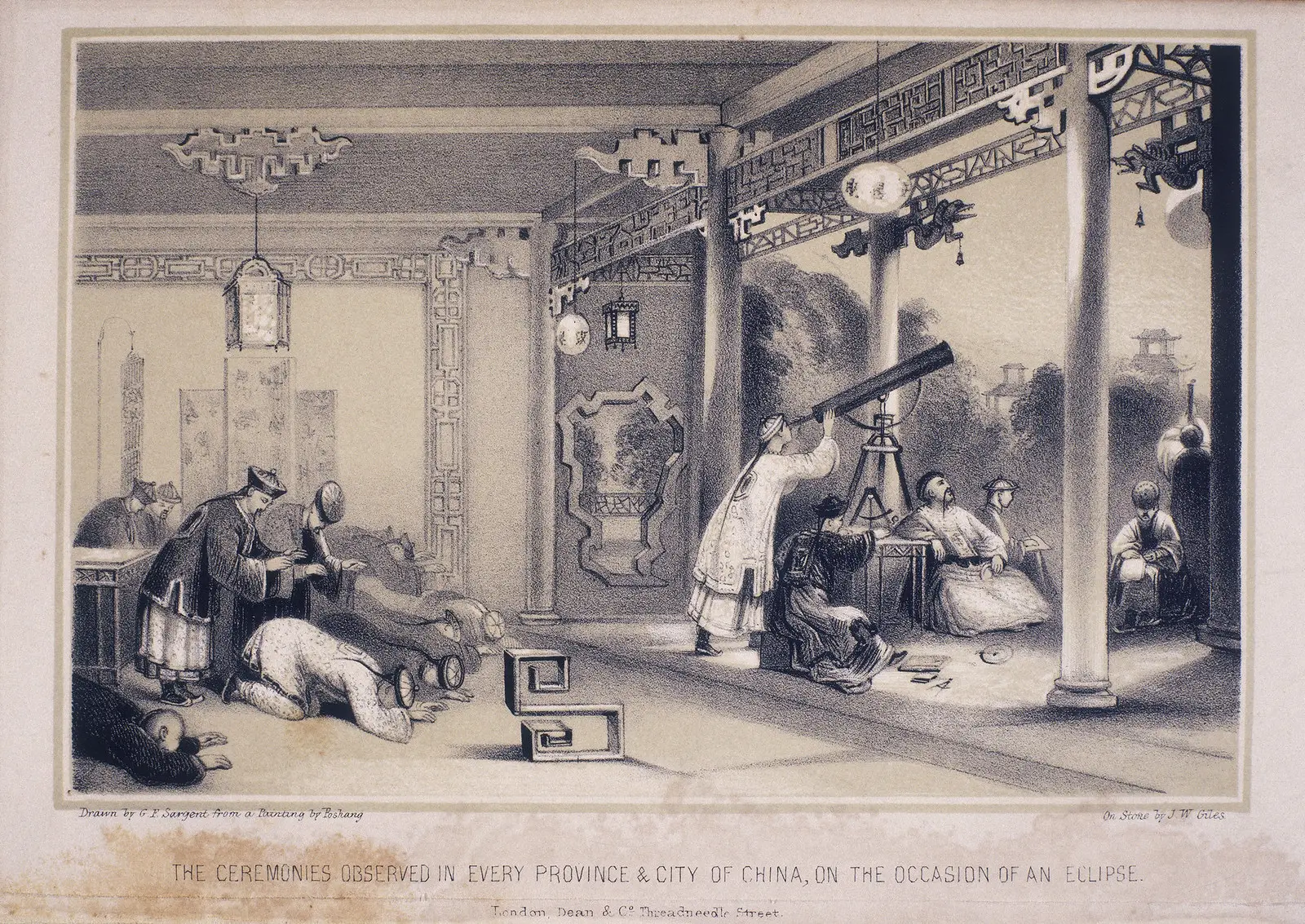
Chinese people observing an eclipse in the early 19th century

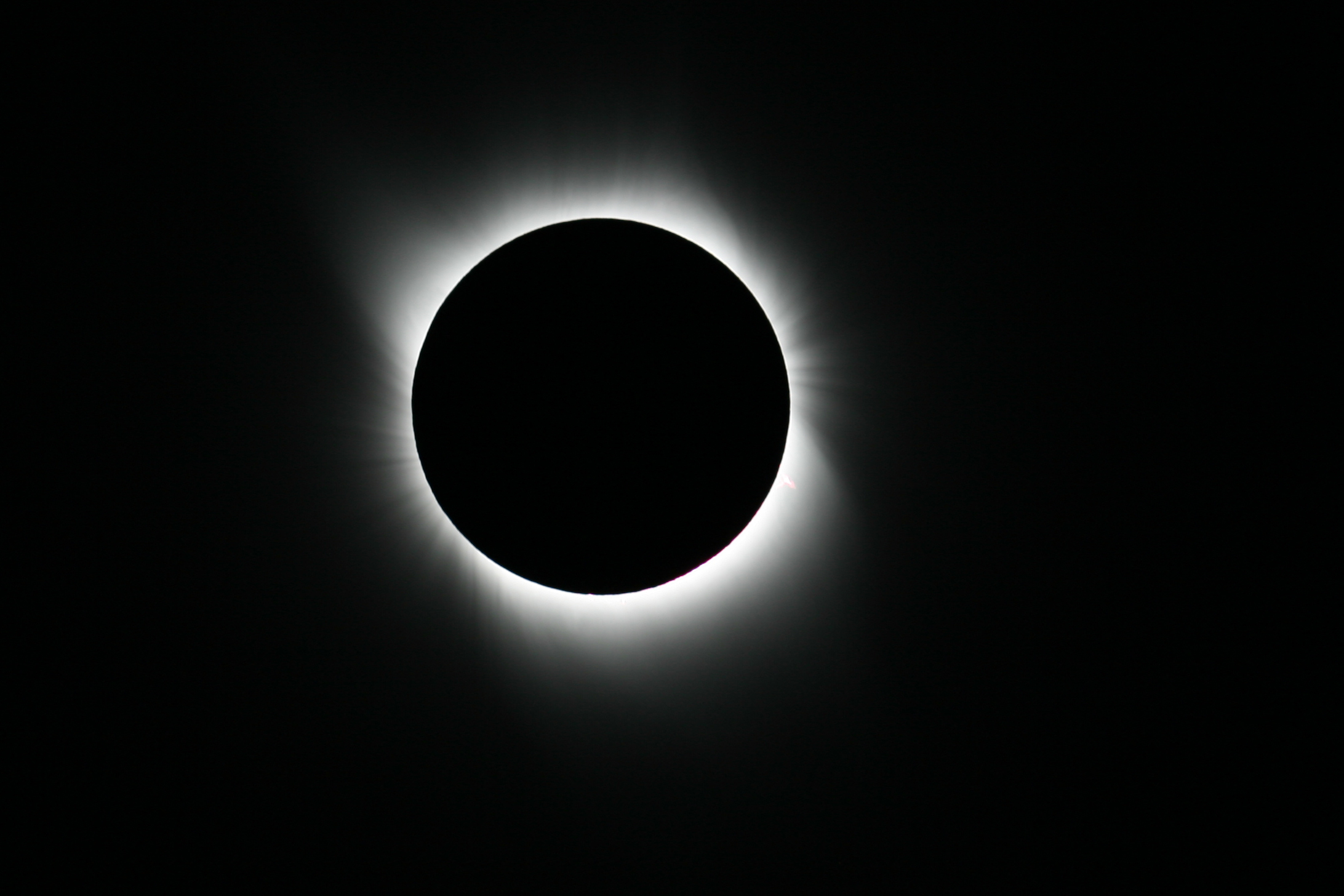
August 2008 solar eclipse as seen from Yiwu County, Xinjiang

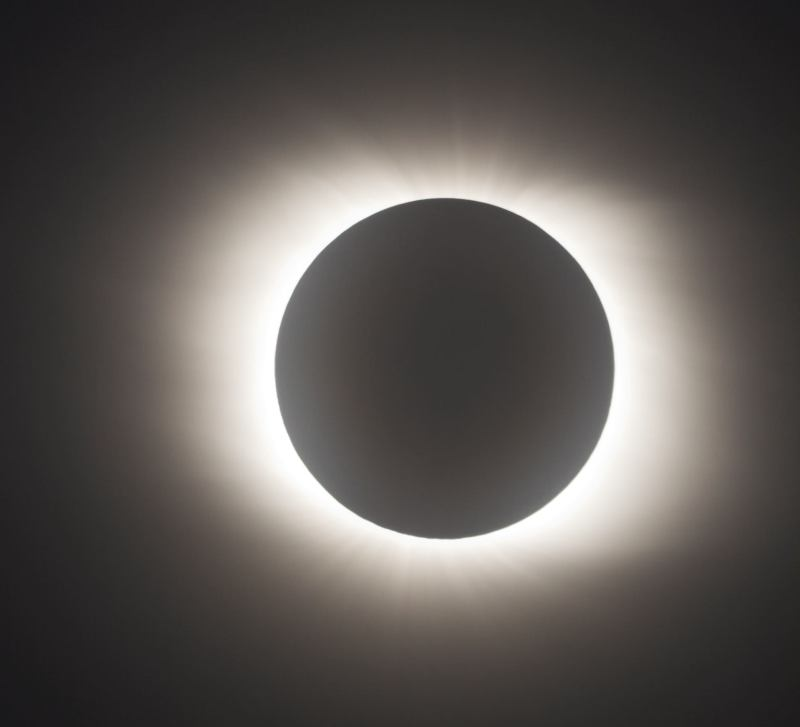
July 2009 solar eclipse, as seen from Hangzhou, Zhejiang

=== Beijing ===
- 1005 Jan 13 03:09 UTC (total)
- 1189 Feb 17 03:37 UTC (annular)
- 1277 Oct 28 05:19 UTC (total)
- 1292 Jan 21 05:28 UTC (annular)
- 1561 Feb 14 09:25 UTC (annular)
- 1665 Jan 16 08:41 UTC (annular)
- 1802 Aug 28 07:46 UTC (annular)
- 2035 Sep 02 00:33 UTC (total)
- 2118 Mar 22 07:33 UTC (annular)
- 2187 Jul 06 09:11 UTC (total)
- 2609 Apr 26 07:46 UTC (total)
- 2636 May 26 21:11 UTC (total)
- 2686 Sep 09 23:13 UTC (annular)
- 2739 Apr 30 00:42 UTC (annular)
- 2762 Aug 12 01:42 UTC (total)
- 2894 Dec 18 06:36 UTC (annular)

=== Shanghai ===
- 1069 Jul 21 00:05 UTC (annular)
- 1080 Dec 14 02:39 UTC (annular)
- 1107 Dec 16 07:49 UTC (annular)
- 1275 Jun 25 02:13 UTC (total)
- 1575 May 10 06:37 UTC (total)
- 1731 Dec 28 23:34 UTC (annular)
- 1802 Aug 28 08:09 UTC (annular)
- 1987 Sep 23 02:06 UTC (annular)
- 2009 Jul 22 01:39 UTC (total)
- 2309 Jun 09 06:01 UTC (total)
- 2312 Apr 07 21:53 UTC (annular)
- 2357 May 19 23:32 UTC (annular)
- 2440 Nov 24 23:32 UTC (annular)

=== Tianjin ===
- 1189 Feb 17 03:37 UTC (annular)
- 1277 Oct 28 05:21 UTC (total)
- 1292 Jan 21 05:30 UTC (annular)
- 1665 Jan 16 08:42 UTC (annular)
- 1802 Aug 28 07:48 UTC (annular)
- 2118 Mar 22 07:33 UTC (annular)
- 2187 Jul 06 09:13 UTC (total)
- 2415 Apr 10 02:49 UTC (total)
- 2439 Jun 11 23:52 UTC (annular)
- 2636 May 26 21:09 UTC (total)
- 2686 Sep 09 23:12 UTC (annular)
- 2739 Apr 30 00:41 UTC (annular)
- 2762 Aug 12 01:43 UTC (total)
- 2894 Dec 18 06:38 UTC (annular)

=== Chongqing ===
- 1135 Jan 16 03:05 UTC (annular)
- 1397 May 26 22:23 UTC (total)
- 1824 Jun 26 22:10 UTC (total)
- 2009 Jul 22 01:15 UTC (total)
- 2010 Jan 15 08:50 UTC (annular)
- 2241 Aug 08 06:20 UTC (total)
- 2429 Jul 02 01:33 UTC (annular)
- 2533 May 25 10:42 UTC (annular)
- 2610 Oct 09 00:11 UTC (annular)
- 2642 Jul 19 00:17 UTC (annular)
- 2656 Oct 10 03:55 UTC (total)
- 2840 Nov 15 06:27 UTC (annular)
- 2902 Jul 26 07:45 UTC (total)

== Last and next eclipses for Hong Kong ==
- 0030 Nov 14 (total)
- 0060 Oct 13 (annular)
- 0073 Jul 23 (total)
- 0168 Dec 17 (annular)
- 0327 Jun 06 (total)
- 0392 Jul 07 (annular)
- 0438 Dec 03 (total)
- 0888 Apr 15 (annular)
- 1040 Dec 02 (hybrid)
- 1265 Jan 19 (annular)
- 1444 Nov 10 (hybrid)
- 1610 Dec 15 (annular)
- 1658 Jun 01 (annular)
- 1742 Mar 03 (total)
- 1785 Aug 05 (annular)
- 1789 Nov 17 (hybrid)
- 1814 Jul 17 (total)
- 1955 Dec 14 (annular)
- 1958 Apr 19 (annular)
- 2012 May 20 (annular)
- 2320 May 9 (annular)
- 2685 Mar 27 (annular)
- 2867 Dec 17 (annular)
- 2881 Mar 21 (total)
- 2888 May 2 (annular)
- 2907 Oct 28 (annular)
- 2910 Aug 26 (hybrid)
- 2935 Apr 24 (total)

== Last and next eclipses for Macau ==
- -1012 Nov 14 (annular)
- -0979 Feb 19 (annular)
- -0665 Mar 27 (total)
- -0624 Jul 19 (annular)
- -0143 Sep 08 (annular)
- -0122 Jan 23 (annular)
- 0030 Nov 14 (total)
- 0060 Oct 13 (annular)
- 0168 Dec 17 (annular)
- 0327 Jun 06 (total)
- 0438 Dec 03 (total)
- 0888 Apr 15 (annular)
- 1040 Feb 15 (hybrid)
- 1265 Jan 19 (annular)
- 1610 Dec 15 (annular)
- 1658 Jan 01 (annular)
- 1742 Jun 03 (total)
- 1785 Aug 05 (annular)
- 1814 Jul 17 (total)
- 2012 May 20 (annular)
- 2685 Mar 27 (annular)
- 2867 Dec 17 (annular)
- 2881 Mar 21 (total)
- 2888 May 2 (annular)
- 2907 Oct 28 (annular)
- 2910 Aug 26 (hybrid)
- 2935 Apr 24 (total)
