= Solar eclipse of June 21, 2020 =

21st-century annular solar eclipse

- Annular eclipse
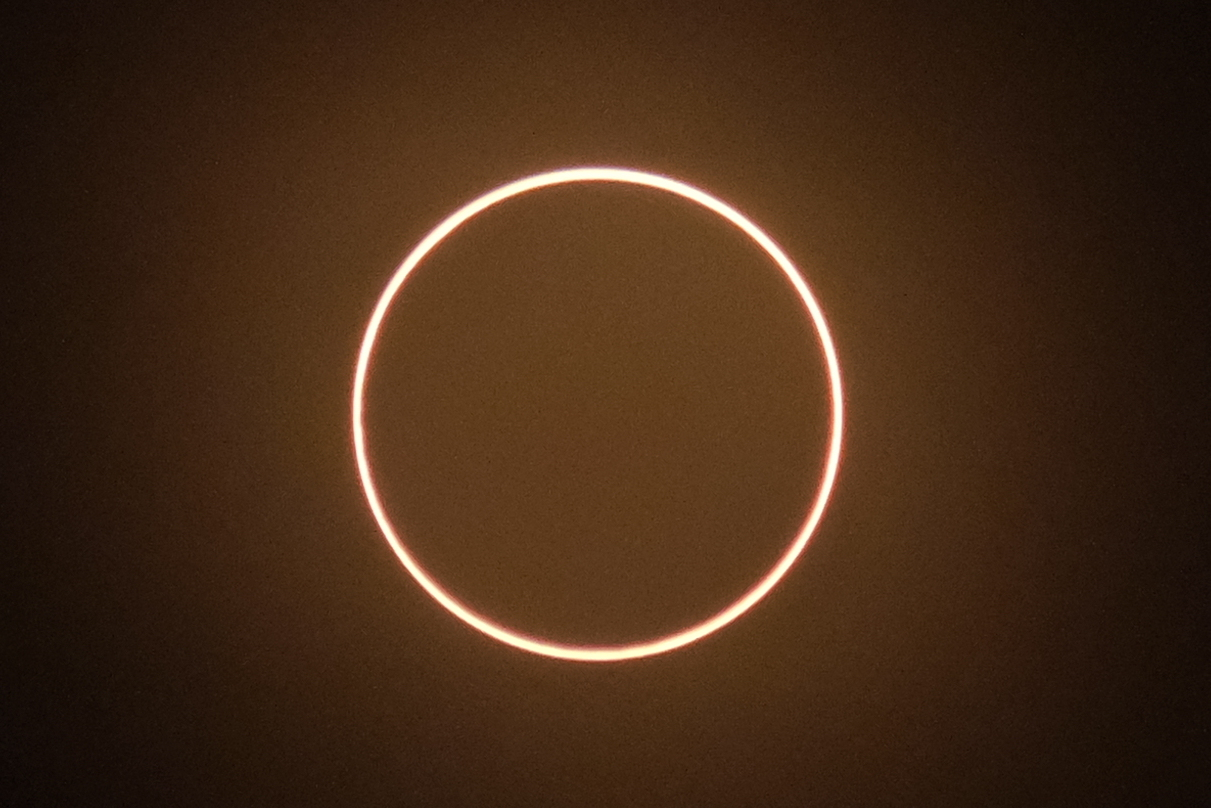
- Annularity as seen from Beigang, Yunlin, Taiwan

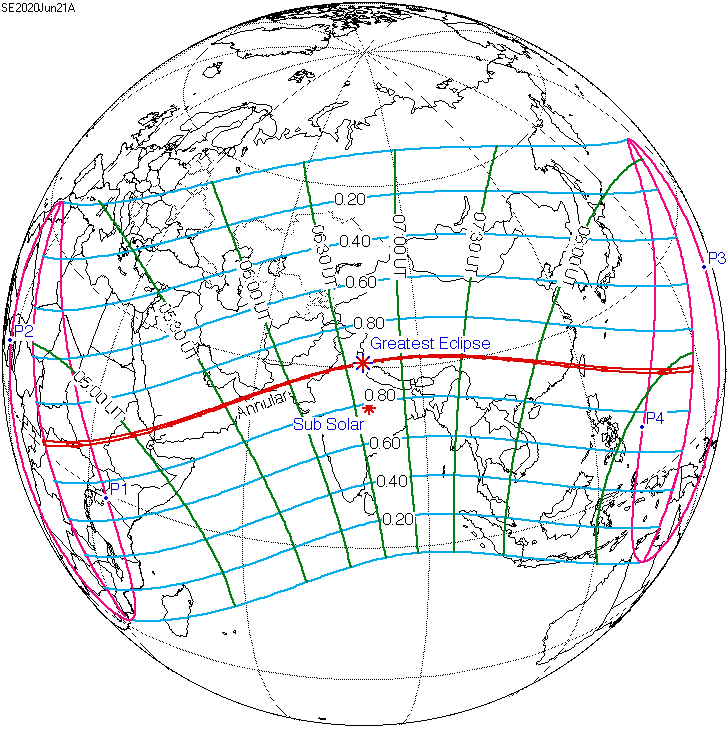
- Map
- Gamma: 0.1209
- Magnitude: 0.994

Maximum eclipse
- Duration: 38 s (0 min 38 s)
- Coordinates: 30.5°N 79.7°E
- Max. width of band: 21 km (13 mi)

Times (UTC)
- Greatest eclipse: 6:41:15

References
- Saros: 137 (36 of 70)
- Catalog # (SE5000): 9553

An annular solar eclipse occurred at the Moon’s ascending node of orbit on Sunday, June 21, 2020, with a magnitude of 0.994. A solar eclipse occurs when the Moon passes between Earth and the Sun, thereby totally or partly obscuring the Sun for a viewer on Earth. An annular solar eclipse occurs when the Moon's apparent diameter is smaller than the Sun's, blocking most of the Sun's light and causing the Sun to look like an annulus (ring). An annular eclipse appears as a partial eclipse over a region of the Earth thousands of kilometres wide. Occurring about 6.2 days after apogee (on June 15, 2020, at 1:55 UTC), the Moon's apparent diameter was smaller.

== Path ==
The path of this annular eclipse passed through parts of the Democratic Republic of the Congo, South Sudan, Ethiopia, and Eritrea in Africa; the southern Arabian Peninsula, including Yemen, Oman, and southern Saudi Arabia; parts of South Asia and the Himalayas, including southern Pakistan and northern India; and parts of East Asia, including South China and Taiwan. A partial eclipse was visible throughout much of the rest of Africa, Southeast Europe, most of Asia, and in New Guinea and northern Australia just before sunset. In Europe, the partial eclipse was visible to places southeast of the line passing through parts of Italy, Hungary, Ukraine, and southwestern Russia.

Animated path of the eclipse

Animation of images from Himawari 8 showing the Moon's shadow moving across the Earth.

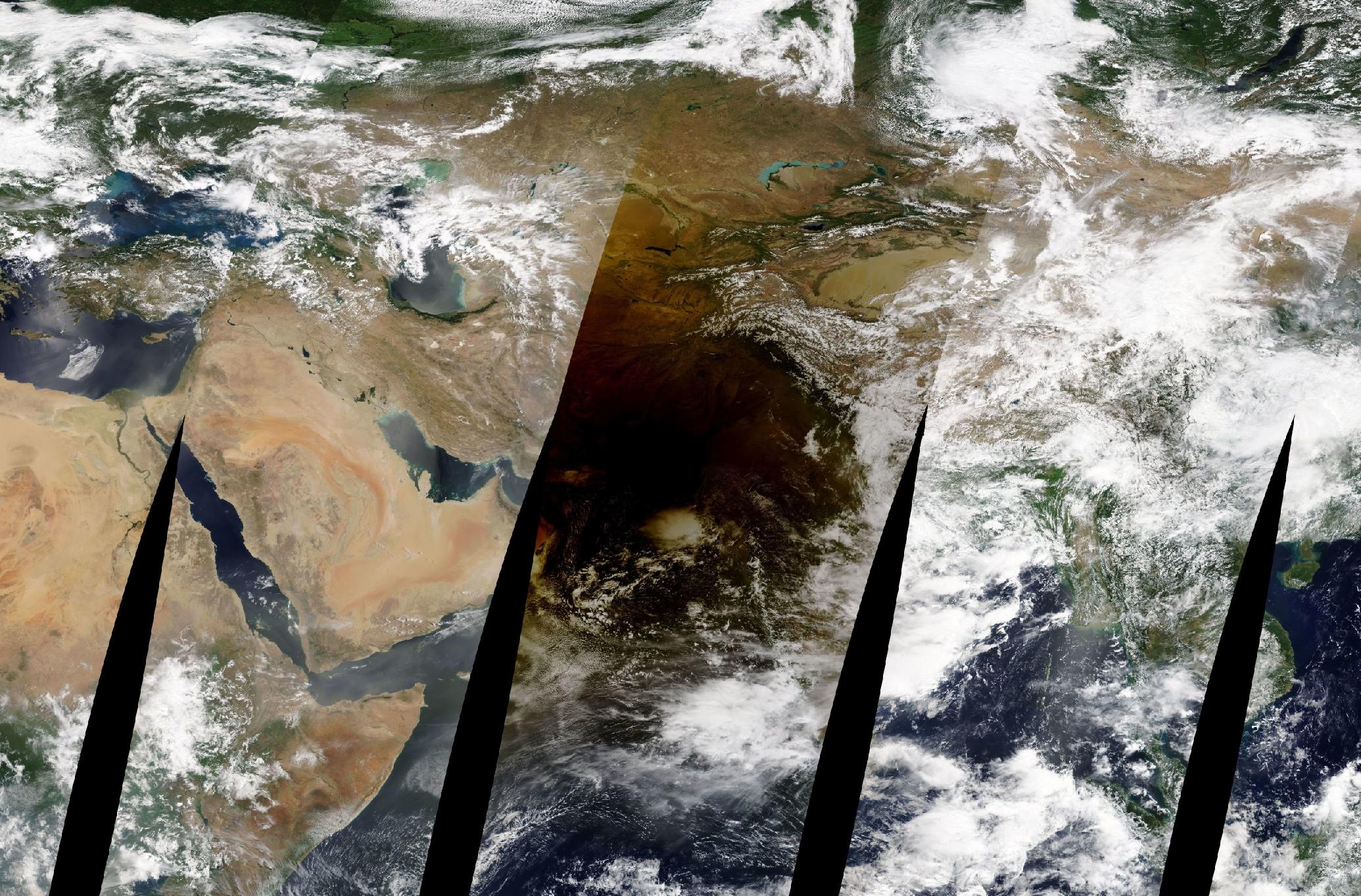
The effect of the solar eclipse (Moon shadow) on Terra satellite image In this photo, the shadow of the Moon has fallen over Iran, Pakistan and Afghanistan. date: 2020-06-21

== Eclipse timing ==
=== Places experiencing annular eclipse ===
Solar Eclipse of June 21, 2020 (Local Times)
Country or territory	City or place	Start of partial eclipse	Start of annular eclipse	Maximum eclipse	End of annular eclipse	End of partial eclipse	Duration of annularity (min:s)	Duration of eclipse (hr:min)	Maximum coverage
Republic of the Congo	Impfondo	05:43:11 (sunrise)	05:48:05	05:48:40	05:49:14	06:52:20	1:09	1:09	95.68%
Central African Republic	Obo	05:02:51 (sunrise)	05:49:40	05:50:18	05:50:56	06:59:22	1:16	1:57	96.20%
Ethiopia	Lalibela	06:52:22	07:59:40	08:00:14	08:00:48	09:20:02	1:08	2:28	97.06%
Pakistan	Sukkur	09:33:25	11:07:30	11:07:50	11:08:08	12:54:16	0:38	3:21	98.79%
Pakistan	Pano Aqil	09:34:04	11:08:21	11:08:40	11:09:00	12:55:06	0:39	3:21	98.79%
India	New Mandi Gharsana	10:12:30	11:50:12	11:50:27	11:50:42	13:37:08	0:30	3:25	98.89%
India	Sirsa	10:16:56	11:56:07	11:56:21	11:56:35	13:42:43	0:28	3:26	98.92%
India	Dehradun	10:24:10	12:05:19	12:05:30	12:05:40	13:50:46	0:21	3:27	98.96%
India	New Tehri	10:25:04	12:06:23	12:06:38	12:06:53	13:51:47	0:30	3:27	98.96%
China	Xiamen	14:43:43	16:10:26	16:10:54	16:11:22	17:24:21	0:56	2:41	97.75%

=== Places experiencing partial eclipse ===
Solar Eclipse of June 21, 2020 (Local Times)
Country or territory	City or place	Start of partial eclipse	Maximum eclipse	End of partial eclipse	Duration of eclipse (hr:min)	Maximum coverage
Democratic Republic of the Congo	Mbandaka	05:45:06 (sunrise)	05:47:49	06:51:24	1:06	92.76%
Central African Republic	Bangui	05:36:25 (sunrise)	05:50:10	06:54:13	1:18	88.49%
South Sudan	Juba	06:47:57	07:50:34	09:02:49	2:19	87.91%
Ethiopia	Addis Ababa	06:49:50	07:56:55	09:15:43	2:26	89.09%
Sudan	Khartoum	05:57:24	07:01:08	08:14:38	2:17	75.56%
Djibouti	Djibouti	06:52:18	08:02:34	09:25:58	2:34	89.44%
Eritrea	Asmara	06:55:54	08:04:00	09:23:52	2:28	87.79%
Yemen	Sanaa	06:56:15	08:08:01	09:33:15	2:37	97.33%
Saudi Arabia	Riyadh	07:10:09	08:23:36	09:49:42	2:40	73.19%
Qatar	Doha	07:12:49	08:30:35	10:02:12	2:49	79.67%
Bahrain	Manama	07:14:07	08:30:47	10:00:40	2:47	75.06%
United Arab Emirates	Dubai	08:14:50	09:36:12	11:12:15	2:57	86.35%
Oman	Muscat	08:14:38	09:39:14	11:19:37	3:05	97.53%
Pakistan	Karachi	09:26:26	10:59:26	12:46:39	3:20	91.49%
Afghanistan	Kabul	09:16:20	10:46:56	12:25:47	3:09	75.03%
Pakistan	Islamabad	09:50:29	11:25:11	13:06:30	3:16	82.01%
Pakistan	Lahore	09:48:49	11:26:19	13:10:29	3:22	91.21%
India	New Delhi	10:20:05	12:01:47	13:48:48	3:29	93.75%
Nepal	Kathmandu	10:54:03	12:41:11	14:24:45	3:31	85.97%
Bhutan	Thimphu	11:21:23	13:09:30	14:49:24	3:28	84.78%
Bangladesh	Dhaka	11:23:09	13:12:38	14:52:13	3:29	70.14%
China	Lhasa	13:26:49	15:13:16	16:50:51	3:24	93.78%
China	Chongqing	14:11:45	15:48:56	17:11:46	3:00	94.77%
Vietnam	Hanoi	13:16:18	14:55:55	16:18:27	3:02	70.98%
China	Shanghai	14:45:45	16:06:27	17:16:12	2:30	70.99%
Hong Kong	Hong Kong	14:37:10	16:08:28	17:24:35	2:47	86.00%
Taiwan	Taipei	14:50:04	16:13:36	17:24:32	2:34	91.71%
Philippines	Manila	15:01:12	16:23:03	17:31:43	2:31	68.37%
Northern Mariana Islands	Saipan	17:25:21	18:29:57	18:49:42 (sunset)	1:24	88.10%
Guam	Hagåtña	17:25:57	18:31:11	18:50:27 (sunset)	1:25	95.18%

== Gallery ==
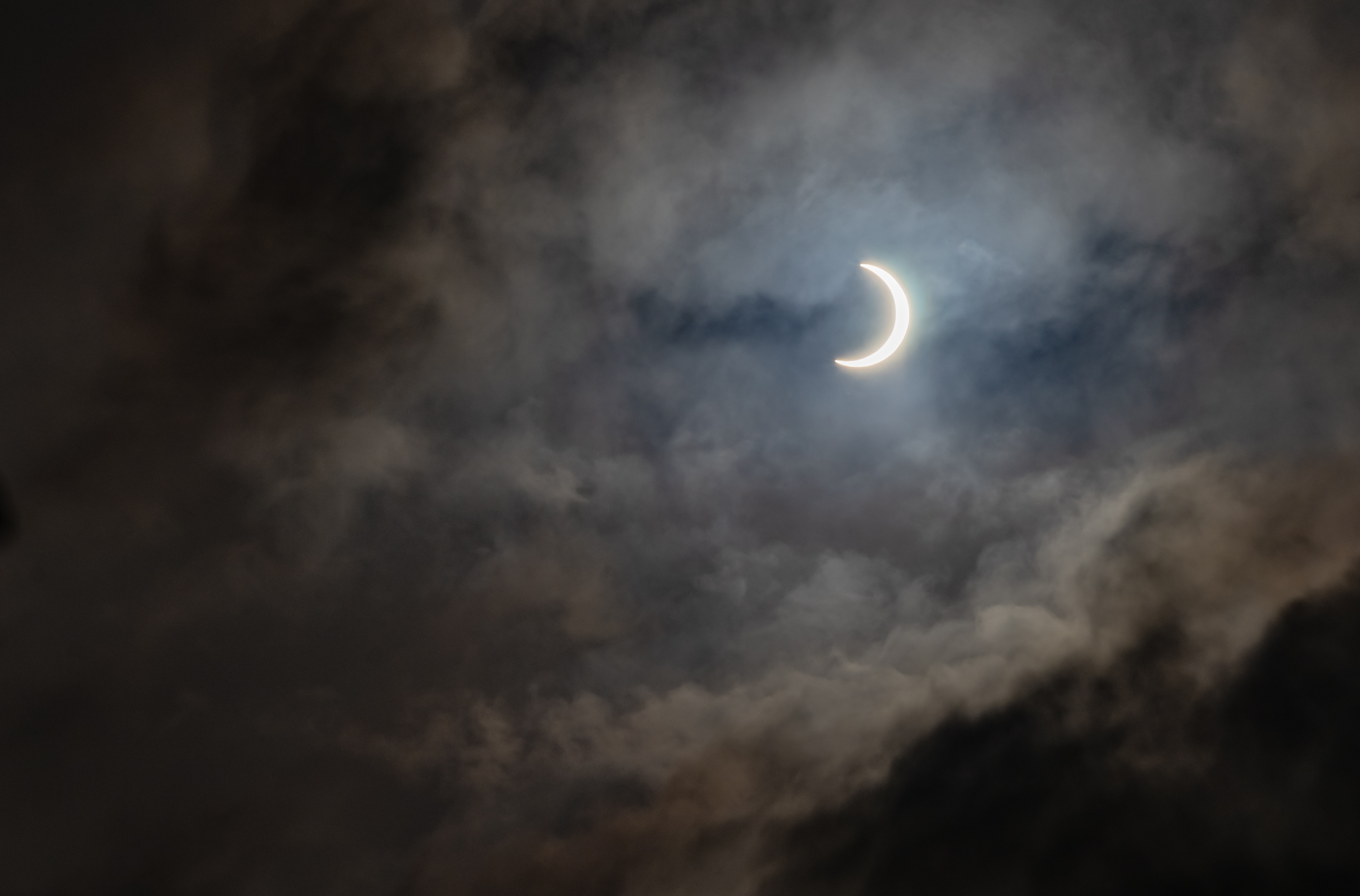
Partial from Addis Ababa, Ethiopia, 4:53 UTC

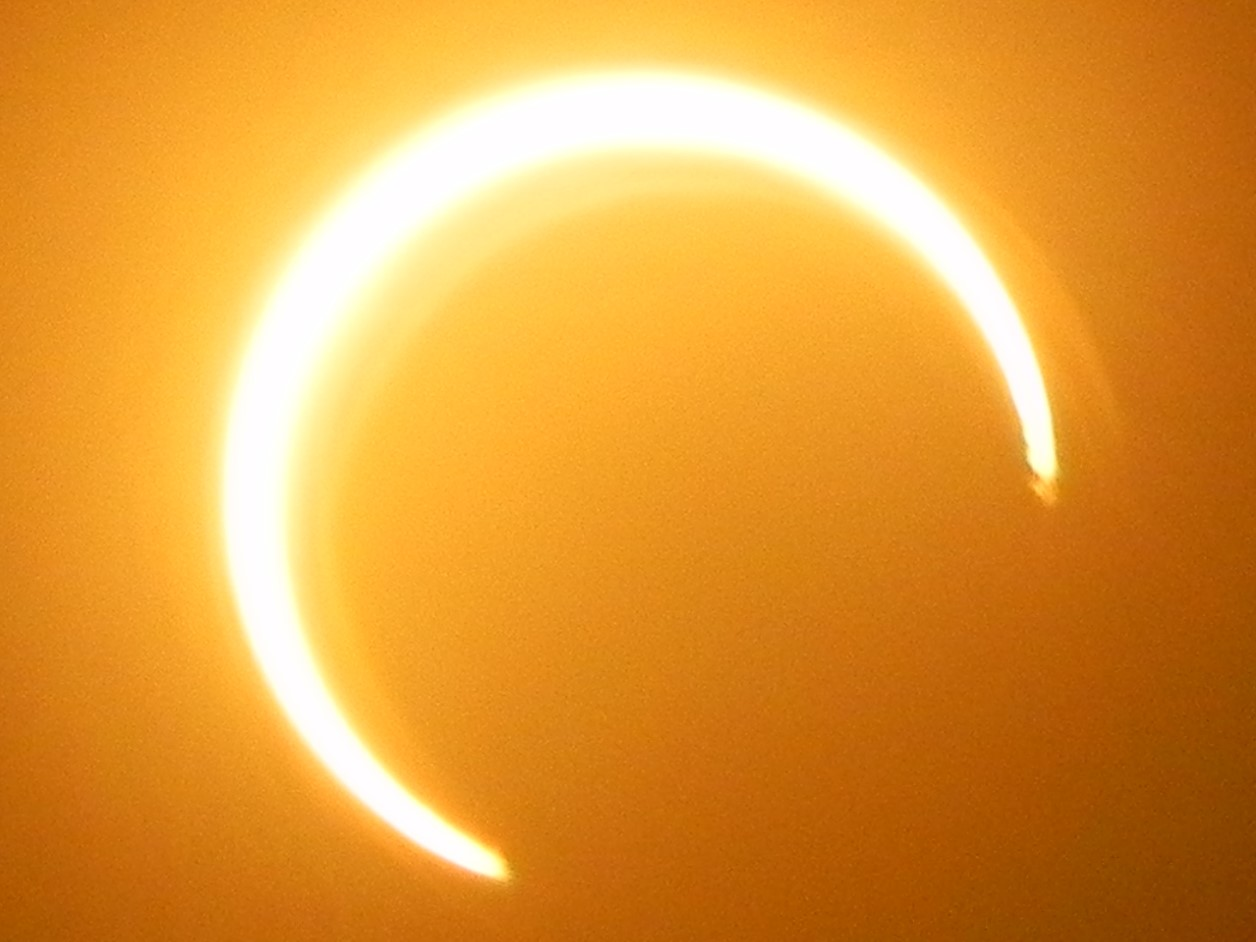
Partial from Sana'a, Yemen, 5:09 UTC

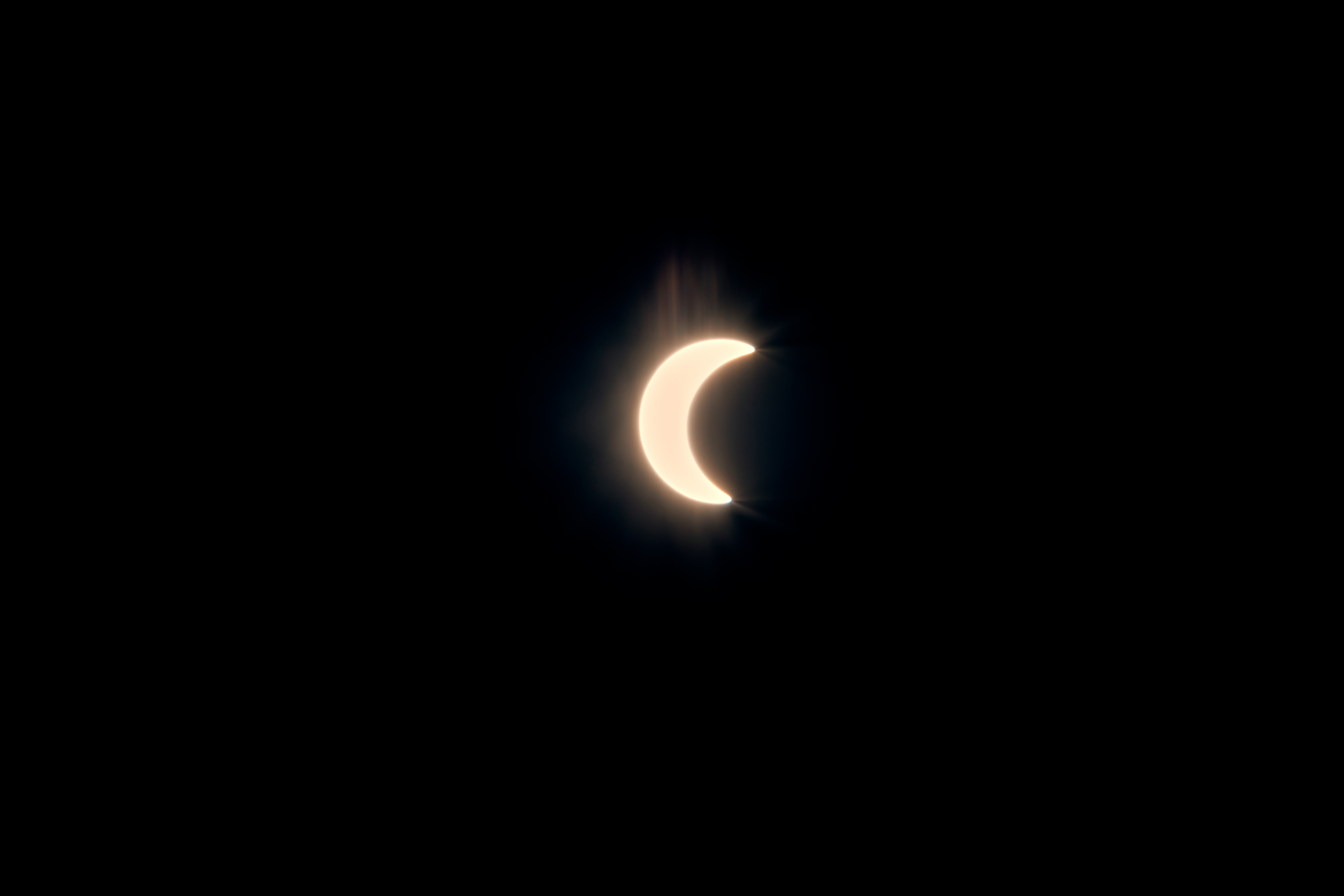
Partial from Riyadh, Saudi Arabia, 5:11 UTC

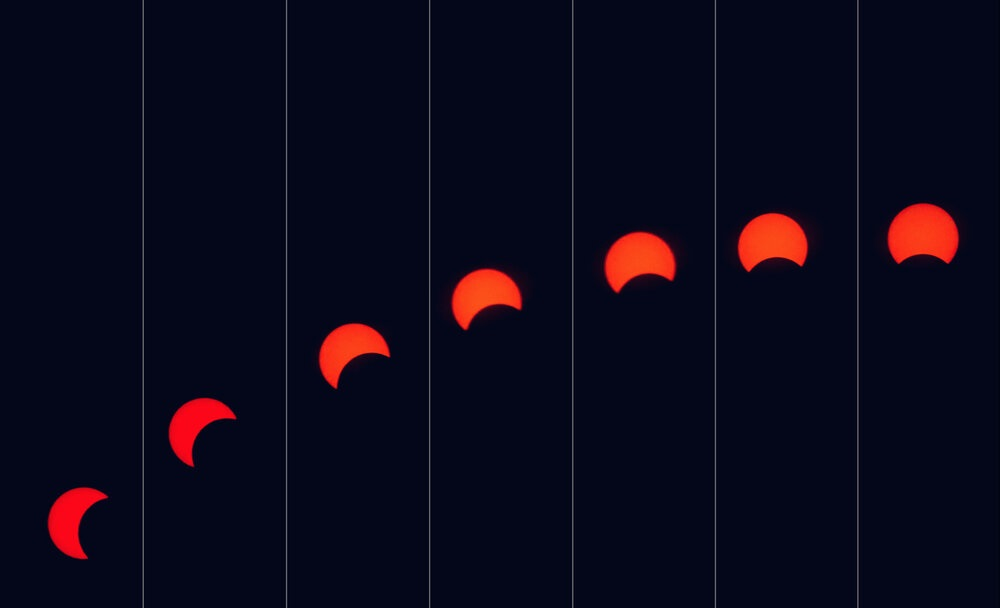
Eclipse progression from Tehran, Iran

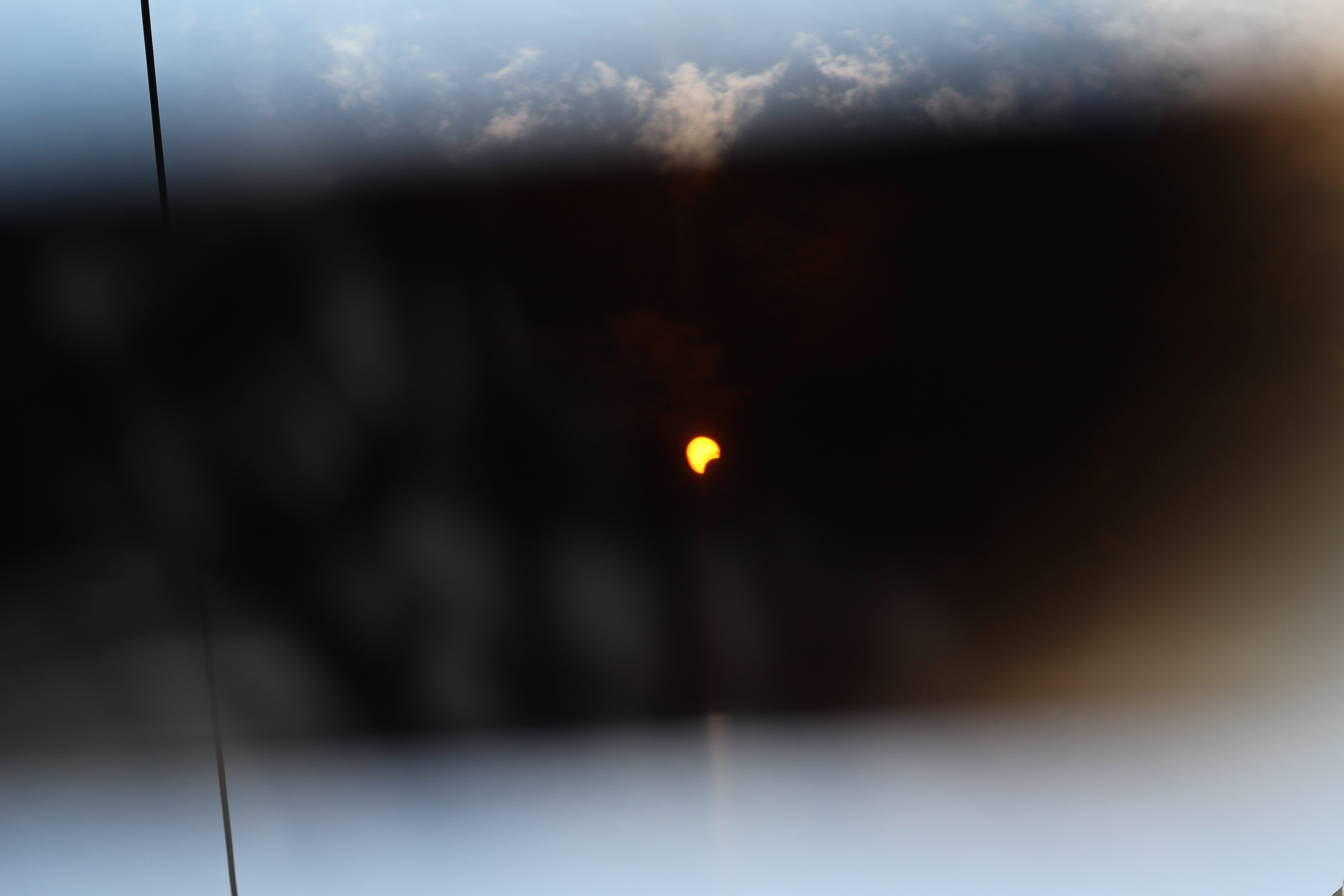
Partial from Gyumri, Armenia, 5:45 UTC

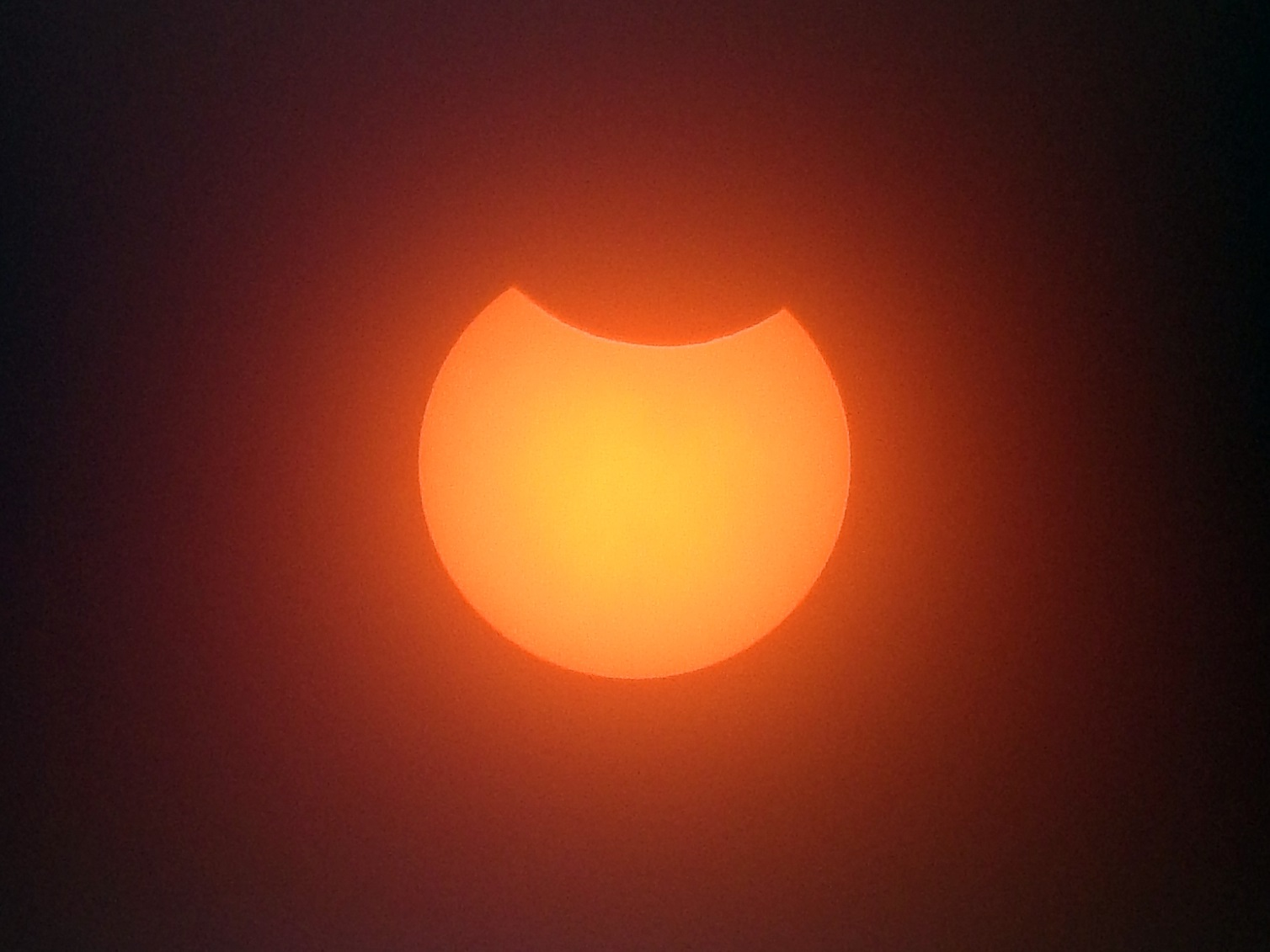
Partial from Colombo, Sri Lanka, 5:48 UTC

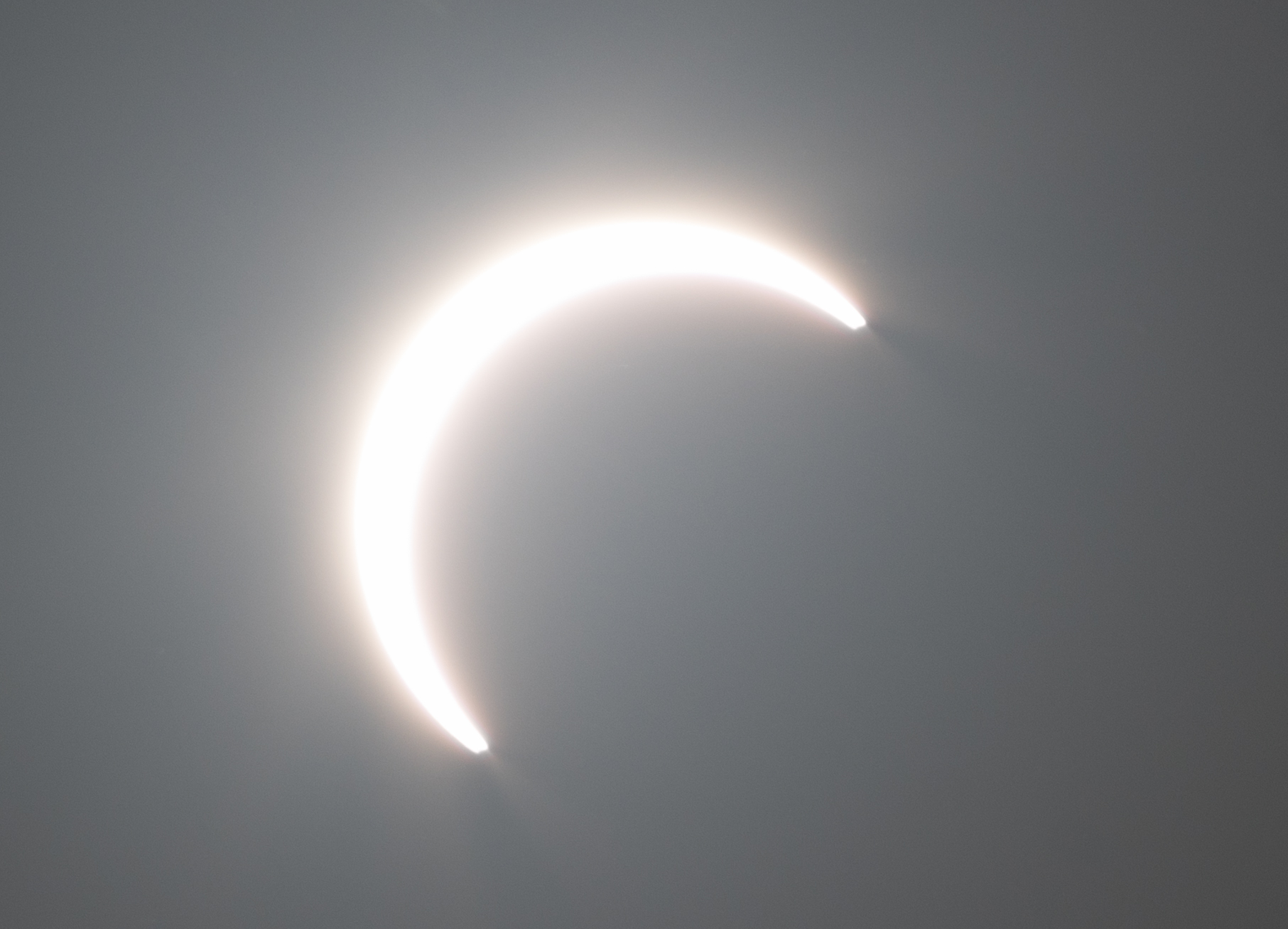
Partial from Lahore, Pakistan, 6:49 UTC

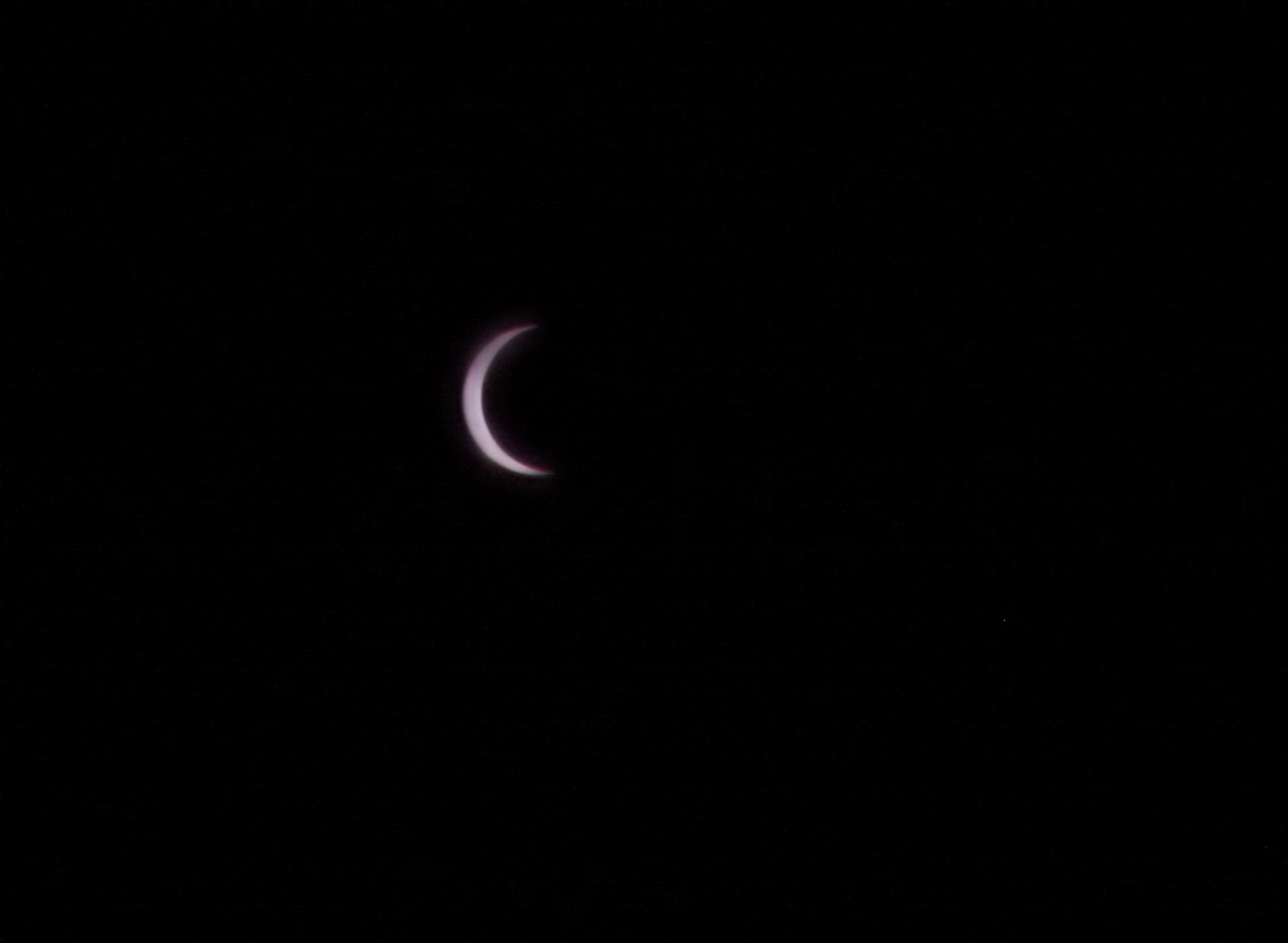
Partial from Kathmandu, Nepal, 6:51 UTC

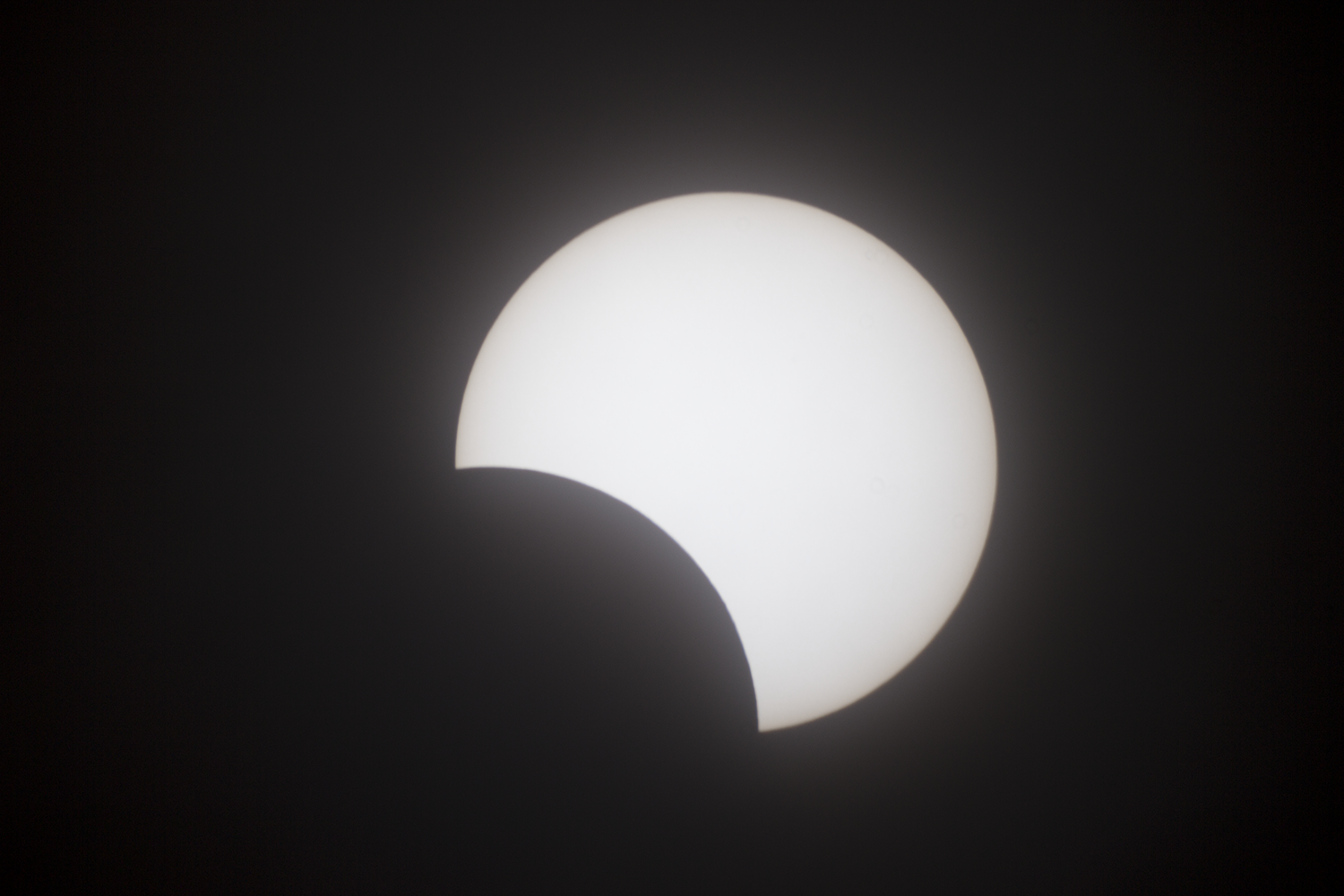
Partial from Irkutsk, Russia, ~7:22 UTC

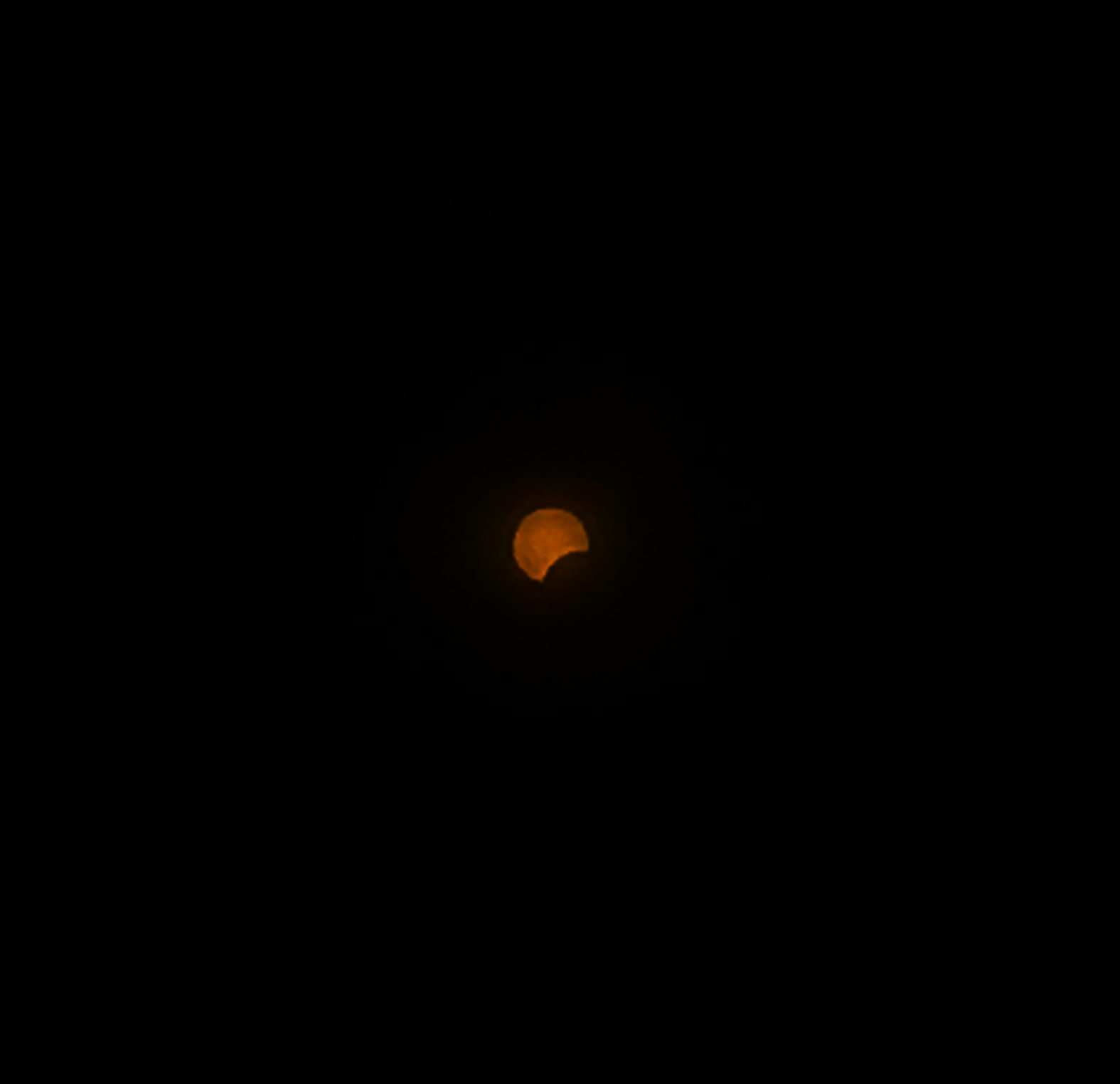
Partial from Bacoor, Philippines, 7:31 UTC

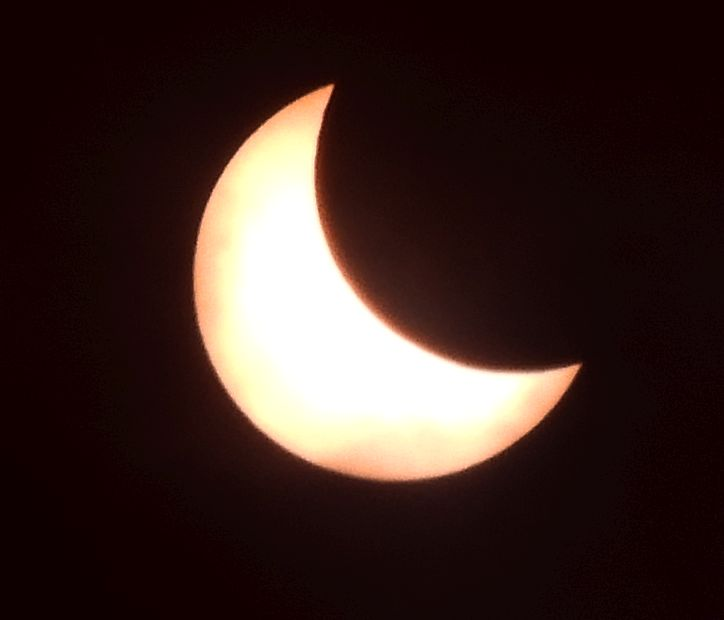
Partial from Kolkata, India, 7:42 UTC

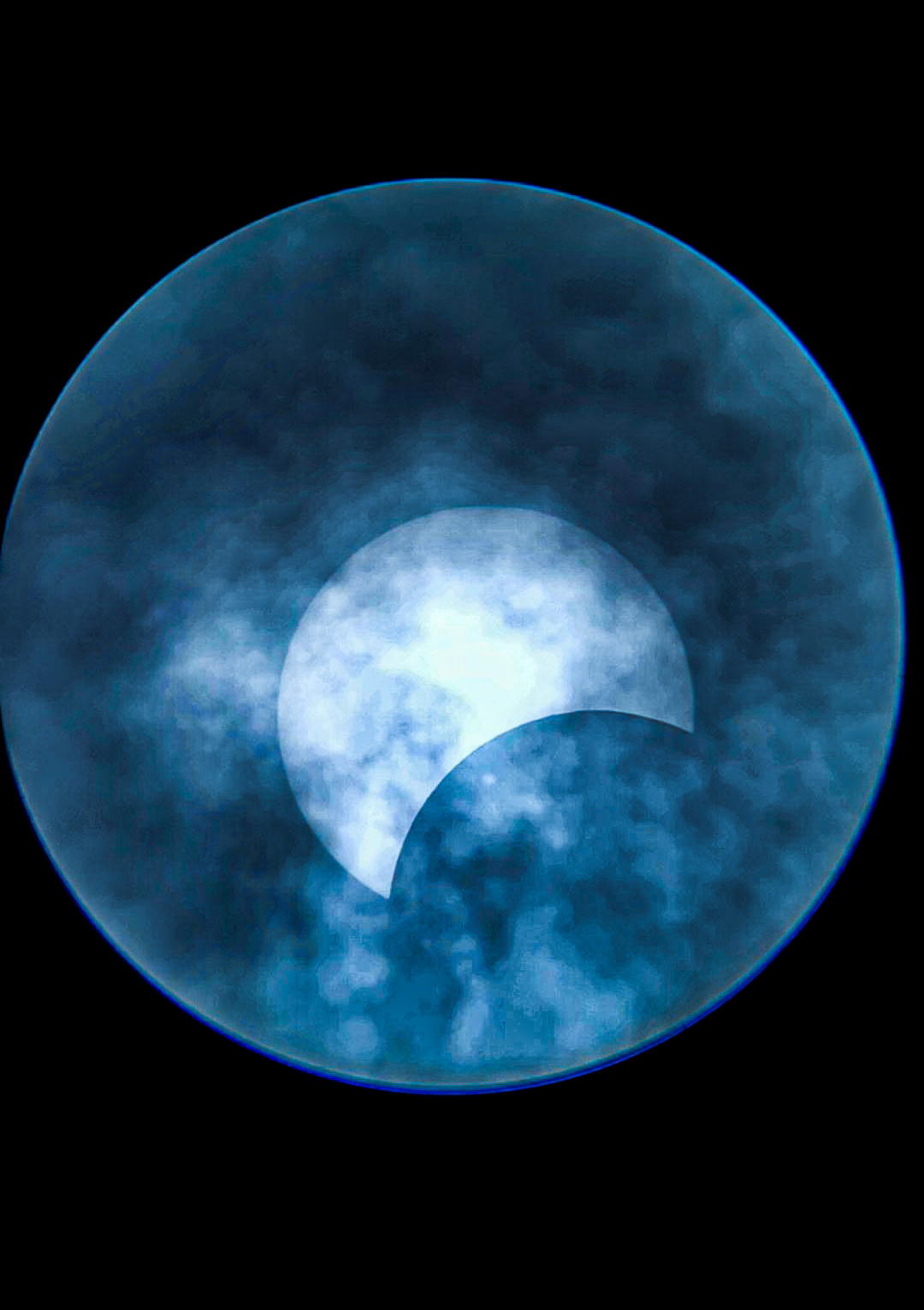
Telescopic view from Chennai, India

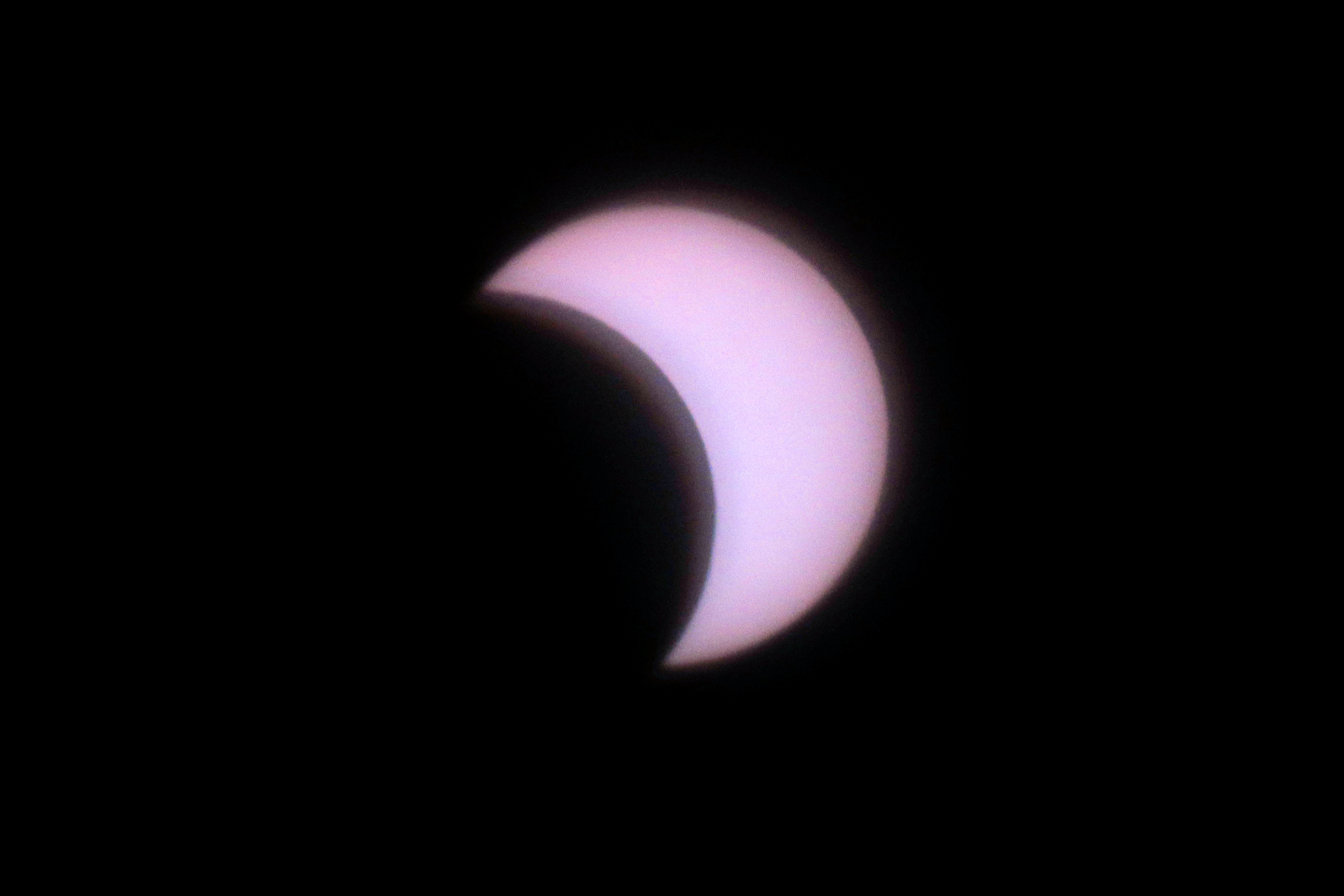
Partial from Beijing, China, 7:51 UTC

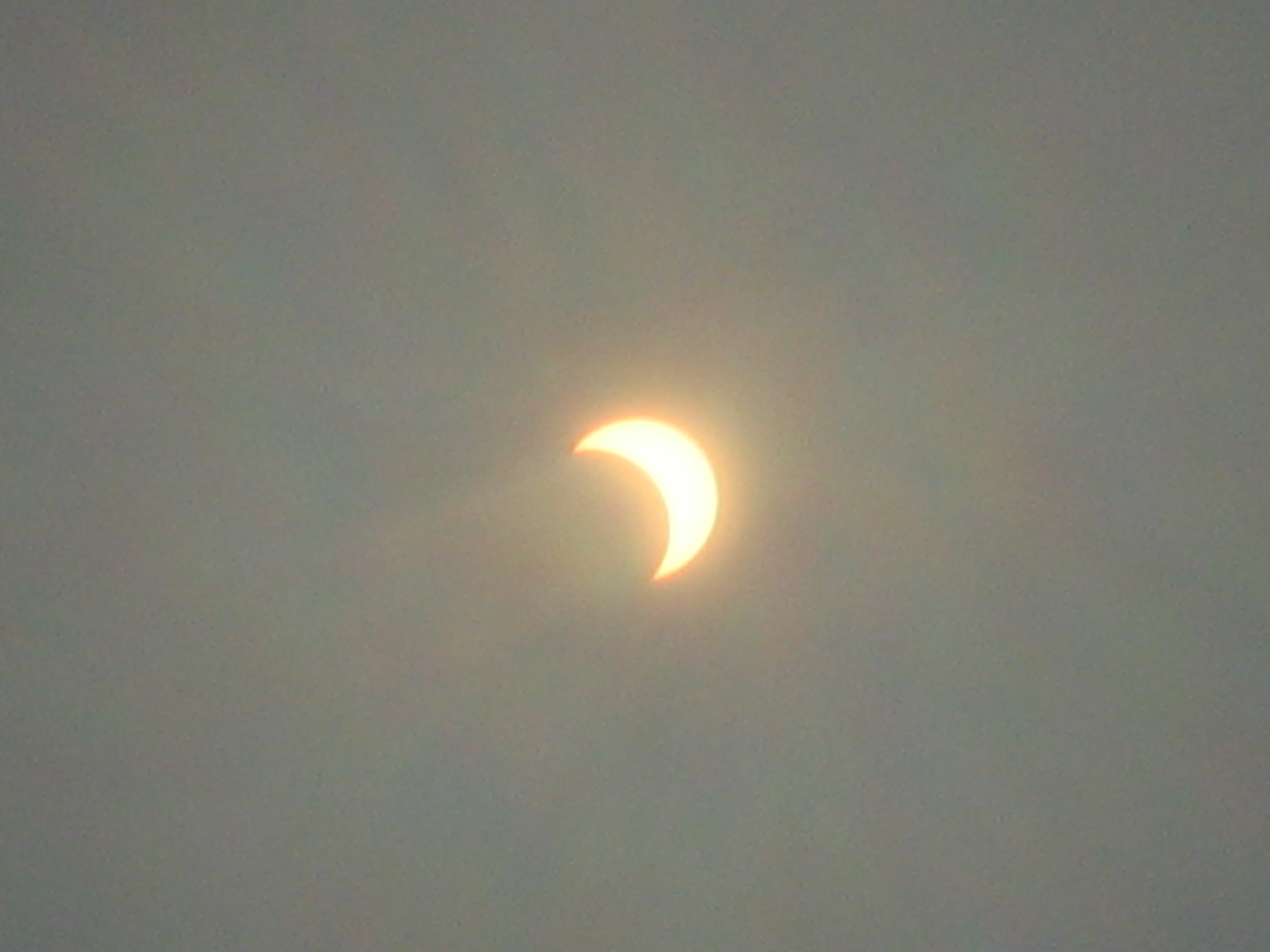
Partial from Jinan, China, 7:56 UTC

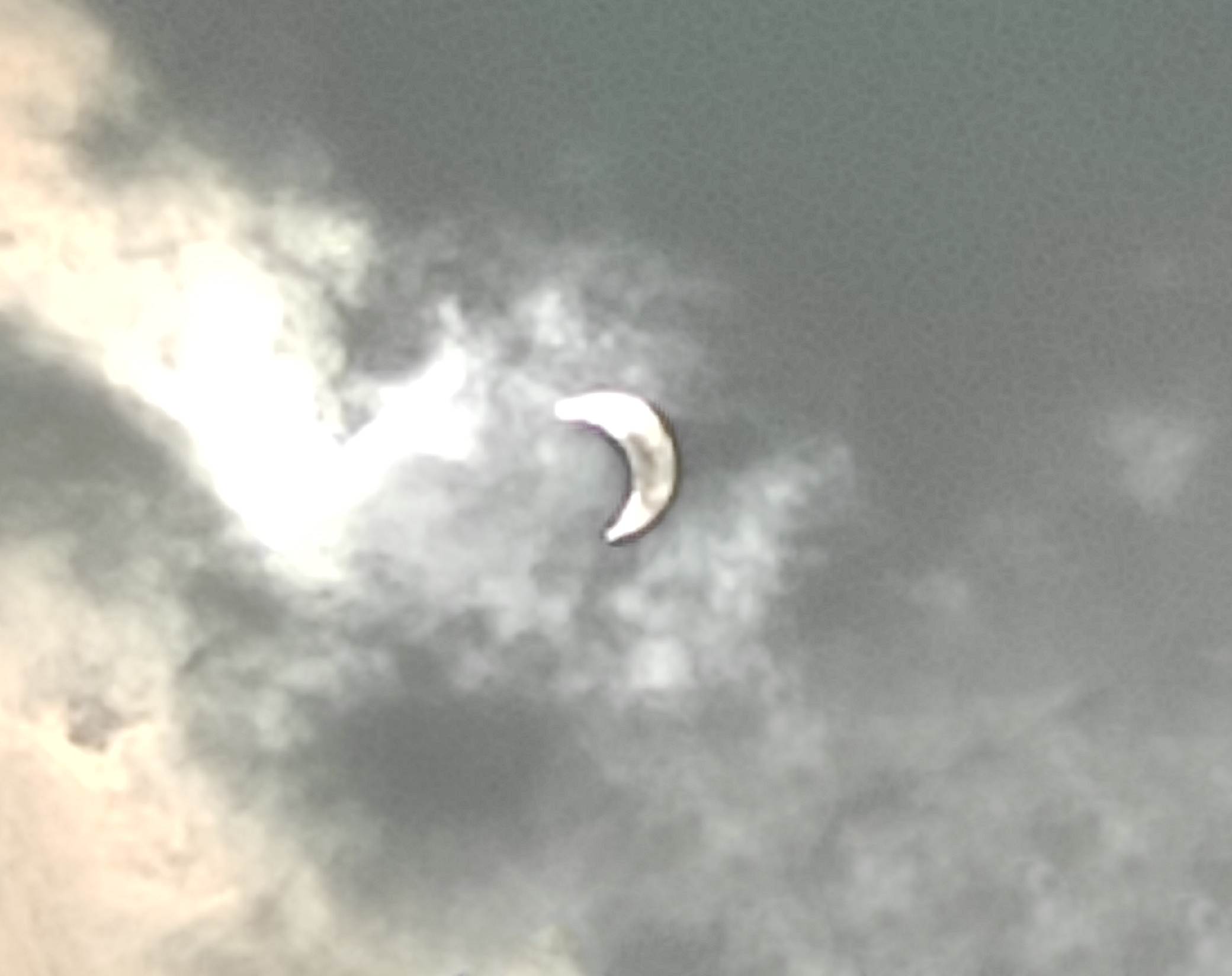
Partial from Tai'an, China, 7:57 UTC

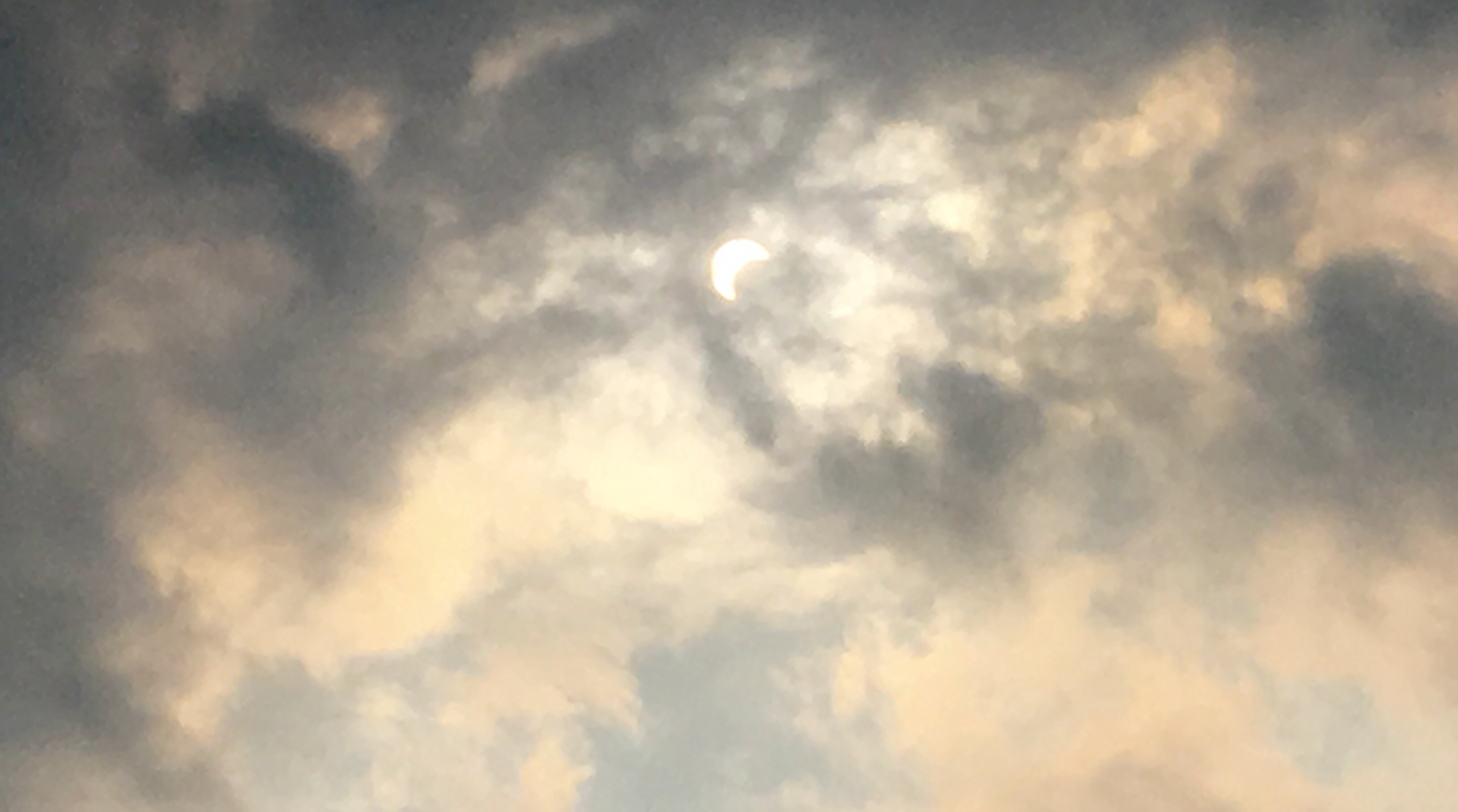
Partial from Gandara, Samar, Philippines, 8:01 UTC

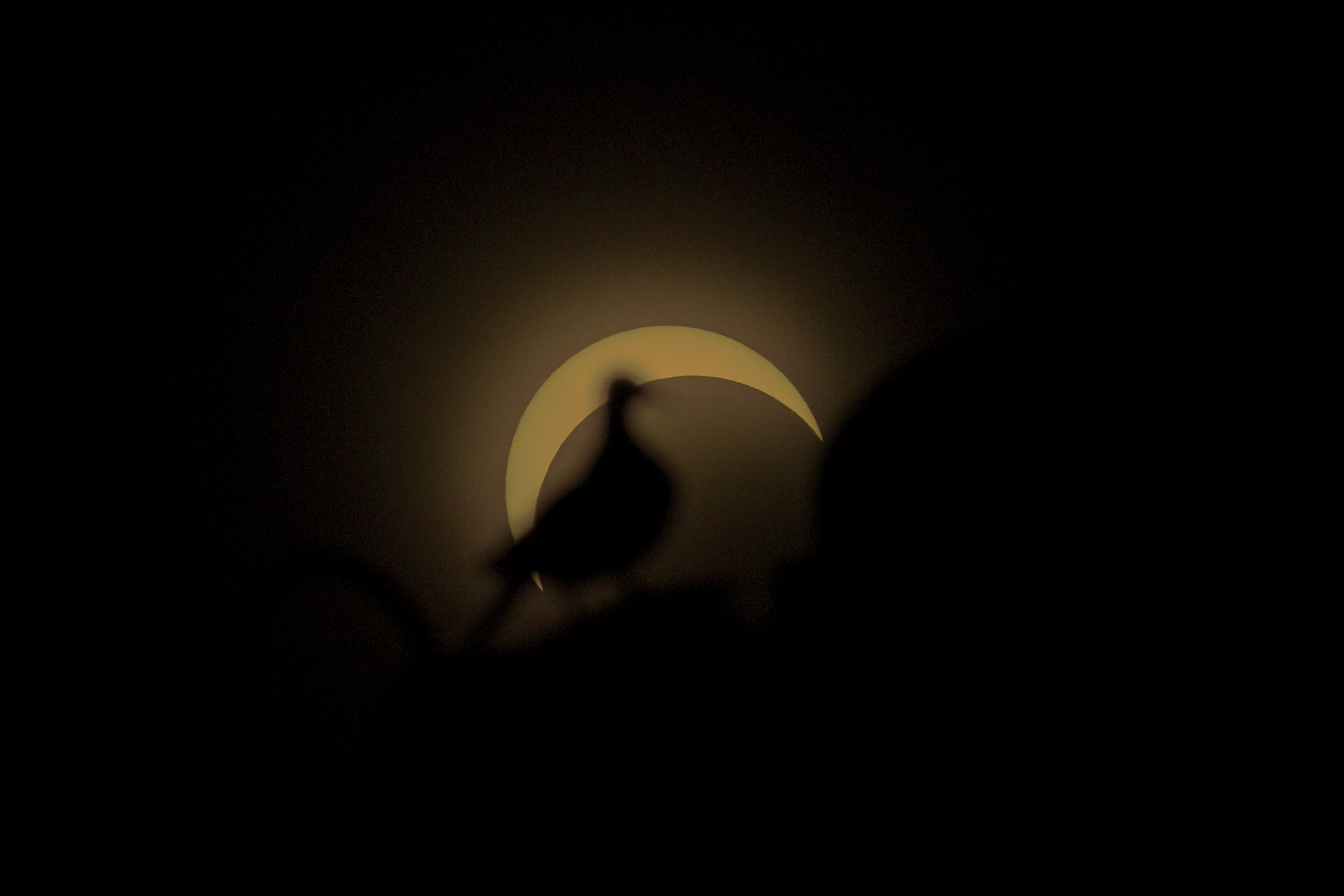
Partial from Kaohsiung, Taiwan, 8:05 UTC

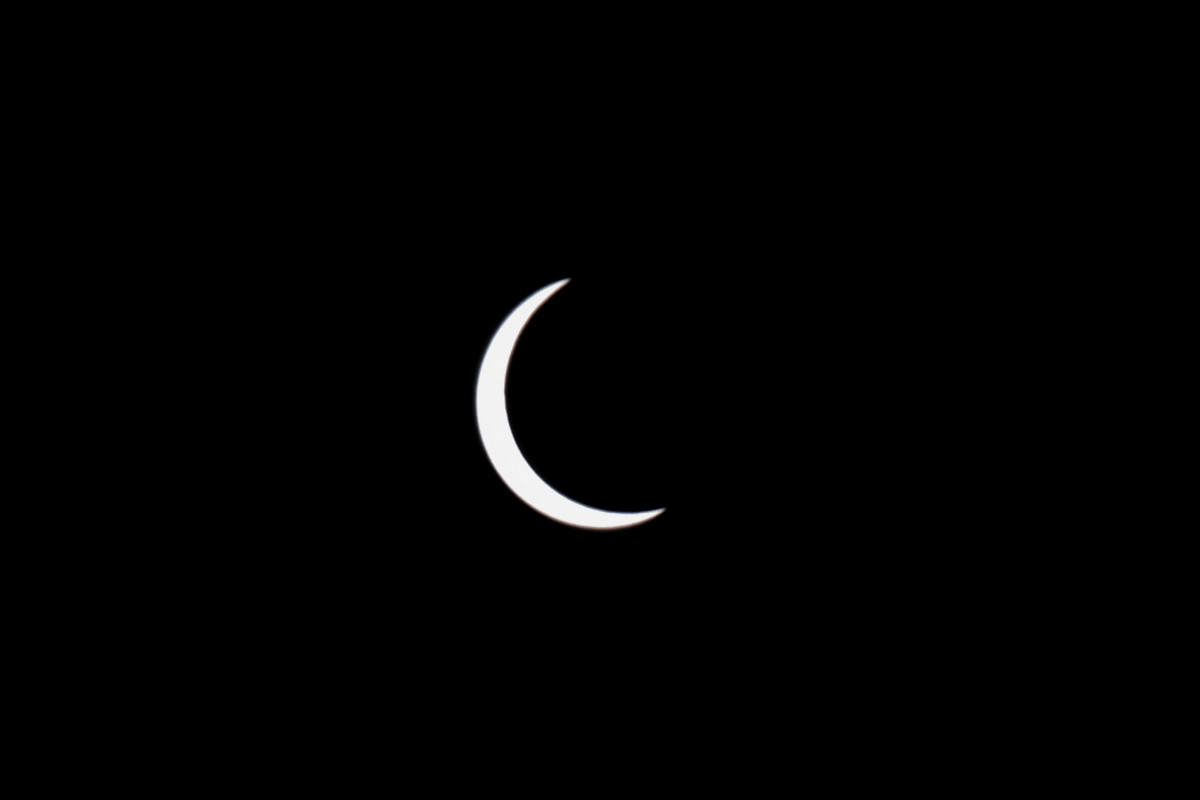
Partial from Yau Tong, Hong Kong, 8:08 UTC

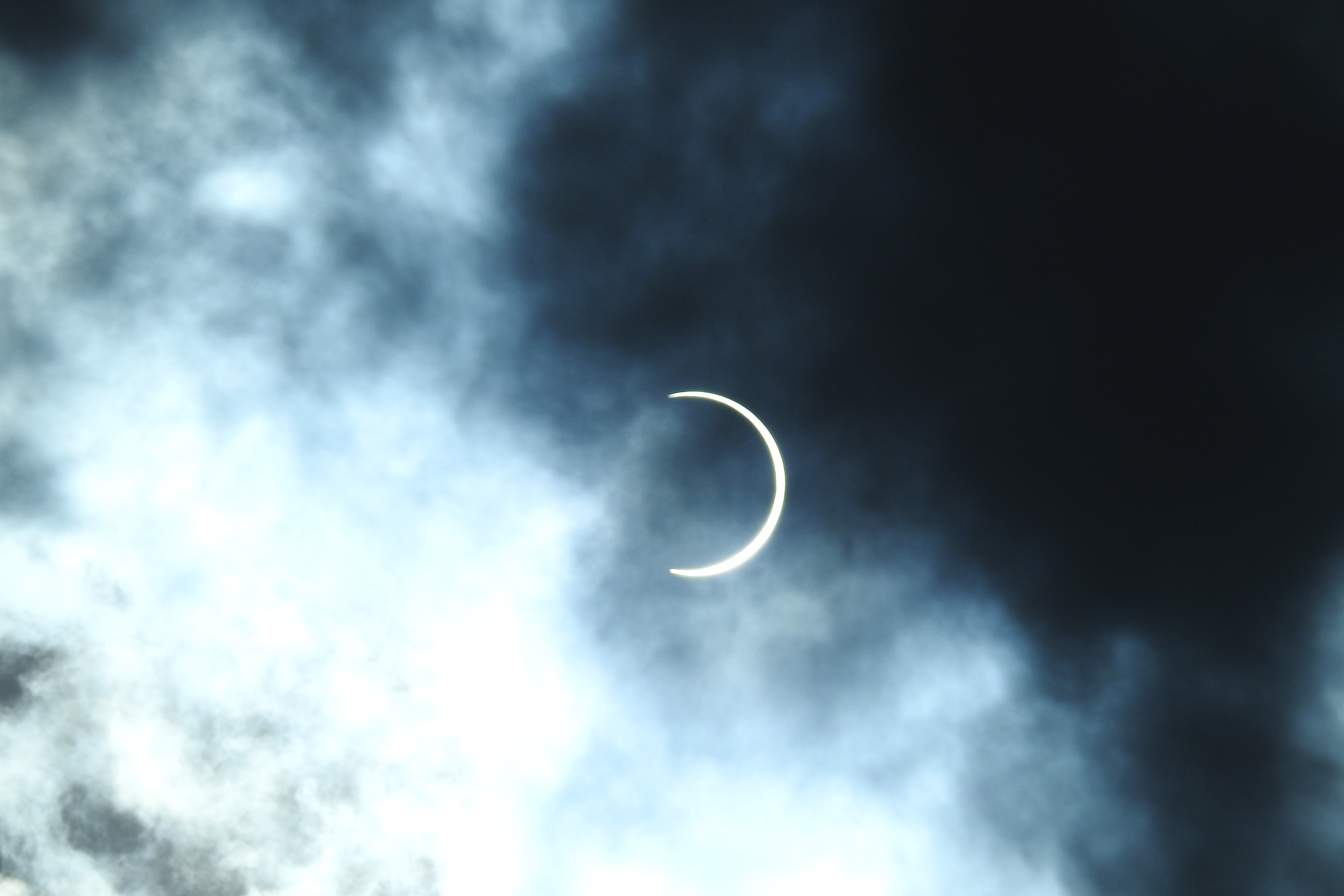
Partial from Taichung, Taiwan, 8:09 UTC

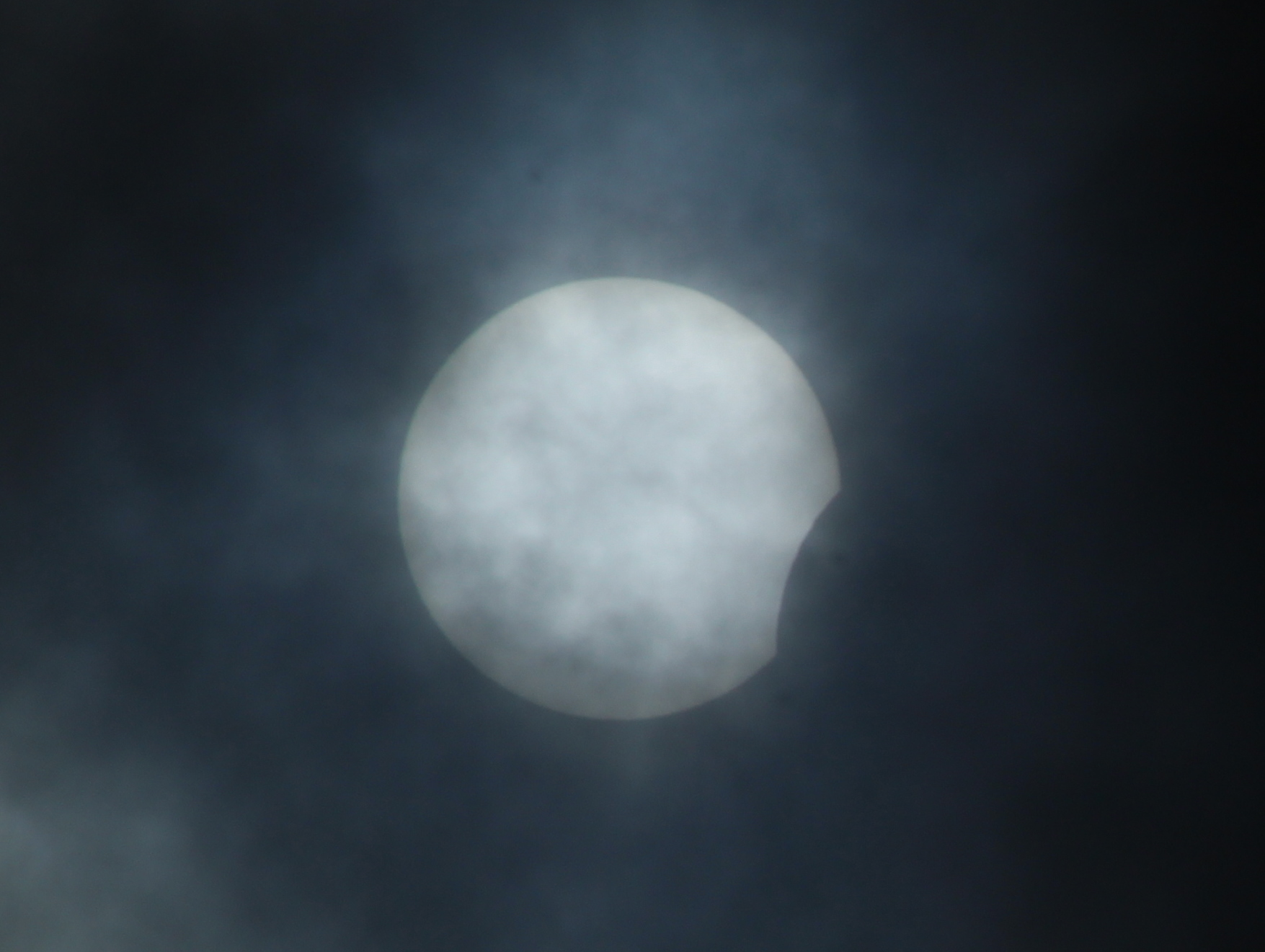
Partial from Pangkalpinang, Indonesia, 8:10 UTC

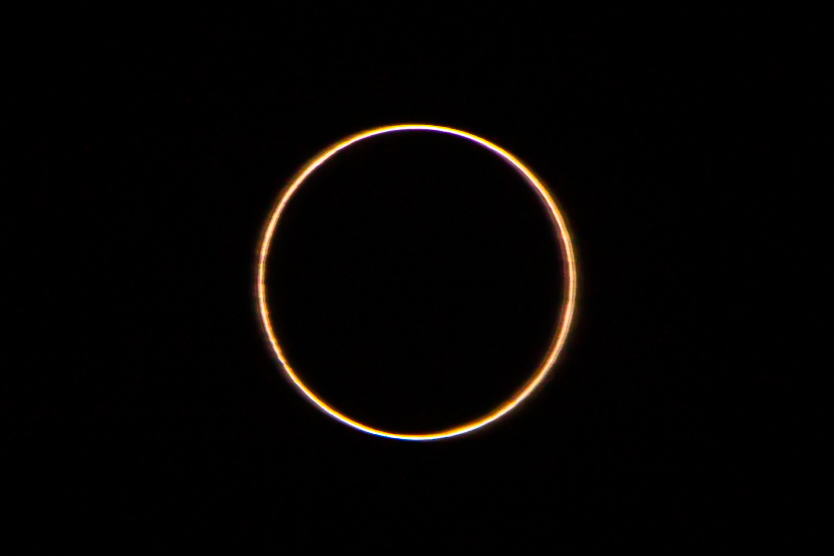
Xiamen, China, 8:11 UTC

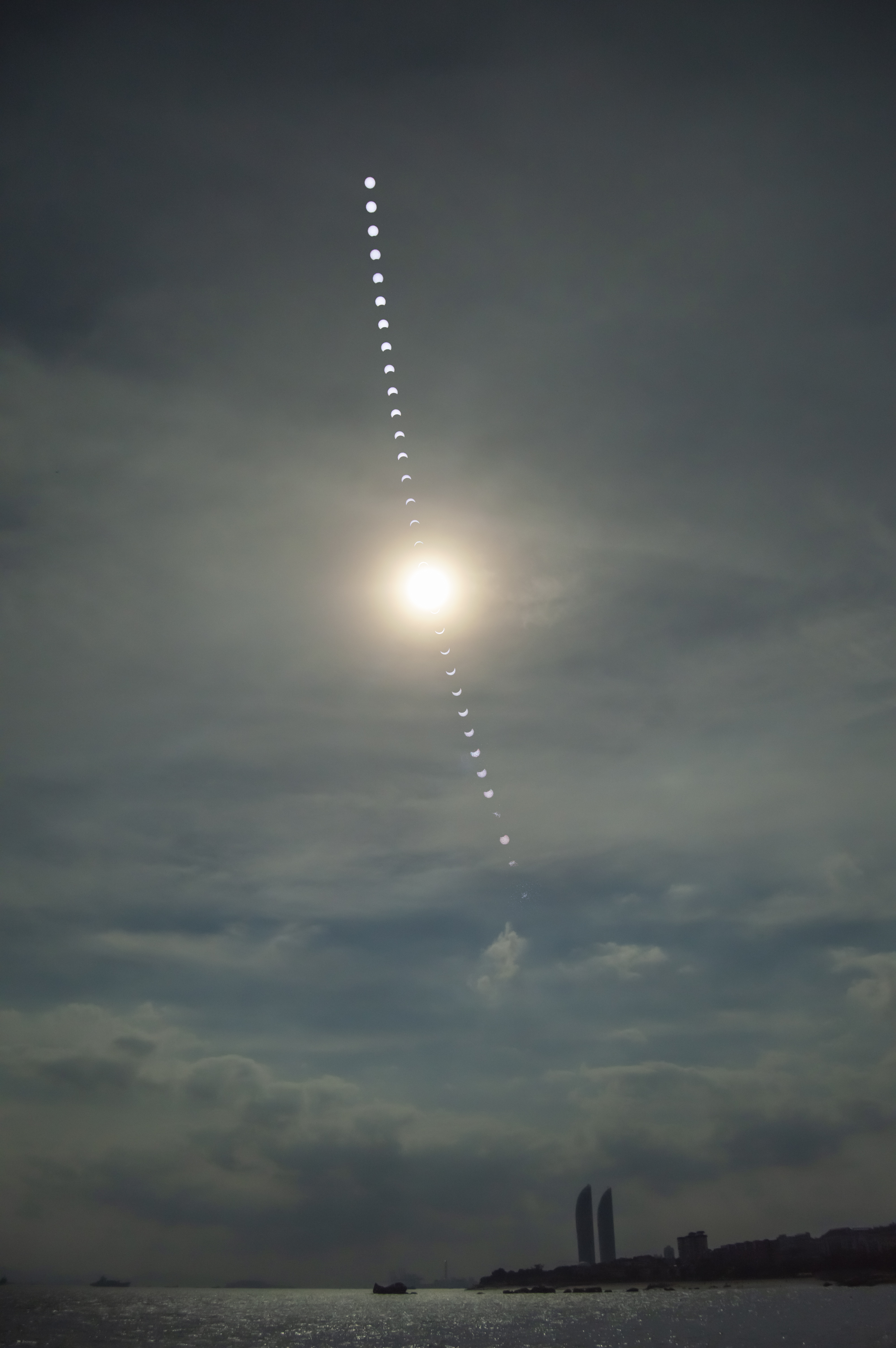
Time-lapse image of the eclipse in Xiamen, China

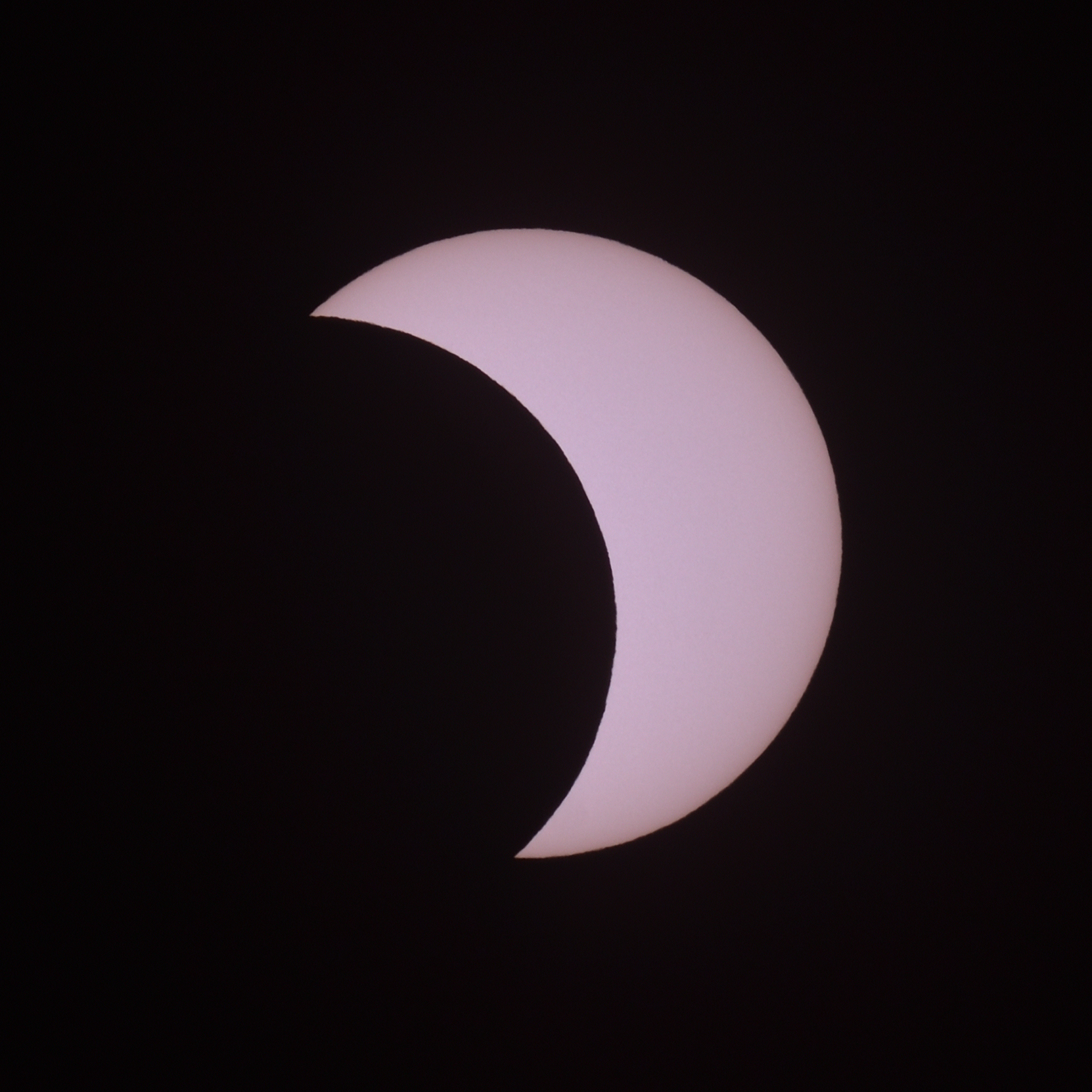
Partial from Fukuoka, Japan, 8:12 UTC

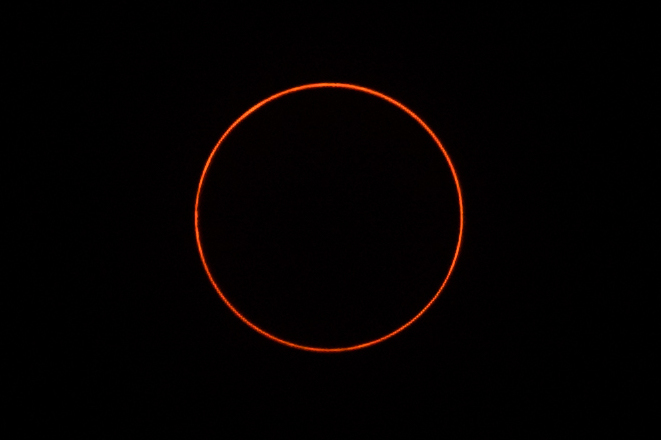
Chiayi, Taiwan, 8:13 UTC

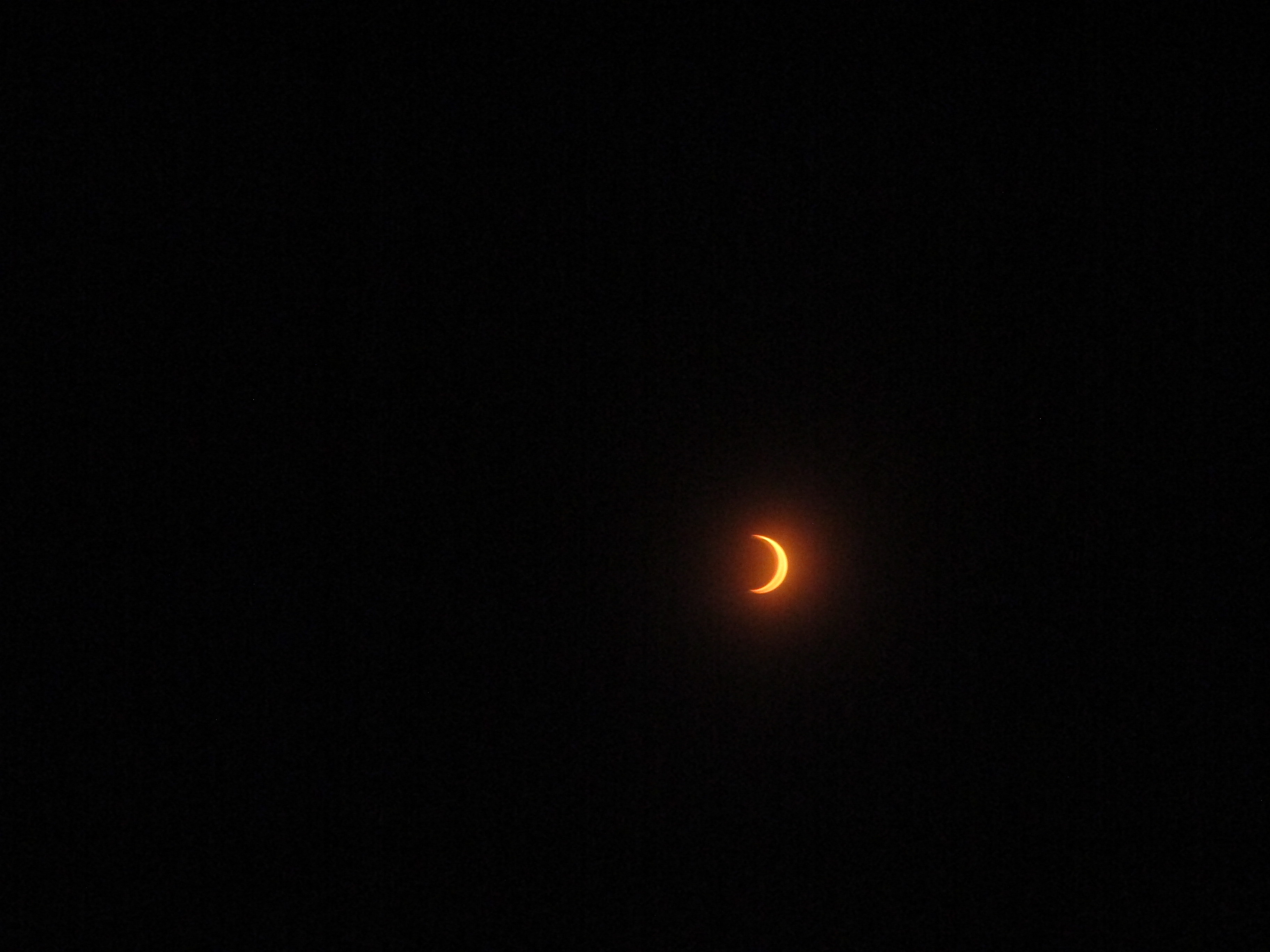
Partial from Hsinchu, Taiwan, 8:18 UTC

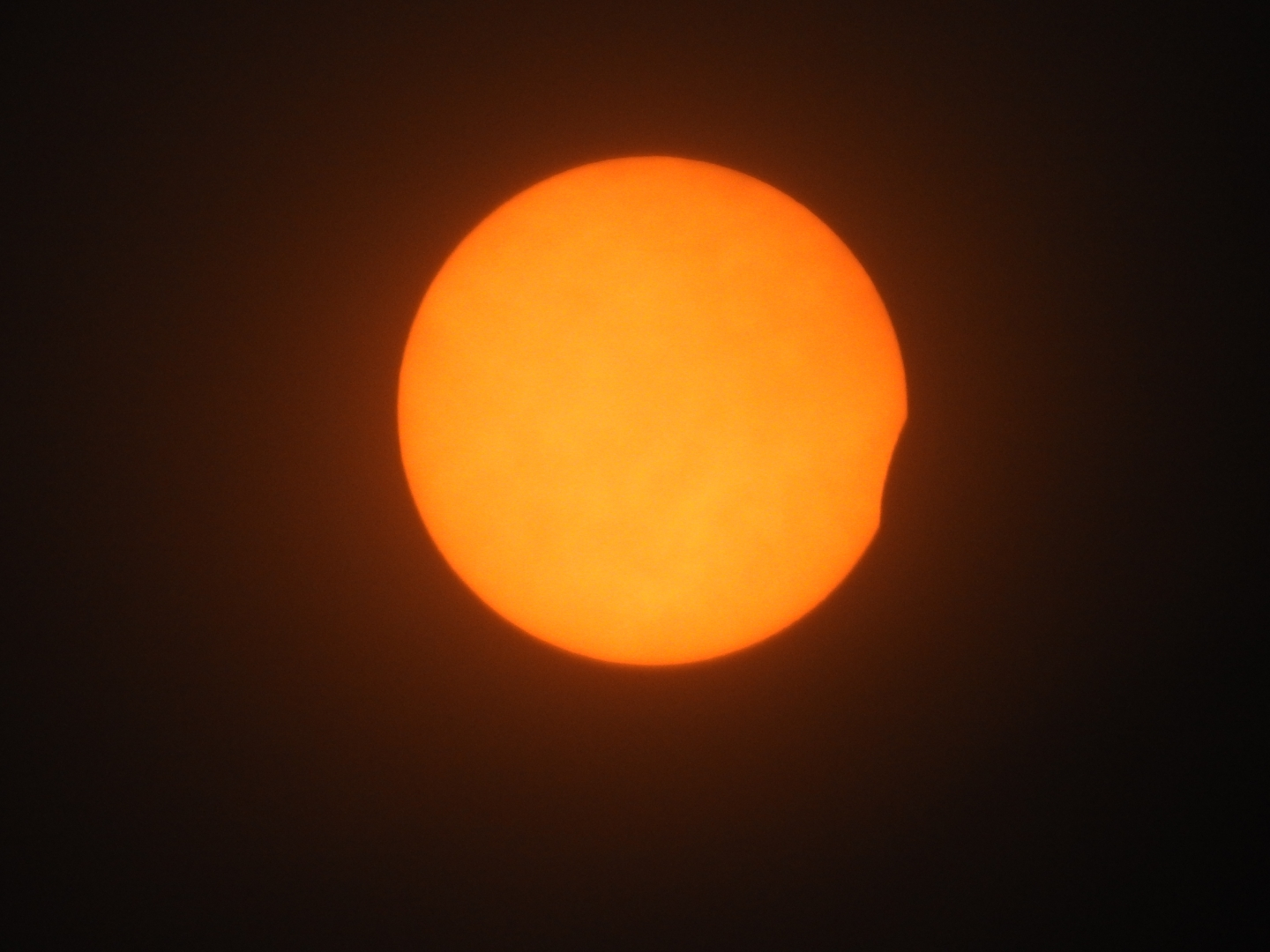
Partial from Surabaya, Indonesia, 8:22 UTC

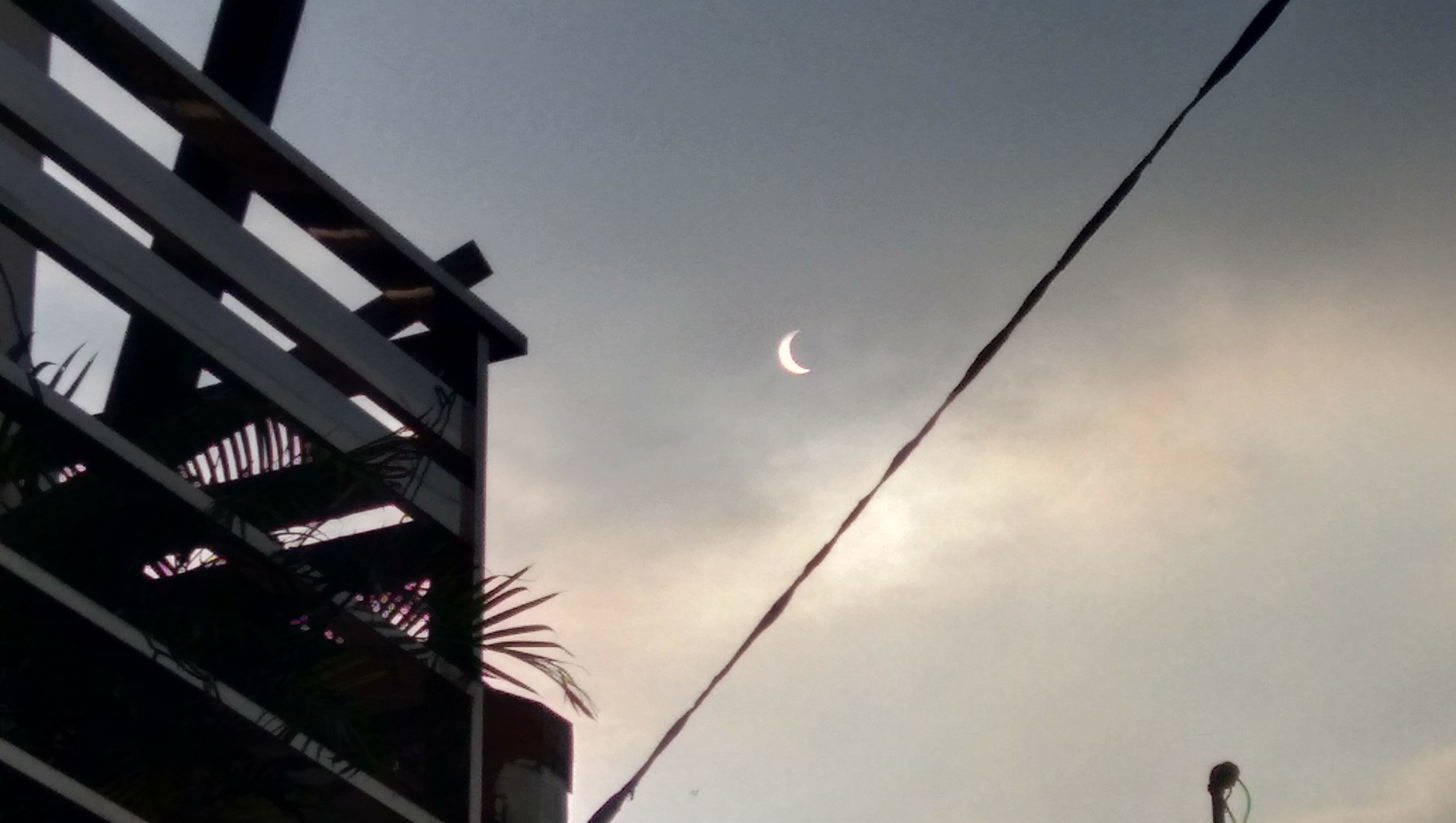
Partial from San Jose del Monte, Philippines, 8:23 UTC

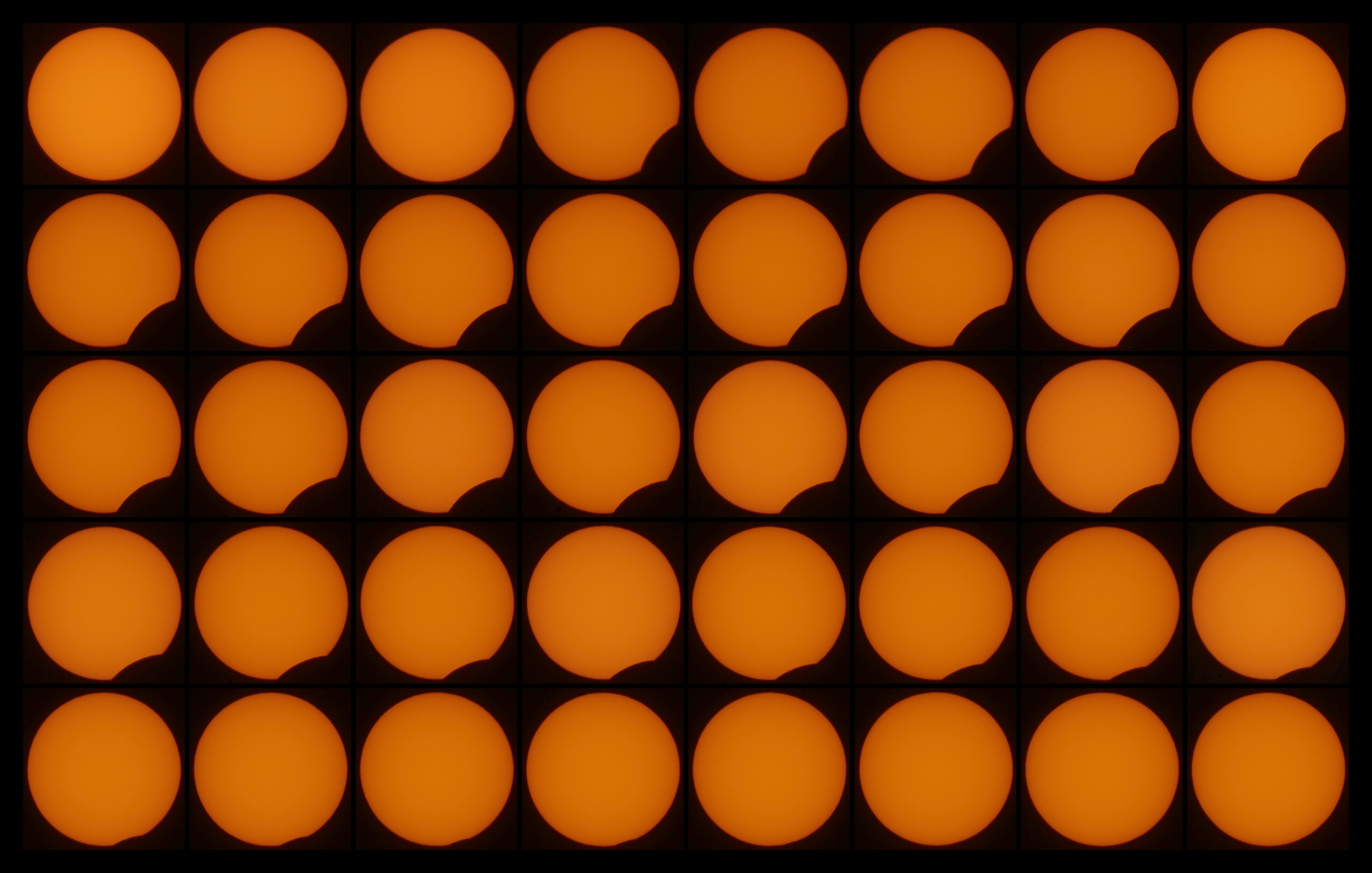
Eclipse progression from Oria, Italy

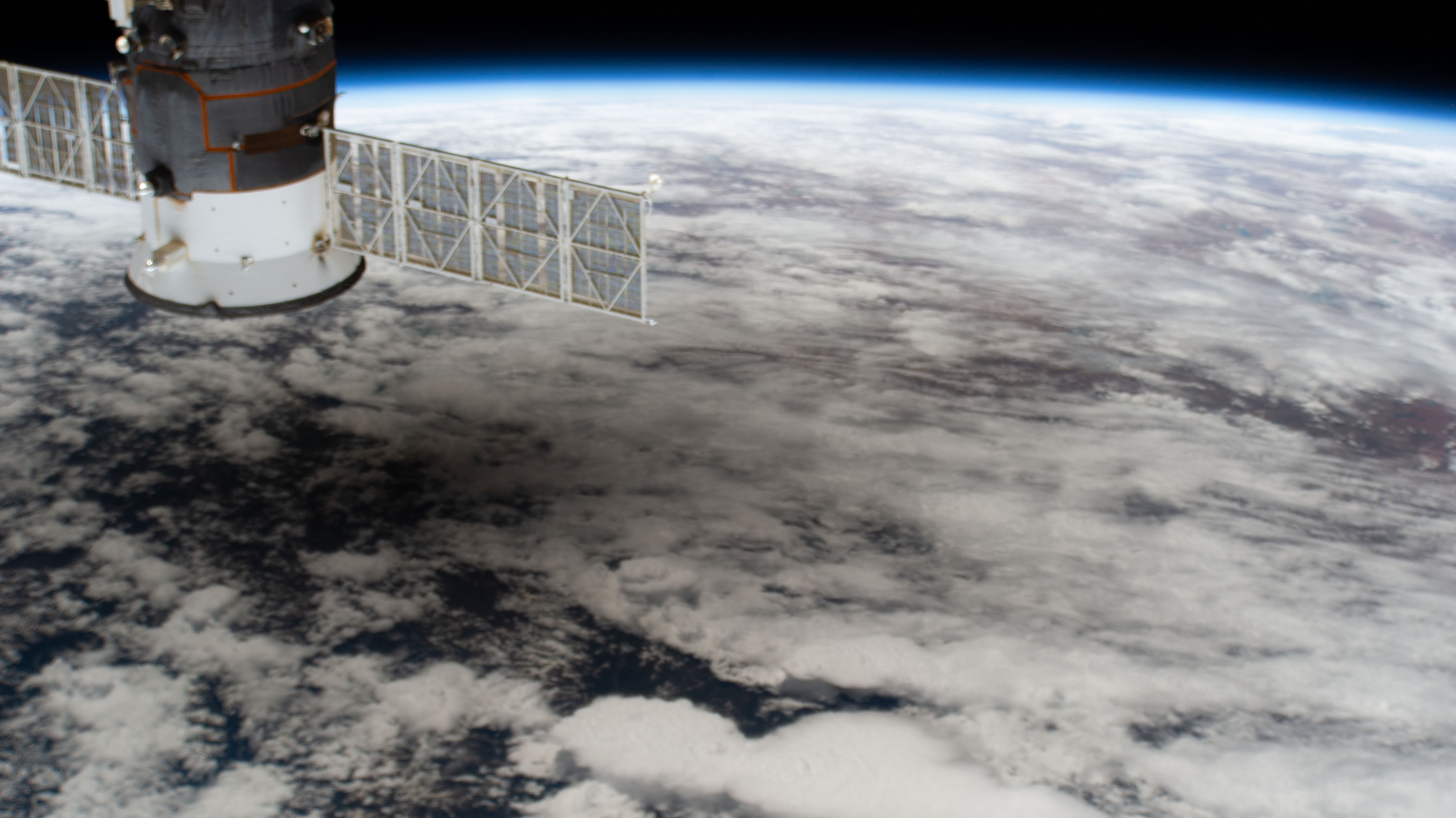
The Moon's antumbra, as seen from the ISS

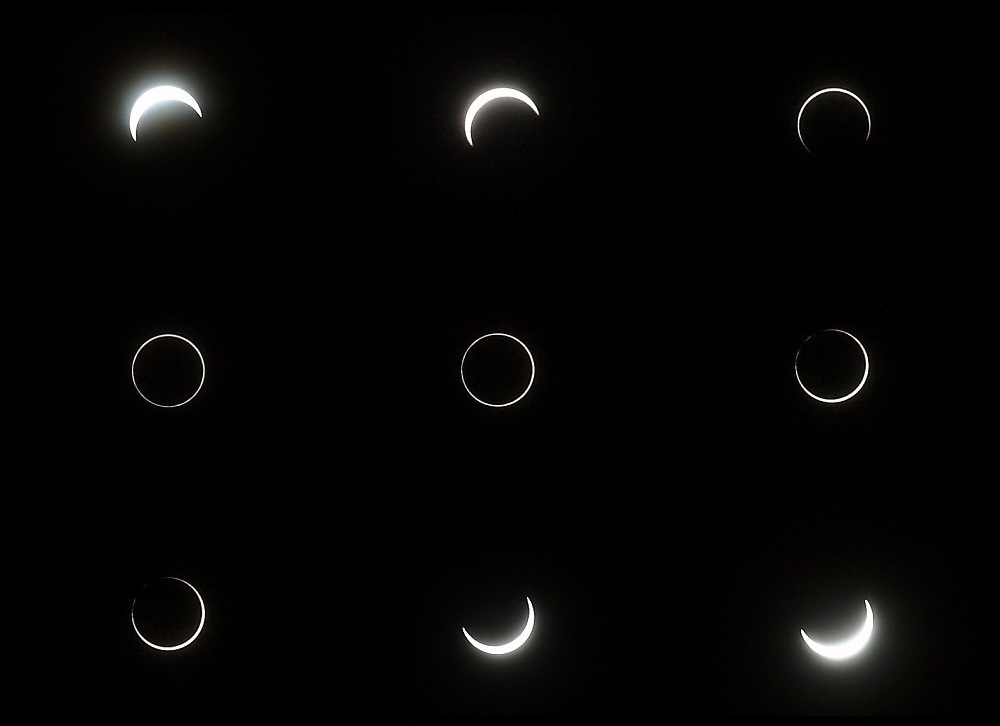
Eclipse progression at the annular stage, seen from Minxiong, Chiayi County, Taiwan

== Eclipse details ==
Shown below are two tables displaying details about this particular solar eclipse. The first table outlines times at which the Moon's penumbra or umbra attains the specific parameter, and the second table describes various other parameters pertaining to this eclipse.

June 21, 2020 Solar Eclipse Times
Event	Time (UTC)
First Penumbral External Contact	2020 June 21 at 03:47:09.9 UTC
First Umbral External Contact	2020 June 21 at 04:48:54.2 UTC
First Central Line	2020 June 21 at 04:49:37.4 UTC
Greatest Duration	2020 June 21 at 04:49:37.4 UTC
First Umbral Internal Contact	2020 June 21 at 04:50:20.7 UTC
First Penumbral Internal Contact	2020 June 21 at 05:52:48.7 UTC
Greatest Eclipse	2020 June 21 at 06:41:15.4 UTC
Equatorial Conjunction	2020 June 21 at 06:42:34.5 UTC
Ecliptic Conjunction	2020 June 21 at 06:42:36.6 UTC
Last Penumbral Internal Contact	2020 June 21 at 07:29:41.2 UTC
Last Umbral Internal Contact	2020 June 21 at 08:32:11.3 UTC
Last Central Line	2020 June 21 at 08:32:51.7 UTC
Last Umbral External Contact	2020 June 21 at 08:33:32.0 UTC
Last Penumbral External Contact	2020 June 21 at 09:35:13.9 UTC

June 21, 2020 Solar Eclipse Parameters
Parameter	Value
Eclipse Magnitude	0.99401
Eclipse Obscuration	0.98806
Gamma	0.12090
Sun Right Ascension	06h01m33.0s
Sun Declination	+23°26'09.7"
Sun Semi-Diameter	15'44.2"
Sun Equatorial Horizontal Parallax	08.7"
Moon Right Ascension	06h01m30.2s
Moon Declination	+23°32'56.7"
Moon Semi-Diameter	15'24.0"
Moon Equatorial Horizontal Parallax	0°56'31.1"
ΔT	70.0 s

== Eclipse season ==
This eclipse is part of an eclipse season, a period, roughly every six months, when eclipses occur. Only two (or occasionally three) eclipse seasons occur each year, and each season lasts about 35 days and repeats just short of six months (173 days) later; thus two full eclipse seasons always occur each year. Either two or three eclipses happen each eclipse season. In the sequence below, each eclipse is separated by a fortnight. The first and last eclipse in this sequence is separated by one synodic month.

Eclipse season of June–July 2020
June 5 Descending node (full moon)	June 21 Ascending node (new moon)	July 5 Descending node (full moon)
Penumbral lunar eclipse Lunar Saros 111	Annular solar eclipse Solar Saros 137	Penumbral lunar eclipse Lunar Saros 149

== Related eclipses ==
=== Eclipses in 2020 ===
- A penumbral lunar eclipse on January 10.
- A penumbral lunar eclipse on June 5.
- An annular solar eclipse on June 21.
- A penumbral lunar eclipse on July 5.
- A penumbral lunar eclipse on November 30.
- A total solar eclipse on December 14.

=== Metonic ===
- Preceded by: Solar eclipse of September 1, 2016
- Followed by: Solar eclipse of April 8, 2024

=== Tzolkinex ===
- Preceded by: Solar eclipse of May 10, 2013
- Followed by: Solar eclipse of August 2, 2027

=== Half-Saros ===
- Preceded by: Lunar eclipse of June 15, 2011
- Followed by: Lunar eclipse of June 26, 2029

=== Tritos ===
- Preceded by: Solar eclipse of July 22, 2009
- Followed by: Solar eclipse of May 21, 2031

=== Solar Saros 137 ===
- Preceded by: Solar eclipse of June 10, 2002
- Followed by: Solar eclipse of July 2, 2038

=== Inex ===
- Preceded by: Solar eclipse of July 11, 1991
- Followed by: Solar eclipse of May 31, 2049

=== Triad ===
- Preceded by: Solar eclipse of August 21, 1933
- Followed by: Solar eclipse of April 23, 2107

=== Solar eclipses of 2018–2021 ===
This eclipse is a member of a semester series. An eclipse in a semester series of solar eclipses repeats approximately every 177 days and 4 hours (a semester) at alternating nodes of the Moon's orbit.

The partial solar eclipses on February 15, 2018 and August 11, 2018 occur in the previous lunar year eclipse set.

Solar eclipse series sets from 2018 to 2021
Ascending node			Descending node		
Saros	Map	Gamma	Saros	Map	Gamma
117 Partial in Melbourne, Australia	July 13, 2018 Partial	−1.35423	122 Partial in Nakhodka, Russia	January 6, 2019 Partial	1.14174
127 Totality in La Serena, Chile	July 2, 2019 Total	−0.64656	132 Annularity in Jaffna, Sri Lanka	December 26, 2019 Annular	0.41351
137 Annularity in Beigang, Yunlin, Taiwan	June 21, 2020 Annular	0.12090	142 Totality in Gorbea, Chile	December 14, 2020 Total	−0.29394
147 Partial in Halifax, Canada	June 10, 2021 Annular	0.91516	152 From HMS Protector off South Georgia	December 4, 2021 Total	−0.95261

=== Saros 137 ===
This eclipse is a part of Saros series 137, repeating every 18 years, 11 days, and containing 70 events. The series started with a partial solar eclipse on May 25, 1389. It contains total eclipses from August 20, 1533 through December 6, 1695; the first set of hybrid eclipses from December 17, 1713 through February 11, 1804; the first set of annular eclipses from February 21, 1822 through March 25, 1876; the second set of hybrid eclipses from April 6, 1894 through April 28, 1930; and the second set of annular eclipses from May 9, 1948 through April 13, 2507. The series ends at member 70 as a partial eclipse on June 28, 2633. Its eclipses are tabulated in three columns; every third eclipse in the same column is one exeligmos apart, so they all cast shadows over approximately the same parts of the Earth.

The longest duration of totality was produced by member 11 at 2 minutes, 55 seconds on September 10, 1569, and the longest duration of annularity will be produced by member 59 at 7 minutes, 5 seconds on February 28, 2435. All eclipses in this series occur at the Moon’s ascending node of orbit.

Series members 24–46 occur between 1801 and 2200:
24	25	26
February 11, 1804	February 21, 1822	March 4, 1840
27	28	29
March 15, 1858	March 25, 1876	April 6, 1894
30	31	32
April 17, 1912	April 28, 1930	May 9, 1948
33	34	35
May 20, 1966	May 30, 1984	June 10, 2002
36	37	38
June 21, 2020	July 2, 2038	July 12, 2056
39	40	41
July 24, 2074	August 3, 2092	August 15, 2110
42	43	44
August 25, 2128	September 6, 2146	September 16, 2164
45	46	
September 27, 2182	October 9, 2200	

=== Metonic series ===
The metonic series repeats eclipses every 19 years (6939.69 days), lasting about 5 cycles. Eclipses occur in nearly the same calendar date. In addition, the octon subseries repeats 1/5 of that or every 3.8 years (1387.94 days). All eclipses in this table occur at the Moon's ascending node.

21 eclipse events between June 21, 1982 and June 21, 2058
June 21	April 8–9	January 26	November 13–14	September 1–2
117	119	121	123	125
June 21, 1982	April 9, 1986	January 26, 1990	November 13, 1993	September 2, 1997
127	129	131	133	135
June 21, 2001	April 8, 2005	January 26, 2009	November 13, 2012	September 1, 2016
137	139	141	143	145
June 21, 2020	April 8, 2024	January 26, 2028	November 14, 2031	September 2, 2035
147	149	151	153	155
June 21, 2039	April 9, 2043	January 26, 2047	November 14, 2050	September 2, 2054
157
June 21, 2058

=== Tritos series ===
This eclipse is a part of a tritos cycle, repeating at alternating nodes every 135 synodic months (≈ 3986.63 days, or 11 years minus 1 month). Their appearance and longitude are irregular due to a lack of synchronization with the anomalistic month (period of perigee), but groupings of 3 tritos cycles (≈ 33 years minus 3 months) come close (≈ 434.044 anomalistic months), so eclipses are similar in these groupings.

Series members between 1801 and 2200
March 4, 1802 (Saros 117)	February 1, 1813 (Saros 118)	January 1, 1824 (Saros 119)	November 30, 1834 (Saros 120)	October 30, 1845 (Saros 121)
September 29, 1856 (Saros 122)	August 29, 1867 (Saros 123)	July 29, 1878 (Saros 124)	June 28, 1889 (Saros 125)	May 28, 1900 (Saros 126)
April 28, 1911 (Saros 127)	March 28, 1922 (Saros 128)	February 24, 1933 (Saros 129)	January 25, 1944 (Saros 130)	December 25, 1954 (Saros 131)
November 23, 1965 (Saros 132)	October 23, 1976 (Saros 133)	September 23, 1987 (Saros 134)	August 22, 1998 (Saros 135)	July 22, 2009 (Saros 136)
June 21, 2020 (Saros 137)	May 21, 2031 (Saros 138)	April 20, 2042 (Saros 139)	March 20, 2053 (Saros 140)	February 17, 2064 (Saros 141)
January 16, 2075 (Saros 142)	December 16, 2085 (Saros 143)	November 15, 2096 (Saros 144)	October 16, 2107 (Saros 145)	September 15, 2118 (Saros 146)
August 15, 2129 (Saros 147)	July 14, 2140 (Saros 148)	June 14, 2151 (Saros 149)	May 14, 2162 (Saros 150)	April 12, 2173 (Saros 151)
March 12, 2184 (Saros 152)	February 10, 2195 (Saros 153)			

=== Inex series ===
This eclipse is a part of the long period inex cycle, repeating at alternating nodes, every 358 synodic months (≈ 10,571.95 days, or 29 years minus 20 days). Their appearance and longitude are irregular due to a lack of synchronization with the anomalistic month (period of perigee). However, groupings of 3 inex cycles (≈ 87 years minus 2 months) comes close (≈ 1,151.02 anomalistic months), so eclipses are similar in these groupings.

Series members between 1801 and 2200
November 9, 1817 (Saros 130)	October 20, 1846 (Saros 131)	September 29, 1875 (Saros 132)
September 9, 1904 (Saros 133)	August 21, 1933 (Saros 134)	July 31, 1962 (Saros 135)
July 11, 1991 (Saros 136)	June 21, 2020 (Saros 137)	May 31, 2049 (Saros 138)
May 11, 2078 (Saros 139)	April 23, 2107 (Saros 140)	April 1, 2136 (Saros 141)
March 12, 2165 (Saros 142)	February 21, 2194 (Saros 143)	
