= 2018 lunar eclipse =

There are two total lunar eclipses occurring in 2018:

- January 2018 lunar eclipse
- July 2018 lunar eclipse
