= April 1931 lunar eclipse =

Total lunar eclipse of April 1931

- Total eclipse
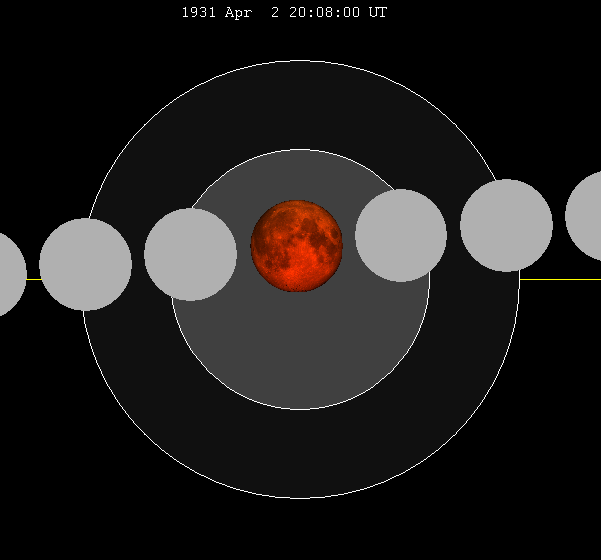
- The Moon's hourly motion shown right to left
- Date: April 2, 1931
- Gamma: 0.2043
- Magnitude: 1.5021
- Saros cycle: 121 (51 of 84)
- Totality: 89 minutes, 36 seconds
- Partiality: 207 minutes, 50 seconds
- Penumbral: 317 minutes, 56 seconds
Contacts (UTC)
- P1: 17:28:34
- U1: 18:23:35
- U2: 19:22:43
- Greatest: 20:07:31
- U3: 20:52:19
- U4: 21:51:25
- P4: 22:46:30

A total lunar eclipse occurred at the Moon’s descending node of orbit on Thursday, April 2, 1931, with an umbral magnitude of 1.5021. It was a central lunar eclipse, in which part of the Moon passed through the center of the Earth's shadow. A lunar eclipse occurs when the Moon moves into the Earth's shadow, causing the Moon to be darkened. A total lunar eclipse occurs when the Moon's near side entirely passes into the Earth's umbral shadow. Unlike a solar eclipse, which can only be viewed from a relatively small area of the world, a lunar eclipse may be viewed from anywhere on the night side of Earth. A total lunar eclipse can last up to nearly two hours, while a total solar eclipse lasts only a few minutes at any given place, because the Moon's shadow is smaller. Occurring only about 24 hours after perigee (on April 1, 1931, at 22:05 UTC), the Moon's apparent diameter was larger.

== Visibility ==
The eclipse was completely visible over central and east Africa, eastern Europe, and much of Asia, seen rising over west Africa, western Europe, and much of South America and setting over east and northeast Asia and Australia.

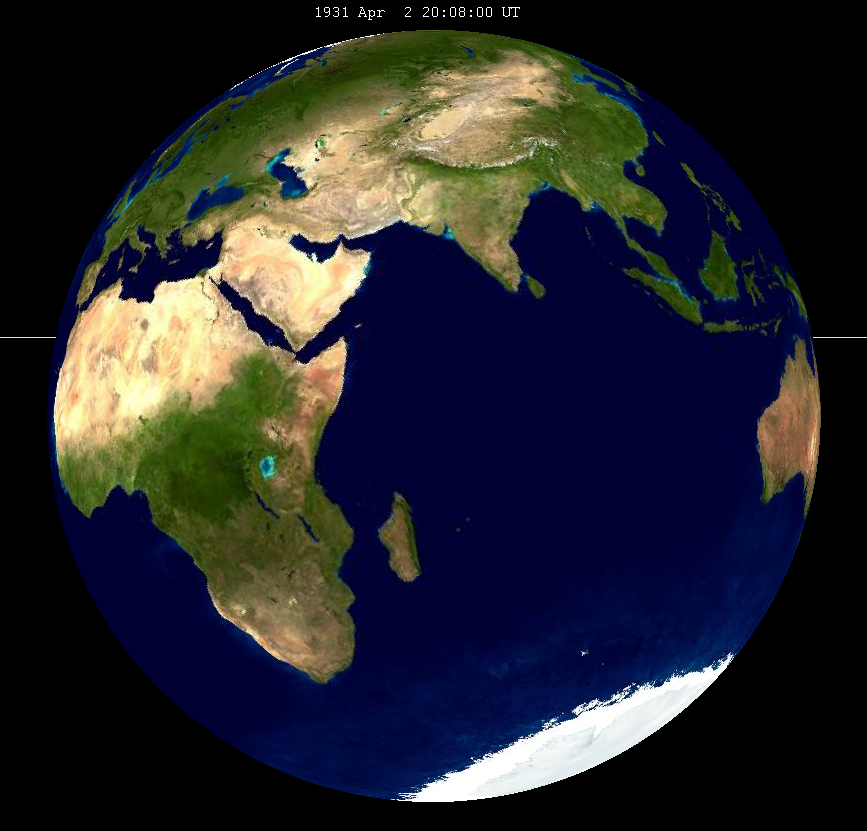
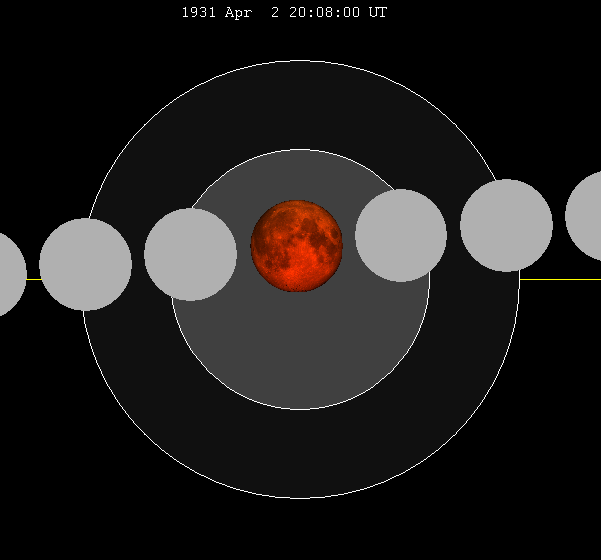

== Eclipse details ==
Shown below is a table displaying details about this particular solar eclipse. It describes various parameters pertaining to this eclipse.

April 2, 1931 Lunar Eclipse Parameters
Parameter	Value
Penumbral Magnitude	2.46366
Umbral Magnitude	1.50213
Gamma	0.20432
Sun Right Ascension	00h44m34.7s
Sun Declination	+04°47'34.2"
Sun Semi-Diameter	15'59.8"
Sun Equatorial Horizontal Parallax	08.8"
Moon Right Ascension	12h44m58.7s
Moon Declination	-04°36'37.3"
Moon Semi-Diameter	16'38.2"
Moon Equatorial Horizontal Parallax	1°01'03.6"
ΔT	24.0 s

== Eclipse season ==
This eclipse is part of an eclipse season, a period, roughly every six months, when eclipses occur. Only two (or occasionally three) eclipse seasons occur each year, and each season lasts about 35 days and repeats just short of six months (173 days) later; thus two full eclipse seasons always occur each year. Either two or three eclipses happen each eclipse season. In the sequence below, each eclipse is separated by a fortnight.

Eclipse season of April 1931
April 2 Descending node (full moon)	April 18 Ascending node (new moon)
Total lunar eclipse Lunar Saros 121	Partial solar eclipse Solar Saros 147

== Related eclipses ==
=== Eclipses in 1931 ===
- A total lunar eclipse on April 2.
- A partial solar eclipse on April 18.
- A partial solar eclipse on September 12.
- A total lunar eclipse on September 26.
- A partial solar eclipse on October 11.

=== Metonic ===
- Preceded by: Lunar eclipse of June 15, 1927
- Followed by: Lunar eclipse of January 19, 1935

=== Tzolkinex ===
- Preceded by: Lunar eclipse of February 20, 1924
- Followed by: Lunar eclipse of May 14, 1938

=== Half-Saros ===
- Preceded by: Solar eclipse of March 28, 1922
- Followed by: Solar eclipse of April 7, 1940

=== Tritos ===
- Preceded by: Lunar eclipse of May 3, 1920
- Followed by: Lunar eclipse of March 3, 1942

=== Lunar Saros 121 ===
- Preceded by: Lunar eclipse of March 22, 1913
- Followed by: Lunar eclipse of April 13, 1949

=== Inex ===
- Preceded by: Lunar eclipse of April 22, 1902
- Followed by: Lunar eclipse of March 13, 1960

=== Triad ===
- Preceded by: Lunar eclipse of May 31, 1844
- Followed by: Lunar eclipse of January 31, 2018

=== Lunar eclipses of 1930–1933 ===
This eclipse is a member of a semester series. An eclipse in a semester series of lunar eclipses repeats approximately every 177 days and 4 hours (a semester) at alternating nodes of the Moon's orbit.

The penumbral lunar eclipses on February 10, 1933 and August 5, 1933 occur in the next lunar year eclipse set.

Lunar eclipse series sets from 1930 to 1933
Descending node				Ascending node			
Saros	Date Viewing	Type Chart	Gamma	Saros	Date Viewing	Type Chart	Gamma
111	1930 Apr 13	Partial	0.9545	116	1930 Oct 07	Partial	−0.9812
121	1931 Apr 02	Total	0.2043	126	1931 Sep 26	Total	−0.2698
131	1932 Mar 22	Partial	−0.4956	136	1932 Sep 14	Partial	0.4664
141	1933 Mar 12	Penumbral	−1.2369	146	1933 Sep 04	Penumbral	1.1776

=== Saros 121 ===
This eclipse is a part of Saros series 121, repeating every 18 years, 11 days, and containing 82 events. The series started with a penumbral lunar eclipse on October 6, 1047. It contains partial eclipses from May 10, 1408 through July 3, 1498; total eclipses from July 13, 1516 through May 26, 2021; and a second set of partial eclipses from June 6, 2039 through August 11, 2147. The series ends at member 82 as a penumbral eclipse on March 18, 2508.

The longest duration of totality was produced by member 43 at 100 minutes, 29 seconds on October 18, 1660. All eclipses in this series occur at the Moon’s descending node of orbit.

Greatest	First			
The greatest eclipse of the series occurred on 1660 Oct 18, lasting 100 minutes, 29 seconds.	Penumbral	Partial	Total	Central
The greatest eclipse of the series occurred on 1660 Oct 18, lasting 100 minutes, 29 seconds.	1047 Oct 06	1408 May 10	1516 Jul 13	1570 Aug 15
The greatest eclipse of the series occurred on 1660 Oct 18, lasting 100 minutes, 29 seconds.	Last			
The greatest eclipse of the series occurred on 1660 Oct 18, lasting 100 minutes, 29 seconds.	Central	Total	Partial	Penumbral
The greatest eclipse of the series occurred on 1660 Oct 18, lasting 100 minutes, 29 seconds.	1949 Apr 13	2021 May 26	2147 Aug 11	2508 Mar 18

Eclipses are tabulated in three columns; every third eclipse in the same column is one exeligmos apart, so they all cast shadows over approximately the same parts of the Earth.

Series members 43–64 occur between 1801 and 2200:
43	44	45
1805 Jan 15	1823 Jan 26	1841 Feb 06
46	47	48
1859 Feb 17	1877 Feb 27	1895 Mar 11
49	50	51
1913 Mar 22	1931 Apr 02	1949 Apr 13
52	53	54
1967 Apr 24	1985 May 04	2003 May 16
55	56	57
2021 May 26	2039 Jun 06	2057 Jun 17
58	59	60
2075 Jun 28	2093 Jul 08	2111 Jul 21
61	62	63
2129 Jul 31	2147 Aug 11	2165 Aug 21
64
2183 Sep 02

=== Tritos series ===
This eclipse is a part of a tritos cycle, repeating at alternating nodes every 135 synodic months (≈ 3986.63 days, or 11 years minus 1 month). Their appearance and longitude are irregular due to a lack of synchronization with the anomalistic month (period of perigee), but groupings of 3 tritos cycles (≈ 33 years minus 3 months) come close (≈ 434.044 anomalistic months), so eclipses are similar in these groupings.

Series members between 1801 and 2200
1811 Mar 10 (Saros 110)	1822 Feb 06 (Saros 111)	1833 Jan 06 (Saros 112)	1843 Dec 07 (Saros 113)	1854 Nov 04 (Saros 114)
1865 Oct 04 (Saros 115)	1876 Sep 03 (Saros 116)	1887 Aug 03 (Saros 117)	1898 Jul 03 (Saros 118)	1909 Jun 04 (Saros 119)
1920 May 03 (Saros 120)	1931 Apr 02 (Saros 121)	1942 Mar 03 (Saros 122)	1953 Jan 29 (Saros 123)	1963 Dec 30 (Saros 124)
1974 Nov 29 (Saros 125)	1985 Oct 28 (Saros 126)	1996 Sep 27 (Saros 127)	2007 Aug 28 (Saros 128)	2018 Jul 27 (Saros 129)
2029 Jun 26 (Saros 130)	2040 May 26 (Saros 131)	2051 Apr 26 (Saros 132)	2062 Mar 25 (Saros 133)	2073 Feb 22 (Saros 134)
2084 Jan 22 (Saros 135)	2094 Dec 21 (Saros 136)	2105 Nov 21 (Saros 137)	2116 Oct 21 (Saros 138)	2127 Sep 20 (Saros 139)
2138 Aug 20 (Saros 140)	2149 Jul 20 (Saros 141)	2160 Jun 18 (Saros 142)	2171 May 19 (Saros 143)	2182 Apr 18 (Saros 144)
2193 Mar 17 (Saros 145)

=== Inex series ===
This eclipse is a part of the long period inex cycle, repeating at alternating nodes, every 358 synodic months (≈ 10,571.95 days, or 29 years minus 20 days). Their appearance and longitude are irregular due to a lack of synchronization with the anomalistic month (period of perigee). However, groupings of 3 inex cycles (≈ 87 years minus 2 months) comes close (≈ 1,151.02 anomalistic months), so eclipses are similar in these groupings.

Series members between 1801 and 2200
1815 Jun 21 (Saros 117)	1844 May 31 (Saros 118)	1873 May 12 (Saros 119)
1902 Apr 22 (Saros 120)	1931 Apr 02 (Saros 121)	1960 Mar 13 (Saros 122)
1989 Feb 20 (Saros 123)	2018 Jan 31 (Saros 124)	2047 Jan 12 (Saros 125)
2075 Dec 22 (Saros 126)	2104 Dec 02 (Saros 127)	2133 Nov 12 (Saros 128)
2162 Oct 23 (Saros 129)	2191 Oct 02 (Saros 130)	

=== Half-Saros cycle ===
A lunar eclipse will be preceded and followed by solar eclipses by 9 years and 5.5 days (a half saros). This lunar eclipse is related to two total solar eclipses of Solar Saros 128.

March 28, 1922	April 7, 1940

== See also ==
- List of lunar eclipses
- List of 20th-century lunar eclipses
