= January 2018 lunar eclipse =

Total lunar eclipse of January 31, 2018

- Total eclipse
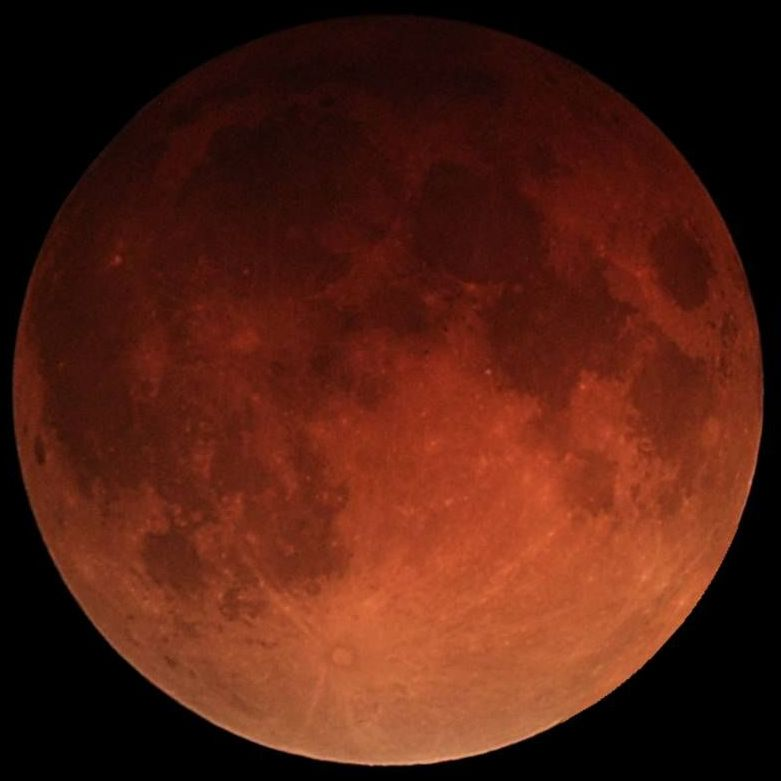
- Totality as viewed from Lomita, California
- Date: January 31, 2018
- Gamma: −0.3014
- Magnitude: 1.3155
- Saros cycle: 124 (49 of 74)
- Totality: 76 minutes, 4 seconds
- Partiality: 202 minutes, 44 seconds
- Penumbral: 317 minutes, 12 seconds
Contacts (UTC)
- P1: 10:51:15
- U1: 11:48:27
- U2: 12:51:47
- Greatest: 13:29:50
- U3: 14:07:51
- U4: 15:11:11
- P4: 16:08:27

A total lunar eclipse occurred at the Moon’s ascending node of orbit on Wednesday, January 31, 2018, with an umbral magnitude of 1.3155. A lunar eclipse occurs when the Moon moves into the Earth's shadow, causing the Moon to be darkened. A total lunar eclipse occurs when the Moon's near side entirely passes into the Earth's umbral shadow. Unlike a solar eclipse, which can only be viewed from a relatively small area of the world, a lunar eclipse may be viewed from anywhere on the night side of Earth. A total lunar eclipse can last up to nearly two hours, while a total solar eclipse lasts only a few minutes at any given place, because the Moon's shadow is smaller. Occurring about 1.4 days after perigee (on January 30, 2018, at 4:55 UTC), the Moon's apparent diameter was larger.

Because the Moon was near its perigee on January 30, it may be described as a "supermoon", when the Moon's distance from the Earth is less than 360,000 km (223,694 miles). The previous supermoon lunar eclipse was on September 28, 2015. The Moon was 360,202 km (223,819 mi) from the Earth. This eclipse also coincided with a blue moon, which occurs when there are two full moons in the same calendar month, or if there are four full moons in the same season (third of four is blue moon). As this supermoon was also a blue moon (the second full moon in a calendar month), it was referred to as a "super blue blood moon"; "blood" refers to the typical red color of the Moon during a total lunar eclipse. This event was called a 'Trifecta'. This coincidence last occurred on December 30, 1982 for the Eastern Hemisphere, and otherwise before that on March 31, 1866. The next occurrence will be on January 31, 2037, one metonic cycle (19 years) later.

== Background ==
A lunar eclipse occurs when the Moon passes within Earth's umbra (shadow). As the eclipse begins, Earth's shadow first darkens the Moon slightly. Then, the shadow begins to "cover" part of the Moon, turning it a dark red-brown color (typically – the color can vary based on atmospheric conditions). The Moon appears to be reddish because of Rayleigh scattering (the same effect that causes sunsets to appear reddish) and the refraction of that light by Earth's atmosphere into its umbra.

The following simulation shows the approximate appearance of the Moon passing through Earth's shadow. The northern portion of the Moon is closest to the center of the shadow, making it darkest and reddest in appearance.

=== "Super blue blood moon" ===
This was a "supermoon", as the Moon was near to its closest distance to earth in its elliptical orbit, making it 7% larger in apparent diameter or 14% larger in area, than an average full moon. The previous supermoon lunar eclipse was during the September 2015 lunar eclipse.

The full moon of January 31, 2018 was the second full moon that calendar month (in most time zones), making it, under one definition of the term, a "blue moon".

Additionally referencing the orange or red "blood" colors that occur during a lunar eclipse, media sources described the event as a "super blue blood Moon".

== Characteristics ==
=== Visibility ===
The Pacific Ocean was turned toward the Moon at the time of the eclipse. Central and eastern Asia (including most of Siberia), Philippines, Indonesia, New Zealand and most of Australia got a good view of this moon show in the evening sky. For Western Asia, the Indian subcontinent, the Middle East and Eastern Europe, the eclipse was underway as the moon rose.

Along the U.S. West Coast, the total phase began at 4:51 a.m. PST. The further east, the closer the start of the partial phases coincided with moonset. Along the U.S. Atlantic Seaboard, for instance, the Moon had only just begun to enter the darkest part of Earth's shadow, the umbra, at 6:48 a.m. EST when it disappeared from view below the west-northwest horizon. The duration of the total phase was 77 minutes, with the Moon tracking through the southern part of the Earth's shadow. During totality, the Moon's lower limb appeared brighter than the dark upper limb.

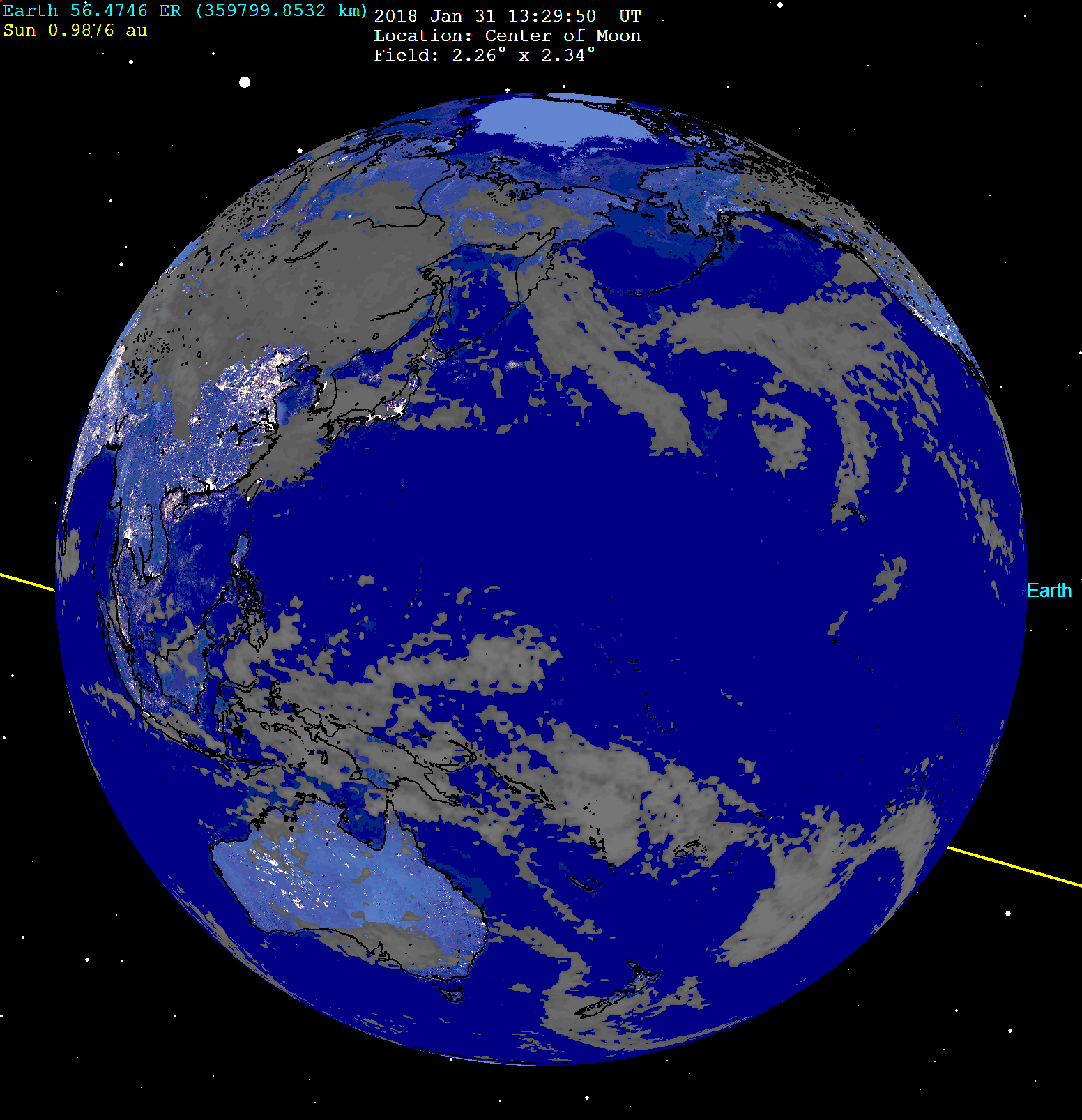
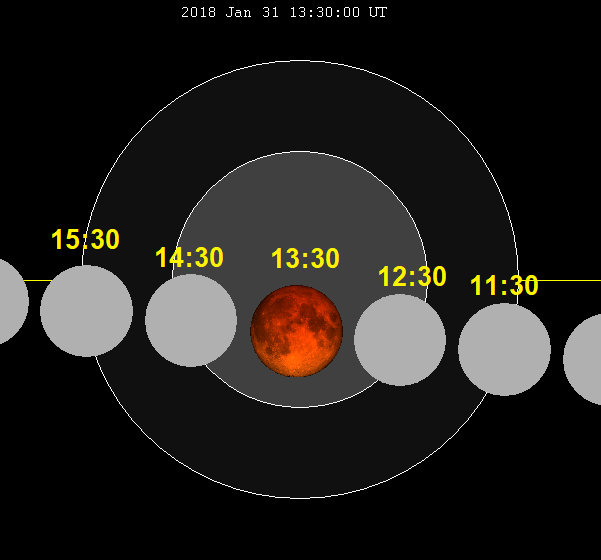
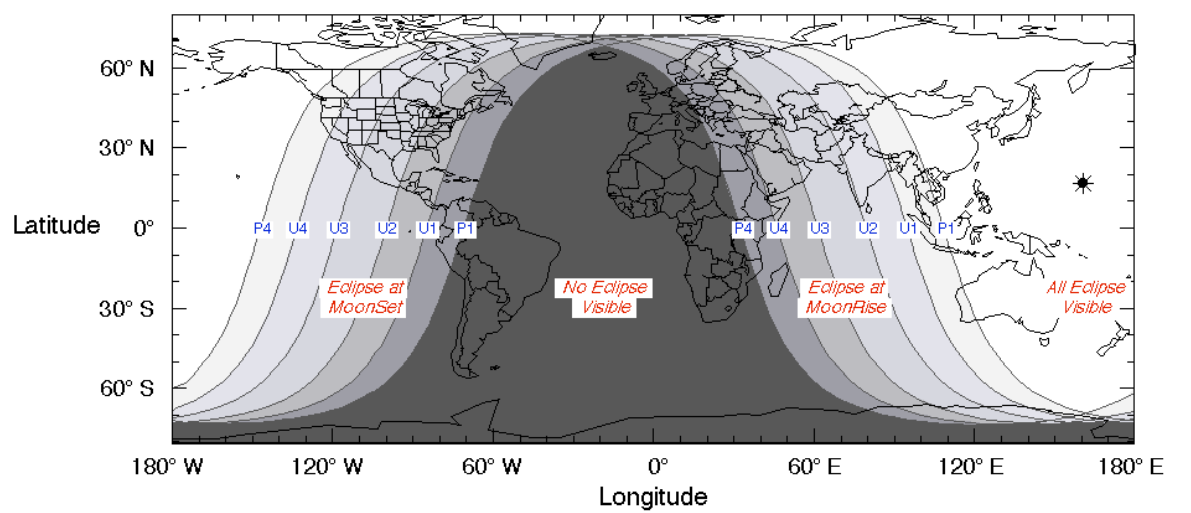
Visibility map

=== Timing ===
Event timing by time zone
Eclipse	HST	AKST	PST	MST	CST	EST	UTC	MSK	IST	ICT	CST	JST	AEDT	NZDT
Zone from UTC	−10 h	−9 h	−8 h	−7 h	−6 h	−5 h	0 h	+3 h	+5½ h	+7 h	+8 h	+9 h	+11 h	+13 h
Penumbral eclipse begins	00:51	01:51	02:51	03:51	04:51	05:51	10:51	13:51	—	17:51	18:51	19:51	21:51	23:51
Partial eclipse begins	01:48	02:48	03:48	04:48	05:48	06:48	11:48	14:48	17:18	18:48	19:48	20:48	22:48	00:48
Total eclipse begins	02:52	03:52	04:52	05:52	06:52	—	12:52	15:52	18:22	19:52	20:52	21:52	23:52	01:52
Mid-eclipse	03:30	04:30	05:30	06:30	—	—	13:30	16:30	19:00	20:30	21:30	22:30	00:30	02:30
Total eclipse ends	04:08	05:08	06:08	07:08	—	—	14:08	17:08	19:38	21:08	22:08	23:08	01:08	03:08
Partial eclipse ends	05:11	06:11	07:11	—	—	—	15:11	18:11	20:41	22:11	23:11	00:11	02:11	04:11
Penumbral eclipse ends	06:08	07:08	—	—	—	—	16:08	19:08	21:38	23:08	00:08	01:08	03:08	05:08

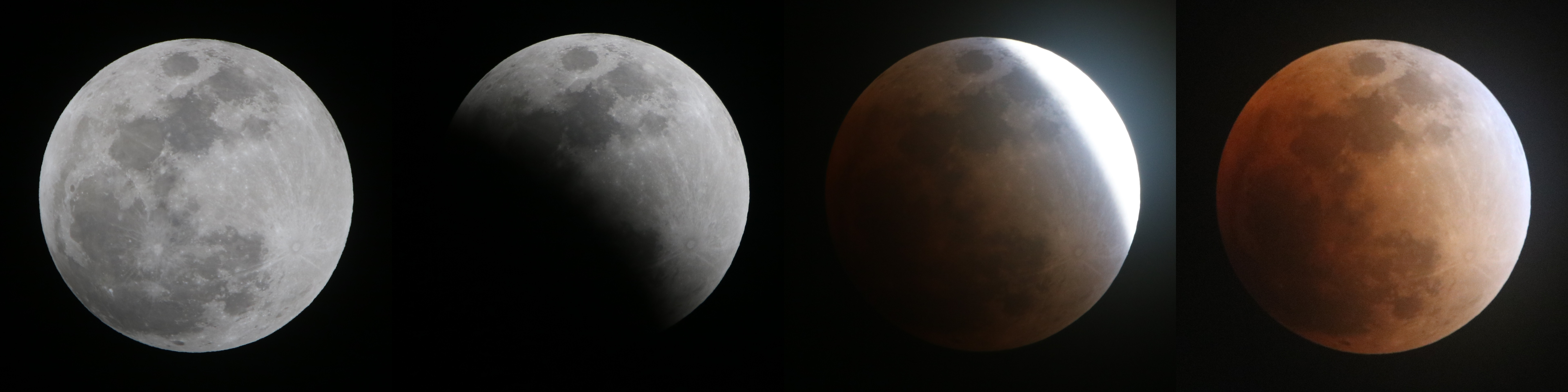
Example in Aichi Prefecture, Japan:
1. Penumbral lunar eclipse 20:23 (JST)
2. Partial lunar eclipse 21:13 (JST)
3. Partial lunar eclipse 21:43 (JST)
4. Total lunar eclipse (blood moon) 21:55 (JST)

== Gallery ==
=== North America ===
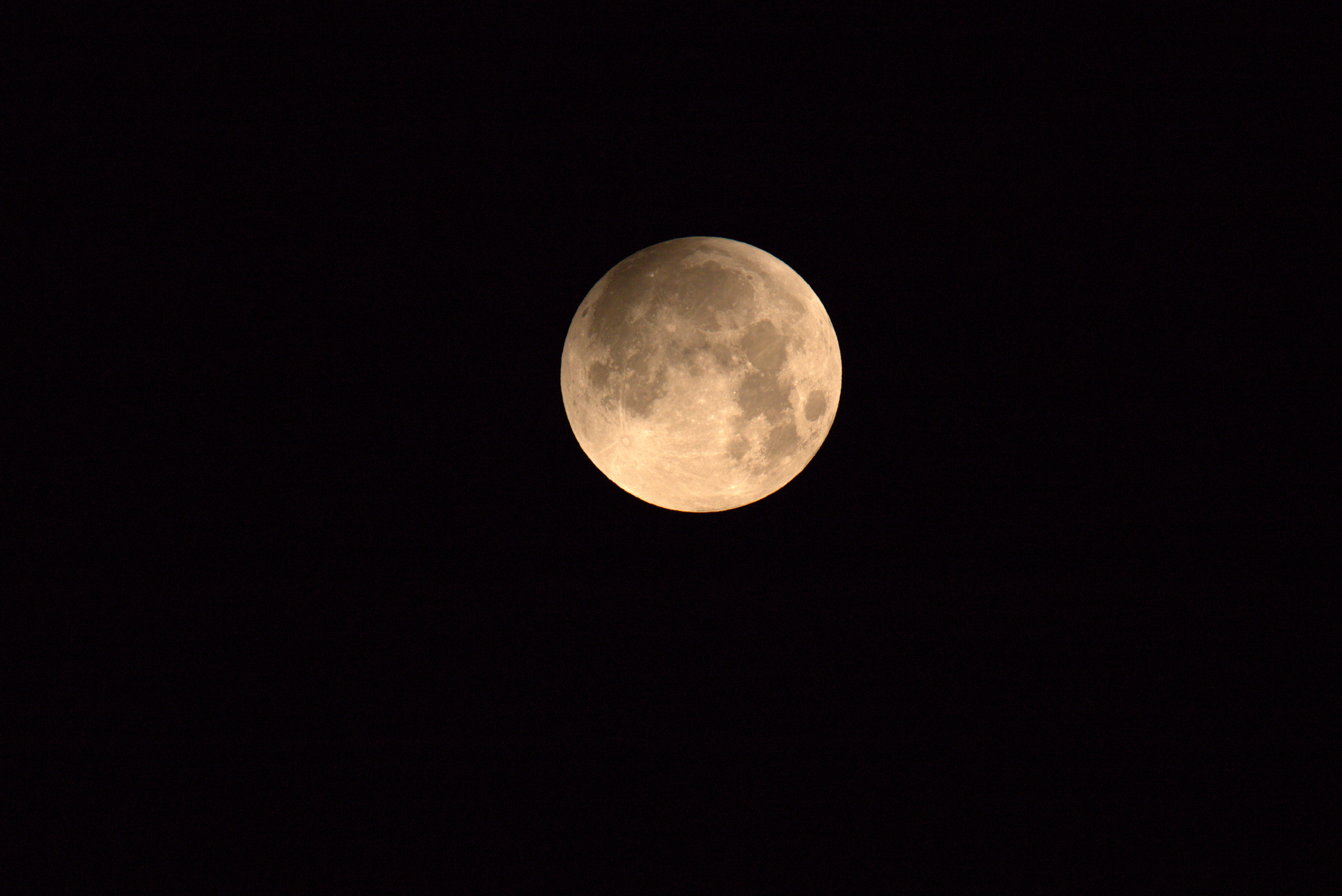
Fayetteville, North Carolina, 11:36 UTC

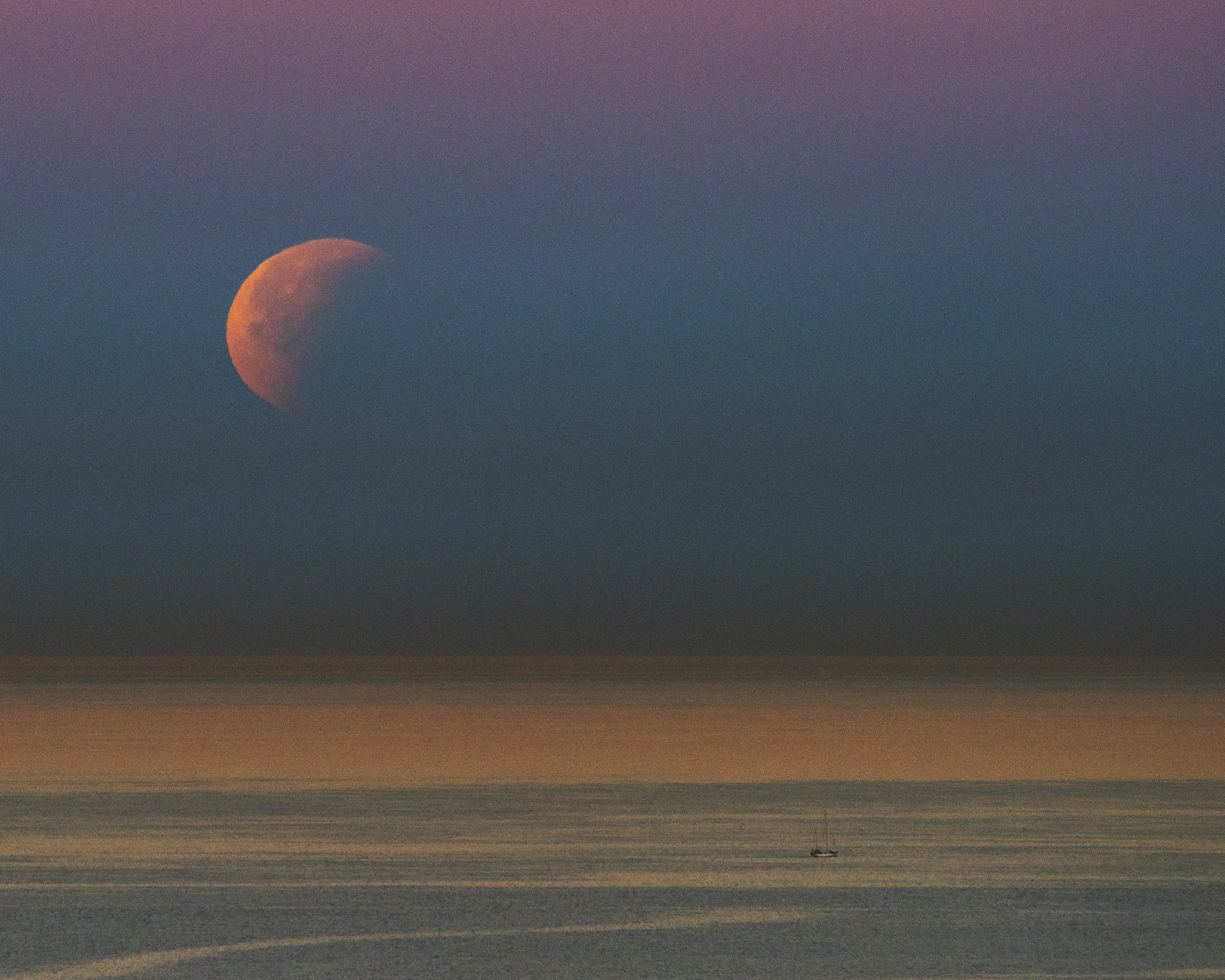
Partial from Naval Base Point Loma, California

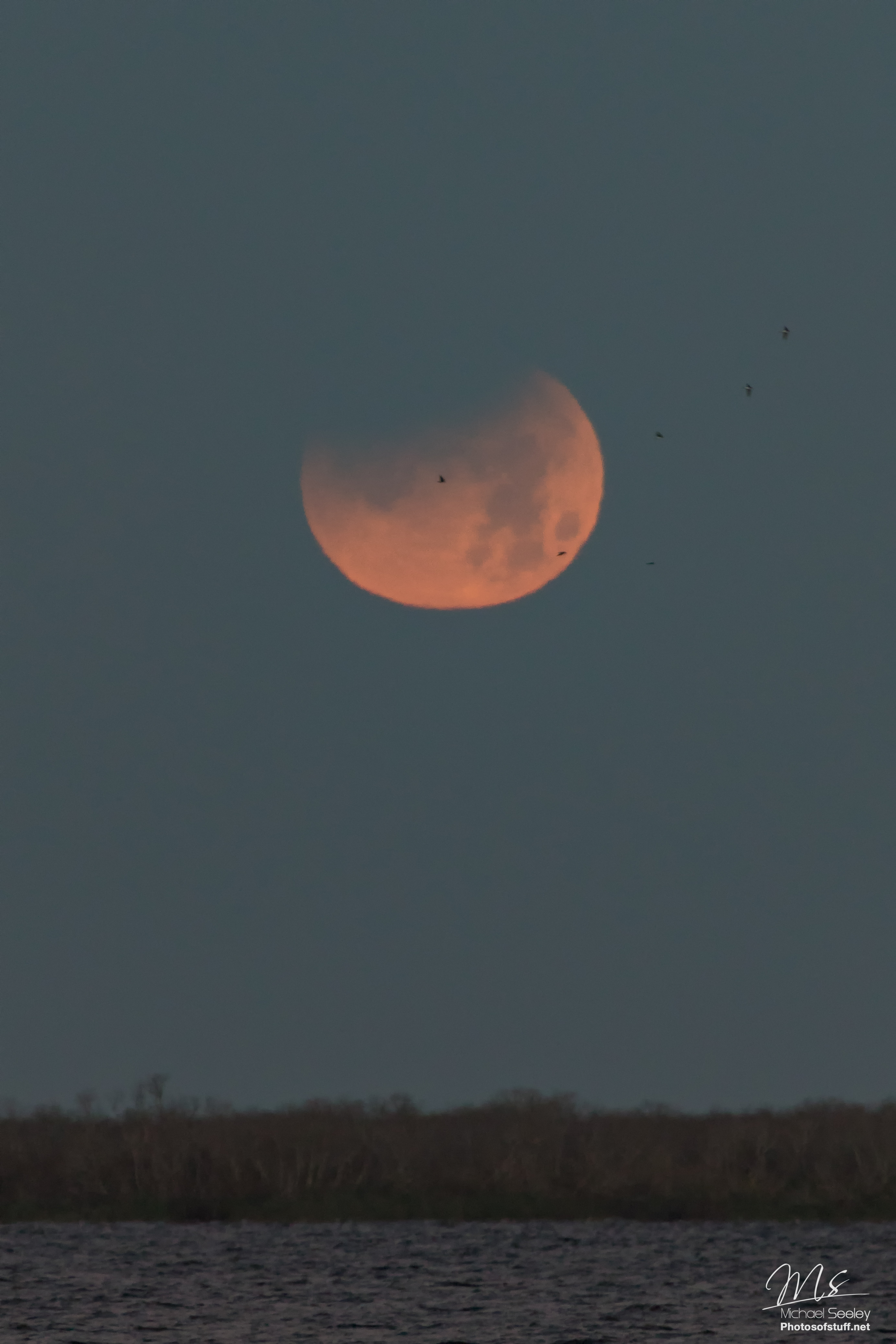
Melbourne, Florida, 12:00 UTC

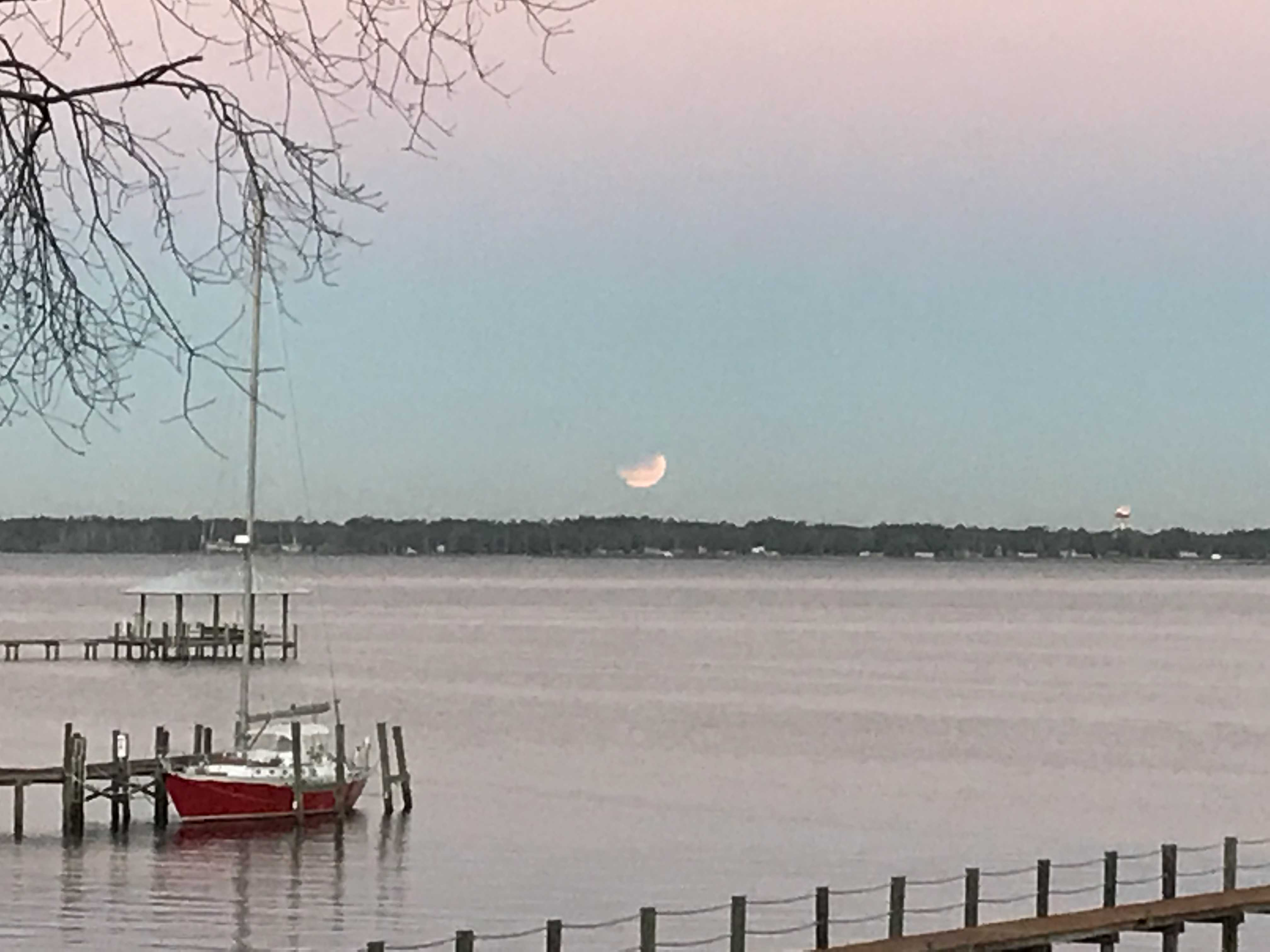
Jacksonville, Florida, 12:10 UTC

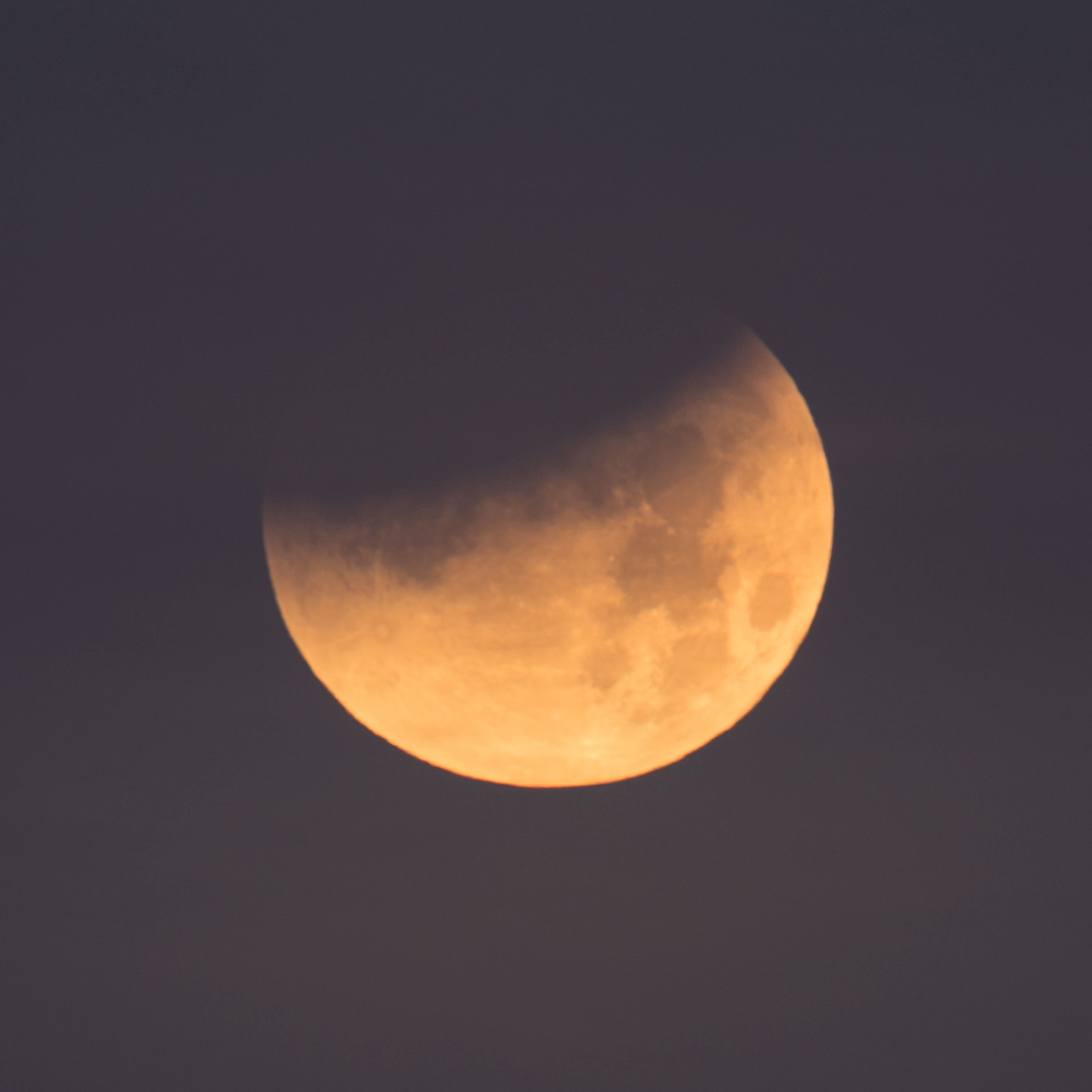
Macon, Georgia, 12:11 UTC

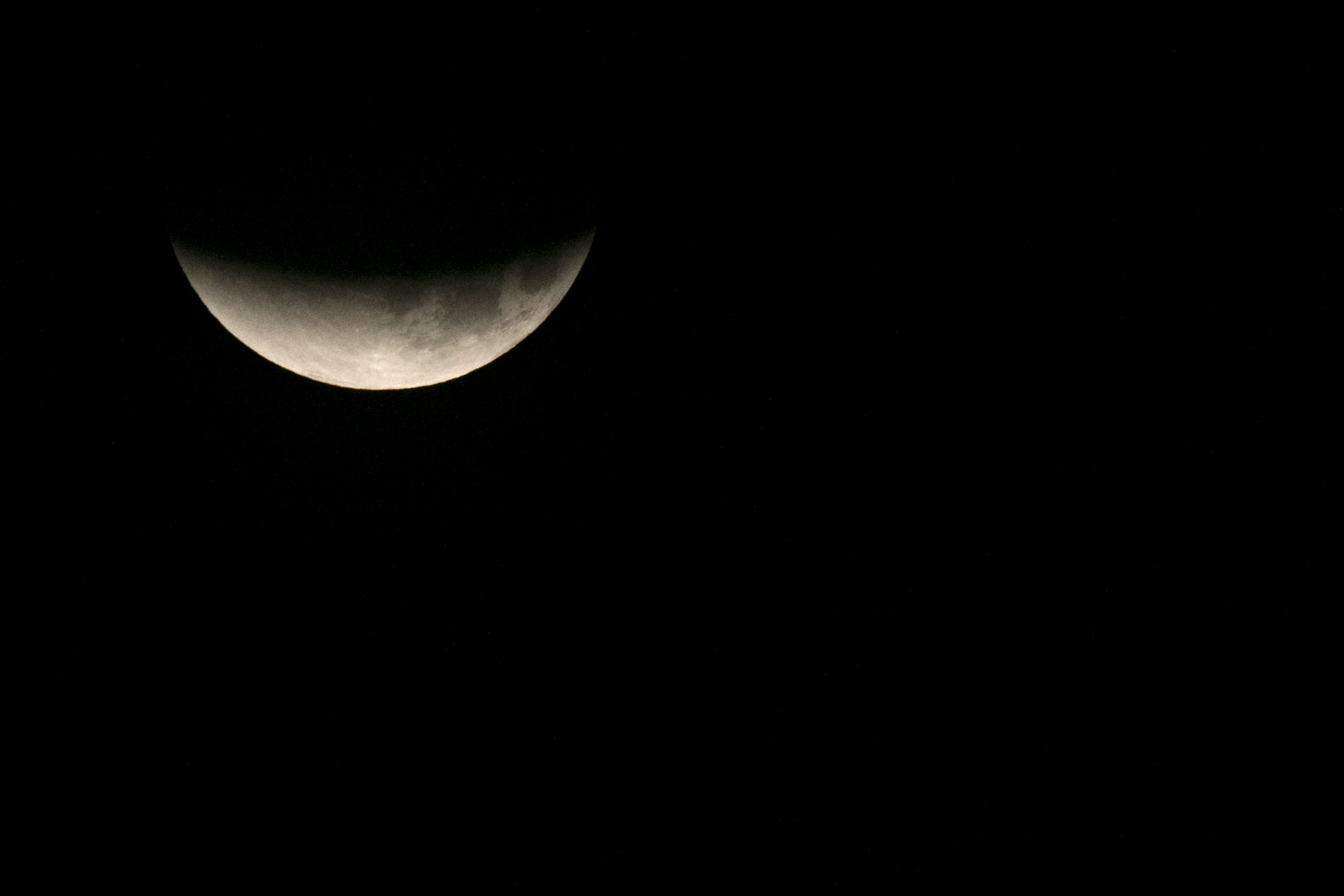
Tula, Tamaulipas, 12:29 UTC

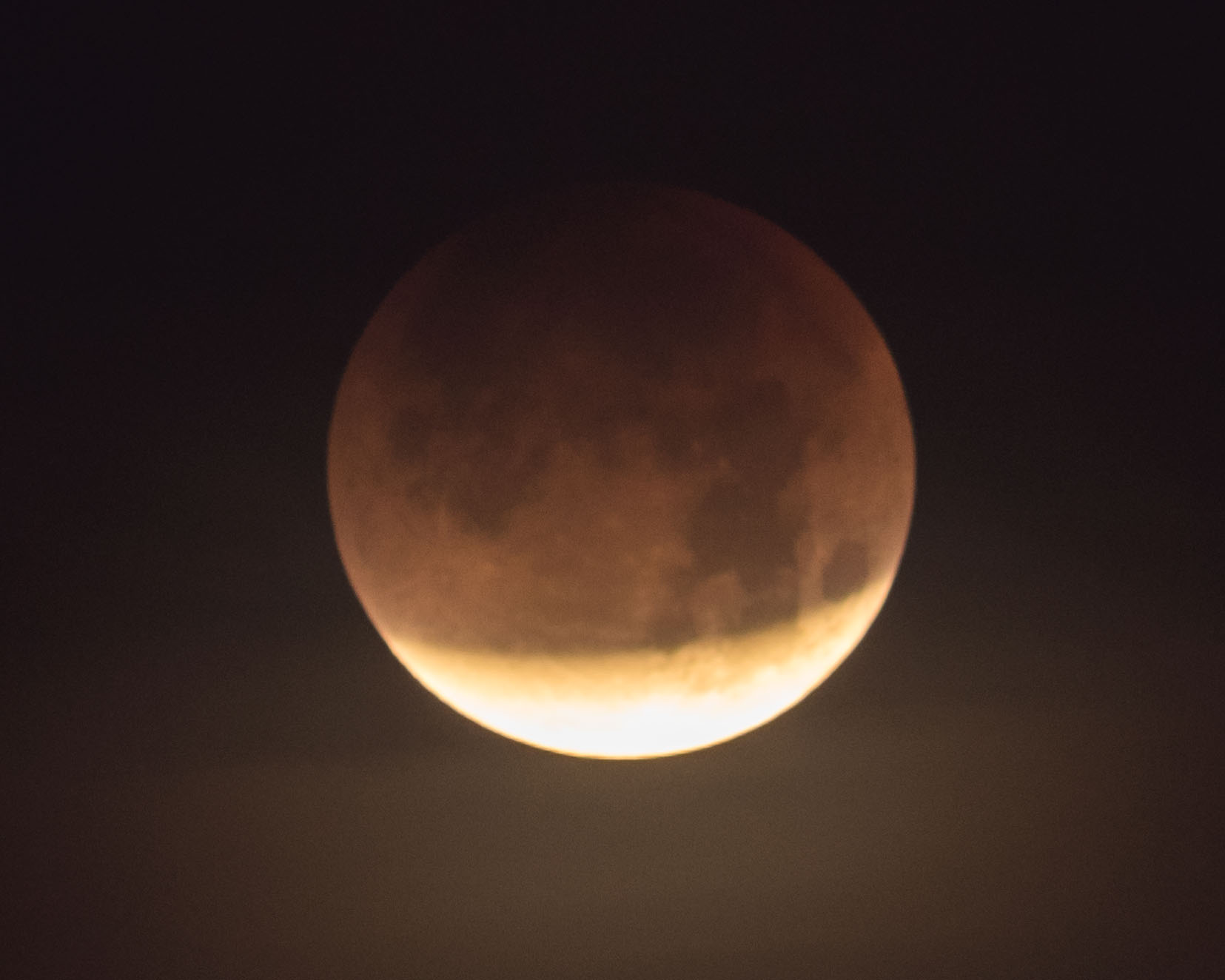
Houston, Texas, 12:41 UTC

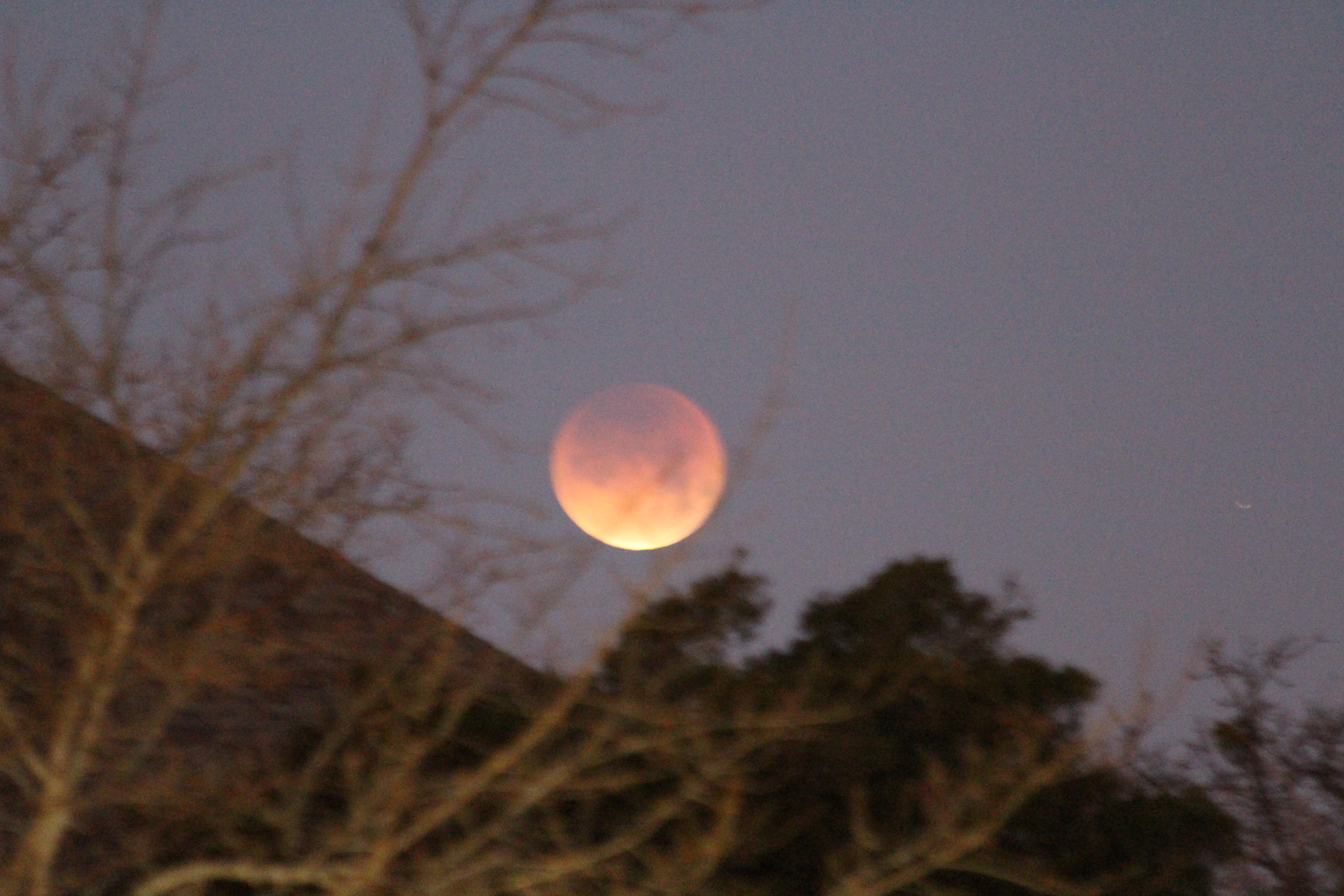
Dallas, Texas, 12:51 UTC

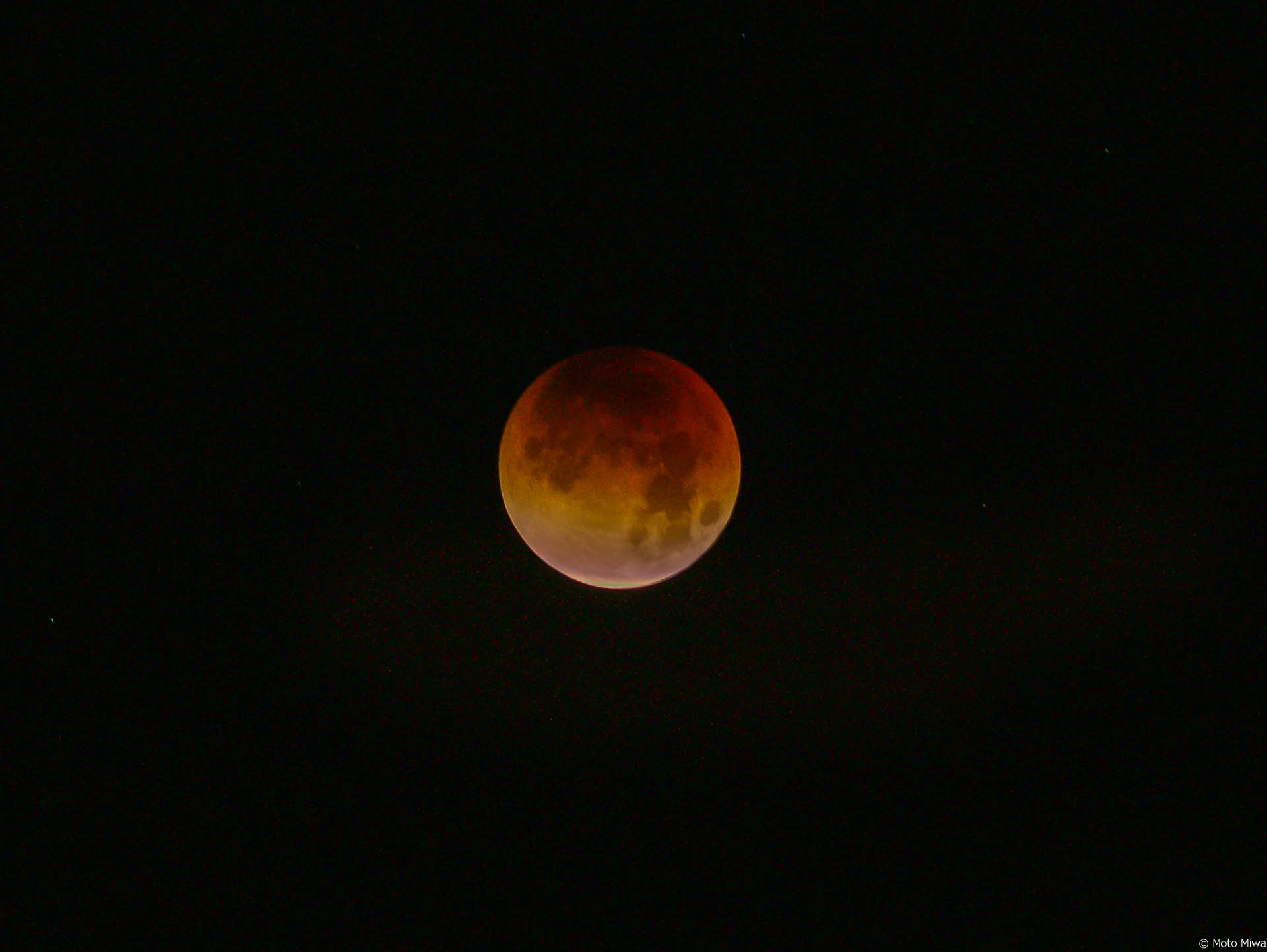
Totality from Southern California, 12:58 UTC

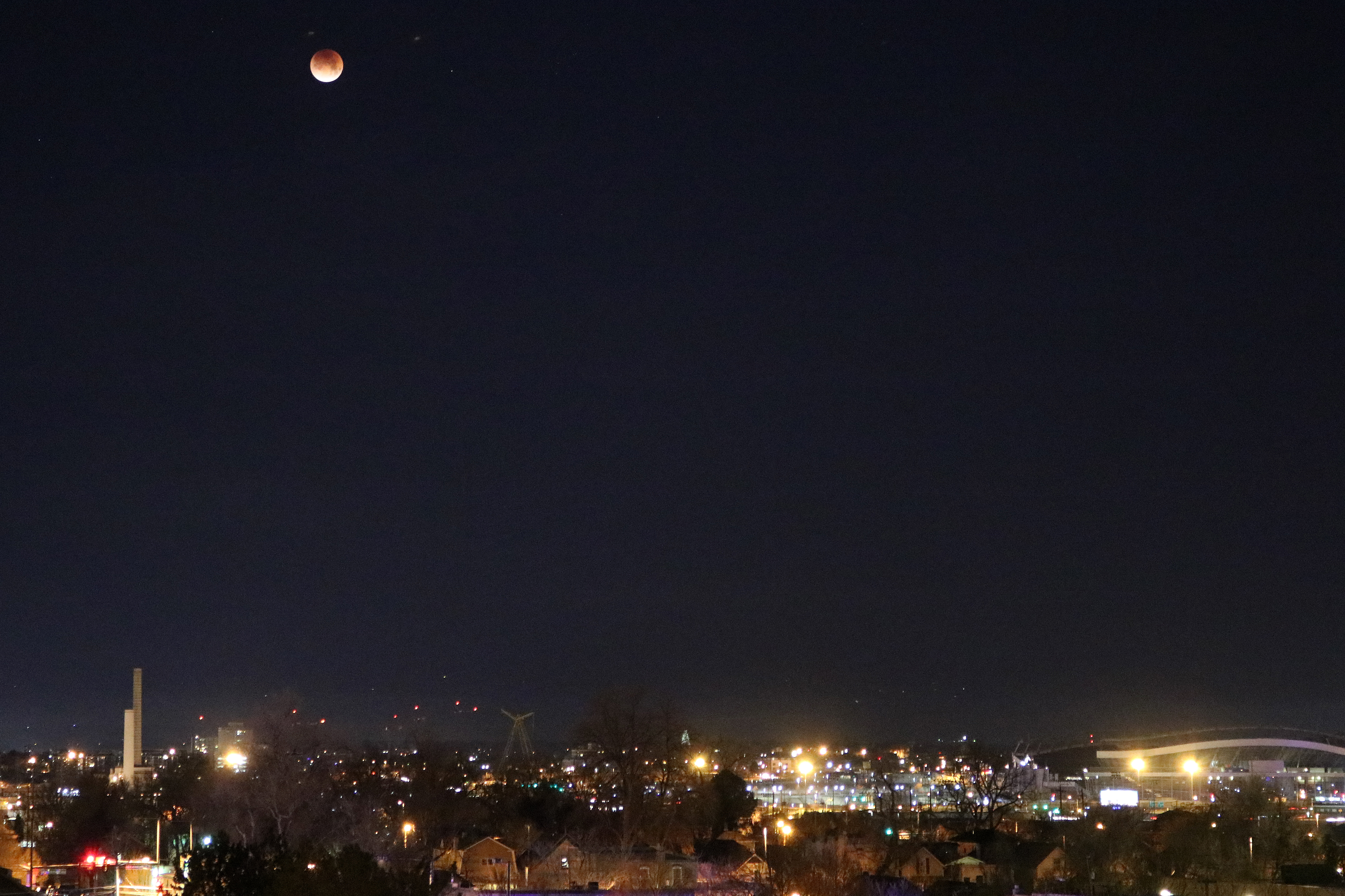
Denver, Colorado, 12:59 UTC

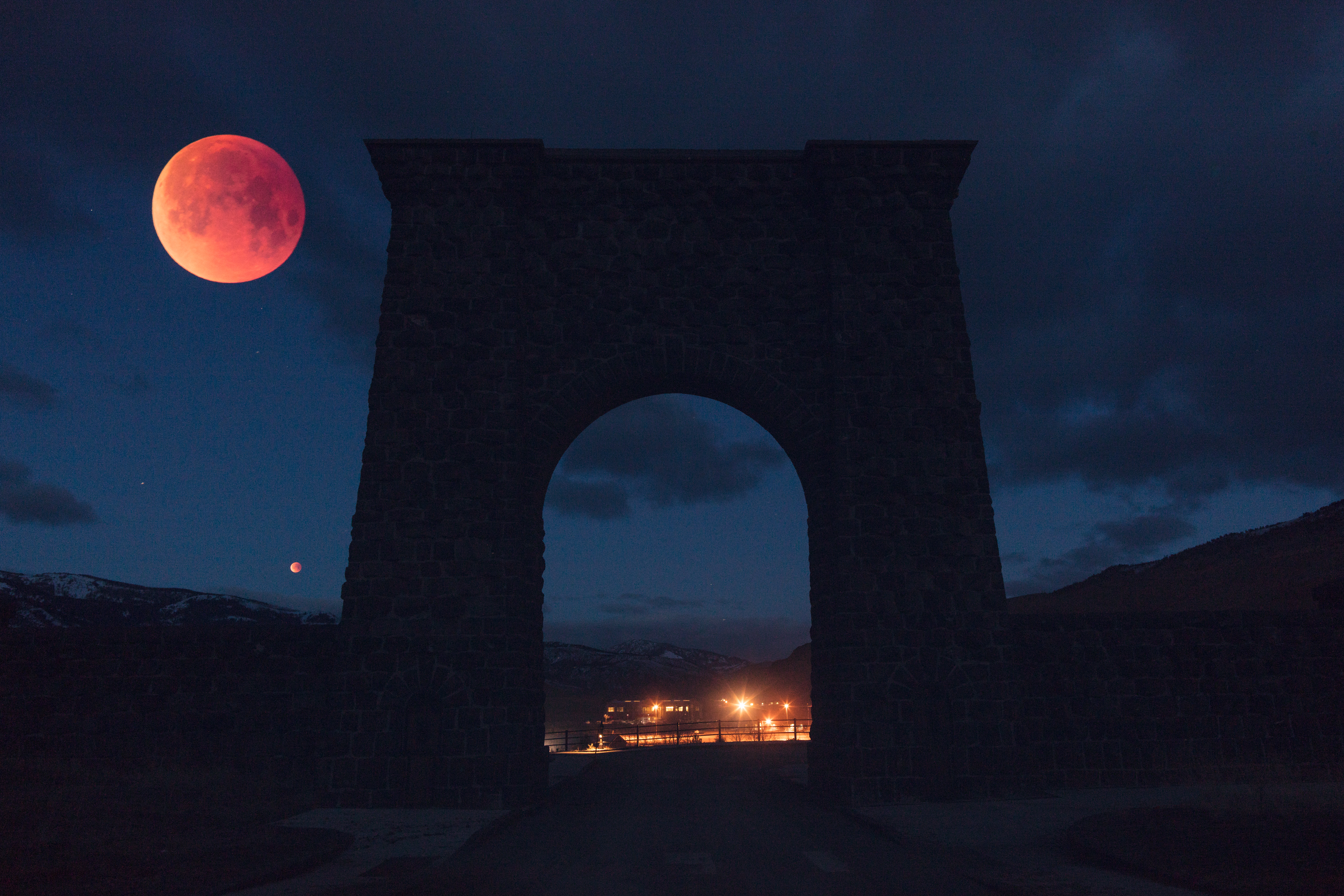
Yellowstone National Park, 13:03 UTC

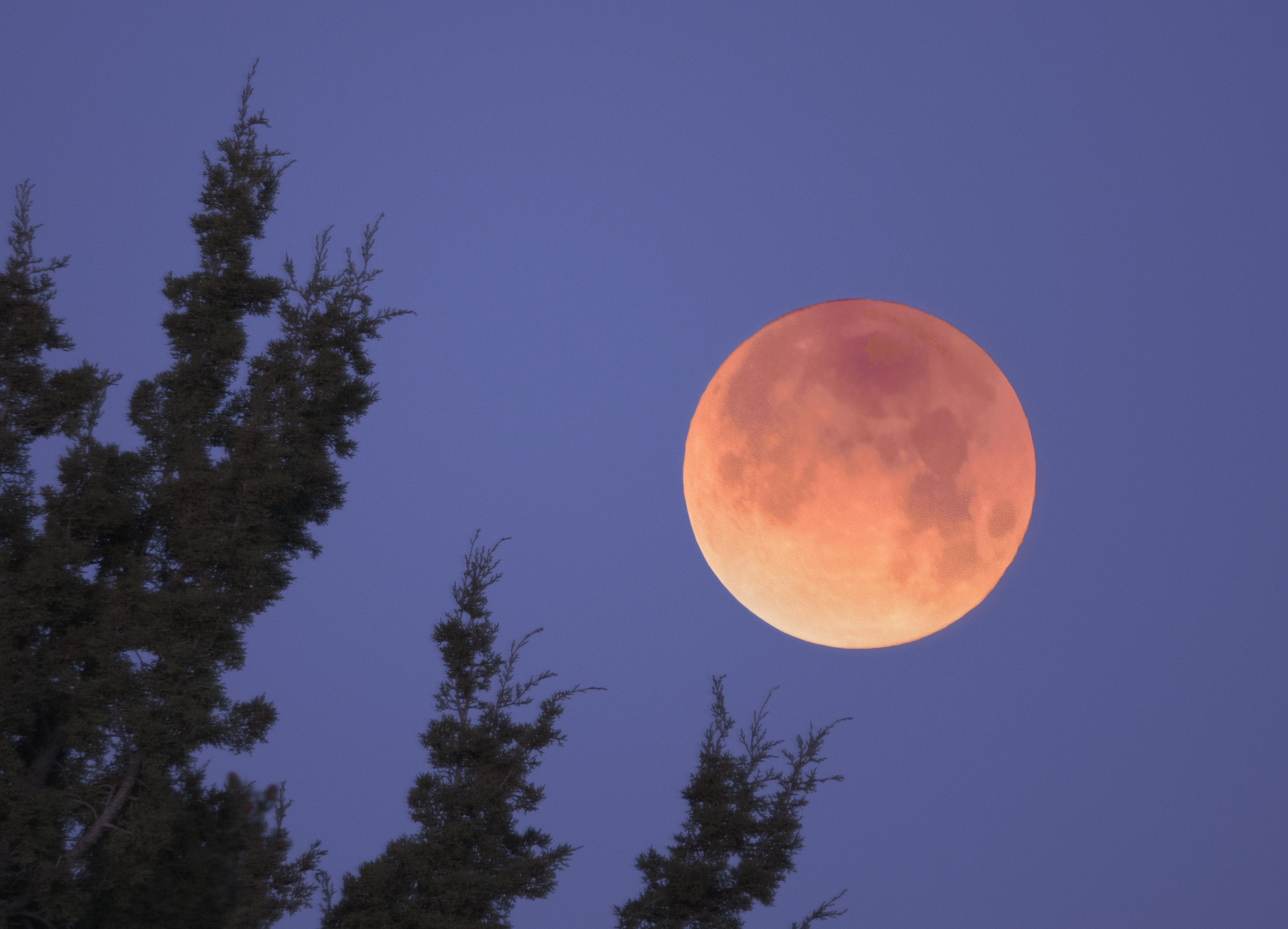
Placitas, New Mexico, 13:35 UTC

Redwood City, California, 13:43 UTC

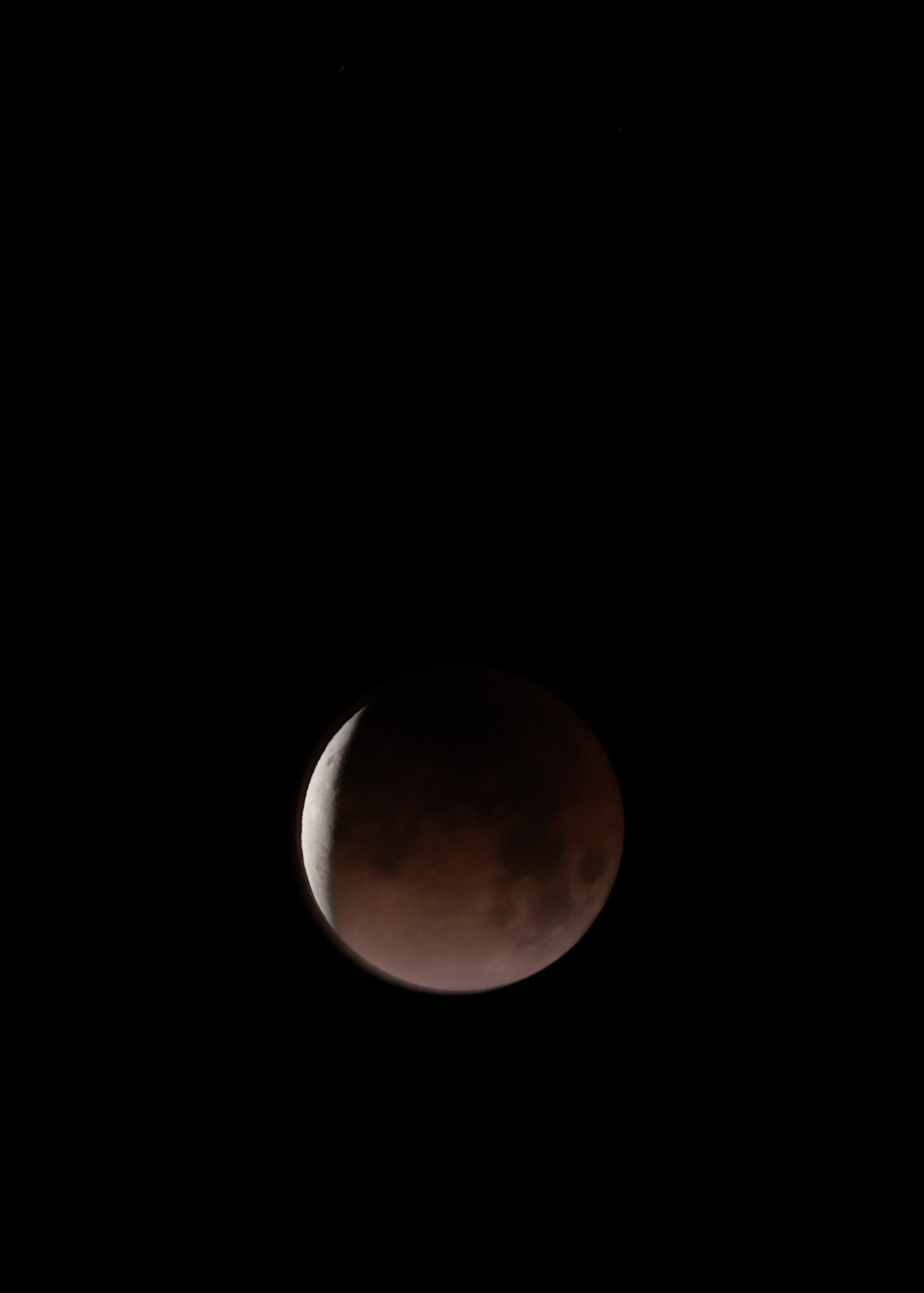
Novato, California, 14:13 UTC

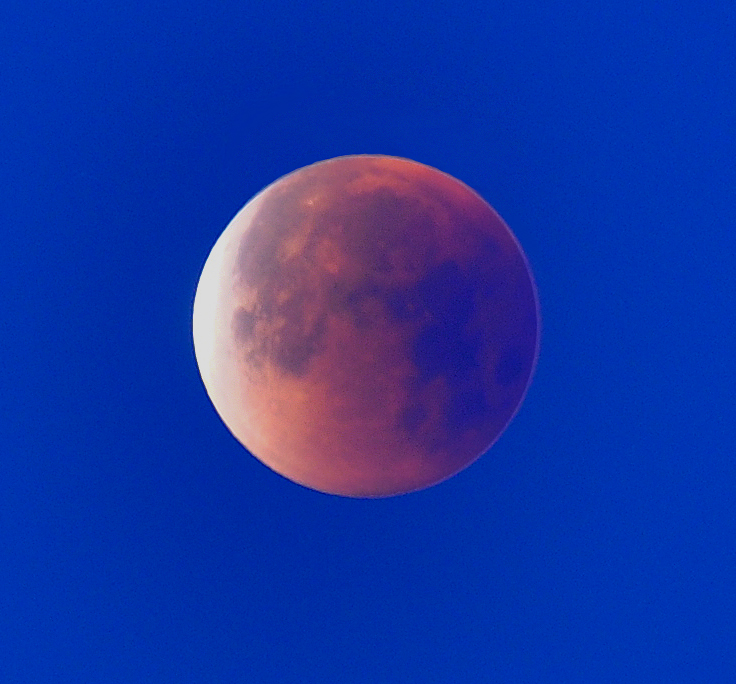
Landers, California at dawn

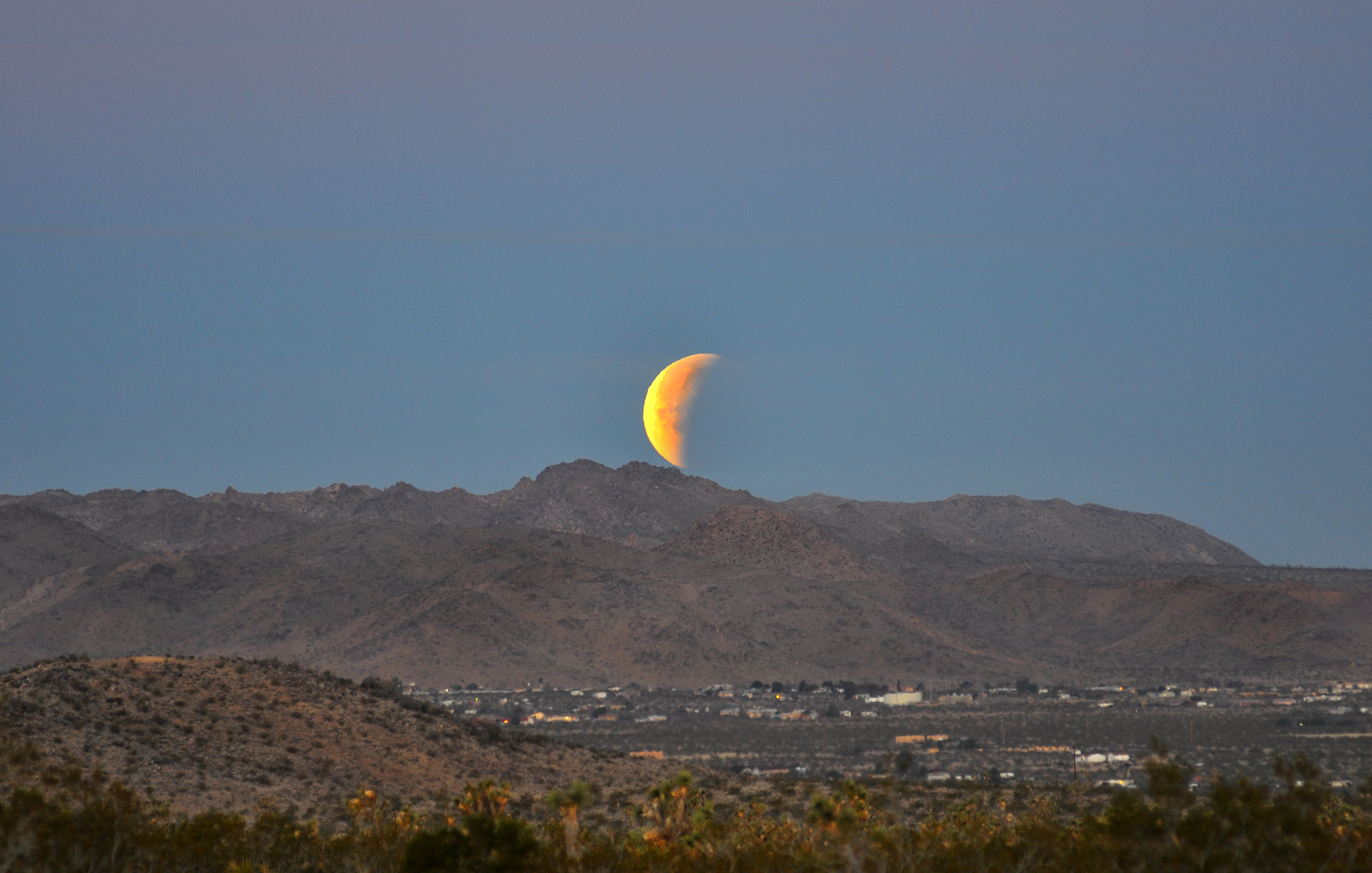
Joshua Tree, California

=== Asia and Middle East ===
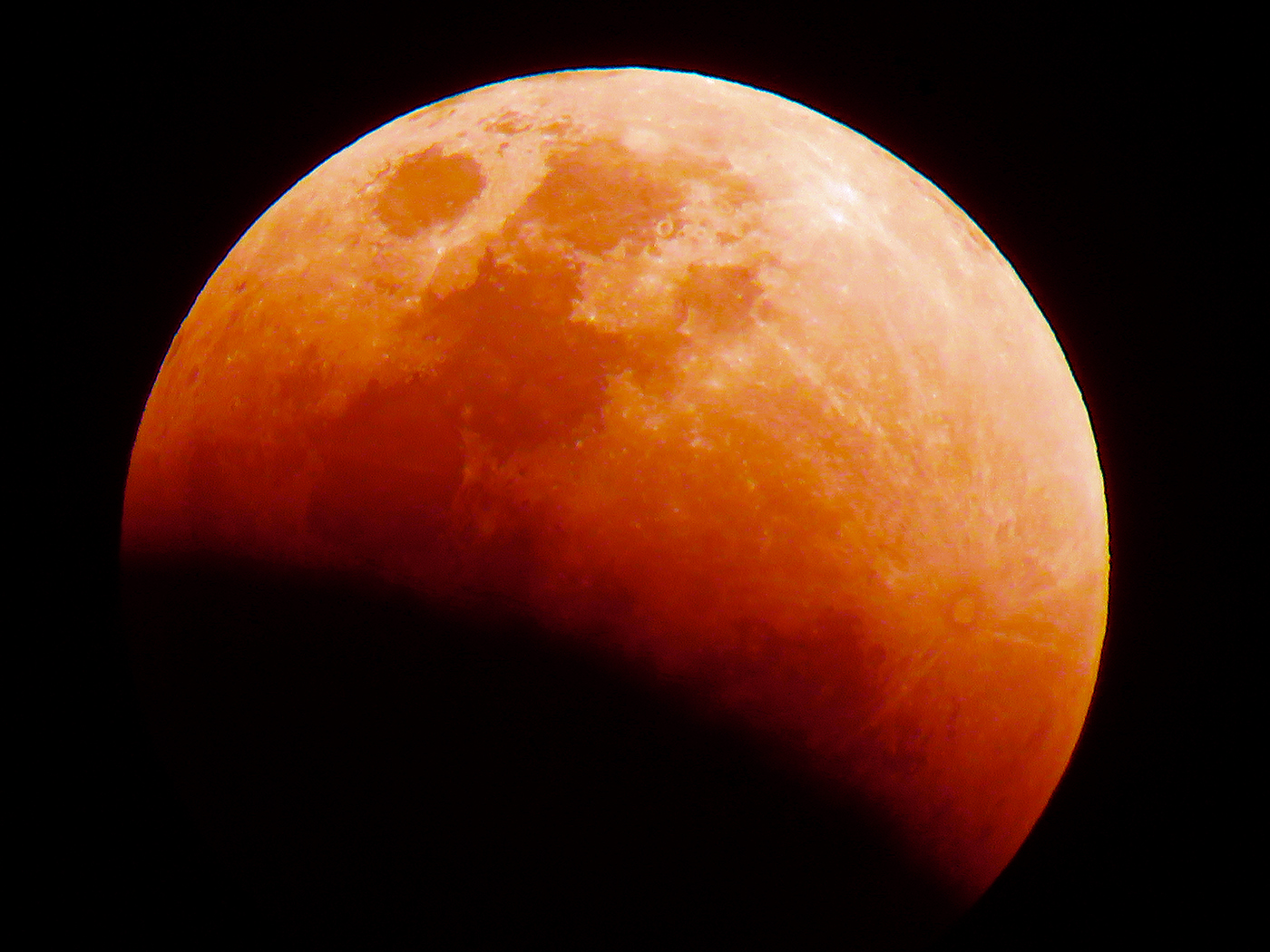
Partial from Ilagan, Isabela

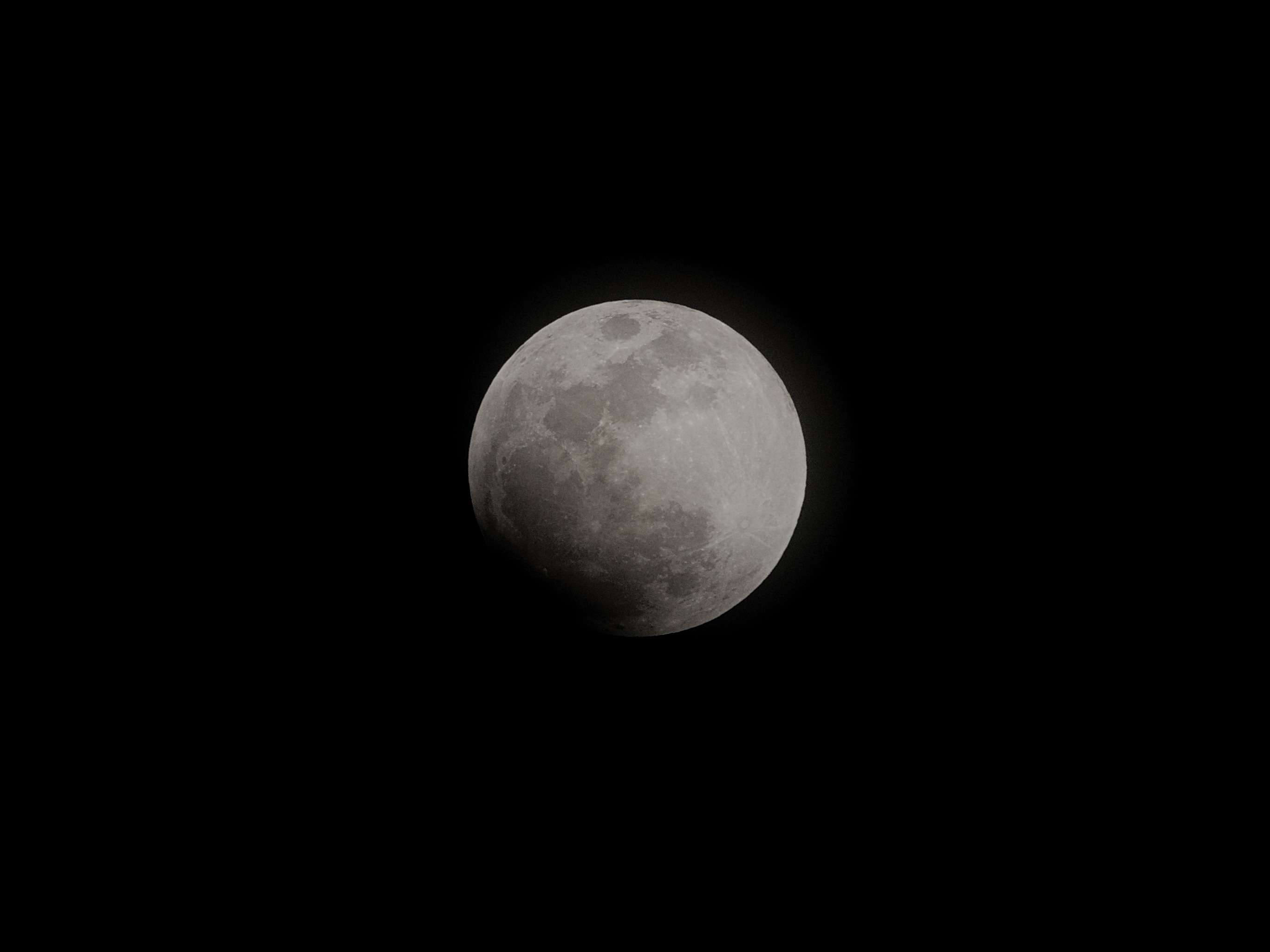
Hiroshima, Japan, 11:43 UTC

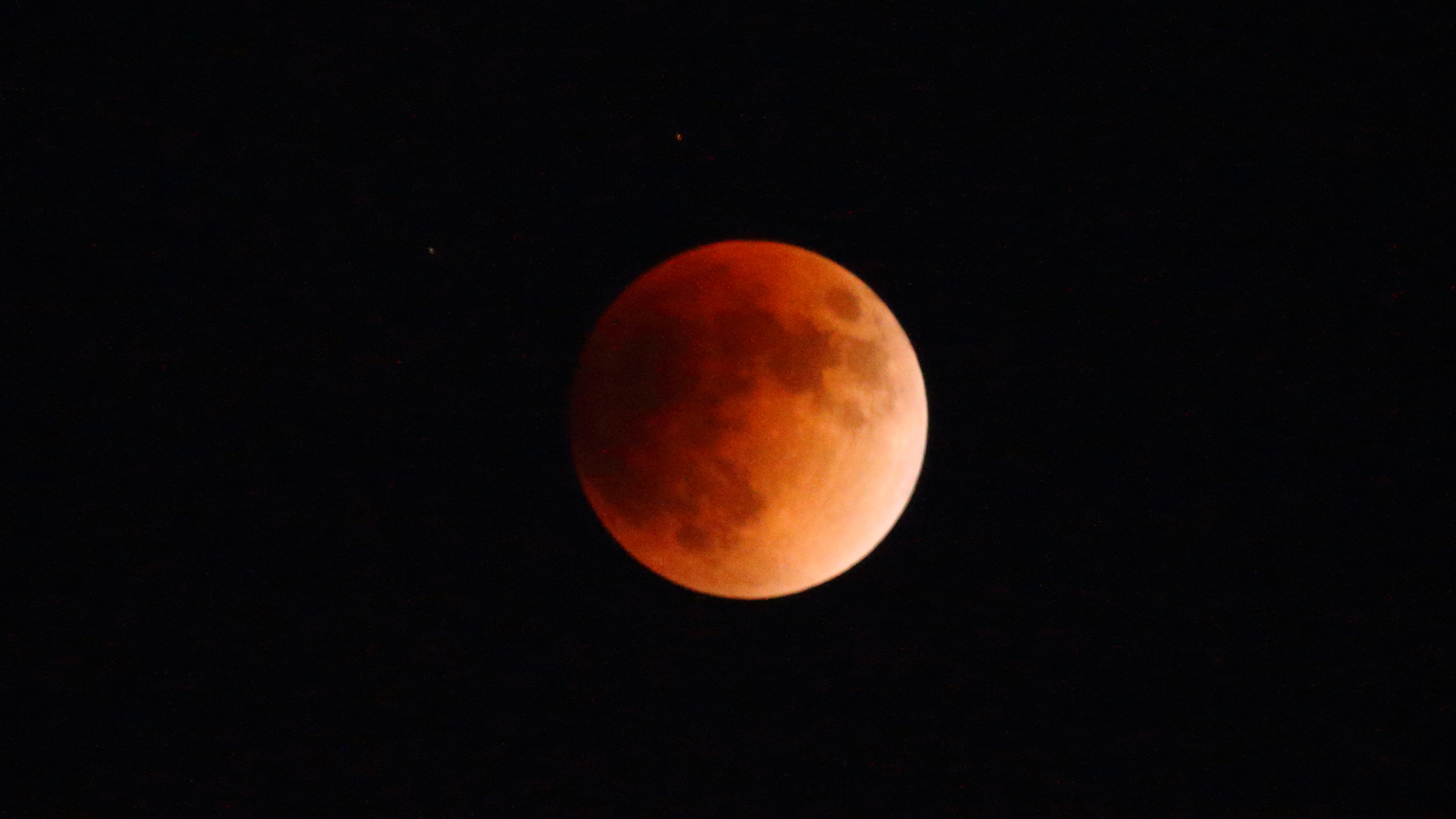
Shinjyuku, Tokyo, 12:52 UTC

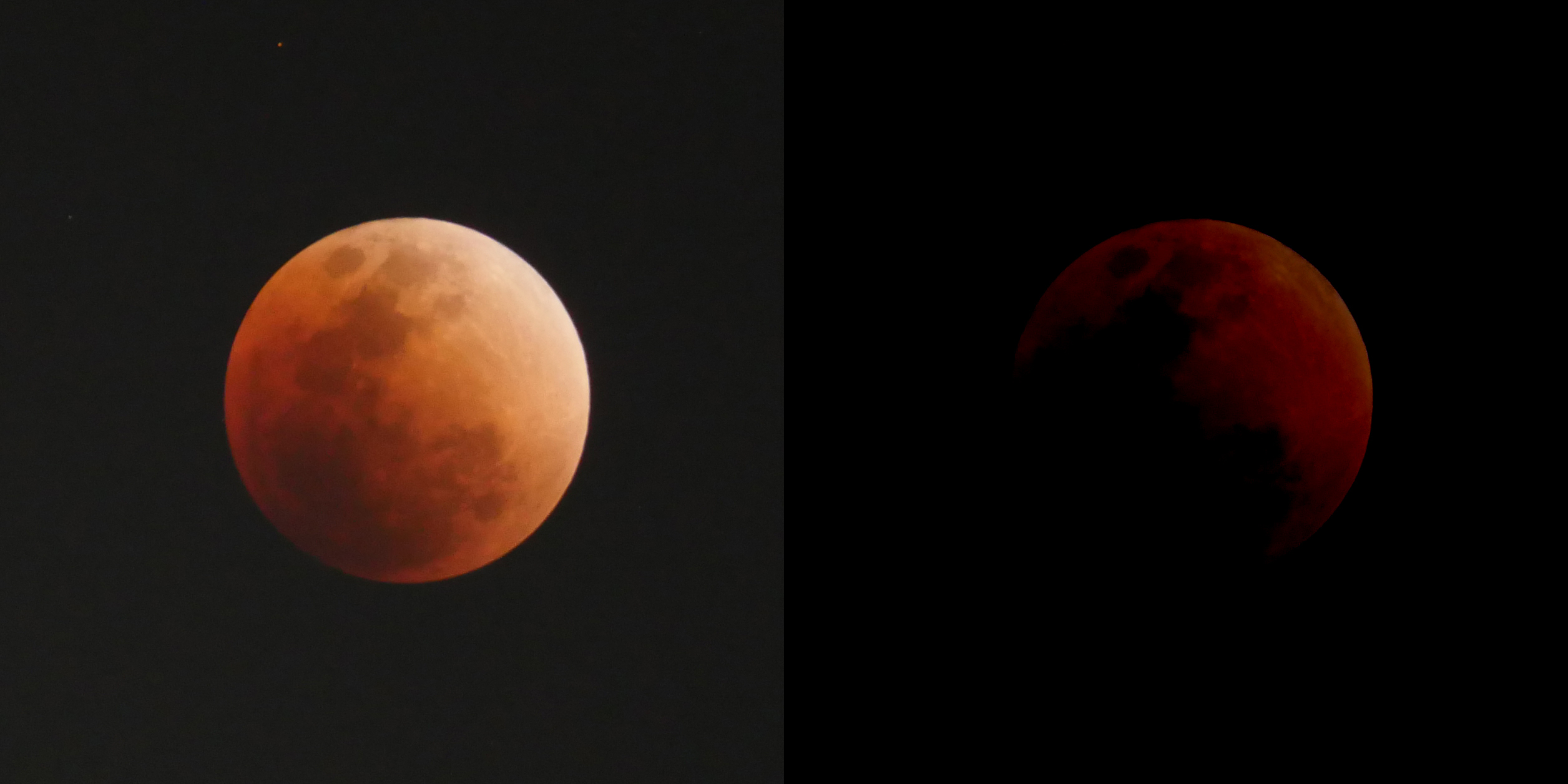
Chiang Mai, Thailand, 12:57 UTC

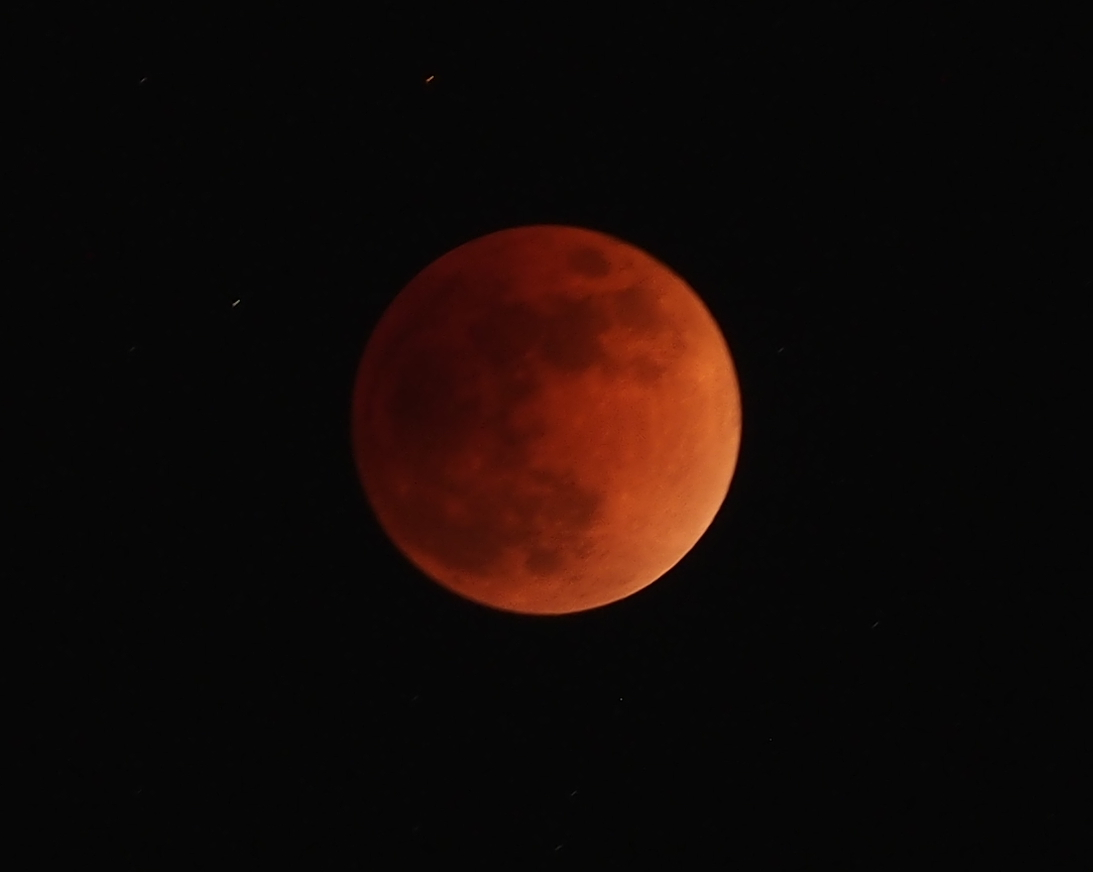
Chōfu, Tokyo, 13:22 UTC

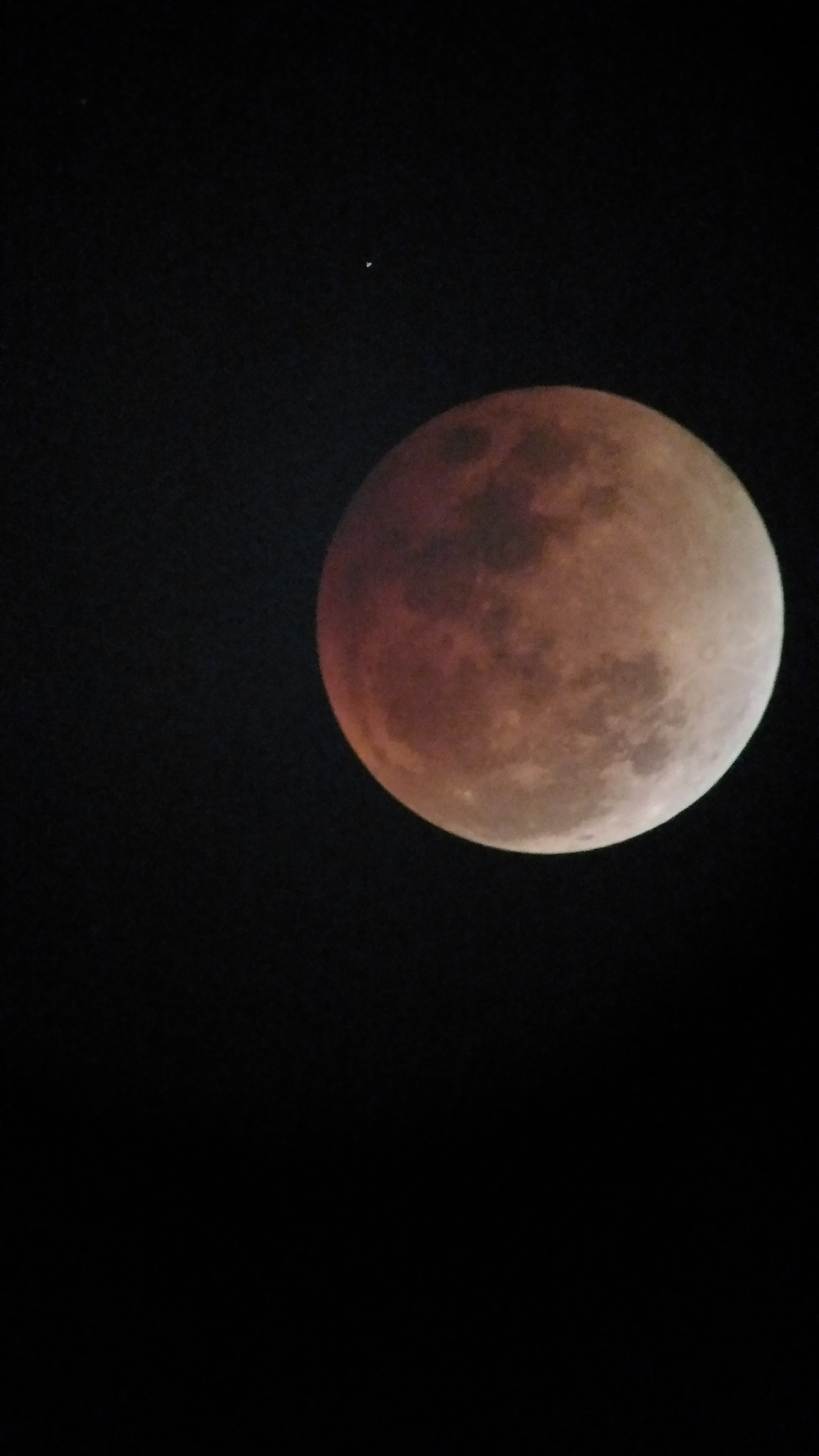
Guangzhou, China, 13:50 UTC

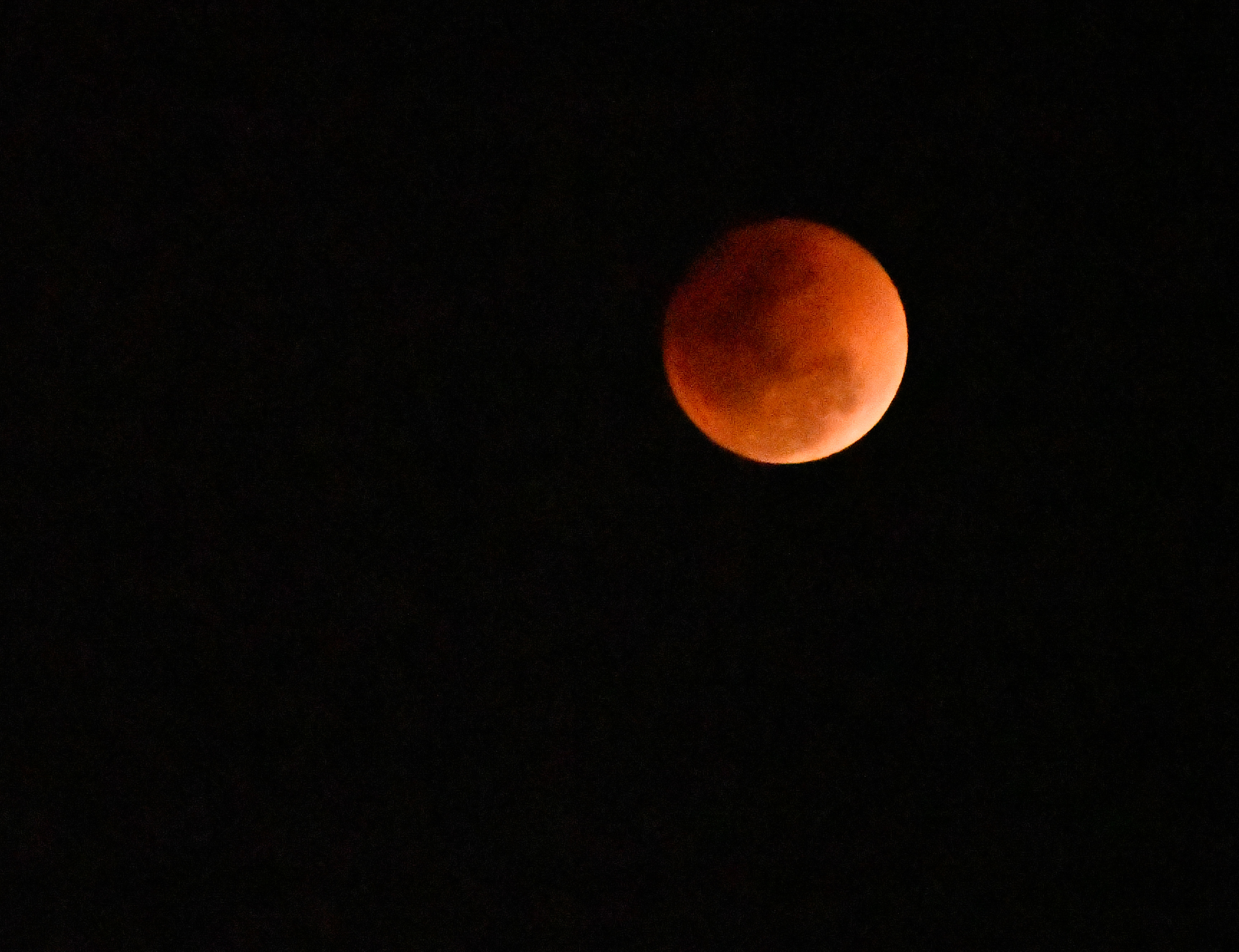
Kerala, India, 14:03 UTC

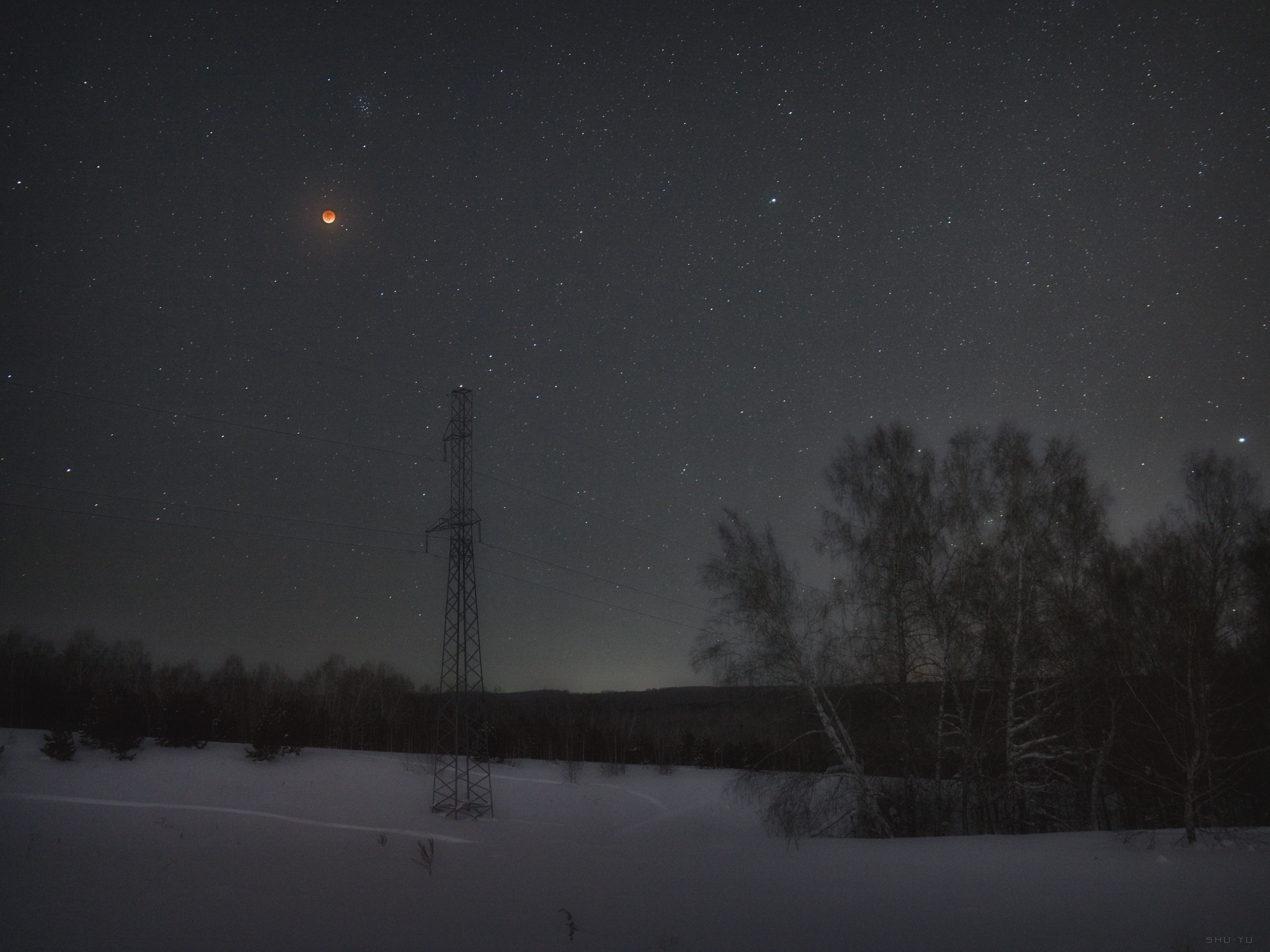
Novosibirsk, Russia, 14:06 UTC

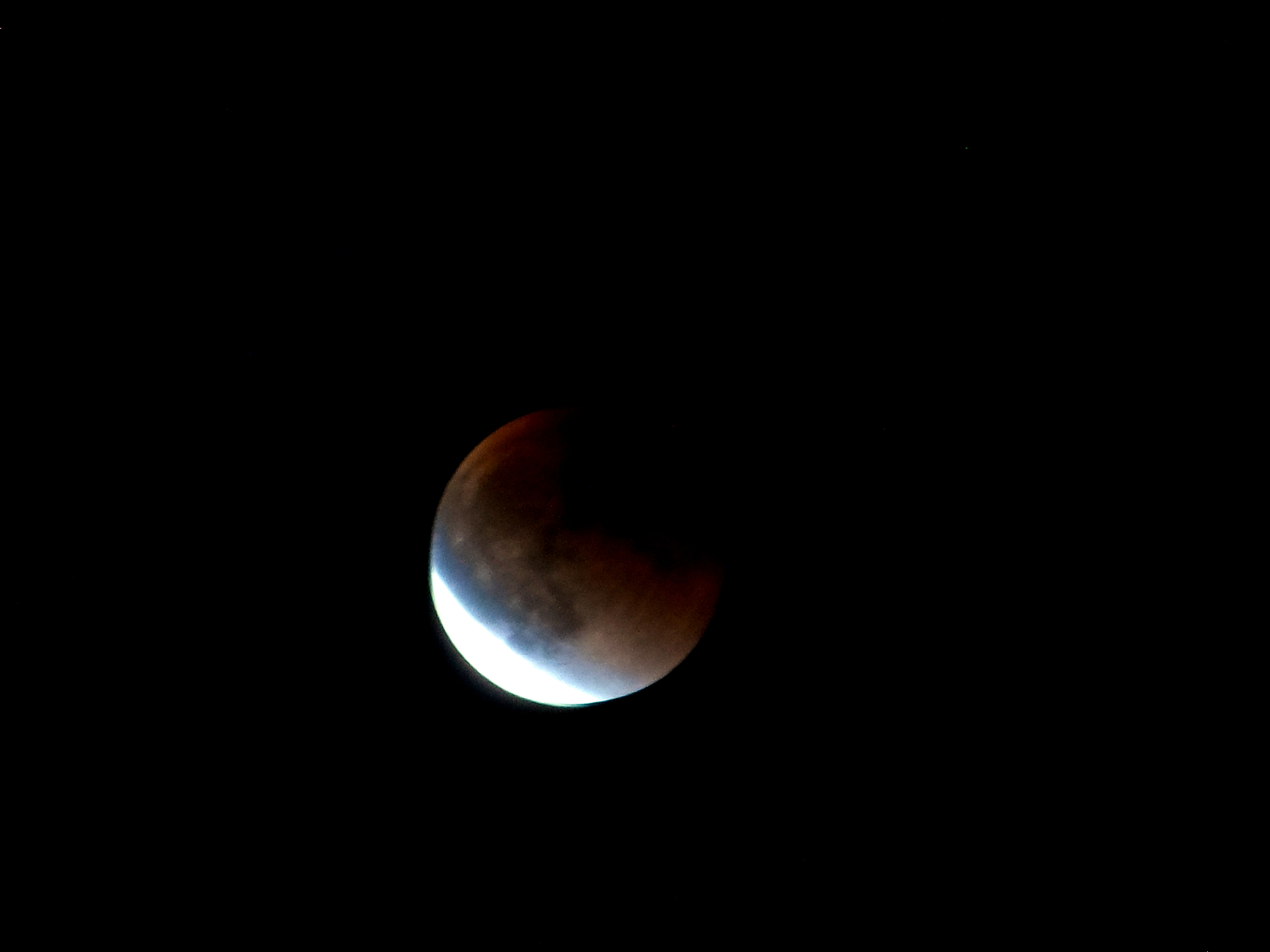
George Town, Malaysia, 14:16 UTC

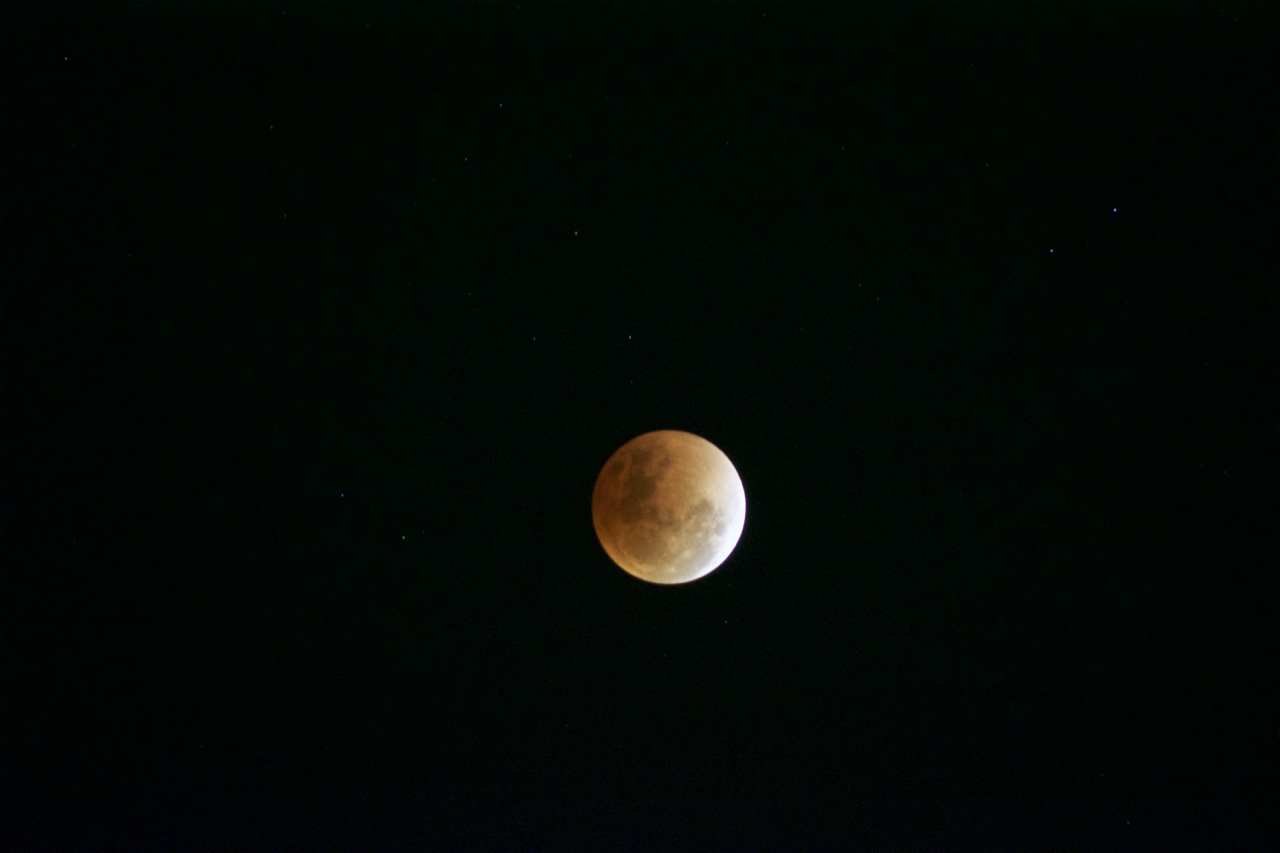
Singapore, 14:32 UTC

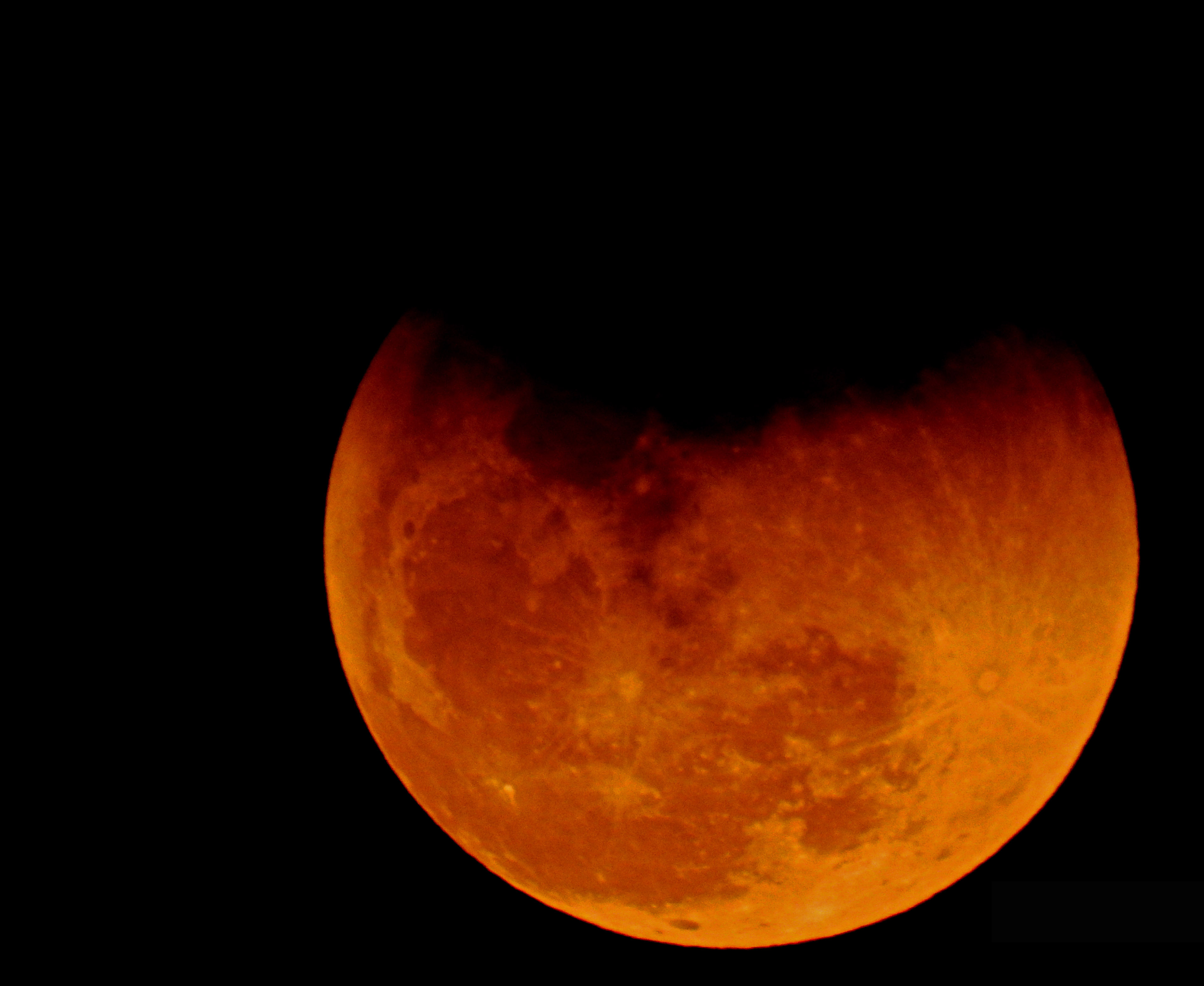
From Kuwait at moonrise, 15:03 UTC

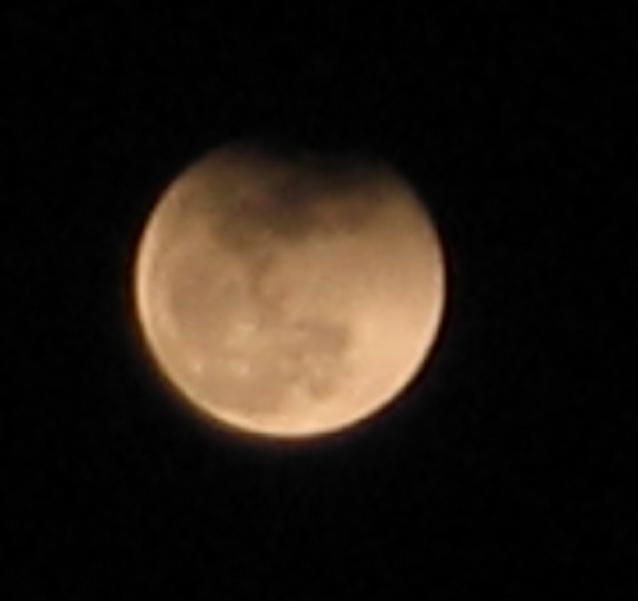
Nanjing, China, 15:10 UTC

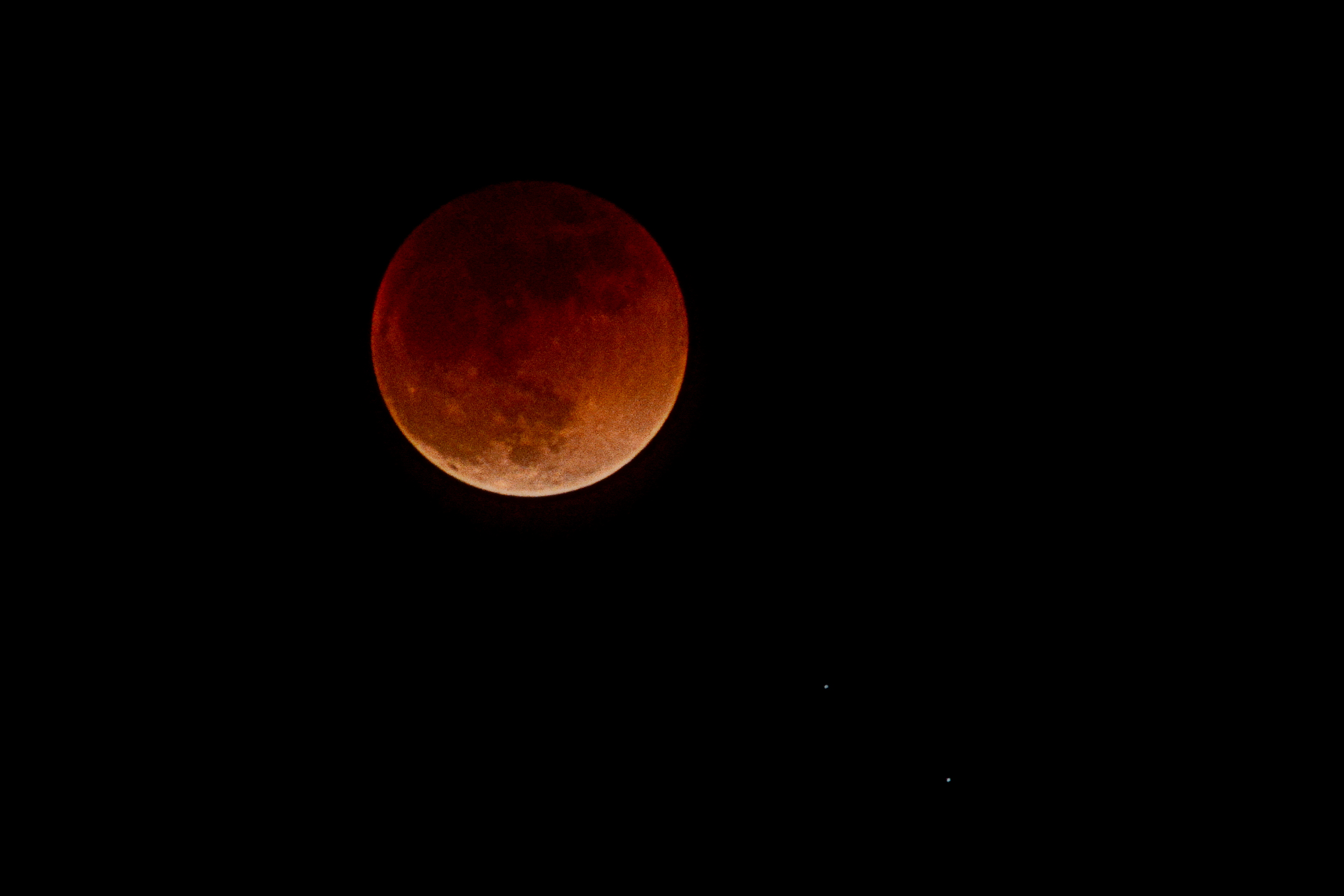
From Russian Far East

=== Oceania ===
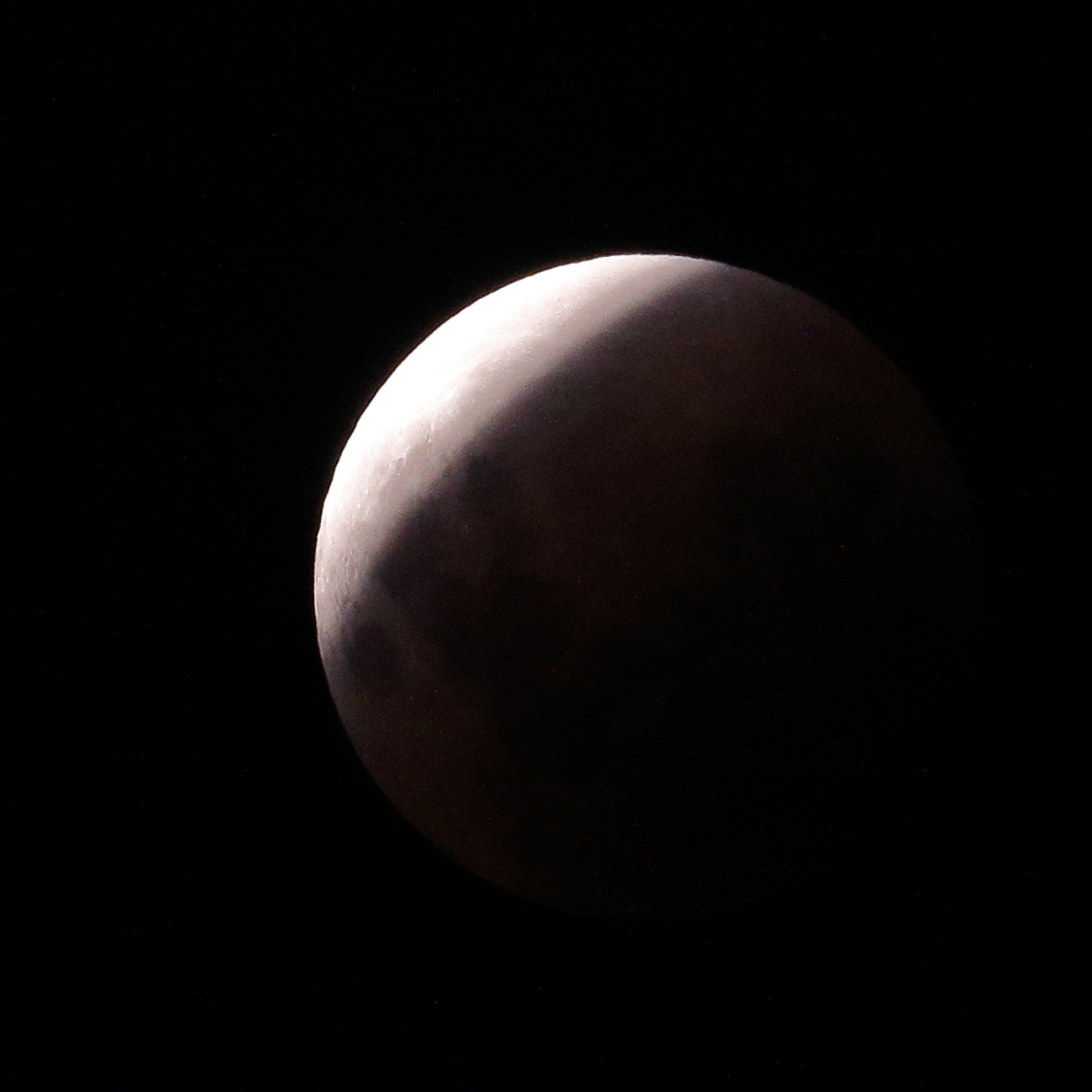
Lake Wendouree, Victoria, 12:40 UTC

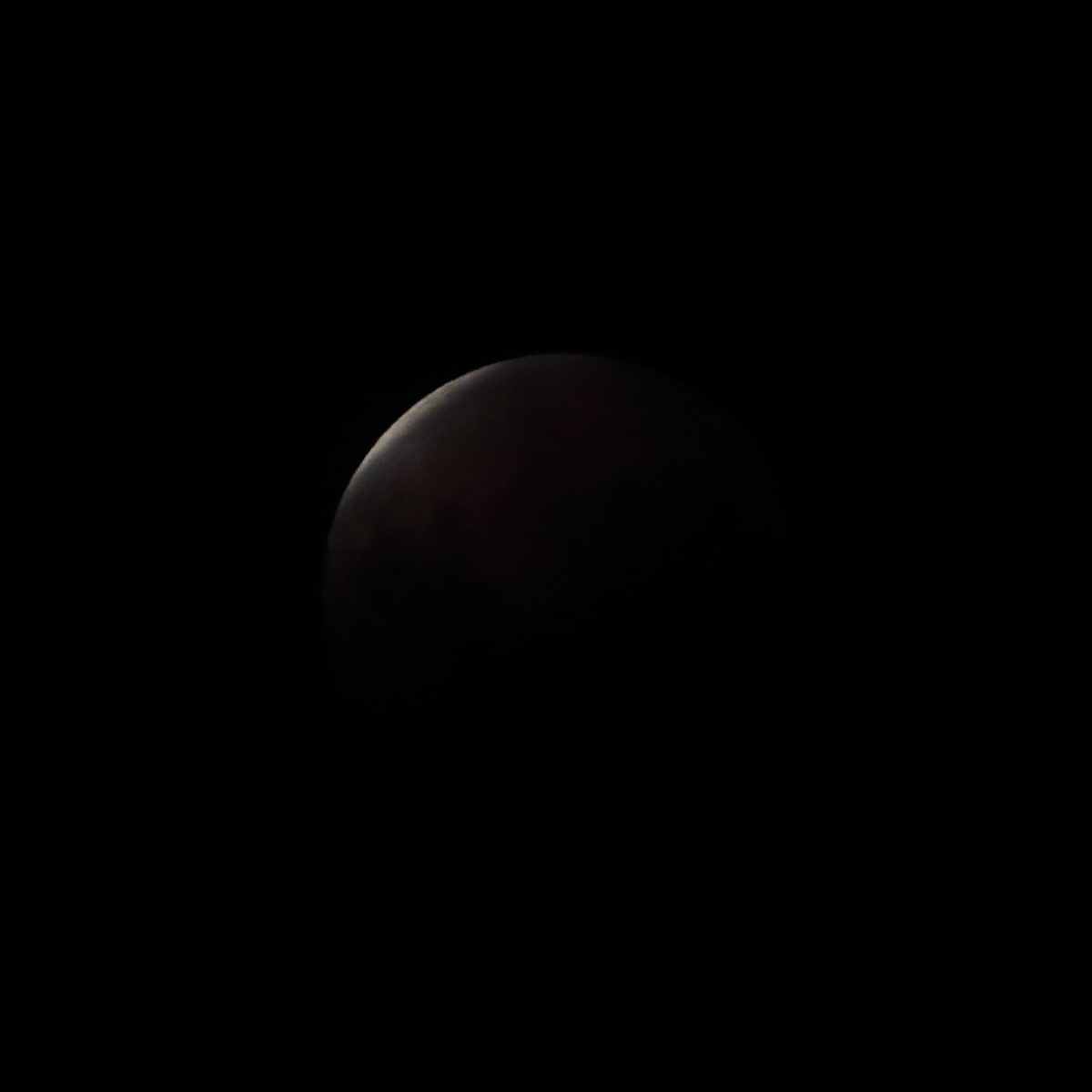
Sydney, Australia, 12:49 UTC

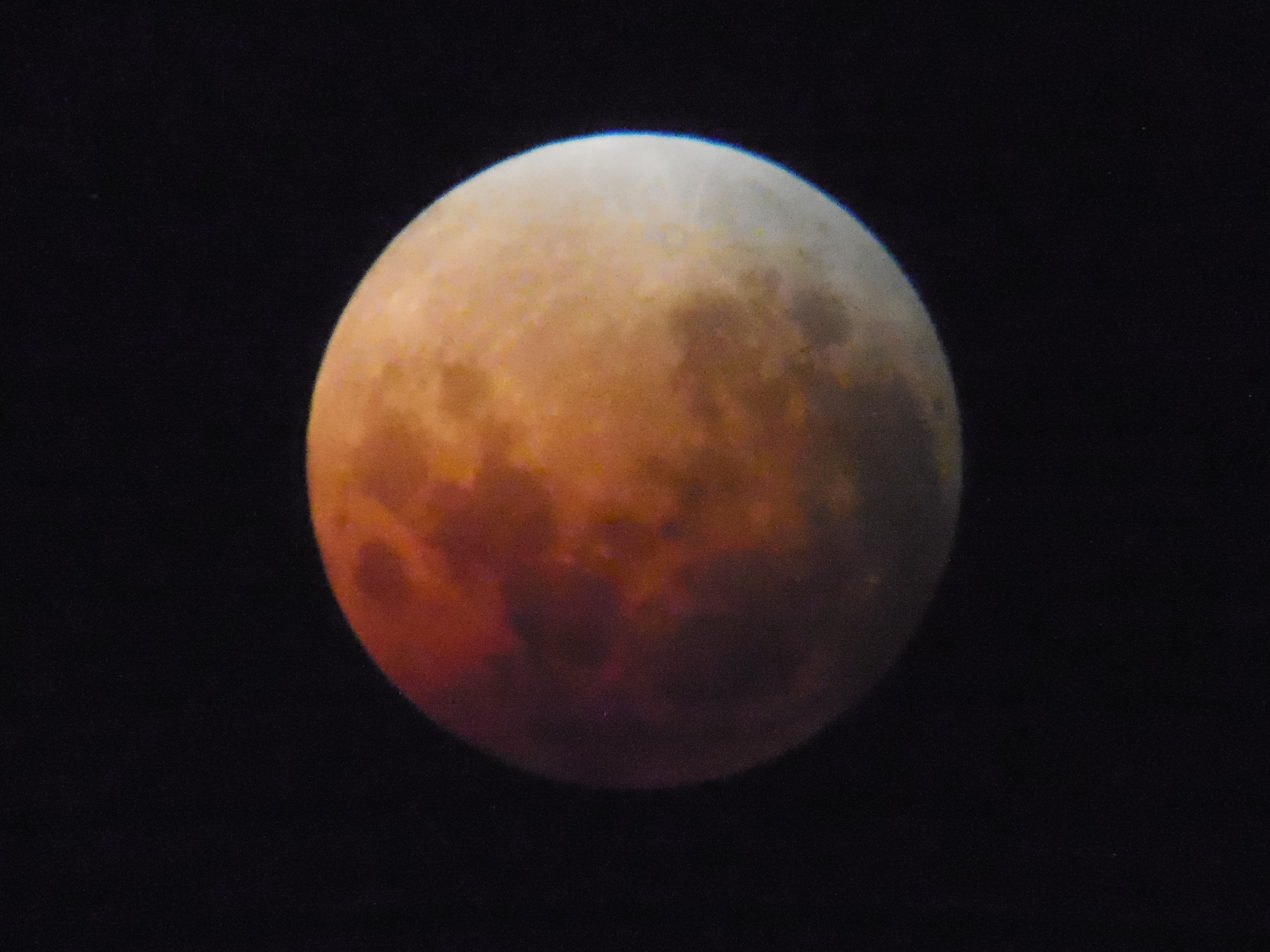
Chelsea, Victoria, 13:44 UTC

== Eclipse details ==
Shown below is a table displaying details about this particular lunar eclipse. It describes various parameters pertaining to this eclipse.

January 31, 2018 Lunar Eclipse Parameters
Parameter	Value
Penumbral Magnitude	2.29538
Umbral Magnitude	1.31671
Gamma	−0.30143
Sun Right Ascension	20h56m18.8s
Sun Declination	-17°17'47.0"
Sun Semi-Diameter	16'14.0"
Sun Equatorial Horizontal Parallax	08.9"
Moon Right Ascension	08h56m05.0s
Moon Declination	+16°59'44.2"
Moon Semi-Diameter	16'35.2"
Moon Equatorial Horizontal Parallax	1°00'52.6"
ΔT	68.8 s

== Eclipse season ==
This eclipse is part of an eclipse season, a period, roughly every six months, when eclipses occur. Only two (or occasionally three) eclipse seasons occur each year, and each season lasts about 35 days and repeats just short of six months (173 days) later; thus two full eclipse seasons always occur each year. Either two or three eclipses happen each eclipse season. In the sequence below, each eclipse is separated by a fortnight.

Eclipse season of January–February 2018
January 31 Ascending node (full moon)	February 15 Descending node (new moon)
Total lunar eclipse Lunar Saros 124	Partial solar eclipse Solar Saros 150

== Related eclipses ==
=== Eclipses in 2018 ===
- A total lunar eclipse on January 31.
- A partial solar eclipse on February 15.
- A partial solar eclipse on July 13.
- A total lunar eclipse on July 27.
- A partial solar eclipse on August 11.

=== Metonic ===
- Preceded by: Lunar eclipse of April 15, 2014
- Followed by: Lunar eclipse of November 19, 2021

=== Tzolkinex ===
- Preceded by: Lunar eclipse of December 21, 2010
- Followed by: Lunar eclipse of March 14, 2025

=== Half-Saros ===
- Preceded by: Solar eclipse of January 26, 2009
- Followed by: Solar eclipse of February 6, 2027

=== Tritos ===
- Preceded by: Lunar eclipse of March 3, 2007
- Followed by: Lunar eclipse of December 31, 2028

=== Lunar Saros 124 ===
- Preceded by: Lunar eclipse of January 21, 2000
- Followed by: Lunar eclipse of February 11, 2036

=== Inex ===
- Preceded by: Lunar eclipse of February 20, 1989
- Followed by: Lunar eclipse of January 12, 2047

=== Triad ===
- Preceded by: Lunar eclipse of April 2, 1931
- Followed by: Lunar eclipse of December 2, 2104

=== Lunar eclipses of 2016–2020 ===
This eclipse is a member of a semester series. An eclipse in a semester series of lunar eclipses repeats approximately every 177 days and 4 hours (a semester) at alternating nodes of the Moon's orbit.

The penumbral lunar eclipses on March 23, 2016 and September 16, 2016 occur in the previous lunar year eclipse set, and the penumbral lunar eclipses on June 5, 2020 and November 30, 2020 occur in the next lunar year eclipse set.

Lunar eclipse series sets from 2016 to 2020
Descending node				Ascending node			
Saros	Date Viewing	Type Chart	Gamma	Saros	Date Viewing	Type Chart	Gamma
109	2016 Aug 18	Penumbral	1.5641	114	2017 Feb 11	Penumbral	−1.0255
119	2017 Aug 07	Partial	0.8669	124	2018 Jan 31	Total	−0.3014
129	2018 Jul 27	Total	0.1168	134	2019 Jan 21	Total	0.3684
139	2019 Jul 16	Partial	−0.6430	144	2020 Jan 10	Penumbral	1.0727
149	2020 Jul 05	Penumbral	−1.3639				

=== Saros 124 ===
This eclipse is a part of Saros series 124, repeating every 18 years, 11 days, and containing 73 events. The series started with a penumbral lunar eclipse on August 17, 1152. It contains partial eclipses from March 21, 1513 through June 15, 1639; total eclipses from June 25, 1657 through April 18, 2144; and a second set of partial eclipses from April 29, 2162 through July 14, 2288. The series ends at member 73 as a penumbral eclipse on October 21, 2450.

The longest duration of totality was produced by member 39 at 101 minutes, 27 seconds on August 30, 1765. All eclipses in this series occur at the Moon’s ascending node of orbit.

Greatest	First			
The greatest eclipse of the series occurred on 1765 Aug 30, lasting 101 minutes, 27 seconds.	Penumbral	Partial	Total	Central
The greatest eclipse of the series occurred on 1765 Aug 30, lasting 101 minutes, 27 seconds.	1152 Aug 17	1513 Mar 21	1657 Jun 25	1711 Jul 29
The greatest eclipse of the series occurred on 1765 Aug 30, lasting 101 minutes, 27 seconds.	Last			
The greatest eclipse of the series occurred on 1765 Aug 30, lasting 101 minutes, 27 seconds.	Central	Total	Partial	Penumbral
The greatest eclipse of the series occurred on 1765 Aug 30, lasting 101 minutes, 27 seconds.	1909 Nov 27	2144 Apr 18	2288 Jul 14	2450 Oct 21

Eclipses are tabulated in three columns; every third eclipse in the same column is one exeligmos apart, so they all cast shadows over approximately the same parts of the Earth.

Series members 37–59 occur between 1801 and 2200:
37	38	39
1801 Sep 22	1819 Oct 03	1837 Oct 13
40	41	42
1855 Oct 25	1873 Nov 04	1891 Nov 16
43	44	45
1909 Nov 27	1927 Dec 08	1945 Dec 19
46	47	48
1963 Dec 30	1982 Jan 09	2000 Jan 21
49	50	51
2018 Jan 31	2036 Feb 11	2054 Feb 22
52	53	54
2072 Mar 04	2090 Mar 15	2108 Mar 27
55	56	57
2126 Apr 07	2144 Apr 18	2162 Apr 29
58	59	
2180 May 09	2198 May 20	

=== Tritos series ===
This eclipse is a part of a tritos cycle, repeating at alternating nodes every 135 synodic months (≈ 3986.63 days, or 11 years minus 1 month). Their appearance and longitude are irregular due to a lack of synchronization with the anomalistic month (period of perigee), but groupings of 3 tritos cycles (≈ 33 years minus 3 months) come close (≈ 434.044 anomalistic months), so eclipses are similar in these groupings.

Series members between 1801 and 2200
1810 Sep 13 (Saros 105)	1821 Aug 13 (Saros 106)	1832 Jul 12 (Saros 107)	1843 Jun 12 (Saros 108)	1854 May 12 (Saros 109)
1865 Apr 11 (Saros 110)	1876 Mar 10 (Saros 111)	1887 Feb 08 (Saros 112)	1898 Jan 08 (Saros 113)	1908 Dec 07 (Saros 114)
1919 Nov 07 (Saros 115)	1930 Oct 07 (Saros 116)	1941 Sep 05 (Saros 117)	1952 Aug 05 (Saros 118)	1963 Jul 06 (Saros 119)
1974 Jun 04 (Saros 120)	1985 May 04 (Saros 121)	1996 Apr 04 (Saros 122)	2007 Mar 03 (Saros 123)	2018 Jan 31 (Saros 124)
2028 Dec 31 (Saros 125)	2039 Nov 30 (Saros 126)	2050 Oct 30 (Saros 127)	2061 Sep 29 (Saros 128)	2072 Aug 28 (Saros 129)
2083 Jul 29 (Saros 130)	2094 Jun 28 (Saros 131)	2105 May 28 (Saros 132)	2116 Apr 27 (Saros 133)	2127 Mar 28 (Saros 134)
2138 Feb 24 (Saros 135)	2149 Jan 23 (Saros 136)	2159 Dec 24 (Saros 137)	2170 Nov 23 (Saros 138)	2181 Oct 22 (Saros 139)
2192 Sep 21 (Saros 140)

=== Inex series ===
This eclipse is a part of the long period inex cycle, repeating at alternating nodes, every 358 synodic months (≈ 10,571.95 days, or 29 years minus 20 days). Their appearance and longitude are irregular due to a lack of synchronization with the anomalistic month (period of perigee). However, groupings of 3 inex cycles (≈ 87 years minus 2 months) comes close (≈ 1,151.02 anomalistic months), so eclipses are similar in these groupings.

Series members between 1801 and 2200
1815 Jun 21 (Saros 117)	1844 May 31 (Saros 118)	1873 May 12 (Saros 119)
1902 Apr 22 (Saros 120)	1931 Apr 02 (Saros 121)	1960 Mar 13 (Saros 122)
1989 Feb 20 (Saros 123)	2018 Jan 31 (Saros 124)	2047 Jan 12 (Saros 125)
2075 Dec 22 (Saros 126)	2104 Dec 02 (Saros 127)	2133 Nov 12 (Saros 128)
2162 Oct 23 (Saros 129)	2191 Oct 02 (Saros 130)	

=== Half-Saros cycle ===
A lunar eclipse will be preceded and followed by solar eclipses by 9 years and 5.5 days (a half saros). This lunar eclipse is related to two annular solar eclipses of Solar Saros 131.

January 26, 2009	February 6, 2027

== See also ==
- List of lunar eclipses
- List of 21st-century lunar eclipses
