= March 1941 lunar eclipse =

Partial lunar eclipse March 13, 1941

- Partial eclipse
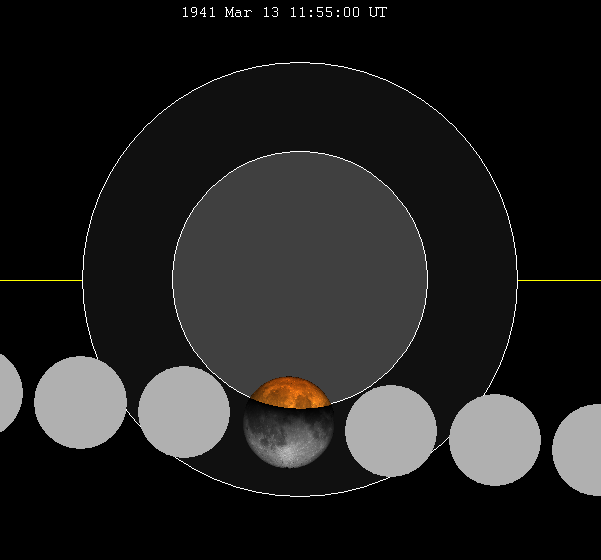
- The Moon's hourly motion shown right to left
- Date: March 13, 1941
- Gamma: −0.8437
- Magnitude: 0.3226
- Saros cycle: 112 (61 of 72)
- Partiality: 119 minutes, 46 seconds
- Penumbral: 272 minutes, 11 seconds
Contacts (UTC)
- P1: 9:39:18
- U1: 10:55:32
- Greatest: 11:55:22
- U4: 12:55:18
- P4: 14:11:29

A partial lunar eclipse occurred at the Moon’s ascending node of orbit on Thursday, March 13, 1941, with an umbral magnitude of 0.3226. A lunar eclipse occurs when the Moon moves into the Earth's shadow, causing the Moon to be darkened. A partial lunar eclipse occurs when one part of the Moon is in the Earth's umbra, while the other part is in the Earth's penumbra. Unlike a solar eclipse, which can only be viewed from a relatively small area of the world, a lunar eclipse may be viewed from anywhere on the night side of Earth. Occurring about 1.5 days before perigee (on March 14, 1941, at 23:05 UTC), the Moon's apparent diameter was larger.

== Visibility ==
The eclipse was completely visible over northeast Asia, eastern Australia, and western North America, seen rising over much of Asia and western Australia and setting over much of North and South America.

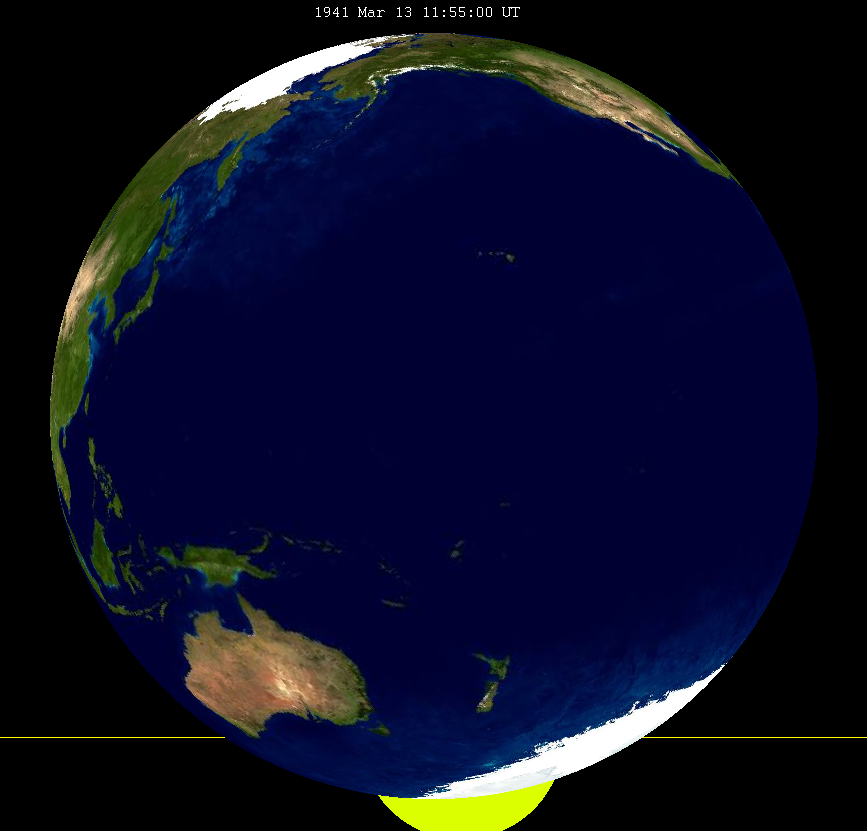
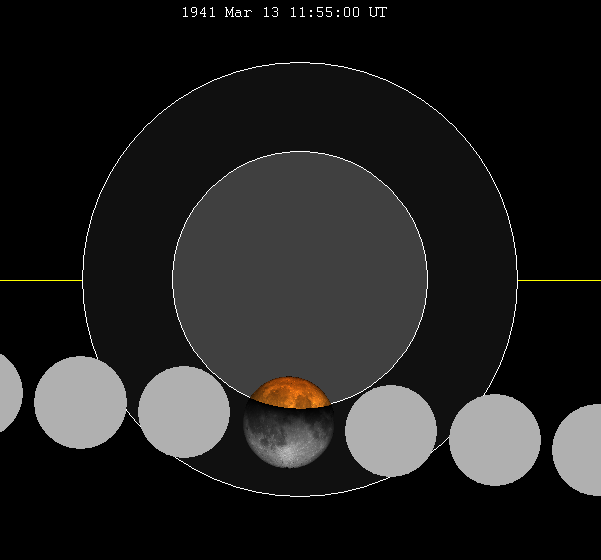

== Eclipse details ==
Shown below is a table displaying details about this particular solar eclipse. It describes various parameters pertaining to this eclipse.

March 13, 1941 Lunar Eclipse Parameters
Parameter	Value
Penumbral Magnitude	1.29706
Umbral Magnitude	0.32264
Gamma	−0.84368
Sun Right Ascension	23h32m32.0s
Sun Declination	-02°58'04.6"
Sun Semi-Diameter	16'05.3"
Sun Equatorial Horizontal Parallax	08.8"
Moon Right Ascension	11h31m29.9s
Moon Declination	+02°09'22.2"
Moon Semi-Diameter	16'30.6"
Moon Equatorial Horizontal Parallax	1°00'35.5"
ΔT	24.9 s

== Eclipse season ==
This eclipse is part of an eclipse season, a period, roughly every six months, when eclipses occur. Only two (or occasionally three) eclipse seasons occur each year, and each season lasts about 35 days and repeats just short of six months (173 days) later; thus two full eclipse seasons always occur each year. Either two or three eclipses happen each eclipse season. In the sequence below, each eclipse is separated by a fortnight.

Eclipse season of March 1941
March 13 Ascending node (full moon)	March 27 Descending node (new moon)
Partial lunar eclipse Lunar Saros 112	Annular solar eclipse Solar Saros 138

== Related eclipses ==
=== Eclipses in 1941 ===
- A partial lunar eclipse on March 13.
- An annular solar eclipse on March 27.
- A partial lunar eclipse on September 5.
- A total solar eclipse on September 21.

=== Metonic ===
- Preceded by: Lunar eclipse of May 25, 1937
- Followed by: Lunar eclipse of December 29, 1944

=== Tzolkinex ===
- Preceded by: Lunar eclipse of January 30, 1934
- Followed by: Lunar eclipse of April 23, 1948

=== Half-Saros ===
- Preceded by: Solar eclipse of March 7, 1932
- Followed by: Solar eclipse of March 18, 1950

=== Tritos ===
- Preceded by: Lunar eclipse of April 13, 1930
- Followed by: Lunar eclipse of February 11, 1952

=== Lunar Saros 112 ===
- Preceded by: Lunar eclipse of March 3, 1923
- Followed by: Lunar eclipse of March 24, 1959

=== Inex ===
- Preceded by: Lunar eclipse of April 1, 1912
- Followed by: Lunar eclipse of February 21, 1970

=== Triad ===
- Preceded by: Lunar eclipse of May 12, 1854
- Followed by: Lunar eclipse of January 12, 2028

=== Lunar eclipses of 1940–1944 ===
This eclipse is a member of a semester series. An eclipse in a semester series of lunar eclipses repeats approximately every 177 days and 4 hours (a semester) at alternating nodes of the Moon's orbit.

The penumbral lunar eclipses on April 22, 1940 and October 16, 1940 occur in the previous lunar year eclipse set, and the penumbral lunar eclipses on July 6, 1944 and December 29, 1944 occur in the next lunar year eclipse set.

Lunar eclipse series sets from 1940 to 1944
Ascending node				Descending node			
Saros	Date Viewing	Type Chart	Gamma	Saros	Date Viewing	Type Chart	Gamma
102	1940 Mar 23	Penumbral	−1.5034	107			
112	1941 Mar 13	Partial	−0.8437	117	1941 Sep 05	Partial	0.9747
122	1942 Mar 03	Total	−0.1545	127	1942 Aug 26	Total	0.1818
132	1943 Feb 20	Partial	0.5752	137	1943 Aug 15	Partial	−0.5534
142	1944 Feb 09	Penumbral	1.2698	147	1944 Aug 04	Penumbral	−1.2843

=== Saros 112 ===
This eclipse is a part of Saros series 112, repeating every 18 years, 11 days, and containing 72 events. The series started with a penumbral lunar eclipse on May 20, 859 AD. It contains partial eclipses from August 3, 985 AD through March 8, 1346; total eclipses from March 18, 1364 through August 27, 1616; and a second set of partial eclipses from September 7, 1634 through April 25, 2013. The series ends at member 72 as a penumbral eclipse on July 12, 2139.

The longest duration of totality was produced by member 36 at 99 minutes, 51 seconds on June 2, 1490. All eclipses in this series occur at the Moon’s ascending node of orbit.

Greatest	First			
The greatest eclipse of the series occurred on 1490 Jun 02, lasting 99 minutes, 51 seconds.	Penumbral	Partial	Total	Central
The greatest eclipse of the series occurred on 1490 Jun 02, lasting 99 minutes, 51 seconds.	859 May 20	985 Aug 03	1364 Mar 18	1436 Apr 30
The greatest eclipse of the series occurred on 1490 Jun 02, lasting 99 minutes, 51 seconds.	Last			
The greatest eclipse of the series occurred on 1490 Jun 02, lasting 99 minutes, 51 seconds.	Central	Total	Partial	Penumbral
The greatest eclipse of the series occurred on 1490 Jun 02, lasting 99 minutes, 51 seconds.	1562 Jul 16	1616 Aug 27	2013 Apr 25	2139 Jul 12

Eclipses are tabulated in three columns; every third eclipse in the same column is one exeligmos apart, so they all cast shadows over approximately the same parts of the Earth.

Series members 54–72 occur between 1801 and 2139:
54	55	56
1814 Dec 26	1833 Jan 06	1851 Jan 17
57	58	59
1869 Jan 28	1887 Feb 08	1905 Feb 19
60	61	62
1923 Mar 03	1941 Mar 13	1959 Mar 24
63	64	65
1977 Apr 04	1995 Apr 15	2013 Apr 25
66	67	68
2031 May 07	2049 May 17	2067 May 28
69	70	71
2085 Jun 08	2103 Jun 20	2121 Jun 30
72
2139 Jul 12

=== Tritos series ===
This eclipse is a part of a tritos cycle, repeating at alternating nodes every 135 synodic months (≈ 3986.63 days, or 11 years minus 1 month). Their appearance and longitude are irregular due to a lack of synchronization with the anomalistic month (period of perigee), but groupings of 3 tritos cycles (≈ 33 years minus 3 months) come close (≈ 434.044 anomalistic months), so eclipses are similar in these groupings.

Series members between 1801 and 2200
1810 Mar 21 (Saros 100)	1821 Feb 17 (Saros 101)	1832 Jan 17 (Saros 102)	1842 Dec 17 (Saros 103)	
1864 Oct 15 (Saros 105)	1875 Sep 15 (Saros 106)	1886 Aug 14 (Saros 107)	1897 Jul 14 (Saros 108)	1908 Jun 14 (Saros 109)
1919 May 15 (Saros 110)	1930 Apr 13 (Saros 111)	1941 Mar 13 (Saros 112)	1952 Feb 11 (Saros 113)	1963 Jan 09 (Saros 114)
1973 Dec 10 (Saros 115)	1984 Nov 08 (Saros 116)	1995 Oct 08 (Saros 117)	2006 Sep 07 (Saros 118)	2017 Aug 07 (Saros 119)
2028 Jul 06 (Saros 120)	2039 Jun 06 (Saros 121)	2050 May 06 (Saros 122)	2061 Apr 04 (Saros 123)	2072 Mar 04 (Saros 124)
2083 Feb 02 (Saros 125)	2094 Jan 01 (Saros 126)	2104 Dec 02 (Saros 127)	2115 Nov 02 (Saros 128)	2126 Oct 01 (Saros 129)
2137 Aug 30 (Saros 130)	2148 Jul 31 (Saros 131)	2159 Jun 30 (Saros 132)	2170 May 30 (Saros 133)	2181 Apr 29 (Saros 134)
2192 Mar 28 (Saros 135)

=== Inex series ===
This eclipse is a part of the long period inex cycle, repeating at alternating nodes, every 358 synodic months (≈ 10,571.95 days, or 29 years minus 20 days). Their appearance and longitude are irregular due to a lack of synchronization with the anomalistic month (period of perigee). However, groupings of 3 inex cycles (≈ 87 years minus 2 months) comes close (≈ 1,151.02 anomalistic months), so eclipses are similar in these groupings.

Series members between 1801 and 2200
1825 Jun 01 (Saros 108)	1854 May 12 (Saros 109)	1883 Apr 22 (Saros 110)
1912 Apr 01 (Saros 111)	1941 Mar 13 (Saros 112)	1970 Feb 21 (Saros 113)
1999 Jan 31 (Saros 114)	2028 Jan 12 (Saros 115)	2056 Dec 22 (Saros 116)
2085 Dec 01 (Saros 117)	2114 Nov 12 (Saros 118)	2143 Oct 23 (Saros 119)
2172 Oct 02 (Saros 120)

=== Half-Saros cycle ===
A lunar eclipse will be preceded and followed by solar eclipses by 9 years and 5.5 days (a half saros). This lunar eclipse is related to two annular solar eclipses of Solar Saros 119.

March 7, 1932	March 18, 1950

== See also ==
- List of lunar eclipses and List of 21st-century lunar eclipses
