= March 1959 lunar eclipse =

Partial lunar eclipse March 24, 1959

- Partial eclipse
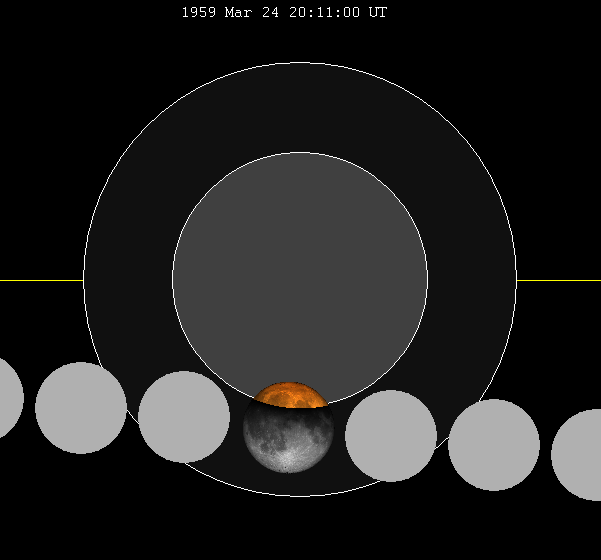
- The Moon's hourly motion shown right to left
- Date: March 24, 1959
- Gamma: −0.8757
- Magnitude: 0.2643
- Saros cycle: 112 (62 of 72)
- Partiality: 109 minutes, 32 seconds
- Penumbral: 268 minutes, 11 seconds
Contacts (UTC)
- P1: 17:57:20
- U1: 19:16:42
- Greatest: 20:11:24
- U4: 21:06:14
- P4: 22:25:31

A partial lunar eclipse occurred at the Moon’s ascending node of orbit on Tuesday, March 24, 1959, with an umbral magnitude of 0.2643. A lunar eclipse occurs when the Moon moves into the Earth's shadow, causing the Moon to be darkened. A partial lunar eclipse occurs when one part of the Moon is in the Earth's umbra, while the other part is in the Earth's penumbra. Unlike a solar eclipse, which can only be viewed from a relatively small area of the world, a lunar eclipse may be viewed from anywhere on the night side of Earth. Occurring about 1.5 days before perigee (on March 26, 1959, at 9:25 UTC), the Moon's apparent diameter was larger.

== Visibility ==
The eclipse was completely visible over much of Africa, Europe, and Asia, seen rising over eastern South America, west Africa, and western Europe and setting over northeast Asia and Australia.

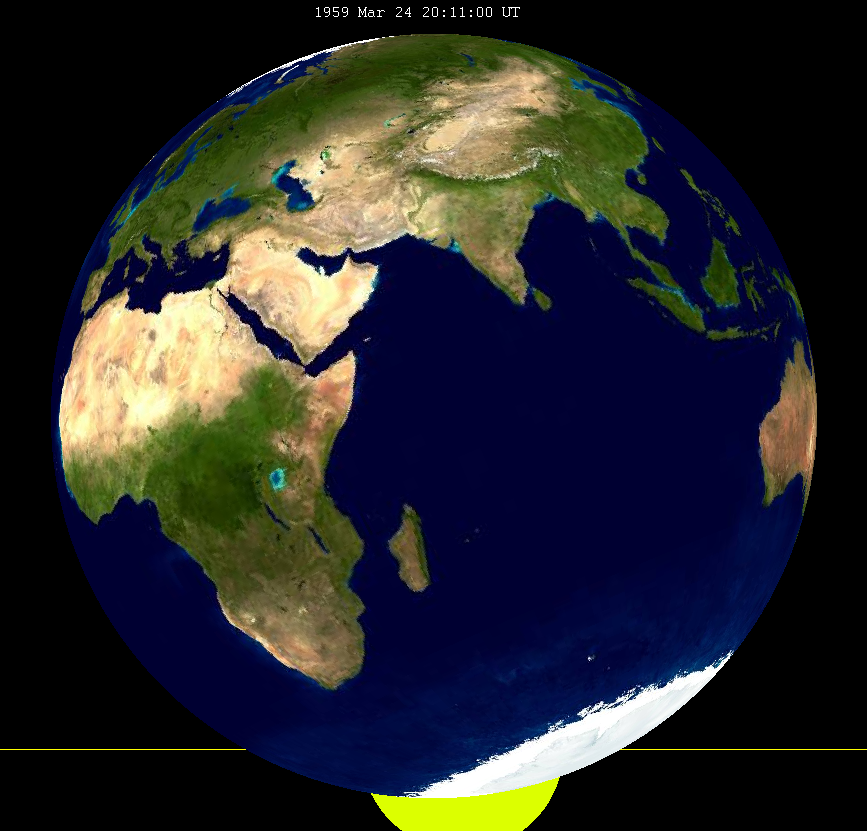
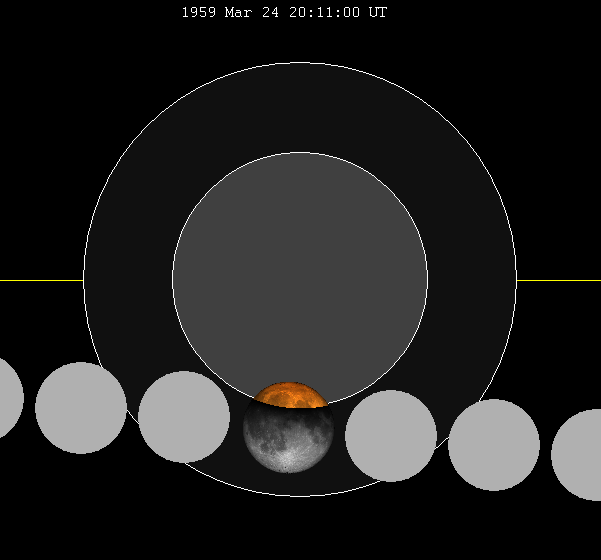

== Eclipse details ==
Shown below is a table displaying details about this particular solar eclipse. It describes various parameters pertaining to this eclipse.

March 24, 1959 Lunar Eclipse Parameters
| Parameter | Value |
|---|---|
| Penumbral Magnitude | 1.23788 |
| Umbral Magnitude | 0.26428 |
| Gamma | −0.87571 |
| Sun Right Ascension | 00h12m37.9s |
| Sun Declination | +01°22'05.8" |
| Sun Semi-Diameter | 16'02.4" |
| Sun Equatorial Horizontal Parallax | 08.8" |
| Moon Right Ascension | 12h11m33.0s |
| Moon Declination | -02°12'30.0" |
| Moon Semi-Diameter | 16'28.5" |
| Moon Equatorial Horizontal Parallax | 1°00'27.8" |
| ΔT | 32.8 s |

== Eclipse season ==
This eclipse is part of an eclipse season, a period, roughly every six months, when eclipses occur. Only two (or occasionally three) eclipse seasons occur each year, and each season lasts about 35 days and repeats just short of six months (173 days) later; thus two full eclipse seasons always occur each year. Either two or three eclipses happen each eclipse season. In the sequence below, each eclipse is separated by a fortnight.

Eclipse season of March–April 1959
| March 24 Ascending node (full moon) | April 8 Descending node (new moon) |
|---|---|
| Partial lunar eclipse Lunar Saros 112 | Annular solar eclipse Solar Saros 138 |

== Related eclipses ==
=== Eclipses in 1959 ===
- A partial lunar eclipse on March 24.
- An annular solar eclipse on April 8.
- A penumbral lunar eclipse on September 17.
- A total solar eclipse on October 2.

=== Metonic ===
- Preceded by: Lunar eclipse of June 5, 1955
- Followed by: Lunar eclipse of January 9, 1963

=== Tzolkinex ===
- Preceded by: Lunar eclipse of February 11, 1952
- Followed by: Lunar eclipse of May 4, 1966

=== Half-Saros ===
- Preceded by: Solar eclipse of March 18, 1950
- Followed by: Solar eclipse of March 28, 1968

=== Tritos ===
- Preceded by: Lunar eclipse of April 23, 1948
- Followed by: Lunar eclipse of February 21, 1970

=== Lunar Saros 112 ===
- Preceded by: Lunar eclipse of March 13, 1941
- Followed by: Lunar eclipse of April 4, 1977

=== Inex ===
- Preceded by: Lunar eclipse of April 13, 1930
- Followed by: Lunar eclipse of March 3, 1988

=== Triad ===
- Preceded by: Lunar eclipse of May 22, 1872
- Followed by: Lunar eclipse of January 22, 2046

=== Lunar eclipses of 1958–1962 ===
This eclipse is a member of a semester series. An eclipse in a semester series of lunar eclipses repeats approximately every 177 days and 4 hours (a semester) at alternating nodes of the Moon's orbit.

The lunar eclipses on May 3, 1958 (partial) and October 28, 1958 (penumbral) occur in the previous lunar year eclipse set, and the penumbral lunar eclipse on July 17, 1962 occurs in the next lunar year eclipse set.

Lunar eclipse series sets from 1958 to 1962
| Ascending node | | | | Descending node | | | |
| Saros | Date Viewing | Type Chart | Gamma | Saros | Date Viewing | Type Chart | Gamma |
| 102 | 1958 Apr 04 | Penumbral | −1.5381 | | | | |
| 112 | 1959 Mar 24 | Partial | −0.8757 | 117 | 1959 Sep 17 | Penumbral | 1.0296 |
| 122 | 1960 Mar 13 | Total | −0.1799 | 127 | 1960 Sep 05 | Total | 0.2422 |
| 132 | 1961 Mar 02 | Partial | 0.5541 | 137 | 1961 Aug 26 | Partial | −0.4895 |
| 142 | 1962 Feb 19 | Penumbral | 1.2512 | 147 | 1962 Aug 15 | Penumbral | −1.2210 |

=== Saros 112 ===
This eclipse is a part of Saros series 112, repeating every 18 years, 11 days, and containing 72 events. The series started with a penumbral lunar eclipse on May 20, 859 AD. It contains partial eclipses from August 3, 985 AD through March 8, 1346; total eclipses from March 18, 1364 through August 27, 1616; and a second set of partial eclipses from September 7, 1634 through April 25, 2013. The series ends at member 72 as a penumbral eclipse on July 12, 2139.

The longest duration of totality was produced by member 36 at 99 minutes, 51 seconds on June 2, 1490. All eclipses in this series occur at the Moon’s ascending node of orbit.

| Greatest | First | | | |
|---|---|---|---|---|
| The greatest eclipse of the series occurred on 1490 Jun 02, lasting 99 minutes, 51 seconds. | Penumbral | Partial | Total | Central |
| The greatest eclipse of the series occurred on 1490 Jun 02, lasting 99 minutes, 51 seconds. | 859 May 20 | 985 Aug 03 | 1364 Mar 18 | 1436 Apr 30 |
| The greatest eclipse of the series occurred on 1490 Jun 02, lasting 99 minutes, 51 seconds. | Last | | | |
| The greatest eclipse of the series occurred on 1490 Jun 02, lasting 99 minutes, 51 seconds. | Central | Total | Partial | Penumbral |
| The greatest eclipse of the series occurred on 1490 Jun 02, lasting 99 minutes, 51 seconds. | 1562 Jul 16 | 1616 Aug 27 | 2013 Apr 25 | 2139 Jul 12 |

Eclipses are tabulated in three columns; every third eclipse in the same column is one exeligmos apart, so they all cast shadows over approximately the same parts of the Earth.

Series members 54–72 occur between 1801 and 2139:
| 54 | 55 | 56 |
|---|---|---|
| 1814 Dec 26 | 1833 Jan 06 | 1851 Jan 17 |
| 57 | 58 | 59 |
| 1869 Jan 28 | 1887 Feb 08 | 1905 Feb 19 |
| 60 | 61 | 62 |
| 1923 Mar 03 | 1941 Mar 13 | 1959 Mar 24 |
| 63 | 64 | 65 |
| 1977 Apr 04 | 1995 Apr 15 | 2013 Apr 25 |
| 66 | 67 | 68 |
| 2031 May 07 | 2049 May 17 | 2067 May 28 |
| 69 | 70 | 71 |
| 2085 Jun 08 | 2103 Jun 20 | 2121 Jun 30 |
72
2139 Jul 12

=== Tritos series ===
This eclipse is a part of a tritos cycle, repeating at alternating nodes every 135 synodic months (≈ 3986.63 days, or 11 years minus 1 month). Their appearance and longitude are irregular due to a lack of synchronization with the anomalistic month (period of perigee), but groupings of 3 tritos cycles (≈ 33 years minus 3 months) come close (≈ 434.044 anomalistic months), so eclipses are similar in these groupings.

Series members between 1817 and 2200
| 1817 May 01 (Saros 99) | 1828 Mar 31 (Saros 100) | 1839 Feb 28 (Saros 101) | 1850 Jan 28 (Saros 102) | 1860 Dec 28 (Saros 103) |
| | | 1893 Sep 25 (Saros 106) | | 1915 Jul 26 (Saros 108) |
| 1926 Jun 25 (Saros 109) | 1937 May 25 (Saros 110) | 1948 Apr 23 (Saros 111) | 1959 Mar 24 (Saros 112) | 1970 Feb 21 (Saros 113) |
| 1981 Jan 20 (Saros 114) | 1991 Dec 21 (Saros 115) | 2002 Nov 20 (Saros 116) | 2013 Oct 18 (Saros 117) | 2024 Sep 18 (Saros 118) |
| 2035 Aug 19 (Saros 119) | 2046 Jul 18 (Saros 120) | 2057 Jun 17 (Saros 121) | 2068 May 17 (Saros 122) | 2079 Apr 16 (Saros 123) |
| 2090 Mar 15 (Saros 124) | 2101 Feb 14 (Saros 125) | 2112 Jan 14 (Saros 126) | 2122 Dec 13 (Saros 127) | 2133 Nov 12 (Saros 128) |
| 2144 Oct 11 (Saros 129) | 2155 Sep 11 (Saros 130) | 2166 Aug 11 (Saros 131) | 2177 Jul 11 (Saros 132) | 2188 Jun 09 (Saros 133) |
2199 May 10 (Saros 134)

=== Inex series ===
This eclipse is a part of the long period inex cycle, repeating at alternating nodes, every 358 synodic months (≈ 10,571.95 days, or 29 years minus 20 days). Their appearance and longitude are irregular due to a lack of synchronization with the anomalistic month (period of perigee). However, groupings of 3 inex cycles (≈ 87 years minus 2 months) comes close (≈ 1,151.02 anomalistic months), so eclipses are similar in these groupings.

Series members between 1801 and 2200
| 1814 Jul 02 (Saros 107) | 1843 Jun 12 (Saros 108) | 1872 May 22 (Saros 109) |
| 1901 May 03 (Saros 110) | 1930 Apr 13 (Saros 111) | 1959 Mar 24 (Saros 112) |
| 1988 Mar 03 (Saros 113) | 2017 Feb 11 (Saros 114) | 2046 Jan 22 (Saros 115) |
| 2075 Jan 02 (Saros 116) | 2103 Dec 13 (Saros 117) | 2132 Nov 23 (Saros 118) |
| 2161 Nov 03 (Saros 119) | 2190 Oct 13 (Saros 120) | |

=== Half-Saros cycle ===
A lunar eclipse will be preceded and followed by solar eclipses by 9 years and 5.5 days (a half saros). This lunar eclipse is related to two solar eclipses of Solar Saros 119.

| March 18, 1950 | March 28, 1968 |

== See also ==
- List of lunar eclipses
- List of 20th-century lunar eclipses
