= May 2049 lunar eclipse =

Astronomical event

- Penumbral eclipse
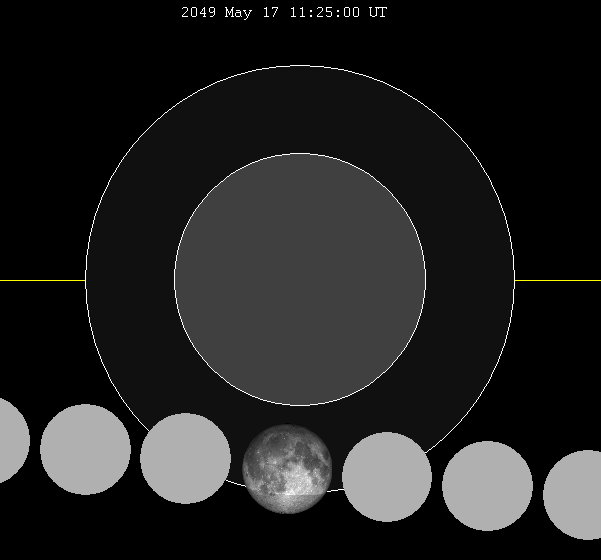
- The Moon's hourly motion shown right to left
- Date: May 17, 2049
- Gamma: −1.1337
- Magnitude: −0.2073
- Saros cycle: 112 (67 of 72)
- Penumbral: 224 minutes, 16 seconds
Contacts (UTC)
- P1: 9:33:02
- Greatest: 11:25:06
- P4: 13:17:18

A penumbral lunar eclipse will occur at the Moon’s ascending node of orbit on Monday, May 17, 2049, with an umbral magnitude of −0.2073. A lunar eclipse occurs when the Moon moves into the Earth's shadow, causing the Moon to be darkened. A penumbral lunar eclipse occurs when part or all of the Moon's near side passes into the Earth's penumbra. Unlike a solar eclipse, which can only be viewed from a relatively small area of the world, a lunar eclipse may be viewed from anywhere on the night side of Earth. Occurring about 1.9 days before perigee (on May 19, 2049, at 15:25 UTC), the Moon's apparent diameter will be larger.

== Visibility ==
The eclipse will be completely visible over Australia, Antarctica, and the Pacific Ocean, seen rising over east Asia and setting over much of North and South America.

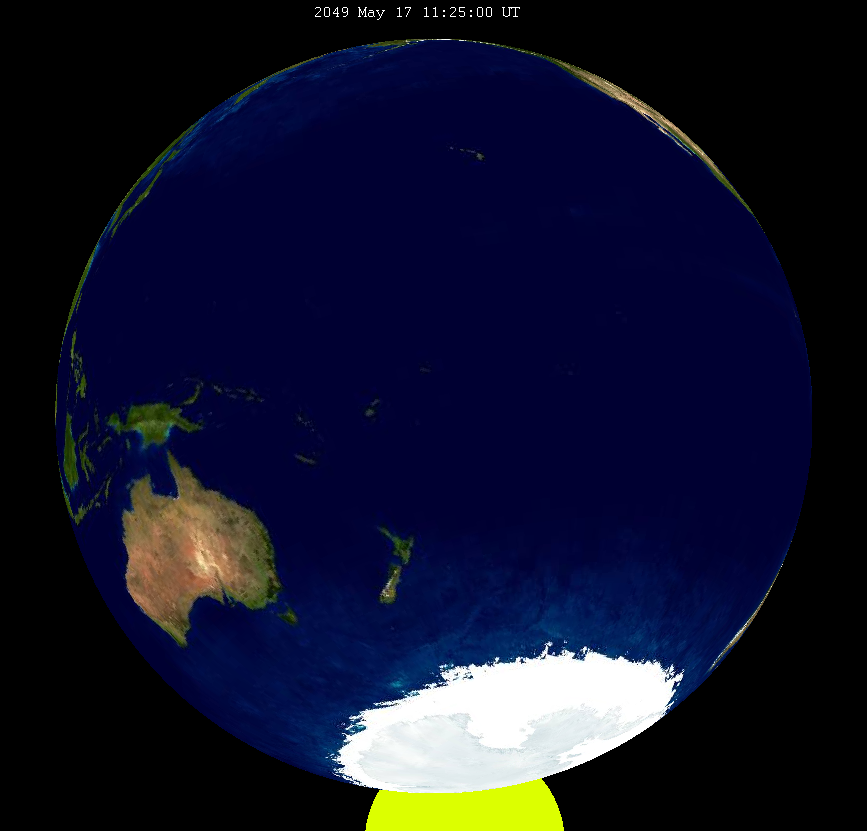
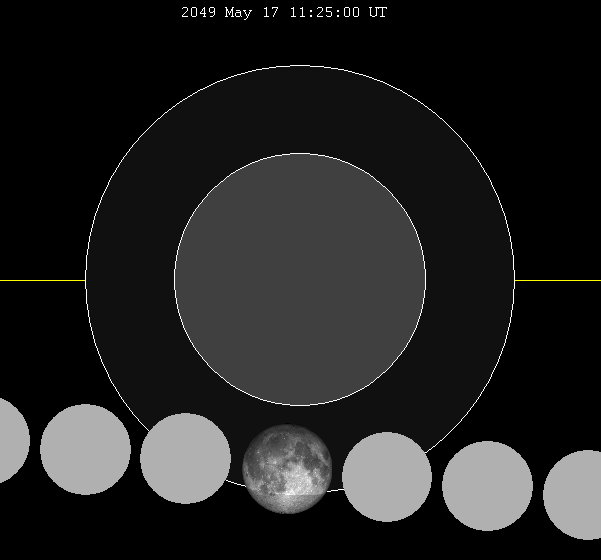

== Eclipse details ==
Shown below is a table displaying details about this particular lunar eclipse. It describes various parameters pertaining to this eclipse.

May 17, 2049 Lunar Eclipse Parameters
Parameter	Value
Penumbral Magnitude	0.76505
Umbral Magnitude	−0.20727
Gamma	−1.13375
Sun Right Ascension	03h38m51.9s
Sun Declination	+19°28'58.4"
Sun Semi-Diameter	15'49.0"
Sun Equatorial Horizontal Parallax	08.7"
Moon Right Ascension	15h38m12.8s
Moon Declination	-20°36'01.8"
Moon Semi-Diameter	16'16.0"
Moon Equatorial Horizontal Parallax	0°59'41.9"
ΔT	84.7 s

== Eclipse season ==
This eclipse is part of an eclipse season, a period, roughly every six months, when eclipses occur. Only two (or occasionally three) eclipse seasons occur each year, and each season lasts about 35 days and repeats just short of six months (173 days) later; thus two full eclipse seasons always occur each year. Either two or three eclipses happen each eclipse season. In the sequence below, each eclipse is separated by a fortnight. The first and last eclipse in this sequence is separated by one synodic month.

Eclipse season of May–June 2049
May 17 Ascending node (full moon)	May 31 Descending node (new moon)	June 15 Ascending node (full moon)
Penumbral lunar eclipse Lunar Saros 112	Annular solar eclipse Solar Saros 138	Penumbral lunar eclipse Lunar Saros 150

== Related eclipses ==
=== Eclipses in 2049 ===
- A penumbral lunar eclipse on May 17.
- An annular solar eclipse on May 31.
- A penumbral lunar eclipse on June 15.
- A penumbral lunar eclipse on November 9.
- A hybrid solar eclipse on November 25.

=== Metonic ===
- Followed by: Lunar eclipse of March 4, 2053

=== Tzolkinex ===
- Preceded by: Lunar eclipse of April 5, 2042
- Followed by: Lunar eclipse of June 27, 2056

=== Half-Saros ===
- Preceded by: Solar eclipse of May 11, 2040
- Followed by: Solar eclipse of May 22, 2058

=== Tritos ===
- Preceded by: Lunar eclipse of June 17, 2038
- Followed by: Lunar eclipse of April 15, 2060

=== Lunar Saros 112 ===
- Preceded by: Lunar eclipse of May 7, 2031
- Followed by: Lunar eclipse of May 28, 2067

=== Inex ===
- Preceded by: Lunar eclipse of June 5, 2020
- Followed by: Lunar eclipse of April 27, 2078

=== Triad ===
- Preceded by: Lunar eclipse of July 17, 1962
- Followed by: Lunar eclipse of March 18, 2136

=== Lunar eclipses of 2049–2052 ===
This eclipse is a member of a semester series. An eclipse in a semester series of lunar eclipses repeats approximately every 177 days and 4 hours (a semester) at alternating nodes of the Moon's orbit.

The penumbral lunar eclipse on June 15, 2049 occurs in the previous lunar year eclipse set.

Lunar eclipse series sets from 2049 to 2052
Ascending node				Descending node			
Saros	Date Viewing	Type Chart	Gamma	Saros	Date Viewing	Type Chart	Gamma
112	2049 May 17	Penumbral	−1.1337	117	2049 Nov 09	Penumbral	1.1964
122	2050 May 06	Total	−0.4181	127	2050 Oct 30	Total	0.4435
132	2051 Apr 26	Total	0.3371	137	2051 Oct 19	Total	−0.2542
142	2052 Apr 14	Penumbral	1.0628	147	2052 Oct 08	Partial	−0.9726

=== Saros 112 ===
This eclipse is a part of Saros series 112, repeating every 18 years, 11 days, and containing 72 events. The series started with a penumbral lunar eclipse on May 20, 859 AD. It contains partial eclipses from August 3, 985 AD through March 8, 1346; total eclipses from March 18, 1364 through August 27, 1616; and a second set of partial eclipses from September 7, 1634 through April 25, 2013. The series ends at member 72 as a penumbral eclipse on July 12, 2139.

The longest duration of totality was produced by member 36 at 99 minutes, 51 seconds on June 2, 1490. All eclipses in this series occur at the Moon’s ascending node of orbit.

Greatest	First			
The greatest eclipse of the series occurred on 1490 Jun 02, lasting 99 minutes, 51 seconds.	Penumbral	Partial	Total	Central
The greatest eclipse of the series occurred on 1490 Jun 02, lasting 99 minutes, 51 seconds.	859 May 20	985 Aug 03	1364 Mar 18	1436 Apr 30
The greatest eclipse of the series occurred on 1490 Jun 02, lasting 99 minutes, 51 seconds.	Last			
The greatest eclipse of the series occurred on 1490 Jun 02, lasting 99 minutes, 51 seconds.	Central	Total	Partial	Penumbral
The greatest eclipse of the series occurred on 1490 Jun 02, lasting 99 minutes, 51 seconds.	1562 Jul 16	1616 Aug 27	2013 Apr 25	2139 Jul 12

Eclipses are tabulated in three columns; every third eclipse in the same column is one exeligmos apart, so they all cast shadows over approximately the same parts of the Earth.

Series members 54–72 occur between 1801 and 2139:
54	55	56
1814 Dec 26	1833 Jan 06	1851 Jan 17
57	58	59
1869 Jan 28	1887 Feb 08	1905 Feb 19
60	61	62
1923 Mar 03	1941 Mar 13	1959 Mar 24
63	64	65
1977 Apr 04	1995 Apr 15	2013 Apr 25
66	67	68
2031 May 07	2049 May 17	2067 May 28
69	70	71
2085 Jun 08	2103 Jun 20	2121 Jun 30
72
2139 Jul 12

=== Tritos series ===
This eclipse is a part of a tritos cycle, repeating at alternating nodes every 135 synodic months (≈ 3986.63 days, or 11 years minus 1 month). Their appearance and longitude are irregular due to a lack of synchronization with the anomalistic month (period of perigee), but groupings of 3 tritos cycles (≈ 33 years minus 3 months) come close (≈ 434.044 anomalistic months), so eclipses are similar in these groupings.

Series members between 1940 and 2200
1940 Mar 23 (Saros 102)	1951 Feb 21 (Saros 103)			
			2027 Jul 18 (Saros 110)	2038 Jun 17 (Saros 111)
2049 May 17 (Saros 112)	2060 Apr 15 (Saros 113)	2071 Mar 16 (Saros 114)	2082 Feb 13 (Saros 115)	2093 Jan 12 (Saros 116)
2103 Dec 13 (Saros 117)	2114 Nov 12 (Saros 118)	2125 Oct 12 (Saros 119)	2136 Sep 10 (Saros 120)	2147 Aug 11 (Saros 121)
2158 Jul 11 (Saros 122)	2169 Jun 09 (Saros 123)	2180 May 09 (Saros 124)	2191 Apr 09 (Saros 125)	

=== Inex series ===
This eclipse is a part of the long period inex cycle, repeating at alternating nodes, every 358 synodic months (≈ 10,571.95 days, or 29 years minus 20 days). Their appearance and longitude are irregular due to a lack of synchronization with the anomalistic month (period of perigee). However, groupings of 3 inex cycles (≈ 87 years minus 2 months) comes close (≈ 1,151.02 anomalistic months), so eclipses are similar in these groupings.

Series members between 1846 and 2200
1846 Oct 04 (Saros 105)	1875 Sep 15 (Saros 106)	
1933 Aug 05 (Saros 108)	1962 Jul 17 (Saros 109)	1991 Jun 27 (Saros 110)
2020 Jun 05 (Saros 111)	2049 May 17 (Saros 112)	2078 Apr 27 (Saros 113)
2107 Apr 07 (Saros 114)	2136 Mar 18 (Saros 115)	2165 Feb 26 (Saros 116)
2194 Feb 05 (Saros 117)

=== Half-Saros cycle ===
A lunar eclipse will be preceded and followed by solar eclipses by 9 years and 5.5 days (a half saros). This lunar eclipse is related to two partial solar eclipses of Solar Saros 119.

May 11, 2040	May 22, 2058

== See also ==
- List of lunar eclipses and List of 21st-century lunar eclipses
