= April 1977 lunar eclipse =

Partial lunar eclipse April 4, 1977

- Partial eclipse
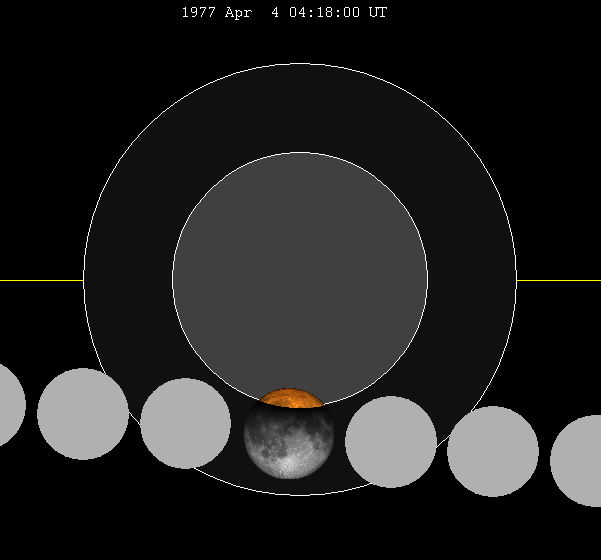
- The Moon's hourly motion shown right to left
- Date: April 4, 1977
- Gamma: −0.9148
- Magnitude: 0.1929
- Saros cycle: 112 (63 of 72)
- Partiality: 94 minutes, 44 seconds
- Penumbral: 262 minutes, 52 seconds
Contacts (UTC)
- P1: 2:06:52
- U1: 3:30:58
- Greatest: 4:18:16
- U4: 5:05:42
- P4: 6:29:44

A partial lunar eclipse occurred at the Moon's ascending node of orbit on Monday, April 4, 1977, with an umbral magnitude of 0.1929. A lunar eclipse occurs when the Moon moves into the Earth's shadow, causing the Moon to be darkened. A partial lunar eclipse occurs when one part of the Moon is in the Earth's umbra, while the other part is in the Earth's penumbra. Unlike a solar eclipse, which can only be viewed from a relatively small area of the world, a lunar eclipse may be viewed from anywhere on the night side of Earth. Occurring about 1.7 days before perigee (on April 5, 1977, at 21:50 UTC), the Moon's apparent diameter was larger.

== Visibility ==
The eclipse was completely visible over much of North America, South America, and west Africa, seen rising over western North America and the central Pacific Ocean and setting over Africa, Europe and the Middle East.

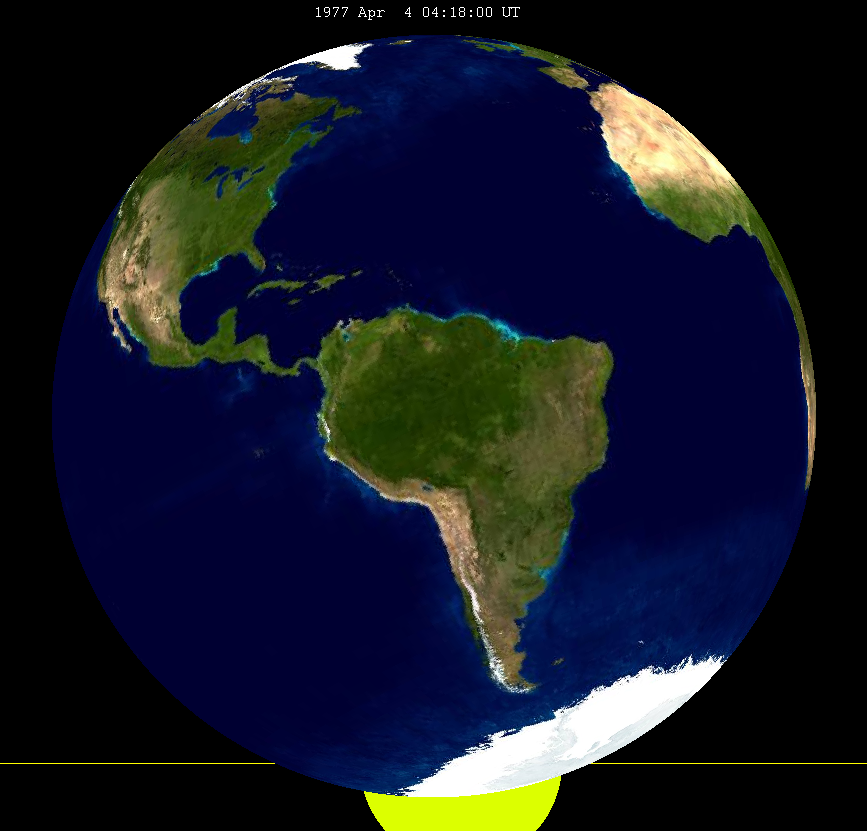
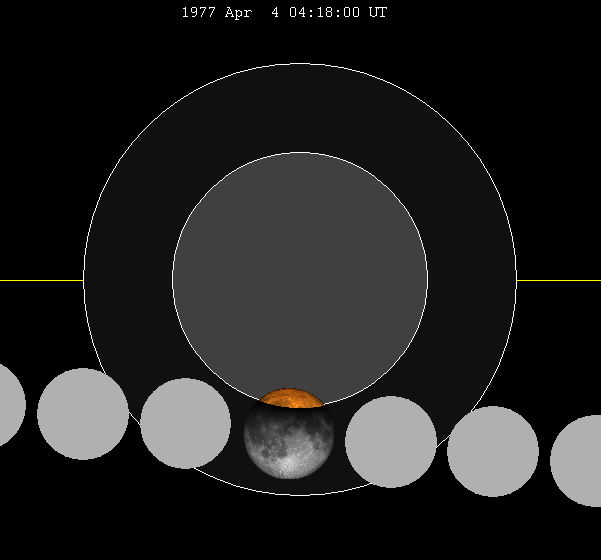

== Eclipse details ==
Shown below is a table displaying details about this particular lunar eclipse. It describes various parameters pertaining to this eclipse.

April 4, 1977 Lunar Eclipse Parameters
Parameter	Value
Penumbral Magnitude	1.16570
Umbral Magnitude	0.19289
Gamma	−0.91483
Sun Right Ascension	00h52m35.5s
Sun Declination	+05°37'56.4"
Sun Semi-Diameter	15'59.4"
Sun Equatorial Horizontal Parallax	08.8"
Moon Right Ascension	12h51m29.8s
Moon Declination	-06°30'38.9"
Moon Semi-Diameter	16'26.2"
Moon Equatorial Horizontal Parallax	1°00'19.6"
ΔT	47.8 s

== Eclipse season ==
This eclipse is part of an eclipse season, a period, roughly every six months, when eclipses occur. Only two (or occasionally three) eclipse seasons occur each year, and each season lasts about 35 days and repeats just short of six months (173 days) later; thus two full eclipse seasons always occur each year. Either two or three eclipses happen each eclipse season. In the sequence below, each eclipse is separated by a fortnight.

Eclipse season of April 1977
April 4 Ascending node (full moon)	April 18 Descending node (new moon)
Partial lunar eclipse Lunar Saros 112	Annular solar eclipse Solar Saros 138

== Related eclipses ==
=== Eclipses in 1977 ===
- A partial lunar eclipse on April 4.
- An annular solar eclipse on April 18.
- A penumbral lunar eclipse on September 27.
- A total solar eclipse on October 12.

=== Metonic ===
- Preceded by: Lunar eclipse of June 15, 1973
- Followed by: Lunar eclipse of January 20, 1981

=== Tzolkinex ===
- Preceded by: Lunar eclipse of February 21, 1970
- Followed by: Lunar eclipse of May 15, 1984

=== Half-Saros ===
- Preceded by: Solar eclipse of March 28, 1968
- Followed by: Solar eclipse of April 9, 1986

=== Tritos ===
- Preceded by: Lunar eclipse of May 4, 1966
- Followed by: Lunar eclipse of March 3, 1988

=== Lunar Saros 112 ===
- Preceded by: Lunar eclipse of March 24, 1959
- Followed by: Lunar eclipse of April 15, 1995

=== Inex ===
- Preceded by: Lunar eclipse of April 23, 1948
- Followed by: Lunar eclipse of March 14, 2006

=== Triad ===
- Preceded by: Lunar eclipse of June 3, 1890
- Followed by: Lunar eclipse of February 2, 2064

=== Lunar eclipses of 1977–1980 ===
This eclipse is a member of a semester series. An eclipse in a semester series of lunar eclipses repeats approximately every 177 days and 4 hours (a semester) at alternating nodes of the Moon's orbit.

The penumbral lunar eclipse on July 27, 1980 occurs in the next lunar year eclipse set.

Lunar eclipse series sets from 1977 to 1980
Ascending node				Descending node			
Saros	Date Viewing	Type Chart	Gamma	Saros	Date Viewing	Type Chart	Gamma
112	1977 Apr 04	Partial	−0.9148	117	1977 Sep 27	Penumbral	1.0768
122	1978 Mar 24	Total	−0.2140	127	1978 Sep 16	Total	0.2951
132	1979 Mar 13	Partial	0.5254	137	1979 Sep 06	Total	−0.4305
142	1980 Mar 01	Penumbral	1.2270	147	1980 Aug 26	Penumbral	−1.1608

=== Saros 112 ===
This eclipse is a part of Saros series 112, repeating every 18 years, 11 days, and containing 72 events. The series started with a penumbral lunar eclipse on May 20, 859 AD. It contains partial eclipses from August 3, 985 AD through March 8, 1346; total eclipses from March 18, 1364 through August 27, 1616; and a second set of partial eclipses from September 7, 1634 through April 25, 2013. The series ends at member 72 as a penumbral eclipse on July 12, 2139.

The longest duration of totality was produced by member 36 at 99 minutes, 51 seconds on June 2, 1490. All eclipses in this series occur at the Moon’s ascending node of orbit.

Greatest	First			
The greatest eclipse of the series occurred on 1490 Jun 02, lasting 99 minutes, 51 seconds.	Penumbral	Partial	Total	Central
The greatest eclipse of the series occurred on 1490 Jun 02, lasting 99 minutes, 51 seconds.	859 May 20	985 Aug 03	1364 Mar 18	1436 Apr 30
The greatest eclipse of the series occurred on 1490 Jun 02, lasting 99 minutes, 51 seconds.	Last			
The greatest eclipse of the series occurred on 1490 Jun 02, lasting 99 minutes, 51 seconds.	Central	Total	Partial	Penumbral
The greatest eclipse of the series occurred on 1490 Jun 02, lasting 99 minutes, 51 seconds.	1562 Jul 16	1616 Aug 27	2013 Apr 25	2139 Jul 12

Eclipses are tabulated in three columns; every third eclipse in the same column is one exeligmos apart, so they all cast shadows over approximately the same parts of the Earth.

Series members 54–72 occur between 1801 and 2139:
54	55	56
1814 Dec 26	1833 Jan 06	1851 Jan 17
57	58	59
1869 Jan 28	1887 Feb 08	1905 Feb 19
60	61	62
1923 Mar 03	1941 Mar 13	1959 Mar 24
63	64	65
1977 Apr 04	1995 Apr 15	2013 Apr 25
66	67	68
2031 May 07	2049 May 17	2067 May 28
69	70	71
2085 Jun 08	2103 Jun 20	2121 Jun 30
72
2139 Jul 12

=== Tritos series ===
This eclipse is a part of a tritos cycle, repeating at alternating nodes every 135 synodic months (≈ 3986.63 days, or 11 years minus 1 month). Their appearance and longitude are irregular due to a lack of synchronization with the anomalistic month (period of perigee), but groupings of 3 tritos cycles (≈ 33 years minus 3 months) come close (≈ 434.044 anomalistic months), so eclipses are similar in these groupings.

Series members between 1835 and 2200
1835 May 12 (Saros 99)	1846 Apr 11 (Saros 100)		1868 Feb 08 (Saros 102)	1879 Jan 08 (Saros 103)
				1933 Aug 05 (Saros 108)
1944 Jul 06 (Saros 109)	1955 Jun 05 (Saros 110)	1966 May 04 (Saros 111)	1977 Apr 04 (Saros 112)	1988 Mar 03 (Saros 113)
1999 Jan 31 (Saros 114)	2009 Dec 31 (Saros 115)	2020 Nov 30 (Saros 116)	2031 Oct 30 (Saros 117)	2042 Sep 29 (Saros 118)
2053 Aug 29 (Saros 119)	2064 Jul 28 (Saros 120)	2075 Jun 28 (Saros 121)	2086 May 28 (Saros 122)	2097 Apr 26 (Saros 123)
2108 Mar 27 (Saros 124)	2119 Feb 25 (Saros 125)	2130 Jan 24 (Saros 126)	2140 Dec 23 (Saros 127)	2151 Nov 24 (Saros 128)
2162 Oct 23 (Saros 129)	2173 Sep 21 (Saros 130)	2184 Aug 21 (Saros 131)	2195 Jul 22 (Saros 132)	

=== Inex series ===
This eclipse is a part of the long period inex cycle, repeating at alternating nodes, every 358 synodic months (≈ 10,571.95 days, or 29 years minus 20 days). Their appearance and longitude are irregular due to a lack of synchronization with the anomalistic month (period of perigee). However, groupings of 3 inex cycles (≈ 87 years minus 2 months) comes close (≈ 1,151.02 anomalistic months), so eclipses are similar in these groupings.

Series members between 1801 and 2200
1803 Aug 03 (Saros 106)	1832 Jul 12 (Saros 107)	1861 Jun 22 (Saros 108)
1890 Jun 03 (Saros 109)	1919 May 15 (Saros 110)	1948 Apr 23 (Saros 111)
1977 Apr 04 (Saros 112)	2006 Mar 14 (Saros 113)	2035 Feb 22 (Saros 114)
2064 Feb 02 (Saros 115)	2093 Jan 12 (Saros 116)	2121 Dec 24 (Saros 117)
2150 Dec 04 (Saros 118)	2179 Nov 14 (Saros 119)	

=== Half-Saros cycle ===
A lunar eclipse will be preceded and followed by solar eclipses by 9 years and 5.5 days (a half saros). This lunar eclipse is related to two partial solar eclipses of Solar Saros 119.

March 28, 1968	April 9, 1986

== See also ==
- List of lunar eclipses
- List of 20th-century lunar eclipses
