= April 2013 lunar eclipse =

Partial lunar eclipse 25 April 2013

- Partial eclipse
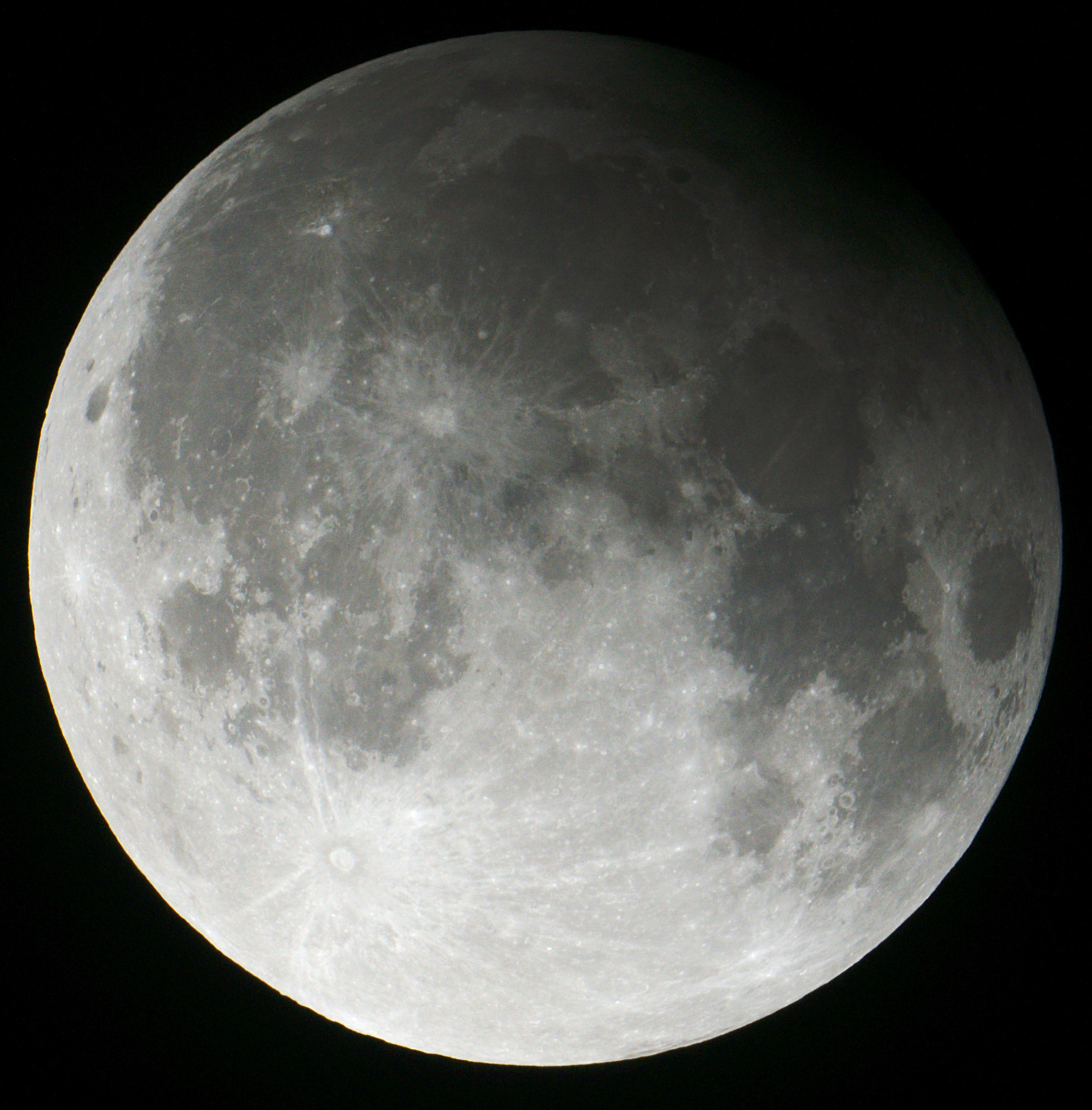
- Partiality as viewed from Rabka-Zdrój, Poland, 20:10 UTC
- Date: April 25, 2013
- Gamma: −1.0121
- Magnitude: 0.0160
- Saros cycle: 112 (65 of 72)
- Partiality: 27 minutes, 0 seconds
- Penumbral: 247 minutes, 42 seconds
Contacts (UTC)
- P1: 18:03:41
- U1: 19:54:04
- Greatest: 20:07:29
- U4: 20:21:04
- P4: 22:11:23

A partial lunar eclipse occurred at the Moon's ascending node of orbit on Thursday, April 25, 2013, with an umbral magnitude of 0.0160. A lunar eclipse occurs when the Moon moves into the Earth's shadow, causing the Moon to be darkened. A partial lunar eclipse occurs when one part of the Moon is in the Earth's umbra, while the other part is in the Earth's penumbra. Unlike a solar eclipse, which can only be viewed from a relatively small area of the world, a lunar eclipse may be viewed from anywhere on the night side of Earth. Occurring about 1.8 days before perigee (on April 27, 2013, at 15:50 UTC), the Moon's apparent diameter was larger.

Only a tiny sliver (1.48%) of the Moon was covered by the Earth's umbral shadow at maximum eclipse, but the entire northern half of the Moon was darkened from being inside the penumbral shadow. This was one of the shortest partial eclipses of the Moon in the 21st century, lasting 27 minutes. This was also the last of 58 umbral lunar eclipses in Lunar Saros 112.

== Visibility ==
The eclipse was completely visible over Africa, Europe, and Asia, seen rising over eastern South America and setting over Australia.

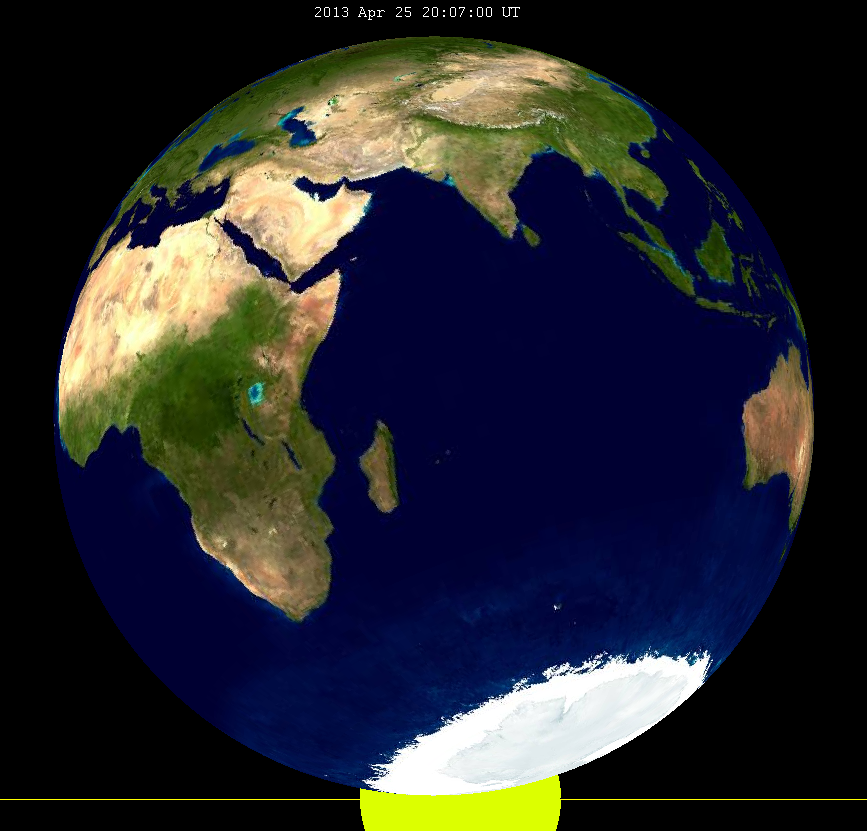
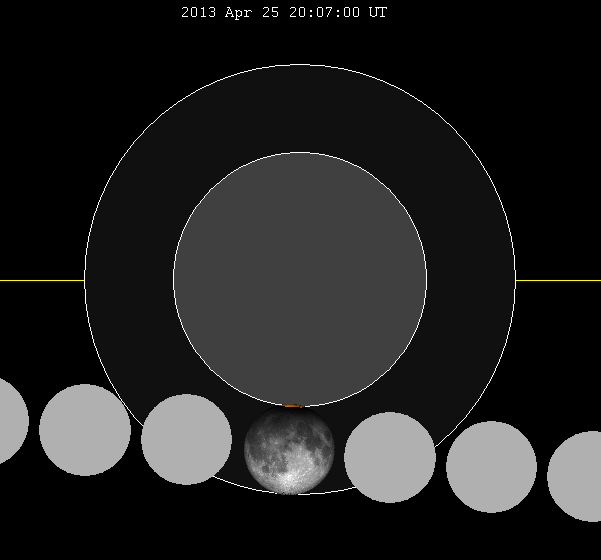
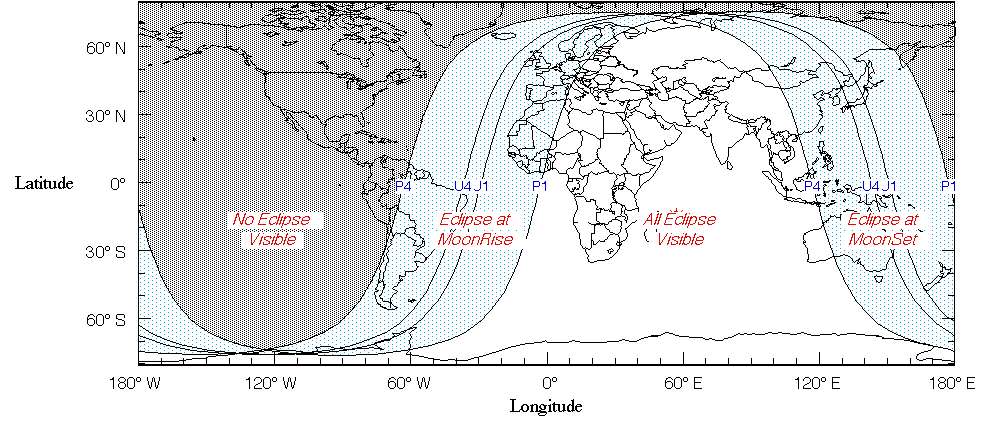
Visibility map

== Images ==
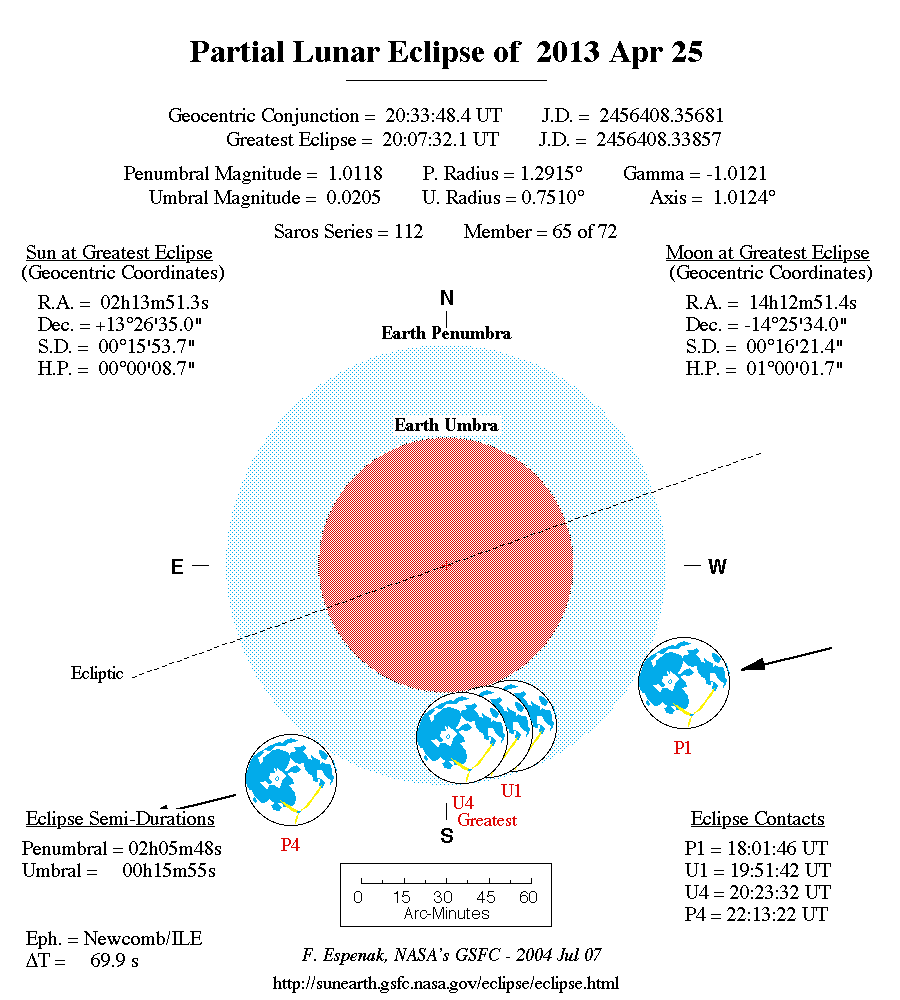
NASA chart of the eclipse

== Gallery ==
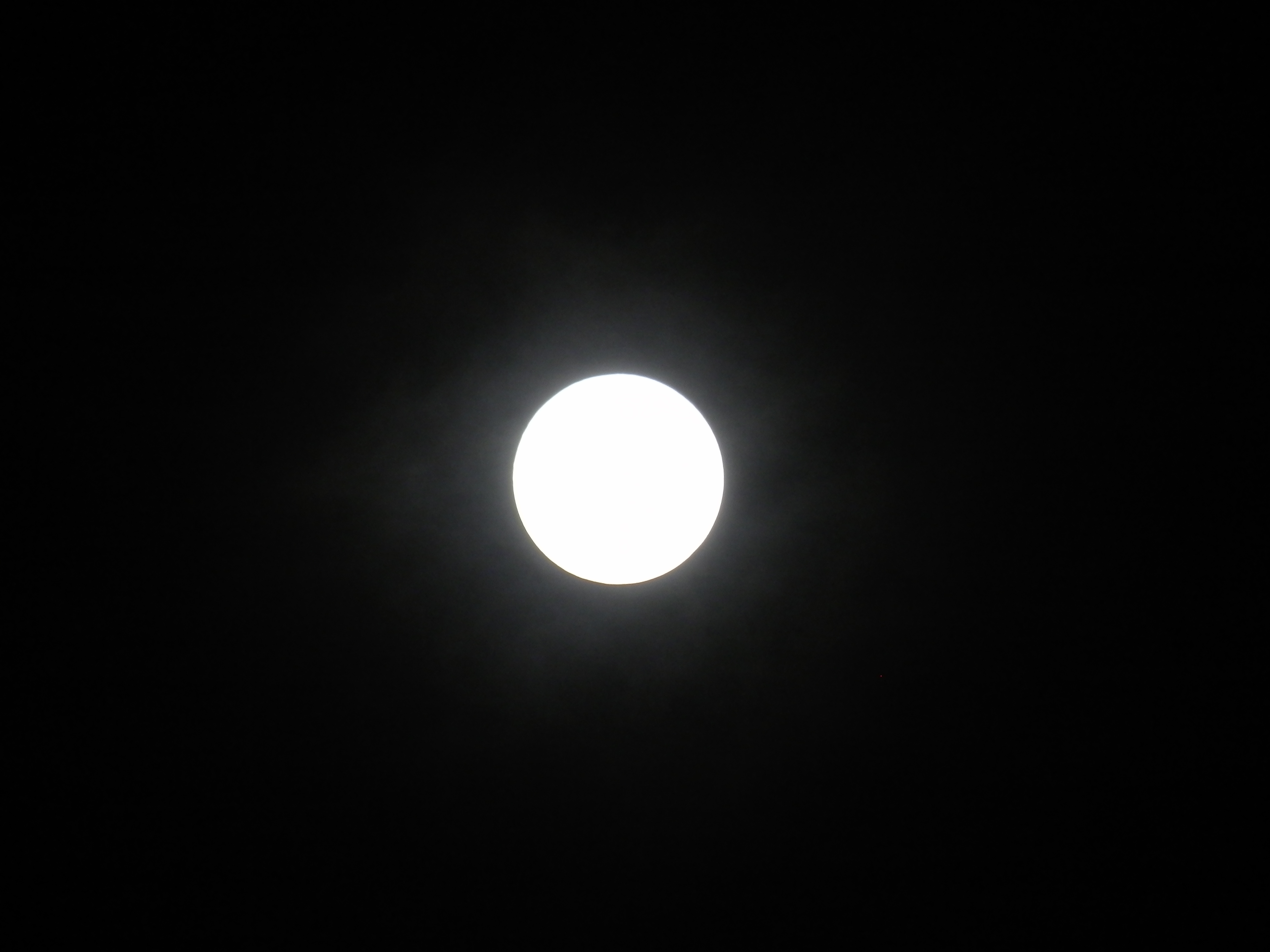
From Melbourne, Australia, 18:42 UTC

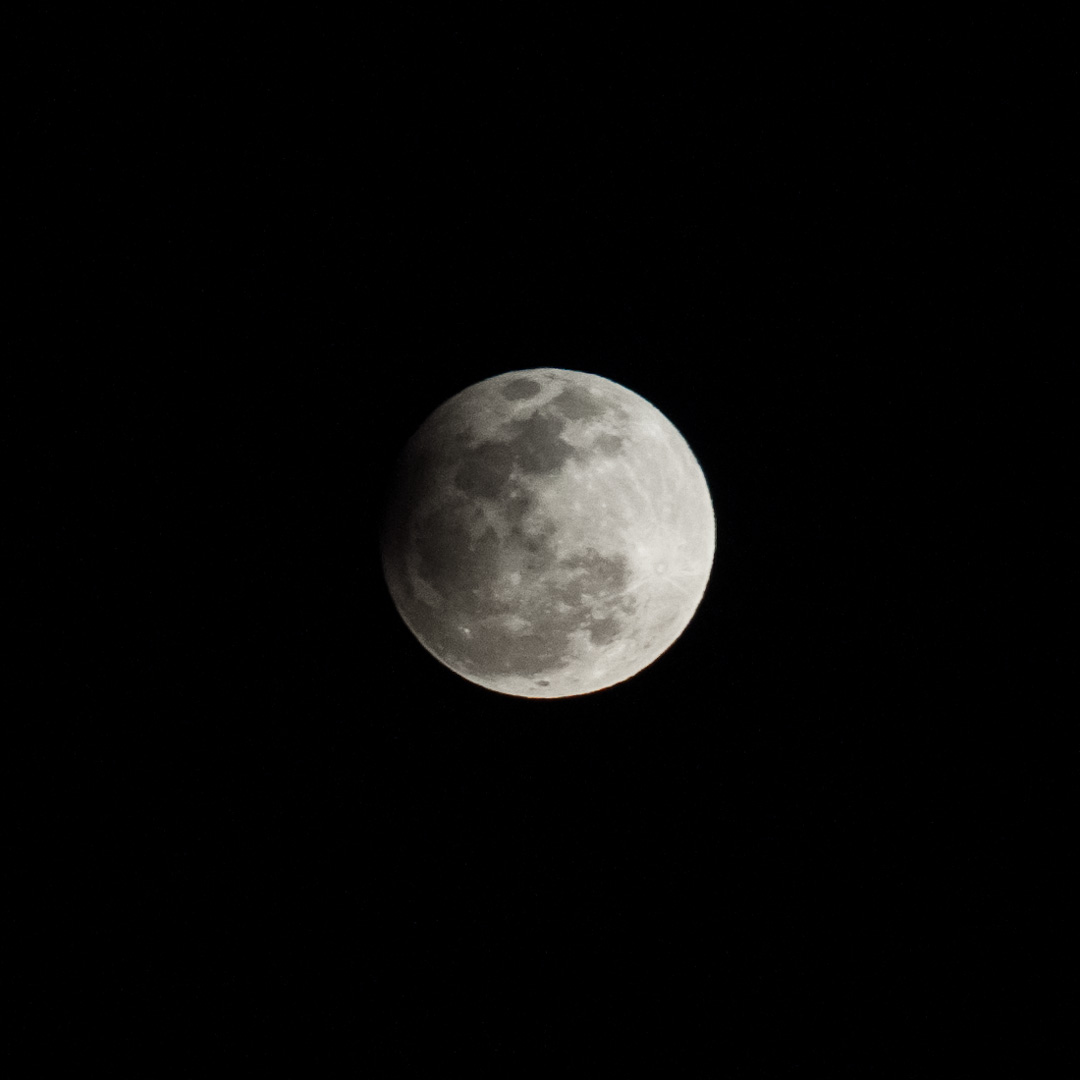
From Las Palmas, Canary Islands, 20:05 UTC

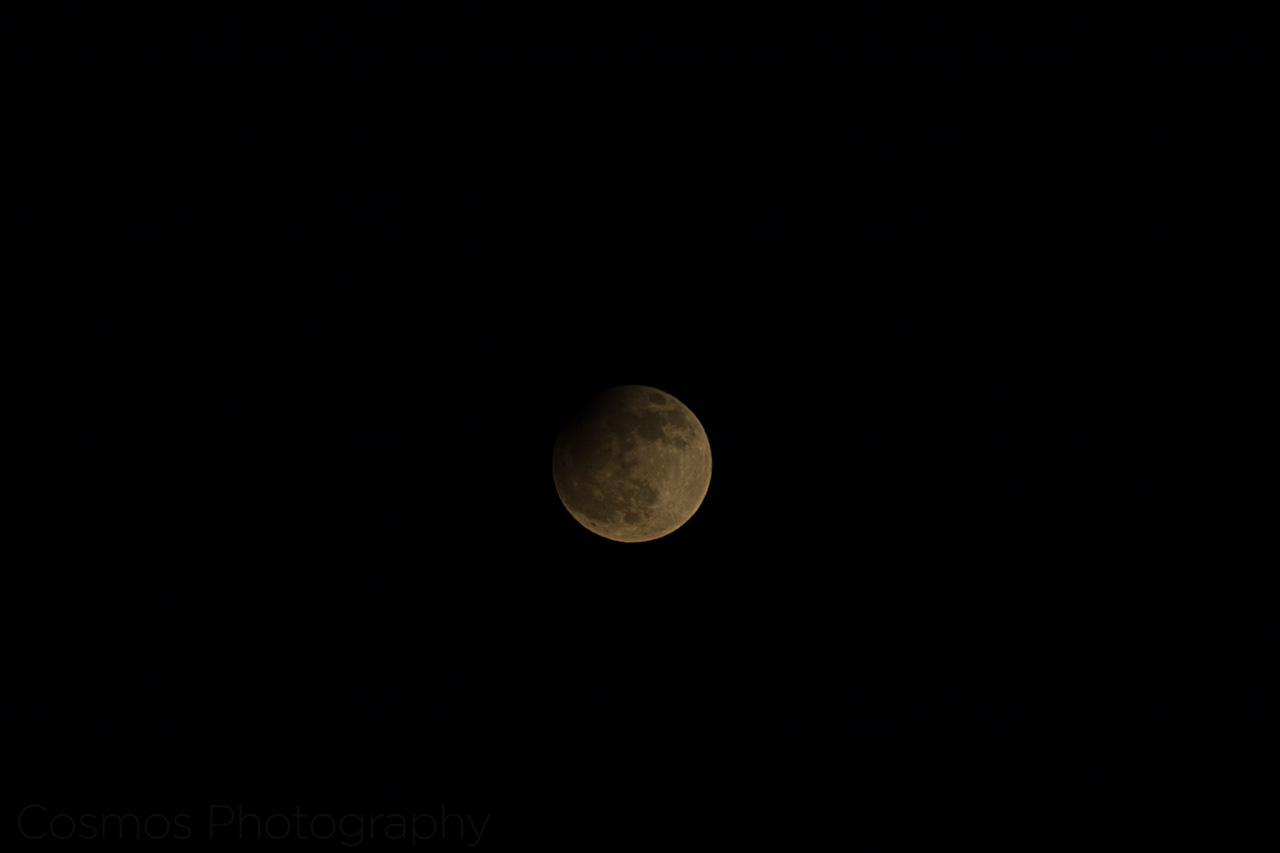
From Essex, England, 20:06 UTC

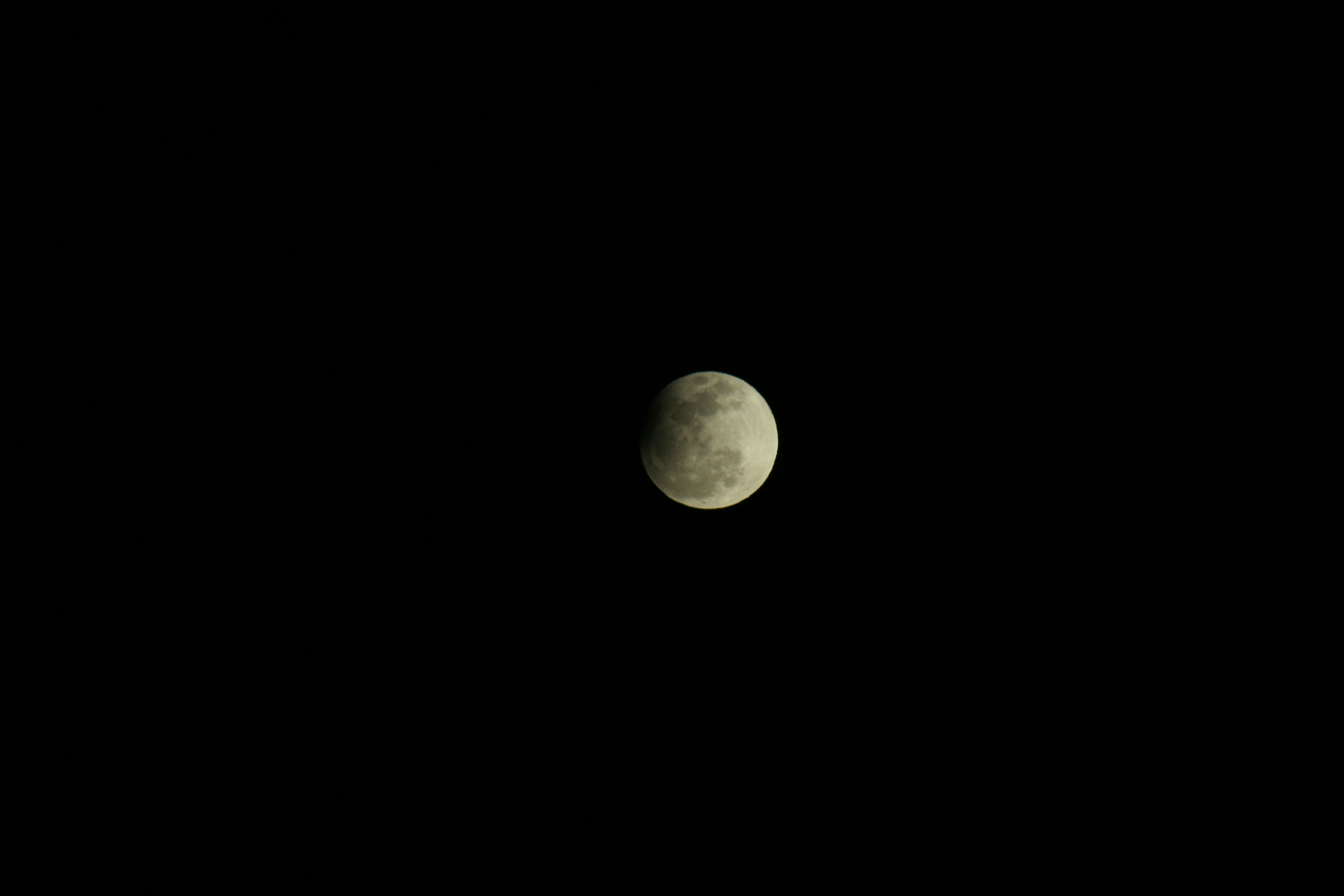
From Arinaga, Canary Islands, 20:07 UTC

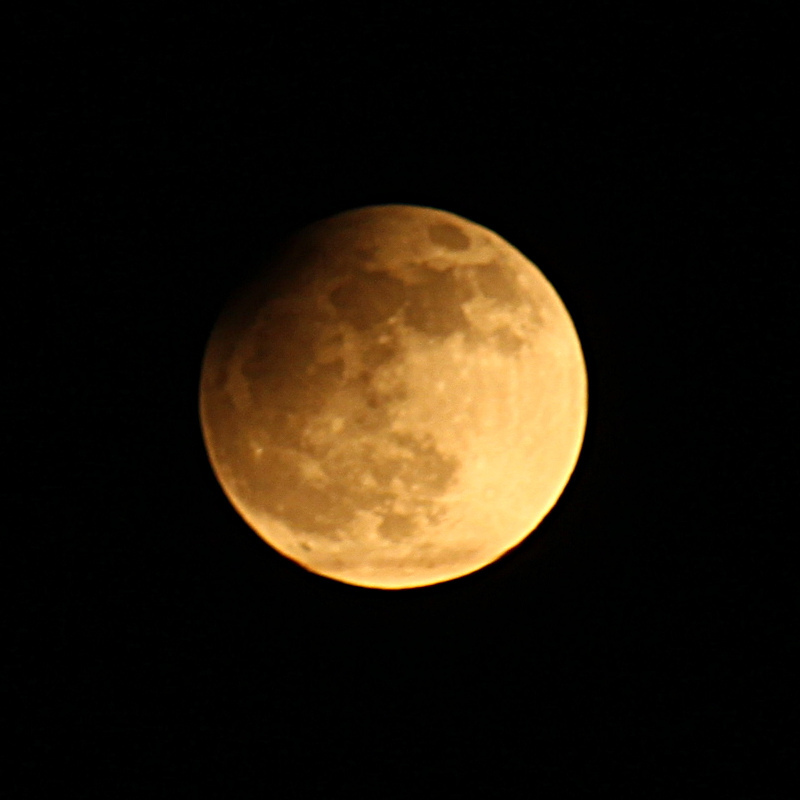
From Foncquevillers, France, 20:08 UTC

From Belfort, France, combined images

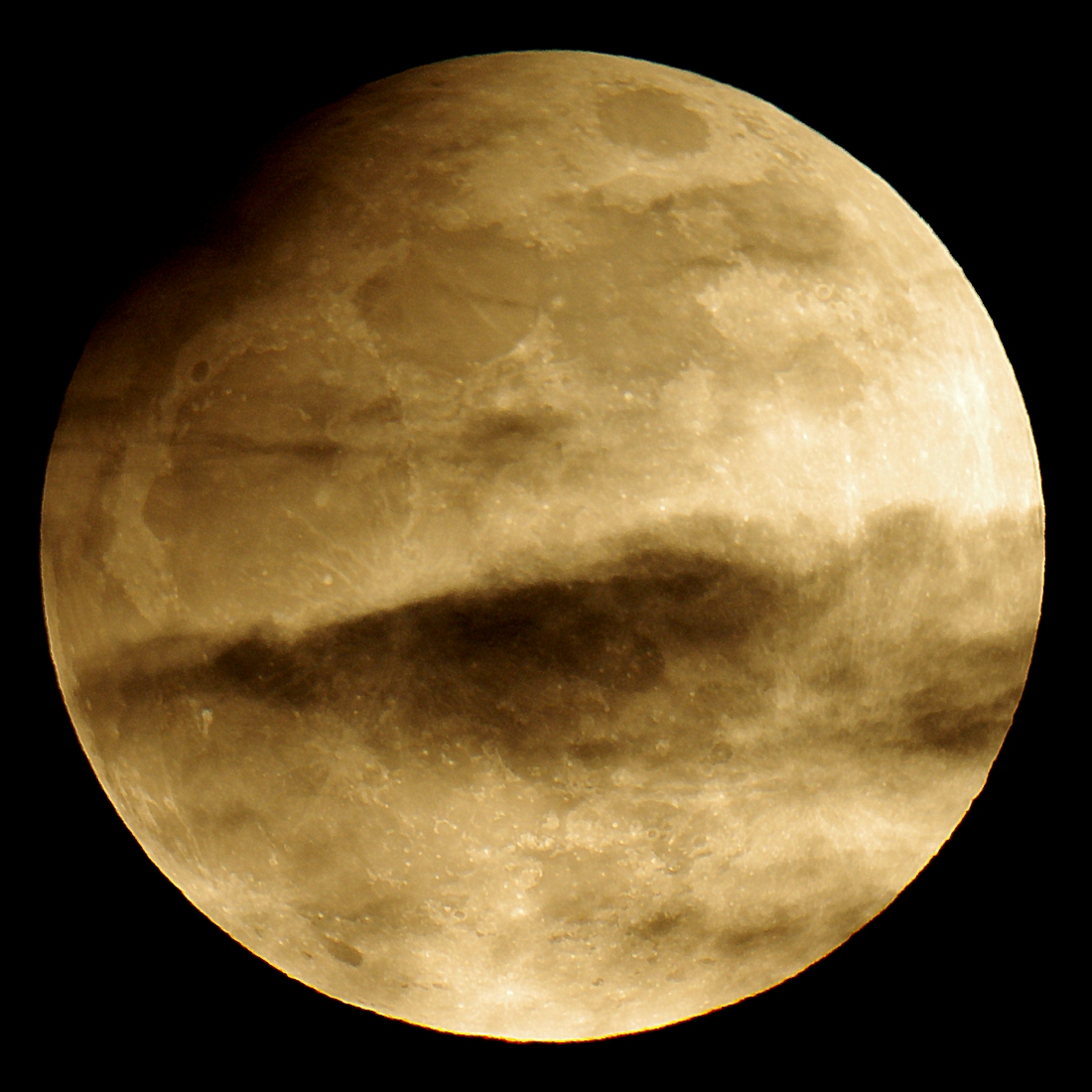
From Thatcham, UK, 20:10 UTC

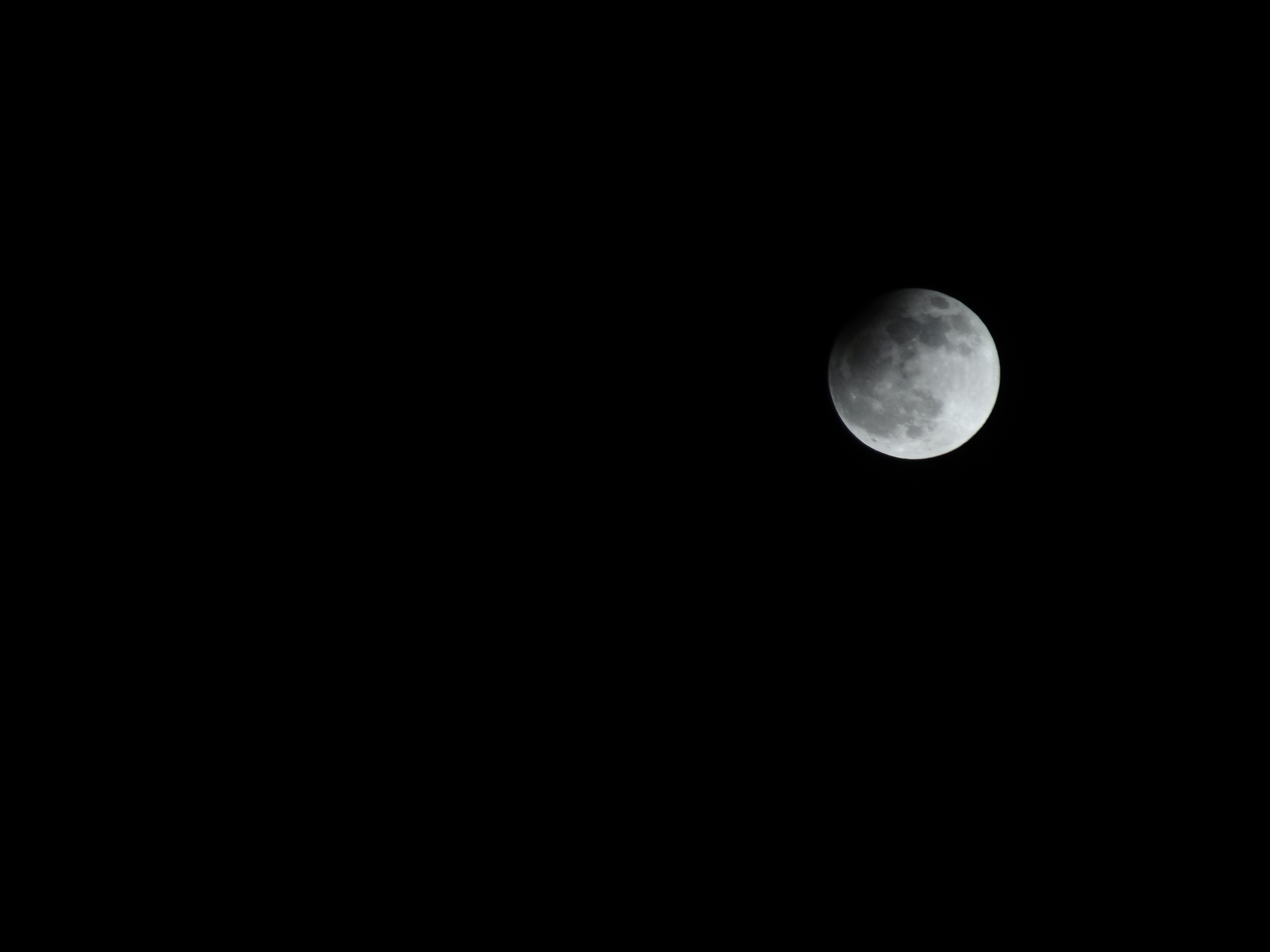
From Zürich, Switzerland, 20:12 UTC

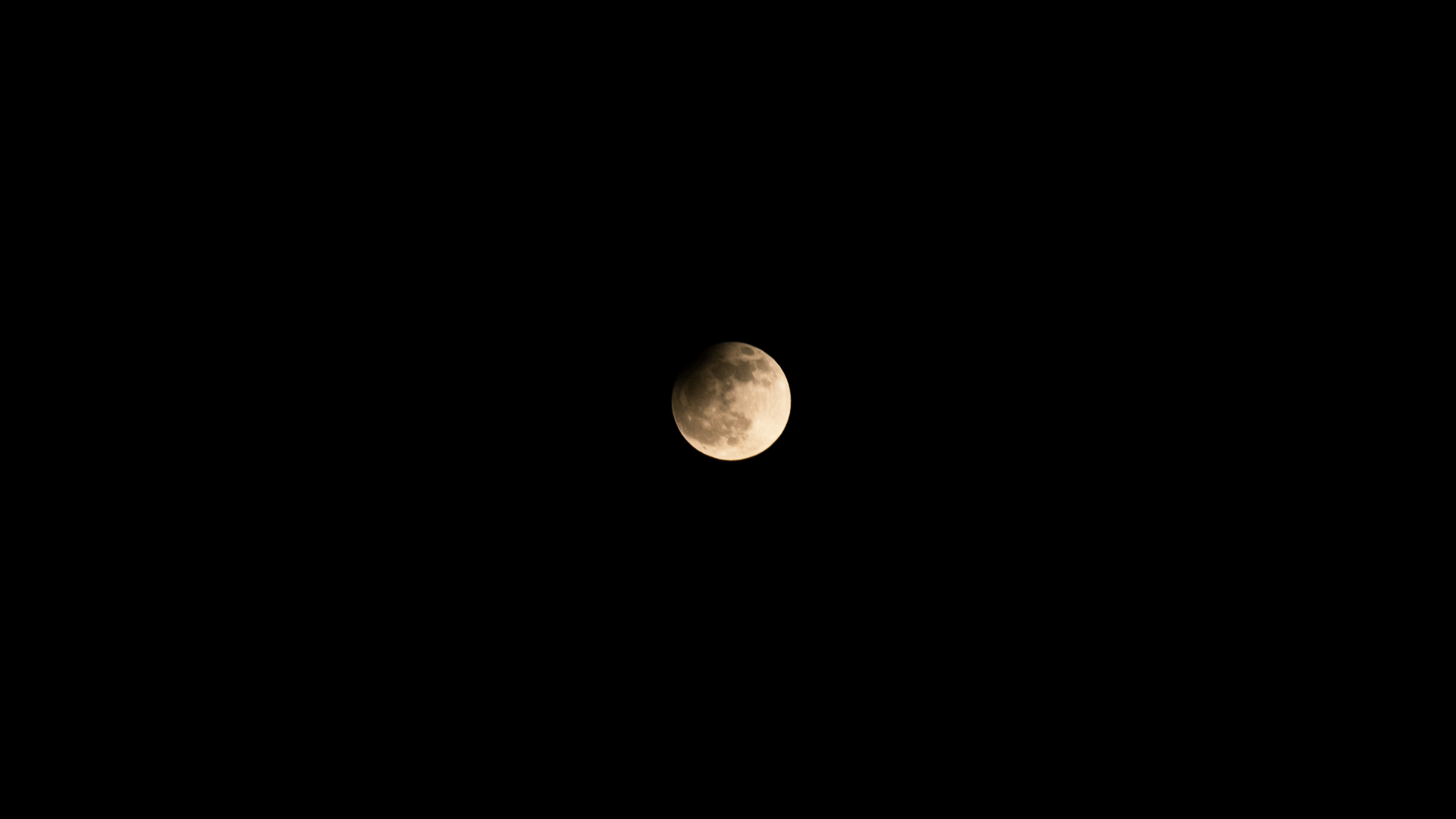
From Düsseldorf, Germany, 20:13 UTC

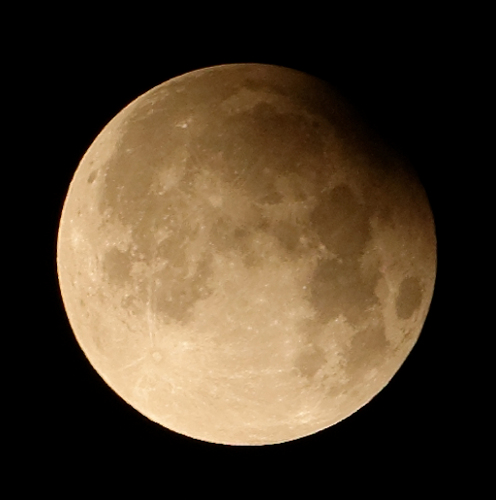
From Paris, France, 20:18 UTC

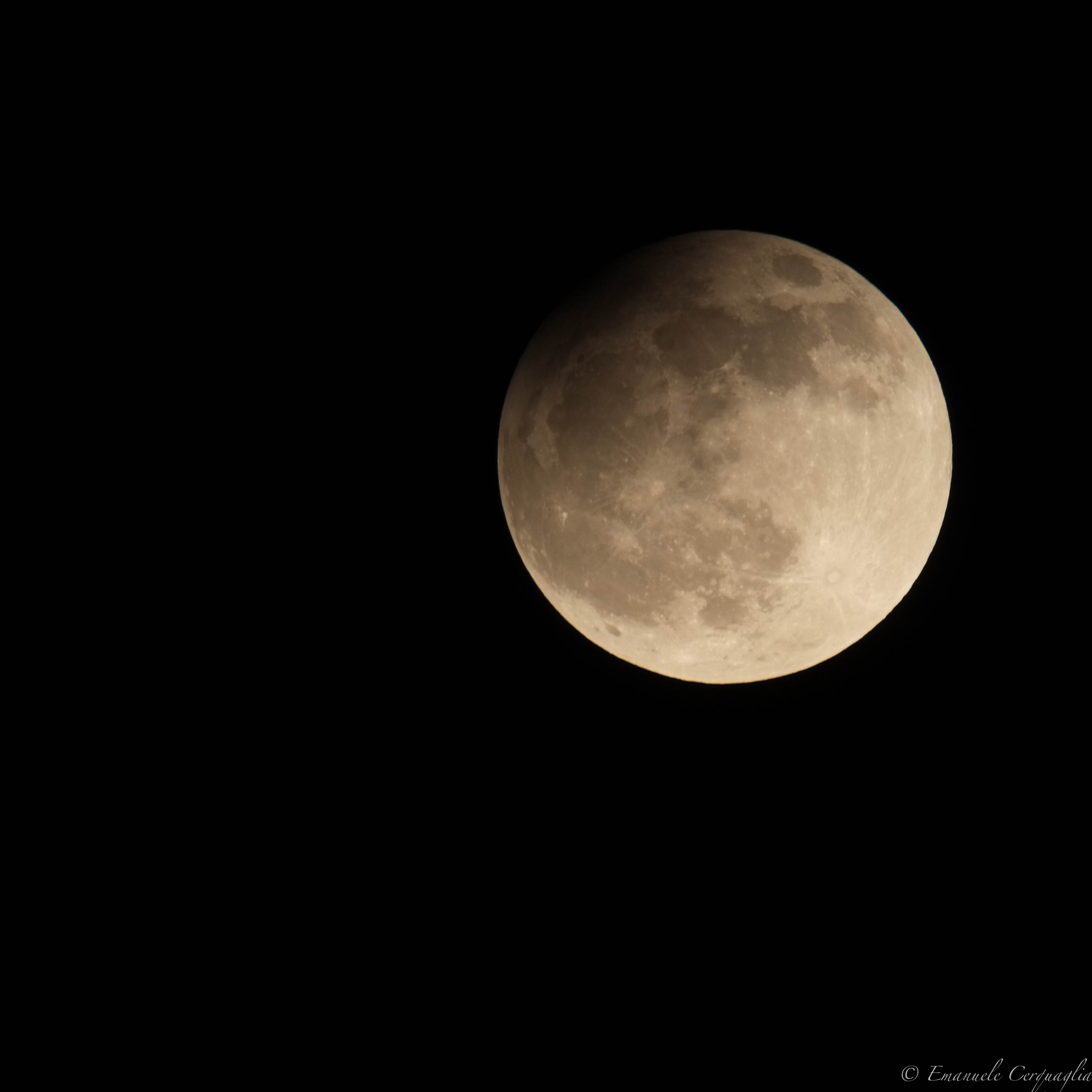
From Brescia, Italy, 20:19 UTC

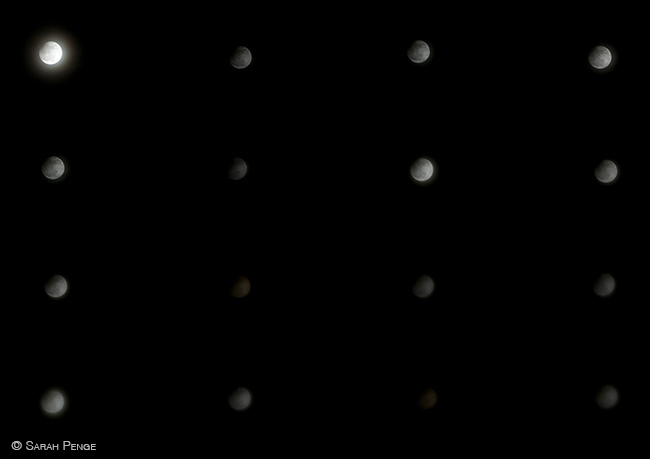
Time lapsed image from Ladispoli, Italy

== Eclipse details ==
Shown below is a table displaying details about this particular solar eclipse. It describes various parameters pertaining to this eclipse.

April 25, 2013 Lunar Eclipse Parameters
Parameter	Value
Penumbral Magnitude	0.98783
Umbral Magnitude	0.01596
Gamma	−1.01214
Sun Right Ascension	02h13m51.3s
Sun Declination	+13°26'35.0"
Sun Semi-Diameter	15'53.7"
Sun Equatorial Horizontal Parallax	08.7"
Moon Right Ascension	14h12m51.4s
Moon Declination	-14°25'34.1"
Moon Semi-Diameter	16'21.4"
Moon Equatorial Horizontal Parallax	1°00'01.6"
ΔT	67.1 s

== Eclipse season ==
This eclipse is part of an eclipse season, a period, roughly every six months, when eclipses occur. Only two (or occasionally three) eclipse seasons occur each year, and each season lasts about 35 days and repeats just short of six months (173 days) later; thus two full eclipse seasons always occur each year. Either two or three eclipses happen each eclipse season. In the sequence below, each eclipse is separated by a fortnight. The first and last eclipse in this sequence is separated by one synodic month.

Eclipse season of April–May 2013
April 25 Ascending node (full moon)	May 10 Descending node (new moon)	May 25 Ascending node (full moon)
Partial lunar eclipse Lunar Saros 112	Annular solar eclipse Solar Saros 138	Penumbral lunar eclipse Lunar Saros 150

== Related eclipses ==
=== Eclipses in 2013 ===
- A partial lunar eclipse on April 25.
- An annular solar eclipse on May 10.
- A penumbral lunar eclipse on May 25.
- A penumbral lunar eclipse on October 18.
- A hybrid solar eclipse on November 3.

=== Metonic ===
- Preceded by: Lunar eclipse of July 7, 2009
- Followed by: Lunar eclipse of February 11, 2017

=== Tzolkinex ===
- Preceded by: Lunar eclipse of March 14, 2006
- Followed by: Lunar eclipse of June 5, 2020

=== Half-Saros ===
- Preceded by: Solar eclipse of April 19, 2004
- Followed by: Solar eclipse of April 30, 2022

=== Tritos ===
- Preceded by: Lunar eclipse of May 26, 2002
- Followed by: Lunar eclipse of March 25, 2024

=== Lunar Saros 112 ===
- Preceded by: Lunar eclipse of April 15, 1995
- Followed by: Lunar eclipse of May 7, 2031

=== Inex ===
- Preceded by: Lunar eclipse of May 15, 1984
- Followed by: Lunar eclipse of April 5, 2042

=== Triad ===
- Preceded by: Lunar eclipse of June 25, 1926
- Followed by: Lunar eclipse of February 24, 2100

=== Lunar eclipses of 2013–2016 ===
This eclipse is a member of a semester series. An eclipse in a semester series of lunar eclipses repeats approximately every 177 days and 4 hours (a semester) at alternating nodes of the Moon's orbit.

The penumbral lunar eclipse on May 25, 2013 occurs in the previous lunar year eclipse set, and the penumbral lunar eclipse on August 18, 2016 occurs in the next lunar year eclipse set.

Lunar eclipse series sets from 2013 to 2016
Ascending node				Descending node			
Saros	Date Viewing	Type Chart	Gamma	Saros	Date Viewing	Type Chart	Gamma
112	2013 Apr 25	Partial	−1.0121	117	2013 Oct 18	Penumbral	1.1508
122	2014 Apr 15	Total	−0.3017	127	2014 Oct 08	Total	0.3827
132	2015 Apr 04	Total	0.4460	137	2015 Sep 28	Total	−0.3296
142	2016 Mar 23	Penumbral	1.1592	147	2016 Sep 16	Penumbral	−1.0549

=== Saros 112 ===
This eclipse is a part of Saros series 112, repeating every 18 years, 11 days, and containing 72 events. The series started with a penumbral lunar eclipse on May 20, 859 AD. It contains partial eclipses from August 3, 985 AD through March 8, 1346; total eclipses from March 18, 1364 through August 27, 1616; and a second set of partial eclipses from September 7, 1634 through April 25, 2013. The series ends at member 72 as a penumbral eclipse on July 12, 2139.

The longest duration of totality was produced by member 36 at 99 minutes, 51 seconds on June 2, 1490. All eclipses in this series occur at the Moon’s ascending node of orbit.

Greatest	First			
The greatest eclipse of the series occurred on 1490 Jun 02, lasting 99 minutes, 51 seconds.	Penumbral	Partial	Total	Central
The greatest eclipse of the series occurred on 1490 Jun 02, lasting 99 minutes, 51 seconds.	859 May 20	985 Aug 03	1364 Mar 18	1436 Apr 30
The greatest eclipse of the series occurred on 1490 Jun 02, lasting 99 minutes, 51 seconds.	Last			
The greatest eclipse of the series occurred on 1490 Jun 02, lasting 99 minutes, 51 seconds.	Central	Total	Partial	Penumbral
The greatest eclipse of the series occurred on 1490 Jun 02, lasting 99 minutes, 51 seconds.	1562 Jul 16	1616 Aug 27	2013 Apr 25	2139 Jul 12

Eclipses are tabulated in three columns; every third eclipse in the same column is one exeligmos apart, so they all cast shadows over approximately the same parts of the Earth.

Series members 54–72 occur between 1801 and 2139:
54	55	56
1814 Dec 26	1833 Jan 06	1851 Jan 17
57	58	59
1869 Jan 28	1887 Feb 08	1905 Feb 19
60	61	62
1923 Mar 03	1941 Mar 13	1959 Mar 24
63	64	65
1977 Apr 04	1995 Apr 15	2013 Apr 25
66	67	68
2031 May 07	2049 May 17	2067 May 28
69	70	71
2085 Jun 08	2103 Jun 20	2121 Jun 30
72
2139 Jul 12

=== Tritos series ===
This eclipse is a part of a tritos cycle, repeating at alternating nodes every 135 synodic months (≈ 3986.63 days, or 11 years minus 1 month). Their appearance and longitude are irregular due to a lack of synchronization with the anomalistic month (period of perigee), but groupings of 3 tritos cycles (≈ 33 years minus 3 months) come close (≈ 434.044 anomalistic months), so eclipses are similar in these groupings.

Series members between 1904 and 2200
1904 Mar 02 (Saros 102)	1915 Jan 31 (Saros 103)			
	1969 Aug 27 (Saros 108)	1980 Jul 27 (Saros 109)	1991 Jun 27 (Saros 110)	2002 May 26 (Saros 111)
2013 Apr 25 (Saros 112)	2024 Mar 25 (Saros 113)	2035 Feb 22 (Saros 114)	2046 Jan 22 (Saros 115)	2056 Dec 22 (Saros 116)
2067 Nov 21 (Saros 117)	2078 Oct 21 (Saros 118)	2089 Sep 19 (Saros 119)	2100 Aug 19 (Saros 120)	2111 Jul 21 (Saros 121)
2122 Jun 20 (Saros 122)	2133 May 19 (Saros 123)	2144 Apr 18 (Saros 124)	2155 Mar 19 (Saros 125)	2166 Feb 15 (Saros 126)
2177 Jan 14 (Saros 127)	2187 Dec 15 (Saros 128)	2198 Nov 13 (Saros 129)		

=== Inex series ===
This eclipse is a part of the long period inex cycle, repeating at alternating nodes, every 358 synodic months (≈ 10,571.95 days, or 29 years minus 20 days). Their appearance and longitude are irregular due to a lack of synchronization with the anomalistic month (period of perigee). However, groupings of 3 inex cycles (≈ 87 years minus 2 months) comes close (≈ 1,151.02 anomalistic months), so eclipses are similar in these groupings.

Series members between 1801 and 2200
1810 Sep 13 (Saros 105)	1839 Aug 24 (Saros 106)	1868 Aug 03 (Saros 107)
1897 Jul 14 (Saros 108)	1926 Jun 25 (Saros 109)	1955 Jun 05 (Saros 110)
1984 May 15 (Saros 111)	2013 Apr 25 (Saros 112)	2042 Apr 05 (Saros 113)
2071 Mar 16 (Saros 114)	2100 Feb 24 (Saros 115)	2129 Feb 04 (Saros 116)
2158 Jan 14 (Saros 117)	2186 Dec 26 (Saros 118)	

=== Half-Saros cycle ===
A lunar eclipse will be preceded and followed by solar eclipses by 9 years and 5.5 days (a half saros). This lunar eclipse is related to two partial solar eclipses of Solar Saros 119.

April 19, 2004	April 30, 2022

== See also ==
- List of lunar eclipses and List of 21st-century lunar eclipses
