= April 1995 lunar eclipse =

Partial lunar eclipse April 15, 1995

- Partial eclipse
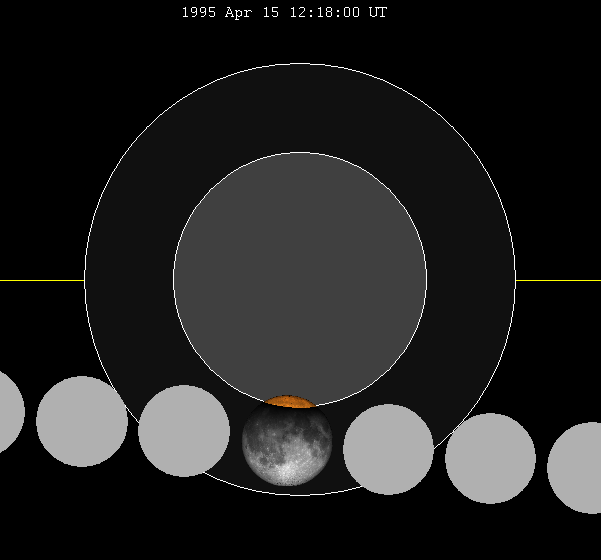
- The Moon's hourly motion shown right to left
- Date: April 15, 1995
- Gamma: −0.9594
- Magnitude: 0.1114
- Saros cycle: 112 (64 of 72)
- Partiality: 73 minutes, 0 seconds
- Penumbral: 256 minutes, 17 seconds
Contacts (UTC)
- P1: 10:09:57
- U1: 11:41:38
- Greatest: 12:18:03
- U4: 12:54:38
- P4: 14:26:14

A partial lunar eclipse occurred at the Moon’s ascending node of orbit on Saturday, April 15, 1995, with an umbral magnitude of 0.1114. A lunar eclipse occurs when the Moon moves into the Earth's shadow, causing the Moon to be darkened. A partial lunar eclipse occurs when one part of the Moon is in the Earth's umbra, while the other part is in the Earth's penumbra. Unlike a solar eclipse, which can only be viewed from a relatively small area of the world, a lunar eclipse may be viewed from anywhere on the night side of Earth. Occurring about 1.9 days before perigee (on April 17, 1995, at 9:20 UTC), the Moon's apparent diameter was larger.

It occurred on Easter Sunday (Gregorian only) the first for a lunar eclipse since March 1940.

== Visibility ==
The eclipse was completely visible over northeast Asia, Australia, and the western and central Pacific Ocean, seen rising over much of Asia and setting over North America and western South America.

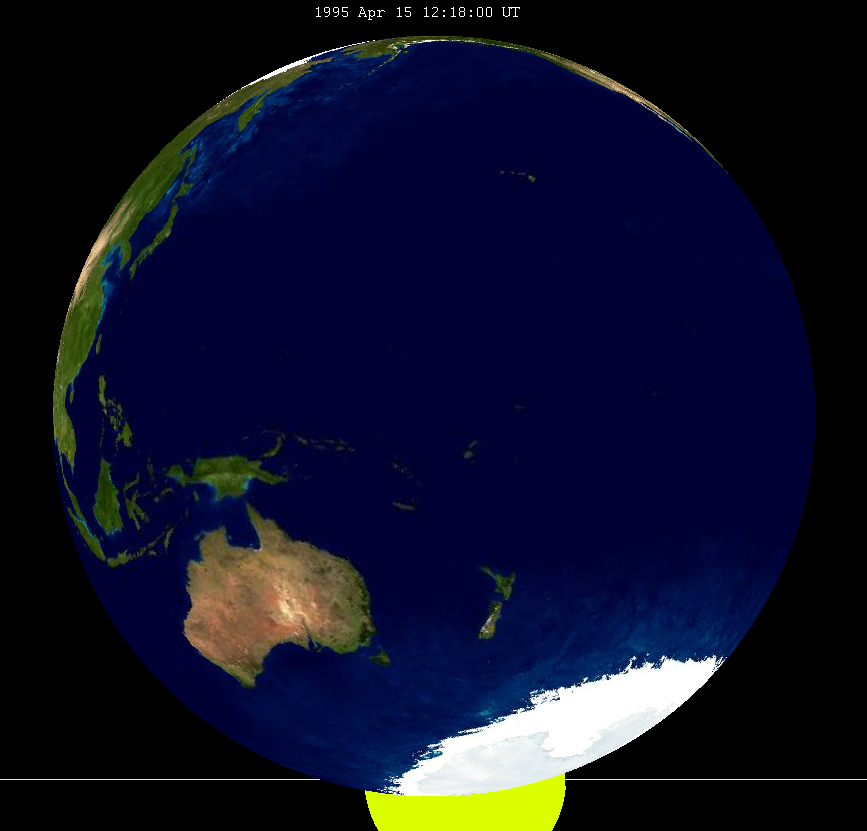
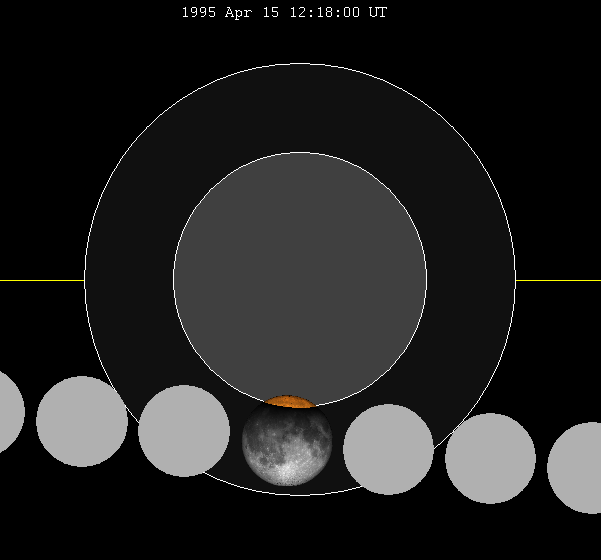

== Eclipse details ==
Shown below is a table displaying details about this particular lunar eclipse. It describes various parameters pertaining to this eclipse.

April 15, 1995 Lunar Eclipse Parameters
Parameter	Value
Penumbral Magnitude	1.08363
Umbral Magnitude	0.11142
Gamma	−0.95939
Sun Right Ascension	01h32m54.9s
Sun Declination	+09°42'10.2"
Sun Semi-Diameter	15'56.5"
Sun Equatorial Horizontal Parallax	08.8"
Moon Right Ascension	13h31m50.7s
Moon Declination	-10°37'41.7"
Moon Semi-Diameter	16'23.9"
Moon Equatorial Horizontal Parallax	1°00'10.8"
ΔT	61.0 s

== Eclipse season ==
This eclipse is part of an eclipse season, a period, roughly every six months, when eclipses occur. Only two (or occasionally three) eclipse seasons occur each year, and each season lasts about 35 days and repeats just short of six months (173 days) later; thus two full eclipse seasons always occur each year. Either two or three eclipses happen each eclipse season. In the sequence below, each eclipse is separated by a fortnight.

Eclipse season of April 1995
April 15 Ascending node (full moon)	April 29 Descending node (new moon)
Partial lunar eclipse Lunar Saros 112	Annular solar eclipse Solar Saros 138

== Related eclipses ==
=== Eclipses in 1995 ===
- A partial lunar eclipse on April 15.
- An annular solar eclipse on April 29.
- A penumbral lunar eclipse on October 8.
- A total solar eclipse on October 24.

=== Metonic ===
- Preceded by: Lunar eclipse of June 27, 1991
- Followed by: Lunar eclipse of January 31, 1999

=== Tzolkinex ===
- Preceded by: Lunar eclipse of March 3, 1988
- Followed by: Lunar eclipse of May 26, 2002

=== Half-Saros ===
- Preceded by: Solar eclipse of April 9, 1986
- Followed by: Solar eclipse of April 19, 2004

=== Tritos ===
- Preceded by: Lunar eclipse of May 15, 1984
- Followed by: Lunar eclipse of March 14, 2006

=== Lunar Saros 112 ===
- Preceded by: Lunar eclipse of April 4, 1977
- Followed by: Lunar eclipse of April 25, 2013

=== Inex ===
- Preceded by: Lunar eclipse of May 4, 1966
- Followed by: Lunar eclipse of March 25, 2024

=== Triad ===
- Preceded by: Lunar eclipse of June 14, 1908
- Followed by: Lunar eclipse of February 13, 2082

=== Lunar eclipses of 1995–1998 ===
This eclipse is a member of a semester series. An eclipse in a semester series of lunar eclipses repeats approximately every 177 days and 4 hours (a semester) at alternating nodes of the Moon's orbit.

The penumbral lunar eclipse on August 8, 1998 occurs in the next lunar year eclipse set.

Lunar eclipse series sets from 1995 to 1998
Ascending node				Descending node			
Saros	Date Viewing	Type Chart	Gamma	Saros	Date Viewing	Type Chart	Gamma
112	1995 Apr 15	Partial	−0.9594	117	1995 Oct 08	Penumbral	1.1179
122	1996 Apr 04	Total	−0.2534	127	1996 Sep 27	Total	0.3426
132	1997 Mar 24	Partial	0.4899	137	1997 Sep 16	Total	−0.3768
142	1998 Mar 13	Penumbral	1.1964	147	1998 Sep 06	Penumbral	−1.1058

=== Saros 112 ===
This eclipse is a part of Saros series 112, repeating every 18 years, 11 days, and containing 72 events. The series started with a penumbral lunar eclipse on May 20, 859 AD. It contains partial eclipses from August 3, 985 AD through March 8, 1346; total eclipses from March 18, 1364 through August 27, 1616; and a second set of partial eclipses from September 7, 1634 through April 25, 2013. The series ends at member 72 as a penumbral eclipse on July 12, 2139.

The longest duration of totality was produced by member 36 at 99 minutes, 51 seconds on June 2, 1490. All eclipses in this series occur at the Moon’s ascending node of orbit.

Greatest	First			
The greatest eclipse of the series occurred on 1490 Jun 02, lasting 99 minutes, 51 seconds.	Penumbral	Partial	Total	Central
The greatest eclipse of the series occurred on 1490 Jun 02, lasting 99 minutes, 51 seconds.	859 May 20	985 Aug 03	1364 Mar 18	1436 Apr 30
The greatest eclipse of the series occurred on 1490 Jun 02, lasting 99 minutes, 51 seconds.	Last			
The greatest eclipse of the series occurred on 1490 Jun 02, lasting 99 minutes, 51 seconds.	Central	Total	Partial	Penumbral
The greatest eclipse of the series occurred on 1490 Jun 02, lasting 99 minutes, 51 seconds.	1562 Jul 16	1616 Aug 27	2013 Apr 25	2139 Jul 12

Eclipses are tabulated in three columns; every third eclipse in the same column is one exeligmos apart, so they all cast shadows over approximately the same parts of the Earth.

Series members 54–72 occur between 1801 and 2139:
54	55	56
1814 Dec 26	1833 Jan 06	1851 Jan 17
57	58	59
1869 Jan 28	1887 Feb 08	1905 Feb 19
60	61	62
1923 Mar 03	1941 Mar 13	1959 Mar 24
63	64	65
1977 Apr 04	1995 Apr 15	2013 Apr 25
66	67	68
2031 May 07	2049 May 17	2067 May 28
69	70	71
2085 Jun 08	2103 Jun 20	2121 Jun 30
72
2139 Jul 12

=== Tritos series ===
This eclipse is a part of a tritos cycle, repeating at alternating nodes every 135 synodic months (≈ 3986.63 days, or 11 years minus 1 month). Their appearance and longitude are irregular due to a lack of synchronization with the anomalistic month (period of perigee), but groupings of 3 tritos cycles (≈ 33 years minus 3 months) come close (≈ 434.044 anomalistic months), so eclipses are similar in these groupings.

Series members between 1886 and 2200
1886 Feb 18 (Saros 102)	1897 Jan 18 (Saros 103)			
	1951 Aug 17 (Saros 108)	1962 Jul 17 (Saros 109)	1973 Jun 15 (Saros 110)	1984 May 15 (Saros 111)
1995 Apr 15 (Saros 112)	2006 Mar 14 (Saros 113)	2017 Feb 11 (Saros 114)	2028 Jan 12 (Saros 115)	2038 Dec 11 (Saros 116)
2049 Nov 09 (Saros 117)	2060 Oct 09 (Saros 118)	2071 Sep 09 (Saros 119)	2082 Aug 08 (Saros 120)	2093 Jul 08 (Saros 121)
2104 Jun 08 (Saros 122)	2115 May 08 (Saros 123)	2126 Apr 07 (Saros 124)	2137 Mar 07 (Saros 125)	2148 Feb 04 (Saros 126)
2159 Jan 04 (Saros 127)	2169 Dec 04 (Saros 128)	2180 Nov 02 (Saros 129)	2191 Oct 02 (Saros 130)	

=== Inex series ===
This eclipse is a part of the long period inex cycle, repeating at alternating nodes, every 358 synodic months (≈ 10,571.95 days, or 29 years minus 20 days). Their appearance and longitude are irregular due to a lack of synchronization with the anomalistic month (period of perigee). However, groupings of 3 inex cycles (≈ 87 years minus 2 months) comes close (≈ 1,151.02 anomalistic months), so eclipses are similar in these groupings.

Series members between 1801 and 2200
1821 Aug 13 (Saros 106)	1850 Jul 24 (Saros 107)	1879 Jul 03 (Saros 108)
1908 Jun 14 (Saros 109)	1937 May 25 (Saros 110)	1966 May 04 (Saros 111)
1995 Apr 15 (Saros 112)	2024 Mar 25 (Saros 113)	2053 Mar 04 (Saros 114)
2082 Feb 13 (Saros 115)	2111 Jan 25 (Saros 116)	2140 Jan 04 (Saros 117)
2168 Dec 14 (Saros 118)	2197 Nov 24 (Saros 119)	

=== Half-Saros cycle ===
A lunar eclipse will be preceded and followed by solar eclipses by 9 years and 5.5 days (a half saros). This lunar eclipse is related to two partial solar eclipses of Solar Saros 119.

April 9, 1986	April 19, 2004

== See also ==
- List of lunar eclipses
- List of 20th-century lunar eclipses
