= Lunar Saros 112 =

Eclipse cycle of the moon

Member 65
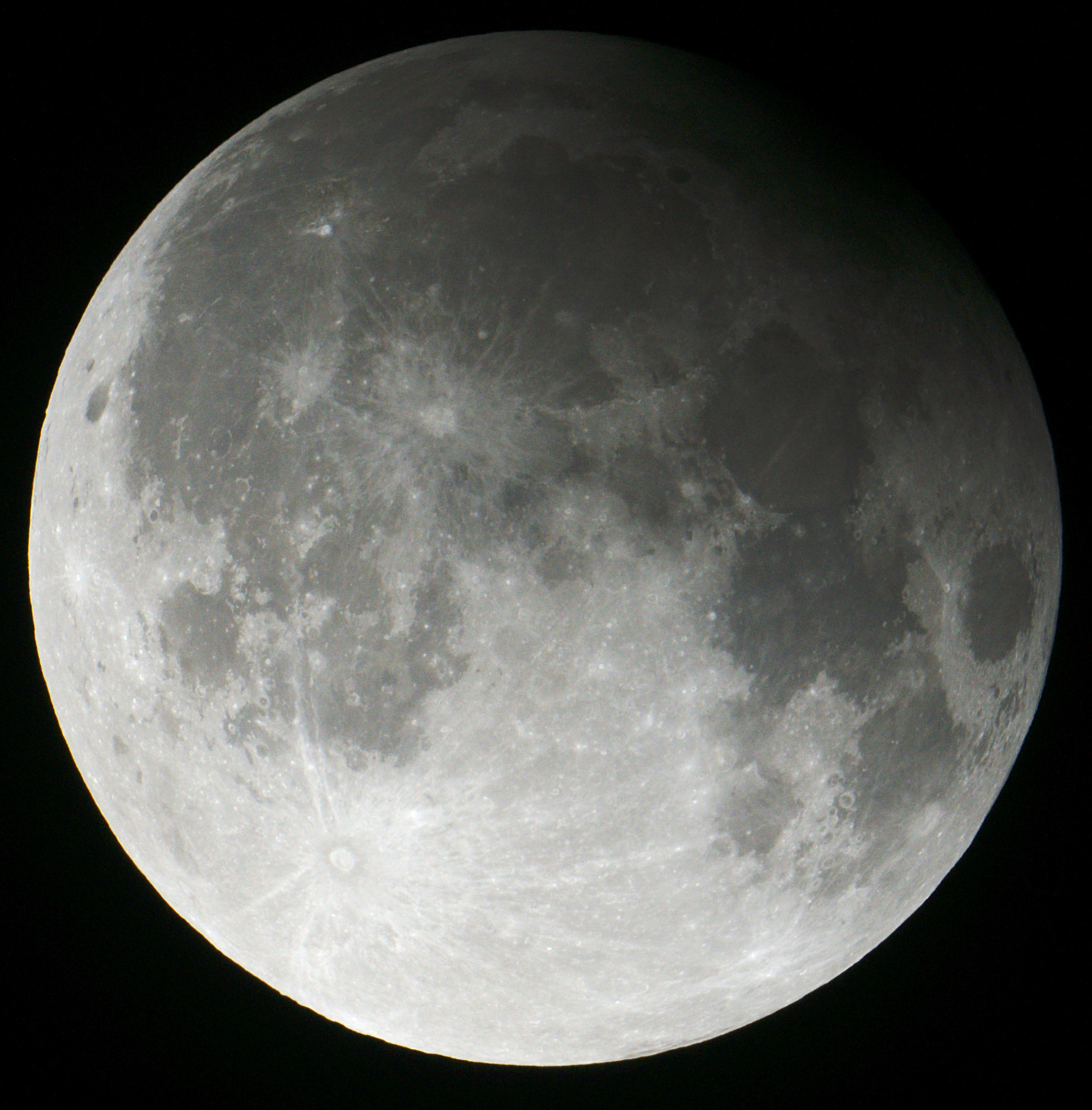
2013 Apr 25

Saros cycle series 112 for lunar eclipses occurs at the moon's ascending node, 18 years 11 and 1/3 days. It contains 72 events, with 15 total eclipses, starting in 1364 and ending in 1616. Solar Saros 119 interleaves with this lunar Saros with an event occurring every 9 years 5 days alternating between each saros series.

This lunar saros is linked to Solar Saros 119.

The series contains 15 total lunar eclipses between 1364 and 1616. It contains twenty-one partial eclipses from 985 AD to 1346 and twenty-two more between 1634 and 2013.

The last occurrence of this series was a partial lunar eclipse on April 25, 2013, which was the last partial lunar eclipse of this series. The next occurrence on May 7, 2031, will be the first of the final set of penumbral lunar eclipses.

The series started on May 20, 859 AD.

The series will end on July 12, 2139.

== Summary ==
Lunar Saros series 112, repeating every 18 years and 11 days, has a total of 72 lunar eclipse events including 15 total lunar eclipses.

First Penumbral Lunar Eclipse: 859 May 20

First Partial Lunar Eclipse: 985 Aug 03

First Total Lunar Eclipse: 1364 Mar 18

First Central Lunar Eclipse: 1436 Apr 30

Greatest Eclipse of the Lunar Saros 112: 1490 Jun 02

Last Central Lunar Eclipse: 1562 Jul 16

Last Total Lunar Eclipse: 1616 Aug 27

Last Partial Lunar Eclipse: 2013 Apr 25

Last Penumbral Lunar Eclipse: 2139 Jul 12

The greatest eclipse of the series occurred on 1490 Jun 02, lasting 100 minutes.

== List ==
Cat.	Saros	Mem	Date	Time UT (hr:mn)	Type	Gamma	Magnitude	Duration (min)			Contacts UT (hr:mn)						Chart
Cat.	Saros	Mem	Date	Greatest	Type	Gamma	Magnitude	Pen.	Par.	Tot.	P1	P4	U1	U2	U3	U4	Chart
06895	112	1	859 May 20	13:38:04	Penumbral	1.5700	-1.0461	8.1			13:34:01	13:42:07					
06936	112	2	877 May 30	20:15:13	Penumbral	1.4857	-0.8896	116.7			19:16:52	21:13:34					
06978	112	3	895 Jun 11	2:54:24	Penumbral	1.4018	-0.7339	161.9			1:33:27	4:15:21					
07019	112	4	913 Jun 21	9:33:25	Penumbral	1.3161	-0.5752	195.4			7:55:43	11:11:07					
07059	112	5	931 Jul 02	16:18:07	Penumbral	1.2335	-0.4225	220.9			14:27:40	18:08:34					
07100	112	6	949 Jul 12	23:05:38	Penumbral	1.1515	-0.2711	241.9			21:04:41	1:06:35					
07140	112	7	967 Jul 24	6:00:42	Penumbral	1.0745	-0.1291	258.7			3:51:21	8:10:03					
07181	112	8	985 Aug 03	13:01:16	Partial	1.0007	0.0068	272.5	19.5		10:45:01	15:17:31	12:51:31			13:11:01	
07225	112	9	1003 Aug 14	20:11:58	Partial	0.9340	0.1296	283.3	83.4		17:50:19	22:33:37	19:30:16			20:53:40	
07269	112	10	1021 Aug 25	3:30:44	Partial	0.8727	0.2423	292.1	111.9		1:04:41	5:56:47	2:34:47			4:26:41	
07313	112	11	1039 Sep 05	10:59:14	Partial	0.8183	0.3423	298.9	130.6		8:29:47	13:28:41	9:53:56			12:04:32	
07358	112	12	1057 Sep 15	18:37:43	Partial	0.7712	0.4287	304.1	143.8		16:05:40	21:09:46	17:25:49			19:49:37	
07402	112	13	1075 Sep 27	2:26:29	Partial	0.7320	0.5007	307.9	153.2		23:52:32	5:00:26	1:09:53			3:43:05	
07447	112	14	1093 Oct 07	10:25:02	Partial	0.6997	0.5601	310.6	160.0		7:49:44	13:00:20	9:05:02			11:45:02	
07493	112	15	1111 Oct 18	18:32:06	Partial	0.6737	0.608	312.4	165		15:55:54	21:08:18	17:09:36			19:54:36	
07539	112	16	1129 Oct 29	2:48:21	Partial	0.6544	0.6437	313.4	168.2		0:11:39	5:25:03	1:24:15			4:12:27	
07585	112	17	1147 Nov 9	11:11:45	Partial	0.6404	0.6699	313.8	170.4		8:34:51	13:48:39	9:46:33			12:36:57	
07633	112	18	1165 Nov 19	19:41:18	Partial	0.6307	0.6884	313.6	171.7		17:04:30	22:18:06	18:15:27			21:07:09	
07680	112	19	1183 Dec 1	4:15:19	Partial	0.6242	0.7013	313.1	172.4		1:38:46	6:51:52	2:49:07			5:41:31	
07726	112	20	1201 Dec 11	12:52:37	Partial	0.6196	0.7110	312.4	172.9		10:16:25	15:28:49	11:26:10			14:19:04	
07772	112	21	1219 Dec 22	21:30:57	Partial	0.6153	0.7203	311.6	173.3		18:55:09	0:06:45	20:04:18			22:57:36	
07818	112	22	1238 Jan 02	6:08:17	Partial	0.6096	0.7326	310.9	173.9		3:32:50	8:43:44	4:41:20			7:35:14	
07863	112	23	1256 Jan 13	14:44:04	Partial	0.6022	0.7483	310.4	174.9		12:08:52	17:19:16	13:16:37			16:11:31	
07907	112	24	1274 Jan 23	23:16:22	Partial	0.5916	0.7699	310.0	176.3		20:41:22	1:51:22	21:48:13			0:44:31	
07952	112	25	1292 Feb 04	7:43:14	Partial	0.5759	0.8012	310.0	178.4		5:08:14	10:18:14	6:14:02			9:12:26	
07997	112	26	1310 Feb 14	16:04:18	Partial	0.5548	0.8425	310.5	181.3		13:29:03	18:39:33	14:33:39			17:34:57	
08040	112	27	1328 Feb 26	0:18:42	Partial	0.5278	0.8948	311.2	184.7		21:43:06	2:54:18	22:46:21			1:51:03	
08081	112	28	1346 Mar 08	8:26:57	Partial	0.4951	0.9574	312.3	188.5		5:50:48	11:03:06	6:52:42			10:01:12	
08123	112	29	1364 Mar 18	16:26:32	Total	0.4548	1.0342	313.8	192.8	27.8	13:49:38	19:03:26	14:50:08	16:12:38	16:40:26	18:02:56	
08164	112	30	1382 Mar 30	0:20:27	Total	0.4091	1.1207	315.3	197.0	50.9	21:42:48	2:58:06	22:41:57	23:55:00	0:45:54	1:58:57	
08205	112	31	1400 Apr 09	8:06:51	Total	0.3562	1.2202	316.9	201.2	66.5	5:28:24	10:45:18	6:26:15	7:33:36	8:40:06	9:47:27	
08247	112	32	1418 Apr 20	15:48:18	Total	0.2987	1.3281	318.3	205.0	78.1	13:09:09	18:27:27	14:05:48	15:09:15	16:27:21	17:30:48	
08289	112	33	1436 Apr 30	23:23:12	Total	0.2351	1.4470	319.6	208.4	87.2	20:43:24	2:03:00	21:39:00	22:39:36	0:06:48	1:07:24	
08330	112	34	1454 May 12	6:55:11	Total	0.1683	1.5715	320.4	210.9	93.7	4:14:59	9:35:23	5:09:44	6:08:20	7:42:02	8:40:38	
08371	112	35	1472 May 22	14:23:05	Total	0.0973	1.7033	320.7	212.5	98.0	11:42:44	17:03:26	12:36:50	13:34:05	15:12:05	16:09:20	
08410	112	36	1490 Jun 02	21:49:13	Total	0.0243	1.8386	320.5	213.1	99.8	19:08:58	0:29:28	20:02:40	20:59:19	22:39:07	23:35:46	
08450	112	37	1508 Jun 13	5:14:02	Total	-0.0503	1.7918	319.6	212.6	99.4	2:34:14	7:53:50	3:27:44	4:24:20	6:03:44	7:00:20	
08491	112	38	1526 Jun 24	12:39:44	Total	-0.1248	1.6559	318.2	211.0	96.4	10:00:38	15:18:50	10:54:14	11:51:32	13:27:56	14:25:14	
08532	112	39	1544 Jul 04	20:06:57	Total	-0.1982	1.5216	316.1	208.3	90.9	17:28:54	22:45:00	18:22:48	19:21:30	20:52:24	21:51:06	
08575	112	40	1562 Jul 16	3:36:19	Total	-0.2701	1.3896	313.4	204.6	82.5	0:59:37	6:13:01	1:54:01	2:55:04	4:17:34	5:18:37	
08618	112	41	1580 Jul 26	11:09:58	Total	-0.3387	1.2635	310.3	200.0	70.8	8:34:49	13:45:07	9:29:58	10:34:34	11:45:22	12:49:58	
08662	112	42	1598 Aug 16	18:47:58	Total	-0.4040	1.1432	306.8	194.6	54.2	16:14:34	21:21:22	17:10:40	18:20:52	19:15:04	20:25:16	
08707	112	43	1616 Aug 27	2:31:49	Total	-0.4643	1.0318	303.1	188.6	26.4	0:00:16	5:03:22	0:57:31	2:18:37	2:45:01	4:06:07	
08751	112	44	1634 Sep 07	10:21:50	Partial	-0.5196	0.9293	299.3	182.2		7:52:11	12:51:29	8:50:44			11:52:56	
08795	112	45	1652 Sep 17	18:19:29	Partial	-0.5687	0.8381	295.6	175.7		15:51:41	20:47:17	16:51:38			19:47:20	
08840	112	46	1670 Sep 29	2:24:55	Partial	-0.6114	0.7583	292.2	169.3		23:58:49	4:51:01	1:00:16			3:49:34	
08886	112	47	1688 Oct 09	10:37:18	Partial	-0.6485	0.6888	289.1	163.2		8:12:45	13:01:51	9:15:42			11:58:54	
08932	112	48	1706 Oct 21	18:58:21	Partial	-0.6785	0.6323	286.4	157.8		16:35:09	21:21:33	17:39:27			20:17:15	
08979	112	49	1724 Nov 01	3:26:08	Partial	-0.7028	0.5863	284.3	153.1		1:03:59	5:48:17	2:09:35			4:42:41	
09025	112	50	1742 Nov 12	12:01:43	Partial	-0.7209	0.5517	282.7	149.4		9:40:22	14:23:04	10:47:01			13:16:25	
09072	112	51	1760 Nov 22	20:41:36	Partial	-0.7355	0.5236	281.5	146.2		18:20:51	23:02:21	19:28:30			21:54:42	
09118	112	52	1778 Dec 04	5:27:52	Partial	-0.7448	0.5054	280.9	144.1		3:07:25	7:48:19	4:15:49			6:39:55	
09163	112	53	1796 Dec 14	14:16:42	Partial	-0.7519	0.4915	280.5	142.5		11:56:27	16:36:57	13:05:27			15:27:57	
09208	112	54	1814 Dec 26	23:08:27	Partial	-0.7564	0.4825	280.3	141.5		20:48:18	1:28:36	21:57:42			0:19:12	
09254	112	55	1833 Jan 06	7:59:45	Partial	-0.7611	0.4733	280.2	140.5		5:39:39	10:19:51	6:49:30			9:10:00	
09301	112	56	1851 Jan 17	16:50:47	Partial	-0.7660	0.4642	280.0	139.5		14:30:47	19:10:47	15:41:02			18:00:32	
09345	112	57	1869 Jan 28	1:38:27	Partial	-0.7733	0.4507	279.5	137.9		23:18:42	3:58:12	0:29:30			2:47:24	
09388	112	58	1887 Feb 08	10:22:04	Partial	-0.7836	0.4317	278.7	135.6		8:02:43	12:41:25	9:14:16			11:29:52	
09431	112	59	1905 Feb 19	19:00:02	Partial	-0.7984	0.4049	277.2	132.1		16:41:26	21:18:38	17:53:59			20:06:05	
09473	112	60	1923 Mar 03	3:32:09	Partial	-0.8175	0.3701	275.2	127.1		1:14:33	5:49:45	2:28:36			4:35:42	
09515	112	61	1941 Mar 13	11:55:47	Partial	-0.8436	0.3226	272.2	119.8		9:39:41	14:11:53	10:55:53			12:55:41	
09556	112	62	1959 Mar 24	20:11:57	Partial	-0.8757	0.2643	268.2	109.5		17:57:51	22:26:03	19:17:12			21:06:42	
09597	112	63	1977 Apr 04	4:19:04	Partial	-0.9148	0.1928	262.9	94.7		2:07:37	6:30:31	3:31:43			5:06:25	
09638	112	64	1995 Apr 15	12:19:04	Partial	-0.9593	0.1114	256.3	73.0		10:10:55	14:27:13	11:42:34			12:55:34	
09679	112	65	2013 Apr 25	20:08:38	Partial	-1.0121	0.0148	247.7	27.0		18:04:47	22:12:29	19:55:08			20:22:08	
09720	112	66	2031 May 07	3:52:02	Penumbral	-1.0694	-0.0904	237.3			1:53:23	5:50:41					
09760	112	67	2049 May 17	11:26:39	Penumbral	-1.1337	-0.2085	224.3			9:34:30	13:18:48					
09801	112	68	2067 May 28	18:56:08	Penumbral	-1.2012	-0.3329	208.5			17:11:53	20:40:23					
09842	112	69	2085 Jun 08	2:17:36	Penumbral	-1.2745	-0.4682	188.5			0:43:21	3:51:51					
09884	112	70	2103 Jun 20	9:36:11	Penumbral	-1.3492	-0.6062	163.9			8:14:14	10:58:08					
09926	112	71	2121 Jun 30	16:49:52	Penumbral	-1.4272	-0.7505	131.0			15:44:22	17:55:22					
09969	112	72	2139 Jul 12	0:01:45	Penumbral	-1.5055	-0.8957	81.9			23:20:48	0:42:42					

== See also ==
- List of lunar eclipses
  - List of Saros series for lunar eclipses
