= Lunar Saros 111 =

Series of lunar eclipses

Member 67
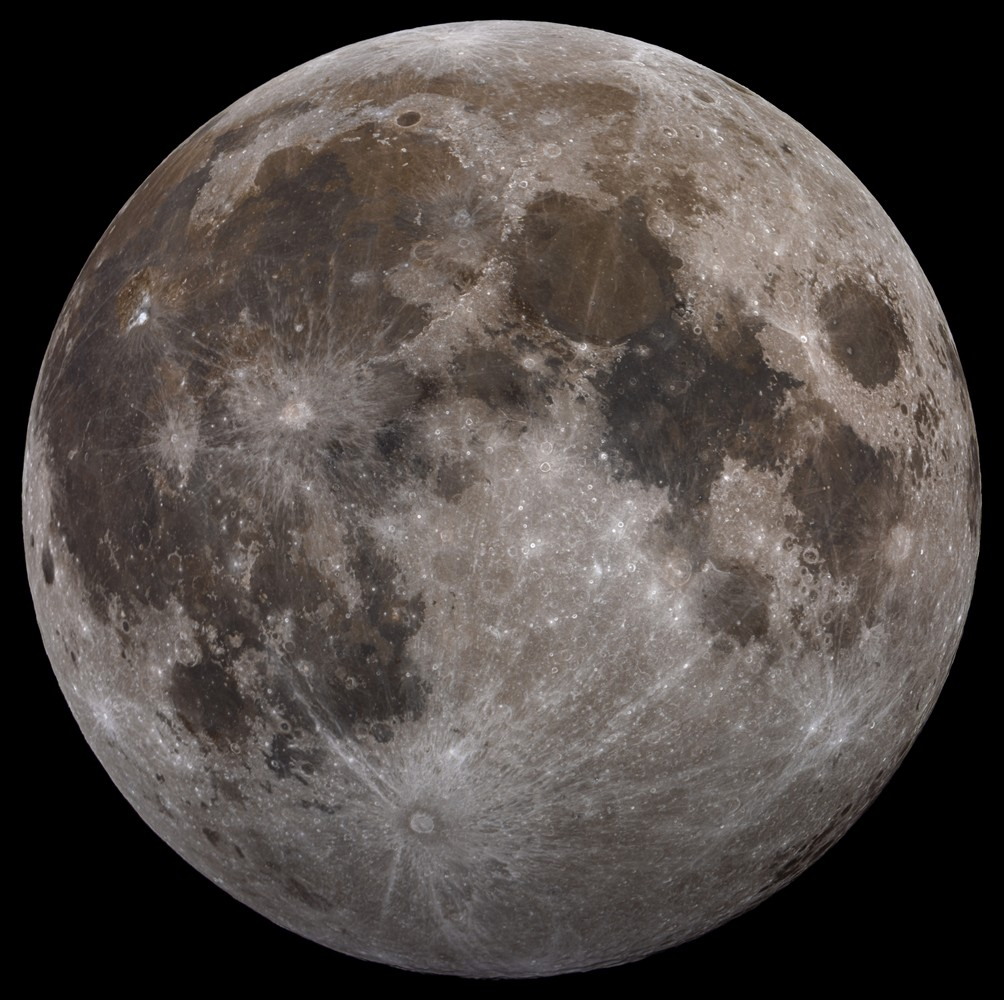
2020 Jun 05

Saros cycle series 111 for lunar eclipses occurs at the moon's descending node, repeats every 18 years 11 and 1/3 days. It contains 71 events.

The first total lunar eclipse of this series was on April 19, 1353, and last was on August 4, 1533. The longest occurrence of this series was on June 12, 1443 when the totality lasted 106 minutes.

Cat.	Saros	Mem	Date	Time UT (hr:mn)	Type	Gamma	Magnitude	Duration (min)			Contacts UT (hr:mn)						Chart
Cat.	Saros	Mem	Date	Greatest	Type	Gamma	Magnitude	Pen.	Par.	Tot.	P1	P4	U1	U2	U3	U4	Chart
06830	111	1	830 Jun 10	6:33:54	Penumbral	-1.5398	-0.9806	63.1			6:02:21	7:05:27					
06870	111	2	848 Jun 20	13:19:57	Penumbral	-1.4660	-0.8468	125.2			12:17:21	14:22:33					
06911	111	3	866 Jul 01	20:03:56	Penumbral	-1.3912	-0.7116	164.7			18:41:35	21:26:17					
06952	111	4	884 Jul 12	2:49:55	Penumbral	-1.3183	-0.5801	194.7			1:12:34	4:27:16					
06994	111	5	902 Jul 23	9:37:09	Penumbral	-1.2466	-0.4510	219.5			7:47:24	11:26:54					
07034	111	6	920 Aug 02	16:29:26	Penumbral	-1.1794	-0.3302	239.7			14:29:35	18:29:17					
07075	111	7	938 Aug 13	23:26:21	Penumbral	-1.1163	-0.2172	256.7			21:18:00	1:34:42					
07116	111	8	956 Aug 24	6:28:59	Penumbral	-1.0582	-0.1135	271.0			4:13:29	8:44:29					
07157	111	9	974 Sep 04	13:38:51	Penumbral	-1.0065	-0.0215	282.8			11:17:27	16:00:15					
07198	111	10	992 Sep 14	20:56:23	Partial	-0.9615	0.0584	292.6	58.4		18:30:05	23:22:41	20:27:11			21:25:35	
07242	111	11	1010 Sep 26	4:21:48	Partial	-0.9230	0.1262	300.6	85.2		1:51:30	6:52:06	3:39:12			5:04:24	
07287	111	12	1028 Oct 06	11:54:42	Partial	-0.8911	0.1821	307.1	101.7		9:21:09	14:28:15	11:03:51			12:45:33	
07331	111	13	1046 Oct 17	19:35:27	Partial	-0.8660	0.2258	312.2	112.7		16:59:21	22:11:33	18:39:06			20:31:48	
07375	111	14	1064 Oct 28	3:23:09	Partial	-0.8469	0.2587	316.2	120.3		0:45:03	6:01:15	2:23:00			4:23:18	
07419	111	15	1082 Nov 08	11:16:05	Partial	-0.8323	0.2835	319.3	125.6		8:36:26	13:55:44	10:13:17			12:18:53	
07465	111	16	1100 Nov 18	19:14:28	Partial	-0.8223	0.3003	321.6	129.2		16:33:40	21:55:16	18:09:52			20:19:04	
07511	111	17	1118 Nov 30	3:16:19	Partial	-0.815	0.3124	323.3	131.6		0:34:40	5:57:58	2:10:31			4:22:07	
07557	111	18	1136 Dec 10	11:19:58	Partial	-0.8096	0.3216	324.6	133.5		8:37:40	14:02:16	10:13:13			12:26:43	
07604	111	19	1154 Dec 21	19:22:51	Partial	-0.8036	0.3322	325.9	135.6		16:39:54	22:05:48	18:15:03			20:30:39	
07652	111	20	1173 Jan 1	3:24:43	Partial	-0.7967	0.3448	327.1	138		0:41:10	6:08:16	2:15:43			4:33:43	
07698	111	21	1191 Jan 12	11:23:18	Partial	-0.7869	0.3631	328.6	141.3		8:39:00	14:07:36	10:12:39			12:33:57	
07744	111	22	1209 Jan 22	19:16:05	Partial	-0.7725	0.3903	330.5	146.0		16:30:50	22:01:20	18:03:05			20:29:05	
07790	111	23	1227 Feb 03	3:02:49	Partial	-0.7531	0.4269	333.0	151.9		0:16:19	5:49:19	1:46:52			4:18:46	
07835	111	24	1245 Feb 13	10:41:36	Partial	-0.7272	0.4757	336.0	159.1		7:53:36	13:29:36	9:22:03			12:01:09	
07880	111	25	1263 Feb 24	18:12:42	Partial	-0.6950	0.5364	339.5	167.4		15:22:57	21:02:27	16:49:00			19:36:24	
07925	111	26	1281 Mar 07	1:33:37	Partial	-0.6542	0.6128	343.6	176.7		22:41:49	4:25:25	0:05:16			3:01:58	
07970	111	27	1299 Mar 18	8:46:35	Partial	-0.6068	0.7016	348.0	186.2		5:52:35	11:40:35	7:13:29			10:19:41	
08014	111	28	1317 Mar 28	15:49:55	Partial	-0.5516	0.8048	352.6	195.8		12:53:37	18:46:13	14:12:01			17:27:49	
08057	111	29	1335 Apr 08	22:45:02	Partial	-0.4893	0.9209	357.1	205.0		19:46:29	1:43:35	21:02:32			0:27:32	
08099	111	30	1353 Apr 19	5:32:00	Total	-0.4201	1.0498	361.4	213.5	36.4	2:31:18	8:32:42	3:45:15	5:13:48	5:50:12	7:18:45	
08140	111	31	1371 Apr 30	12:13:03	Total	-0.3457	1.1879	365.0	220.9	67.6	9:10:33	15:15:33	10:22:36	11:39:15	12:46:51	14:03:30	
08181	111	32	1389 May 10	18:48:43	Total	-0.2665	1.3350	367.9	226.8	85.6	15:44:46	21:52:40	16:55:19	18:05:55	19:31:31	20:42:07	
08222	111	33	1407 May 22	1:19:29	Total	-0.1827	1.4902	369.9	231.2	97.2	22:14:32	4:24:26	23:23:53	0:30:53	2:08:05	3:15:05	
08263	111	34	1425 Jun 01	7:48:18	Total	-0.0970	1.6488	370.9	233.8	103.8	4:42:51	10:53:45	5:51:24	6:56:24	8:40:12	9:45:12	
08305	111	35	1443 Jun 12	14:15:52	Total	-0.0098	1.8097	370.7	234.6	106.2	11:10:31	17:21:13	12:18:34	13:22:46	15:08:58	16:13:10	
08346	111	36	1461 Jun 22	20:44:43	Total	0.0770	1.6874	369.4	233.5	104.6	17:40:01	23:49:25	18:47:58	19:52:25	21:37:01	22:41:28	
08386	111	37	1479 Jul 04	3:14:45	Total	0.1634	1.5297	366.9	230.6	98.8	0:11:18	6:18:12	1:19:27	2:25:21	4:04:09	5:10:03	
08426	111	38	1497 Jul 14	9:49:55	Total	0.2462	1.3783	363.5	226.1	88.8	6:48:10	12:51:40	7:56:52	9:05:31	10:34:19	11:42:58	
08466	111	39	1515 Jul 25	16:29:57	Total	0.3252	1.2336	359.2	220.1	73.4	13:30:21	19:29:33	14:39:54	15:53:15	17:06:39	18:20:00	
08507	111	40	1533 Aug 04	23:16:00	Total	0.3999	1.0967	354.1	212.8	49.4	20:18:57	2:13:03	21:29:36	22:51:18	23:40:42	1:02:24	
08549	111	41	1551 Aug 16	6:09:51	Partial	0.4688	0.9702	348.7	204.5		3:15:30	9:04:12	4:27:36			7:52:06	
08593	111	42	1569 Aug 26	13:12:21	Partial	0.5313	0.8556	342.9	195.6		10:20:54	16:03:48	11:34:33			14:50:09	
08636	111	43	1587 Sep 16	20:25:05	Partial	0.5857	0.7555	337.3	186.6		17:36:26	23:13:44	18:51:47			21:58:23	
08679	111	44	1605 Sep 27	3:46:02	Partial	0.6341	0.6666	331.8	177.4		1:00:08	6:31:56	2:17:20			5:14:44	
08724	111	45	1623 Oct 08	11:18:42	Partial	0.6734	0.5941	326.8	169.1		8:35:18	14:02:06	9:54:09			12:43:15	
08768	111	46	1641 Oct 18	19:00:25	Partial	0.7062	0.5340	322.2	161.4		16:19:19	21:41:31	17:39:43			20:21:07	
08813	111	47	1659 Oct 30	2:52:52	Partial	0.7310	0.4885	318.4	155.1		0:13:40	5:32:04	1:35:19			4:10:25	
08858	111	48	1677 Nov 09	10:52:40	Partial	0.7504	0.4529	315.1	149.7		8:15:07	13:30:13	9:37:49			12:07:31	
08904	111	49	1695 Nov 20	19:02:06	Partial	0.7629	0.4303	312.6	146.0		16:25:48	21:38:24	17:49:06			20:15:06	
08950	111	50	1713 Dec 02	3:17:09	Partial	0.7716	0.4149	310.5	143.4		0:41:54	5:52:24	2:05:27			4:28:51	
08997	111	51	1731 Dec 13	11:38:06	Partial	0.7764	0.4069	308.8	141.7		9:03:42	14:12:30	10:27:15			12:48:57	
09044	111	52	1749 Dec 23	20:02:11	Partial	0.7796	0.4023	307.3	140.6		17:28:32	22:35:50	18:51:53			21:12:29	
09091	111	53	1768 Jan 04	4:29:31	Partial	0.7810	0.4011	305.9	140.1		1:56:34	7:02:28	3:19:28			5:39:34	
09136	111	54	1786 Jan 14	12:55:56	Partial	0.7838	0.3978	304.2	139.1		10:23:50	15:28:02	11:46:23			14:05:29	
09181	111	55	1804 Jan 26	21:21:21	Partial	0.7882	0.3918	302.3	137.8		18:50:12	23:52:30	20:12:27			22:30:15	
09226	111	56	1822 Feb 06	5:43:26	Partial	0.7961	0.3797	299.9	135.6		3:13:29	8:13:23	4:35:38			6:51:14	
09272	111	57	1840 Feb 17	14:02:34	Partial	0.8074	0.3615	297.0	132.3		11:34:04	16:31:04	12:56:25			15:08:43	
09317	111	58	1858 Feb 27	22:14:20	Partial	0.8252	0.3316	293.0	126.9		19:47:50	0:40:50	21:10:53			23:17:47	
09361	111	59	1876 Mar 10	6:21:31	Partial	0.8474	0.2937	288.4	119.7		3:57:19	8:45:43	5:21:40			7:21:22	
09405	111	60	1894 Mar 21	14:20:27	Partial	0.8770	0.2424	282.6	109.3		11:59:09	16:41:45	13:25:48			15:15:06	
09447	111	61	1912 Apr 01	22:14:16	Partial	0.9116	0.1820	275.8	95.2		19:56:22	0:32:10	21:26:40			23:01:52	
09489	111	62	1930 Apr 13	5:58:54	Partial	0.9545	0.1064	267.3	73.4		3:45:15	8:12:33	5:22:12			6:35:36	
09531	111	63	1948 Apr 23	13:39:18	Partial	1.0016	0.0229	257.6	34.3		11:30:30	15:48:06	13:22:09			13:56:27	
09572	111	64	1966 May 04	21:12:06	Penumbral	1.0553	-0.0728	246.0			19:09:06	23:15:06					
09613	111	65	1984 May 15	4:41:03	Penumbral	1.1130	-0.1760	232.5			2:44:48	6:37:18					
09654	111	66	2002 May 26	12:04:26	Penumbral	1.1758	-0.2888	216.6			10:16:08	13:52:44					
09695	111	67	2020 Jun 05	19:26:14	Penumbral	1.2406	-0.4053	198.2			17:47:08	21:05:20					
09736	111	68	2038 Jun 17	2:45:02	Penumbral	1.3082	-0.5275	176.3			1:16:53	4:13:11					
09776	111	69	2056 Jun 27	10:03:09	Penumbral	1.3769	-0.6519	149.9			8:48:12	11:18:06					
09817	111	70	2074 Jul 08	17:21:38	Penumbral	1.4456	-0.7765	116.6			16:23:20	18:19:56					
09858	111	71	2092 Jul 19	0:41:58	Penumbral	1.5131	-0.8992	67.7			0:08:07	1:15:49					

== See also ==
- List of lunar eclipses
  - List of Saros series for lunar eclipses
