= June 2038 lunar eclipse =

Astronomical event

- Penumbral eclipse
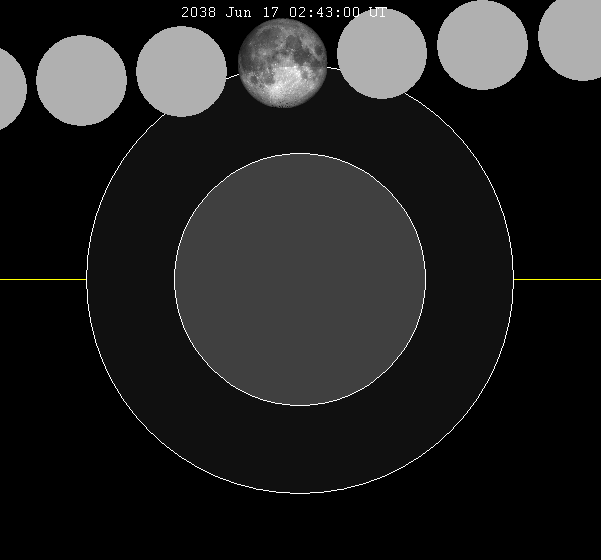
- The Moon's hourly motion shown right to left
- Date: June 17, 2038
- Gamma: 1.3082
- Magnitude: −0.5259
- Saros cycle: 111 (68 of 71)
- Penumbral: 176 minutes, 24 seconds
Contacts (UTC)
- P1: 1:15:27
- Greatest: 2:43:44
- P4: 4:11:50

A penumbral lunar eclipse will occur at the Moon's descending node of orbit on Thursday, June 17, 2038, with an umbral magnitude of −0.5259. A lunar eclipse occurs when the Moon moves into the Earth's shadow, causing the Moon to be darkened. A penumbral lunar eclipse occurs when part or all of the Moon's near side passes into the Earth's penumbra. Unlike a solar eclipse, which can only be viewed from a relatively small area of the world, a lunar eclipse may be viewed from anywhere on the night side of Earth. Occurring about 2.7 days after perigee (on June 14, 2038, at 11:30 UTC), the Moon's apparent diameter will be larger.

This eclipse will be the second of four penumbral lunar eclipses in 2038, with the others occurring on January 21, July 16, and December 11.

== Visibility ==
The eclipse will be completely visible over eastern North America, South America, west and southern Africa, and western Europe, seen rising over western North America and the eastern Pacific Ocean and setting over northeast Africa, eastern Europe, and the Middle East.

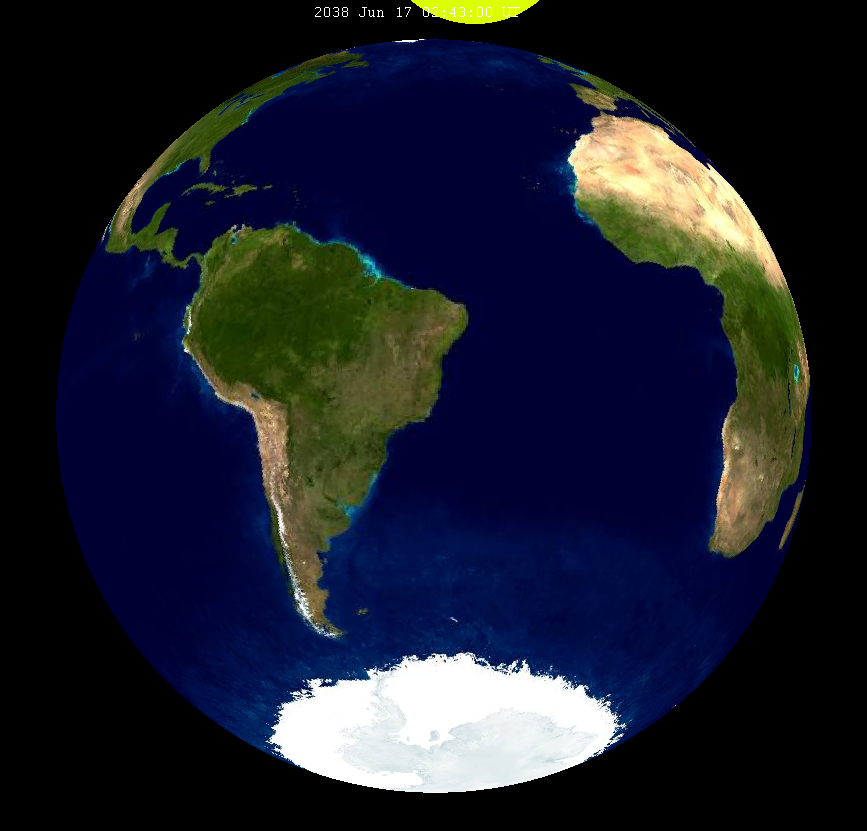
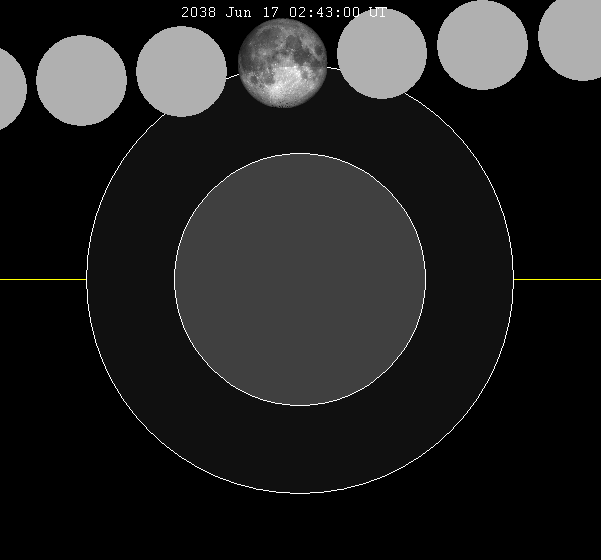

== Eclipse details ==
Shown below is a table displaying details about this particular solar eclipse. It describes various parameters pertaining to this eclipse.

June 17, 2038 Lunar Eclipse Parameters
Parameter	Value
Penumbral Magnitude	0.44376
Umbral Magnitude	−0.52587
Gamma	1.30828
Sun Right Ascension	05h42m46.1s
Sun Declination	+23°22'28.6"
Sun Semi-Diameter	15'44.7"
Sun Equatorial Horizontal Parallax	08.7"
Moon Right Ascension	17h43m28.2s
Moon Declination	-22°05'07.2"
Moon Semi-Diameter	16'14.3"
Moon Equatorial Horizontal Parallax	0°59'35.6"
ΔT	78.2 s

== Eclipse season ==
This eclipse is part of an eclipse season, a period, roughly every six months, when eclipses occur. Only two (or occasionally three) eclipse seasons occur each year, and each season lasts about 35 days and repeats just short of six months (173 days) later; thus two full eclipse seasons always occur each year. Either two or three eclipses happen each eclipse season. In the sequence below, each eclipse is separated by a fortnight. The first and last eclipse in this sequence is separated by one synodic month.

Eclipse season of June–July 2038
June 17 Descending node (full moon)	July 2 Ascending node (new moon)	July 16 Descending node (full moon)
Penumbral lunar eclipse Lunar Saros 111	Annular solar eclipse Solar Saros 137	Penumbral lunar eclipse Lunar Saros 149

== Related eclipses ==
=== Eclipses in 2038 ===
- An annular solar eclipse on January 5.
- A penumbral lunar eclipse on January 21.
- A penumbral lunar eclipse on June 17.
- An annular solar eclipse on July 2.
- A penumbral lunar eclipse on July 16.
- A penumbral lunar eclipse on December 11.
- A total solar eclipse on December 26.

=== Metonic ===
- Followed by: Lunar eclipse of April 5, 2042

=== Tzolkinex ===
- Preceded by: Lunar eclipse of May 7, 2031

=== Half-Saros ===
- Preceded by: Solar eclipse of June 12, 2029
- Followed by: Solar eclipse of June 23, 2047

=== Tritos ===
- Preceded by: Lunar eclipse of July 18, 2027
- Followed by: Lunar eclipse of May 17, 2049

=== Lunar Saros 111 ===
- Preceded by: Lunar eclipse of June 5, 2020
- Followed by: Lunar eclipse of June 27, 2056

=== Inex ===
- Preceded by: Lunar eclipse of July 7, 2009
- Followed by: Lunar eclipse of May 28, 2067

=== Triad ===
- Preceded by: Lunar eclipse of August 17, 1951
- Followed by: Lunar eclipse of April 18, 2125

=== Lunar eclipses of 2038–2042 ===
This eclipse is a member of a semester series. An eclipse in a semester series of lunar eclipses repeats approximately every 177 days and 4 hours (a semester) at alternating nodes of the Moon's orbit.

The penumbral lunar eclipses on January 21, 2038 and July 16, 2038 occur in the previous lunar year eclipse set, and the penumbral lunar eclipses on April 5, 2042 and September 29, 2042 occur in the next lunar year eclipse set.

Lunar eclipse series sets from 2038 to 2042
Descending node				Ascending node			
Saros	Date Viewing	Type Chart	Gamma	Saros	Date Viewing	Type Chart	Gamma
111	2038 Jun 17	Penumbral	1.3082	116	2038 Dec 11	Penumbral	−1.1448
121	2039 Jun 06	Partial	0.5460	126	2039 Nov 30	Partial	−0.4721
131	2040 May 26	Total	−0.1872	136	2040 Nov 18	Total	0.2361
141	2041 May 16	Partial	−0.9746	146	2041 Nov 08	Partial	0.9212
				156	2042 Oct 28	Penumbral	−

=== Saros 111 ===
This eclipse is a part of Saros series 111, repeating every 18 years, 11 days, and containing 71 events. The series started with a penumbral lunar eclipse on June 10, 830 AD. It contains partial eclipses from September 14, 992 AD through April 8, 1335; total eclipses from April 19, 1353 through August 4, 1533; and a second set of partial eclipses from August 16, 1551 through April 23, 1948. The series ends at member 71 as a penumbral eclipse on July 19, 2092.

The longest duration of totality was produced by member 35 at 106 minutes, 14 seconds on June 12, 1443. All eclipses in this series occur at the Moon’s descending node of orbit.

Greatest	First			
The greatest eclipse of the series occurred on 1443 Jun 12, lasting 106 minutes, 14 seconds.	Penumbral	Partial	Total	Central
The greatest eclipse of the series occurred on 1443 Jun 12, lasting 106 minutes, 14 seconds.	830 Jun 10	992 Sep 14	1353 Apr 19	1389 May 10
The greatest eclipse of the series occurred on 1443 Jun 12, lasting 106 minutes, 14 seconds.	Last			
The greatest eclipse of the series occurred on 1443 Jun 12, lasting 106 minutes, 14 seconds.	Central	Total	Partial	Penumbral
The greatest eclipse of the series occurred on 1443 Jun 12, lasting 106 minutes, 14 seconds.	1497 Jul 14	1533 Aug 04	1948 Apr 23	2092 Jul 19

Eclipses are tabulated in three columns; every third eclipse in the same column is one exeligmos apart, so they all cast shadows over approximately the same parts of the Earth.

Series members 55–71 occur between 1801 and 2092:
55	56	57
1804 Jan 26	1822 Feb 06	1840 Feb 17
58	59	60
1858 Feb 27	1876 Mar 10	1894 Mar 21
61	62	63
1912 Apr 01	1930 Apr 13	1948 Apr 23
64	65	66
1966 May 04	1984 May 15	2002 May 26
67	68	69
2020 Jun 05	2038 Jun 17	2056 Jun 27
70	71	
2074 Jul 08	2092 Jul 19	

=== Tritos series ===
This eclipse is a part of a tritos cycle, repeating at alternating nodes every 135 synodic months (≈ 3986.63 days, or 11 years minus 1 month). Their appearance and longitude are irregular due to a lack of synchronization with the anomalistic month (period of perigee), but groupings of 3 tritos cycles (≈ 33 years minus 3 months) come close (≈ 434.044 anomalistic months), so eclipses are similar in these groupings.

Series members between 1940 and 2200
1940 Mar 23 (Saros 102)	1951 Feb 21 (Saros 103)			
			2027 Jul 18 (Saros 110)	2038 Jun 17 (Saros 111)
2049 May 17 (Saros 112)	2060 Apr 15 (Saros 113)	2071 Mar 16 (Saros 114)	2082 Feb 13 (Saros 115)	2093 Jan 12 (Saros 116)
2103 Dec 13 (Saros 117)	2114 Nov 12 (Saros 118)	2125 Oct 12 (Saros 119)	2136 Sep 10 (Saros 120)	2147 Aug 11 (Saros 121)
2158 Jul 11 (Saros 122)	2169 Jun 09 (Saros 123)	2180 May 09 (Saros 124)	2191 Apr 09 (Saros 125)	

=== Inex series ===
This eclipse is a part of the long period inex cycle, repeating at alternating nodes, every 358 synodic months (≈ 10,571.95 days, or 29 years minus 20 days). Their appearance and longitude are irregular due to a lack of synchronization with the anomalistic month (period of perigee). However, groupings of 3 inex cycles (≈ 87 years minus 2 months) comes close (≈ 1,151.02 anomalistic months), so eclipses are similar in these groupings.

Series members between 1801 and 2200
1806 Nov 26 (Saros 103)		1864 Oct 15 (Saros 105)
1893 Sep 25 (Saros 106)		1951 Aug 17 (Saros 108)
1980 Jul 27 (Saros 109)	2009 Jul 07 (Saros 110)	2038 Jun 17 (Saros 111)
2067 May 28 (Saros 112)	2096 May 07 (Saros 113)	2125 Apr 18 (Saros 114)
2154 Mar 29 (Saros 115)	2183 Mar 09 (Saros 116)	

=== Half-Saros cycle ===
A lunar eclipse will be preceded and followed by solar eclipses by 9 years and 5.5 days (a half saros). This lunar eclipse is related to two total solar eclipses of Solar Saros 118.

June 12, 2029	June 23, 2047

== See also ==
- List of lunar eclipses and List of 21st-century lunar eclipses
