= May 2002 lunar eclipse =

Penumbral lunar eclipse 26 May 2002

- Penumbral eclipse
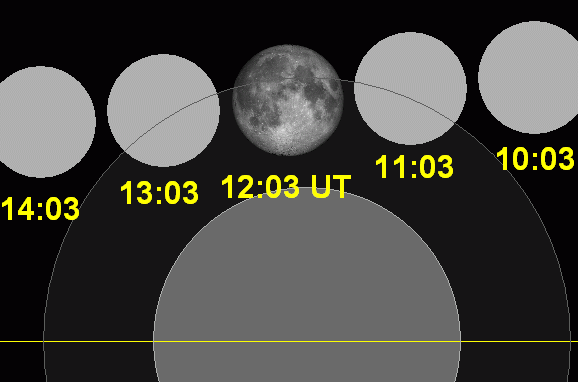
- Hourly motion shown right to left
- Date: May 26, 2002
- Gamma: 1.1758
- Magnitude: −0.2871
- Saros cycle: 111 (66 of 71)
- Penumbral: 216 minutes, 34 seconds
Contacts (UTC)
- P1: 10:15:00
- Greatest: 12:03:22
- P4: 13:51:34

A penumbral lunar eclipse occurred at the Moon’s descending node of orbit on Sunday, May 26, 2002, with an umbral magnitude of −0.2871. A lunar eclipse occurs when the Moon moves into the Earth's shadow, causing the Moon to be darkened. A penumbral lunar eclipse occurs when part or all of the Moon's near side passes into the Earth's penumbra. Unlike a solar eclipse, which can only be viewed from a relatively small area of the world, a lunar eclipse may be viewed from anywhere on the night side of Earth. Occurring about 3.1 days after perigee (on May 23, 2002, at 11:30 UTC), the Moon's apparent diameter was larger.

== Visibility ==
The eclipse was completely visible over Australia, the Pacific Ocean, and Antarctica, seen rising over much of Asia and setting over much of North America and western South America.

The moon's hourly motion across the Earth's shadow in the constellation of Scorpius.

== In popular culture ==
This eclipse appears in the 2022 film Turning Red, although it differs from actual events. It is depicted as taking place on the evening of 25 May, rather than the early morning hours of 26 May. Additionally, the film takes place in Toronto, where the eclipse was not visible.

== Eclipse details ==
Shown below is a table displaying details about this particular lunar eclipse. It describes various parameters pertaining to this eclipse.

May 26, 2002 Lunar Eclipse Parameters
Parameter	Value
Penumbral Magnitude	0.69104
Umbral Magnitude	−0.28705
Gamma	1.17591
Sun Right Ascension	04h12m31.0s
Sun Declination	+21°08'37.3"
Sun Semi-Diameter	15'47.3"
Sun Equatorial Horizontal Parallax	08.7"
Moon Right Ascension	16h13m52.1s
Moon Declination	-20°01'35.7"
Moon Semi-Diameter	16'08.5"
Moon Equatorial Horizontal Parallax	0°59'14.5"
ΔT	64.3 s

== Eclipse season ==
This eclipse is part of an eclipse season, a period, roughly every six months, when eclipses occur. Only two (or occasionally three) eclipse seasons occur each year, and each season lasts about 35 days and repeats just short of six months (173 days) later; thus two full eclipse seasons always occur each year. Either two or three eclipses happen each eclipse season. In the sequence below, each eclipse is separated by a fortnight. The first and last eclipse in this sequence is separated by one synodic month.

Eclipse season of May–June 2002
May 26 Descending node (full moon)	June 10 Ascending node (new moon)	June 24 Descending node (full moon)
Penumbral lunar eclipse Lunar Saros 111	Annular solar eclipse Solar Saros 137	Penumbral lunar eclipse Lunar Saros 149

== Related eclipses ==
=== Eclipses in 2002 ===
- A penumbral lunar eclipse on May 26.
- An annular solar eclipse on June 10.
- A penumbral lunar eclipse on June 24.
- A penumbral lunar eclipse on November 20.
- A total solar eclipse on December 4.

=== Metonic ===
- Preceded by: Lunar eclipse of August 8, 1998
- Followed by: Lunar eclipse of March 14, 2006

=== Tzolkinex ===
- Preceded by: Lunar eclipse of April 15, 1995
- Followed by: Lunar eclipse of July 7, 2009

=== Half-Saros ===
- Preceded by: Solar eclipse of May 21, 1993
- Followed by: Solar eclipse of June 1, 2011

=== Tritos ===
- Preceded by: Lunar eclipse of June 27, 1991
- Followed by: Lunar eclipse of April 25, 2013

=== Lunar Saros 111 ===
- Preceded by: Lunar eclipse of May 15, 1984
- Followed by: Lunar eclipse of June 5, 2020

=== Inex ===
- Preceded by: Lunar eclipse of June 15, 1973
- Followed by: Lunar eclipse of May 7, 2031

=== Triad ===
- Preceded by: Lunar eclipse of July 26, 1915
- Followed by: Lunar eclipse of March 26, 2089

=== Lunar eclipses of 2002–2005 ===
This eclipse is a member of a semester series. An eclipse in a semester series of lunar eclipses repeats approximately every 177 days and 4 hours (a semester) at alternating nodes of the Moon's orbit.

The penumbral lunar eclipse on June 24, 2002 occurs in the previous lunar year eclipse set.

Lunar eclipse series sets from 2002 to 2005
Descending node				Ascending node			
Saros	Date Viewing	Type Chart	Gamma	Saros	Date Viewing	Type Chart	Gamma
111	2002 May 26	Penumbral	1.1759	116	2002 Nov 20	Penumbral	−1.1127
121	2003 May 16	Total	0.4123	126	2003 Nov 09	Total	−0.4319
131	2004 May 04	Total	−0.3132	136	2004 Oct 28	Total	0.2846
141	2005 Apr 24	Penumbral	−1.0885	146	2005 Oct 17	Partial	0.9796

=== Metonic series ===
First eclipse: May 26, 2002. Second eclipse: 26 May 2021. Third eclipse: 26 May 2040. Fourth eclipse: 27 May 2059.

=== Saros 111 ===
This eclipse is a part of Saros series 111, repeating every 18 years, 11 days, and containing 71 events. The series started with a penumbral lunar eclipse on June 10, 830 AD. It contains partial eclipses from September 14, 992 AD through April 8, 1335; total eclipses from April 19, 1353 through August 4, 1533; and a second set of partial eclipses from August 16, 1551 through April 23, 1948. The series ends at member 71 as a penumbral eclipse on July 19, 2092.

The longest duration of totality was produced by member 35 at 106 minutes, 14 seconds on June 12, 1443. All eclipses in this series occur at the Moon’s descending node of orbit.

Greatest	First			
The greatest eclipse of the series occurred on 1443 Jun 12, lasting 106 minutes, 14 seconds.	Penumbral	Partial	Total	Central
The greatest eclipse of the series occurred on 1443 Jun 12, lasting 106 minutes, 14 seconds.	830 Jun 10	992 Sep 14	1353 Apr 19	1389 May 10
The greatest eclipse of the series occurred on 1443 Jun 12, lasting 106 minutes, 14 seconds.	Last			
The greatest eclipse of the series occurred on 1443 Jun 12, lasting 106 minutes, 14 seconds.	Central	Total	Partial	Penumbral
The greatest eclipse of the series occurred on 1443 Jun 12, lasting 106 minutes, 14 seconds.	1497 Jul 14	1533 Aug 04	1948 Apr 23	2092 Jul 19

Eclipses are tabulated in three columns; every third eclipse in the same column is one exeligmos apart, so they all cast shadows over approximately the same parts of the Earth.

Series members 55–71 occur between 1801 and 2092:
55	56	57
1804 Jan 26	1822 Feb 06	1840 Feb 17
58	59	60
1858 Feb 27	1876 Mar 10	1894 Mar 21
61	62	63
1912 Apr 01	1930 Apr 13	1948 Apr 23
64	65	66
1966 May 04	1984 May 15	2002 May 26
67	68	69
2020 Jun 05	2038 Jun 17	2056 Jun 27
70	71	
2074 Jul 08	2092 Jul 19	

=== Tritos series ===
This eclipse is a part of a tritos cycle, repeating at alternating nodes every 135 synodic months (≈ 3986.63 days, or 11 years minus 1 month). Their appearance and longitude are irregular due to a lack of synchronization with the anomalistic month (period of perigee), but groupings of 3 tritos cycles (≈ 33 years minus 3 months) come close (≈ 434.044 anomalistic months), so eclipses are similar in these groupings.

Series members between 1904 and 2200
1904 Mar 02 (Saros 102)	1915 Jan 31 (Saros 103)			
	1969 Aug 27 (Saros 108)	1980 Jul 27 (Saros 109)	1991 Jun 27 (Saros 110)	2002 May 26 (Saros 111)
2013 Apr 25 (Saros 112)	2024 Mar 25 (Saros 113)	2035 Feb 22 (Saros 114)	2046 Jan 22 (Saros 115)	2056 Dec 22 (Saros 116)
2067 Nov 21 (Saros 117)	2078 Oct 21 (Saros 118)	2089 Sep 19 (Saros 119)	2100 Aug 19 (Saros 120)	2111 Jul 21 (Saros 121)
2122 Jun 20 (Saros 122)	2133 May 19 (Saros 123)	2144 Apr 18 (Saros 124)	2155 Mar 19 (Saros 125)	2166 Feb 15 (Saros 126)
2177 Jan 14 (Saros 127)	2187 Dec 15 (Saros 128)	2198 Nov 13 (Saros 129)		

=== Inex series ===
This eclipse is a part of the long period inex cycle, repeating at alternating nodes, every 358 synodic months (≈ 10,571.95 days, or 29 years minus 20 days). Their appearance and longitude are irregular due to a lack of synchronization with the anomalistic month (period of perigee). However, groupings of 3 inex cycles (≈ 87 years minus 2 months) comes close (≈ 1,151.02 anomalistic months), so eclipses are similar in these groupings.

Series members between 1801 and 2200
1828 Sep 23 (Saros 105)	1857 Sep 04 (Saros 106)	1886 Aug 14 (Saros 107)
1915 Jul 26 (Saros 108)	1944 Jul 06 (Saros 109)	1973 Jun 15 (Saros 110)
2002 May 26 (Saros 111)	2031 May 07 (Saros 112)	2060 Apr 15 (Saros 113)
2089 Mar 26 (Saros 114)	2118 Mar 07 (Saros 115)	2147 Feb 15 (Saros 116)
2176 Jan 26 (Saros 117)

=== Half-Saros cycle ===
A lunar eclipse will be preceded and followed by solar eclipses by 9 years and 5.5 days (a half saros). This lunar eclipse is related to two partial solar eclipses of Solar Saros 118.

May 21, 1993	June 1, 2011

== See also ==
- List of lunar eclipses
- List of 21st-century lunar eclipses
