= April 1930 lunar eclipse =

Partial lunar eclipse in 1930

- Partial eclipse
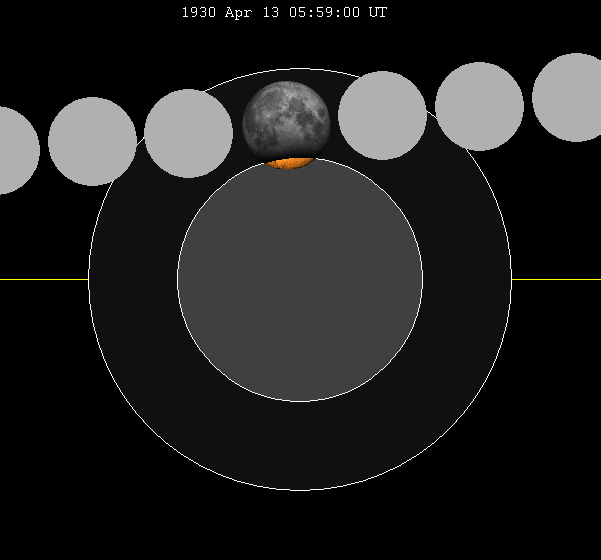
- The Moon's hourly motion shown right to left
- Date: April 13, 1930
- Gamma: 0.9545
- Magnitude: 0.1065
- Saros cycle: 111 (62 of 71)
- Partiality: 73 minutes, 22 seconds
- Penumbral: 267 minutes, 18 seconds
Contacts (UTC)
- P1: 3:44:47
- U1: 5:21:43
- Greatest: 5:58:30
- U4: 6:35:04
- P4: 8:12:06

A partial lunar eclipse occurred at the Moon’s descending node of orbit on Sunday, April 13, 1930, with an umbral magnitude of 0.1065. A lunar eclipse occurs when the Moon moves into the Earth's shadow, causing the Moon to be darkened. A partial lunar eclipse occurs when one part of the Moon is in the Earth's umbra, while the other part is in the Earth's penumbra. Unlike a solar eclipse, which can only be viewed from a relatively small area of the world, a lunar eclipse may be viewed from anywhere on the night side of Earth. Occurring about 3.8 days after perigee (on April 9, 1930, at 11:20 UTC), the Moon's apparent diameter was larger.

== Visibility ==
The eclipse was completely visible over North and South America, seen rising over eastern Australia and the central Pacific Ocean and setting over much of Europe and Africa.

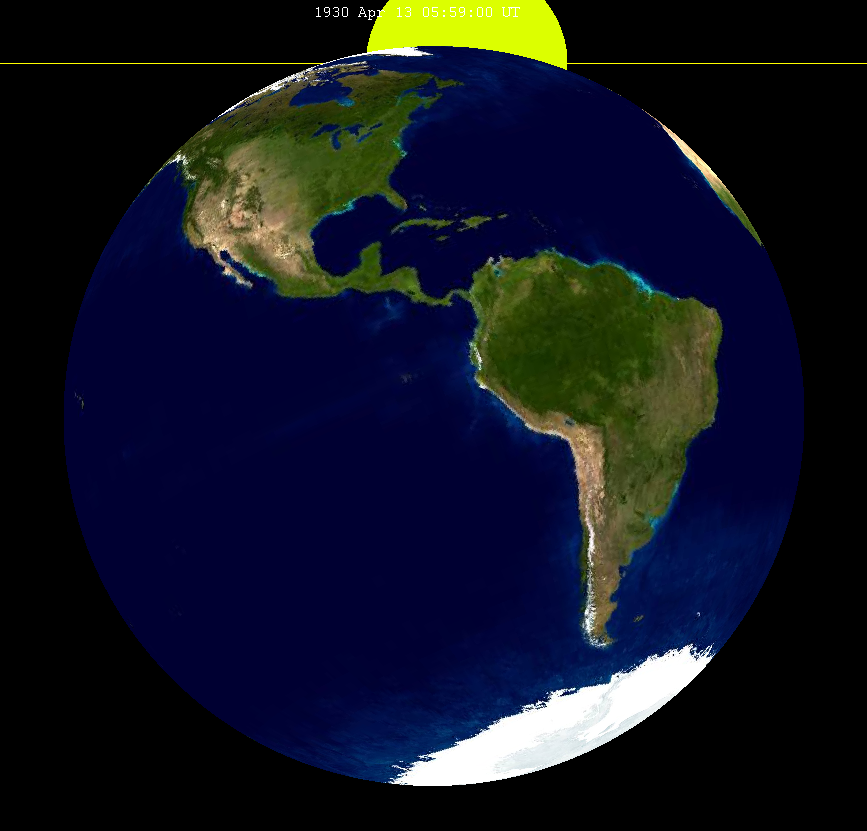
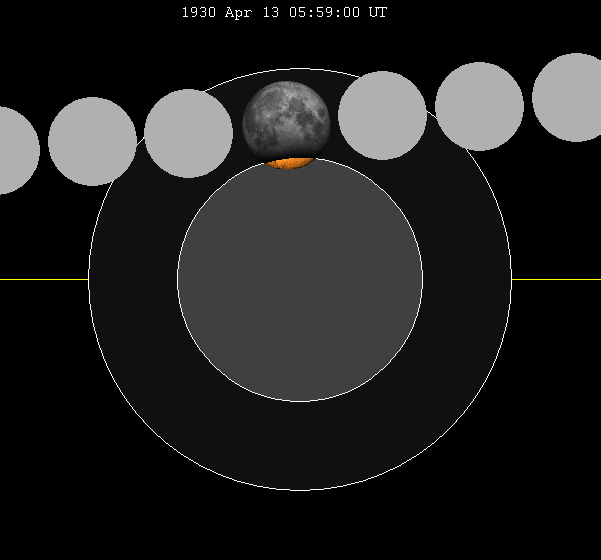

== Eclipse details ==
Shown below is a table displaying details about this particular solar eclipse. It describes various parameters pertaining to this eclipse.

April 13, 1930 Lunar Eclipse Parameters
Parameter	Value
Penumbral Magnitude	1.10669
Umbral Magnitude	0.10650
Gamma	0.95452
Sun Right Ascension	01h23m32.1s
Sun Declination	+08°47'25.3"
Sun Semi-Diameter	15'56.9"
Sun Equatorial Horizontal Parallax	08.8"
Moon Right Ascension	13h25m16.0s
Moon Declination	-07°57'49.4"
Moon Semi-Diameter	15'56.7"
Moon Equatorial Horizontal Parallax	0°58'31.2"
ΔT	24.1 s

== Eclipse season ==
This eclipse is part of an eclipse season, a period, roughly every six months, when eclipses occur. Only two (or occasionally three) eclipse seasons occur each year, and each season lasts about 35 days and repeats just short of six months (173 days) later; thus two full eclipse seasons always occur each year. Either two or three eclipses happen each eclipse season. In the sequence below, each eclipse is separated by a fortnight.

Eclipse season of April 1930
April 13 Descending node (full moon)	April 28 Ascending node (new moon)
Partial lunar eclipse Lunar Saros 111	Hybrid solar eclipse Solar Saros 137

== Related eclipses ==
=== Eclipses in 1930 ===
- A partial lunar eclipse on April 13.
- A hybrid solar eclipse on April 28.
- A partial lunar eclipse on October 7.
- A total solar eclipse on October 21.

=== Metonic ===
- Preceded by: Lunar eclipse of June 25, 1926
- Followed by: Lunar eclipse of January 30, 1934

=== Tzolkinex ===
- Preceded by: Lunar eclipse of March 3, 1923
- Followed by: Lunar eclipse of May 25, 1937

=== Half-Saros ===
- Preceded by: Solar eclipse of April 8, 1921
- Followed by: Solar eclipse of April 19, 1939

=== Tritos ===
- Preceded by: Lunar eclipse of May 15, 1919
- Followed by: Lunar eclipse of March 13, 1941

=== Lunar Saros 111 ===
- Preceded by: Lunar eclipse of April 1, 1912
- Followed by: Lunar eclipse of April 23, 1948

=== Inex ===
- Preceded by: Lunar eclipse of May 3, 1901
- Followed by: Lunar eclipse of March 24, 1959

=== Triad ===
- Preceded by: Lunar eclipse of June 12, 1843
- Followed by: Lunar eclipse of February 11, 2017

=== Lunar eclipses of 1930–1933 ===
This eclipse is a member of a semester series. An eclipse in a semester series of lunar eclipses repeats approximately every 177 days and 4 hours (a semester) at alternating nodes of the Moon's orbit.

The penumbral lunar eclipses on February 10, 1933 and August 5, 1933 occur in the next lunar year eclipse set.

Lunar eclipse series sets from 1930 to 1933
Descending node				Ascending node			
Saros	Date Viewing	Type Chart	Gamma	Saros	Date Viewing	Type Chart	Gamma
111	1930 Apr 13	Partial	0.9545	116	1930 Oct 07	Partial	−0.9812
121	1931 Apr 02	Total	0.2043	126	1931 Sep 26	Total	−0.2698
131	1932 Mar 22	Partial	−0.4956	136	1932 Sep 14	Partial	0.4664
141	1933 Mar 12	Penumbral	−1.2369	146	1933 Sep 04	Penumbral	1.1776

=== Saros 111 ===
This eclipse is a part of Saros series 111, repeating every 18 years, 11 days, and containing 71 events. The series started with a penumbral lunar eclipse on June 10, 830 AD. It contains partial eclipses from September 14, 992 AD through April 8, 1335; total eclipses from April 19, 1353 through August 4, 1533; and a second set of partial eclipses from August 16, 1551 through April 23, 1948. The series ends at member 71 as a penumbral eclipse on July 19, 2092.

The longest duration of totality was produced by member 35 at 106 minutes, 14 seconds on June 12, 1443. All eclipses in this series occur at the Moon’s descending node of orbit.

Greatest	First			
The greatest eclipse of the series occurred on 1443 Jun 12, lasting 106 minutes, 14 seconds.	Penumbral	Partial	Total	Central
The greatest eclipse of the series occurred on 1443 Jun 12, lasting 106 minutes, 14 seconds.	830 Jun 10	992 Sep 14	1353 Apr 19	1389 May 10
The greatest eclipse of the series occurred on 1443 Jun 12, lasting 106 minutes, 14 seconds.	Last			
The greatest eclipse of the series occurred on 1443 Jun 12, lasting 106 minutes, 14 seconds.	Central	Total	Partial	Penumbral
The greatest eclipse of the series occurred on 1443 Jun 12, lasting 106 minutes, 14 seconds.	1497 Jul 14	1533 Aug 04	1948 Apr 23	2092 Jul 19

Eclipses are tabulated in three columns; every third eclipse in the same column is one exeligmos apart, so they all cast shadows over approximately the same parts of the Earth.

Series members 55–71 occur between 1801 and 2092:
55	56	57
1804 Jan 26	1822 Feb 06	1840 Feb 17
58	59	60
1858 Feb 27	1876 Mar 10	1894 Mar 21
61	62	63
1912 Apr 01	1930 Apr 13	1948 Apr 23
64	65	66
1966 May 04	1984 May 15	2002 May 26
67	68	69
2020 Jun 05	2038 Jun 17	2056 Jun 27
70	71	
2074 Jul 08	2092 Jul 19	

=== Tritos series ===
This eclipse is a part of a tritos cycle, repeating at alternating nodes every 135 synodic months (≈ 3986.63 days, or 11 years minus 1 month). Their appearance and longitude are irregular due to a lack of synchronization with the anomalistic month (period of perigee), but groupings of 3 tritos cycles (≈ 33 years minus 3 months) come close (≈ 434.044 anomalistic months), so eclipses are similar in these groupings.

Series members between 1801 and 2200
1810 Mar 21 (Saros 100)	1821 Feb 17 (Saros 101)	1832 Jan 17 (Saros 102)	1842 Dec 17 (Saros 103)	
1864 Oct 15 (Saros 105)	1875 Sep 15 (Saros 106)	1886 Aug 14 (Saros 107)	1897 Jul 14 (Saros 108)	1908 Jun 14 (Saros 109)
1919 May 15 (Saros 110)	1930 Apr 13 (Saros 111)	1941 Mar 13 (Saros 112)	1952 Feb 11 (Saros 113)	1963 Jan 09 (Saros 114)
1973 Dec 10 (Saros 115)	1984 Nov 08 (Saros 116)	1995 Oct 08 (Saros 117)	2006 Sep 07 (Saros 118)	2017 Aug 07 (Saros 119)
2028 Jul 06 (Saros 120)	2039 Jun 06 (Saros 121)	2050 May 06 (Saros 122)	2061 Apr 04 (Saros 123)	2072 Mar 04 (Saros 124)
2083 Feb 02 (Saros 125)	2094 Jan 01 (Saros 126)	2104 Dec 02 (Saros 127)	2115 Nov 02 (Saros 128)	2126 Oct 01 (Saros 129)
2137 Aug 30 (Saros 130)	2148 Jul 31 (Saros 131)	2159 Jun 30 (Saros 132)	2170 May 30 (Saros 133)	2181 Apr 29 (Saros 134)
2192 Mar 28 (Saros 135)

=== Inex series ===
This eclipse is a part of the long period inex cycle, repeating at alternating nodes, every 358 synodic months (≈ 10,571.95 days, or 29 years minus 20 days). Their appearance and longitude are irregular due to a lack of synchronization with the anomalistic month (period of perigee). However, groupings of 3 inex cycles (≈ 87 years minus 2 months) comes close (≈ 1,151.02 anomalistic months), so eclipses are similar in these groupings.

Series members between 1801 and 2200
1814 Jul 02 (Saros 107)	1843 Jun 12 (Saros 108)	1872 May 22 (Saros 109)
1901 May 03 (Saros 110)	1930 Apr 13 (Saros 111)	1959 Mar 24 (Saros 112)
1988 Mar 03 (Saros 113)	2017 Feb 11 (Saros 114)	2046 Jan 22 (Saros 115)
2075 Jan 02 (Saros 116)	2103 Dec 13 (Saros 117)	2132 Nov 23 (Saros 118)
2161 Nov 03 (Saros 119)	2190 Oct 13 (Saros 120)	

=== Half-Saros cycle ===
A lunar eclipse will be preceded and followed by solar eclipses by 9 years and 5.5 days (a half saros). This lunar eclipse is related to two total solar eclipses of Solar Saros 118.

April 8, 1921	April 19, 1939

== See also ==
- List of lunar eclipses
- List of 20th-century lunar eclipses
