= May 2031 lunar eclipse =

Penumbral

- Penumbral eclipse
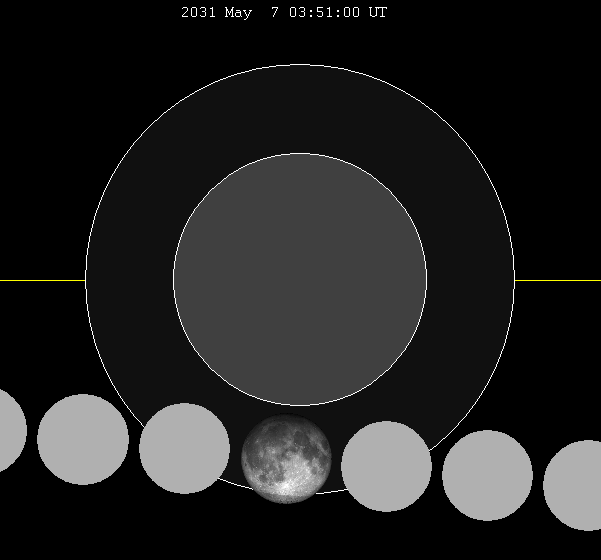
- The Moon's hourly motion shown right to left
- Date: May 7, 2031
- Gamma: −1.0694
- Magnitude: −0.0892
- Saros cycle: 112 (66 of 72)
- Penumbral: 237 minutes, 21 seconds
Contacts (UTC)
- P1: 1:52:06
- Greatest: 3:41:03
- P4: 5:49:27

A penumbral lunar eclipse will occur at the Moon’s ascending node of orbit on Wednesday, May 7, 2031, with an umbral magnitude of −0.0892. A lunar eclipse occurs when the Moon moves into the Earth's shadow, causing the Moon to be darkened. A penumbral lunar eclipse occurs when part or all of the Moon's near side passes into the Earth's penumbra. Unlike a solar eclipse, which can only be viewed from a relatively small area of the world, a lunar eclipse may be viewed from anywhere on the night side of Earth. Occurring about 2 days before perigee (on May 9, 2031, at 3:35 UTC), the Moon's apparent diameter will be larger.

== Visibility ==
The eclipse will be completely visible over eastern North America, South America, Antarctica, and west Africa, seen rising over western North America and the eastern Pacific Ocean and setting over Africa, Europe, and the Middle East.

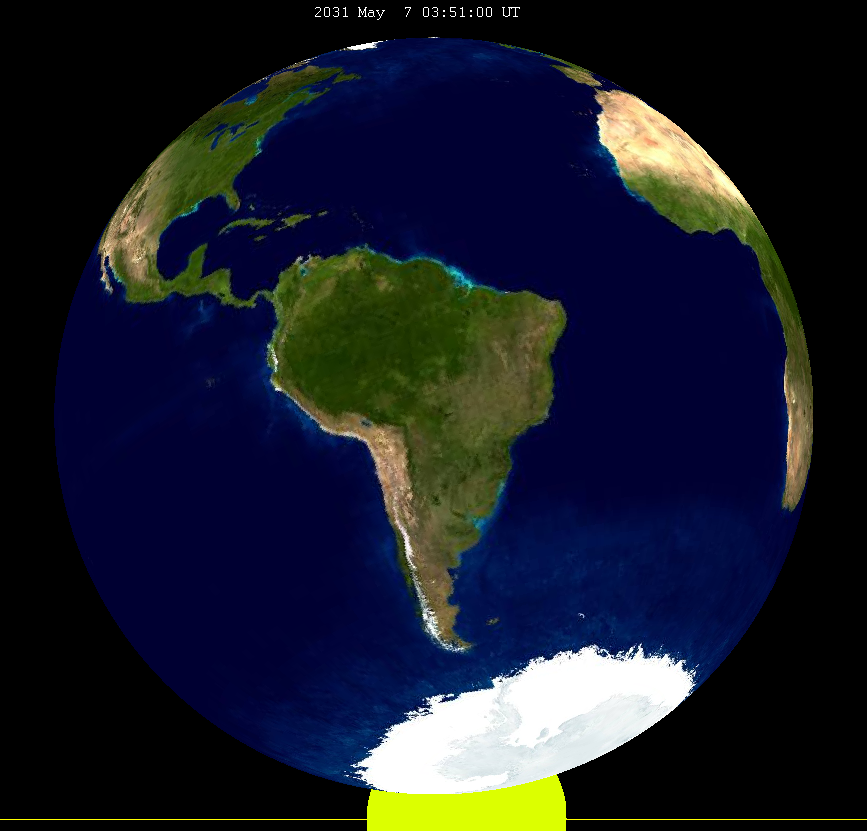
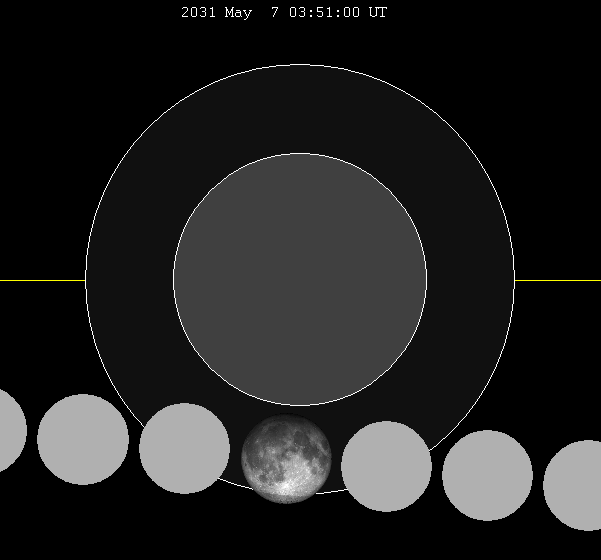

== Eclipse details ==
Shown below is a table displaying details about this particular solar eclipse. It describes various parameters pertaining to this eclipse.

May 7, 2031 Lunar Eclipse Parameters
Parameter	Value
Penumbral Magnitude	0.88267
Umbral Magnitude	−0.08921
Gamma	−1.06949
Sun Right Ascension	02h55m49.7s
Sun Declination	+16°44'40.2"
Sun Semi-Diameter	15'51.2"
Sun Equatorial Horizontal Parallax	08.7"
Moon Right Ascension	14h54m58.0s
Moon Declination	-17°47'29.4"
Moon Semi-Diameter	16'18.7"
Moon Equatorial Horizontal Parallax	0°59'52.0"
ΔT	74.5 s

== Eclipse season ==
This eclipse is part of an eclipse season, a period, roughly every six months, when eclipses occur. Only two (or occasionally three) eclipse seasons occur each year, and each season lasts about 35 days and repeats just short of six months (173 days) later; thus two full eclipse seasons always occur each year. Either two or three eclipses happen each eclipse season. In the sequence below, each eclipse is separated by a fortnight. The first and last eclipse in this sequence is separated by one synodic month.

Eclipse season of May–June 2031
May 7 Ascending node (full moon)	May 21 Descending node (new moon)	June 5 Ascending node (full moon)
Penumbral lunar eclipse Lunar Saros 112	Annular solar eclipse Solar Saros 138	Penumbral lunar eclipse Lunar Saros 150

== Related eclipses ==
=== Eclipses in 2031 ===
- A penumbral lunar eclipse on May 7.
- An annular solar eclipse on May 21.
- A penumbral lunar eclipse on June 5.
- A penumbral lunar eclipse on October 30.
- A hybrid solar eclipse on November 14.

=== Metonic ===
- Preceded by: Lunar eclipse of July 18, 2027
- Followed by: Lunar eclipse of February 22, 2035

=== Tzolkinex ===
- Preceded by: Lunar eclipse of March 25, 2024
- Followed by: Lunar eclipse of June 17, 2038

=== Half-Saros ===
- Preceded by: Solar eclipse of April 30, 2022
- Followed by: Solar eclipse of May 11, 2040

=== Tritos ===
- Preceded by: Lunar eclipse of June 5, 2020
- Followed by: Lunar eclipse of April 5, 2042

=== Lunar Saros 112 ===
- Preceded by: Lunar eclipse of April 25, 2013
- Followed by: Lunar eclipse of May 17, 2049

=== Inex ===
- Preceded by: Lunar eclipse of May 26, 2002
- Followed by: Lunar eclipse of April 15, 2060

=== Triad ===
- Preceded by: Lunar eclipse of July 6, 1944
- Followed by: Lunar eclipse of March 7, 2118

=== Lunar eclipses of 2031–2034 ===
This eclipse is a member of a semester series. An eclipse in a semester series of lunar eclipses repeats approximately every 177 days and 4 hours (a semester) at alternating nodes of the Moon's orbit.

The penumbral lunar eclipse on June 5, 2031 occurs in the previous lunar year eclipse set.

Lunar eclipse series sets from 2031 to 2034
Ascending node				Descending node			
Saros	Date Viewing	Type Chart	Gamma	Saros	Date Viewing	Type Chart	Gamma
112	2031 May 07	Penumbral	−1.0694	117	2031 Oct 30	Penumbral	1.1774
122	2032 Apr 25	Total	−0.3558	127	2032 Oct 18	Total	0.4169
132	2033 Apr 14	Total	0.3954	137	2033 Oct 08	Total	−0.2889
142	2034 Apr 03	Penumbral	1.1144	147	2034 Sep 28	Partial	−1.0110

=== Saros 112 ===
This eclipse is a part of Saros series 112, repeating every 18 years, 11 days, and containing 72 events. The series started with a penumbral lunar eclipse on May 20, 859 AD. It contains partial eclipses from August 3, 985 AD through March 8, 1346; total eclipses from March 18, 1364 through August 27, 1616; and a second set of partial eclipses from September 7, 1634 through April 25, 2013. The series ends at member 72 as a penumbral eclipse on July 12, 2139.

The longest duration of totality was produced by member 36 at 99 minutes, 51 seconds on June 2, 1490. All eclipses in this series occur at the Moon’s ascending node of orbit.

Greatest	First			
The greatest eclipse of the series occurred on 1490 Jun 02, lasting 99 minutes, 51 seconds.	Penumbral	Partial	Total	Central
The greatest eclipse of the series occurred on 1490 Jun 02, lasting 99 minutes, 51 seconds.	859 May 20	985 Aug 03	1364 Mar 18	1436 Apr 30
The greatest eclipse of the series occurred on 1490 Jun 02, lasting 99 minutes, 51 seconds.	Last			
The greatest eclipse of the series occurred on 1490 Jun 02, lasting 99 minutes, 51 seconds.	Central	Total	Partial	Penumbral
The greatest eclipse of the series occurred on 1490 Jun 02, lasting 99 minutes, 51 seconds.	1562 Jul 16	1616 Aug 27	2013 Apr 25	2139 Jul 12

Eclipses are tabulated in three columns; every third eclipse in the same column is one exeligmos apart, so they all cast shadows over approximately the same parts of the Earth.

Series members 54–72 occur between 1801 and 2139:
54	55	56
1814 Dec 26	1833 Jan 06	1851 Jan 17
57	58	59
1869 Jan 28	1887 Feb 08	1905 Feb 19
60	61	62
1923 Mar 03	1941 Mar 13	1959 Mar 24
63	64	65
1977 Apr 04	1995 Apr 15	2013 Apr 25
66	67	68
2031 May 07	2049 May 17	2067 May 28
69	70	71
2085 Jun 08	2103 Jun 20	2121 Jun 30
72
2139 Jul 12

=== Metonic series ===
The Metonic cycle repeats nearly exactly every 19 years and represents a Saros cycle plus one lunar year. Because it occurs on the same calendar date, the Earth's shadow will in nearly the same location relative to the background stars.

This series has 9 events centered on May 6th and October 30th: (saros number)

Ascending node	Descending node
1. 2031 May 07.160 - penumbral (112); 2. 2050 May 06.937 - total (122); 3. 2069 May 06.380 - total (132); 4. 2088 May 05.677 - partial (142); 5. 2107 May 07.186 - penumbral (152)	1. 2031 Oct 30.323 - penumbral (117); 2. 2050 Oct 30.139 - total (127); 3. 2069 Oct 30.148 - total (137); 4. 2088 Oct 30.125 - partial (147)

=== Tritos series ===
This eclipse is a part of a tritos cycle, repeating at alternating nodes every 135 synodic months (≈ 3986.63 days, or 11 years minus 1 month). Their appearance and longitude are irregular due to a lack of synchronization with the anomalistic month (period of perigee), but groupings of 3 tritos cycles (≈ 33 years minus 3 months) come close (≈ 434.044 anomalistic months), so eclipses are similar in these groupings.

Series members between 1922 and 2200
1922 Mar 13 (Saros 102)	1933 Feb 10 (Saros 103)			
		1998 Aug 08 (Saros 109)	2009 Jul 07 (Saros 110)	2020 Jun 05 (Saros 111)
2031 May 07 (Saros 112)	2042 Apr 05 (Saros 113)	2053 Mar 04 (Saros 114)	2064 Feb 02 (Saros 115)	2075 Jan 02 (Saros 116)
2085 Dec 01 (Saros 117)	2096 Oct 31 (Saros 118)	2107 Oct 02 (Saros 119)	2118 Aug 31 (Saros 120)	2129 Jul 31 (Saros 121)
2140 Jun 30 (Saros 122)	2151 May 30 (Saros 123)	2162 Apr 29 (Saros 124)	2173 Mar 29 (Saros 125)	2184 Feb 26 (Saros 126)
2195 Jan 26 (Saros 127)

=== Inex series ===
This eclipse is a part of the long period inex cycle, repeating at alternating nodes, every 358 synodic months (≈ 10,571.95 days, or 29 years minus 20 days). Their appearance and longitude are irregular due to a lack of synchronization with the anomalistic month (period of perigee). However, groupings of 3 inex cycles (≈ 87 years minus 2 months) comes close (≈ 1,151.02 anomalistic months), so eclipses are similar in these groupings.

Series members between 1801 and 2200
1828 Sep 23 (Saros 105)	1857 Sep 04 (Saros 106)	1886 Aug 14 (Saros 107)
1915 Jul 26 (Saros 108)	1944 Jul 06 (Saros 109)	1973 Jun 15 (Saros 110)
2002 May 26 (Saros 111)	2031 May 07 (Saros 112)	2060 Apr 15 (Saros 113)
2089 Mar 26 (Saros 114)	2118 Mar 07 (Saros 115)	2147 Feb 15 (Saros 116)
2176 Jan 26 (Saros 117)

=== Half-Saros cycle ===
A lunar eclipse will be preceded and followed by solar eclipses by 9 years and 5.5 days (a half saros). This lunar eclipse is related to two partial solar eclipses of Solar Saros 119.

April 30, 2022	May 11, 2040

== See also ==
- List of lunar eclipses and List of 21st-century lunar eclipses
