= May 1984 lunar eclipse =

Penumbral lunar eclipse May 15, 1984

- Penumbral eclipse
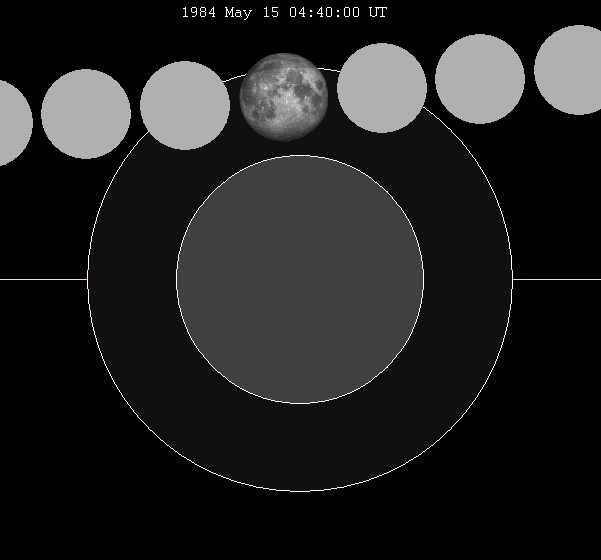
- The Moon's hourly motion shown right to left
- Date: May 15, 1984
- Gamma: 1.1131
- Magnitude: −0.1759
- Saros cycle: 111 (65 of 71)
- Penumbral: 232 minutes, 31 seconds
Contacts (UTC)
- P1: 2:43:49
- Greatest: 4:40:09
- P4: 6:36:20

A penumbral lunar eclipse occurred at the Moon’s descending node of orbit on Tuesday, May 15, 1984, with an umbral magnitude of −0.1759. A lunar eclipse occurs when the Moon moves into the Earth's shadow, causing the Moon to be darkened. A penumbral lunar eclipse occurs when part or all of the Moon's near side passes into the Earth's penumbra. Unlike a solar eclipse, which can only be viewed from a relatively small area of the world, a lunar eclipse may be viewed from anywhere on the night side of Earth. Occurring about 3 days after perigee (on May 12, 1984, at 4:05 UTC), the Moon's apparent diameter was larger.

== Visibility ==
The eclipse was completely visible over much of North America, South America, and Antarctica, seen rising over northwestern North America and the central Pacific Ocean and setting over Africa and much of Europe.

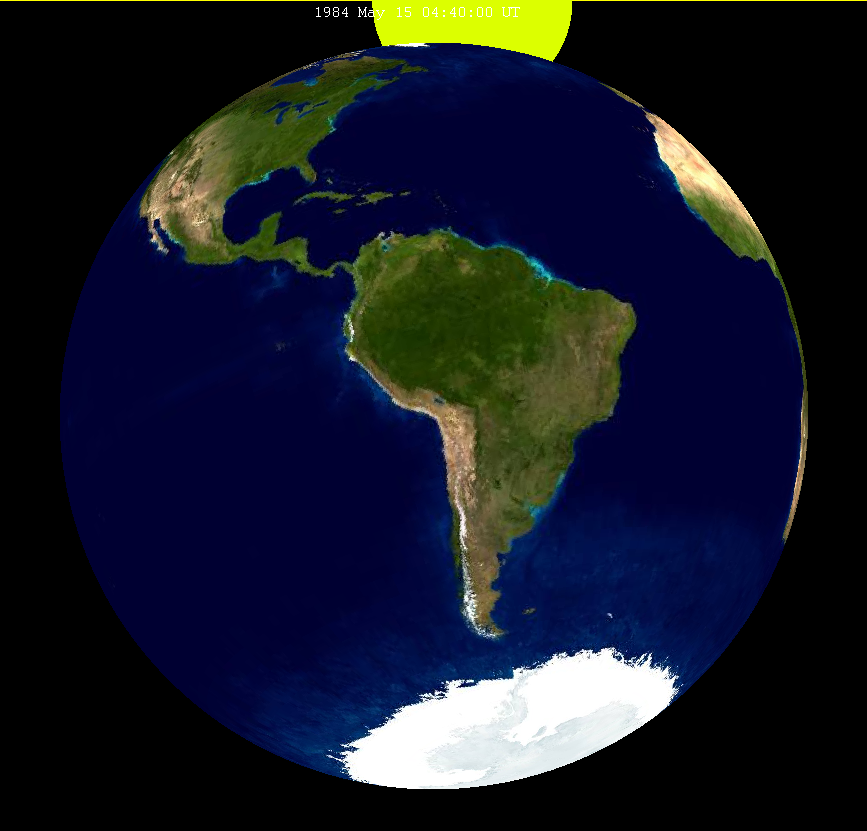
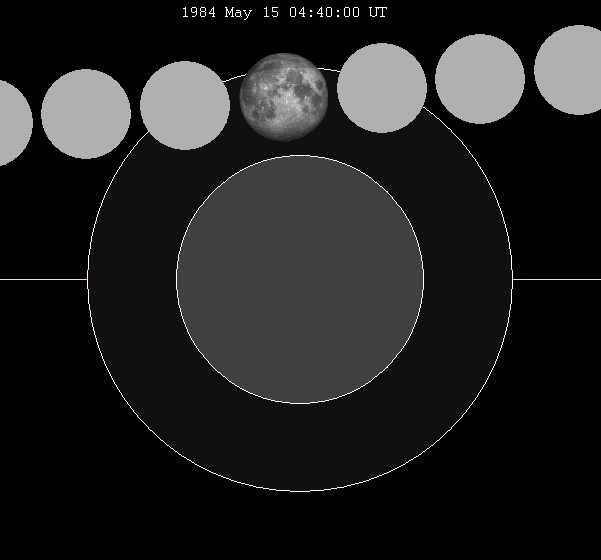

== Eclipse details ==
Shown below is a table displaying details about this particular lunar eclipse. It describes various parameters pertaining to this eclipse.

May 15, 1984 Lunar Eclipse Parameters
| Parameter | Value |
|---|---|
| Penumbral Magnitude | 0.80710 |
| Umbral Magnitude | −0.17593 |
| Gamma | 1.11308 |
| Sun Right Ascension | 03h28m40.8s |
| Sun Declination | +18°54'19.8" |
| Sun Semi-Diameter | 15'49.2" |
| Sun Equatorial Horizontal Parallax | 08.7" |
| Moon Right Ascension | 15h30m13.7s |
| Moon Declination | -17°52'23.9" |
| Moon Semi-Diameter | 16'05.6" |
| Moon Equatorial Horizontal Parallax | 0°59'03.7" |
| ΔT | 54.0 s |

== Eclipse season ==
This eclipse is part of an eclipse season, a period, roughly every six months, when eclipses occur. Only two (or occasionally three) eclipse seasons occur each year, and each season lasts about 35 days and repeats just short of six months (173 days) later; thus two full eclipse seasons always occur each year. Either two or three eclipses happen each eclipse season. In the sequence below, each eclipse is separated by a fortnight. The first and last eclipse in this sequence is separated by one synodic month.

Eclipse season of May–June 1984
| May 15 Descending node (full moon) | May 30 Ascending node (new moon) | June 13 Descending node (full moon) |
|---|---|---|
| Penumbral lunar eclipse Lunar Saros 111 | Annular solar eclipse Solar Saros 137 | Penumbral lunar eclipse Lunar Saros 149 |

== Related eclipses ==
=== Eclipses in 1984 ===
- A penumbral lunar eclipse on May 15.
- An annular solar eclipse on May 30.
- A penumbral lunar eclipse on June 13.
- A penumbral lunar eclipse on November 8.
- A total solar eclipse on November 22.

=== Metonic ===
- Preceded by: Lunar eclipse of July 27, 1980
- Followed by: Lunar eclipse of March 3, 1988

=== Tzolkinex ===
- Preceded by: Lunar eclipse of April 4, 1977
- Followed by: Lunar eclipse of June 27, 1991

=== Half-Saros ===
- Preceded by: Solar eclipse of May 11, 1975
- Followed by: Solar eclipse of May 21, 1993

=== Tritos ===
- Preceded by: Lunar eclipse of June 15, 1973
- Followed by: Lunar eclipse of April 15, 1995

=== Lunar Saros 111 ===
- Preceded by: Lunar eclipse of May 4, 1966
- Followed by: Lunar eclipse of May 26, 2002

=== Inex ===
- Preceded by: Lunar eclipse of June 5, 1955
- Followed by: Lunar eclipse of April 25, 2013

=== Triad ===
- Preceded by: Lunar eclipse of July 14, 1897
- Followed by: Lunar eclipse of March 16, 2071

=== Lunar eclipses of 1984–1987 ===
This eclipse is a member of a semester series. An eclipse in a semester series of lunar eclipses repeats approximately every 177 days and 4 hours (a semester) at alternating nodes of the Moon's orbit.

The penumbral lunar eclipse on June 13, 1984 occurs in the previous lunar year eclipse set.

Lunar eclipse series sets from 1984 to 1987
| Descending node | | | | Ascending node | | | |
| Saros | Date Viewing | Type Chart | Gamma | Saros | Date Viewing | Type Chart | Gamma |
| 111 | 1984 May 15 | Penumbral | 1.1131 | 116 | 1984 Nov 08 | Penumbral | −1.0900 |
| 121 | 1985 May 04 | Total | 0.3520 | 126 | 1985 Oct 28 | Total | −0.4022 |
| 131 | 1986 Apr 24 | Total | −0.3683 | 136 | 1986 Oct 17 | Total | 0.3189 |
| 141 | 1987 Apr 14 | Penumbral | −1.1364 | 146 | 1987 Oct 07 | Penumbral | 1.0189 |

=== Metonic series ===
The Metonic cycle repeats nearly exactly every 19 years and represents a Saros cycle plus one lunar year. Because it occurs on the same calendar date, the Earth's shadow will be in nearly the same location relative to the background stars.

| 1. 1984 May 15.19 - penumbral (111); 2. 2003 May 16.15 - total (121); 3. 2022 May 16.17 - total (131); 4. 2041 May 16.03 - penumbral (141) | 1. 1984 Nov 08.75 - penumbral (116); 2. 2003 Nov 09.05 - total (126); 3. 2022 Nov 08.46 - total (136); 4. 2041 Nov 08.19 - partial (146); 5. 2060 Nov 08.17 - penumbral (156) |

=== Saros 111 ===
This eclipse is a part of Saros series 111, repeating every 18 years, 11 days, and containing 71 events. The series started with a penumbral lunar eclipse on June 10, 830 AD. It contains partial eclipses from September 14, 992 AD through April 8, 1335; total eclipses from April 19, 1353 through August 4, 1533; and a second set of partial eclipses from August 16, 1551 through April 23, 1948. The series ends at member 71 as a penumbral eclipse on July 19, 2092.

The longest duration of totality was produced by member 35 at 106 minutes, 14 seconds on June 12, 1443. All eclipses in this series occur at the Moon’s descending node of orbit.

| Greatest | First | | | |
|---|---|---|---|---|
| The greatest eclipse of the series occurred on 1443 Jun 12, lasting 106 minutes, 14 seconds. | Penumbral | Partial | Total | Central |
| The greatest eclipse of the series occurred on 1443 Jun 12, lasting 106 minutes, 14 seconds. | 830 Jun 10 | 992 Sep 14 | 1353 Apr 19 | 1389 May 10 |
| The greatest eclipse of the series occurred on 1443 Jun 12, lasting 106 minutes, 14 seconds. | Last | | | |
| The greatest eclipse of the series occurred on 1443 Jun 12, lasting 106 minutes, 14 seconds. | Central | Total | Partial | Penumbral |
| The greatest eclipse of the series occurred on 1443 Jun 12, lasting 106 minutes, 14 seconds. | 1497 Jul 14 | 1533 Aug 04 | 1948 Apr 23 | 2092 Jul 19 |

Eclipses are tabulated in three columns; every third eclipse in the same column is one exeligmos apart, so they all cast shadows over approximately the same parts of the Earth.

Series members 55–71 occur between 1801 and 2092:
| 55 | 56 | 57 |
|---|---|---|
| 1804 Jan 26 | 1822 Feb 06 | 1840 Feb 17 |
| 58 | 59 | 60 |
| 1858 Feb 27 | 1876 Mar 10 | 1894 Mar 21 |
| 61 | 62 | 63 |
| 1912 Apr 01 | 1930 Apr 13 | 1948 Apr 23 |
| 64 | 65 | 66 |
| 1966 May 04 | 1984 May 15 | 2002 May 26 |
| 67 | 68 | 69 |
| 2020 Jun 05 | 2038 Jun 17 | 2056 Jun 27 |
| 70 | 71 | |
| 2074 Jul 08 | 2092 Jul 19 | |

=== Tritos series ===
This eclipse is a part of a tritos cycle, repeating at alternating nodes every 135 synodic months (≈ 3986.63 days, or 11 years minus 1 month). Their appearance and longitude are irregular due to a lack of synchronization with the anomalistic month (period of perigee), but groupings of 3 tritos cycles (≈ 33 years minus 3 months) come close (≈ 434.044 anomalistic months), so eclipses are similar in these groupings.

Series members between 1886 and 2200
| 1886 Feb 18 (Saros 102) | 1897 Jan 18 (Saros 103) | | | |
| | 1951 Aug 17 (Saros 108) | 1962 Jul 17 (Saros 109) | 1973 Jun 15 (Saros 110) | 1984 May 15 (Saros 111) |
| 1995 Apr 15 (Saros 112) | 2006 Mar 14 (Saros 113) | 2017 Feb 11 (Saros 114) | 2028 Jan 12 (Saros 115) | 2038 Dec 11 (Saros 116) |
| 2049 Nov 09 (Saros 117) | 2060 Oct 09 (Saros 118) | 2071 Sep 09 (Saros 119) | 2082 Aug 08 (Saros 120) | 2093 Jul 08 (Saros 121) |
| 2104 Jun 08 (Saros 122) | 2115 May 08 (Saros 123) | 2126 Apr 07 (Saros 124) | 2137 Mar 07 (Saros 125) | 2148 Feb 04 (Saros 126) |
| 2159 Jan 04 (Saros 127) | 2169 Dec 04 (Saros 128) | 2180 Nov 02 (Saros 129) | 2191 Oct 02 (Saros 130) | |

=== Inex series ===
This eclipse is a part of the long period inex cycle, repeating at alternating nodes, every 358 synodic months (≈ 10,571.95 days, or 29 years minus 20 days). Their appearance and longitude are irregular due to a lack of synchronization with the anomalistic month (period of perigee). However, groupings of 3 inex cycles (≈ 87 years minus 2 months) comes close (≈ 1,151.02 anomalistic months), so eclipses are similar in these groupings.

Series members between 1801 and 2200
| 1810 Sep 13 (Saros 105) | 1839 Aug 24 (Saros 106) | 1868 Aug 03 (Saros 107) |
| 1897 Jul 14 (Saros 108) | 1926 Jun 25 (Saros 109) | 1955 Jun 05 (Saros 110) |
| 1984 May 15 (Saros 111) | 2013 Apr 25 (Saros 112) | 2042 Apr 05 (Saros 113) |
| 2071 Mar 16 (Saros 114) | 2100 Feb 24 (Saros 115) | 2129 Feb 04 (Saros 116) |
| 2158 Jan 14 (Saros 117) | 2186 Dec 26 (Saros 118) | |

=== Half-Saros cycle ===
A lunar eclipse will be preceded and followed by solar eclipses by 9 years and 5.5 days (a half saros). This lunar eclipse is related to two partial solar eclipses of Solar Saros 118.

| May 11, 1975 | May 21, 1993 |

== See also ==
- List of lunar eclipses
- List of 20th-century lunar eclipses
