= June 2020 lunar eclipse =

Penumbral lunar eclipse of 5 June 2020

- Penumbral eclipse
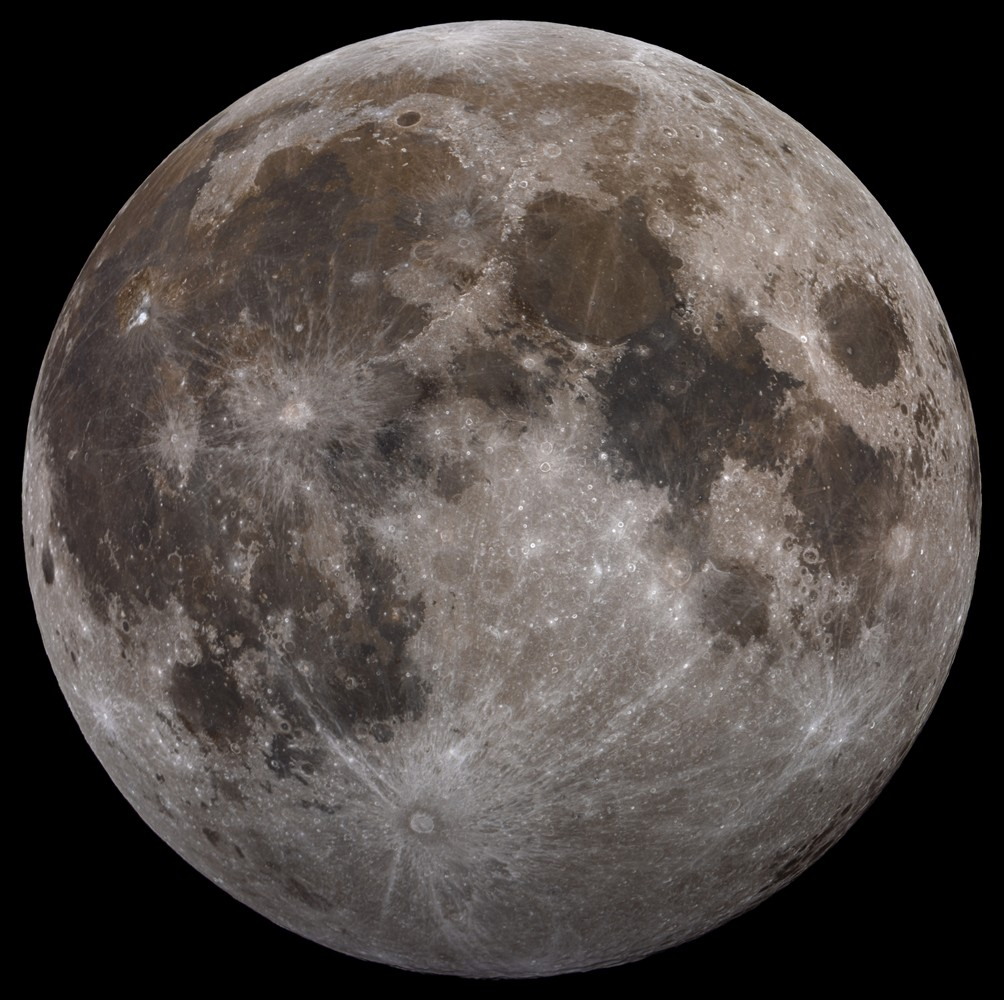
- Penumbral eclipse as viewed from Johannesburg, South Africa, 19:18 UTC
- Date: June 5, 2020
- Gamma: 1.2406
- Magnitude: −0.4036
- Saros cycle: 111 (67 of 71)
- Penumbral: 198 minutes, 13 seconds
Contacts (UTC)
- P1: 17:45:50
- Greatest: 19:25:02
- P4: 21:04:03

A penumbral lunar eclipse occurred at the Moon's descending node of orbit on Friday, June 5, 2020, with an umbral magnitude of −0.4036. A lunar eclipse occurs when the Moon moves into the Earth's shadow, causing the Moon to be darkened. A penumbral lunar eclipse occurs when part or all of the Moon's near side passes into the Earth's penumbra. Unlike a solar eclipse, which can only be viewed from a relatively small area of the world, a lunar eclipse may be viewed from anywhere on the night side of Earth. Occurring about 2.8 days after perigee (on June 2, 2020, at 23:40 UTC), the Moon's apparent diameter was larger.

This eclipse was the second of four penumbral lunar eclipses in 2020, with the others occurring on January 10, July 5, and November 30.

The eclipse coincided with June's full moon, popularly known in North America as the "Strawberry Moon," a name tied to the wild strawberries that ripen in the early weeks of summer in the Northern Hemisphere. At maximum, roughly 57 percent of the Moon's disc had entered the penumbra.

The eclipse was not visible from most of North or South America, since it occurred while the Moon was below the horizon there; the Rome-based Virtual Telescope Project streamed a live online broadcast of the eclipse for viewers unable to see it in person from their own location.

== Visibility ==
The eclipse was completely visible over east Africa, eastern Europe, Asia, and Australia, seen rising over west Africa, Europe, and eastern South America and setting over northeast Asia and the western Pacific Ocean.

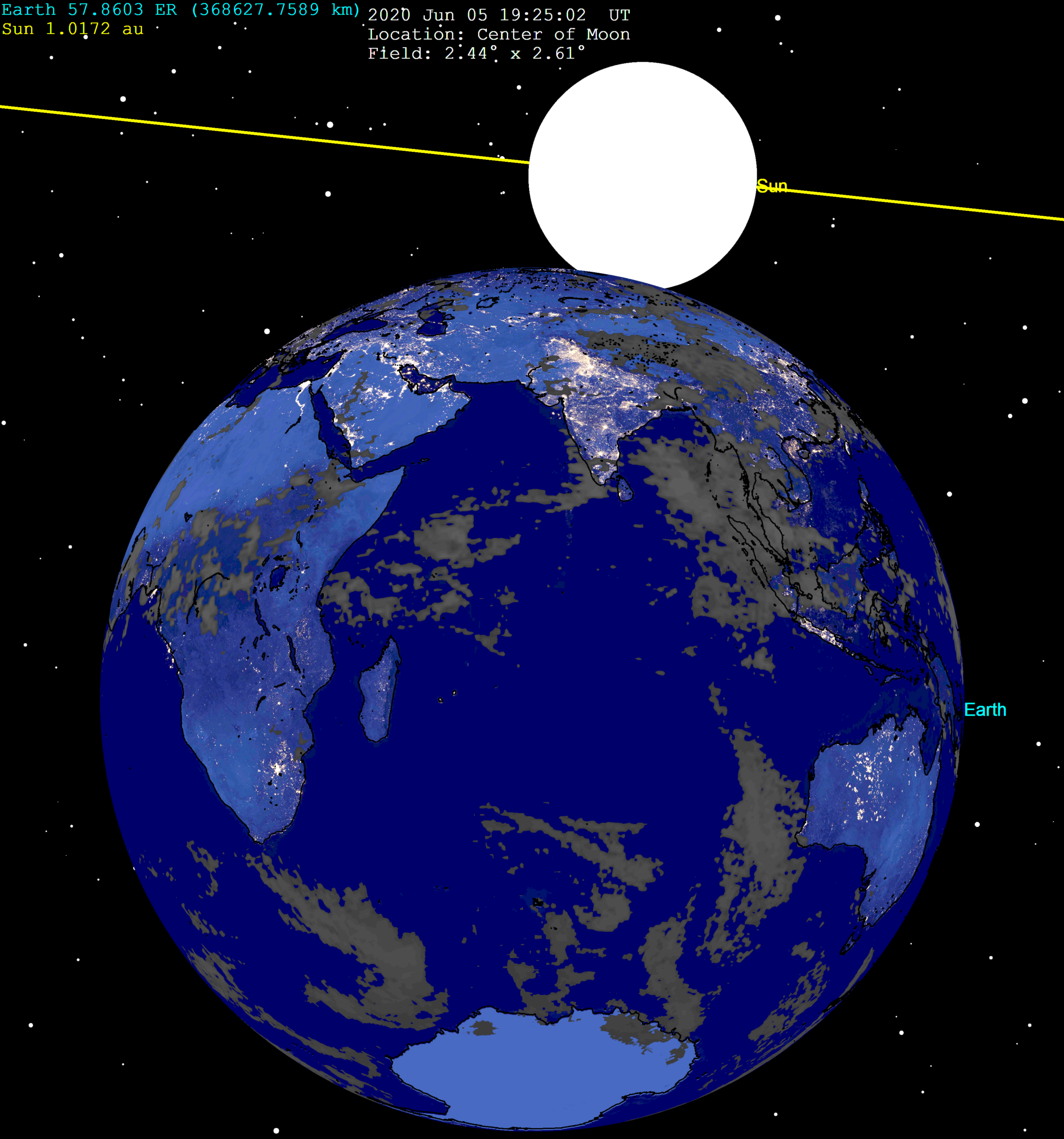
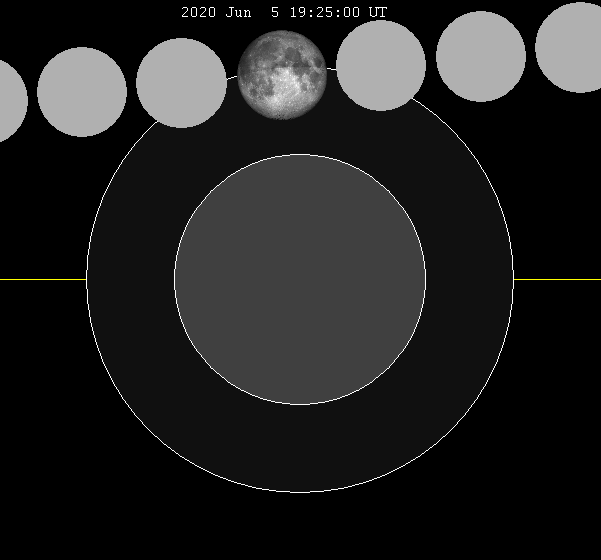
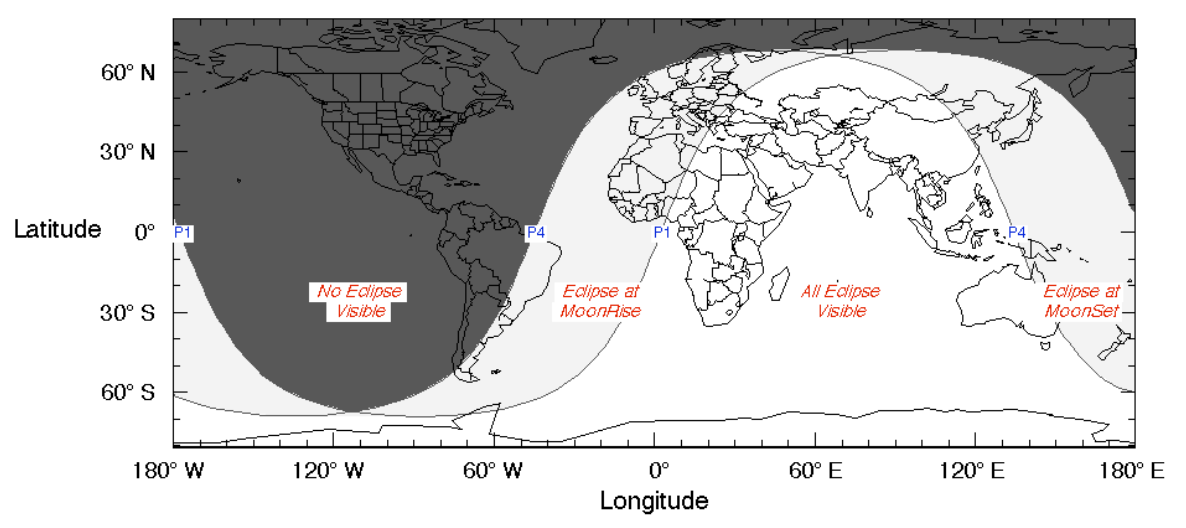
Visibility map

== Gallery ==
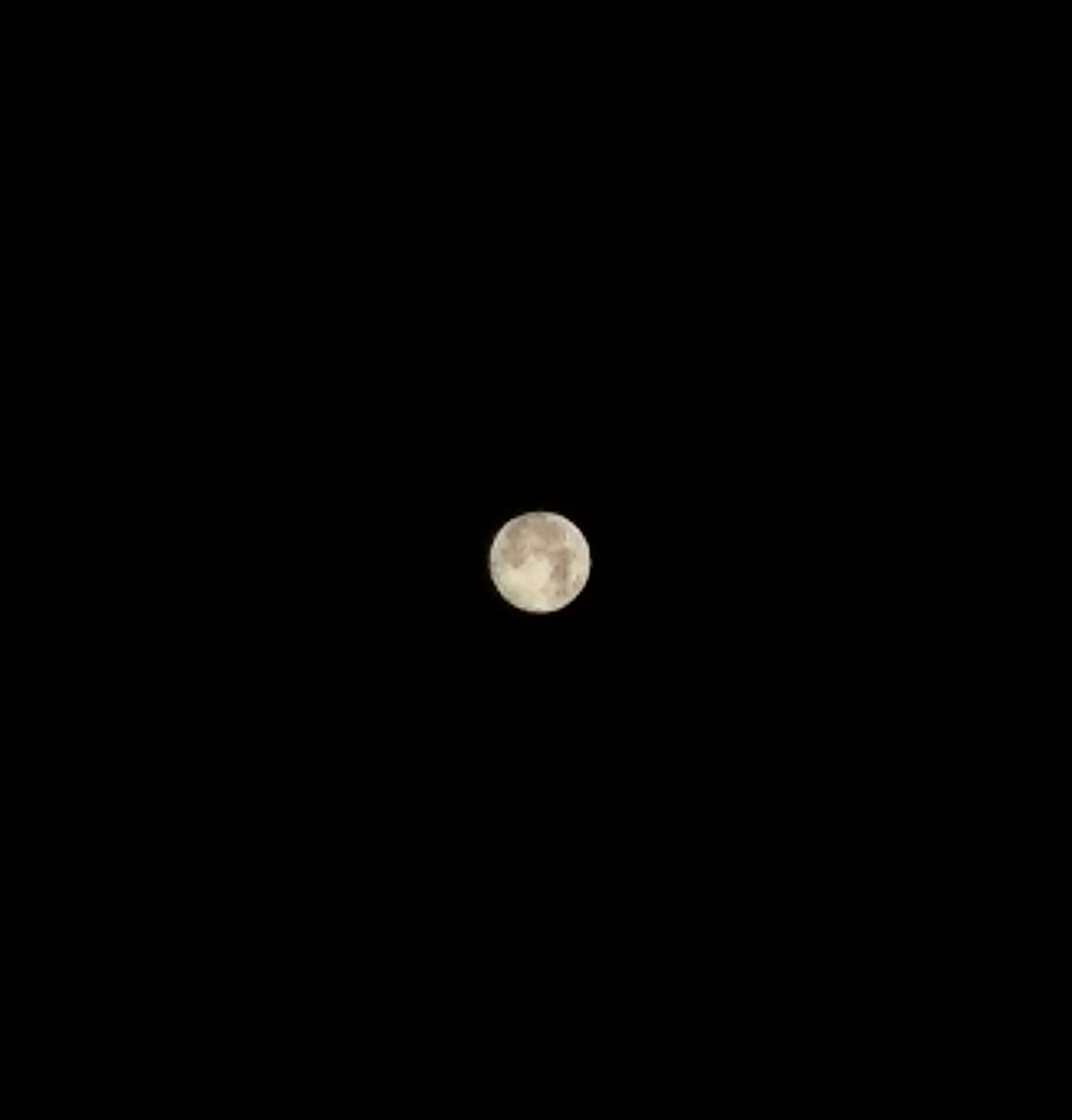
San Jose del Monte, Philippines, 18:51 UTC

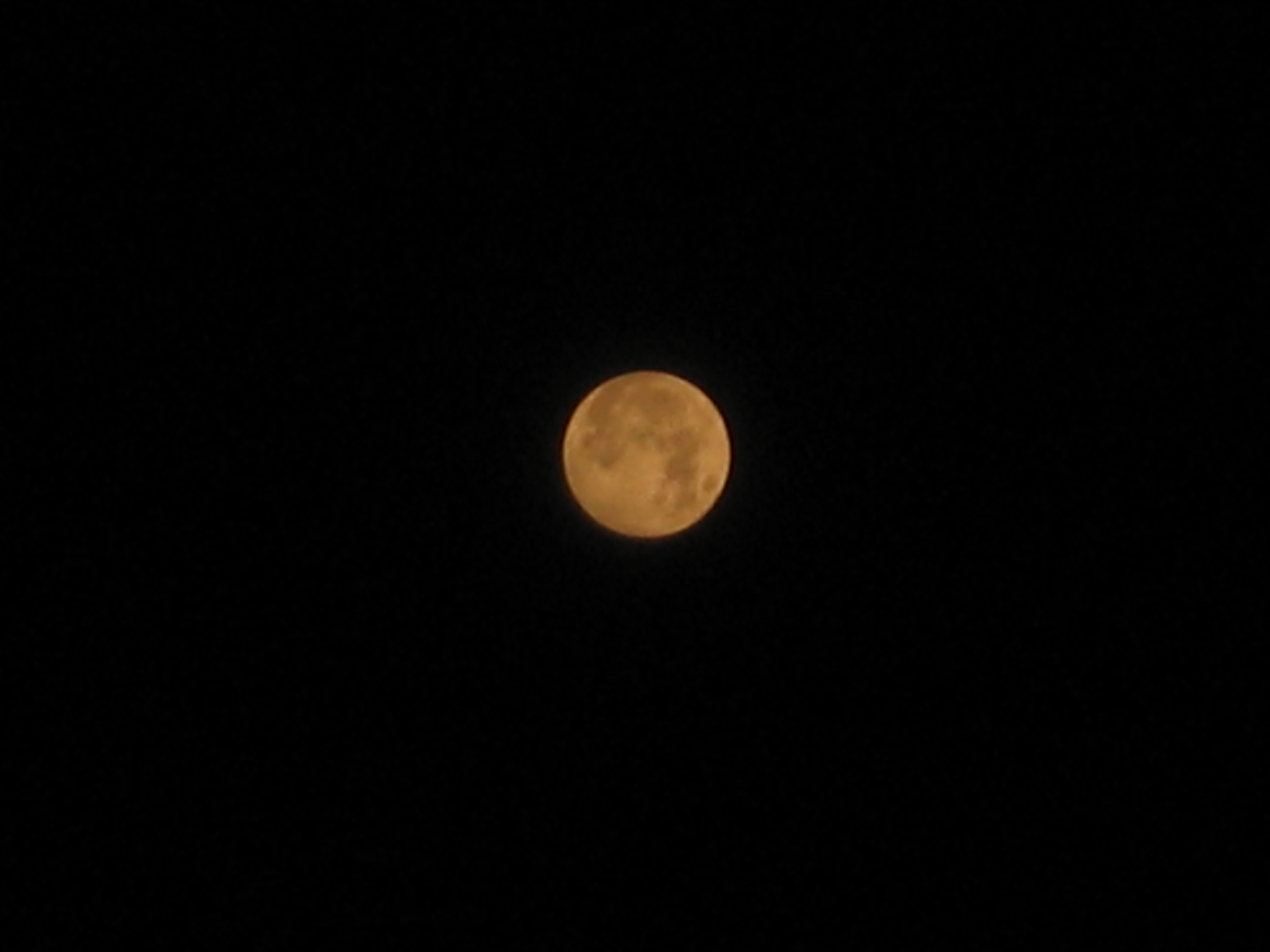
Hefei, China, 19:25 UTC

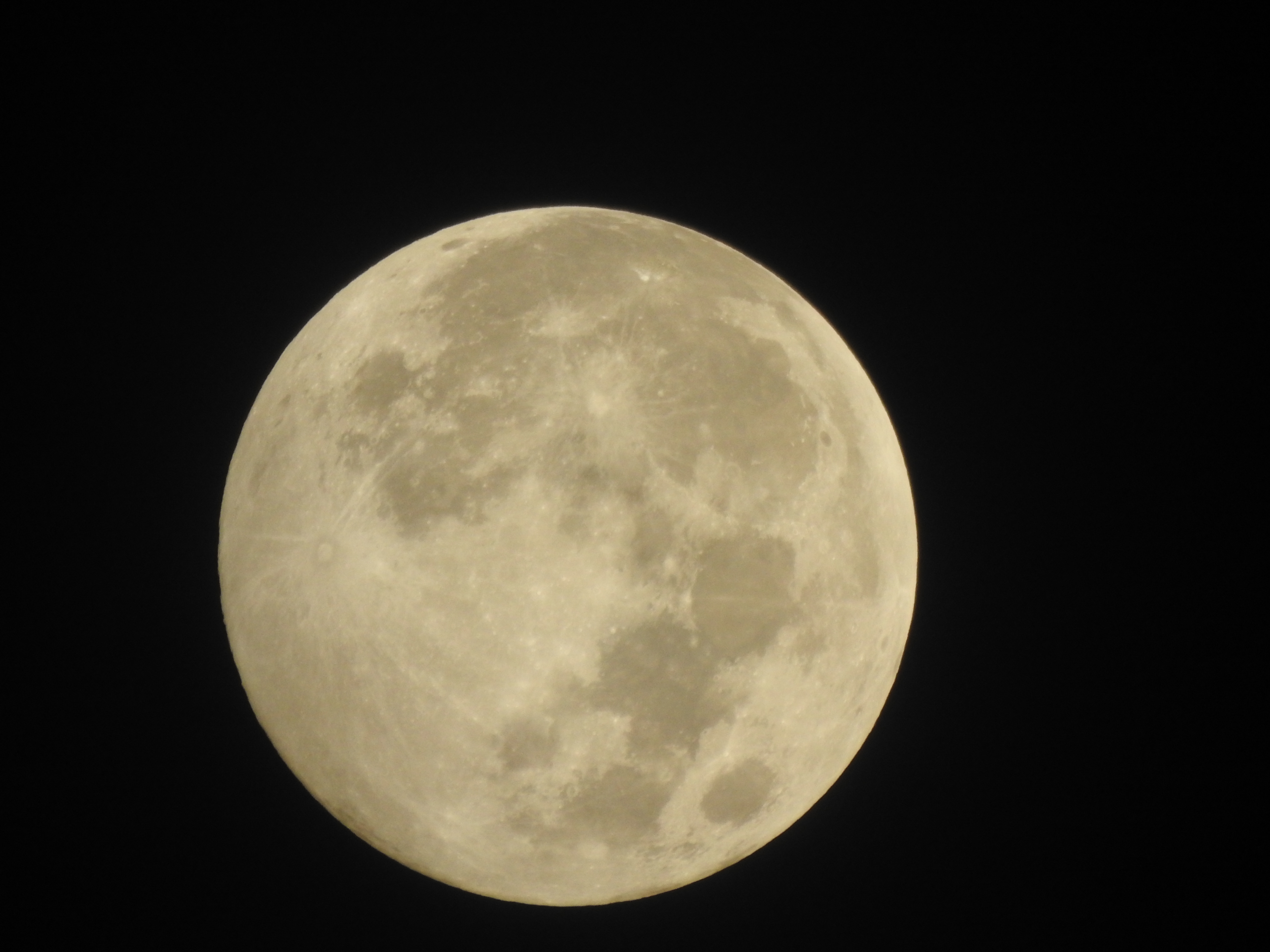
Surabaya, Indonesia, 19:25 UTC

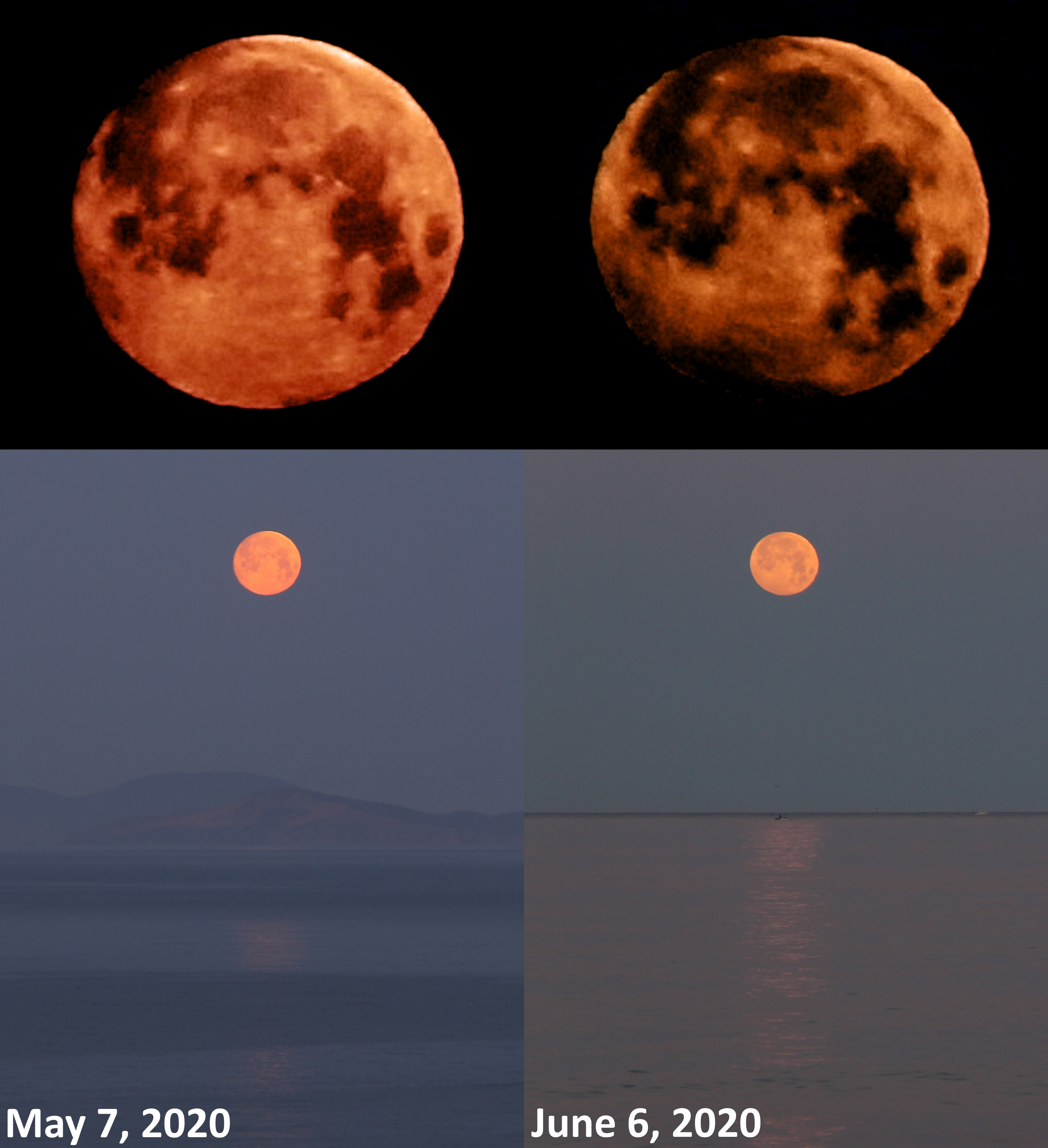
Nakhodka, Russia, 19:26 UTC

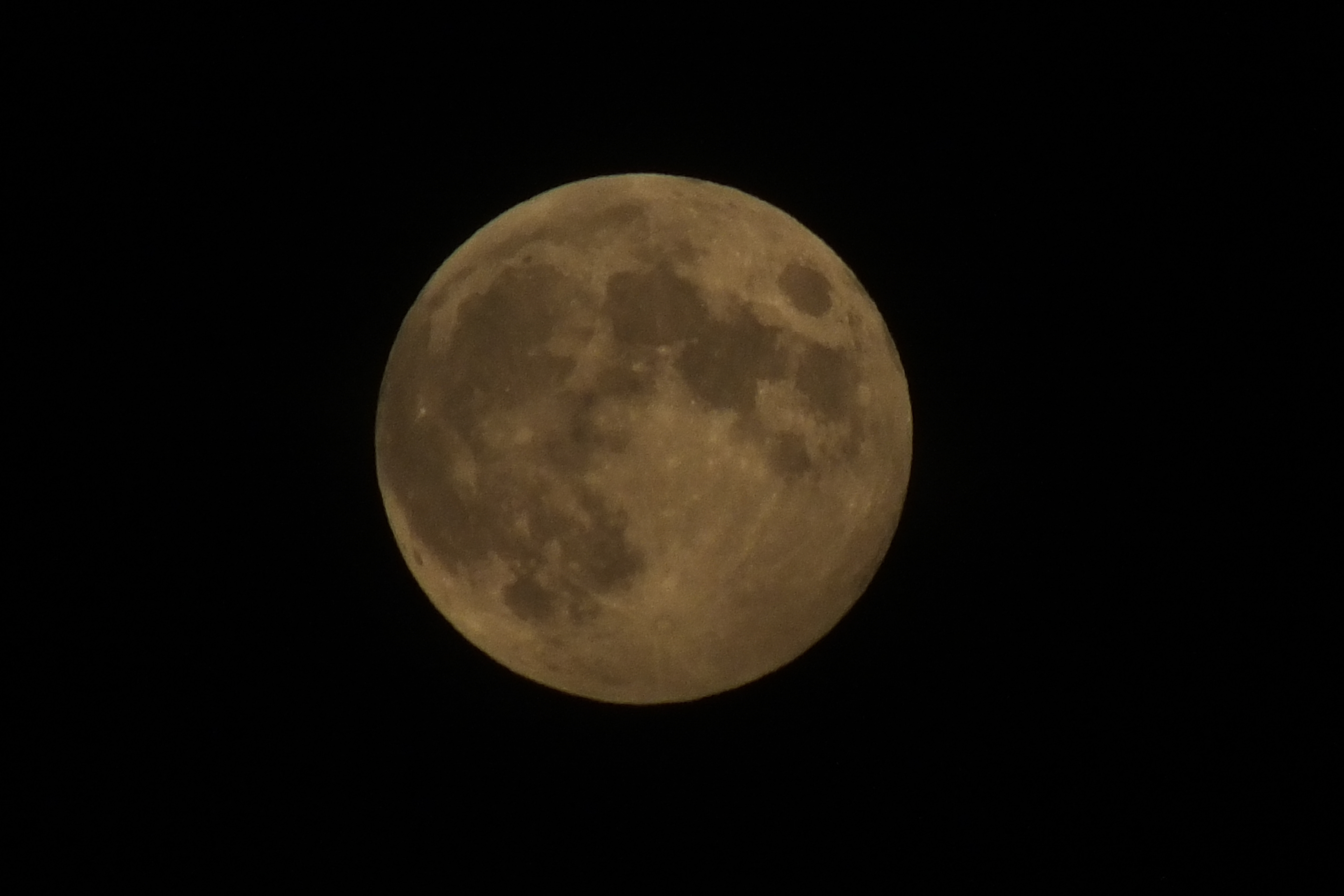
Moscow, Russia, 19:33 UTC

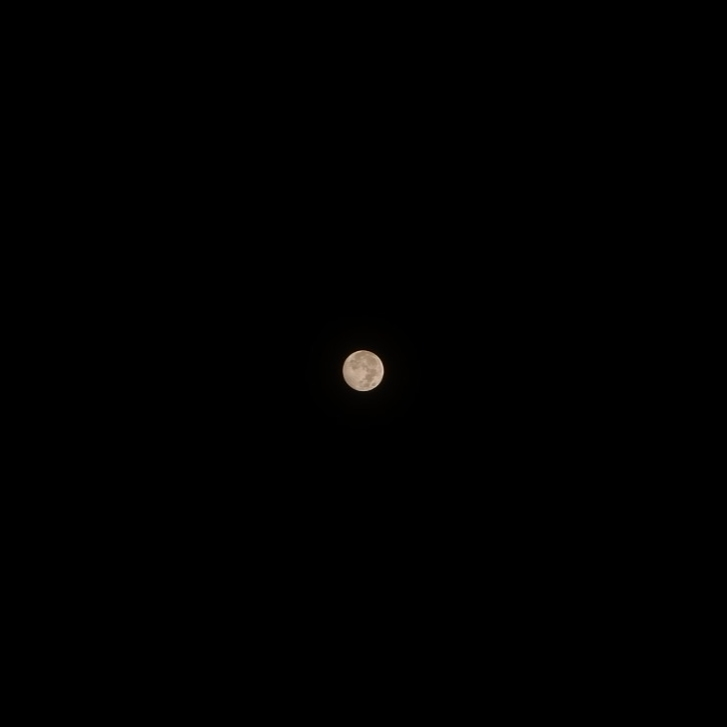
Cepu, Indonesia, 19:39 UTC

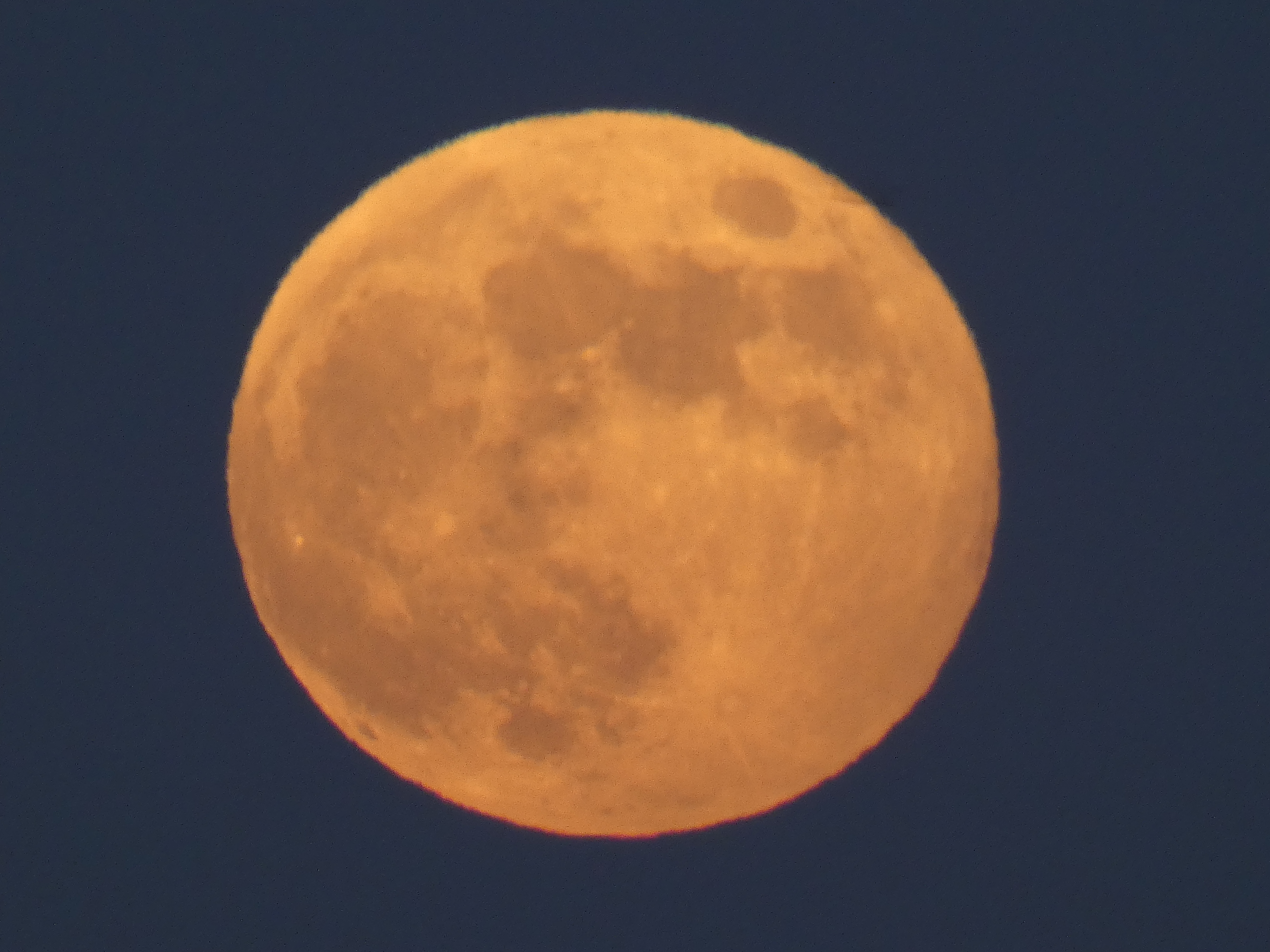
Logroño, Spain, 19:56 UTC

== Eclipse details ==
Shown below is a table displaying details about this particular solar eclipse. It describes various parameters pertaining to this eclipse.

June 5, 2020 Lunar Eclipse Parameters
Parameter	Value
Penumbral Magnitude	0.56993
Umbral Magnitude	−0.40361
Gamma	1.24063
Sun Right Ascension	04h57m21.6s
Sun Declination	+22°39'21.3"
Sun Semi-Diameter	15'45.7"
Sun Equatorial Horizontal Parallax	08.7"
Moon Right Ascension	16h58m25.6s
Moon Declination	-21°27'08.8"
Moon Semi-Diameter	16'11.4"
Moon Equatorial Horizontal Parallax	0°59'25.1"
ΔT	69.6 s

== Eclipse season ==
This eclipse is part of an eclipse season, a period, roughly every six months, when eclipses occur. Only two (or occasionally three) eclipse seasons occur each year, and each season lasts about 35 days and repeats just short of six months (173 days) later; thus two full eclipse seasons always occur each year. Either two or three eclipses happen each eclipse season. In the sequence below, each eclipse is separated by a fortnight. The first and last eclipse in this sequence is separated by one synodic month.

Eclipse season of June–July 2020
June 5 Descending node (full moon)	June 21 Ascending node (new moon)	July 5 Descending node (full moon)
Penumbral lunar eclipse Lunar Saros 111	Annular solar eclipse Solar Saros 137	Penumbral lunar eclipse Lunar Saros 149

== Related eclipses ==
=== Eclipses in 2020 ===
- A penumbral lunar eclipse on January 10.
- A penumbral lunar eclipse on June 5.
- An annular solar eclipse on June 21.
- A penumbral lunar eclipse on July 5.
- A penumbral lunar eclipse on November 30.
- A total solar eclipse on December 14.

=== Metonic ===
- Preceded by: Lunar eclipse of August 18, 2016
- Followed by: Lunar eclipse of March 25, 2024

=== Tzolkinex ===
- Preceded by: Lunar eclipse of April 25, 2013
- Followed by: Lunar eclipse of July 18, 2027

=== Half-Saros ===
- Preceded by: Solar eclipse of June 1, 2011
- Followed by: Solar eclipse of June 12, 2029

=== Tritos ===
- Preceded by: Lunar eclipse of July 7, 2009
- Followed by: Lunar eclipse of May 7, 2031

=== Lunar Saros 111 ===
- Preceded by: Lunar eclipse of May 26, 2002
- Followed by: Lunar eclipse of June 17, 2038

=== Inex ===
- Preceded by: Lunar eclipse of June 27, 1991
- Followed by: Lunar eclipse of May 17, 2049

=== Triad ===
- Preceded by: Lunar eclipse of August 5, 1933
- Followed by: Lunar eclipse of April 7, 2107

=== Lunar eclipses of 2020–2023 ===
This eclipse is a member of a semester series. An eclipse in a semester series of lunar eclipses repeats approximately every 177 days and 4 hours (a semester) at alternating nodes of the Moon's orbit.

The penumbral lunar eclipses on January 10, 2020 and July 5, 2020 occur in the previous lunar year eclipse set.

Lunar eclipse series sets from 2020 to 2023
Descending node				Ascending node			
Saros	Date Viewing	Type Chart	Gamma	Saros	Date Viewing	Type Chart	Gamma
111	2020 Jun 05	Penumbral	1.2406	116	2020 Nov 30	Penumbral	−1.1309
121	2021 May 26	Total	0.4774	126	2021 Nov 19	Partial	−0.4553
131	2022 May 16	Total	−0.2532	136	2022 Nov 08	Total	0.2570
141	2023 May 05	Penumbral	−1.0350	146	2023 Oct 28	Partial	0.9472

=== Saros 111 ===
This eclipse is a part of Saros series 111, repeating every 18 years, 11 days, and containing 71 events. The series started with a penumbral lunar eclipse on June 10, 830 AD. It contains partial eclipses from September 14, 992 AD through April 8, 1335; total eclipses from April 19, 1353 through August 4, 1533; and a second set of partial eclipses from August 16, 1551 through April 23, 1948. The series ends at member 71 as a penumbral eclipse on July 19, 2092.

The longest duration of totality was produced by member 35 at 106 minutes, 14 seconds on June 12, 1443. All eclipses in this series occur at the Moon’s descending node of orbit.

Greatest	First			
The greatest eclipse of the series occurred on 1443 Jun 12, lasting 106 minutes, 14 seconds.	Penumbral	Partial	Total	Central
The greatest eclipse of the series occurred on 1443 Jun 12, lasting 106 minutes, 14 seconds.	830 Jun 10	992 Sep 14	1353 Apr 19	1389 May 10
The greatest eclipse of the series occurred on 1443 Jun 12, lasting 106 minutes, 14 seconds.	Last			
The greatest eclipse of the series occurred on 1443 Jun 12, lasting 106 minutes, 14 seconds.	Central	Total	Partial	Penumbral
The greatest eclipse of the series occurred on 1443 Jun 12, lasting 106 minutes, 14 seconds.	1497 Jul 14	1533 Aug 04	1948 Apr 23	2092 Jul 19

Eclipses are tabulated in three columns; every third eclipse in the same column is one exeligmos apart, so they all cast shadows over approximately the same parts of the Earth.

Series members 55–71 occur between 1801 and 2092:
55	56	57
1804 Jan 26	1822 Feb 06	1840 Feb 17
58	59	60
1858 Feb 27	1876 Mar 10	1894 Mar 21
61	62	63
1912 Apr 01	1930 Apr 13	1948 Apr 23
64	65	66
1966 May 04	1984 May 15	2002 May 26
67	68	69
2020 Jun 05	2038 Jun 17	2056 Jun 27
70	71	
2074 Jul 08	2092 Jul 19	

=== Tritos series ===
This eclipse is a part of a tritos cycle, repeating at alternating nodes every 135 synodic months (≈ 3986.63 days, or 11 years minus 1 month). Their appearance and longitude are irregular due to a lack of synchronization with the anomalistic month (period of perigee), but groupings of 3 tritos cycles (≈ 33 years minus 3 months) come close (≈ 434.044 anomalistic months), so eclipses are similar in these groupings.

Series members between 1922 and 2200
1922 Mar 13 (Saros 102)	1933 Feb 10 (Saros 103)			
		1998 Aug 08 (Saros 109)	2009 Jul 07 (Saros 110)	2020 Jun 05 (Saros 111)
2031 May 07 (Saros 112)	2042 Apr 05 (Saros 113)	2053 Mar 04 (Saros 114)	2064 Feb 02 (Saros 115)	2075 Jan 02 (Saros 116)
2085 Dec 01 (Saros 117)	2096 Oct 31 (Saros 118)	2107 Oct 02 (Saros 119)	2118 Aug 31 (Saros 120)	2129 Jul 31 (Saros 121)
2140 Jun 30 (Saros 122)	2151 May 30 (Saros 123)	2162 Apr 29 (Saros 124)	2173 Mar 29 (Saros 125)	2184 Feb 26 (Saros 126)
2195 Jan 26 (Saros 127)

=== Inex series ===
This eclipse is a part of the long period inex cycle, repeating at alternating nodes, every 358 synodic months (≈ 10,571.95 days, or 29 years minus 20 days). Their appearance and longitude are irregular due to a lack of synchronization with the anomalistic month (period of perigee). However, groupings of 3 inex cycles (≈ 87 years minus 2 months) comes close (≈ 1,151.02 anomalistic months), so eclipses are similar in these groupings.

Series members between 1846 and 2200
1846 Oct 04 (Saros 105)	1875 Sep 15 (Saros 106)	
1933 Aug 05 (Saros 108)	1962 Jul 17 (Saros 109)	1991 Jun 27 (Saros 110)
2020 Jun 05 (Saros 111)	2049 May 17 (Saros 112)	2078 Apr 27 (Saros 113)
2107 Apr 07 (Saros 114)	2136 Mar 18 (Saros 115)	2165 Feb 26 (Saros 116)
2194 Feb 05 (Saros 117)

=== Half-Saros cycle ===
A lunar eclipse will be preceded and followed by solar eclipses by 9 years and 5.5 days (a half saros). This lunar eclipse is related to two partial solar eclipses of Solar Saros 118.

June 1, 2011	June 12, 2029

== See also ==
- List of lunar eclipses and List of 21st-century lunar eclipses
