= April 1948 lunar eclipse =

Partial lunar eclipse April 23, 1948

- Partial eclipse
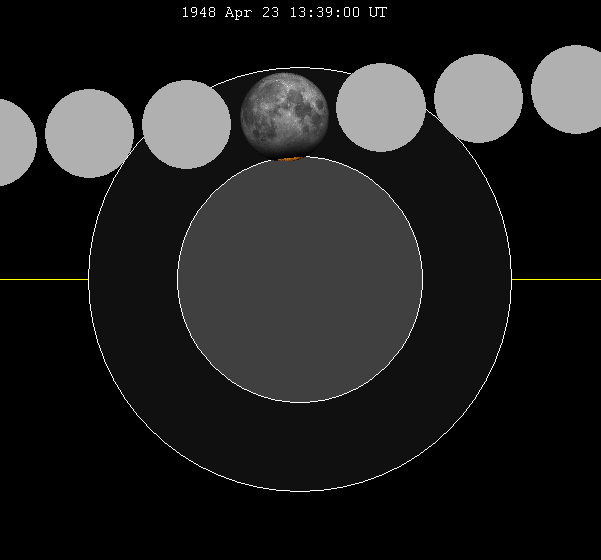
- The Moon's hourly motion shown right to left
- Date: April 23, 1948
- Gamma: 1.0017
- Magnitude: 0.0230
- Saros cycle: 111 (63 of 71)
- Partiality: 34 minutes, 21 seconds
- Penumbral: 257 minutes, 35 seconds
Contacts (UTC)
- P1: 11:29:58
- U1: 13:21:33
- Greatest: 13:38:50
- U4: 13:55:54
- P4: 15:47:34

A partial lunar eclipse occurred at the Moon’s descending node of orbit on Friday, April 23, 1948, with an umbral magnitude of 0.0230. A lunar eclipse occurs when the Moon moves into the Earth's shadow, causing the Moon to be darkened. A partial lunar eclipse occurs when one part of the Moon is in the Earth's umbra, while the other part is in the Earth's penumbra. Unlike a solar eclipse, which can only be viewed from a relatively small area of the world, a lunar eclipse may be viewed from anywhere on the night side of Earth. Occurring about 3.5 days after perigee (on April 20, 1948, at 2:05 UTC), the Moon's apparent diameter was larger.

== Visibility ==
The eclipse was completely visible over east and northeast Asia, Australia, and Antarctica, seen rising over east Africa and the western half of Asia and setting over western North America and the eastern Pacific Ocean.

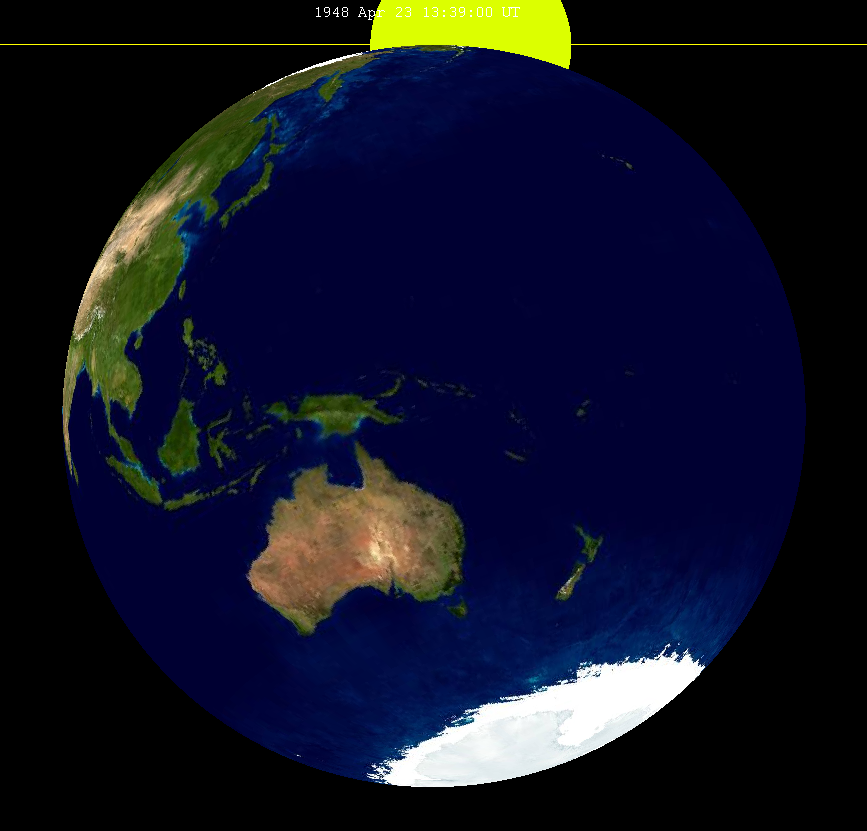
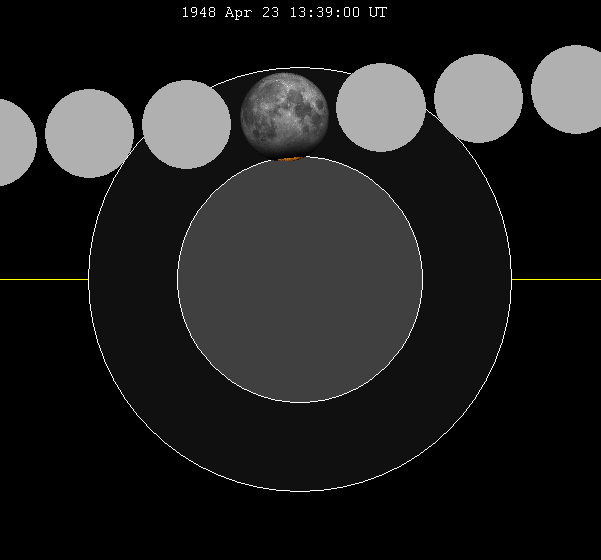

== Eclipse details ==
Shown below is a table displaying details about this particular lunar eclipse. It describes various parameters pertaining to this eclipse.

April 23, 1948 Lunar Eclipse Parameters
Parameter	Value
Penumbral Magnitude	1.01720
Umbral Magnitude	0.02300
Gamma	1.00165
Sun Right Ascension	02h04m17.6s
Sun Declination	+12°37'06.8"
Sun Semi-Diameter	15'54.1"
Sun Equatorial Horizontal Parallax	08.7"
Moon Right Ascension	14h06m01.0s
Moon Declination	-11°44'01.4"
Moon Semi-Diameter	15'59.7"
Moon Equatorial Horizontal Parallax	0°58'42.0"
ΔT	28.4 s

== Eclipse season ==
This eclipse is part of an eclipse season, a period, roughly every six months, when eclipses occur. Only two (or occasionally three) eclipse seasons occur each year, and each season lasts about 35 days and repeats just short of six months (173 days) later; thus two full eclipse seasons always occur each year. Either two or three eclipses happen each eclipse season. In the sequence below, each eclipse is separated by a fortnight.

Eclipse season of April–May 1948
April 23 Descending node (full moon)	May 9 Ascending node (new moon)
Partial lunar eclipse Lunar Saros 111	Annular solar eclipse Solar Saros 137

== Related eclipses ==
=== Eclipses in 1948 ===
- A partial lunar eclipse on April 23.
- An annular solar eclipse on May 9.
- A penumbral lunar eclipse on October 18.
- A total solar eclipse on November 1.

=== Metonic ===
- Preceded by: Lunar eclipse of July 6, 1944
- Followed by: Lunar eclipse of February 11, 1952

=== Tzolkinex ===
- Preceded by: Lunar eclipse of March 13, 1941
- Followed by: Lunar eclipse of June 5, 1955

=== Half-Saros ===
- Preceded by: Solar eclipse of April 19, 1939
- Followed by: Solar eclipse of April 30, 1957

=== Tritos ===
- Preceded by: Lunar eclipse of May 25, 1937
- Followed by: Lunar eclipse of March 24, 1959

=== Lunar Saros 111 ===
- Preceded by: Lunar eclipse of April 13, 1930
- Followed by: Lunar eclipse of May 4, 1966

=== Inex ===
- Preceded by: Lunar eclipse of May 15, 1919
- Followed by: Lunar eclipse of April 4, 1977

=== Triad ===
- Preceded by: Lunar eclipse of June 22, 1861
- Followed by: Lunar eclipse of February 22, 2035

=== Lunar eclipses of 1948–1951 ===
This eclipse is a member of a semester series. An eclipse in a semester series of lunar eclipses repeats approximately every 177 days and 4 hours (a semester) at alternating nodes of the Moon's orbit.

The penumbral lunar eclipses on February 21, 1951 and August 17, 1951 occur in the next lunar year eclipse set.

Lunar eclipse series sets from 1948 to 1951
Descending node				Ascending node			
Saros	Date Viewing	Type Chart	Gamma	Saros	Date Viewing	Type Chart	Gamma
111	1948 Apr 23	Partial	1.0017	116	1948 Oct 18	Penumbral	−1.0245
121	1949 Apr 13	Total	0.2474	126	1949 Oct 07	Total	−0.3219
131	1950 Apr 02	Total	−0.4599	136	1950 Sep 26	Total	0.4101
141	1951 Mar 23	Penumbral	−1.2099	146	1951 Sep 15	Penumbral	1.1187

=== Saros 111 ===
This eclipse is a part of Saros series 111, repeating every 18 years, 11 days, and containing 71 events. The series started with a penumbral lunar eclipse on June 10, 830 AD. It contains partial eclipses from September 14, 992 AD through April 8, 1335; total eclipses from April 19, 1353 through August 4, 1533; and a second set of partial eclipses from August 16, 1551 through April 23, 1948. The series ends at member 71 as a penumbral eclipse on July 19, 2092.

The longest duration of totality was produced by member 35 at 106 minutes, 14 seconds on June 12, 1443. All eclipses in this series occur at the Moon’s descending node of orbit.

Greatest	First			
The greatest eclipse of the series occurred on 1443 Jun 12, lasting 106 minutes, 14 seconds.	Penumbral	Partial	Total	Central
The greatest eclipse of the series occurred on 1443 Jun 12, lasting 106 minutes, 14 seconds.	830 Jun 10	992 Sep 14	1353 Apr 19	1389 May 10
The greatest eclipse of the series occurred on 1443 Jun 12, lasting 106 minutes, 14 seconds.	Last			
The greatest eclipse of the series occurred on 1443 Jun 12, lasting 106 minutes, 14 seconds.	Central	Total	Partial	Penumbral
The greatest eclipse of the series occurred on 1443 Jun 12, lasting 106 minutes, 14 seconds.	1497 Jul 14	1533 Aug 04	1948 Apr 23	2092 Jul 19

Eclipses are tabulated in three columns; every third eclipse in the same column is one exeligmos apart, so they all cast shadows over approximately the same parts of the Earth.

Series members 55–71 occur between 1801 and 2092:
55	56	57
1804 Jan 26	1822 Feb 06	1840 Feb 17
58	59	60
1858 Feb 27	1876 Mar 10	1894 Mar 21
61	62	63
1912 Apr 01	1930 Apr 13	1948 Apr 23
64	65	66
1966 May 04	1984 May 15	2002 May 26
67	68	69
2020 Jun 05	2038 Jun 17	2056 Jun 27
70	71	
2074 Jul 08	2092 Jul 19	

=== Tritos series ===
This eclipse is a part of a tritos cycle, repeating at alternating nodes every 135 synodic months (≈ 3986.63 days, or 11 years minus 1 month). Their appearance and longitude are irregular due to a lack of synchronization with the anomalistic month (period of perigee), but groupings of 3 tritos cycles (≈ 33 years minus 3 months) come close (≈ 434.044 anomalistic months), so eclipses are similar in these groupings.

Series members between 1817 and 2200
1817 May 01 (Saros 99)	1828 Mar 31 (Saros 100)	1839 Feb 28 (Saros 101)	1850 Jan 28 (Saros 102)	1860 Dec 28 (Saros 103)
		1893 Sep 25 (Saros 106)		1915 Jul 26 (Saros 108)
1926 Jun 25 (Saros 109)	1937 May 25 (Saros 110)	1948 Apr 23 (Saros 111)	1959 Mar 24 (Saros 112)	1970 Feb 21 (Saros 113)
1981 Jan 20 (Saros 114)	1991 Dec 21 (Saros 115)	2002 Nov 20 (Saros 116)	2013 Oct 18 (Saros 117)	2024 Sep 18 (Saros 118)
2035 Aug 19 (Saros 119)	2046 Jul 18 (Saros 120)	2057 Jun 17 (Saros 121)	2068 May 17 (Saros 122)	2079 Apr 16 (Saros 123)
2090 Mar 15 (Saros 124)	2101 Feb 14 (Saros 125)	2112 Jan 14 (Saros 126)	2122 Dec 13 (Saros 127)	2133 Nov 12 (Saros 128)
2144 Oct 11 (Saros 129)	2155 Sep 11 (Saros 130)	2166 Aug 11 (Saros 131)	2177 Jul 11 (Saros 132)	2188 Jun 09 (Saros 133)
2199 May 10 (Saros 134)

=== Inex series ===
This eclipse is a part of the long period inex cycle, repeating at alternating nodes, every 358 synodic months (≈ 10,571.95 days, or 29 years minus 20 days). Their appearance and longitude are irregular due to a lack of synchronization with the anomalistic month (period of perigee). However, groupings of 3 inex cycles (≈ 87 years minus 2 months) comes close (≈ 1,151.02 anomalistic months), so eclipses are similar in these groupings.

Series members between 1801 and 2200
1803 Aug 03 (Saros 106)	1832 Jul 12 (Saros 107)	1861 Jun 22 (Saros 108)
1890 Jun 03 (Saros 109)	1919 May 15 (Saros 110)	1948 Apr 23 (Saros 111)
1977 Apr 04 (Saros 112)	2006 Mar 14 (Saros 113)	2035 Feb 22 (Saros 114)
2064 Feb 02 (Saros 115)	2093 Jan 12 (Saros 116)	2121 Dec 24 (Saros 117)
2150 Dec 04 (Saros 118)	2179 Nov 14 (Saros 119)	

=== Half-Saros cycle ===
A lunar eclipse will be preceded and followed by solar eclipses by 9 years and 5.5 days (a half saros). This lunar eclipse is related to two annular solar eclipses of Solar Saros 118.

April 19, 1939	April 30, 1957

== See also ==
- List of lunar eclipses
- List of 20th-century lunar eclipses
