= January 2046 lunar eclipse =

Astronomical event

- Partial eclipse
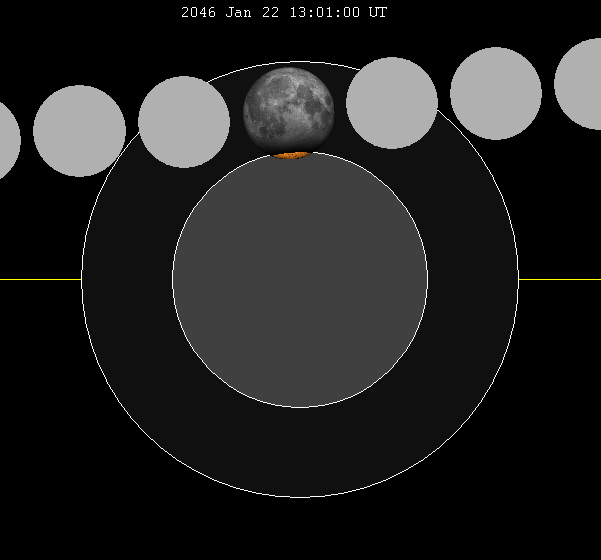
- The Moon's hourly motion shown right to left
- Date: January 22, 2046
- Gamma: 0.9885
- Magnitude: 0.0550
- Saros cycle: 115 (59 of 72)
- Partiality: 50 minutes, 23 seconds
- Penumbral: 250 minutes, 1 second
Contacts (UTC)
- P1: 10:56:07
- U1: 12:35:59
- Greatest: 13:01:07
- U4: 13:26:22
- P4: 15:06:08

A partial lunar eclipse will occur at the Moon’s descending node of orbit on Monday, January 22, 2046, with an umbral magnitude of 0.0550. A lunar eclipse occurs when the Moon moves into the Earth's shadow, causing the Moon to be darkened. A partial lunar eclipse occurs when one part of the Moon is in the Earth's umbra, while the other part is in the Earth's penumbra. Unlike a solar eclipse, which can only be viewed from a relatively small area of the world, a lunar eclipse may be viewed from anywhere on the night side of Earth. Occurring about 1.1 days before perigee (on January 23, 2046, at 14:00 UTC), the Moon's apparent diameter will be larger.

== Visibility ==
The eclipse will be completely visible over Australia, east and north Asia, and northwestern North America, seen rising over eastern Europe and west, central, and south Asia and setting over much of North America.

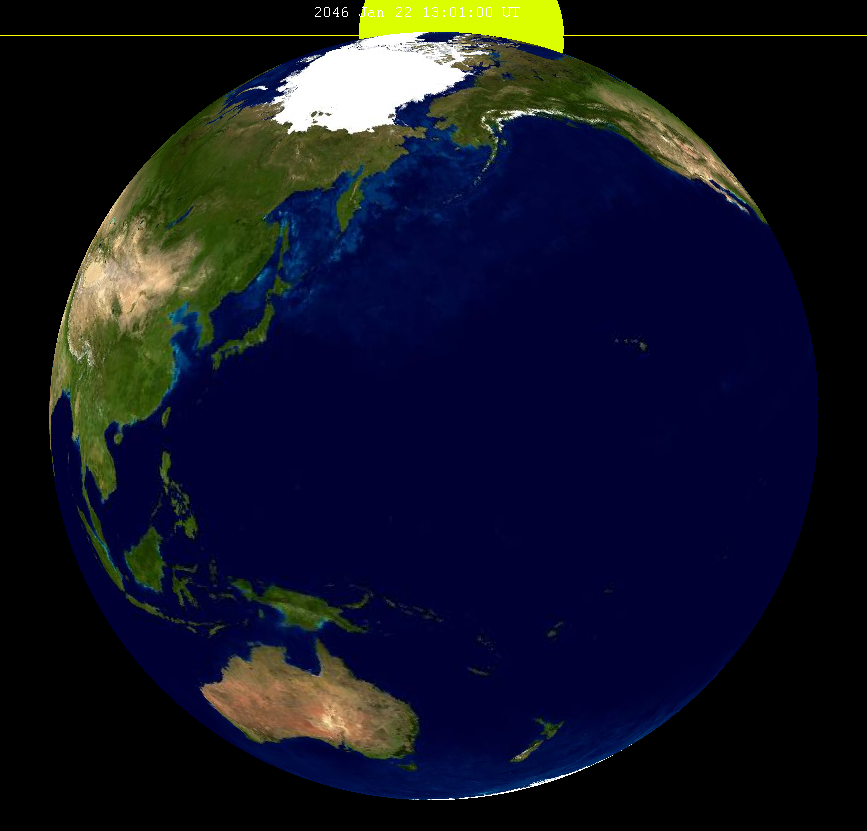
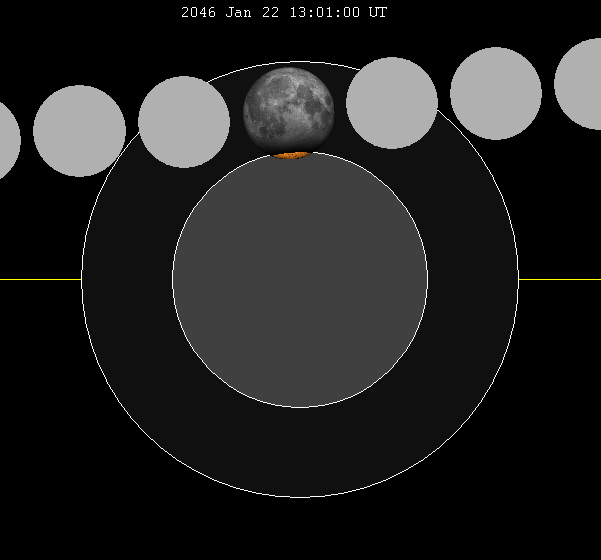

== Eclipse details ==
Shown below is a table displaying details about this particular lunar eclipse. It describes various parameters pertaining to this eclipse.

January 22, 2046 Lunar Eclipse Parameters
Parameter	Value
Penumbral Magnitude	1.03650
Umbral Magnitude	0.05499
Gamma	0.98859
Sun Right Ascension	20h19m45.5s
Sun Declination	-19°33'42.8"
Sun Semi-Diameter	16'15.1"
Sun Equatorial Horizontal Parallax	08.9"
Moon Right Ascension	08h21m07.9s
Moon Declination	+20°30'34.8"
Moon Semi-Diameter	16'33.4"
Moon Equatorial Horizontal Parallax	1°00'46.0"
ΔT	82.6 s

== Eclipse season ==
This eclipse is part of an eclipse season, a period, roughly every six months, when eclipses occur. Only two (or occasionally three) eclipse seasons occur each year, and each season lasts about 35 days and repeats just short of six months (173 days) later; thus two full eclipse seasons always occur each year. Either two or three eclipses happen each eclipse season. In the sequence below, each eclipse is separated by a fortnight.

Eclipse season of January–February 2046
January 22 Descending node (full moon)	February 5 Ascending node (new moon)
Partial lunar eclipse Lunar Saros 115	Annular solar eclipse Solar Saros 141

== Related eclipses ==
=== Eclipses in 2046 ===
- A partial lunar eclipse on January 22.
- An annular solar eclipse on February 5.
- A partial lunar eclipse on July 18.
- A total solar eclipse on August 2.

=== Metonic ===
- Preceded by: Lunar eclipse of April 5, 2042
- Followed by: Lunar eclipse of November 9, 2049

=== Tzolkinex ===
- Preceded by: Lunar eclipse of December 11, 2038
- Followed by: Lunar eclipse of March 4, 2053

=== Half-Saros ===
- Preceded by: Solar eclipse of January 16, 2037
- Followed by: Solar eclipse of January 27, 2055

=== Tritos ===
- Preceded by: Lunar eclipse of February 22, 2035
- Followed by: Lunar eclipse of December 22, 2056

=== Lunar Saros 115 ===
- Preceded by: Lunar eclipse of January 12, 2028
- Followed by: Lunar eclipse of February 2, 2064

=== Inex ===
- Preceded by: Lunar eclipse of February 11, 2017
- Followed by: Lunar eclipse of January 2, 2075

=== Triad ===
- Preceded by: Lunar eclipse of March 24, 1959
- Followed by: Lunar eclipse of November 23, 2132

=== Lunar eclipses of 2046–2049 ===
This eclipse is a member of a semester series. An eclipse in a semester series of lunar eclipses repeats approximately every 177 days and 4 hours (a semester) at alternating nodes of the Moon's orbit.

The penumbral lunar eclipses on May 17, 2049 and November 9, 2049 occur in the next lunar year eclipse set.

Lunar eclipse series sets from 2046 to 2049
Descending node				Ascending node			
Saros	Date Viewing	Type Chart	Gamma	Saros	Date Viewing	Type Chart	Gamma
115	2046 Jan 22	Partial	0.9885	120	2046 Jul 18	Partial	−0.8691
125	2047 Jan 12	Total	0.3317	130	2047 Jul 07	Total	−0.0636
135	2048 Jan 01	Total	−0.3745	140	2048 Jun 26	Partial	0.6796
145	2048 Dec 20	Penumbral	−1.0624	150	2049 Jun 15	Penumbral	1.4068

=== Saros 115 ===
This eclipse is a part of Saros series 115, repeating every 18 years, 11 days, and containing 72 events. The series started with a penumbral lunar eclipse on April 21, 1000. It contains partial eclipses from July 6, 1126 through September 30, 1270; total eclipses from October 11, 1288 through July 20, 1739; and a second set of partial eclipses from July 30, 1757 through February 13, 2082. The series ends at member 72 as a penumbral eclipse on June 13, 2280.

The longest duration of totality was produced by member 36 at 99 minutes, 47 seconds on May 15, 1631. All eclipses in this series occur at the Moon’s descending node of orbit.

Greatest	First			
The greatest eclipse of the series occurred on 1631 May 15, lasting 99 minutes, 47 seconds.	Penumbral	Partial	Total	Central
The greatest eclipse of the series occurred on 1631 May 15, lasting 99 minutes, 47 seconds.	1000 Apr 21	1126 Jul 06	1288 Oct 11	1541 Mar 12
The greatest eclipse of the series occurred on 1631 May 15, lasting 99 minutes, 47 seconds.	Last			
The greatest eclipse of the series occurred on 1631 May 15, lasting 99 minutes, 47 seconds.	Central	Total	Partial	Penumbral
The greatest eclipse of the series occurred on 1631 May 15, lasting 99 minutes, 47 seconds.	1685 Jun 16	1739 Jul 20	2082 Feb 13	2280 Jun 13

Eclipses are tabulated in three columns; every third eclipse in the same column is one exeligmos apart, so they all cast shadows over approximately the same parts of the Earth.

Series members 46–67 occur between 1801 and 2200:
46	47	48
1811 Sep 02	1829 Sep 13	1847 Sep 24
49	50	51
1865 Oct 04	1883 Oct 16	1901 Oct 27
52	53	54
1919 Nov 07	1937 Nov 18	1955 Nov 29
55	56	57
1973 Dec 10	1991 Dec 21	2009 Dec 31
58	59	60
2028 Jan 12	2046 Jan 22	2064 Feb 02
61	62	63
2082 Feb 13	2100 Feb 24	2118 Mar 07
64	65	66
2136 Mar 18	2154 Mar 29	2172 Apr 09
67
2190 Apr 20

=== Tritos series ===
This eclipse is a part of a tritos cycle, repeating at alternating nodes every 135 synodic months (≈ 3986.63 days, or 11 years minus 1 month). Their appearance and longitude are irregular due to a lack of synchronization with the anomalistic month (period of perigee), but groupings of 3 tritos cycles (≈ 33 years minus 3 months) come close (≈ 434.044 anomalistic months), so eclipses are similar in these groupings.

Series members between 1904 and 2200
1904 Mar 02 (Saros 102)	1915 Jan 31 (Saros 103)			
	1969 Aug 27 (Saros 108)	1980 Jul 27 (Saros 109)	1991 Jun 27 (Saros 110)	2002 May 26 (Saros 111)
2013 Apr 25 (Saros 112)	2024 Mar 25 (Saros 113)	2035 Feb 22 (Saros 114)	2046 Jan 22 (Saros 115)	2056 Dec 22 (Saros 116)
2067 Nov 21 (Saros 117)	2078 Oct 21 (Saros 118)	2089 Sep 19 (Saros 119)	2100 Aug 19 (Saros 120)	2111 Jul 21 (Saros 121)
2122 Jun 20 (Saros 122)	2133 May 19 (Saros 123)	2144 Apr 18 (Saros 124)	2155 Mar 19 (Saros 125)	2166 Feb 15 (Saros 126)
2177 Jan 14 (Saros 127)	2187 Dec 15 (Saros 128)	2198 Nov 13 (Saros 129)		

=== Inex series ===
This eclipse is a part of the long period inex cycle, repeating at alternating nodes, every 358 synodic months (≈ 10,571.95 days, or 29 years minus 20 days). Their appearance and longitude are irregular due to a lack of synchronization with the anomalistic month (period of perigee). However, groupings of 3 inex cycles (≈ 87 years minus 2 months) comes close (≈ 1,151.02 anomalistic months), so eclipses are similar in these groupings.

Series members between 1801 and 2200
1814 Jul 02 (Saros 107)	1843 Jun 12 (Saros 108)	1872 May 22 (Saros 109)
1901 May 03 (Saros 110)	1930 Apr 13 (Saros 111)	1959 Mar 24 (Saros 112)
1988 Mar 03 (Saros 113)	2017 Feb 11 (Saros 114)	2046 Jan 22 (Saros 115)
2075 Jan 02 (Saros 116)	2103 Dec 13 (Saros 117)	2132 Nov 23 (Saros 118)
2161 Nov 03 (Saros 119)	2190 Oct 13 (Saros 120)	

=== Half-Saros cycle ===
A lunar eclipse will be preceded and followed by solar eclipses by 9 years and 5.5 days (a half saros). This lunar eclipse is related to two partial solar eclipses of Solar Saros 122.

January 16, 2037	January 27, 2055

== See also ==
- List of lunar eclipses and List of 21st-century lunar eclipses
