= November 1937 lunar eclipse =

Partial lunar eclipse November 18, 1937

- Partial eclipse
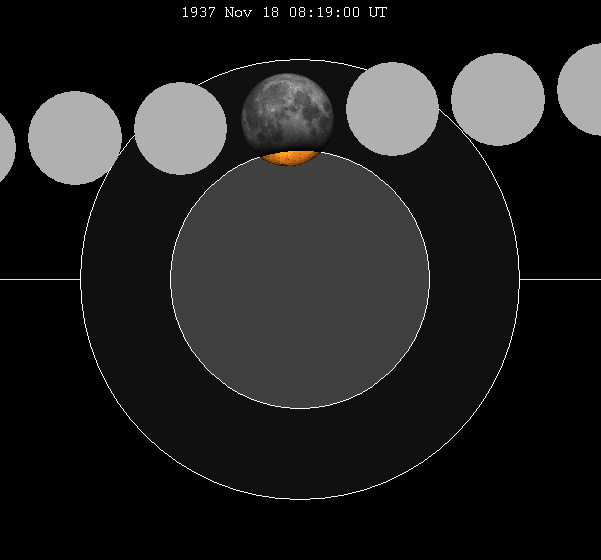
- The Moon's hourly motion shown right to left
- Date: November 18, 1937
- Gamma: 0.9421
- Magnitude: 0.1443
- Saros cycle: 115 (53 of 72)
- Partiality: 81 minutes, 19 seconds
- Penumbral: 254 minutes, 32 seconds
Contacts (UTC)
- P1: 6:11:47
- U1: 7:38:24
- Greatest: 8:19:02
- U4: 8:59:43
- P4: 10:26:19

A partial lunar eclipse occurred at the Moon’s descending node of orbit on Thursday, November 18, 1937, with an umbral magnitude of 0.1443. A lunar eclipse occurs when the Moon moves into the Earth's shadow, causing the Moon to be darkened. A partial lunar eclipse occurs when one part of the Moon is in the Earth's umbra, while the other part is in the Earth's penumbra. Unlike a solar eclipse, which can only be viewed from a relatively small area of the world, a lunar eclipse may be viewed from anywhere on the night side of Earth. Occurring only about 18 hours before perigee (on November 19, 1937, at 0:30 UTC), the Moon's apparent diameter was larger.

== Visibility ==
The eclipse was completely visible over much of northeast Asia, North America, and northwestern South America, seen rising over east Asia and Australia and setting over much of South America, west Africa, and western Europe.

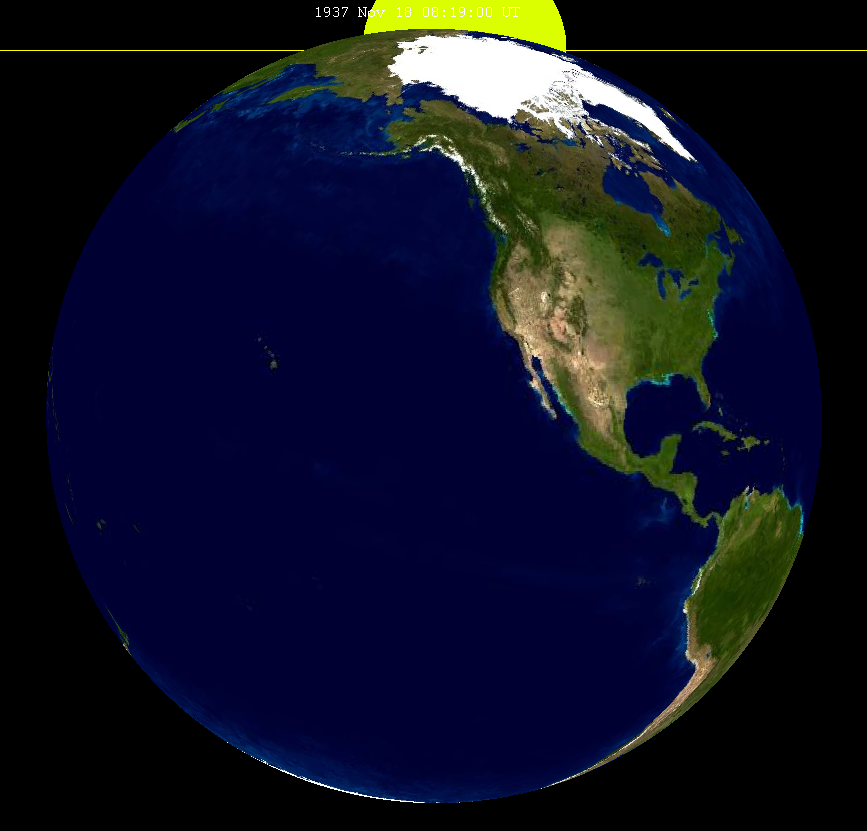
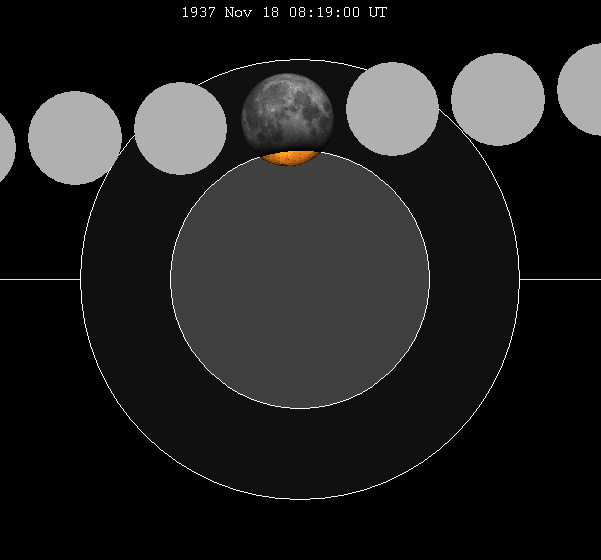

== Eclipse details ==
Shown below is a table displaying details about this particular lunar eclipse. It describes various parameters pertaining to this eclipse.

November 18, 1937 Lunar Eclipse Parameters
Parameter	Value
Penumbral Magnitude	1.11408
Umbral Magnitude	0.14432
Gamma	0.94213
Sun Right Ascension	15h32m59.8s
Sun Declination	-19°09'44.0"
Sun Semi-Diameter	16'11.0"
Sun Equatorial Horizontal Parallax	08.9"
Moon Right Ascension	03h32m24.7s
Moon Declination	+20°06'50.3"
Moon Semi-Diameter	16'41.3"
Moon Equatorial Horizontal Parallax	1°01'14.9"
ΔT	23.9 s

== Eclipse season ==
This eclipse is part of an eclipse season, a period, roughly every six months, when eclipses occur. Only two (or occasionally three) eclipse seasons occur each year, and each season lasts about 35 days and repeats just short of six months (173 days) later; thus two full eclipse seasons always occur each year. Either two or three eclipses happen each eclipse season. In the sequence below, each eclipse is separated by a fortnight.

Eclipse season of November–December 1937
November 18 Descending node (full moon)	December 2 Ascending node (new moon)
Partial lunar eclipse Lunar Saros 115	Annular solar eclipse Solar Saros 141

== Related eclipses ==
=== Eclipses in 1937 ===
- A penumbral lunar eclipse on May 25.
- A total solar eclipse on June 8.
- A partial lunar eclipse on November 18.
- An annular solar eclipse on December 2.

=== Metonic ===
- Preceded by: Lunar eclipse of January 30, 1934
- Followed by: Lunar eclipse of September 5, 1941

=== Tzolkinex ===
- Preceded by: Lunar eclipse of October 7, 1930
- Followed by: Lunar eclipse of December 29, 1944

=== Half-Saros ===
- Preceded by: Solar eclipse of November 12, 1928
- Followed by: Solar eclipse of November 23, 1946

=== Tritos ===
- Preceded by: Lunar eclipse of December 19, 1926
- Followed by: Lunar eclipse of October 18, 1948

=== Lunar Saros 115 ===
- Preceded by: Lunar eclipse of November 7, 1919
- Followed by: Lunar eclipse of November 29, 1955

=== Inex ===
- Preceded by: Lunar eclipse of December 7, 1908
- Followed by: Lunar eclipse of October 29, 1966

=== Triad ===
- Preceded by: Lunar eclipse of January 17, 1851
- Followed by: Lunar eclipse of September 18, 2024

=== Lunar eclipses of 1937–1940 ===
This eclipse is a member of a semester series. An eclipse in a semester series of lunar eclipses repeats approximately every 177 days and 4 hours (a semester) at alternating nodes of the Moon's orbit.

The penumbral lunar eclipse on March 23, 1940 occurs in the next lunar year eclipse set.

Lunar eclipse series sets from 1937 to 1940
Ascending node				Descending node			
Saros	Date Viewing	Type Chart	Gamma	Saros	Date Viewing	Type Chart	Gamma
110	1937 May 25	Penumbral	−1.1582	115	1937 Nov 18	Partial	0.9421
120	1938 May 14	Total	−0.3994	125	1938 Nov 07	Total	0.2739
130	1939 May 03	Total	0.3693	135	1939 Oct 28	Partial	−0.4581
140	1940 Apr 22	Penumbral	1.0741	145	1940 Oct 16	Penumbral	−1.1925

=== Saros 115 ===
This eclipse is a part of Saros series 115, repeating every 18 years, 11 days, and containing 72 events. The series started with a penumbral lunar eclipse on April 21, 1000. It contains partial eclipses from July 6, 1126 through September 30, 1270; total eclipses from October 11, 1288 through July 20, 1739; and a second set of partial eclipses from July 30, 1757 through February 13, 2082. The series ends at member 72 as a penumbral eclipse on June 13, 2280.

The longest duration of totality was produced by member 36 at 99 minutes, 47 seconds on May 15, 1631. All eclipses in this series occur at the Moon’s descending node of orbit.

Greatest	First			
The greatest eclipse of the series occurred on 1631 May 15, lasting 99 minutes, 47 seconds.	Penumbral	Partial	Total	Central
The greatest eclipse of the series occurred on 1631 May 15, lasting 99 minutes, 47 seconds.	1000 Apr 21	1126 Jul 06	1288 Oct 11	1541 Mar 12
The greatest eclipse of the series occurred on 1631 May 15, lasting 99 minutes, 47 seconds.	Last			
The greatest eclipse of the series occurred on 1631 May 15, lasting 99 minutes, 47 seconds.	Central	Total	Partial	Penumbral
The greatest eclipse of the series occurred on 1631 May 15, lasting 99 minutes, 47 seconds.	1685 Jun 16	1739 Jul 20	2082 Feb 13	2280 Jun 13

Eclipses are tabulated in three columns; every third eclipse in the same column is one exeligmos apart, so they all cast shadows over approximately the same parts of the Earth.

Series members 46–67 occur between 1801 and 2200:
46	47	48
1811 Sep 02	1829 Sep 13	1847 Sep 24
49	50	51
1865 Oct 04	1883 Oct 16	1901 Oct 27
52	53	54
1919 Nov 07	1937 Nov 18	1955 Nov 29
55	56	57
1973 Dec 10	1991 Dec 21	2009 Dec 31
58	59	60
2028 Jan 12	2046 Jan 22	2064 Feb 02
61	62	63
2082 Feb 13	2100 Feb 24	2118 Mar 07
64	65	66
2136 Mar 18	2154 Mar 29	2172 Apr 09
67
2190 Apr 20

=== Tritos series ===
This eclipse is a part of a tritos cycle, repeating at alternating nodes every 135 synodic months (≈ 3986.63 days, or 11 years minus 1 month). Their appearance and longitude are irregular due to a lack of synchronization with the anomalistic month (period of perigee), but groupings of 3 tritos cycles (≈ 33 years minus 3 months) come close (≈ 434.044 anomalistic months), so eclipses are similar in these groupings.

Series members between 1801 and 2200
1806 Nov 26 (Saros 103)		1828 Sep 23 (Saros 105)	1839 Aug 24 (Saros 106)	1850 Jul 24 (Saros 107)
1861 Jun 22 (Saros 108)	1872 May 22 (Saros 109)	1883 Apr 22 (Saros 110)	1894 Mar 21 (Saros 111)	1905 Feb 19 (Saros 112)
1916 Jan 20 (Saros 113)	1926 Dec 19 (Saros 114)	1937 Nov 18 (Saros 115)	1948 Oct 18 (Saros 116)	1959 Sep 17 (Saros 117)
1970 Aug 17 (Saros 118)	1981 Jul 17 (Saros 119)	1992 Jun 15 (Saros 120)	2003 May 16 (Saros 121)	2014 Apr 15 (Saros 122)
2025 Mar 14 (Saros 123)	2036 Feb 11 (Saros 124)	2047 Jan 12 (Saros 125)	2057 Dec 11 (Saros 126)	2068 Nov 09 (Saros 127)
2079 Oct 10 (Saros 128)	2090 Sep 08 (Saros 129)	2101 Aug 09 (Saros 130)	2112 Jul 09 (Saros 131)	2123 Jun 09 (Saros 132)
2134 May 08 (Saros 133)	2145 Apr 07 (Saros 134)	2156 Mar 07 (Saros 135)	2167 Feb 04 (Saros 136)	2178 Jan 04 (Saros 137)
2188 Dec 04 (Saros 138)	2199 Nov 02 (Saros 139)			

=== Inex series ===
This eclipse is a part of the long period inex cycle, repeating at alternating nodes, every 358 synodic months (≈ 10,571.95 days, or 29 years minus 20 days). Their appearance and longitude are irregular due to a lack of synchronization with the anomalistic month (period of perigee). However, groupings of 3 inex cycles (≈ 87 years minus 2 months) comes close (≈ 1,151.02 anomalistic months), so eclipses are similar in these groupings.

Series members between 1801 and 2200
1822 Feb 06 (Saros 111)	1851 Jan 17 (Saros 112)	1879 Dec 28 (Saros 113)
1908 Dec 07 (Saros 114)	1937 Nov 18 (Saros 115)	1966 Oct 29 (Saros 116)
1995 Oct 08 (Saros 117)	2024 Sep 18 (Saros 118)	2053 Aug 29 (Saros 119)
2082 Aug 08 (Saros 120)	2111 Jul 21 (Saros 121)	2140 Jun 30 (Saros 122)
2169 Jun 09 (Saros 123)	2198 May 20 (Saros 124)	

=== Half-Saros cycle ===
A lunar eclipse will be preceded and followed by solar eclipses by 9 years and 5.5 days (a half saros). This lunar eclipse is related to two partial solar eclipses of Solar Saros 122.

November 12, 1928	November 23, 1946

== See also ==
- List of lunar eclipses
- List of 20th-century lunar eclipses
