= January 2028 lunar eclipse =

Astronomical event

- Partial eclipse
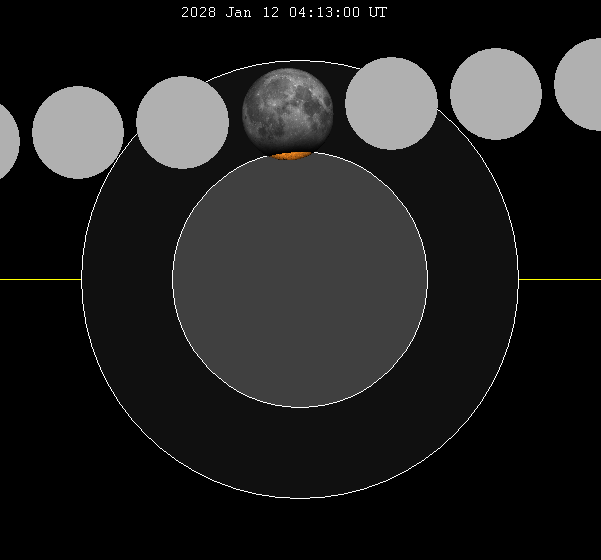
- The Moon's hourly motion shown right to left
- Date: January 12, 2028
- Gamma: 0.9817
- Magnitude: 0.0679
- Saros cycle: 115 (58 of 72)
- Partiality: 56 minutes, 0 seconds
- Penumbral: 250 minutes, 41 seconds
Contacts (UTC)
- P1: 2:07:37
- U1: 3:45:00
- Greatest: 4:12:57
- U4: 4:41:00
- P4: 6:18:18

A partial lunar eclipse will occur at the Moon’s descending node of orbit on Wednesday, January 12, 2028, with an umbral magnitude of 0.0679. A lunar eclipse occurs when the Moon moves into the Earth's shadow, causing the Moon to be darkened. A partial lunar eclipse occurs when one part of the Moon is in the Earth's umbra, while the other part is in the Earth's penumbra. Unlike a solar eclipse, which can only be viewed from a relatively small area of the world, a lunar eclipse may be viewed from anywhere on the night side of Earth. Occurring only about 22.5 hours before perigee (on January 13, 2028, at 2:45 UTC), the Moon's apparent diameter will be larger.

== Visibility ==
The eclipse will be completely visible over North and South America, west Africa, and Europe, seen rising over the central Pacific Ocean and setting over central and east Africa and west and central Asia.

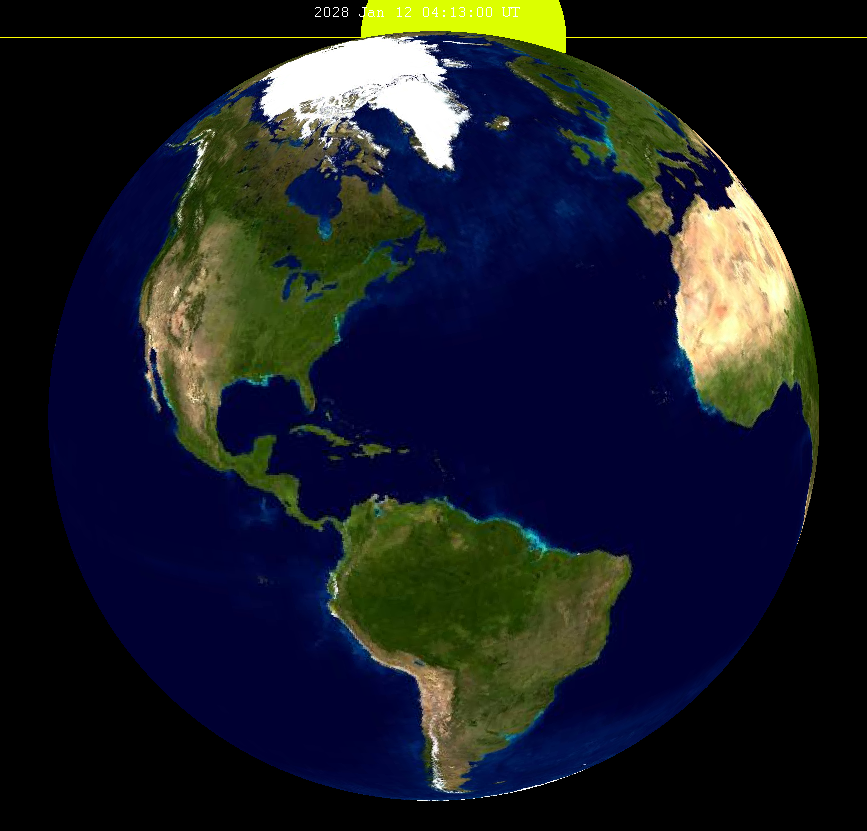
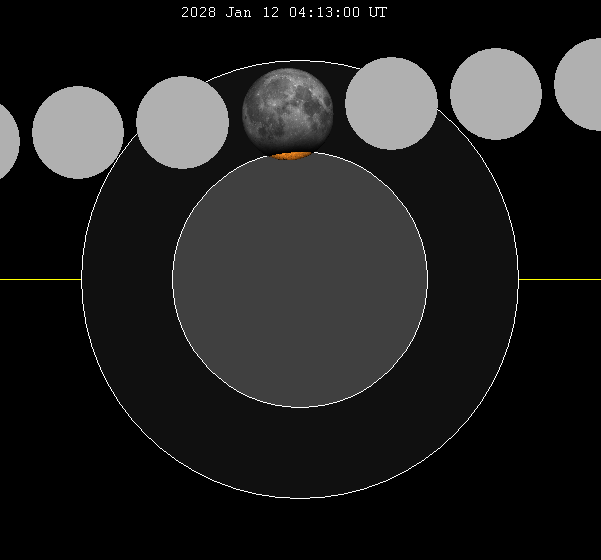

== Eclipse details ==
Shown below is a table displaying details about this particular lunar eclipse. It describes various parameters pertaining to this eclipse.

January 12, 2028 Lunar Eclipse Parameters
Parameter	Value
Penumbral Magnitude	1.04848
Umbral Magnitude	0.06787
Gamma	0.98177
Sun Right Ascension	19h32m47.8s
Sun Declination	-21°43'29.4"
Sun Semi-Diameter	16'15.8"
Sun Equatorial Horizontal Parallax	08.9"
Moon Right Ascension	07h33m53.0s
Moon Declination	+22°41'18.2"
Moon Semi-Diameter	16'35.1"
Moon Equatorial Horizontal Parallax	1°00'52.0"
ΔT	73.0 s

== Eclipse season ==
This eclipse is part of an eclipse season, a period, roughly every six months, when eclipses occur. Only two (or occasionally three) eclipse seasons occur each year, and each season lasts about 35 days and repeats just short of six months (173 days) later; thus two full eclipse seasons always occur each year. Either two or three eclipses happen each eclipse season. In the sequence below, each eclipse is separated by a fortnight.

Eclipse season of January 2028
January 12 Descending node (full moon)	January 26 Ascending node (new moon)
Partial lunar eclipse Lunar Saros 115	Annular solar eclipse Solar Saros 141

== Related eclipses ==
=== Eclipses in 2028 ===
- A partial lunar eclipse on January 12.
- An annular solar eclipse on January 26.
- A partial lunar eclipse on July 6.
- A total solar eclipse on July 22.
- A total lunar eclipse on December 31.

=== Metonic ===
- Preceded by: Lunar eclipse of March 25, 2024
- Followed by: Lunar eclipse of October 30, 2031

=== Tzolkinex ===
- Preceded by: Lunar eclipse of November 30, 2020
- Followed by: Lunar eclipse of February 22, 2035

=== Half-Saros ===
- Preceded by: Solar eclipse of January 6, 2019
- Followed by: Solar eclipse of January 16, 2037

=== Tritos ===
- Preceded by: Lunar eclipse of February 11, 2017
- Followed by: Lunar eclipse of December 11, 2038

=== Lunar Saros 115 ===
- Preceded by: Lunar eclipse of December 31, 2009
- Followed by: Lunar eclipse of January 22, 2046

=== Inex ===
- Preceded by: Lunar eclipse of January 31, 1999
- Followed by: Lunar eclipse of December 22, 2056

=== Triad ===
- Preceded by: Lunar eclipse of March 13, 1941
- Followed by: Lunar eclipse of November 12, 2114

=== Lunar eclipses of 2027–2031 ===
This eclipse is a member of a semester series. An eclipse in a semester series of lunar eclipses repeats approximately every 177 days and 4 hours (a semester) at alternating nodes of the Moon's orbit.

The penumbral lunar eclipses on February 20, 2027 and August 17, 2027 occur in the previous lunar year eclipse set, and the penumbral lunar eclipses on May 7, 2031 and October 30, 2031 occur in the next lunar year eclipse set.

Lunar eclipse series sets from 2027 to 2031
Ascending node				Descending node			
Saros	Date Viewing	Type Chart	Gamma	Saros	Date Viewing	Type Chart	Gamma
110	2027 Jul 18	Penumbral	−1.5759	115	2028 Jan 12	Partial	0.9818
120	2028 Jul 06	Partial	−0.7904	125	2028 Dec 31	Total	0.3258
130	2029 Jun 26	Total	0.0124	135	2029 Dec 20	Total	−0.3811
140	2030 Jun 15	Partial	0.7535	145	2030 Dec 09	Penumbral	−1.0732
150	2031 Jun 05	Penumbral	1.4732				

=== Saros 115 ===
This eclipse is a part of Saros series 115, repeating every 18 years, 11 days, and containing 72 events. The series started with a penumbral lunar eclipse on April 21, 1000. It contains partial eclipses from July 6, 1126 through September 30, 1270; total eclipses from October 11, 1288 through July 20, 1739; and a second set of partial eclipses from July 30, 1757 through February 13, 2082. The series ends at member 72 as a penumbral eclipse on June 13, 2280.

The longest duration of totality was produced by member 36 at 99 minutes, 47 seconds on May 15, 1631. All eclipses in this series occur at the Moon’s descending node of orbit.

Greatest	First			
The greatest eclipse of the series occurred on 1631 May 15, lasting 99 minutes, 47 seconds.	Penumbral	Partial	Total	Central
The greatest eclipse of the series occurred on 1631 May 15, lasting 99 minutes, 47 seconds.	1000 Apr 21	1126 Jul 06	1288 Oct 11	1541 Mar 12
The greatest eclipse of the series occurred on 1631 May 15, lasting 99 minutes, 47 seconds.	Last			
The greatest eclipse of the series occurred on 1631 May 15, lasting 99 minutes, 47 seconds.	Central	Total	Partial	Penumbral
The greatest eclipse of the series occurred on 1631 May 15, lasting 99 minutes, 47 seconds.	1685 Jun 16	1739 Jul 20	2082 Feb 13	2280 Jun 13

Eclipses are tabulated in three columns; every third eclipse in the same column is one exeligmos apart, so they all cast shadows over approximately the same parts of the Earth.

Series members 46–67 occur between 1801 and 2200:
46	47	48
1811 Sep 02	1829 Sep 13	1847 Sep 24
49	50	51
1865 Oct 04	1883 Oct 16	1901 Oct 27
52	53	54
1919 Nov 07	1937 Nov 18	1955 Nov 29
55	56	57
1973 Dec 10	1991 Dec 21	2009 Dec 31
58	59	60
2028 Jan 12	2046 Jan 22	2064 Feb 02
61	62	63
2082 Feb 13	2100 Feb 24	2118 Mar 07
64	65	66
2136 Mar 18	2154 Mar 29	2172 Apr 09
67
2190 Apr 20

=== Tritos series ===
This eclipse is a part of a tritos cycle, repeating at alternating nodes every 135 synodic months (≈ 3986.63 days, or 11 years minus 1 month). Their appearance and longitude are irregular due to a lack of synchronization with the anomalistic month (period of perigee), but groupings of 3 tritos cycles (≈ 33 years minus 3 months) come close (≈ 434.044 anomalistic months), so eclipses are similar in these groupings.

Series members between 1886 and 2200
1886 Feb 18 (Saros 102)	1897 Jan 18 (Saros 103)			
	1951 Aug 17 (Saros 108)	1962 Jul 17 (Saros 109)	1973 Jun 15 (Saros 110)	1984 May 15 (Saros 111)
1995 Apr 15 (Saros 112)	2006 Mar 14 (Saros 113)	2017 Feb 11 (Saros 114)	2028 Jan 12 (Saros 115)	2038 Dec 11 (Saros 116)
2049 Nov 09 (Saros 117)	2060 Oct 09 (Saros 118)	2071 Sep 09 (Saros 119)	2082 Aug 08 (Saros 120)	2093 Jul 08 (Saros 121)
2104 Jun 08 (Saros 122)	2115 May 08 (Saros 123)	2126 Apr 07 (Saros 124)	2137 Mar 07 (Saros 125)	2148 Feb 04 (Saros 126)
2159 Jan 04 (Saros 127)	2169 Dec 04 (Saros 128)	2180 Nov 02 (Saros 129)	2191 Oct 02 (Saros 130)	

=== Inex series ===
This eclipse is a part of the long period inex cycle, repeating at alternating nodes, every 358 synodic months (≈ 10,571.95 days, or 29 years minus 20 days). Their appearance and longitude are irregular due to a lack of synchronization with the anomalistic month (period of perigee). However, groupings of 3 inex cycles (≈ 87 years minus 2 months) comes close (≈ 1,151.02 anomalistic months), so eclipses are similar in these groupings.

Series members between 1801 and 2200
1825 Jun 01 (Saros 108)	1854 May 12 (Saros 109)	1883 Apr 22 (Saros 110)
1912 Apr 01 (Saros 111)	1941 Mar 13 (Saros 112)	1970 Feb 21 (Saros 113)
1999 Jan 31 (Saros 114)	2028 Jan 12 (Saros 115)	2056 Dec 22 (Saros 116)
2085 Dec 01 (Saros 117)	2114 Nov 12 (Saros 118)	2143 Oct 23 (Saros 119)
2172 Oct 02 (Saros 120)

=== Half-Saros cycle ===
A lunar eclipse will be preceded and followed by solar eclipses by 9 years and 5.5 days (a half saros). This lunar eclipse is related to two partial solar eclipses of Solar Saros 122.

January 6, 2019	January 16, 2037

== See also ==
- List of lunar eclipses and List of 21st-century lunar eclipses
