= December 1973 lunar eclipse =

Partial lunar eclipse

- Partial eclipse
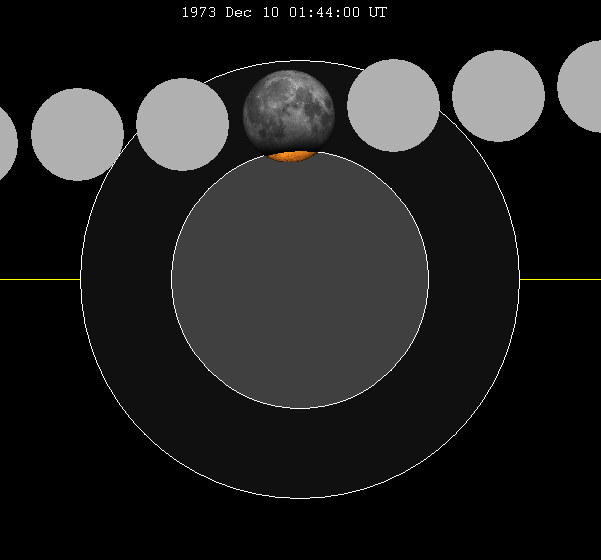
- The Moon's hourly motion shown right to left
- Date: December 10, 1973
- Gamma: 0.9644
- Magnitude: 0.1007
- Saros cycle: 115 (55 of 72)
- Partiality: 68 minutes, 28 seconds
- Penumbral: 252 minutes, 1 second
Contacts (UTC)
- P1: 23:38:22
- U1: 1:10:10
- Greatest: 1:44:22
- U4: 2:18:39
- P4: 3:50:23

A partial lunar eclipse occurred at the Moon’s descending node of orbit on Monday, December 10, 1973, with an umbral magnitude of 0.1007. A lunar eclipse occurs when the Moon moves into the Earth's shadow, causing the Moon to be darkened. A partial lunar eclipse occurs when one part of the Moon is in the Earth's umbra, while the other part is in the Earth's penumbra. Unlike a solar eclipse, which can only be viewed from a relatively small area of the world, a lunar eclipse may be viewed from anywhere on the night side of Earth. Occurring only about 21 hours before perigee (on December 10, 1973, at 22:20 UTC), the Moon's apparent diameter was larger.

This eclipse was the last of four lunar eclipses in 1973, with the others occurring on January 18 (penumbral), June 15 (penumbral), and July 15 (penumbral).

== Visibility ==
The eclipse was completely visible over much of North and South America, Africa, Europe, and west and north Asia, seen rising over western North America and the eastern Pacific Ocean and setting over southeast Africa and much of Asia.

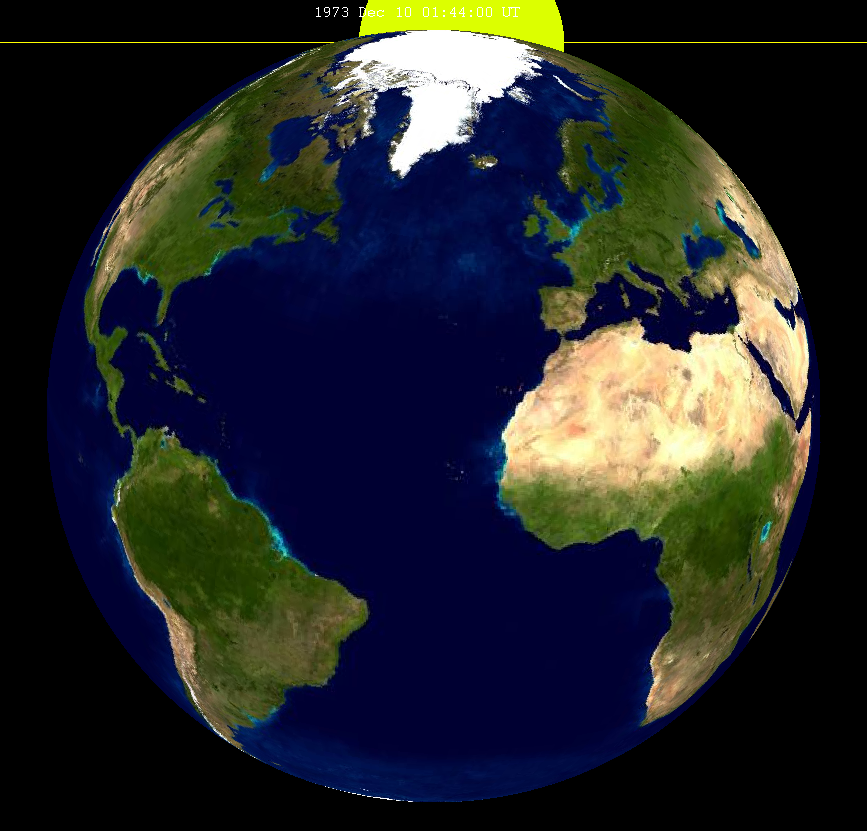
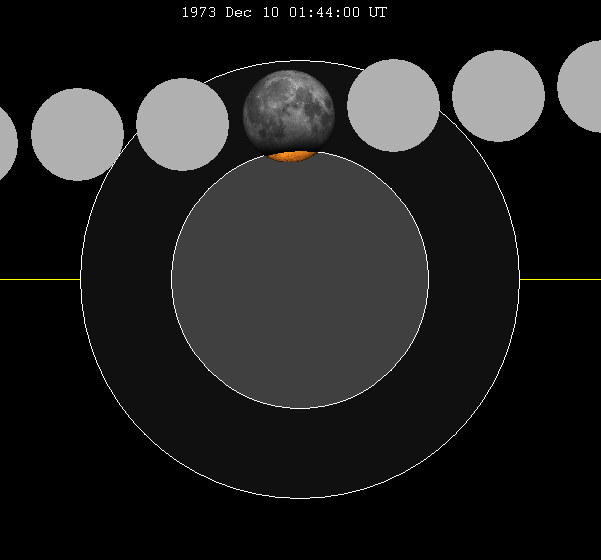

== Eclipse details ==
Shown below is a table displaying details about this particular lunar eclipse. It describes various parameters pertaining to this eclipse.

December 10, 1973 Lunar Eclipse Parameters
Parameter	Value
Penumbral Magnitude	1.07597
Umbral Magnitude	0.10069
Gamma	0.96441
Sun Right Ascension	17h07m12.8s
Sun Declination	-22°53'16.9"
Sun Semi-Diameter	16'14.5"
Sun Equatorial Horizontal Parallax	08.9"
Moon Right Ascension	05h07m14.5s
Moon Declination	+23°52'13.3"
Moon Semi-Diameter	16'39.2"
Moon Equatorial Horizontal Parallax	1°01'07.2"
ΔT	44.3 s

== Eclipse season ==
This eclipse is part of an eclipse season, a period, roughly every six months, when eclipses occur. Only two (or occasionally three) eclipse seasons occur each year, and each season lasts about 35 days and repeats just short of six months (173 days) later; thus two full eclipse seasons always occur each year. Either two or three eclipses happen each eclipse season. In the sequence below, each eclipse is separated by a fortnight.

Eclipse season of December 1973
December 10 Descending node (full moon)	December 24 Ascending node (new moon)
Partial lunar eclipse Lunar Saros 115	Annular solar eclipse Solar Saros 141

== Related eclipses ==
=== Eclipses in 1973 ===
- An annular solar eclipse on January 4.
- A penumbral lunar eclipse on January 18.
- A penumbral lunar eclipse on June 15.
- A total solar eclipse on June 30.
- A penumbral lunar eclipse on July 15.
- A partial lunar eclipse on December 10.
- An annular solar eclipse on December 24.

=== Metonic ===
- Preceded by: Lunar eclipse of February 21, 1970
- Followed by: Lunar eclipse of September 27, 1977

=== Tzolkinex ===
- Preceded by: Lunar eclipse of October 29, 1966
- Followed by: Lunar eclipse of January 20, 1981

=== Half-Saros ===
- Preceded by: Solar eclipse of December 4, 1964
- Followed by: Solar eclipse of December 15, 1982

=== Tritos ===
- Preceded by: Lunar eclipse of January 9, 1963
- Followed by: Lunar eclipse of November 8, 1984

=== Lunar Saros 115 ===
- Preceded by: Lunar eclipse of November 29, 1955
- Followed by: Lunar eclipse of December 21, 1991

=== Inex ===
- Preceded by: Lunar eclipse of December 29, 1944
- Followed by: Lunar eclipse of November 20, 2002

=== Triad ===
- Preceded by: Lunar eclipse of February 8, 1887
- Followed by: Lunar eclipse of October 9, 2060

=== Lunar eclipses of 1973–1976 ===
This eclipse is a member of a semester series. An eclipse in a semester series of lunar eclipses repeats approximately every 177 days and 4 hours (a semester) at alternating nodes of the Moon's orbit.

The penumbral lunar eclipses on January 18, 1973 and July 15, 1973 occur in the previous lunar year eclipse set.

Lunar eclipse series sets from 1973 to 1976
Ascending node				Descending node			
Saros	Date Viewing	Type Chart	Gamma	Saros	Date Viewing	Type Chart	Gamma
110	1973 Jun 15	Penumbral	−1.3217	115	1973 Dec 10	Partial	0.9644
120	1974 Jun 04	Partial	−0.5489	125	1974 Nov 29	Total	0.3054
130	1975 May 25	Total	0.2367	135	1975 Nov 18	Total	−0.4134
140	1976 May 13	Partial	0.9586	145	1976 Nov 06	Penumbral	−1.1276

=== Saros 115 ===
This eclipse is a part of Saros series 115, repeating every 18 years, 11 days, and containing 72 events. The series started with a penumbral lunar eclipse on April 21, 1000. It contains partial eclipses from July 6, 1126 through September 30, 1270; total eclipses from October 11, 1288 through July 20, 1739; and a second set of partial eclipses from July 30, 1757 through February 13, 2082. The series ends at member 72 as a penumbral eclipse on June 13, 2280.

The longest duration of totality was produced by member 36 at 99 minutes, 47 seconds on May 15, 1631. All eclipses in this series occur at the Moon’s descending node of orbit.

Greatest	First			
The greatest eclipse of the series occurred on 1631 May 15, lasting 99 minutes, 47 seconds.	Penumbral	Partial	Total	Central
The greatest eclipse of the series occurred on 1631 May 15, lasting 99 minutes, 47 seconds.	1000 Apr 21	1126 Jul 06	1288 Oct 11	1541 Mar 12
The greatest eclipse of the series occurred on 1631 May 15, lasting 99 minutes, 47 seconds.	Last			
The greatest eclipse of the series occurred on 1631 May 15, lasting 99 minutes, 47 seconds.	Central	Total	Partial	Penumbral
The greatest eclipse of the series occurred on 1631 May 15, lasting 99 minutes, 47 seconds.	1685 Jun 16	1739 Jul 20	2082 Feb 13	2280 Jun 13

Eclipses are tabulated in three columns; every third eclipse in the same column is one exeligmos apart, so they all cast shadows over approximately the same parts of the Earth.

Series members 46–67 occur between 1801 and 2200:
46	47	48
1811 Sep 02	1829 Sep 13	1847 Sep 24
49	50	51
1865 Oct 04	1883 Oct 16	1901 Oct 27
52	53	54
1919 Nov 07	1937 Nov 18	1955 Nov 29
55	56	57
1973 Dec 10	1991 Dec 21	2009 Dec 31
58	59	60
2028 Jan 12	2046 Jan 22	2064 Feb 02
61	62	63
2082 Feb 13	2100 Feb 24	2118 Mar 07
64	65	66
2136 Mar 18	2154 Mar 29	2172 Apr 09
67
2190 Apr 20

=== Tritos series ===
This eclipse is a part of a tritos cycle, repeating at alternating nodes every 135 synodic months (≈ 3986.63 days, or 11 years minus 1 month). Their appearance and longitude are irregular due to a lack of synchronization with the anomalistic month (period of perigee), but groupings of 3 tritos cycles (≈ 33 years minus 3 months) come close (≈ 434.044 anomalistic months), so eclipses are similar in these groupings.

Series members between 1801 and 2200
1810 Mar 21 (Saros 100)	1821 Feb 17 (Saros 101)	1832 Jan 17 (Saros 102)	1842 Dec 17 (Saros 103)	
1864 Oct 15 (Saros 105)	1875 Sep 15 (Saros 106)	1886 Aug 14 (Saros 107)	1897 Jul 14 (Saros 108)	1908 Jun 14 (Saros 109)
1919 May 15 (Saros 110)	1930 Apr 13 (Saros 111)	1941 Mar 13 (Saros 112)	1952 Feb 11 (Saros 113)	1963 Jan 09 (Saros 114)
1973 Dec 10 (Saros 115)	1984 Nov 08 (Saros 116)	1995 Oct 08 (Saros 117)	2006 Sep 07 (Saros 118)	2017 Aug 07 (Saros 119)
2028 Jul 06 (Saros 120)	2039 Jun 06 (Saros 121)	2050 May 06 (Saros 122)	2061 Apr 04 (Saros 123)	2072 Mar 04 (Saros 124)
2083 Feb 02 (Saros 125)	2094 Jan 01 (Saros 126)	2104 Dec 02 (Saros 127)	2115 Nov 02 (Saros 128)	2126 Oct 01 (Saros 129)
2137 Aug 30 (Saros 130)	2148 Jul 31 (Saros 131)	2159 Jun 30 (Saros 132)	2170 May 30 (Saros 133)	2181 Apr 29 (Saros 134)
2192 Mar 28 (Saros 135)

=== Inex series ===
This eclipse is a part of the long period inex cycle, repeating at alternating nodes, every 358 synodic months (≈ 10,571.95 days, or 29 years minus 20 days). Their appearance and longitude are irregular due to a lack of synchronization with the anomalistic month (period of perigee). However, groupings of 3 inex cycles (≈ 87 years minus 2 months) comes close (≈ 1,151.02 anomalistic months), so eclipses are similar in these groupings.

Series members between 1801 and 2200
1829 Mar 20 (Saros 110)	1858 Feb 27 (Saros 111)	1887 Feb 08 (Saros 112)
1916 Jan 20 (Saros 113)	1944 Dec 29 (Saros 114)	1973 Dec 10 (Saros 115)
2002 Nov 20 (Saros 116)	2031 Oct 30 (Saros 117)	2060 Oct 09 (Saros 118)
2089 Sep 19 (Saros 119)	2118 Aug 31 (Saros 120)	2147 Aug 11 (Saros 121)
2176 Jul 21 (Saros 122)

=== Half-Saros cycle ===
A lunar eclipse will be preceded and followed by solar eclipses by 9 years and 5.5 days (a half saros). This lunar eclipse is related to two partial solar eclipses of Solar Saros 122.

December 4, 1964	December 15, 1982

== See also ==
- List of lunar eclipses
- List of 20th-century lunar eclipses
