= December 2009 lunar eclipse =

- Partial eclipse
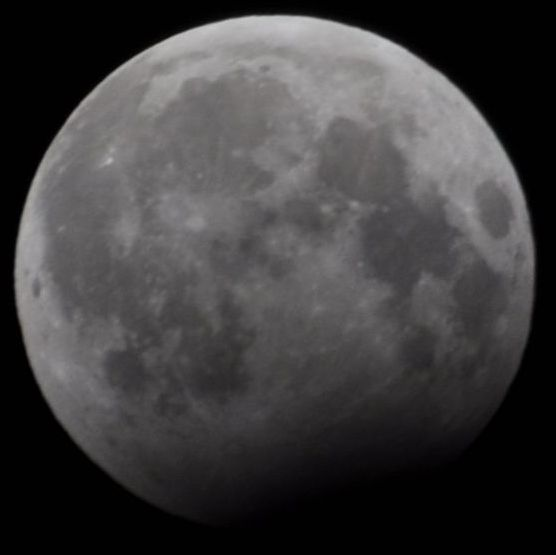
- Partiality as viewed from Munster, Ireland, 19:43 UTC
- Date: 31 December 2009
- Gamma: 0.9765
- Magnitude: 0.0779
- Saros cycle: 115 (57 of 72)
- Partiality: 59 minutes, 58 seconds
- Penumbral: 251 minutes, 3 seconds
Contacts (UTC)
- P1: 17:17:08
- U1: 18:52:43
- Greatest: 19:22:39
- U4: 19:52:41
- P4: 21:28:11

A partial lunar eclipse occurred at the Moon’s descending node of orbit on Thursday, 31 December 2009, with an umbral magnitude of 0.0779. A lunar eclipse occurs when the Moon moves into the Earth's shadow, causing the Moon to be darkened. A partial lunar eclipse occurs when one part of the Moon is in the Earth's umbra, while the other part is in the Earth's penumbra. Unlike a solar eclipse, which can only be viewed from a relatively small area of the world, a lunar eclipse may be viewed from anywhere on the night side of Earth. Occurring only about 20 hours before perigee (on 1 January 2010, at 15:30 UTC), the Moon's apparent diameter was larger.

This eclipse was the last of four lunar eclipses in 2009, with the others occurring on February 9 (penumbral), July 7 (penumbral), and August 6 (penumbral).

This lunar eclipse was also notable, because it occurred during a blue moon (a second full moon in December) and was near perigee (making it a supermoon). The next eclipse on New Year's Eve and blue moon will occur on 31 December 2028.

Only a small portion of the Moon entered the Earth's umbral shadow, but there was a distinct darkening visible over the Moon's southern surface at greatest eclipse.

== Visibility ==
The eclipse was completely visible over Europe, Asia, and much of Africa, seen rising over eastern North America and setting over Australia and the Pacific Ocean.

Hourly motion shown right to left	The Moon's hourly motion across the Earth's shadow in the constellation of Gemini.
Visibility map

== Images ==
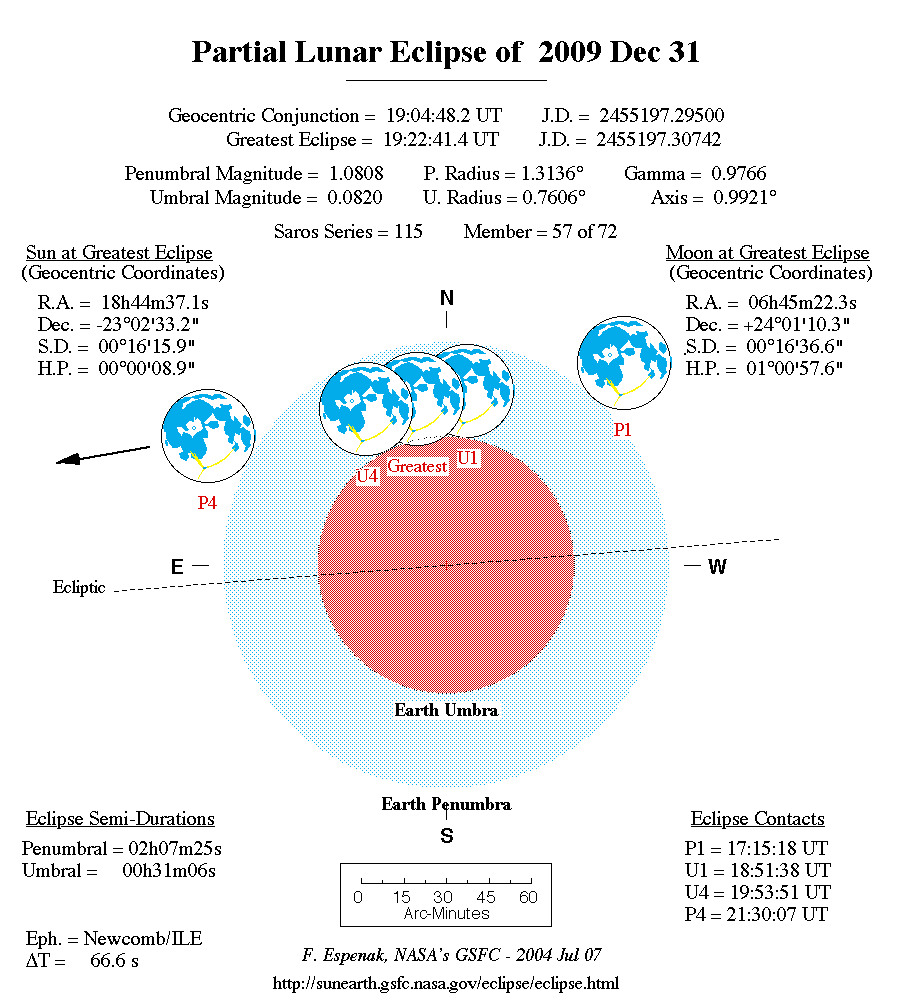
NASA chart of the eclipse

== Gallery ==
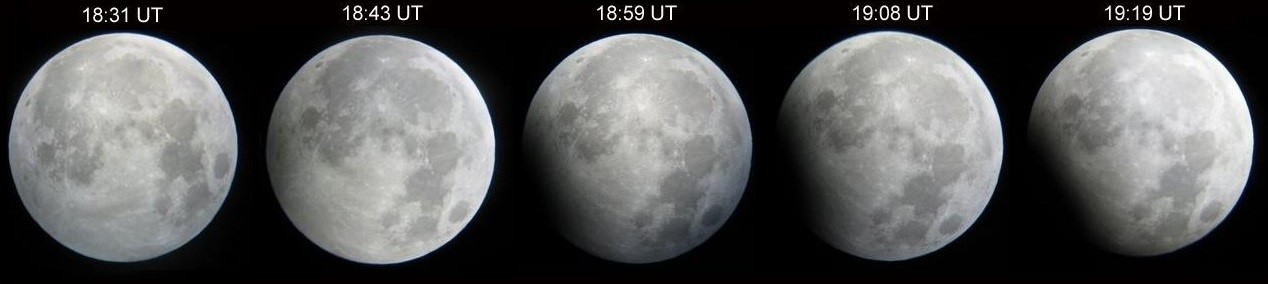
Progression from Degania A, Israel

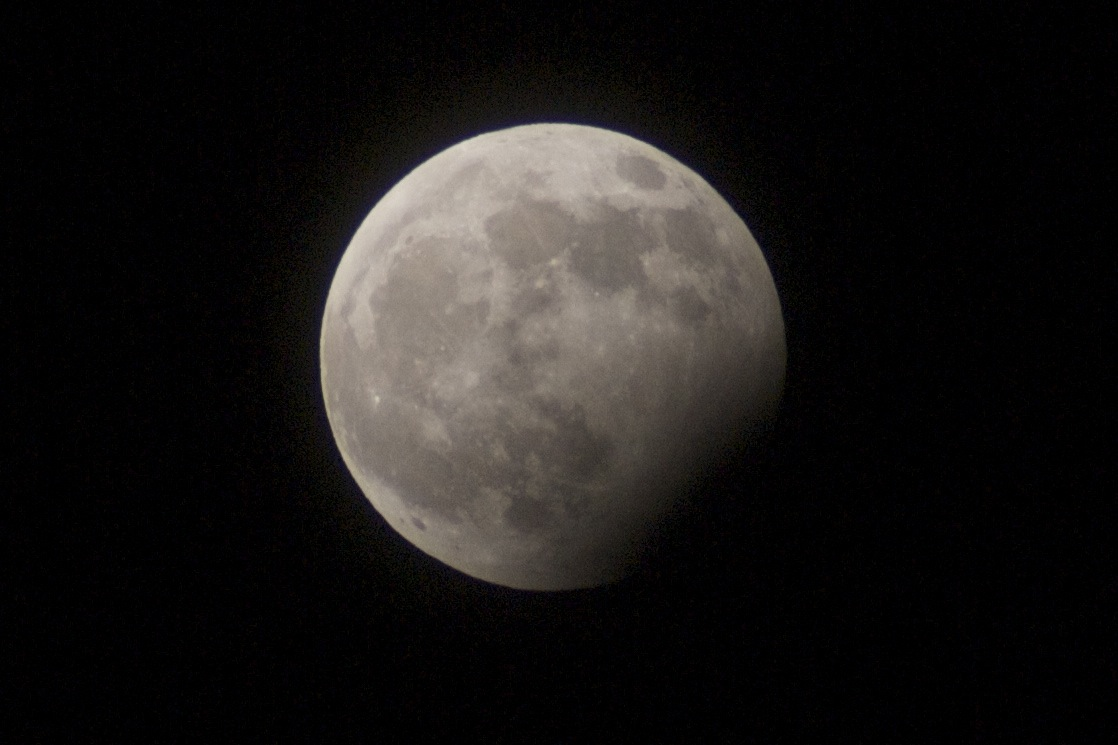
Sheffield, England, 19:14 UTC

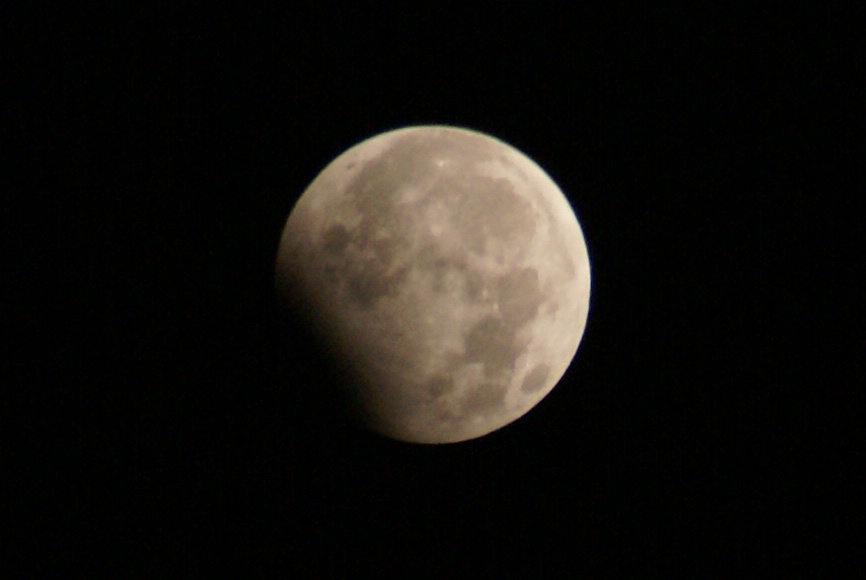
Qingdao, China, 19:16 UTC

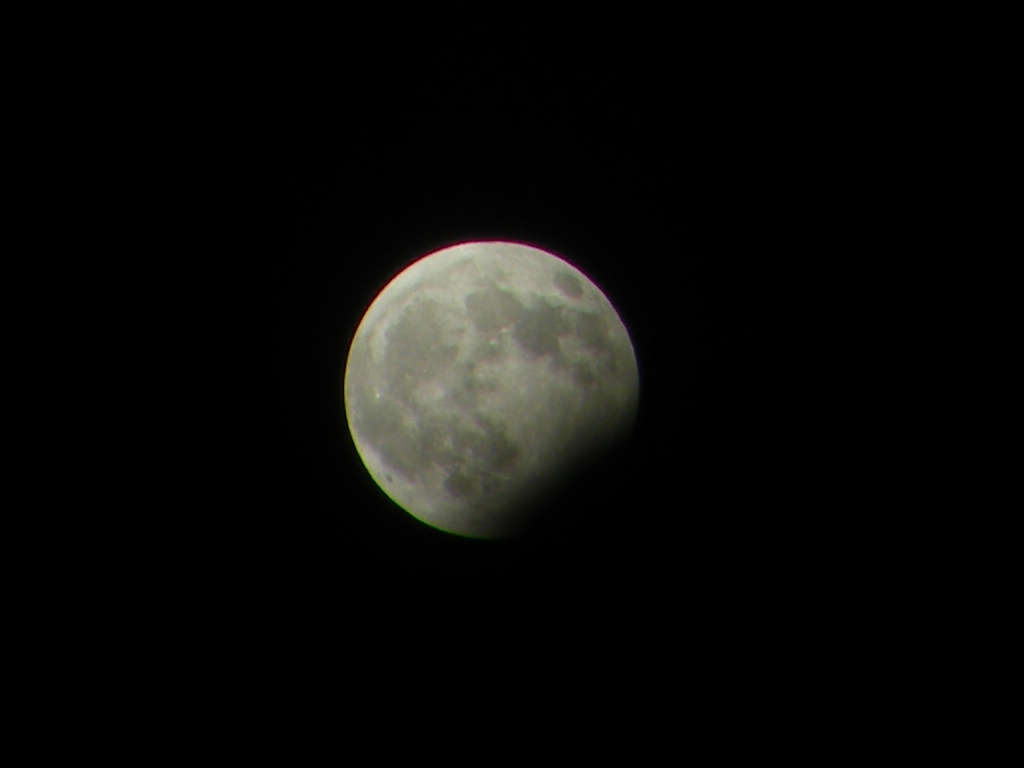
Laguja, Estonia, 19:21 UTC

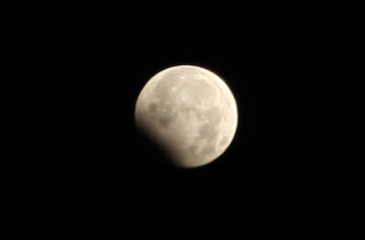
Beijing, China
At maximum, 19:22 UTC

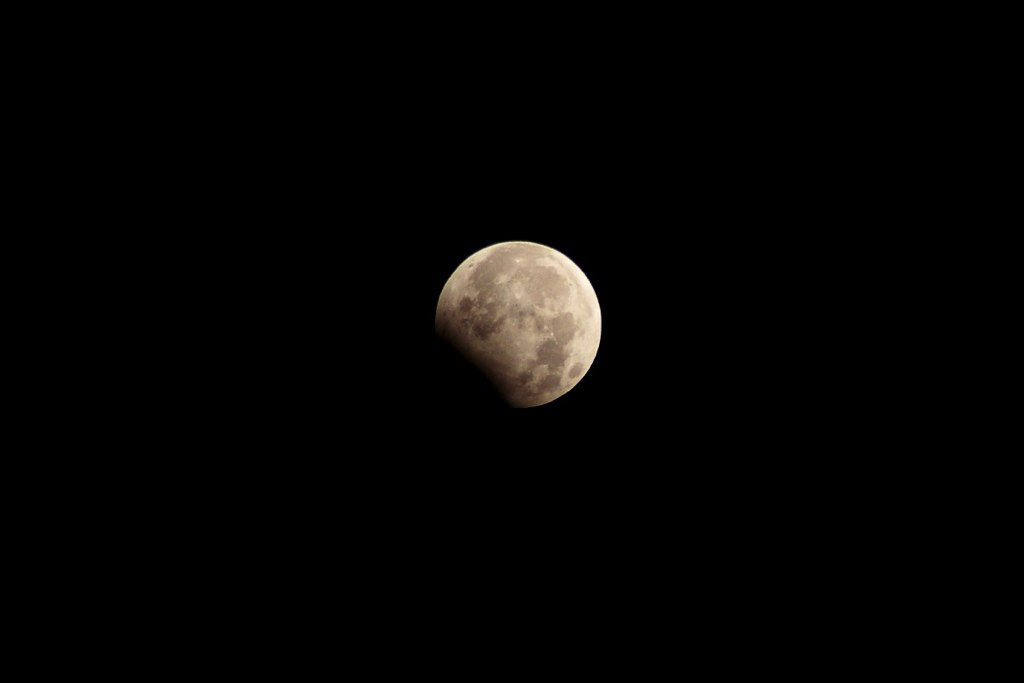
Tokyo, Japan, 19:32 UTC

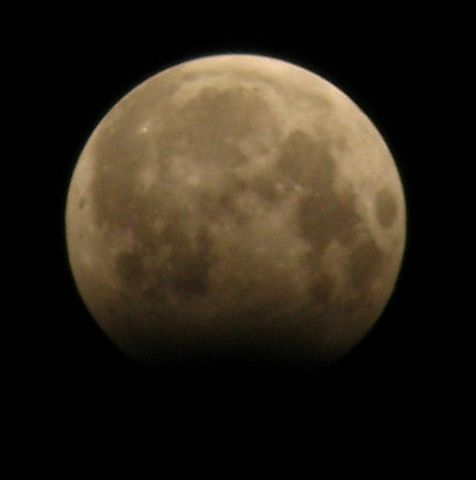
Chennai, India, 19:33 UTC

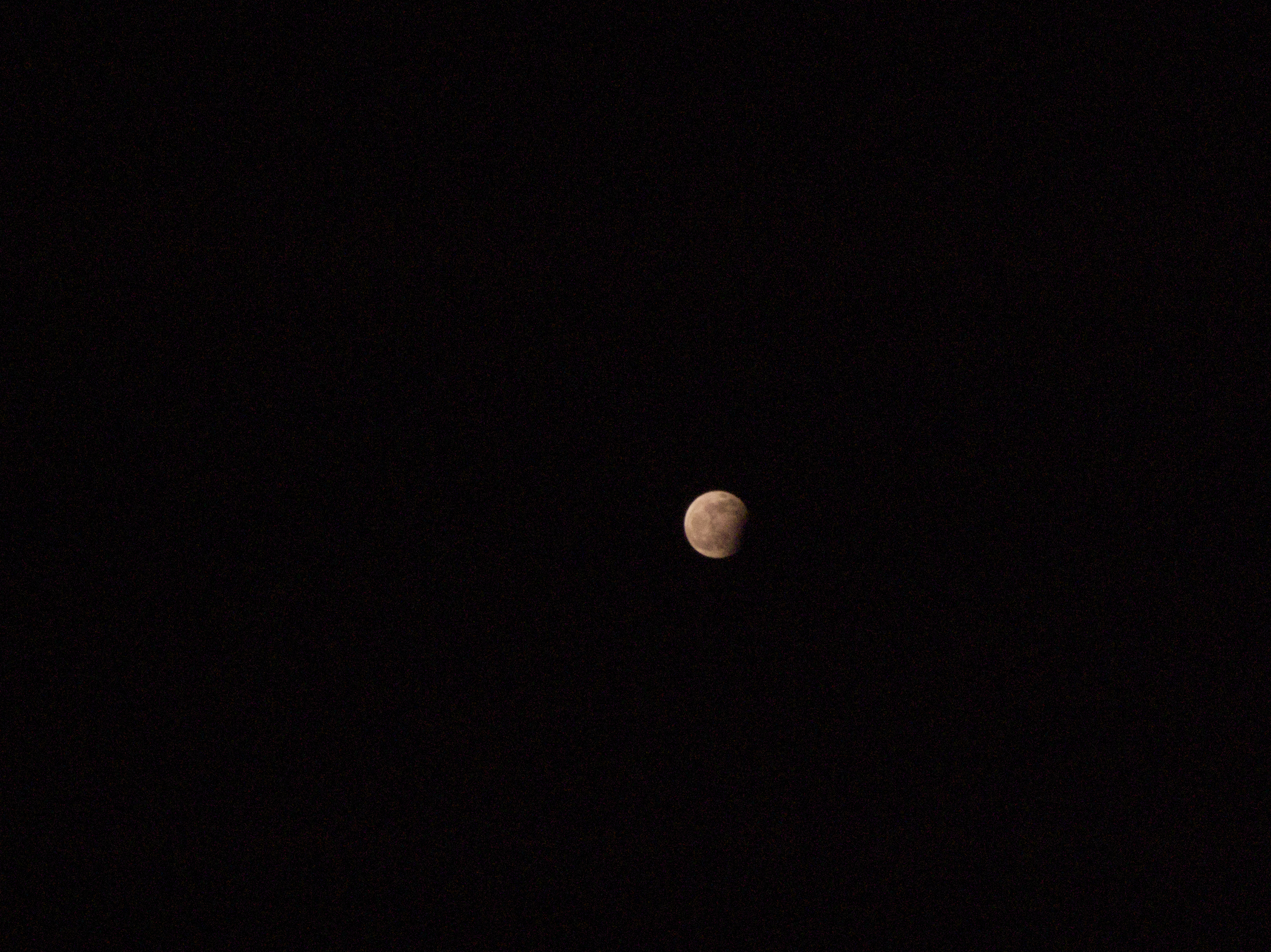
Barcelona, Spain, 19:34 UTC

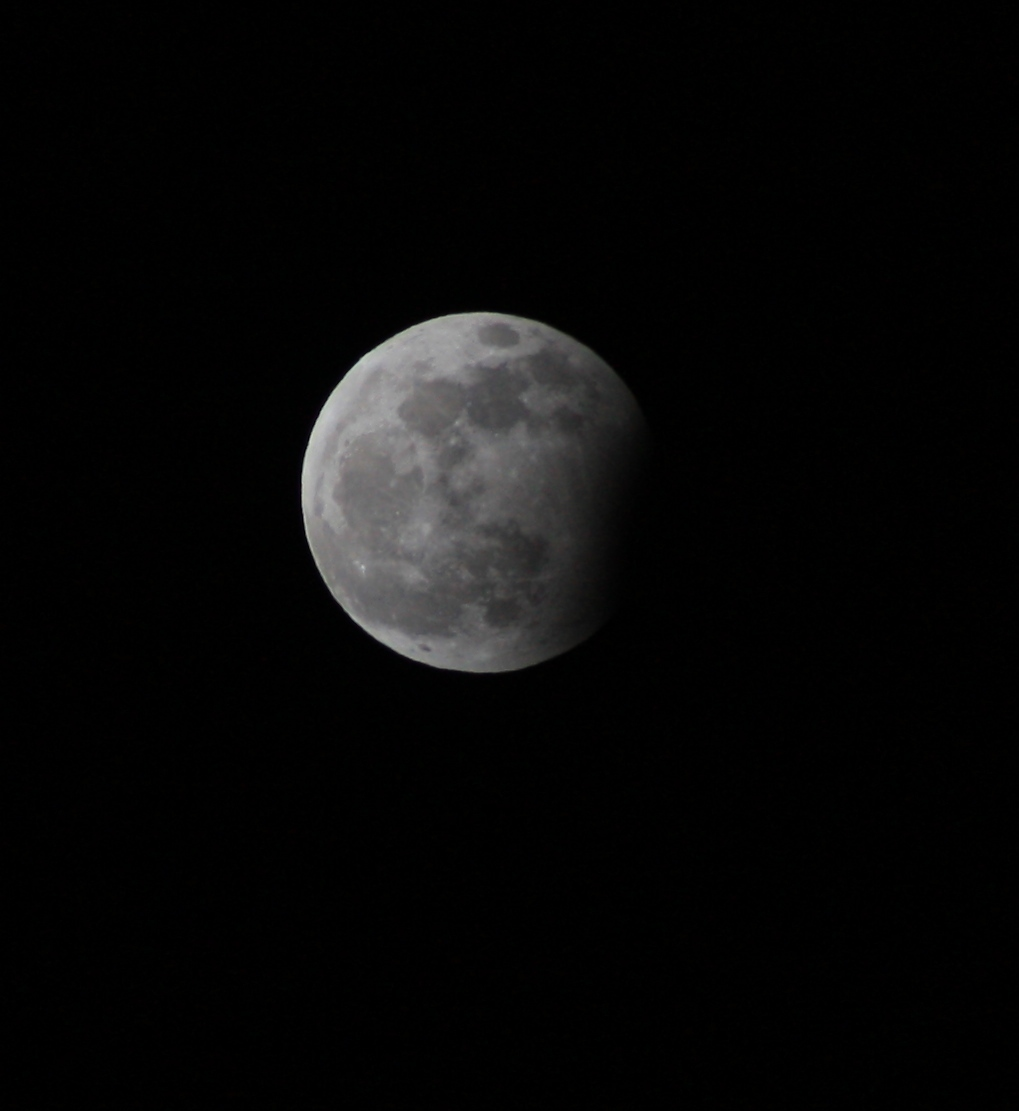
Athens, Greece, 19:34 UTC

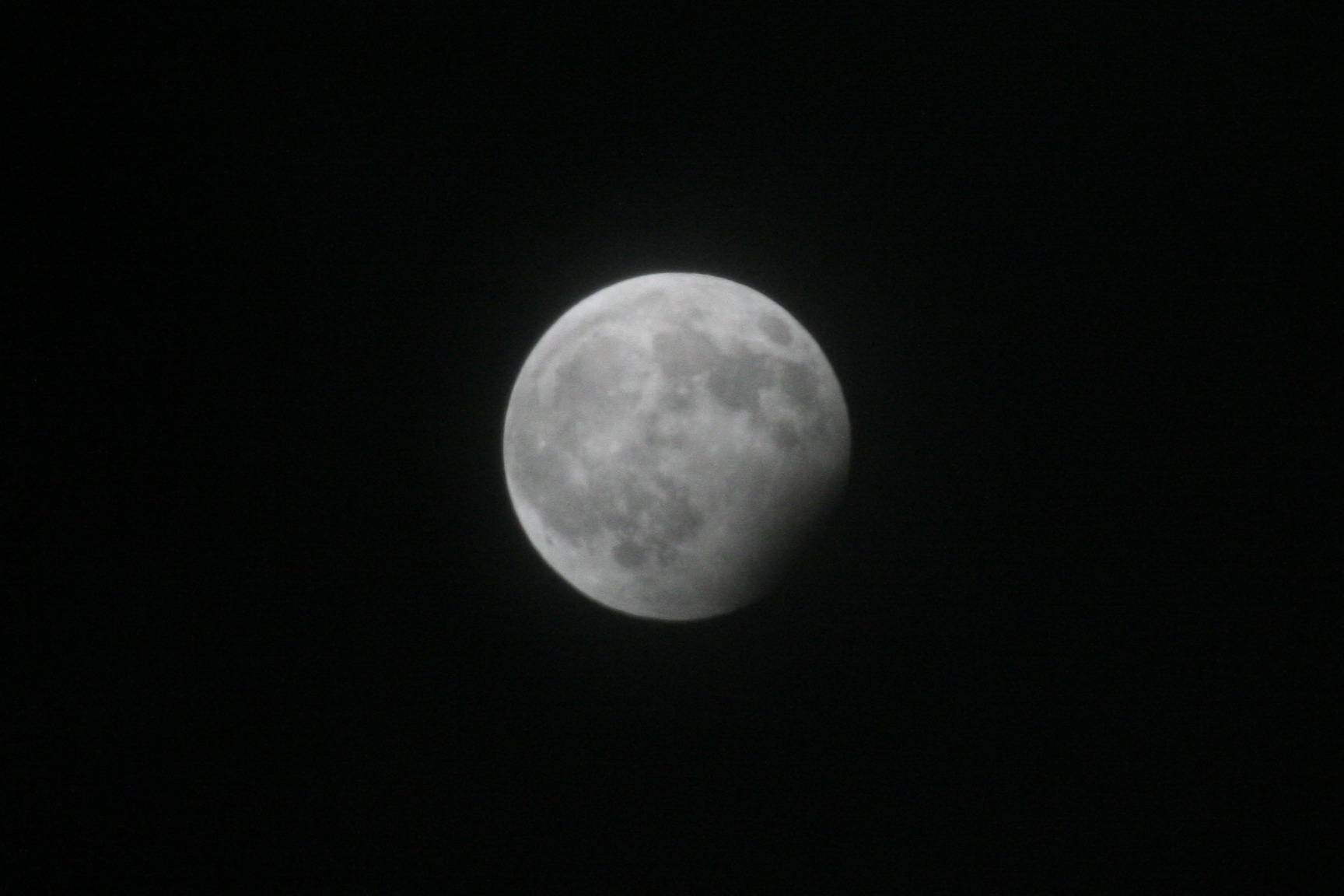
Helsinki, Finland, 19:47 UTC

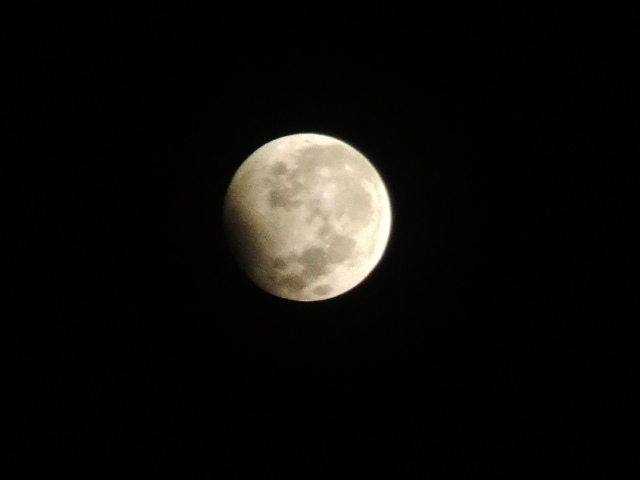
Nonthaburi, Thailand, 19:59 UTC

Belfort, France
Combined images

== Eclipse details ==
Shown below is a table displaying details about this particular solar eclipse. It describes various parameters pertaining to this eclipse.

31 December 2009 Lunar Eclipse Parameters
Parameter	Value
Penumbral Magnitude	1.05719
Umbral Magnitude	0.07793
Gamma	0.97660
Sun Right Ascension	18h44m37.2s
Sun Declination	-23°02'33.1"
Sun Semi-Diameter	16'15.9"
Sun Equatorial Horizontal Parallax	08.9"
Moon Right Ascension	06h45m22.4s
Moon Declination	+24°01'10.3"
Moon Semi-Diameter	16'36.6"
Moon Equatorial Horizontal Parallax	1°00'57.6"
ΔT	66.1 s

== Eclipse season ==
This eclipse is part of an eclipse season, a period, roughly every six months, when eclipses occur. Only two (or occasionally three) eclipse seasons occur each year, and each season lasts about 35 days and repeats just short of six months (173 days) later; thus two full eclipse seasons always occur each year. Either two or three eclipses happen each eclipse season. In the sequence below, each eclipse is separated by a fortnight.

Eclipse season of December 2009–January 2010
December 31 Descending node (full moon)	15 January Ascending node (new moon)
Partial lunar eclipse Lunar Saros 115	Annular solar eclipse Solar Saros 141

== Related eclipses ==
=== Eclipses in 2009 ===
- An annular solar eclipse on 26 January.
- A penumbral lunar eclipse on 9 February.
- A penumbral lunar eclipse on 7 July.
- A total solar eclipse on 22 July.
- A penumbral lunar eclipse on 6 August.
- A partial lunar eclipse on 31 December.

=== Metonic ===
- Preceded by: Lunar eclipse of 14 March 2006
- Followed by: Lunar eclipse of 18 October 2013

=== Tzolkinex ===
- Preceded by: Lunar eclipse of 20 November 2002
- Followed by: Lunar eclipse of 11 February 2017

=== Half-Saros ===
- Preceded by: Solar eclipse of 25 December 2000
- Followed by: Solar eclipse of 6 January 2019

=== Tritos ===
- Preceded by: Lunar eclipse of 31 January 1999
- Followed by: Lunar eclipse of 30 November 2020

=== Lunar Saros 115 ===
- Preceded by: Lunar eclipse of 21 December 1991
- Followed by: Lunar eclipse of 12 January 2028

=== Inex ===
- Preceded by: Lunar eclipse of 20 January 1981
- Followed by: Lunar eclipse of 11 December 2038

=== Triad ===
- Preceded by: Lunar eclipse of 3 March 1923
- Followed by: Lunar eclipse of 31 October 2096

=== Lunar eclipses of 2009–2013 ===
This eclipse is a member of a semester series. An eclipse in a semester series of lunar eclipses repeats approximately every 177 days and 4 hours (a semester) at alternating nodes of the Moon's orbit.

The penumbral lunar eclipses on February 9, 2009 and August 6, 2009 occur in the previous lunar year eclipse set, and the lunar eclipses on April 25, 2013 (partial) and October 18, 2013 (penumbral) occur in the next lunar year eclipse set.

Lunar eclipse series sets from 2009 to 2013
Ascending node				Descending node			
Saros	Date Viewing	Type Chart	Gamma	Saros	Date Viewing	Type Chart	Gamma
110	2009 Jul 07	Penumbral	−1.4916	115	2009 Dec 31	Partial	0.9766
120	2010 Jun 26	Partial	−0.7091	125	2010 Dec 21	Total	0.3214
130	2011 Jun 15	Total	0.0897	135	2011 Dec 10	Total	−0.3882
140	2012 Jun 04	Partial	0.8248	145	2012 Nov 28	Penumbral	−1.0869
150	2013 May 25	Penumbral	1.5351				

=== Saros 115 ===
This eclipse is a part of Saros series 115, repeating every 18 years, 11 days, and containing 72 events. The series started with a penumbral lunar eclipse on April 21, 1000. It contains partial eclipses from July 6, 1126 through September 30, 1270; total eclipses from October 11, 1288 through July 20, 1739; and a second set of partial eclipses from July 30, 1757 through February 13, 2082. The series ends at member 72 as a penumbral eclipse on June 13, 2280.

The longest duration of totality was produced by member 36 at 99 minutes, 47 seconds on May 15, 1631. All eclipses in this series occur at the Moon’s descending node of orbit.

Greatest	First			
The greatest eclipse of the series occurred on 1631 May 15, lasting 99 minutes, 47 seconds.	Penumbral	Partial	Total	Central
The greatest eclipse of the series occurred on 1631 May 15, lasting 99 minutes, 47 seconds.	1000 Apr 21	1126 Jul 06	1288 Oct 11	1541 Mar 12
The greatest eclipse of the series occurred on 1631 May 15, lasting 99 minutes, 47 seconds.	Last			
The greatest eclipse of the series occurred on 1631 May 15, lasting 99 minutes, 47 seconds.	Central	Total	Partial	Penumbral
The greatest eclipse of the series occurred on 1631 May 15, lasting 99 minutes, 47 seconds.	1685 Jun 16	1739 Jul 20	2082 Feb 13	2280 Jun 13

Eclipses are tabulated in three columns; every third eclipse in the same column is one exeligmos apart, so they all cast shadows over approximately the same parts of the Earth.

Series members 46–67 occur between 1801 and 2200:
46	47	48
1811 Sep 02	1829 Sep 13	1847 Sep 24
49	50	51
1865 Oct 04	1883 Oct 16	1901 Oct 27
52	53	54
1919 Nov 07	1937 Nov 18	1955 Nov 29
55	56	57
1973 Dec 10	1991 Dec 21	2009 Dec 31
58	59	60
2028 Jan 12	2046 Jan 22	2064 Feb 02
61	62	63
2082 Feb 13	2100 Feb 24	2118 Mar 07
64	65	66
2136 Mar 18	2154 Mar 29	2172 Apr 09
67
2190 Apr 20

=== Tritos series ===
This eclipse is a part of a tritos cycle, repeating at alternating nodes every 135 synodic months (≈ 3986.63 days, or 11 years minus 1 month). Their appearance and longitude are irregular due to a lack of synchronization with the anomalistic month (period of perigee), but groupings of 3 tritos cycles (≈ 33 years minus 3 months) come close (≈ 434.044 anomalistic months), so eclipses are similar in these groupings.

Series members between 1835 and 2200
1835 May 12 (Saros 99)	1846 Apr 11 (Saros 100)		1868 Feb 08 (Saros 102)	1879 Jan 08 (Saros 103)
				1933 Aug 05 (Saros 108)
1944 Jul 06 (Saros 109)	1955 Jun 05 (Saros 110)	1966 May 04 (Saros 111)	1977 Apr 04 (Saros 112)	1988 Mar 03 (Saros 113)
1999 Jan 31 (Saros 114)	2009 Dec 31 (Saros 115)	2020 Nov 30 (Saros 116)	2031 Oct 30 (Saros 117)	2042 Sep 29 (Saros 118)
2053 Aug 29 (Saros 119)	2064 Jul 28 (Saros 120)	2075 Jun 28 (Saros 121)	2086 May 28 (Saros 122)	2097 Apr 26 (Saros 123)
2108 Mar 27 (Saros 124)	2119 Feb 25 (Saros 125)	2130 Jan 24 (Saros 126)	2140 Dec 23 (Saros 127)	2151 Nov 24 (Saros 128)
2162 Oct 23 (Saros 129)	2173 Sep 21 (Saros 130)	2184 Aug 21 (Saros 131)	2195 Jul 22 (Saros 132)	

=== Inex series ===
This eclipse is a part of the long period inex cycle, repeating at alternating nodes, every 358 synodic months (≈ 10,571.95 days, or 29 years minus 20 days). Their appearance and longitude are irregular due to a lack of synchronization with the anomalistic month (period of perigee). However, groupings of 3 inex cycles (≈ 87 years minus 2 months) comes close (≈ 1,151.02 anomalistic months), so eclipses are similar in these groupings.

Series members between 1801 and 2200
1807 May 21 (Saros 108)	1836 May 01 (Saros 109)	1865 Apr 11 (Saros 110)
1894 Mar 21 (Saros 111)	1923 Mar 03 (Saros 112)	1952 Feb 11 (Saros 113)
1981 Jan 20 (Saros 114)	2009 Dec 31 (Saros 115)	2038 Dec 11 (Saros 116)
2067 Nov 21 (Saros 117)	2096 Oct 31 (Saros 118)	2125 Oct 12 (Saros 119)
2154 Sep 21 (Saros 120)	2183 Sep 02 (Saros 121)	

=== Half-Saros cycle ===
A lunar eclipse will be preceded and followed by solar eclipses by 9 years and 5.5 days (a half saros). This lunar eclipse is related to two partial solar eclipses of Solar Saros 122.

25 December 2000	6 January 2019

== See also ==
- List of lunar eclipses
- List of 21st-century lunar eclipses
- File:2009-12-31 Lunar Eclipse Sketch.gif Chart
