= November 1955 lunar eclipse =

Partial lunar eclipse November 29, 1955

- Partial eclipse
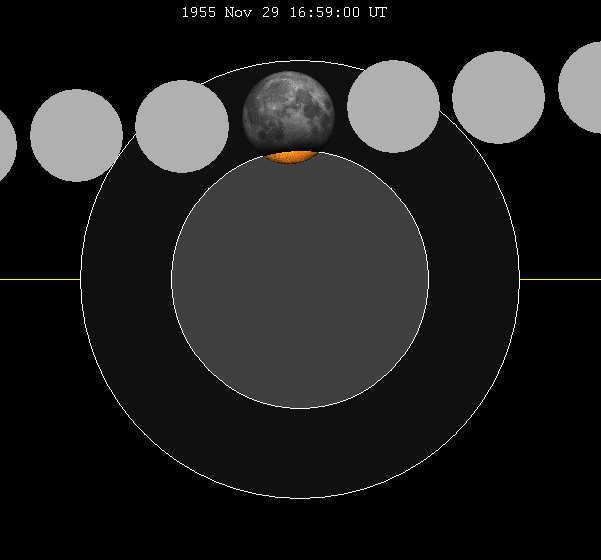
- The Moon's hourly motion shown right to left
- Date: November 29, 1955
- Gamma: 0.9551
- Magnitude: 0.1190
- Saros cycle: 115 (54 of 72)
- Partiality: 74 minutes, 10 seconds
- Penumbral: 253 minutes, 0 seconds
Contacts (UTC)
- P1: 14:52:59
- U1: 16:22:25
- Greatest: 16:59:28
- U4: 17:36:35
- P4: 19:05:59

A partial lunar eclipse occurred at the Moon’s descending node of orbit on Tuesday, November 29, 1955, with an umbral magnitude of 0.1190. A lunar eclipse occurs when the Moon moves into the Earth's shadow, causing the Moon to be darkened. A partial lunar eclipse occurs when one part of the Moon is in the Earth's umbra, while the other part is in the Earth's penumbra. Unlike a solar eclipse, which can only be viewed from a relatively small area of the world, a lunar eclipse may be viewed from anywhere on the night side of Earth. Occurring only about 18.5 hours before perigee (on November 30, 1955, at 11:25 UTC), the Moon's apparent diameter was larger.

== Visibility ==
The eclipse was completely visible over eastern Europe, Asia, and Australia, seen rising over Africa and western Europe and setting over the central Pacific Ocean and northwestern North America.

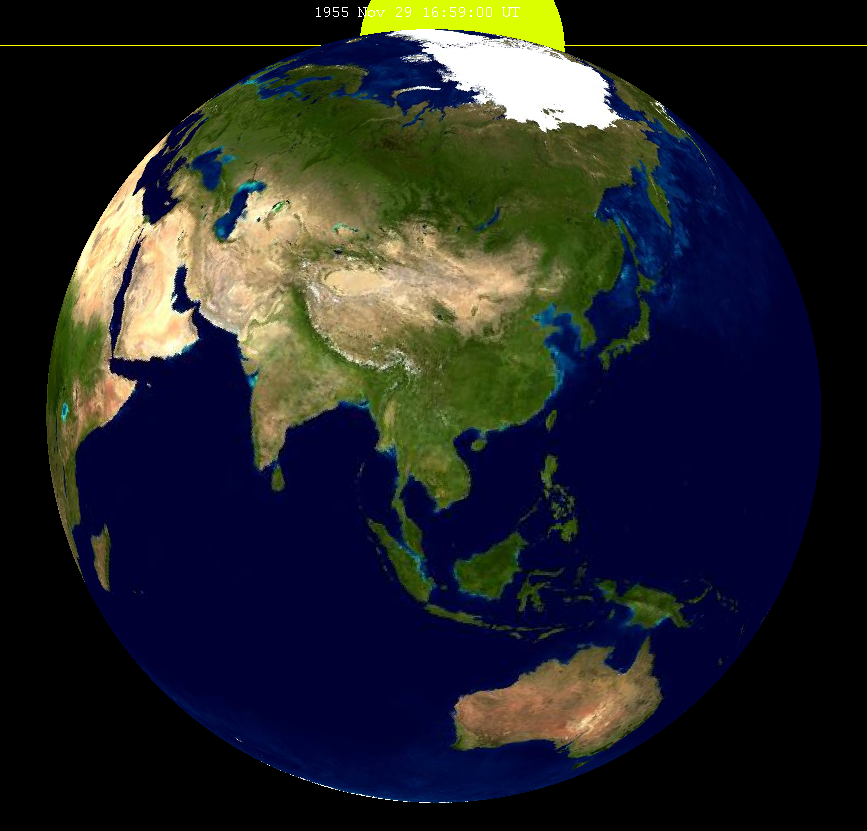
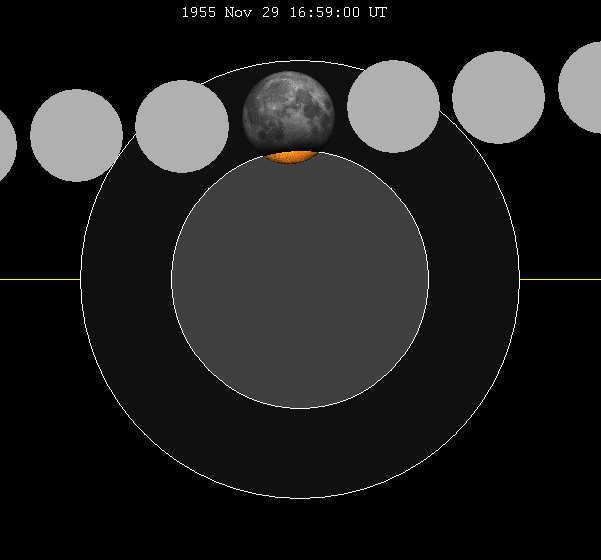

== Eclipse details ==
Shown below is a table displaying details about this particular lunar eclipse. It describes various parameters pertaining to this eclipse.

November 29, 1955 Lunar Eclipse Parameters
Parameter	Value
Penumbral Magnitude	1.09167
Umbral Magnitude	0.11899
Gamma	0.95514
Sun Right Ascension	16h19m25.1s
Sun Declination	-21°25'59.1"
Sun Semi-Diameter	16'13.0"
Sun Equatorial Horizontal Parallax	08.9"
Moon Right Ascension	04h19m06.8s
Moon Declination	+22°24'16.1"
Moon Semi-Diameter	16'40.3"
Moon Equatorial Horizontal Parallax	1°01'11.3"
ΔT	31.4 s

== Eclipse season ==
This eclipse is part of an eclipse season, a period, roughly every six months, when eclipses occur. Only two (or occasionally three) eclipse seasons occur each year, and each season lasts about 35 days and repeats just short of six months (173 days) later; thus two full eclipse seasons always occur each year. Either two or three eclipses happen each eclipse season. In the sequence below, each eclipse is separated by a fortnight.

Eclipse season of November–December 1955
November 29 Descending node (full moon)	December 14 Ascending node (new moon)
Partial lunar eclipse Lunar Saros 115	Annular solar eclipse Solar Saros 141

== Related eclipses ==
=== Eclipses in 1955 ===
- A penumbral lunar eclipse on January 8.
- A penumbral lunar eclipse on June 5.
- A total solar eclipse on June 20.
- A partial lunar eclipse on November 29.
- An annular solar eclipse on December 14.

=== Metonic ===
- Preceded by: Lunar eclipse of February 11, 1952
- Followed by: Lunar eclipse of September 17, 1959

=== Tzolkinex ===
- Preceded by: Lunar eclipse of October 18, 1948
- Followed by: Lunar eclipse of January 9, 1963

=== Half-Saros ===
- Preceded by: Solar eclipse of November 23, 1946
- Followed by: Solar eclipse of December 4, 1964

=== Tritos ===
- Preceded by: Lunar eclipse of December 29, 1944
- Followed by: Lunar eclipse of October 29, 1966

=== Lunar Saros 115 ===
- Preceded by: Lunar eclipse of November 18, 1937
- Followed by: Lunar eclipse of December 10, 1973

=== Inex ===
- Preceded by: Lunar eclipse of December 19, 1926
- Followed by: Lunar eclipse of November 8, 1984

=== Triad ===
- Preceded by: Lunar eclipse of January 28, 1869
- Followed by: Lunar eclipse of September 29, 2042

=== Lunar eclipses of 1955–1958 ===
This eclipse is a member of a semester series. An eclipse in a semester series of lunar eclipses repeats approximately every 177 days and 4 hours (a semester) at alternating nodes of the Moon's orbit.

The penumbral lunar eclipse on January 8, 1955 occurs in the previous lunar year eclipse set, and the penumbral lunar eclipse on April 4, 1958 occurs in the next lunar year eclipse set.

Lunar eclipse series sets from 1955 to 1958
Ascending node				Descending node			
Saros	Date Viewing	Type Chart	Gamma	Saros	Date Viewing	Type Chart	Gamma
110	1955 Jun 05	Penumbral	−1.2384	115	1955 Nov 29	Partial	0.9551
120	1956 May 24	Partial	−0.4726	125	1956 Nov 18	Total	0.2917
130	1957 May 13	Total	0.3046	135	1957 Nov 07	Total	−0.4332
140	1958 May 03	Partial	1.0188	145	1958 Oct 27	Penumbral	−1.1571

=== Saros 115 ===
This eclipse is a part of Saros series 115, repeating every 18 years, 11 days, and containing 72 events. The series started with a penumbral lunar eclipse on April 21, 1000. It contains partial eclipses from July 6, 1126 through September 30, 1270; total eclipses from October 11, 1288 through July 20, 1739; and a second set of partial eclipses from July 30, 1757 through February 13, 2082. The series ends at member 72 as a penumbral eclipse on June 13, 2280.

The longest duration of totality was produced by member 36 at 99 minutes, 47 seconds on May 15, 1631. All eclipses in this series occur at the Moon’s descending node of orbit.

Greatest	First			
The greatest eclipse of the series occurred on 1631 May 15, lasting 99 minutes, 47 seconds.	Penumbral	Partial	Total	Central
The greatest eclipse of the series occurred on 1631 May 15, lasting 99 minutes, 47 seconds.	1000 Apr 21	1126 Jul 06	1288 Oct 11	1541 Mar 12
The greatest eclipse of the series occurred on 1631 May 15, lasting 99 minutes, 47 seconds.	Last			
The greatest eclipse of the series occurred on 1631 May 15, lasting 99 minutes, 47 seconds.	Central	Total	Partial	Penumbral
The greatest eclipse of the series occurred on 1631 May 15, lasting 99 minutes, 47 seconds.	1685 Jun 16	1739 Jul 20	2082 Feb 13	2280 Jun 13

Eclipses are tabulated in three columns; every third eclipse in the same column is one exeligmos apart, so they all cast shadows over approximately the same parts of the Earth.

Series members 46–67 occur between 1801 and 2200:
46	47	48
1811 Sep 02	1829 Sep 13	1847 Sep 24
49	50	51
1865 Oct 04	1883 Oct 16	1901 Oct 27
52	53	54
1919 Nov 07	1937 Nov 18	1955 Nov 29
55	56	57
1973 Dec 10	1991 Dec 21	2009 Dec 31
58	59	60
2028 Jan 12	2046 Jan 22	2064 Feb 02
61	62	63
2082 Feb 13	2100 Feb 24	2118 Mar 07
64	65	66
2136 Mar 18	2154 Mar 29	2172 Apr 09
67
2190 Apr 20

=== Tritos series ===
This eclipse is a part of a tritos cycle, repeating at alternating nodes every 135 synodic months (≈ 3986.63 days, or 11 years minus 1 month). Their appearance and longitude are irregular due to a lack of synchronization with the anomalistic month (period of perigee), but groupings of 3 tritos cycles (≈ 33 years minus 3 months) come close (≈ 434.044 anomalistic months), so eclipses are similar in these groupings.

Series members between 1801 and 2200
1803 Feb 06 (Saros 101)	1814 Jan 06 (Saros 102)	1824 Dec 06 (Saros 103)		1846 Oct 04 (Saros 105)
1857 Sep 04 (Saros 106)	1868 Aug 03 (Saros 107)	1879 Jul 03 (Saros 108)	1890 Jun 03 (Saros 109)	1901 May 03 (Saros 110)
1912 Apr 01 (Saros 111)	1923 Mar 03 (Saros 112)	1934 Jan 30 (Saros 113)	1944 Dec 29 (Saros 114)	1955 Nov 29 (Saros 115)
1966 Oct 29 (Saros 116)	1977 Sep 27 (Saros 117)	1988 Aug 27 (Saros 118)	1999 Jul 28 (Saros 119)	2010 Jun 26 (Saros 120)
2021 May 26 (Saros 121)	2032 Apr 25 (Saros 122)	2043 Mar 25 (Saros 123)	2054 Feb 22 (Saros 124)	2065 Jan 22 (Saros 125)
2075 Dec 22 (Saros 126)	2086 Nov 20 (Saros 127)	2097 Oct 21 (Saros 128)	2108 Sep 20 (Saros 129)	2119 Aug 20 (Saros 130)
2130 Jul 21 (Saros 131)	2141 Jun 19 (Saros 132)	2152 May 18 (Saros 133)	2163 Apr 19 (Saros 134)	2174 Mar 18 (Saros 135)
2185 Feb 14 (Saros 136)	2196 Jan 15 (Saros 137)			

=== Inex series ===
This eclipse is a part of the long period inex cycle, repeating at alternating nodes, every 358 synodic months (≈ 10,571.95 days, or 29 years minus 20 days). Their appearance and longitude are irregular due to a lack of synchronization with the anomalistic month (period of perigee). However, groupings of 3 inex cycles (≈ 87 years minus 2 months) comes close (≈ 1,151.02 anomalistic months), so eclipses are similar in these groupings.

Series members between 1801 and 2200
1811 Mar 10 (Saros 110)	1840 Feb 17 (Saros 111)	1869 Jan 28 (Saros 112)
1898 Jan 08 (Saros 113)	1926 Dec 19 (Saros 114)	1955 Nov 29 (Saros 115)
1984 Nov 08 (Saros 116)	2013 Oct 18 (Saros 117)	2042 Sep 29 (Saros 118)
2071 Sep 09 (Saros 119)	2100 Aug 19 (Saros 120)	2129 Jul 31 (Saros 121)
2158 Jul 11 (Saros 122)	2187 Jun 20 (Saros 123)	

=== Half-Saros cycle ===
A lunar eclipse will be preceded and followed by solar eclipses by 9 years and 5.5 days (a half saros). This lunar eclipse is related to two partial solar eclipses of Solar Saros 122.

November 23, 1946	December 4, 1964

== See also ==
- List of lunar eclipses
- List of 20th-century lunar eclipses
