= Lunar Saros 115 =

Eclipse cycle of the moon

Member 57
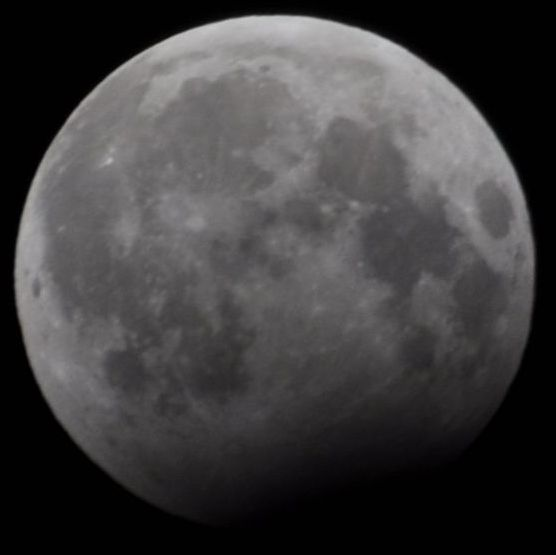
2009 Dec 31

Saros cycle series 115 for lunar eclipses occurs at the moon's descending node, repeats every 18 years 11 and 1/3 days. It contains 72 events.

This lunar saros is linked to Solar Saros 122.

== List ==
Cat.	Saros	Mem	Date	Time UT (hr:mn)	Type	Gamma	Magnitude	Duration (min)			Contacts UT (hr:mn)						Chart	QSE
Cat.	Saros	Mem	Date	Greatest	Type	Gamma	Magnitude	Pen.	Par.	Tot.	P1	P4	U1	U2	U3	U4	Chart	QSE
07217	115	1	1000 Apr 21	10:47:39	Penumbral	-1.5354	-0.9847	77.8			10:08:45	11:26:33						t-
07261	115	2	1018 May 2	17:36:53	Penumbral	-1.4601	-0.8441	133.4			16:30:11	18:43:35						t-
07305	115	3	1036 May 13	0:23:32	Penumbral	-1.3814	-0.6974	171.1			22:57:59	1:49:05						t-
07350	115	4	1054 May 24	7:06:50	Penumbral	-1.2989	-0.5438	201.2			5:26:14	8:47:26						t-
07394	115	5	1072 Jun 03	13:50:39	Penumbral	-1.2156	-0.3891	225.7			11:57:48	15:43:30						t-
07439	115	6	1090 Jun 14	20:34:35	Penumbral	-1.1311	-0.2323	246.3			18:31:26	22:37:44						t-
07485	115	7	1108 Jun 25	3:20:28	Penumbral	-1.0469	-0.0762	263.7			1:08:37	5:32:19						t-
07531	115	8	1126 Jul 6	10:10:16	Partial	-0.9647	0.0757	278.1	64.4		7:51:13	12:29:19	9:38:04			10:42:28		t-
07577	115	9	1144 Jul 16	17:05:15	Partial	-0.8858	0.2217	290	107.6		14:40:15	19:30:15	16:11:27			17:59:03		h-
07624	115	10	1162 Jul 28	0:06:36	Partial	-0.8107	0.3602	299.7	134		21:36:45	2:36:27	22:59:36			1:13:36		h-
07671	115	11	1180 Aug 7	7:15:04	Partial	-0.7403	0.4899	307.6	152.7		4:41:16	9:48:52	5:58:43			8:31:25		h-
07717	115	12	1198 Aug 18	14:32:52	Partial	-0.6764	0.6075	313.7	166.3		11:56:01	17:09:43	13:09:43			15:56:01		a-
07763	115	13	1216 Aug 28	21:59:36	Partial	-0.6191	0.7130	318.4	176.5		19:20:24	0:38:48	20:31:21			23:27:51		a-
07809	115	14	1234 Sep 09	5:35:20	Partial	-0.5682	0.8064	321.9	184.1		2:54:23	8:16:17	4:03:17			7:07:23		a-
07854	115	15	1252 Sep 19	13:21:02	Partial	-0.5247	0.8863	324.5	189.7		10:38:47	16:03:17	11:46:11			14:55:53		a-
07898	115	16	1270 Sep 30	21:16:50	Partial	-0.4886	0.9527	326.1	193.7		18:33:47	23:59:53	19:39:59			22:53:41		a-
07943	115	17	1288 Oct 11	5:22:09	Total	-0.4598	1.0056	327.1	196.5	11.6	2:38:36	8:05:42	3:43:54	5:16:21	5:27:57	7:00:24		a-
07989	115	18	1306 Oct 22	13:35:34	Total	-0.4369	1.0478	327.6	198.4	33.4	10:51:46	16:19:22	11:56:22	13:18:52	13:52:16	15:14:46		a-
08032	115	19	1324 Nov 01	21:57:32	Total	-0.4205	1.0783	327.6	199.5	42.3	19:13:44	0:41:20	20:17:47	21:36:23	22:18:41	23:37:17		a-
08074	115	20	1342 Nov 13	6:26:34	Total	-0.4091	1.0997	327.2	200.1	47.3	3:42:58	9:10:10	4:46:31	6:02:55	6:50:13	8:06:37		a-
08116	115	21	1360 Nov 23	15:00:39	Total	-0.4013	1.1148	326.6	200.4	50.4	12:17:21	17:43:57	13:20:27	14:35:27	15:25:51	16:40:51		a-
08157	115	22	1378 Dec 04	23:38:54	Total	-0.3963	1.1249	325.8	200.4	52.2	20:56:00	2:21:48	21:58:42	23:12:48	0:05:00	1:19:06		a-
08198	115	23	1396 Dec 15	8:19:17	Total	-0.3923	1.1335	324.9	200.3	53.7	5:36:50	11:01:44	6:39:08	7:52:26	8:46:08	9:59:26		a-
08239	115	24	1414 Dec 26	17:01:07	Total	-0.3889	1.1411	324.0	200.2	55.0	14:19:07	19:43:07	15:21:01	16:33:37	17:28:37	18:41:13		a-
08281	115	25	1433 Jan 06	1:40:46	Total	-0.3829	1.1538	323.1	200.3	57.1	22:59:13	4:22:19	0:00:37	1:12:13	2:09:19	3:20:55		p-
08322	115	26	1451 Jan 17	10:19:23	Total	-0.3754	1.1695	322.3	200.6	59.5	7:38:14	13:00:32	8:39:05	9:49:38	10:49:08	11:59:41		p-
08363	115	27	1469 Jan 27	18:53:18	Total	-0.3632	1.1940	321.8	201.3	63.1	16:12:24	21:34:12	17:12:39	18:21:45	19:24:51	20:33:57		p-
08403	115	28	1487 Feb 08	3:22:49	Total	-0.3469	1.2262	321.3	202.3	67.3	0:42:10	6:03:28	1:41:40	2:49:10	3:56:28	5:03:58		p-
08443	115	29	1505 Feb 18	11:45:03	Total	-0.3240	1.2708	321.2	203.7	72.4	9:04:27	14:25:39	10:03:12	11:08:51	12:21:15	13:26:54		p-
08484	115	30	1523 Mar 01	20:02:00	Total	-0.2961	1.3244	321.2	205.3	77.7	17:21:24	22:42:36	18:19:21	19:23:09	20:40:51	21:44:39		p-
08525	115	31	1541 Mar 12	4:11:19	Total	-0.2612	1.3912	321.3	207.1	83.3	1:30:40	6:51:58	2:27:46	3:29:40	4:52:58	5:54:52		p-
08568	115	32	1559 Mar 23	12:13:18	Total	-0.2197	1.4698	321.5	209.0	88.5	9:32:33	14:54:03	10:28:48	11:29:03	12:57:33	13:57:48		p-
08611	115	33	1577 Apr 02	20:08:13	Total	-0.1719	1.5598	321.7	210.7	93.1	17:27:22	22:49:04	18:22:52	19:21:40	20:54:46	21:53:34		p-
08654	115	34	1595 Apr 24	3:56:44	Total	-0.1184	1.6602	321.7	212.0	96.7	1:15:53	6:37:35	2:10:44	3:08:23	4:45:05	5:42:44		p-
08698	115	35	1613 May 4	11:39:03	Total	-0.0593	1.7709	321.4	212.8	99.0	8:58:21	14:19:45	9:52:39	10:49:33	12:28:33	13:25:27		pp
08742	115	36	1631 May 15	19:15:41	Total	0.0052	1.8721	320.7	213.0	99.8	16:35:20	21:56:02	17:29:11	18:25:47	20:05:35	21:02:11		pp
08786	115	37	1649 May 26	2:48:36	Total	0.0732	1.7489	319.6	212.2	98.6	0:08:48	5:28:24	1:02:30	1:59:18	3:37:54	4:34:42		pp
08831	115	38	1667 Jun 06	10:18:29	Total	0.1438	1.6205	317.8	210.4	95.2	7:39:35	12:57:23	8:33:17	9:30:53	11:06:05	12:03:41		pp
08877	115	39	1685 Jun 16	17:45:43	Total	0.2172	1.4869	315.4	207.5	89.0	15:08:01	20:23:25	16:01:58	17:01:13	18:30:13	19:29:28		-p
08923	115	40	1703 Jun 29	1:12:47	Total	0.2910	1.3522	312.4	203.4	79.5	22:36:35	3:48:59	23:31:05	0:33:02	1:52:32	2:54:29		-p
08970	115	41	1721 Jul 09	8:39:47	Total	0.3650	1.2167	308.7	198.1	65.2	6:05:26	11:14:08	7:00:44	8:07:11	9:12:23	10:18:50		-p
09017	115	42	1739 Jul 20	16:09:12	Total	0.4373	1.0842	304.5	191.7	42.3	13:36:57	18:41:27	14:33:21	15:48:03	16:30:21	17:45:03		-a
09064	115	43	1757 Jul 30	23:39:48	Partial	0.5087	0.9529	299.6	183.9		21:10:00	2:09:36	22:07:51			1:11:45		-a
09110	115	44	1775 Aug 11	7:15:46	Partial	0.5755	0.8298	294.4	175.2		4:48:34	9:42:58	5:48:10			8:43:22		-a
09155	115	45	1793 Aug 21	14:55:22	Partial	0.6392	0.7120	288.8	165.5		12:30:58	17:19:46	13:32:37			16:18:07		-a
09200	115	46	1811 Sep 02	22:41:52	Partial	0.6972	0.6045	283.3	155.1		20:20:13	1:03:31	21:24:19			23:59:25		-a
09245	115	47	1829 Sep 13	6:33:27	Partial	0.7509	0.5046	277.7	143.9		4:14:36	8:52:18	5:21:30			7:45:24		-a
09292	115	48	1847 Sep 24	14:33:44	Partial	0.7973	0.4181	272.5	132.7		12:17:29	16:49:59	13:27:23			15:40:05		-a
09336	115	49	1865 Oct 04	22:40:01	Partial	0.8386	0.3408	267.6	121.2		20:26:13	0:53:49	21:39:25			23:40:37		-a
09379	115	50	1883 Oct 16	6:54:15	Partial	0.8732	0.2757	263.3	110.1		4:42:36	9:05:54	5:59:12			7:49:18		-a
09423	115	51	1901 Oct 27	15:15:18	Partial	0.9021	0.2208	259.6	99.4		13:05:30	17:25:06	14:25:36			16:05:00		-a
09465	115	52	1919 Nov 07	23:44:28	Partial	0.9246	0.1780	256.7	89.8		21:36:07	1:52:49	22:59:34			0:29:22		-a
09507	115	53	1937 Nov 18	8:19:26	Partial	0.9421	0.1443	254.5	81.3		6:12:11	10:26:41	7:38:47			9:00:05		-a
09548	115	54	1955 Nov 29	17:00:00	Partial	0.9551	0.1190	253.0	74.2		14:53:30	19:06:30	16:22:54			17:37:06		-a
09590	115	55	1973 Dec 10	1:45:06	Partial	0.9644	0.1007	252.0	68.5		23:39:06	3:51:06	1:10:51			2:19:21		-a
09631	115	56	1991 Dec 21	10:34:00	Partial	0.9709	0.0876	251.5	64.1		8:28:15	12:39:45	10:01:57			11:06:03		-a
09672	115	57	2009 Dec 31	19:23:46	Partial	0.9765	0.0763	251.1	60.0		17:18:13	21:29:19	18:53:46			19:53:46		-a
09713	115	58	2028 Jan 12	4:14:13	Partial	0.9817	0.0662	250.7	56.0		2:08:52	6:19:34	3:46:13			4:42:13		-a
09753	115	59	2046 Jan 22	13:02:37	Partial	0.9885	0.0532	250.0	50.4		10:57:37	15:07:37	12:37:25			13:27:49		-a
09794	115	60	2064 Feb 02	21:48:57	Partial	0.9969	0.0377	249.0	42.5		19:44:27	23:53:27	21:27:42			22:10:12		-a
09835	115	61	2082 Feb 13	6:29:19	Partial	1.0101	0.0134	247.2	25.5		4:25:43	8:32:55	6:16:34			6:42:04		-a
09877	115	62	2100 Feb 24	15:05:11	Penumbral	1.0267	-0.0170	244.6			13:02:53	17:07:29						-a
09919	115	63	2118 Mar 07	23:33:04	Penumbral	1.0496	-0.0588	240.8			21:32:40	1:33:28						-a
09961	115	64	2136 Mar 18	7:53:55	Penumbral	1.0778	-0.1103	235.6			5:56:07	9:51:43						-a
10005	115	65	2154 Mar 29	16:05:07	Penumbral	1.1135	-0.1757	228.6			14:10:49	17:59:25						-a
10048	115	66	2172 Apr 09	0:08:52	Penumbral	1.1548	-0.2513	219.8			22:18:58	1:58:46						-a
10091	115	67	2190 Apr 20	8:03:22	Penumbral	1.2034	-0.3402	208.3			6:19:13	9:47:31						-a
10134	115	68	2208 May 1	15:49:06	Penumbral	1.2583	-0.4410	193.6			14:12:18	17:25:54						-a
10178	115	69	2226 May 12	23:26:43	Penumbral	1.3191	-0.5527	174.8			21:59:19	0:54:07						-a
10223	115	70	2244 May 23	6:56:57	Penumbral	1.3850	-0.6741	150.3			5:41:48	8:12:06						-a
10269	115	71	2262 Jun 03	14:20:47	Penumbral	1.4554	-0.8039	116.3			13:22:38	15:18:56						-a
10315	115	72	2280 Jun 13	21:38:07	Penumbral	1.5302	-0.9420	57.3			21:09:28	22:06:46						-a

== See also ==
- List of lunar eclipses
  - List of Saros series for lunar eclipses
