= January 1999 lunar eclipse =

Penumbral lunar eclipse January 31, 1999

- Penumbral eclipse
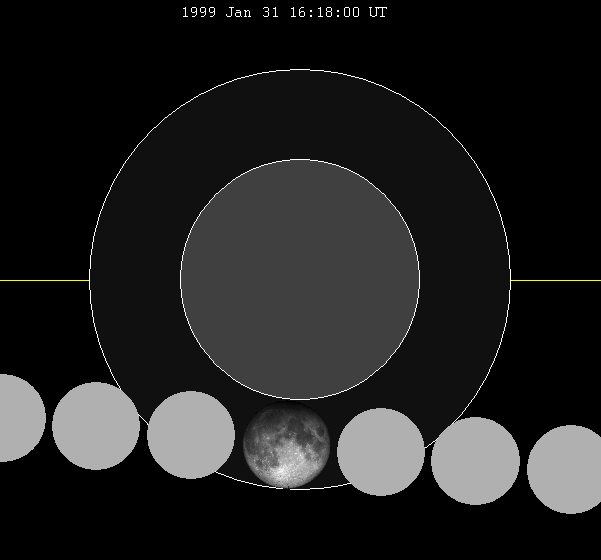
- The Moon's hourly motion shown right to left
- Date: January 31, 1999
- Gamma: −1.0190
- Magnitude: −0.0258
- Saros cycle: 114 (58 of 71)
- Penumbral: 261 minutes, 41 seconds
Contacts (UTC)
- P1: 14:06:38
- Greatest: 16:17:31
- P4: 18:28:20

A penumbral lunar eclipse occurred at the Moon’s ascending node of orbit on Sunday, January 31, 1999, with an umbral magnitude of −0.0258. It was a relatively rare total penumbral lunar eclipse, with the Moon passing entirely within the penumbral shadow without entering the darker umbral shadow. A lunar eclipse occurs when the Moon moves into the Earth's shadow, causing the Moon to be darkened. A penumbral lunar eclipse occurs when part or all of the Moon's near side passes into the Earth's penumbra. Unlike a solar eclipse, which can only be viewed from a relatively small area of the world, a lunar eclipse may be viewed from anywhere on the night side of Earth. Occurring about 4.8 days after perigee (on January 26, 1999, at 21:25 UTC), the Moon's apparent diameter was larger.

== Visibility ==
The eclipse was completely visible over Asia and Australia, seen rising over much of Africa, Europe, and the Middle East and setting over western North America and the central Pacific Ocean.

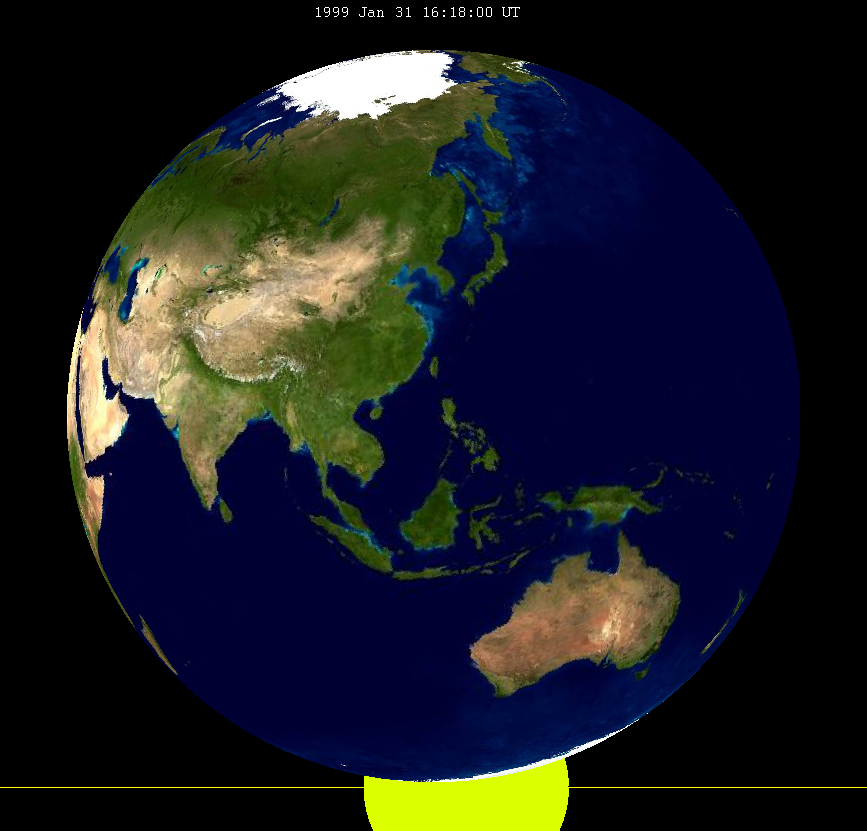
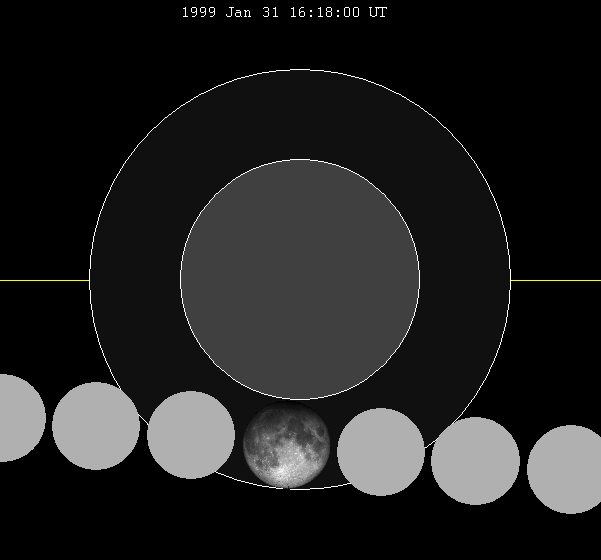

== Gallery ==
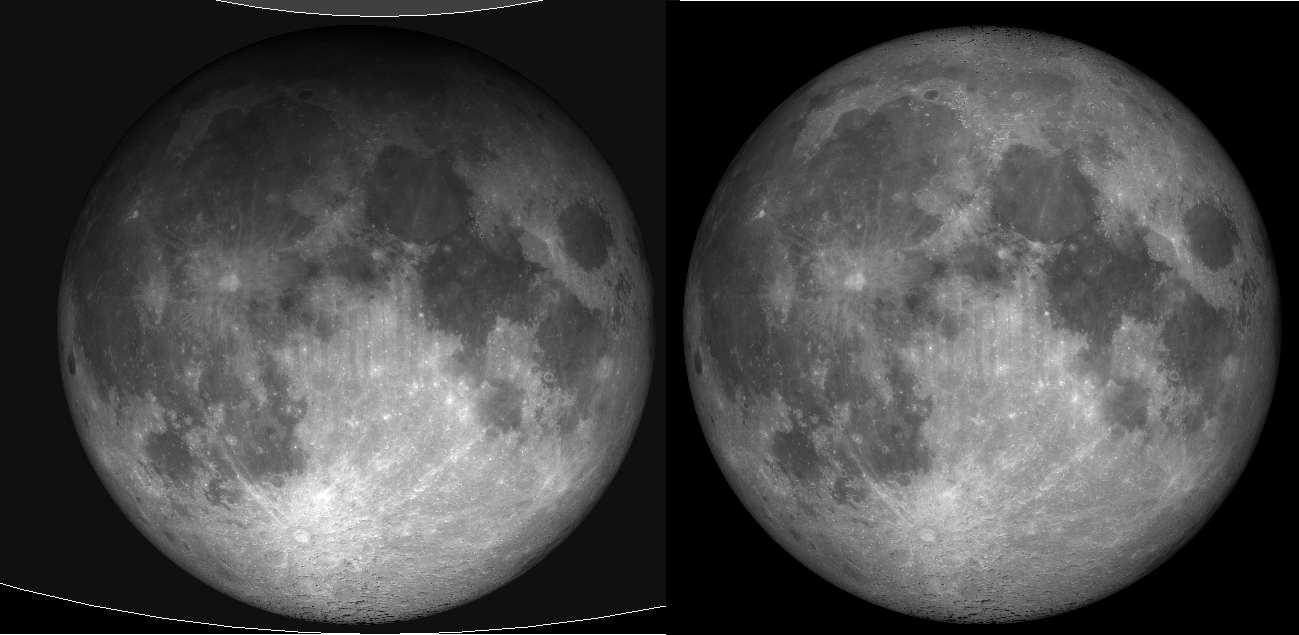
This simulated view compares this penumbral eclipse (left) to the full moon (right) as it appeared an hour before the eclipse.

== Eclipse details ==
Shown below is a table displaying details about this particular solar eclipse. It describes various parameters pertaining to this eclipse.

January 31, 1999 Lunar Eclipse Parameters
Parameter	Value
Penumbral Magnitude	1.00272
Umbral Magnitude	−0.02583
Gamma	−1.01898
Sun Right Ascension	20h55m10.7s
Sun Declination	-17°22'34.0"
Sun Semi-Diameter	16'14.0"
Sun Equatorial Horizontal Parallax	08.9"
Moon Right Ascension	08h54m26.3s
Moon Declination	+16°24'30.3"
Moon Semi-Diameter	15'47.0"
Moon Equatorial Horizontal Parallax	0°57'55.6"
ΔT	63.5 s

== Eclipse season ==
This eclipse is part of an eclipse season, a period, roughly every six months, when eclipses occur. Only two (or occasionally three) eclipse seasons occur each year, and each season lasts about 35 days and repeats just short of six months (173 days) later; thus two full eclipse seasons always occur each year. Either two or three eclipses happen each eclipse season. In the sequence below, each eclipse is separated by a fortnight.

Eclipse season of January–February 1999
January 31 Ascending node (full moon)	February 16 Descending node (new moon)
Penumbral lunar eclipse Lunar Saros 114	Annular solar eclipse Solar Saros 140

== Related eclipses ==
=== Eclipses in 1999 ===
- A penumbral lunar eclipse on January 31.
- An annular solar eclipse on February 16.
- A partial lunar eclipse on July 28.
- A total solar eclipse on August 11.

=== Metonic ===
- Preceded by: Lunar eclipse of April 15, 1995
- Followed by: Lunar eclipse of November 20, 2002

=== Tzolkinex ===
- Preceded by: Lunar eclipse of December 21, 1991
- Followed by: Lunar eclipse of March 14, 2006

=== Half-Saros ===
- Preceded by: Solar eclipse of January 26, 1990
- Followed by: Solar eclipse of February 7, 2008

=== Tritos ===
- Preceded by: Lunar eclipse of March 3, 1988
- Followed by: Lunar eclipse of December 31, 2009

=== Lunar Saros 114 ===
- Preceded by: Lunar eclipse of January 20, 1981
- Followed by: Lunar eclipse of February 11, 2017

=== Inex ===
- Preceded by: Lunar eclipse of February 21, 1970
- Followed by: Lunar eclipse of January 12, 2028

=== Triad ===
- Preceded by: Lunar eclipse of April 1, 1912
- Followed by: Lunar eclipse of December 1, 2085

=== Lunar eclipses of 1998–2002 ===
This eclipse is a member of a semester series. An eclipse in a semester series of lunar eclipses repeats approximately every 177 days and 4 hours (a semester) at alternating nodes of the Moon's orbit.

The penumbral lunar eclipses on March 13, 1998 and September 6, 1998 occur in the previous lunar year eclipse set, and the penumbral lunar eclipses on May 26, 2002 and November 20, 2002 occur in the next lunar year eclipse set.

Lunar eclipse series sets from 1998 to 2002
Descending node				Ascending node			
Saros	Date Viewing	Type Chart	Gamma	Saros	Date Viewing	Type Chart	Gamma
109	1998 Aug 08	Penumbral	1.4876	114	1999 Jan 31	Penumbral	−1.0190
119	1999 Jul 28	Partial	0.7863	124	2000 Jan 21	Total	−0.2957
129	2000 Jul 16	Total	0.0302	134	2001 Jan 09	Total	0.3720
139	2001 Jul 05	Partial	−0.7287	144	2001 Dec 30	Penumbral	1.0732
149	2002 Jun 24	Penumbral	−1.4440				

=== Saros 114 ===
This eclipse is a part of Saros series 114, repeating every 18 years, 11 days, and containing 71 events. The series started with a penumbral lunar eclipse on May 13, 971 AD. It contains partial eclipses from August 7, 1115 through February 18, 1440; total eclipses from February 28, 1458 through July 17, 1674; and a second set of partial eclipses from July 28, 1692 through November 26, 1890. The series ends at member 71 as a penumbral eclipse on June 22, 2233.

The longest duration of totality was produced by member 35 at 106 minutes, 5 seconds on May 24, 1584. All eclipses in this series occur at the Moon’s ascending node of orbit.

Greatest	First			
The greatest eclipse of the series occurred on 1584 May 24, lasting 106 minutes, 5 seconds.	Penumbral	Partial	Total	Central
The greatest eclipse of the series occurred on 1584 May 24, lasting 106 minutes, 5 seconds.	971 May 13	1115 Aug 07	1458 Feb 28	1530 Apr 12
The greatest eclipse of the series occurred on 1584 May 24, lasting 106 minutes, 5 seconds.	Last			
The greatest eclipse of the series occurred on 1584 May 24, lasting 106 minutes, 5 seconds.	Central	Total	Partial	Penumbral
The greatest eclipse of the series occurred on 1584 May 24, lasting 106 minutes, 5 seconds.	1638 Jun 26	1674 Jul 17	1890 Nov 26	2233 Jun 22

Eclipses are tabulated in three columns; every third eclipse in the same column is one exeligmos apart, so they all cast shadows over approximately the same parts of the Earth.

Series members 48–69 occur between 1801 and 2200:
48	49	50
1818 Oct 14	1836 Oct 24	1854 Nov 04
51	52	53
1872 Nov 15	1890 Nov 26	1908 Dec 07
54	55	56
1926 Dec 19	1944 Dec 29	1963 Jan 09
57	58	59
1981 Jan 20	1999 Jan 31	2017 Feb 11
60	61	62
2035 Feb 22	2053 Mar 04	2071 Mar 16
63	64	65
2089 Mar 26	2107 Apr 07	2125 Apr 18
66	67	68
2143 Apr 29	2161 May 09	2179 May 21
69
2197 May 31

=== Tritos series ===
This eclipse is a part of a tritos cycle, repeating at alternating nodes every 135 synodic months (≈ 3986.63 days, or 11 years minus 1 month). Their appearance and longitude are irregular due to a lack of synchronization with the anomalistic month (period of perigee), but groupings of 3 tritos cycles (≈ 33 years minus 3 months) come close (≈ 434.044 anomalistic months), so eclipses are similar in these groupings.

Series members between 1835 and 2200
1835 May 12 (Saros 99)	1846 Apr 11 (Saros 100)		1868 Feb 08 (Saros 102)	1879 Jan 08 (Saros 103)
				1933 Aug 05 (Saros 108)
1944 Jul 06 (Saros 109)	1955 Jun 05 (Saros 110)	1966 May 04 (Saros 111)	1977 Apr 04 (Saros 112)	1988 Mar 03 (Saros 113)
1999 Jan 31 (Saros 114)	2009 Dec 31 (Saros 115)	2020 Nov 30 (Saros 116)	2031 Oct 30 (Saros 117)	2042 Sep 29 (Saros 118)
2053 Aug 29 (Saros 119)	2064 Jul 28 (Saros 120)	2075 Jun 28 (Saros 121)	2086 May 28 (Saros 122)	2097 Apr 26 (Saros 123)
2108 Mar 27 (Saros 124)	2119 Feb 25 (Saros 125)	2130 Jan 24 (Saros 126)	2140 Dec 23 (Saros 127)	2151 Nov 24 (Saros 128)
2162 Oct 23 (Saros 129)	2173 Sep 21 (Saros 130)	2184 Aug 21 (Saros 131)	2195 Jul 22 (Saros 132)	

=== Inex series ===
This eclipse is a part of the long period inex cycle, repeating at alternating nodes, every 358 synodic months (≈ 10,571.95 days, or 29 years minus 20 days). Their appearance and longitude are irregular due to a lack of synchronization with the anomalistic month (period of perigee). However, groupings of 3 inex cycles (≈ 87 years minus 2 months) comes close (≈ 1,151.02 anomalistic months), so eclipses are similar in these groupings.

Series members between 1801 and 2200
1825 Jun 01 (Saros 108)	1854 May 12 (Saros 109)	1883 Apr 22 (Saros 110)
1912 Apr 01 (Saros 111)	1941 Mar 13 (Saros 112)	1970 Feb 21 (Saros 113)
1999 Jan 31 (Saros 114)	2028 Jan 12 (Saros 115)	2056 Dec 22 (Saros 116)
2085 Dec 01 (Saros 117)	2114 Nov 12 (Saros 118)	2143 Oct 23 (Saros 119)
2172 Oct 02 (Saros 120)

=== Half-Saros cycle ===
A lunar eclipse will be preceded and followed by solar eclipses by 9 years and 5.5 days (a half saros). This lunar eclipse is related to two annular solar eclipses of Solar Saros 121.

January 26, 1990	February 7, 2008

== See also ==
- List of lunar eclipses
- List of 20th-century lunar eclipses
