= Solar Saros 122 =

Saros cycle series 122 for solar eclipses

Saros 122

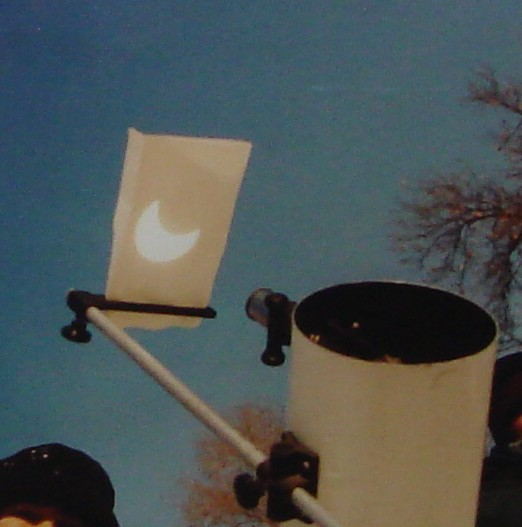
December 25, 2000 Series member 57

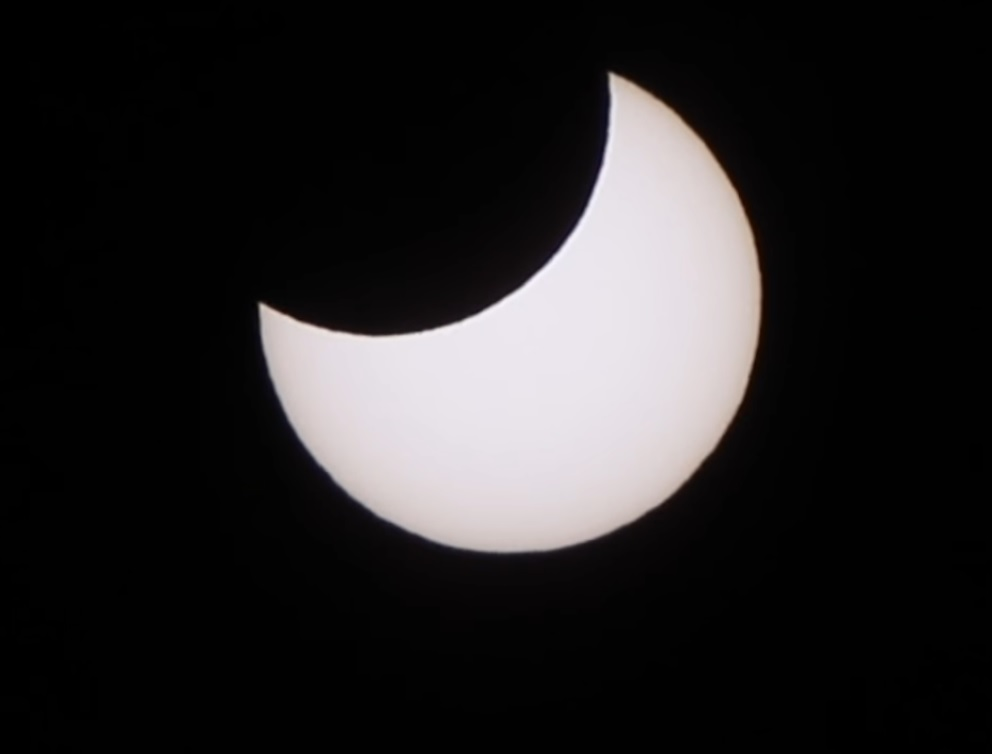
January 6, 2019 Series member 58

Saros cycle series 122 for solar eclipses occurs at the Moon's descending node, repeating every 18 years, 11 days, containing 70 eclipses, 42 of which are umbral (3 total, 2 hybrid, and 37 annular). The first eclipse was on 17 April 991 and the last will be on 17 May 2235. The most recent eclipse was a partial eclipse on 6 January 2019 and the next will be a partial eclipse on 16 January 2037.

The longest totality was 1 minute 25 seconds on 12 July 1135, the longest annular was 6 minutes 28 seconds on 10 October 1874, and the longest hybrid was 43 seconds on 13 August 1189.

This solar saros is linked to Lunar Saros 115.

== Umbral eclipses ==
Umbral eclipses (annular, total and hybrid) can be further classified as either: 1) Central (two limits), 2) Central (one limit) or 3) Non-Central (one limit). The statistical distribution of these classes in Saros series 122 appears in the following table.

Classification	Number	Percent
All Umbral eclipses	42	100.00%
Central (two limits)	41	97.62%
Central (one limit)	1	2.38%
Non-central (one limit)	0	0.00%

== All eclipses ==
Note: Dates are given in the Julian calendar prior to 15 October 1582, and in the Gregorian calendar after that.

Saros	Member	Date	Time (Greatest) UTC	Type	Location Lat, Long	Gamma	Mag.	Width (km)	Duration (min:sec)	Ref
122	1	April 17, 991	10:00:06	Partial	70.8S 87.9E	-1.5013	0.0624			
122	2	April 27, 1009	17:33:05	Partial	70.1S 38.6W	-1.4445	0.17			
122	3	May 9, 1027	1:00:48	Partial	69.3S 163.3W	-1.384	0.2848			
122	4	May 19, 1045	8:21:52	Partial	68.3S 74.3E	-1.3184	0.4089			
122	5	May 30, 1063	15:39:34	Partial	67.4S 46.7W	-1.2508	0.5365			
122	6	June 9, 1081	22:52:36	Partial	66.4S 166.1W	-1.18	0.6695			
122	7	June 21, 1099	6:05:15	Partial	65.4S 75.1E	-1.1092	0.8015			
122	8	July 1, 1117	13:16:27	Partial	64.5S 43W	-1.0377	0.9337			
122	9	July 12, 1135	20:28:48	Total	51.5S 147.8W	-0.9676	1.0179	248	1m 25s	
122	10	July 23, 1153	3:42:38	Total	41.6S 105E	-0.8994	1.0161	125	1m 22s	
122	11	August 3, 1171	11:00:18	Total	36.2S 4.6W	-0.835	1.0126	77	1m 6s	
122	12	August 13, 1189	18:22:08	Hybrid	33.2S 115.4W	-0.7744	1.0082	43	0m 43s	
122	13	August 25, 1207	1:48:51	Hybrid	31.9S 132.6E	-0.7186	1.0031	15	0m 16s	
122	14	September 4, 1225	9:21:58	Annular	31.9S 19E	-0.6686	0.9977	11	0m 12s	
122	15	September 15, 1243	17:01:45	Annular	33S 96W	-0.6249	0.992	35	0m 42s	
122	16	September 26, 1261	0:48:31	Annular	35S 147.3E	-0.5878	0.9863	59	1m 12s	
122	17	October 7, 1279	8:42:21	Annular	37.6S 29.1E	-0.5573	0.9805	82	1m 42s	
122	18	October 17, 1297	16:42:50	Annular	40.6S 90.4W	-0.533	0.9751	104	2m 11s	
122	19	October 29, 1315	0:49:59	Annular	43.8S 149.1E	-0.515	0.9698	126	2m 40s	
122	20	November 8, 1333	9:01:11	Annular	46.8S 28.4E	-0.5012	0.9651	145	3m 6s	
122	21	November 19, 1351	17:18:04	Annular	49.4S 92.7W	-0.4929	0.9608	163	3m 32s	
122	22	November 30, 1369	1:36:58	Annular	51.4S 146.6E	-0.4873	0.957	179	3m 55s	
122	23	December 11, 1387	9:58:30	Annular	52.4S 26.1E	-0.4843	0.9539	193	4m 16s	
122	24	December 21, 1405	18:17:58	Annular	52.2S 93.7W	-0.4803	0.9514	204	4m 35s	
122	25	January 2, 1424	2:37:16	Annular	50.7S 146.2E	-0.4768	0.9495	211	4m 52s	
122	26	January 12, 1442	10:51:53	Annular	48S 26.1E	-0.4704	0.9481	216	5m 6s	
122	27	January 23, 1460	19:01:52	Annular	44.2S 94W	-0.4607	0.9474	218	5m 19s	
122	28	February 3, 1478	3:04:10	Annular	39.5S 146.4E	-0.4455	0.9472	217	5m 31s	
122	29	February 14, 1496	10:59:31	Annular	34.2S 27.5E	-0.4249	0.9474	213	5m 41s	
122	30	February 24, 1514	18:45:30	Annular	28.2S 90W	-0.3974	0.9479	208	5m 51s	
122	31	March 7, 1532	2:21:40	Annular	21.8S 154.3E	-0.3625	0.9488	201	5m 59s	
122	32	March 18, 1550	9:47:48	Annular	15.1S 40.8E	-0.32	0.9497	194	6m 5s	
122	33	March 28, 1568	17:04:21	Annular	8.1S 70.5W	-0.2701	0.9507	187	6m 10s	
122	34	April 19, 1586	0:10:09	Annular	0.9S 179.1W	-0.212	0.9517	181	6m 12s	
122	35	April 29, 1604	7:07:21	Annular	6.3N 74.8E	-0.1473	0.9525	176	6m 12s	
122	36	May 10, 1622	13:55:35	Annular	13.5N 28.8W	-0.0757	0.9531	172	6m 7s	
122	37	May 20, 1640	20:37:52	Annular	20.4N 130.2W	0.0002	0.9533	171	6m 0s	
122	38	June 1, 1658	3:11:38	Annular	27N 131.3E	0.0828	0.9532	172	5m 49s	
122	39	June 11, 1676	9:42:37	Annular	33N 34.6E	0.1673	0.9527	176	5m 38s	
122	40	June 22, 1694	16:08:45	Annular	38.4N 59.7W	0.2556	0.9517	183	5m 27s	
122	41	July 3, 1712	22:34:57	Annular	42.8N 152.7W	0.3433	0.9503	194	5m 18s	
122	42	July 15, 1730	4:59:09	Annular	46.3N 115.9E	0.4325	0.9484	210	5m 13s	
122	43	July 25, 1748	11:27:02	Annular	48.7N 24.5E	0.5183	0.9461	231	5m 12s	
122	44	August 5, 1766	17:56:58	Annular	50.2N 67W	0.6023	0.9433	260	5m 15s	
122	45	August 16, 1784	0:31:53	Annular	50.9N 159.8W	0.6819	0.9402	299	5m 23s	
122	46	August 28, 1802	7:12:00	Annular	51.3N 105.7E	0.7569	0.9367	354	5m 35s	
122	47	September 7, 1820	13:59:58	Annular	51.6N 8.7E	0.8251	0.9329	432	5m 49s	
122	48	September 18, 1838	20:55:56	Annular	52.4N 90.6W	0.8868	0.9289	562	6m 6s	
122	49	September 29, 1856	3:59:44	Annular	54.3N 169.1E	0.942	0.9246	831	6m 21s	
122	50	October 10, 1874	11:13:33	Annular (Note: No northern limit)	58.6N 72E	0.9889	0.9193	-	6m 28s	
122	51	October 20, 1892	18:36:06	Partial	61.4N 33.3W	1.0286	0.9054			
122	52	November 2, 1910	2:08:32	Partial	61.9N 155.1W	1.0603	0.8515			
122	53	November 12, 1928	9:48:24	Partial	62.6N 81.1E	1.0861	0.8078			
122	54	November 23, 1946	17:37:12	Partial	63.4N 45.3W	1.105	0.7758			
122	55	December 4, 1964	1:31:54	Partial	64.3N 173.3W	1.1193	0.7518			
122	56	December 15, 1982	9:32:09	Partial	65.3N 56.9E	1.1293	0.735			
122	57	December 25, 2000	17:35:57	Partial	66.3N 74.1W	1.1367	0.7228			
122	58	January 6, 2019	1:42:38	Partial	67.4N 153.6E	1.1417	0.7145			
122	59	January 16, 2037	9:48:55	Partial	68.5N 20.8E	1.1477	0.7049			
122	60	January 27, 2055	17:54:05	Partial	69.5N 112.2W	1.155	0.6932			
122	61	February 7, 2073	1:55:59	Partial	70.5N 114.9E	1.1651	0.6768			
122	62	February 18, 2091	9:54:40	Partial	71.2N 17.8W	1.1779	0.6558			
122	63	March 1, 2109	17:45:53	Partial	71.8N 149.1W	1.1972	0.6238			
122	64	March 13, 2127	1:32:02	Partial	72.1N 80.4E	1.2208	0.5841			
122	65	March 23, 2145	9:09:38	Partial	72.1N 48W	1.2519	0.5311			
122	66	April 3, 2163	16:41:51	Partial	71.9N 175W	1.2876	0.4698			
122	67	April 14, 2181	0:04:05	Partial	71.5N 60.8E	1.3318	0.3931			
122	68	April 25, 2199	7:21:51	Partial	70.8N 61.7W	1.3799	0.3085			
122	69	May 6, 2217	14:31:15	Partial	70N 178.5E	1.4355	0.21			
122	70	May 17, 2235	21:36:41	Partial	69.1N 60.3E	1.4946	0.1044			
