= March 2053 lunar eclipse =

Astronomical event

- Penumbral eclipse
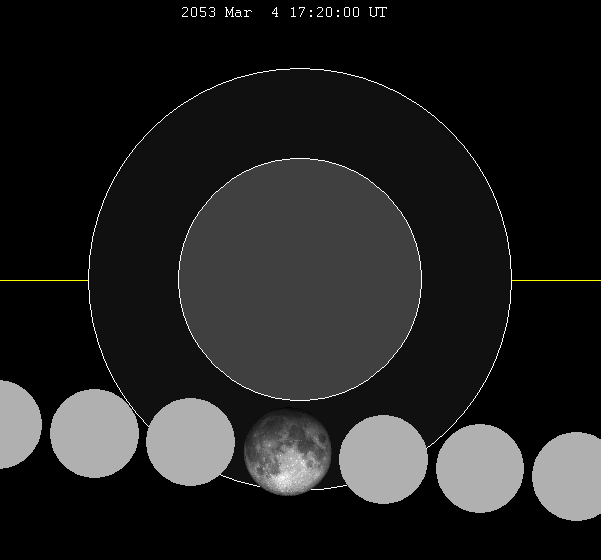
- The Moon's hourly motion shown right to left
- Date: March 4, 2053
- Gamma: −1.0530
- Magnitude: −0.0796
- Saros cycle: 114 (61 of 71)
- Penumbral: 251 minutes, 5 seconds
Contacts (UTC)
- P1: 15:14:56
- Greatest: 17:20:31
- P4: 19:26:01

A penumbral lunar eclipse will occur at the Moon’s ascending node of orbit on Tuesday, March 4, 2053, with an umbral magnitude of −0.0796. A lunar eclipse occurs when the Moon moves into the Earth's shadow, causing the Moon to be darkened. A penumbral lunar eclipse occurs when part or all of the Moon's near side passes into the Earth's penumbra. Unlike a solar eclipse, which can only be viewed from a relatively small area of the world, a lunar eclipse may be viewed from anywhere on the night side of Earth. Occurring about 4.1 days after perigee (on February 28, 2053, at 15:30 UTC), the Moon's apparent diameter will be larger.

== Visibility ==
The eclipse will be completely visible over Asia and Australia, seen rising over Africa and Europe and setting over northwestern North America and the central Pacific Ocean.

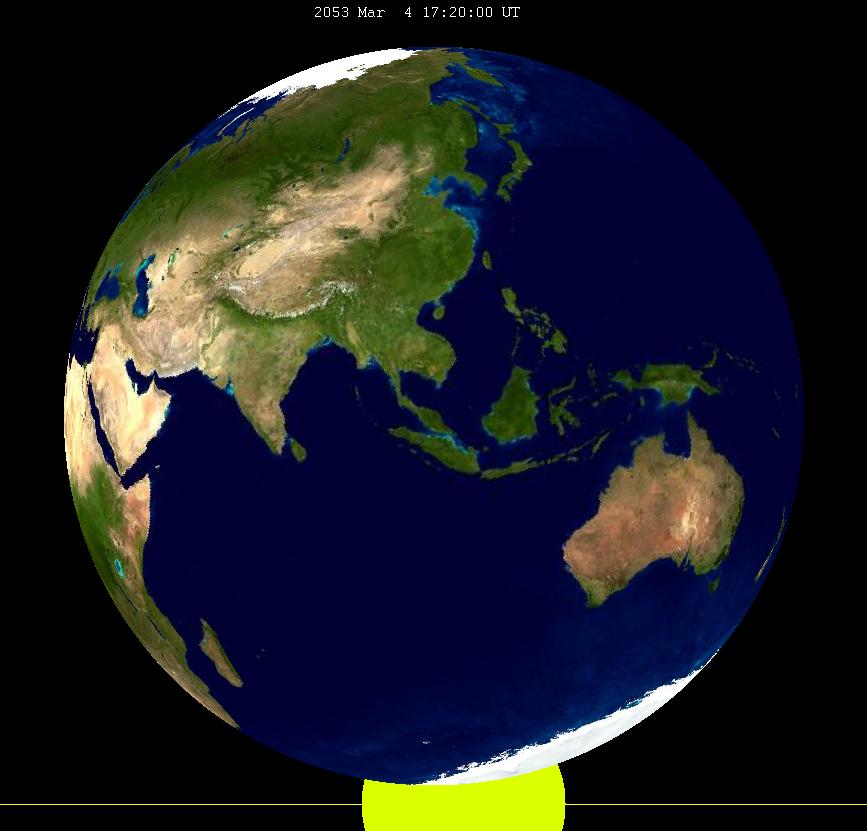
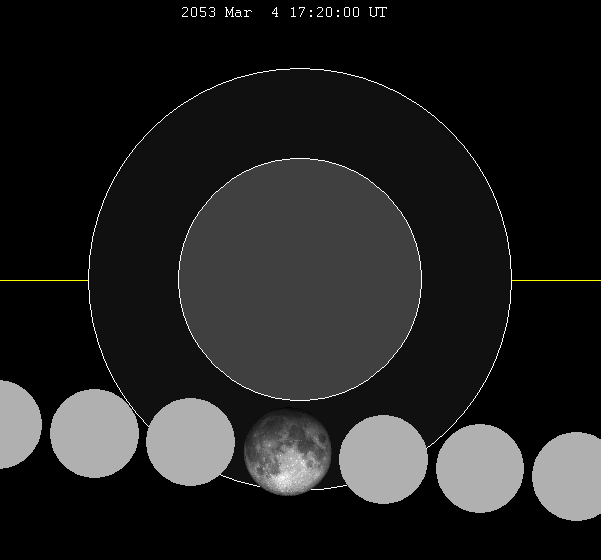

== Eclipse details ==
Shown below is a table displaying details about this particular lunar eclipse. It describes various parameters pertaining to this eclipse.

March 4, 2053 Lunar Eclipse Parameters
Parameter	Value
Penumbral Magnitude	0.93338
Umbral Magnitude	−0.07963
Gamma	−1.05310
Sun Right Ascension	23h03m14.8s
Sun Declination	-06°03'47.9"
Sun Semi-Diameter	16'07.7"
Sun Equatorial Horizontal Parallax	08.9"
Moon Right Ascension	11h02m02.1s
Moon Declination	+05°04'58.9"
Moon Semi-Diameter	15'55.3"
Moon Equatorial Horizontal Parallax	0°58'26.0"
ΔT	87.2 s

== Eclipse season ==
This eclipse is part of an eclipse season, a period, roughly every six months, when eclipses occur. Only two (or occasionally three) eclipse seasons occur each year, and each season lasts about 35 days and repeats just short of six months (173 days) later; thus two full eclipse seasons always occur each year. Either two or three eclipses happen each eclipse season. In the sequence below, each eclipse is separated by a fortnight.

Eclipse season of March 2053
March 4 Ascending node (full moon)	March 20 Descending node (new moon)
Penumbral lunar eclipse Lunar Saros 114	Annular solar eclipse Solar Saros 140

== Related eclipses ==
=== Eclipses in 2053 ===
- A penumbral lunar eclipse on March 4.
- An annular solar eclipse on March 20.
- A penumbral lunar eclipse on August 29.
- A total solar eclipse on September 12.

=== Metonic ===
- Preceded by: Lunar eclipse of May 17, 2049
- Followed by: Lunar eclipse of December 22, 2056

=== Tzolkinex ===
- Preceded by: Lunar eclipse of January 22, 2046
- Followed by: Lunar eclipse of April 15, 2060

=== Half-Saros ===
- Preceded by: Solar eclipse of February 28, 2044
- Followed by: Solar eclipse of March 11, 2062

=== Tritos ===
- Preceded by: Lunar eclipse of April 5, 2042
- Followed by: Lunar eclipse of February 2, 2064

=== Lunar Saros 114 ===
- Preceded by: Lunar eclipse of February 22, 2035
- Followed by: Lunar eclipse of March 16, 2071

=== Inex ===
- Preceded by: Lunar eclipse of March 25, 2024
- Followed by: Lunar eclipse of February 13, 2082

=== Triad ===
- Preceded by: Lunar eclipse of May 4, 1966
- Followed by: Lunar eclipse of January 4, 2140

=== Lunar eclipses of 2053–2056 ===
This eclipse is a member of a semester series. An eclipse in a semester series of lunar eclipses repeats approximately every 177 days and 4 hours (a semester) at alternating nodes of the Moon's orbit.

The penumbral lunar eclipses on June 27, 2056 and December 22, 2056 occur in the next lunar year eclipse set.

Lunar eclipse series sets from 2053 to 2056
Ascending node				Descending node			
Saros	Date Viewing	Type Chart	Gamma	Saros	Date Viewing	Type Chart	Gamma
114	2053 Mar 04	Penumbral	−1.0530	119	2053 Aug 29	Penumbral	1.0165
124	2054 Feb 22	Total	−0.3242	129	2054 Aug 18	Total	0.2806
134	2055 Feb 11	Total	0.3526	139	2055 Aug 07	Partial	−0.4769
144	2056 Feb 01	Penumbral	1.0682	149	2056 Jul 26	Partial	−1.2048

=== Saros 114 ===
This eclipse is a part of Saros series 114, repeating every 18 years, 11 days, and containing 71 events. The series started with a penumbral lunar eclipse on May 13, 971 AD. It contains partial eclipses from August 7, 1115 through February 18, 1440; total eclipses from February 28, 1458 through July 17, 1674; and a second set of partial eclipses from July 28, 1692 through November 26, 1890. The series ends at member 71 as a penumbral eclipse on June 22, 2233.

The longest duration of totality was produced by member 35 at 106 minutes, 5 seconds on May 24, 1584. All eclipses in this series occur at the Moon’s ascending node of orbit.

Greatest	First			
The greatest eclipse of the series occurred on 1584 May 24, lasting 106 minutes, 5 seconds.	Penumbral	Partial	Total	Central
The greatest eclipse of the series occurred on 1584 May 24, lasting 106 minutes, 5 seconds.	971 May 13	1115 Aug 07	1458 Feb 28	1530 Apr 12
The greatest eclipse of the series occurred on 1584 May 24, lasting 106 minutes, 5 seconds.	Last			
The greatest eclipse of the series occurred on 1584 May 24, lasting 106 minutes, 5 seconds.	Central	Total	Partial	Penumbral
The greatest eclipse of the series occurred on 1584 May 24, lasting 106 minutes, 5 seconds.	1638 Jun 26	1674 Jul 17	1890 Nov 26	2233 Jun 22

Eclipses are tabulated in three columns; every third eclipse in the same column is one exeligmos apart, so they all cast shadows over approximately the same parts of the Earth.

Series members 48–69 occur between 1801 and 2200:
48	49	50
1818 Oct 14	1836 Oct 24	1854 Nov 04
51	52	53
1872 Nov 15	1890 Nov 26	1908 Dec 07
54	55	56
1926 Dec 19	1944 Dec 29	1963 Jan 09
57	58	59
1981 Jan 20	1999 Jan 31	2017 Feb 11
60	61	62
2035 Feb 22	2053 Mar 04	2071 Mar 16
63	64	65
2089 Mar 26	2107 Apr 07	2125 Apr 18
66	67	68
2143 Apr 29	2161 May 09	2179 May 21
69
2197 May 31

=== Tritos series ===
This eclipse is a part of a tritos cycle, repeating at alternating nodes every 135 synodic months (≈ 3986.63 days, or 11 years minus 1 month). Their appearance and longitude are irregular due to a lack of synchronization with the anomalistic month (period of perigee), but groupings of 3 tritos cycles (≈ 33 years minus 3 months) come close (≈ 434.044 anomalistic months), so eclipses are similar in these groupings.

Series members between 1922 and 2200
1922 Mar 13 (Saros 102)	1933 Feb 10 (Saros 103)			
		1998 Aug 08 (Saros 109)	2009 Jul 07 (Saros 110)	2020 Jun 05 (Saros 111)
2031 May 07 (Saros 112)	2042 Apr 05 (Saros 113)	2053 Mar 04 (Saros 114)	2064 Feb 02 (Saros 115)	2075 Jan 02 (Saros 116)
2085 Dec 01 (Saros 117)	2096 Oct 31 (Saros 118)	2107 Oct 02 (Saros 119)	2118 Aug 31 (Saros 120)	2129 Jul 31 (Saros 121)
2140 Jun 30 (Saros 122)	2151 May 30 (Saros 123)	2162 Apr 29 (Saros 124)	2173 Mar 29 (Saros 125)	2184 Feb 26 (Saros 126)
2195 Jan 26 (Saros 127)

=== Inex series ===
This eclipse is a part of the long period inex cycle, repeating at alternating nodes, every 358 synodic months (≈ 10,571.95 days, or 29 years minus 20 days). Their appearance and longitude are irregular due to a lack of synchronization with the anomalistic month (period of perigee). However, groupings of 3 inex cycles (≈ 87 years minus 2 months) comes close (≈ 1,151.02 anomalistic months), so eclipses are similar in these groupings.

Series members between 1801 and 2200
1821 Aug 13 (Saros 106)	1850 Jul 24 (Saros 107)	1879 Jul 03 (Saros 108)
1908 Jun 14 (Saros 109)	1937 May 25 (Saros 110)	1966 May 04 (Saros 111)
1995 Apr 15 (Saros 112)	2024 Mar 25 (Saros 113)	2053 Mar 04 (Saros 114)
2082 Feb 13 (Saros 115)	2111 Jan 25 (Saros 116)	2140 Jan 04 (Saros 117)
2168 Dec 14 (Saros 118)	2197 Nov 24 (Saros 119)	

=== Half-Saros cycle ===
A lunar eclipse will be preceded and followed by solar eclipses by 9 years and 5.5 days (a half saros). This lunar eclipse is related to two total solar eclipses of Solar Saros 121.

February 28, 2044	March 11, 2062

== See also ==
- List of lunar eclipses and List of 21st-century lunar eclipses
