= January 1981 lunar eclipse =

Penumbral lunar eclipse January 20, 1981

- Penumbral eclipse
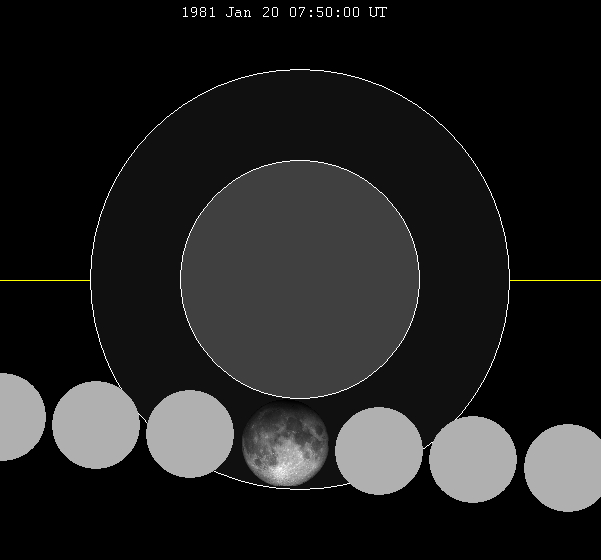
- The Moon's hourly motion shown right to left
- Date: January 20, 1981
- Gamma: −1.0142
- Magnitude: −0.0192
- Saros cycle: 114 (57 of 71)
- Penumbral: 263 minutes, 50 seconds
Contacts (UTC)
- P1: 5:38:00
- Greatest: 7:49:57
- P4: 10:01:50

A penumbral lunar eclipse occurred at the Moon's ascending node of orbit on Tuesday, January 20, 1981, with an umbral magnitude of −0.0192. It was a relatively rare total penumbral lunar eclipse, with the Moon passing entirely within the penumbral shadow without entering the darker umbral shadow. A lunar eclipse occurs when the Moon moves into the Earth's shadow, causing the Moon to be darkened. A penumbral lunar eclipse occurs when part or all of the Moon's near side passes into the Earth's penumbra. Unlike a solar eclipse, which can only be viewed from a relatively small area of the world, a lunar eclipse may be viewed from anywhere on the night side of Earth. Occurring about 5.2 days after perigee (on January 15, 1981, at 3:35 UTC), the Moon's apparent diameter was larger.

== Visibility ==
The eclipse was completely visible over northeast Asia, North America, and western South America, seen rising over east Asia and eastern Australia and setting over eastern South America, west Africa and much of Europe.

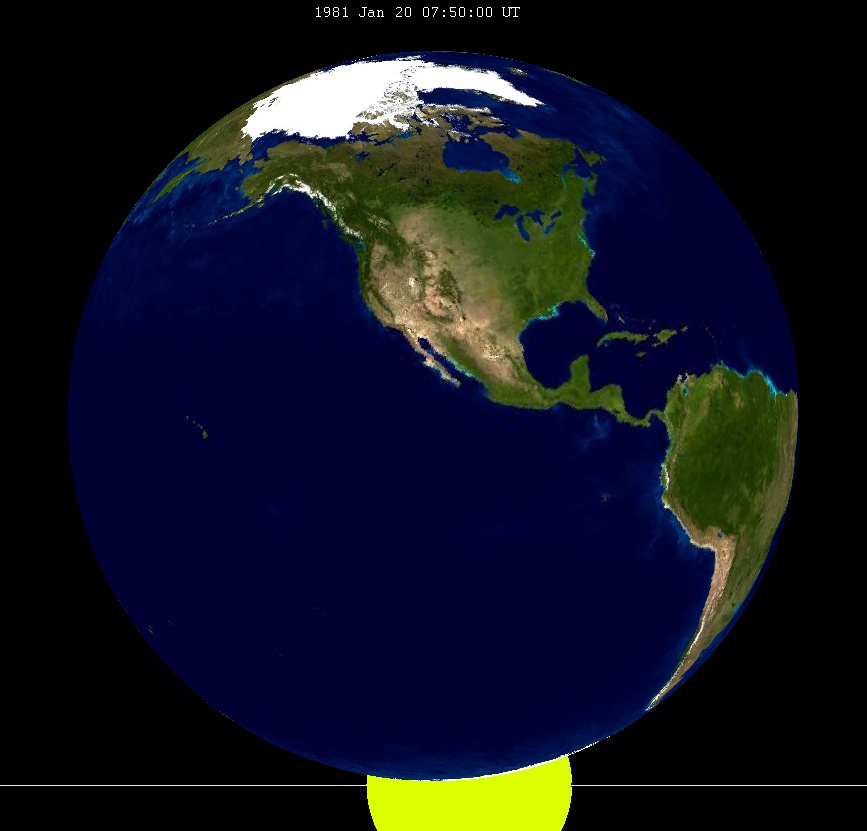
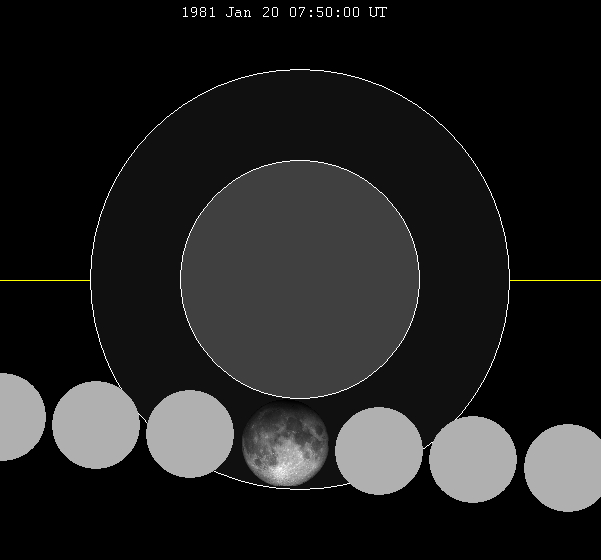

== Eclipse details ==
Shown below is a table displaying details about this particular solar eclipse. It describes various parameters pertaining to this eclipse.

January 20, 1981 Lunar Eclipse Parameters
Parameter	Value
Penumbral Magnitude	1.01360
Umbral Magnitude	−0.01916
Gamma	−1.01421
Sun Right Ascension	20h09m28.4s
Sun Declination	-20°06'46.4"
Sun Semi-Diameter	16'15.2"
Sun Equatorial Horizontal Parallax	08.9"
Moon Right Ascension	08h08m59.5s
Moon Declination	+19°08'35.7"
Moon Semi-Diameter	15'44.3"
Moon Equatorial Horizontal Parallax	0°57'45.5"
ΔT	51.4 s

== Eclipse season ==
This eclipse is part of an eclipse season, a period, roughly every six months, when eclipses occur. Only two (or occasionally three) eclipse seasons occur each year, and each season lasts about 35 days and repeats just short of six months (173 days) later; thus two full eclipse seasons always occur each year. Either two or three eclipses happen each eclipse season. In the sequence below, each eclipse is separated by a fortnight.

Eclipse season of January–February 1981
January 20 Ascending node (full moon)	February 4 Descending node (new moon)
Penumbral lunar eclipse Lunar Saros 114	Annular solar eclipse Solar Saros 140

== Related eclipses ==
=== Eclipses in 1981 ===
- A penumbral lunar eclipse on January 20.
- An annular solar eclipse on February 4.
- A partial lunar eclipse on July 17.
- A total solar eclipse on July 31.

=== Metonic ===
- Preceded by: Lunar eclipse of April 4, 1977
- Followed by: Lunar eclipse of November 8, 1984

=== Tzolkinex ===
- Preceded by: Lunar eclipse of December 10, 1973
- Followed by: Lunar eclipse of March 3, 1988

=== Half-Saros ===
- Preceded by: Solar eclipse of January 16, 1972
- Followed by: Solar eclipse of January 26, 1990

=== Tritos ===
- Preceded by: Lunar eclipse of February 21, 1970
- Followed by: Lunar eclipse of December 21, 1991

=== Lunar Saros 114 ===
- Preceded by: Lunar eclipse of January 9, 1963
- Followed by: Lunar eclipse of January 31, 1999

=== Inex ===
- Preceded by: Lunar eclipse of February 11, 1952
- Followed by: Lunar eclipse of December 31, 2009

=== Triad ===
- Preceded by: Lunar eclipse of March 21, 1894
- Followed by: Lunar eclipse of November 21, 2067

=== Lunar eclipses of 1980–1984 ===
This eclipse is a member of a semester series. An eclipse in a semester series of lunar eclipses repeats approximately every 177 days and 4 hours (a semester) at alternating nodes of the Moon's orbit.

The penumbral lunar eclipses on March 1, 1980 and August 26, 1980 occur in the previous lunar year eclipse set, and the penumbral lunar eclipses on May 15, 1984 and November 8, 1984 occur in the next lunar year eclipse set.

Lunar eclipse series sets from 1980 to 1984
Descending node				Ascending node			
Saros	Date Viewing	Type Chart	Gamma	Saros	Date Viewing	Type Chart	Gamma
109	1980 Jul 27	Penumbral	1.4139	114	1981 Jan 20	Penumbral	−1.0142
119	1981 Jul 17	Partial	0.7045	124	1982 Jan 09	Total	−0.2916
129	1982 Jul 06	Total	−0.0579	134	1982 Dec 30	Total	0.3758
139	1983 Jun 25	Partial	−0.8152	144	1983 Dec 20	Penumbral	1.0747
149	1984 Jun 13	Penumbral	−1.5240				

=== Saros 114 ===
This eclipse is a part of Saros series 114, repeating every 18 years, 11 days, and containing 71 events. The series started with a penumbral lunar eclipse on May 13, 971 AD. It contains partial eclipses from August 7, 1115 through February 18, 1440; total eclipses from February 28, 1458 through July 17, 1674; and a second set of partial eclipses from July 28, 1692 through November 26, 1890. The series ends at member 71 as a penumbral eclipse on June 22, 2233.

The longest duration of totality was produced by member 35 at 106 minutes, 5 seconds on May 24, 1584. All eclipses in this series occur at the Moon’s ascending node of orbit.

Greatest	First			
The greatest eclipse of the series occurred on 1584 May 24, lasting 106 minutes, 5 seconds.	Penumbral	Partial	Total	Central
The greatest eclipse of the series occurred on 1584 May 24, lasting 106 minutes, 5 seconds.	971 May 13	1115 Aug 07	1458 Feb 28	1530 Apr 12
The greatest eclipse of the series occurred on 1584 May 24, lasting 106 minutes, 5 seconds.	Last			
The greatest eclipse of the series occurred on 1584 May 24, lasting 106 minutes, 5 seconds.	Central	Total	Partial	Penumbral
The greatest eclipse of the series occurred on 1584 May 24, lasting 106 minutes, 5 seconds.	1638 Jun 26	1674 Jul 17	1890 Nov 26	2233 Jun 22

Eclipses are tabulated in three columns; every third eclipse in the same column is one exeligmos apart, so they all cast shadows over approximately the same parts of the Earth.

Series members 48–69 occur between 1801 and 2200:
48	49	50
1818 Oct 14	1836 Oct 24	1854 Nov 04
51	52	53
1872 Nov 15	1890 Nov 26	1908 Dec 07
54	55	56
1926 Dec 19	1944 Dec 29	1963 Jan 09
57	58	59
1981 Jan 20	1999 Jan 31	2017 Feb 11
60	61	62
2035 Feb 22	2053 Mar 04	2071 Mar 16
63	64	65
2089 Mar 26	2107 Apr 07	2125 Apr 18
66	67	68
2143 Apr 29	2161 May 09	2179 May 21
69
2197 May 31

=== Tritos series ===
This eclipse is a part of a tritos cycle, repeating at alternating nodes every 135 synodic months (≈ 3986.63 days, or 11 years minus 1 month). Their appearance and longitude are irregular due to a lack of synchronization with the anomalistic month (period of perigee), but groupings of 3 tritos cycles (≈ 33 years minus 3 months) come close (≈ 434.044 anomalistic months), so eclipses are similar in these groupings.

Series members between 1817 and 2200
1817 May 01 (Saros 99)	1828 Mar 31 (Saros 100)	1839 Feb 28 (Saros 101)	1850 Jan 28 (Saros 102)	1860 Dec 28 (Saros 103)
		1893 Sep 25 (Saros 106)		1915 Jul 26 (Saros 108)
1926 Jun 25 (Saros 109)	1937 May 25 (Saros 110)	1948 Apr 23 (Saros 111)	1959 Mar 24 (Saros 112)	1970 Feb 21 (Saros 113)
1981 Jan 20 (Saros 114)	1991 Dec 21 (Saros 115)	2002 Nov 20 (Saros 116)	2013 Oct 18 (Saros 117)	2024 Sep 18 (Saros 118)
2035 Aug 19 (Saros 119)	2046 Jul 18 (Saros 120)	2057 Jun 17 (Saros 121)	2068 May 17 (Saros 122)	2079 Apr 16 (Saros 123)
2090 Mar 15 (Saros 124)	2101 Feb 14 (Saros 125)	2112 Jan 14 (Saros 126)	2122 Dec 13 (Saros 127)	2133 Nov 12 (Saros 128)
2144 Oct 11 (Saros 129)	2155 Sep 11 (Saros 130)	2166 Aug 11 (Saros 131)	2177 Jul 11 (Saros 132)	2188 Jun 09 (Saros 133)
2199 May 10 (Saros 134)

=== Inex series ===
This eclipse is a part of the long period inex cycle, repeating at alternating nodes, every 358 synodic months (≈ 10,571.95 days, or 29 years minus 20 days). Their appearance and longitude are irregular due to a lack of synchronization with the anomalistic month (period of perigee). However, groupings of 3 inex cycles (≈ 87 years minus 2 months) comes close (≈ 1,151.02 anomalistic months), so eclipses are similar in these groupings.

Series members between 1801 and 2200
1807 May 21 (Saros 108)	1836 May 01 (Saros 109)	1865 Apr 11 (Saros 110)
1894 Mar 21 (Saros 111)	1923 Mar 03 (Saros 112)	1952 Feb 11 (Saros 113)
1981 Jan 20 (Saros 114)	2009 Dec 31 (Saros 115)	2038 Dec 11 (Saros 116)
2067 Nov 21 (Saros 117)	2096 Oct 31 (Saros 118)	2125 Oct 12 (Saros 119)
2154 Sep 21 (Saros 120)	2183 Sep 02 (Saros 121)	

=== Half-Saros cycle ===
A lunar eclipse will be preceded and followed by solar eclipses by 9 years and 5.5 days (a half saros). This lunar eclipse is related to two annular solar eclipses of Solar Saros 121.

January 16, 1972	January 26, 1990

== See also ==
- List of lunar eclipses
- List of 20th-century lunar eclipses
