= February 2035 lunar eclipse =

Astronomical event

- Penumbral eclipse
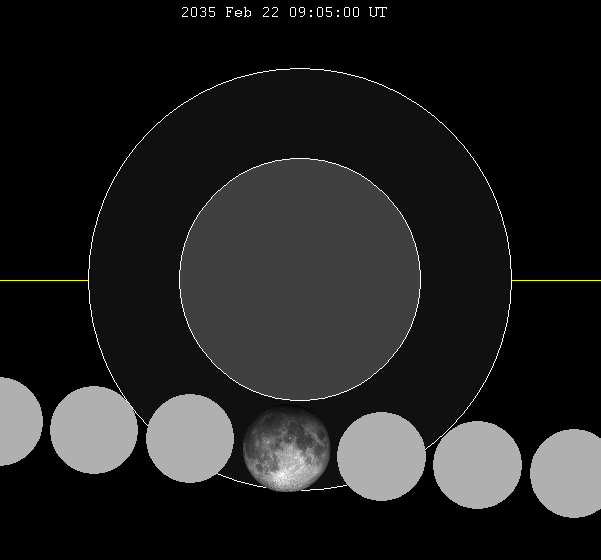
- The Moon's hourly motion shown right to left
- Date: February 22, 2035
- Gamma: −1.0357
- Magnitude: −0.0523
- Saros cycle: 114 (60 of 71)
- Penumbral: 255 minutes, 42 seconds
Contacts (UTC)
- P1: 6:58:21
- Greatest: 9:06:12
- P4: 11:14:03

A penumbral lunar eclipse will occur at the Moon’s ascending node of orbit on Thursday, February 22, 2035, with an umbral magnitude of −0.0523. A lunar eclipse occurs when the Moon moves into the Earth's shadow, causing the Moon to be darkened. A penumbral lunar eclipse occurs when part or all of the Moon's near side passes into the Earth's penumbra. Unlike a solar eclipse, which can only be viewed from a relatively small area of the world, a lunar eclipse may be viewed from anywhere on the night side of Earth. Occurring about 4.3 days after perigee (on February 18, 2035, at 0:40 UTC), the Moon's apparent diameter will be larger.

== Visibility ==
The eclipse will be completely visible over northeast Asia and North America, seen rising over east Asia and Australia and setting over South America.

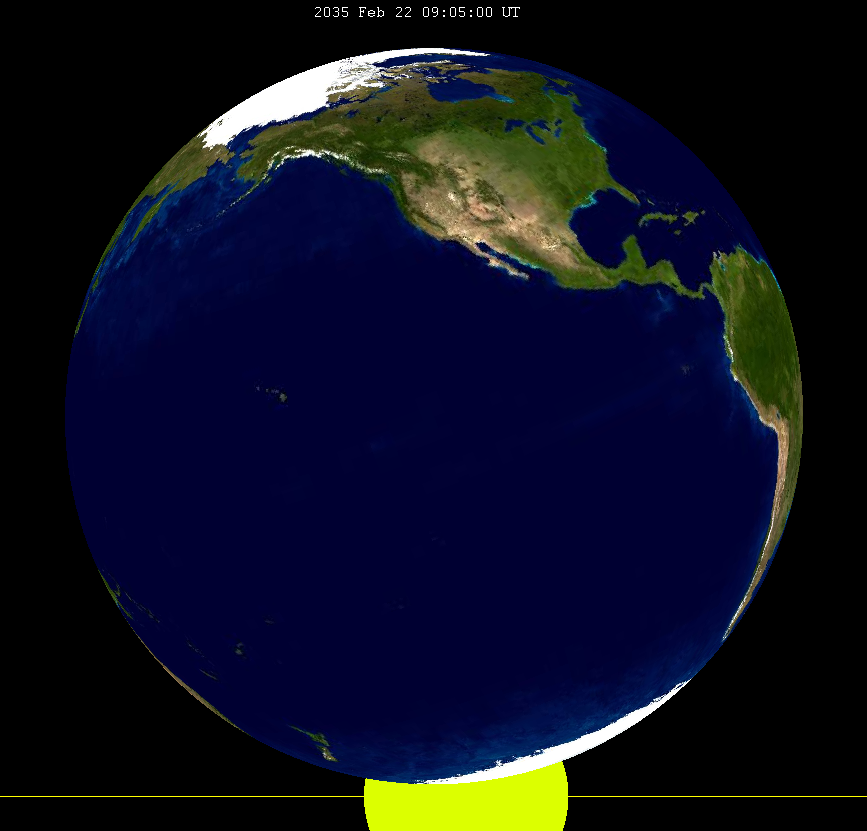
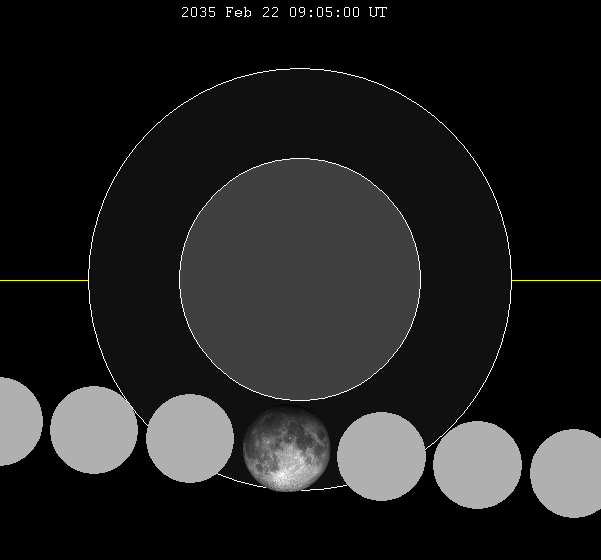

== Eclipse details ==
Shown below is a table displaying details about this particular solar eclipse. It describes various parameters pertaining to this eclipse.

February 22, 2035 Lunar Eclipse Parameters
Parameter	Value
Penumbral Magnitude	0.96629
Umbral Magnitude	−0.05232
Gamma	−1.03672
Sun Right Ascension	22h21m54.2s
Sun Declination	-10°11'53.9"
Sun Semi-Diameter	16'10.2"
Sun Equatorial Horizontal Parallax	08.9"
Moon Right Ascension	10h20m48.3s
Moon Declination	+09°13'43.5"
Moon Semi-Diameter	15'52.5"
Moon Equatorial Horizontal Parallax	0°58'15.8"
ΔT	76.5 s

== Eclipse season ==
This eclipse is part of an eclipse season, a period, roughly every six months, when eclipses occur. Only two (or occasionally three) eclipse seasons occur each year, and each season lasts about 35 days and repeats just short of six months (173 days) later; thus two full eclipse seasons always occur each year. Either two or three eclipses happen each eclipse season. In the sequence below, each eclipse is separated by a fortnight.

Eclipse season of February–March 2035
February 22 Ascending node (full moon)	March 9 Descending node (new moon)
Penumbral lunar eclipse Lunar Saros 114	Annular solar eclipse Solar Saros 140

== Related eclipses ==
=== Eclipses in 2035 ===
- A penumbral lunar eclipse on February 22.
- An annular solar eclipse on March 9.
- A partial lunar eclipse on August 19.
- A total solar eclipse on September 2.

=== Metonic ===
- Preceded by: Lunar eclipse of May 7, 2031
- Followed by: Lunar eclipse of December 11, 2038

=== Tzolkinex ===
- Preceded by: Lunar eclipse of January 12, 2028
- Followed by: Lunar eclipse of April 5, 2042

=== Half-Saros ===
- Preceded by: Solar eclipse of February 17, 2026
- Followed by: Solar eclipse of February 28, 2044

=== Tritos ===
- Preceded by: Lunar eclipse of March 25, 2024
- Followed by: Lunar eclipse of January 22, 2046

=== Lunar Saros 114 ===
- Preceded by: Lunar eclipse of February 11, 2017
- Followed by: Lunar eclipse of March 4, 2053

=== Inex ===
- Preceded by: Lunar eclipse of March 14, 2006
- Followed by: Lunar eclipse of February 2, 2064

=== Triad ===
- Preceded by: Lunar eclipse of April 23, 1948
- Followed by: Lunar eclipse of December 24, 2121

=== Lunar eclipses of 2035–2038 ===
This eclipse is a member of a semester series. An eclipse in a semester series of lunar eclipses repeats approximately every 177 days and 4 hours (a semester) at alternating nodes of the Moon's orbit.

The penumbral lunar eclipses on June 17, 2038 and December 11, 2038 occur in the next lunar year eclipse set.

Lunar eclipse series sets from 2035 to 2038
Ascending node				Descending node			
Saros	Date Viewing	Type Chart	Gamma	Saros	Date Viewing	Type Chart	Gamma
114	2035 Feb 22	Penumbral	−1.0357	119	2035 Aug 19	Partial	0.9433
124	2036 Feb 11	Total	−0.3110	129	2036 Aug 07	Total	0.2004
134	2037 Jan 31	Total	0.3619	139	2037 Jul 27	Partial	−0.5582
144	2038 Jan 21	Penumbral	1.0710	149	2038 Jul 16	Penumbral	−1.2837

=== Saros 114 ===
This eclipse is a part of Saros series 114, repeating every 18 years, 11 days, and containing 71 events. The series started with a penumbral lunar eclipse on May 13, 971 AD. It contains partial eclipses from August 7, 1115 through February 18, 1440; total eclipses from February 28, 1458 through July 17, 1674; and a second set of partial eclipses from July 28, 1692 through November 26, 1890. The series ends at member 71 as a penumbral eclipse on June 22, 2233.

The longest duration of totality was produced by member 35 at 106 minutes, 5 seconds on May 24, 1584. All eclipses in this series occur at the Moon’s ascending node of orbit.

Greatest	First			
The greatest eclipse of the series occurred on 1584 May 24, lasting 106 minutes, 5 seconds.	Penumbral	Partial	Total	Central
The greatest eclipse of the series occurred on 1584 May 24, lasting 106 minutes, 5 seconds.	971 May 13	1115 Aug 07	1458 Feb 28	1530 Apr 12
The greatest eclipse of the series occurred on 1584 May 24, lasting 106 minutes, 5 seconds.	Last			
The greatest eclipse of the series occurred on 1584 May 24, lasting 106 minutes, 5 seconds.	Central	Total	Partial	Penumbral
The greatest eclipse of the series occurred on 1584 May 24, lasting 106 minutes, 5 seconds.	1638 Jun 26	1674 Jul 17	1890 Nov 26	2233 Jun 22

Eclipses are tabulated in three columns; every third eclipse in the same column is one exeligmos apart, so they all cast shadows over approximately the same parts of the Earth.

Series members 48–69 occur between 1801 and 2200:
48	49	50
1818 Oct 14	1836 Oct 24	1854 Nov 04
51	52	53
1872 Nov 15	1890 Nov 26	1908 Dec 07
54	55	56
1926 Dec 19	1944 Dec 29	1963 Jan 09
57	58	59
1981 Jan 20	1999 Jan 31	2017 Feb 11
60	61	62
2035 Feb 22	2053 Mar 04	2071 Mar 16
63	64	65
2089 Mar 26	2107 Apr 07	2125 Apr 18
66	67	68
2143 Apr 29	2161 May 09	2179 May 21
69
2197 May 31

=== Tritos series ===
This eclipse is a part of a tritos cycle, repeating at alternating nodes every 135 synodic months (≈ 3986.63 days, or 11 years minus 1 month). Their appearance and longitude are irregular due to a lack of synchronization with the anomalistic month (period of perigee), but groupings of 3 tritos cycles (≈ 33 years minus 3 months) come close (≈ 434.044 anomalistic months), so eclipses are similar in these groupings.

Series members between 1904 and 2200
1904 Mar 02 (Saros 102)	1915 Jan 31 (Saros 103)			
	1969 Aug 27 (Saros 108)	1980 Jul 27 (Saros 109)	1991 Jun 27 (Saros 110)	2002 May 26 (Saros 111)
2013 Apr 25 (Saros 112)	2024 Mar 25 (Saros 113)	2035 Feb 22 (Saros 114)	2046 Jan 22 (Saros 115)	2056 Dec 22 (Saros 116)
2067 Nov 21 (Saros 117)	2078 Oct 21 (Saros 118)	2089 Sep 19 (Saros 119)	2100 Aug 19 (Saros 120)	2111 Jul 21 (Saros 121)
2122 Jun 20 (Saros 122)	2133 May 19 (Saros 123)	2144 Apr 18 (Saros 124)	2155 Mar 19 (Saros 125)	2166 Feb 15 (Saros 126)
2177 Jan 14 (Saros 127)	2187 Dec 15 (Saros 128)	2198 Nov 13 (Saros 129)		

=== Inex series ===
This eclipse is a part of the long period inex cycle, repeating at alternating nodes, every 358 synodic months (≈ 10,571.95 days, or 29 years minus 20 days). Their appearance and longitude are irregular due to a lack of synchronization with the anomalistic month (period of perigee). However, groupings of 3 inex cycles (≈ 87 years minus 2 months) comes close (≈ 1,151.02 anomalistic months), so eclipses are similar in these groupings.

Series members between 1801 and 2200
1803 Aug 03 (Saros 106)	1832 Jul 12 (Saros 107)	1861 Jun 22 (Saros 108)
1890 Jun 03 (Saros 109)	1919 May 15 (Saros 110)	1948 Apr 23 (Saros 111)
1977 Apr 04 (Saros 112)	2006 Mar 14 (Saros 113)	2035 Feb 22 (Saros 114)
2064 Feb 02 (Saros 115)	2093 Jan 12 (Saros 116)	2121 Dec 24 (Saros 117)
2150 Dec 04 (Saros 118)	2179 Nov 14 (Saros 119)	

=== Half-Saros cycle ===
A lunar eclipse will be preceded and followed by solar eclipses by 9 years and 5.5 days (a half saros). This lunar eclipse is related to two total solar eclipses of Solar Saros 121.

February 17, 2026	February 28, 2044

== See also ==
- List of lunar eclipses and List of 21st-century lunar eclipses
