= 2017 eclipse =

Four eclipses occurred during 2017:

- Solar eclipses
  - Solar eclipse of February 26, 2017; annular
  - Solar eclipse of August 21, 2017; total
- Lunar eclipses
  - February 2017 lunar eclipse; penumbral
  - August 2017 lunar eclipse; umbral

== See also ==
- Mitsubishi Eclipse Cross, a vehicle
