= 2024 eclipse =

2024 eclipse may refer to:

- March 2024 lunar eclipse, a penumbral eclipse
- Solar eclipse of April 8, 2024, a total eclipse in parts of Mexico, the United States and Canada
- September 2024 lunar eclipse, a partial eclipse
- Solar eclipse of October 2, 2024, an annular eclipse in parts of the Pacific
