= February 2017 lunar eclipse =

Penumbral lunar eclipse 11 February 2017

- Penumbral eclipse
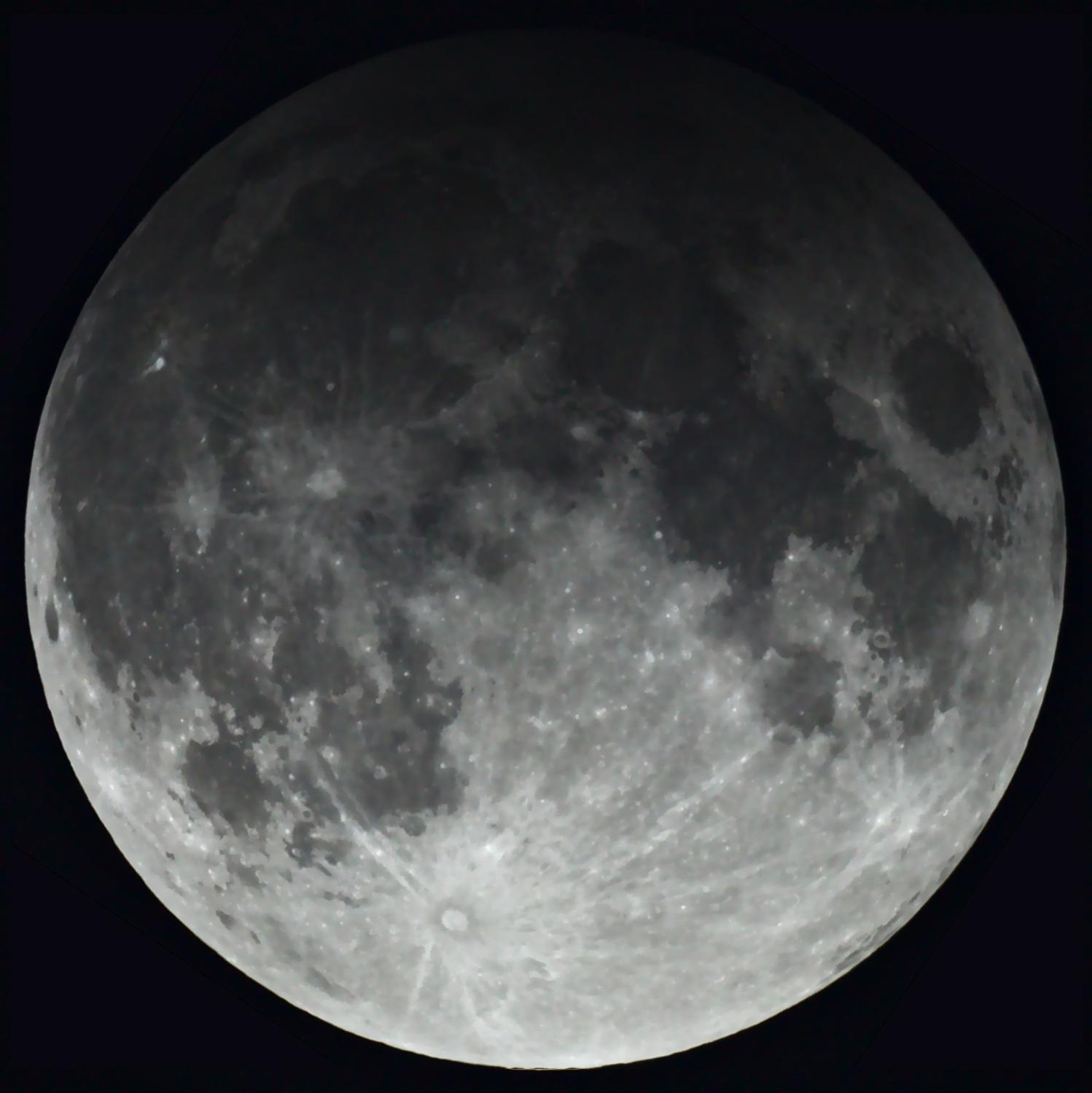
- Penumbral eclipse as viewed from Rabka-Zdrój, Poland, 0:51 UTC
- Date: February 11, 2017
- Gamma: −1.0254
- Magnitude: −0.0342
- Saros cycle: 114 (59 of 71)
- Penumbral: 259 minutes, 10 seconds
Contacts (UTC)
- P1: 22:34:16
- Greatest: 0:43:53
- P4: 2:53:26

A penumbral lunar eclipse occurred at the Moon's ascending node of orbit on Saturday, February 11, 2017, with an umbral magnitude of −0.0342. It was not quite a total penumbral lunar eclipse. A lunar eclipse occurs when the Moon moves into the Earth's shadow, causing the Moon to be darkened. A penumbral lunar eclipse occurs when part or all of the Moon's near side passes into the Earth's penumbra. Unlike a solar eclipse, which can only be viewed from a relatively small area of the world, a lunar eclipse may be viewed from anywhere on the night side of Earth. Occurring about 4.6 days before perigee (on February 6, 2017, at 9:00 UTC), the Moon's apparent diameter was larger.

This eclipse occurred the same day as comet 45P/Honda–Mrkos–Pajdušáková made a close approach to Earth (0.08318 AU). It also occurred on the Lantern Festival, the first eclipse to do so since February 9, 2009.

== Visibility ==
The eclipse was completely visible over northeastern North America, eastern South America, Europe, Africa, and west Asia, seen rising over much of North America and western South America and setting over south and east Asia.

| Hourly motion shown right to left |
Visibility map

== Gallery ==
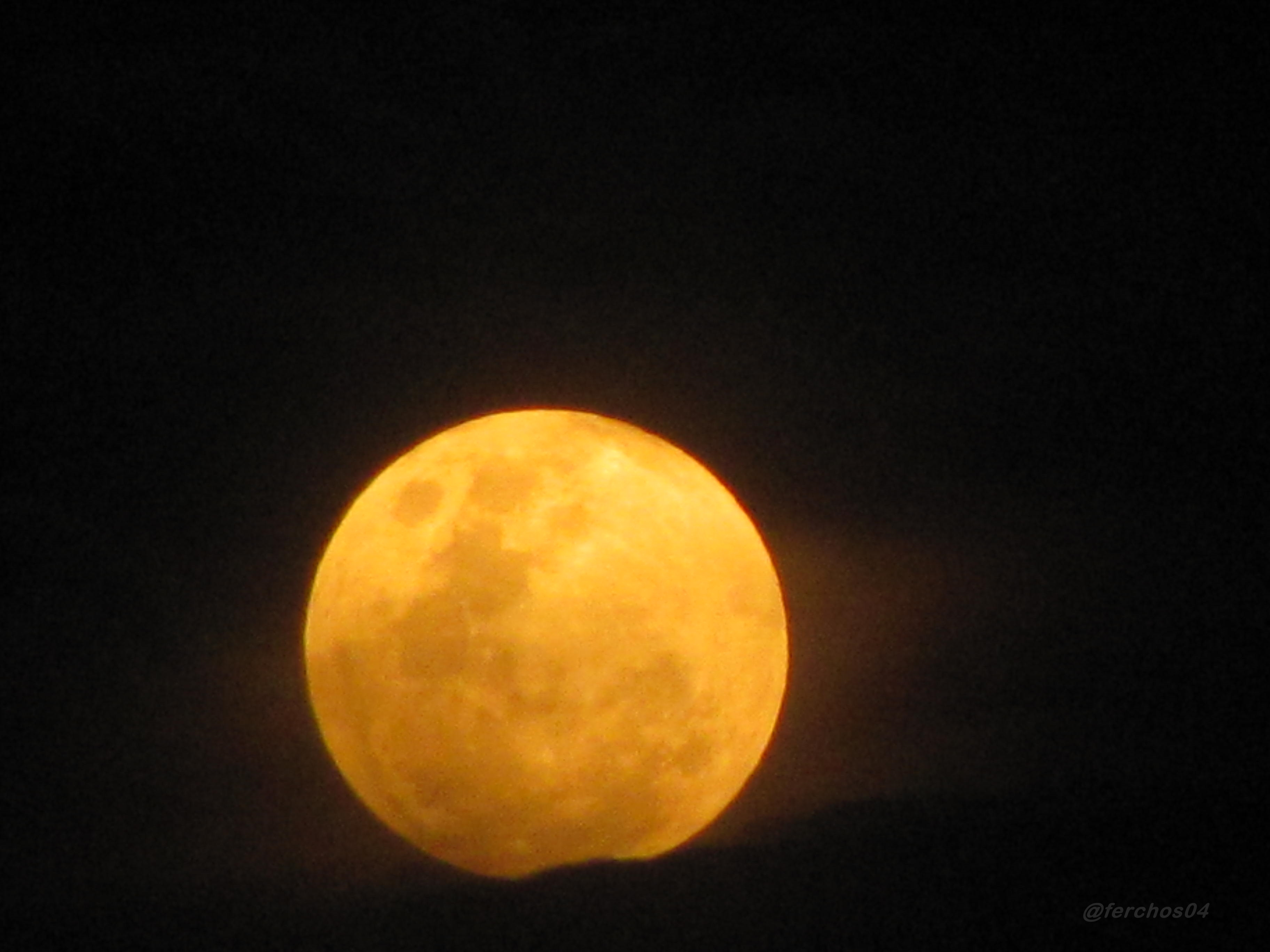
Popayán, Colombia, 23:43 UTC (10 February)

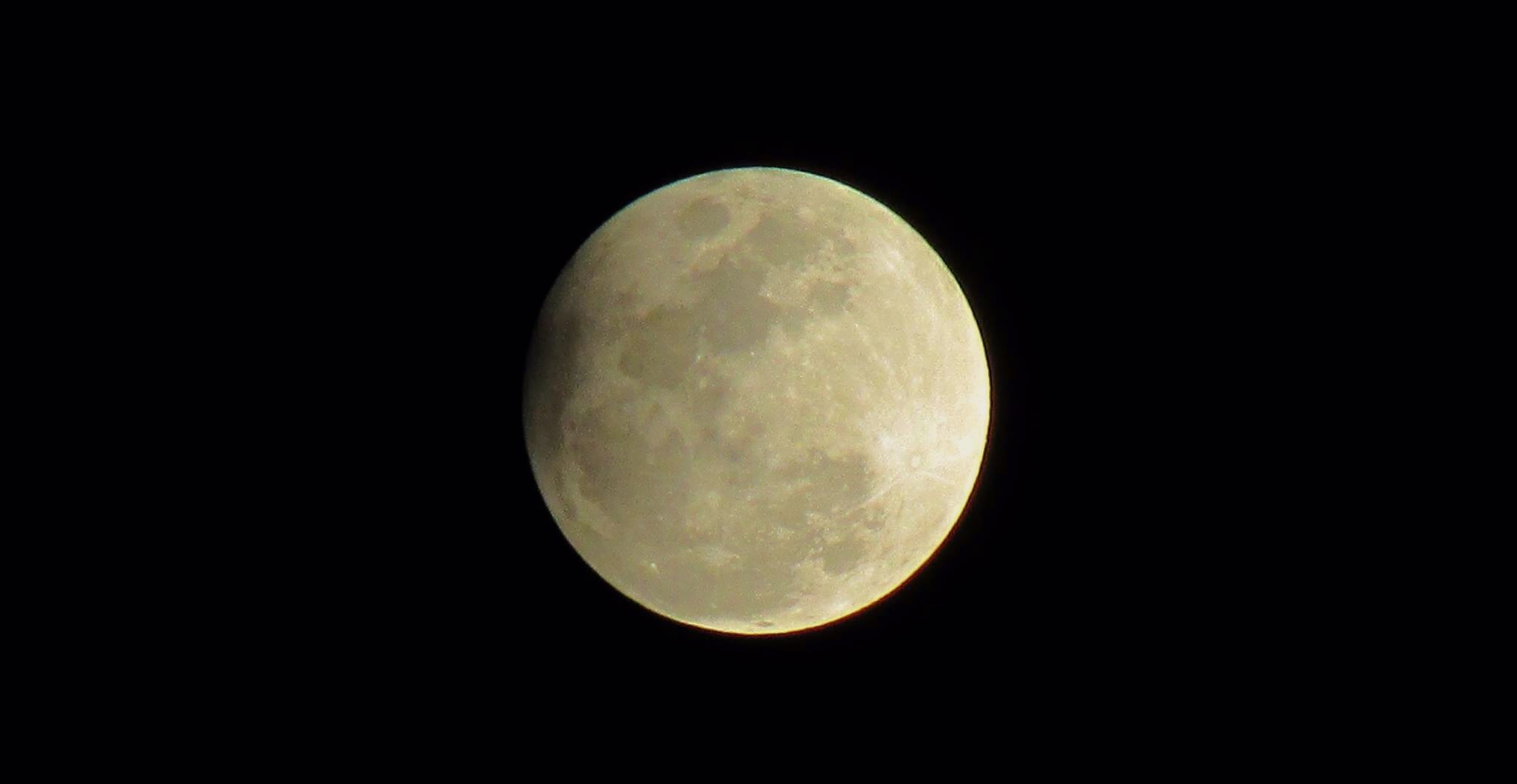
Kissimmee, Florida, 0:00 UTC

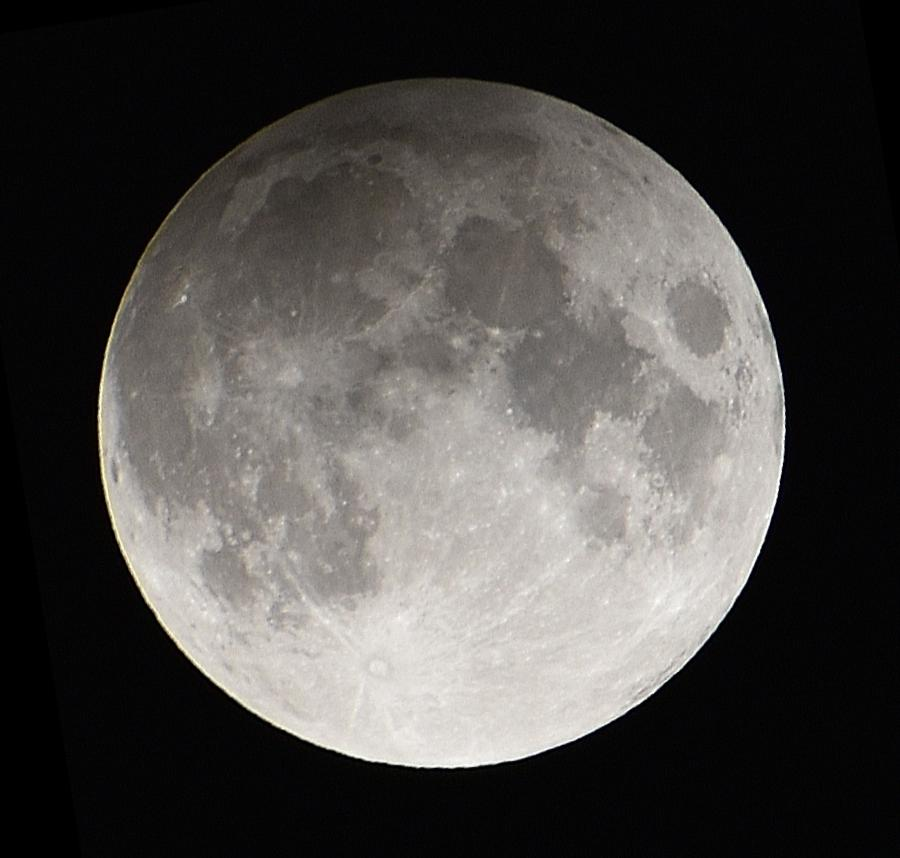
Tampa, Florida, 0:11 UTC

Time lapse images from Melbourne, Florida

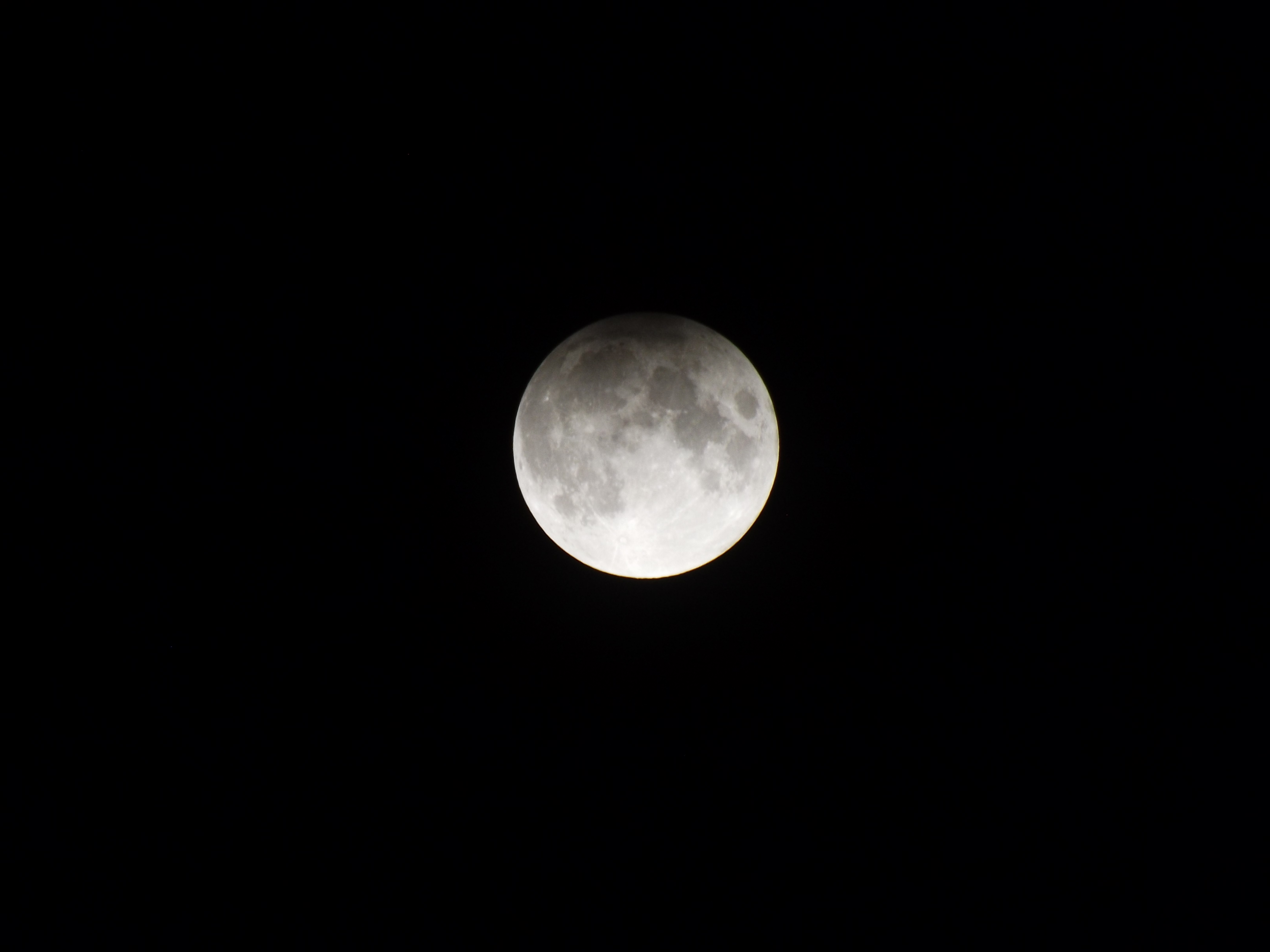
Bracciano, Italy, 0:29 UTC

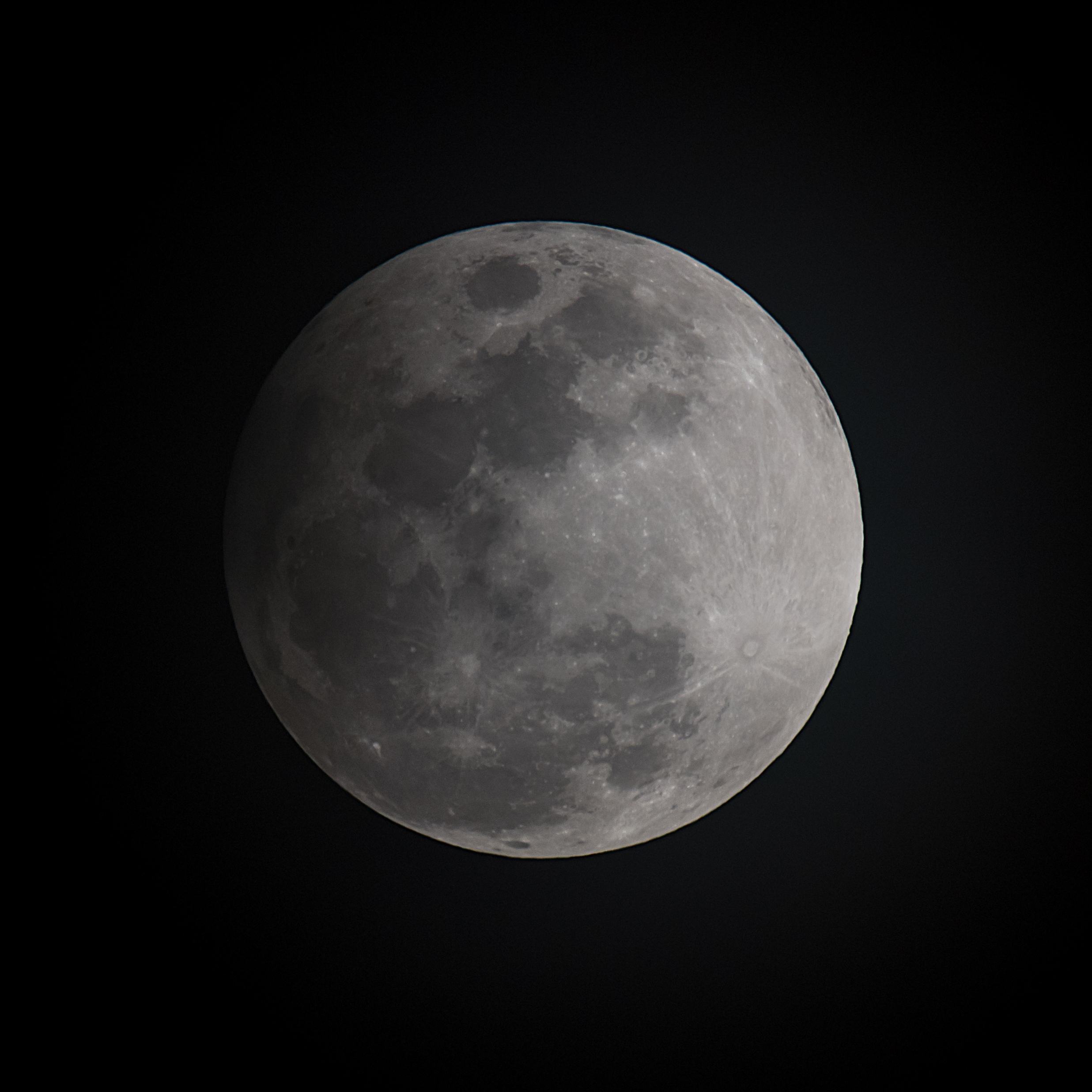
Macon, Georgia, 0:38 UTC

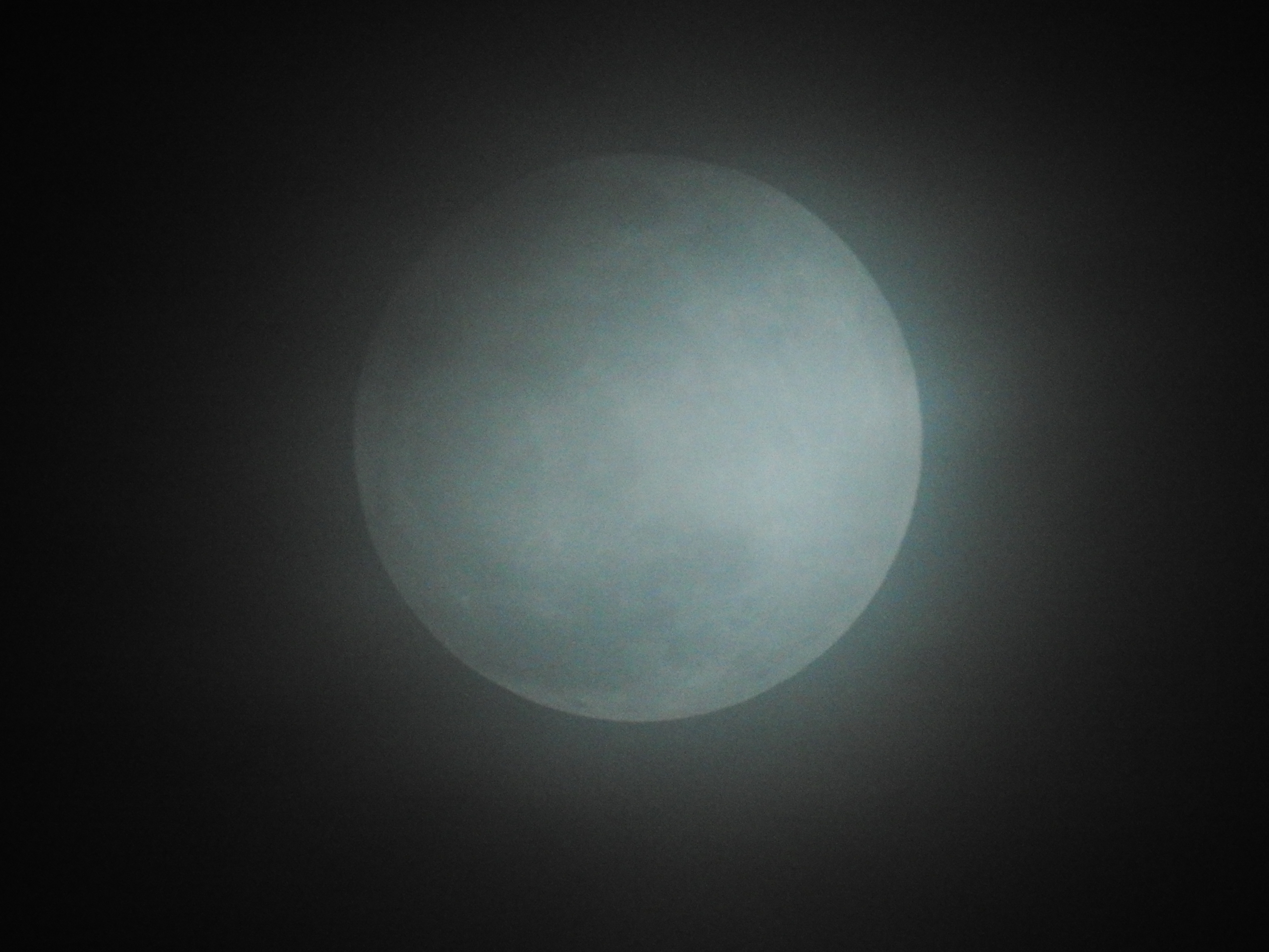
Naperville, Illinois, 1:23 UTC

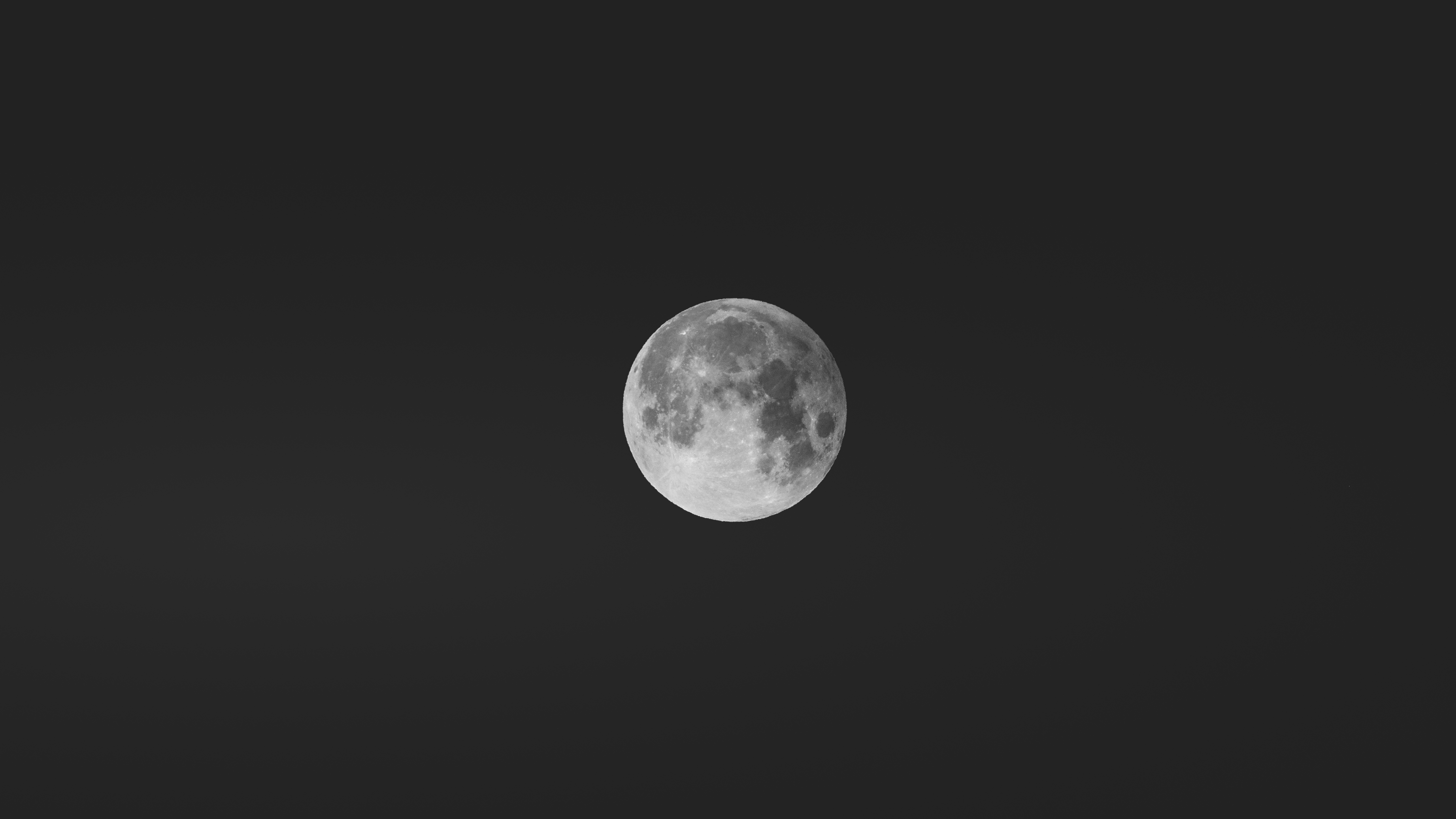
Innsbruck, Austria, ~2:00 UTC

== Eclipse details ==
Shown below is a table displaying details about this particular lunar eclipse. It describes various parameters pertaining to this eclipse.

February 11, 2017 Lunar Eclipse Parameters
| Parameter | Value |
|---|---|
| Penumbral Magnitude | 0.98956 |
| Umbral Magnitude | −0.03421 |
| Gamma | −1.02548 |
| Sun Right Ascension | 21h39m19.2s |
| Sun Declination | -14°01'07.8" |
| Sun Semi-Diameter | 16'12.3" |
| Sun Equatorial Horizontal Parallax | 08.9" |
| Moon Right Ascension | 09h38m22.6s |
| Moon Declination | +13°03'10.2" |
| Moon Semi-Diameter | 15'49.8" |
| Moon Equatorial Horizontal Parallax | 0°58'05.6" |
| ΔT | 68.3 s |

== Eclipse season ==
This eclipse is part of an eclipse season, a period, roughly every six months, when eclipses occur. Only two (or occasionally three) eclipse seasons occur each year, and each season lasts about 35 days and repeats just short of six months (173 days) later; thus two full eclipse seasons always occur each year. Either two or three eclipses happen each eclipse season. In the sequence below, each eclipse is separated by a fortnight.

Eclipse season of February 2017
| February 11 Ascending node (full moon) | February 26 Descending node (new moon) |
|---|---|
| Penumbral lunar eclipse Lunar Saros 114 | Annular solar eclipse Solar Saros 140 |

== Related eclipses ==
=== Eclipses in 2017 ===
- A penumbral lunar eclipse on February 11.
- An annular solar eclipse on February 26.
- A partial lunar eclipse on August 7.
- A total solar eclipse on August 21.

=== Metonic ===
- Preceded by: Lunar eclipse of April 25, 2013
- Followed by: Lunar eclipse of November 30, 2020

=== Tzolkinex ===
- Preceded by: Lunar eclipse of December 31, 2009
- Followed by: Lunar eclipse of March 25, 2024

=== Half-Saros ===
- Preceded by: Solar eclipse of February 7, 2008
- Followed by: Solar eclipse of February 17, 2026

=== Tritos ===
- Preceded by: Lunar eclipse of March 14, 2006
- Followed by: Lunar eclipse of January 12, 2028

=== Lunar Saros 114 ===
- Preceded by: Lunar eclipse of January 31, 1999
- Followed by: Lunar eclipse of February 22, 2035

=== Inex ===
- Preceded by: Lunar eclipse of March 3, 1988
- Followed by: Lunar eclipse of January 22, 2046

=== Triad ===
- Preceded by: Lunar eclipse of April 13, 1930
- Followed by: Lunar eclipse of December 13, 2103

=== Lunar eclipses of 2016–2020 ===
This eclipse is a member of a semester series. An eclipse in a semester series of lunar eclipses repeats approximately every 177 days and 4 hours (a semester) at alternating nodes of the Moon's orbit.

The penumbral lunar eclipses on March 23, 2016 and September 16, 2016 occur in the previous lunar year eclipse set, and the penumbral lunar eclipses on June 5, 2020 and November 30, 2020 occur in the next lunar year eclipse set.

Lunar eclipse series sets from 2016 to 2020
| Descending node | | | | Ascending node | | | |
| Saros | Date Viewing | Type Chart | Gamma | Saros | Date Viewing | Type Chart | Gamma |
| 109 | 2016 Aug 18 | Penumbral | 1.5641 | 114 | 2017 Feb 11 | Penumbral | −1.0255 |
| 119 | 2017 Aug 07 | Partial | 0.8669 | 124 | 2018 Jan 31 | Total | −0.3014 |
| 129 | 2018 Jul 27 | Total | 0.1168 | 134 | 2019 Jan 21 | Total | 0.3684 |
| 139 | 2019 Jul 16 | Partial | −0.6430 | 144 | 2020 Jan 10 | Penumbral | 1.0727 |
| 149 | 2020 Jul 05 | Penumbral | −1.3639 | | | | |

=== Saros 114 ===
This eclipse is a part of Saros series 114, repeating every 18 years, 11 days, and containing 71 events. The series started with a penumbral lunar eclipse on May 13, 971 AD. It contains partial eclipses from August 7, 1115 through February 18, 1440; total eclipses from February 28, 1458 through July 17, 1674; and a second set of partial eclipses from July 28, 1692 through November 26, 1890. The series ends at member 71 as a penumbral eclipse on June 22, 2233.

The longest duration of totality was produced by member 35 at 106 minutes, 5 seconds on May 24, 1584. All eclipses in this series occur at the Moon’s ascending node of orbit.

| Greatest | First | | | |
|---|---|---|---|---|
| The greatest eclipse of the series occurred on 1584 May 24, lasting 106 minutes, 5 seconds. | Penumbral | Partial | Total | Central |
| The greatest eclipse of the series occurred on 1584 May 24, lasting 106 minutes, 5 seconds. | 971 May 13 | 1115 Aug 07 | 1458 Feb 28 | 1530 Apr 12 |
| The greatest eclipse of the series occurred on 1584 May 24, lasting 106 minutes, 5 seconds. | Last | | | |
| The greatest eclipse of the series occurred on 1584 May 24, lasting 106 minutes, 5 seconds. | Central | Total | Partial | Penumbral |
| The greatest eclipse of the series occurred on 1584 May 24, lasting 106 minutes, 5 seconds. | 1638 Jun 26 | 1674 Jul 17 | 1890 Nov 26 | 2233 Jun 22 |

Eclipses are tabulated in three columns; every third eclipse in the same column is one exeligmos apart, so they all cast shadows over approximately the same parts of the Earth.

Series members 48–69 occur between 1801 and 2200:
| 48 | 49 | 50 |
|---|---|---|
| 1818 Oct 14 | 1836 Oct 24 | 1854 Nov 04 |
| 51 | 52 | 53 |
| 1872 Nov 15 | 1890 Nov 26 | 1908 Dec 07 |
| 54 | 55 | 56 |
| 1926 Dec 19 | 1944 Dec 29 | 1963 Jan 09 |
| 57 | 58 | 59 |
| 1981 Jan 20 | 1999 Jan 31 | 2017 Feb 11 |
| 60 | 61 | 62 |
| 2035 Feb 22 | 2053 Mar 04 | 2071 Mar 16 |
| 63 | 64 | 65 |
| 2089 Mar 26 | 2107 Apr 07 | 2125 Apr 18 |
| 66 | 67 | 68 |
| 2143 Apr 29 | 2161 May 09 | 2179 May 21 |
69
2197 May 31

=== Tritos series ===
This eclipse is a part of a tritos cycle, repeating at alternating nodes every 135 synodic months (≈ 3986.63 days, or 11 years minus 1 month). Their appearance and longitude are irregular due to a lack of synchronization with the anomalistic month (period of perigee), but groupings of 3 tritos cycles (≈ 33 years minus 3 months) come close (≈ 434.044 anomalistic months), so eclipses are similar in these groupings.

Series members between 1886 and 2200
| 1886 Feb 18 (Saros 102) | 1897 Jan 18 (Saros 103) | | | |
| | 1951 Aug 17 (Saros 108) | 1962 Jul 17 (Saros 109) | 1973 Jun 15 (Saros 110) | 1984 May 15 (Saros 111) |
| 1995 Apr 15 (Saros 112) | 2006 Mar 14 (Saros 113) | 2017 Feb 11 (Saros 114) | 2028 Jan 12 (Saros 115) | 2038 Dec 11 (Saros 116) |
| 2049 Nov 09 (Saros 117) | 2060 Oct 09 (Saros 118) | 2071 Sep 09 (Saros 119) | 2082 Aug 08 (Saros 120) | 2093 Jul 08 (Saros 121) |
| 2104 Jun 08 (Saros 122) | 2115 May 08 (Saros 123) | 2126 Apr 07 (Saros 124) | 2137 Mar 07 (Saros 125) | 2148 Feb 04 (Saros 126) |
| 2159 Jan 04 (Saros 127) | 2169 Dec 04 (Saros 128) | 2180 Nov 02 (Saros 129) | 2191 Oct 02 (Saros 130) | |

=== Inex series ===
This eclipse is a part of the long period inex cycle, repeating at alternating nodes, every 358 synodic months (≈ 10,571.95 days, or 29 years minus 20 days). Their appearance and longitude are irregular due to a lack of synchronization with the anomalistic month (period of perigee). However, groupings of 3 inex cycles (≈ 87 years minus 2 months) comes close (≈ 1,151.02 anomalistic months), so eclipses are similar in these groupings.

Series members between 1801 and 2200
| 1814 Jul 02 (Saros 107) | 1843 Jun 12 (Saros 108) | 1872 May 22 (Saros 109) |
| 1901 May 03 (Saros 110) | 1930 Apr 13 (Saros 111) | 1959 Mar 24 (Saros 112) |
| 1988 Mar 03 (Saros 113) | 2017 Feb 11 (Saros 114) | 2046 Jan 22 (Saros 115) |
| 2075 Jan 02 (Saros 116) | 2103 Dec 13 (Saros 117) | 2132 Nov 23 (Saros 118) |
| 2161 Nov 03 (Saros 119) | 2190 Oct 13 (Saros 120) | |

=== Half-Saros cycle ===
A lunar eclipse will be preceded and followed by solar eclipses by 9 years and 5.5 days (a half saros). This lunar eclipse is related to two annular solar eclipses of Solar Saros 121.

| February 7, 2008 | February 17, 2026 |

== See also ==
- List of lunar eclipses and List of 21st-century lunar eclipses
