= April 2042 lunar eclipse =

Astronomical event

- Penumbral eclipse
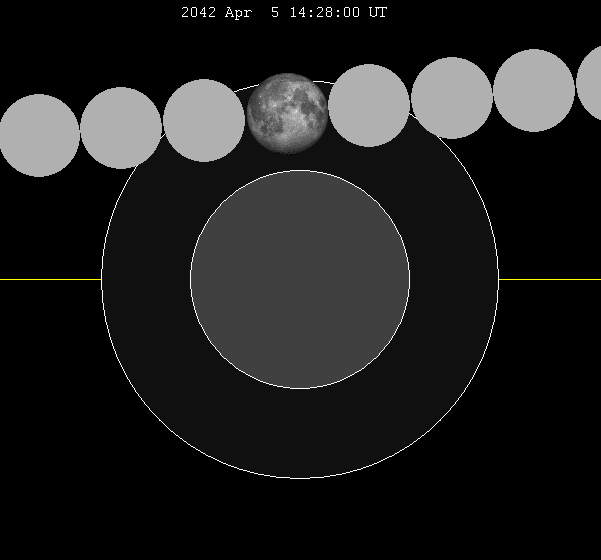
- The Moon's hourly motion shown right to left
- Date: April 5, 2042
- Gamma: 1.1080
- Magnitude: −0.2156
- Saros cycle: 113 (65 of 71)
- Penumbral: 268 minutes, 27 seconds
Contacts (UTC)
- P1: 12:14:31
- Greatest: 14:28:45
- P4: 16:42:58

A penumbral lunar eclipse will occur at the Moon’s descending node of orbit on Saturday, April 5, 2042, with an umbral magnitude of −0.2156. A lunar eclipse occurs when the Moon moves into the Earth's shadow, causing the Moon to be darkened. A penumbral lunar eclipse occurs when part or all of the Moon's near side passes into the Earth's penumbra. Unlike a solar eclipse, which can only be viewed from a relatively small area of the world, a lunar eclipse may be viewed from anywhere on the night side of Earth. Occurring about 1.6 days after apogee (on April 4, 2042, at 1:50 UTC), the Moon's apparent diameter will be smaller.

It will occur on Easter Sunday (Gregorian only), the only such case for an eclipse between April 2015 and April 2164.

== Visibility ==
The eclipse will be completely visible over east Asia and Australia, seen rising over east Africa and west and central Asia and setting over western North America.

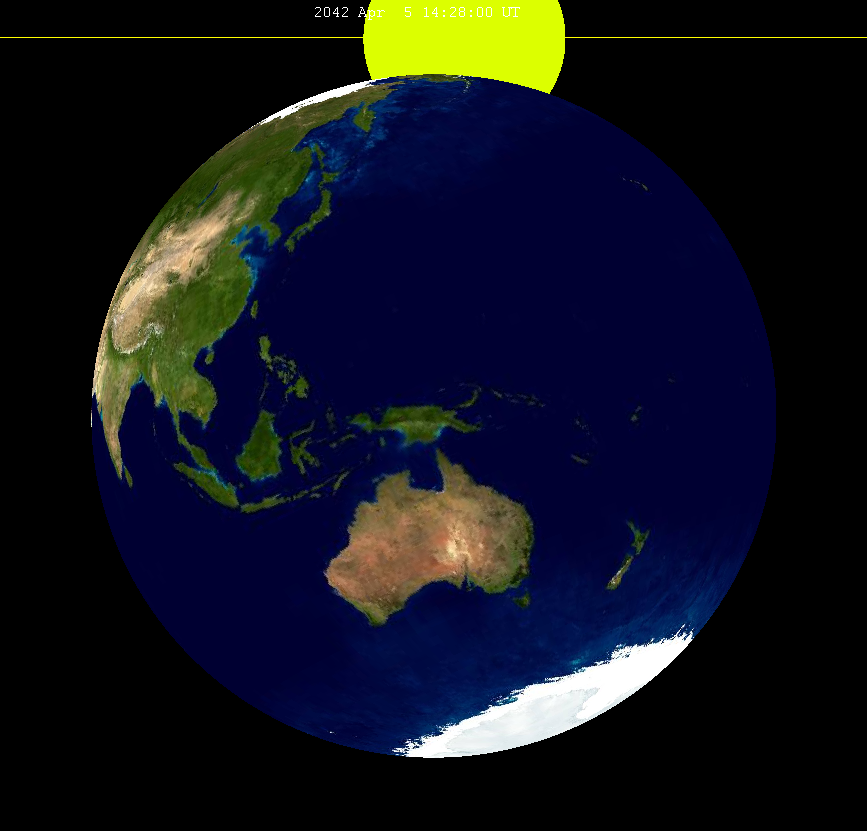
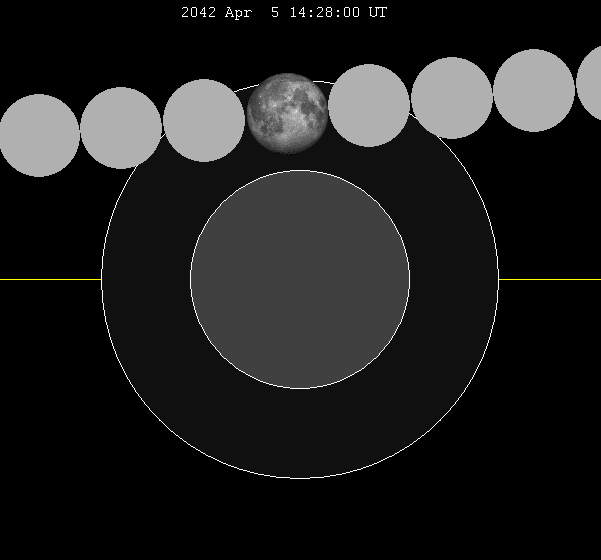

== Eclipse details ==
Shown below is a table displaying details about this particular eclipse. It describes various parameters pertaining to this eclipse.

April 5, 2042 Lunar Eclipse Parameters
| Parameter | Value |
|---|---|
| Penumbral Magnitude | 0.87002 |
| Umbral Magnitude | −0.21557 |
| Gamma | 1.10805 |
| Sun Right Ascension | 00h58m43.2s |
| Sun Declination | +06°16'08.8" |
| Sun Semi-Diameter | 15'59.3" |
| Sun Equatorial Horizontal Parallax | 08.8" |
| Moon Right Ascension | 13h00m37.2s |
| Moon Declination | -05°23'23.8" |
| Moon Semi-Diameter | 14'43.6" |
| Moon Equatorial Horizontal Parallax | 0°54'03.0" |
| ΔT | 80.4 s |

== Eclipse season ==
This eclipse is part of an eclipse season, a period, roughly every six months, when eclipses occur. Only two (or occasionally three) eclipse seasons occur each year, and each season lasts about 35 days and repeats just short of six months (173 days) later; thus two full eclipse seasons always occur each year. Either two or three eclipses happen each eclipse season. In the sequence below, each eclipse is separated by a fortnight.

Eclipse season of April 2042
| April 5 Descending node (full moon) | April 20 Ascending node (new moon) |
|---|---|
| Penumbral lunar eclipse Lunar Saros 113 | Total solar eclipse Solar Saros 139 |

== Related eclipses ==
=== Eclipses in 2042 ===
- A penumbral lunar eclipse on April 5.
- A total solar eclipse on April 20.
- A penumbral lunar eclipse on September 29.
- An annular solar eclipse on October 14.
- A penumbral lunar eclipse on October 28.

=== Metonic ===
- Preceded by: Lunar eclipse of June 17, 2038
- Followed by: Lunar eclipse of January 22, 2046

=== Tzolkinex ===
- Preceded by: Lunar eclipse of February 22, 2035
- Followed by: Lunar eclipse of May 17, 2049

=== Half-Saros ===
- Preceded by: Solar eclipse of March 30, 2033
- Followed by: Solar eclipse of April 11, 2051

=== Tritos ===
- Preceded by: Lunar eclipse of May 7, 2031
- Followed by: Lunar eclipse of March 4, 2053

=== Lunar Saros 113 ===
- Preceded by: Lunar eclipse of March 25, 2024
- Followed by: Lunar eclipse of April 15, 2060

=== Inex ===
- Preceded by: Lunar eclipse of April 25, 2013
- Followed by: Lunar eclipse of March 16, 2071

=== Triad ===
- Preceded by: Lunar eclipse of June 5, 1955
- Followed by: Lunar eclipse of February 4, 2129

=== Lunar eclipses of 2042–2045 ===
This eclipse is a member of a semester series. An eclipse in a semester series of lunar eclipses repeats approximately every 177 days and 4 hours (a semester) at alternating nodes of the Moon's orbit.

The penumbral lunar eclipse on October 28, 2042 occurs in the previous lunar year eclipse set.

Lunar eclipse series sets from 2042 to 2045
| Descending node | | | | Ascending node | | | |
| Saros | Date Viewing | Type Chart | Gamma | Saros | Date Viewing | Type Chart | Gamma |
| 113 | 2042 Apr 05 | Penumbral | 1.1080 | 118 | 2042 Sep 29 | Penumbral | −1.0261 |
| 123 | 2043 Mar 25 | Total | 0.3849 | 128 | 2043 Sep 19 | Total | −0.3316 |
| 133 | 2044 Mar 13 | Total | −0.3496 | 138 | 2044 Sep 07 | Total | 0.4318 |
| 143 | 2045 Mar 03 | Penumbral | −1.0274 | 148 | 2045 Aug 27 | Penumbral | 1.2060 |

=== Saros 113 ===
This eclipse is a part of Saros series 113, repeating every 18 years, 11 days, and containing 71 events. The series started with a penumbral lunar eclipse on April 29, 888 AD. It contains partial eclipses from July 14, 1014 through March 10, 1411; total eclipses from March 20, 1429 through August 7, 1645; and a second set of partial eclipses from August 18, 1663 through February 21, 1970. The series ends at member 71 as a penumbral eclipse on June 10, 2150.

The longest duration of totality was produced by member 38 at 103 minutes, 6 seconds on June 5, 1555. All eclipses in this series occur at the Moon’s descending node of orbit.

| Greatest | First | | | |
|---|---|---|---|---|
| The greatest eclipse of the series occurred on 1555 Jun 05, lasting 103 minutes, 6 seconds. | Penumbral | Partial | Total | Central |
| The greatest eclipse of the series occurred on 1555 Jun 05, lasting 103 minutes, 6 seconds. | 888 Apr 29 | 1014 Jul 14 | 1429 Mar 20 | 1483 Apr 22 |
| The greatest eclipse of the series occurred on 1555 Jun 05, lasting 103 minutes, 6 seconds. | Last | | | |
| The greatest eclipse of the series occurred on 1555 Jun 05, lasting 103 minutes, 6 seconds. | Central | Total | Partial | Penumbral |
| The greatest eclipse of the series occurred on 1555 Jun 05, lasting 103 minutes, 6 seconds. | 1609 Jul 16 | 1645 Aug 07 | 1970 Feb 21 | 2150 Jun 10 |

Eclipses are tabulated in three columns; every third eclipse in the same column is one exeligmos apart, so they all cast shadows over approximately the same parts of the Earth.

Series members 52–71 occur between 1801 and 2150:
| 52 | 53 | 54 |
|---|---|---|
| 1807 Nov 15 | 1825 Nov 25 | 1843 Dec 07 |
| 55 | 56 | 57 |
| 1861 Dec 17 | 1879 Dec 28 | 1898 Jan 08 |
| 58 | 59 | 60 |
| 1916 Jan 20 | 1934 Jan 30 | 1952 Feb 11 |
| 61 | 62 | 63 |
| 1970 Feb 21 | 1988 Mar 03 | 2006 Mar 14 |
| 64 | 65 | 66 |
| 2024 Mar 25 | 2042 Apr 05 | 2060 Apr 15 |
| 67 | 68 | 69 |
| 2078 Apr 27 | 2096 May 07 | 2114 May 19 |
| 70 | 71 | |
| 2132 May 30 | 2150 Jun 10 | |

=== Tritos series ===
This eclipse is a part of a tritos cycle, repeating at alternating nodes every 135 synodic months (≈ 3986.63 days, or 11 years minus 1 month). Their appearance and longitude are irregular due to a lack of synchronization with the anomalistic month (period of perigee), but groupings of 3 tritos cycles (≈ 33 years minus 3 months) come close (≈ 434.044 anomalistic months), so eclipses are similar in these groupings.

Series members between 1922 and 2200
| 1922 Mar 13 (Saros 102) | 1933 Feb 10 (Saros 103) | | | |
| | | 1998 Aug 08 (Saros 109) | 2009 Jul 07 (Saros 110) | 2020 Jun 05 (Saros 111) |
| 2031 May 07 (Saros 112) | 2042 Apr 05 (Saros 113) | 2053 Mar 04 (Saros 114) | 2064 Feb 02 (Saros 115) | 2075 Jan 02 (Saros 116) |
| 2085 Dec 01 (Saros 117) | 2096 Oct 31 (Saros 118) | 2107 Oct 02 (Saros 119) | 2118 Aug 31 (Saros 120) | 2129 Jul 31 (Saros 121) |
| 2140 Jun 30 (Saros 122) | 2151 May 30 (Saros 123) | 2162 Apr 29 (Saros 124) | 2173 Mar 29 (Saros 125) | 2184 Feb 26 (Saros 126) |
2195 Jan 26 (Saros 127)

=== Inex series ===
This eclipse is a part of the long period inex cycle, repeating at alternating nodes, every 358 synodic months (≈ 10,571.95 days, or 29 years minus 20 days). Their appearance and longitude are irregular due to a lack of synchronization with the anomalistic month (period of perigee). However, groupings of 3 inex cycles (≈ 87 years minus 2 months) comes close (≈ 1,151.02 anomalistic months), so eclipses are similar in these groupings.

Series members between 1801 and 2200
| 1810 Sep 13 (Saros 105) | 1839 Aug 24 (Saros 106) | 1868 Aug 03 (Saros 107) |
| 1897 Jul 14 (Saros 108) | 1926 Jun 25 (Saros 109) | 1955 Jun 05 (Saros 110) |
| 1984 May 15 (Saros 111) | 2013 Apr 25 (Saros 112) | 2042 Apr 05 (Saros 113) |
| 2071 Mar 16 (Saros 114) | 2100 Feb 24 (Saros 115) | 2129 Feb 04 (Saros 116) |
| 2158 Jan 14 (Saros 117) | 2186 Dec 26 (Saros 118) | |

=== Half-Saros cycle ===
A lunar eclipse will be preceded and followed by solar eclipses by 9 years and 5.5 days (a half saros). This lunar eclipse is related to two annular solar eclipses of Solar Saros 120.

| March 30, 2033 | April 11, 2051 |

== See also ==
- List of lunar eclipses and List of 21st-century lunar eclipses
