= March 2024 lunar eclipse =

Penumbral lunar eclipse of 25 March 2024

- Penumbral eclipse
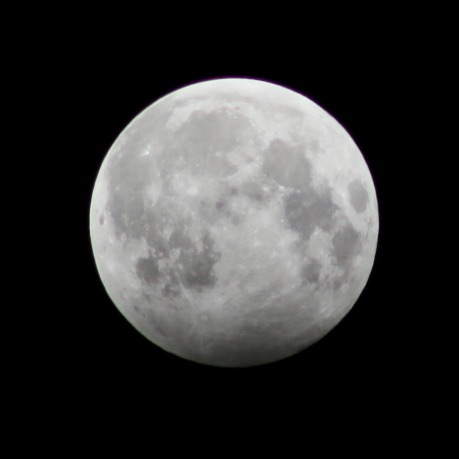
- Seen from Richmond, Virginia, 7:18 UTC
- Date: March 25, 2024
- Gamma: 1.0610
- Magnitude: −0.1304
- Saros cycle: 113 (64 of 71)
- Penumbral: 279 minutes, 52 seconds
Contacts (UTC)
- P1: 04:53:09
- Greatest: 07:12:51
- P4: 09:33:01

A penumbral lunar eclipse occurred at the Moon’s descending node of orbit on Monday, March 25, 2024, with an umbral magnitude of −0.1304. A lunar eclipse occurs when the Moon moves into the Earth's shadow, causing the Moon to be darkened. A penumbral lunar eclipse occurs when part or all of the Moon's near side passes into the Earth's penumbra. Unlike a solar eclipse, which can only be viewed from a relatively small area of the world, a lunar eclipse may be viewed from anywhere on the night side of Earth. Occurring about 1.6 days after apogee (15:44 UTC, March 23), the Moon's apparent diameter was smaller than average.

This was the deepest penumbral eclipse overall since May 5, 2023, and the deepest for North and South America since February 11, 2017.

== Visibility ==
The eclipse was completely visible over North and South America, seen rising over eastern Australia and northeast Asia and setting over west Africa and western Europe.

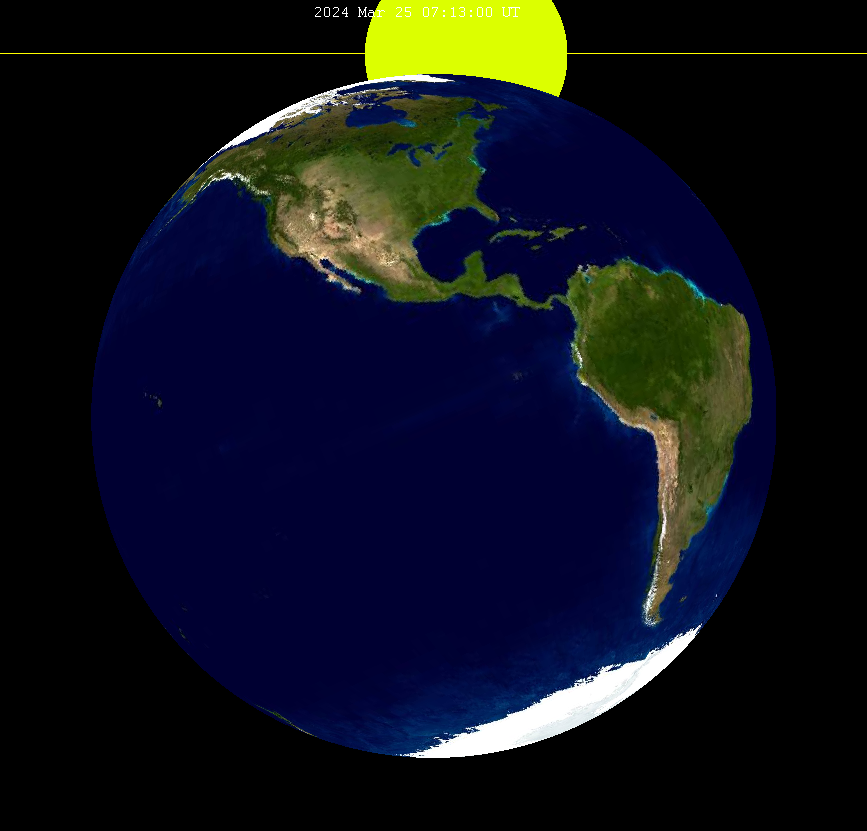
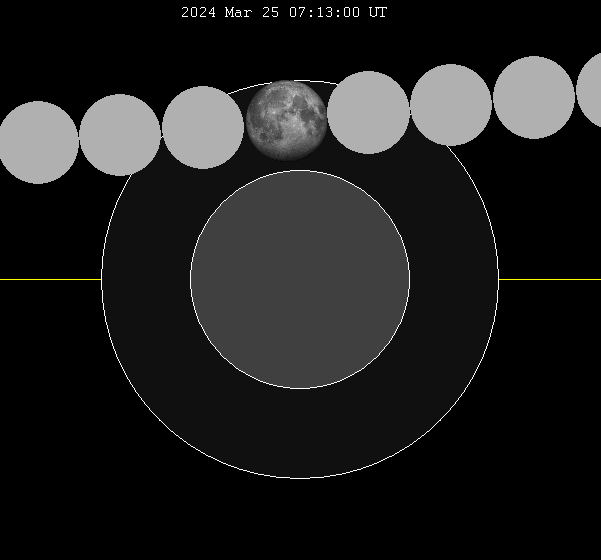

== Gallery ==
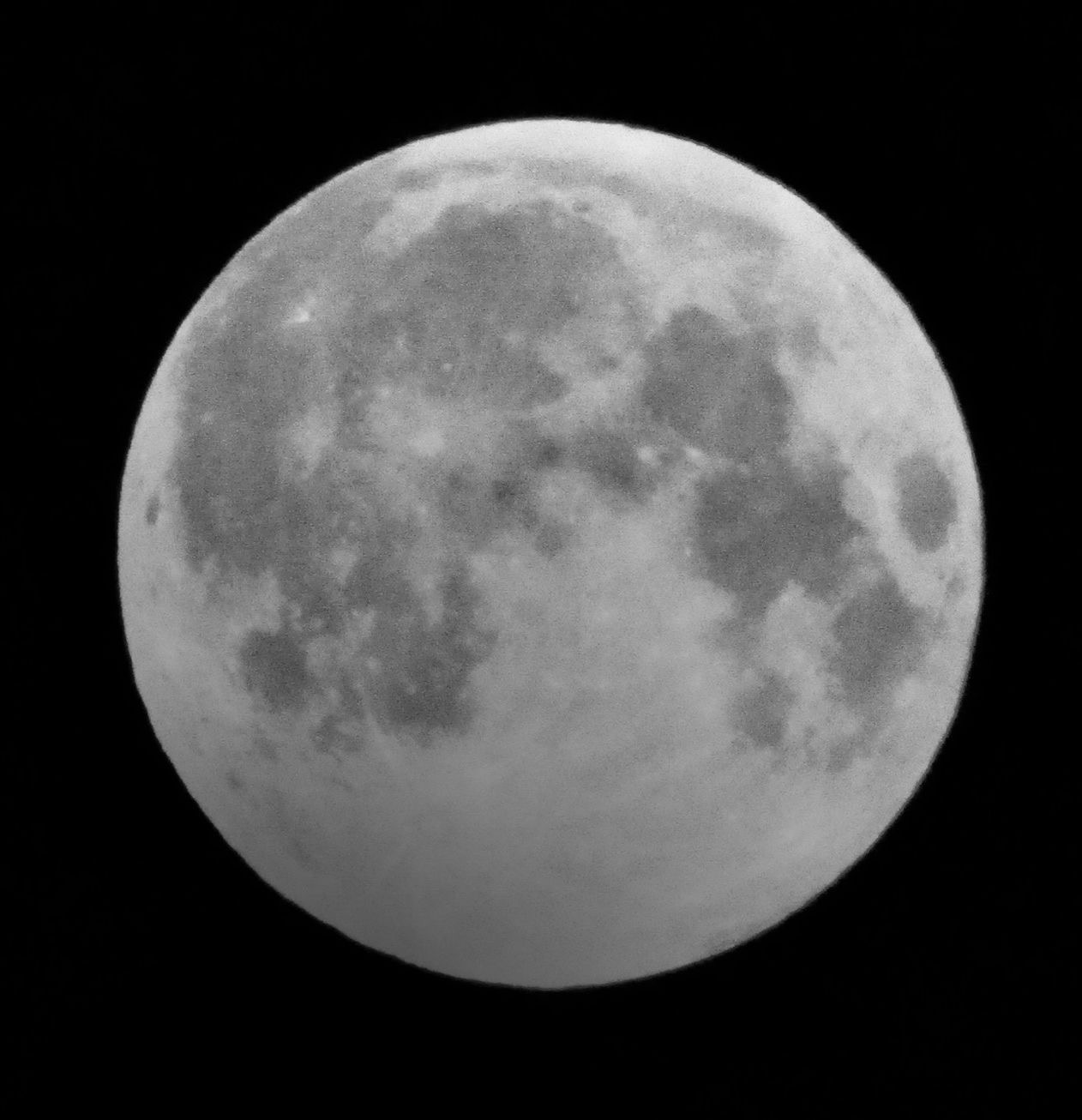
Los Angeles, California, 5:31 UTC

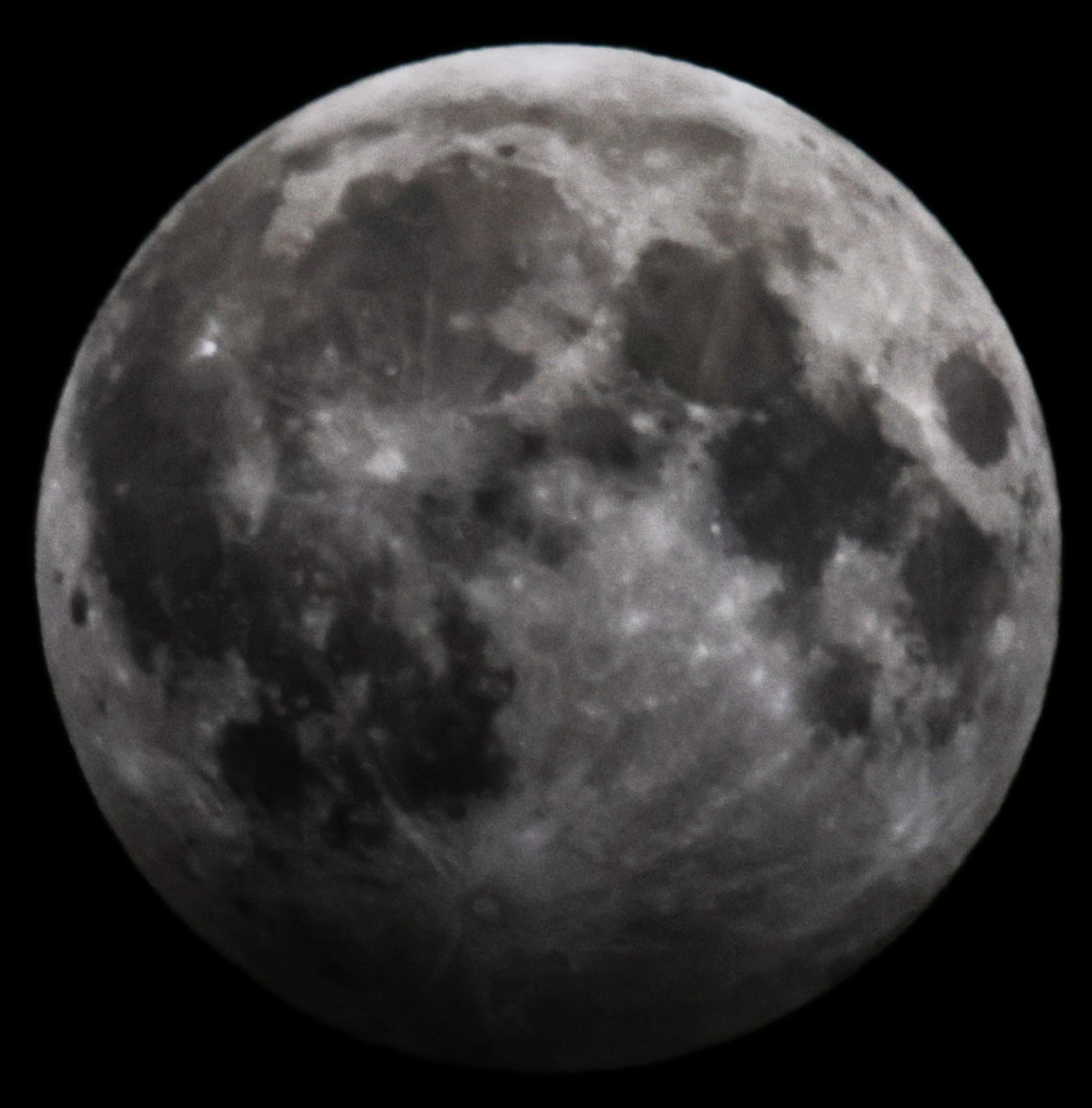
Middletown, New York, 6:31 UTC

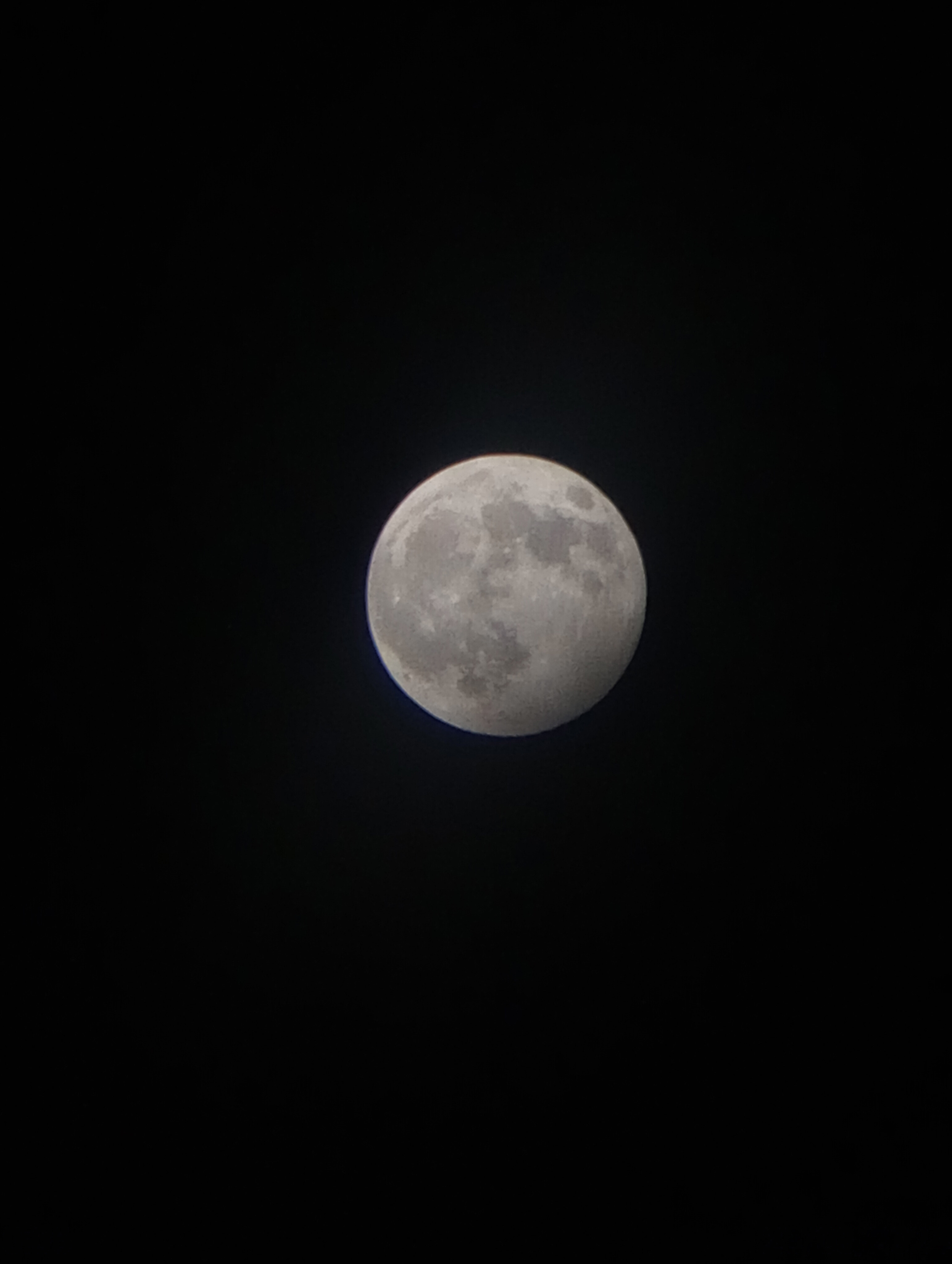
Mexicali, Mexico, 7:06 UTC

== Eclipse details ==
Shown below is a table displaying details about this particular lunar eclipse. It describes various parameters pertaining to this eclipse.

March 25, 2024 Lunar Eclipse Parameters
Parameter	Value
Penumbral Magnitude	0.95767
Umbral Magnitude	−0.13044
Gamma	1.06098
Sun Right Ascension	00^{h} 18^{m} 49.9^{s}
Sun Declination	+02° 02′ 16.6″
Sun Semi-Diameter	16′ 02.2″
Sun Equatorial Horizontal Parallax	08.8″
Moon Right Ascension	12^{h} 20^{m} 41.3^{s}
Moon Declination	−01° 12′ 05.6″
Moon Semi-Diameter	14′ 44.3″
Moon Equatorial Horizontal Parallax	0° 54′ 05.4″
ΔT	69.2 s

== Eclipse season ==
This eclipse is part of an eclipse season, a period, roughly every six months, when eclipses occur. Only two (or occasionally three) eclipse seasons occur each year, and each season lasts about 35 days and repeats just short of six months (173 days) later; thus two full eclipse seasons always occur each year. Either two or three eclipses happen each eclipse season. In the sequence below, each eclipse is separated by a fortnight.

Eclipse season of March–April 2024
March 25 Descending node (full moon)	April 8 Ascending node (new moon)
Penumbral lunar eclipse Lunar Saros 113	Total solar eclipse Solar Saros 139

== Related eclipses ==
=== Eclipses in 2024 ===
- A penumbral lunar eclipse on March 25.
- A total solar eclipse on April 8.
- A partial lunar eclipse on September 18.
- An annular solar eclipse on October 2.

=== Metonic ===
- Preceded by: Lunar eclipse of June 5, 2020
- Followed by: Lunar eclipse of January 12, 2028

=== Tzolkinex ===
- Preceded by: Lunar eclipse of February 11, 2017
- Followed by: Lunar eclipse of May 7, 2031

=== Half-Saros ===
- Preceded by: Solar eclipse of March 20, 2015
- Followed by: Solar eclipse of March 30, 2033

=== Tritos ===
- Preceded by: Lunar eclipse of April 25, 2013
- Followed by: Lunar eclipse of February 22, 2035

=== Lunar Saros 113 ===
- Preceded by: Lunar eclipse of March 14, 2006
- Followed by: Lunar eclipse of April 5, 2042

=== Inex ===
- Preceded by: Lunar eclipse of April 15, 1995
- Followed by: Lunar eclipse of March 4, 2053

=== Triad ===
- Preceded by: Lunar eclipse of May 25, 1937
- Followed by: Lunar eclipse of January 25, 2111

=== Lunar eclipses of 2024–2027 ===
This eclipse is a member of a semester series. An eclipse in a semester series of lunar eclipses repeats approximately every 177 days and 4 hours (a semester) at alternating nodes of the Moon's orbit.

The penumbral lunar eclipse on July 18, 2027 occurs in the next lunar year eclipse set.

Lunar eclipse series sets from 2024 to 2027
Descending node				Ascending node			
Saros	Date Viewing	Type Chart	Gamma	Saros	Date Viewing	Type Chart	Gamma
113	2024 Mar 25	Penumbral	1.0610	118	2024 Sep 18	Partial	−0.9792
123	2025 Mar 14	Total	0.3485	128	2025 Sep 07	Total	−0.2752
133	2026 Mar 03	Total	−0.3765	138	2026 Aug 28	Partial	0.4964
143	2027 Feb 20	Penumbral	−1.0480	148	2027 Aug 17	Penumbral	1.2797

=== Saros 113 ===
This eclipse is a part of Saros series 113, repeating every 18 years, 11 days, and containing 71 events. The series started with a penumbral lunar eclipse on April 29, 888 AD. It contains partial eclipses from July 14, 1014 through March 10, 1411; total eclipses from March 20, 1429 through August 7, 1645; and a second set of partial eclipses from August 18, 1663 through February 21, 1970. The series ends at member 71 as a penumbral eclipse on June 10, 2150.

The longest duration of totality was produced by member 38 at 103 minutes, 6 seconds on June 5, 1555. All eclipses in this series occur at the Moon’s descending node of orbit.

Greatest	First			
The greatest eclipse of the series occurred on 1555 Jun 05, lasting 103 minutes, 6 seconds.	Penumbral	Partial	Total	Central
The greatest eclipse of the series occurred on 1555 Jun 05, lasting 103 minutes, 6 seconds.	888 Apr 29	1014 Jul 14	1429 Mar 20	1483 Apr 22
The greatest eclipse of the series occurred on 1555 Jun 05, lasting 103 minutes, 6 seconds.	Last			
The greatest eclipse of the series occurred on 1555 Jun 05, lasting 103 minutes, 6 seconds.	Central	Total	Partial	Penumbral
The greatest eclipse of the series occurred on 1555 Jun 05, lasting 103 minutes, 6 seconds.	1609 Jul 16	1645 Aug 07	1970 Feb 21	2150 Jun 10

Eclipses are tabulated in three columns; every third eclipse in the same column is one exeligmos apart, so they all cast shadows over approximately the same parts of the Earth.

Series members 52–71 occur between 1801 and 2150:
52	53	54
1807 Nov 15	1825 Nov 25	1843 Dec 07
55	56	57
1861 Dec 17	1879 Dec 28	1898 Jan 08
58	59	60
1916 Jan 20	1934 Jan 30	1952 Feb 11
61	62	63
1970 Feb 21	1988 Mar 03	2006 Mar 14
64	65	66
2024 Mar 25	2042 Apr 05	2060 Apr 15
67	68	69
2078 Apr 27	2096 May 07	2114 May 19
70	71	
2132 May 30	2150 Jun 10	

=== Tritos series ===
This eclipse is a part of a tritos cycle, repeating at alternating nodes every 135 synodic months (≈ 3986.63 days, or 11 years minus 1 month). Their appearance and longitude are irregular due to a lack of synchronization with the anomalistic month (period of perigee), but groupings of 3 tritos cycles (≈ 33 years minus 3 months) come close (≈ 434.044 anomalistic months), so eclipses are similar in these groupings.

Series members between 1904 and 2200
1904 Mar 02 (Saros 102)	1915 Jan 31 (Saros 103)			
	1969 Aug 27 (Saros 108)	1980 Jul 27 (Saros 109)	1991 Jun 27 (Saros 110)	2002 May 26 (Saros 111)
2013 Apr 25 (Saros 112)	2024 Mar 25 (Saros 113)	2035 Feb 22 (Saros 114)	2046 Jan 22 (Saros 115)	2056 Dec 22 (Saros 116)
2067 Nov 21 (Saros 117)	2078 Oct 21 (Saros 118)	2089 Sep 19 (Saros 119)	2100 Aug 19 (Saros 120)	2111 Jul 21 (Saros 121)
2122 Jun 20 (Saros 122)	2133 May 19 (Saros 123)	2144 Apr 18 (Saros 124)	2155 Mar 19 (Saros 125)	2166 Feb 15 (Saros 126)
2177 Jan 14 (Saros 127)	2187 Dec 15 (Saros 128)	2198 Nov 13 (Saros 129)		

=== Inex series ===
This eclipse is a part of the long period inex cycle, repeating at alternating nodes, every 358 synodic months (≈ 10,571.95 days, or 29 years minus 20 days). Their appearance and longitude are irregular due to a lack of synchronization with the anomalistic month (period of perigee). However, groupings of 3 inex cycles (≈ 87 years minus 2 months) comes close (≈ 1,151.02 anomalistic months), so eclipses are similar in these groupings.

Series members between 1801 and 2200
1821 Aug 13 (Saros 106)	1850 Jul 24 (Saros 107)	1879 Jul 03 (Saros 108)
1908 Jun 14 (Saros 109)	1937 May 25 (Saros 110)	1966 May 04 (Saros 111)
1995 Apr 15 (Saros 112)	2024 Mar 25 (Saros 113)	2053 Mar 04 (Saros 114)
2082 Feb 13 (Saros 115)	2111 Jan 25 (Saros 116)	2140 Jan 04 (Saros 117)
2168 Dec 14 (Saros 118)	2197 Nov 24 (Saros 119)	

=== Half-Saros cycle ===
A lunar eclipse will be preceded and followed by solar eclipses by 9 years and 5.5 days (a half saros). This lunar eclipse is related to two total solar eclipses of Solar Saros 120.

March 20, 2015	March 30, 2033

== See also ==
- List of lunar eclipses and List of 21st-century lunar eclipses
