= Lunar Saros 114 =

Series of lunar eclipses

Member 59
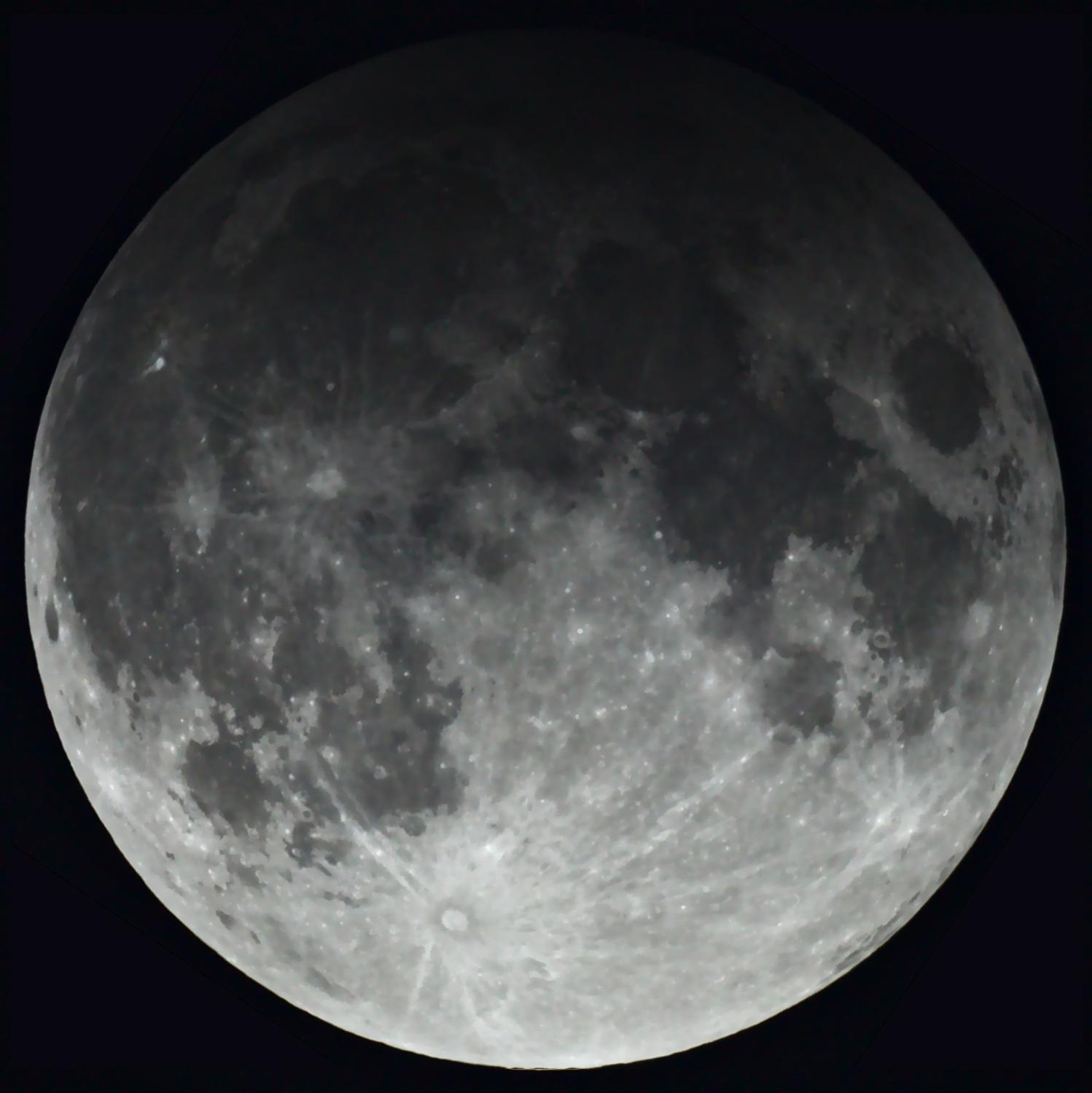
2017 Feb 11

Saros cycle series 114 for lunar eclipses occurs at the moon's ascending node, 18 years 11 and 1/3 days. It contains 71 member events, with 13 total eclipses, starting in 1458 and ending in 1674. Solar saros 121 interleaves with this lunar saros with an event occurring every 9 years 5 days alternating between each saros series.

This lunar saros is linked to Solar Saros 121.

== Summary ==
Lunar Saros series 114, repeating every 18 years and 11 days, has a total of 71 lunar eclipse events including 13 total lunar eclipses.

First Penumbral Lunar Eclipse: 0971 May 13

First Partial Lunar Eclipse: 1115 Aug 07

First Total Lunar Eclipse: 1458 Feb 28

First Central Lunar Eclipse: 1530 Apr 12

Greatest Eclipse of Lunar Saros 114: 1584 May 24 where totality lasted 106 minutes.

Last Central Lunar Eclipse: 1638 Jun 26

Last Total Lunar Eclipse: 1674 Jul 17

Last Partial Lunar Eclipse: 1890 Nov 26

Last Penumbral Lunar Eclipse: 2233 Jun 22

== List ==
Cat.	Saros	Mem	Date	Time UT (hr:mn)	Type	Gamma	Magnitude	Duration (min)			Contacts UT (hr:mn)						Chart
Cat.	Saros	Mem	Date	Greatest	Type	Gamma	Magnitude	Pen.	Par.	Tot.	P1	P4	U1	U2	U3	U4	Chart
07149	114	1	971 May 13	4:03:35	Penumbral	1.5318	-0.9674	73.4			3:26:53	4:40:17					
07190	114	2	989 May 23	10:53:23	Penumbral	1.4607	-0.8379	128.7			9:49:02	11:57:44					
07234	114	3	1007 Jun 03	17:38:22	Penumbral	1.3862	-0.7024	167.0			16:14:52	19:01:52					
07279	114	4	1025 Jun 14	0:19:56	Penumbral	1.3095	-0.5631	197.7			22:41:05	1:58:47					
07323	114	5	1043 Jun 25	6:59:58	Penumbral	1.2317	-0.4222	223.6			5:08:10	8:51:46					
07367	114	6	1061 Jul 05	13:39:56	Penumbral	1.1542	-0.2818	245.7			11:37:05	15:42:47					
07411	114	7	1079 Jul 16	20:20:34	Penumbral	1.0775	-0.1432	264.9			18:08:07	22:33:01					
07457	114	8	1097 Jul 27	3:04:22	Penumbral	1.0037	-0.0101	281.3			0:43:43	5:25:01					
07503	114	9	1115 Aug 7	9:52:28	Partial	0.9337	0.1158	295.4	81.4		7:24:46	12:20:10	9:11:46			10:33:10	
07549	114	10	1133 Aug 17	16:46:45	Partial	0.8689	0.2323	307.3	113.7		14:13:06	19:20:24	15:49:54			17:43:36	
07595	114	11	1151 Aug 28	23:46:23	Partial	0.8086	0.3403	317.5	135.7		21:07:38	2:25:08	22:38:32			0:54:14	
07643	114	12	1169 Sep 8	6:54:28	Partial	0.7554	0.4352	325.9	151.5		4:11:31	9:37:25	5:38:43			8:10:13	
07689	114	13	1187 Sep 19	14:09:42	Partial	0.7084	0.5189	332.9	163.5		11:23:15	16:56:09	12:47:57			15:31:27	
07735	114	14	1205 Sep 29	21:33:51	Partial	0.6688	0.5891	338.6	172.6		18:44:33	0:23:09	20:07:33			23:00:09	
07781	114	15	1223 Oct 11	5:05:11	Partial	0.6353	0.6482	343.3	179.5		2:13:32	7:56:50	3:35:26			6:34:56	
07827	114	16	1241 Oct 21	12:45:10	Partial	0.6089	0.6944	347.0	184.5		9:51:40	15:38:40	11:12:55			14:17:25	
07872	114	17	1259 Nov 01	20:31:53	Partial	0.5883	0.7303	349.8	188.3		17:36:59	23:26:47	18:57:44			22:06:02	
07917	114	18	1277 Nov 12	4:24:08	Partial	0.5727	0.7574	352.0	191.0		1:28:08	7:20:08	2:48:38			5:59:38	
07962	114	19	1295 Nov 23	12:21:47	Partial	0.5616	0.7765	353.7	192.9		9:24:56	15:18:38	10:45:20			13:58:14	
08007	114	20	1313 Dec 03	20:22:21	Partial	0.5534	0.7906	354.9	194.3		17:24:54	23:19:48	18:45:12			21:59:30	
08050	114	21	1331 Dec 15	4:24:50	Partial	0.5467	0.8025	355.8	195.5		1:26:56	7:22:44	2:47:05			6:02:35	
08091	114	22	1349 Dec 25	12:25:48	Partial	0.5389	0.8167	356.6	196.8		9:27:30	15:24:06	10:47:24			14:04:12	
08132	114	23	1368 Jan 05	20:26:16	Partial	0.5309	0.8316	357.3	198.1		17:27:37	23:24:55	18:47:13			22:05:19	
08173	114	24	1386 Jan 16	4:22:29	Partial	0.5199	0.8526	358.1	199.9		1:23:26	7:21:32	2:42:32			6:02:26	
08214	114	25	1404 Jan 27	12:13:43	Partial	0.5045	0.8819	359.1	202.2		9:14:10	15:13:16	10:32:37			13:54:49	
08255	114	26	1422 Feb 06	19:58:01	Partial	0.4834	0.9219	360.4	205.2		16:57:49	22:58:13	18:15:25			21:40:37	
08297	114	27	1440 Feb 18	3:35:32	Partial	0.4566	0.9728	361.9	208.8		0:34:35	6:36:29	1:51:08			5:19:56	
08338	114	28	1458 Feb 28	11:04:53	Total	0.4229	1.0365	363.6	212.8	31.3	8:03:05	14:06:41	9:18:29	10:49:14	11:20:32	12:51:17	
08379	114	29	1476 Mar 10	18:25:12	Total	0.3817	1.1140	365.5	217.2	53.9	15:22:27	21:27:57	16:36:36	17:58:15	18:52:09	20:13:48	
08419	114	30	1494 Mar 22	1:37:17	Total	0.3334	1.2046	367.4	221.7	70.1	22:33:35	4:40:59	23:46:26	1:02:14	2:12:20	3:28:08	
08459	114	31	1512 Apr 01	8:40:58	Total	0.2778	1.3087	369.1	225.9	82.9	5:36:25	11:45:31	6:48:01	7:59:31	9:22:25	10:33:55	
08500	114	32	1530 Apr 12	15:36:23	Total	0.2151	1.4260	370.5	229.6	92.9	12:31:08	18:41:38	13:41:35	14:49:56	16:22:50	17:31:11	
08541	114	33	1548 Apr 22	22:24:51	Total	0.1463	1.5543	371.4	232.4	100.3	19:19:09	1:30:33	20:28:39	21:34:42	23:15:00	0:21:03	
08585	114	34	1566 May 4	5:06:57	Total	0.0717	1.6932	371.6	234.1	104.7	2:01:09	8:12:45	3:09:54	4:14:36	5:59:18	7:04:00	
08628	114	35	1584 May 24	11:45:10	Total	-0.0065	1.8145	370.9	234.5	106.1	8:39:43	14:50:37	9:47:55	10:52:07	12:38:13	13:42:25	
08671	114	36	1602 Jun 04	18:18:12	Total	-0.0895	1.6640	369.2	233.2	104.0	15:13:36	21:22:48	16:21:36	17:26:12	19:10:12	20:14:48	
08716	114	37	1620 Jun 15	0:50:49	Total	-0.1735	1.5114	366.5	230.2	97.9	21:47:34	3:54:04	22:55:43	0:01:52	1:39:46	2:45:55	
08760	114	38	1638 Jun 26	7:21:47	Total	-0.2595	1.3548	362.6	225.3	86.8	4:20:29	10:23:05	5:29:08	6:38:23	8:05:11	9:14:26	
08804	114	39	1656 Jul 06	13:55:39	Total	-0.3437	1.2014	357.6	218.6	69.0	10:56:51	16:54:27	12:06:21	13:21:09	14:30:09	15:44:57	
08849	114	40	1674 Jul 17	20:30:10	Total	-0.4280	1.0478	351.6	209.9	35.2	17:34:22	23:25:58	18:45:13	20:12:34	20:47:46	22:15:07	
08895	114	41	1692 Jul 28	3:10:54	Partial	-0.5080	0.9016	344.7	199.6		0:18:33	6:03:15	1:31:06			4:50:42	
08942	114	42	1710 Aug 09	9:55:48	Partial	-0.5854	0.7601	337.1	187.4		7:07:15	12:44:21	8:22:06			11:29:30	
08989	114	43	1728 Aug 19	16:48:40	Partial	-0.6569	0.6291	329.0	173.8		14:04:10	19:33:10	15:21:46			18:15:34	
09035	114	44	1746 Aug 30	23:48:16	Partial	-0.7237	0.5069	320.5	158.7		21:08:01	2:28:31	22:28:55			1:07:37	
09082	114	45	1764 Sep 10	6:58:27	Partial	-0.7824	0.3992	312.2	142.8		4:22:21	9:34:33	5:47:03			8:09:51	
09127	114	46	1782 Sep 21	14:17:33	Partial	-0.8348	0.3031	304.1	125.9		11:45:30	16:49:36	13:14:36			15:20:30	
09172	114	47	1800 Oct 02	21:46:40	Partial	-0.8797	0.2205	296.5	108.3		19:18:25	0:14:55	20:52:31			22:40:49	
09217	114	48	1818 Oct 14	5:25:27	Partial	-0.9175	0.1512	289.7	90.3		3:00:36	7:50:18	4:40:18			6:10:36	
09263	114	49	1836 Oct 24	13:14:42	Partial	-0.9472	0.0966	283.9	72.5		10:52:45	15:36:39	12:38:27			13:50:57	
09309	114	50	1854 Nov 04	21:12:48	Partial	-0.9707	0.0537	278.9	54.3		18:53:21	23:32:15	20:45:39			21:39:57	
09353	114	51	1872 Nov 15	5:19:37	Partial	-0.9876	0.0229	275.0	35.5		3:02:07	7:37:07	5:01:52			5:37:22	
09397	114	52	1890 Nov 26	13:33:48	Partial	-0.9994	0.0017	271.9	9.8		11:17:51	15:49:45	13:28:54			13:38:42	
09440	114	53	1908 Dec 07	21:55:09	Penumbral	-1.0059	-0.0096	269.7			19:40:18	0:10:00					
09482	114	54	1926 Dec 19	6:20:07	Penumbral	-1.0101	-0.0163	268.0			4:06:07	8:34:07					
09524	114	55	1944 Dec 29	14:49:35	Penumbral	-1.0114	-0.0176	266.6			12:36:17	17:02:53					
09565	114	56	1963 Jan 09	23:19:42	Penumbral	-1.0128	-0.0185	265.3			21:07:03	1:32:21					
09606	114	57	1981 Jan 20	7:50:48	Penumbral	-1.0141	-0.0192	263.8			5:38:54	10:02:42					
09647	114	58	1999 Jan 31	16:18:35	Penumbral	-1.0189	-0.0258	261.7			14:07:44	18:29:26					
09688	114	59	2017 Feb 11	0:45:03	Penumbral	-1.0254	-0.0354	259.2			22:35:27	2:54:39					
09729	114	60	2035 Feb 22	9:06:12	Penumbral	-1.0367	-0.0535	255.7			6:58:21	11:14:03					
09769	114	61	2053 Mar 04	17:22:10	Penumbral	-1.0530	-0.0808	251.1			15:16:37	19:27:43					
09810	114	62	2071 Mar 16	1:31:09	Penumbral	-1.0756	-0.1194	245.1			23:28:36	3:33:42					
09851	114	63	2089 Mar 26	9:34:14	Penumbral	-1.1038	-0.1681	237.8			7:35:20	11:33:08					
09893	114	64	2107 Apr 07	17:30:11	Penumbral	-1.1382	-0.2283	228.7			15:35:50	19:24:32					
09935	114	65	2125 Apr 18	1:18:48	Penumbral	-1.1791	-0.3005	217.5			23:30:03	3:07:33					
09978	114	66	2143 Apr 29	9:01:22	Penumbral	-1.2256	-0.3830	204.1			7:19:19	10:43:25					
10022	114	67	2161 May 09	16:38:03	Penumbral	-1.2776	-0.4757	187.7			15:04:12	18:11:54					
10065	114	68	2179 May 21	0:09:10	Penumbral	-1.3346	-0.5778	167.6			22:45:22	1:32:58					
10108	114	69	2197 May 31	7:36:04	Penumbral	-1.3954	-0.6871	142.4			6:24:52	8:47:16					
10152	114	70	2215 Jun 12	14:59:57	Penumbral	-1.4594	-0.8024	108.9			14:05:30	15:54:24					
10196	114	71	2233 Jun 22	22:22:33	Penumbral	-1.5248	-0.9208	54.8			21:55:09	22:49:57					

== See also ==
- List of lunar eclipses
  - List of Saros series for lunar eclipses
