= Solar Saros 121 =

Saros cycle series 121 for solar eclipses

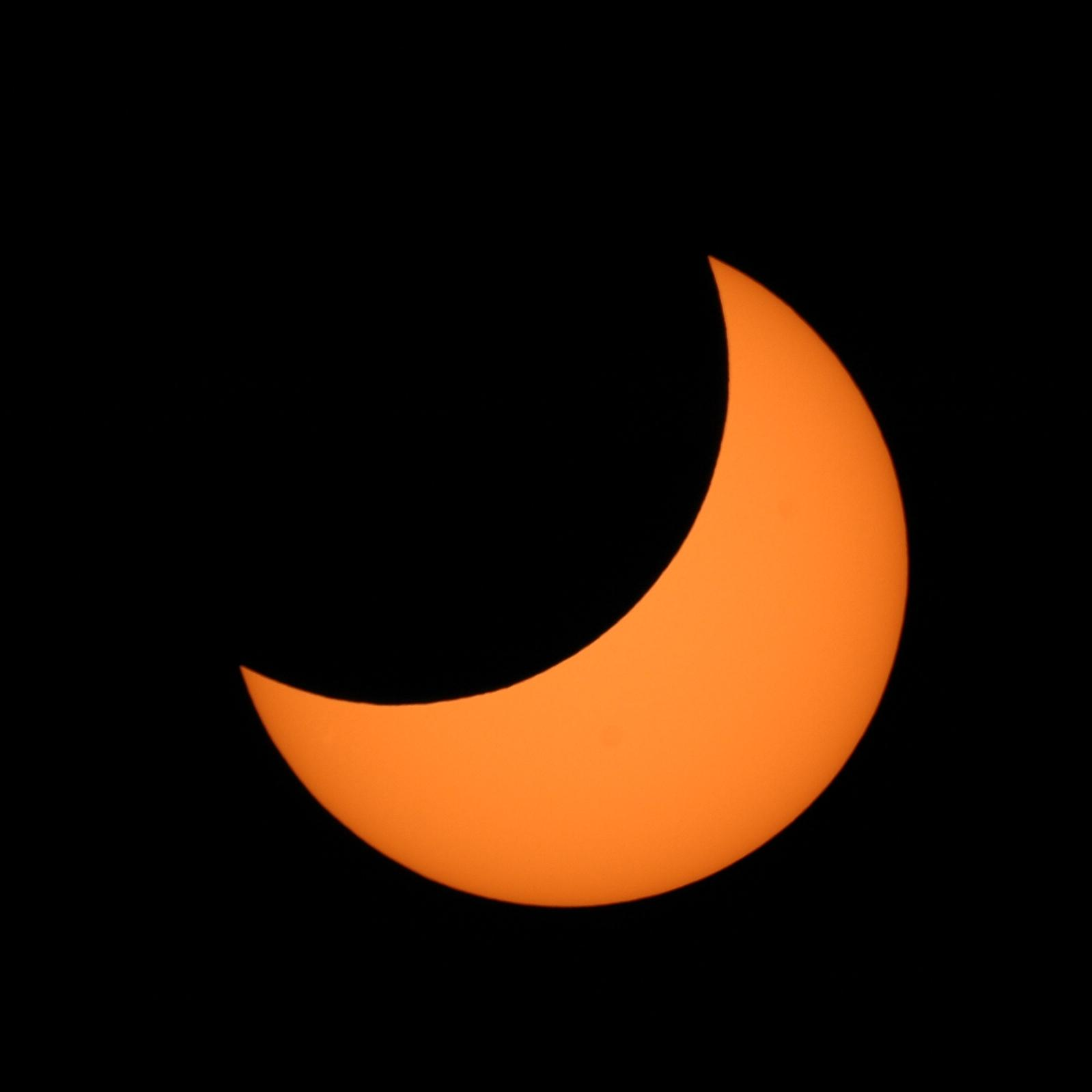
February 7, 2008 event from New Zealand Partiality from annular event Series member 60

Saros 121

Saros cycle series 121 for solar eclipses occurs at the Moon's ascending node, repeating every 18 years, 11 days, containing 71 eclipses. 55 of these are umbral eclipses (42 total, 2 hybrid, and 11 annular). The first eclipse in the series was on 25 April 944 and the last will be on 7 June 2206. The most recent eclipse was an annular eclipse on 17 February 2026 and the next will be an annular eclipse on 28 February 2044.

The longest totality was 6 minutes 20 seconds on 21 June 1692, the longest annular will be 2 minutes 27 seconds on February 28, 2044 and the longest hybrid eclipse was 30 seconds on 20 October 1827.

This solar saros is linked to Lunar Saros 114.

== Umbral eclipses ==
Umbral eclipses (annular, total and hybrid) can be further classified as either: 1) Central (two limits), 2) Central (one limit) or 3) Non-Central (one limit). The statistical distribution of these classes in Saros series 121 appears in the following table.

Classification	Number	Percent
All Umbral eclipses	55	100.00%
Central (two limits)	54	98.18%
Central (one limit)	1	1.82%
Non-central (one limit)	0	0.00%

== All eclipses ==
Note: Dates are given in the Julian calendar prior to 15 October 1582, and in the Gregorian calendar after that.

Saros	Member	Date	Time (Greatest) UTC	Type	Location Lat, Long	Gamma	Mag.	Width (km)	Duration (min:sec)	Ref
121	1	April 25, 944	10:56:13	Partial	62N 97.1W	1.5044	0.0666			
121	2	May 6, 962	18:15:23	Partial	62.6N 143.6E	1.4334	0.1965			
121	3	May 17, 980	1:32:03	Partial	63.3N 24.8E	1.3592	0.3338			
121	4	May 28, 998	8:46:18	Partial	64.2N 93.7W	1.282	0.4782			
121	5	June 7, 1016	16:00:58	Partial	65.1N 147.4E	1.2042	0.6246			
121	6	June 18, 1034	23:16:23	Partial	66N 28.1E	1.1262	0.7724			
121	7	June 29, 1052	6:33:32	Partial	67N 92.1W	1.0488	0.9196			
121	8	July 10, 1070	13:54:30	Total	80N 133.7E	0.9739	1.0404	636	2m 5s	
121	9	July 20, 1088	21:20:06	Total	80.7N 83.3W	0.9023	1.0453	356	2m 36s	
121	10	August 1, 1106	4:51:33	Total	70.8N 142.2E	0.8348	1.0481	292	3m 0s	
121	11	August 11, 1124	12:28:49	Total	61.4N 20.4E	0.7716	1.0497	259	3m 19s	
121	12	August 22, 1142	20:14:13	Total	52.9N 100.7W	0.7147	1.0504	238	3m 36s	
121	13	September 2, 1160	4:07:30	Total	44.9N 137.1E	0.664	1.0504	222	3m 49s	
121	14	September 13, 1178	12:08:37	Total	37.6N 13.3E	0.6196	1.05	210	3m 59s	
121	15	September 23, 1196	20:18:46	Total	30.9N 112.3W	0.5821	1.0491	199	4m 6s	
121	16	October 5, 1214	4:37:19	Total	24.8N 120.3E	0.5513	1.048	190	4m 11s	
121	17	October 15, 1232	13:04:38	Total	19.5N 8.9W	0.5277	1.0469	183	4m 14s	
121	18	October 26, 1250	21:37:26	Total	14.9N 139.2W	0.5085	1.0458	177	4m 16s	
121	19	November 6, 1268	6:18:16	Total	11.2N 88.8E	0.4959	1.0448	172	4m 16s	
121	20	November 17, 1286	15:03:22	Total	8.2N 43.9W	0.4865	1.0441	168	4m 17s	
121	21	November 27, 1304	23:53:25	Total	6.2N 177.7W	0.4812	1.0438	167	4m 17s	
121	22	December 9, 1322	8:44:26	Total	5N 48.4E	0.4767	1.0439	167	4m 17s	
121	23	December 19, 1340	17:37:50	Total	4.7N 86W	0.4741	1.0444	168	4m 17s	
121	24	December 31, 1358	2:29:35	Total	5.1N 140E	0.4701	1.0454	171	4m 18s	
121	25	January 10, 1377	11:19:31	Total	6.1N 6.5E	0.4646	1.0469	175	4m 19s	
121	26	January 21, 1395	20:05:24	Total	7.7N 126W	0.4555	1.0487	180	4m 21s	
121	27	February 1, 1413	4:47:05	Total	9.6N 102.6E	0.4429	1.0509	187	4m 25s	
121	28	February 12, 1431	13:21:50	Total	11.9N 26.9W	0.4245	1.0534	193	4m 30s	
121	29	February 22, 1449	21:50:09	Total	14.3N 154.6W	0.4008	1.0561	200	4m 36s	
121	30	March 6, 1467	6:10:42	Total	16.7N 79.9E	0.3706	1.0588	207	4m 44s	
121	31	March 16, 1485	14:24:22	Total	19.1N 43.6W	0.3345	1.0615	213	4m 53s	
121	32	March 27, 1503	22:28:20	Total	21.1N 164.1W	0.2904	1.064	218	5m 4s	
121	33	April 7, 1521	6:26:06	Total	22.8N 77.3E	0.2414	1.0662	222	5m 15s	
121	34	April 18, 1539	14:15:07	Total	23.7N 38.7W	0.1853	1.068	225	5m 28s	
121	35	April 28, 1557	21:59:05	Total	24N 153.1W	0.1251	1.0692	227	5m 42s	
121	36	May 10, 1575	5:34:45	Total	23.1N 94.6E	0.0583	1.0697	227	5m 56s	
121	37	May 30, 1593	13:07:31	Total	21.4N 17W	-0.0106	1.0696	227	6m 8s	
121	38	June 10, 1611	20:34:25	Total	18.4N 127.6W	-0.0836	1.0686	224	6m 16s	
121	39	June 21, 1629	3:59:24	Total	14.5N 121.6E	-0.158	1.067	221	6m 20s	
121	40	July 2, 1647	11:21:21	Total	9.6N 11E	-0.2344	1.0643	217	6m 15s	
121	41	July 12, 1665	18:44:06	Total	3.9N 100.6W	-0.3095	1.0611	211	6m 2s	
121	42	July 24, 1683	2:07:00	Total	2.5S 147.1E	-0.3838	1.0569	203	5m 38s	
121	43	August 4, 1701	9:31:44	Total	9.4S 33.7E	-0.4559	1.0521	193	5m 6s	
121	44	August 15, 1719	16:59:51	Total	16.8S 81.1W	-0.5243	1.0466	181	4m 27s	
121	45	August 26, 1737	0:32:08	Total	24.4S 162.5E	-0.5886	1.0407	167	3m 44s	
121	46	September 6, 1755	8:09:46	Total	32.1S 44.3E	-0.6478	1.0342	150	3m 0s	
121	47	September 16, 1773	15:52:23	Total	39.9S 75.5W	-0.702	1.0275	130	2m 18s	
121	48	September 27, 1791	23:42:30	Total	47.6S 162.4E	-0.7492	1.0206	106	1m 38s	
121	49	October 9, 1809	7:38:42	Total	55.1S 38.4E	-0.7905	1.0137	77	1m 2s	
121	50	October 20, 1827	15:42:05	Hybrid	62.3S 87.6W	-0.8251	1.007	43	0m 30s	
121	51	October 30, 1845	23:51:58	Hybrid	69.1S 144.5E	-0.8538	1.0005	3	0m 2s	
121	52	November 11, 1863	8:09:03	Annular	75.4S 15.1E	-0.876	0.9943	42	0m 22s	
121	53	November 21, 1881	16:31:10	Annular	81.2S 114.5W	-0.8931	0.9887	90	0m 43s	
121	54	December 3, 1899	0:57:28	Annular	86.6S 121.5E	-0.9061	0.9836	140	1m 1s	
121	55	December 14, 1917	9:27:20	Annular	88S 124.8E	-0.9157	0.9791	189	1m 17s	
121	56	December 25, 1935	17:59:52	Annular	83.5S 9.4E	-0.9228	0.9752	234	1m 30s	
121	57	January 5, 1954	2:32:01	Annular	79.1S 120.8W	-0.9296	0.972	278	1m 42s	
121	58	January 16, 1972	11:03:22	Annular	74.9S 107.7E	-0.9365	0.9692	321	1m 53s	
121	59	January 26, 1990	19:31:24	Annular	71S 22.2W	-0.9457	0.967	373	2m 3s	
121	60	February 7, 2008	3:56:10	Annular	67.6S 150.5W	-0.957	0.965	444	2m 12s	
121	61	February 17, 2026	12:13:06	Annular	64.7S 86.8E	-0.9743	0.963	616	2m 20s	
121	62	February 28, 2044	20:24:40	Annular	62.2S 25.6W	-0.9954	0.96	-	2m 27s	
121	63	March 11, 2062	4:26:16	Partial	61S 147.1W	-1.0238	0.9331			
121	64	March 21, 2080	12:20:15	Partial	60.9S 85.9E	-1.0578	0.8734			
121	65	April 1, 2098	20:02:31	Partial	61S 38.1W	-1.1005	0.7984			
121	66	April 13, 2116	3:36:55	Partial	61.3S 160.2W	-1.1487	0.7138			
121	67	April 24, 2134	10:59:59	Partial	61.8S 80.5E	-1.2052	0.6147			
121	68	May 4, 2152	18:14:02	Partial	62.3S 36.8W	-1.2679	0.5044			
121	69	May 16, 2170	1:18:33	Partial	63S 151.9W	-1.3371	0.3831			
121	70	May 26, 2188	8:15:53	Partial	63.8S 94.6E	-1.4109	0.2538			
121	71	June 7, 2206	15:05:59	Partial	64.7S 17.3W	-1.4894	0.1166			
