= 1970 lunar eclipse =

Two partial lunar eclipses occurred in 1970:

- 21 February 1970 lunar eclipse
- 17 August 1970 lunar eclipse

== See also ==
- List of 20th-century lunar eclipses
- Lists of lunar eclipses
