= 1952 lunar eclipse =

Two partial lunar eclipses occurred in 1952:

- 11 February 1952 lunar eclipse
- 5 August 1952 lunar eclipse

== See also ==
- List of 20th-century lunar eclipses
- Lists of lunar eclipses
