= December 1944 lunar eclipse =

Penumbral lunar eclipse December 29 1944

- Penumbral eclipse
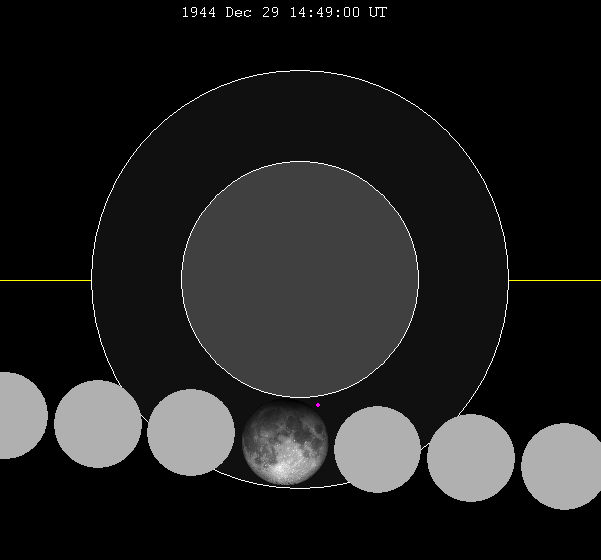
- The Moon's hourly motion shown right to left
- Date: December 29, 1944
- Gamma: −1.0115
- Magnitude: −0.0176
- Saros cycle: 114 (55 of 71)
- Penumbral: 266 minutes, 39 seconds
Contacts (UTC)
- P1: 12:35:46
- Greatest: 14:49:08
- P4: 17:02:25

A penumbral lunar eclipse occurred at the Moon’s ascending node of orbit on Friday, December 29, 1944, with an umbral magnitude of −0.0176. It was a relatively rare total penumbral lunar eclipse, with the Moon passing entirely within the penumbral shadow without entering the darker umbral shadow. A lunar eclipse occurs when the Moon moves into the Earth's shadow, causing the Moon to be darkened. A penumbral lunar eclipse occurs when part or all of the Moon's near side passes into the Earth's penumbra. Unlike a solar eclipse, which can only be viewed from a relatively small area of the world, a lunar eclipse may be viewed from anywhere on the night side of Earth. Occurring about 6 days after perigee (on December 23, 1944, at 12:40 UTC), the Moon's apparent diameter was larger.

This eclipse was the last of four penumbral lunar eclipses in 1944, with the others occurring on February 9, July 6, and August 4.

Saturn was conjunct with the Moon during this eclipse.

== Visibility ==
The eclipse was completely visible over much of Asia, Australia, and northwestern North America, seen rising over Europe, east Africa, and the Middle East and setting over much of North America and the eastern Pacific Ocean.

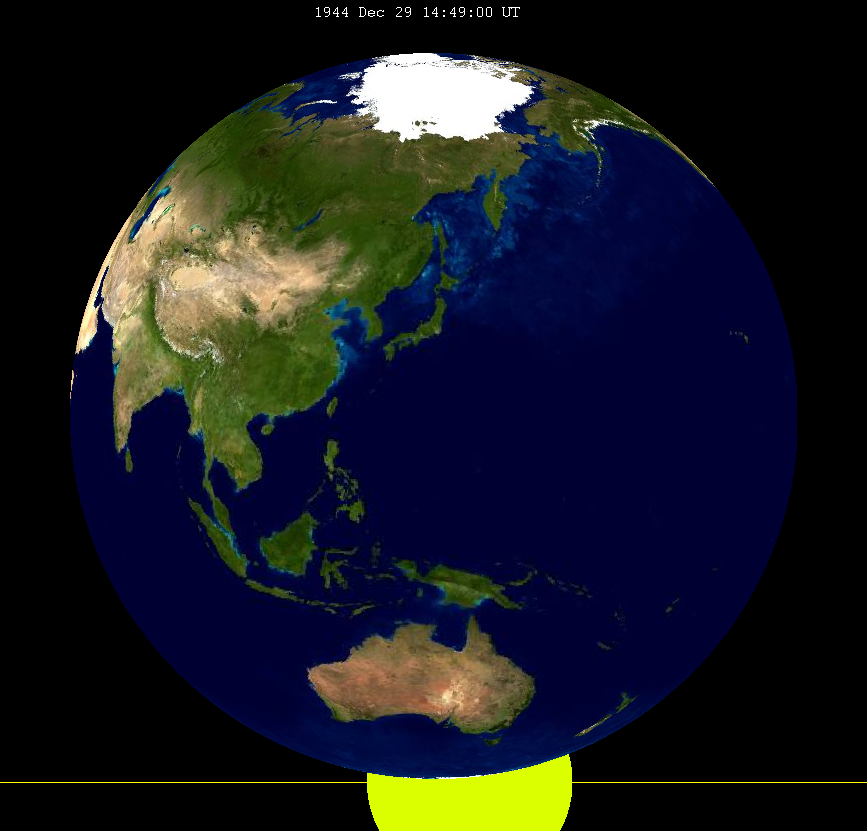
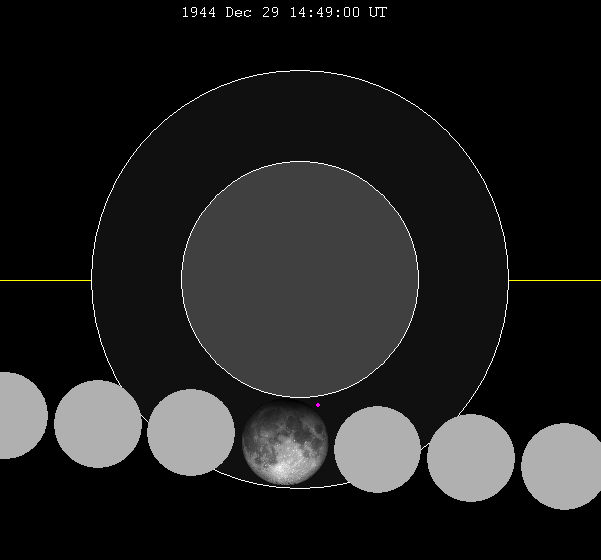

== Eclipse details ==
Shown below is a table displaying details about this particular solar eclipse. It describes various parameters pertaining to this eclipse.

December 29, 1944 Lunar Eclipse Parameters
Parameter	Value
Penumbral Magnitude	1.02198
Umbral Magnitude	−0.01757
Gamma	−1.01151
Sun Right Ascension	18h33m56.1s
Sun Declination	-23°12'58.6"
Sun Semi-Diameter	16'15.9"
Sun Equatorial Horizontal Parallax	08.9"
Moon Right Ascension	06h34m05.9s
Moon Declination	+22°14'56.3"
Moon Semi-Diameter	15'38.8"
Moon Equatorial Horizontal Parallax	0°57'25.5"
ΔT	26.9 s

== Eclipse season ==
This eclipse is part of an eclipse season, a period, roughly every six months, when eclipses occur. Only two (or occasionally three) eclipse seasons occur each year, and each season lasts about 35 days and repeats just short of six months (173 days) later; thus two full eclipse seasons always occur each year. Either two or three eclipses happen each eclipse season. In the sequence below, each eclipse is separated by a fortnight.

Eclipse season of December 1944–January 1945
December 29 Ascending node (full moon)	January 14 Descending node (new moon)
Penumbral lunar eclipse Lunar Saros 114	Annular solar eclipse Solar Saros 140

== Related eclipses ==
=== Eclipses in 1944 ===
- A total solar eclipse on January 25.
- A penumbral lunar eclipse on February 9.
- A penumbral lunar eclipse on July 6.
- An annular solar eclipse on July 20.
- A penumbral lunar eclipse on August 4.
- A penumbral lunar eclipse on December 29.

=== Metonic ===
- Preceded by: Lunar eclipse of March 13, 1941
- Followed by: Lunar eclipse of October 18, 1948

=== Tzolkinex ===
- Preceded by: Lunar eclipse of November 18, 1937
- Followed by: Lunar eclipse of February 11, 1952

=== Half-Saros ===
- Preceded by: Solar eclipse of December 25, 1935
- Followed by: Solar eclipse of January 5, 1954

=== Tritos ===
- Preceded by: Lunar eclipse of January 30, 1934
- Followed by: Lunar eclipse of November 29, 1955

=== Lunar Saros 114 ===
- Preceded by: Lunar eclipse of December 19, 1926
- Followed by: Lunar eclipse of January 9, 1963

=== Inex ===
- Preceded by: Lunar eclipse of January 20, 1916
- Followed by: Lunar eclipse of December 10, 1973

=== Triad ===
- Preceded by: Lunar eclipse of February 27, 1858
- Followed by: Lunar eclipse of October 30, 2031

=== Lunar eclipses of 1944–1947 ===
This eclipse is a member of a semester series. An eclipse in a semester series of lunar eclipses repeats approximately every 177 days and 4 hours (a semester) at alternating nodes of the Moon's orbit.

The penumbral lunar eclipses on February 9, 1944 and August 4, 1944 occur in the previous lunar year eclipse set.

Lunar eclipse series sets from 1944 to 1947
Descending node				Ascending node			
Saros	Date Viewing	Type Chart	Gamma	Saros	Date Viewing	Type Chart	Gamma
109	1944 Jul 06	Penumbral	1.2597	114	1944 Dec 29	Penumbral	−1.0115
119	1945 Jun 25	Partial	0.5370	124	1945 Dec 19	Total	−0.2845
129	1946 Jun 14	Total	−0.2324	134	1946 Dec 08	Total	0.3864
139	1947 Jun 03	Partial	−0.9850	144	1947 Nov 28	Penumbral	1.0838

=== Saros 114 ===
This eclipse is a part of Saros series 114, repeating every 18 years, 11 days, and containing 71 events. The series started with a penumbral lunar eclipse on May 13, 971 AD. It contains partial eclipses from August 7, 1115 through February 18, 1440; total eclipses from February 28, 1458 through July 17, 1674; and a second set of partial eclipses from July 28, 1692 through November 26, 1890. The series ends at member 71 as a penumbral eclipse on June 22, 2233.

The longest duration of totality was produced by member 35 at 106 minutes, 5 seconds on May 24, 1584. All eclipses in this series occur at the Moon’s ascending node of orbit.

Greatest	First			
The greatest eclipse of the series occurred on 1584 May 24, lasting 106 minutes, 5 seconds.	Penumbral	Partial	Total	Central
The greatest eclipse of the series occurred on 1584 May 24, lasting 106 minutes, 5 seconds.	971 May 13	1115 Aug 07	1458 Feb 28	1530 Apr 12
The greatest eclipse of the series occurred on 1584 May 24, lasting 106 minutes, 5 seconds.	Last			
The greatest eclipse of the series occurred on 1584 May 24, lasting 106 minutes, 5 seconds.	Central	Total	Partial	Penumbral
The greatest eclipse of the series occurred on 1584 May 24, lasting 106 minutes, 5 seconds.	1638 Jun 26	1674 Jul 17	1890 Nov 26	2233 Jun 22

Eclipses are tabulated in three columns; every third eclipse in the same column is one exeligmos apart, so they all cast shadows over approximately the same parts of the Earth.

Series members 48–69 occur between 1801 and 2200:
48	49	50
1818 Oct 14	1836 Oct 24	1854 Nov 04
51	52	53
1872 Nov 15	1890 Nov 26	1908 Dec 07
54	55	56
1926 Dec 19	1944 Dec 29	1963 Jan 09
57	58	59
1981 Jan 20	1999 Jan 31	2017 Feb 11
60	61	62
2035 Feb 22	2053 Mar 04	2071 Mar 16
63	64	65
2089 Mar 26	2107 Apr 07	2125 Apr 18
66	67	68
2143 Apr 29	2161 May 09	2179 May 21
69
2197 May 31

=== Tritos series ===
This eclipse is a part of a tritos cycle, repeating at alternating nodes every 135 synodic months (≈ 3986.63 days, or 11 years minus 1 month). Their appearance and longitude are irregular due to a lack of synchronization with the anomalistic month (period of perigee), but groupings of 3 tritos cycles (≈ 33 years minus 3 months) come close (≈ 434.044 anomalistic months), so eclipses are similar in these groupings.

Series members between 1801 and 2200
1803 Feb 06 (Saros 101)	1814 Jan 06 (Saros 102)	1824 Dec 06 (Saros 103)		1846 Oct 04 (Saros 105)
1857 Sep 04 (Saros 106)	1868 Aug 03 (Saros 107)	1879 Jul 03 (Saros 108)	1890 Jun 03 (Saros 109)	1901 May 03 (Saros 110)
1912 Apr 01 (Saros 111)	1923 Mar 03 (Saros 112)	1934 Jan 30 (Saros 113)	1944 Dec 29 (Saros 114)	1955 Nov 29 (Saros 115)
1966 Oct 29 (Saros 116)	1977 Sep 27 (Saros 117)	1988 Aug 27 (Saros 118)	1999 Jul 28 (Saros 119)	2010 Jun 26 (Saros 120)
2021 May 26 (Saros 121)	2032 Apr 25 (Saros 122)	2043 Mar 25 (Saros 123)	2054 Feb 22 (Saros 124)	2065 Jan 22 (Saros 125)
2075 Dec 22 (Saros 126)	2086 Nov 20 (Saros 127)	2097 Oct 21 (Saros 128)	2108 Sep 20 (Saros 129)	2119 Aug 20 (Saros 130)
2130 Jul 21 (Saros 131)	2141 Jun 19 (Saros 132)	2152 May 18 (Saros 133)	2163 Apr 19 (Saros 134)	2174 Mar 18 (Saros 135)
2185 Feb 14 (Saros 136)	2196 Jan 15 (Saros 137)			

=== Inex series ===
This eclipse is a part of the long period inex cycle, repeating at alternating nodes, every 358 synodic months (≈ 10,571.95 days, or 29 years minus 20 days). Their appearance and longitude are irregular due to a lack of synchronization with the anomalistic month (period of perigee). However, groupings of 3 inex cycles (≈ 87 years minus 2 months) comes close (≈ 1,151.02 anomalistic months), so eclipses are similar in these groupings.

Series members between 1801 and 2200
1829 Mar 20 (Saros 110)	1858 Feb 27 (Saros 111)	1887 Feb 08 (Saros 112)
1916 Jan 20 (Saros 113)	1944 Dec 29 (Saros 114)	1973 Dec 10 (Saros 115)
2002 Nov 20 (Saros 116)	2031 Oct 30 (Saros 117)	2060 Oct 09 (Saros 118)
2089 Sep 19 (Saros 119)	2118 Aug 31 (Saros 120)	2147 Aug 11 (Saros 121)
2176 Jul 21 (Saros 122)

=== Half-Saros cycle ===
A lunar eclipse will be preceded and followed by solar eclipses by 9 years and 5.5 days (a half saros). This lunar eclipse is related to two total solar eclipses of Solar Saros 121.

December 25, 1935	January 5, 1954

== See also ==
- List of lunar eclipses
- List of 20th-century lunar eclipses
