= January 1963 lunar eclipse =

Penumbral lunar eclipse January 9, 1963

- Penumbral eclipse
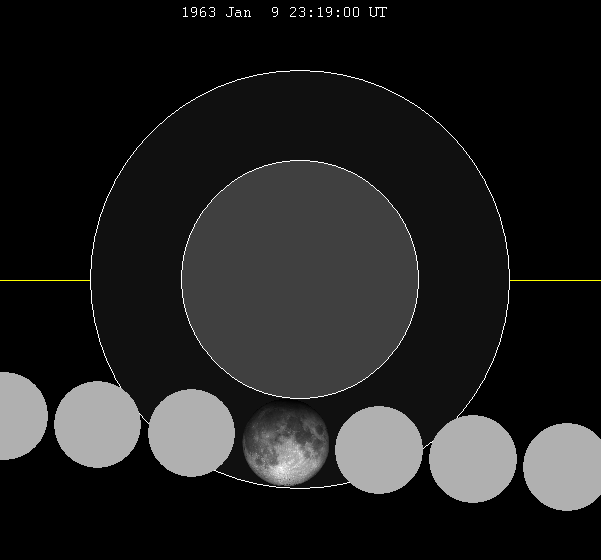
- The Moon's hourly motion shown right to left
- Date: January 9, 1963
- Gamma: −1.0128
- Magnitude: −0.0184
- Saros cycle: 114 (56 of 71)
- Penumbral: 265 minutes, 16 seconds
Contacts (UTC)
- P1: 21:06:27
- Greatest: 23:19:08
- P4: 1:31:44

A penumbral lunar eclipse occurred at the Moon’s ascending node of orbit on Wednesday, January 9, 1963, with an umbral magnitude of −0.0184. It was a relatively rare total penumbral lunar eclipse, with the Moon passing entirely within the penumbral shadow without entering the darker umbral shadow. A lunar eclipse occurs when the Moon moves into the Earth's shadow, causing the Moon to be darkened. A penumbral lunar eclipse occurs when part or all of the Moon's near side passes into the Earth's penumbra. Unlike a solar eclipse, which can only be viewed from a relatively small area of the world, a lunar eclipse may be viewed from anywhere on the night side of Earth. Occurring about 5.6 days after perigee (on January 4, 1963, at 8:25 UTC), the Moon's apparent diameter was larger.

== Visibility ==
The eclipse was completely visible over northeastern North America, Europe, Africa, and the western half of Asia, seen rising over North and South America and setting over east and southeast Asia and western Australia.

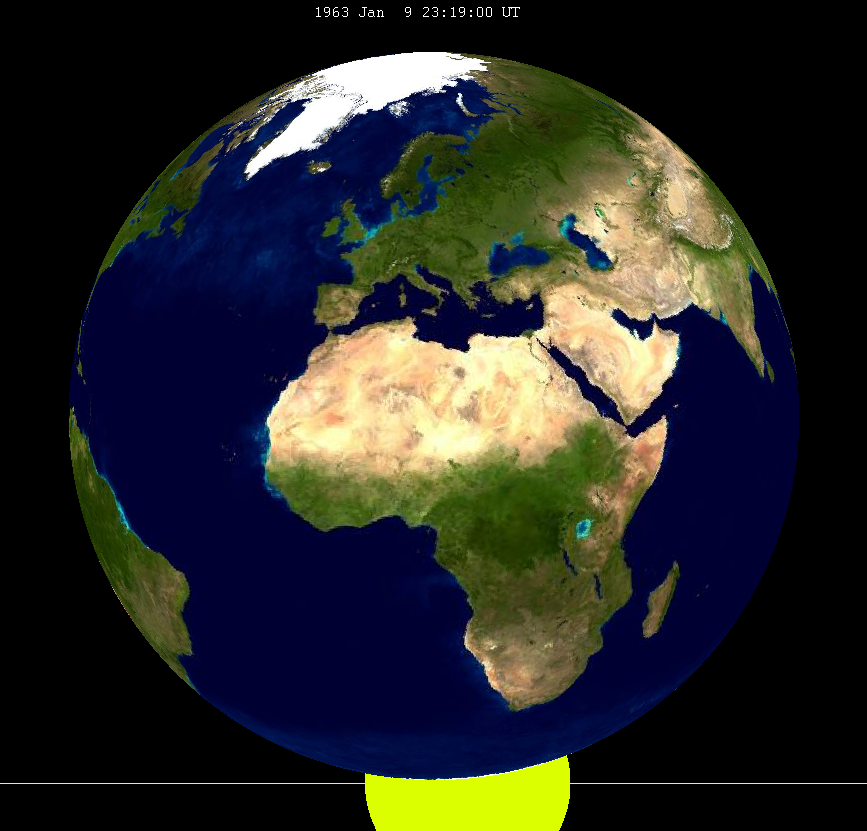
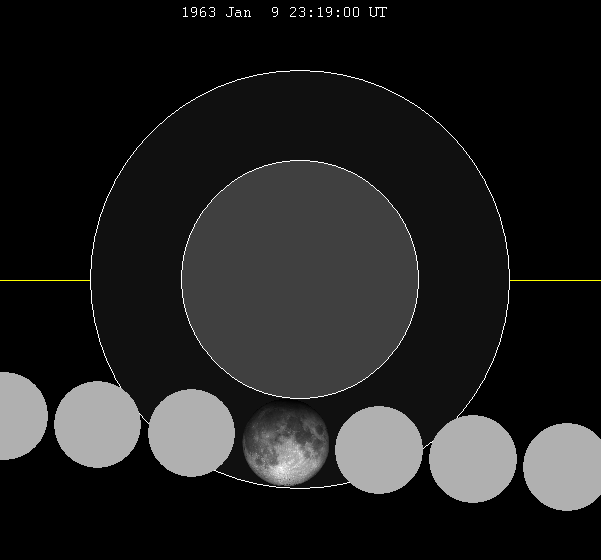

== Eclipse details ==
Shown below is a table displaying details about this particular solar eclipse. It describes various parameters pertaining to this eclipse.

January 9, 1963 Lunar Eclipse Parameters
Parameter	Value
Penumbral Magnitude	1.01802
Umbral Magnitude	−0.01844
Gamma	−1.01282
Sun Right Ascension	19h22m13.4s
Sun Declination	-22°05'52.3"
Sun Semi-Diameter	16'15.9"
Sun Equatorial Horizontal Parallax	08.9"
Moon Right Ascension	07h22m02.8s
Moon Declination	+21°07'35.9"
Moon Semi-Diameter	15'41.5"
Moon Equatorial Horizontal Parallax	0°57'35.5"
ΔT	34.5 s

== Eclipse season ==
This eclipse is part of an eclipse season, a period, roughly every six months, when eclipses occur. Only two (or occasionally three) eclipse seasons occur each year, and each season lasts about 35 days and repeats just short of six months (173 days) later; thus two full eclipse seasons always occur each year. Either two or three eclipses happen each eclipse season. In the sequence below, each eclipse is separated by a fortnight.

Eclipse season of January 1963
January 9 Ascending node (full moon)	January 25 Descending node (new moon)
Penumbral lunar eclipse Lunar Saros 114	Annular solar eclipse Solar Saros 140

== Related eclipses ==
=== Eclipses in 1963 ===
- A penumbral lunar eclipse on January 9.
- An annular solar eclipse on January 25.
- A partial lunar eclipse on July 6.
- A total solar eclipse on July 20.
- A total lunar eclipse on December 30.

=== Metonic ===
- Preceded by: Lunar eclipse of March 24, 1959
- Followed by: Lunar eclipse of October 29, 1966

=== Tzolkinex ===
- Preceded by: Lunar eclipse of November 29, 1955
- Followed by: Lunar eclipse of February 21, 1970

=== Half-Saros ===
- Preceded by: Solar eclipse of January 5, 1954
- Followed by: Solar eclipse of January 16, 1972

=== Tritos ===
- Preceded by: Lunar eclipse of February 11, 1952
- Followed by: Lunar eclipse of December 10, 1973

=== Lunar Saros 114 ===
- Preceded by: Lunar eclipse of December 29, 1944
- Followed by: Lunar eclipse of January 20, 1981

=== Inex ===
- Preceded by: Lunar eclipse of January 30, 1934
- Followed by: Lunar eclipse of December 21, 1991

=== Triad ===
- Preceded by: Lunar eclipse of March 10, 1876
- Followed by: Lunar eclipse of November 9, 2049

=== Lunar eclipses of 1962–1965 ===
This eclipse is a member of a semester series. An eclipse in a semester series of lunar eclipses repeats approximately every 177 days and 4 hours (a semester) at alternating nodes of the Moon's orbit.

The penumbral lunar eclipses on February 19, 1962 and August 15, 1962 occur in the previous lunar year eclipse set.

Lunar eclipse series sets from 1962 to 1965
Descending node				Ascending node			
Saros	Date Viewing	Type Chart	Gamma	Saros	Date Viewing	Type Chart	Gamma
109	1962 Jul 17	Penumbral	1.3371	114	1963 Jan 09	Penumbral	−1.0128
119	1963 Jul 06	Partial	0.6197	124	1963 Dec 30	Total	−0.2889
129	1964 Jun 25	Total	−0.1461	134	1964 Dec 19	Total	0.3801
139	1965 Jun 14	Partial	−0.9006	144	1965 Dec 08	Penumbral	1.0775

=== Saros 114 ===
This eclipse is a part of Saros series 114, repeating every 18 years, 11 days, and containing 71 events. The series started with a penumbral lunar eclipse on May 13, 971 AD. It contains partial eclipses from August 7, 1115 through February 18, 1440; total eclipses from February 28, 1458 through July 17, 1674; and a second set of partial eclipses from July 28, 1692 through November 26, 1890. The series ends at member 71 as a penumbral eclipse on June 22, 2233.

The longest duration of totality was produced by member 35 at 106 minutes, 5 seconds on May 24, 1584. All eclipses in this series occur at the Moon’s ascending node of orbit.

Greatest	First			
The greatest eclipse of the series occurred on 1584 May 24, lasting 106 minutes, 5 seconds.	Penumbral	Partial	Total	Central
The greatest eclipse of the series occurred on 1584 May 24, lasting 106 minutes, 5 seconds.	971 May 13	1115 Aug 07	1458 Feb 28	1530 Apr 12
The greatest eclipse of the series occurred on 1584 May 24, lasting 106 minutes, 5 seconds.	Last			
The greatest eclipse of the series occurred on 1584 May 24, lasting 106 minutes, 5 seconds.	Central	Total	Partial	Penumbral
The greatest eclipse of the series occurred on 1584 May 24, lasting 106 minutes, 5 seconds.	1638 Jun 26	1674 Jul 17	1890 Nov 26	2233 Jun 22

Eclipses are tabulated in three columns; every third eclipse in the same column is one exeligmos apart, so they all cast shadows over approximately the same parts of the Earth.

Series members 48–69 occur between 1801 and 2200:
48	49	50
1818 Oct 14	1836 Oct 24	1854 Nov 04
51	52	53
1872 Nov 15	1890 Nov 26	1908 Dec 07
54	55	56
1926 Dec 19	1944 Dec 29	1963 Jan 09
57	58	59
1981 Jan 20	1999 Jan 31	2017 Feb 11
60	61	62
2035 Feb 22	2053 Mar 04	2071 Mar 16
63	64	65
2089 Mar 26	2107 Apr 07	2125 Apr 18
66	67	68
2143 Apr 29	2161 May 09	2179 May 21
69
2197 May 31

=== Tritos series ===
This eclipse is a part of a tritos cycle, repeating at alternating nodes every 135 synodic months (≈ 3986.63 days, or 11 years minus 1 month). Their appearance and longitude are irregular due to a lack of synchronization with the anomalistic month (period of perigee), but groupings of 3 tritos cycles (≈ 33 years minus 3 months) come close (≈ 434.044 anomalistic months), so eclipses are similar in these groupings.

Series members between 1801 and 2200
1810 Mar 21 (Saros 100)	1821 Feb 17 (Saros 101)	1832 Jan 17 (Saros 102)	1842 Dec 17 (Saros 103)	
1864 Oct 15 (Saros 105)	1875 Sep 15 (Saros 106)	1886 Aug 14 (Saros 107)	1897 Jul 14 (Saros 108)	1908 Jun 14 (Saros 109)
1919 May 15 (Saros 110)	1930 Apr 13 (Saros 111)	1941 Mar 13 (Saros 112)	1952 Feb 11 (Saros 113)	1963 Jan 09 (Saros 114)
1973 Dec 10 (Saros 115)	1984 Nov 08 (Saros 116)	1995 Oct 08 (Saros 117)	2006 Sep 07 (Saros 118)	2017 Aug 07 (Saros 119)
2028 Jul 06 (Saros 120)	2039 Jun 06 (Saros 121)	2050 May 06 (Saros 122)	2061 Apr 04 (Saros 123)	2072 Mar 04 (Saros 124)
2083 Feb 02 (Saros 125)	2094 Jan 01 (Saros 126)	2104 Dec 02 (Saros 127)	2115 Nov 02 (Saros 128)	2126 Oct 01 (Saros 129)
2137 Aug 30 (Saros 130)	2148 Jul 31 (Saros 131)	2159 Jun 30 (Saros 132)	2170 May 30 (Saros 133)	2181 Apr 29 (Saros 134)
2192 Mar 28 (Saros 135)

=== Inex series ===
This eclipse is a part of the long period inex cycle, repeating at alternating nodes, every 358 synodic months (≈ 10,571.95 days, or 29 years minus 20 days). Their appearance and longitude are irregular due to a lack of synchronization with the anomalistic month (period of perigee). However, groupings of 3 inex cycles (≈ 87 years minus 2 months) comes close (≈ 1,151.02 anomalistic months), so eclipses are similar in these groupings.

Series members between 1801 and 2200
1818 Apr 21 (Saros 109)	1847 Mar 31 (Saros 110)	1876 Mar 10 (Saros 111)
1905 Feb 19 (Saros 112)	1934 Jan 30 (Saros 113)	1963 Jan 09 (Saros 114)
1991 Dec 21 (Saros 115)	2020 Nov 30 (Saros 116)	2049 Nov 09 (Saros 117)
2078 Oct 21 (Saros 118)	2107 Oct 02 (Saros 119)	2136 Sep 10 (Saros 120)
2165 Aug 21 (Saros 121)	2194 Aug 02 (Saros 122)	

=== Half-Saros cycle ===
A lunar eclipse will be preceded and followed by solar eclipses by 9 years and 5.5 days (a half saros). This lunar eclipse is related to two total solar eclipses of Solar Saros 121.

January 5, 1954	January 16, 1972

== See also ==
- List of lunar eclipses
- List of 20th-century lunar eclipses
