= January 1934 lunar eclipse =

Partial lunar eclipse January 30, 1934

- Partial eclipse
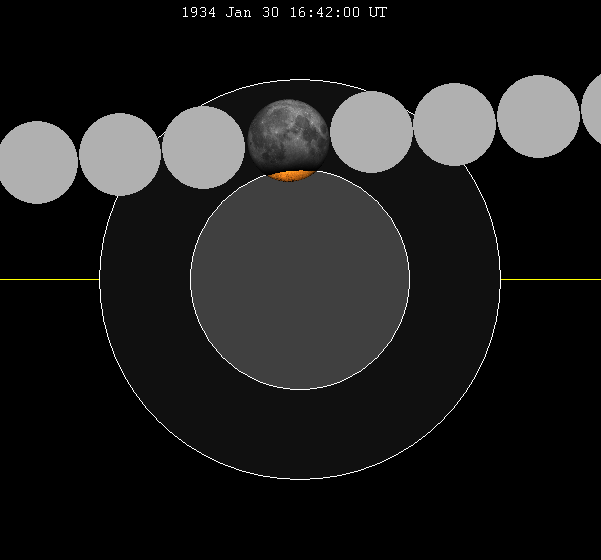
- The Moon's hourly motion shown right to left
- Date: January 30, 1934
- Gamma: 0.9258
- Magnitude: 0.1120
- Saros cycle: 113 (59 of 71)
- Partiality: 80 minutes, 55 seconds
- Penumbral: 304 minutes, 16 seconds
Contacts (UTC)
- P1: 14:10:10
- U1: 16:01:54
- Greatest: 16:42:18
- U4: 17:22:49
- P4: 19:14:26

A partial lunar eclipse occurred at the Moon’s descending node of orbit on Tuesday, January 30, 1934, with an umbral magnitude of 0.1120. A lunar eclipse occurs when the Moon moves into the Earth's shadow, causing the Moon to be darkened. A partial lunar eclipse occurs when one part of the Moon is in the Earth's umbra, while the other part is in the Earth's penumbra. Unlike a solar eclipse, which can only be viewed from a relatively small area of the world, a lunar eclipse may be viewed from anywhere on the night side of Earth. Occurring about 2.9 days after apogee (on January 27, 1934, at 18:55 UTC), the Moon's apparent diameter was smaller.

== Visibility ==
The eclipse was completely visible over Asia and Australia, seen rising over Africa and Europe and setting over western North America and the central Pacific Ocean.

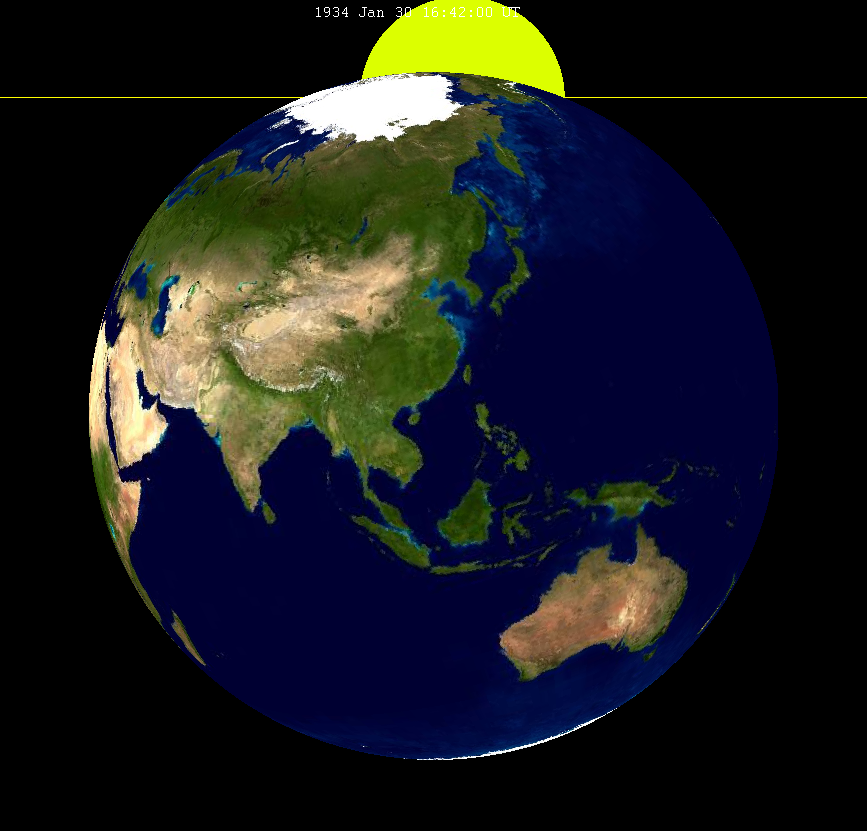
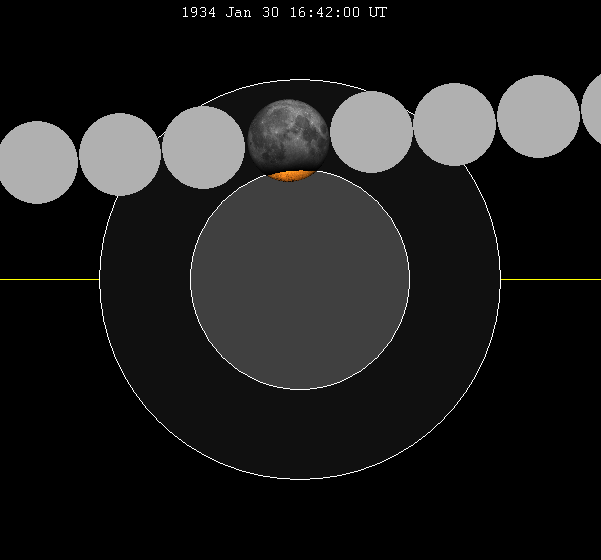

== Eclipse details ==
Shown below is a table displaying details about this particular solar eclipse. It describes various parameters pertaining to this eclipse.

January 30, 1934 Lunar Eclipse Parameters
Parameter	Value
Penumbral Magnitude	1.20734
Umbral Magnitude	0.11204
Gamma	0.92581
Sun Right Ascension	20h50m17.7s
Sun Declination	-17°42'54.6"
Sun Semi-Diameter	16'14.0"
Sun Equatorial Horizontal Parallax	08.9"
Moon Right Ascension	08h51m34.9s
Moon Declination	+18°29'48.4"
Moon Semi-Diameter	14'49.3"
Moon Equatorial Horizontal Parallax	0°54'23.7"
ΔT	23.8 s

== Eclipse season ==
This eclipse is part of an eclipse season, a period, roughly every six months, when eclipses occur. Only two (or occasionally three) eclipse seasons occur each year, and each season lasts about 35 days and repeats just short of six months (173 days) later; thus two full eclipse seasons always occur each year. Either two or three eclipses happen each eclipse season. In the sequence below, each eclipse is separated by a fortnight.

Eclipse season of January–February 1934
January 30 Descending node (full moon)	February 14 Ascending node (new moon)
Partial lunar eclipse Lunar Saros 113	Total solar eclipse Solar Saros 139

== Related eclipses ==
=== Eclipses in 1934 ===
- A partial lunar eclipse on January 30.
- A total solar eclipse on February 14.
- A partial lunar eclipse on July 26.
- An annular solar eclipse on August 10.

=== Metonic ===
- Preceded by: Lunar eclipse of April 13, 1930
- Followed by: Lunar eclipse of November 18, 1937

=== Tzolkinex ===
- Preceded by: Lunar eclipse of December 19, 1926
- Followed by: Lunar eclipse of March 13, 1941

=== Half-Saros ===
- Preceded by: Solar eclipse of January 24, 1925
- Followed by: Solar eclipse of February 4, 1943

=== Tritos ===
- Preceded by: Lunar eclipse of March 3, 1923
- Followed by: Lunar eclipse of December 29, 1944

=== Lunar Saros 113 ===
- Preceded by: Lunar eclipse of January 20, 1916
- Followed by: Lunar eclipse of February 11, 1952

=== Inex ===
- Preceded by: Lunar eclipse of February 19, 1905
- Followed by: Lunar eclipse of January 9, 1963

=== Triad ===
- Preceded by: Lunar eclipse of March 31, 1847
- Followed by: Lunar eclipse of November 30, 2020

=== Lunar eclipses of 1933–1936 ===
This eclipse is a member of a semester series. An eclipse in a semester series of lunar eclipses repeats approximately every 177 days and 4 hours (a semester) at alternating nodes of the Moon's orbit.

The penumbral lunar eclipses on March 12, 1933 and September 4, 1933 occur in the previous lunar year eclipse set.

Lunar eclipse series sets from 1933 to 1936
Descending node				Ascending node			
Saros	Date Viewing	Type Chart	Gamma	Saros	Date Viewing	Type Chart	Gamma
103	1933 Feb 10	Penumbral	1.5600	108	1933 Aug 05	Penumbral	−1.4216
113	1934 Jan 30	Partial	0.9258	118	1934 Jul 26	Partial	−0.6681
123	1935 Jan 19	Total	0.2498	128	1935 Jul 16	Total	0.0672
133	1936 Jan 08	Total	−0.4429	138	1936 Jul 04	Partial	0.8642
143	1936 Dec 28	Penumbral	−1.0971				

=== Saros 113 ===
This eclipse is a part of Saros series 113, repeating every 18 years, 11 days, and containing 71 events. The series started with a penumbral lunar eclipse on April 29, 888 AD. It contains partial eclipses from July 14, 1014 through March 10, 1411; total eclipses from March 20, 1429 through August 7, 1645; and a second set of partial eclipses from August 18, 1663 through February 21, 1970. The series ends at member 71 as a penumbral eclipse on June 10, 2150.

The longest duration of totality was produced by member 38 at 103 minutes, 6 seconds on June 5, 1555. All eclipses in this series occur at the Moon’s descending node of orbit.

Greatest	First			
The greatest eclipse of the series occurred on 1555 Jun 05, lasting 103 minutes, 6 seconds.	Penumbral	Partial	Total	Central
The greatest eclipse of the series occurred on 1555 Jun 05, lasting 103 minutes, 6 seconds.	888 Apr 29	1014 Jul 14	1429 Mar 20	1483 Apr 22
The greatest eclipse of the series occurred on 1555 Jun 05, lasting 103 minutes, 6 seconds.	Last			
The greatest eclipse of the series occurred on 1555 Jun 05, lasting 103 minutes, 6 seconds.	Central	Total	Partial	Penumbral
The greatest eclipse of the series occurred on 1555 Jun 05, lasting 103 minutes, 6 seconds.	1609 Jul 16	1645 Aug 07	1970 Feb 21	2150 Jun 10

Eclipses are tabulated in three columns; every third eclipse in the same column is one exeligmos apart, so they all cast shadows over approximately the same parts of the Earth.

Series members 52–71 occur between 1801 and 2150:
52	53	54
1807 Nov 15	1825 Nov 25	1843 Dec 07
55	56	57
1861 Dec 17	1879 Dec 28	1898 Jan 08
58	59	60
1916 Jan 20	1934 Jan 30	1952 Feb 11
61	62	63
1970 Feb 21	1988 Mar 03	2006 Mar 14
64	65	66
2024 Mar 25	2042 Apr 05	2060 Apr 15
67	68	69
2078 Apr 27	2096 May 07	2114 May 19
70	71	
2132 May 30	2150 Jun 10	

=== Tritos series ===
This eclipse is a part of a tritos cycle, repeating at alternating nodes every 135 synodic months (≈ 3986.63 days, or 11 years minus 1 month). Their appearance and longitude are irregular due to a lack of synchronization with the anomalistic month (period of perigee), but groupings of 3 tritos cycles (≈ 33 years minus 3 months) come close (≈ 434.044 anomalistic months), so eclipses are similar in these groupings.

Series members between 1801 and 2200
1803 Feb 06 (Saros 101)	1814 Jan 06 (Saros 102)	1824 Dec 06 (Saros 103)		1846 Oct 04 (Saros 105)
1857 Sep 04 (Saros 106)	1868 Aug 03 (Saros 107)	1879 Jul 03 (Saros 108)	1890 Jun 03 (Saros 109)	1901 May 03 (Saros 110)
1912 Apr 01 (Saros 111)	1923 Mar 03 (Saros 112)	1934 Jan 30 (Saros 113)	1944 Dec 29 (Saros 114)	1955 Nov 29 (Saros 115)
1966 Oct 29 (Saros 116)	1977 Sep 27 (Saros 117)	1988 Aug 27 (Saros 118)	1999 Jul 28 (Saros 119)	2010 Jun 26 (Saros 120)
2021 May 26 (Saros 121)	2032 Apr 25 (Saros 122)	2043 Mar 25 (Saros 123)	2054 Feb 22 (Saros 124)	2065 Jan 22 (Saros 125)
2075 Dec 22 (Saros 126)	2086 Nov 20 (Saros 127)	2097 Oct 21 (Saros 128)	2108 Sep 20 (Saros 129)	2119 Aug 20 (Saros 130)
2130 Jul 21 (Saros 131)	2141 Jun 19 (Saros 132)	2152 May 18 (Saros 133)	2163 Apr 19 (Saros 134)	2174 Mar 18 (Saros 135)
2185 Feb 14 (Saros 136)	2196 Jan 15 (Saros 137)			

=== Inex series ===
This eclipse is a part of the long period inex cycle, repeating at alternating nodes, every 358 synodic months (≈ 10,571.95 days, or 29 years minus 20 days). Their appearance and longitude are irregular due to a lack of synchronization with the anomalistic month (period of perigee). However, groupings of 3 inex cycles (≈ 87 years minus 2 months) comes close (≈ 1,151.02 anomalistic months), so eclipses are similar in these groupings.

Series members between 1801 and 2200
1818 Apr 21 (Saros 109)	1847 Mar 31 (Saros 110)	1876 Mar 10 (Saros 111)
1905 Feb 19 (Saros 112)	1934 Jan 30 (Saros 113)	1963 Jan 09 (Saros 114)
1991 Dec 21 (Saros 115)	2020 Nov 30 (Saros 116)	2049 Nov 09 (Saros 117)
2078 Oct 21 (Saros 118)	2107 Oct 02 (Saros 119)	2136 Sep 10 (Saros 120)
2165 Aug 21 (Saros 121)	2194 Aug 02 (Saros 122)	

=== Half-Saros cycle ===
A lunar eclipse will be preceded and followed by solar eclipses by 9 years and 5.5 days (a half saros). This lunar eclipse is related to two total solar eclipses of Solar Saros 120.

January 24, 1925	February 4, 1943

== See also ==
- List of lunar eclipses
- List of 20th-century lunar eclipses
