= March 1988 lunar eclipse =

Astronomical event

- Penumbral eclipse
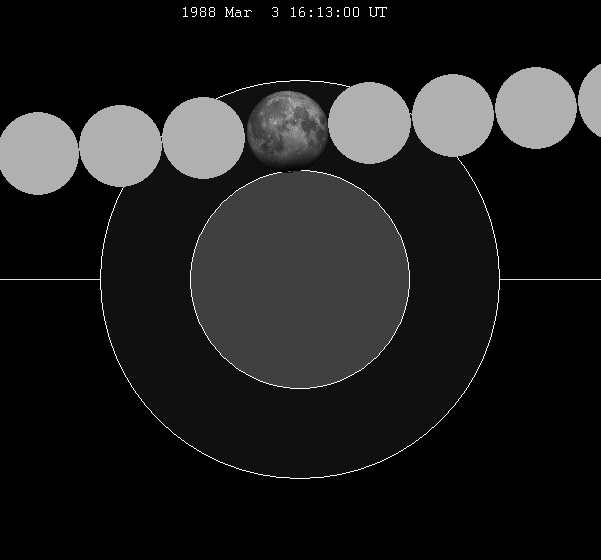
- The Moon's hourly motion shown right to left
- Date: March 3, 1988
- Gamma: 0.9886
- Magnitude: −0.0016
- Saros cycle: 113 (62 of 71)
- Penumbral: 293 minutes, 45 seconds
Contacts (UTC)
- P1: 13:45:52
- Greatest: 16:12:45
- P4: 18:39:37

A penumbral lunar eclipse occurred at the Moon’s descending node of orbit on Thursday, March 3, 1988, with an umbral magnitude of −0.0016. It was a relatively rare total penumbral lunar eclipse, with the Moon passing entirely within the penumbral shadow without entering the darker umbral shadow. A lunar eclipse occurs when the Moon moves into the Earth's shadow, causing the Moon to be darkened. A penumbral lunar eclipse occurs when part or all of the Moon's near side passes into the Earth's penumbra. Unlike a solar eclipse, which can only be viewed from a relatively small area of the world, a lunar eclipse may be viewed from anywhere on the night side of Earth. Occurring about 2.2 days after apogee (on March 1, 1988, at 11:50 UTC), the Moon's apparent diameter was smaller.

== Visibility ==
The eclipse was completely visible over most of Asia and Australia, seen rising over much of Africa, Europe, and the Middle East and setting over western North America and the central Pacific Ocean.

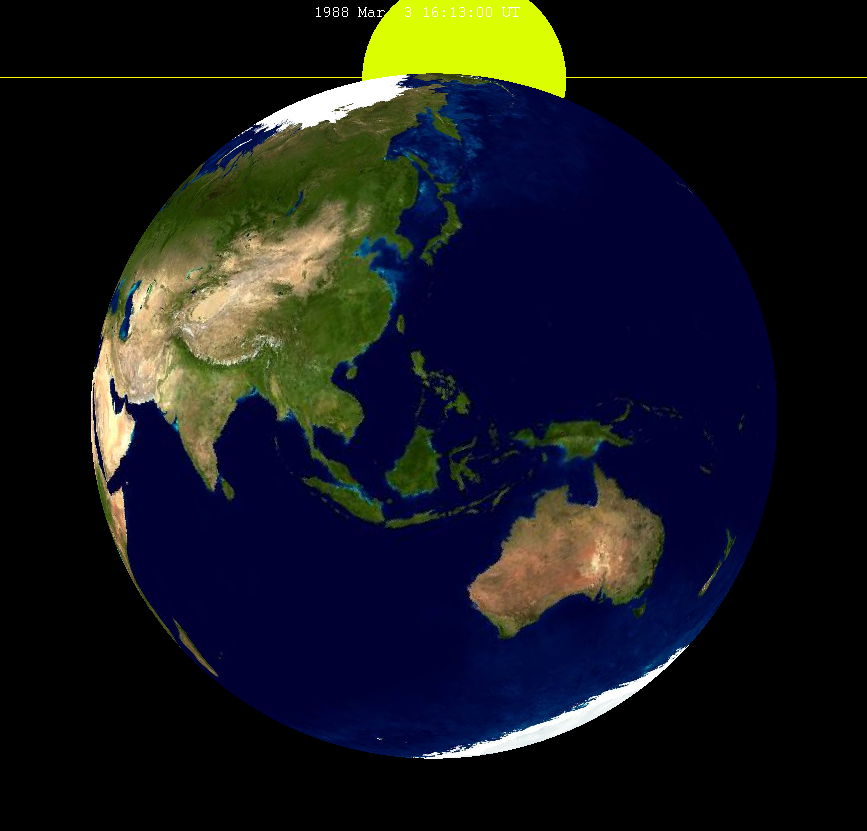
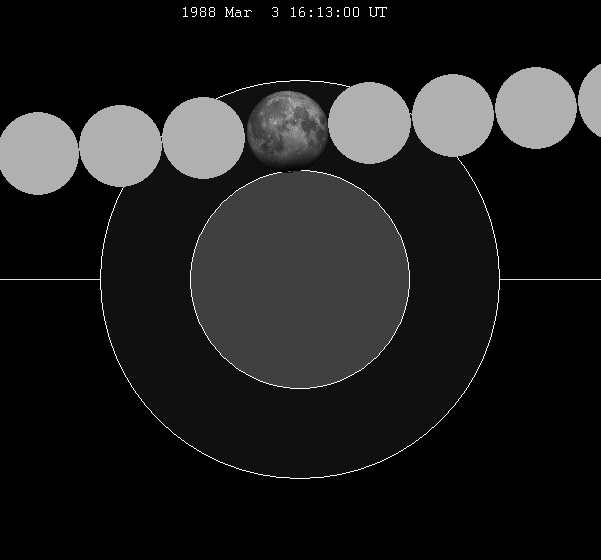

== Eclipse details ==
Shown below is a table displaying details about this particular solar eclipse. It describes various parameters pertaining to this eclipse.

March 3, 1988 Lunar Eclipse Parameters
Parameter	Value
Penumbral Magnitude	1.09076
Umbral Magnitude	−0.00163
Gamma	0.98855
Sun Right Ascension	22h58m28.1s
Sun Declination	-06°33'42.5"
Sun Semi-Diameter	16'07.8"
Sun Equatorial Horizontal Parallax	08.9"
Moon Right Ascension	11h00m10.4s
Moon Declination	+07°20'53.4"
Moon Semi-Diameter	14'46.0"
Moon Equatorial Horizontal Parallax	0°54'11.6"
ΔT	55.8 s

== Eclipse season ==
This eclipse is part of an eclipse season, a period, roughly every six months, when eclipses occur. Only two (or occasionally three) eclipse seasons occur each year, and each season lasts about 35 days and repeats just short of six months (173 days) later; thus two full eclipse seasons always occur each year. Either two or three eclipses happen each eclipse season. In the sequence below, each eclipse is separated by a fortnight.

Eclipse season of March 1988
March 3 Descending node (full moon)	March 18 Ascending node (new moon)
Penumbral lunar eclipse Lunar Saros 113	Total solar eclipse Solar Saros 139

== Related eclipses ==
=== Eclipses in 1988 ===
- A penumbral lunar eclipse on March 3.
- A total solar eclipse on March 18.
- A partial lunar eclipse on August 27.
- An annular solar eclipse on September 11.

=== Metonic ===
- Preceded by: Lunar eclipse of May 15, 1984
- Followed by: Lunar eclipse of December 21, 1991

=== Tzolkinex ===
- Preceded by: Lunar eclipse of January 20, 1981
- Followed by: Lunar eclipse of April 15, 1995

=== Half-Saros ===
- Preceded by: Solar eclipse of February 26, 1979
- Followed by: Solar eclipse of March 9, 1997

=== Tritos ===
- Preceded by: Lunar eclipse of April 4, 1977
- Followed by: Lunar eclipse of January 31, 1999

=== Lunar Saros 113 ===
- Preceded by: Lunar eclipse of February 21, 1970
- Followed by: Lunar eclipse of March 14, 2006

=== Inex ===
- Preceded by: Lunar eclipse of March 24, 1959
- Followed by: Lunar eclipse of February 11, 2017

=== Triad ===
- Preceded by: Lunar eclipse of May 3, 1901
- Followed by: Lunar eclipse of January 2, 2075

=== Lunar eclipses of 1988–1991 ===
This eclipse is a member of a semester series. An eclipse in a semester series of lunar eclipses repeats approximately every 177 days and 4 hours (a semester) at alternating nodes of the Moon's orbit.

The lunar eclipses on June 27, 1991 (penumbral) and December 21, 1991 (partial) occur in the next lunar year eclipse set.

Lunar eclipse series sets from 1988 to 1991
Descending node				Ascending node			
Saros	Date Viewing	Type Chart	Gamma	Saros	Date Viewing	Type Chart	Gamma
113	1988 Mar 03	Penumbral	0.9886	118	1988 Aug 27	Partial	−0.8682
123	1989 Feb 20	Total	0.2935	128	1989 Aug 17	Total	−0.1491
133	1990 Feb 09	Total	−0.4148	138	1990 Aug 06	Partial	0.6374
143	1991 Jan 30	Penumbral	−1.0752	148	1991 Jul 26	Penumbral	1.4370

=== Metonic series ===
The Metonic cycle repeats nearly exactly every 19 years and represents a Saros cycle plus one lunar year. Because it occurs on the same calendar date, the Earth's shadow will be in nearly the same location relative to the background stars.

1. 1988 Mar 03.675 – Partial (113); 2. 2007 Mar 03.972 – Total (123); 3. 2026 Mar 03.481 – Total (133); 4. 2045 Mar 03.320 – Penumbral (143)	1. 1988 Aug 27.461 – partial (118); 2. 2007 Aug 28.442 – total (128); 3. 2026 Aug 28.175 – partial (138); 4. 2045 Aug 27.578 – penumbral (148)

=== Saros 113 ===
This eclipse is a part of Saros series 113, repeating every 18 years, 11 days, and containing 71 events. The series started with a penumbral lunar eclipse on April 29, 888 AD. It contains partial eclipses from July 14, 1014 through March 10, 1411; total eclipses from March 20, 1429 through August 7, 1645; and a second set of partial eclipses from August 18, 1663 through February 21, 1970. The series ends at member 71 as a penumbral eclipse on June 10, 2150.

The longest duration of totality was produced by member 38 at 103 minutes, 6 seconds on June 5, 1555. All eclipses in this series occur at the Moon’s descending node of orbit.

Greatest	First			
The greatest eclipse of the series occurred on 1555 Jun 05, lasting 103 minutes, 6 seconds.	Penumbral	Partial	Total	Central
The greatest eclipse of the series occurred on 1555 Jun 05, lasting 103 minutes, 6 seconds.	888 Apr 29	1014 Jul 14	1429 Mar 20	1483 Apr 22
The greatest eclipse of the series occurred on 1555 Jun 05, lasting 103 minutes, 6 seconds.	Last			
The greatest eclipse of the series occurred on 1555 Jun 05, lasting 103 minutes, 6 seconds.	Central	Total	Partial	Penumbral
The greatest eclipse of the series occurred on 1555 Jun 05, lasting 103 minutes, 6 seconds.	1609 Jul 16	1645 Aug 07	1970 Feb 21	2150 Jun 10

Eclipses are tabulated in three columns; every third eclipse in the same column is one exeligmos apart, so they all cast shadows over approximately the same parts of the Earth.

Series members 52–71 occur between 1801 and 2150:
52	53	54
1807 Nov 15	1825 Nov 25	1843 Dec 07
55	56	57
1861 Dec 17	1879 Dec 28	1898 Jan 08
58	59	60
1916 Jan 20	1934 Jan 30	1952 Feb 11
61	62	63
1970 Feb 21	1988 Mar 03	2006 Mar 14
64	65	66
2024 Mar 25	2042 Apr 05	2060 Apr 15
67	68	69
2078 Apr 27	2096 May 07	2114 May 19
70	71	
2132 May 30	2150 Jun 10	

=== Tritos series ===
This eclipse is a part of a tritos cycle, repeating at alternating nodes every 135 synodic months (≈ 3986.63 days, or 11 years minus 1 month). Their appearance and longitude are irregular due to a lack of synchronization with the anomalistic month (period of perigee), but groupings of 3 tritos cycles (≈ 33 years minus 3 months) come close (≈ 434.044 anomalistic months), so eclipses are similar in these groupings.

Series members between 1835 and 2200
1835 May 12 (Saros 99)	1846 Apr 11 (Saros 100)		1868 Feb 08 (Saros 102)	1879 Jan 08 (Saros 103)
				1933 Aug 05 (Saros 108)
1944 Jul 06 (Saros 109)	1955 Jun 05 (Saros 110)	1966 May 04 (Saros 111)	1977 Apr 04 (Saros 112)	1988 Mar 03 (Saros 113)
1999 Jan 31 (Saros 114)	2009 Dec 31 (Saros 115)	2020 Nov 30 (Saros 116)	2031 Oct 30 (Saros 117)	2042 Sep 29 (Saros 118)
2053 Aug 29 (Saros 119)	2064 Jul 28 (Saros 120)	2075 Jun 28 (Saros 121)	2086 May 28 (Saros 122)	2097 Apr 26 (Saros 123)
2108 Mar 27 (Saros 124)	2119 Feb 25 (Saros 125)	2130 Jan 24 (Saros 126)	2140 Dec 23 (Saros 127)	2151 Nov 24 (Saros 128)
2162 Oct 23 (Saros 129)	2173 Sep 21 (Saros 130)	2184 Aug 21 (Saros 131)	2195 Jul 22 (Saros 132)	

=== Inex series ===
This eclipse is a part of the long period inex cycle, repeating at alternating nodes, every 358 synodic months (≈ 10,571.95 days, or 29 years minus 20 days). Their appearance and longitude are irregular due to a lack of synchronization with the anomalistic month (period of perigee). However, groupings of 3 inex cycles (≈ 87 years minus 2 months) comes close (≈ 1,151.02 anomalistic months), so eclipses are similar in these groupings.

Series members between 1801 and 2200
1814 Jul 02 (Saros 107)	1843 Jun 12 (Saros 108)	1872 May 22 (Saros 109)
1901 May 03 (Saros 110)	1930 Apr 13 (Saros 111)	1959 Mar 24 (Saros 112)
1988 Mar 03 (Saros 113)	2017 Feb 11 (Saros 114)	2046 Jan 22 (Saros 115)
2075 Jan 02 (Saros 116)	2103 Dec 13 (Saros 117)	2132 Nov 23 (Saros 118)
2161 Nov 03 (Saros 119)	2190 Oct 13 (Saros 120)	

=== Half-Saros cycle ===
A lunar eclipse will be preceded and followed by solar eclipses by 9 years and 5.5 days (a half saros). This lunar eclipse is related to two total solar eclipses of Solar Saros 120.

February 26, 1979	March 9, 1997

== See also ==
- List of lunar eclipses
- List of 20th-century lunar eclipses
