= Total penumbral lunar eclipse =

Type of lunar eclipse

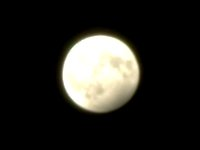
The penumbral lunar eclipse on March 14, 2006 was a total penumbral eclipse.

A total penumbral lunar eclipse is a lunar eclipse that occurs when the Moon is covered in penumbral cone of Earth's shadow, not the umbra.

The path for the Moon to pass within the penumbra and outside the umbra is very narrow. It can only happen on the Earth's northern or southern penumbral edges. In addition, the size of the penumbra is sometimes too small where the Moon enters it to contain the Moon. The width of the Earth's penumbra is determined by the Sun's angular diameter at the time of the eclipse, and the Moon's angular diameter is larger than the Sun over part of its elliptical orbit, depending on whether the eclipse occurs at the nearest (perigee) or farthest point (apogee) in its orbit around the Earth. The majority of the time, the size of the Moon and the size of the Earth's penumbra where the Moon crosses it mean that most eclipses will not be total penumbral in nature.

== Frequency ==
Total penumbral eclipses constitute a relatively small fraction of lunar eclipses, and the distribution of these events is uneven, occurring between 0 and 9 times per century. The period of this variation is approximately 600 years and also correlates with the frequency of total umbral eclipses and tetrads.

The maximum number in Fred's 5K canon (Note: Total penumbral lunar eclipses are indicated by the Nx eclipse type in Fred Espenak's Lunar Eclipse canon.) is eight for saros 19. Saros 32 and 132 have seven. Saros 58, 95, and 114 have six.

Saros 114 is the only saros in the canon to have a total of seven total penumbral lunar eclipses that are not all in a row. Likewise, saros 169 has five total penumbral eclipses, but only four of them occur consecutively.

=== Saros series with multiple consecutive total penumbral eclipses ===
This table summarizes which saros series contain four or more consecutive total penumbral eclipses.

Saros series	Consecutive total penumbral eclipses
-339	7
-266	13
-258	9
-247	10
-237	10
-226	10
-218	12
-157	6
-118	4
-116	7
-105	11
-39	9
-37	6
-26	9
19	8
32	7
58	6
95	6
114 (Note: Saros 114 has seven total penumbral eclipses, but only six of them occur consecutively.)	6
132	7
169 (Note: Saros 169 has five total penumbral eclipses, but only four of them occur consecutively.)	4
187	5
255	4

== Summary frequency of total penumbral, total umbral and tetrad events 501–2500 ==
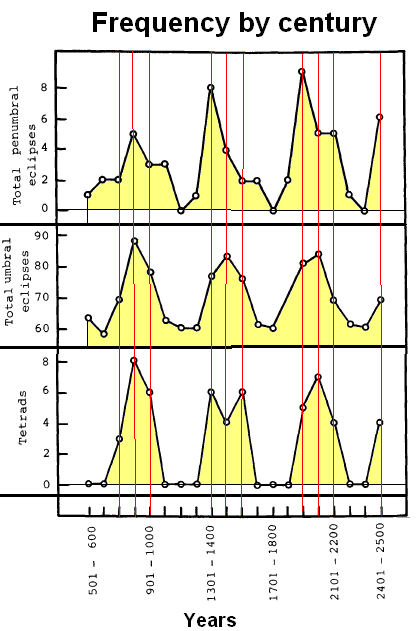
The frequency of total penumbral lunar eclipses varies by century with the frequency of total umbral eclipses. A tetrad is a set of four total umbral eclipses within two years.

Century	Total penumbral	Total umbral	Tetrads
501–600	1	63	0
601–700	2	58	0
701–800	2	69	3
801–900	5	88	8
901–1000	3	78	6
1001–1100	3	62	0
1101–1200	0	60	0
1201–1300	1	60	0
1301–1400	8	77	6
1401–1500	4	83	4
1501–1600	2	76	6
1601–1700	2	61	0
1701–1800	0	60	0
1801–1900	2	62	0
1901–2000	9	81	5
2001–2100	5	84	7
2101–2200	5	69	4
2201–2300	1	61	0
2301–2400	0	60	0
2401–2500	6	69	4

== List of total penumbral lunar eclipse events 1901–2200 ==
Ascending nodes				Descending nodes			
Saros	Date	Viewing	Chart	Saros	Date	Viewing	Chart
110	1901 May 03						
114	1908 Dec 07						
114	1926 Dec 19						
114	1944 Dec 29						
116	1948 Oct 18						
114	1963 Jan 09						
114	1981 Jan 20			113	1988 Mar 03		
114	1999 Jan 31			113	2006 Mar 14		
				119	2053 Aug 29		
142	2070 Apr 25						
120	2082 Aug 08						
148	2099 Sep 29						
				145	2103 Jan 23		
				145	2121 Feb 02		
				145	2139 Feb 13		

== See also ==
- Lists of lunar eclipses
- List of 21st-century lunar eclipses
- Moon illusion
- Orbit of the Moon
- Solar eclipse
