= December 1991 lunar eclipse =

Partial lunar eclipse in 1991

- Partial eclipse
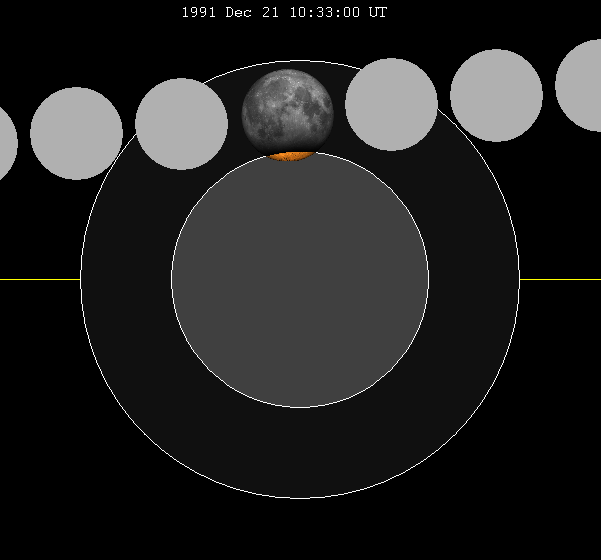
- The Moon's hourly motion shown right to left
- Date: December 21, 1991
- Gamma: 0.9709
- Magnitude: 0.0876
- Saros cycle: 115 (56 of 72)
- Partiality: 64 minutes, 4 seconds
- Penumbral: 251 minutes, 29 seconds
Contacts (UTC)
- P1: 8:27:18
- U1: 10:01:02
- Greatest: 10:33:01
- U4: 11:15:06
- P4: 12:38:46

A partial lunar eclipse occurred at the Moon’s descending node of orbit on Saturday, December 21, 1991, with an umbral magnitude of 0.0876. A lunar eclipse occurs when the Moon moves into the Earth's shadow, causing the Moon to be darkened. A partial lunar eclipse occurs when one part of the Moon is in the Earth's umbra, while the other part is in the Earth's penumbra. Unlike a solar eclipse, which can only be viewed from a relatively small area of the world, a lunar eclipse may be viewed from anywhere on the night side of Earth. Occurring only about 23 hours before perigee (on December 22, 1991, at 9:25 UTC), the Moon's apparent diameter was larger.

This eclipse was the last of four lunar eclipses in 1991, with the others occurring on January 30 (penumbral), June 27 (penumbral), and July 26 (penumbral).

== Visibility ==
The eclipse was completely visible over northeast Asia, much of North America, and much of the Pacific Ocean, seen rising over central, south, and east Asia, and Australia and setting over South America and northern Europe.

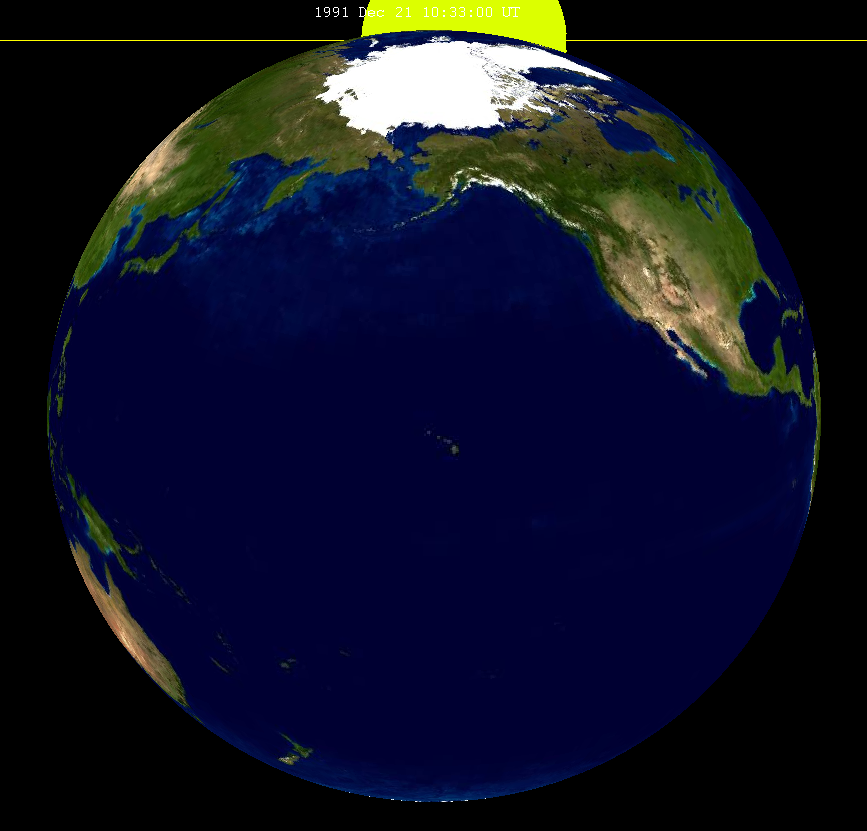
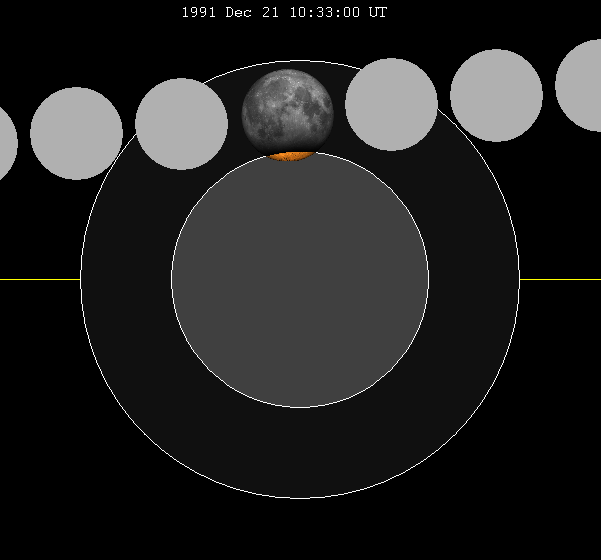

== Eclipse details ==
Shown below is a table displaying details about this particular solar eclipse. It describes various parameters pertaining to this eclipse.

December 21, 1991 Lunar Eclipse Parameters
Parameter	Value
Penumbral Magnitude	1.06511
Umbral Magnitude	0.08762
Gamma	0.97094
Sun Right Ascension	17h55m52.1s
Sun Declination	-23°26'13.9"
Sun Semi-Diameter	16'15.5"
Sun Equatorial Horizontal Parallax	08.9"
Moon Right Ascension	05h56m15.5s
Moon Declination	+24°25'15.3"
Moon Semi-Diameter	16'38.0"
Moon Equatorial Horizontal Parallax	1°01'02.6"
ΔT	58.3 s

== Eclipse season ==
This eclipse is part of an eclipse season, a period, roughly every six months, when eclipses occur. Only two (or occasionally three) eclipse seasons occur each year, and each season lasts about 35 days and repeats just short of six months (173 days) later; thus two full eclipse seasons always occur each year. Either two or three eclipses happen each eclipse season. In the sequence below, each eclipse is separated by a fortnight.

Eclipse season of December 1991–January 1992
December 21 Descending node (full moon)	January 4 Ascending node (new moon)
Partial lunar eclipse Lunar Saros 115	Annular solar eclipse Solar Saros 141

== Related eclipses ==
=== Eclipses in 1991 ===
- An annular solar eclipse on January 15.
- A penumbral lunar eclipse on January 30.
- A penumbral lunar eclipse on June 27.
- A total solar eclipse on July 11.
- A penumbral lunar eclipse on July 26.
- A partial lunar eclipse on December 21.

=== Metonic ===
- Preceded by: Lunar eclipse of March 3, 1988
- Followed by: Lunar eclipse of October 8, 1995

=== Tzolkinex ===
- Preceded by: Lunar eclipse of November 8, 1984
- Followed by: Lunar eclipse of January 31, 1999

=== Half-Saros ===
- Preceded by: Solar eclipse of December 15, 1982
- Followed by: Solar eclipse of December 25, 2000

=== Tritos ===
- Preceded by: Lunar eclipse of January 20, 1981
- Followed by: Lunar eclipse of November 20, 2002

=== Lunar Saros 115 ===
- Preceded by: Lunar eclipse of December 10, 1973
- Followed by: Lunar eclipse of December 31, 2009

=== Inex ===
- Preceded by: Lunar eclipse of January 9, 1963
- Followed by: Lunar eclipse of November 30, 2020

=== Triad ===
- Preceded by: Lunar eclipse of February 19, 1905
- Followed by: Lunar eclipse of October 21, 2078

=== Lunar eclipses of 1991–1994 ===
This eclipse is a member of a semester series. An eclipse in a semester series of lunar eclipses repeats approximately every 177 days and 4 hours (a semester) at alternating nodes of the Moon's orbit.

The penumbral lunar eclipses on January 30, 1991 and July 26, 1991 occur in the previous lunar year eclipse set.

Lunar eclipse series sets from 1991 to 1994
Ascending node				Descending node			
Saros	Date Viewing	Type Chart	Gamma	Saros	Date Viewing	Type Chart	Gamma
110	1991 Jun 27	Penumbral	−1.4064	115	1991 Dec 21	Partial	0.9709
120	1992 Jun 15	Partial	−0.6289	125	1992 Dec 09	Total	0.3144
130	1993 Jun 04	Total	0.1638	135	1993 Nov 29	Total	−0.3994
140	1994 May 25	Partial	0.8933	145	1994 Nov 18	Penumbral	−1.1048

=== Metonic series ===
The Metonic cycle repeats nearly exactly every 19 years and represents a Saros cycle plus one lunar year. Because it occurs on the same calendar date, the Earth's shadow will be in nearly the same location relative to the background stars.

Ascending node	Descending node
1. 1991 Jun 27 - penumbral (110); 2. 2010 Jun 26 - partial (120); 3. 2029 Jun 26 - total (130); 4. 2048 Jun 26 - partial (140); 5. 2067 Jun 27 - penumbral (150)	1. 1991 Dec 21 - partial (115); 2. 2010 Dec 21 - total (125); 3. 2029 Dec 20 - total (135); 4. 2048 Dec 20 - partial (145)

=== Saros 115 ===
This eclipse is a part of Saros series 115, repeating every 18 years, 11 days, and containing 72 events. The series started with a penumbral lunar eclipse on April 21, 1000. It contains partial eclipses from July 6, 1126 through September 30, 1270; total eclipses from October 11, 1288 through July 20, 1739; and a second set of partial eclipses from July 30, 1757 through February 13, 2082. The series ends at member 72 as a penumbral eclipse on June 13, 2280.

The longest duration of totality was produced by member 36 at 99 minutes, 47 seconds on May 15, 1631. All eclipses in this series occur at the Moon’s descending node of orbit.

Greatest	First			
The greatest eclipse of the series occurred on 1631 May 15, lasting 99 minutes, 47 seconds.	Penumbral	Partial	Total	Central
The greatest eclipse of the series occurred on 1631 May 15, lasting 99 minutes, 47 seconds.	1000 Apr 21	1126 Jul 06	1288 Oct 11	1541 Mar 12
The greatest eclipse of the series occurred on 1631 May 15, lasting 99 minutes, 47 seconds.	Last			
The greatest eclipse of the series occurred on 1631 May 15, lasting 99 minutes, 47 seconds.	Central	Total	Partial	Penumbral
The greatest eclipse of the series occurred on 1631 May 15, lasting 99 minutes, 47 seconds.	1685 Jun 16	1739 Jul 20	2082 Feb 13	2280 Jun 13

Eclipses are tabulated in three columns; every third eclipse in the same column is one exeligmos apart, so they all cast shadows over approximately the same parts of the Earth.

Series members 46–67 occur between 1801 and 2200:
46	47	48
1811 Sep 02	1829 Sep 13	1847 Sep 24
49	50	51
1865 Oct 04	1883 Oct 16	1901 Oct 27
52	53	54
1919 Nov 07	1937 Nov 18	1955 Nov 29
55	56	57
1973 Dec 10	1991 Dec 21	2009 Dec 31
58	59	60
2028 Jan 12	2046 Jan 22	2064 Feb 02
61	62	63
2082 Feb 13	2100 Feb 24	2118 Mar 07
64	65	66
2136 Mar 18	2154 Mar 29	2172 Apr 09
67
2190 Apr 20

=== Tritos series ===
This eclipse is a part of a tritos cycle, repeating at alternating nodes every 135 synodic months (≈ 3986.63 days, or 11 years minus 1 month). Their appearance and longitude are irregular due to a lack of synchronization with the anomalistic month (period of perigee), but groupings of 3 tritos cycles (≈ 33 years minus 3 months) come close (≈ 434.044 anomalistic months), so eclipses are similar in these groupings.

Series members between 1817 and 2200
1817 May 01 (Saros 99)	1828 Mar 31 (Saros 100)	1839 Feb 28 (Saros 101)	1850 Jan 28 (Saros 102)	1860 Dec 28 (Saros 103)
		1893 Sep 25 (Saros 106)		1915 Jul 26 (Saros 108)
1926 Jun 25 (Saros 109)	1937 May 25 (Saros 110)	1948 Apr 23 (Saros 111)	1959 Mar 24 (Saros 112)	1970 Feb 21 (Saros 113)
1981 Jan 20 (Saros 114)	1991 Dec 21 (Saros 115)	2002 Nov 20 (Saros 116)	2013 Oct 18 (Saros 117)	2024 Sep 18 (Saros 118)
2035 Aug 19 (Saros 119)	2046 Jul 18 (Saros 120)	2057 Jun 17 (Saros 121)	2068 May 17 (Saros 122)	2079 Apr 16 (Saros 123)
2090 Mar 15 (Saros 124)	2101 Feb 14 (Saros 125)	2112 Jan 14 (Saros 126)	2122 Dec 13 (Saros 127)	2133 Nov 12 (Saros 128)
2144 Oct 11 (Saros 129)	2155 Sep 11 (Saros 130)	2166 Aug 11 (Saros 131)	2177 Jul 11 (Saros 132)	2188 Jun 09 (Saros 133)
2199 May 10 (Saros 134)

=== Inex series ===
This eclipse is a part of the long period inex cycle, repeating at alternating nodes, every 358 synodic months (≈ 10,571.95 days, or 29 years minus 20 days). Their appearance and longitude are irregular due to a lack of synchronization with the anomalistic month (period of perigee). However, groupings of 3 inex cycles (≈ 87 years minus 2 months) comes close (≈ 1,151.02 anomalistic months), so eclipses are similar in these groupings.

Series members between 1801 and 2200
1818 Apr 21 (Saros 109)	1847 Mar 31 (Saros 110)	1876 Mar 10 (Saros 111)
1905 Feb 19 (Saros 112)	1934 Jan 30 (Saros 113)	1963 Jan 09 (Saros 114)
1991 Dec 21 (Saros 115)	2020 Nov 30 (Saros 116)	2049 Nov 09 (Saros 117)
2078 Oct 21 (Saros 118)	2107 Oct 02 (Saros 119)	2136 Sep 10 (Saros 120)
2165 Aug 21 (Saros 121)	2194 Aug 02 (Saros 122)	

=== Half-Saros cycle ===
A lunar eclipse will be preceded and followed by solar eclipses by 9 years and 5.5 days (a half saros). This lunar eclipse is related to two partial solar eclipses of Solar Saros 122.

December 15, 1982	December 25, 2000

== See also ==
- List of lunar eclipses
- List of 20th-century lunar eclipses
