= Lunar Saros 113 =

Member 63	Member 64
2006 Mar 14	2024 Mar 25

Saros cycle series 113 for lunar eclipses occurs at the moon's descending node, repeats every 18 years 11 and 1/3 days. It contains 71 events.

== List ==
Cat.	Saros	Mem	Date	Time UT (hr:mn)	Type	Gamma	Magnitude	Duration (min)			Contacts UT (hr:mn)						Chart
Cat.	Saros	Mem	Date	Greatest	Type	Gamma	Magnitude	Pen.	Par.	Tot.	P1	P4	U1	U2	U3	U4	Chart
06961	113	1	888 Apr 29	19:18:38	Penumbral	-1.5015	-0.8702	72.8			18:42:14	19:55:02					
07003	113	2	906 May 11	2:52:46	Penumbral	-1.4355	-0.7479	115.9			1:54:49	3:50:43					
07043	113	3	924 May 21	10:22:51	Penumbral	-1.3660	-0.6195	146.9			9:09:24	11:36:18					
07084	113	4	942 Jun 01	17:51:08	Penumbral	-1.2946	-0.4880	172.0			16:25:08	19:17:08					
07125	113	5	960 Jun 12	1:18:14	Penumbral	-1.2222	-0.3550	193.0			23:41:44	2:54:44					
07166	113	6	978 Jun 23	8:46:20	Penumbral	-1.1506	-0.2237	210.8			7:00:56	10:31:44					
07208	113	7	996 Jul 03	16:14:11	Penumbral	-1.0788	-0.0924	226.4			14:20:59	18:07:23					
07252	113	8	1014 Jul 14	23:45:44	Partial	-1.0101	0.0329	239.7	39.3		21:45:53	1:45:35	23:26:05			0:05:23	
07296	113	9	1032 Jul 25	7:19:48	Partial	-0.9439	0.1534	251.2	83.6		5:14:12	9:25:24	6:38:00			8:01:36	
07341	113	10	1050 Aug 05	14:59:51	Partial	-0.8826	0.2645	261.0	108.2		12:49:21	17:10:21	14:05:45			15:53:57	
07385	113	11	1068 Aug 15	22:43:39	Partial	-0.8248	0.3689	269.4	125.9		20:28:57	0:58:21	21:40:42			23:46:36	
07429	113	12	1086 Aug 27	6:35:39	Partial	-0.7742	0.4600	276.3	138.8		4:17:30	8:53:48	5:26:15			7:45:03	
07475	113	13	1104 Sep 6	14:33:30	Partial	-0.7288	0.5414	282.3	148.9		12:12:21	16:54:39	13:19:03			15:47:57	
07521	113	14	1122 Sep 17	22:39:18	Partial	-0.6902	0.6101	287.1	156.5		20:15:45	1:02:51	21:21:03			23:57:33	
07567	113	15	1140 Sep 28	6:51:51	Partial	-0.6576	0.6678	291.2	162.4		4:26:15	9:17:27	5:30:39			8:13:03	
07614	113	16	1158 Oct 9	15:12:42	Partial	-0.632	0.7127	294.5	166.8		12:45:27	17:39:57	13:49:18			16:36:06	
07661	113	17	1176 Oct 19	23:40:14	Partial	-0.6126	0.7462	297.1	169.9		21:11:41	2:08:47	22:15:17			1:05:11	
07707	113	18	1194 Oct 31	8:13:30	Partial	-0.5981	0.7709	299.3	172.2		5:43:51	10:43:09	6:47:24			9:39:36	
07753	113	19	1212 Nov 10	16:52:49	Partial	-0.5890	0.7856	300.9	173.7		14:22:22	19:23:16	15:25:58			18:19:40	
07800	113	20	1230 Nov 22	1:36:20	Partial	-0.5834	0.7943	302.3	174.7		23:05:11	4:07:29	0:08:59			3:03:41	
07845	113	21	1248 Dec 02	10:22:46	Partial	-0.5810	0.7974	303.4	175.3		7:51:04	12:54:28	8:55:07			11:50:25	
07890	113	22	1266 Dec 13	19:09:37	Partial	-0.5792	0.7995	304.4	175.8		16:37:25	21:41:49	17:41:43			20:37:31	
07935	113	23	1284 Dec 24	3:56:38	Partial	-0.5781	0.8005	305.3	176.2		1:23:59	6:29:17	2:28:32			5:24:44	
07980	113	24	1303 Jan 04	12:41:28	Partial	-0.5756	0.8044	306.4	176.9		10:08:16	15:14:40	11:13:01			14:09:55	
08023	113	25	1321 Jan 14	21:22:17	Partial	-0.5704	0.8135	307.6	178.0		18:48:29	23:56:05	19:53:17			22:51:17	
08065	113	26	1339 Jan 26	5:58:09	Partial	-0.5615	0.8295	309.2	179.7		3:23:33	8:32:45	4:28:18			7:28:00	
08107	113	27	1357 Feb 05	14:27:27	Partial	-0.5479	0.8542	311.1	182.1		11:51:54	17:03:00	12:56:24			15:58:30	
08148	113	28	1375 Feb 16	22:49:15	Partial	-0.5287	0.8894	313.5	185.1		20:12:30	1:26:00	21:16:42			0:21:48	
08189	113	29	1393 Feb 27	7:02:14	Partial	-0.5028	0.9370	316.3	188.9		4:24:05	9:40:23	5:27:47			8:36:41	
08230	113	30	1411 Mar 10	15:06:37	Partial	-0.4704	0.9965	319.5	193.3		12:26:52	17:46:22	13:29:58			16:43:16	
08272	113	31	1429 Mar 20	23:02:11	Total	-0.4312	1.0683	323.0	198.1	39.5	20:20:41	1:43:41	21:23:08	22:42:26	23:21:56	0:41:14	
08314	113	32	1447 Apr 01	6:47:26	Total	-0.3842	1.1546	326.8	203.2	58.1	4:04:02	9:30:50	5:05:50	6:18:23	7:16:29	8:29:02	
08355	113	33	1465 Apr 11	14:24:28	Total	-0.3312	1.2517	330.6	208.2	72.0	11:39:10	17:09:46	12:40:22	13:48:28	15:00:28	16:08:34	
08395	113	34	1483 Apr 22	21:52:19	Total	-0.2713	1.3612	334.4	212.9	83.2	19:05:07	0:39:31	20:05:52	21:10:43	22:33:55	23:38:46	
08435	113	35	1501 May 3	5:13:26	Total	-0.2064	1.4797	337.8	217.0	91.9	2:24:32	8:02:20	3:24:56	4:27:29	5:59:23	7:01:56	
08475	113	36	1519 May 14	12:25:26	Total	-0.1349	1.6101	340.8	220.4	98.3	9:35:02	15:15:50	10:35:14	11:36:17	13:14:35	14:15:38	
08516	113	37	1537 May 24	19:33:13	Total	-0.0608	1.7451	343.3	222.7	102.1	16:41:34	22:24:52	17:41:52	18:42:10	20:24:16	21:24:34	
08558	113	38	1555 Jun 05	2:34:54	Total	0.0172	1.8238	345.0	223.7	103.1	23:42:24	5:27:24	0:43:03	1:43:21	3:26:27	4:26:45	
08601	113	39	1573 Jun 15	9:34:00	Total	0.0964	1.6770	345.9	223.4	101.1	6:41:03	12:26:57	7:42:18	8:43:27	10:24:33	11:25:42	
08644	113	40	1591 Jul 06	16:29:29	Total	0.1776	1.5260	345.9	221.6	95.7	13:36:32	19:22:26	14:38:41	15:41:38	17:17:20	18:20:17	
08688	113	41	1609 Jul 16	23:25:49	Total	0.2570	1.3783	345.0	218.3	86.3	20:33:19	2:18:19	21:36:40	22:42:40	0:08:58	1:14:58	
08733	113	42	1627 Jul 28	6:21:40	Total	0.3356	1.2317	343.3	213.5	71.4	3:30:01	9:13:19	4:34:55	5:45:58	6:57:22	8:08:25	
08777	113	43	1645 Aug 07	13:19:26	Total	0.4115	1.0899	340.8	207.1	46.7	10:29:02	16:09:50	11:35:53	12:56:05	13:42:47	15:02:59	
08822	113	44	1663 Aug 18	20:20:08	Partial	0.4840	0.9543	337.6	199.4		17:31:20	23:08:56	18:40:26			21:59:50	
08868	113	45	1681 Aug 29	3:25:58	Partial	0.5511	0.8282	334.0	190.6		0:38:58	6:12:58	1:50:40			5:01:16	
08914	113	46	1699 Sep 09	10:37:10	Partial	0.6130	0.7117	330.0	180.7		7:52:10	13:22:10	9:06:49			12:07:31	
08960	113	47	1717 Sep 20	17:54:25	Partial	0.6690	0.6059	325.9	170.2		15:11:28	20:37:22	16:29:19			19:19:31	
09007	113	48	1735 Oct 02	1:19:13	Partial	0.7178	0.5134	322.1	159.4		22:38:10	4:00:16	23:59:31			2:38:55	
09054	113	49	1753 Oct 12	8:51:29	Partial	0.7597	0.4333	318.5	148.7		6:12:14	11:30:44	7:37:08			10:05:50	
09100	113	50	1771 Oct 23	16:30:23	Partial	0.7955	0.3649	315.3	138.3		13:52:44	19:08:02	15:21:14			17:39:32	
09145	113	51	1789 Nov 03	0:17:06	Partial	0.8242	0.3094	312.7	128.7		21:40:45	2:53:27	23:12:45			1:21:27	
09190	113	52	1807 Nov 15	8:09:59	Partial	0.8473	0.2646	310.7	120.1		5:34:38	10:45:20	7:09:56			9:10:02	
09235	113	53	1825 Nov 25	16:09:25	Partial	0.8643	0.2311	309.4	113.0		13:34:43	18:44:07	15:12:55			17:05:55	
09282	113	54	1843 Dec 07	0:11:31	Partial	0.8785	0.2031	308.3	106.6		21:37:22	2:45:40	23:18:13			1:04:49	
09327	113	55	1861 Dec 17	8:18:43	Partial	0.8880	0.1840	307.8	101.9		5:44:49	10:52:37	7:27:46			9:09:40	
09371	113	56	1879 Dec 28	16:26:22	Partial	0.8969	0.1664	307.2	97.4		13:52:46	18:59:58	15:37:40			17:15:04	
09415	113	57	1898 Jan 08	0:34:46	Partial	0.9046	0.1515	306.7	93.3		22:01:25	3:08:07	23:48:07			1:21:25	
09457	113	58	1916 Jan 20	8:39:41	Partial	0.9146	0.1327	305.7	87.7		6:06:50	11:12:32	7:55:50			9:23:32	
09499	113	59	1934 Jan 30	16:42:42	Partial	0.9258	0.1120	304.3	80.9		14:10:33	19:14:51	16:02:15			17:23:09	
09540	113	60	1952 Feb 11	0:39:48	Partial	0.9416	0.0832	301.9	70.1		22:08:51	3:10:45	0:04:45			1:14:51	
09581	113	61	1970 Feb 21	8:30:43	Partial	0.9619	0.0463	298.5	52.7		6:01:28	10:59:58	8:04:22			8:57:04	
09622	113	62	1988 Mar 03	16:13:41	Penumbral	0.9885	-0.0017	293.8			13:46:47	18:40:35					
09663	113	63	2006 Mar 14	23:48:34	Penumbral	1.0210	-0.0604	287.5			21:24:49	2:12:19					
09704	113	64	2024 Mar 25	7:13:59	Penumbral	1.0609	-0.1325	279.1			4:54:26	9:33:32					
09745	113	65	2042 Apr 05	14:30:11	Penumbral	1.1080	-0.2176	268.4			12:15:59	16:44:23					
09785	113	66	2060 Apr 15	21:37:04	Penumbral	1.1621	-0.3156	255.0			19:29:34	23:44:34					
09826	113	67	2078 Apr 27	4:35:44	Penumbral	1.2222	-0.4246	238.2			2:36:38	6:34:50					
09867	113	68	2096 May 07	11:24:42	Penumbral	1.2896	-0.5469	216.9			9:36:15	13:13:09					
09909	113	69	2114 May 19	18:07:33	Penumbral	1.3611	-0.6770	190.1			16:32:30	19:42:36					
09951	113	70	2132 May 30	0:42:50	Penumbral	1.4380	-0.8169	154.4			23:25:38	2:00:02					
09995	113	71	2150 Jun 10	7:14:48	Penumbral	1.5171	-0.9612	102.4			6:23:36	8:06:00					

== See also ==
- List of lunar eclipses
  - List of Saros series for lunar eclipses
