= March 2006 lunar eclipse =

Penumbral lunar eclipse 14 March 2006

- Penumbral eclipse
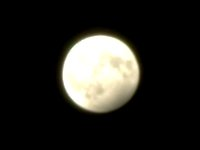
- Penumbral eclipse as viewed from Trondheim, Norway, 23:49 UTC
- Date: March 14, 2006
- Gamma: 1.0210
- Magnitude: −0.0584
- Saros cycle: 113 (63 of 71)
- Penumbral: 287 minutes, 27 seconds
Contacts (UTC)
- P1: 21:23:45
- Greatest: 23:47:29
- P4: 2:11:12

A penumbral lunar eclipse occurred at the Moon’s descending node of orbit on Tuesday, March 14, 2006, with an umbral magnitude of −0.0584. It was a relatively rare total penumbral lunar eclipse, with the Moon passing entirely within the penumbral shadow without entering the darker umbral shadow. A lunar eclipse occurs when the Moon moves into the Earth's shadow, causing the Moon to be darkened. A penumbral lunar eclipse occurs when part or all of the Moon's near side passes into the Earth's penumbra. Unlike a solar eclipse, which can only be viewed from a relatively small area of the world, a lunar eclipse may be viewed from anywhere on the night side of Earth. Occurring about 2.2 days after apogee (on March 12, 2006, at 20:45 UTC), the Moon's apparent diameter was smaller.

== Visibility ==
The eclipse was completely visible much of Africa, eastern South America, Europe, and west Asia, seen rising over North and South America and setting over much of Asia and western Australia.

Hourly motion shown right to left	The Moon's hourly motion across the Earth's shadow in the constellation of Virgo.
Visibility map

== Images ==
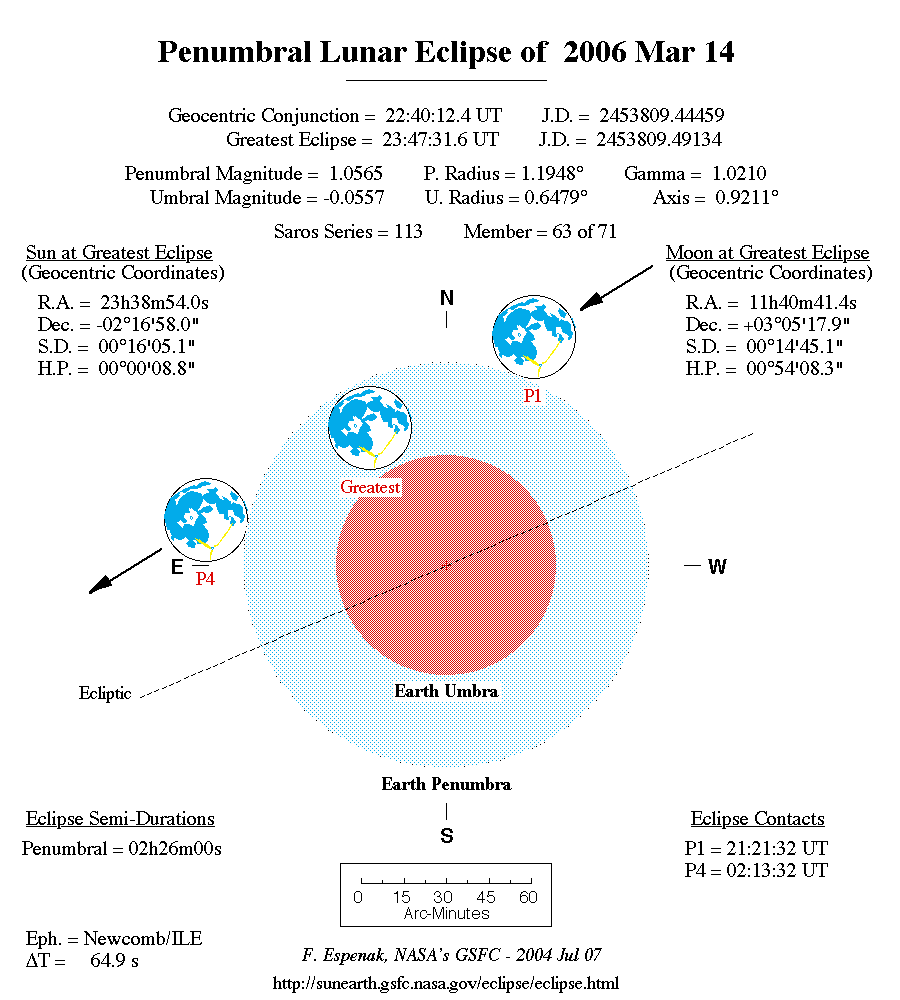
NASA chart of the eclipse

== Eclipse details ==
Shown below is a table displaying details about this particular lunar eclipse. It describes various parameters pertaining to this eclipse.

March 14, 2006 Lunar Eclipse Parameters
Parameter	Value
Penumbral Magnitude	1.03205
Umbral Magnitude	−0.05835
Gamma	1.02106
Sun Right Ascension	23h38m54.0s
Sun Declination	-02°16'57.9"
Sun Semi-Diameter	16'05.1"
Sun Equatorial Horizontal Parallax	08.8"
Moon Right Ascension	11h40m41.4s
Moon Declination	+03°05'17.9"
Moon Semi-Diameter	14'45.1"
Moon Equatorial Horizontal Parallax	0°54'08.3"
ΔT	65.0 s

== Eclipse season ==
This eclipse is part of an eclipse season, a period, roughly every six months, when eclipses occur. Only two (or occasionally three) eclipse seasons occur each year, and each season lasts about 35 days and repeats just short of six months (173 days) later; thus two full eclipse seasons always occur each year. Either two or three eclipses happen each eclipse season. In the sequence below, each eclipse is separated by a fortnight.

Eclipse season of March 2006
March 14 Descending node (full moon)	March 29 Ascending node (new moon)
Penumbral lunar eclipse Lunar Saros 113	Total solar eclipse Solar Saros 139

== Related eclipses ==
=== Eclipses in 2006 ===
- A penumbral lunar eclipse on March 14.
- A total solar eclipse on March 29.
- A partial lunar eclipse on September 7.
- An annular solar eclipse on September 22.

=== Metonic ===
- Preceded by: Lunar eclipse of May 26, 2002
- Followed by: Lunar eclipse of December 31, 2009

=== Tzolkinex ===
- Preceded by: Lunar eclipse of January 31, 1999
- Followed by: Lunar eclipse of April 25, 2013

=== Half-Saros ===
- Preceded by: Solar eclipse of March 9, 1997
- Followed by: Solar eclipse of March 20, 2015

=== Tritos ===
- Preceded by: Lunar eclipse of April 15, 1995
- Followed by: Lunar eclipse of February 11, 2017

=== Lunar Saros 113 ===
- Preceded by: Lunar eclipse of March 3, 1988
- Followed by: Lunar eclipse of March 25, 2024

=== Inex ===
- Preceded by: Lunar eclipse of April 4, 1977
- Followed by: Lunar eclipse of February 22, 2035

=== Triad ===
- Preceded by: Lunar eclipse of May 15, 1919
- Followed by: Lunar eclipse of January 12, 2093

=== Lunar eclipses of 2006–2009 ===
This eclipse is a member of a semester series. An eclipse in a semester series of lunar eclipses repeats approximately every 177 days and 4 hours (a semester) at alternating nodes of the Moon's orbit.

The lunar eclipses on July 7, 2009 (penumbral) and December 31, 2009 (partial) occur in the next lunar year eclipse set.

Lunar eclipse series sets from 2006 to 2009
Descending node				Ascending node			
Saros	Date Viewing	Type Chart	Gamma	Saros	Date Viewing	Type Chart	Gamma
113	2006 Mar 14	Penumbral	1.0211	118	2006 Sep 7	Partial	−0.9262
123	2007 Mar 03	Total	0.3175	128	2007 Aug 28	Total	−0.2146
133	2008 Feb 21	Total	−0.3992	138	2008 Aug 16	Partial	0.5646
143	2009 Feb 09	Penumbral	−1.0640	148	2009 Aug 06	Penumbral	1.3572

=== Metonic series ===
The Metonic cycle repeats nearly exactly every 19 years and represents a Saros cycle plus one lunar year. Because it occurs on the same calendar date, the Earth's shadow will in nearly the same location relative to the background stars.

1. 2006 Mar 14.99 - penumbral (113); 2. 2025 Mar 14.29 - total (123); 3. 2044 Mar 13.82 - total (133); 4. 2063 Mar 14.67- partial (143)	1. 2006 Sep 07.79 - partial (118); 2. 2025 Sep 07.76 - total (128); 3. 2044 Sep 07.47 - partial (138); 4. 2063 Sep 07.86 - penumbral (148)

=== Saros 113 ===
This eclipse is a part of Saros series 113, repeating every 18 years, 11 days, and containing 71 events. The series started with a penumbral lunar eclipse on April 29, 888 AD. It contains partial eclipses from July 14, 1014 through March 10, 1411; total eclipses from March 20, 1429 through August 7, 1645; and a second set of partial eclipses from August 18, 1663 through February 21, 1970. The series ends at member 71 as a penumbral eclipse on June 10, 2150.

The longest duration of totality was produced by member 38 at 103 minutes, 6 seconds on June 5, 1555. All eclipses in this series occur at the Moon’s descending node of orbit.

Greatest	First			
The greatest eclipse of the series occurred on 1555 Jun 05, lasting 103 minutes, 6 seconds.	Penumbral	Partial	Total	Central
The greatest eclipse of the series occurred on 1555 Jun 05, lasting 103 minutes, 6 seconds.	888 Apr 29	1014 Jul 14	1429 Mar 20	1483 Apr 22
The greatest eclipse of the series occurred on 1555 Jun 05, lasting 103 minutes, 6 seconds.	Last			
The greatest eclipse of the series occurred on 1555 Jun 05, lasting 103 minutes, 6 seconds.	Central	Total	Partial	Penumbral
The greatest eclipse of the series occurred on 1555 Jun 05, lasting 103 minutes, 6 seconds.	1609 Jul 16	1645 Aug 07	1970 Feb 21	2150 Jun 10

Eclipses are tabulated in three columns; every third eclipse in the same column is one exeligmos apart, so they all cast shadows over approximately the same parts of the Earth.

Series members 52–71 occur between 1801 and 2150:
52	53	54
1807 Nov 15	1825 Nov 25	1843 Dec 07
55	56	57
1861 Dec 17	1879 Dec 28	1898 Jan 08
58	59	60
1916 Jan 20	1934 Jan 30	1952 Feb 11
61	62	63
1970 Feb 21	1988 Mar 03	2006 Mar 14
64	65	66
2024 Mar 25	2042 Apr 05	2060 Apr 15
67	68	69
2078 Apr 27	2096 May 07	2114 May 19
70	71	
2132 May 30	2150 Jun 10	

=== Tritos series ===
This eclipse is a part of a tritos cycle, repeating at alternating nodes every 135 synodic months (≈ 3986.63 days, or 11 years minus 1 month). Their appearance and longitude are irregular due to a lack of synchronization with the anomalistic month (period of perigee), but groupings of 3 tritos cycles (≈ 33 years minus 3 months) come close (≈ 434.044 anomalistic months), so eclipses are similar in these groupings.

Series members between 1886 and 2200
1886 Feb 18 (Saros 102)	1897 Jan 18 (Saros 103)			
	1951 Aug 17 (Saros 108)	1962 Jul 17 (Saros 109)	1973 Jun 15 (Saros 110)	1984 May 15 (Saros 111)
1995 Apr 15 (Saros 112)	2006 Mar 14 (Saros 113)	2017 Feb 11 (Saros 114)	2028 Jan 12 (Saros 115)	2038 Dec 11 (Saros 116)
2049 Nov 09 (Saros 117)	2060 Oct 09 (Saros 118)	2071 Sep 09 (Saros 119)	2082 Aug 08 (Saros 120)	2093 Jul 08 (Saros 121)
2104 Jun 08 (Saros 122)	2115 May 08 (Saros 123)	2126 Apr 07 (Saros 124)	2137 Mar 07 (Saros 125)	2148 Feb 04 (Saros 126)
2159 Jan 04 (Saros 127)	2169 Dec 04 (Saros 128)	2180 Nov 02 (Saros 129)	2191 Oct 02 (Saros 130)	

=== Inex series ===
This eclipse is a part of the long period inex cycle, repeating at alternating nodes, every 358 synodic months (≈ 10,571.95 days, or 29 years minus 20 days). Their appearance and longitude are irregular due to a lack of synchronization with the anomalistic month (period of perigee). However, groupings of 3 inex cycles (≈ 87 years minus 2 months) comes close (≈ 1,151.02 anomalistic months), so eclipses are similar in these groupings.

Series members between 1801 and 2200
1803 Aug 03 (Saros 106)	1832 Jul 12 (Saros 107)	1861 Jun 22 (Saros 108)
1890 Jun 03 (Saros 109)	1919 May 15 (Saros 110)	1948 Apr 23 (Saros 111)
1977 Apr 04 (Saros 112)	2006 Mar 14 (Saros 113)	2035 Feb 22 (Saros 114)
2064 Feb 02 (Saros 115)	2093 Jan 12 (Saros 116)	2121 Dec 24 (Saros 117)
2150 Dec 04 (Saros 118)	2179 Nov 14 (Saros 119)	

=== Half-Saros cycle ===
A lunar eclipse will be preceded and followed by solar eclipses by 9 years and 5.5 days (a half saros). This lunar eclipse is related to two total solar eclipses of Solar Saros 120.

March 9, 1997	March 20, 2015

== See also ==
- List of lunar eclipses and List of 21st-century lunar eclipses
- May 2003 lunar eclipse
- November 2003 lunar eclipse
- May 2004 lunar eclipse
