= August 1970 lunar eclipse =

Partial lunar eclipse August 17, 1970

- Partial eclipse
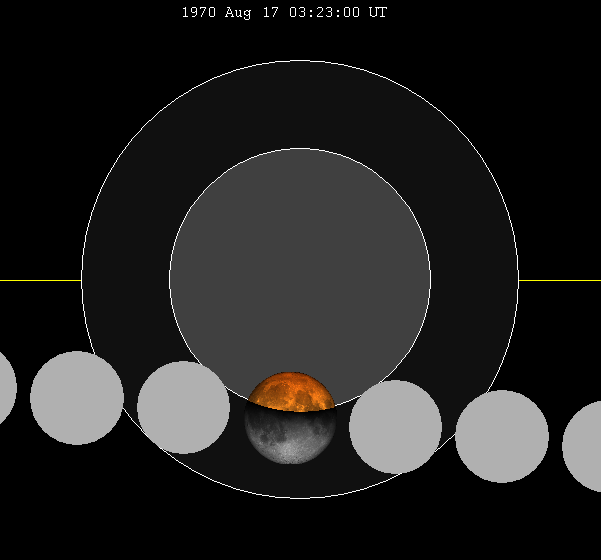
- The Moon's hourly motion shown right to left
- Date: August 17, 1970
- Gamma: −0.8053
- Magnitude: 0.4080
- Saros cycle: 118 (49 of 74)
- Partiality: 132 minutes, 21 seconds
- Penumbral: 270 minutes, 36 seconds
Contacts (UTC)
- P1: 1:08:06
- U1: 2:17:45
- Greatest: 3:23:25
- U4: 4:29:06
- P4: 5:38:42

A partial lunar eclipse occurred at the Moon’s ascending node of orbit on Monday, August 17, 1970, with an umbral magnitude of 0.4080. A lunar eclipse occurs when the Moon moves into the Earth's shadow, causing the Moon to be darkened. A partial lunar eclipse occurs when one part of the Moon is in the Earth's umbra, while the other part is in the Earth's penumbra. Unlike a solar eclipse, which can only be viewed from a relatively small area of the world, a lunar eclipse may be viewed from anywhere on the night side of Earth. Occurring only about 4 hours before perigee (on August 17, 1970, at 7:35 UTC), the Moon's apparent diameter was larger.

== Visibility ==
The eclipse was completely visible over eastern North America, South America, west Africa, and Antarctica, seen rising over western North America and the central Pacific Ocean and setting over Europe, much of Africa, and the Middle East.

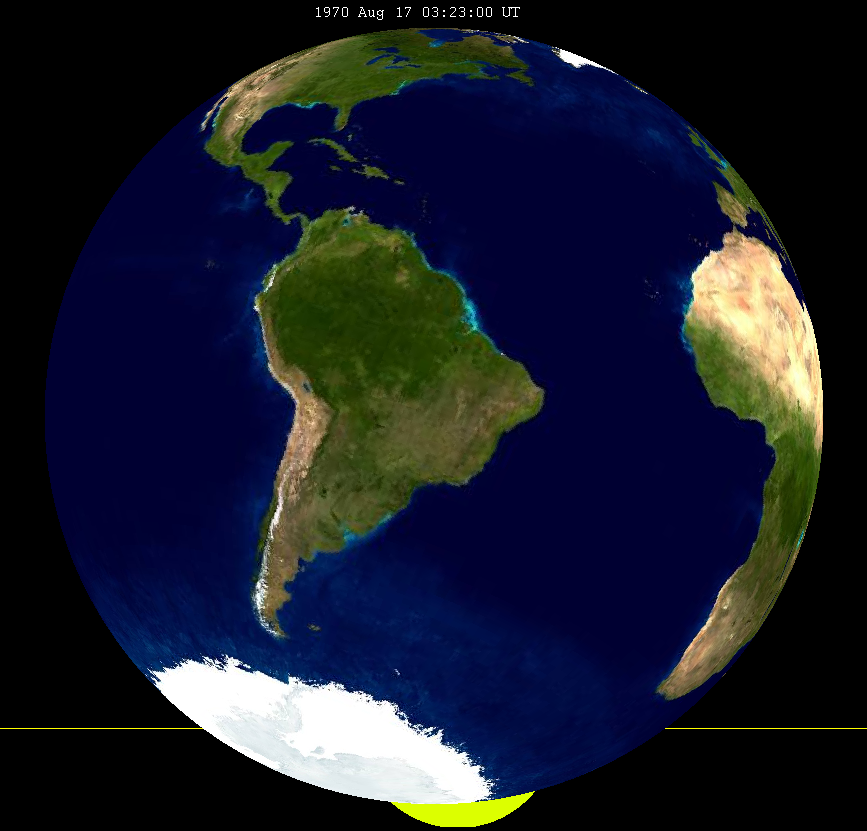
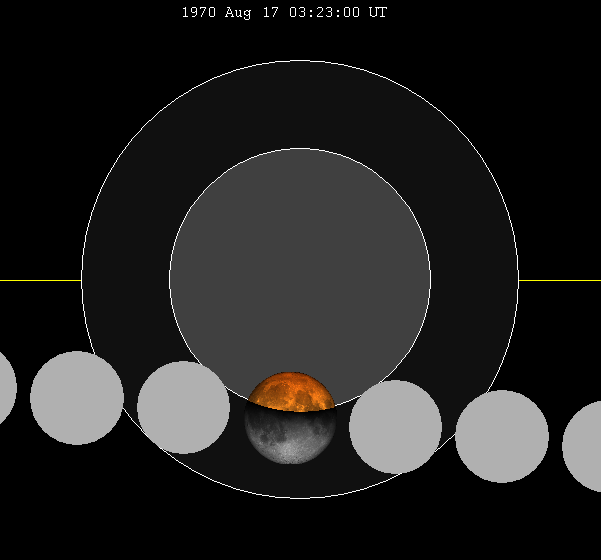

== Eclipse details ==
Shown below is a table displaying details about this particular lunar eclipse. It describes various parameters pertaining to this eclipse.

August 17, 1970 Lunar Eclipse Parameters
Parameter	Value
Penumbral Magnitude	1.35215
Umbral Magnitude	0.40797
Gamma	−0.80534
Sun Right Ascension	09h44m32.9s
Sun Declination	+13°35'06.2"
Sun Semi-Diameter	15'47.9"
Sun Equatorial Horizontal Parallax	08.7"
Moon Right Ascension	21h45m58.7s
Moon Declination	-14°19'57.2"
Moon Semi-Diameter	16'43.9"
Moon Equatorial Horizontal Parallax	1°01'24.5"
ΔT	40.8 s

== Eclipse season ==
This eclipse is part of an eclipse season, a period, roughly every six months, when eclipses occur. Only two (or occasionally three) eclipse seasons occur each year, and each season lasts about 35 days and repeats just short of six months (173 days) later; thus two full eclipse seasons always occur each year. Either two or three eclipses happen each eclipse season. In the sequence below, each eclipse is separated by a fortnight.

Eclipse season of August 1970
August 17 Ascending node (full moon)	August 31 Descending node (new moon)
Partial lunar eclipse Lunar Saros 118	Annular solar eclipse Solar Saros 144

== Related eclipses ==
=== Eclipses in 1970 ===
- A partial lunar eclipse on February 21.
- A total solar eclipse on March 7.
- A partial lunar eclipse on August 17.
- An annular solar eclipse on August 31.

=== Metonic ===
- Preceded by: Lunar eclipse of October 29, 1966
- Followed by: Lunar eclipse of June 4, 1974

=== Tzolkinex ===
- Preceded by: Lunar eclipse of July 6, 1963
- Followed by: Lunar eclipse of September 27, 1977

=== Half-Saros ===
- Preceded by: Solar eclipse of August 11, 1961
- Followed by: Solar eclipse of August 22, 1979

=== Tritos ===
- Preceded by: Lunar eclipse of September 17, 1959
- Followed by: Lunar eclipse of July 17, 1981

=== Lunar Saros 118 ===
- Preceded by: Lunar eclipse of August 5, 1952
- Followed by: Lunar eclipse of August 27, 1988

=== Inex ===
- Preceded by: Lunar eclipse of September 5, 1941
- Followed by: Lunar eclipse of July 28, 1999

=== Triad ===
- Preceded by: Lunar eclipse of October 16, 1883
- Followed by: Lunar eclipse of June 17, 2057

=== Lunar eclipses of 1969–1973 ===
This eclipse is a member of a semester series. An eclipse in a semester series of lunar eclipses repeats approximately every 177 days and 4 hours (a semester) at alternating nodes of the Moon's orbit.

The penumbral lunar eclipses on April 2, 1969 and September 25, 1969 occur in the previous lunar year eclipse set, and the lunar eclipses on June 15, 1973 (penumbral) and December 10, 1973 (partial) occur in the next lunar year eclipse set.

Lunar eclipse series sets from 1969 to 1973
Ascending node				Descending node			
Saros	Date Viewing	Type Chart	Gamma	Saros	Date Viewing	Type Chart	Gamma
108	1969 Aug 27	Penumbral	−1.5407	113	1970 Feb 21	Partial	0.9620
118	1970 Aug 17	Partial	−0.8053	123	1971 Feb 10	Total	0.2741
128	1971 Aug 06	Total	−0.0794	133	1972 Jan 30	Total	−0.4273
138	1972 Jul 26	Partial	0.7117	143	1973 Jan 18	Penumbral	−1.0845
148	1973 Jul 15	Penumbral	1.5178				

=== Metonic series ===
The Metonic cycle repeats nearly exactly every 19 years and represents a Saros cycle plus one lunar year. Because it occurs on the same calendar date, the Earth's shadow will in nearly the same location relative to the background stars.

Metonic lunar eclipse sets 1951–2027
Descending node			Ascending node		
Saros	Date	Type	Saros	Date	Type
103	1951 Feb 21.88	Penumbral	108	1951 Aug 17.13	Penumbral
113	1970 Feb 21.35	Partial	118	1970 Aug 17.14	Partial
123	1989 Feb 20.64	Total	128	1989 Aug 17.13	Total
133	2008 Feb 21.14	Total	138	2008 Aug 16.88	Partial
143	2027 Feb 20.96	Penumbral	148	2027 Aug 17.30	Penumbral

=== Saros 118 ===
This eclipse is a part of Saros series 118, repeating every 18 years, 11 days, and containing 73 events. The series started with a penumbral lunar eclipse on March 2, 1105. It contains partial eclipses from June 8, 1267 through August 12, 1375; total eclipses from August 22, 1393 through June 22, 1880; and a second set of partial eclipses from July 3, 1898 through September 18, 2024. The series ends at member 73 as a penumbral eclipse on May 7, 2403.

The longest duration of totality was produced by member 37 at 99 minutes, 22 seconds on April 7, 1754. All eclipses in this series occur at the Moon’s ascending node of orbit.

Greatest	First			
The greatest eclipse of the series occurred on 1754 Apr 07, lasting 99 minutes, 22 seconds.	Penumbral	Partial	Total	Central
The greatest eclipse of the series occurred on 1754 Apr 07, lasting 99 minutes, 22 seconds.	1105 Mar 02	1267 Jun 08	1393 Aug 22	1465 Oct 04
The greatest eclipse of the series occurred on 1754 Apr 07, lasting 99 minutes, 22 seconds.	Last			
The greatest eclipse of the series occurred on 1754 Apr 07, lasting 99 minutes, 22 seconds.	Central	Total	Partial	Penumbral
The greatest eclipse of the series occurred on 1754 Apr 07, lasting 99 minutes, 22 seconds.	1826 May 21	1880 Jun 22	2024 Sep 18	2403 May 07

Eclipses are tabulated in three columns; every third eclipse in the same column is one exeligmos apart, so they all cast shadows over approximately the same parts of the Earth.

Series members 40–61 occur between 1801 and 2200:
40	41	42
1808 May 10	1826 May 21	1844 May 31
43	44	45
1862 Jun 12	1880 Jun 22	1898 Jul 03
46	47	48
1916 Jul 15	1934 Jul 26	1952 Aug 05
49	50	51
1970 Aug 17	1988 Aug 27	2006 Sep 07
52	53	54
2024 Sep 18	2042 Sep 29	2060 Oct 09
55	56	57
2078 Oct 21	2096 Oct 31	2114 Nov 12
58	59	60
2132 Nov 23	2150 Dec 04	2168 Dec 14
61
2186 Dec 26

=== Tritos series ===
This eclipse is a part of a tritos cycle, repeating at alternating nodes every 135 synodic months (≈ 3986.63 days, or 11 years minus 1 month). Their appearance and longitude are irregular due to a lack of synchronization with the anomalistic month (period of perigee), but groupings of 3 tritos cycles (≈ 33 years minus 3 months) come close (≈ 434.044 anomalistic months), so eclipses are similar in these groupings.

Series members between 1801 and 2200
1806 Nov 26 (Saros 103)		1828 Sep 23 (Saros 105)	1839 Aug 24 (Saros 106)	1850 Jul 24 (Saros 107)
1861 Jun 22 (Saros 108)	1872 May 22 (Saros 109)	1883 Apr 22 (Saros 110)	1894 Mar 21 (Saros 111)	1905 Feb 19 (Saros 112)
1916 Jan 20 (Saros 113)	1926 Dec 19 (Saros 114)	1937 Nov 18 (Saros 115)	1948 Oct 18 (Saros 116)	1959 Sep 17 (Saros 117)
1970 Aug 17 (Saros 118)	1981 Jul 17 (Saros 119)	1992 Jun 15 (Saros 120)	2003 May 16 (Saros 121)	2014 Apr 15 (Saros 122)
2025 Mar 14 (Saros 123)	2036 Feb 11 (Saros 124)	2047 Jan 12 (Saros 125)	2057 Dec 11 (Saros 126)	2068 Nov 09 (Saros 127)
2079 Oct 10 (Saros 128)	2090 Sep 08 (Saros 129)	2101 Aug 09 (Saros 130)	2112 Jul 09 (Saros 131)	2123 Jun 09 (Saros 132)
2134 May 08 (Saros 133)	2145 Apr 07 (Saros 134)	2156 Mar 07 (Saros 135)	2167 Feb 04 (Saros 136)	2178 Jan 04 (Saros 137)
2188 Dec 04 (Saros 138)	2199 Nov 02 (Saros 139)			

=== Inex series ===
This eclipse is a part of the long period inex cycle, repeating at alternating nodes, every 358 synodic months (≈ 10,571.95 days, or 29 years minus 20 days). Their appearance and longitude are irregular due to a lack of synchronization with the anomalistic month (period of perigee). However, groupings of 3 inex cycles (≈ 87 years minus 2 months) comes close (≈ 1,151.02 anomalistic months), so eclipses are similar in these groupings.

Series members between 1801 and 2200
1825 Nov 25 (Saros 113)	1854 Nov 04 (Saros 114)	1883 Oct 16 (Saros 115)
1912 Sep 26 (Saros 116)	1941 Sep 05 (Saros 117)	1970 Aug 17 (Saros 118)
1999 Jul 28 (Saros 119)	2028 Jul 06 (Saros 120)	2057 Jun 17 (Saros 121)
2086 May 28 (Saros 122)	2115 May 08 (Saros 123)	2144 Apr 18 (Saros 124)
2173 Mar 29 (Saros 125)

=== Half-Saros cycle ===
A lunar eclipse will be preceded and followed by solar eclipses by 9 years and 5.5 days (a half saros). This lunar eclipse is related to two annular solar eclipses of Solar Saros 125.

August 11, 1961	August 22, 1979

== See also ==
- List of lunar eclipses
- List of 20th-century lunar eclipses
