= February 1952 lunar eclipse =

Partial lunar eclipse February 11, 1952

- Partial eclipse
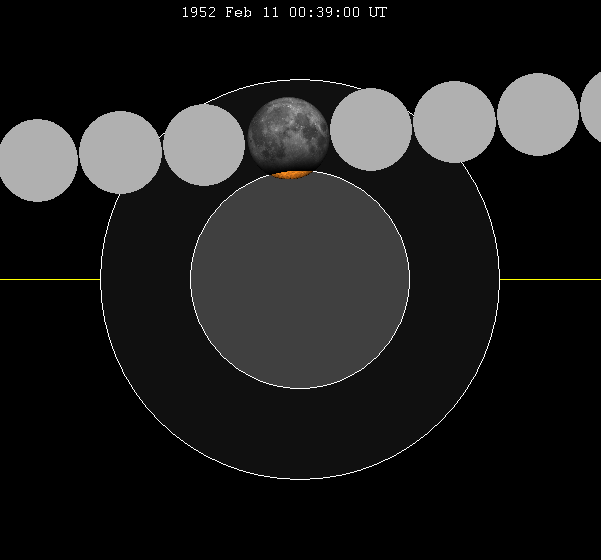
- The Moon's hourly motion shown right to left
- Date: February 11, 1952
- Gamma: 0.9416
- Magnitude: 0.0832
- Saros cycle: 113 (60 of 71)
- Partiality: 70 minutes, 7 seconds
- Penumbral: 301 minutes, 55 seconds
Contacts (UTC)
- P1: 22:08:20
- U1: 0:04:17
- Greatest: 0:39:18
- U4: 1:14:24
- P4: 3:10:15

A partial lunar eclipse occurred at the Moon’s descending node of orbit on Monday, February 11, 1952, with an umbral magnitude of 0.0832. A lunar eclipse occurs when the Moon moves into the Earth's shadow, causing the Moon to be darkened. A partial lunar eclipse occurs when one part of the Moon is in the Earth's umbra, while the other part is in the Earth's penumbra. Unlike a solar eclipse, which can only be viewed from a relatively small area of the world, a lunar eclipse may be viewed from anywhere on the night side of Earth. Occurring about 2.7 days after apogee (on February 8, 1952, at 8:25 UTC), the Moon's apparent diameter was smaller.

== Visibility ==
The eclipse was completely visible over northeastern North America, eastern South America, Europe, Africa, and the Middle East, seen rising over much of North America and western South America and setting over much of Asia.

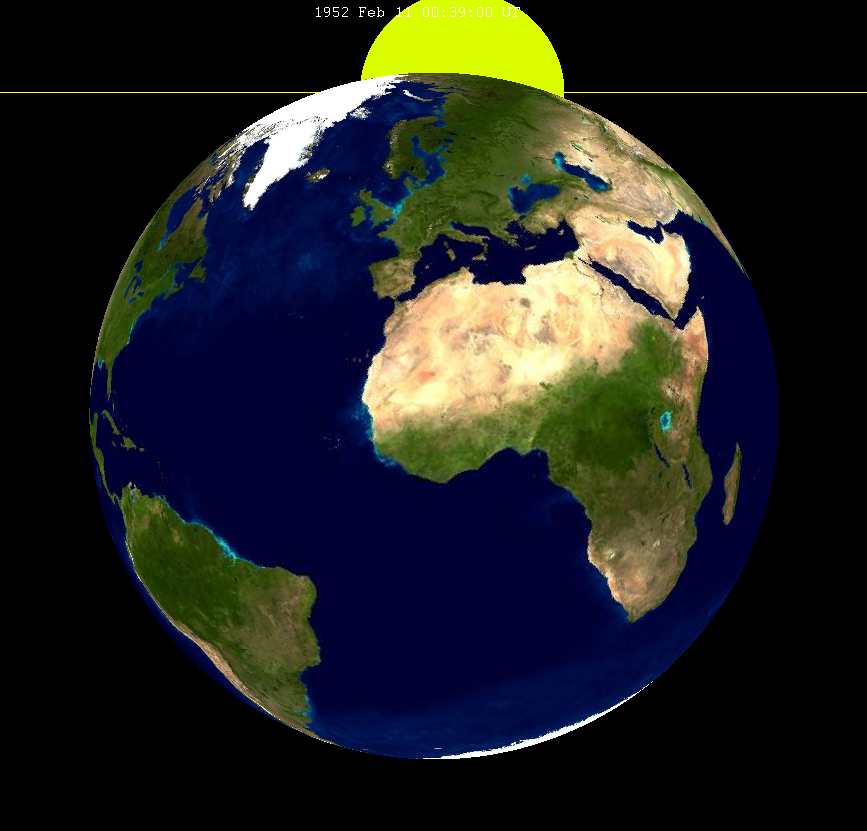
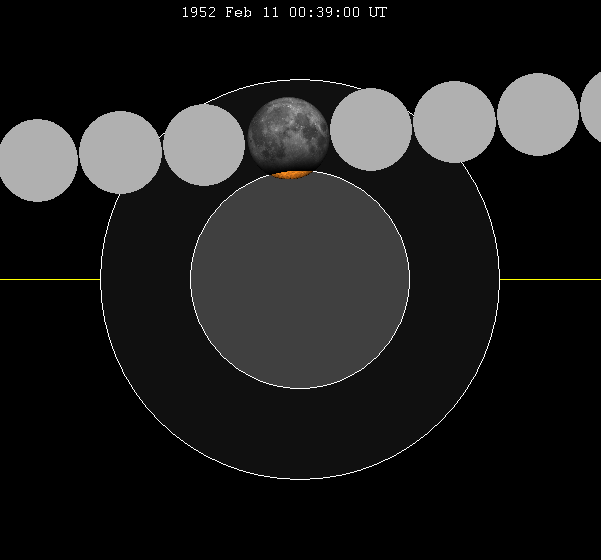

== Eclipse details ==
Shown below is a table displaying details about this particular solar eclipse. It describes various parameters pertaining to this eclipse.

February 11, 1952 Lunar Eclipse Parameters
Parameter	Value
Penumbral Magnitude	1.17816
Umbral Magnitude	0.08323
Gamma	0.94161
Sun Right Ascension	21h34m29.0s
Sun Declination	-14°25'36.6"
Sun Semi-Diameter	16'12.4"
Sun Equatorial Horizontal Parallax	08.9"
Moon Right Ascension	09h35m56.5s
Moon Declination	+15°12'10.8"
Moon Semi-Diameter	14'48.1"
Moon Equatorial Horizontal Parallax	0°54'19.3"
ΔT	29.9 s

== Eclipse season ==
This eclipse is part of an eclipse season, a period, roughly every six months, when eclipses occur. Only two (or occasionally three) eclipse seasons occur each year, and each season lasts about 35 days and repeats just short of six months (173 days) later; thus two full eclipse seasons always occur each year. Either two or three eclipses happen each eclipse season. In the sequence below, each eclipse is separated by a fortnight.

Eclipse season of February 1952
February 11 Descending node (full moon)	February 25 Ascending node (new moon)
Partial lunar eclipse Lunar Saros 113	Total solar eclipse Solar Saros 139

== Related eclipses ==
=== Eclipses in 1952 ===
- A partial lunar eclipse on February 11.
- A total solar eclipse on February 25.
- A partial lunar eclipse on August 5.
- An annular solar eclipse on August 20.

=== Metonic ===
- Preceded by: Lunar eclipse of April 23, 1948
- Followed by: Lunar eclipse of November 29, 1955

=== Tzolkinex ===
- Preceded by: Lunar eclipse of December 29, 1944
- Followed by: Lunar eclipse of March 24, 1959

=== Half-Saros ===
- Preceded by: Solar eclipse of February 4, 1943
- Followed by: Solar eclipse of February 15, 1961

=== Tritos ===
- Preceded by: Lunar eclipse of March 13, 1941
- Followed by: Lunar eclipse of January 9, 1963

=== Lunar Saros 113 ===
- Preceded by: Lunar eclipse of January 30, 1934
- Followed by: Lunar eclipse of February 21, 1970

=== Inex ===
- Preceded by: Lunar eclipse of March 3, 1923
- Followed by: Lunar eclipse of January 20, 1981

=== Triad ===
- Preceded by: Lunar eclipse of April 11, 1865
- Followed by: Lunar eclipse of December 11, 2038

=== Lunar eclipses of 1951–1955 ===
This eclipse is a member of a semester series. An eclipse in a semester series of lunar eclipses repeats approximately every 177 days and 4 hours (a semester) at alternating nodes of the Moon's orbit.

The penumbral lunar eclipses on March 23, 1951 and September 15, 1951 occur in the previous lunar year eclipse set, and the lunar eclipses on June 5, 1955 (penumbral) and November 29, 1955 (partial) occur in the next lunar year eclipse set.

Lunar eclipse series sets from 1951 to 1955
Descending node				Ascending node			
Saros	Date Viewing	Type Chart	Gamma	Saros	Date Viewing	Type Chart	Gamma
103	1951 Feb 21	Penumbral	−	108	1951 Aug 17	Penumbral	−1.4828
113	1952 Feb 11	Partial	0.9416	118	1952 Aug 05	Partial	−0.7384
123	1953 Jan 29	Total	0.2606	128	1953 Jul 26	Total	−0.0071
133	1954 Jan 19	Total	−0.4357	138	1954 Jul 16	Partial	0.7877
143	1955 Jan 08	Penumbral	−1.0907				

=== Saros 113 ===
This eclipse is a part of Saros series 113, repeating every 18 years, 11 days, and containing 71 events. The series started with a penumbral lunar eclipse on April 29, 888 AD. It contains partial eclipses from July 14, 1014 through March 10, 1411; total eclipses from March 20, 1429 through August 7, 1645; and a second set of partial eclipses from August 18, 1663 through February 21, 1970. The series ends at member 71 as a penumbral eclipse on June 10, 2150.

The longest duration of totality was produced by member 38 at 103 minutes, 6 seconds on June 5, 1555. All eclipses in this series occur at the Moon’s descending node of orbit.

Greatest	First			
The greatest eclipse of the series occurred on 1555 Jun 05, lasting 103 minutes, 6 seconds.	Penumbral	Partial	Total	Central
The greatest eclipse of the series occurred on 1555 Jun 05, lasting 103 minutes, 6 seconds.	888 Apr 29	1014 Jul 14	1429 Mar 20	1483 Apr 22
The greatest eclipse of the series occurred on 1555 Jun 05, lasting 103 minutes, 6 seconds.	Last			
The greatest eclipse of the series occurred on 1555 Jun 05, lasting 103 minutes, 6 seconds.	Central	Total	Partial	Penumbral
The greatest eclipse of the series occurred on 1555 Jun 05, lasting 103 minutes, 6 seconds.	1609 Jul 16	1645 Aug 07	1970 Feb 21	2150 Jun 10

Eclipses are tabulated in three columns; every third eclipse in the same column is one exeligmos apart, so they all cast shadows over approximately the same parts of the Earth.

Series members 52–71 occur between 1801 and 2150:
52	53	54
1807 Nov 15	1825 Nov 25	1843 Dec 07
55	56	57
1861 Dec 17	1879 Dec 28	1898 Jan 08
58	59	60
1916 Jan 20	1934 Jan 30	1952 Feb 11
61	62	63
1970 Feb 21	1988 Mar 03	2006 Mar 14
64	65	66
2024 Mar 25	2042 Apr 05	2060 Apr 15
67	68	69
2078 Apr 27	2096 May 07	2114 May 19
70	71	
2132 May 30	2150 Jun 10	

=== Tritos series ===
This eclipse is a part of a tritos cycle, repeating at alternating nodes every 135 synodic months (≈ 3986.63 days, or 11 years minus 1 month). Their appearance and longitude are irregular due to a lack of synchronization with the anomalistic month (period of perigee), but groupings of 3 tritos cycles (≈ 33 years minus 3 months) come close (≈ 434.044 anomalistic months), so eclipses are similar in these groupings.

Series members between 1801 and 2200
1810 Mar 21 (Saros 100)	1821 Feb 17 (Saros 101)	1832 Jan 17 (Saros 102)	1842 Dec 17 (Saros 103)	
1864 Oct 15 (Saros 105)	1875 Sep 15 (Saros 106)	1886 Aug 14 (Saros 107)	1897 Jul 14 (Saros 108)	1908 Jun 14 (Saros 109)
1919 May 15 (Saros 110)	1930 Apr 13 (Saros 111)	1941 Mar 13 (Saros 112)	1952 Feb 11 (Saros 113)	1963 Jan 09 (Saros 114)
1973 Dec 10 (Saros 115)	1984 Nov 08 (Saros 116)	1995 Oct 08 (Saros 117)	2006 Sep 07 (Saros 118)	2017 Aug 07 (Saros 119)
2028 Jul 06 (Saros 120)	2039 Jun 06 (Saros 121)	2050 May 06 (Saros 122)	2061 Apr 04 (Saros 123)	2072 Mar 04 (Saros 124)
2083 Feb 02 (Saros 125)	2094 Jan 01 (Saros 126)	2104 Dec 02 (Saros 127)	2115 Nov 02 (Saros 128)	2126 Oct 01 (Saros 129)
2137 Aug 30 (Saros 130)	2148 Jul 31 (Saros 131)	2159 Jun 30 (Saros 132)	2170 May 30 (Saros 133)	2181 Apr 29 (Saros 134)
2192 Mar 28 (Saros 135)

=== Inex series ===
This eclipse is a part of the long period inex cycle, repeating at alternating nodes, every 358 synodic months (≈ 10,571.95 days, or 29 years minus 20 days). Their appearance and longitude are irregular due to a lack of synchronization with the anomalistic month (period of perigee). However, groupings of 3 inex cycles (≈ 87 years minus 2 months) comes close (≈ 1,151.02 anomalistic months), so eclipses are similar in these groupings.

Series members between 1801 and 2200
1807 May 21 (Saros 108)	1836 May 01 (Saros 109)	1865 Apr 11 (Saros 110)
1894 Mar 21 (Saros 111)	1923 Mar 03 (Saros 112)	1952 Feb 11 (Saros 113)
1981 Jan 20 (Saros 114)	2009 Dec 31 (Saros 115)	2038 Dec 11 (Saros 116)
2067 Nov 21 (Saros 117)	2096 Oct 31 (Saros 118)	2125 Oct 12 (Saros 119)
2154 Sep 21 (Saros 120)	2183 Sep 02 (Saros 121)	

=== Half-Saros cycle ===
A lunar eclipse will be preceded and followed by solar eclipses by 9 years and 5.5 days (a half saros). This lunar eclipse is related to two total solar eclipses of Solar Saros 120.

February 4, 1943	February 15, 1961

== See also ==
- List of lunar eclipses
- List of 20th-century lunar eclipses
