= February 1970 lunar eclipse =

Partial lunar eclipse February 21, 1970

- Partial eclipse
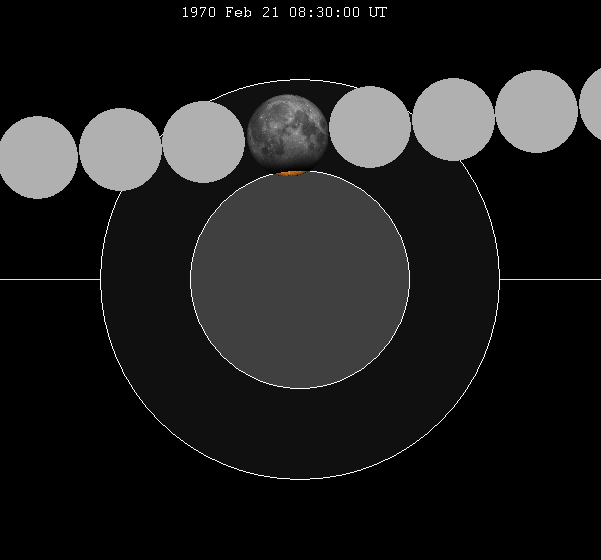
- The Moon's hourly motion shown right to left
- Date: February 21, 1970
- Gamma: 0.9620
- Magnitude: 0.0464
- Saros cycle: 113 (61 of 71)
- Partiality: 52 minutes, 40 seconds
- Penumbral: 298 minutes, 32 seconds
Contacts (UTC)
- P1: 6:00:46
- U1: 8:03:45
- Greatest: 8:30:03
- U4: 8:56:26
- P4: 10:59:18

A partial lunar eclipse occurred at the Moon’s descending node of orbit on Saturday, February 21, 1970, with an umbral magnitude of 0.0464. A lunar eclipse occurs when the Moon moves into the Earth's shadow, causing the Moon to be darkened. A partial lunar eclipse occurs when one part of the Moon is in the Earth's umbra, while the other part is in the Earth's penumbra. Unlike a solar eclipse, which can only be viewed from a relatively small area of the world, a lunar eclipse may be viewed from anywhere on the night side of Earth. Occurring about 2.4 days after apogee (on February 18, 1970, at 23:05 UTC), the Moon's apparent diameter was smaller.

== Visibility ==
The eclipse was completely visible over northeast Asia, North America, and northwestern South America, seen rising over east Asia and Australia and setting over much of South America, western Europe, and west Africa.

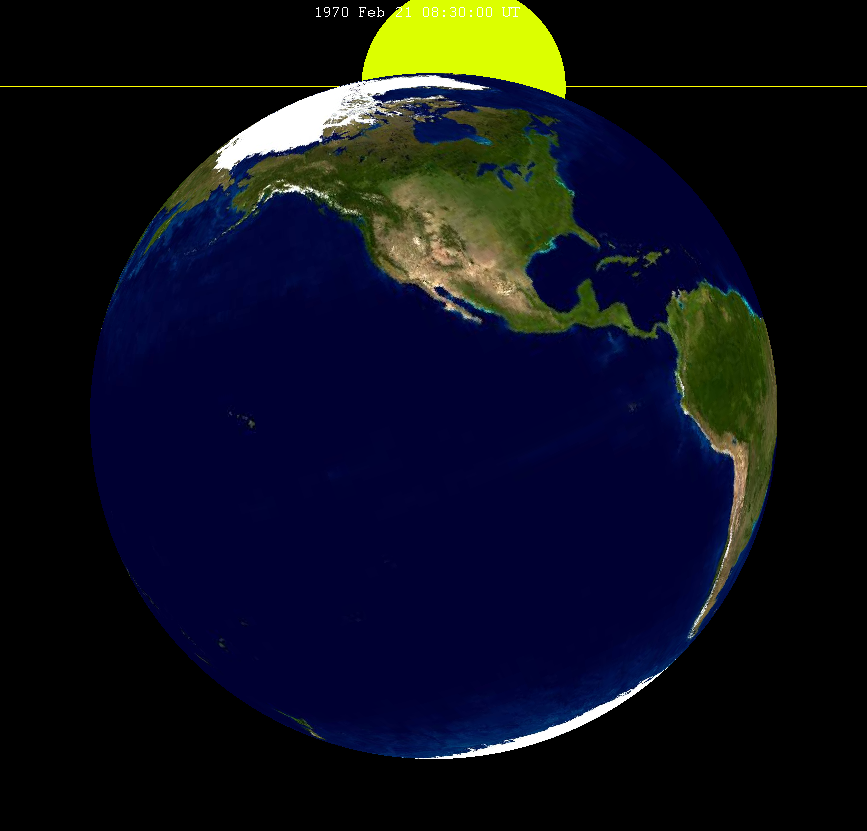
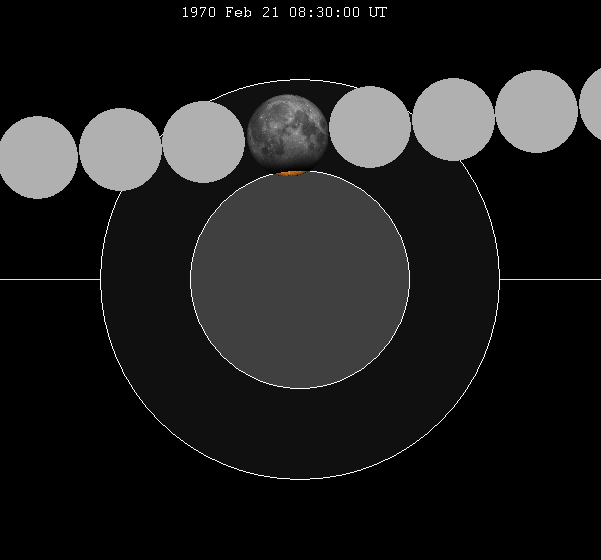

== Eclipse details ==
Shown below is a table displaying details about this particular lunar eclipse. It describes various parameters pertaining to this eclipse.

February 21, 1970 Lunar Eclipse Parameters
Parameter	Value
Penumbral Magnitude	1.14027
Umbral Magnitude	0.04639
Gamma	0.96198
Sun Right Ascension	22h17m07.7s
Sun Declination	-10°39'28.9"
Sun Semi-Diameter	16'10.2"
Sun Equatorial Horizontal Parallax	08.9"
Moon Right Ascension	10h18m43.4s
Moon Declination	+11°26'05.5"
Moon Semi-Diameter	14'47.0"
Moon Equatorial Horizontal Parallax	0°54'15.2"
ΔT	40.3 s

== Eclipse season ==
This eclipse is part of an eclipse season, a period, roughly every six months, when eclipses occur. Only two (or occasionally three) eclipse seasons occur each year, and each season lasts about 35 days and repeats just short of six months (173 days) later; thus two full eclipse seasons always occur each year. Either two or three eclipses happen each eclipse season. In the sequence below, each eclipse is separated by a fortnight.

Eclipse season of February–March 1970
February 21 Descending node (full moon)	March 7 Ascending node (new moon)
Partial lunar eclipse Lunar Saros 113	Total solar eclipse Solar Saros 139

== Related eclipses ==
=== Eclipses in 1970 ===
- A partial lunar eclipse on February 21.
- A total solar eclipse on March 7.
- A partial lunar eclipse on August 17.
- An annular solar eclipse on August 31.

=== Metonic ===
- Preceded by: Lunar eclipse of May 4, 1966
- Followed by: Lunar eclipse of December 10, 1973

=== Tzolkinex ===
- Preceded by: Lunar eclipse of January 9, 1963
- Followed by: Lunar eclipse of April 4, 1977

=== Half-Saros ===
- Preceded by: Solar eclipse of February 15, 1961
- Followed by: Solar eclipse of February 26, 1979

=== Tritos ===
- Preceded by: Lunar eclipse of March 24, 1959
- Followed by: Lunar eclipse of January 20, 1981

=== Lunar Saros 113 ===
- Preceded by: Lunar eclipse of February 11, 1952
- Followed by: Lunar eclipse of March 3, 1988

=== Inex ===
- Preceded by: Lunar eclipse of March 13, 1941
- Followed by: Lunar eclipse of January 31, 1999

=== Triad ===
- Preceded by: Lunar eclipse of April 22, 1883
- Followed by: Lunar eclipse of December 22, 2056

=== Lunar eclipses of 1969–1973 ===
This eclipse is a member of a semester series. An eclipse in a semester series of lunar eclipses repeats approximately every 177 days and 4 hours (a semester) at alternating nodes of the Moon's orbit.

The penumbral lunar eclipses on April 2, 1969 and September 25, 1969 occur in the previous lunar year eclipse set, and the lunar eclipses on June 15, 1973 (penumbral) and December 10, 1973 (partial) occur in the next lunar year eclipse set.

Lunar eclipse series sets from 1969 to 1973
Ascending node				Descending node			
Saros	Date Viewing	Type Chart	Gamma	Saros	Date Viewing	Type Chart	Gamma
108	1969 Aug 27	Penumbral	−1.5407	113	1970 Feb 21	Partial	0.9620
118	1970 Aug 17	Partial	−0.8053	123	1971 Feb 10	Total	0.2741
128	1971 Aug 06	Total	−0.0794	133	1972 Jan 30	Total	−0.4273
138	1972 Jul 26	Partial	0.7117	143	1973 Jan 18	Penumbral	−1.0845
148	1973 Jul 15	Penumbral	1.5178				

=== Metonic series ===
The Metonic cycle repeats nearly exactly every 19 years and represents a Saros cycle plus one lunar year. Because it occurs on the same calendar date, the Earth's shadow will in nearly the same location relative to the background stars.

Metonic lunar eclipse sets 1951–2027
Descending node			Ascending node		
Saros	Date	Type	Saros	Date	Type
103	1951 Feb 21.88	Penumbral	108	1951 Aug 17.13	Penumbral
113	1970 Feb 21.35	Partial	118	1970 Aug 17.14	Partial
123	1989 Feb 20.64	Total	128	1989 Aug 17.13	Total
133	2008 Feb 21.14	Total	138	2008 Aug 16.88	Partial
143	2027 Feb 20.96	Penumbral	148	2027 Aug 17.30	Penumbral

=== Saros 113 ===
This eclipse is a part of Saros series 113, repeating every 18 years, 11 days, and containing 71 events. The series started with a penumbral lunar eclipse on April 29, 888 AD. It contains partial eclipses from July 14, 1014 through March 10, 1411; total eclipses from March 20, 1429 through August 7, 1645; and a second set of partial eclipses from August 18, 1663 through February 21, 1970. The series ends at member 71 as a penumbral eclipse on June 10, 2150.

The longest duration of totality was produced by member 38 at 103 minutes, 6 seconds on June 5, 1555. All eclipses in this series occur at the Moon’s descending node of orbit.

Greatest	First			
The greatest eclipse of the series occurred on 1555 Jun 05, lasting 103 minutes, 6 seconds.	Penumbral	Partial	Total	Central
The greatest eclipse of the series occurred on 1555 Jun 05, lasting 103 minutes, 6 seconds.	888 Apr 29	1014 Jul 14	1429 Mar 20	1483 Apr 22
The greatest eclipse of the series occurred on 1555 Jun 05, lasting 103 minutes, 6 seconds.	Last			
The greatest eclipse of the series occurred on 1555 Jun 05, lasting 103 minutes, 6 seconds.	Central	Total	Partial	Penumbral
The greatest eclipse of the series occurred on 1555 Jun 05, lasting 103 minutes, 6 seconds.	1609 Jul 16	1645 Aug 07	1970 Feb 21	2150 Jun 10

Eclipses are tabulated in three columns; every third eclipse in the same column is one exeligmos apart, so they all cast shadows over approximately the same parts of the Earth.

Series members 52–71 occur between 1801 and 2150:
52	53	54
1807 Nov 15	1825 Nov 25	1843 Dec 07
55	56	57
1861 Dec 17	1879 Dec 28	1898 Jan 08
58	59	60
1916 Jan 20	1934 Jan 30	1952 Feb 11
61	62	63
1970 Feb 21	1988 Mar 03	2006 Mar 14
64	65	66
2024 Mar 25	2042 Apr 05	2060 Apr 15
67	68	69
2078 Apr 27	2096 May 07	2114 May 19
70	71	
2132 May 30	2150 Jun 10	

=== Tritos series ===
This eclipse is a part of a tritos cycle, repeating at alternating nodes every 135 synodic months (≈ 3986.63 days, or 11 years minus 1 month). Their appearance and longitude are irregular due to a lack of synchronization with the anomalistic month (period of perigee), but groupings of 3 tritos cycles (≈ 33 years minus 3 months) come close (≈ 434.044 anomalistic months), so eclipses are similar in these groupings.

Series members between 1817 and 2200
1817 May 01 (Saros 99)	1828 Mar 31 (Saros 100)	1839 Feb 28 (Saros 101)	1850 Jan 28 (Saros 102)	1860 Dec 28 (Saros 103)
		1893 Sep 25 (Saros 106)		1915 Jul 26 (Saros 108)
1926 Jun 25 (Saros 109)	1937 May 25 (Saros 110)	1948 Apr 23 (Saros 111)	1959 Mar 24 (Saros 112)	1970 Feb 21 (Saros 113)
1981 Jan 20 (Saros 114)	1991 Dec 21 (Saros 115)	2002 Nov 20 (Saros 116)	2013 Oct 18 (Saros 117)	2024 Sep 18 (Saros 118)
2035 Aug 19 (Saros 119)	2046 Jul 18 (Saros 120)	2057 Jun 17 (Saros 121)	2068 May 17 (Saros 122)	2079 Apr 16 (Saros 123)
2090 Mar 15 (Saros 124)	2101 Feb 14 (Saros 125)	2112 Jan 14 (Saros 126)	2122 Dec 13 (Saros 127)	2133 Nov 12 (Saros 128)
2144 Oct 11 (Saros 129)	2155 Sep 11 (Saros 130)	2166 Aug 11 (Saros 131)	2177 Jul 11 (Saros 132)	2188 Jun 09 (Saros 133)
2199 May 10 (Saros 134)

=== Inex series ===
This eclipse is a part of the long period inex cycle, repeating at alternating nodes, every 358 synodic months (≈ 10,571.95 days, or 29 years minus 20 days). Their appearance and longitude are irregular due to a lack of synchronization with the anomalistic month (period of perigee). However, groupings of 3 inex cycles (≈ 87 years minus 2 months) comes close (≈ 1,151.02 anomalistic months), so eclipses are similar in these groupings.

Series members between 1801 and 2200
1825 Jun 01 (Saros 108)	1854 May 12 (Saros 109)	1883 Apr 22 (Saros 110)
1912 Apr 01 (Saros 111)	1941 Mar 13 (Saros 112)	1970 Feb 21 (Saros 113)
1999 Jan 31 (Saros 114)	2028 Jan 12 (Saros 115)	2056 Dec 22 (Saros 116)
2085 Dec 01 (Saros 117)	2114 Nov 12 (Saros 118)	2143 Oct 23 (Saros 119)
2172 Oct 02 (Saros 120)

=== Half-Saros cycle ===
A lunar eclipse will be preceded and followed by solar eclipses by 9 years and 5.5 days (a half saros). This lunar eclipse is related to two total solar eclipses of Solar Saros 120.

February 15, 1961	February 26, 1979

== See also ==
- List of lunar eclipses
- List of 20th-century lunar eclipses
