= June 1955 lunar eclipse =

Penumbral lunar eclipse June 5, 1955

- Penumbral eclipse
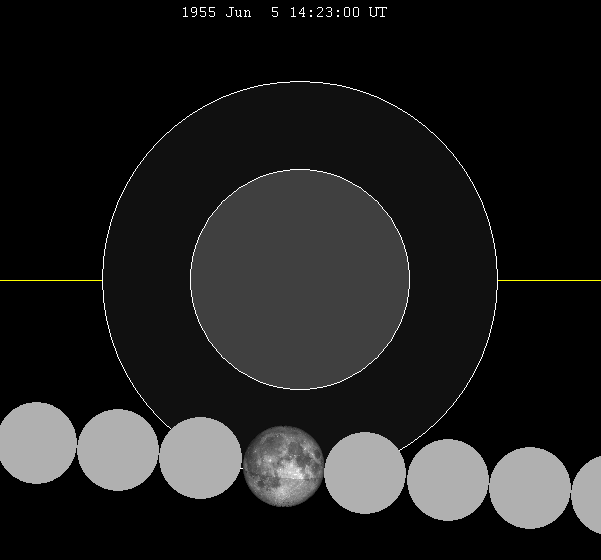
- The Moon's hourly motion shown right to left
- Date: June 5, 1955
- Gamma: −1.2384
- Magnitude: −0.4498
- Saros cycle: 110 (68 of 72)
- Penumbral: 232 minutes, 18 seconds
Contacts (UTC)
- P1: 12:26:43
- Greatest: 14:22:52
- P4: 16:19:01

A penumbral lunar eclipse occurred at the Moon’s ascending node of orbit on Sunday, June 5, 1955, with an umbral magnitude of −0.4498. A lunar eclipse occurs when the Moon moves into the Earth's shadow, causing the Moon to be darkened. A penumbral lunar eclipse occurs when part or all of the Moon's near side passes into the Earth's penumbra. Unlike a solar eclipse, which can only be viewed from a relatively small area of the world, a lunar eclipse may be viewed from anywhere on the night side of Earth. Occurring only about 11 hours after apogee (on June 5, 1955, at 3:45 UTC), the Moon's apparent diameter was smaller.

== Visibility ==
The eclipse was completely visible over east, Australia, and Antarctica, seen rising over the western half of Asia and east Africa and setting over the eastern Pacific Ocean.

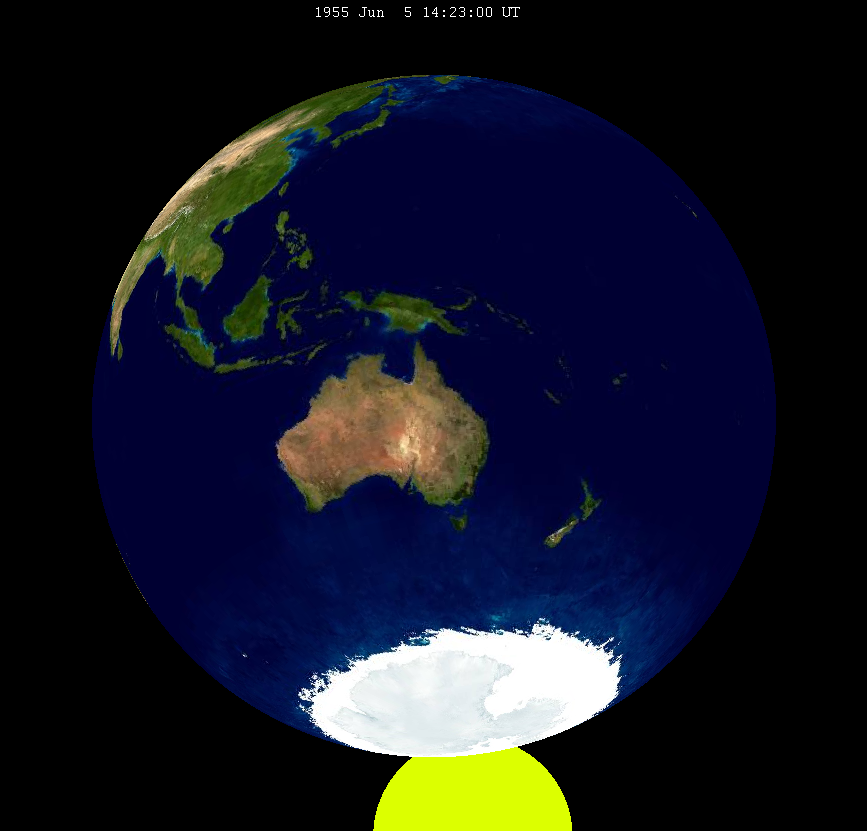
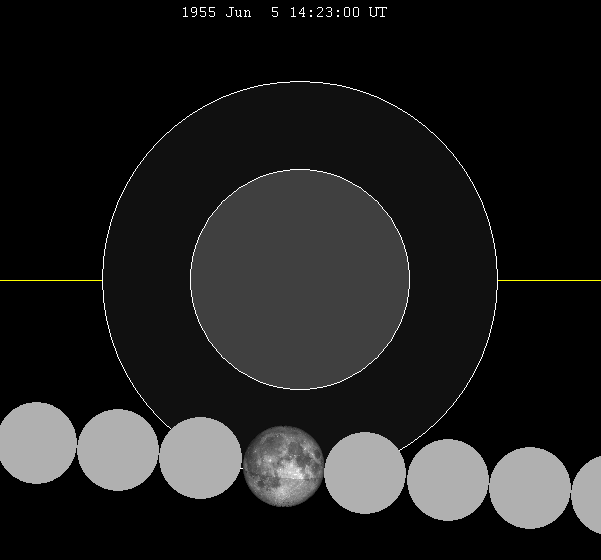

== Eclipse details ==
Shown below is a table displaying details about this particular solar eclipse. It describes various parameters pertaining to this eclipse.

June 5, 1955 Lunar Eclipse Parameters
Parameter	Value
Penumbral Magnitude	0.62181
Umbral Magnitude	−0.44978
Gamma	−1.23842
Sun Right Ascension	04h51m12.9s
Sun Declination	+22°30'11.9"
Sun Semi-Diameter	15'45.8"
Sun Equatorial Horizontal Parallax	08.7"
Moon Right Ascension	16h51m07.1s
Moon Declination	-23°37'02.2"
Moon Semi-Diameter	14'42.6"
Moon Equatorial Horizontal Parallax	0°53'59.1"
ΔT	31.2 s

== Eclipse season ==
This eclipse is part of an eclipse season, a period, roughly every six months, when eclipses occur. Only two (or occasionally three) eclipse seasons occur each year, and each season lasts about 35 days and repeats just short of six months (173 days) later; thus two full eclipse seasons always occur each year. Either two or three eclipses happen each eclipse season. In the sequence below, each eclipse is separated by a fortnight.

Eclipse season of June 1955
June 5 Ascending node (full moon)	June 20 Descending node (new moon)
Penumbral lunar eclipse Lunar Saros 110	Total solar eclipse Solar Saros 136

== Related eclipses ==
=== Eclipses in 1955 ===
- A penumbral lunar eclipse on January 8.
- A penumbral lunar eclipse on June 5.
- A total solar eclipse on June 20.
- A partial lunar eclipse on November 29.
- An annular solar eclipse on December 14.

=== Metonic ===
- Preceded by: Lunar eclipse of August 17, 1951
- Followed by: Lunar eclipse of March 24, 1959

=== Tzolkinex ===
- Preceded by: Lunar eclipse of April 23, 1948
- Followed by: Lunar eclipse of July 17, 1962

=== Half-Saros ===
- Preceded by: Solar eclipse of May 30, 1946
- Followed by: Solar eclipse of June 10, 1964

=== Tritos ===
- Preceded by: Lunar eclipse of July 6, 1944
- Followed by: Lunar eclipse of May 4, 1966

=== Lunar Saros 110 ===
- Preceded by: Lunar eclipse of May 25, 1937
- Followed by: Lunar eclipse of June 15, 1973

=== Inex ===
- Preceded by: Lunar eclipse of June 25, 1926
- Followed by: Lunar eclipse of May 15, 1984

=== Triad ===
- Preceded by: Lunar eclipse of August 3, 1868
- Followed by: Lunar eclipse of April 5, 2042

=== Lunar eclipses of 1955–1958 ===
This eclipse is a member of a semester series. An eclipse in a semester series of lunar eclipses repeats approximately every 177 days and 4 hours (a semester) at alternating nodes of the Moon's orbit.

The penumbral lunar eclipse on January 8, 1955 occurs in the previous lunar year eclipse set, and the penumbral lunar eclipse on April 4, 1958 occurs in the next lunar year eclipse set.

Lunar eclipse series sets from 1955 to 1958
Ascending node				Descending node			
Saros	Date Viewing	Type Chart	Gamma	Saros	Date Viewing	Type Chart	Gamma
110	1955 Jun 05	Penumbral	−1.2384	115	1955 Nov 29	Partial	0.9551
120	1956 May 24	Partial	−0.4726	125	1956 Nov 18	Total	0.2917
130	1957 May 13	Total	0.3046	135	1957 Nov 07	Total	−0.4332
140	1958 May 03	Partial	1.0188	145	1958 Oct 27	Penumbral	−1.1571

=== Saros 110 ===
This eclipse is a part of Saros series 110, repeating every 18 years, 11 days, and containing 72 events. The series started with a penumbral lunar eclipse on May 28, 747 AD. It contains partial eclipses from August 23, 891 AD through April 18, 1288; total eclipses from April 29, 1306 through September 5, 1522; and a second set of partial eclipses from September 16, 1540 through April 22, 1883. The series ends at member 72 as a penumbral eclipse on July 18, 2027.

The longest duration of totality was produced by member 38 at 103 minutes, 8 seconds on July 3, 1414. All eclipses in this series occur at the Moon’s ascending node of orbit.

Greatest	First			
The greatest eclipse of the series occurred on 1414 Jul 03, lasting 103 minutes, 8 seconds.	Penumbral	Partial	Total	Central
The greatest eclipse of the series occurred on 1414 Jul 03, lasting 103 minutes, 8 seconds.	747 May 28	891 Aug 23	1306 Apr 29	1360 May 31
The greatest eclipse of the series occurred on 1414 Jul 03, lasting 103 minutes, 8 seconds.	Last			
The greatest eclipse of the series occurred on 1414 Jul 03, lasting 103 minutes, 8 seconds.	Central	Total	Partial	Penumbral
The greatest eclipse of the series occurred on 1414 Jul 03, lasting 103 minutes, 8 seconds.	1468 Aug 04	1522 Sep 05	1883 Apr 22	2027 Jul 18

Eclipses are tabulated in three columns; every third eclipse in the same column is one exeligmos apart, so they all cast shadows over approximately the same parts of the Earth.

Series members 60–72 occur between 1801 and 2027:
60	61	62
1811 Mar 10	1829 Mar 20	1847 Mar 31
63	64	65
1865 Apr 11	1883 Apr 22	1901 May 03
66	67	68
1919 May 15	1937 May 25	1955 Jun 05
69	70	71
1973 Jun 15	1991 Jun 27	2009 Jul 07
72
2027 Jul 18

=== Tritos series ===
This eclipse is a part of a tritos cycle, repeating at alternating nodes every 135 synodic months (≈ 3986.63 days, or 11 years minus 1 month). Their appearance and longitude are irregular due to a lack of synchronization with the anomalistic month (period of perigee), but groupings of 3 tritos cycles (≈ 33 years minus 3 months) come close (≈ 434.044 anomalistic months), so eclipses are similar in these groupings.

Series members between 1835 and 2200
1835 May 12 (Saros 99)	1846 Apr 11 (Saros 100)		1868 Feb 08 (Saros 102)	1879 Jan 08 (Saros 103)
				1933 Aug 05 (Saros 108)
1944 Jul 06 (Saros 109)	1955 Jun 05 (Saros 110)	1966 May 04 (Saros 111)	1977 Apr 04 (Saros 112)	1988 Mar 03 (Saros 113)
1999 Jan 31 (Saros 114)	2009 Dec 31 (Saros 115)	2020 Nov 30 (Saros 116)	2031 Oct 30 (Saros 117)	2042 Sep 29 (Saros 118)
2053 Aug 29 (Saros 119)	2064 Jul 28 (Saros 120)	2075 Jun 28 (Saros 121)	2086 May 28 (Saros 122)	2097 Apr 26 (Saros 123)
2108 Mar 27 (Saros 124)	2119 Feb 25 (Saros 125)	2130 Jan 24 (Saros 126)	2140 Dec 23 (Saros 127)	2151 Nov 24 (Saros 128)
2162 Oct 23 (Saros 129)	2173 Sep 21 (Saros 130)	2184 Aug 21 (Saros 131)	2195 Jul 22 (Saros 132)	

=== Inex series ===
This eclipse is a part of the long period inex cycle, repeating at alternating nodes, every 358 synodic months (≈ 10,571.95 days, or 29 years minus 20 days). Their appearance and longitude are irregular due to a lack of synchronization with the anomalistic month (period of perigee). However, groupings of 3 inex cycles (≈ 87 years minus 2 months) comes close (≈ 1,151.02 anomalistic months), so eclipses are similar in these groupings.

Series members between 1801 and 2200
1810 Sep 13 (Saros 105)	1839 Aug 24 (Saros 106)	1868 Aug 03 (Saros 107)
1897 Jul 14 (Saros 108)	1926 Jun 25 (Saros 109)	1955 Jun 05 (Saros 110)
1984 May 15 (Saros 111)	2013 Apr 25 (Saros 112)	2042 Apr 05 (Saros 113)
2071 Mar 16 (Saros 114)	2100 Feb 24 (Saros 115)	2129 Feb 04 (Saros 116)
2158 Jan 14 (Saros 117)	2186 Dec 26 (Saros 118)	

=== Half-Saros cycle ===
A lunar eclipse will be preceded and followed by solar eclipses by 9 years and 5.5 days (a half saros). This lunar eclipse is related to two partial solar eclipses of Solar Saros 117.

May 30, 1946	June 10, 1964

== See also ==
- List of lunar eclipses
- List of 20th-century lunar eclipses
