= July 2027 lunar eclipse =

Astronomical event

- Penumbral eclipse
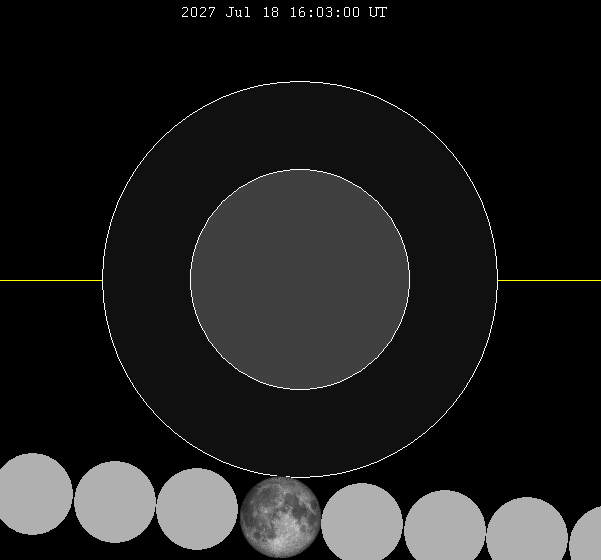
- The Moon's hourly motion shown right to left
- Date: July 18, 2027
- Gamma: −1.5759
- Magnitude: −1.0662
- Saros cycle: 110 (72 of 72)
- Penumbral: 11 minutes, 47 seconds
Contacts (UTC)
- P1: 15:56:57
- Greatest: 16:02:53
- P4: 16:08:45

A penumbral lunar eclipse will occur at the Moon’s ascending node of orbit on Sunday, July 18, 2027, with an umbral magnitude of −1.0662. A lunar eclipse occurs when the Moon moves into the Earth's shadow, causing the Moon to be darkened. A penumbral lunar eclipse occurs when part or all of the Moon's near side passes into the Earth's penumbra. Unlike a solar eclipse, which can only be viewed from a relatively small area of the world, a lunar eclipse may be viewed from anywhere on the night side of Earth. Occurring only about 16 hours before apogee (on July 19, 2027, at 7:50 UTC), the Moon's apparent diameter will be smaller.

The Moon will barely clip the edge of the Earth's penumbral shadow, and the eclipse will be impossible to see in practice. The event is listed as a miss by some sources.

== Visibility ==
The eclipse will be completely visible over Asia, east Africa, and Australia.

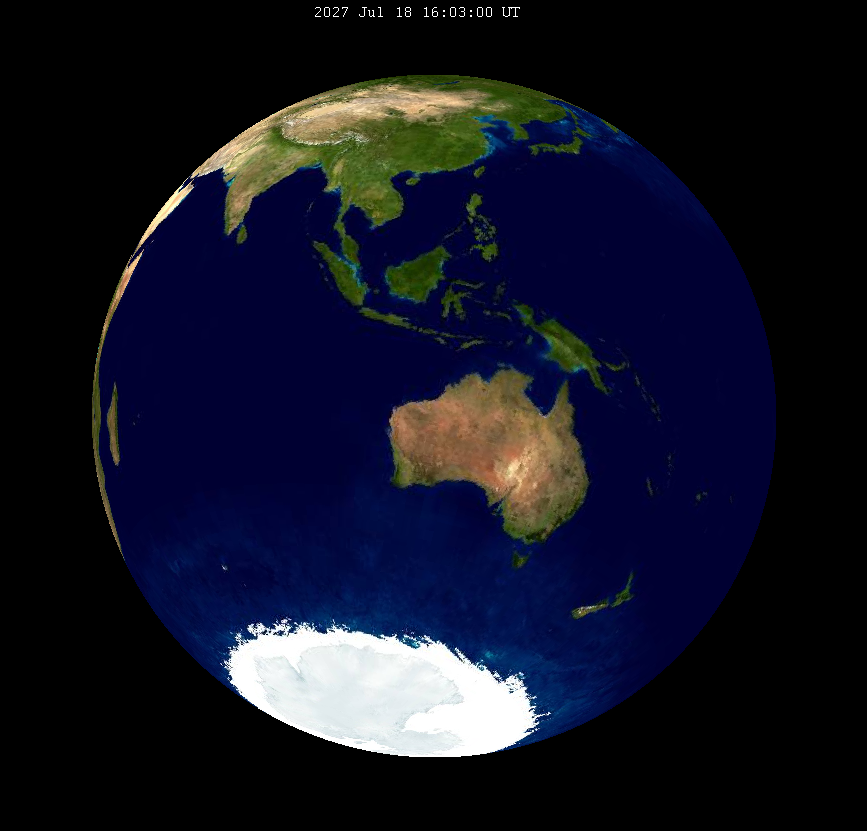
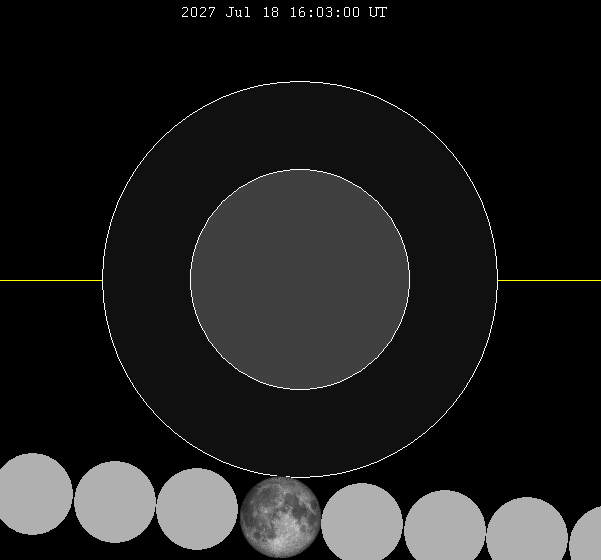

== Eclipse details ==
Shown below is a table displaying details about this particular eclipse. It describes various parameters pertaining to this eclipse.

July 18, 2027 Lunar Eclipse Parameters
Parameter	Value
Penumbral Magnitude	0.00320
Umbral Magnitude	−1.06620
Gamma	−1.57589
Sun Right Ascension	07h51m14.4s
Sun Declination	+20°58'43.6"
Sun Semi-Diameter	15'44.3"
Sun Equatorial Horizontal Parallax	08.7"
Moon Right Ascension	19h52m57.2s
Moon Declination	-22°20'25.3"
Moon Semi-Diameter	14'43.0"
Moon Equatorial Horizontal Parallax	0°54'00.6"
ΔT	72.7 s

== Eclipse season ==
This eclipse is part of an eclipse season, a period, roughly every six months, when eclipses occur. Only two (or occasionally three) eclipse seasons occur each year, and each season lasts about 35 days and repeats just short of six months (173 days) later; thus two full eclipse seasons always occur each year. Either two or three eclipses happen each eclipse season. In the sequence below, each eclipse is separated by a fortnight. The first and last eclipse in this sequence is separated by one synodic month.

Eclipse season of July–August 2027
July 18 Ascending node (full moon)	August 2 Descending node (new moon)	August 17 Ascending node (full moon)
Penumbral lunar eclipse Lunar Saros 110	Total solar eclipse Solar Saros 136	Penumbral lunar eclipse Lunar Saros 148

== Related eclipses ==
=== Eclipses in 2027 ===
- An annular solar eclipse on February 6.
- A penumbral lunar eclipse on February 20.
- A penumbral lunar eclipse on July 18.
- A total solar eclipse on August 2.
- A penumbral lunar eclipse on August 17.

=== Metonic ===
- Followed by: Lunar eclipse of May 7, 2031

=== Tzolkinex ===
- Preceded by: Lunar eclipse of June 5, 2020

=== Half-Saros ===
- Preceded by: Solar eclipse of July 13, 2018
- Followed by: Solar eclipse of July 23, 2036

=== Tritos ===
- Preceded by: Lunar eclipse of August 18, 2016
- Followed by: Lunar eclipse of June 17, 2038

=== Lunar Saros 110 ===
- Preceded by: Lunar eclipse of July 7, 2009

=== Inex ===
- Preceded by: Lunar eclipse of August 8, 1998
- Followed by: Lunar eclipse of June 27, 2056

=== Triad ===
- Followed by: Lunar eclipse of May 19, 2114

=== Lunar eclipses of 2027–2031 ===
This eclipse is a member of a semester series. An eclipse in a semester series of lunar eclipses repeats approximately every 177 days and 4 hours (a semester) at alternating nodes of the Moon's orbit.

The penumbral lunar eclipses on February 20, 2027 and August 17, 2027 occur in the previous lunar year eclipse set, and the penumbral lunar eclipses on May 7, 2031 and October 30, 2031 occur in the next lunar year eclipse set.

Lunar eclipse series sets from 2027 to 2031
Ascending node				Descending node			
Saros	Date Viewing	Type Chart	Gamma	Saros	Date Viewing	Type Chart	Gamma
110	2027 Jul 18	Penumbral	−1.5759	115	2028 Jan 12	Partial	0.9818
120	2028 Jul 06	Partial	−0.7904	125	2028 Dec 31	Total	0.3258
130	2029 Jun 26	Total	0.0124	135	2029 Dec 20	Total	−0.3811
140	2030 Jun 15	Partial	0.7535	145	2030 Dec 09	Penumbral	−1.0732
150	2031 Jun 05	Penumbral	1.4732				

=== Saros 110 ===
This eclipse is a part of Saros series 110, repeating every 18 years, 11 days, and containing 72 events. The series started with a penumbral lunar eclipse on May 28, 747 AD. It contains partial eclipses from August 23, 891 AD through April 18, 1288; total eclipses from April 29, 1306 through September 5, 1522; and a second set of partial eclipses from September 16, 1540 through April 22, 1883. The series ends at member 72 as a penumbral eclipse on July 18, 2027.

The longest duration of totality was produced by member 38 at 103 minutes, 8 seconds on July 3, 1414. All eclipses in this series occur at the Moon’s ascending node of orbit.

Greatest	First			
The greatest eclipse of the series occurred on 1414 Jul 03, lasting 103 minutes, 8 seconds.	Penumbral	Partial	Total	Central
The greatest eclipse of the series occurred on 1414 Jul 03, lasting 103 minutes, 8 seconds.	747 May 28	891 Aug 23	1306 Apr 29	1360 May 31
The greatest eclipse of the series occurred on 1414 Jul 03, lasting 103 minutes, 8 seconds.	Last			
The greatest eclipse of the series occurred on 1414 Jul 03, lasting 103 minutes, 8 seconds.	Central	Total	Partial	Penumbral
The greatest eclipse of the series occurred on 1414 Jul 03, lasting 103 minutes, 8 seconds.	1468 Aug 04	1522 Sep 05	1883 Apr 22	2027 Jul 18

Eclipses are tabulated in three columns; every third eclipse in the same column is one exeligmos apart, so they all cast shadows over approximately the same parts of the Earth.

Series members 60–72 occur between 1801 and 2027:
60	61	62
1811 Mar 10	1829 Mar 20	1847 Mar 31
63	64	65
1865 Apr 11	1883 Apr 22	1901 May 03
66	67	68
1919 May 15	1937 May 25	1955 Jun 05
69	70	71
1973 Jun 15	1991 Jun 27	2009 Jul 07
72
2027 Jul 18

=== Tritos series ===
This eclipse is a part of a tritos cycle, repeating at alternating nodes every 135 synodic months (≈ 3986.63 days, or 11 years minus 1 month). Their appearance and longitude are irregular due to a lack of synchronization with the anomalistic month (period of perigee), but groupings of 3 tritos cycles (≈ 33 years minus 3 months) come close (≈ 434.044 anomalistic months), so eclipses are similar in these groupings.

Series members between 1940 and 2200
1940 Mar 23 (Saros 102)	1951 Feb 21 (Saros 103)			
			2027 Jul 18 (Saros 110)	2038 Jun 17 (Saros 111)
2049 May 17 (Saros 112)	2060 Apr 15 (Saros 113)	2071 Mar 16 (Saros 114)	2082 Feb 13 (Saros 115)	2093 Jan 12 (Saros 116)
2103 Dec 13 (Saros 117)	2114 Nov 12 (Saros 118)	2125 Oct 12 (Saros 119)	2136 Sep 10 (Saros 120)	2147 Aug 11 (Saros 121)
2158 Jul 11 (Saros 122)	2169 Jun 09 (Saros 123)	2180 May 09 (Saros 124)	2191 Apr 09 (Saros 125)	

=== Inex series ===
This eclipse is a part of the long period inex cycle, repeating at alternating nodes, every 358 synodic months (≈ 10,571.95 days, or 29 years minus 20 days). Their appearance and longitude are irregular due to a lack of synchronization with the anomalistic month (period of perigee). However, groupings of 3 inex cycles (≈ 87 years minus 2 months) comes close (≈ 1,151.02 anomalistic months), so eclipses are similar in these groupings.

Series members between 1801 and 2200
1824 Dec 06 (Saros 103)		
		1969 Aug 27 (Saros 108)
1998 Aug 08 (Saros 109)	2027 Jul 18 (Saros 110)	2056 Jun 27 (Saros 111)
2085 Jun 08 (Saros 112)	2114 May 19 (Saros 113)	2143 Apr 29 (Saros 114)
2172 Apr 09 (Saros 115)

=== Half-Saros cycle ===
A lunar eclipse will be preceded and followed by solar eclipses by 9 years and 5.5 days (a half saros). This lunar eclipse is related to two partial solar eclipses of Solar Saros 117.

July 13, 2018	July 23, 2036

== See also ==
- List of lunar eclipses and List of 21st-century lunar eclipses
- August 2016 lunar eclipse
