= December 1992 lunar eclipse =

Total lunar eclipse December 9, 1992

- Total eclipse
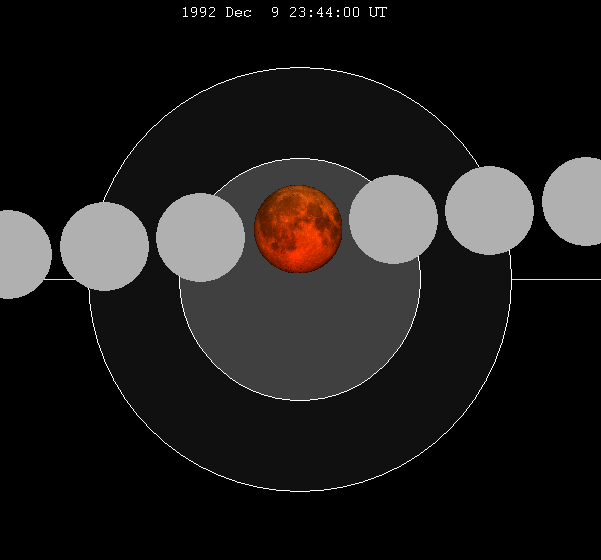
- The Moon's hourly motion shown right to left
- Date: December 9, 1992
- Gamma: 0.3144
- Magnitude: 1.2709
- Saros cycle: 125 (47 of 72)
- Totality: 73 minutes, 53 seconds
- Partiality: 208 minutes, 45 seconds
- Penumbral: 334 minutes, 5 seconds
Contacts (UTC)
- P1: 20:57:01
- U1: 21:59:45
- U2: 23:07:10
- Greatest: 23:44:06
- U3: 0:21:03
- U4: 1:28:29
- P4: 2:31:05

A total lunar eclipse occurred at the Moon’s descending node of orbit on Wednesday, December 9, 1992, with an umbral magnitude of 1.2709. A lunar eclipse occurs when the Moon moves into the Earth's shadow, causing the Moon to be darkened. A total lunar eclipse occurs when the Moon's near side entirely passes into the Earth's umbral shadow. Unlike a solar eclipse, which can only be viewed from a relatively small area of the world, a lunar eclipse may be viewed from anywhere on the night side of Earth. A total lunar eclipse can last up to nearly two hours, while a total solar eclipse lasts only a few minutes at any given place, because the Moon's shadow is smaller. Occurring about 3.9 days before perigee (on December 13, 1992, at 21:05 UTC), the Moon's apparent diameter was larger.

According to Fred Espenak, this was the darkest eclipse in a decade, caused by the June 15, 1991 eruptions of Mount Pinatubo in the Philippines.

== Visibility ==
The eclipse was completely visible over northern North America, Europe, Africa, and west, central, and north Asia, seen rising over much of North America and South America and setting over the eastern half of Asia.

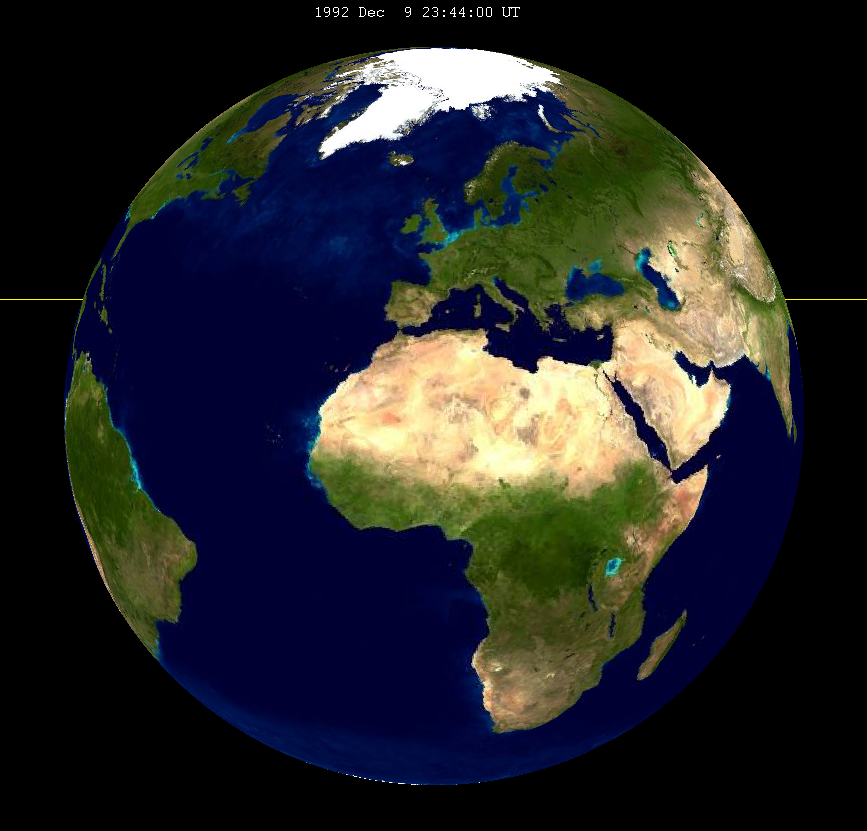
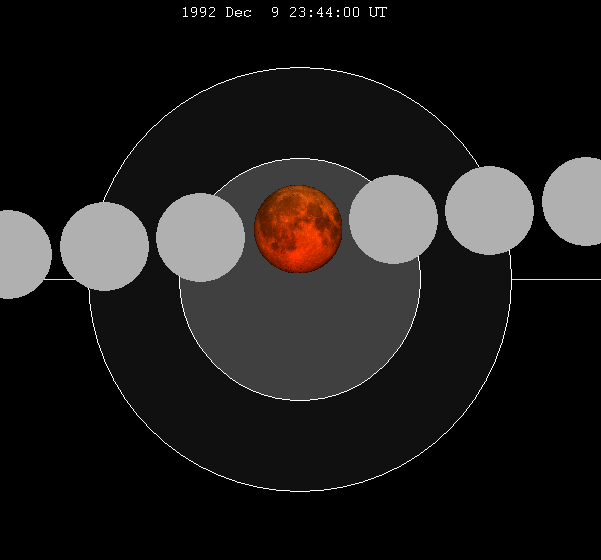

== Eclipse details ==
Shown below is a table displaying details about this particular solar eclipse. It describes various parameters pertaining to this eclipse.

December 9, 1992 Lunar Eclipse Parameters
Parameter	Value
Penumbral Magnitude	2.29154
Umbral Magnitude	1.27090
Gamma	0.31438
Sun Right Ascension	17h08m34.5s
Sun Declination	-22°54'48.3"
Sun Semi-Diameter	16'14.5"
Sun Equatorial Horizontal Parallax	08.9"
Moon Right Ascension	05h08m35.3s
Moon Declination	+23°13'09.8"
Moon Semi-Diameter	15'54.8"
Moon Equatorial Horizontal Parallax	0°58'24.2"
ΔT	59.1 s

== Eclipse season ==
This eclipse is part of an eclipse season, a period, roughly every six months, when eclipses occur. Only two (or occasionally three) eclipse seasons occur each year, and each season lasts about 35 days and repeats just short of six months (173 days) later; thus two full eclipse seasons always occur each year. Either two or three eclipses happen each eclipse season. In the sequence below, each eclipse is separated by a fortnight.

Eclipse season of December 1992
December 9 Descending node (full moon)	December 24 Ascending node (new moon)
Total lunar eclipse Lunar Saros 125	Partial solar eclipse Solar Saros 151

== Related eclipses ==
=== Eclipses in 1992 ===
- An annular solar eclipse on January 4.
- A partial lunar eclipse on June 15.
- A total solar eclipse on June 30.
- A total lunar eclipse on December 9.
- A partial solar eclipse on December 24.

=== Metonic ===
- Preceded by: Lunar eclipse of February 20, 1989
- Followed by: Lunar eclipse of September 27, 1996

=== Tzolkinex ===
- Preceded by: Lunar eclipse of October 28, 1985
- Followed by: Lunar eclipse of January 21, 2000

=== Half-Saros ===
- Preceded by: Solar eclipse of December 4, 1983
- Followed by: Solar eclipse of December 14, 2001

=== Tritos ===
- Preceded by: Lunar eclipse of January 9, 1982
- Followed by: Lunar eclipse of November 9, 2003

=== Lunar Saros 125 ===
- Preceded by: Lunar eclipse of November 29, 1974
- Followed by: Lunar eclipse of December 21, 2010

=== Inex ===
- Preceded by: Lunar eclipse of December 30, 1963
- Followed by: Lunar eclipse of November 19, 2021

=== Triad ===
- Preceded by: Lunar eclipse of February 9, 1906
- Followed by: Lunar eclipse of October 10, 2079

=== Lunar eclipses of 1991–1994 ===
This eclipse is a member of a semester series. An eclipse in a semester series of lunar eclipses repeats approximately every 177 days and 4 hours (a semester) at alternating nodes of the Moon's orbit.

The penumbral lunar eclipses on January 30, 1991 and July 26, 1991 occur in the previous lunar year eclipse set.

Lunar eclipse series sets from 1991 to 1994
Ascending node				Descending node			
Saros	Date Viewing	Type Chart	Gamma	Saros	Date Viewing	Type Chart	Gamma
110	1991 Jun 27	Penumbral	−1.4064	115	1991 Dec 21	Partial	0.9709
120	1992 Jun 15	Partial	−0.6289	125	1992 Dec 09	Total	0.3144
130	1993 Jun 04	Total	0.1638	135	1993 Nov 29	Total	−0.3994
140	1994 May 25	Partial	0.8933	145	1994 Nov 18	Penumbral	−1.1048

=== Saros 125 ===
This eclipse is a part of Saros series 125, repeating every 18 years, 11 days, and containing 72 events. The series started with a penumbral lunar eclipse on July 17, 1163. It contains partial eclipses from January 17, 1470 through June 6, 1686; total eclipses from June 17, 1704 through March 19, 2155; and a second set of partial eclipses from March 29, 2173 through June 25, 2317. The series ends at member 72 as a penumbral eclipse on September 9, 2443.

The longest duration of totality was produced by member 37 at 100 minutes, 23 seconds on August 22, 1812. All eclipses in this series occur at the Moon’s descending node of orbit.

Greatest	First			
The greatest eclipse of the series occurred on 1812 Aug 22, lasting 100 minutes, 23 seconds.	Penumbral	Partial	Total	Central
The greatest eclipse of the series occurred on 1812 Aug 22, lasting 100 minutes, 23 seconds.	1163 Jul 17	1470 Jan 17	1704 Jun 17	1758 Jul 20
The greatest eclipse of the series occurred on 1812 Aug 22, lasting 100 minutes, 23 seconds.	Last			
The greatest eclipse of the series occurred on 1812 Aug 22, lasting 100 minutes, 23 seconds.	Central	Total	Partial	Penumbral
The greatest eclipse of the series occurred on 1812 Aug 22, lasting 100 minutes, 23 seconds.	1920 Oct 27	2155 Mar 19	2317 Jun 25	2443 Sep 09

Eclipses are tabulated in three columns; every third eclipse in the same column is one exeligmos apart, so they all cast shadows over approximately the same parts of the Earth.

Series members 37–58 occur between 1801 and 2200:
37	38	39
1812 Aug 22	1830 Sep 02	1848 Sep 13
40	41	42
1866 Sep 24	1884 Oct 04	1902 Oct 17
43	44	45
1920 Oct 27	1938 Nov 07	1956 Nov 18
46	47	48
1974 Nov 29	1992 Dec 09	2010 Dec 21
49	50	51
2028 Dec 31	2047 Jan 12	2065 Jan 22
52	53	54
2083 Feb 02	2101 Feb 14	2119 Feb 25
55	56	57
2137 Mar 07	2155 Mar 19	2173 Mar 29
58
2191 Apr 09

=== Tritos series ===
This eclipse is a part of a tritos cycle, repeating at alternating nodes every 135 synodic months (≈ 3986.63 days, or 11 years minus 1 month). Their appearance and longitude are irregular due to a lack of synchronization with the anomalistic month (period of perigee), but groupings of 3 tritos cycles (≈ 33 years minus 3 months) come close (≈ 434.044 anomalistic months), so eclipses are similar in these groupings.

Series members between 1801 and 2200
1807 May 21 (Saros 108)	1818 Apr 21 (Saros 109)	1829 Mar 20 (Saros 110)	1840 Feb 17 (Saros 111)	1851 Jan 17 (Saros 112)
1861 Dec 17 (Saros 113)	1872 Nov 15 (Saros 114)	1883 Oct 16 (Saros 115)	1894 Sep 15 (Saros 116)	1905 Aug 15 (Saros 117)
1916 Jul 15 (Saros 118)	1927 Jun 15 (Saros 119)	1938 May 14 (Saros 120)	1949 Apr 13 (Saros 121)	1960 Mar 13 (Saros 122)
1971 Feb 10 (Saros 123)	1982 Jan 09 (Saros 124)	1992 Dec 09 (Saros 125)	2003 Nov 09 (Saros 126)	2014 Oct 08 (Saros 127)
2025 Sep 07 (Saros 128)	2036 Aug 07 (Saros 129)	2047 Jul 07 (Saros 130)	2058 Jun 06 (Saros 131)	2069 May 06 (Saros 132)
2080 Apr 04 (Saros 133)	2091 Mar 05 (Saros 134)	2102 Feb 03 (Saros 135)	2113 Jan 02 (Saros 136)	2123 Dec 03 (Saros 137)
2134 Nov 02 (Saros 138)	2145 Sep 30 (Saros 139)	2156 Aug 30 (Saros 140)	2167 Aug 01 (Saros 141)	2178 Jun 30 (Saros 142)
2189 May 29 (Saros 143)	2200 Apr 30 (Saros 144)			

=== Inex series ===
This eclipse is a part of the long period inex cycle, repeating at alternating nodes, every 358 synodic months (≈ 10,571.95 days, or 29 years minus 20 days). Their appearance and longitude are irregular due to a lack of synchronization with the anomalistic month (period of perigee). However, groupings of 3 inex cycles (≈ 87 years minus 2 months) comes close (≈ 1,151.02 anomalistic months), so eclipses are similar in these groupings.

Series members between 1801 and 2200
1819 Apr 10 (Saros 119)	1848 Mar 19 (Saros 120)	1877 Feb 27 (Saros 121)
1906 Feb 09 (Saros 122)	1935 Jan 19 (Saros 123)	1963 Dec 30 (Saros 124)
1992 Dec 09 (Saros 125)	2021 Nov 19 (Saros 126)	2050 Oct 30 (Saros 127)
2079 Oct 10 (Saros 128)	2108 Sep 20 (Saros 129)	2137 Aug 30 (Saros 130)
2166 Aug 11 (Saros 131)	2195 Jul 22 (Saros 132)	

=== Half-Saros cycle ===
A lunar eclipse will be preceded and followed by solar eclipses by 9 years and 5.5 days (a half saros). This lunar eclipse is related to two annular solar eclipses of Solar Saros 132.

December 4, 1983	December 14, 2001

== See also ==
- List of lunar eclipses
- List of 20th-century lunar eclipses
