= June 1973 lunar eclipse =

Penumbral lunar eclipse

- Penumbral eclipse
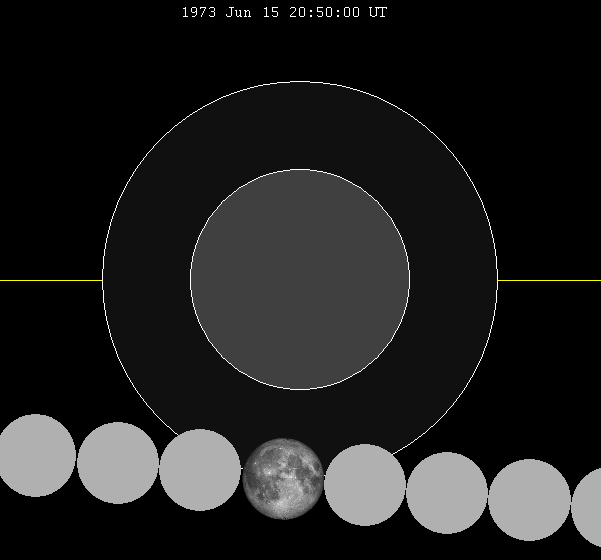
- The Moon's hourly motion shown right to left
- Date: June 15, 1973
- Gamma: −1.3217
- Magnitude: −0.6020
- Saros cycle: 110 (69 of 72)
- Penumbral: 204 minutes, 36 seconds
Contacts (UTC)
- P1: 19:07:39
- Greatest: 20:49:57
- P4: 22:32:15

A penumbral lunar eclipse occurred at the Moon’s ascending node of orbit on Friday, June 15, 1973, with an umbral magnitude of −0.6020. A lunar eclipse occurs when the Moon moves into the Earth's shadow, causing the Moon to be darkened. A penumbral lunar eclipse occurs when part or all of the Moon's near side passes into the Earth's penumbra. Unlike a solar eclipse, which can only be viewed from a relatively small area of the world, a lunar eclipse may be viewed from anywhere on the night side of Earth. Occurring only about 3 hours after apogee (on June 15, 1973, at 18:05 UTC), the Moon's apparent diameter was smaller.

This eclipse was the second of four lunar eclipses in 1973, with the others occurring on January 18 (penumbral), July 15 (penumbral), and December 10 (partial).

== Visibility ==
The eclipse was completely visible over much of Africa, eastern Europe, the western half of Asia, and Antarctica, seen rising over much of South America, western Europe, and west Africa and setting over east Asia and Australia.

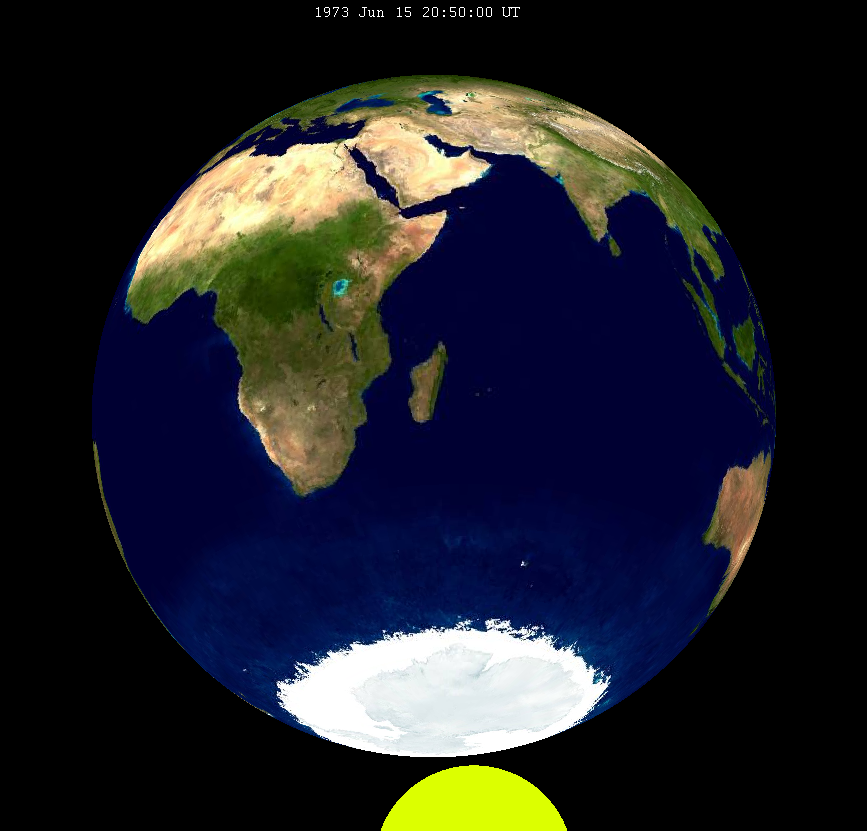
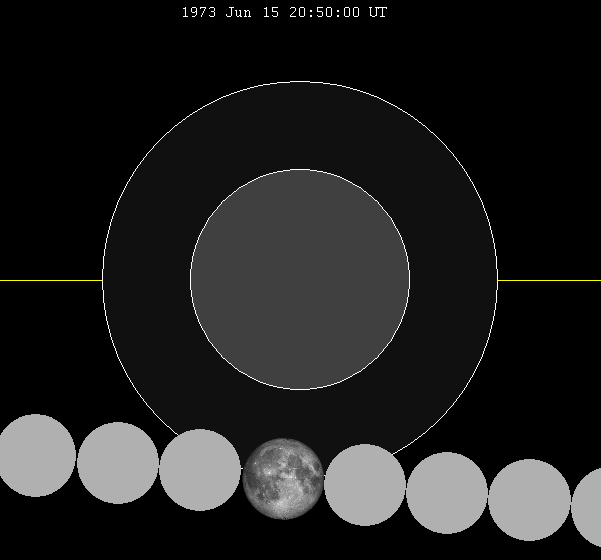

== Eclipse details ==
Shown below is a table displaying details about this particular solar eclipse. It describes various parameters pertaining to this eclipse.

June 15, 1973 Lunar Eclipse Parameters
Parameter	Value
Penumbral Magnitude	0.46852
Umbral Magnitude	−0.60197
Gamma	−1.32166
Sun Right Ascension	05h36m24.5s
Sun Declination	+23°19'56.0"
Sun Semi-Diameter	15'44.6"
Sun Equatorial Horizontal Parallax	08.7"
Moon Right Ascension	17h36m42.3s
Moon Declination	-24°31'09.1"
Moon Semi-Diameter	14'42.4"
Moon Equatorial Horizontal Parallax	0°53'58.5"
ΔT	43.8 s

== Eclipse season ==
This eclipse is part of an eclipse season, a period, roughly every six months, when eclipses occur. Only two (or occasionally three) eclipse seasons occur each year, and each season lasts about 35 days and repeats just short of six months (173 days) later; thus two full eclipse seasons always occur each year. Either two or three eclipses happen each eclipse season. In the sequence below, each eclipse is separated by a fortnight. The first and last eclipse in this sequence is separated by one synodic month.

Eclipse season of June–July 1973
June 15 Ascending node (full moon)	June 30 Descending node (new moon)	July 15 Ascending node (full moon)
Penumbral lunar eclipse Lunar Saros 110	Total solar eclipse Solar Saros 136	Penumbral lunar eclipse Lunar Saros 148

== Related eclipses ==
=== Eclipses in 1973 ===
- An annular solar eclipse on January 4.
- A penumbral lunar eclipse on January 18.
- A penumbral lunar eclipse on June 15.
- A total solar eclipse on June 30.
- A penumbral lunar eclipse on July 15.
- A partial lunar eclipse on December 10.
- An annular solar eclipse on December 24.

=== Metonic ===
- Preceded by: Lunar eclipse of August 27, 1969
- Followed by: Lunar eclipse of April 4, 1977

=== Tzolkinex ===
- Preceded by: Lunar eclipse of May 4, 1966
- Followed by: Lunar eclipse of July 27, 1980

=== Half-Saros ===
- Preceded by: Solar eclipse of June 10, 1964
- Followed by: Solar eclipse of June 21, 1982

=== Tritos ===
- Preceded by: Lunar eclipse of July 17, 1962
- Followed by: Lunar eclipse of May 15, 1984

=== Lunar Saros 110 ===
- Preceded by: Lunar eclipse of June 5, 1955
- Followed by: Lunar eclipse of June 27, 1991

=== Inex ===
- Preceded by: Lunar eclipse of July 6, 1944
- Followed by: Lunar eclipse of May 26, 2002

=== Triad ===
- Preceded by: Lunar eclipse of August 14, 1886
- Followed by: Lunar eclipse of April 15, 2060

=== Lunar eclipses of 1973–1976 ===
This eclipse is a member of a semester series. An eclipse in a semester series of lunar eclipses repeats approximately every 177 days and 4 hours (a semester) at alternating nodes of the Moon's orbit.

The penumbral lunar eclipses on January 18, 1973 and July 15, 1973 occur in the previous lunar year eclipse set.

Lunar eclipse series sets from 1973 to 1976
Ascending node				Descending node			
Saros	Date Viewing	Type Chart	Gamma	Saros	Date Viewing	Type Chart	Gamma
110	1973 Jun 15	Penumbral	−1.3217	115	1973 Dec 10	Partial	0.9644
120	1974 Jun 04	Partial	−0.5489	125	1974 Nov 29	Total	0.3054
130	1975 May 25	Total	0.2367	135	1975 Nov 18	Total	−0.4134
140	1976 May 13	Partial	0.9586	145	1976 Nov 06	Penumbral	−1.1276

=== Saros 110 ===
This eclipse is a part of Saros series 110, repeating every 18 years, 11 days, and containing 72 events. The series started with a penumbral lunar eclipse on May 28, 747 AD. It contains partial eclipses from August 23, 891 AD through April 18, 1288; total eclipses from April 29, 1306 through September 5, 1522; and a second set of partial eclipses from September 16, 1540 through April 22, 1883. The series ends at member 72 as a penumbral eclipse on July 18, 2027.

The longest duration of totality was produced by member 38 at 103 minutes, 8 seconds on July 3, 1414. All eclipses in this series occur at the Moon’s ascending node of orbit.

Greatest	First			
The greatest eclipse of the series occurred on 1414 Jul 03, lasting 103 minutes, 8 seconds.	Penumbral	Partial	Total	Central
The greatest eclipse of the series occurred on 1414 Jul 03, lasting 103 minutes, 8 seconds.	747 May 28	891 Aug 23	1306 Apr 29	1360 May 31
The greatest eclipse of the series occurred on 1414 Jul 03, lasting 103 minutes, 8 seconds.	Last			
The greatest eclipse of the series occurred on 1414 Jul 03, lasting 103 minutes, 8 seconds.	Central	Total	Partial	Penumbral
The greatest eclipse of the series occurred on 1414 Jul 03, lasting 103 minutes, 8 seconds.	1468 Aug 04	1522 Sep 05	1883 Apr 22	2027 Jul 18

Eclipses are tabulated in three columns; every third eclipse in the same column is one exeligmos apart, so they all cast shadows over approximately the same parts of the Earth.

Series members 60–72 occur between 1801 and 2027:
60	61	62
1811 Mar 10	1829 Mar 20	1847 Mar 31
63	64	65
1865 Apr 11	1883 Apr 22	1901 May 03
66	67	68
1919 May 15	1937 May 25	1955 Jun 05
69	70	71
1973 Jun 15	1991 Jun 27	2009 Jul 07
72
2027 Jul 18

=== Tritos series ===
This eclipse is a part of a tritos cycle, repeating at alternating nodes every 135 synodic months (≈ 3986.63 days, or 11 years minus 1 month). Their appearance and longitude are irregular due to a lack of synchronization with the anomalistic month (period of perigee), but groupings of 3 tritos cycles (≈ 33 years minus 3 months) come close (≈ 434.044 anomalistic months), so eclipses are similar in these groupings.

Series members between 1886 and 2200
1886 Feb 18 (Saros 102)	1897 Jan 18 (Saros 103)			
	1951 Aug 17 (Saros 108)	1962 Jul 17 (Saros 109)	1973 Jun 15 (Saros 110)	1984 May 15 (Saros 111)
1995 Apr 15 (Saros 112)	2006 Mar 14 (Saros 113)	2017 Feb 11 (Saros 114)	2028 Jan 12 (Saros 115)	2038 Dec 11 (Saros 116)
2049 Nov 09 (Saros 117)	2060 Oct 09 (Saros 118)	2071 Sep 09 (Saros 119)	2082 Aug 08 (Saros 120)	2093 Jul 08 (Saros 121)
2104 Jun 08 (Saros 122)	2115 May 08 (Saros 123)	2126 Apr 07 (Saros 124)	2137 Mar 07 (Saros 125)	2148 Feb 04 (Saros 126)
2159 Jan 04 (Saros 127)	2169 Dec 04 (Saros 128)	2180 Nov 02 (Saros 129)	2191 Oct 02 (Saros 130)	

=== Inex series ===
This eclipse is a part of the long period inex cycle, repeating at alternating nodes, every 358 synodic months (≈ 10,571.95 days, or 29 years minus 20 days). Their appearance and longitude are irregular due to a lack of synchronization with the anomalistic month (period of perigee). However, groupings of 3 inex cycles (≈ 87 years minus 2 months) comes close (≈ 1,151.02 anomalistic months), so eclipses are similar in these groupings.

Series members between 1801 and 2200
1828 Sep 23 (Saros 105)	1857 Sep 04 (Saros 106)	1886 Aug 14 (Saros 107)
1915 Jul 26 (Saros 108)	1944 Jul 06 (Saros 109)	1973 Jun 15 (Saros 110)
2002 May 26 (Saros 111)	2031 May 07 (Saros 112)	2060 Apr 15 (Saros 113)
2089 Mar 26 (Saros 114)	2118 Mar 07 (Saros 115)	2147 Feb 15 (Saros 116)
2176 Jan 26 (Saros 117)

=== Half-Saros cycle ===
A lunar eclipse will be preceded and followed by solar eclipses by 9 years and 5.5 days (a half saros). This lunar eclipse is related to two partial solar eclipses of Solar Saros 117.

June 10, 1964	June 21, 1982

== See also ==
- List of lunar eclipses
- List of 20th-century lunar eclipses
