= July 2009 lunar eclipse =

Penumbral lunar eclipse 20 July 2009

- Penumbral eclipse
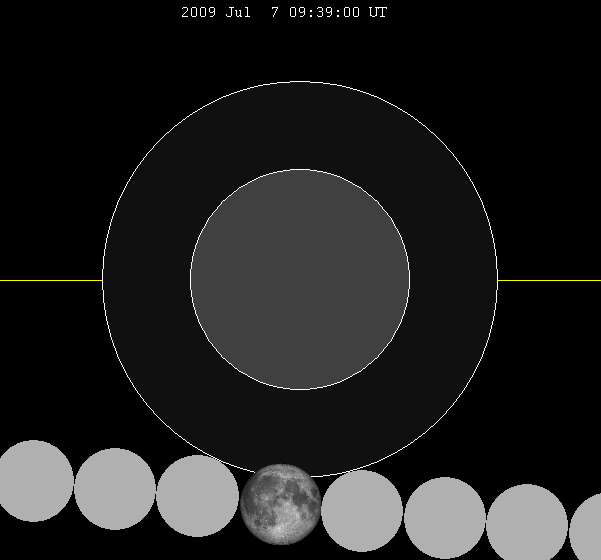
- The Moon grazed the southern penumbral shadow of the Earth.
- Date: July 7, 2009
- Gamma: −1.4915
- Magnitude: −0.9116
- Saros cycle: 110 (71 of 72)
- Penumbral: 121 minutes, 29 seconds
Contacts (UTC)
- P1: 8:37:51
- Greatest: 9:38:36
- P4: 10:39:20

External image
- https://www.flickr.com/photos/sonypic/3700598637

A penumbral lunar eclipse occurred at the Moon’s ascending node of orbit on Tuesday, July 7, 2009, with an umbral magnitude of −0.9116. A lunar eclipse occurs when the Moon moves into the Earth's shadow, causing the Moon to be darkened. A penumbral lunar eclipse occurs when part or all of the Moon's near side passes into the Earth's penumbra. Unlike a solar eclipse, which can only be viewed from a relatively small area of the world, a lunar eclipse may be viewed from anywhere on the night side of Earth. Occurring only about 8 hours before apogee (on July 7, 2009, at 17:40 UTC), the Moon's apparent diameter was smaller. This eclipse entered only the southernmost tip of the penumbral shadow and thus was predicted to be very difficult to observe visually.

This eclipse was the second of four lunar eclipses in 2009, with the others occurring on February 9 (penumbral), August 6 (penumbral), and December 31 (partial).

== Visibility ==
The eclipse was completely visible over eastern Australia and western North and South America, seen rising over western Australia and setting over eastern North and South America.

Hourly motion shown right to left	The Moon's hourly motion across the Earth's shadow in the constellation of Sagittarius.
Visibility map

== Eclipse details ==
Shown below is a table displaying details about this particular solar eclipse. It describes various parameters pertaining to this eclipse.

July 7, 2009 Lunar Eclipse Parameters
Parameter	Value
Penumbral Magnitude	0.15783
Umbral Magnitude	−0.91159
Gamma	−1.49158
Sun Right Ascension	07h06m54.1s
Sun Declination	+22°32'55.2"
Sun Semi-Diameter	15'43.9"
Sun Equatorial Horizontal Parallax	08.7"
Moon Right Ascension	19h08m08.1s
Moon Declination	-23°51'38.0"
Moon Semi-Diameter	14'42.6"
Moon Equatorial Horizontal Parallax	0°53'59.3"
ΔT	65.9 s

== Eclipse season ==
This eclipse is part of an eclipse season, a period, roughly every six months, when eclipses occur. Only two (or occasionally three) eclipse seasons occur each year, and each season lasts about 35 days and repeats just short of six months (173 days) later; thus two full eclipse seasons always occur each year. Either two or three eclipses happen each eclipse season. In the sequence below, each eclipse is separated by a fortnight. The first and last eclipse in this sequence is separated by one synodic month.

Eclipse season of July–August 2009
July 7 Ascending node (full moon)	July 22 Descending node (new moon)	August 6 Ascending node (full moon)
Penumbral lunar eclipse Lunar Saros 110	Total solar eclipse Solar Saros 136	Penumbral lunar eclipse Lunar Saros 148

== Related eclipses ==
=== Eclipses in 2009 ===
- An annular solar eclipse on January 26.
- A penumbral lunar eclipse on February 9.
- A penumbral lunar eclipse on July 7.
- A total solar eclipse on July 22.
- A penumbral lunar eclipse on August 6.
- A partial lunar eclipse on December 31.

=== Metonic ===
- Followed by: Lunar eclipse of April 25, 2013

=== Tzolkinex ===
- Preceded by: Lunar eclipse of May 26, 2002
- Followed by: Lunar eclipse of August 18, 2016

=== Half-Saros ===
- Preceded by: Solar eclipse of July 1, 2000
- Followed by: Solar eclipse of July 13, 2018

=== Tritos ===
- Preceded by: Lunar eclipse of August 8, 1998
- Followed by: Lunar eclipse of June 5, 2020

=== Lunar Saros 110 ===
- Preceded by: Lunar eclipse of June 27, 1991
- Followed by: Lunar eclipse of July 18, 2027

=== Inex ===
- Preceded by: Lunar eclipse of July 27, 1980
- Followed by: Lunar eclipse of June 17, 2038

=== Triad ===
- Followed by: Lunar eclipse of May 7, 2096

=== Lunar eclipses of 2009–2013 ===
This eclipse is a member of a semester series. An eclipse in a semester series of lunar eclipses repeats approximately every 177 days and 4 hours (a semester) at alternating nodes of the Moon's orbit.

The penumbral lunar eclipses on February 9, 2009 and August 6, 2009 occur in the previous lunar year eclipse set, and the lunar eclipses on April 25, 2013 (partial) and October 18, 2013 (penumbral) occur in the next lunar year eclipse set.

Lunar eclipse series sets from 2009 to 2013
Ascending node				Descending node			
Saros	Date Viewing	Type Chart	Gamma	Saros	Date Viewing	Type Chart	Gamma
110	2009 Jul 07	Penumbral	−1.4916	115	2009 Dec 31	Partial	0.9766
120	2010 Jun 26	Partial	−0.7091	125	2010 Dec 21	Total	0.3214
130	2011 Jun 15	Total	0.0897	135	2011 Dec 10	Total	−0.3882
140	2012 Jun 04	Partial	0.8248	145	2012 Nov 28	Penumbral	−1.0869
150	2013 May 25	Penumbral	1.5351				

=== Saros 110 ===
This eclipse is a part of Saros series 110, repeating every 18 years, 11 days, and containing 72 events. The series started with a penumbral lunar eclipse on May 28, 747 AD. It contains partial eclipses from August 23, 891 AD through April 18, 1288; total eclipses from April 29, 1306 through September 5, 1522; and a second set of partial eclipses from September 16, 1540 through April 22, 1883. The series ends at member 72 as a penumbral eclipse on July 18, 2027.

The longest duration of totality was produced by member 38 at 103 minutes, 8 seconds on July 3, 1414. All eclipses in this series occur at the Moon’s ascending node of orbit.

Greatest	First			
The greatest eclipse of the series occurred on 1414 Jul 03, lasting 103 minutes, 8 seconds.	Penumbral	Partial	Total	Central
The greatest eclipse of the series occurred on 1414 Jul 03, lasting 103 minutes, 8 seconds.	747 May 28	891 Aug 23	1306 Apr 29	1360 May 31
The greatest eclipse of the series occurred on 1414 Jul 03, lasting 103 minutes, 8 seconds.	Last			
The greatest eclipse of the series occurred on 1414 Jul 03, lasting 103 minutes, 8 seconds.	Central	Total	Partial	Penumbral
The greatest eclipse of the series occurred on 1414 Jul 03, lasting 103 minutes, 8 seconds.	1468 Aug 04	1522 Sep 05	1883 Apr 22	2027 Jul 18

Eclipses are tabulated in three columns; every third eclipse in the same column is one exeligmos apart, so they all cast shadows over approximately the same parts of the Earth.

Series members 60–72 occur between 1801 and 2027:
60	61	62
1811 Mar 10	1829 Mar 20	1847 Mar 31
63	64	65
1865 Apr 11	1883 Apr 22	1901 May 03
66	67	68
1919 May 15	1937 May 25	1955 Jun 05
69	70	71
1973 Jun 15	1991 Jun 27	2009 Jul 07
72
2027 Jul 18

=== Tritos series ===
This eclipse is a part of a tritos cycle, repeating at alternating nodes every 135 synodic months (≈ 3986.63 days, or 11 years minus 1 month). Their appearance and longitude are irregular due to a lack of synchronization with the anomalistic month (period of perigee), but groupings of 3 tritos cycles (≈ 33 years minus 3 months) come close (≈ 434.044 anomalistic months), so eclipses are similar in these groupings.

Series members between 1922 and 2200
1922 Mar 13 (Saros 102)	1933 Feb 10 (Saros 103)			
		1998 Aug 08 (Saros 109)	2009 Jul 07 (Saros 110)	2020 Jun 05 (Saros 111)
2031 May 07 (Saros 112)	2042 Apr 05 (Saros 113)	2053 Mar 04 (Saros 114)	2064 Feb 02 (Saros 115)	2075 Jan 02 (Saros 116)
2085 Dec 01 (Saros 117)	2096 Oct 31 (Saros 118)	2107 Oct 02 (Saros 119)	2118 Aug 31 (Saros 120)	2129 Jul 31 (Saros 121)
2140 Jun 30 (Saros 122)	2151 May 30 (Saros 123)	2162 Apr 29 (Saros 124)	2173 Mar 29 (Saros 125)	2184 Feb 26 (Saros 126)
2195 Jan 26 (Saros 127)

=== Inex series ===
This eclipse is a part of the long period inex cycle, repeating at alternating nodes, every 358 synodic months (≈ 10,571.95 days, or 29 years minus 20 days). Their appearance and longitude are irregular due to a lack of synchronization with the anomalistic month (period of perigee). However, groupings of 3 inex cycles (≈ 87 years minus 2 months) comes close (≈ 1,151.02 anomalistic months), so eclipses are similar in these groupings.

Series members between 1801 and 2200
1806 Nov 26 (Saros 103)		1864 Oct 15 (Saros 105)
1893 Sep 25 (Saros 106)		1951 Aug 17 (Saros 108)
1980 Jul 27 (Saros 109)	2009 Jul 07 (Saros 110)	2038 Jun 17 (Saros 111)
2067 May 28 (Saros 112)	2096 May 07 (Saros 113)	2125 Apr 18 (Saros 114)
2154 Mar 29 (Saros 115)	2183 Mar 09 (Saros 116)	

=== Half-Saros cycle ===
A lunar eclipse will be preceded and followed by solar eclipses by 9 years and 5.5 days (a half saros). This lunar eclipse is related to two partial solar eclipses of Solar Saros 117.

July 1, 2000	July 13, 2018

== See also ==
- List of lunar eclipses and List of 21st-century lunar eclipses
- File:2009-07-07 Lunar Eclipse Sketch.gif Chart
