= May 1937 lunar eclipse =

Penumbral lunar eclipse May 25, 1937

- Penumbral eclipse
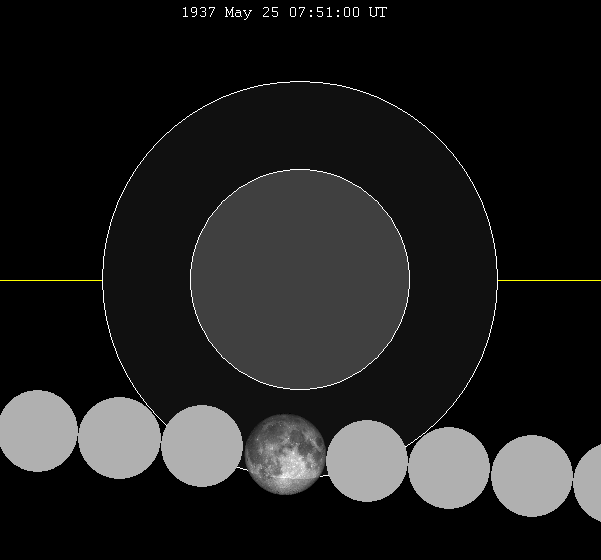
- The Moon's hourly motion shown right to left
- Date: May 25, 1937
- Gamma: −1.1582
- Magnitude: −0.3033
- Saros cycle: 110 (67 of 72)
- Penumbral: 254 minutes, 43 seconds
Contacts (UTC)
- P1: 5:43:50
- Greatest: 7:51:10
- P4: 9:58:33

A penumbral lunar eclipse occurred at the Moon’s ascending node of orbit on Tuesday, May 25, 1937, with an umbral magnitude of −0.3033. A lunar eclipse occurs when the Moon moves into the Earth's shadow, causing the Moon to be darkened. A penumbral lunar eclipse occurs when part or all of the Moon's near side passes into the Earth's penumbra. Unlike a solar eclipse, which can only be viewed from a relatively small area of the world, a lunar eclipse may be viewed from anywhere on the night side of Earth. Occurring only about 18 hours after apogee (on May 24, 1937, at 13:30 UTC), the Moon's apparent diameter was smaller.

== Visibility ==
The eclipse was completely visible over much of North America, western and central South America, and Antarctica, seen rising over Australia and setting over northeastern North America, eastern South America, and west Africa.

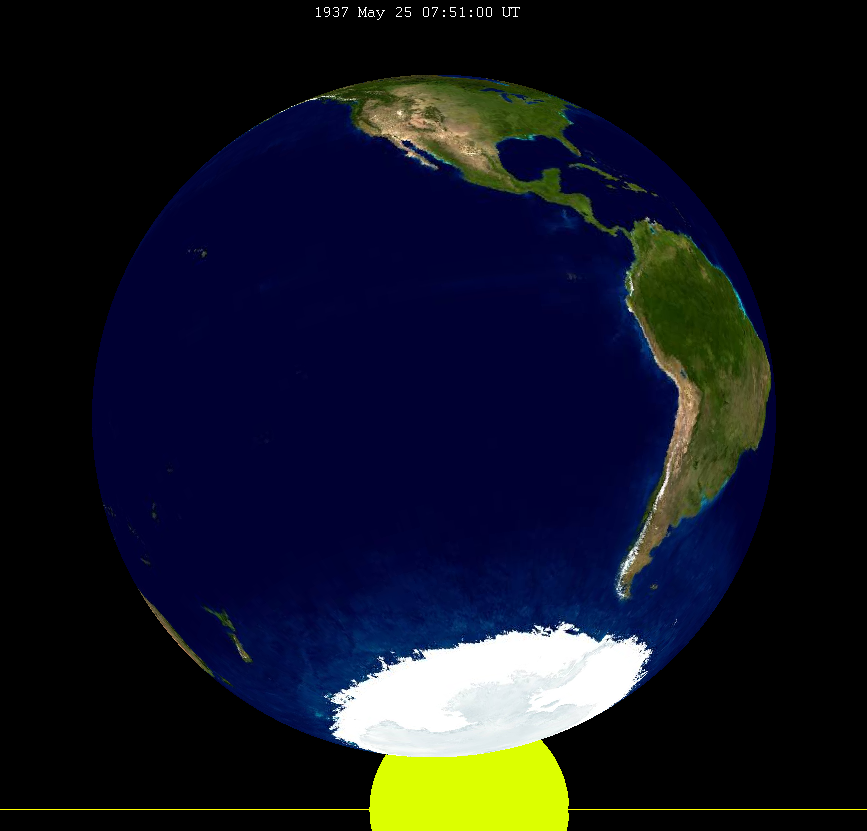
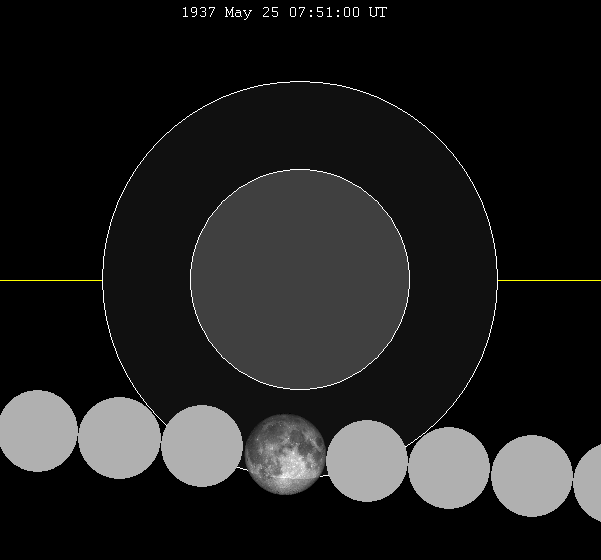

== Eclipse details ==
Shown below is a table displaying details about this particular solar eclipse. It describes various parameters pertaining to this eclipse.

May 25, 1937 Lunar Eclipse Parameters
Parameter	Value
Penumbral Magnitude	0.76969
Umbral Magnitude	−0.30327
Gamma	−1.15820
Sun Right Ascension	04h06m39.7s
Sun Declination	+20°53'38.5"
Sun Semi-Diameter	15'47.3"
Sun Equatorial Horizontal Parallax	08.7"
Moon Right Ascension	16h06m15.0s
Moon Declination	-21°55'55.1"
Moon Semi-Diameter	14'42.9"
Moon Equatorial Horizontal Parallax	0°54'00.1"
ΔT	23.9 s

== Eclipse season ==
This eclipse is part of an eclipse season, a period, roughly every six months, when eclipses occur. Only two (or occasionally three) eclipse seasons occur each year, and each season lasts about 35 days and repeats just short of six months (173 days) later; thus two full eclipse seasons always occur each year. Either two or three eclipses happen each eclipse season. In the sequence below, each eclipse is separated by a fortnight.

Eclipse season of May–June 1937
May 25 Ascending node (full moon)	June 8 Descending node (new moon)
Penumbral lunar eclipse Lunar Saros 110	Total solar eclipse Solar Saros 136

== Related eclipses ==
=== Eclipses in 1937 ===
- A penumbral lunar eclipse on May 25.
- A total solar eclipse on June 8.
- A partial lunar eclipse on November 18.
- An annular solar eclipse on December 2.

=== Metonic ===
- Preceded by: Lunar eclipse of August 5, 1933
- Followed by: Lunar eclipse of March 13, 1941

=== Tzolkinex ===
- Preceded by: Lunar eclipse of April 13, 1930
- Followed by: Lunar eclipse of July 6, 1944

=== Half-Saros ===
- Preceded by: Solar eclipse of May 19, 1928
- Followed by: Solar eclipse of May 30, 1946

=== Tritos ===
- Preceded by: Lunar eclipse of June 25, 1926
- Followed by: Lunar eclipse of April 23, 1948

=== Lunar Saros 110 ===
- Preceded by: Lunar eclipse of May 15, 1919
- Followed by: Lunar eclipse of June 5, 1955

=== Inex ===
- Preceded by: Lunar eclipse of June 14, 1908
- Followed by: Lunar eclipse of May 4, 1966

=== Triad ===
- Preceded by: Lunar eclipse of July 24, 1850
- Followed by: Lunar eclipse of March 25, 2024

=== Lunar eclipses of 1937–1940 ===
This eclipse is a member of a semester series. An eclipse in a semester series of lunar eclipses repeats approximately every 177 days and 4 hours (a semester) at alternating nodes of the Moon's orbit.

The penumbral lunar eclipse on March 23, 1940 occurs in the next lunar year eclipse set.

Lunar eclipse series sets from 1937 to 1940
Ascending node				Descending node			
Saros	Date Viewing	Type Chart	Gamma	Saros	Date Viewing	Type Chart	Gamma
110	1937 May 25	Penumbral	−1.1582	115	1937 Nov 18	Partial	0.9421
120	1938 May 14	Total	−0.3994	125	1938 Nov 07	Total	0.2739
130	1939 May 03	Total	0.3693	135	1939 Oct 28	Partial	−0.4581
140	1940 Apr 22	Penumbral	1.0741	145	1940 Oct 16	Penumbral	−1.1925

=== Saros 110 ===
This eclipse is a part of Saros series 110, repeating every 18 years, 11 days, and containing 72 events. The series started with a penumbral lunar eclipse on May 28, 747 AD. It contains partial eclipses from August 23, 891 AD through April 18, 1288; total eclipses from April 29, 1306 through September 5, 1522; and a second set of partial eclipses from September 16, 1540 through April 22, 1883. The series ends at member 72 as a penumbral eclipse on July 18, 2027.

The longest duration of totality was produced by member 38 at 103 minutes, 8 seconds on July 3, 1414. All eclipses in this series occur at the Moon’s ascending node of orbit.

Greatest	First			
The greatest eclipse of the series occurred on 1414 Jul 03, lasting 103 minutes, 8 seconds.	Penumbral	Partial	Total	Central
The greatest eclipse of the series occurred on 1414 Jul 03, lasting 103 minutes, 8 seconds.	747 May 28	891 Aug 23	1306 Apr 29	1360 May 31
The greatest eclipse of the series occurred on 1414 Jul 03, lasting 103 minutes, 8 seconds.	Last			
The greatest eclipse of the series occurred on 1414 Jul 03, lasting 103 minutes, 8 seconds.	Central	Total	Partial	Penumbral
The greatest eclipse of the series occurred on 1414 Jul 03, lasting 103 minutes, 8 seconds.	1468 Aug 04	1522 Sep 05	1883 Apr 22	2027 Jul 18

Eclipses are tabulated in three columns; every third eclipse in the same column is one exeligmos apart, so they all cast shadows over approximately the same parts of the Earth.

Series members 60–72 occur between 1801 and 2027:
60	61	62
1811 Mar 10	1829 Mar 20	1847 Mar 31
63	64	65
1865 Apr 11	1883 Apr 22	1901 May 03
66	67	68
1919 May 15	1937 May 25	1955 Jun 05
69	70	71
1973 Jun 15	1991 Jun 27	2009 Jul 07
72
2027 Jul 18

=== Tritos series ===
This eclipse is a part of a tritos cycle, repeating at alternating nodes every 135 synodic months (≈ 3986.63 days, or 11 years minus 1 month). Their appearance and longitude are irregular due to a lack of synchronization with the anomalistic month (period of perigee), but groupings of 3 tritos cycles (≈ 33 years minus 3 months) come close (≈ 434.044 anomalistic months), so eclipses are similar in these groupings.

Series members between 1817 and 2200
1817 May 01 (Saros 99)	1828 Mar 31 (Saros 100)	1839 Feb 28 (Saros 101)	1850 Jan 28 (Saros 102)	1860 Dec 28 (Saros 103)
		1893 Sep 25 (Saros 106)		1915 Jul 26 (Saros 108)
1926 Jun 25 (Saros 109)	1937 May 25 (Saros 110)	1948 Apr 23 (Saros 111)	1959 Mar 24 (Saros 112)	1970 Feb 21 (Saros 113)
1981 Jan 20 (Saros 114)	1991 Dec 21 (Saros 115)	2002 Nov 20 (Saros 116)	2013 Oct 18 (Saros 117)	2024 Sep 18 (Saros 118)
2035 Aug 19 (Saros 119)	2046 Jul 18 (Saros 120)	2057 Jun 17 (Saros 121)	2068 May 17 (Saros 122)	2079 Apr 16 (Saros 123)
2090 Mar 15 (Saros 124)	2101 Feb 14 (Saros 125)	2112 Jan 14 (Saros 126)	2122 Dec 13 (Saros 127)	2133 Nov 12 (Saros 128)
2144 Oct 11 (Saros 129)	2155 Sep 11 (Saros 130)	2166 Aug 11 (Saros 131)	2177 Jul 11 (Saros 132)	2188 Jun 09 (Saros 133)
2199 May 10 (Saros 134)

=== Inex series ===
This eclipse is a part of the long period inex cycle, repeating at alternating nodes, every 358 synodic months (≈ 10,571.95 days, or 29 years minus 20 days). Their appearance and longitude are irregular due to a lack of synchronization with the anomalistic month (period of perigee). However, groupings of 3 inex cycles (≈ 87 years minus 2 months) comes close (≈ 1,151.02 anomalistic months), so eclipses are similar in these groupings.

Series members between 1801 and 2200
1821 Aug 13 (Saros 106)	1850 Jul 24 (Saros 107)	1879 Jul 03 (Saros 108)
1908 Jun 14 (Saros 109)	1937 May 25 (Saros 110)	1966 May 04 (Saros 111)
1995 Apr 15 (Saros 112)	2024 Mar 25 (Saros 113)	2053 Mar 04 (Saros 114)
2082 Feb 13 (Saros 115)	2111 Jan 25 (Saros 116)	2140 Jan 04 (Saros 117)
2168 Dec 14 (Saros 118)	2197 Nov 24 (Saros 119)	

=== Half-Saros cycle ===
A lunar eclipse will be preceded and followed by solar eclipses by 9 years and 5.5 days (a half saros). This lunar eclipse is related to one total and one partial = two solar eclipses of Solar Saros 117.

May 19, 1928	May 30, 1946

== See also ==
- List of lunar eclipses
- List of 20th-century lunar eclipses
