= May 1966 lunar eclipse =

Penumbral lunar eclipse May 4, 1966

- Penumbral eclipse
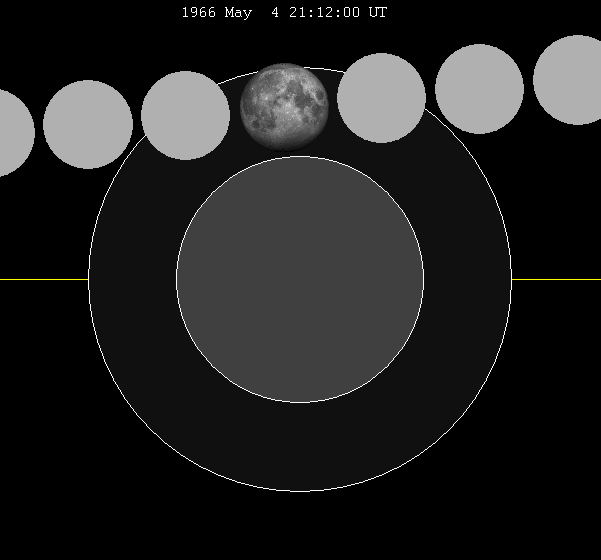
- The Moon's hourly motion shown right to left
- Date: May 4, 1966
- Gamma: 1.0554
- Magnitude: −0.0727
- Saros cycle: 111 (64 of 71)
- Penumbral: 245 minutes, 57 seconds
Contacts (UTC)
- P1: 19:08:27
- Greatest: 21:11:29
- P4: 23:14:24

A penumbral lunar eclipse occurred at the Moon’s descending node of orbit on Wednesday, May 4, 1966, with an umbral magnitude of −0.0727. A lunar eclipse occurs when the Moon moves into the Earth's shadow, causing the Moon to be darkened. A penumbral lunar eclipse occurs when part or all of the Moon's near side passes into the Earth's penumbra. Unlike a solar eclipse, which can only be viewed from a relatively small area of the world, a lunar eclipse may be viewed from anywhere on the night side of Earth. Occurring about 2.75 days after perigee (on May 1, 1966, at 15:20 UTC), the Moon's apparent diameter was larger.

== Visibility ==
The eclipse was completely visible over Africa, Europe, the western half of Asia, and Antarctica, seen rising over South America and the Atlantic Ocean and setting over east Asia and Australia.

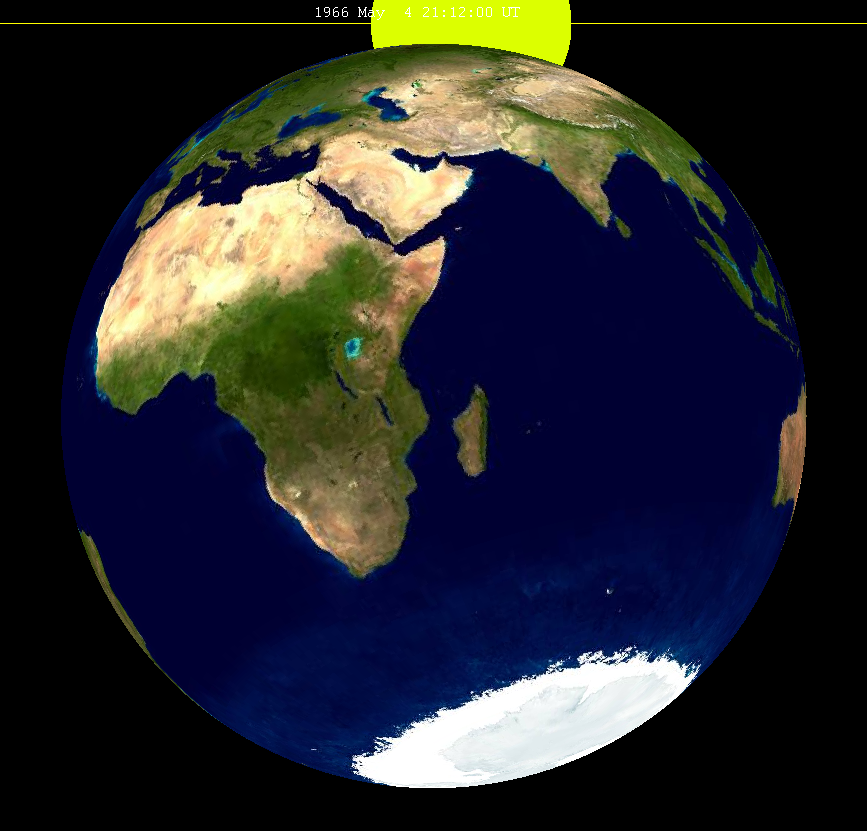
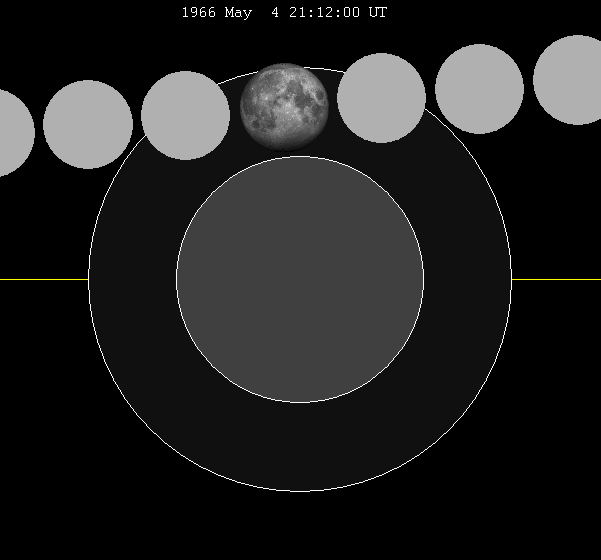

== Eclipse details ==
Shown below is a table displaying details about this particular lunar eclipse. It describes various parameters pertaining to this eclipse.

May 4, 1966 Lunar Eclipse Parameters
Parameter	Value
Penumbral Magnitude	0.91576
Umbral Magnitude	−0.07272
Gamma	1.05536
Sun Right Ascension	02h45m54.8s
Sun Declination	+16°01'34.2"
Sun Semi-Diameter	15'51.5"
Sun Equatorial Horizontal Parallax	08.7"
Moon Right Ascension	14h47m34.9s
Moon Declination	-15°04'18.1"
Moon Semi-Diameter	16'02.6"
Moon Equatorial Horizontal Parallax	0°58'52.9"
ΔT	36.8 s

== Eclipse season ==
This eclipse is part of an eclipse season, a period, roughly every six months, when eclipses occur. Only two (or occasionally three) eclipse seasons occur each year, and each season lasts about 35 days and repeats just short of six months (173 days) later; thus two full eclipse seasons always occur each year. Either two or three eclipses happen each eclipse season. In the sequence below, each eclipse is separated by a fortnight.

Eclipse season of May 1966
May 4 Descending node (full moon)	May 20 Ascending node (new moon)
Penumbral lunar eclipse Lunar Saros 111	Annular solar eclipse Solar Saros 137

== Related eclipses ==
=== Eclipses in 1966 ===
- A penumbral lunar eclipse on May 4.
- An annular solar eclipse on May 20.
- A penumbral lunar eclipse on October 29.
- A total solar eclipse on November 12.

=== Metonic ===
- Preceded by: Lunar eclipse of July 17, 1962
- Followed by: Lunar eclipse of February 21, 1970

=== Tzolkinex ===
- Preceded by: Lunar eclipse of March 24, 1959
- Followed by: Lunar eclipse of June 15, 1973

=== Half-Saros ===
- Preceded by: Solar eclipse of April 30, 1957
- Followed by: Solar eclipse of May 11, 1975

=== Tritos ===
- Preceded by: Lunar eclipse of June 5, 1955
- Followed by: Lunar eclipse of April 4, 1977

=== Lunar Saros 111 ===
- Preceded by: Lunar eclipse of April 23, 1948
- Followed by: Lunar eclipse of May 15, 1984

=== Inex ===
- Preceded by: Lunar eclipse of May 25, 1937
- Followed by: Lunar eclipse of April 15, 1995

=== Triad ===
- Preceded by: Lunar eclipse of July 3, 1879
- Followed by: Lunar eclipse of March 4, 2053

=== Lunar eclipses of 1966–1969 ===
This eclipse is a member of a semester series. An eclipse in a semester series of lunar eclipses repeats approximately every 177 days and 4 hours (a semester) at alternating nodes of the Moon's orbit.

The penumbral lunar eclipse on August 27, 1969 occurs in the next lunar year eclipse set.

Lunar eclipse series sets from 1966 to 1969
Descending node				Ascending node			
Saros	Date Viewing	Type Chart	Gamma	Saros	Date Viewing	Type Chart	Gamma
111	1966 May 04	Penumbral	1.0554	116	1966 Oct 29	Penumbral	−1.0600
121	1967 Apr 24	Total	0.2972	126	1967 Oct 18	Total	−0.3653
131	1968 Apr 13	Total	−0.4173	136	1968 Oct 06	Total	0.3605
141	1969 Apr 02	Penumbral	−1.1765	146	1969 Sep 25	Penumbral	1.0656

=== Metonic series ===
The metonic cycle repeats nearly exactly every 19 years and represents a Saros cycle plus one lunar year. Because it occurs on the same calendar date, the Earth's shadow will in nearly the same location relative to the background stars.

Metonic events: May 4 and October 28
Descending node	Ascending node
1. 1966 May 4 - Penumbral (111); 2. 1985 May 4 - Total (121); 3. 2004 May 4 - Total (131); 4. 2023 May 5 - Penumbral (141)	1. 1966 Oct 29 - Penumbral (116); 2. 1985 Oct 28 - Total (126); 3. 2004 Oct 28 - Total (136); 4. 2023 Oct 28 - Partial (146); 5. 2042 Oct 28 - Penumbral (156)

=== Saros 111 ===
This eclipse is a part of Saros series 111, repeating every 18 years, 11 days, and containing 71 events. The series started with a penumbral lunar eclipse on June 10, 830 AD. It contains partial eclipses from September 14, 992 AD through April 8, 1335; total eclipses from April 19, 1353 through August 4, 1533; and a second set of partial eclipses from August 16, 1551 through April 23, 1948. The series ends at member 71 as a penumbral eclipse on July 19, 2092.

The longest duration of totality was produced by member 35 at 106 minutes, 14 seconds on June 12, 1443. All eclipses in this series occur at the Moon’s descending node of orbit.

Greatest	First			
The greatest eclipse of the series occurred on 1443 Jun 12, lasting 106 minutes, 14 seconds.	Penumbral	Partial	Total	Central
The greatest eclipse of the series occurred on 1443 Jun 12, lasting 106 minutes, 14 seconds.	830 Jun 10	992 Sep 14	1353 Apr 19	1389 May 10
The greatest eclipse of the series occurred on 1443 Jun 12, lasting 106 minutes, 14 seconds.	Last			
The greatest eclipse of the series occurred on 1443 Jun 12, lasting 106 minutes, 14 seconds.	Central	Total	Partial	Penumbral
The greatest eclipse of the series occurred on 1443 Jun 12, lasting 106 minutes, 14 seconds.	1497 Jul 14	1533 Aug 04	1948 Apr 23	2092 Jul 19

Eclipses are tabulated in three columns; every third eclipse in the same column is one exeligmos apart, so they all cast shadows over approximately the same parts of the Earth.

Series members 55–71 occur between 1801 and 2092:
55	56	57
1804 Jan 26	1822 Feb 06	1840 Feb 17
58	59	60
1858 Feb 27	1876 Mar 10	1894 Mar 21
61	62	63
1912 Apr 01	1930 Apr 13	1948 Apr 23
64	65	66
1966 May 04	1984 May 15	2002 May 26
67	68	69
2020 Jun 05	2038 Jun 17	2056 Jun 27
70	71	
2074 Jul 08	2092 Jul 19	

=== Tritos series ===
This eclipse is a part of a tritos cycle, repeating at alternating nodes every 135 synodic months (≈ 3986.63 days, or 11 years minus 1 month). Their appearance and longitude are irregular due to a lack of synchronization with the anomalistic month (period of perigee), but groupings of 3 tritos cycles (≈ 33 years minus 3 months) come close (≈ 434.044 anomalistic months), so eclipses are similar in these groupings.

Series members between 1835 and 2200
1835 May 12 (Saros 99)	1846 Apr 11 (Saros 100)		1868 Feb 08 (Saros 102)	1879 Jan 08 (Saros 103)
				1933 Aug 05 (Saros 108)
1944 Jul 06 (Saros 109)	1955 Jun 05 (Saros 110)	1966 May 04 (Saros 111)	1977 Apr 04 (Saros 112)	1988 Mar 03 (Saros 113)
1999 Jan 31 (Saros 114)	2009 Dec 31 (Saros 115)	2020 Nov 30 (Saros 116)	2031 Oct 30 (Saros 117)	2042 Sep 29 (Saros 118)
2053 Aug 29 (Saros 119)	2064 Jul 28 (Saros 120)	2075 Jun 28 (Saros 121)	2086 May 28 (Saros 122)	2097 Apr 26 (Saros 123)
2108 Mar 27 (Saros 124)	2119 Feb 25 (Saros 125)	2130 Jan 24 (Saros 126)	2140 Dec 23 (Saros 127)	2151 Nov 24 (Saros 128)
2162 Oct 23 (Saros 129)	2173 Sep 21 (Saros 130)	2184 Aug 21 (Saros 131)	2195 Jul 22 (Saros 132)	

=== Inex series ===
This eclipse is a part of the long period inex cycle, repeating at alternating nodes, every 358 synodic months (≈ 10,571.95 days, or 29 years minus 20 days). Their appearance and longitude are irregular due to a lack of synchronization with the anomalistic month (period of perigee). However, groupings of 3 inex cycles (≈ 87 years minus 2 months) comes close (≈ 1,151.02 anomalistic months), so eclipses are similar in these groupings.

Series members between 1801 and 2200
1821 Aug 13 (Saros 106)	1850 Jul 24 (Saros 107)	1879 Jul 03 (Saros 108)
1908 Jun 14 (Saros 109)	1937 May 25 (Saros 110)	1966 May 04 (Saros 111)
1995 Apr 15 (Saros 112)	2024 Mar 25 (Saros 113)	2053 Mar 04 (Saros 114)
2082 Feb 13 (Saros 115)	2111 Jan 25 (Saros 116)	2140 Jan 04 (Saros 117)
2168 Dec 14 (Saros 118)	2197 Nov 24 (Saros 119)	

=== Half-Saros cycle ===
A lunar eclipse will be preceded and followed by solar eclipses by 9 years and 5.5 days (a half saros). This lunar eclipse is related to two solar eclipses of Solar Saros 118.

April 30, 1957	May 11, 1975

== See also ==
- List of lunar eclipses
- List of 20th-century lunar eclipses
