= Lunar Saros 110 =

Series of lunar eclipses

Saros cycle series 110 for lunar eclipses occurs at the moon's ascending node, 18 years 11 and 1/3 days. It contains 71 or 72 events, depending on multiple calculations. Solar Saros 117 interleaves with this lunar Saros with an event occurring every 9 years 5 days alternating between each saros series.

This lunar saros is linked to Solar Saros 117.

Cat.	Saros	Mem	Date	Time UT (hr:mn)	Type	Gamma	Magnitude	Duration (min)			Contacts UT (hr:mn)						Chart
Cat.	Saros	Mem	Date	Greatest	Type	Gamma	Magnitude	Pen.	Par.	Tot.	P1	P4	U1	U2	U3	U4	Chart
06635	110	1	747 May 28	21:51:50	Penumbral	1.5242	-0.9101	47.7			21:27:59	22:15:41					
06679	110	2	765 Jun 08	5:18:46	Penumbral	1.4527	-0.7784	106.1			4:25:43	6:11:49					
06722	110	3	783 Jun 19	12:44:53	Penumbral	1.3803	-0.6453	141.1			11:34:20	13:55:26					
06764	110	4	801 Jun 29	20:12:23	Penumbral	1.3087	-0.5141	167.5			18:48:38	21:36:08					
06805	110	5	819 Jul 11	3:42:30	Penumbral	1.2391	-0.3868	188.6			2:08:12	5:16:48					
06846	110	6	837 Jul 21	11:16:30	Penumbral	1.1723	-0.2651	206.0			9:33:30	12:59:30					
06886	110	7	855 Aug 01	18:55:01	Penumbral	1.1094	-0.1506	220.5			17:04:46	20:45:16					
06927	110	8	873 Aug 12	2:38:51	Penumbral	1.0508	-0.0444	232.7			0:42:30	4:35:12					
06969	110	9	891 Aug 23	10:29:38	Partial	0.9978	0.0513	242.8	49.0		8:28:14	12:31:02	10:05:08			10:54:08	
07010	110	10	909 Sep 02	18:27:38	Partial	0.9507	0.1360	251.2	78.9		16:22:02	20:33:14	17:48:11			19:07:05	
07050	110	11	927 Sep 14	2:32:30	Partial	0.9095	0.2098	258.1	97.1		0:23:27	4:41:33	1:43:57			3:21:03	
07091	110	12	945 Sep 24	10:45:43	Partial	0.8754	0.2706	263.7	109.4		8:33:52	12:57:34	9:51:01			11:40:25	
07132	110	13	963 Oct 05	19:06:28	Partial	0.8480	0.3190	268.1	118.0		16:52:25	21:20:31	18:07:28			20:05:28	
07173	110	14	981 Oct 16	3:34:43	Partial	0.8268	0.3560	271.6	124.1		1:18:55	5:50:31	2:32:40			4:36:46	
07215	110	15	999 Oct 27	12:08:14	Partial	0.8103	0.3844	274.4	128.6		9:51:02	14:25:26	11:03:56			13:12:32	
07259	110	16	1017 Nov 06	20:48:25	Partial	0.7998	0.4021	276.4	131.3		18:30:13	23:06:37	19:42:46			21:54:04	
07303	110	17	1035 Nov 18	5:32:39	Partial	0.7934	0.4124	277.9	133.0		3:13:42	7:51:36	4:26:09			6:39:09	
07348	110	18	1053 Nov 28	14:20:20	Partial	0.7901	0.4172	279.0	133.9		12:00:50	16:39:50	13:13:23			15:27:17	
07392	110	19	1071 Dec 09	23:09:02	Partial	0.7883	0.4194	279.9	134.4		20:49:05	1:28:59	22:01:50			0:16:14	
07437	110	20	1089 Dec 20	7:58:18	Partial	0.7874	0.4203	280.7	134.7		5:37:57	10:18:39	6:50:57			9:05:39	
07484	110	21	1107 Dec 31	16:45:56	Partial	0.7857	0.4227	281.6	135.3		14:25:08	19:06:44	15:38:17			17:53:35	
07530	110	22	1126 Jan 11	1:29:55	Partial	0.7818	0.4296	282.7	136.5		23:08:34	3:51:16	0:21:40			2:38:10	
07576	110	23	1144 Jan 22	10:09:46	Partial	0.775	0.4418	284.2	138.5		7:47:40	12:31:52	9:00:31			11:19:01	
07623	110	24	1162 Feb 1	18:43:30	Partial	0.7638	0.4622	286.2	141.6		16:20:24	21:06:36	17:32:42			19:54:18	
07670	110	25	1180 Feb 13	3:10:08	Partial	0.7474	0.4925	288.8	145.8		0:45:44	5:34:32	1:57:14			4:23:02	
07716	110	26	1198 Feb 23	11:28:24	Partial	0.7245	0.5345	292.1	151.3		9:02:21	13:54:27	10:12:45			12:44:03	
07762	110	27	1216 Mar 05	19:38:20	Partial	0.6956	0.5878	296.0	157.7		17:10:20	22:06:20	18:19:29			20:57:11	
07808	110	28	1234 Mar 17	3:39:29	Partial	0.6601	0.6531	300.5	165.0		1:09:14	6:09:44	2:16:59			5:01:59	
07853	110	29	1252 Mar 27	11:30:34	Partial	0.6170	0.7323	305.5	172.9		8:57:49	14:03:19	10:04:07			12:57:01	
07897	110	30	1270 Apr 07	19:13:13	Partial	0.5674	0.8231	310.8	181.1		16:37:49	21:48:37	17:42:40			20:43:46	
07942	110	31	1288 Apr 18	2:46:56	Partial	0.5112	0.9260	316.3	189.2		0:08:47	5:25:05	1:12:20			4:21:32	
07988	110	32	1306 Apr 29	10:13:32	Total	0.4499	1.0381	321.7	196.9	29.9	7:32:41	12:54:23	8:35:05	9:58:35	10:28:29	11:51:59	
08031	110	33	1324 May 9	17:31:33	Total	0.3823	1.1614	327.0	204.1	59.4	14:48:03	20:15:03	15:49:30	17:01:51	18:01:15	19:13:36	
08073	110	34	1342 May 21	0:44:45	Total	0.3114	1.2905	331.8	210.3	76.6	21:58:51	3:30:39	22:59:36	0:06:27	1:23:03	2:29:54	
08115	110	35	1360 May 31	7:51:57	Total	0.2362	1.4274	336.2	215.6	88.6	5:03:51	10:40:03	6:04:09	7:07:39	8:36:15	9:39:45	
08156	110	36	1378 Jun 11	14:55:52	Total	0.1591	1.5673	339.8	219.6	96.7	12:05:58	17:45:46	13:06:04	14:07:31	15:44:13	16:45:40	
08197	110	37	1396 Jun 21	21:56:41	Total	0.0803	1.7102	342.7	222.3	101.4	19:05:20	0:48:02	20:05:32	21:05:59	22:47:23	23:47:50	
08238	110	38	1414 Jul 03	4:57:15	Total	0.0020	1.8518	344.8	223.7	103.1	2:04:51	7:49:39	3:05:24	4:05:42	5:48:48	6:49:06	
08280	110	39	1432 Jul 13	11:58:17	Total	-0.0751	1.7154	346.1	223.7	101.9	9:05:14	14:51:20	10:06:26	11:07:20	12:49:14	13:50:08	
08321	110	40	1450 Jul 24	19:00:10	Total	-0.1507	1.5742	346.6	222.4	97.8	16:06:52	21:53:28	17:08:58	18:11:16	19:49:04	20:51:22	
08362	110	41	1468 Aug 04	2:06:04	Total	-0.2221	1.4404	346.4	220.0	90.8	23:12:52	4:59:16	0:16:04	1:20:40	2:51:28	3:56:04	
08402	110	42	1486 Aug 15	9:15:15	Total	-0.2900	1.3130	345.7	216.5	80.5	6:22:24	12:08:06	7:27:00	8:35:00	9:55:30	11:03:30	
08442	110	43	1504 Aug 25	16:30:40	Total	-0.3518	1.1966	344.6	212.3	66.5	13:38:22	19:22:58	14:44:31	15:57:25	17:03:55	18:16:49	
08483	110	44	1522 Sep 05	23:50:39	Total	-0.4089	1.0887	343.1	207.4	46.4	20:59:06	2:42:12	22:06:57	23:27:27	0:13:51	1:34:21	
08524	110	45	1540 Sep 16	7:18:56	Partial	-0.4584	0.9947	341.6	202.4		4:28:08	10:09:44	5:37:44			9:00:08	
08567	110	46	1558 Sep 27	14:53:07	Partial	-0.5022	0.9112	340.1	197.2		12:03:04	17:43:10	13:14:31			16:31:43	
08610	110	47	1576 Oct 07	22:35:11	Partial	-0.5385	0.8417	338.9	192.4		19:45:44	1:24:38	20:58:59			0:11:23	
08653	110	48	1594 Oct 29	6:23:44	Partial	-0.5687	0.7833	337.9	188.0		3:34:47	9:12:41	4:49:44			7:57:44	
08697	110	49	1612 Nov 08	14:19:56	Partial	-0.5915	0.7387	337.3	184.5		11:31:17	17:08:35	12:47:41			15:52:11	
08741	110	50	1630 Nov 19	22:20:56	Partial	-0.6100	0.7024	336.9	181.4		19:32:29	1:09:23	20:50:14			23:51:38	
08785	110	51	1648 Nov 30	6:26:42	Partial	-0.6238	0.6748	336.9	179.0		3:38:15	9:15:09	4:57:12			7:56:12	
08830	110	52	1666 Dec 11	14:35:36	Partial	-0.6344	0.6536	337.0	177.2		11:47:06	17:24:06	13:07:00			16:04:12	
08876	110	53	1684 Dec 21	22:47:25	Partial	-0.6415	0.6389	337.4	176.0		19:58:43	1:36:07	21:19:25			0:15:25	
08922	110	54	1703 Jan 03	6:58:07	Partial	-0.6493	0.6236	337.6	174.7		4:09:19	9:46:55	5:30:46			8:25:28	
08969	110	55	1721 Jan 13	15:08:19	Partial	-0.6568	0.6089	337.6	173.4		12:19:31	17:57:07	13:41:37			16:35:01	
09016	110	56	1739 Jan 24	23:14:14	Partial	-0.6674	0.5892	337.2	171.5		20:25:38	2:02:50	21:48:29			0:39:59	
09063	110	57	1757 Feb 04	7:16:54	Partial	-0.6801	0.5658	336.5	169.0		4:28:39	10:05:09	5:52:24			8:41:24	
09109	110	58	1775 Feb 15	15:10:58	Partial	-0.6990	0.5314	334.8	165.0		12:23:34	17:58:22	13:48:28			16:33:28	
09154	110	59	1793 Feb 25	22:59:34	Partial	-0.7218	0.4899	332.5	159.7		20:13:19	1:45:49	21:39:43			0:19:25	
09199	110	60	1811 Mar 10	6:37:39	Partial	-0.7527	0.4340	329.0	151.9		3:53:09	9:22:09	5:21:42			7:53:36	
09244	110	61	1829 Mar 20	14:08:14	Partial	-0.7891	0.3680	324.5	141.5		11:25:59	16:50:29	12:57:29			15:18:59	
09291	110	62	1847 Mar 31	21:27:03	Partial	-0.8345	0.2856	318.2	126.4		18:47:57	0:06:09	20:23:51			22:30:15	
09335	110	63	1865 Apr 11	4:38:10	Partial	-0.8856	0.1929	310.4	105.4		2:02:58	7:13:22	3:45:28			5:30:52	
09378	110	64	1883 Apr 22	11:38:29	Partial	-0.9448	0.0853	300.5	71.3		9:08:14	14:08:44	11:02:50			12:14:08	
09422	110	65	1901 May 03	18:30:38	Penumbral	-1.0101	-0.0334	288.2			16:06:32	20:54:44					
09464	110	66	1919 May 15	1:14:00	Penumbral	-1.0820	-0.1644	273.1			22:57:27	3:30:33					
09506	110	67	1937 May 25	7:51:34	Penumbral	-1.1581	-0.3033	254.7			5:44:13	9:58:55					
09547	110	68	1955 Jun 05	14:23:23	Penumbral	-1.2383	-0.4498	232.3			12:27:14	16:19:32					
09588	110	69	1973 Jun 15	20:50:41	Penumbral	-1.3216	-0.6020	204.6			19:08:23	22:32:59					
09629	110	70	1991 Jun 27	3:15:41	Penumbral	-1.4063	-0.7572	169.5			1:50:56	4:40:26					
09670	110	71	2009 Jul 07	9:39:43	Penumbral	-1.4915	-0.9133	121.5			8:38:58	10:40:28					
09711	110	72	2027 Jul 18	16:04:09	Penumbral	-1.5758	-1.0680	11.8			15:58:15	16:10:03					

== See also ==
- List of lunar eclipses
  - List of Saros series for lunar eclipses
