= Earth's shadow =

Shadow that Earth casts through its atmosphere and into outer space

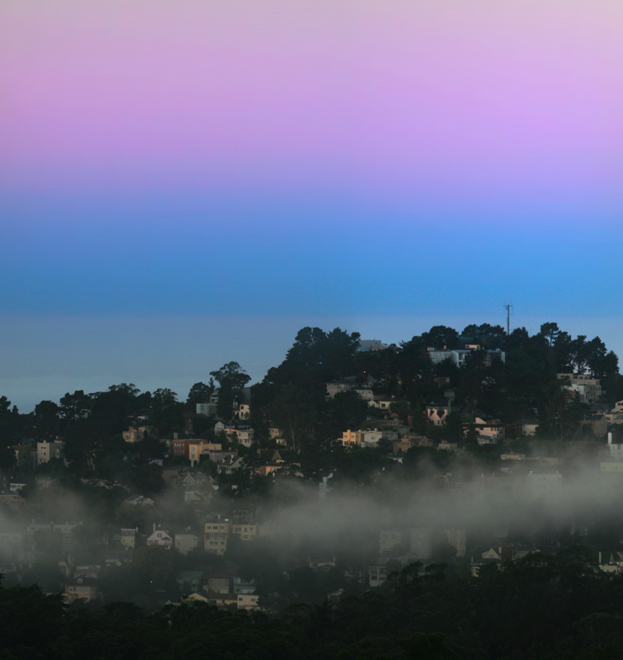
Earth's shadow (blue) and the Belt of Venus (pink) at dawn, seen above the Pacific Ocean (blue-grey), looking west from Twin Peaks, San Francisco

Earth's shadow (or Earth shadow) is the shadow that Earth itself casts through its atmosphere and into outer space, toward the antisolar point. During the twilight period (both early dusk and late dawn), the shadow's visible fringe —sometimes called the dark segment or twilight wedge—appears as a dark and diffuse band just above the horizon, most distinct when the sky is clear.

Since the angular diameters of the Sun and the Moon as viewed from Earth's surface are almost the same, the ratio of the length of Earth's shadow to the distance between Earth and the Moon will be almost equal to the ratio of the diameters of Earth and the Moon.

Since Earth's diameter is 3.7 times the Moon's, the length of the planet's umbra is correspondingly 3.7 times the average distance from the Moon to Earth: about 1.4 million km (870,000 mi). The diameter of Earth's shadow at lunar distance is about 9,000 km (5,600 mi), or 2.6 lunar diameters, which allows observation of total lunar eclipses from Earth.

== Appearance ==
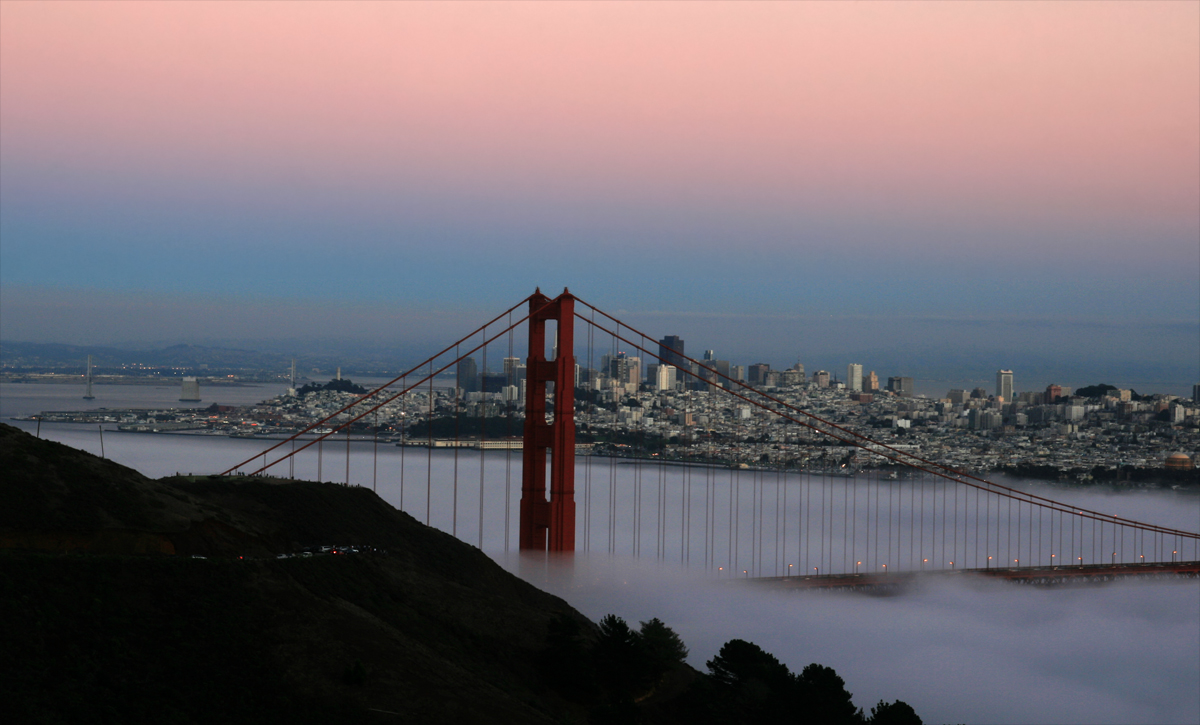
Earth's shadow and the Belt of Venus at dusk, looking east from the Marin Headlands just north of San Francisco in October 2010. (Note: A thin layer of greyish cloud partially obscures the horizon in this image.)

Earth's shadow cast onto the atmosphere can be viewed during the "civil" stage of twilight, assuming the sky is clear and the horizon is relatively unobstructed. The shadow's fringe appears as a dark bluish to purplish band that stretches over 180° of the horizon opposite the Sun, i.e. in the eastern sky at dusk and in the western sky at dawn. Before sunrise, Earth's shadow appears to recede as the Sun rises; after sunset, the shadow appears to rise as the Sun sets.

Earth's shadow is best seen when the horizon is low, such as over the sea, and when the sky conditions are clear. In addition, the higher the observer's elevation is to view the horizon, the sharper the shadow appears.

== Belt of Venus ==
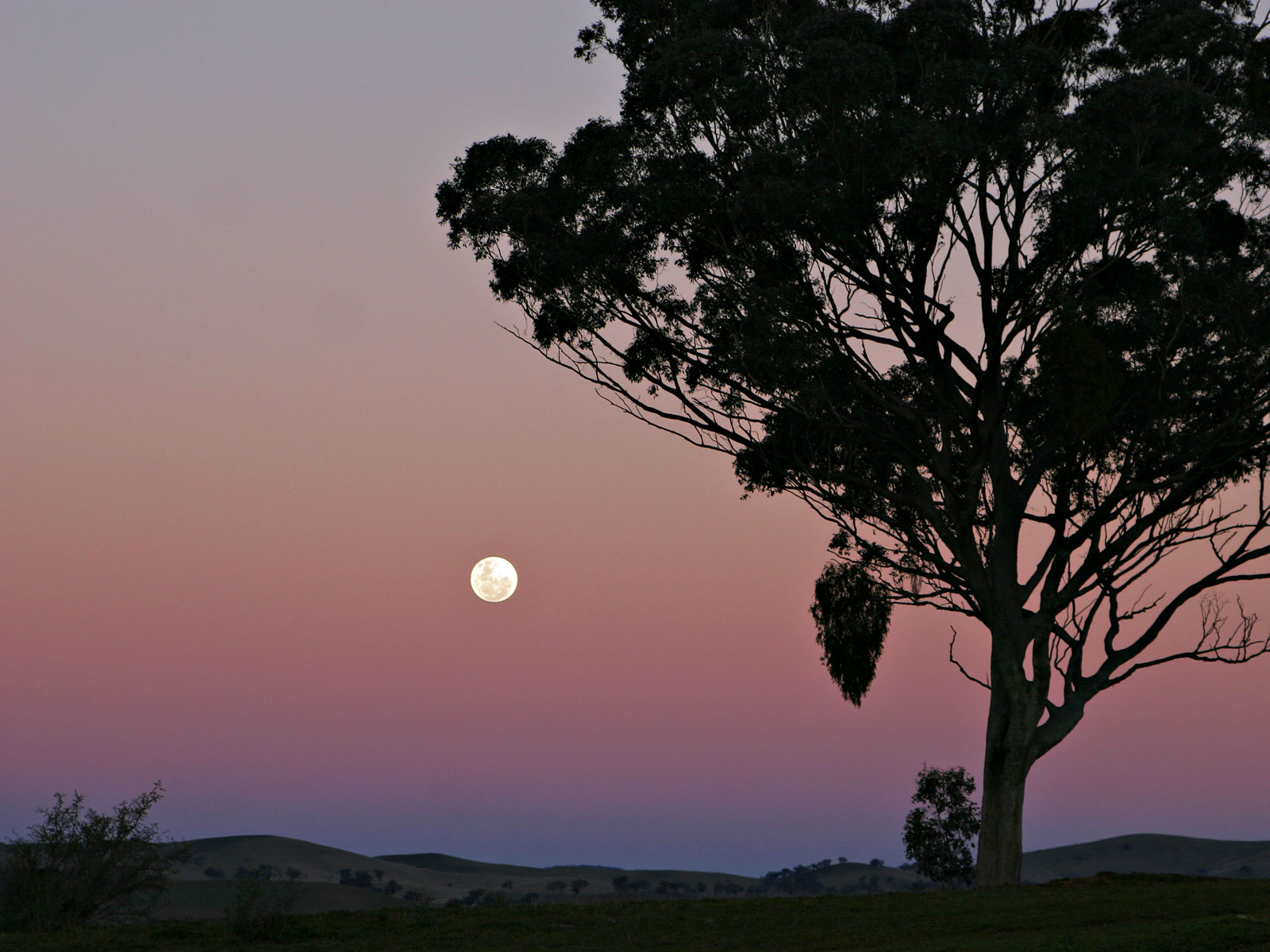
A full moon rising, as seen through the Belt of Venus. A very small part of the Earth's shadow (dark blue) is also visible in this image, but the horizon here is too high for more of the Earth's shadow to be seen.

A related phenomenon in the same part of the sky is the Belt of Venus, or anti-twilight arch, a pinkish band visible above the bluish shade of Earth's shadow, named after the planet Venus which, when visible, is typically located in this region of the sky. No defined line divides the Earth's shadow and the Belt of Venus; one colored band blends into the other in the sky.

The Belt of Venus is quite a different phenomenon from the afterglow, which appears in the geometrically opposite part of the sky.

=== Color ===
When the Sun is near the horizon around sunset or sunrise, the sunlight appears reddish. This is because the light rays are penetrating an especially thick layer of the atmosphere, which works as a filter, scattering all but the longer (redder) wavelengths.

From the observer's perspective, the red sunlight directly illuminates small particles in the lower atmosphere in the sky opposite of the Sun. The red light is backscattered to the observer, which is the reason why the Belt of Venus appears pink.

The lower the setting Sun descends, the less defined the boundary between Earth's shadow and the Belt of Venus appears. This is because the setting Sun now illuminates a thinner part of the upper atmosphere. There the red light is not scattered because fewer particles are present, and the eye only sees the "normal" (usual) blue sky, which is due to Rayleigh scattering from air molecules. Eventually, both Earth's shadow and the Belt of Venus dissolve into the darkness of the night sky.

== Color of lunar eclipses ==
A total lunar eclipse on May 15, 2022, shows the reddish light falling on the Moon's surface.

Earth's shadow is as curved as the planet is, and its umbra extends 1,400,000 km (870,000 mi) into outer space. (The antumbra, however, extends indefinitely.) When the Sun, Earth, and the Moon are aligned perfectly (or nearly so), with Earth between the Sun and the Moon, Earth's shadow falls onto the lunar surface facing the night side of the planet, such that the shadow gradually darkens the full Moon, causing a lunar eclipse.

Even during a total lunar eclipse, a small amount of sunlight still reaches the Moon. This indirect sunlight has been refracted as it passed through Earth's atmosphere. The air molecules and particulates in Earth's atmosphere scatter the shorter wavelengths of this sunlight; thus, the longer wavelengths of reddish light reach the Moon, in the same way that light at sunset or sunrise appears reddish. This weak red illumination gives the eclipsed Moon a dimly reddish or copper color.

== See also ==
- Brocken spectre, the magnified shadow of an observer cast upon clouds opposite of the Sun's direction
