= Lists of lunar eclipses =

A lunar eclipse occurs when the Moon moves into the Earth's shadow, causing the Moon to be darkened.

== By type ==
- List of central lunar eclipses
- Total penumbral lunar eclipse

== By classification ==
- List of saros series for lunar eclipses – counts by saros number
- Tetrad – four total lunar eclipses within two years

== By era ==
- Lunar eclipses by century
- Historically significant lunar eclipses
- List of lunar eclipses in the 19th century
- List of lunar eclipses in the 20th century
- List of lunar eclipses in the 21st century
- List of lunar eclipses in the 22nd century

== See also ==
- Lists of solar eclipses
