= List of lunar eclipses in the 22nd century =

During the 22nd century, there will be 238 lunar eclipses of which 81 will be penumbral, 88 will be partial and 69 will be total. Of the total eclipses, 45 will be central, in the sense that the Moon will pass through the very center (axis) of the Earth's shadow (for more information see gamma). In the 22nd century, the greatest number of eclipses in one year is five, in 2132, though the years 2103, 2114, 2121, 2150, 2154, 2172, 2190, and 2197 will have four eclipses each. One month, October 2172, will feature two lunar eclipses, on October 2 and October 31. The predictions given here are by Fred Espenak of NASA's Goddard Space Flight Center.

The longest measured duration in which the Earth will completely cover the Moon, known as totality, will be during the lunar eclipse of June 9, 2123. This total lunar eclipse will have a maximum duration of 1 hour, 46 minutes, and 6 seconds. The longest possible duration of a total lunar eclipse is 1 hour and 47 minutes.^{[a]}

The table contains the date and time of the greatest eclipse (in dynamical time, which in this case is the time when the axis of the Earth's shadow passes over the Moon; this is in (Ephemeris Time). The number of the saros series that the eclipse belongs to is given, followed by the type of the eclipse (either total, partial or penumbral), the gamma of the eclipse (how centrally the Moon passed through the Earth's shadow), and both the penumbral and umbral magnitude of the eclipse (the fraction of the Moon's diameter obscured by the Earth). For each eclipse, the duration of the eclipse is given, as well as the eclipse's contacts (the points at which the Moon reaches and exits the Earth's penumbra and umbra).

Eclipses are listed in sets by lunar years, repeating every 12 months for each node. Ascending node eclipses are given a red background highlight, and descending node eclipses are given a blue background highlight.

== Eclipses ==
Date	Time of greatest eclipse (Terrestrial Time)	Saros	Type	Gamma	Magnitude		Duration (hr:min)		Contacts (UTC) (hr:min)				Chart	Visibility	Ref(s)
Date	Time of greatest eclipse (Terrestrial Time)	Saros	Type	Gamma	Pen.	Umb.	Par.	Tot.	U1	U2	U3	U4	Chart	Visibility	Ref(s)
February 14, 2101	02:47:52	125	Total	0.3584	2.2184	1.1825	3:28	1:03	01:04	02:16	03:20	04:32			^{[a]}^{[b]}
August 9, 2101	08:23:25	130	Total	−0.2864	2.3189	1.3458	3:28	1:21	06:39	07:43	09:04	10:08			^{[a]}^{[b]}
February 3, 2102	07:16:12	135	Total	−0.3514	2.2585	1.1686	3:38	1:04	05:27	06:44	07:48	09:05			^{[a]}^{[b]}
July 30, 2102	00:27:00	140	Total	0.4586	1.9873	1.0451	3:09	0:31	22:52	00:11	00:43	02:02			^{[a]}^{[b]}
January 23, 2103	06:31:50	145	Penumbral	−1.0357	1.0095	−0.0937	—		—						^{[a]}^{[b]}
June 20, 2103	09:34:01	112	Penumbral	−1.3492	0.3704	−0.6062	—		—						^{[a]}^{[b]}
July 19, 2103	17:26:31	150	Penumbral	1.2002	0.6328	−0.3220	—		—						^{[a]}^{[b]}
December 13, 2103	16:49:26	117	Penumbral	1.2239	0.6287	−0.4042	—		—						^{[a]}^{[b]}
June 8, 2104	19:36:28	122	Partial	−0.6362	1.7069	0.6746	2:57	—	18:08	—		21:05			^{[a]}^{[b]}
December 2, 2104	04:55:59	127	Partial	0.4910	1.9476	0.9661	3:07	—	03:23	—		06:29			^{[a]}^{[b]}
May 28, 2105	22:31:54	132	Total	0.1227	2.6687	1.5976	3:54	1:42	20:35	21:41	23:23	00:29			^{[a]}^{[b]}
November 21, 2105	20:39:47	137	Total	−0.1874	2.4976	1.5301	3:27	1:30	18:56	19:55	21:25	22:23			^{[a]}^{[b]}
May 17, 2106	23:04:29	142	Partial	0.8677	1.2975	0.2345	1:55	—	22:07	—		00:02			^{[a]}^{[b]}
November 11, 2106	11:20:00	147	Partial	−0.8947	1.2153	0.2171	1:42	—	10:29	—		12:11			^{[a]}^{[b]}
April 7, 2107	17:27:56	114	Penumbral	−1.1382	0.7671	−0.2283	—		—						^{[a]}^{[b]}
May 7, 2107	04:28:11	152	Penumbral	1.5588	0.0058	−1.0103	—		—						^{[a]}^{[b]}
October 2, 2107	05:21:02	119	Penumbral	1.1997	0.6911	−0.3775	—		—						^{[a]}^{[b]}
March 27, 2108	08:04:12	124	Total	−0.3982	2.1076	1.1467	3:15	0:55	06:27	07:37	08:32	09:42			^{[a]}^{[b]}
September 20, 2108	05:44:54	129	Partial	0.4884	2.0030	0.9213	3:25	—	04:02	—		07:27			^{[a]}^{[b]}
March 17, 2109	00:20:11	134	Total	0.2962	2.2989	1.3296	3:23	1:18	22:39	23:41	00:59	02:02			^{[a]}^{[b]}
September 9, 2109	07:40:46	139	Total	−0.2608	2.4024	1.3568	3:42	1:26	05:50	06:58	08:24	09:32			^{[a]}^{[b]}
March 6, 2110	13:35:03	144	Penumbral	1.0345	0.9686	−0.0491	—		—						^{[a]}^{[b]}
August 29, 2110	16:36:30	149	Partial	−0.9893	1.0365	0.0488	0:50	—	16:11	—		17:01			^{[a]}^{[b]}
January 25, 2111	02:00:47	116	Penumbral	−1.1833	0.7371	−0.3630	—		—						^{[a]}^{[b]}
July 21, 2111	00:50:57	121	Partial	0.8362	1.2938	0.3530	2:03	—	23:49	—		01:53			^{[a]}^{[b]}
January 14, 2112	01:04:16	126	Partial	−0.5087	1.9735	0.8764	3:20	—	23:24	—		02:44			^{[a]}^{[b]}
July 9, 2112	17:17:31	131	Total	0.1055	2.6471	1.6814	3:35	1:38	15:30	16:28	18:07	19:05			^{[a]}^{[b]}
January 2, 2113	04:20:37	136	Total	0.1964	2.5221	1.4735	3:40	1:32	02:31	03:35	05:07	06:11			^{[a]}^{[b]}
June 29, 2113	04:53:04	141	Partial	−0.6887	1.6035	0.5849	2:45	—	03:31	—		06:16			^{[a]}^{[b]}
December 22, 2113	14:56:19	146	Partial	0.8666	1.2644	0.2712	1:52	—	14:00	—		15:52			^{[a]}^{[b]}
May 19, 2114	18:05:11	113	Penumbral	1.3611	0.3984	−0.6770	—		—						^{[a]}^{[b]}
June 18, 2114	09:14:43	151	Penumbral	−1.4944	0.1478	−0.9157	—		—						^{[a]}^{[b]}
November 12, 2114	19:57:10	118	Penumbral	−1.1533	0.7270	−0.2439	—		—						^{[a]}^{[b]}
December 12, 2114	06:07:02	156	Penumbral	1.4932	0.1026	−0.8666	—		—						^{[a]}^{[b]}
May 8, 2115	19:19:01	123	Partial	0.5996	1.7849	0.7311	3:05	—	17:46	—		20:51			^{[a]}^{[b]}
November 2, 2115	09:34:10	128	Partial	−0.4919	1.9611	0.9498	3:12	—	07:58	—		11:10			^{[a]}^{[b]}
April 27, 2116	02:38:53	133	Total	−0.1746	2.5388	1.5364	3:38	1:35	00:50	01:52	03:26	04:28			^{[a]}^{[b]}
October 21, 2116	16:51:14	138	Total	0.2353	2.4586	1.3943	3:44	1:29	14:59	16:07	17:36	18:43			^{[a]}^{[b]}
April 16, 2117	16:29:34	143	Partial	−0.8852	1.2139	0.2530	1:47	—	15:36	—		17:23			^{[a]}^{[b]}
October 10, 2117	17:44:45	148	Partial	0.9675	1.1274	0.0387	0:48	—	17:21	—		18:09			^{[a]}^{[b]}
March 7, 2118	23:30:38	115	Penumbral	1.0496	0.9228	−0.0588	—		—						^{[a]}^{[b]}
August 31, 2118	04:49:19	120	Penumbral	−1.1543	0.7540	−0.2740	—		—						^{[a]}^{[b]}
February 25, 2119	11:02:45	125	Total	0.3765	2.1857	1.1490	3:27	0:58	09:19	10:34	11:32	12:46			^{[a]}^{[b]}
August 20, 2119	15:49:26	130	Total	−0.3538	2.1946	1.2227	3:23	1:07	14:08	15:16	16:23	17:31			^{[a]}^{[b]}
February 14, 2120	15:14:50	135	Total	−0.3371	2.2848	1.1950	3:39	1:08	13:25	14:41	15:49	17:04			^{[a]}^{[b]}
August 9, 2120	07:59:02	140	Total	0.3875	2.1182	1.1751	3:16	0:59	06:21	07:29	08:29	09:37			^{[a]}^{[b]}
February 2, 2121	14:30:08	145	Penumbral	−1.0235	1.0308	−0.0701	—		—						^{[a]}^{[b]}
June 30, 2121	16:47:22	112	Penumbral	−1.4272	0.2286	−0.7505	—		—						^{[a]}^{[b]}
July 30, 2121	00:50:12	150	Penumbral	1.1312	0.7610	−0.1968	—		—						^{[a]}^{[b]}
December 24, 2121	01:19:42	117	Penumbral	1.2261	0.6238	−0.4071	—		—						^{[a]}^{[b]}
June 20, 2122	02:25:15	122	Partial	−0.7177	1.5584	0.5240	2:40	—	01:05	—		03:45			^{[a]}^{[b]}
December 13, 2122	13:40:08	127	Partial	0.4979	1.9349	0.9536	3:05	—	12:07	—		15:13			^{[a]}^{[b]}
June 9, 2123	05:03:55	132	Total	0.0406	2.8189	1.7487	3:56	1:46	03:06	04:11	05:57	07:02			^{[a]}^{[b]}
December 3, 2123	05:21:35	137	Total	−0.1755	2.5208	1.5507	3:28	1:31	03:38	04:36	06:07	07:05			^{[a]}^{[b]}
May 28, 2124	05:48:24	142	Partial	0.7913	1.4356	0.3770	2:22	—	04:37	—		06:59			^{[a]}^{[b]}
November 21, 2124	19:44:46	147	Partial	−0.8808	1.2434	0.2401	1:47	—	18:51	—		20:38			^{[a]}^{[b]}
April 18, 2125	01:16:11	114	Penumbral	−1.1791	0.6890	−0.3005	—		—						^{[a]}^{[b]}
May 17, 2125	11:43:56	152	Penumbral	1.4923	0.1249	−0.8854	—		—						^{[a]}^{[b]}
October 12, 2125	12:40:29	119	Penumbral	1.2476	0.6061	−0.4679	—		—						^{[a]}^{[b]}
April 7, 2126	16:15:18	124	Total	−0.4346	2.0390	1.0817	3:12	0:42	14:40	15:54	16:36	17:51			^{[a]}^{[b]}
October 1, 2126	12:47:10	129	Partial	0.5446	1.9011	0.8169	3:17	—	11:09	—		14:26			^{[a]}^{[b]}
March 28, 2127	08:37:39	134	Total	0.2664	2.3531	1.3849	3:26	1:22	06:55	07:57	09:19	10:20			^{[a]}^{[b]}
September 20, 2127	14:53:25	139	Total	−0.2007	2.5126	1.4672	3:44	1:34	13:01	14:07	15:40	16:46			^{[a]}^{[b]}
March 16, 2128	21:43:29	144	Penumbral	1.0128	1.0086	−0.0093	—		—						^{[a]}^{[b]}
September 9, 2128	00:07:50	149	Partial	−0.9266	1.1513	0.1642	1:30	—	23:23	—		00:53			^{[a]}^{[b]}
February 4, 2129	09:59:43	116	Penumbral	−1.1959	0.7140	−0.3858	—		—						^{[a]}^{[b]}
July 31, 2129	08:21:49	121	Partial	0.9070	1.1644	0.2224	1:40	—	07:32	—		09:12			^{[a]}^{[b]}
January 24, 2130	09:07:38	126	Partial	−0.5173	1.9565	0.8619	3:19	—	07:28	—		10:47			^{[a]}^{[b]}
July 21, 2130	00:36:13	131	Total	0.1803	2.5114	1.5426	3:33	1:34	22:50	23:49	01:23	02:23			^{[a]}^{[b]}
January 13, 2131	12:47:16	136	Total	0.1914	2.5296	1.4842	3:40	1:33	10:57	12:01	13:34	14:37			^{[a]}^{[b]}
July 10, 2131	11:45:12	141	Partial	−0.6107	1.7483	0.7265	3:00	—	10:15	—		13:15			^{[a]}^{[b]}
January 2, 2132	23:41:38	146	Partial	0.8604	1.2750	0.2835	1:54	—	22:45	—		00:38			^{[a]}^{[b]}
May 30, 2132	00:40:07	113	Penumbral	1.4380	0.2563	−0.8169	—		—						^{[a]}^{[b]}
June 28, 2132	15:42:50	151	Penumbral	−1.4127	0.2981	−0.7663	—		—						^{[a]}^{[b]}
November 23, 2132	04:32:26	118	Penumbral	−1.1707	0.6968	−0.2776	—		—						^{[a]}^{[b]}
December 22, 2132	14:57:05	156	Penumbral	1.4873	0.1138	−0.8564	—		—						^{[a]}^{[b]}
May 19, 2133	02:13:33	123	Partial	0.6688	1.6553	0.6067	2:52	—	00:48	—		03:39			^{[a]}^{[b]}
November 12, 2133	17:47:22	128	Partial	−0.5157	1.9203	0.9033	3:09	—	16:13	—		19:22			^{[a]}^{[b]}
May 8, 2134	10:07:54	133	Total	−0.1152	2.6447	1.6482	3:39	1:39	08:18	09:18	10:57	11:57			^{[a]}^{[b]}
November 2, 2134	00:31:33	138	Total	0.2022	2.5222	1.4521	3:46	1:33	22:39	23:45	01:18	02:25			^{[a]}^{[b]}
April 28, 2135	00:23:46	143	Partial	−0.8344	1.3051	0.3483	2:03	—	23:22	—		01:25			^{[a]}^{[b]}
October 22, 2135	01:03:15	148	Partial	0.9242	1.2085	0.1164	1:23	—	00:22	—		01:45			^{[a]}^{[b]}
March 18, 2136	07:51:06	115	Penumbral	1.0778	0.8707	−0.1103	—		—						^{[a]}^{[b]}
April 16, 2136	17:05:52	153	Penumbral	−1.5241	0.0396	−0.9174	—		—						^{[a]}^{[b]}
September 10, 2136	12:02:17	120	Penumbral	−1.2134	0.6452	−0.3821	—		—						^{[a]}^{[b]}
March 7, 2137	19:10:52	125	Total	0.3992	2.1441	1.1069	3:26	0:50	17:28	18:46	19:36	20:54			^{[a]}^{[b]}
August 30, 2137	23:21:13	130	Total	−0.4171	2.0782	1.1069	3:17	0:48	21:43	22:57	23:45	01:00			^{[a]}^{[b]}
February 24, 2138	23:07:04	135	Total	−0.3178	2.3198	1.2306	3:41	1:13	21:17	22:31	23:44	00:58			^{[a]}^{[b]}
August 20, 2138	15:35:53	140	Total	0.3204	2.2421	1.2977	3:21	1:14	13:55	14:59	16:13	17:16			^{[a]}^{[b]}
February 13, 2139	22:25:23	145	Penumbral	−1.0082	1.0574	−0.0406	—		—						^{[a]}^{[b]}
July 12, 2139	23:58:53	112	Penumbral	−1.5055	0.0866	−0.8957	—		—						^{[a]}^{[b]}
August 10, 2139	08:15:14	150	Penumbral	1.0638	0.8865	−0.0749	—		—						^{[a]}^{[b]}
January 4, 2140	09:52:22	117	Penumbral	1.2270	0.6209	−0.4075	—		—						^{[a]}^{[b]}
June 30, 2140	09:10:22	122	Partial	−0.8012	1.4064	0.3695	2:18	—	08:01	—		10:20			^{[a]}^{[b]}
December 23, 2140	22:26:52	127	Partial	0.5028	1.9255	0.9450	3:05	—	20:55	—		23:59			^{[a]}^{[b]}
June 19, 2141	11:31:54	132	Total	−0.0446	2.8112	1.7415	3:56	1:46	09:34	10:39	12:25	13:30			^{[a]}^{[b]}
December 13, 2141	14:07:19	137	Total	−0.1671	2.5374	1.5652	3:28	1:32	12:23	13:21	14:53	15:51			^{[a]}^{[b]}
June 8, 2142	12:29:44	142	Partial	0.7118	1.5794	0.5247	2:43	—	11:08	—		13:51			^{[a]}^{[b]}
December 3, 2142	04:13:12	147	Partial	−0.8704	1.2648	0.2569	1:51	—	03:18	—		05:09			^{[a]}^{[b]}
April 29, 2143	08:58:21	114	Penumbral	−1.2256	0.6009	−0.3830	—		—						^{[a]}^{[b]}
May 28, 2143	18:56:25	152	Penumbral	1.4219	0.2513	−0.7536	—		—						^{[a]}^{[b]}
October 23, 2143	20:07:37	119	Penumbral	1.2885	0.5336	−0.5457	—		—						^{[a]}^{[b]}
April 18, 2144	00:17:29	124	Total	−0.4787	1.9563	1.0026	3:07	0:08	22:44	00:14	00:21	01:51			^{[a]}^{[b]}
October 11, 2144	19:59:13	129	Partial	0.5930	1.8136	0.7269	3:08	—	18:25	—		21:33			^{[a]}^{[b]}
April 7, 2145	16:45:07	134	Total	0.2285	2.4221	1.4550	3:28	1:27	15:01	16:01	17:29	18:29			^{[a]}^{[b]}
September 30, 2145	22:16:48	139	Total	−0.1486	2.6083	1.5628	3:46	1:38	20:24	21:28	23:06	00:10			^{[a]}^{[b]}
March 28, 2146	05:41:25	144	Partial	0.9832	1.0629	0.0448	0:49	—	05:17	—		06:06			^{[a]}^{[b]}
September 20, 2146	07:48:24	149	Partial	−0.8707	1.2537	0.2669	1:52	—	06:52	—		08:44			^{[a]}^{[b]}
February 15, 2147	17:54:09	116	Penumbral	−1.2114	0.6849	−0.4138	—		—						^{[a]}^{[b]}
August 11, 2147	15:53:56	121	Partial	0.9765	1.0378	0.0941	1:06	—	15:21	—		16:27			^{[a]}^{[b]}
September 9, 2147	23:08:30	159	Penumbral	−1.5372	0.0123	−0.9380	—		—						^{[a]}^{[b]}
February 4, 2148	17:10:39	126	Partial	−0.5265	1.9380	0.8465	3:17	—	15:32	—		18:49			^{[a]}^{[b]}
July 31, 2148	07:53:31	131	Total	0.2554	2.3755	1.4030	3:30	1:25	06:08	07:11	08:36	09:39			^{[a]}^{[b]}
January 23, 2149	21:14:16	136	Total	0.1859	2.5379	1.4962	3:40	1:33	19:24	20:28	22:01	23:04			^{[a]}^{[b]}
July 20, 2149	18:35:03	141	Partial	−0.5315	1.8957	0.8700	3:13	—	16:58	—		20:12			^{[a]}^{[b]}
January 13, 2150	08:28:27	146	Partial	0.8552	1.2834	0.2941	1:55	—	07:31	—		09:26			^{[a]}^{[b]}
June 10, 2150	07:11:40	113	Penumbral	1.5171	0.1101	−0.9612	—		—						^{[a]}^{[b]}
July 9, 2150	22:10:13	151	Penumbral	−1.3300	0.4505	−0.6151	—		—						^{[a]}^{[b]}
December 4, 2150	13:11:36	118	Penumbral	−1.1848	0.6727	−0.3051	—		—						^{[a]}^{[b]}
January 2, 2151	23:48:16	156	Penumbral	1.4828	0.1225	−0.8484	—		—						^{[a]}^{[b]}
May 30, 2151	09:06:00	123	Partial	0.7403	1.5216	0.4780	2:35	—	07:48	—		10:23			^{[a]}^{[b]}
November 24, 2151	02:05:01	128	Partial	−0.5350	1.8875	0.8651	3:07	—	00:32	—		03:39			^{[a]}^{[b]}
May 18, 2152	17:32:01	133	Total	−0.0511	2.7597	1.7688	3:40	1:41	15:42	16:41	18:23	19:22			^{[a]}^{[b]}
November 12, 2152	08:18:34	138	Total	0.1753	2.5743	1.4989	3:48	1:36	06:25	07:31	09:06	10:12			^{[a]}^{[b]}
May 8, 2153	08:11:25	143	Partial	−0.7781	1.4065	0.4535	2:18	—	07:02	—		09:21			^{[a]}^{[b]}
November 1, 2153	08:30:49	148	Partial	0.8881	1.2763	0.1811	1:43	—	07:39	—		09:22			^{[a]}^{[b]}
March 29, 2154	16:01:54	115	Penumbral	1.1135	0.8049	−0.1757	—		—						^{[a]}^{[b]}
April 28, 2154	01:01:16	153	Penumbral	−1.4784	0.1228	−0.8328	—		—						^{[a]}^{[b]}
September 21, 2154	19:25:52	120	Penumbral	−1.2646	0.5510	−0.4759	—		—						^{[a]}^{[b]}
October 21, 2154	09:22:49	158	Penumbral	1.5560	0.0348	−1.0286	—		—						^{[a]}^{[b]}
March 19, 2155	03:09:29	125	Total	0.4293	2.0892	1.0517	3:23	0:35	01:28	02:52	03:27	04:51			^{[a]}^{[b]}
September 11, 2155	06:59:54	130	Total	−0.4752	1.9715	1.0003	3:11	0:03	05:25	06:59	07:01	08:35			^{[a]}^{[b]}
March 7, 2156	06:50:56	135	Total	−0.2922	2.3663	1.2782	3:43	1:19	04:59	06:11	07:30	08:43			^{[a]}^{[b]}
August 30, 2156	23:17:19	140	Total	0.2569	2.3595	1.4132	3:25	1:24	21:35	22:35	23:59	01:00			^{[a]}^{[b]}
February 24, 2157	06:13:16	145	Partial	−0.9868	1.0949	0.0005	0:06	—	06:10	—		06:16			^{[a]}^{[b]}
August 20, 2157	15:43:15	150	Partial	0.9992	1.0070	0.0415	0:45	—	15:21	—		16:06			^{[a]}^{[b]}
January 14, 2158	18:26:32	117	Penumbral	1.2275	0.6184	−0.4068	—		—						^{[a]}^{[b]}
July 11, 2158	15:52:30	122	Partial	−0.8859	1.2525	0.2126	1:48	—	14:59	—		16:46			^{[a]}^{[b]}
January 4, 2159	07:15:58	127	Partial	0.5061	1.9189	0.9394	3:04	—	05:44	—		08:48			^{[a]}^{[b]}
June 30, 2159	17:56:47	132	Total	−0.1322	2.6504	1.5809	3:54	1:42	16:00	17:06	18:48	19:54			^{[a]}^{[b]}
December 24, 2159	22:56:46	137	Total	−0.1619	2.5478	1.5737	3:28	1:32	21:13	22:11	23:43	00:41			^{[a]}^{[b]}
June 18, 2160	19:06:46	142	Partial	0.6280	1.7313	0.6804	3:01	—	17:36	—		20:37			^{[a]}^{[b]}
December 13, 2160	12:46:54	147	Partial	−0.8650	1.2768	0.2646	1:52	—	11:51	—		13:43			^{[a]}^{[b]}
May 9, 2161	16:34:36	114	Penumbral	−1.2776	0.5027	−0.4757	—		—						^{[a]}^{[b]}
June 8, 2161	02:05:29	152	Penumbral	1.3475	0.3853	−0.6146	—		—						^{[a]}^{[b]}
November 3, 2161	03:42:22	119	Penumbral	1.3226	0.4736	−0.6107	—		—						^{[a]}^{[b]}
April 29, 2162	08:13:41	124	Partial	−0.5280	1.8642	0.9137	3:01	—	06:43	—		09:44			^{[a]}^{[b]}
October 23, 2162	03:20:31	129	Partial	0.6340	1.7395	0.6504	3:00	—	01:50	—		04:51			^{[a]}^{[b]}
April 19, 2163	00:46:04	134	Total	0.1858	2.5000	1.5338	3:30	1:32	23:01	00:00	01:32	02:31			^{[a]}^{[b]}
October 12, 2163	05:48:24	139	Total	−0.1026	2.6927	1.6471	3:46	1:41	03:55	04:58	06:39	07:42			^{[a]}^{[b]}
April 7, 2164	13:31:04	144	Partial	0.9479	1.1278	0.1095	1:16	—	12:53	—		14:09			^{[a]}^{[b]}
September 30, 2164	15:37:01	149	Partial	−0.8209	1.3449	0.3581	2:08	—	14:33	—		16:41			^{[a]}^{[b]}
February 26, 2165	01:40:30	116	Penumbral	−1.2329	0.6447	−0.4524	—		—						^{[a]}^{[b]}
August 21, 2165	23:30:48	121	Penumbral	1.0417	0.9193	−0.0269	—		—						^{[a]}^{[b]}
September 20, 2165	07:01:45	159	Penumbral	−1.4858	0.1074	−0.8447	—		—						^{[a]}^{[b]}
February 15, 2166	01:08:07	126	Partial	−0.5402	1.9109	0.8233	3:15	—	23:31	—		02:46			^{[a]}^{[b]}
August 11, 2166	15:13:33	131	Total	0.3273	2.2456	1.2688	3:26	1:13	13:30	14:37	15:50	16:57			^{[a]}^{[b]}
February 4, 2167	05:37:58	136	Total	0.1772	2.5517	1.5143	3:39	1:34	03:48	04:51	06:25	07:28			^{[a]}^{[b]}
August 1, 2167	01:25:24	141	Total	−0.4536	2.0407	1.0108	3:24	0:17	23:44	01:17	01:34	03:07			^{[a]}^{[b]}
January 24, 2168	17:13:54	146	Partial	0.8487	1.2940	0.3073	1:57	—	16:15	—		18:13			^{[a]}^{[b]}
July 20, 2168	04:36:14	151	Penumbral	−1.2454	0.6065	−0.4607	—		—						^{[a]}^{[b]}
December 14, 2168	21:55:48	118	Penumbral	−1.1945	0.6565	−0.3242	—		—						^{[a]}^{[b]}
January 13, 2169	08:40:15	156	Penumbral	1.4794	0.1288	−0.8423	—		—						^{[a]}^{[b]}
June 9, 2169	15:53:29	123	Partial	0.8158	1.3806	0.3416	2:13	—	14:47	—		17:00			^{[a]}^{[b]}
December 4, 2169	10:28:19	128	Partial	−0.5488	1.8648	0.8375	3:05	—	08:56	—		12:01			^{[a]}^{[b]}
May 30, 2170	00:51:38	133	Total	0.0174	2.8188	1.8330	3:39	1:42	23:02	00:01	01:42	02:41			^{[a]}^{[b]}
November 23, 2170	16:12:41	138	Total	0.1554	2.6134	1.5331	3:49	1:38	14:18	15:24	17:02	18:07			^{[a]}^{[b]}
May 19, 2171	15:53:14	143	Partial	−0.7166	1.5175	0.5680	2:32	—	14:37	—		17:09			^{[a]}^{[b]}
November 12, 2171	16:06:20	148	Partial	0.8584	1.3323	0.2343	1:56	—	15:08	—		17:04			^{[a]}^{[b]}
April 9, 2172	00:05:11	115	Penumbral	1.1548	0.7289	−0.2513	—		—						^{[a]}^{[b]}
May 8, 2172	08:49:33	153	Penumbral	−1.4275	0.2157	−0.7389	—		—						^{[a]}^{[b]}
October 2, 2172	02:57:59	120	Penumbral	−1.3098	0.4681	−0.5586	—		—						^{[a]}^{[b]}
October 31, 2172	17:05:31	158	Penumbral	1.5197	0.1016	−0.9623	—		—						^{[a]}^{[b]}
March 29, 2173	10:58:39	125	Partial	0.4662	2.0215	0.9839	3:20	—	09:19	—		12:39			^{[a]}^{[b]}
September 21, 2173	14:46:33	130	Partial	−0.5272	1.8761	0.9047	3:04	—	13:15	—		16:19			^{[a]}^{[b]}
March 18, 2174	14:27:04	135	Total	−0.2605	2.4236	1.3371	3:46	1:25	12:34	13:44	15:10	16:20			^{[a]}^{[b]}
September 11, 2174	07:04:16	140	Total	0.1982	2.4683	1.5197	3:27	1:30	05:21	06:19	07:49	08:48			^{[a]}^{[b]}
March 7, 2175	13:56:05	145	Partial	−0.9608	1.1406	0.0502	0:55	—	13:29	—		14:23			^{[a]}^{[b]}
August 31, 2175	23:15:15	150	Partial	0.9385	1.1207	0.1506	1:25	—	22:33	—		23:58			^{[a]}^{[b]}
January 26, 2176	02:59:51	117	Penumbral	1.2292	0.6133	−0.4082	—		—						^{[a]}^{[b]}
July 21, 2176	22:33:03	122	Partial	−0.9707	1.0986	0.0553	0:56	—	22:05	—		23:01			^{[a]}^{[b]}
January 14, 2177	16:05:05	127	Partial	0.5099	1.9112	0.9333	3:03	—	14:33	—		17:37			^{[a]}^{[b]}
July 11, 2177	00:21:31	132	Total	−0.2199	2.4896	1.4199	3:50	1:33	22:26	23:35	01:08	02:17			^{[a]}^{[b]}
January 4, 2178	07:46:22	137	Total	−0.1570	2.5574	1.5820	3:29	1:33	06:02	07:00	08:33	09:31			^{[a]}^{[b]}
June 30, 2178	01:44:47	142	Partial	0.5438	1.8841	0.8364	3:15	—	00:07	—		03:22			^{[a]}^{[b]}
December 24, 2178	21:22:26	147	Partial	−0.8614	1.2853	0.2694	1:54	—	20:26	—		22:19			^{[a]}^{[b]}
May 21, 2179	00:05:15	114	Penumbral	−1.3346	0.3956	−0.5778	—		—						^{[a]}^{[b]}
June 19, 2179	09:12:16	152	Penumbral	1.2701	0.5250	−0.4703	—		—						^{[a]}^{[b]}
November 14, 2179	11:24:10	119	Penumbral	1.3504	0.4249	−0.6641	—		—						^{[a]}^{[b]}
May 9, 2180	16:02:03	124	Partial	−0.5840	1.7599	0.8124	2:54	—	14:35	—		17:29			^{[a]}^{[b]}
November 2, 2180	10:51:51	129	Partial	0.6669	1.6803	0.5891	2:53	—	09:25	—		12:18			^{[a]}^{[b]}
April 29, 2181	08:36:10	134	Total	0.1345	2.5938	1.6281	3:32	1:36	06:50	07:48	09:24	10:22			^{[a]}^{[b]}
October 22, 2181	13:31:23	139	Total	−0.0652	2.7613	1.7157	3:46	1:42	11:38	12:40	14:22	15:25			^{[a]}^{[b]}
April 18, 2182	21:10:16	144	Partial	0.9049	1.2068	0.1883	1:38	—	20:21	—		21:59			^{[a]}^{[b]}
October 11, 2182	23:34:06	149	Partial	−0.7776	1.4246	0.4376	2:19	—	22:24	—		00:44			^{[a]}^{[b]}
March 9, 2183	09:20:15	116	Penumbral	−1.2592	0.5953	−0.4997	—		—						^{[a]}^{[b]}
September 2, 2183	07:11:19	121	Penumbral	1.1036	0.8072	−0.1419	—		—						^{[a]}^{[b]}
October 1, 2183	15:01:25	159	Penumbral	−1.4396	0.1933	−0.7610	—		—						^{[a]}^{[b]}
February 26, 2184	09:01:33	126	Partial	−0.5579	1.8762	0.7930	3:12	—	07:26	—		10:38			^{[a]}^{[b]}
August 21, 2184	22:34:32	131	Total	0.3977	2.1190	1.1374	3:21	0:55	20:54	22:07	23:02	00:15			^{[a]}^{[b]}
February 14, 2185	13:59:37	136	Total	0.1660	2.5697	1.5372	3:39	1:35	12:10	13:12	14:47	15:49			^{[a]}^{[b]}
August 11, 2185	08:16:55	141	Total	−0.3774	2.1828	1.1482	3:32	0:59	06:31	07:47	08:47	10:03			^{[a]}^{[b]}
February 4, 2186	01:57:10	146	Partial	0.8402	1.3080	0.3244	2:00	—	00:57	—		02:57			^{[a]}^{[b]}
July 31, 2186	11:03:08	151	Penumbral	−1.1629	0.7589	−0.3102	—		—						^{[a]}^{[b]}
December 26, 2186	06:42:19	118	Penumbral	−1.2018	0.6443	−0.3389	—		—						^{[a]}^{[b]}
January 24, 2187	17:31:13	156	Penumbral	1.4758	0.1353	−0.8356	—		—						^{[a]}^{[b]}
June 20, 2187	22:40:05	123	Partial	0.8928	1.2372	0.2025	1:45	—	21:48	—		23:32			^{[a]}^{[b]}
December 15, 2187	18:54:28	128	Partial	−0.5595	1.8473	0.8156	3:04	—	17:22	—		20:27			^{[a]}^{[b]}
June 9, 2188	08:08:41	133	Total	0.0887	2.6856	1.7045	3:38	1:40	06:20	07:19	08:59	09:58			^{[a]}^{[b]}
December 4, 2188	00:11:29	138	Total	0.1394	2.6448	1.5602	3:50	1:39	22:17	23:22	01:01	02:06			^{[a]}^{[b]}
May 29, 2189	23:29:50	143	Partial	−0.6505	1.6375	0.6909	2:44	—	22:08	—		00:52			^{[a]}^{[b]}
November 22, 2189	23:49:55	148	Partial	0.8349	1.3765	0.2764	2:05	—	22:47	—		00:52			^{[a]}^{[b]}
April 20, 2190	07:59:11	115	Penumbral	1.2034	0.6397	−0.3402	—		—						^{[a]}^{[b]}
May 19, 2190	16:31:12	153	Penumbral	−1.3714	0.3183	−0.6357	—		—						^{[a]}^{[b]}
October 13, 2190	10:39:43	120	Penumbral	−1.3479	0.3979	−0.6285	—		—						^{[a]}^{[b]}
November 12, 2190	00:56:37	158	Penumbral	1.4894	0.1572	−0.9067	—		—						^{[a]}^{[b]}
April 9, 2191	18:37:47	125	Partial	0.5107	1.9399	0.9022	3:15	—	17:00	—		20:15			^{[a]}^{[b]}
October 2, 2191	22:41:32	130	Partial	−0.5729	1.7925	0.8206	2:57	—	21:13	—		00:10			^{[a]}^{[b]}
March 28, 2192	21:52:08	135	Total	−0.2202	2.4966	1.4120	3:49	1:32	19:58	21:06	22:38	23:47			^{[a]}^{[b]}
September 21, 2192	14:57:59	140	Total	0.1453	2.5668	1.6154	3:29	1:34	13:13	14:11	15:45	16:43			^{[a]}^{[b]}
March 17, 2193	21:30:14	145	Partial	−0.9274	1.1995	0.1138	1:22	—	20:49	—		22:11			^{[a]}^{[b]}
September 11, 2193	06:52:41	150	Partial	0.8828	1.2256	0.2505	1:48	—	05:59	—		07:47			^{[a]}^{[b]}
February 5, 2194	11:30:38	117	Penumbral	1.2338	0.6027	−0.4146	—		—						^{[a]}^{[b]}
August 2, 2194	05:14:22	122	Penumbral	−1.0539	0.9479	−0.0993	—		—						^{[a]}^{[b]}
January 26, 2195	00:54:28	127	Partial	0.5139	1.9028	0.9269	3:03	—	23:23	—		02:26			^{[a]}^{[b]}
July 22, 2195	06:44:48	132	Total	−0.3086	2.3271	1.2569	3:45	1:17	04:52	06:06	07:24	08:37			^{[a]}^{[b]}
January 15, 2196	16:37:32	137	Total	−0.1537	2.5641	1.5877	3:29	1:33	14:53	15:51	17:24	18:22			^{[a]}^{[b]}
July 10, 2196	08:21:41	142	Partial	0.4577	2.0407	0.9960	3:26	—	06:39	—		10:05			^{[a]}^{[b]}
January 4, 2197	05:59:39	147	Partial	−0.8601	1.2894	0.2703	1:54	—	05:03	—		06:57			^{[a]}^{[b]}
May 31, 2197	07:31:38	114	Penumbral	−1.3954	0.2817	−0.6871	—		—						^{[a]}^{[b]}
June 29, 2197	16:18:26	152	Penumbral	1.1911	0.6680	−0.3233	—		—						^{[a]}^{[b]}
November 24, 2197	19:12:50	119	Penumbral	1.3722	0.3870	−0.7061	—		—						^{[a]}^{[b]}
May 20, 2198	23:46:05	124	Partial	−0.6436	1.6493	0.7041	2:45	—	22:24	—		01:08			^{[a]}^{[b]}
November 13, 2198	18:29:59	129	Partial	0.6944	1.6306	0.5378	2:47	—	17:07	—		19:53			^{[a]}^{[b]}
May 10, 2199	16:20:53	134	Total	0.0793	2.6951	1.7297	3:34	1:39	14:34	15:31	17:10	18:08			^{[a]}^{[b]}
November 2, 2199	21:22:41	139	Total	−0.0340	2.8187	1.7731	3:46	1:43	19:30	20:31	22:14	23:16			^{[a]}^{[b]}
April 30, 2200	04:40:03	144	Partial	0.8550	1.2987	0.2797	1:59	—	03:41	—		05:39			^{[a]}^{[b]}
October 23, 2200	07:40:12	149	Partial	−0.7411	1.4917	0.5044	2:28	—	06:26	—		08:54			^{[a]}^{[b]}

== See also ==
- Lists of lunar eclipses
- Lunar eclipses by century
- List of lunar eclipses in the 19th century
- List of lunar eclipses in the 20th century
- List of lunar eclipses in the 21st century
