= List of lunar eclipses in the 19th century =

During the 19th century, there were 249 lunar eclipses of which 90 were penumbral, 97 were partial and 62 were total. Of the total eclipses, 51 were central, in the sense that the Moon passed through the very center (axis) of the Earth's shadow (for more information see gamma). In the 19th century, the greatest number of eclipses in one year was five, in 1879, though the years 1803, 1806, 1810, 1814, 1821, 1828, 1832, 1839, 1843, 1846, 1850, 1861, 1868, 1886, 1890, and 1897 had four eclipses each. One month, May 1817, featured two lunar eclipses, on May 1 and May 30. The predictions given here are by Fred Espenak of NASA's Goddard Space Flight Center.

The longest measured duration in which the Earth completely covered the Moon, known as totality, was during the lunar eclipse of August 13, 1859. This total lunar eclipse had a maximum duration of 1 hour, 46 minutes, and 27 seconds. The longest possible duration of a total lunar eclipse is 1 hour and 47 minutes.^{[a]}

The table contains the date and time of the greatest eclipse (in dynamical time, which in this case is the time when the axis of the Earth's shadow passes over the Moon; this is in (Ephemeris Time). The number of the saros series that the eclipse belongs to is given, followed by the type of the eclipse (either total, partial or penumbral), the gamma of the eclipse (how centrally the Moon passed through the Earth's shadow), and both the penumbral and umbral magnitude of the eclipse (the fraction of the Moon's diameter obscured by the Earth). For each eclipse, the duration of the eclipse is given, as well as the eclipse's contacts (the points at which the Moon reaches and exits the Earth's penumbra and umbra).

Eclipses are listed in sets by lunar years, repeating every 12 months for each node. Ascending node eclipses are given a red background highlight, and descending node eclipses are given a blue background highlight.

== Eclipses ==
| Date | Time of greatest eclipse (Terrestrial Time) | Saros | Type | Gamma | Magnitude | | Duration (hr:min) | | Contacts (UTC) (hr:min) | | | | Chart | Visibility | Ref(s) |
| Date | Time of greatest eclipse (Terrestrial Time) | Saros | Type | Gamma | Pen. | Umb. | Par. | Tot. | U1 | U2 | U3 | U4 | Chart | Visibility | Ref(s) |
|---|---|---|---|---|---|---|---|---|---|---|---|---|---|---|---|
| March 30, 1801 | 05:23:52 | 119 | Total | 0.0052 | 2.8569 | 1.8400 | 3:42 | 1:42 | 03:33 | 04:33 | 06:15 | 07:15 | | | ^{[a]}^{[b]} |
| September 22, 1801 | 07:18:42 | 124 | Total | −0.1074 | 2.6548 | 1.6660 | 3:36 | 1:38 | 05:30 | 06:30 | 08:08 | 09:07 | | | ^{[a]}^{[b]} |
| March 19, 1802 | 11:15:15 | 129 | Partial | −0.7517 | 1.5156 | 0.4422 | 2:32 | — | 09:59 | — | | 12:31 | | | ^{[a]}^{[b]} |
| September 11, 1802 | 22:36:33 | 134 | Partial | 0.6105 | 1.7134 | 0.7615 | 2:50 | — | 21:12 | — | | 00:02 | | | ^{[a]}^{[b]} |
| February 6, 1803 | 17:10:31 | 101 | Penumbral | 1.5322 | 0.0918 | −0.9980 | — | | — | | | | | | ^{[a]}^{[b]} |
| March 8, 1803 | 11:17:25 | 139 | Penumbral | −1.4653 | 0.2167 | −0.8776 | — | | — | | | | | | ^{[a]}^{[b]} |
| August 3, 1803 | 07:04:58 | 106 | Penumbral | −1.2349 | 0.5790 | −0.3953 | — | | — | | | | | | ^{[a]}^{[b]} |
| September 1, 1803 | 15:18:56 | 144 | Penumbral | 1.3282 | 0.4003 | −0.5589 | — | | — | | | | | | ^{[a]}^{[b]} |
| January 26, 1804 | 21:21:09 | 111 | Partial | 0.7882 | 1.4319 | 0.3918 | 2:18 | — | 20:12 | — | | 22:30 | | | ^{[a]}^{[b]} |
| July 22, 1804 | 17:37:48 | 116 | Partial | −0.5141 | 1.9284 | 0.9011 | 3:16 | — | 16:00 | — | | 19:16 | | | ^{[a]}^{[b]} |
| January 15, 1805 | 08:40:45 | 121 | Total | 0.0663 | 2.7305 | 1.7420 | 3:33 | 1:38 | 06:54 | 07:52 | 09:30 | 10:27 | | | ^{[a]}^{[b]} |
| July 11, 1805 | 21:04:40 | 126 | Total | 0.2561 | 2.4214 | 1.3554 | 3:48 | 1:28 | 19:11 | 20:21 | 21:48 | 22:58 | | | ^{[a]}^{[b]} |
| January 5, 1806 | 00:01:51 | 131 | Partial | −0.5981 | 1.7459 | 0.7748 | 2:51 | — | 22:37 | — | | 01:27 | | | ^{[a]}^{[b]} |
| June 30, 1806 | 21:44:26 | 136 | Penumbral | 1.0115 | 1.0320 | −0.0276 | — | | — | | | | | | ^{[a]}^{[b]} |
| November 26, 1806 | 02:05:25 | 103 | Penumbral | 1.4853 | 0.1450 | −0.8797 | — | | — | | | | | | ^{[a]}^{[b]} |
| December 25, 1806 | 14:47:51 | 141 | Penumbral | −1.2891 | 0.4923 | −0.5071 | — | | — | | | | | | ^{[a]}^{[b]} |
| May 21, 1807 | 16:49:20 | 108 | Partial | −0.9423 | 1.1229 | 0.1346 | 1:22 | — | 16:08 | — | | 17:30 | | | ^{[a]}^{[b]} |
| November 15, 1807 | 08:09:46 | 113 | Partial | 0.8473 | 1.3426 | 0.2646 | 2:00 | — | 07:10 | — | | 09:10 | | | ^{[a]}^{[b]} |
| May 10, 1808 | 07:38:04 | 118 | Total | −0.1736 | 2.5145 | 1.5637 | 3:29 | 1:33 | 05:53 | 06:52 | 08:24 | 09:23 | | | ^{[a]}^{[b]} |
| November 3, 1808 | 08:13:26 | 123 | Total | 0.1607 | 2.6121 | 1.5148 | 3:52 | 1:38 | 06:17 | 07:24 | 09:02 | 10:10 | | | ^{[a]}^{[b]} |
| April 30, 1809 | 00:32:50 | 128 | Partial | 0.5490 | 1.8275 | 0.8733 | 2:59 | — | 23:03 | — | | 02:03 | | | ^{[a]}^{[b]} |
| October 23, 1809 | 09:02:34 | 133 | Partial | −0.5440 | 1.8924 | 0.8275 | 3:13 | — | 07:26 | — | | 10:39 | | | ^{[a]}^{[b]} |
| March 21, 1810 | 02:54:35 | 100 | Penumbral | −1.4209 | 0.2689 | −0.7674 | — | | — | | | | | | ^{[a]}^{[b]} |
| April 19, 1810 | 14:53:54 | 138 | Penumbral | 1.3165 | 0.4414 | −0.5570 | — | | — | | | | | | ^{[a]}^{[b]} |
| September 13, 1810 | 06:26:57 | 105 | Penumbral | 1.4299 | 0.2202 | −0.7520 | — | | — | | | | | | ^{[a]}^{[b]} |
| October 12, 1810 | 16:39:09 | 143 | Penumbral | −1.2230 | 0.6167 | −0.3889 | — | | — | | | | | | ^{[a]}^{[b]} |
| March 10, 1811 | 06:37:27 | 110 | Partial | −0.7527 | 1.5205 | 0.4340 | 2:32 | — | 05:22 | — | | 07:53 | | | ^{[a]}^{[b]} |
| September 2, 1811 | 22:41:39 | 115 | Partial | 0.6972 | 1.5522 | 0.6045 | 2:35 | — | 21:24 | — | | 23:59 | | | ^{[a]}^{[b]} |
| February 27, 1812 | 06:04:39 | 120 | Total | −0.0538 | 2.8057 | 1.7135 | 3:54 | 1:44 | 04:08 | 05:12 | 06:57 | 08:02 | | | ^{[a]}^{[b]} |
| August 22, 1812 | 15:01:09 | 125 | Total | −0.0228 | 2.7998 | 1.8320 | 3:35 | 1:40 | 13:13 | 14:11 | 15:51 | 16:49 | | | ^{[a]}^{[b]} |
| February 15, 1813 | 08:50:33 | 130 | Partial | 0.6453 | 1.6993 | 0.6488 | 2:53 | — | 07:24 | — | | 10:17 | | | ^{[a]}^{[b]} |
| August 12, 1813 | 02:52:36 | 135 | Partial | −0.8085 | 1.3834 | 0.3655 | 2:15 | — | 01:45 | — | | 04:00 | | | ^{[a]}^{[b]} |
| January 6, 1814 | 07:28:07 | 102 | Penumbral | −1.4118 | 0.2568 | −0.7223 | — | | — | | | | | | ^{[a]}^{[b]} |
| February 4, 1814 | 18:46:49 | 140 | Penumbral | 1.2926 | 0.4843 | −0.5122 | — | | — | | | | | | ^{[a]}^{[b]} |
| July 2, 1814 | 16:51:18 | 107 | Penumbral | 1.2225 | 0.6498 | −0.4196 | — | | — | | | | | | ^{[a]}^{[b]} |
| December 26, 1814 | 23:08:14 | 112 | Partial | −0.7564 | 1.4573 | 0.4825 | 2:22 | — | 21:57 | — | | 00:19 | | | ^{[a]}^{[b]} |
| June 21, 1815 | 18:06:20 | 117 | Total | 0.4498 | 2.0575 | 1.0081 | 3:27 | 0:15 | 16:23 | 17:59 | 18:14 | 19:50 | | | ^{[a]}^{[b]} |
| December 16, 1815 | 12:54:53 | 122 | Total | −0.0906 | 2.6987 | 1.6850 | 3:37 | 1:38 | 11:06 | 12:06 | 13:44 | 14:44 | | | ^{[a]}^{[b]} |
| June 10, 1816 | 01:14:13 | 127 | Total | −0.3368 | 2.2387 | 1.2410 | 3:30 | 1:11 | 23:29 | 00:39 | 01:50 | 02:59 | | | ^{[a]}^{[b]} |
| December 4, 1816 | 20:35:02 | 132 | Partial | 0.6319 | 1.7338 | 0.6636 | 2:57 | — | 19:07 | — | | 22:03 | | | ^{[a]}^{[b]} |
| May 1, 1817 | 07:43:51 | 99 | Penumbral | 1.4587 | 0.1554 | −0.7931 | — | | — | | | | | | ^{[a]}^{[b]} |
| May 30, 1817 | 15:07:17 | 137 | Penumbral | −1.0607 | 0.8880 | −0.0652 | — | | — | | | | | | ^{[a]}^{[b]} |
| November 23, 1817 | 21:26:44 | 142 | Penumbral | 1.3435 | 0.4441 | −0.6577 | — | | — | | | | | | ^{[a]}^{[b]} |
| April 21, 1818 | 00:20:18 | 109 | Partial | 0.7728 | 1.4222 | 0.4572 | 2:20 | — | 23:10 | — | | 01:30 | | | ^{[a]}^{[b]} |
| October 14, 1818 | 05:25:15 | 114 | Partial | −0.9175 | 1.1981 | 0.1512 | 1:30 | — | 04:40 | — | | 06:10 | | | ^{[a]}^{[b]} |
| April 10, 1819 | 13:07:41 | 119 | Total | 0.0502 | 2.7745 | 1.7574 | 3:43 | 1:42 | 11:16 | 12:17 | 13:59 | 14:59 | | | ^{[a]}^{[b]} |
| October 3, 1819 | 15:13:16 | 124 | Total | −0.1510 | 2.5747 | 1.5868 | 3:35 | 1:35 | 13:26 | 14:26 | 16:01 | 17:01 | | | ^{[a]}^{[b]} |
| March 29, 1820 | 18:42:31 | 129 | Partial | −0.7112 | 1.5895 | 0.5171 | 2:42 | — | 17:21 | — | | 20:04 | | | ^{[a]}^{[b]} |
| September 22, 1820 | 06:34:58 | 134 | Partial | 0.5612 | 1.8049 | 0.8511 | 2:57 | — | 05:07 | — | | 08:03 | | | ^{[a]}^{[b]} |
| February 17, 1821 | 01:05:08 | 101 | Penumbral | 1.5470 | 0.0626 | −1.0230 | — | | — | | | | | | ^{[a]}^{[b]} |
| March 18, 1821 | 18:44:45 | 139 | Penumbral | −1.4293 | 0.2810 | −0.8095 | — | | — | | | | | | ^{[a]}^{[b]} |
| August 13, 1821 | 14:26:33 | 106 | Penumbral | −1.3066 | 0.4497 | −0.5292 | — | | — | | | | | | ^{[a]}^{[b]} |
| September 11, 1821 | 23:04:43 | 144 | Penumbral | 1.2766 | 0.4971 | −0.4666 | — | | — | | | | | | ^{[a]}^{[b]} |
| February 6, 1822 | 05:43:15 | 111 | Partial | 0.7961 | 1.4151 | 0.3797 | 2:16 | — | 04:35 | — | | 06:51 | | | ^{[a]}^{[b]} |
| August 3, 1822 | 00:29:56 | 116 | Partial | −0.5938 | 1.7845 | 0.7526 | 3:04 | — | 22:58 | — | | 02:02 | | | ^{[a]}^{[b]} |
| January 26, 1823 | 17:24:43 | 121 | Total | 0.0729 | 2.7169 | 1.7314 | 3:33 | 1:38 | 15:38 | 16:36 | 18:14 | 19:11 | | | ^{[a]}^{[b]} |
| July 23, 1823 | 03:33:13 | 126 | Total | 0.1699 | 2.5805 | 1.5124 | 3:52 | 1:39 | 01:36 | 02:43 | 04:22 | 05:28 | | | ^{[a]}^{[b]} |
| January 16, 1824 | 08:53:58 | 131 | Partial | −0.5937 | 1.7538 | 0.7829 | 2:51 | — | 07:28 | — | | 10:20 | | | ^{[a]}^{[b]} |
| July 11, 1824 | 04:14:49 | 136 | Partial | 0.9245 | 1.1900 | 0.1330 | 1:28 | — | 03:31 | — | | 04:59 | | | ^{[a]}^{[b]} |
| December 6, 1824 | 10:32:30 | 103 | Penumbral | 1.4980 | 0.1241 | −0.9053 | — | | — | | | | | | ^{[a]}^{[b]} |
| January 4, 1825 | 23:31:42 | 141 | Penumbral | −1.2890 | 0.4937 | −0.5081 | — | | — | | | | | | ^{[a]}^{[b]} |
| June 1, 1825 | 00:06:08 | 108 | Partial | −1.0089 | 0.9983 | 0.0149 | 0:28 | — | 23:52 | — | | 00:20 | | | ^{[a]}^{[b]} |
| November 25, 1825 | 16:09:16 | 113 | Partial | 0.8643 | 1.3137 | 0.2311 | 1:53 | — | 15:13 | — | | 17:06 | | | ^{[a]}^{[b]} |
| May 21, 1826 | 15:15:16 | 118 | Total | −0.2384 | 2.3941 | 1.4464 | 3:26 | 1:27 | 13:32 | 14:32 | 15:59 | 16:58 | | | ^{[a]}^{[b]} |
| November 14, 1826 | 15:56:05 | 123 | Total | 0.1840 | 2.5707 | 1.4709 | 3:51 | 1:36 | 14:00 | 15:08 | 16:44 | 17:52 | | | ^{[a]}^{[b]} |
| May 11, 1827 | 08:16:48 | 128 | Partial | 0.4910 | 1.9336 | 0.9801 | 3:07 | — | 06:43 | — | | 09:50 | | | ^{[a]}^{[b]} |
| November 3, 1827 | 16:51:47 | 133 | Partial | −0.5151 | 1.9457 | 0.8805 | 3:16 | — | 15:14 | — | | 18:30 | | | ^{[a]}^{[b]} |
| March 31, 1828 | 10:38:36 | 100 | Penumbral | −1.4630 | 0.1917 | −0.8446 | — | | — | | | | | | ^{[a]}^{[b]} |
| April 29, 1828 | 22:28:31 | 138 | Penumbral | 1.2674 | 0.5318 | −0.4671 | — | | — | | | | | | ^{[a]}^{[b]} |
| September 23, 1828 | 14:19:33 | 105 | Penumbral | 1.4724 | 0.1424 | −0.8302 | — | | — | | | | | | ^{[a]}^{[b]} |
| October 23, 1828 | 00:44:34 | 143 | Penumbral | −1.1889 | 0.6793 | −0.3263 | — | | — | | | | | | ^{[a]}^{[b]} |
| March 20, 1829 | 14:08:05 | 110 | Partial | −0.7891 | 1.4527 | 0.3680 | 2:22 | — | 12:57 | — | | 15:19 | | | ^{[a]}^{[b]} |
| September 13, 1829 | 06:33:19 | 115 | Partial | 0.7509 | 1.4550 | 0.5046 | 2:24 | — | 05:21 | — | | 07:45 | | | ^{[a]}^{[b]} |
| March 9, 1830 | 13:42:49 | 120 | Total | −0.0824 | 2.7510 | 1.6632 | 3:53 | 1:43 | 11:46 | 12:51 | 14:34 | 15:40 | | | ^{[a]}^{[b]} |
| September 2, 1830 | 22:37:48 | 125 | Total | 0.0371 | 2.7760 | 1.8034 | 3:36 | 1:40 | 20:50 | 21:48 | 23:28 | 00:26 | | | ^{[a]}^{[b]} |
| February 26, 1831 | 16:56:14 | 130 | Partial | 0.6246 | 1.7346 | 0.6897 | 2:56 | — | 15:28 | — | | 18:24 | | | ^{[a]}^{[b]} |
| August 23, 1831 | 09:59:50 | 135 | Partial | −0.7428 | 1.5067 | 0.4833 | 2:32 | — | 08:44 | — | | 11:16 | | | ^{[a]}^{[b]} |
| January 17, 1832 | 16:18:07 | 102 | Penumbral | −1.4135 | 0.2527 | −0.7245 | — | | — | | | | | | ^{[a]}^{[b]} |
| February 16, 1832 | 03:20:35 | 140 | Penumbral | 1.2783 | 0.5083 | −0.4838 | — | | — | | | | | | ^{[a]}^{[b]} |
| July 12, 1832 | 23:15:51 | 107 | Penumbral | 1.3081 | 0.4929 | −0.5769 | — | | — | | | | | | ^{[a]}^{[b]} |
| August 11, 1832 | 14:14:47 | 145 | Penumbral | −1.5396 | 0.0662 | −1.0000 | — | | — | | | | | | ^{[a]}^{[b]} |
| January 6, 1833 | 07:59:38 | 112 | Partial | −0.7611 | 1.4491 | 0.4733 | 2:21 | — | 06:49 | — | | 09:10 | | | ^{[a]}^{[b]} |
| July 2, 1833 | 00:43:16 | 117 | Partial | 0.5329 | 1.9036 | 0.8572 | 3:16 | — | 23:05 | — | | 02:21 | | | ^{[a]}^{[b]} |
| December 26, 1833 | 21:32:48 | 122 | Total | −0.0951 | 2.6920 | 1.6749 | 3:38 | 1:38 | 19:44 | 20:44 | 22:22 | 23:22 | | | ^{[a]}^{[b]} |
| June 21, 1834 | 08:19:39 | 127 | Total | −0.2583 | 2.3806 | 1.3871 | 3:34 | 1:26 | 06:33 | 07:37 | 09:02 | 10:07 | | | ^{[a]}^{[b]} |
| December 16, 1834 | 04:48:01 | 132 | Partial | 0.6249 | 1.7487 | 0.6746 | 2:58 | — | 03:19 | — | | 06:17 | | | ^{[a]}^{[b]} |
| May 12, 1835 | 15:28:38 | 99 | Penumbral | 1.5160 | 0.0489 | −0.8969 | — | | — | | | | | | ^{[a]}^{[b]} |
| June 10, 1835 | 22:35:47 | 137 | Partial | −0.9888 | 1.0184 | 0.0681 | 0:57 | — | 22:07 | — | | 23:04 | | | ^{[a]}^{[b]} |
| December 5, 1835 | 05:20:12 | 142 | Penumbral | 1.3290 | 0.4717 | −0.6322 | — | | — | | | | | | ^{[a]}^{[b]} |
| May 1, 1836 | 08:06:43 | 109 | Partial | 0.8299 | 1.3173 | 0.3528 | 2:05 | — | 07:04 | — | | 09:09 | | | ^{[a]}^{[b]} |
| October 24, 1836 | 13:14:37 | 114 | Partial | −0.9472 | 1.1435 | 0.0966 | 1:13 | — | 12:38 | — | | 13:51 | | | ^{[a]}^{[b]} |
| April 20, 1837 | 20:40:40 | 119 | Total | 0.1033 | 2.6772 | 1.6597 | 3:43 | 1:40 | 18:49 | 19:51 | 21:31 | 22:32 | | | ^{[a]}^{[b]} |
| October 13, 1837 | 23:17:01 | 124 | Total | −0.1878 | 2.5074 | 1.5192 | 3:33 | 1:32 | 21:31 | 22:31 | 00:03 | 01:03 | | | ^{[a]}^{[b]} |
| April 10, 1838 | 01:58:42 | 129 | Partial | −0.6622 | 1.6788 | 0.6076 | 2:54 | — | 00:32 | — | | 03:26 | | | ^{[a]}^{[b]} |
| October 3, 1838 | 14:41:22 | 134 | Partial | 0.5182 | 1.8849 | 0.9288 | 3:02 | — | 13:10 | — | | 16:12 | | | ^{[a]}^{[b]} |
| February 28, 1839 | 08:53:36 | 101 | Penumbral | 1.5671 | 0.0232 | −1.0576 | — | | — | | | | | | ^{[a]}^{[b]} |
| March 30, 1839 | 02:02:57 | 139 | Penumbral | −1.3853 | 0.3595 | −0.7269 | — | | — | | | | | | ^{[a]}^{[b]} |
| August 24, 1839 | 21:52:08 | 106 | Penumbral | −1.3743 | 0.3281 | −0.6560 | — | | — | | | | | | ^{[a]}^{[b]} |
| September 23, 1839 | 06:57:32 | 144 | Penumbral | 1.2311 | 0.5830 | −0.3855 | — | | — | | | | | | ^{[a]}^{[b]} |
| February 17, 1840 | 14:02:30 | 111 | Partial | 0.8074 | 1.3917 | 0.3615 | 2:12 | — | 12:56 | — | | 15:09 | | | ^{[a]}^{[b]} |
| August 13, 1840 | 07:23:03 | 116 | Partial | −0.6716 | 1.6443 | 0.6074 | 2:50 | — | 05:58 | — | | 08:48 | | | ^{[a]}^{[b]} |
| February 6, 1841 | 02:07:08 | 121 | Total | 0.0812 | 2.6999 | 1.7178 | 3:32 | 1:37 | 00:21 | 01:18 | 02:56 | 03:53 | | | ^{[a]}^{[b]} |
| August 2, 1841 | 10:00:46 | 126 | Total | 0.0846 | 2.7381 | 1.6678 | 3:55 | 1:45 | 08:03 | 09:08 | 10:53 | 11:58 | | | ^{[a]}^{[b]} |
| January 26, 1842 | 17:44:21 | 131 | Partial | −0.5884 | 1.7634 | 0.7930 | 2:52 | — | 16:18 | — | | 19:10 | | | ^{[a]}^{[b]} |
| July 22, 1842 | 10:47:33 | 136 | Partial | 0.8383 | 1.3480 | 0.2917 | 2:06 | — | 09:44 | — | | 11:51 | | | ^{[a]}^{[b]} |
| December 17, 1842 | 19:02:24 | 103 | Penumbral | 1.5078 | 0.1082 | −0.9253 | — | | — | | | | | | ^{[a]}^{[b]} |
| January 16, 1843 | 08:14:18 | 141 | Penumbral | −1.2885 | 0.4955 | −0.5083 | — | | — | | | | | | ^{[a]}^{[b]} |
| June 12, 1843 | 07:22:10 | 108 | Penumbral | −1.0767 | 0.8717 | −0.1073 | — | | — | | | | | | ^{[a]}^{[b]} |
| July 11, 1843 | 16:49:47 | 146 | Penumbral | 1.5468 | 0.0226 | −0.9831 | — | | — | | | | | | ^{[a]}^{[b]} |
| December 7, 1843 | 00:11:25 | 113 | Partial | 0.8785 | 1.2896 | 0.2031 | 1:47 | — | 23:18 | — | | 01:05 | | | ^{[a]}^{[b]} |
| May 31, 1844 | 22:50:37 | 118 | Total | −0.3050 | 2.2706 | 1.3255 | 3:22 | 1:17 | 21:09 | 22:12 | 23:29 | 00:32 | | | ^{[a]}^{[b]} |
| November 24, 1844 | 23:44:46 | 123 | Total | 0.2026 | 2.5375 | 1.4358 | 3:50 | 1:33 | 21:50 | 22:58 | 00:31 | 01:40 | | | ^{[a]}^{[b]} |
| May 21, 1845 | 15:54:24 | 128 | Total | 0.4281 | 2.0488 | 1.0957 | 3:14 | 0:45 | 14:18 | 15:32 | 16:17 | 17:31 | | | ^{[a]}^{[b]} |
| November 14, 1845 | 00:49:36 | 133 | Partial | −0.4924 | 1.9872 | 0.9221 | 3:19 | — | 23:10 | — | | 02:29 | | | ^{[a]}^{[b]} |
| April 11, 1846 | 18:11:28 | 100 | Penumbral | −1.5131 | 0.0998 | −0.9366 | — | | — | | | | | | ^{[a]}^{[b]} |
| May 11, 1846 | 05:53:37 | 138 | Penumbral | 1.2111 | 0.6355 | −0.3642 | — | | — | | | | | | ^{[a]}^{[b]} |
| October 4, 1846 | 22:21:31 | 105 | Penumbral | 1.5077 | 0.0779 | −0.8954 | — | | — | | | | | | ^{[a]}^{[b]} |
| November 3, 1846 | 08:59:17 | 143 | Penumbral | −1.1618 | 0.7287 | −0.2766 | — | | — | | | | | | ^{[a]}^{[b]} |
| March 31, 1847 | 21:26:56 | 110 | Partial | −0.8345 | 1.3684 | 0.2856 | 2:06 | — | 20:24 | — | | 22:30 | | | ^{[a]}^{[b]} |
| September 24, 1847 | 14:33:37 | 115 | Partial | 0.7973 | 1.3714 | 0.4181 | 2:13 | — | 13:27 | — | | 15:40 | | | ^{[a]}^{[b]} |
| March 19, 1848 | 21:12:05 | 120 | Total | −0.1186 | 2.6823 | 1.5993 | 3:52 | 1:41 | 19:16 | 20:21 | 22:03 | 23:08 | | | ^{[a]}^{[b]} |
| September 13, 1848 | 06:19:18 | 125 | Total | 0.0922 | 2.6776 | 1.6997 | 3:35 | 1:39 | 04:32 | 05:30 | 07:09 | 08:07 | | | ^{[a]}^{[b]} |
| March 9, 1849 | 00:55:42 | 130 | Partial | 0.5980 | 1.7804 | 0.7414 | 3:01 | — | 23:25 | — | | 02:26 | | | ^{[a]}^{[b]} |
| September 2, 1849 | 17:10:11 | 135 | Partial | −0.6806 | 1.6238 | 0.5945 | 2:47 | — | 15:47 | — | | 18:34 | | | ^{[a]}^{[b]} |
| January 28, 1850 | 01:05:58 | 102 | Penumbral | −1.4175 | 0.2442 | −0.7305 | — | | — | | | | | | ^{[a]}^{[b]} |
| February 26, 1850 | 11:48:05 | 140 | Penumbral | 1.2587 | 0.5420 | −0.4453 | — | | — | | | | | | ^{[a]}^{[b]} |
| July 24, 1850 | 05:40:08 | 107 | Penumbral | 1.3933 | 0.3371 | −0.7337 | — | | — | | | | | | ^{[a]}^{[b]} |
| August 22, 1850 | 20:54:54 | 145 | Penumbral | −1.4679 | 0.1997 | −0.8704 | — | | — | | | | | | ^{[a]}^{[b]} |
| January 17, 1851 | 16:50:39 | 112 | Partial | −0.7660 | 1.4406 | 0.4642 | 2:20 | — | 15:41 | — | | 18:00 | | | ^{[a]}^{[b]} |
| July 13, 1851 | 07:21:34 | 117 | Partial | 0.6154 | 1.7508 | 0.7069 | 3:02 | — | 05:50 | — | | 08:53 | | | ^{[a]}^{[b]} |
| January 7, 1852 | 06:10:36 | 122 | Total | −0.0991 | 2.6863 | 1.6663 | 3:38 | 1:38 | 04:21 | 05:21 | 07:00 | 08:00 | | | ^{[a]}^{[b]} |
| July 1, 1852 | 15:26:05 | 127 | Total | −0.1799 | 2.5227 | 1.5330 | 3:37 | 1:35 | 13:37 | 14:39 | 16:13 | 17:15 | | | ^{[a]}^{[b]} |
| December 26, 1852 | 13:02:59 | 132 | Partial | 0.6203 | 1.7588 | 0.6815 | 2:59 | — | 11:33 | — | | 14:33 | | | ^{[a]}^{[b]} |
| June 21, 1853 | 06:01:41 | 137 | Partial | −0.9146 | 1.1535 | 0.2056 | 1:37 | — | 05:13 | — | | 06:50 | | | ^{[a]}^{[b]} |
| December 15, 1853 | 13:18:35 | 142 | Penumbral | 1.3186 | 0.4917 | −0.6138 | — | | — | | | | | | ^{[a]}^{[b]} |
| May 12, 1854 | 15:46:02 | 109 | Partial | 0.8919 | 1.2035 | 0.2389 | 1:45 | — | 14:54 | — | | 16:39 | | | ^{[a]}^{[b]} |
| November 4, 1854 | 21:12:41 | 114 | Partial | −0.9707 | 1.1004 | 0.0537 | 0:54 | — | 20:45 | — | | 21:40 | | | ^{[a]}^{[b]} |
| May 2, 1855 | 04:05:16 | 119 | Total | 0.1625 | 2.5690 | 1.5509 | 3:42 | 1:37 | 02:15 | 03:17 | 04:54 | 05:56 | | | ^{[a]}^{[b]} |
| October 25, 1855 | 07:29:33 | 124 | Total | −0.2177 | 2.4527 | 1.4643 | 3:31 | 1:29 | 05:44 | 06:45 | 08:14 | 09:15 | | | ^{[a]}^{[b]} |
| April 20, 1856 | 09:06:39 | 129 | Partial | −0.6068 | 1.7799 | 0.7098 | 3:05 | — | 07:34 | — | | 10:39 | | | ^{[a]}^{[b]} |
| October 13, 1856 | 22:54:26 | 134 | Partial | 0.4809 | 1.9545 | 0.9960 | 3:06 | — | 21:21 | — | | 00:28 | | | ^{[a]}^{[b]} |
| April 9, 1857 | 09:13:10 | 139 | Penumbral | −1.3347 | 0.4503 | −0.6318 | — | | — | | | | | | ^{[a]}^{[b]} |
| September 4, 1857 | 05:22:09 | 106 | Penumbral | −1.4376 | 0.2148 | −0.7748 | — | | — | | | | | | ^{[a]}^{[b]} |
| October 3, 1857 | 14:56:49 | 144 | Penumbral | 1.1914 | 0.6585 | −0.3150 | — | | — | | | | | | ^{[a]}^{[b]} |
| February 27, 1858 | 22:14:13 | 111 | Partial | 0.8252 | 1.3561 | 0.3316 | 2:07 | — | 21:11 | — | | 23:18 | | | ^{[a]}^{[b]} |
| August 24, 1858 | 14:20:39 | 116 | Partial | −0.7446 | 1.5130 | 0.4707 | 2:33 | — | 13:04 | — | | 15:37 | | | ^{[a]}^{[b]} |
| February 17, 1859 | 10:43:21 | 121 | Total | 0.0950 | 2.6727 | 1.6944 | 3:32 | 1:37 | 08:57 | 09:55 | 11:32 | 12:29 | | | ^{[a]}^{[b]} |
| August 13, 1859 | 16:34:18 | 126 | Total | 0.0038 | 2.8877 | 1.8148 | 3:56 | 1:46 | 14:36 | 15:41 | 17:28 | 18:32 | | | ^{[a]}^{[b]} |
| February 7, 1860 | 02:29:37 | 131 | Partial | −0.5790 | 1.7801 | 0.8106 | 2:54 | — | 01:03 | — | | 03:56 | | | ^{[a]}^{[b]} |
| August 1, 1860 | 17:24:54 | 136 | Partial | 0.7551 | 1.5003 | 0.4450 | 2:32 | — | 16:09 | — | | 18:41 | | | ^{[a]}^{[b]} |
| December 28, 1860 | 03:33:47 | 103 | Penumbral | 1.5159 | 0.0950 | −0.9419 | — | | — | | | | | | ^{[a]}^{[b]} |
| January 26, 1861 | 16:53:54 | 141 | Penumbral | −1.2864 | 0.5002 | −0.5052 | — | | — | | | | | | ^{[a]}^{[b]} |
| June 22, 1861 | 14:36:07 | 108 | Penumbral | −1.1476 | 0.7397 | −0.2355 | — | | — | | | | | | ^{[a]}^{[b]} |
| July 21, 1861 | 23:50:29 | 146 | Penumbral | 1.4659 | 0.1695 | −0.8334 | — | | — | | | | | | ^{[a]}^{[b]} |
| December 17, 1861 | 08:18:35 | 113 | Partial | 0.8880 | 1.2738 | 0.1840 | 1:42 | — | 07:28 | — | | 09:10 | | | ^{[a]}^{[b]} |
| June 12, 1862 | 06:20:56 | 118 | Total | −0.3763 | 2.1387 | 1.1957 | 3:17 | 1:02 | 04:42 | 05:50 | 06:52 | 08:00 | | | ^{[a]}^{[b]} |
| December 6, 1862 | 07:40:14 | 123 | Total | 0.2157 | 2.5141 | 1.4112 | 3:49 | 1:31 | 05:46 | 06:54 | 08:26 | 09:35 | | | ^{[a]}^{[b]} |
| June 1, 1863 | 23:26:07 | 128 | Total | 0.3605 | 2.1729 | 1.2195 | 3:20 | 1:06 | 21:46 | 22:53 | 23:59 | 01:06 | | | ^{[a]}^{[b]} |
| November 25, 1863 | 08:56:04 | 133 | Partial | −0.4760 | 2.0170 | 0.9525 | 3:20 | — | 07:16 | — | | 10:36 | | | ^{[a]}^{[b]} |
| May 21, 1864 | 13:11:56 | 138 | Penumbral | 1.1502 | 0.7480 | −0.2531 | — | | — | | | | | | ^{[a]}^{[b]} |
| October 15, 1864 | 06:30:39 | 105 | Penumbral | 1.5379 | 0.0228 | −0.9512 | — | | — | | | | | | ^{[a]}^{[b]} |
| November 13, 1864 | 17:21:19 | 143 | Penumbral | −1.1402 | 0.7683 | −0.2367 | — | | — | | | | | | ^{[a]}^{[b]} |
| April 11, 1865 | 04:38:04 | 110 | Partial | −0.8856 | 1.2736 | 0.1929 | 1:45 | — | 03:45 | — | | 05:31 | | | ^{[a]}^{[b]} |
| October 4, 1865 | 22:39:55 | 115 | Partial | 0.8386 | 1.2973 | 0.3408 | 2:01 | — | 21:39 | — | | 23:41 | | | ^{[a]}^{[b]} |
| March 31, 1866 | 04:33:31 | 120 | Total | −0.1614 | 2.6011 | 1.5232 | 3:51 | 1:38 | 02:38 | 03:44 | 05:23 | 06:29 | | | ^{[a]}^{[b]} |
| September 24, 1866 | 14:07:10 | 125 | Total | 0.1412 | 2.5904 | 1.6071 | 3:35 | 1:36 | 12:20 | 13:19 | 14:55 | 15:54 | | | ^{[a]}^{[b]} |
| March 20, 1867 | 08:48:57 | 130 | Partial | 0.5656 | 1.8366 | 0.8038 | 3:06 | — | 07:16 | — | | 10:22 | | | ^{[a]}^{[b]} |
| September 14, 1867 | 00:26:24 | 135 | Partial | −0.6239 | 1.7309 | 0.6956 | 2:58 | — | 22:58 | — | | 01:55 | | | ^{[a]}^{[b]} |
| February 8, 1868 | 09:49:36 | 102 | Penumbral | −1.4252 | 0.2288 | −0.7433 | — | | — | | | | | | ^{[a]}^{[b]} |
| March 8, 1868 | 20:09:46 | 140 | Penumbral | 1.2339 | 0.5850 | −0.3975 | — | | — | | | | | | ^{[a]}^{[b]} |
| August 3, 1868 | 12:09:10 | 107 | Penumbral | 1.4740 | 0.1894 | −0.8825 | — | | — | | | | | | ^{[a]}^{[b]} |
| September 2, 1868 | 03:41:26 | 145 | Penumbral | −1.4012 | 0.3242 | −0.7499 | — | | — | | | | | | ^{[a]}^{[b]} |
| January 28, 1869 | 01:38:25 | 112 | Partial | −0.7733 | 1.4272 | 0.4507 | 2:18 | — | 00:29 | — | | 02:47 | | | ^{[a]}^{[b]} |
| July 23, 1869 | 14:02:44 | 117 | Partial | 0.6961 | 1.6017 | 0.5599 | 2:46 | — | 12:40 | — | | 15:26 | | | ^{[a]}^{[b]} |
| January 17, 1870 | 14:46:33 | 122 | Total | −0.1037 | 2.6789 | 1.6566 | 3:39 | 1:38 | 12:57 | 13:57 | 15:36 | 16:36 | | | ^{[a]}^{[b]} |
| July 12, 1870 | 22:34:23 | 127 | Total | −0.1023 | 2.6636 | 1.6769 | 3:39 | 1:40 | 20:45 | 21:45 | 23:24 | 00:24 | | | ^{[a]}^{[b]} |
| January 6, 1871 | 21:16:40 | 132 | Partial | 0.6154 | 1.7690 | 0.6893 | 3:01 | — | 19:46 | — | | 22:47 | | | ^{[a]}^{[b]} |
| July 2, 1871 | 13:27:48 | 137 | Partial | −0.8401 | 1.2893 | 0.3432 | 2:02 | — | 12:27 | — | | 14:29 | | | ^{[a]}^{[b]} |
| December 26, 1871 | 21:19:33 | 142 | Penumbral | 1.3105 | 0.5068 | −0.5995 | — | | — | | | | | | ^{[a]}^{[b]} |
| May 22, 1872 | 23:18:25 | 109 | Partial | 0.9592 | 1.0801 | 0.1151 | 1:14 | — | 22:41 | — | | 23:56 | | | ^{[a]}^{[b]} |
| November 15, 1872 | 05:19:39 | 114 | Partial | −0.9876 | 1.0691 | 0.0229 | 0:36 | — | 05:02 | — | | 05:37 | | | ^{[a]}^{[b]} |
| May 12, 1873 | 11:20:28 | 119 | Total | 0.2284 | 2.4484 | 1.4294 | 3:39 | 1:30 | 09:31 | 10:36 | 12:05 | 13:10 | | | ^{[a]}^{[b]} |
| November 4, 1873 | 15:51:05 | 124 | Total | −0.2408 | 2.4104 | 1.4217 | 3:29 | 1:26 | 14:07 | 15:08 | 16:34 | 17:36 | | | ^{[a]}^{[b]} |
| May 1, 1874 | 16:03:20 | 129 | Partial | −0.5426 | 1.8971 | 0.8282 | 3:16 | — | 14:25 | — | | 17:41 | | | ^{[a]}^{[b]} |
| October 25, 1874 | 07:16:25 | 134 | Total | 0.4510 | 2.0108 | 1.0497 | 3:09 | 0:33 | 05:42 | 07:00 | 07:33 | 08:51 | | | ^{[a]}^{[b]} |
| April 20, 1875 | 16:15:24 | 139 | Penumbral | −1.2770 | 0.5540 | −0.5238 | — | | — | | | | | | ^{[a]}^{[b]} |
| September 15, 1875 | 12:57:33 | 106 | Penumbral | −1.4955 | 0.1115 | −0.8839 | — | | — | | | | | | ^{[a]}^{[b]} |
| October 14, 1875 | 23:02:58 | 144 | Penumbral | 1.1577 | 0.7228 | −0.2558 | — | | — | | | | | | ^{[a]}^{[b]} |
| March 10, 1876 | 06:21:35 | 111 | Partial | 0.8474 | 1.3124 | 0.2937 | 2:00 | — | 05:22 | — | | 07:21 | | | ^{[a]}^{[b]} |
| September 3, 1876 | 21:22:38 | 116 | Partial | −0.8130 | 1.3904 | 0.3425 | 2:14 | — | 20:16 | — | | 22:30 | | | ^{[a]}^{[b]} |
| February 27, 1877 | 19:15:42 | 121 | Total | 0.1125 | 2.6386 | 1.6644 | 3:31 | 1:36 | 17:30 | 18:28 | 20:04 | 21:01 | | | ^{[a]}^{[b]} |
| August 23, 1877 | 23:11:40 | 126 | Total | −0.0739 | 2.7606 | 1.6849 | 3:55 | 1:45 | 21:14 | 22:19 | 00:04 | 01:09 | | | ^{[a]}^{[b]} |
| February 17, 1878 | 11:11:10 | 131 | Partial | −0.5667 | 1.8021 | 0.8338 | 2:56 | — | 09:43 | — | | 12:39 | | | ^{[a]}^{[b]} |
| August 13, 1878 | 00:08:27 | 136 | Partial | 0.6756 | 1.6458 | 0.5912 | 2:51 | — | 22:43 | — | | 01:34 | | | ^{[a]}^{[b]} |
| January 8, 1879 | 12:04:16 | 103 | Penumbral | 1.5243 | 0.0812 | −0.9587 | — | | — | | | | | | ^{[a]}^{[b]} |
| February 7, 1879 | 01:28:38 | 141 | Penumbral | −1.2809 | 0.5108 | −0.4956 | — | | — | | | | | | ^{[a]}^{[b]} |
| July 3, 1879 | 21:50:34 | 108 | Penumbral | −1.2172 | 0.6103 | −0.3618 | — | | — | | | | | | ^{[a]}^{[b]} |
| August 2, 1879 | 06:57:48 | 146 | Penumbral | 1.3889 | 0.3098 | −0.6909 | — | | — | | | | | | ^{[a]}^{[b]} |
| December 28, 1879 | 16:26:27 | 113 | Partial | 0.8969 | 1.2587 | 0.1664 | 1:37 | — | 15:38 | — | | 17:15 | | | ^{[a]}^{[b]} |
| June 22, 1880 | 13:50:32 | 118 | Total | −0.4484 | 2.0057 | 1.0641 | 3:11 | 0:37 | 12:15 | 13:32 | 14:09 | 15:26 | | | ^{[a]}^{[b]} |
| December 16, 1880 | 15:39:08 | 123 | Total | 0.2263 | 2.4949 | 1.3914 | 3:49 | 1:30 | 13:45 | 14:54 | 16:24 | 17:33 | | | ^{[a]}^{[b]} |
| June 12, 1881 | 06:53:49 | 128 | Total | 0.2898 | 2.3031 | 1.3488 | 3:25 | 1:20 | 05:11 | 06:14 | 07:34 | 08:36 | | | ^{[a]}^{[b]} |
| December 5, 1881 | 17:08:38 | 133 | Partial | −0.4640 | 2.0386 | 0.9751 | 3:21 | — | 15:28 | — | | 18:49 | | | ^{[a]}^{[b]} |
| June 1, 1882 | 20:22:04 | 138 | Penumbral | 1.0832 | 0.8717 | −0.1311 | — | | — | | | | | | ^{[a]}^{[b]} |
| November 25, 1882 | 01:51:06 | 143 | Penumbral | −1.1243 | 0.7972 | −0.2071 | — | | — | | | | | | ^{[a]}^{[b]} |
| April 22, 1883 | 11:38:34 | 110 | Partial | −0.9448 | 1.1639 | 0.0853 | 1:11 | — | 11:03 | — | | 12:14 | | | ^{[a]}^{[b]} |
| October 16, 1883 | 06:54:20 | 115 | Partial | 0.8732 | 1.2355 | 0.2757 | 1:50 | — | 05:59 | — | | 07:49 | | | ^{[a]}^{[b]} |
| April 10, 1884 | 11:46:39 | 120 | Total | −0.2116 | 2.5064 | 1.4337 | 3:48 | 1:33 | 09:53 | 11:00 | 12:33 | 13:41 | | | ^{[a]}^{[b]} |
| October 4, 1884 | 22:02:00 | 125 | Total | 0.1839 | 2.5151 | 1.5260 | 3:34 | 1:33 | 20:15 | 21:16 | 22:48 | 23:49 | | | ^{[a]}^{[b]} |
| March 30, 1885 | 16:34:13 | 130 | Partial | 0.5257 | 1.9066 | 0.8802 | 3:11 | — | 14:59 | — | | 18:10 | | | ^{[a]}^{[b]} |
| September 24, 1885 | 07:48:18 | 135 | Partial | −0.5725 | 1.8284 | 0.7867 | 3:07 | — | 06:15 | — | | 09:22 | | | ^{[a]}^{[b]} |
| February 18, 1886 | 18:29:05 | 102 | Penumbral | −1.4365 | 0.2064 | −0.7627 | — | | — | | | | | | ^{[a]}^{[b]} |
| March 20, 1886 | 04:24:23 | 140 | Penumbral | 1.2029 | 0.6393 | −0.3381 | — | | — | | | | | | ^{[a]}^{[b]} |
| August 14, 1886 | 18:42:09 | 107 | Penumbral | 1.5511 | 0.0489 | −1.0246 | — | | — | | | | | | ^{[a]}^{[b]} |
| September 13, 1886 | 10:34:49 | 145 | Penumbral | −1.3398 | 0.4390 | −0.6392 | — | | — | | | | | | ^{[a]}^{[b]} |
| February 8, 1887 | 10:22:09 | 112 | Partial | −0.7836 | 1.4081 | 0.4317 | 2:16 | — | 09:14 | — | | 11:30 | | | ^{[a]}^{[b]} |
| August 3, 1887 | 20:48:59 | 117 | Partial | 0.7732 | 1.4595 | 0.4194 | 2:26 | — | 19:36 | — | | 22:02 | | | ^{[a]}^{[b]} |
| January 28, 1888 | 23:20:07 | 122 | Total | −0.1095 | 2.6692 | 1.6452 | 3:39 | 1:38 | 21:31 | 22:31 | 00:09 | 01:10 | | | ^{[a]}^{[b]} |
| July 23, 1888 | 05:44:53 | 127 | Total | −0.0256 | 2.8030 | 1.8189 | 3:40 | 1:42 | 03:55 | 04:54 | 06:36 | 07:35 | | | ^{[a]}^{[b]} |
| January 17, 1889 | 05:29:45 | 132 | Partial | 0.6106 | 1.7788 | 0.6972 | 3:02 | — | 03:59 | — | | 07:01 | | | ^{[a]}^{[b]} |
| July 12, 1889 | 20:53:58 | 137 | Partial | −0.7654 | 1.4257 | 0.4807 | 2:22 | — | 19:43 | — | | 22:05 | | | ^{[a]}^{[b]} |
| January 6, 1890 | 05:21:32 | 142 | Penumbral | 1.3029 | 0.5209 | −0.5854 | — | | — | | | | | | ^{[a]}^{[b]} |
| June 3, 1890 | 06:44:49 | 109 | Penumbral | 1.0309 | 0.9492 | −0.0168 | — | | — | | | | | | ^{[a]}^{[b]} |
| July 2, 1890 | 14:08:42 | 147 | Penumbral | −1.4871 | 0.1025 | −0.8445 | — | | — | | | | | | ^{[a]}^{[b]} |
| November 26, 1890 | 13:33:54 | 114 | Partial | −0.9994 | 1.0470 | 0.0017 | 0:10 | — | 13:29 | — | | 13:39 | | | ^{[a]}^{[b]} |
| May 23, 1891 | 18:29:17 | 119 | Total | 0.2988 | 2.3199 | 1.2996 | 3:36 | 1:19 | 16:41 | 17:50 | 19:09 | 20:17 | | | ^{[a]}^{[b]} |
| November 16, 1891 | 00:18:53 | 124 | Total | −0.2592 | 2.3766 | 1.3880 | 3:28 | 1:23 | 22:35 | 23:37 | 01:00 | 02:03 | | | ^{[a]}^{[b]} |
| May 11, 1892 | 22:53:26 | 129 | Partial | −0.4734 | 2.0236 | 0.9555 | 3:26 | — | 21:10 | — | | 00:37 | | | ^{[a]}^{[b]} |
| November 4, 1892 | 15:44:59 | 134 | Total | 0.4267 | 2.0565 | 1.0930 | 3:12 | 0:44 | 14:09 | 15:23 | 16:07 | 17:21 | | | ^{[a]}^{[b]} |
| April 30, 1893 | 23:09:03 | 139 | Penumbral | −1.2119 | 0.6713 | −0.4023 | — | | — | | | | | | ^{[a]}^{[b]} |
| September 25, 1893 | 20:39:09 | 106 | Penumbral | −1.5476 | 0.0190 | −0.9825 | — | | — | | | | | | ^{[a]}^{[b]} |
| October 25, 1893 | 07:16:21 | 144 | Penumbral | 1.1305 | 0.7753 | −0.2084 | — | | — | | | | | | ^{[a]}^{[b]} |
| March 21, 1894 | 14:20:34 | 111 | Partial | 0.8770 | 1.2549 | 0.2424 | 1:49 | — | 13:26 | — | | 15:15 | | | ^{[a]}^{[b]} |
| September 15, 1894 | 04:31:32 | 116 | Partial | −0.8748 | 1.2797 | 0.2261 | 1:51 | — | 03:36 | — | | 05:27 | | | ^{[a]}^{[b]} |
| March 11, 1895 | 03:39:16 | 121 | Total | 0.1376 | 2.5904 | 1.6204 | 3:31 | 1:35 | 01:54 | 02:52 | 04:27 | 05:25 | | | ^{[a]}^{[b]} |
| September 4, 1895 | 05:56:58 | 126 | Total | −0.1449 | 2.6317 | 1.5530 | 3:54 | 1:41 | 04:00 | 05:07 | 06:47 | 07:54 | | | ^{[a]}^{[b]} |
| February 28, 1896 | 19:45:46 | 131 | Partial | −0.5488 | 1.8342 | 0.8673 | 2:58 | — | 18:17 | — | | 21:15 | | | ^{[a]}^{[b]} |
| August 23, 1896 | 06:57:24 | 136 | Partial | 0.5997 | 1.7849 | 0.7306 | 3:05 | — | 05:25 | — | | 08:30 | | | ^{[a]}^{[b]} |
| January 18, 1897 | 20:33:15 | 103 | Penumbral | 1.5332 | 0.0659 | −0.9763 | — | | — | | | | | | ^{[a]}^{[b]} |
| February 17, 1897 | 09:57:48 | 141 | Penumbral | −1.2717 | 0.5281 | −0.4790 | — | | — | | | | | | ^{[a]}^{[b]} |
| July 14, 1897 | 05:05:26 | 108 | Penumbral | −1.2879 | 0.4792 | −0.4902 | — | | — | | | | | | ^{[a]}^{[b]} |
| August 12, 1897 | 14:08:42 | 146 | Penumbral | 1.3135 | 0.4472 | −0.5517 | — | | — | | | | | | ^{[a]}^{[b]} |
| January 8, 1898 | 00:34:51 | 113 | Partial | 0.9046 | 1.2456 | 0.1515 | 1:33 | — | 23:48 | — | | 01:22 | | | ^{[a]}^{[b]} |
| July 3, 1898 | 21:17:24 | 118 | Partial | −0.5228 | 1.8689 | 0.9280 | 3:02 | — | 19:46 | — | | 22:49 | | | ^{[a]}^{[b]} |
| December 27, 1898 | 23:41:56 | 123 | Total | 0.2339 | 2.4809 | 1.3777 | 3:48 | 1:29 | 21:48 | 22:58 | 00:26 | 01:36 | | | ^{[a]}^{[b]} |
| June 23, 1899 | 14:17:56 | 128 | Total | 0.2169 | 2.4376 | 1.4820 | 3:30 | 1:30 | 12:33 | 13:33 | 15:03 | 16:03 | | | ^{[a]}^{[b]} |
| December 17, 1899 | 01:25:48 | 133 | Partial | −0.4551 | 2.0541 | 0.9922 | 3:22 | — | 23:45 | — | | 03:07 | | | ^{[a]}^{[b]} |
| June 13, 1900 | 03:27:39 | 138 | Penumbral | 1.0134 | 1.0010 | −0.0040 | — | | — | | | | | | ^{[a]}^{[b]} |
| December 6, 1900 | 10:26:31 | 143 | Penumbral | −1.1125 | 0.8183 | −0.1851 | — | | — | | | | | | ^{[a]}^{[b]} |

== See also ==
- Lists of lunar eclipses
- Lunar eclipses by century
- List of lunar eclipses in the 20th century
- List of lunar eclipses in the 21st century
- List of lunar eclipses in the 22nd century
