= List of lunar eclipses in the 20th century =

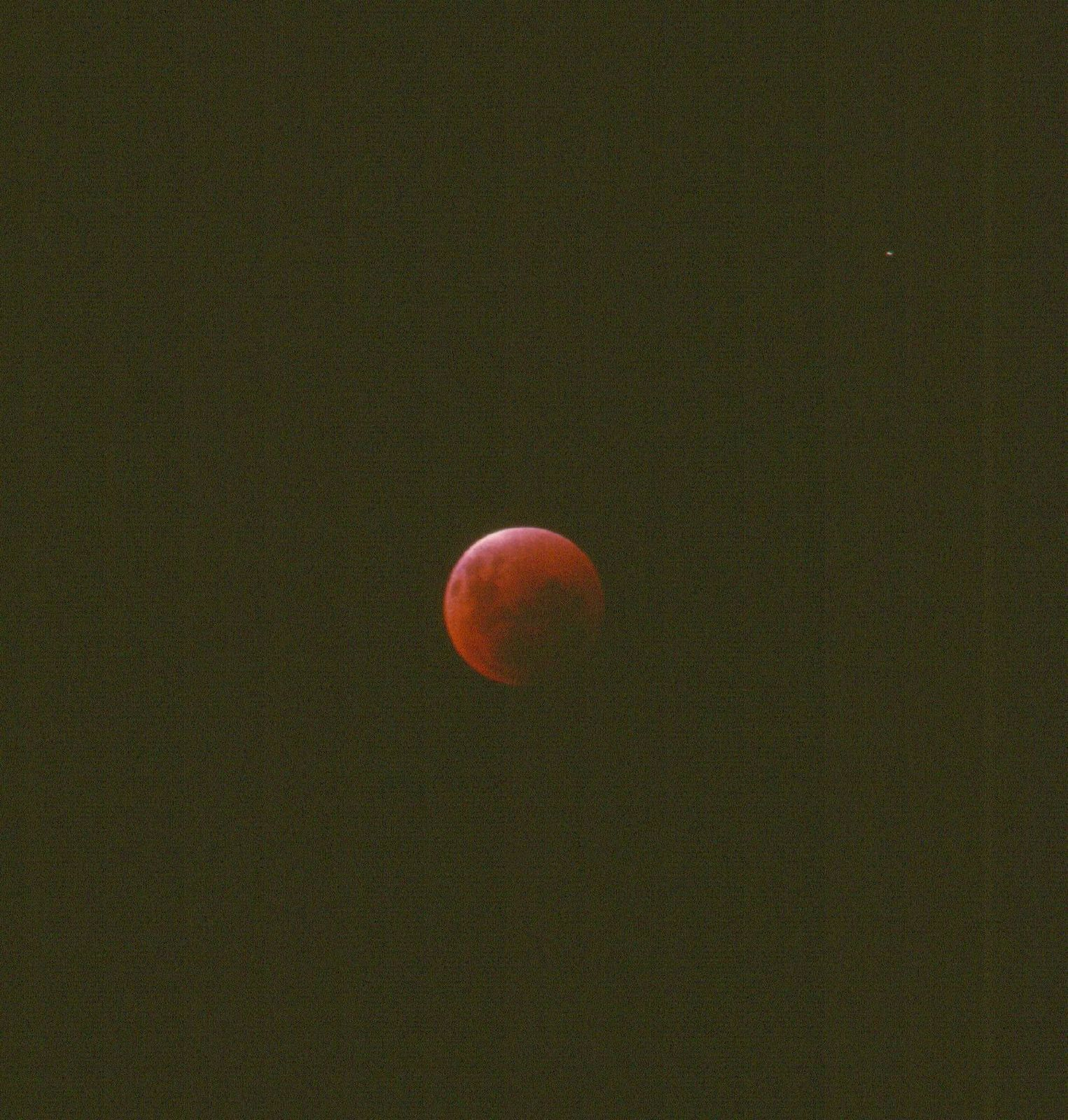
Total lunar eclipse of 17 August 1989, from England.

During the 20th century, there were 229 lunar eclipses of which 83 were penumbral, 65 were partial and 81 were total. Of the total eclipses, 33 were central, in the sense that the Moon passed through the very center (axis) of the Earth's shadow (for more information see gamma). In the 20th century, the greatest number of eclipses in one year was four, in 1908, 1915, 1926, 1933, 1944, 1951, 1973, and 1991. One month, March 1904, featured two lunar eclipses, on March 2 and March 31. The predictions given here are by Fred Espenak of NASA's Goddard Space Flight Center.

The longest measured duration in which the Earth completely covered the Moon, known as totality, was during the lunar eclipse of July 16, 2000. This total lunar eclipse had a maximum duration of 1 hour, 46 minutes, and 24 seconds. The longest possible duration of a total lunar eclipse is 1 hour and 47 minutes.^{[a]}

The table contains the date and time of the greatest eclipse (in dynamical time, which in this case is the time when the axis of the Earth's shadow passes over the Moon; this is in (Ephemeris Time). The number of the saros series that the eclipse belongs to is given, followed by the type of the eclipse (either total, partial or penumbral), the gamma of the eclipse (how centrally the Moon passed through the Earth's shadow), and both the penumbral and umbral magnitude of the eclipse (the fraction of the Moon's diameter obscured by the Earth). For each eclipse, the duration of the eclipse is given, as well as the eclipse's contacts (the points at which the Moon reaches and exits the Earth's penumbra and umbra).

Eclipses are listed in sets by lunar years, repeating every 12 months for each node. Ascending node eclipses are given a red background highlight, and descending node eclipses are given a blue background highlight.

== Eclipses ==
Date	Time of greatest eclipse (Terrestrial Time)	Saros	Type	Gamma	Magnitude		Duration (hr:min)		Contacts (UTC) (hr:min)				Chart	Visibility	Ref(s)
Date	Time of greatest eclipse (Terrestrial Time)	Saros	Type	Gamma	Pen.	Umb.	Par.	Tot.	U1	U2	U3	U4	Chart	Visibility	Ref(s)
May 3, 1901	18:30:39	110	Penumbral	−1.0101	1.0431	−0.0334	—		—						^{[a]}
October 27, 1901	15:15:18	115	Partial	0.9021	1.1841	0.2208	1:39	—	14:26	—		16:05			^{[a]}
April 22, 1902	18:52:40	120	Total	−0.2680	2.4002	1.3327	3:45	1:25	17:00	18:10	19:35	20:45			^{[a]}
October 17, 1902	06:03:25	125	Total	0.2201	2.4514	1.4566	3:32	1:29	04:17	05:19	06:48	07:50			^{[a]}
April 12, 1903	00:12:58	130	Partial	0.4798	1.9877	0.9677	3:17	—	22:35	—		01:51			^{[a]}
October 6, 1903	15:17:31	135	Partial	−0.5280	1.9133	0.8654	3:14	—	13:41	—		16:54			^{[a]}
March 2, 1904	03:02:31	102	Penumbral	−1.4528	0.1748	−0.7910	—		—						^{[a]}
March 31, 1904	12:32:25	140	Penumbral	1.1665	0.7036	−0.2688	—		—						^{[a]}
September 24, 1904	17:34:41	145	Penumbral	−1.2837	0.5440	−0.5384	—		—						^{[a]}
February 19, 1905	18:59:58	112	Partial	−0.7984	1.3809	0.4049	2:12	—	17:54	—		20:06			^{[a]}
August 15, 1905	03:40:55	117	Partial	0.8456	1.3259	0.2871	2:03	—	02:39	—		04:42			^{[a]}
February 9, 1906	07:46:52	122	Total	−0.1199	2.6507	1.6254	3:39	1:38	05:57	06:58	08:36	09:37			^{[a]}
August 4, 1906	13:00:05	127	Total	0.0477	2.7615	1.7793	3:39	1:41	11:11	12:09	13:51	14:49			^{[a]}
January 29, 1907	13:37:53	132	Partial	0.6027	1.7936	0.7110	3:03	—	12:06	—		15:10			^{[a]}
July 25, 1907	04:22:20	137	Partial	−0.6924	1.5595	0.6149	2:37	—	03:04	—		05:41			^{[a]}
January 18, 1908	13:21:29	142	Penumbral	1.2939	0.5370	−0.5685	—		—						^{[a]}
June 14, 1908	14:06:24	109	Penumbral	1.1053	0.8135	−0.1541	—		—						^{[a]}
July 13, 1908	21:33:47	147	Penumbral	−1.4185	0.2292	−0.7195	—		—						^{[a]}
December 7, 1908	21:55:00	114	Penumbral	−1.0059	1.0344	−0.0096	—		—						^{[a]}
June 4, 1909	01:28:41	119	Total	0.3755	2.1800	1.1580	3:30	1:00	23:44	00:59	01:59	03:14			^{[a]}
November 27, 1909	08:54:31	124	Total	−0.2712	2.3544	1.3660	3:27	1:21	07:11	08:14	09:35	10:38			^{[a]}
May 24, 1910	05:34:05	129	Total	−0.3975	2.1625	1.0950	3:35	0:50	03:46	05:09	05:59	07:22			^{[a]}
November 17, 1910	00:20:41	134	Total	0.4089	2.0905	1.1246	3:13	0:51	22:44	23:55	00:46	01:57			^{[a]}
May 13, 1911	05:56:11	139	Penumbral	−1.1413	0.7987	−0.2706	—		—						^{[a]}
November 6, 1911	15:36:32	144	Penumbral	1.1100	0.8154	−0.1733	—		—						^{[a]}
April 1, 1912	22:14:02	111	Partial	0.9116	1.1884	0.1820	1:35	—	21:26	—		23:02			^{[a]}
September 26, 1912	11:44:36	116	Partial	−0.9320	1.1779	0.1183	1:22	—	11:04	—		12:26			^{[a]}
March 22, 1913	11:57:34	121	Total	0.1671	2.5340	1.5683	3:29	1:33	10:13	11:11	12:44	13:42			^{[a]}
September 15, 1913	12:48:04	126	Total	−0.2109	2.5122	1.4304	3:51	1:33	10:53	12:01	13:35	14:43			^{[a]}
March 12, 1914	04:12:52	131	Partial	−0.5254	1.8764	0.9111	3:01	—	02:42	—		05:44			^{[a]}
September 4, 1914	13:54:40	136	Partial	0.5301	1.9127	0.8585	3:16	—	12:17	—		15:33			^{[a]}
January 31, 1915	04:57:25	103	Penumbral	1.5450	0.0451	−0.9989	—		—						^{[a]}
March 1, 1915	18:19:15	141	Penumbral	−1.2573	0.5548	−0.4528	—		—						^{[a]}
July 26, 1915	12:24:21	108	Penumbral	−1.3553	0.3545	−0.6129	—		—						^{[a]}
August 24, 1915	21:27:00	146	Penumbral	1.2435	0.5750	−0.4226	—		—						^{[a]}
January 20, 1916	08:39:22	113	Partial	0.9146	1.2277	0.1327	1:28	—	07:56	—		09:23			^{[a]}
July 15, 1916	04:45:49	118	Partial	−0.5956	1.7351	0.7944	2:53	—	03:20	—		06:12			^{[a]}
January 8, 1917	07:44:29	123	Total	0.2415	2.4663	1.3642	3:47	1:28	05:51	07:01	08:28	09:38			^{[a]}
July 4, 1917	21:38:44	128	Total	0.1419	2.5762	1.6185	3:33	1:36	19:52	20:51	22:27	23:25			^{[a]}
December 28, 1917	09:46:11	133	Total	−0.4484	2.0652	1.0056	3:22	0:12	08:05	09:40	09:52	11:27			^{[a]}
June 24, 1918	10:27:43	138	Partial	0.9397	1.1376	0.1297	1:22	—	09:47	—		11:09			^{[a]}
December 17, 1918	19:05:40	143	Penumbral	−1.1035	0.8340	−0.1679	—		—						^{[a]}
May 15, 1919	01:13:39	110	Penumbral	−1.0820	0.9103	−0.1644	—		—						^{[a]}
November 7, 1919	23:44:07	115	Partial	0.9246	1.1445	0.1780	1:30	—	22:59	—		00:29			^{[a]}
May 3, 1920	01:50:47	120	Total	−0.3312	2.2818	1.2194	3:40	1:12	00:01	01:15	02:27	03:41			^{[a]}
October 27, 1920	14:11:16	125	Total	0.2502	2.3992	1.3987	3:31	1:25	12:26	13:29	14:54	15:57			^{[a]}
April 22, 1921	07:44:17	130	Total	0.4269	2.0816	1.0678	3:22	0:40	06:03	07:24	08:04	09:25			^{[a]}
October 16, 1921	22:53:37	135	Partial	−0.4902	1.9858	0.9317	3:19	—	21:14	—		00:33			^{[a]}
March 13, 1922	11:28:25	102	Penumbral	−1.4752	0.1320	−0.8304	—		—						^{[a]}
April 11, 1922	20:31:50	140	Penumbral	1.1228	0.7812	−0.1863	—		—						^{[a]}
October 6, 1922	00:43:27	145	Penumbral	−1.2348	0.6358	−0.4508	—		—						^{[a]}
March 3, 1923	03:31:46	112	Partial	−0.8175	1.3453	0.3701	2:07	—	02:28	—		04:35			^{[a]}
August 26, 1923	10:39:28	117	Partial	0.9133	1.2013	0.1634	1:34	—	09:52	—		11:27			^{[a]}
February 20, 1924	16:08:31	122	Total	−0.1338	2.6256	1.5995	3:40	1:37	14:19	15:20	16:57	17:58			^{[a]}
August 14, 1924	20:20:07	127	Total	0.1175	2.6326	1.6519	3:37	1:38	18:32	19:31	21:09	22:09			^{[a]}
February 8, 1925	21:41:58	132	Partial	0.5921	1.8134	0.7304	3:06	—	20:09	—		23:15			^{[a]}
August 4, 1925	11:52:33	137	Partial	−0.6208	1.6909	0.7463	2:49	—	10:28	—		13:17			^{[a]}
January 28, 1926	21:20:01	142	Penumbral	1.2836	0.5551	−0.5488	—		—						^{[a]}
June 25, 1926	21:24:43	109	Penumbral	1.1814	0.6749	−0.2948	—		—						^{[a]}
July 25, 1926	04:59:48	147	Penumbral	−1.3511	0.3542	−0.5970	—		—						^{[a]}
December 19, 1926	06:19:43	114	Penumbral	−1.0101	1.0257	−0.0163	—		—						^{[a]}
June 15, 1927	08:24:17	119	Total	0.4543	2.0365	1.0123	3:23	0:18	06:43	08:15	08:33	10:06			^{[a]}
December 8, 1927	17:34:46	124	Total	−0.2796	2.3389	1.3510	3:26	1:20	15:52	16:55	18:15	19:18			^{[a]}
June 3, 1928	12:09:33	129	Total	−0.3175	2.3092	1.2421	3:43	1:15	10:18	11:32	12:47	14:01			^{[a]}
November 27, 1928	09:01:23	134	Total	0.3952	2.1166	1.1486	3:14	0:55	07:24	08:34	09:29	10:38			^{[a]}
May 23, 1929	12:37:21	139	Penumbral	−1.0650	0.9367	−0.1287	—		—						^{[a]}
November 17, 1929	00:02:49	144	Penumbral	1.0947	0.8460	−0.1474	—		—						^{[a]}
April 13, 1930	05:58:30	111	Partial	0.9545	1.1066	0.1064	1:13	—	05:22	—		06:35			^{[a]}
October 7, 1930	19:06:46	116	Partial	−0.9811	1.0906	0.0252	0:38	—	18:48	—		19:26			^{[a]}
April 2, 1931	20:07:31	121	Total	0.2043	2.4637	1.5021	3:28	1:30	18:24	19:23	20:52	21:51			^{[a]}
September 26, 1931	19:48:05	126	Total	−0.2698	2.4058	1.3208	3:47	1:24	17:55	19:06	20:30	21:42			^{[a]}
March 22, 1932	12:32:15	131	Partial	−0.4956	1.9303	0.9666	3:05	—	11:00	—		14:05			^{[a]}
September 14, 1932	21:00:36	136	Partial	0.4664	2.0296	0.9752	3:24	—	19:19	—		22:43			^{[a]}
February 10, 1933	13:17:09	103	Penumbral	1.5600	0.0182	−1.0270	—		—						^{[a]}
March 12, 1933	02:32:40	141	Penumbral	−1.2369	0.5923	−0.4154	—		—						^{[a]}
August 5, 1933	19:45:41	108	Penumbral	−1.4216	0.2322	−0.7338	—		—						^{[a]}
September 4, 1933	04:51:56	146	Penumbral	1.1776	0.6955	−0.3013	—		—						^{[a]}
January 30, 1934	16:42:18	113	Partial	0.9258	1.2073	0.1120	1:21	—	16:02	—		17:23			^{[a]}
July 26, 1934	12:15:14	118	Partial	−0.6681	1.6025	0.6612	2:41	—	10:55	—		13:36			^{[a]}
January 19, 1935	15:47:11	123	Total	0.2498	2.4502	1.3499	3:47	1:26	13:54	15:04	16:30	17:41			^{[a]}
July 16, 1935	04:59:41	128	Total	0.0672	2.7146	1.7542	3:35	1:40	03:12	04:10	05:50	06:47			^{[a]}
January 8, 1936	18:09:34	133	Total	−0.4428	2.0740	1.0173	3:23	0:21	16:28	17:59	18:20	19:51			^{[a]}
July 4, 1936	17:25:00	138	Partial	0.8642	1.2778	0.2668	1:56	—	16:27	—		18:23			^{[a]}
December 28, 1936	03:48:45	143	Penumbral	−1.0970	0.8451	−0.1550	—		—						^{[a]}
May 25, 1937	07:51:10	110	Penumbral	−1.1581	0.7697	−0.3033	—		—						^{[a]}
November 18, 1937	08:19:02	115	Partial	0.9421	1.1141	0.1443	1:21	—	07:38	—		09:00			^{[a]}
May 14, 1938	08:43:36	120	Total	−0.3994	2.1540	1.0966	3:33	0:49	06:57	08:19	09:08	10:30			^{[a]}
November 7, 1938	22:26:18	125	Total	0.2738	2.3585	1.3525	3:30	1:21	20:41	21:46	23:07	00:11			^{[a]}
May 3, 1939	15:11:18	130	Total	0.3693	2.1842	1.1765	3:27	1:02	13:28	14:40	15:42	16:55			^{[a]}
October 28, 1939	06:36:19	135	Partial	−0.4581	2.0477	0.9877	3:23	—	04:55	—		08:18			^{[a]}
March 23, 1940	19:47:55	102	Penumbral	−1.5033	0.0788	−0.8803	—		—						^{[a]}
April 22, 1940	04:26:01	140	Penumbral	1.0741	0.8683	−0.0945	—		—						^{[a]}
October 16, 1940	08:00:53	145	Penumbral	−1.1924	0.7156	−0.3749	—		—						^{[a]}
March 13, 1941	11:55:22	112	Partial	−0.8436	1.2970	0.3226	2:00	—	10:56	—		12:55			^{[a]}
September 5, 1941	17:46:50	117	Partial	0.9746	1.0884	0.0511	0:53	—	17:20	—		18:13			^{[a]}
March 3, 1942	00:21:28	122	Total	−0.1545	2.5879	1.5612	3:40	1:36	22:32	23:34	01:09	02:11			^{[a]}
August 26, 1942	03:48:00	127	Total	0.1818	2.5142	1.5344	3:34	1:33	02:01	03:01	04:35	05:35			^{[a]}
February 20, 1943	05:37:57	132	Partial	0.5751	1.8444	0.7616	3:09	—	04:03	—		07:12			^{[a]}
August 15, 1943	19:28:19	137	Partial	−0.5533	1.8152	0.8697	2:58	—	17:59	—		20:58			^{[a]}
February 9, 1944	05:14:30	142	Penumbral	1.2698	0.5792	−0.5223	—		—						^{[a]}
July 6, 1944	04:39:34	109	Penumbral	1.2596	0.5328	−0.4398	—		—						^{[a]}
August 4, 1944	12:26:24	147	Penumbral	−1.2842	0.4785	−0.4758	—		—						^{[a]}
December 29, 1944	14:49:08	114	Penumbral	−1.0114	1.0220	−0.0176	—		—						^{[a]}
June 25, 1945	15:13:55	119	Partial	0.5370	1.8862	0.8593	3:13	—	13:38	—		16:50			^{[a]}
December 19, 1945	02:20:20	124	Total	−0.2845	2.3293	1.3424	3:25	1:19	00:38	01:41	03:00	04:03			^{[a]}
June 14, 1946	18:38:49	129	Total	−0.2324	2.4654	1.3983	3:49	1:31	16:44	17:53	19:24	20:33			^{[a]}
December 8, 1946	17:48:01	134	Total	0.3864	2.1337	1.1639	3:15	0:57	16:11	17:19	18:17	19:25			^{[a]}
June 3, 1947	19:15:16	139	Partial	−0.9849	1.0818	0.0202	0:35	—	18:58	—		19:33			^{[a]}
November 28, 1947	08:34:01	144	Penumbral	1.0838	0.8683	−0.1297	—		—						^{[a]}
April 23, 1948	13:38:50	111	Partial	1.0016	1.0171	0.0229	0:34	—	13:22	—		13:56			^{[a]}
October 18, 1948	02:35:12	116	Penumbral	−1.0245	1.0140	−0.0572	—		—						^{[a]}
April 13, 1949	04:10:56	121	Total	0.2474	2.3825	1.4251	3:26	1:25	02:28	03:28	04:53	05:54			^{[a]}
October 7, 1949	02:56:26	126	Total	−0.3219	2.3118	1.2236	3:43	1:13	01:05	02:20	03:33	04:48			^{[a]}
April 2, 1950	20:44:05	131	Total	−0.4598	1.9951	1.0329	3:10	0:27	19:09	20:31	20:58	22:19			^{[a]}
September 26, 1950	04:16:42	136	Total	0.4101	2.1331	1.0783	3:30	0:44	02:32	03:55	04:39	06:02			^{[a]}
February 21, 1951	21:29:12	103	Penumbral	1.5806	0.0069	−1.0600	—		—						
March 23, 1951	10:37:04	141	Penumbral	−1.2099	0.6418	−0.3661	—		—						^{[a]}
August 17, 1951	03:14:09	108	Penumbral	−1.4828	0.1195	−0.8456	—		—						^{[a]}
September 15, 1951	12:26:37	146	Penumbral	1.1186	0.8034	−0.1928	—		—						^{[a]}
February 11, 1952	00:39:18	113	Partial	0.9416	1.1781	0.0832	1:10	—	00:04	—		01:14			^{[a]}
August 5, 1952	19:47:25	118	Partial	−0.7383	1.4741	0.5317	2:27	—	18:34	—		21:01			^{[a]}
January 29, 1953	23:47:18	123	Total	0.2606	2.4291	1.3314	3:46	1:25	21:54	23:05	00:30	01:40			^{[a]}
July 26, 1953	12:20:40	128	Total	−0.0071	2.8265	1.8628	3:36	1:41	10:33	11:30	13:11	14:09			^{[a]}
January 19, 1954	02:31:50	133	Total	−0.4357	2.0853	1.0322	3:23	0:28	00:50	02:18	02:46	04:13			^{[a]}
July 16, 1954	00:20:20	138	Partial	0.7876	1.4202	0.4054	2:21	—	23:10	—		01:31			^{[a]}
January 8, 1955	12:32:49	143	Penumbral	−1.0906	0.8555	−0.1421	—		—						^{[a]}
June 5, 1955	14:22:52	110	Penumbral	−1.2383	0.6218	−0.4498	—		—						^{[a]}
November 29, 1955	16:59:28	115	Partial	0.9551	1.0917	0.1190	1:14	—	16:22	—		17:37			^{[a]}
May 24, 1956	15:31:20	120	Partial	−0.4726	2.0174	0.9647	3:24	—	13:49	—		17:14			^{[a]}
November 18, 1956	06:47:44	125	Total	0.2917	2.3285	1.3172	3:29	1:18	05:03	06:09	07:27	08:32			^{[a]}
May 13, 1957	22:30:56	130	Total	0.3045	2.3001	1.2982	3:32	1:18	20:45	21:52	23:10	00:17			^{[a]}
November 7, 1957	14:26:58	135	Total	−0.4332	2.0963	1.0305	3:27	0:28	12:44	14:13	14:41	16:10			^{[a]}
April 4, 1958	03:59:43	102	Penumbral	−1.5380	0.0135	−0.9422	—		—						^{[a]}
May 3, 1958	12:12:57	140	Partial	1.0188	0.9676	0.0092	0:21	—	12:02	—		12:23			^{[a]}
October 27, 1958	15:27:17	145	Penumbral	−1.1570	0.7825	−0.3118	—		—						^{[a]}
March 24, 1959	20:11:24	112	Partial	−0.8757	1.2379	0.2643	1:50	—	19:17	—		21:06			^{[a]}
September 17, 1959	01:03:04	117	Penumbral	1.0296	0.9874	−0.0496	—		—						^{[a]}
March 13, 1960	08:27:48	122	Total	−0.1799	2.5415	1.5145	3:39	1:34	06:38	07:41	09:15	10:18			^{[a]}
September 5, 1960	11:21:17	127	Total	0.2422	2.4031	1.4239	3:31	1:27	09:36	10:38	12:05	13:07			^{[a]}
March 2, 1961	13:28:06	132	Partial	0.5540	1.8828	0.8006	3:13	—	11:52	—		15:05			^{[a]}
August 26, 1961	03:08:17	137	Partial	−0.4894	1.9330	0.9863	3:06	—	01:35	—		04:41			^{[a]}
February 19, 1962	13:03:08	142	Penumbral	1.2511	0.6120	−0.4865	—		—						^{[a]}
July 17, 1962	11:54:15	109	Penumbral	1.3370	0.3924	−0.5835	—		—						^{[a]}
August 15, 1962	19:56:56	147	Penumbral	−1.2210	0.5963	−0.3616	—		—						^{[a]}
January 9, 1963	23:19:08	114	Penumbral	−1.0128	1.0180	−0.0185	—		—						^{[a]}
July 6, 1963	22:02:24	119	Partial	0.6197	1.7360	0.7060	3:00	—	20:33	—		23:32			^{[a]}
December 30, 1963	11:06:50	124	Total	−0.2889	2.3206	1.3350	3:24	1:18	09:25	10:28	11:46	12:49			^{[a]}
June 25, 1964	01:06:14	129	Total	−0.1461	2.6238	1.5565	3:53	1:41	23:10	00:16	01:57	03:03			^{[a]}
December 19, 1964	02:37:18	134	Total	0.3801	2.1461	1.1748	3:16	0:59	01:00	02:08	03:07	04:15			^{[a]}
June 14, 1965	01:48:50	139	Partial	−0.9005	1.2351	0.1767	1:40	—	00:59	—		02:39			^{[a]}
December 8, 1965	17:09:55	144	Penumbral	1.0774	0.8820	−0.1201	—		—						^{[a]}
May 4, 1966	21:11:29	111	Penumbral	1.0553	0.9157	−0.0728	—		—						^{[a]}
October 29, 1966	10:12:16	116	Penumbral	−1.0599	0.9517	−0.1249	—		—						^{[a]}
April 24, 1967	12:06:26	121	Total	0.2972	2.2892	1.3356	3:23	1:18	10:25	11:27	12:45	13:48			^{[a]}
October 18, 1967	10:15:10	126	Total	−0.3653	2.2337	1.1426	3:39	1:00	08:26	09:45	10:45	12:05			^{[a]}
April 13, 1968	04:47:22	131	Total	−0.4173	2.0725	1.1116	3:14	0:49	03:10	04:23	05:12	06:24			^{[a]}
October 6, 1968	11:41:56	136	Total	0.3605	2.2242	1.1691	3:34	1:03	09:55	11:10	12:13	13:29			^{[a]}
April 2, 1969	18:32:27	141	Penumbral	−1.1764	0.7033	−0.3047	—		—						^{[a]}
August 27, 1969	10:47:35	108	Penumbral	−1.5407	0.0131	−0.9516	—		—						^{[a]}
September 25, 1969	20:09:39	146	Penumbral	1.0655	0.9007	−0.0953	—		—						^{[a]}
February 21, 1970	08:30:03	113	Partial	0.9619	1.1402	0.0463	0:53	—	08:04	—		08:56			^{[a]}
August 17, 1970	03:23:25	118	Partial	−0.8053	1.3521	0.4079	2:11	—	02:18	—		04:29			^{[a]}
February 10, 1971	07:44:40	123	Total	0.2741	2.4026	1.3082	3:45	1:22	05:52	07:04	08:26	09:37			^{[a]}
August 6, 1971	19:43:10	128	Total	−0.0794	2.6958	1.7283	3:36	1:39	17:55	18:53	20:33	21:31			^{[a]}
January 30, 1972	10:53:23	133	Total	−0.4273	2.0987	1.0497	3:23	0:35	09:12	10:36	11:11	12:35			^{[a]}
July 26, 1972	07:15:39	138	Partial	0.7116	1.5618	0.5427	2:40	—	05:56	—		08:36			^{[a]}
January 18, 1973	21:17:15	143	Penumbral	−1.0844	0.8655	−0.1293	—		—						^{[a]}
June 15, 1973	20:49:57	110	Penumbral	−1.3216	0.4685	−0.6020	—		—						^{[a]}
July 15, 1973	11:38:35	148	Penumbral	1.5177	0.1046	−0.9581	—		—						^{[a]}
December 10, 1973	01:44:22	115	Partial	0.9644	1.0760	0.1007	1:08	—	01:10	—		02:19			^{[a]}
June 4, 1974	22:15:59	120	Partial	−0.5488	1.8752	0.8269	3:14	—	20:39	—		23:53			^{[a]}
November 29, 1974	15:13:22	125	Total	0.3054	2.3057	1.2896	3:29	1:16	13:29	14:36	15:51	16:58			^{[a]}
May 25, 1975	05:48:01	130	Total	0.2367	2.4218	1.4253	3:35	1:28	04:00	05:04	06:32	07:36			^{[a]}
November 18, 1975	22:23:26	135	Total	−0.4134	2.1352	1.0642	3:29	0:40	20:39	22:03	22:44	00:08			^{[a]}
May 13, 1976	19:54:21	140	Partial	0.9585	1.0761	0.1217	1:15	—	19:17	—		20:32			^{[a]}
November 6, 1976	23:01:12	145	Penumbral	−1.1275	0.8383	−0.2594	—		—						^{[a]}
April 4, 1977	04:18:16	112	Partial	−0.9148	1.1657	0.1928	1:35	—	03:31	—		05:06			^{[a]}
September 27, 1977	08:29:20	117	Penumbral	1.0768	0.9007	−0.1361	—		—						^{[a]}
March 24, 1978	16:22:22	122	Total	−0.2140	2.4790	1.4518	3:39	1:31	14:33	15:37	17:08	18:12			^{[a]}
September 16, 1978	19:04:12	127	Total	0.2951	2.3060	1.3268	3:27	1:19	17:21	18:25	19:44	20:48			^{[a]}
March 13, 1979	21:08:02	132	Partial	0.5253	1.9350	0.8538	3:18	—	19:29	—		22:47			^{[a]}
September 6, 1979	10:54:12	137	Total	−0.4305	2.0421	1.0936	3:12	0:44	09:18	10:32	11:16	12:30			^{[a]}
March 1, 1980	20:45:12	142	Penumbral	1.2269	0.6545	−0.4405	—		—						^{[a]}
July 27, 1980	19:08:08	109	Penumbral	1.4138	0.2535	−0.7264	—		—						^{[a]}
August 26, 1980	03:30:29	147	Penumbral	−1.1608	0.7089	−0.2531	—		—						^{[a]}
January 20, 1981	07:49:57	114	Penumbral	−1.0141	1.0136	−0.0192	—		—						^{[a]}
July 17, 1981	04:46:48	119	Partial	0.7045	1.5822	0.5486	2:43	—	03:25	—		06:08			^{[a]}
January 9, 1982	19:55:51	124	Total	−0.2916	2.3147	1.3310	3:24	1:18	18:14	19:17	20:35	21:38			^{[a]}
July 6, 1982	07:30:55	129	Total	−0.0579	2.7860	1.7179	3:56	1:46	05:33	06:38	08:24	09:29			^{[a]}
December 30, 1982	11:28:44	134	Total	0.3758	2.1545	1.1822	3:16	1:00	09:51	10:59	11:59	13:07			^{[a]}
June 25, 1983	08:22:18	139	Partial	−0.8151	1.3901	0.3348	2:15	—	07:15	—		09:30			^{[a]}
December 20, 1983	01:49:04	144	Penumbral	1.0746	0.8890	−0.1167	—		—						^{[a]}
May 15, 1984	04:40:09	111	Penumbral	1.1130	0.8071	−0.1760	—		—						^{[a]}
June 13, 1984	14:25:45	149	Penumbral	−1.5239	0.0647	−0.9414	—		—						^{[a]}
November 8, 1984	17:55:14	116	Penumbral	−1.0899	0.8992	−0.1825	—		—						^{[a]}
May 4, 1985	19:56:24	121	Total	0.3519	2.1870	1.2369	3:19	1:08	18:17	19:23	20:30	21:36			^{[a]}
October 28, 1985	17:44:22	126	Total	−0.4022	2.1673	1.0736	3:35	0:44	15:55	17:20	18:04	19:30			^{[a]}
April 24, 1986	12:42:35	131	Total	−0.3682	2.1620	1.2022	3:19	1:04	11:03	12:11	13:14	14:22			^{[a]}
October 17, 1986	19:17:59	136	Total	0.3188	2.3008	1.2455	3:37	1:14	17:30	18:41	19:55	21:06			^{[a]}
April 14, 1987	02:18:54	141	Penumbral	−1.1364	0.7769	−0.2313	—		—						^{[a]}
October 7, 1987	04:01:35	146	Penumbral	1.0189	0.9863	−0.0096	—		—						^{[a]}
March 3, 1988	16:12:45	113	Penumbral	0.9885	1.0907	−0.0017	—		—						^{[a]}
August 27, 1988	11:04:33	118	Partial	−0.8681	1.2380	0.2915	1:53	—	10:08	—		12:01			^{[a]}
February 20, 1989	15:35:22	123	Total	0.2934	2.3651	1.2747	3:43	1:19	13:44	14:56	16:15	17:27			^{[a]}
August 17, 1989	03:08:11	128	Total	−0.1490	2.5703	1.5984	3:34	1:36	01:21	02:20	03:56	04:55			^{[a]}
February 9, 1990	19:11:06	133	Total	−0.4148	2.1191	1.0750	3:24	0:42	17:29	18:50	19:32	20:53			^{[a]}
August 6, 1990	14:12:18	138	Partial	0.6374	1.7005	0.6766	2:56	—	12:45	—		15:40			^{[a]}
January 30, 1991	05:58:40	143	Penumbral	−1.0752	0.8807	−0.1106	—		—						^{[a]}
June 27, 1991	03:14:43	110	Penumbral	−1.4063	0.3126	−0.7572	—		—						^{[a]}
July 26, 1991	18:07:52	148	Penumbral	1.4369	0.2542	−0.8110	—		—						^{[a]}
December 21, 1991	10:33:01	115	Partial	0.9709	1.0651	0.0876	1:04	—	10:01	—		11:05			^{[a]}
June 15, 1992	04:56:58	120	Partial	−0.6288	1.7264	0.6822	3:00	—	03:27	—		06:27			^{[a]}
December 9, 1992	23:44:06	125	Total	0.3144	2.2915	1.2709	3:29	1:14	22:00	23:07	00:21	01:28			^{[a]}
June 4, 1993	13:00:27	130	Total	0.1638	2.5532	1.5617	3:38	1:36	11:12	12:13	13:48	14:49			^{[a]}
November 29, 1993	06:26:06	135	Total	−0.3994	2.1633	1.0876	3:31	0:47	04:41	06:03	06:49	08:12			^{[a]}
May 25, 1994	03:30:20	140	Partial	0.8933	1.1941	0.2432	1:45	—	02:38	—		04:23			^{[a]}
November 18, 1994	06:43:53	145	Penumbral	−1.1047	0.8815	−0.2189	—		—						^{[a]}
April 15, 1995	12:18:03	112	Partial	−0.9593	1.0836	0.1114	1:13	—	11:42	—		12:55			^{[a]}
October 8, 1995	16:04:11	117	Penumbral	1.1179	0.8252	−0.2115	—		—						^{[a]}
April 4, 1996	00:09:46	122	Total	−0.2534	2.4068	1.3795	3:37	1:26	22:21	23:27	00:53	01:58			^{[a]}
September 27, 1996	02:54:22	127	Total	0.3426	2.2188	1.2395	3:23	1:09	01:13	02:20	03:29	04:36			^{[a]}
March 24, 1997	04:39:26	132	Partial	0.4899	1.9994	0.9195	3:23	—	02:58	—		06:21			^{[a]}
September 16, 1997	18:46:39	137	Total	−0.3768	2.1417	1.1909	3:16	1:02	17:08	18:16	19:17	20:25			^{[a]}
March 13, 1998	04:20:05	142	Penumbral	1.1964	0.7086	−0.3824	—		—						^{[a]}
August 8, 1998	02:24:53	109	Penumbral	1.4875	0.1206	−0.8637	—		—						^{[a]}
September 6, 1998	11:10:07	147	Penumbral	−1.1057	0.8121	−0.1544	—		—						^{[a]}
January 31, 1999	16:17:31	114	Penumbral	−1.0189	1.0027	−0.0258	—		—						^{[a]}
July 28, 1999	11:33:43	119	Partial	0.7862	1.4342	0.3966	2:23	—	10:23	—		12:45			^{[a]}
January 21, 2000	04:43:31	124	Total	−0.2957	2.3060	1.3246	3:23	1:17	03:02	04:05	05:22	06:25			^{[a]}
July 16, 2000	13:55:35	129	Total	0.0302	2.8375	1.7684	3:56	1:46	11:58	13:02	14:49	15:54			^{[a]}

== See also ==
- Lists of lunar eclipses
- Lunar eclipses by century
- List of lunar eclipses in the 19th century
- List of lunar eclipses in the 21st century
- List of lunar eclipses in the 22nd century
