= Lunar eclipses by century =

This article gives statistics for lunar eclipses grouped by century. Detailed information about tetrads, timing, and other facts can be found at the linked references.

== General statistics ==
In the 5,000 years from 2000 BC to 3000 AD, there will be a total of 12,064 lunar eclipses:

- 4,378 penumbral eclipses, of which 4,237 were partial and 141 were total
- 4,207 partial eclipses
- 3,479 total eclipses, of which 2,074 were central and 1,405 were non-central

The longest partial lunar eclipse during this period will occur on 8 February 2669, lasting 3:30:02. The longest total eclipse occurred on 31 May 318, with a duration of 01:46:36.

== Lunar eclipses by century ==
Century	No.	Eclipse type			Longest eclipse				Tetrads (Note: Groups of four consecutive total lunar eclipses that occurred during the century)	Ref.
Century	No.	Penumbral	Partial	Total	Partial	Date	Total	Date	Tetrads	Ref.
20th BC	242	88	92	62	03h 28m 59s	27 June 1973 BC	01h 46m 13s	7 April 1922 BC	1	
19th BC	255	98	97	60	03h 27m 24s	30 May 1832 BC	01h 45m 22s	16 February 1817 BC	0	
18th BC	254	94	99	61	03h 21m 47s	20 April 1755 BC	01h 45m 55s	26 February 1799 BC	0	
17th BC	244	90	87	67	03h 28m 13s	2 May 1691 BC	01h 46m 17s	24 June 1647 BC	3	
16th BC	226	85	54	87	03h 28m 10s	18 September 1503 BC	01h 46m 28s	27 May 1506 BC	8	
15th BC	228	86	60	82	03h 26m 42s	12 February 1491 BC	01h 43m 40s	6 June 1488 BC	6	
14th BC	239	83	90	66	03h 24m 52s	30 July 1398 BC	01h 46m 25s	28 April 1365 BC	2	
13th BC	251	92	99	60	03h 29m 15s	21 June 1275 BC	01h 45m 52s	31 March 1224 BC	0	
12th BC	252	96	95	61	03h 29m 36s	24 May 1134 BC	01h 45m 24s	9 February 1119	0	
11th BC	240	88	86	66	03h 24m 45s	16 August 1017 BC	01h 44m 46s	16 July 1090 BC	4	
10th BC	228	80	61	87	03h 28m 45s	25 April 993 BC	01h 44m 57s	17 June 949 BC	7	
9th BC	225	79	62	84	03h 24m 29s	28 March 852 BC	01h 44m 59s	19 May 808 BC	7	
8th BC	239	87	88	64	03h 29m 03s	26 January 765 BC	01h 44m 24s	29 April 779 BC	1	
7th BC	253	91	102	60	03h 26m 27s	12 May 612 BC	01h 45m 34s	13 August 645 BC	0	
6th BC	255	95	100	60	03h 27m 19s	14 June 577 BC	01h 45m 52s	16 July 504 BC	0	
5th BC	242	88	90	64	03h 28m 46s	14 April 471 BC	01h 43m 04s	27 July 486 BC	1	
4th BC	229	80	61	88	03h 29m 18s	20 October 388 BC	01h 46m 11s	6 June 381 BC	7	
3rd BC	228	79	64	85	03h 24m 46s	19 April 295 BC	01h 46m 07s	9 May 240 BC	6	
2nd BC	240	85	86	69	03h 26m 29s	1 July 196 BC	01h 44m 34s	31 March 117 BC	3	
1st BC	253	94	98	61	03h 27m 09s	3 June 55 BC	01h 46m 04s	11 April 99 BC	0	
1st	251	93	101	57	03h 28m 44s	6 May 87	01h 46m 09s	7 August 54	0	
2nd	239	84	88	67	03h 25m 01s	18 September 145	01h 46m 29s	28 June 177	3	
3rd	228	83	63	82	03h 27m 04s	8 April 274	01h 43m 43s	20 May 300	6	
4th	227	76	69	82	03h 29m 37s	12 September 303	01h 46m 36s	31 May 318	4	
5th	244	83	95	86	03h 25m 58s	4 August 426	01h 46m 32s	3 May 459	3	
6th	254	97	95	62	03h 20m 17s	24 May 514	01h 45m 58s	25 March 582	0	
7th	255	97	100	58	03h 22m 31s	26 April 655	01h 44m 57s	23 January 669	0	
8th	240	84	88	68	03h 28m 08s	23 November 774	01h 45m 17s	20 July 743	3	
9th	228	79	60	89	03h 27m 46s	30 April 831	01h 45m 26s	22 June 875	7	
10th	230	82	70	78	03h 27m 56s	5 November 914	01h 44m 39s	14 May 998	6	
11th	246	87	97	62	03h 27m 04s	15 June 1071	01h 45m 14s	24 May 1016	0	
12th	259	98	102	59	03h 28m 05s	17 July 1106	01h 45m 43s	19 August 1179	0	
13th	251	95	96	60	03h 28m 28s	17 May 1212	01h 44m 09s	7 March 1262	0	
14th	231	81	73	77	03h 29m 38s	23 September 1382	01h 45m 57s	10 July 1302	6	
15th	228	80	65	83	03h 28m 46s	18 February 1440	01h 46m 14s	12 June 1443	4	
16th	233	82	74	77	03h 27m 30s	13 April 1511	01h 46m 05s	24 May 1584	6	
17th	249	91	97	61	03h 23m 25s	3 March 1616	01h 44m 41s	4 April 1689	0	
18th	256	98	98	60	03h 20m 50s	9 June 1751	01h 45m 58s	20 September 1736	0	
19th	249	90	97	62	03h 26m 16s	11 May 1892	01h 46m 27s	13 August 1859	0	
20th	229	83	65	81	03h 24m 27s	24 May 1956	01h 46m 24s	16 July 2000	5	
21st	228	86	57	85	03h 28m 23s	19 November 2021	01h 42m 57s	27 July 2018	8	
22nd	238	81	88	69	03h 25m 47s	10 July 2196	01h 46m 06s	9 June 2123	4	
23rd	252	94	97	61	03h 26m 53s	13 August 2231	01h 46m 13s	12 May 2264	0	
24th	253	95	98	60	03h 22m 47s	16 July 2372	01h 45m 24s	24 March 2369	0	
25th	237	83	85	69	03h 27m 28s	9 October 2489	01h 44m 53s	7 September 2416	4	
26th	227	82	58	87	03h 27m 06s	7 March 2547	01h 45m 18s	1 August 2539	8	
27th	230	81	70	79	03h 30m 02s	8 February 2669	01h 45m 16s	4 July 2680	7	
28th	241	86	91	64	03h 26m 10s	2 March 2705	01h 44m 12s	20 December 2792	0	
29th	259	100	102	57	03h 28m 33s	27 June 2876	01h 45m 34s	29 September 2843	0	
30th	249	89	97	63	03h 26m 08s	1 August 2911	01h 45m 57s	22 August 2966	1	

== See also ==
- Historically significant lunar eclipses
