= Historically significant lunar eclipses =

Historical accounts of eclipses

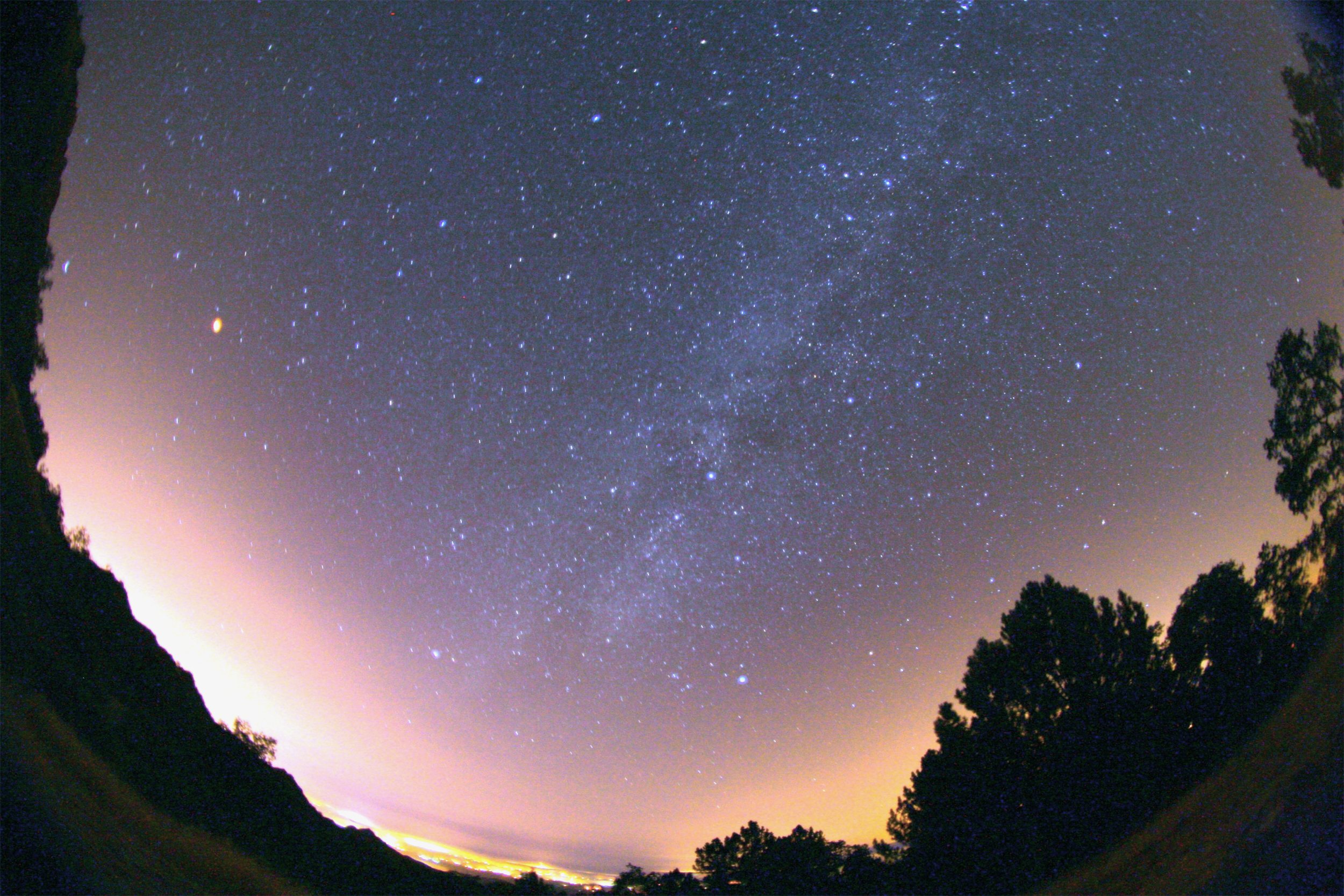
During a total lunar eclipse, this view of most of the sky shows both the Milky Way and the Moon on the left of the image.

Some eclipses of the Moon are mentioned in historical accounts in connection to a significant event. Lunar eclipses are somewhat rare events, although not as rare as solar eclipses, because unlike solar eclipses they can be viewed from anywhere on the dark side of the Earth. Throughout history lunar eclipses have been held to be responsible for lost battles, and have helped make possible extraordinary escapes.

The longest total lunar eclipse of the last 5,000 years occurred May 31, 318 CE. It lasted 106.6 minutes.

== 29 January 1137 BC ==
The first mention of a lunar eclipse was found in the Chinese book Zhou-Shu, a book of the Zhou dynasty. The book was discovered in 280 AD, in a tomb of a king or noblemen. The eclipse mentioned in this book took place many centuries before that time. Professor S.M. Russell believes that the eclipse described in the book may refer to the event that happened on 29 January 1137 BC (-1136).

== 9 October 425 BC ==
When eclipses were not well understood, they were sometimes associated with unnatural forces. Witches from the Greek region of Thessaly claimed the ability to extinguish the Moon's light and draw it down from the sky. In his famous comedy The Clouds (419 BC), Aristophanes describes the eclipse that took place two years prior to that.

the moon deserted her course and the sun at once veiled his beam threatening, no longer to give you light, if Cleon became general...

== 28 August 413 BC ==
This eclipse happened during the Second Battle of Syracuse. Just as the Athenians were preparing to sail home, there was a lunar eclipse, and Nicias, described by Thucydides as a particularly superstitious man, asked the priests what he should do. The priests suggested the Athenians wait for another 27 days, and Nicias agreed. The Syracusans took advantage of this, and 76 of their ships attacked 86 Athenian ships in the harbor. The Athenians were defeated and Eurymedon was killed. Many of the ships were pushed up on to the shore, where Gylippus was waiting. He killed some of the crews and captured 18 beached ships, but a force of Athenians and Etruscans forced Gylippus back. Plutarch described this eclipse and the superstitious response:

And when all were in readiness, and none of the enemy had observed them, not expecting such a thing, the moon was eclipsed in the night, to the great fright of Nicias and others, who, for want of experience, or out of superstition, felt alarm at such appearances.

== 22 May 1453 ==
This partial lunar eclipse was seen during the Fall of Constantinople (the capture of the capital of the Byzantine Empire), during the siege that lasted from Thursday, 5 April 1453 until Tuesday, 29 May 1453), after which the city fell to the Ottomans. The lunar eclipse was considered to be fulfilling a prophecy for the city's demise. It is said a blood moon took place during the eclipse.

== 1 March 1504 ==
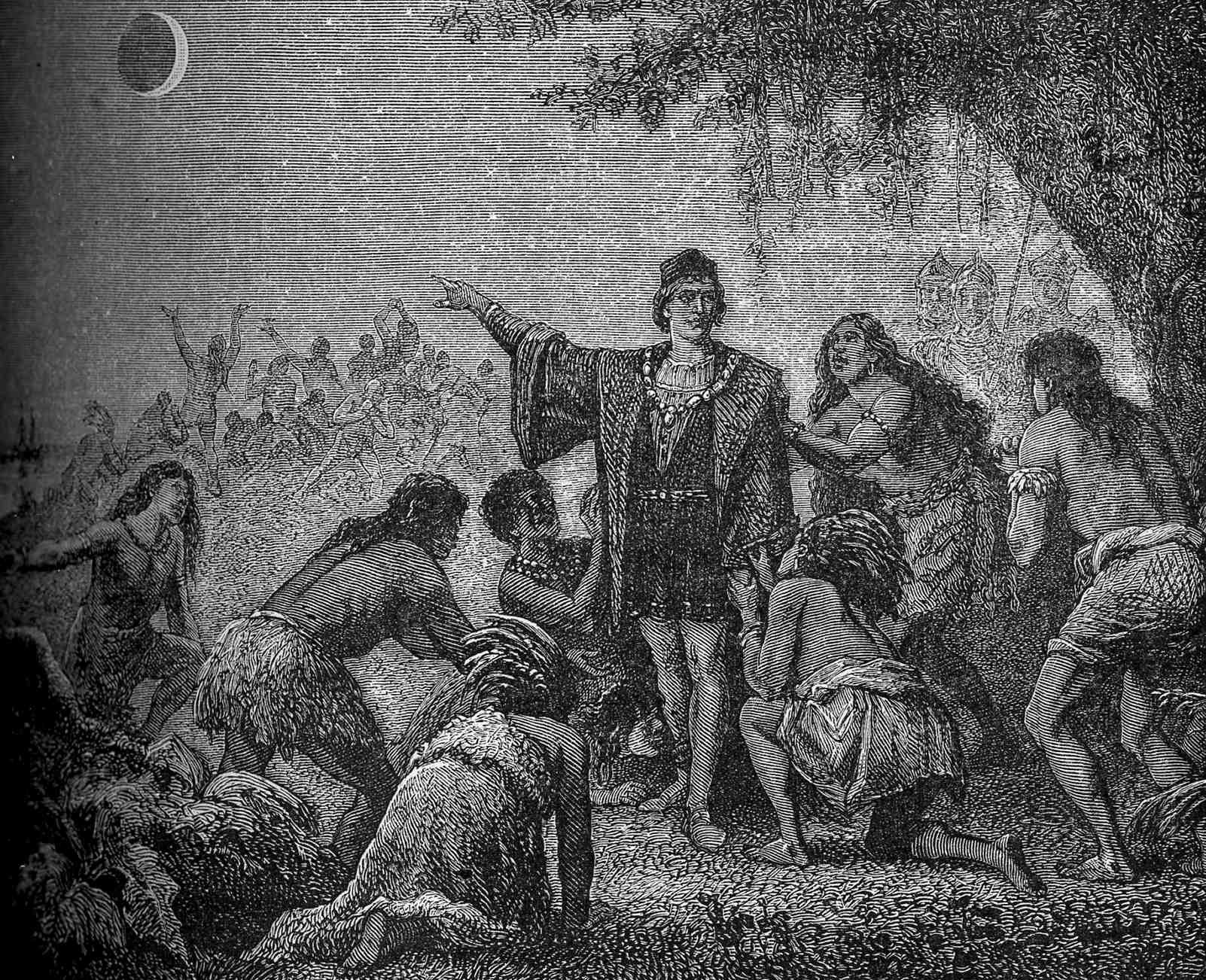
Illustration of Columbus using a lunar eclipse to impress the Indigenous people of Jamaica. From Astronomie Populaire 1879, p 231 fig. 86

On 30 June 1503, Christopher Columbus beached his two last caravels and was stranded in Jamaica. The indigenous people of the island welcomed Columbus and his crew and fed them, but Columbus' sailors cheated and stole from the natives. After six months, the natives halted the food supply.

Columbus had on board an almanac authored by Regiomontanus of astronomical tables covering the years 1475–1506; upon consulting the book, he noticed the date and the time of an upcoming lunar eclipse. He was able to use this information to his advantage. He requested a meeting for that day with the Cacique, and told him that his god was angry with the local people's treatment of Columbus and his men. Columbus said his god would provide a clear sign of his displeasure by making the rising full moon appear "inflamed with wrath".

The lunar eclipse and the red Moon appeared on schedule, and the indigenous people were impressed and frightened. The son of Columbus, Ferdinand, wrote that the people:

with great howling and lamentation came running from every direction to the ships laden with provisions, praying to the Admiral to intercede with his god on their behalf...

Columbus timed the eclipse with his hourglass, and shortly before the totality ended after 48 minutes, he told the frightened indigenous people that they were going to be forgiven. When the Moon started to reappear from the shadow of the Earth, he told them that his god had pardoned them.

=== Fictionalized variations ===
In 1885, H. Rider Haggard used an altered version of the real story of the rescue of Columbus in his novel, King Solomon's Mines. In that novel, Allan Quatermain and his fellow Englishmen use their foreknowledge of a solar eclipse to claim that they will black out the Sun as proof of their powers, and save captive girls from an unjust death sentence.

In 1889, Mark Twain used a similar plot device in his novel, A Connecticut Yankee in King Arthur's Court. In that novel, Hank Morgan, a 19th-century resident of Hartford, Connecticut, after a blow to the head, awakens to find himself inexplicably transported back in time to early medieval England at the time of the legendary King Arthur. When Morgan is about to be burned at the stake, he pretends to conjure a solar eclipse that he knew was about to happen; this prediction saves Morgan's life.

Another novel that used a solar-eclipse scene modeled after Columbus' lunar eclipse was Bolesław Prus' 1895 historical novel, Pharaoh.

A similar plot also features in The Adventures of Tintin 1949 comic Prisoners of the Sun.

== 6 April 1670 ==
The partial lunar eclipse of 6 April 1670 occurred on Easter Sunday in the Gregorian calendar, the first such case for that calendar and the only one until the April 1819 lunar eclipse.

== 10 December 1685 ==
The longest penumbra-to-penumbra lunar eclipse between the years 1000 and 3000, with a 379.11 minute duration.

== 26 December 1852 ==
The last eclipse to occur on Christmas Day in some parts of the world, which had not happened since 25 December 1806, and will not happen again until 24 December 2159 (UTC).

== 15 July 1916 ==
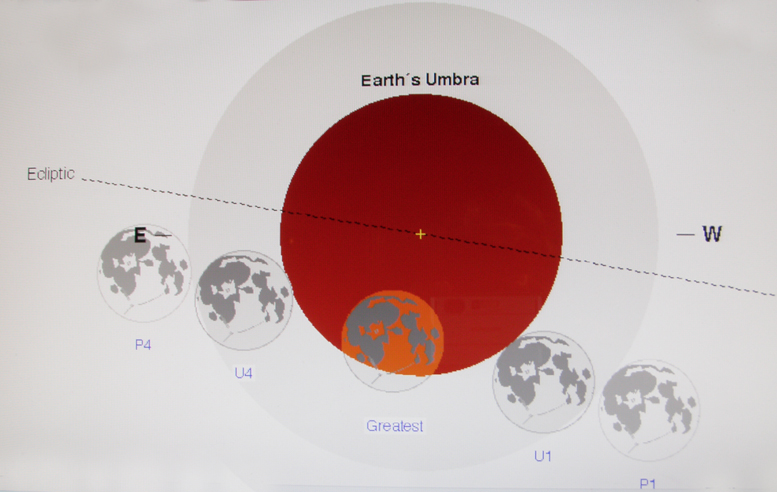
The path of the lunar eclipse on 15 July 1916

The Ross Sea party was a component of Sir Ernest Shackleton's Imperial Trans-Antarctic Expedition of 1914–1917. Five men were stranded not far away from Cape Evans. There was sea ice between them and the relative safety of the hut on Cape Evans. On 8 May two of the men, Aeneas Mackintosh and Victor Hayward, decided to make an attempt to reach the hut. Soon after they set out a blizzard hit. When the weather cleared up, the remaining men tried to look for them, but realized that the ice was far too thin to cross, and that their friends had been lost. Now they knew that they should wait for a thicker ice and for the full moon to attempt the crossing. Having the full moon was essential, because during polar night the Moon is the only source of natural light other than the extremely dim light of the stars.

The weather did not cooperate during the full moon of June, but on 15 July, everything seemed to be just right: calm weather, thick ice, clear skies and a full moon. The men started their journey in the morning. When the Moon rose, however, the men were surprised to find it was about to be eclipsed. Ernest Wild wrote later:

"I thought we were going to be left in darkness but a very little bit of the rim remained to light us..."

Although the eclipse continued for a few hours, the men were fortunate because it was only a partial eclipse. They reached Cape Evans later on the same day.

== See also ==
- Lunar eclipses by century
