= September 2024 lunar eclipse =

Partial lunar eclipse of September 17th, 2024

- Partial eclipse
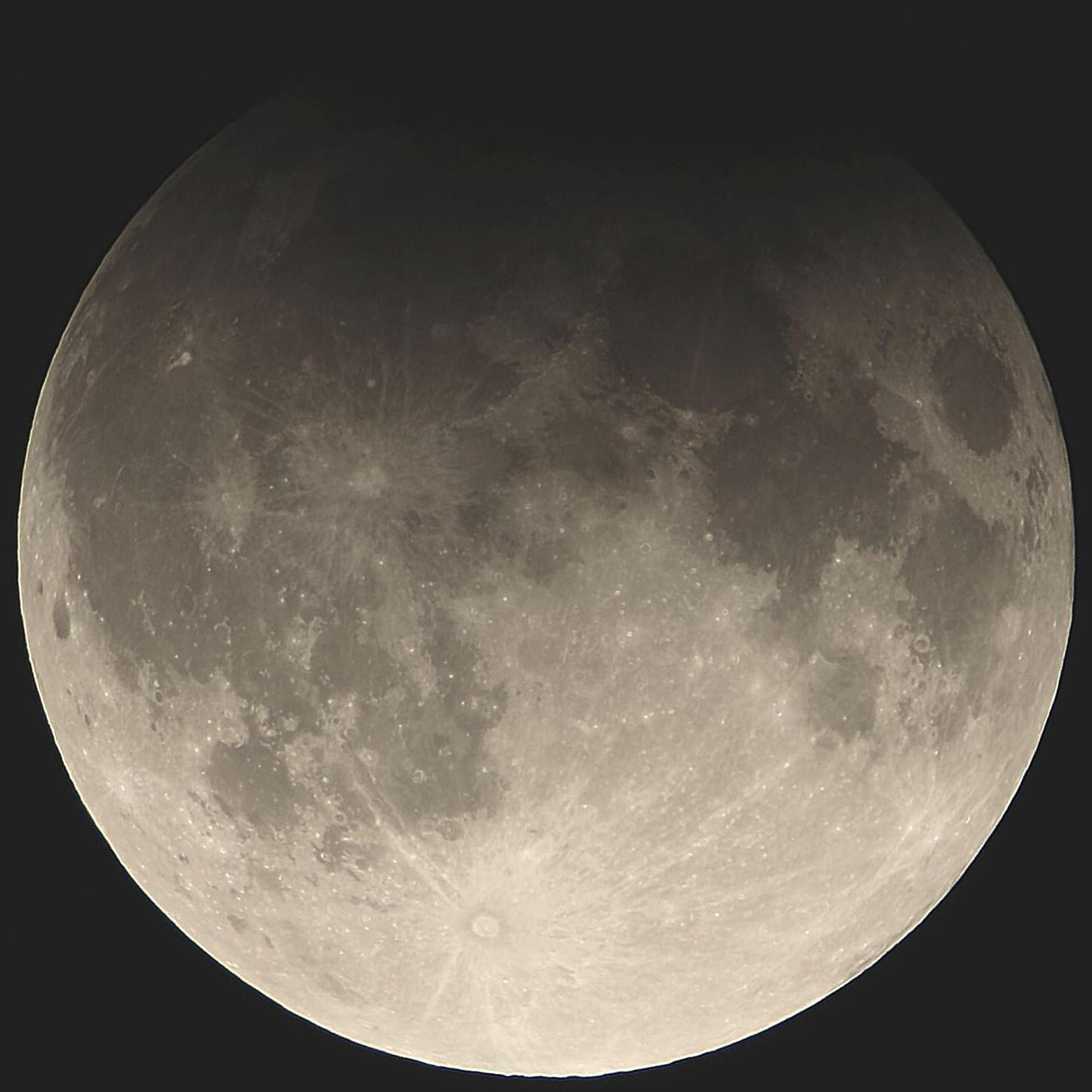
- View from North St. Paul, Minnesota at maximum eclipse, 2:44 UTC
- Date: September 18, 2024
- Gamma: −0.9792
- Magnitude: 0.0869
- Saros cycle: 118 (52 of 73)
- Partiality: 63 minutes, 40 seconds
- Penumbral: 246 minutes, 56 seconds
Contacts (UTC)
- P1: 00:41:00
- U1: 02:12:45
- Greatest: 02:44:16
- U4: 03:16:24
- P4: 04:47:56

External videos
- timelapse video from Spain
- video from Moscow, Russia

A partial lunar eclipse occurred at the Moon's ascending node of orbit on Wednesday, September 18, 2024, with an umbral magnitude of 0.0869. A lunar eclipse occurs when the Moon moves into the Earth's shadow, causing the Moon to be darkened. A partial lunar eclipse occurs when one part of the Moon is in the Earth's umbra, while the other part is in the Earth's penumbra. Unlike a solar eclipse, which can only be viewed from a relatively small area of the world, a lunar eclipse may be viewed from anywhere on the night side of Earth. Occurring about 0.4 days before perigee (13:26 UTC, September 18), the Moon's apparent diameter was larger than average, resulting in a supermoon.

This eclipse was the final partial lunar eclipse of Lunar Saros 118.

== Visibility ==
The eclipse was completely visible over North and South America, west Africa, and western Europe, seen rising over western North America and the eastern Pacific Ocean and setting over east Africa, eastern Europe, and west and central Asia.

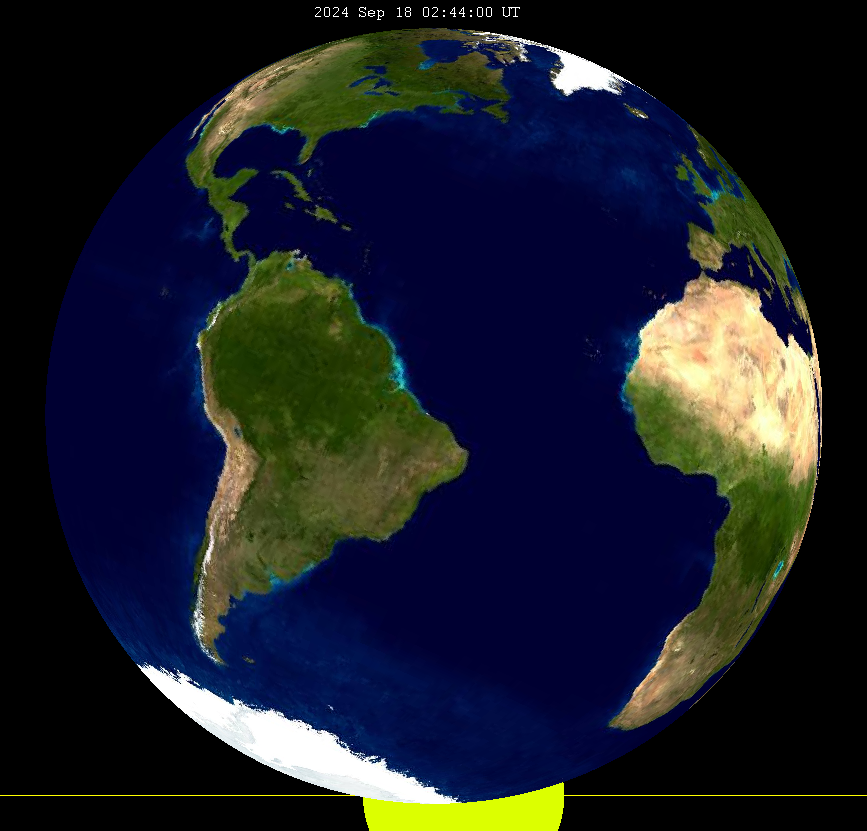
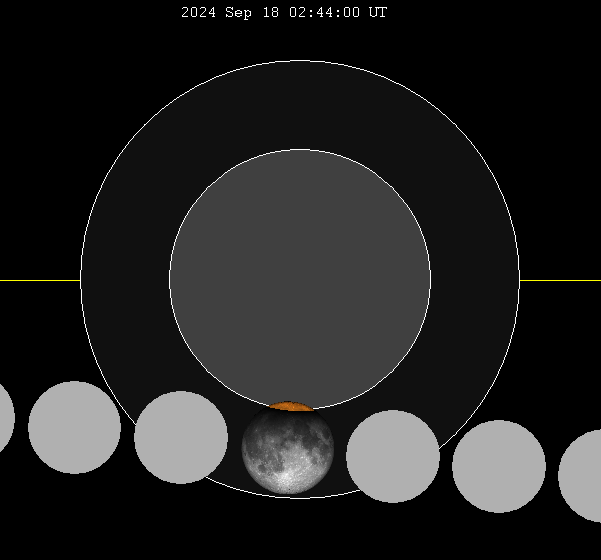
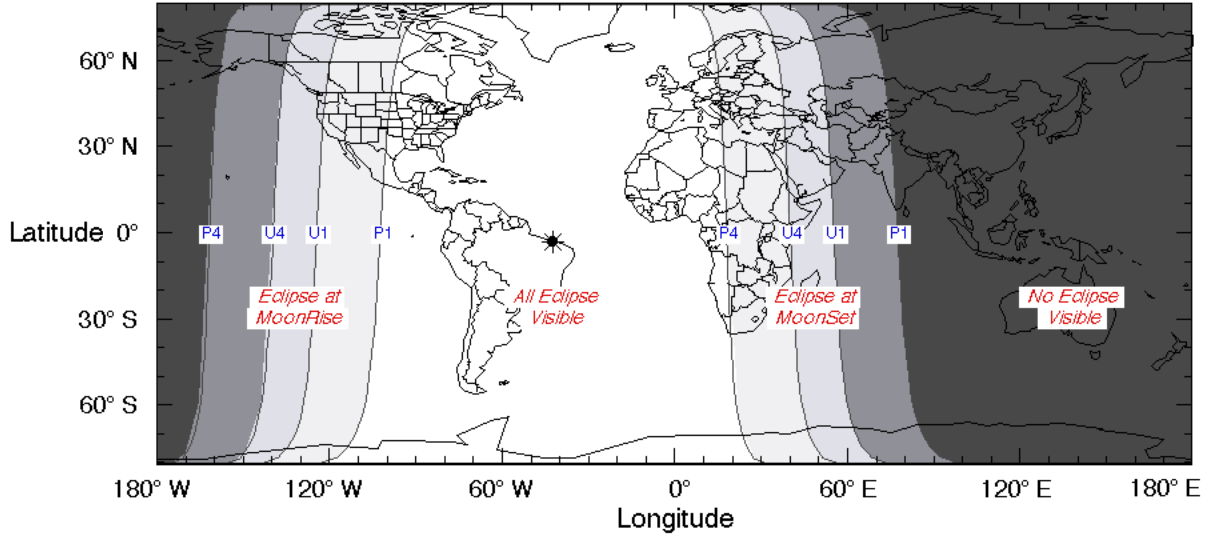
Visibility map

== Gallery ==
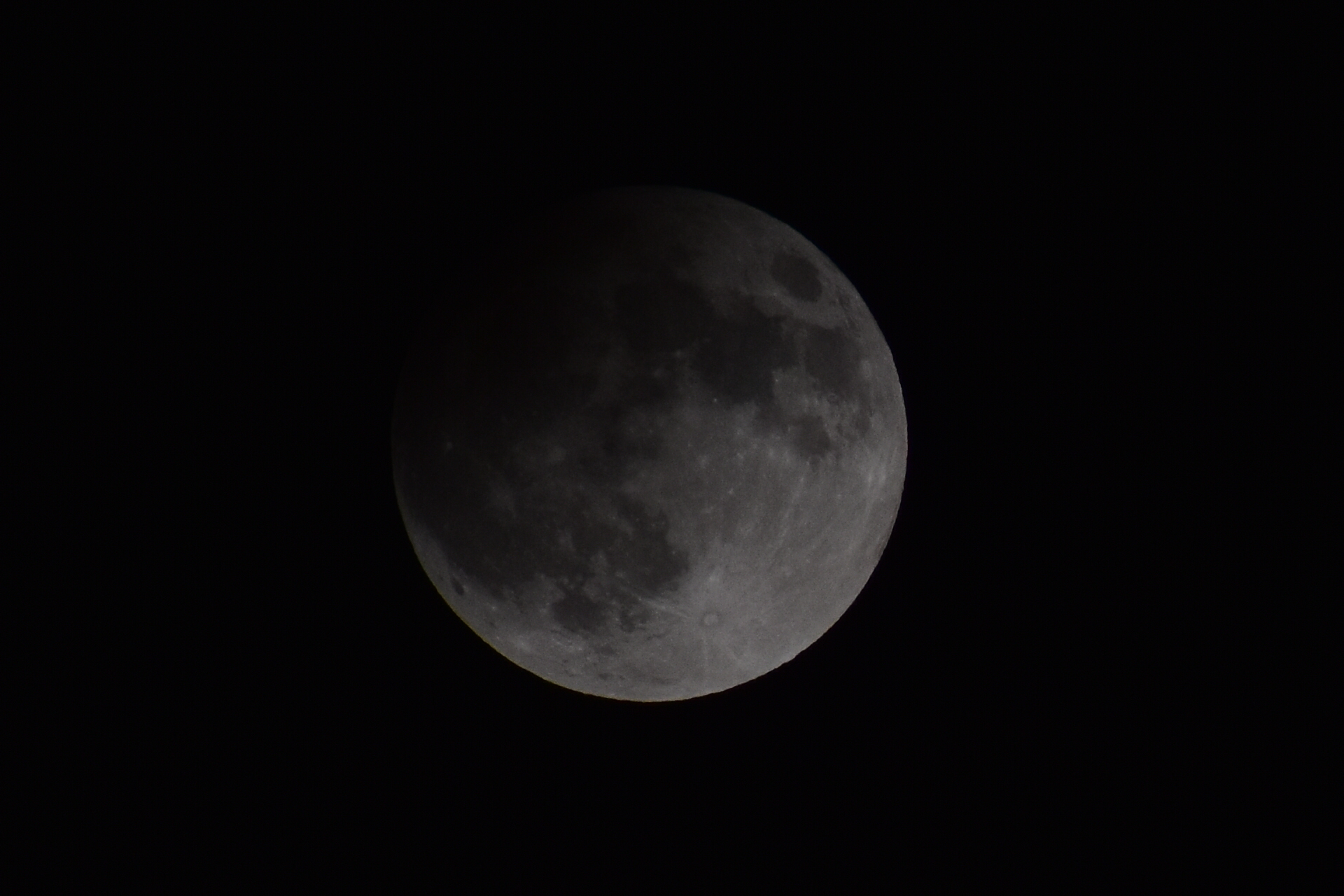
Lakeland, Florida, 2:11 UTC

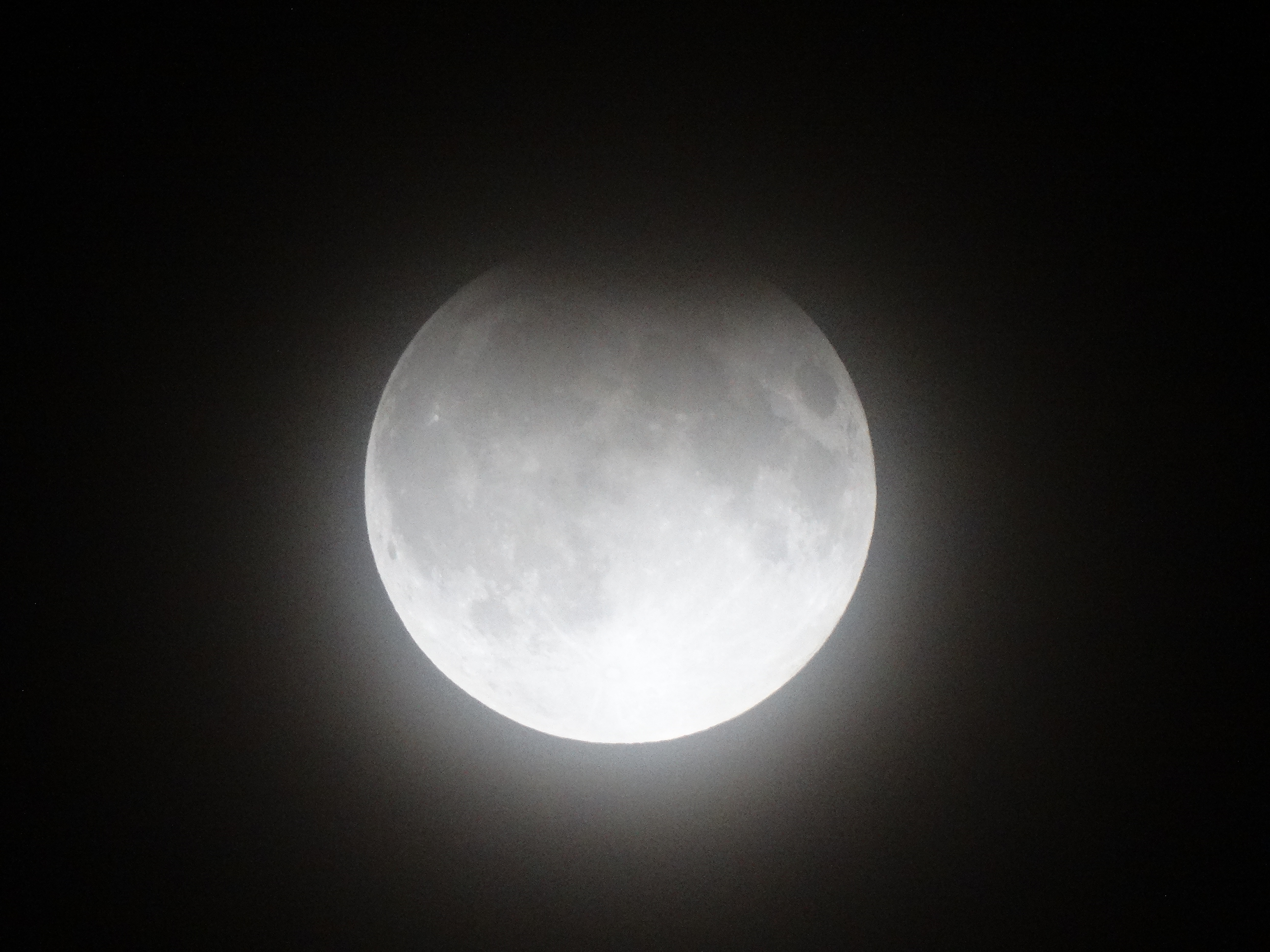
Cleveland, Ohio, 2:16 UTC

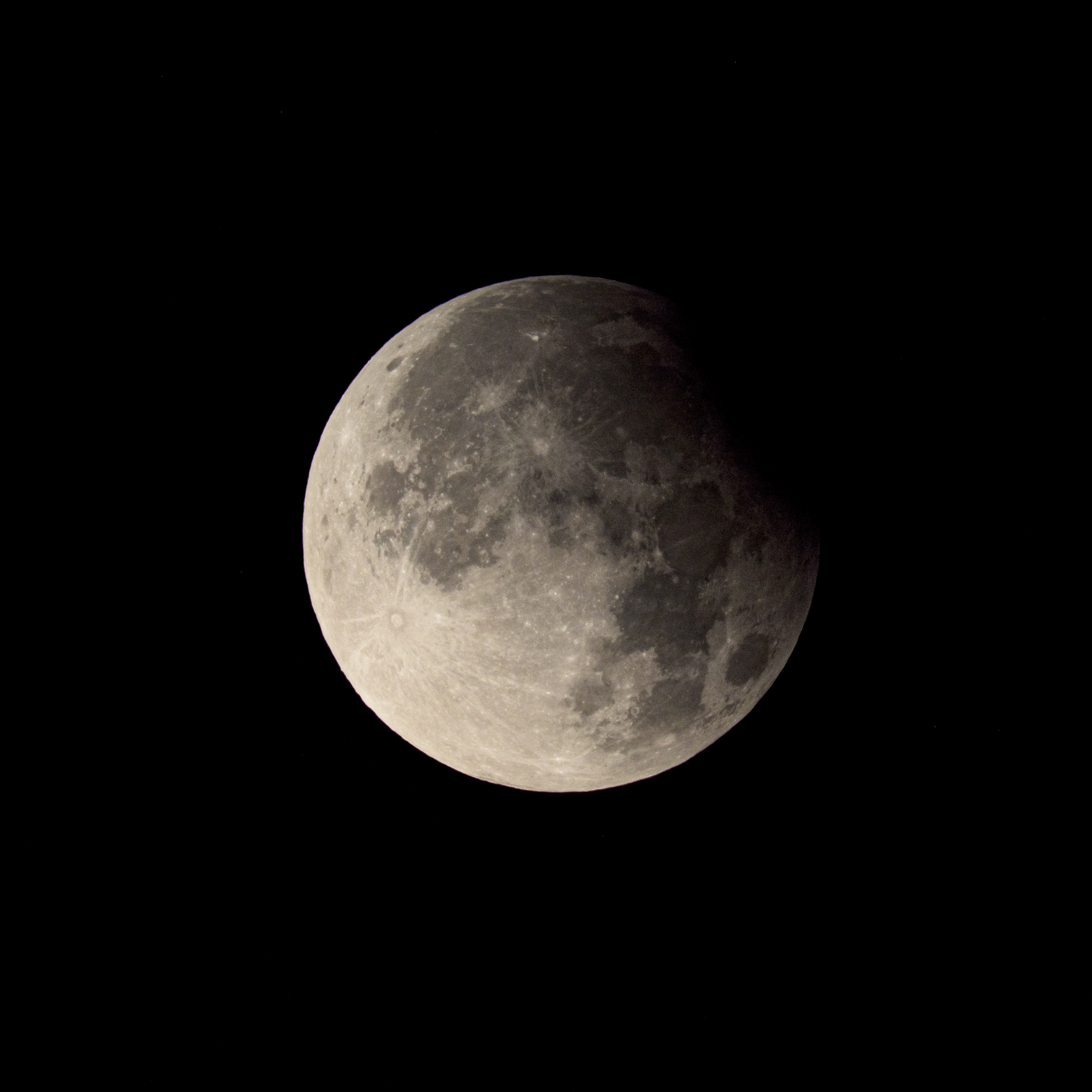
Leipzig, Germany, 2:41 UTC

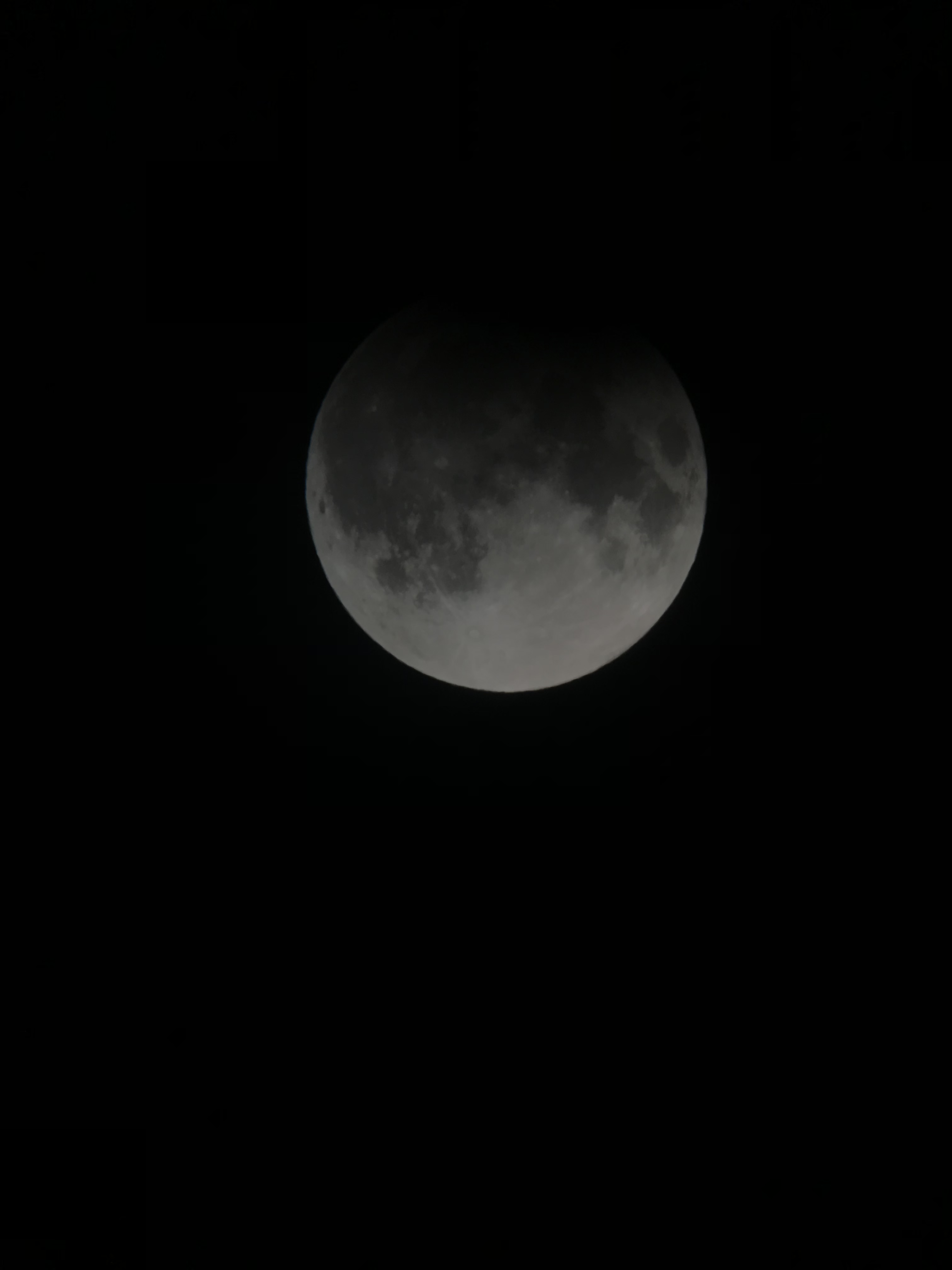
Halifax, Nova Scotia, 2:44 UTC

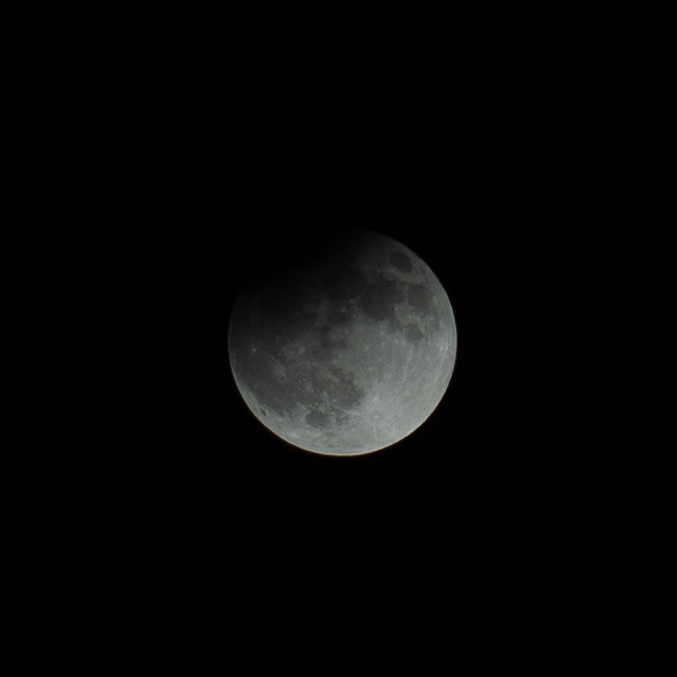
Dallas, Texas, 2:44 UTC

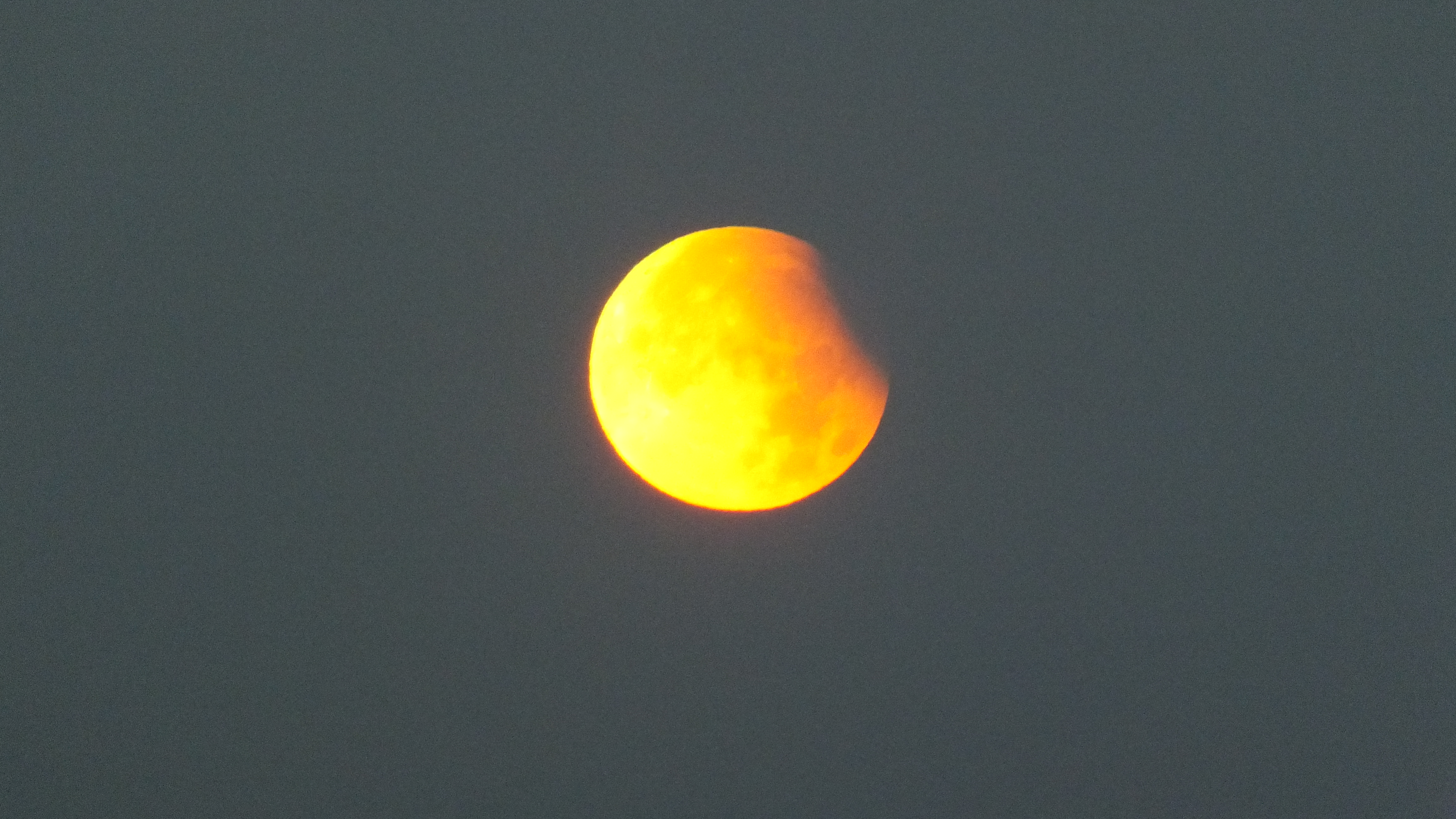
Moscow, Russia, 2:45 UTC

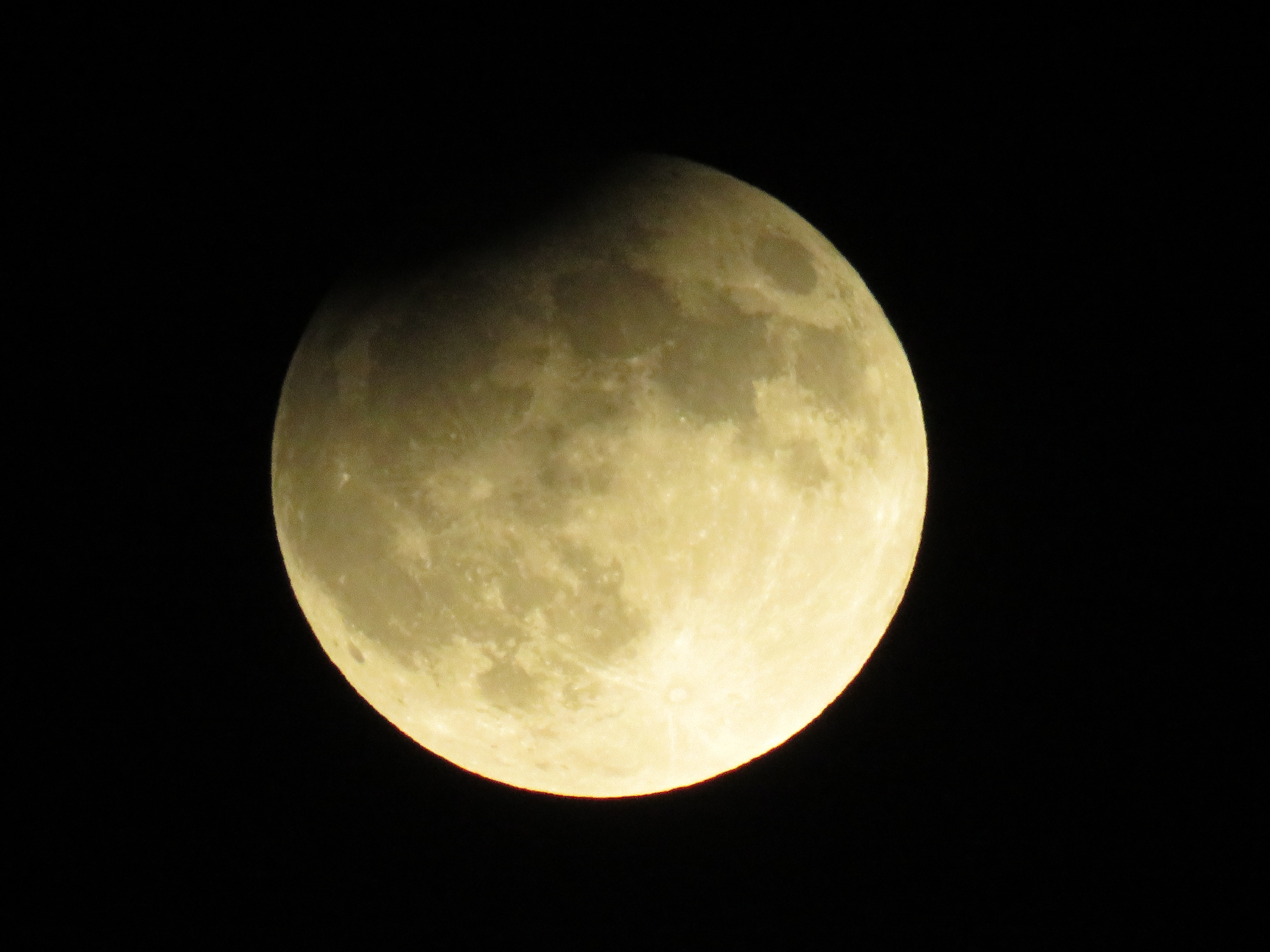
Santa Ana, California, 2:46 UTC

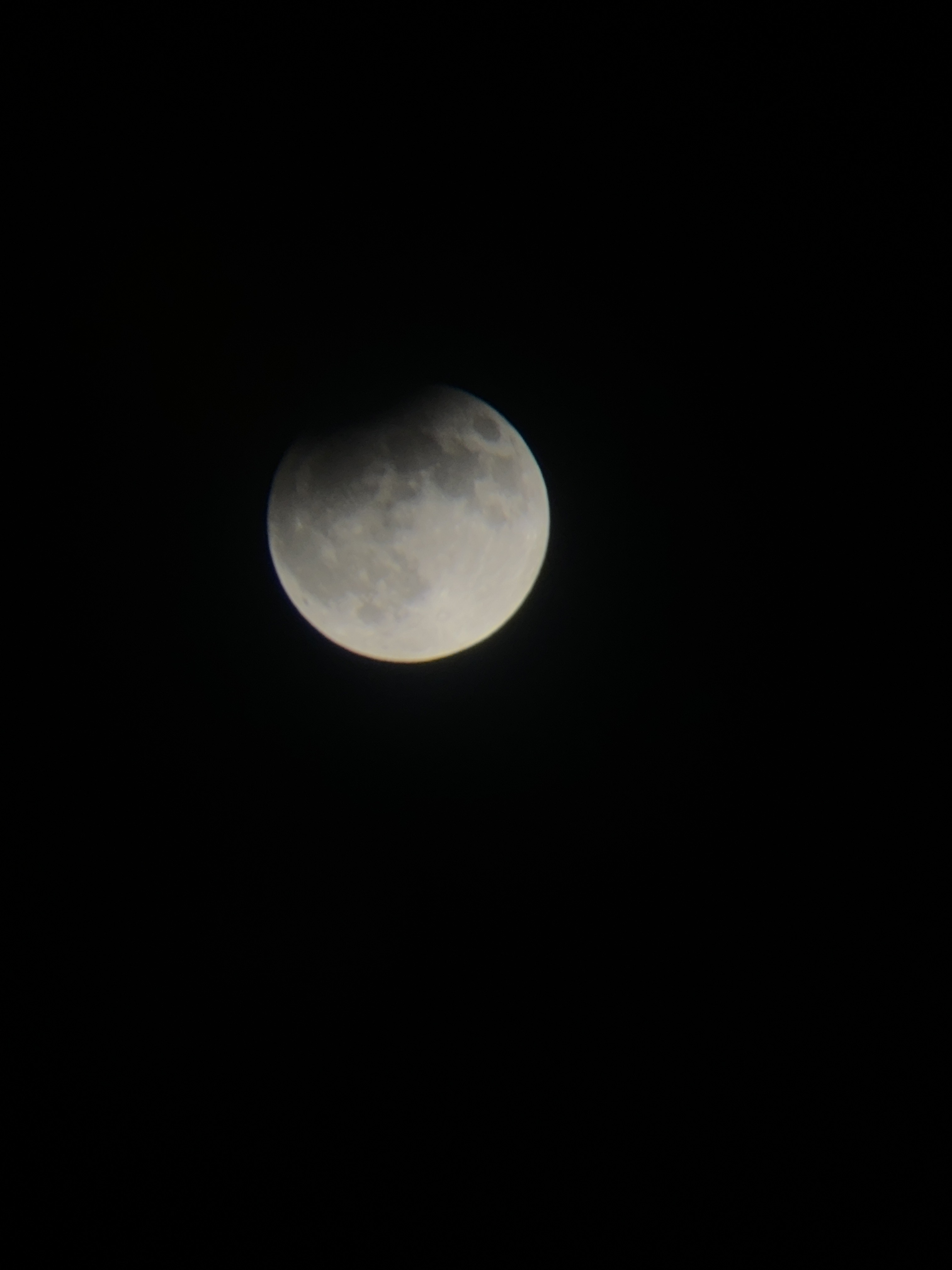
Mexicali, Mexico, 2:49 UTC

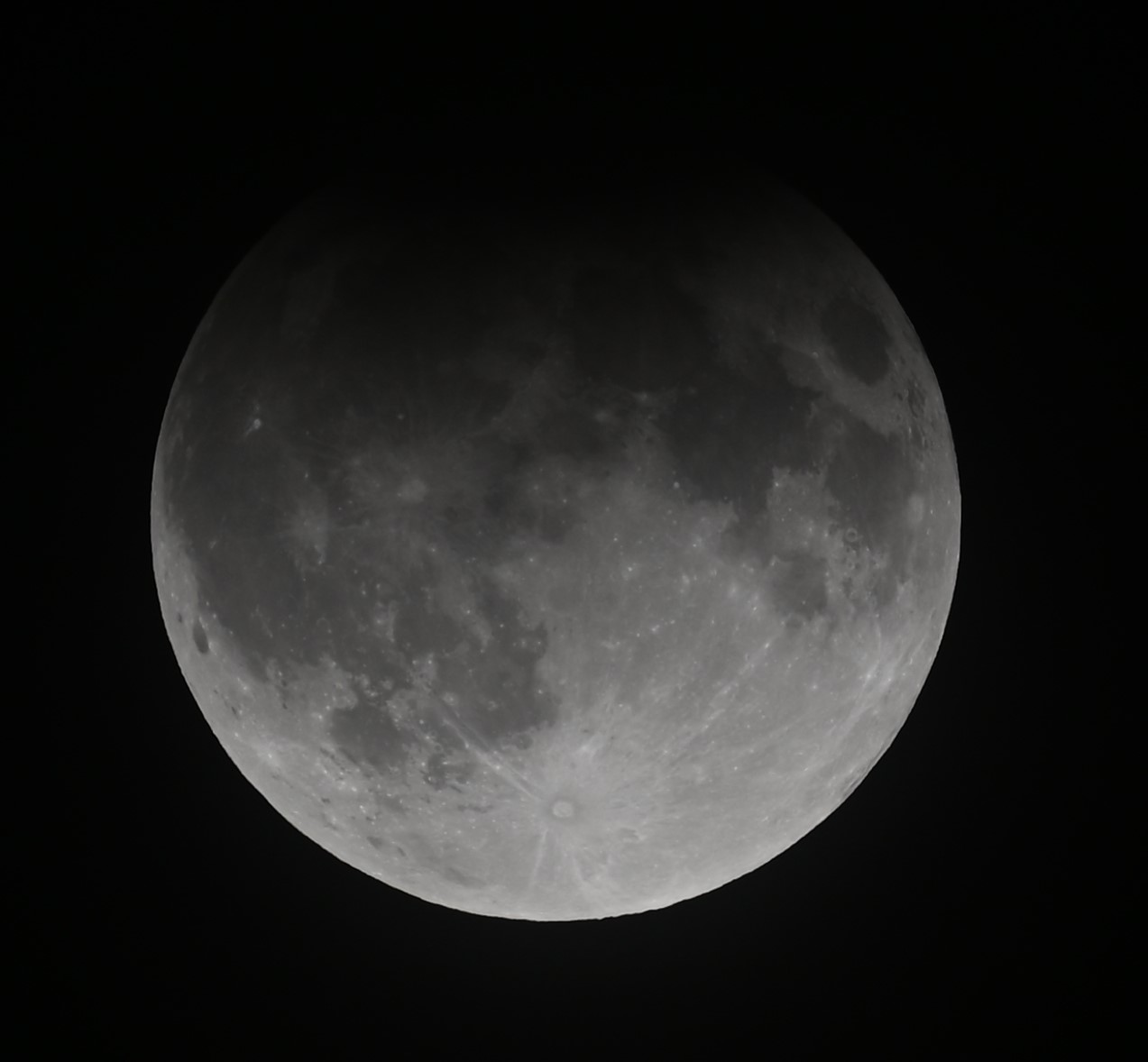
Norwalk, Ohio, 2:49 UTC

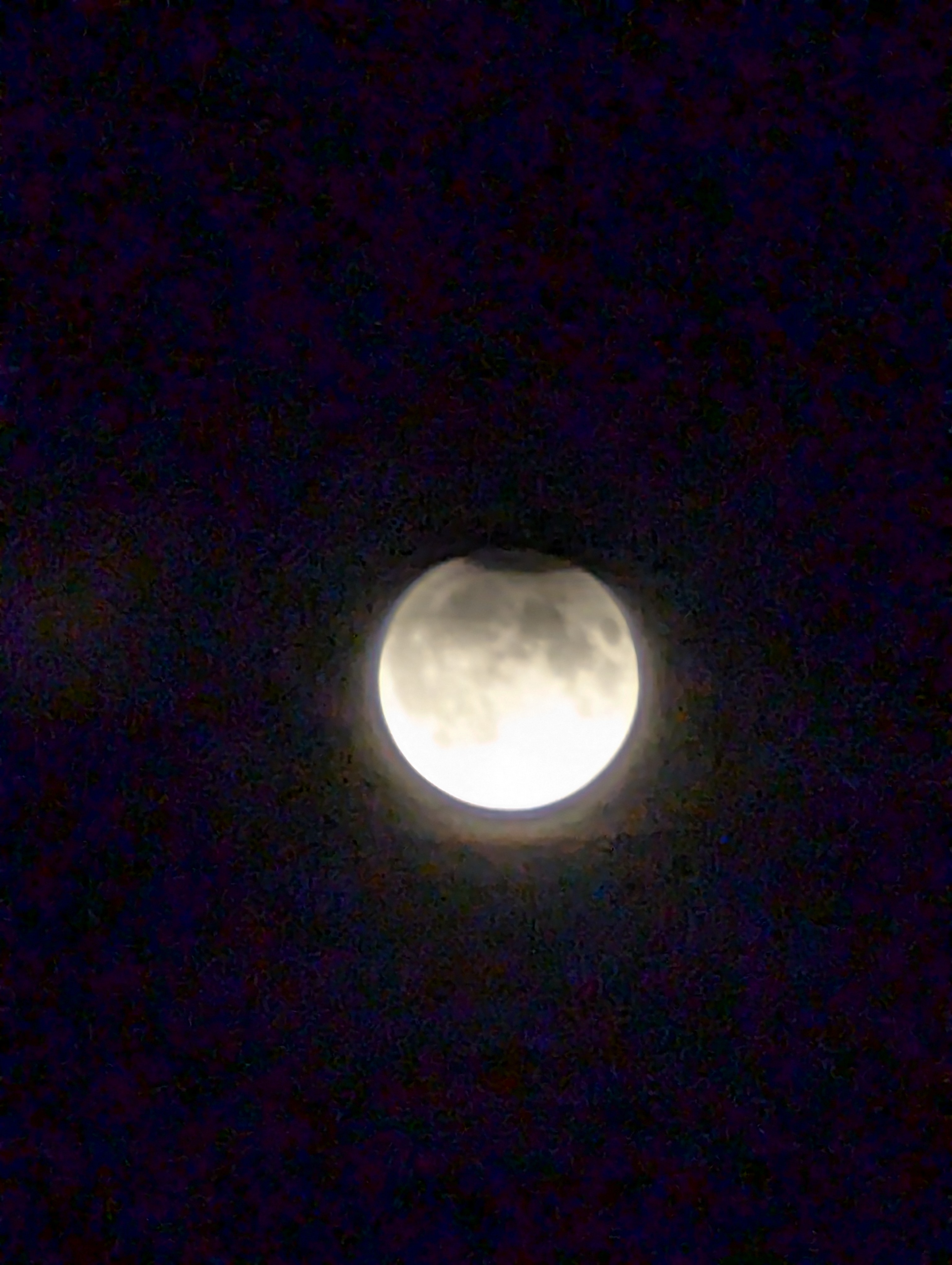
Highlands East, Ontario, 2:50 UTC

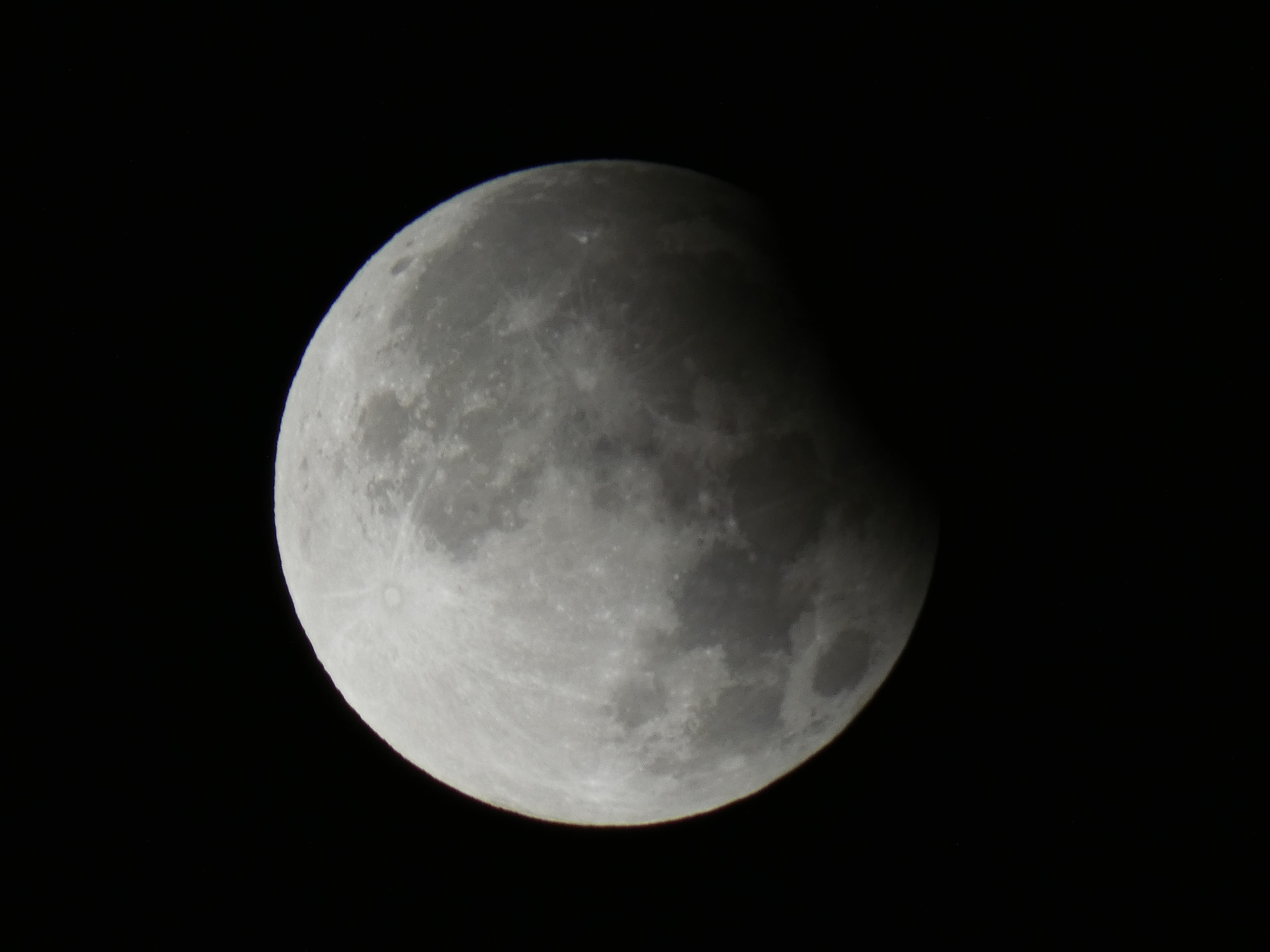
Logroño, Spain, 2:56 UTC

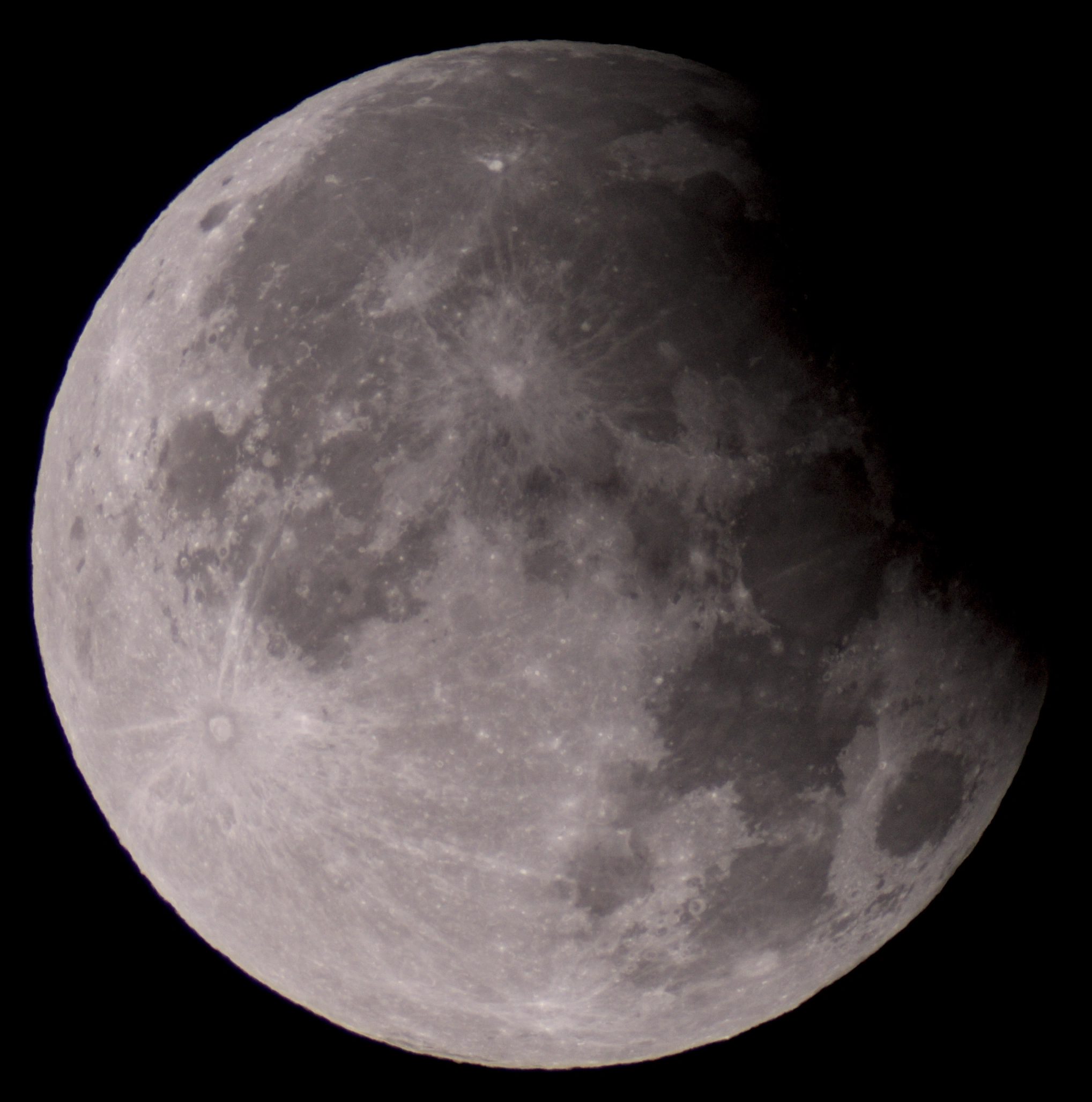
Rabka-Zdroj, Poland, 2:56 UTC

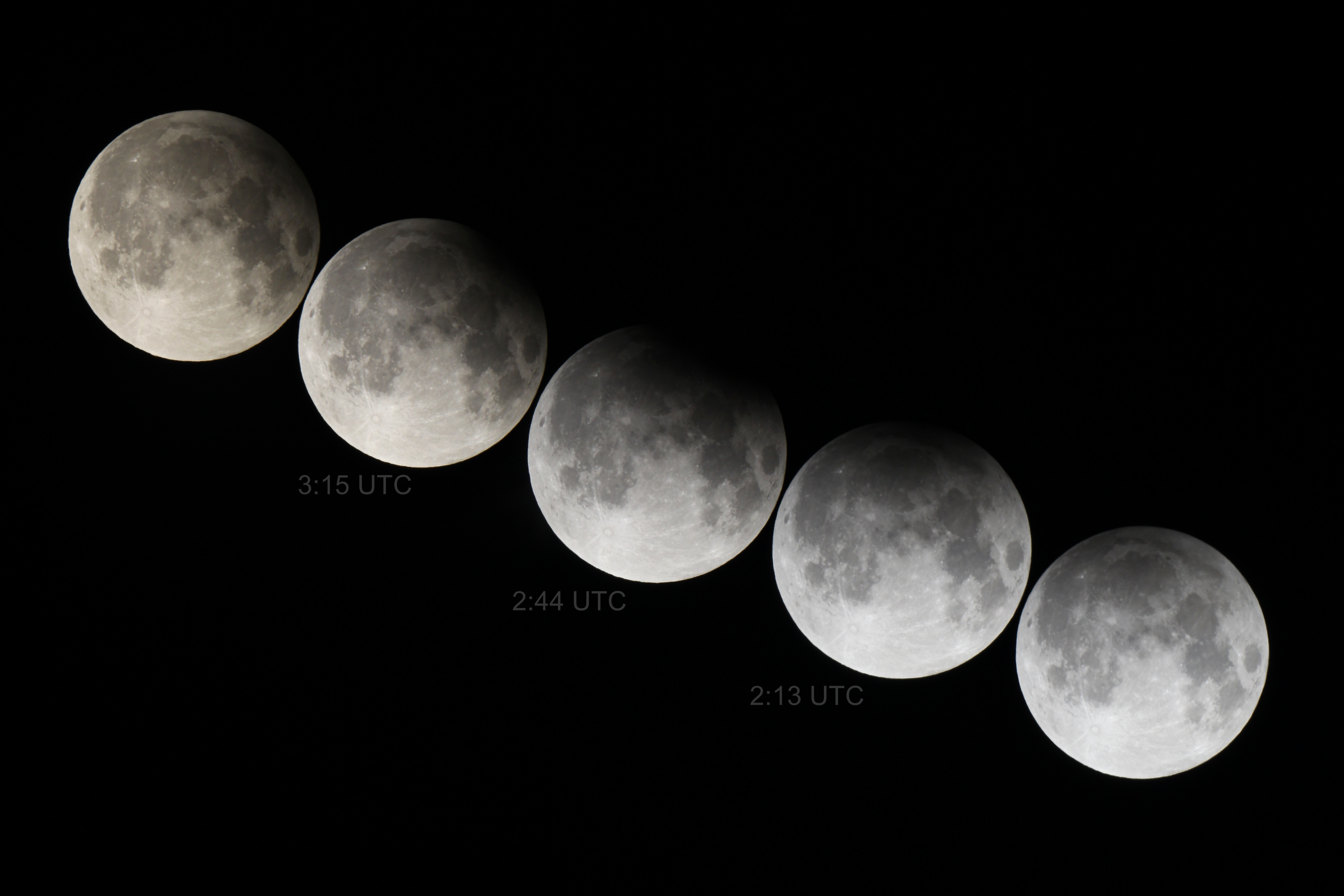
Eclipse progression from Oria, Italy

== Eclipse details ==
Shown below is a table displaying details about this particular lunar eclipse. It describes various parameters pertaining to this eclipse.

September 18, 2024 Lunar Eclipse Parameters
Parameter	Value
Penumbral Magnitude	1.03922
Umbral Magnitude	0.08685
Gamma	−0.97920
Sun Right Ascension	11^{h} 44^{m} 09.7^{s}
Sun Declination	+01° 42′ 52.9″
Sun Semi-Diameter	15′ 55.1″
Sun Equatorial Horizontal Parallax	08.8″
Moon Right Ascension	23^{h} 46^{m} 06.1^{s}
Moon Declination	−02° 35′ 26.7″
Moon Semi-Diameter	16′ 42.8″
Moon Equatorial Horizontal Parallax	1° 01′ 20.4″
ΔT	69.1 s

== Eclipse season ==
This eclipse is part of an eclipse season, a period, roughly every six months, when eclipses occur. Only two (or occasionally three) eclipse seasons occur each year, and each season lasts about 35 days and repeats just short of six months (173 days) later; thus two full eclipse seasons always occur each year. Either two or three eclipses happen each eclipse season. In the sequence below, each eclipse is separated by a fortnight.

Eclipse season of September–October 2024
September 18 Ascending node (full moon)	October 2 Descending node (new moon)
Partial lunar eclipse Lunar Saros 118	Annular solar eclipse Solar Saros 144

== Related eclipses ==
=== Eclipses in 2024 ===
- A penumbral lunar eclipse on March 25.
- A total solar eclipse on April 8.
- A partial lunar eclipse on September 18.
- An annular solar eclipse on October 2.

=== Metonic ===
- Preceded by: Lunar eclipse of November 30, 2020
- Followed by: Lunar eclipse of July 6, 2028

=== Tzolkinex ===
- Preceded by: Lunar eclipse of August 7, 2017
- Followed by: Lunar eclipse of October 30, 2031

=== Half-Saros ===
- Preceded by: Solar eclipse of September 13, 2015
- Followed by: Solar eclipse of September 23, 2033

=== Tritos ===
- Preceded by: Lunar eclipse of October 18, 2013
- Followed by: Lunar eclipse of August 19, 2035

=== Lunar Saros 118 ===
- Preceded by: Lunar eclipse of September 7, 2006
- Followed by: Lunar eclipse of September 29, 2042

=== Inex ===
- Preceded by: Lunar eclipse of October 8, 1995
- Followed by: Lunar eclipse of August 29, 2053

=== Triad ===
- Preceded by: Lunar eclipse of November 18, 1937
- Followed by: Lunar eclipse of July 21, 2111

=== Lunar eclipses of 2024–2027 ===
This eclipse is a member of a semester series. An eclipse in a semester series of lunar eclipses repeats approximately every 177 days and 4 hours (a semester) at alternating nodes of the Moon's orbit.

The penumbral lunar eclipse on July 18, 2027 occurs in the next lunar year eclipse set.

Lunar eclipse series sets from 2024 to 2027
Descending node				Ascending node			
Saros	Date Viewing	Type Chart	Gamma	Saros	Date Viewing	Type Chart	Gamma
113	2024 Mar 25	Penumbral	1.0610	118	2024 Sep 18	Partial	−0.9792
123	2025 Mar 14	Total	0.3485	128	2025 Sep 07	Total	−0.2752
133	2026 Mar 03	Total	−0.3765	138	2026 Aug 28	Partial	0.4964
143	2027 Feb 20	Penumbral	−1.0480	148	2027 Aug 17	Penumbral	1.2797

=== Saros 118 ===
This eclipse is a part of Saros series 118, repeating every 18 years, 11 days, and containing 73 events. The series started with a penumbral lunar eclipse on March 2, 1105. It contains partial eclipses from June 8, 1267 through August 12, 1375; total eclipses from August 22, 1393 through June 22, 1880; and a second set of partial eclipses from July 3, 1898 through September 18, 2024. The series ends at member 73 as a penumbral eclipse on May 7, 2403.

The longest duration of totality was produced by member 37 at 99 minutes, 22 seconds on April 7, 1754. All eclipses in this series occur at the Moon’s ascending node of orbit.

Greatest	First			
The greatest eclipse of the series occurred on 1754 Apr 07, lasting 99 minutes, 22 seconds.	Penumbral	Partial	Total	Central
The greatest eclipse of the series occurred on 1754 Apr 07, lasting 99 minutes, 22 seconds.	1105 Mar 02	1267 Jun 08	1393 Aug 22	1465 Oct 04
The greatest eclipse of the series occurred on 1754 Apr 07, lasting 99 minutes, 22 seconds.	Last			
The greatest eclipse of the series occurred on 1754 Apr 07, lasting 99 minutes, 22 seconds.	Central	Total	Partial	Penumbral
The greatest eclipse of the series occurred on 1754 Apr 07, lasting 99 minutes, 22 seconds.	1826 May 21	1880 Jun 22	2024 Sep 18	2403 May 07

Eclipses are tabulated in three columns; every third eclipse in the same column is one exeligmos apart, so they all cast shadows over approximately the same parts of the Earth.

Series members 40–61 occur between 1801 and 2200:
40	41	42
1808 May 10	1826 May 21	1844 May 31
43	44	45
1862 Jun 12	1880 Jun 22	1898 Jul 03
46	47	48
1916 Jul 15	1934 Jul 26	1952 Aug 05
49	50	51
1970 Aug 17	1988 Aug 27	2006 Sep 07
52	53	54
2024 Sep 18	2042 Sep 29	2060 Oct 09
55	56	57
2078 Oct 21	2096 Oct 31	2114 Nov 12
58	59	60
2132 Nov 23	2150 Dec 04	2168 Dec 14
61
2186 Dec 26

=== Tritos series ===
This eclipse is a part of a tritos cycle, repeating at alternating nodes every 135 synodic months (≈ 3986.63 days, or 11 years minus 1 month). Their appearance and longitude are irregular due to a lack of synchronization with the anomalistic month (period of perigee), but groupings of 3 tritos cycles (≈ 33 years minus 3 months) come close (≈ 434.044 anomalistic months), so eclipses are similar in these groupings.

Series members between 1817 and 2200
1817 May 01 (Saros 99)	1828 Mar 31 (Saros 100)	1839 Feb 28 (Saros 101)	1850 Jan 28 (Saros 102)	1860 Dec 28 (Saros 103)
		1893 Sep 25 (Saros 106)		1915 Jul 26 (Saros 108)
1926 Jun 25 (Saros 109)	1937 May 25 (Saros 110)	1948 Apr 23 (Saros 111)	1959 Mar 24 (Saros 112)	1970 Feb 21 (Saros 113)
1981 Jan 20 (Saros 114)	1991 Dec 21 (Saros 115)	2002 Nov 20 (Saros 116)	2013 Oct 18 (Saros 117)	2024 Sep 18 (Saros 118)
2035 Aug 19 (Saros 119)	2046 Jul 18 (Saros 120)	2057 Jun 17 (Saros 121)	2068 May 17 (Saros 122)	2079 Apr 16 (Saros 123)
2090 Mar 15 (Saros 124)	2101 Feb 14 (Saros 125)	2112 Jan 14 (Saros 126)	2122 Dec 13 (Saros 127)	2133 Nov 12 (Saros 128)
2144 Oct 11 (Saros 129)	2155 Sep 11 (Saros 130)	2166 Aug 11 (Saros 131)	2177 Jul 11 (Saros 132)	2188 Jun 09 (Saros 133)
2199 May 10 (Saros 134)

=== Inex series ===
This eclipse is a part of the long period inex cycle, repeating at alternating nodes, every 358 synodic months (≈ 10,571.95 days, or 29 years minus 20 days). Their appearance and longitude are irregular due to a lack of synchronization with the anomalistic month (period of perigee). However, groupings of 3 inex cycles (≈ 87 years minus 2 months) comes close (≈ 1,151.02 anomalistic months), so eclipses are similar in these groupings.

Series members between 1801 and 2200
1822 Feb 06 (Saros 111)	1851 Jan 17 (Saros 112)	1879 Dec 28 (Saros 113)
1908 Dec 07 (Saros 114)	1937 Nov 18 (Saros 115)	1966 Oct 29 (Saros 116)
1995 Oct 08 (Saros 117)	2024 Sep 18 (Saros 118)	2053 Aug 29 (Saros 119)
2082 Aug 08 (Saros 120)	2111 Jul 21 (Saros 121)	2140 Jun 30 (Saros 122)
2169 Jun 09 (Saros 123)	2198 May 20 (Saros 124)	

=== Half-Saros cycle ===
A lunar eclipse will precede and follow by solar eclipses by 9 years and 5.5 days (a half saros). This lunar eclipse is related to two partial solar eclipses of Solar Saros 125.

September 13, 2015	September 23, 2033

== See also ==
- List of lunar eclipses and List of 21st-century lunar eclipses
