= August 1952 lunar eclipse =

Partial lunar eclipse August 5, 1952

- Partial eclipse
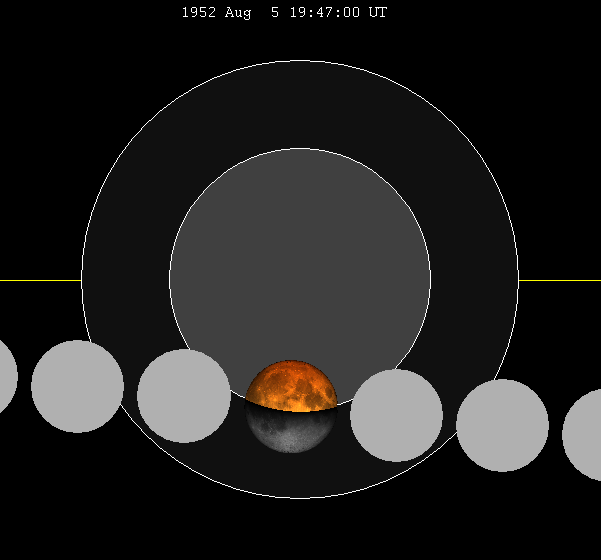
- The Moon's hourly motion shown right to left
- Date: August 5, 1952
- Gamma: −0.7384
- Magnitude: 0.5318
- Saros cycle: 118 (48 of 74)
- Partiality: 147 minutes, 10 seconds
- Penumbral: 278 minutes, 22 seconds
Contacts (UTC)
- P1: 17:28:13
- U1: 18:33:49
- Greatest: 19:47:25
- U4: 21:01:00
- P4: 22:06:35

A partial lunar eclipse occurred at the Moon’s ascending node of orbit on Tuesday, August 5, 1952, with an umbral magnitude of 0.5318. A lunar eclipse occurs when the Moon moves into the Earth's shadow, causing the Moon to be darkened. A partial lunar eclipse occurs when one part of the Moon is in the Earth's umbra, while the other part is in the Earth's penumbra. Unlike a solar eclipse, which can only be viewed from a relatively small area of the world, a lunar eclipse may be viewed from anywhere on the night side of Earth. Occurring only about 1.5 hours before perigee (on August 5, 1952, at 21:25 UTC), the Moon's apparent diameter was larger.

== Visibility ==
The eclipse was completely visible over east Africa, much of Asia, western Australia, and Antarctica, seen rising over west Africa, Europe, and eastern South America and setting over northeast Asia and eastern Australia.

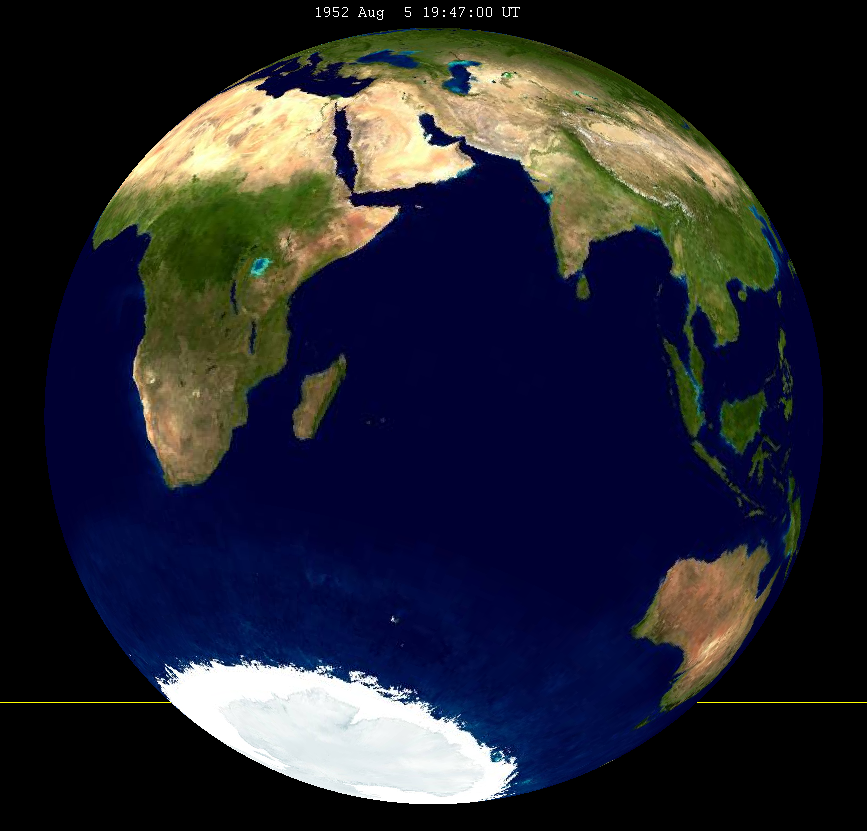
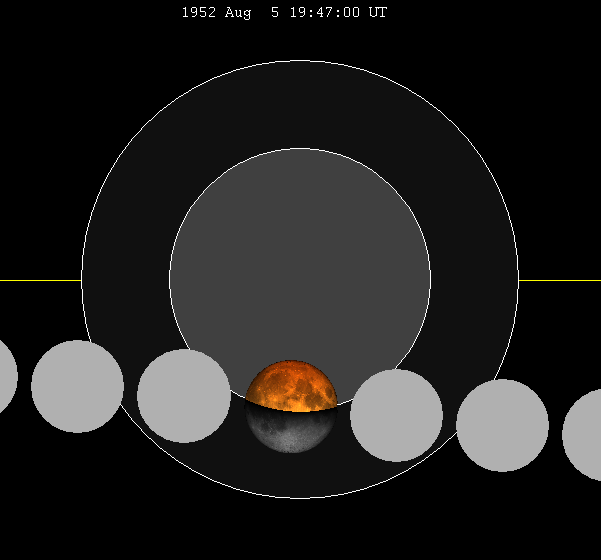

== Eclipse details ==
Shown below is a table displaying details about this particular lunar eclipse. It describes various parameters pertaining to this eclipse.

August 5, 1952 Lunar Eclipse Parameters
Parameter	Value
Penumbral Magnitude	1.47418
Umbral Magnitude	0.53177
Gamma	−0.73835
Sun Right Ascension	09h03m03.1s
Sun Declination	+16°50'04.8"
Sun Semi-Diameter	15'46.2"
Sun Equatorial Horizontal Parallax	08.7"
Moon Right Ascension	21h04m14.8s
Moon Declination	-17°32'03.6"
Moon Semi-Diameter	16'44.0"
Moon Equatorial Horizontal Parallax	1°01'24.7"
ΔT	30.1 s

== Eclipse season ==
This eclipse is part of an eclipse season, a period, roughly every six months, when eclipses occur. Only two (or occasionally three) eclipse seasons occur each year, and each season lasts about 35 days and repeats just short of six months (173 days) later; thus two full eclipse seasons always occur each year. Either two or three eclipses happen each eclipse season. In the sequence below, each eclipse is separated by a fortnight.

Eclipse season of August 1952
August 5 Ascending node (full moon)	August 20 Descending node (new moon)
Partial lunar eclipse Lunar Saros 118	Annular solar eclipse Solar Saros 144

== Related eclipses ==
=== Eclipses in 1952 ===
- A partial lunar eclipse on February 11.
- A total solar eclipse on February 25.
- A partial lunar eclipse on August 5.
- An annular solar eclipse on August 20.

=== Metonic ===
- Preceded by: Lunar eclipse of October 18, 1948
- Followed by: Lunar eclipse of May 24, 1956

=== Tzolkinex ===
- Preceded by: Lunar eclipse of June 25, 1945
- Followed by: Lunar eclipse of September 17, 1959

=== Half-Saros ===
- Preceded by: Solar eclipse of August 1, 1943
- Followed by: Solar eclipse of August 11, 1961

=== Tritos ===
- Preceded by: Lunar eclipse of September 5, 1941
- Followed by: Lunar eclipse of July 6, 1963

=== Lunar Saros 118 ===
- Preceded by: Lunar eclipse of July 26, 1934
- Followed by: Lunar eclipse of August 17, 1970

=== Inex ===
- Preceded by: Lunar eclipse of August 26, 1923
- Followed by: Lunar eclipse of July 17, 1981

=== Triad ===
- Preceded by: Lunar eclipse of October 4, 1865
- Followed by: Lunar eclipse of June 6, 2039

=== Lunar eclipses of 1951–1955 ===
This eclipse is a member of a semester series. An eclipse in a semester series of lunar eclipses repeats approximately every 177 days and 4 hours (a semester) at alternating nodes of the Moon's orbit.

The penumbral lunar eclipses on March 23, 1951 and September 15, 1951 occur in the previous lunar year eclipse set, and the lunar eclipses on June 5, 1955 (penumbral) and November 29, 1955 (partial) occur in the next lunar year eclipse set.

Lunar eclipse series sets from 1951 to 1955
Descending node				Ascending node			
Saros	Date Viewing	Type Chart	Gamma	Saros	Date Viewing	Type Chart	Gamma
103	1951 Feb 21	Penumbral	−	108	1951 Aug 17	Penumbral	−1.4828
113	1952 Feb 11	Partial	0.9416	118	1952 Aug 05	Partial	−0.7384
123	1953 Jan 29	Total	0.2606	128	1953 Jul 26	Total	−0.0071
133	1954 Jan 19	Total	−0.4357	138	1954 Jul 16	Partial	0.7877
143	1955 Jan 08	Penumbral	−1.0907				

=== Saros 118 ===
This eclipse is a part of Saros series 118, repeating every 18 years, 11 days, and containing 73 events. The series started with a penumbral lunar eclipse on March 2, 1105. It contains partial eclipses from June 8, 1267 through August 12, 1375; total eclipses from August 22, 1393 through June 22, 1880; and a second set of partial eclipses from July 3, 1898 through September 18, 2024. The series ends at member 73 as a penumbral eclipse on May 7, 2403.

The longest duration of totality was produced by member 37 at 99 minutes, 22 seconds on April 7, 1754. All eclipses in this series occur at the Moon’s ascending node of orbit.

Greatest	First			
The greatest eclipse of the series occurred on 1754 Apr 07, lasting 99 minutes, 22 seconds.	Penumbral	Partial	Total	Central
The greatest eclipse of the series occurred on 1754 Apr 07, lasting 99 minutes, 22 seconds.	1105 Mar 02	1267 Jun 08	1393 Aug 22	1465 Oct 04
The greatest eclipse of the series occurred on 1754 Apr 07, lasting 99 minutes, 22 seconds.	Last			
The greatest eclipse of the series occurred on 1754 Apr 07, lasting 99 minutes, 22 seconds.	Central	Total	Partial	Penumbral
The greatest eclipse of the series occurred on 1754 Apr 07, lasting 99 minutes, 22 seconds.	1826 May 21	1880 Jun 22	2024 Sep 18	2403 May 07

Eclipses are tabulated in three columns; every third eclipse in the same column is one exeligmos apart, so they all cast shadows over approximately the same parts of the Earth.

Series members 40–61 occur between 1801 and 2200:
40	41	42
1808 May 10	1826 May 21	1844 May 31
43	44	45
1862 Jun 12	1880 Jun 22	1898 Jul 03
46	47	48
1916 Jul 15	1934 Jul 26	1952 Aug 05
49	50	51
1970 Aug 17	1988 Aug 27	2006 Sep 07
52	53	54
2024 Sep 18	2042 Sep 29	2060 Oct 09
55	56	57
2078 Oct 21	2096 Oct 31	2114 Nov 12
58	59	60
2132 Nov 23	2150 Dec 04	2168 Dec 14
61
2186 Dec 26

=== Tritos series ===
This eclipse is a part of a tritos cycle, repeating at alternating nodes every 135 synodic months (≈ 3986.63 days, or 11 years minus 1 month). Their appearance and longitude are irregular due to a lack of synchronization with the anomalistic month (period of perigee), but groupings of 3 tritos cycles (≈ 33 years minus 3 months) come close (≈ 434.044 anomalistic months), so eclipses are similar in these groupings.

Series members between 1801 and 2200
1810 Sep 13 (Saros 105)	1821 Aug 13 (Saros 106)	1832 Jul 12 (Saros 107)	1843 Jun 12 (Saros 108)	1854 May 12 (Saros 109)
1865 Apr 11 (Saros 110)	1876 Mar 10 (Saros 111)	1887 Feb 08 (Saros 112)	1898 Jan 08 (Saros 113)	1908 Dec 07 (Saros 114)
1919 Nov 07 (Saros 115)	1930 Oct 07 (Saros 116)	1941 Sep 05 (Saros 117)	1952 Aug 05 (Saros 118)	1963 Jul 06 (Saros 119)
1974 Jun 04 (Saros 120)	1985 May 04 (Saros 121)	1996 Apr 04 (Saros 122)	2007 Mar 03 (Saros 123)	2018 Jan 31 (Saros 124)
2028 Dec 31 (Saros 125)	2039 Nov 30 (Saros 126)	2050 Oct 30 (Saros 127)	2061 Sep 29 (Saros 128)	2072 Aug 28 (Saros 129)
2083 Jul 29 (Saros 130)	2094 Jun 28 (Saros 131)	2105 May 28 (Saros 132)	2116 Apr 27 (Saros 133)	2127 Mar 28 (Saros 134)
2138 Feb 24 (Saros 135)	2149 Jan 23 (Saros 136)	2159 Dec 24 (Saros 137)	2170 Nov 23 (Saros 138)	2181 Oct 22 (Saros 139)
2192 Sep 21 (Saros 140)

=== Inex series ===
This eclipse is a part of the long period inex cycle, repeating at alternating nodes, every 358 synodic months (≈ 10,571.95 days, or 29 years minus 20 days). Their appearance and longitude are irregular due to a lack of synchronization with the anomalistic month (period of perigee). However, groupings of 3 inex cycles (≈ 87 years minus 2 months) comes close (≈ 1,151.02 anomalistic months), so eclipses are similar in these groupings.

Series members between 1801 and 2200
1807 Nov 15 (Saros 113)	1836 Oct 24 (Saros 114)	1865 Oct 04 (Saros 115)
1894 Sep 15 (Saros 116)	1923 Aug 26 (Saros 117)	1952 Aug 05 (Saros 118)
1981 Jul 17 (Saros 119)	2010 Jun 26 (Saros 120)	2039 Jun 06 (Saros 121)
2068 May 17 (Saros 122)	2097 Apr 26 (Saros 123)	2126 Apr 07 (Saros 124)
2155 Mar 19 (Saros 125)	2184 Feb 26 (Saros 126)	

=== Half-Saros cycle ===
A lunar eclipse will be preceded and followed by solar eclipses by 9 years and 5.5 days (a half saros). This lunar eclipse is related to two annular solar eclipses of Solar Saros 125.

August 1, 1943	August 11, 1961

== See also ==
- List of lunar eclipses
- List of 20th-century lunar eclipses
