= July 1916 lunar eclipse =

Partial lunar eclipse in 1916

- Partial eclipse
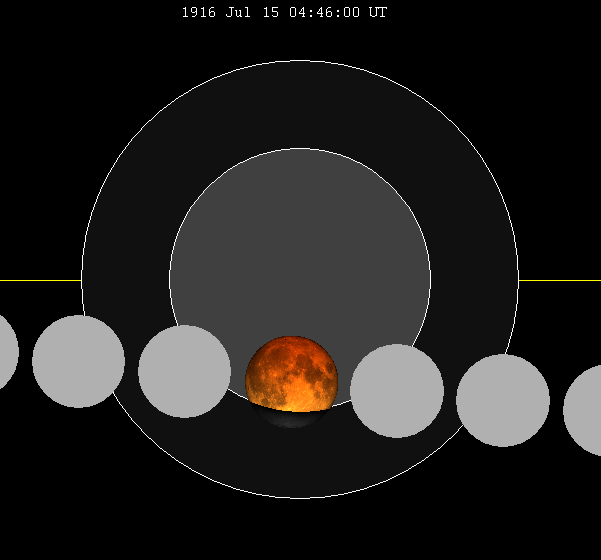
- The Moon's hourly motion shown right to left
- Date: July 15, 1916
- Gamma: −0.5957
- Magnitude: 0.7944
- Saros cycle: 118 (46 of 74)
- Partiality: 172 minutes, 30 seconds
- Penumbral: 292 minutes, 24 seconds
Contacts (UTC)
- P1: 2:19:36
- U1: 3:19:33
- Greatest: 4:45:49
- U4: 6:12:03
- P4: 7:12:00

A partial lunar eclipse occurred at the Moon's ascending node of orbit on Saturday, July 15, 1916, with an umbral magnitude of 0.7944. A lunar eclipse occurs when the Moon moves into the Earth's shadow, causing the Moon to be darkened. A partial lunar eclipse occurs when one part of the Moon is in the Earth's umbra, while the other part is in the Earth's penumbra. Unlike a solar eclipse, which can only be viewed from a relatively small area of the world, a lunar eclipse may be viewed from anywhere on the night side of Earth. Occurring only about 3.5 hours after perigee (on July 15, 1916, at 1:15 UTC), the Moon's apparent diameter was larger.

== Observations ==
The Ross Sea party was a component of Sir Ernest Shackleton's Imperial Trans-Antarctic Expedition of 1914–17. Five men were stranded not far away from Cape Evans. There was sea ice between them and the relative safety of the hut on Cape Evans. On May 8 two of the men, Aeneas Mackintosh and Victor Hayward, decided to make an attempt to reach the hut. Soon after they set out, a blizzard hit. When the weather cleared up, the remaining men tried to look for them, but realized that the ice was far too thin to cross, and that their friends had been lost. Now they knew that they should wait for a thicker ice and for the full moon to attempt the crossing. Having the full moon was essential, because during polar night the moon is the only source of natural light other than the extremely dim light of the stars.

The weather did not cooperate during the full moon of June, but on July 15, everything seemed to be just right: calm weather, thick ice, clear skies and a full moon. The men started their journey in the morning. When the moon rose, however, the men were surprised to find it was about to be eclipsed. Ernest Wild wrote later:

"I thought we were going to be left in darkness but a very little bit of the rim remained to light us..."

Although the eclipse continued for a few hours, the men were fortunate because it was only a partial eclipse. They reached Cape Evans later on the same day.

== Visibility ==
The eclipse was completely visible over eastern North America, South America, and Antarctica, seen rising over western North America and the central Pacific Ocean and setting over Africa and western Europe.

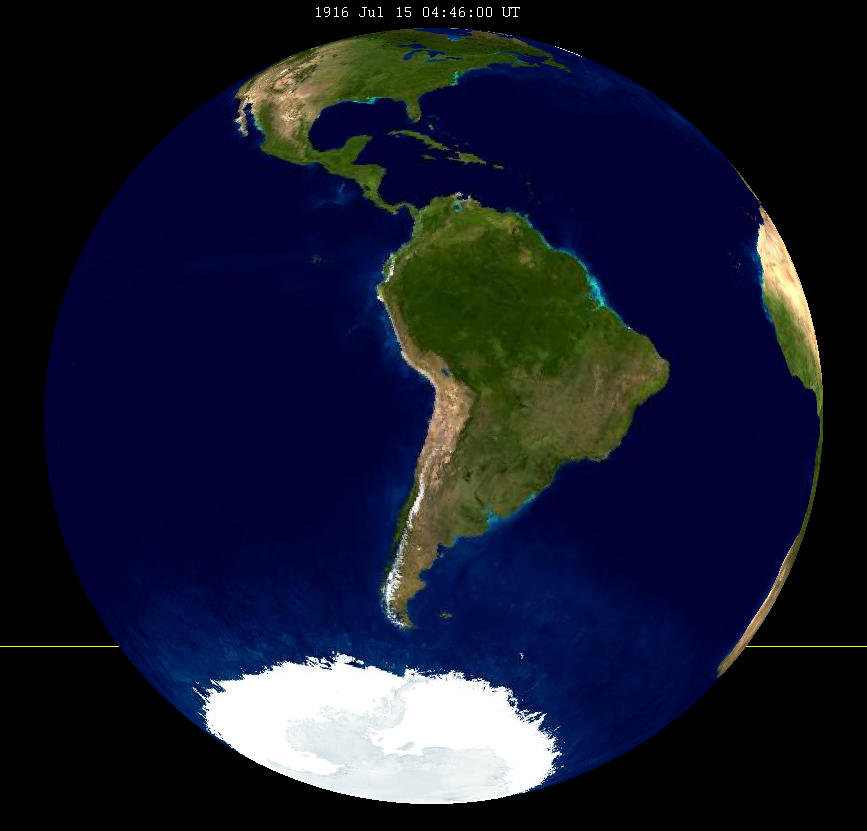
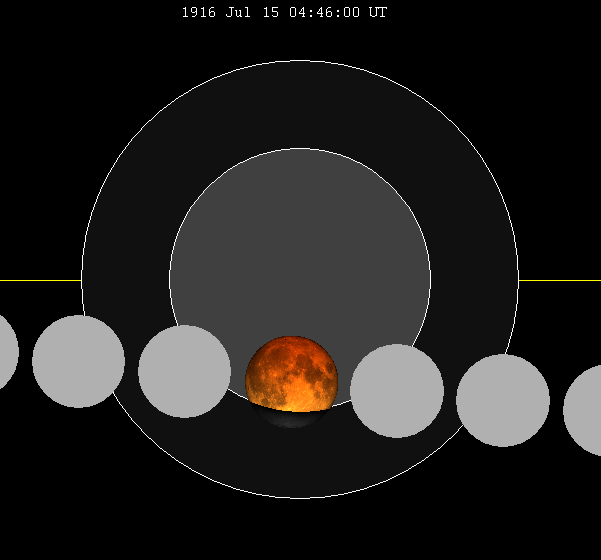

== Eclipse details ==
Shown below is a table displaying details about this particular solar eclipse. It describes various parameters pertaining to this eclipse.

July 15, 1916 Lunar Eclipse Parameters
Parameter	Value
Penumbral Magnitude	1.73508
Umbral Magnitude	0.79437
Gamma	−0.59568
Sun Right Ascension	07h36m32.1s
Sun Declination	+21°35'52.3"
Sun Semi-Diameter	15'44.1"
Sun Equatorial Horizontal Parallax	08.7"
Moon Right Ascension	19h37m12.9s
Moon Declination	-22°11'11.4"
Moon Semi-Diameter	16'43.6"
Moon Equatorial Horizontal Parallax	1°01'23.4"
ΔT	18.8 s

== Eclipse season ==
This eclipse is part of an eclipse season, a period, roughly every six months, when eclipses occur. Only two (or occasionally three) eclipse seasons occur each year, and each season lasts about 35 days and repeats just short of six months (173 days) later; thus two full eclipse seasons always occur each year. Either two or three eclipses happen each eclipse season. In the sequence below, each eclipse is separated by a fortnight.

Eclipse season of July 1916
July 15 Ascending node (full moon)	July 30 Descending node (new moon)
Penumbral lunar eclipse Lunar Saros 118	Annular solar eclipse Solar Saros 144

== Related eclipses ==
=== Eclipses in 1916 ===
- A partial lunar eclipse on January 20.
- A total solar eclipse on February 3.
- A partial lunar eclipse on July 15.
- An annular solar eclipse on July 30.
- A partial solar eclipse on December 24.

=== Metonic ===
- Preceded by: Lunar eclipse of September 26, 1912
- Followed by: Lunar eclipse of May 3, 1920

=== Tzolkinex ===
- Preceded by: Lunar eclipse of June 4, 1909
- Followed by: Lunar eclipse of August 26, 1923

=== Half-Saros ===
- Preceded by: Solar eclipse of July 10, 1907
- Followed by: Solar eclipse of July 20, 1925

=== Tritos ===
- Preceded by: Lunar eclipse of August 15, 1905
- Followed by: Lunar eclipse of June 15, 1927

=== Lunar Saros 118 ===
- Preceded by: Lunar eclipse of July 3, 1898
- Followed by: Lunar eclipse of July 26, 1934

=== Inex ===
- Preceded by: Lunar eclipse of August 3, 1887
- Followed by: Lunar eclipse of June 25, 1945

=== Triad ===
- Preceded by: Lunar eclipse of September 13, 1829
- Followed by: Lunar eclipse of May 16, 2003

=== Lunar eclipses of 1915–1918 ===
This eclipse is a member of a semester series. An eclipse in a semester series of lunar eclipses repeats approximately every 177 days and 4 hours (a semester) at alternating nodes of the Moon's orbit.

The penumbral lunar eclipses on March 1, 1915 and August 24, 1915 occur in the previous lunar year eclipse set.

Lunar eclipse series sets from 1915 to 1918
Descending node				Ascending node			
Saros	Date Viewing	Type Chart	Gamma	Saros	Date Viewing	Type Chart	Gamma
103	1915 Jan 31	Penumbral	1.5450	108	1915 Jul 26	Penumbral	−1.3553
113	1916 Jan 20	Partial	0.9146	118	1916 Jul 15	Partial	−0.5956
123	1917 Jan 08	Total	0.2415	128	1917 Jul 04	Total	0.1419
133	1917 Dec 28	Total	−0.4484	138	1918 Jun 24	Partial	0.9397
133	1918 Dec 17	Penumbral	−1.1035				

=== Saros 118 ===
This eclipse is a part of Saros series 118, repeating every 18 years, 11 days, and containing 73 events. The series started with a penumbral lunar eclipse on March 2, 1105. It contains partial eclipses from June 8, 1267 through August 12, 1375; total eclipses from August 22, 1393 through June 22, 1880; and a second set of partial eclipses from July 3, 1898 through September 18, 2024. The series ends at member 73 as a penumbral eclipse on May 7, 2403.

The longest duration of totality was produced by member 37 at 99 minutes, 22 seconds on April 7, 1754. All eclipses in this series occur at the Moon’s ascending node of orbit.

Greatest	First			
The greatest eclipse of the series occurred on 1754 Apr 07, lasting 99 minutes, 22 seconds.	Penumbral	Partial	Total	Central
The greatest eclipse of the series occurred on 1754 Apr 07, lasting 99 minutes, 22 seconds.	1105 Mar 02	1267 Jun 08	1393 Aug 22	1465 Oct 04
The greatest eclipse of the series occurred on 1754 Apr 07, lasting 99 minutes, 22 seconds.	Last			
The greatest eclipse of the series occurred on 1754 Apr 07, lasting 99 minutes, 22 seconds.	Central	Total	Partial	Penumbral
The greatest eclipse of the series occurred on 1754 Apr 07, lasting 99 minutes, 22 seconds.	1826 May 21	1880 Jun 22	2024 Sep 18	2403 May 07

Eclipses are tabulated in three columns; every third eclipse in the same column is one exeligmos apart, so they all cast shadows over approximately the same parts of the Earth.

Series members 40–61 occur between 1801 and 2200:
40	41	42
1808 May 10	1826 May 21	1844 May 31
43	44	45
1862 Jun 12	1880 Jun 22	1898 Jul 03
46	47	48
1916 Jul 15	1934 Jul 26	1952 Aug 05
49	50	51
1970 Aug 17	1988 Aug 27	2006 Sep 07
52	53	54
2024 Sep 18	2042 Sep 29	2060 Oct 09
55	56	57
2078 Oct 21	2096 Oct 31	2114 Nov 12
58	59	60
2132 Nov 23	2150 Dec 04	2168 Dec 14
61
2186 Dec 26

=== Tritos series ===
This eclipse is a part of a tritos cycle, repeating at alternating nodes every 135 synodic months (≈ 3986.63 days, or 11 years minus 1 month). Their appearance and longitude are irregular due to a lack of synchronization with the anomalistic month (period of perigee), but groupings of 3 tritos cycles (≈ 33 years minus 3 months) come close (≈ 434.044 anomalistic months), so eclipses are similar in these groupings.

Series members between 1801 and 2200
1807 May 21 (Saros 108)	1818 Apr 21 (Saros 109)	1829 Mar 20 (Saros 110)	1840 Feb 17 (Saros 111)	1851 Jan 17 (Saros 112)
1861 Dec 17 (Saros 113)	1872 Nov 15 (Saros 114)	1883 Oct 16 (Saros 115)	1894 Sep 15 (Saros 116)	1905 Aug 15 (Saros 117)
1916 Jul 15 (Saros 118)	1927 Jun 15 (Saros 119)	1938 May 14 (Saros 120)	1949 Apr 13 (Saros 121)	1960 Mar 13 (Saros 122)
1971 Feb 10 (Saros 123)	1982 Jan 09 (Saros 124)	1992 Dec 09 (Saros 125)	2003 Nov 09 (Saros 126)	2014 Oct 08 (Saros 127)
2025 Sep 07 (Saros 128)	2036 Aug 07 (Saros 129)	2047 Jul 07 (Saros 130)	2058 Jun 06 (Saros 131)	2069 May 06 (Saros 132)
2080 Apr 04 (Saros 133)	2091 Mar 05 (Saros 134)	2102 Feb 03 (Saros 135)	2113 Jan 02 (Saros 136)	2123 Dec 03 (Saros 137)
2134 Nov 02 (Saros 138)	2145 Sep 30 (Saros 139)	2156 Aug 30 (Saros 140)	2167 Aug 01 (Saros 141)	2178 Jun 30 (Saros 142)
2189 May 29 (Saros 143)	2200 Apr 30 (Saros 144)			

=== Inex series ===
This eclipse is a part of the long period inex cycle, repeating at alternating nodes, every 358 synodic months (≈ 10,571.95 days, or 29 years minus 20 days). Their appearance and longitude are irregular due to a lack of synchronization with the anomalistic month (period of perigee). However, groupings of 3 inex cycles (≈ 87 years minus 2 months) comes close (≈ 1,151.02 anomalistic months), so eclipses are similar in these groupings.

Series members between 1801 and 2200
1829 Sep 13 (Saros 115)	1858 Aug 24 (Saros 116)	1887 Aug 03 (Saros 117)
1916 Jul 15 (Saros 118)	1945 Jun 25 (Saros 119)	1974 Jun 04 (Saros 120)
2003 May 16 (Saros 121)	2032 Apr 25 (Saros 122)	2061 Apr 04 (Saros 123)
2090 Mar 15 (Saros 124)	2119 Feb 25 (Saros 125)	2148 Feb 04 (Saros 126)
2177 Jan 14 (Saros 127)

=== Half-Saros cycle ===
A lunar eclipse will be preceded and followed by solar eclipses by 9 years and 5.5 days (a half saros). This lunar eclipse is related to two annular solar eclipses of Solar Saros 125.

July 10, 1907	July 20, 1925

== See also ==
- List of lunar eclipses
- List of 20th-century lunar eclipses
