= September 2042 lunar eclipse =

Astronomical event

- Penumbral eclipse
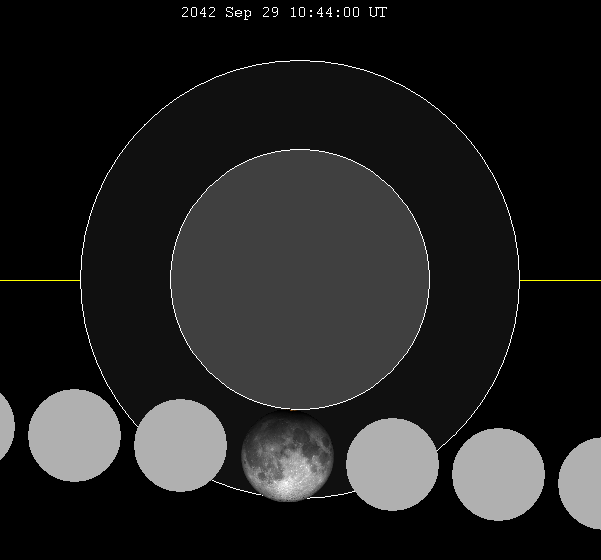
- The Moon's hourly motion shown right to left
- Date: September 29, 2042
- Gamma: −1.0261
- Magnitude: −0.0011
- Saros cycle: 118 (53 of 73)
- Penumbral: 238 minutes, 32 seconds
Contacts (UTC)
- P1: 8:45:03
- Greatest: 10:44:20
- P4: 12:43:35

A penumbral lunar eclipse will occur at the Moon’s ascending node of orbit on Monday, September 29, 2042, with an umbral magnitude of −0.0011. A lunar eclipse occurs when the Moon moves into the Earth's shadow, causing the Moon to be darkened. A penumbral lunar eclipse occurs when part or all of the Moon's near side passes into the Earth's penumbra. Unlike a solar eclipse, which can only be viewed from a relatively small area of the world, a lunar eclipse may be viewed from anywhere on the night side of Earth. Occurring only about 9 hours before perigee (on September 29, 2042, at 19:45 UTC), the Moon's apparent diameter will be larger.

Earlier sources compute this as a 0.3% partial eclipse lasting under 12 minutes, but newer calculations list it as a penumbral eclipse that never enters the umbral shadow.

== Visibility ==
The eclipse will be completely visible over eastern Australia, northeast Asia, and western North America, seen rising over east Asia and western Australia and setting over eastern North America and South America.

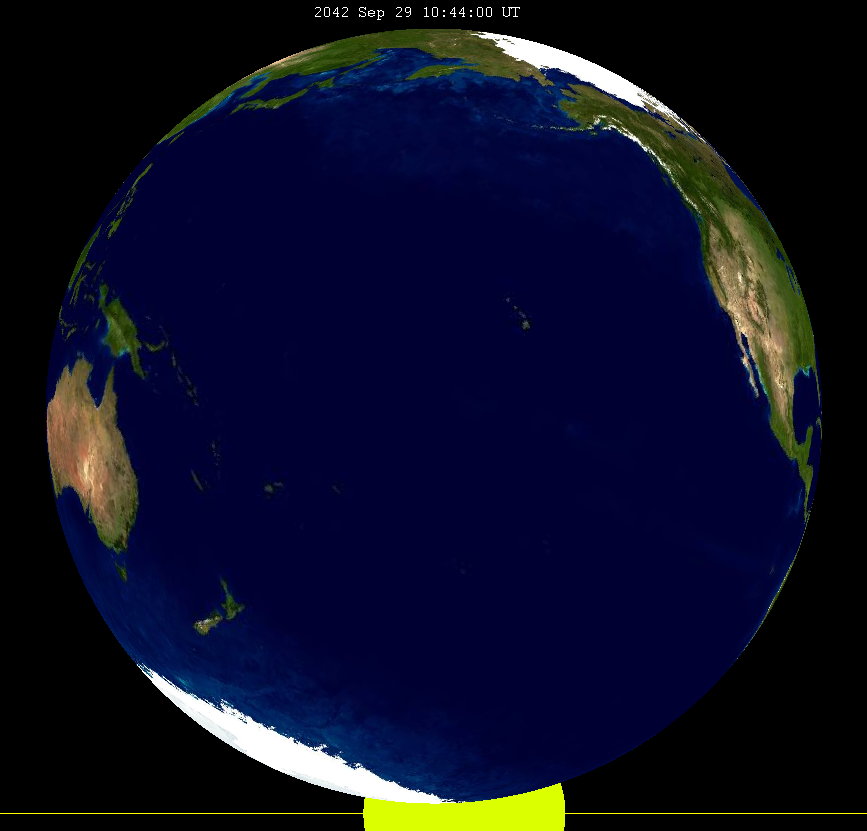
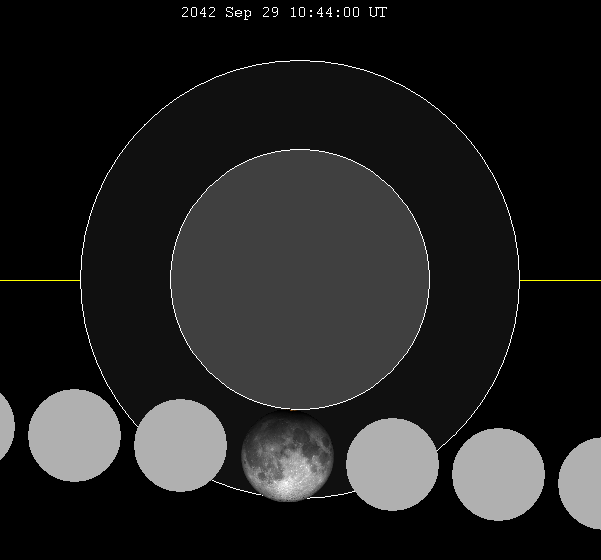

== Eclipse details ==
Shown below is a table displaying details about this particular solar eclipse. It describes various parameters pertaining to this eclipse.

September 29, 2042 Lunar Eclipse Parameters
Parameter	Value
Penumbral Magnitude	0.95481
Umbral Magnitude	−0.00105
Gamma	−1.02617
Sun Right Ascension	12h23m37.3s
Sun Declination	-02°33'13.4"
Sun Semi-Diameter	15'57.9"
Sun Equatorial Horizontal Parallax	08.8"
Moon Right Ascension	00h25m38.7s
Moon Declination	+01°38'07.3"
Moon Semi-Diameter	16'42.1"
Moon Equatorial Horizontal Parallax	1°01'18.0"
ΔT	80.7 s

== Eclipse season ==
This eclipse is part of an eclipse season, a period, roughly every six months, when eclipses occur. Only two (or occasionally three) eclipse seasons occur each year, and each season lasts about 35 days and repeats just short of six months (173 days) later; thus two full eclipse seasons always occur each year. Either two or three eclipses happen each eclipse season. In the sequence below, each eclipse is separated by a fortnight. The first and last eclipse in this sequence is separated by one synodic month.

Eclipse season of September–October 2042
September 29 Ascending node (full moon)	October 14 Descending node (new moon)	October 28 Ascending node (full moon)
Penumbral lunar eclipse Lunar Saros 118	Annular solar eclipse Solar Saros 144	Penumbral lunar eclipse Lunar Saros 156

== Related eclipses ==
=== Eclipses in 2042 ===
- A penumbral lunar eclipse on April 5.
- A total solar eclipse on April 20.
- A penumbral lunar eclipse on September 29.
- An annular solar eclipse on October 14.
- A penumbral lunar eclipse on October 28.

=== Metonic ===
- Preceded by: Lunar eclipse of December 11, 2038
- Followed by: Lunar eclipse of July 18, 2046

=== Tzolkinex ===
- Preceded by: Lunar eclipse of August 19, 2035
- Followed by: Lunar eclipse of November 9, 2049

=== Half-Saros ===
- Preceded by: Solar eclipse of September 23, 2033
- Followed by: Solar eclipse of October 4, 2051

=== Tritos ===
- Preceded by: Lunar eclipse of October 30, 2031
- Followed by: Lunar eclipse of August 29, 2053

=== Lunar Saros 118 ===
- Preceded by: Lunar eclipse of September 18, 2024
- Followed by: Lunar eclipse of October 9, 2060

=== Inex ===
- Preceded by: Lunar eclipse of October 18, 2013
- Followed by: Lunar eclipse of September 9, 2071

=== Triad ===
- Preceded by: Lunar eclipse of November 29, 1955
- Followed by: Lunar eclipse of July 31, 2129

=== Lunar eclipses of 2042–2045 ===
This eclipse is a member of a semester series. An eclipse in a semester series of lunar eclipses repeats approximately every 177 days and 4 hours (a semester) at alternating nodes of the Moon's orbit.

The penumbral lunar eclipse on October 28, 2042 occurs in the previous lunar year eclipse set.

Lunar eclipse series sets from 2042 to 2045
Descending node				Ascending node			
Saros	Date Viewing	Type Chart	Gamma	Saros	Date Viewing	Type Chart	Gamma
113	2042 Apr 05	Penumbral	1.1080	118	2042 Sep 29	Penumbral	−1.0261
123	2043 Mar 25	Total	0.3849	128	2043 Sep 19	Total	−0.3316
133	2044 Mar 13	Total	−0.3496	138	2044 Sep 07	Total	0.4318
143	2045 Mar 03	Penumbral	−1.0274	148	2045 Aug 27	Penumbral	1.2060

=== Saros 118 ===
This eclipse is a part of Saros series 118, repeating every 18 years, 11 days, and containing 73 events. The series started with a penumbral lunar eclipse on March 2, 1105. It contains partial eclipses from June 8, 1267 through August 12, 1375; total eclipses from August 22, 1393 through June 22, 1880; and a second set of partial eclipses from July 3, 1898 through September 18, 2024. The series ends at member 73 as a penumbral eclipse on May 7, 2403.

The longest duration of totality was produced by member 37 at 99 minutes, 22 seconds on April 7, 1754. All eclipses in this series occur at the Moon’s ascending node of orbit.

Greatest	First			
The greatest eclipse of the series occurred on 1754 Apr 07, lasting 99 minutes, 22 seconds.	Penumbral	Partial	Total	Central
The greatest eclipse of the series occurred on 1754 Apr 07, lasting 99 minutes, 22 seconds.	1105 Mar 02	1267 Jun 08	1393 Aug 22	1465 Oct 04
The greatest eclipse of the series occurred on 1754 Apr 07, lasting 99 minutes, 22 seconds.	Last			
The greatest eclipse of the series occurred on 1754 Apr 07, lasting 99 minutes, 22 seconds.	Central	Total	Partial	Penumbral
The greatest eclipse of the series occurred on 1754 Apr 07, lasting 99 minutes, 22 seconds.	1826 May 21	1880 Jun 22	2024 Sep 18	2403 May 07

Eclipses are tabulated in three columns; every third eclipse in the same column is one exeligmos apart, so they all cast shadows over approximately the same parts of the Earth.

Series members 40–61 occur between 1801 and 2200:
40	41	42
1808 May 10	1826 May 21	1844 May 31
43	44	45
1862 Jun 12	1880 Jun 22	1898 Jul 03
46	47	48
1916 Jul 15	1934 Jul 26	1952 Aug 05
49	50	51
1970 Aug 17	1988 Aug 27	2006 Sep 07
52	53	54
2024 Sep 18	2042 Sep 29	2060 Oct 09
55	56	57
2078 Oct 21	2096 Oct 31	2114 Nov 12
58	59	60
2132 Nov 23	2150 Dec 04	2168 Dec 14
61
2186 Dec 26

=== Tritos series ===
This eclipse is a part of a tritos cycle, repeating at alternating nodes every 135 synodic months (≈ 3986.63 days, or 11 years minus 1 month). Their appearance and longitude are irregular due to a lack of synchronization with the anomalistic month (period of perigee), but groupings of 3 tritos cycles (≈ 33 years minus 3 months) come close (≈ 434.044 anomalistic months), so eclipses are similar in these groupings.

Series members between 1835 and 2200
1835 May 12 (Saros 99)	1846 Apr 11 (Saros 100)		1868 Feb 08 (Saros 102)	1879 Jan 08 (Saros 103)
				1933 Aug 05 (Saros 108)
1944 Jul 06 (Saros 109)	1955 Jun 05 (Saros 110)	1966 May 04 (Saros 111)	1977 Apr 04 (Saros 112)	1988 Mar 03 (Saros 113)
1999 Jan 31 (Saros 114)	2009 Dec 31 (Saros 115)	2020 Nov 30 (Saros 116)	2031 Oct 30 (Saros 117)	2042 Sep 29 (Saros 118)
2053 Aug 29 (Saros 119)	2064 Jul 28 (Saros 120)	2075 Jun 28 (Saros 121)	2086 May 28 (Saros 122)	2097 Apr 26 (Saros 123)
2108 Mar 27 (Saros 124)	2119 Feb 25 (Saros 125)	2130 Jan 24 (Saros 126)	2140 Dec 23 (Saros 127)	2151 Nov 24 (Saros 128)
2162 Oct 23 (Saros 129)	2173 Sep 21 (Saros 130)	2184 Aug 21 (Saros 131)	2195 Jul 22 (Saros 132)	

=== Inex series ===
This eclipse is a part of the long period inex cycle, repeating at alternating nodes, every 358 synodic months (≈ 10,571.95 days, or 29 years minus 20 days). Their appearance and longitude are irregular due to a lack of synchronization with the anomalistic month (period of perigee). However, groupings of 3 inex cycles (≈ 87 years minus 2 months) comes close (≈ 1,151.02 anomalistic months), so eclipses are similar in these groupings.

Series members between 1801 and 2200
1811 Mar 10 (Saros 110)	1840 Feb 17 (Saros 111)	1869 Jan 28 (Saros 112)
1898 Jan 08 (Saros 113)	1926 Dec 19 (Saros 114)	1955 Nov 29 (Saros 115)
1984 Nov 08 (Saros 116)	2013 Oct 18 (Saros 117)	2042 Sep 29 (Saros 118)
2071 Sep 09 (Saros 119)	2100 Aug 19 (Saros 120)	2129 Jul 31 (Saros 121)
2158 Jul 11 (Saros 122)	2187 Jun 20 (Saros 123)	

=== Half-Saros cycle ===
A lunar eclipse will be preceded and followed by solar eclipses by 9 years and 5.5 days (a half saros). This lunar eclipse is related to two annular solar eclipses of Solar Saros 125.

September 23, 2033	October 4, 2051

== See also ==
- List of lunar eclipses and List of 21st-century lunar eclipses
