= July 1934 lunar eclipse =

Partial lunar eclipse July 26, 1934

- Partial eclipse
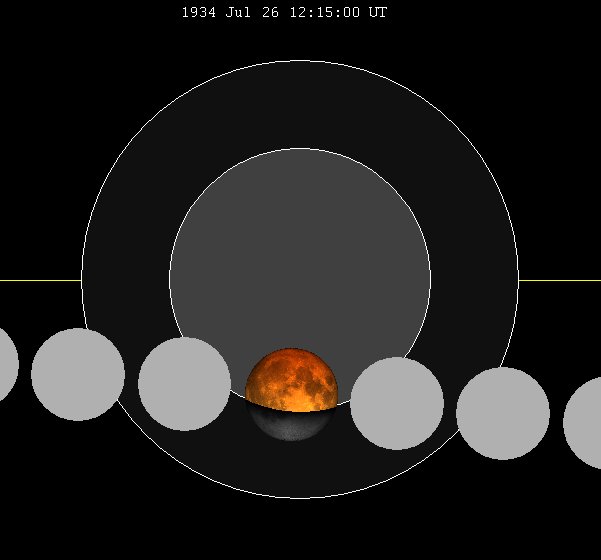
- The Moon's hourly motion shown right to left
- Date: July 26, 1934
- Gamma: −0.6681
- Magnitude: 0.6612
- Saros cycle: 118 (47 of 74)
- Partiality: 160 minutes, 49 seconds
- Penumbral: 285 minutes, 41 seconds
Contacts (UTC)
- P1: 9:52:23
- U1: 10:54:49
- Greatest: 12:15:14
- U4: 13:35:38
- P4: 14:38:04

A partial lunar eclipse occurred at the Moon’s ascending node of orbit on Thursday, July 26, 1934, with an umbral magnitude of 0.6612. A lunar eclipse occurs when the Moon moves into the Earth's shadow, causing the Moon to be darkened. A partial lunar eclipse occurs when one part of the Moon is in the Earth's umbra, while the other part is in the Earth's penumbra. Unlike a solar eclipse, which can only be viewed from a relatively small area of the world, a lunar eclipse may be viewed from anywhere on the night side of Earth. Occurring only about an hour after perigee (on July 26, 1934, at 11:20 UTC), the Moon's apparent diameter was larger.

== Visibility ==
The eclipse was completely visible over Australia and Antarctica, seen rising over south and east Asia and setting over much of North and South America.

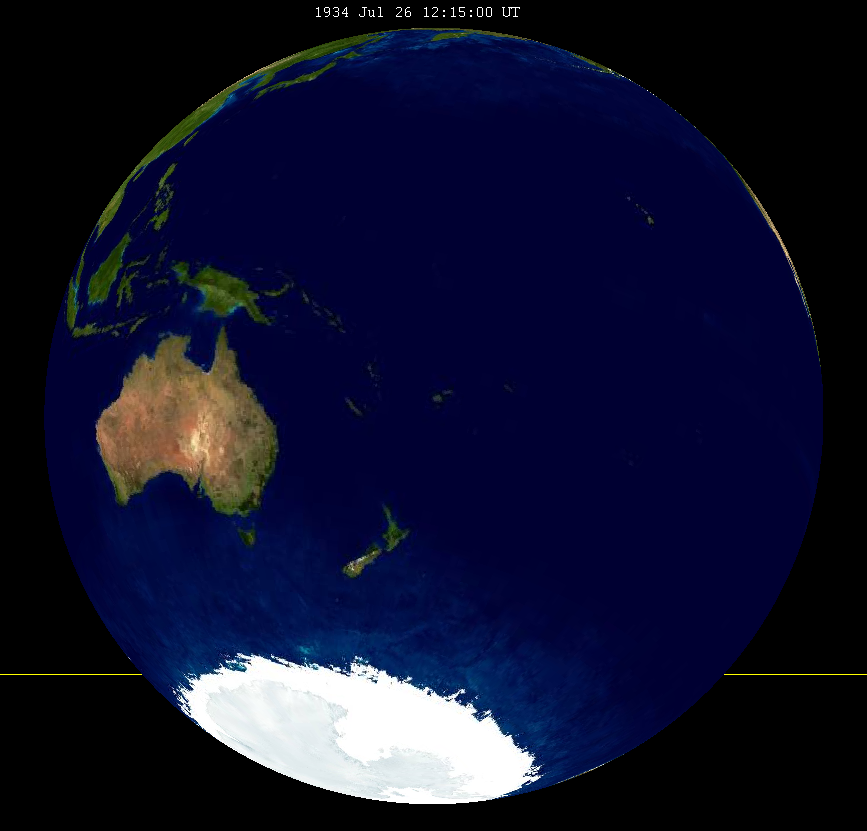
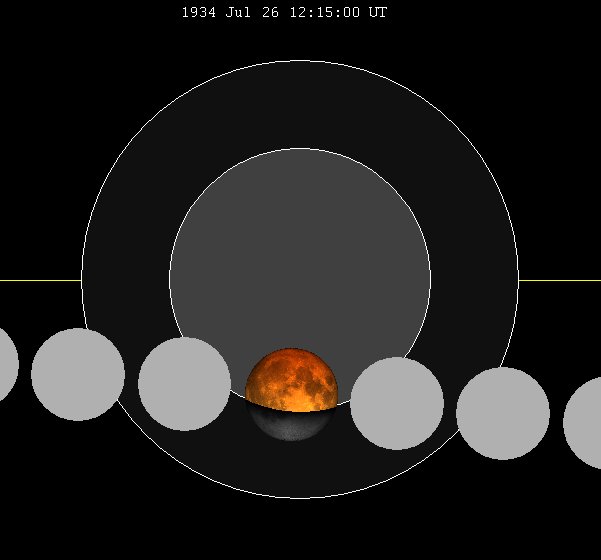

== Eclipse details ==
Shown below is a table displaying details about this particular solar eclipse. It describes various parameters pertaining to this eclipse.

July 26, 1934 Lunar Eclipse Parameters
Parameter	Value
Penumbral Magnitude	1.60248
Umbral Magnitude	0.66121
Gamma	−0.66811
Sun Right Ascension	08h20m22.6s
Sun Declination	+19°32'24.6"
Sun Semi-Diameter	15'44.9"
Sun Equatorial Horizontal Parallax	08.7"
Moon Right Ascension	20h21m19.0s
Moon Declination	-20°11'13.8"
Moon Semi-Diameter	16'43.9"
Moon Equatorial Horizontal Parallax	1°01'24.3"
ΔT	23.8 s

== Eclipse season ==
This eclipse is part of an eclipse season, a period, roughly every six months, when eclipses occur. Only two (or occasionally three) eclipse seasons occur each year, and each season lasts about 35 days and repeats just short of six months (173 days) later; thus two full eclipse seasons always occur each year. Either two or three eclipses happen each eclipse season. In the sequence below, each eclipse is separated by a fortnight.

Eclipse season of July–August 1934
July 26 Ascending node (full moon)	August 10 Descending node (new moon)
Partial lunar eclipse Lunar Saros 118	Annular solar eclipse Solar Saros 144

== Related eclipses ==
=== Eclipses in 1934 ===
- A partial lunar eclipse on January 30.
- A total solar eclipse on February 14.
- A partial lunar eclipse on July 26.
- An annular solar eclipse on August 10.

=== Metonic ===
- Preceded by: Lunar eclipse of October 7, 1930
- Followed by: Lunar eclipse of May 14, 1938

=== Tzolkinex ===
- Preceded by: Lunar eclipse of June 15, 1927
- Followed by: Lunar eclipse of September 5, 1941

=== Half-Saros ===
- Preceded by: Solar eclipse of July 20, 1925
- Followed by: Solar eclipse of August 1, 1943

=== Tritos ===
- Preceded by: Lunar eclipse of August 26, 1923
- Followed by: Lunar eclipse of June 25, 1945

=== Lunar Saros 118 ===
- Preceded by: Lunar eclipse of July 15, 1916
- Followed by: Lunar eclipse of August 5, 1952

=== Inex ===
- Preceded by: Lunar eclipse of August 15, 1905
- Followed by: Lunar eclipse of July 6, 1963

=== Triad ===
- Preceded by: Lunar eclipse of September 24, 1847
- Followed by: Lunar eclipse of May 26, 2021

=== Lunar eclipses of 1933–1936 ===
This eclipse is a member of a semester series. An eclipse in a semester series of lunar eclipses repeats approximately every 177 days and 4 hours (a semester) at alternating nodes of the Moon's orbit.

The penumbral lunar eclipses on March 12, 1933 and September 4, 1933 occur in the previous lunar year eclipse set.

Lunar eclipse series sets from 1933 to 1936
Descending node				Ascending node			
Saros	Date Viewing	Type Chart	Gamma	Saros	Date Viewing	Type Chart	Gamma
103	1933 Feb 10	Penumbral	1.5600	108	1933 Aug 05	Penumbral	−1.4216
113	1934 Jan 30	Partial	0.9258	118	1934 Jul 26	Partial	−0.6681
123	1935 Jan 19	Total	0.2498	128	1935 Jul 16	Total	0.0672
133	1936 Jan 08	Total	−0.4429	138	1936 Jul 04	Partial	0.8642
143	1936 Dec 28	Penumbral	−1.0971				

=== Saros 118 ===
This eclipse is a part of Saros series 118, repeating every 18 years, 11 days, and containing 73 events. The series started with a penumbral lunar eclipse on March 2, 1105. It contains partial eclipses from June 8, 1267 through August 12, 1375; total eclipses from August 22, 1393 through June 22, 1880; and a second set of partial eclipses from July 3, 1898 through September 18, 2024. The series ends at member 73 as a penumbral eclipse on May 7, 2403.

The longest duration of totality was produced by member 37 at 99 minutes, 22 seconds on April 7, 1754. All eclipses in this series occur at the Moon’s ascending node of orbit.

Greatest	First			
The greatest eclipse of the series occurred on 1754 Apr 07, lasting 99 minutes, 22 seconds.	Penumbral	Partial	Total	Central
The greatest eclipse of the series occurred on 1754 Apr 07, lasting 99 minutes, 22 seconds.	1105 Mar 02	1267 Jun 08	1393 Aug 22	1465 Oct 04
The greatest eclipse of the series occurred on 1754 Apr 07, lasting 99 minutes, 22 seconds.	Last			
The greatest eclipse of the series occurred on 1754 Apr 07, lasting 99 minutes, 22 seconds.	Central	Total	Partial	Penumbral
The greatest eclipse of the series occurred on 1754 Apr 07, lasting 99 minutes, 22 seconds.	1826 May 21	1880 Jun 22	2024 Sep 18	2403 May 07

Eclipses are tabulated in three columns; every third eclipse in the same column is one exeligmos apart, so they all cast shadows over approximately the same parts of the Earth.

Series members 40–61 occur between 1801 and 2200:
40	41	42
1808 May 10	1826 May 21	1844 May 31
43	44	45
1862 Jun 12	1880 Jun 22	1898 Jul 03
46	47	48
1916 Jul 15	1934 Jul 26	1952 Aug 05
49	50	51
1970 Aug 17	1988 Aug 27	2006 Sep 07
52	53	54
2024 Sep 18	2042 Sep 29	2060 Oct 09
55	56	57
2078 Oct 21	2096 Oct 31	2114 Nov 12
58	59	60
2132 Nov 23	2150 Dec 04	2168 Dec 14
61
2186 Dec 26

=== Tritos series ===
This eclipse is a part of a tritos cycle, repeating at alternating nodes every 135 synodic months (≈ 3986.63 days, or 11 years minus 1 month). Their appearance and longitude are irregular due to a lack of synchronization with the anomalistic month (period of perigee), but groupings of 3 tritos cycles (≈ 33 years minus 3 months) come close (≈ 434.044 anomalistic months), so eclipses are similar in these groupings.

Series members between 1801 and 2200
1803 Aug 03 (Saros 106)	1814 Jul 02 (Saros 107)	1825 Jun 01 (Saros 108)	1836 May 01 (Saros 109)	1847 Mar 31 (Saros 110)
1858 Feb 27 (Saros 111)	1869 Jan 28 (Saros 112)	1879 Dec 28 (Saros 113)	1890 Nov 26 (Saros 114)	1901 Oct 27 (Saros 115)
1912 Sep 26 (Saros 116)	1923 Aug 26 (Saros 117)	1934 Jul 26 (Saros 118)	1945 Jun 25 (Saros 119)	1956 May 24 (Saros 120)
1967 Apr 24 (Saros 121)	1978 Mar 24 (Saros 122)	1989 Feb 20 (Saros 123)	2000 Jan 21 (Saros 124)	2010 Dec 21 (Saros 125)
2021 Nov 19 (Saros 126)	2032 Oct 18 (Saros 127)	2043 Sep 19 (Saros 128)	2054 Aug 18 (Saros 129)	2065 Jul 17 (Saros 130)
2076 Jun 17 (Saros 131)	2087 May 17 (Saros 132)	2098 Apr 15 (Saros 133)	2109 Mar 17 (Saros 134)	2120 Feb 14 (Saros 135)
2131 Jan 13 (Saros 136)	2141 Dec 13 (Saros 137)	2152 Nov 12 (Saros 138)	2163 Oct 12 (Saros 139)	2174 Sep 11 (Saros 140)
2185 Aug 11 (Saros 141)	2196 Jul 10 (Saros 142)			

=== Inex series ===
This eclipse is a part of the long period inex cycle, repeating at alternating nodes, every 358 synodic months (≈ 10,571.95 days, or 29 years minus 20 days). Their appearance and longitude are irregular due to a lack of synchronization with the anomalistic month (period of perigee). However, groupings of 3 inex cycles (≈ 87 years minus 2 months) comes close (≈ 1,151.02 anomalistic months), so eclipses are similar in these groupings.

Series members between 1801 and 2200
1818 Oct 14 (Saros 114)	1847 Sep 24 (Saros 115)	1876 Sep 03 (Saros 116)
1905 Aug 15 (Saros 117)	1934 Jul 26 (Saros 118)	1963 Jul 06 (Saros 119)
1992 Jun 15 (Saros 120)	2021 May 26 (Saros 121)	2050 May 06 (Saros 122)
2079 Apr 16 (Saros 123)	2108 Mar 27 (Saros 124)	2137 Mar 07 (Saros 125)
2166 Feb 15 (Saros 126)	2195 Jan 26 (Saros 127)	

=== Half-Saros cycle ===
A lunar eclipse will be preceded and followed by solar eclipses by 9 years and 5.5 days (a half saros). This lunar eclipse is related to two annular solar eclipses of Solar Saros 125.

July 20, 1925	August 1, 1943

== See also ==
- List of lunar eclipses
- List of 20th-century lunar eclipses
