= Lunar Saros 118 =

Lunar eclipse

Member 51	Member 52
2006 Sep 07	2024 Sep 18

Saros cycle series 118 for lunar eclipses occurs at the moon's ascending node, 18 years 11 and 1/3 days. It contains 73 events.

This lunar saros is linked to Solar Saros 125.

== List ==
Cat.	Saros	Mem	Date	Time UT (hr:mn)	Type	Gamma	Magnitude	Duration (min)			Contacts UT (hr:mn)						Chart
Cat.	Saros	Mem	Date	Greatest	Type	Gamma	Magnitude	Pen.	Par.	Tot.	P1	P4	U1	U2	U3	U4	Chart
07477	118	1	1105 Mar 2	16:23:09	Penumbral	1.5583	-1.0362	56.3			15:55:00	16:51:18					
07523	118	2	1123 Mar 13	23:48:00	Penumbral	1.5141	-0.9522	101.1			22:57:27	0:38:33					
07569	118	3	1141 Mar 24	7:06:11	Penumbral	1.4633	-0.8561	134.1			5:59:08	8:13:14					
07616	118	4	1159 Apr 4	14:16:56	Penumbral	1.4057	-0.7475	162.5			12:55:41	15:38:11					
07663	118	5	1177 Apr 14	21:21:09	Penumbral	1.3418	-0.6274	187.7			19:47:18	22:55:00					
07709	118	6	1195 Apr 26	4:20:15	Penumbral	1.2725	-0.4974	210.3			2:35:06	6:05:24					
07755	118	7	1213 May 6	11:15:13	Penumbral	1.1983	-0.3587	230.7			9:19:52	13:10:34					
07801	118	8	1231 May 17	18:06:29	Penumbral	1.1199	-0.2123	249.0			16:01:59	20:10:59					
07846	118	9	1249 May 28	0:56:09	Penumbral	1.0389	-0.0615	265.1			22:43:36	3:08:42					
07891	118	10	1267 Jun 08	7:45:08	Partial	0.9560	0.0926	279.3	71.1		5:25:29	10:04:47	7:09:35			8:20:41	
07936	118	11	1285 Jun 18	14:36:09	Partial	0.8735	0.2457	291.3	112.8		12:10:30	17:01:48	13:39:45			15:32:33	
07981	118	12	1303 Jun 29	21:28:03	Partial	0.7904	0.3998	301.7	140.2		18:57:12	23:58:54	20:17:57			22:38:09	
08024	118	13	1321 Jul 10	4:25:23	Partial	0.7105	0.5475	310.2	159.8		1:50:17	7:00:29	3:05:29			5:45:17	
08066	118	14	1339 Jul 21	11:26:41	Partial	0.6327	0.6914	317.1	174.9		8:48:08	14:05:14	9:59:14			12:54:08	
08108	118	15	1357 Jul 31	18:35:47	Partial	0.5603	0.8249	322.5	186.1		15:54:32	21:17:02	17:02:44			20:08:50	
08149	118	16	1375 Aug 12	1:50:39	Partial	0.4917	0.9514	326.7	194.8		23:07:18	4:34:00	0:13:15			3:28:03	
08190	118	17	1393 Aug 22	9:15:18	Total	0.4300	1.0650	329.7	201.1	39.2	6:30:27	12:00:09	7:34:45	8:55:42	9:34:54	10:55:51	
08231	118	18	1411 Sep 02	16:48:09	Total	0.3740	1.1679	331.9	205.8	60.8	14:02:12	19:34:06	15:05:15	16:17:45	17:18:33	18:31:03	
08273	118	19	1429 Sep 13	0:30:32	Total	0.3250	1.2579	333.2	209.1	72.8	21:43:56	3:17:08	22:45:59	23:54:08	1:06:56	2:15:05	
08315	118	20	1447 Sep 24	8:22:29	Total	0.2832	1.3348	334.0	211.3	80.5	5:35:29	11:09:29	6:36:50	7:42:14	9:02:44	10:08:08	
08356	118	21	1465 Oct 04	16:24:28	Total	0.2490	1.3976	334.3	212.7	85.5	13:37:19	19:11:37	14:38:07	15:41:43	17:07:13	18:10:49	
08396	118	22	1483 Oct 16	0:36:00	Total	0.2218	1.4476	334.2	213.5	88.7	21:48:54	3:23:06	22:49:15	23:51:39	1:20:21	2:22:45	
08436	118	23	1501 Oct 26	8:54:58	Total	0.1999	1.4878	333.8	213.9	90.8	6:08:04	11:41:52	7:08:01	8:09:34	9:40:22	10:41:55	
08476	118	24	1519 Nov 06	17:22:27	Total	0.1846	1.5162	333.2	213.9	92.1	14:35:51	20:09:03	15:35:30	16:36:24	18:08:30	19:09:24	
08517	118	25	1537 Nov 17	1:55:51	Total	0.1738	1.5365	332.5	213.8	92.9	23:09:36	4:42:06	0:08:57	1:09:24	2:42:18	3:42:45	
08559	118	26	1555 Nov 28	10:34:50	Total	0.1671	1.5495	331.7	213.5	93.3	7:48:59	13:20:41	8:48:05	9:48:11	11:21:29	12:21:35	
08602	118	27	1573 Dec 08	19:16:17	Total	0.1620	1.5597	330.8	213.2	93.5	16:30:53	22:01:41	17:29:41	18:29:32	20:03:02	21:02:53	
08645	118	28	1591 Dec 30	4:00:35	Total	0.1588	1.5668	329.8	212.9	93.7	1:15:41	6:45:29	2:14:08	3:13:44	4:47:26	5:47:02	
08689	118	29	1610 Jan 09	12:44:36	Total	0.1549	1.5752	328.8	212.6	93.9	10:00:12	15:29:00	10:58:18	11:57:39	13:31:33	14:30:54	
08734	118	30	1628 Jan 20	21:27:26	Total	0.1499	1.5861	327.9	212.4	94.2	18:43:29	0:11:23	19:41:14	20:40:20	22:14:32	23:13:38	
08778	118	31	1646 Jan 31	6:07:04	Total	0.1417	1.6030	327.0	212.3	94.7	3:23:34	8:50:34	4:20:55	5:19:43	6:54:25	7:53:13	
08823	118	32	1664 Feb 11	14:43:15	Total	0.1303	1.6258	326.1	212.3	95.4	12:00:12	17:26:18	12:57:06	13:55:33	15:30:57	16:29:24	
08869	118	33	1682 Feb 21	23:13:12	Total	0.1132	1.6594	325.3	212.5	96.4	20:30:33	1:55:51	21:26:57	22:25:00	0:01:24	0:59:27	
08915	118	34	1700 Mar 05	7:37:27	Total	0.0909	1.7026	324.5	212.7	97.5	4:55:12	10:19:42	5:51:06	6:48:42	8:26:12	9:23:48	
08961	118	35	1718 Mar 16	15:54:36	Total	0.0622	1.7576	323.8	212.9	98.5	13:12:42	18:36:30	14:08:09	15:05:21	16:43:51	17:41:03	
09008	118	36	1736 Mar 27	0:05:53	Total	0.0283	1.8222	323.0	213.0	99.2	21:24:23	2:47:23	22:19:23	23:16:17	0:55:29	1:52:23	
09055	118	37	1754 Apr 07	8:08:01	Total	-0.0140	1.8507	322.0	212.8	99.4	5:27:01	10:49:01	6:21:37	7:18:19	8:57:43	9:54:25	
09101	118	38	1772 Apr 17	16:04:45	Total	-0.0612	1.7663	320.9	212.3	98.6	13:24:18	18:45:12	14:18:36	15:15:27	16:54:03	17:50:54	
09146	118	39	1790 Apr 28	23:53:39	Total	-0.1156	1.6685	319.4	211.1	96.6	21:13:57	2:33:21	22:08:06	23:05:21	0:41:57	1:39:12	
09191	118	40	1808 May 10	7:38:16	Total	-0.1736	1.5637	317.5	209.2	92.8	4:59:31	10:17:01	5:53:40	6:51:52	8:24:40	9:22:52	
09236	118	41	1826 May 21	15:15:25	Total	-0.2384	1.4464	315.0	206.3	86.5	12:37:55	17:52:55	13:32:16	14:32:10	15:58:40	16:58:34	
09283	118	42	1844 May 31	22:50:43	Total	-0.3050	1.3255	312.0	202.4	77.1	20:14:43	1:26:43	21:09:31	22:12:10	23:29:16	0:31:55	
09328	118	43	1862 Jun 12	6:21:03	Total	-0.3763	1.1957	308.2	197.2	62.4	3:46:57	8:55:09	4:42:27	5:49:51	6:52:15	7:59:39	
09372	118	44	1880 Jun 22	13:50:27	Total	-0.4484	1.0641	303.7	190.6	37.2	11:18:36	16:22:18	12:15:09	13:31:51	14:09:03	15:25:45	
09416	118	45	1898 Jul 03	21:17:20	Partial	-0.5228	0.9280	298.4	182.3		18:48:08	23:46:32	19:46:11			22:48:29	
09458	118	46	1916 Jul 15	4:46:07	Partial	-0.5956	0.7944	292.4	172.5		2:19:55	7:12:19	3:19:52			6:12:22	
09500	118	47	1934 Jul 26	12:15:38	Partial	-0.6681	0.6612	285.7	160.8		9:52:47	14:38:29	10:55:14			13:36:02	
09541	118	48	1952 Aug 05	19:47:55	Partial	-0.7383	0.5317	278.4	147.2		17:28:43	22:07:07	18:34:19			21:01:31	
09582	118	49	1970 Aug 17	3:24:06	Partial	-0.8053	0.4079	270.6	131.3		1:08:48	5:39:24	2:18:27			4:29:45	
09623	118	50	1988 Aug 27	11:05:29	Partial	-0.8681	0.2915	262.5	113.0		8:54:14	13:16:44	10:08:59			12:01:59	
09664	118	51	2006 Sep 07	18:52:25	Partial	-0.9262	0.1837	254.4	91.1		16:45:13	20:59:37	18:06:52			19:37:58	
09705	118	52	2024 Sep 18	2:45:25	Partial	-0.9792	0.0848	246.3	62.8		0:42:16	4:48:34	2:14:01			3:16:49	
09746	118	53	2042 Sep 29	10:45:47	Penumbral	-1.0261	-0.0031	238.5			8:46:32	12:45:02					
09786	118	54	2060 Oct 09	18:53:32	Penumbral	-1.0670	-0.0799	231.3			16:57:53	20:49:11					
09827	118	55	2078 Oct 21	3:08:03	Penumbral	-1.1021	-0.1462	224.8			1:15:39	5:00:27					
09869	118	56	2096 Oct 31	11:30:23	Penumbral	-1.1307	-0.2006	219.3			9:40:44	13:20:02					
09911	118	57	2114 Nov 12	19:59:33	Penumbral	-1.1533	-0.2439	214.9			18:12:06	21:47:00					
09953	118	58	2132 Nov 23	4:35:10	Penumbral	-1.1707	-0.2776	211.4			2:49:28	6:20:52					
09997	118	59	2150 Dec 04	13:14:45	Penumbral	-1.1848	-0.3051	208.7			11:30:24	14:59:06					
10040	118	60	2168 Dec 14	21:59:24	Penumbral	-1.1945	-0.3242	206.9			20:15:57	23:42:51					
10083	118	61	2186 Dec 26	6:46:26	Penumbral	-1.2018	-0.3389	205.7			5:03:35	8:29:17					
10126	118	62	2205 Jan 06	15:34:56	Penumbral	-1.2079	-0.3511	204.7			13:52:35	17:17:17					
10170	118	63	2223 Jan 18	0:22:32	Penumbral	-1.2144	-0.3639	203.6			22:40:44	2:04:20					
10215	118	64	2241 Jan 28	9:08:46	Penumbral	-1.2220	-0.3784	202.1			7:27:43	10:49:49					
10260	118	65	2259 Feb 08	17:51:42	Penumbral	-1.2320	-0.3971	199.9			16:11:45	19:31:39					
10306	118	66	2277 Feb 19	2:29:15	Penumbral	-1.2459	-0.4229	196.5			0:51:00	4:07:30					
10353	118	67	2295 Mar 02	11:01:08	Penumbral	-1.2642	-0.4564	191.7			9:25:17	12:36:59					
10399	118	68	2313 Mar 13	19:25:46	Penumbral	-1.2880	-0.5001	184.8			17:53:22	20:58:10					
10445	118	69	2331 Mar 25	3:42:19	Penumbral	-1.3179	-0.5548	175.5			2:14:34	5:10:04					
10491	118	70	2349 Apr 04	11:49:55	Penumbral	-1.3547	-0.6222	162.7			10:28:34	13:11:16					
10536	118	71	2367 Apr 15	19:48:55	Penumbral	-1.3977	-0.7010	145.6			18:36:07	21:01:43					
10581	118	72	2385 Apr 26	3:39:11	Penumbral	-1.4471	-0.7917	121.8			2:38:17	4:40:05					
10626	118	73	2403 May 7	11:19:39	Penumbral	-1.5036	-0.8955	85.0			10:37:09	12:02:09					

== See also ==
- List of lunar eclipses
  - List of Saros series for lunar eclipses
