= Solar Saros 125 =

Saros cycle series 125 for solar eclipses

Saros 125

Saros cycle series 125 for solar eclipses occurs at the Moon's ascending node, repeating every 18 years, 11 days, containing 73 eclipses, 40 of which are umbral (4 total, 2 hybrid, and 34 annular). The first eclipse in the series was on 4 February 1060 and the last will be on 9 April 2358. The most recent eclipse was a partial eclipse on 13 September 2015 and the next will be a partial eclipse on 23 September 2033.

The longest totality was 1 minute 11 seconds on 25 June 1294 and the longest annular was 7 minutes 23 seconds on 10 July 1907.

This solar saros is linked to Lunar Saros 118.

== Umbral eclipses ==
Umbral eclipses (annular, total and hybrid) can be further classified as either: 1) Central (two limits), 2) Central (one limit) or 3) Non-Central (one limit). The statistical distribution of these classes in Saros series 125 appears in the following table.

Classification	Number	Percent
All Umbral eclipses	40	100.00%
Central (two limits)	40	100.00%
Central (one limit)	0	0.00%
Non-central (one limit)	0	0.00%

== All eclipses ==
Note: Dates are given in the Julian calendar prior to 15 October 1582, and in the Gregorian calendar after that.

Saros	Member	Date	Time (Greatest) UTC	Type	Location Lat, Long	Gamma	Mag.	Width (km)	Duration (min:sec)	Ref
125	1	February 4, 1060	21:21:56	Partial	62.1N 167.8E	1.5334	0.008			
125	2	February 15, 1078	5:47:57	Partial	61.6N 32E	1.5158	0.0407			
125	3	February 26, 1096	14:07:35	Partial	61.3N 102W	1.4936	0.082			
125	4	March 8, 1114	22:17:27	Partial	61.1N 126.5E	1.4643	0.1367			
125	5	March 19, 1132	6:19:27	Partial	61.1N 3.1W	1.4291	0.2024			
125	6	March 30, 1150	14:11:34	Partial	61.2N 130.1W	1.3867	0.2819			
125	7	April 9, 1168	21:56:35	Partial	61.5N 104.6E	1.339	0.3713			
125	8	April 21, 1186	5:32:46	Partial	62N 18.6W	1.2847	0.4732			
125	9	May 1, 1204	13:01:38	Partial	62.5N 140.1W	1.225	0.5852			
125	10	May 12, 1222	20:24:03	Partial	63.2N 99.9E	1.1607	0.7054			
125	11	May 23, 1240	3:41:19	Partial	64N 19W	1.0929	0.8316			
125	12	June 3, 1258	10:54:19	Partial	64.9N 137.1W	1.022	0.9628			
125	13	June 13, 1276	18:03:40	Total	82.2N 135.2E	0.949	1.0202	226	1m 7s	
125	14	June 25, 1294	1:11:53	Total	84.5N 153.7E	0.8757	1.0195	140	1m 11s	
125	15	July 5, 1312	8:19:23	Total	75.4N 68.1E	0.8028	1.0171	99	1m 8s	
125	16	July 16, 1330	15:26:58	Total	66.5N 35.7W	0.7307	1.0139	70	1m 0s	
125	17	July 26, 1348	22:37:09	Hybrid	58N 143.3W	0.6616	1.0098	45	0m 46s	
125	18	August 7, 1366	5:50:23	Hybrid	49.7N 107E	0.5958	1.0051	22	0m 26s	
125	19	August 17, 1384	13:09:06	Annular	41.7N 4.5W	0.5354	0.9999	1	0m 1s	
125	20	August 28, 1402	20:31:39	Annular	34N 117.4W	0.479	0.9943	23	0m 33s	
125	21	September 8, 1420	4:02:09	Annular	26.7N 127.7E	0.4301	0.9885	45	1m 10s	
125	22	September 19, 1438	11:38:08	Annular	19.8N 11.4E	0.3864	0.9826	66	1m 51s	
125	23	September 29, 1456	19:22:26	Annular	13.5N 106.7W	0.3503	0.9768	88	2m 36s	
125	24	October 11, 1474	3:12:17	Annular	7.8N 134.1E	0.3195	0.9711	109	3m 22s	
125	25	October 21, 1492	11:10:36	Annular	2.8N 13.1E	0.2964	0.9657	129	4m 8s	
125	26	November 1, 1510	19:13:50	Annular	1.5S 108.7W	0.2781	0.9607	148	4m 54s	
125	27	November 12, 1528	3:22:58	Annular	4.9S 128.4E	0.2653	0.9562	166	5m 36s	
125	28	November 23, 1546	11:35:42	Annular	7.3S 4.9E	0.2561	0.9521	181	6m 13s	
125	29	December 3, 1564	19:52:06	Annular	8.8S 119.2W	0.2504	0.9487	195	6m 42s	
125	30	December 25, 1582	4:08:39	Annular	9.4S 116.8E	0.2457	0.9459	206	7m 2s	
125	31	January 4, 1601	12:24:38	Annular	9.1S 7W	0.241	0.9437	214	7m 13s	
125	32	January 15, 1619	20:38:07	Annular	8.1S 130.4W	0.2349	0.9422	220	7m 16s	
125	33	January 26, 1637	4:48:32	Annular	6.4S 107E	0.2265	0.9412	223	7m 12s	
125	34	February 6, 1655	12:51:54	Annular	4.3S 14W	0.2129	0.9408	224	7m 3s	
125	35	February 16, 1673	20:49:18	Annular	1.8S 133.5W	0.195	0.9409	223	6m 52s	
125	36	February 28, 1691	4:37:41	Annular	0.8N 109.3E	0.1701	0.9414	220	6m 40s	
125	37	March 11, 1709	12:18:35	Annular	3.4N 5.9W	0.1394	0.9422	216	6m 29s	
125	38	March 22, 1727	19:47:55	Annular	5.7N 118W	0.0996	0.9432	211	6m 20s	
125	39	April 2, 1745	3:09:18	Annular	7.7N 132.2E	0.0536	0.9444	205	6m 13s	
125	40	April 13, 1763	10:19:31	Annular	9N 25.3E	-0.001	0.9455	201	6m 11s	
125	41	April 23, 1781	17:21:26	Annular	9.7N 79.2W	-0.062	0.9467	197	6m 13s	
125	42	May 5, 1799	0:13:08	Annular	9.3N 178.9E	-0.131	0.9476	194	6m 20s	
125	43	May 16, 1817	6:58:14	Annular	7.9N 78.5E	-0.2049	0.9483	194	6m 30s	
125	44	May 27, 1835	13:35:42	Annular	5.3N 20.2W	-0.2846	0.9486	196	6m 44s	
125	45	June 6, 1853	20:07:21	Annular	1.5N 117.9W	-0.3686	0.9486	203	6m 59s	
125	46	June 18, 1871	2:35:01	Annular	3.5S 144.7E	-0.455	0.9481	214	7m 14s	
125	47	June 28, 1889	9:00:00	Annular	9.6S 47.3E	-0.5431	0.9471	232	7m 22s	
125	48	July 10, 1907	15:24:32	Annular	16.9S 50.9W	-0.6313	0.9456	258	7m 23s	
125	49	July 20, 1925	21:48:42	Annular	25.3S 150W	-0.7193	0.9436	300	7m 15s	
125	50	August 1, 1943	4:16:13	Annular	34.8S 108.6E	-0.8041	0.9409	367	6m 59s	
125	51	August 11, 1961	10:46:47	Annular	45.8S 4E	-0.8859	0.9375	499	6m 35s	
125	52	August 22, 1979	17:22:38	Annular	59.6S 108.5W	-0.9632	0.9329	953	6m 3s	
125	53	September 2, 1997	0:04:48	Partial	71.8S 114.3E	-1.0352	0.8988			
125	54	September 13, 2015	6:55:19	Partial	72.1S 2.3W	-1.1004	0.7875			
125	55	September 23, 2033	13:54:31	Partial	72.2S 121.2W	-1.1583	0.689			
125	56	October 4, 2051	21:02:14	Partial	72S 117.7E	-1.2094	0.6024			
125	57	October 15, 2069	4:19:56	Partial	71.6S 5.5W	-1.2524	0.5298			
125	58	October 26, 2087	11:46:57	Partial	71S 130.5W	-1.2882	0.4696			
125	59	November 6, 2105	19:23:02	Partial	70.2S 102.7E	-1.3168	0.4217			
125	60	November 18, 2123	3:07:26	Partial	69.3S 25.5W	-1.3389	0.3848			
125	61	November 28, 2141	10:59:33	Partial	68.2S 155W	-1.3552	0.3577			
125	62	December 9, 2159	18:58:33	Partial	67.2S 74.4E	-1.3663	0.3392			
125	63	December 20, 2177	3:01:35	Partial	66.1S 56.8W	-1.3747	0.3251			
125	64	December 31, 2195	11:09:22	Partial	65.1S 171.4E	-1.3797	0.3166			
125	65	January 11, 2214	19:17:52	Partial	64.1S 39.7E	-1.3848	0.3078			
125	66	January 23, 2232	3:27:39	Partial	63.3S 91.9W	-1.3891	0.3001			
125	67	February 2, 2250	11:34:06	Partial	62.5S 137.6E	-1.3969	0.2864			
125	68	February 13, 2268	19:39:32	Partial	61.9S 7.5E	-1.4059	0.2703			
125	69	February 24, 2286	3:39:23	Partial	61.5S 121W	-1.4203	0.2448			
125	70	March 7, 2304	11:34:24	Partial	61.2S 111.8E	-1.4389	0.2118			
125	71	March 18, 2322	19:21:51	Partial	61.1S 13.5W	-1.464	0.1671			
125	72	March 29, 2340	3:03:37	Partial	61.2S 137.3W	-1.4941	0.1131			
125	73	April 9, 2358	10:37:39	Partial	61.4S 100.7E	-1.5309	0.0468			
