= 1988 lunar eclipse =

Two partial lunar eclipses occurred in 1988:

- 3 March 1988 lunar eclipse
- 27 August 1988 lunar eclipse

== See also ==
- List of 20th-century lunar eclipses
- Lists of lunar eclipses
