= September 1977 lunar eclipse =

Penumbral lunar eclipse September 27, 1977

- Penumbral eclipse
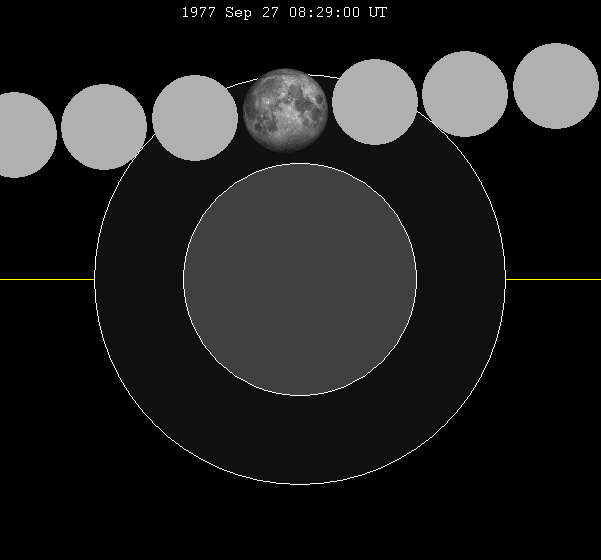
- The Moon's hourly motion shown right to left
- Date: September 27, 1977
- Gamma: 1.0768
- Magnitude: −0.1361
- Saros cycle: 117 (50 of 72)
- Penumbral: 257 minutes, 30 seconds
Contacts (UTC)
- P1: 6:20:33
- Greatest: 8:29:20
- P4: 10:38:03

A penumbral lunar eclipse occurred at the Moon’s descending node of orbit on Tuesday, September 27, 1977, with an umbral magnitude of −0.1361. A lunar eclipse occurs when the Moon moves into the Earth's shadow, causing the Moon to be darkened. A penumbral lunar eclipse occurs when part or all of the Moon's near side passes into the Earth's penumbra. Unlike a solar eclipse, which can only be viewed from a relatively small area of the world, a lunar eclipse may be viewed from anywhere on the night side of Earth. Occurring about 6.25 days before apogee (on October 3, 1977, at 14:45 UTC), the Moon's apparent diameter was smaller.

== Visibility ==
The eclipse was completely visible over North America, northwestern South America, and the central and eastern Pacific Ocean, seen rising over east and northeast Asia and Australia and setting over much of South America and the Atlantic Ocean.

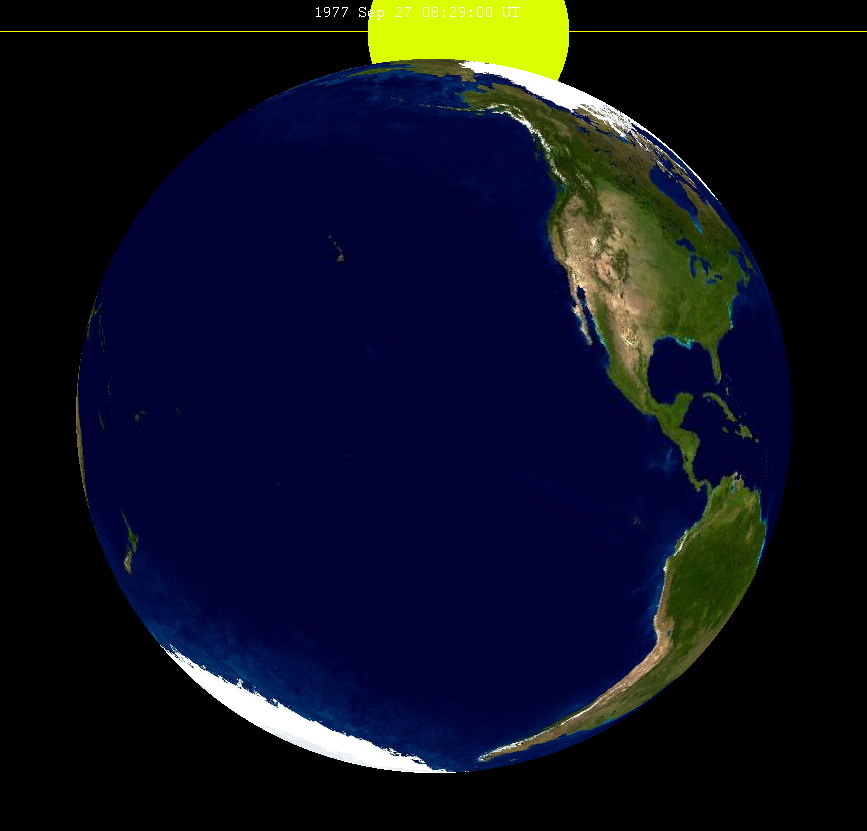
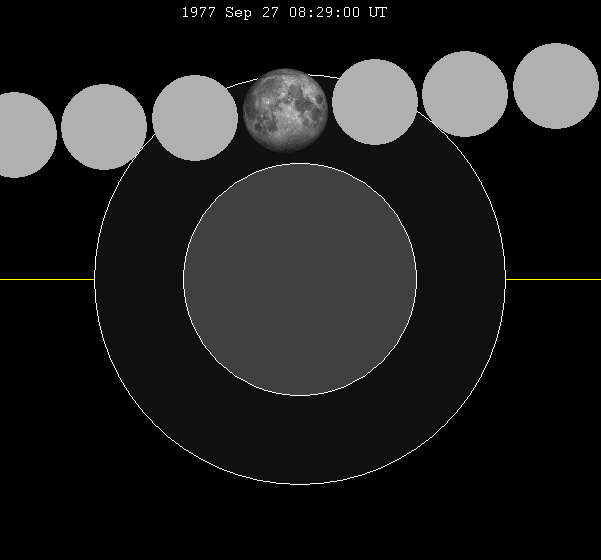

== Eclipse details ==
Shown below is a table displaying details about this particular lunar eclipse. It describes various parameters pertaining to this eclipse.

September 27, 1977 Lunar Eclipse Parameters
Parameter	Value
Penumbral Magnitude	0.90076
Umbral Magnitude	−0.13605
Gamma	1.07682
Sun Right Ascension	12h15m08.1s
Sun Declination	-01°38'19.9"
Sun Semi-Diameter	15'57.6"
Sun Equatorial Horizontal Parallax	08.8"
Moon Right Ascension	00h13m53.7s
Moon Declination	+02°36'15.1"
Moon Semi-Diameter	15'23.6"
Moon Equatorial Horizontal Parallax	0°56'29.6"
ΔT	48.3 s

== Eclipse season ==
This eclipse is part of an eclipse season, a period, roughly every six months, when eclipses occur. Only two (or occasionally three) eclipse seasons occur each year, and each season lasts about 35 days and repeats just short of six months (173 days) later; thus two full eclipse seasons always occur each year. Either two or three eclipses happen each eclipse season. In the sequence below, each eclipse is separated by a fortnight.

Eclipse season of September–October 1977
September 27 Descending node (full moon)	October 12 Ascending node (new moon)
Penumbral lunar eclipse Lunar Saros 117	Total solar eclipse Solar Saros 143

== Related eclipses ==
=== Eclipses in 1977 ===
- A partial lunar eclipse on April 4.
- An annular solar eclipse on April 18.
- A penumbral lunar eclipse on September 27.
- A total solar eclipse on October 12.

=== Metonic ===
- Preceded by: Lunar eclipse of December 10, 1973
- Followed by: Lunar eclipse of July 17, 1981

=== Tzolkinex ===
- Preceded by: Lunar eclipse of August 17, 1970
- Followed by: Lunar eclipse of November 8, 1984

=== Half-Saros ===
- Preceded by: Solar eclipse of September 22, 1968
- Followed by: Solar eclipse of October 3, 1986

=== Tritos ===
- Preceded by: Lunar eclipse of October 29, 1966
- Followed by: Lunar eclipse of August 27, 1988

=== Lunar Saros 117 ===
- Preceded by: Lunar eclipse of September 17, 1959
- Followed by: Lunar eclipse of October 8, 1995

=== Inex ===
- Preceded by: Lunar eclipse of October 18, 1948
- Followed by: Lunar eclipse of September 7, 2006

=== Triad ===
- Preceded by: Lunar eclipse of November 26, 1890
- Followed by: Lunar eclipse of July 28, 2064

=== Lunar eclipses of 1977–1980 ===
This eclipse is a member of a semester series. An eclipse in a semester series of lunar eclipses repeats approximately every 177 days and 4 hours (a semester) at alternating nodes of the Moon's orbit.

The penumbral lunar eclipse on July 27, 1980 occurs in the next lunar year eclipse set.

Lunar eclipse series sets from 1977 to 1980
Ascending node				Descending node			
Saros	Date Viewing	Type Chart	Gamma	Saros	Date Viewing	Type Chart	Gamma
112	1977 Apr 04	Partial	−0.9148	117	1977 Sep 27	Penumbral	1.0768
122	1978 Mar 24	Total	−0.2140	127	1978 Sep 16	Total	0.2951
132	1979 Mar 13	Partial	0.5254	137	1979 Sep 06	Total	−0.4305
142	1980 Mar 01	Penumbral	1.2270	147	1980 Aug 26	Penumbral	−1.1608

=== Saros 117 ===
This eclipse is a part of Saros series 117, repeating every 18 years, 11 days, and containing 71 events. The series started with a penumbral lunar eclipse on April 3, 1094. It contains partial eclipses from June 29, 1238 through September 23, 1382; total eclipses from October 3, 1400 through June 21, 1815; and a second set of partial eclipses from July 2, 1833 through September 5, 1941. The series ends at member 71 as a penumbral eclipse on May 15, 2356.

The longest duration of totality was produced by member 35 at 105 minutes, 43 seconds on April 17, 1707. All eclipses in this series occur at the Moon’s descending node of orbit.

Greatest	First			
The greatest eclipse of the series occurred on 1707 Apr 17, lasting 105 minutes, 43 seconds.	Penumbral	Partial	Total	Central
The greatest eclipse of the series occurred on 1707 Apr 17, lasting 105 minutes, 43 seconds.	1094 Apr 03	1238 Jun 29	1400 Oct 03	1563 Jan 09
The greatest eclipse of the series occurred on 1707 Apr 17, lasting 105 minutes, 43 seconds.	Last			
The greatest eclipse of the series occurred on 1707 Apr 17, lasting 105 minutes, 43 seconds.	Central	Total	Partial	Penumbral
The greatest eclipse of the series occurred on 1707 Apr 17, lasting 105 minutes, 43 seconds.	1761 May 18	1815 Jun 21	1941 Sep 05	2356 May 15

Eclipses are tabulated in three columns; every third eclipse in the same column is one exeligmos apart, so they all cast shadows over approximately the same parts of the Earth.

Series members 41–62 occur between 1801 and 2200:
41	42	43
1815 Jun 21	1833 Jul 02	1851 Jul 13
44	45	46
1869 Jul 23	1887 Aug 03	1905 Aug 15
47	48	49
1923 Aug 26	1941 Sep 05	1959 Sep 17
50	51	52
1977 Sep 27	1995 Oct 08	2013 Oct 18
53	54	55
2031 Oct 30	2049 Nov 09	2067 Nov 21
56	57	58
2085 Dec 01	2103 Dec 13	2121 Dec 24
59	60	61
2140 Jan 04	2158 Jan 14	2176 Jan 26
62
2194 Feb 05

=== Tritos series ===
This eclipse is a part of a tritos cycle, repeating at alternating nodes every 135 synodic months (≈ 3986.63 days, or 11 years minus 1 month). Their appearance and longitude are irregular due to a lack of synchronization with the anomalistic month (period of perigee), but groupings of 3 tritos cycles (≈ 33 years minus 3 months) come close (≈ 434.044 anomalistic months), so eclipses are similar in these groupings.

Series members between 1801 and 2200
1803 Feb 06 (Saros 101)	1814 Jan 06 (Saros 102)	1824 Dec 06 (Saros 103)		1846 Oct 04 (Saros 105)
1857 Sep 04 (Saros 106)	1868 Aug 03 (Saros 107)	1879 Jul 03 (Saros 108)	1890 Jun 03 (Saros 109)	1901 May 03 (Saros 110)
1912 Apr 01 (Saros 111)	1923 Mar 03 (Saros 112)	1934 Jan 30 (Saros 113)	1944 Dec 29 (Saros 114)	1955 Nov 29 (Saros 115)
1966 Oct 29 (Saros 116)	1977 Sep 27 (Saros 117)	1988 Aug 27 (Saros 118)	1999 Jul 28 (Saros 119)	2010 Jun 26 (Saros 120)
2021 May 26 (Saros 121)	2032 Apr 25 (Saros 122)	2043 Mar 25 (Saros 123)	2054 Feb 22 (Saros 124)	2065 Jan 22 (Saros 125)
2075 Dec 22 (Saros 126)	2086 Nov 20 (Saros 127)	2097 Oct 21 (Saros 128)	2108 Sep 20 (Saros 129)	2119 Aug 20 (Saros 130)
2130 Jul 21 (Saros 131)	2141 Jun 19 (Saros 132)	2152 May 18 (Saros 133)	2163 Apr 19 (Saros 134)	2174 Mar 18 (Saros 135)
2185 Feb 14 (Saros 136)	2196 Jan 15 (Saros 137)			

=== Inex series ===
This eclipse is a part of the long period inex cycle, repeating at alternating nodes, every 358 synodic months (≈ 10,571.95 days, or 29 years minus 20 days). Their appearance and longitude are irregular due to a lack of synchronization with the anomalistic month (period of perigee). However, groupings of 3 inex cycles (≈ 87 years minus 2 months) comes close (≈ 1,151.02 anomalistic months), so eclipses are similar in these groupings.

Series members between 1801 and 2200
1804 Jan 26 (Saros 111)	1833 Jan 06 (Saros 112)	1861 Dec 17 (Saros 113)
1890 Nov 26 (Saros 114)	1919 Nov 07 (Saros 115)	1948 Oct 18 (Saros 116)
1977 Sep 27 (Saros 117)	2006 Sep 07 (Saros 118)	2035 Aug 19 (Saros 119)
2064 Jul 28 (Saros 120)	2093 Jul 08 (Saros 121)	2122 Jun 20 (Saros 122)
2151 May 30 (Saros 123)	2180 May 09 (Saros 124)	

=== Half-Saros cycle ===
A lunar eclipse will be preceded and followed by solar eclipses by 9 years and 5.5 days (a half saros). This lunar eclipse is related to two solar eclipses of Solar Saros 124.

September 22, 1968	October 3, 1986

== See also ==
- List of lunar eclipses
- List of 20th-century lunar eclipses
