= October 1995 lunar eclipse =

Penumbral lunar eclipse October 8, 1995

- Penumbral eclipse
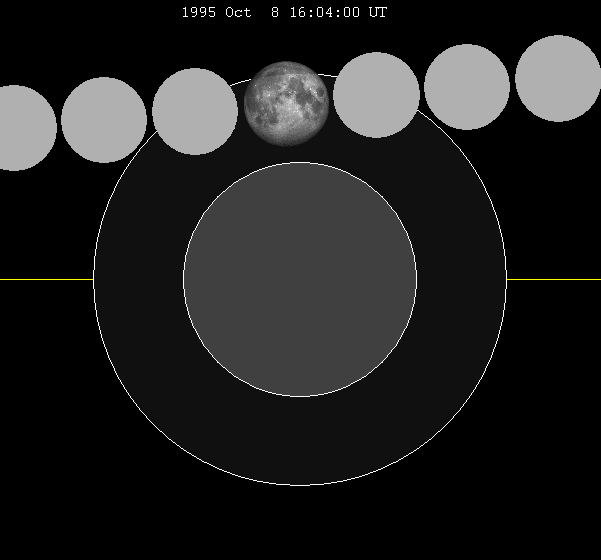
- The Moon's hourly motion shown right to left
- Date: October 8, 1995
- Gamma: 1.1179
- Magnitude: −0.2115
- Saros cycle: 117 (51 of 72)
- Penumbral: 247 minutes, 37 seconds
Contacts (UTC)
- P1: 14:00:20
- Greatest: 16:04:11
- P4: 18:07:56

A penumbral lunar eclipse occurred at the Moon’s descending node of orbit on Sunday, October 8, 1995, with an umbral magnitude of −0.2115. A lunar eclipse occurs when the Moon moves into the Earth's shadow, causing the Moon to be darkened. A penumbral lunar eclipse occurs when part or all of the Moon's near side passes into the Earth's penumbra. Unlike a solar eclipse, which can only be viewed from a relatively small area of the world, a lunar eclipse may be viewed from anywhere on the night side of Earth. Occurring about 6.5 days before apogee (on October 15, 1995, at 3:05 UTC), the Moon's apparent diameter was smaller.

== Visibility ==
The eclipse was completely visible over Asia and Australia, seen rising over much of Africa and Europe and setting over northwestern North America and the central Pacific Ocean.

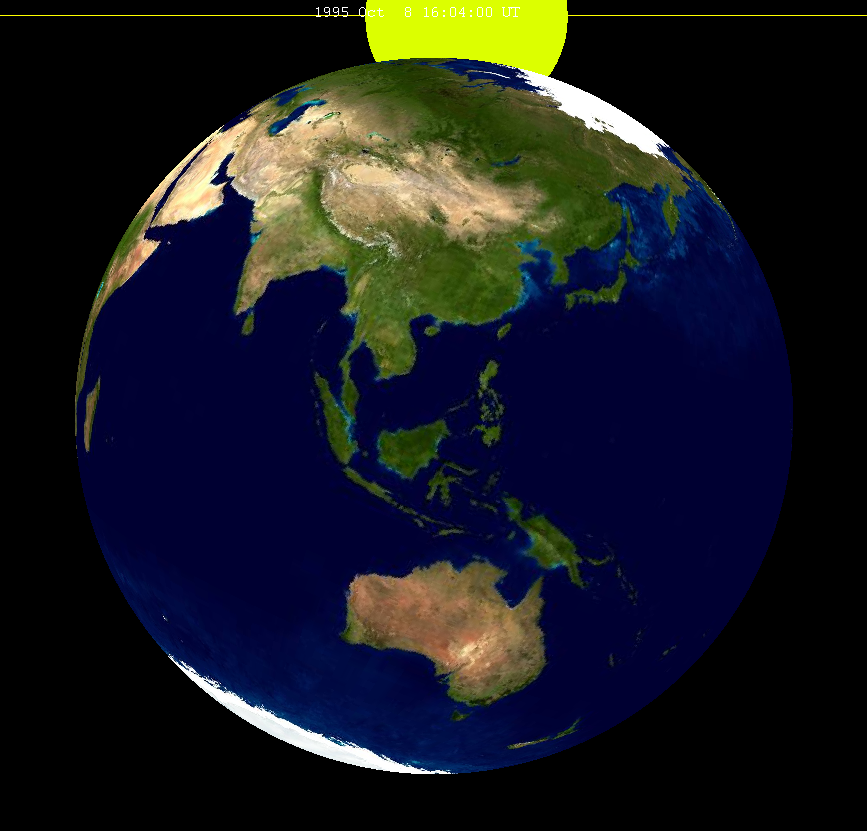
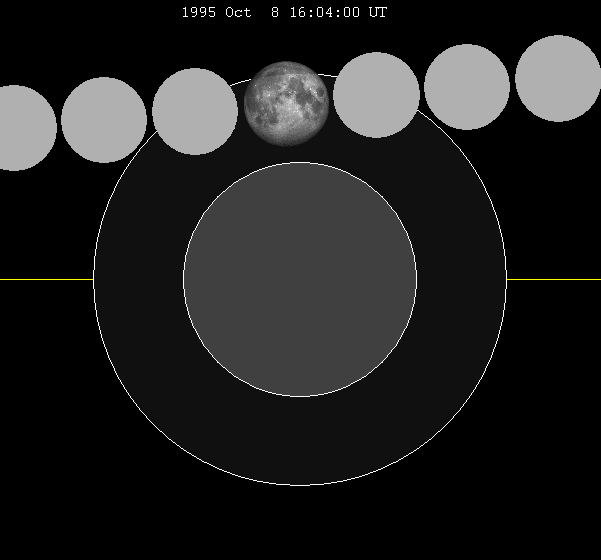

== Eclipse details ==
Shown below is a table displaying details about this particular lunar eclipse. It describes various parameters pertaining to this eclipse.

October 8, 1995 Lunar Eclipse Parameters
Parameter	Value
Penumbral Magnitude	0.82527
Umbral Magnitude	−0.21146
Gamma	1.11794
Sun Right Ascension	12h54m53.0s
Sun Declination	-05°52'15.5"
Sun Semi-Diameter	16'00.5"
Sun Equatorial Horizontal Parallax	08.8"
Moon Right Ascension	00h53m37.8s
Moon Declination	+06°52'47.3"
Moon Semi-Diameter	15'26.5"
Moon Equatorial Horizontal Parallax	0°56'40.2"
ΔT	61.4 s

== Eclipse season ==
This eclipse is part of an eclipse season, a period, roughly every six months, when eclipses occur. Only two (or occasionally three) eclipse seasons occur each year, and each season lasts about 35 days and repeats just short of six months (173 days) later; thus two full eclipse seasons always occur each year. Either two or three eclipses happen each eclipse season. In the sequence below, each eclipse is separated by a fortnight.

Eclipse season of October 1995
October 8 Descending node (full moon)	October 24 Ascending node (new moon)
Penumbral lunar eclipse Lunar Saros 117	Total solar eclipse Solar Saros 143

== Related eclipses ==
=== Eclipses in 1995 ===
- A partial lunar eclipse on April 15.
- An annular solar eclipse on April 29.
- A penumbral lunar eclipse on October 8.
- A total solar eclipse on October 24.

=== Metonic ===
- Preceded by: Lunar eclipse of December 21, 1991
- Followed by: Lunar eclipse of July 28, 1999

=== Tzolkinex ===
- Preceded by: Lunar eclipse of August 27, 1988
- Followed by: Lunar eclipse of November 20, 2002

=== Half-Saros ===
- Preceded by: Solar eclipse of October 3, 1986
- Followed by: Solar eclipse of October 14, 2004

=== Tritos ===
- Preceded by: Lunar eclipse of November 8, 1984
- Followed by: Lunar eclipse of September 7, 2006

=== Lunar Saros 117 ===
- Preceded by: Lunar eclipse of September 27, 1977
- Followed by: Lunar eclipse of October 18, 2013

=== Inex ===
- Preceded by: Lunar eclipse of October 29, 1966
- Followed by: Lunar eclipse of September 18, 2024

=== Triad ===
- Preceded by: Lunar eclipse of December 7, 1908
- Followed by: Lunar eclipse of August 8, 2082

=== Lunar eclipses of 1995–1998 ===
This eclipse is a member of a semester series. An eclipse in a semester series of lunar eclipses repeats approximately every 177 days and 4 hours (a semester) at alternating nodes of the Moon's orbit.

The penumbral lunar eclipse on August 8, 1998 occurs in the next lunar year eclipse set.

Lunar eclipse series sets from 1995 to 1998
Ascending node				Descending node			
Saros	Date Viewing	Type Chart	Gamma	Saros	Date Viewing	Type Chart	Gamma
112	1995 Apr 15	Partial	−0.9594	117	1995 Oct 08	Penumbral	1.1179
122	1996 Apr 04	Total	−0.2534	127	1996 Sep 27	Total	0.3426
132	1997 Mar 24	Partial	0.4899	137	1997 Sep 16	Total	−0.3768
142	1998 Mar 13	Penumbral	1.1964	147	1998 Sep 06	Penumbral	−1.1058

=== Saros 117 ===
This eclipse is a part of Saros series 117, repeating every 18 years, 11 days, and containing 71 events. The series started with a penumbral lunar eclipse on April 3, 1094. It contains partial eclipses from June 29, 1238 through September 23, 1382; total eclipses from October 3, 1400 through June 21, 1815; and a second set of partial eclipses from July 2, 1833 through September 5, 1941. The series ends at member 71 as a penumbral eclipse on May 15, 2356.

The longest duration of totality was produced by member 35 at 105 minutes, 43 seconds on April 17, 1707. All eclipses in this series occur at the Moon’s descending node of orbit.

Greatest	First			
The greatest eclipse of the series occurred on 1707 Apr 17, lasting 105 minutes, 43 seconds.	Penumbral	Partial	Total	Central
The greatest eclipse of the series occurred on 1707 Apr 17, lasting 105 minutes, 43 seconds.	1094 Apr 03	1238 Jun 29	1400 Oct 03	1563 Jan 09
The greatest eclipse of the series occurred on 1707 Apr 17, lasting 105 minutes, 43 seconds.	Last			
The greatest eclipse of the series occurred on 1707 Apr 17, lasting 105 minutes, 43 seconds.	Central	Total	Partial	Penumbral
The greatest eclipse of the series occurred on 1707 Apr 17, lasting 105 minutes, 43 seconds.	1761 May 18	1815 Jun 21	1941 Sep 05	2356 May 15

Eclipses are tabulated in three columns; every third eclipse in the same column is one exeligmos apart, so they all cast shadows over approximately the same parts of the Earth.

Series members 41–62 occur between 1801 and 2200:
41	42	43
1815 Jun 21	1833 Jul 02	1851 Jul 13
44	45	46
1869 Jul 23	1887 Aug 03	1905 Aug 15
47	48	49
1923 Aug 26	1941 Sep 05	1959 Sep 17
50	51	52
1977 Sep 27	1995 Oct 08	2013 Oct 18
53	54	55
2031 Oct 30	2049 Nov 09	2067 Nov 21
56	57	58
2085 Dec 01	2103 Dec 13	2121 Dec 24
59	60	61
2140 Jan 04	2158 Jan 14	2176 Jan 26
62
2194 Feb 05

=== Tritos series ===
This eclipse is a part of a tritos cycle, repeating at alternating nodes every 135 synodic months (≈ 3986.63 days, or 11 years minus 1 month). Their appearance and longitude are irregular due to a lack of synchronization with the anomalistic month (period of perigee), but groupings of 3 tritos cycles (≈ 33 years minus 3 months) come close (≈ 434.044 anomalistic months), so eclipses are similar in these groupings.

Series members between 1801 and 2200
1810 Mar 21 (Saros 100)	1821 Feb 17 (Saros 101)	1832 Jan 17 (Saros 102)	1842 Dec 17 (Saros 103)	
1864 Oct 15 (Saros 105)	1875 Sep 15 (Saros 106)	1886 Aug 14 (Saros 107)	1897 Jul 14 (Saros 108)	1908 Jun 14 (Saros 109)
1919 May 15 (Saros 110)	1930 Apr 13 (Saros 111)	1941 Mar 13 (Saros 112)	1952 Feb 11 (Saros 113)	1963 Jan 09 (Saros 114)
1973 Dec 10 (Saros 115)	1984 Nov 08 (Saros 116)	1995 Oct 08 (Saros 117)	2006 Sep 07 (Saros 118)	2017 Aug 07 (Saros 119)
2028 Jul 06 (Saros 120)	2039 Jun 06 (Saros 121)	2050 May 06 (Saros 122)	2061 Apr 04 (Saros 123)	2072 Mar 04 (Saros 124)
2083 Feb 02 (Saros 125)	2094 Jan 01 (Saros 126)	2104 Dec 02 (Saros 127)	2115 Nov 02 (Saros 128)	2126 Oct 01 (Saros 129)
2137 Aug 30 (Saros 130)	2148 Jul 31 (Saros 131)	2159 Jun 30 (Saros 132)	2170 May 30 (Saros 133)	2181 Apr 29 (Saros 134)
2192 Mar 28 (Saros 135)

=== Inex series ===
This eclipse is a part of the long period inex cycle, repeating at alternating nodes, every 358 synodic months (≈ 10,571.95 days, or 29 years minus 20 days). Their appearance and longitude are irregular due to a lack of synchronization with the anomalistic month (period of perigee). However, groupings of 3 inex cycles (≈ 87 years minus 2 months) comes close (≈ 1,151.02 anomalistic months), so eclipses are similar in these groupings.

Series members between 1801 and 2200
1822 Feb 06 (Saros 111)	1851 Jan 17 (Saros 112)	1879 Dec 28 (Saros 113)
1908 Dec 07 (Saros 114)	1937 Nov 18 (Saros 115)	1966 Oct 29 (Saros 116)
1995 Oct 08 (Saros 117)	2024 Sep 18 (Saros 118)	2053 Aug 29 (Saros 119)
2082 Aug 08 (Saros 120)	2111 Jul 21 (Saros 121)	2140 Jun 30 (Saros 122)
2169 Jun 09 (Saros 123)	2198 May 20 (Saros 124)	

=== Half-Saros cycle ===
A lunar eclipse will be preceded and followed by solar eclipses by 9 years and 5.5 days (a half saros). This lunar eclipse is related to two solar eclipses of Solar Saros 124.

October 3, 1986	October 14, 2004

== See also ==
- List of lunar eclipses
- List of 20th-century lunar eclipses
