= September 2006 lunar eclipse =

Partial lunar eclipse 7 September 2006

- Partial eclipse
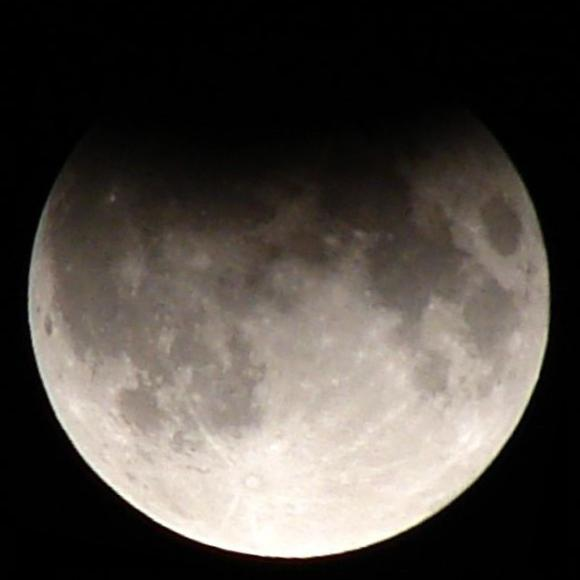
- Partiality as viewed from Bucharest, Romania, 18:37 UTC
- Date: September 7, 2006
- Gamma: −0.9262
- Magnitude: 0.1837
- Saros cycle: 118 (51 of 74)
- Partiality: 91 minutes, 6 seconds
- Penumbral: 254 minutes, 23 seconds
Contacts (UTC)
- P1: 16:44:07
- U1: 18:05:47
- Greatest: 18:51:19
- U4: 19:36:53
- P4: 20:58:30

A partial lunar eclipse occurred at the Moon's ascending node of orbit on Thursday, September 7, 2006, with an umbral magnitude of 0.1837. A lunar eclipse occurs when the Moon moves into the Earth's shadow, causing the Moon to be darkened. A partial lunar eclipse occurs when one part of the Moon is in the Earth's umbra, while the other part is in the Earth's penumbra. Unlike a solar eclipse, which can only be viewed from a relatively small area of the world, a lunar eclipse may be viewed from anywhere on the night side of Earth. Occurring only about 4 hours before perigee (on September 7, 2006, at 23:00 UTC), the Moon's apparent diameter was larger.

== Visibility ==
The eclipse was completely visible over Asia, east Africa, eastern Europe and western Australia, seen rising over west Africa and western Europe and setting over eastern Australia and the western Pacific Ocean.

Hourly motion shown right to left	The Moon's hourly motion across the Earth's shadow in the constellation of Aquarius.
Visibility map

== Images ==
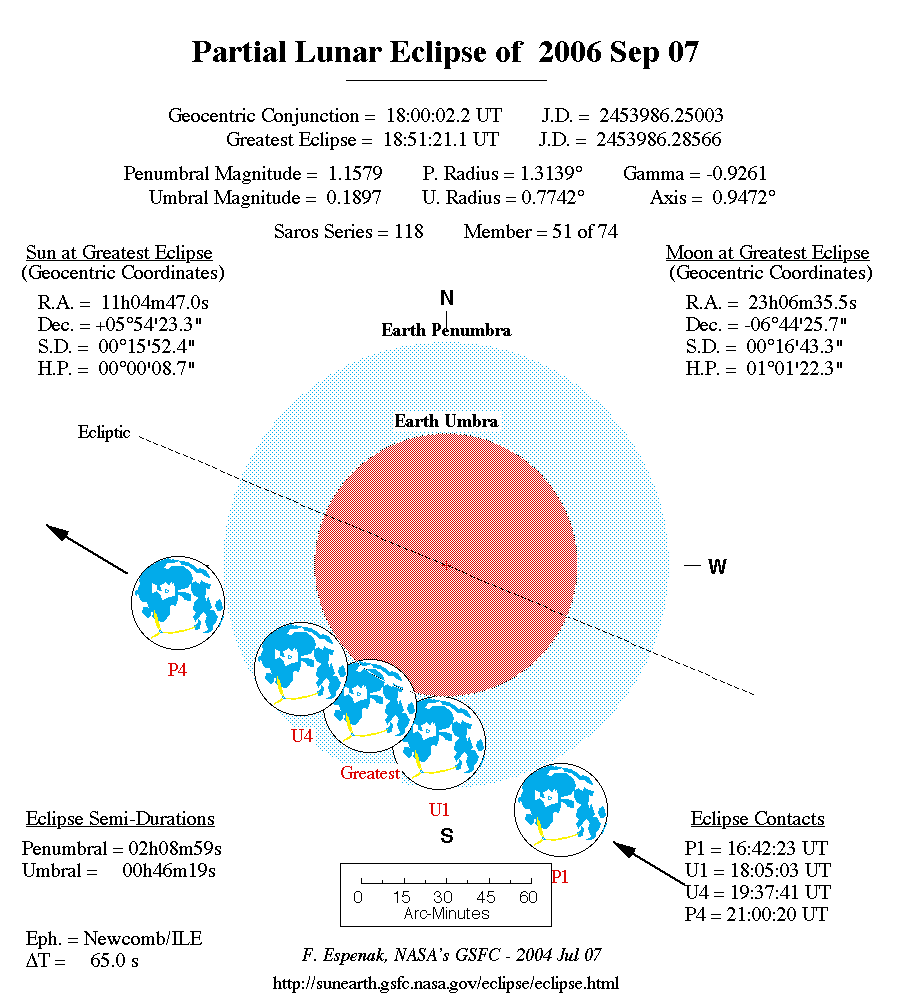
NASA chart of the eclipse

== Gallery ==
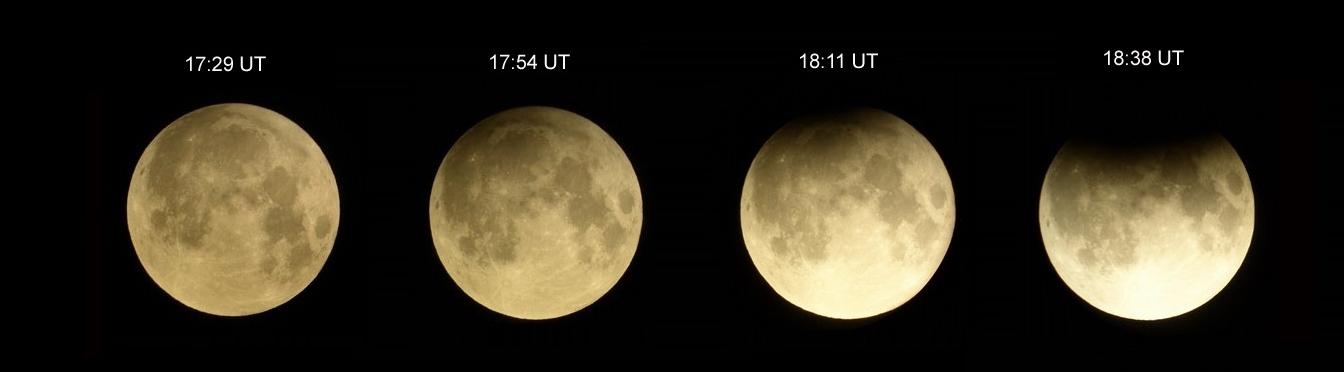
Degania A, Israel

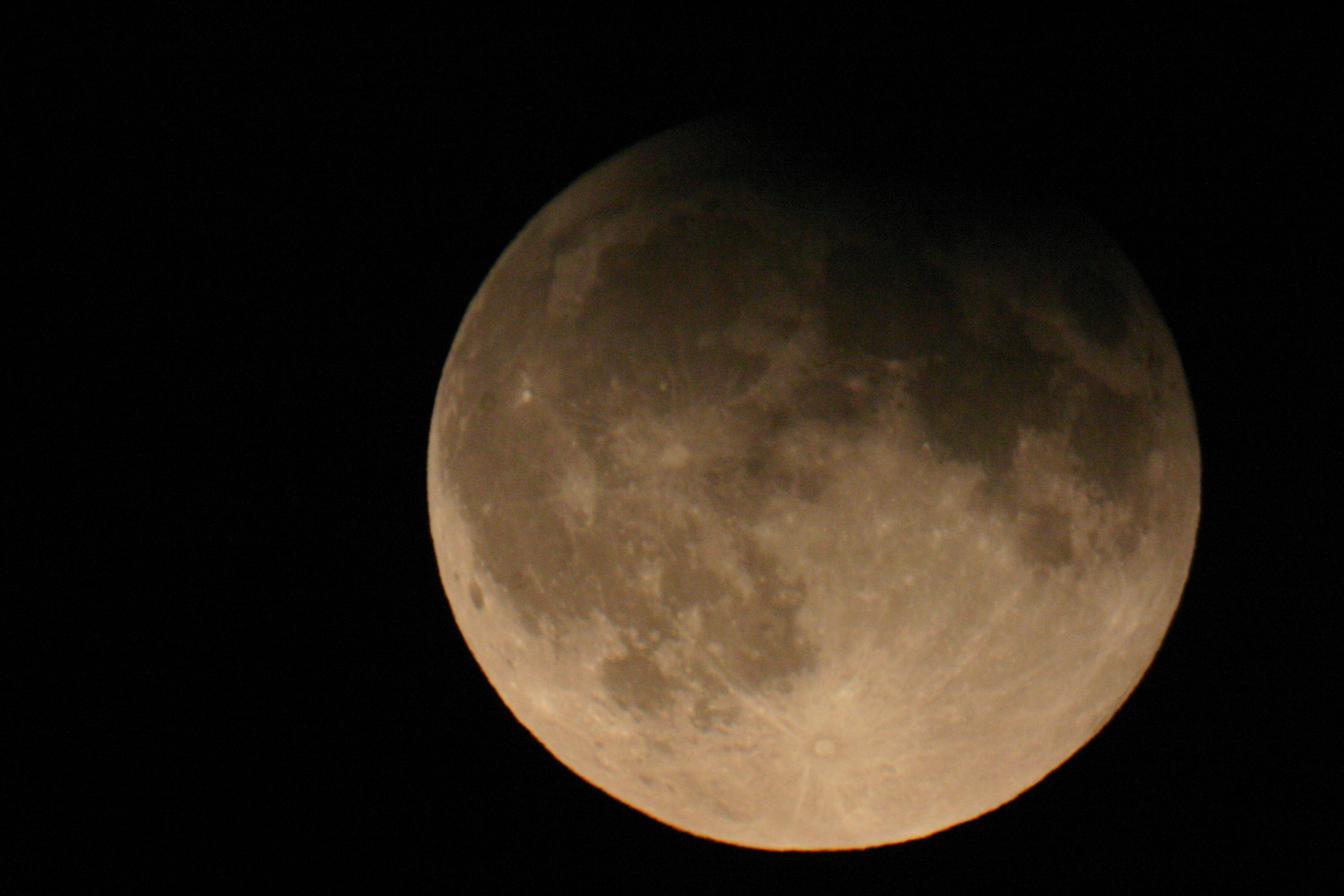
North Wales, UK

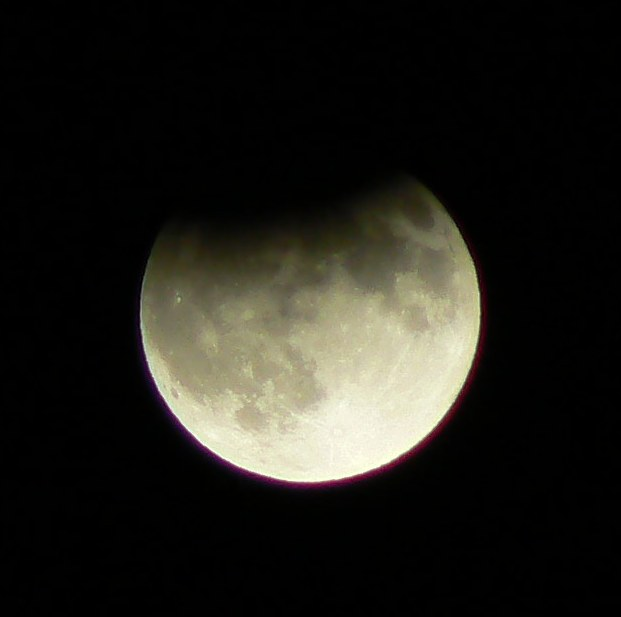
Sofia, Bulgaria

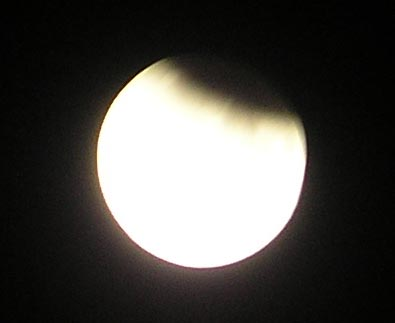
Jaipur, India

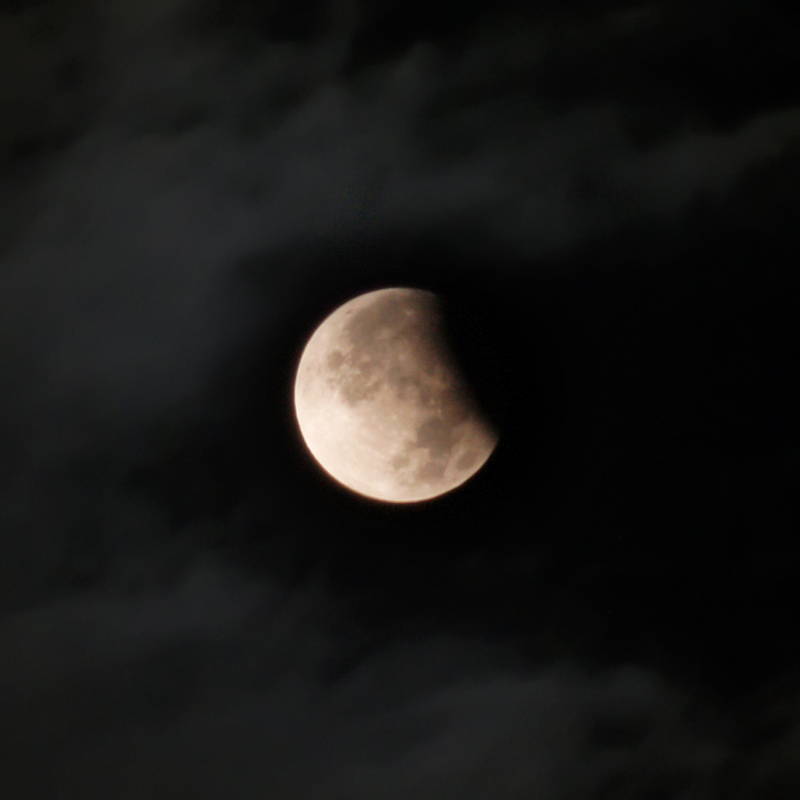
Shizuoka City, Japan

== Eclipse details ==
Shown below is a table displaying details about this particular lunar eclipse. It describes various parameters pertaining to this eclipse.

September 7, 2006 Lunar Eclipse Parameters
Parameter	Value
Penumbral Magnitude	1.13488
Umbral Magnitude	0.18568
Gamma	−0.92619
Sun Right Ascension	11h04m47.1s
Sun Declination	+05°54'23.1"
Sun Semi-Diameter	15'52.4"
Sun Equatorial Horizontal Parallax	08.7"
Moon Right Ascension	23h06m35.6s
Moon Declination	-06°44'25.6"
Moon Semi-Diameter	16'43.3"
Moon Equatorial Horizontal Parallax	1°01'22.3"
ΔT	65.1 s

== Eclipse season ==
This eclipse is part of an eclipse season, a period, roughly every six months, when eclipses occur. Only two (or occasionally three) eclipse seasons occur each year, and each season lasts about 35 days and repeats just short of six months (173 days) later; thus two full eclipse seasons always occur each year. Either two or three eclipses happen each eclipse season. In the sequence below, each eclipse is separated by a fortnight.

Eclipse season of September 2006
September 7 Ascending node (full moon)	September 22 Descending node (new moon)
Partial lunar eclipse Lunar Saros 118	Annular solar eclipse Solar Saros 144

== Related eclipses ==
=== Eclipses in 2006 ===
- A penumbral lunar eclipse on March 14.
- A total solar eclipse on March 29.
- A partial lunar eclipse on September 7.
- An annular solar eclipse on September 22.

=== Metonic ===
- Preceded by: Lunar eclipse of November 20, 2002
- Followed by: Lunar eclipse of June 26, 2010

=== Tzolkinex ===
- Preceded by: Lunar eclipse of July 28, 1999
- Followed by: Lunar eclipse of October 18, 2013

=== Half-Saros ===
- Preceded by: Solar eclipse of September 2, 1997
- Followed by: Solar eclipse of September 13, 2015

=== Tritos ===
- Preceded by: Lunar eclipse of October 8, 1995
- Followed by: Lunar eclipse of August 7, 2017

=== Lunar Saros 118 ===
- Preceded by: Lunar eclipse of August 27, 1988
- Followed by: Lunar eclipse of September 18, 2024

=== Inex ===
- Preceded by: Lunar eclipse of September 27, 1977
- Followed by: Lunar eclipse of August 19, 2035

=== Triad ===
- Preceded by: Lunar eclipse of November 7, 1919
- Followed by: Lunar eclipse of July 8, 2093

=== Lunar eclipses of 2006–2009 ===
This eclipse is a member of a semester series. An eclipse in a semester series of lunar eclipses repeats approximately every 177 days and 4 hours (a semester) at alternating nodes of the Moon's orbit.

The lunar eclipses on July 7, 2009 (penumbral) and December 31, 2009 (partial) occur in the next lunar year eclipse set.

Lunar eclipse series sets from 2006 to 2009
Descending node				Ascending node			
Saros	Date Viewing	Type Chart	Gamma	Saros	Date Viewing	Type Chart	Gamma
113	2006 Mar 14	Penumbral	1.0211	118	2006 Sep 7	Partial	−0.9262
123	2007 Mar 03	Total	0.3175	128	2007 Aug 28	Total	−0.2146
133	2008 Feb 21	Total	−0.3992	138	2008 Aug 16	Partial	0.5646
143	2009 Feb 09	Penumbral	−1.0640	148	2009 Aug 06	Penumbral	1.3572

=== Metonic series ===
The Metonic cycle repeats nearly exactly every 19 years and represents a Saros cycle plus one lunar year. Because it occurs on the same calendar date, the Earth's shadow will in nearly the same location relative to the background stars.

1. 2006 Mar 14.99 - penumbral (113); 2. 2025 Mar 14.29 - total (123); 3. 2044 Mar 13.82 - total (133); 4. 2063 Mar 14.67- partial (143)	1. 2006 Sep 07.79 - partial (118); 2. 2025 Sep 07.76 - total (128); 3. 2044 Sep 07.47 - partial (138); 4. 2063 Sep 07.86 - penumbral (148)

=== Saros 118 ===
This eclipse is a part of Saros series 118, repeating every 18 years, 11 days, and containing 73 events. The series started with a penumbral lunar eclipse on March 2, 1105. It contains partial eclipses from June 8, 1267 through August 12, 1375; total eclipses from August 22, 1393 through June 22, 1880; and a second set of partial eclipses from July 3, 1898 through September 18, 2024. The series ends at member 73 as a penumbral eclipse on May 7, 2403.

The longest duration of totality was produced by member 37 at 99 minutes, 22 seconds on April 7, 1754. All eclipses in this series occur at the Moon’s ascending node of orbit.

Greatest	First			
The greatest eclipse of the series occurred on 1754 Apr 07, lasting 99 minutes, 22 seconds.	Penumbral	Partial	Total	Central
The greatest eclipse of the series occurred on 1754 Apr 07, lasting 99 minutes, 22 seconds.	1105 Mar 02	1267 Jun 08	1393 Aug 22	1465 Oct 04
The greatest eclipse of the series occurred on 1754 Apr 07, lasting 99 minutes, 22 seconds.	Last			
The greatest eclipse of the series occurred on 1754 Apr 07, lasting 99 minutes, 22 seconds.	Central	Total	Partial	Penumbral
The greatest eclipse of the series occurred on 1754 Apr 07, lasting 99 minutes, 22 seconds.	1826 May 21	1880 Jun 22	2024 Sep 18	2403 May 07

Eclipses are tabulated in three columns; every third eclipse in the same column is one exeligmos apart, so they all cast shadows over approximately the same parts of the Earth.

Series members 40–61 occur between 1801 and 2200:
40	41	42
1808 May 10	1826 May 21	1844 May 31
43	44	45
1862 Jun 12	1880 Jun 22	1898 Jul 03
46	47	48
1916 Jul 15	1934 Jul 26	1952 Aug 05
49	50	51
1970 Aug 17	1988 Aug 27	2006 Sep 07
52	53	54
2024 Sep 18	2042 Sep 29	2060 Oct 09
55	56	57
2078 Oct 21	2096 Oct 31	2114 Nov 12
58	59	60
2132 Nov 23	2150 Dec 04	2168 Dec 14
61
2186 Dec 26

=== Tritos series ===
This eclipse is a part of a tritos cycle, repeating at alternating nodes every 135 synodic months (≈ 3986.63 days, or 11 years minus 1 month). Their appearance and longitude are irregular due to a lack of synchronization with the anomalistic month (period of perigee), but groupings of 3 tritos cycles (≈ 33 years minus 3 months) come close (≈ 434.044 anomalistic months), so eclipses are similar in these groupings.

Series members between 1801 and 2200
1810 Mar 21 (Saros 100)	1821 Feb 17 (Saros 101)	1832 Jan 17 (Saros 102)	1842 Dec 17 (Saros 103)	
1864 Oct 15 (Saros 105)	1875 Sep 15 (Saros 106)	1886 Aug 14 (Saros 107)	1897 Jul 14 (Saros 108)	1908 Jun 14 (Saros 109)
1919 May 15 (Saros 110)	1930 Apr 13 (Saros 111)	1941 Mar 13 (Saros 112)	1952 Feb 11 (Saros 113)	1963 Jan 09 (Saros 114)
1973 Dec 10 (Saros 115)	1984 Nov 08 (Saros 116)	1995 Oct 08 (Saros 117)	2006 Sep 07 (Saros 118)	2017 Aug 07 (Saros 119)
2028 Jul 06 (Saros 120)	2039 Jun 06 (Saros 121)	2050 May 06 (Saros 122)	2061 Apr 04 (Saros 123)	2072 Mar 04 (Saros 124)
2083 Feb 02 (Saros 125)	2094 Jan 01 (Saros 126)	2104 Dec 02 (Saros 127)	2115 Nov 02 (Saros 128)	2126 Oct 01 (Saros 129)
2137 Aug 30 (Saros 130)	2148 Jul 31 (Saros 131)	2159 Jun 30 (Saros 132)	2170 May 30 (Saros 133)	2181 Apr 29 (Saros 134)
2192 Mar 28 (Saros 135)

=== Inex series ===
This eclipse is a part of the long period inex cycle, repeating at alternating nodes, every 358 synodic months (≈ 10,571.95 days, or 29 years minus 20 days). Their appearance and longitude are irregular due to a lack of synchronization with the anomalistic month (period of perigee). However, groupings of 3 inex cycles (≈ 87 years minus 2 months) comes close (≈ 1,151.02 anomalistic months), so eclipses are similar in these groupings.

Series members between 1801 and 2200
1804 Jan 26 (Saros 111)	1833 Jan 06 (Saros 112)	1861 Dec 17 (Saros 113)
1890 Nov 26 (Saros 114)	1919 Nov 07 (Saros 115)	1948 Oct 18 (Saros 116)
1977 Sep 27 (Saros 117)	2006 Sep 07 (Saros 118)	2035 Aug 19 (Saros 119)
2064 Jul 28 (Saros 120)	2093 Jul 08 (Saros 121)	2122 Jun 20 (Saros 122)
2151 May 30 (Saros 123)	2180 May 09 (Saros 124)	

=== Half-Saros cycle ===
A lunar eclipse will be preceded and followed by solar eclipses by 9 years and 5.5 days (a half saros). This lunar eclipse is related to two partial solar eclipses of Solar Saros 125.

September 2, 1997	September 13, 2015

== See also ==
- List of lunar eclipses and List of 21st-century lunar eclipses
- May 2003 lunar eclipse
- November 2003 lunar eclipse
- May 2004 lunar eclipse
- File:2006-09-07 Lunar Eclipse Sketch.gif Chart
