= Lunar Saros 117 =

Repeating cycle of lunar eclipses

Member 52
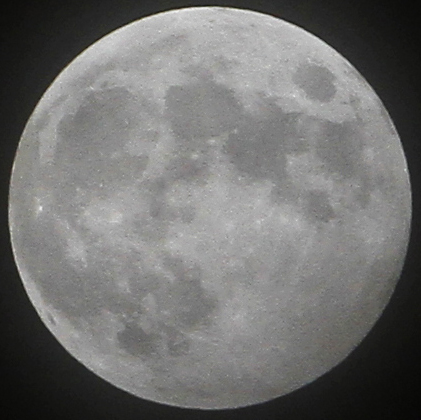
2013 Oct 18

Saros cycle series 117 for lunar eclipses occurs at the moon's descending node, repeats every 18 years 11 and 1/3 days. It contains 71 events.

Cat.	Saros	Mem	Date	Time UT (hr:mn)	Type	Gamma	Magnitude	Duration (min)			Contacts UT (hr:mn)						Chart
Cat.	Saros	Mem	Date	Greatest	Type	Gamma	Magnitude	Pen.	Par.	Tot.	P1	P4	U1	U2	U3	U4	Chart
07449	117	1	1094 Apr 03	17:48:02	Penumbral	-1.5448	-0.9944	60.1			17:17:59	18:18:05					
07495	117	2	1112 Apr 14	1:00:10	Penumbral	-1.49	-0.8941	110.7			0:04:49	1:55:31					
07541	117	3	1130 Apr 25	8:04:26	Penumbral	-1.4296	-0.7835	146.8			6:51:02	9:17:50					
07587	117	4	1148 May 5	14:59:11	Penumbral	-1.362	-0.6601	177.8			13:30:17	16:28:05					
07635	117	5	1166 May 16	21:48:48	Penumbral	-1.2909	-0.5302	204.5			20:06:33	23:31:03					
07681	117	6	1184 May 27	4:31:35	Penumbral	-1.2148	-0.3916	228.7			2:37:14	6:25:56					
07727	117	7	1202 Jun 07	11:11:59	Penumbral	-1.1369	-0.2497	250.1			9:06:56	13:17:02					
07773	117	8	1220 Jun 17	17:47:16	Penumbral	-1.0553	-0.1015	269.5			15:32:31	20:02:01					
07819	117	9	1238 Jun 29	0:23:45	Partial	-0.9751	0.0442	286.4	50.7		22:00:33	2:46:57	23:58:24			0:49:06	
07864	117	10	1256 Jul 09	6:59:02	Partial	-0.8945	0.1902	301.5	103.3		4:28:17	9:29:47	6:07:23			7:50:41	
07908	117	11	1274 Jul 20	13:37:14	Partial	-0.8167	0.3311	314.5	133.8		10:59:59	16:14:29	12:30:20			14:44:08	
07953	117	12	1292 Jul 30	20:17:43	Partial	-0.7409	0.4680	325.8	156.1		17:34:49	23:00:37	18:59:40			21:35:46	
07998	117	13	1310 Aug 11	3:04:21	Partial	-0.6706	0.5948	335.3	172.8		0:16:42	5:52:00	1:37:57			4:30:45	
08041	117	14	1328 Aug 21	9:56:15	Partial	-0.6050	0.7127	343.3	185.8		7:04:36	12:47:54	8:23:21			11:29:09	
08082	117	15	1346 Sep 01	16:54:27	Partial	-0.5451	0.8204	350.0	195.9		13:59:27	19:49:27	15:16:30			18:32:24	
08124	117	16	1364 Sep 12	0:00:44	Partial	-0.4920	0.9153	355.4	203.7		21:03:02	2:58:26	22:18:53			1:42:35	
08165	117	17	1382 Sep 23	7:15:12	Partial	-0.4458	0.9977	359.9	209.6		4:15:15	10:15:09	5:30:24			9:00:00	
08206	117	18	1400 Oct 03	14:38:36	Total	-0.4071	1.0665	363.4	214.1	41.7	11:36:54	17:40:18	12:51:33	14:17:45	14:59:27	16:25:39	
08248	117	19	1418 Oct 14	22:09:21	Total	-0.3746	1.1241	366.2	217.5	56.0	19:06:15	1:12:27	20:20:36	21:41:21	22:37:21	23:58:06	
08290	117	20	1436 Oct 25	5:49:24	Total	-0.3498	1.1678	368.4	219.8	64.1	2:45:12	8:53:36	3:59:30	5:17:21	6:21:27	7:39:18	
08331	117	21	1454 Nov 05	13:35:42	Total	-0.3300	1.2025	370.0	221.6	69.6	10:30:42	16:40:42	11:44:54	13:00:54	14:10:30	15:26:30	
08372	117	22	1472 Nov 15	21:28:20	Total	-0.3154	1.2280	371.2	222.8	73.2	18:22:44	0:33:56	19:36:56	20:51:44	22:04:56	23:19:44	
08411	117	23	1490 Nov 27	5:25:13	Total	-0.3042	1.2476	372.1	223.7	75.7	2:19:10	8:31:16	3:33:22	4:47:22	6:03:04	7:17:04	
08451	117	24	1508 Dec 07	13:26:13	Total	-0.2962	1.2618	372.7	224.3	77.4	10:19:52	16:32:34	11:34:04	12:47:31	14:04:55	15:18:22	
08492	117	25	1526 Dec 18	21:27:49	Total	-0.2887	1.2754	373.1	224.9	79.0	18:21:16	0:34:22	19:35:22	20:48:19	22:07:19	23:20:16	
08533	117	26	1544 Dec 29	5:29:10	Total	-0.2809	1.2900	373.4	225.5	80.7	2:22:28	8:35:52	3:36:25	4:48:49	6:09:31	7:21:55	
08576	117	27	1563 Jan 09	13:28:27	Total	-0.2712	1.3084	373.5	226.2	82.6	10:21:42	16:35:12	11:35:21	12:47:09	14:09:45	15:21:33	
08619	117	28	1581 Jan 19	21:24:57	Total	-0.2589	1.3320	373.6	227.0	84.9	18:18:09	0:31:45	19:31:27	20:42:30	22:07:24	23:18:27	
08663	117	29	1599 Feb 10	5:14:35	Total	-0.2410	1.3663	373.8	228.1	88.0	2:07:41	8:21:29	3:20:32	4:30:35	5:58:35	7:08:38	
08708	117	30	1617 Feb 20	12:58:54	Total	-0.2185	1.4091	373.9	229.3	91.4	9:51:57	16:05:51	11:04:15	12:13:12	13:44:36	14:53:33	
08752	117	31	1635 Mar 03	20:34:50	Total	-0.1889	1.4653	374.1	230.7	95.3	17:27:47	23:41:53	18:39:29	19:47:11	21:22:29	22:30:11	
08796	117	32	1653 Mar 14	4:04:31	Total	-0.1537	1.5320	374.1	232.1	98.9	0:57:28	7:11:34	2:08:28	3:15:04	4:53:58	6:00:34	
08841	117	33	1671 Mar 25	11:23:35	Total	-0.1095	1.6154	374.0	233.4	102.3	8:16:35	14:30:35	9:26:53	10:32:26	12:14:44	13:20:17	
08887	117	34	1689 Apr 04	18:36:37	Total	-0.0599	1.7089	373.6	234.2	104.7	15:29:49	21:43:25	16:39:31	17:44:16	19:28:58	20:33:43	
08933	117	35	1707 Apr 17	1:39:36	Total	-0.0018	1.8178	372.7	234.4	105.7	22:33:15	4:45:57	23:42:24	0:46:45	2:32:27	3:36:48	
08980	117	36	1725 Apr 27	8:37:09	Total	0.0615	1.7107	371.3	233.7	104.8	5:31:30	11:42:48	6:40:18	7:44:45	9:29:33	10:34:00	
09026	117	37	1743 May 8	15:26:08	Total	0.1323	1.5829	369.0	231.8	101.1	12:21:38	18:30:38	13:30:14	14:35:35	16:16:41	17:22:02	
09073	117	38	1761 May 18	22:11:58	Total	0.2063	1.4493	365.9	228.5	94.1	19:09:01	1:14:55	20:17:43	21:24:55	22:59:01	0:06:13	
09119	117	39	1779 May 30	4:52:10	Total	0.2853	1.3064	361.7	223.4	82.1	1:51:19	7:53:01	3:00:28	4:11:07	5:33:13	6:43:52	
09164	117	40	1797 Jun 09	11:30:23	Total	0.3666	1.1592	356.4	216.5	62.2	8:32:11	14:28:35	9:42:08	10:59:17	12:01:29	13:18:38	
09209	117	41	1815 Jun 21	18:06:32	Total	0.4498	1.0081	349.9	207.4	14.7	15:11:35	21:01:29	16:22:50	17:59:11	18:13:53	19:50:14	
09255	117	42	1833 Jul 02	0:43:22	Partial	0.5329	0.8572	342.3	196.1		21:52:13	3:34:31	23:05:19			2:21:25	
09302	117	43	1851 Jul 13	7:21:41	Partial	0.6154	0.7069	333.6	182.3		4:34:53	10:08:29	5:50:32			8:52:50	
09346	117	44	1869 Jul 23	14:02:45	Partial	0.6961	0.5599	323.8	165.8		11:20:51	16:44:39	12:39:51			15:25:39	
09389	117	45	1887 Aug 03	20:48:53	Partial	0.7732	0.4194	313.3	146.3		18:12:14	23:25:32	19:35:44			22:02:02	
09432	117	46	1905 Aug 15	3:40:59	Partial	0.8456	0.2871	302.3	123.1		1:09:50	6:12:08	2:39:26			4:42:32	
09474	117	47	1923 Aug 26	10:39:52	Partial	0.9133	0.1634	290.8	94.2		8:14:28	13:05:16	9:52:46			11:26:58	
09516	117	48	1941 Sep 05	17:47:15	Partial	0.9746	0.0511	279.3	53.4		15:27:36	20:06:54	17:20:33			18:13:57	
09557	117	49	1959 Sep 17	1:03:37	Penumbral	1.0296	-0.0496	268.0			22:49:37	3:17:37					
09598	117	50	1977 Sep 27	8:30:08	Penumbral	1.0768	-0.1361	257.5			6:21:23	10:38:53					
09639	117	51	1995 Oct 08	16:05:12	Penumbral	1.1179	-0.2115	247.6			14:01:24	18:09:00					
09681	117	52	2013 Oct 18	23:51:25	Penumbral	1.1508	-0.2718	239.1			21:51:52	1:50:58					
09722	117	53	2031 Oct 30	7:46:45	Penumbral	1.1773	-0.3204	231.8			5:50:51	9:42:39					
09762	117	54	2049 Nov 09	15:52:11	Penumbral	1.1964	-0.3553	226.1			13:59:08	17:45:14					
09803	117	55	2067 Nov 21	0:04:42	Penumbral	1.2106	-0.3811	221.5			22:13:57	1:55:27					
09844	117	56	2085 Dec 01	8:25:35	Penumbral	1.2189	-0.3957	218.5			6:36:20	10:14:50					
09886	117	57	2103 Dec 13	16:51:37	Penumbral	1.2239	-0.4042	216.3			15:03:28	18:39:46					
09928	117	58	2121 Dec 24	1:22:13	Penumbral	1.2261	-0.4071	214.8			23:34:49	3:09:37					
09971	117	59	2140 Jan 04	9:55:16	Penumbral	1.2270	-0.4075	213.6			8:08:28	11:42:04					
10015	117	60	2158 Jan 14	18:29:52	Penumbral	1.2275	-0.4068	212.5			16:43:37	20:16:07					
10058	117	61	2176 Jan 26	3:03:39	Penumbral	1.2292	-0.4082	210.9			1:18:12	4:49:06					
10101	117	62	2194 Feb 05	11:34:56	Penumbral	1.2338	-0.4146	208.5			9:50:41	13:19:11					
10144	117	63	2212 Feb 17	20:03:16	Penumbral	1.2415	-0.4264	205.2			18:20:40	21:45:52					
10188	117	64	2230 Feb 28	4:27:10	Penumbral	1.2537	-0.4463	200.5			2:46:55	6:07:25					
10233	117	65	2248 Mar 10	12:44:45	Penumbral	1.2717	-0.4766	193.9			11:07:48	14:21:42					
10279	117	66	2266 Mar 21	20:56:19	Penumbral	1.2951	-0.5167	185.4			19:23:37	22:29:01					
10325	117	67	2284 Apr 01	5:01:09	Penumbral	1.3247	-0.5682	174.2			3:34:03	6:28:15					
10371	117	68	2302 Apr 13	12:59:53	Penumbral	1.3599	-0.6300	160.1			11:39:50	14:19:56					
10417	117	69	2320 Apr 23	20:50:31	Penumbral	1.4021	-0.7048	141.4			19:39:49	22:01:13					
10463	117	70	2338 May 5	4:35:58	Penumbral	1.4491	-0.7884	116.8			3:37:34	5:34:22					
10509	117	71	2356 May 15	12:14:44	Penumbral	1.5017	-0.8824	80.3			11:34:35	12:54:53					

== See also ==
- List of lunar eclipses
  - List of Saros series for lunar eclipses
