= September 1959 lunar eclipse =

Penumbral lunar eclipse September 17, 1959

- Penumbral eclipse
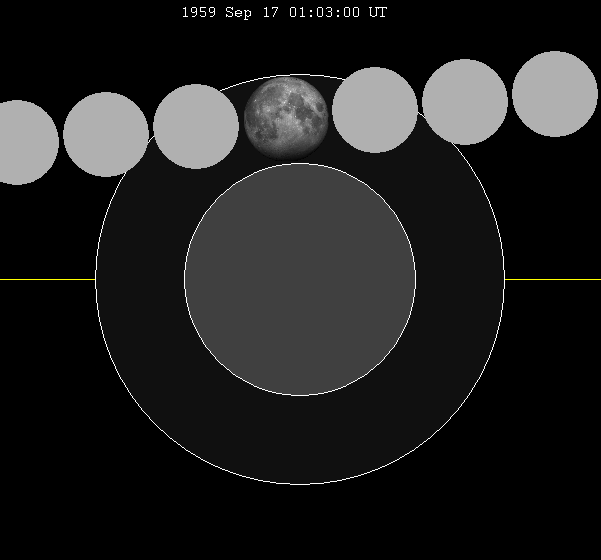
- The Moon's hourly motion shown right to left
- Date: September 17, 1959
- Gamma: 1.0296
- Magnitude: −0.0495
- Saros cycle: 117 (49 of 72)
- Penumbral: 268 minutes, 2 seconds
Contacts (UTC)
- P1: 22:49:01
- Greatest: 1:03:04
- P4: 3:17:03

A penumbral lunar eclipse occurred at the Moon's descending node of orbit on Thursday, September 17, 1959, with an umbral magnitude of −0.0495. A lunar eclipse occurs when the Moon moves into the Earth's shadow, causing the Moon to be darkened. A penumbral lunar eclipse occurs when part or all of the Moon's near side passes into the Earth's penumbra. Unlike a solar eclipse, which can only be viewed from a relatively small area of the world, a lunar eclipse may be viewed from anywhere on the night side of Earth. Occurring about 6.1 days before apogee (on September 23, 1959, at 2:30 UTC), the Moon's apparent diameter was smaller.

== Visibility ==
The eclipse was completely visible over South America, Africa, and Europe, seen rising over North America and the eastern Pacific Ocean and setting over the western half of Asia.

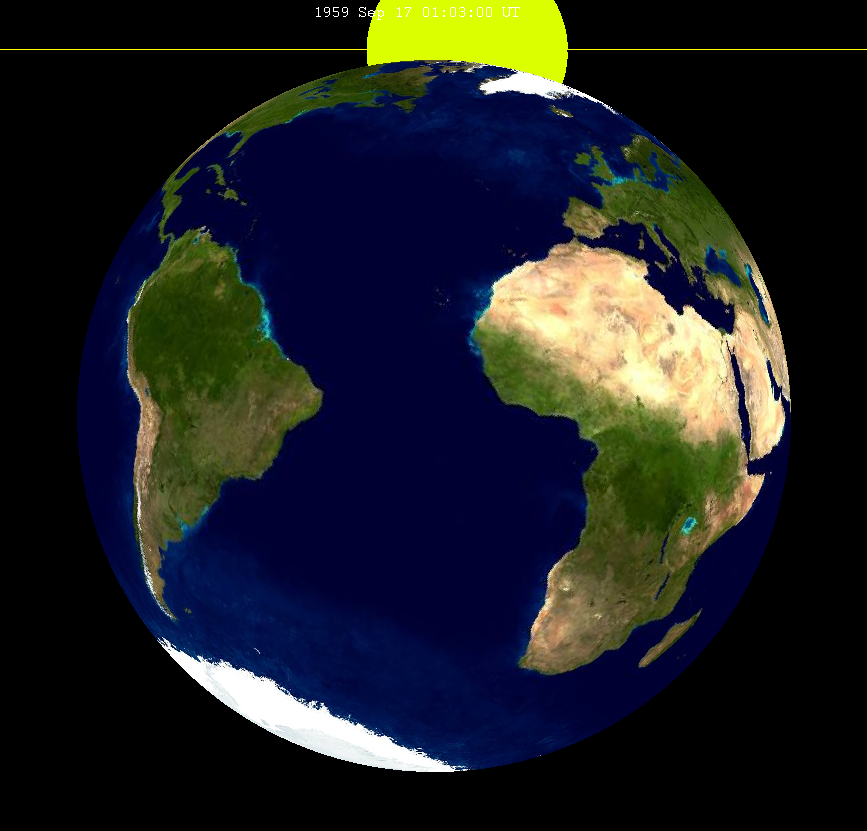
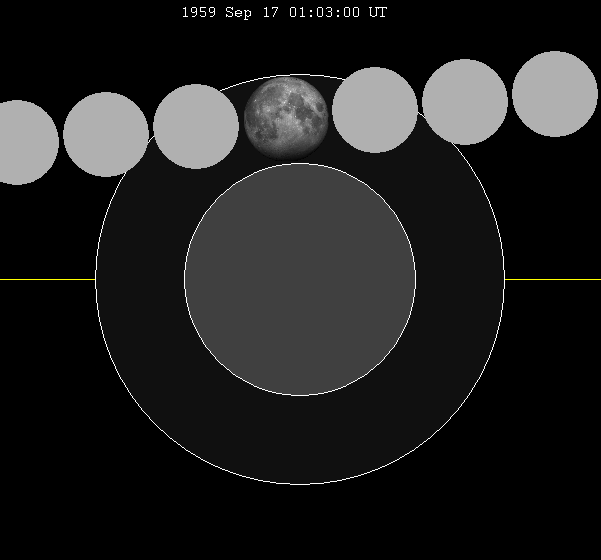

== Eclipse details ==
Shown below is a table displaying details about this particular lunar eclipse. It describes various parameters pertaining to this eclipse.

September 17, 1959 Lunar Eclipse Parameters
Parameter	Value
Penumbral Magnitude	0.98742
Umbral Magnitude	−0.04953
Gamma	1.02963
Sun Right Ascension	11h35m46.2s
Sun Declination	+02°37'11.9"
Sun Semi-Diameter	15'54.7"
Sun Equatorial Horizontal Parallax	08.7"
Moon Right Ascension	23h34m35.7s
Moon Declination	-01°41'57.4"
Moon Semi-Diameter	15'20.7"
Moon Equatorial Horizontal Parallax	0°56'19.0"
ΔT	33.0 s

== Eclipse season ==
This eclipse is part of an eclipse season, a period, roughly every six months, when eclipses occur. Only two (or occasionally three) eclipse seasons occur each year, and each season lasts about 35 days and repeats just short of six months (173 days) later; thus two full eclipse seasons always occur each year. Either two or three eclipses happen each eclipse season. In the sequence below, each eclipse is separated by a fortnight.

Eclipse season of September–October 1959
September 17 Descending node (full moon)	October 2 Ascending node (new moon)
Penumbral lunar eclipse Lunar Saros 117	Total solar eclipse Solar Saros 143

== Related eclipses ==
=== Eclipses in 1959 ===
- A partial lunar eclipse on March 24.
- An annular solar eclipse on April 8.
- A penumbral lunar eclipse on September 17.
- A total solar eclipse on October 2.

=== Metonic ===
- Preceded by: Lunar eclipse of November 29, 1955
- Followed by: Lunar eclipse of July 6, 1963

=== Tzolkinex ===
- Preceded by: Lunar eclipse of August 5, 1952
- Followed by: Lunar eclipse of October 29, 1966

=== Half-Saros ===
- Preceded by: Solar eclipse of September 12, 1950
- Followed by: Solar eclipse of September 22, 1968

=== Tritos ===
- Preceded by: Lunar eclipse of October 18, 1948
- Followed by: Lunar eclipse of August 17, 1970

=== Lunar Saros 117 ===
- Preceded by: Lunar eclipse of September 5, 1941
- Followed by: Lunar eclipse of September 27, 1977

=== Inex ===
- Preceded by: Lunar eclipse of October 7, 1930
- Followed by: Lunar eclipse of August 27, 1988

=== Triad ===
- Preceded by: Lunar eclipse of November 15, 1872
- Followed by: Lunar eclipse of July 18, 2046

=== Lunar eclipses of 1958–1962 ===
This eclipse is a member of a semester series. An eclipse in a semester series of lunar eclipses repeats approximately every 177 days and 4 hours (a semester) at alternating nodes of the Moon's orbit.

The lunar eclipses on May 3, 1958 (partial) and October 28, 1958 (penumbral) occur in the previous lunar year eclipse set, and the penumbral lunar eclipse on July 17, 1962 occurs in the next lunar year eclipse set.

Lunar eclipse series sets from 1958 to 1962
Ascending node				Descending node			
Saros	Date Viewing	Type Chart	Gamma	Saros	Date Viewing	Type Chart	Gamma
102	1958 Apr 04	Penumbral	−1.5381				
112	1959 Mar 24	Partial	−0.8757	117	1959 Sep 17	Penumbral	1.0296
122	1960 Mar 13	Total	−0.1799	127	1960 Sep 05	Total	0.2422
132	1961 Mar 02	Partial	0.5541	137	1961 Aug 26	Partial	−0.4895
142	1962 Feb 19	Penumbral	1.2512	147	1962 Aug 15	Penumbral	−1.2210

=== Saros 117 ===
This eclipse is a part of Saros series 117, repeating every 18 years, 11 days, and containing 71 events. The series started with a penumbral lunar eclipse on April 3, 1094. It contains partial eclipses from June 29, 1238 through September 23, 1382; total eclipses from October 3, 1400 through June 21, 1815; and a second set of partial eclipses from July 2, 1833 through September 5, 1941. The series ends at member 71 as a penumbral eclipse on May 15, 2356.

The longest duration of totality was produced by member 35 at 105 minutes, 43 seconds on April 17, 1707. All eclipses in this series occur at the Moon’s descending node of orbit.

Greatest	First			
The greatest eclipse of the series occurred on 1707 Apr 17, lasting 105 minutes, 43 seconds.	Penumbral	Partial	Total	Central
The greatest eclipse of the series occurred on 1707 Apr 17, lasting 105 minutes, 43 seconds.	1094 Apr 03	1238 Jun 29	1400 Oct 03	1563 Jan 09
The greatest eclipse of the series occurred on 1707 Apr 17, lasting 105 minutes, 43 seconds.	Last			
The greatest eclipse of the series occurred on 1707 Apr 17, lasting 105 minutes, 43 seconds.	Central	Total	Partial	Penumbral
The greatest eclipse of the series occurred on 1707 Apr 17, lasting 105 minutes, 43 seconds.	1761 May 18	1815 Jun 21	1941 Sep 05	2356 May 15

Eclipses are tabulated in three columns; every third eclipse in the same column is one exeligmos apart, so they all cast shadows over approximately the same parts of the Earth.

Series members 41–62 occur between 1801 and 2200:
41	42	43
1815 Jun 21	1833 Jul 02	1851 Jul 13
44	45	46
1869 Jul 23	1887 Aug 03	1905 Aug 15
47	48	49
1923 Aug 26	1941 Sep 05	1959 Sep 17
50	51	52
1977 Sep 27	1995 Oct 08	2013 Oct 18
53	54	55
2031 Oct 30	2049 Nov 09	2067 Nov 21
56	57	58
2085 Dec 01	2103 Dec 13	2121 Dec 24
59	60	61
2140 Jan 04	2158 Jan 14	2176 Jan 26
62
2194 Feb 05

=== Tritos series ===
This eclipse is a part of a tritos cycle, repeating at alternating nodes every 135 synodic months (≈ 3986.63 days, or 11 years minus 1 month). Their appearance and longitude are irregular due to a lack of synchronization with the anomalistic month (period of perigee), but groupings of 3 tritos cycles (≈ 33 years minus 3 months) come close (≈ 434.044 anomalistic months), so eclipses are similar in these groupings.

Series members between 1801 and 2200
1806 Nov 26 (Saros 103)		1828 Sep 23 (Saros 105)	1839 Aug 24 (Saros 106)	1850 Jul 24 (Saros 107)
1861 Jun 22 (Saros 108)	1872 May 22 (Saros 109)	1883 Apr 22 (Saros 110)	1894 Mar 21 (Saros 111)	1905 Feb 19 (Saros 112)
1916 Jan 20 (Saros 113)	1926 Dec 19 (Saros 114)	1937 Nov 18 (Saros 115)	1948 Oct 18 (Saros 116)	1959 Sep 17 (Saros 117)
1970 Aug 17 (Saros 118)	1981 Jul 17 (Saros 119)	1992 Jun 15 (Saros 120)	2003 May 16 (Saros 121)	2014 Apr 15 (Saros 122)
2025 Mar 14 (Saros 123)	2036 Feb 11 (Saros 124)	2047 Jan 12 (Saros 125)	2057 Dec 11 (Saros 126)	2068 Nov 09 (Saros 127)
2079 Oct 10 (Saros 128)	2090 Sep 08 (Saros 129)	2101 Aug 09 (Saros 130)	2112 Jul 09 (Saros 131)	2123 Jun 09 (Saros 132)
2134 May 08 (Saros 133)	2145 Apr 07 (Saros 134)	2156 Mar 07 (Saros 135)	2167 Feb 04 (Saros 136)	2178 Jan 04 (Saros 137)
2188 Dec 04 (Saros 138)	2199 Nov 02 (Saros 139)			

=== Inex series ===
This eclipse is a part of the long period inex cycle, repeating at alternating nodes, every 358 synodic months (≈ 10,571.95 days, or 29 years minus 20 days). Their appearance and longitude are irregular due to a lack of synchronization with the anomalistic month (period of perigee). However, groupings of 3 inex cycles (≈ 87 years minus 2 months) comes close (≈ 1,151.02 anomalistic months), so eclipses are similar in these groupings.

Series members between 1801 and 2200
1814 Dec 26 (Saros 112)	1843 Dec 07 (Saros 113)	1872 Nov 15 (Saros 114)
1901 Oct 27 (Saros 115)	1930 Oct 07 (Saros 116)	1959 Sep 17 (Saros 117)
1988 Aug 27 (Saros 118)	2017 Aug 07 (Saros 119)	2046 Jul 18 (Saros 120)
2075 Jun 28 (Saros 121)	2104 Jun 08 (Saros 122)	2133 May 19 (Saros 123)
2162 Apr 29 (Saros 124)	2191 Apr 09 (Saros 125)	

=== Half-Saros cycle ===
A lunar eclipse will be preceded and followed by solar eclipses by 9 years and 5.5 days (a half saros). This lunar eclipse is related to two total solar eclipses of Solar Saros 124.

September 12, 1950	September 22, 1968

== See also ==
- List of lunar eclipses
- List of 20th-century lunar eclipses
