= October 2013 lunar eclipse =

Penumbral lunar eclipse 18 October 2013

- Penumbral eclipse
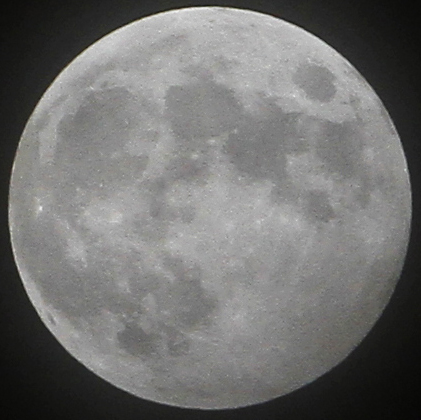
- Penumbral eclipse as viewed from Washington, D.C., 23:53 UTC
- Date: 18 October 2013
- Gamma: 1.1508
- Magnitude: −0.2706
- Saros cycle: 117 (52 of 72)
- Penumbral: 239 minutes, 6 seconds
Contacts (UTC)
- P1: 21:50:41
- Greatest: 23:50:17
- P4: 1:49:47

A penumbral lunar eclipse occurred at the Moon’s descending node of orbit on Friday, 18 October 2013, with an umbral magnitude of −0.2706. A lunar eclipse occurs when the Moon moves into the Earth's shadow, causing the Moon to be darkened. A penumbral lunar eclipse occurs when part or all of the Moon's near side passes into the Earth's penumbra. Unlike a solar eclipse, which can only be viewed from a relatively small area of the world, a lunar eclipse may be viewed from anywhere on the night side of Earth. The Moon's apparent diameter was near the average diameter because it occurred 8.2 days after perigee (on 10 October 2013, at 19:15 UTC) and 6.9 days before apogee (on 25 October 2013, at 10:25 UTC).

== Visibility ==
The eclipse was completely visible over Africa, Europe, eastern South America, and west Asia, seen rising over western South America and North America and setting over south and east Asia.

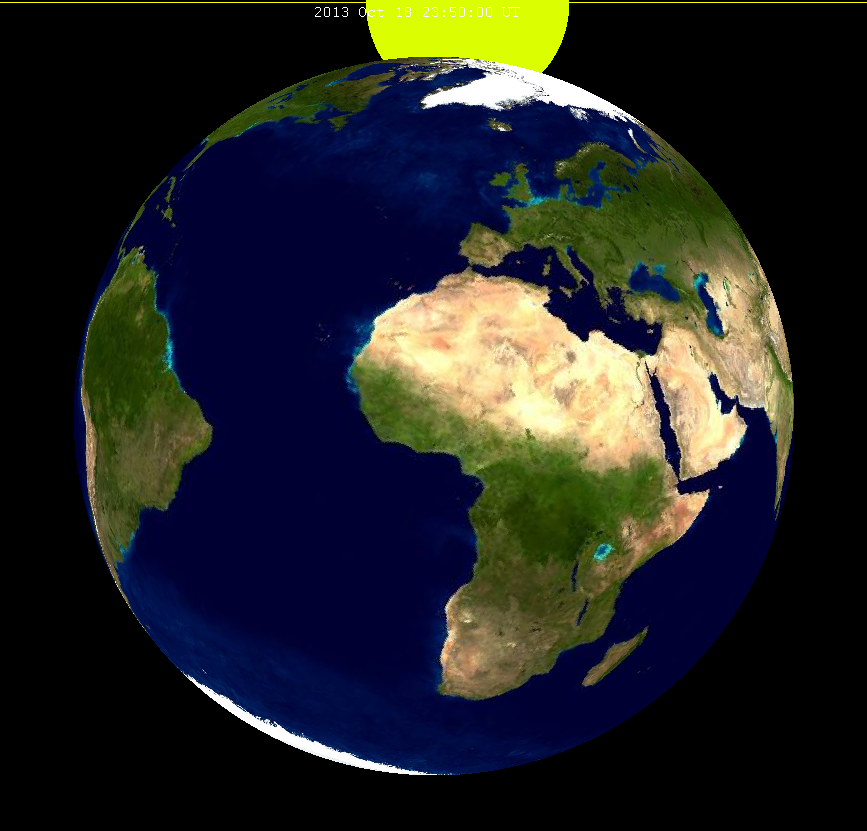
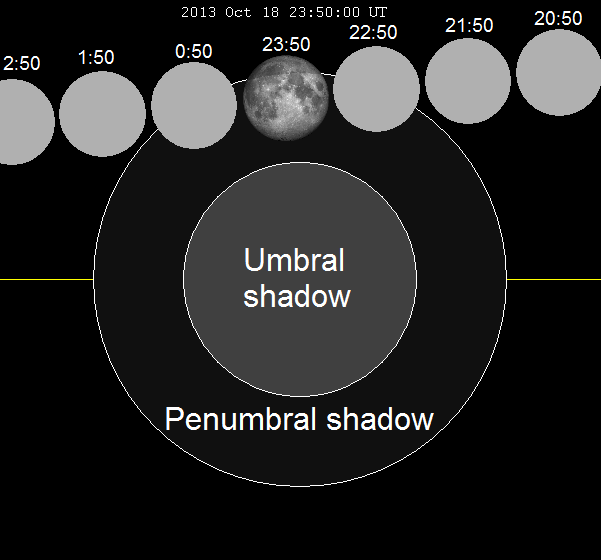
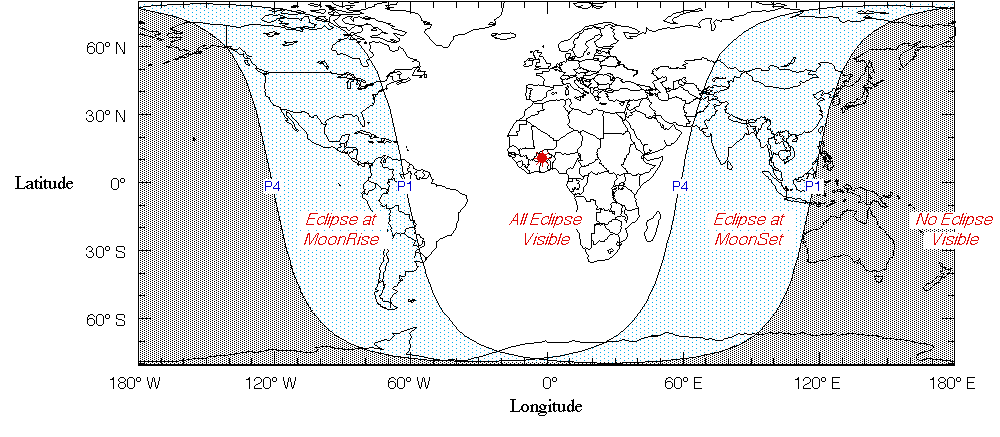
Visibility map

== Images ==
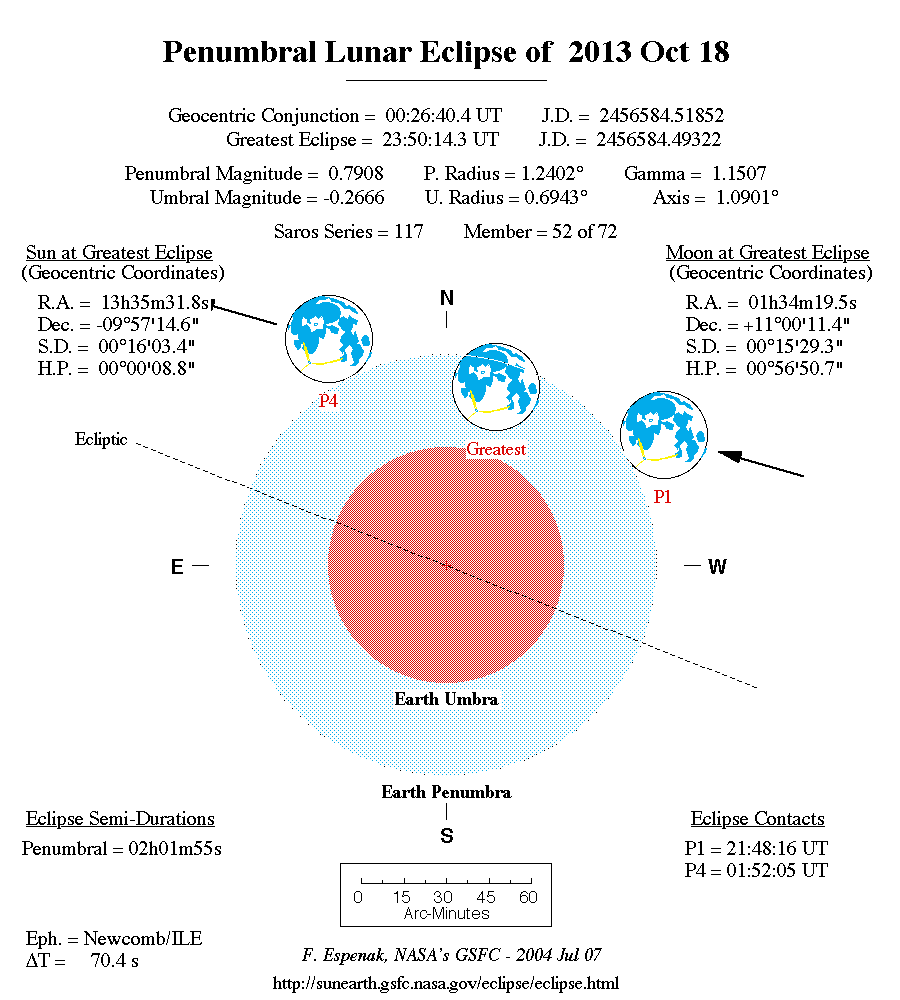
NASA chart of the eclipse

== Gallery ==
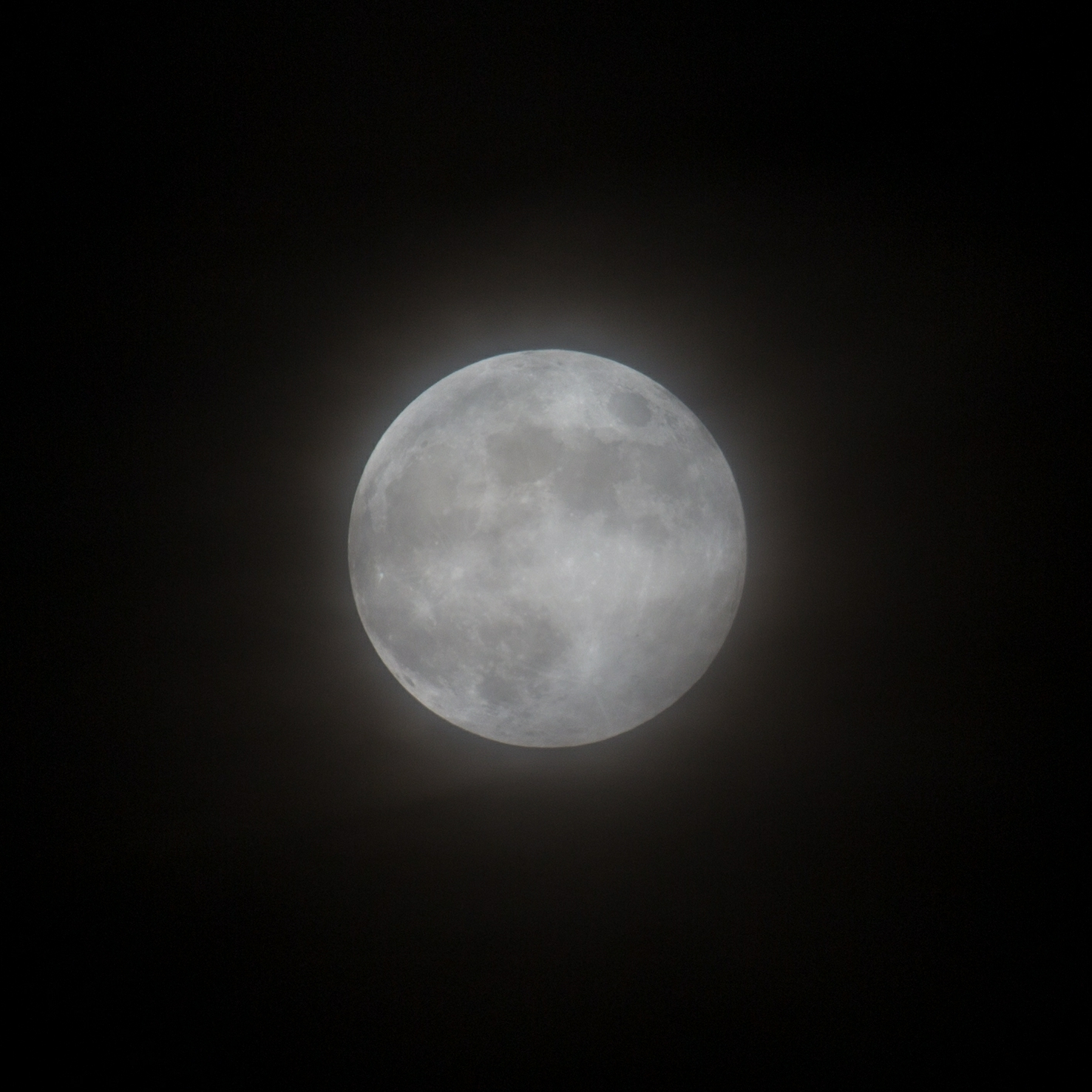
Kennesaw, Georgia, 0:16 UTC

== Eclipse details ==
Shown below is a table displaying details about this particular lunar eclipse. It describes various parameters pertaining to this eclipse.

18 October 2013 Lunar Eclipse Parameters
Parameter	Value
Penumbral Magnitude	0.76603
Umbral Magnitude	−0.27064
Gamma	1.15082
Sun Right Ascension	13h35m31.9s
Sun Declination	-09°57'14.9"
Sun Semi-Diameter	16'03.4"
Sun Equatorial Horizontal Parallax	08.8"
Moon Right Ascension	01h34m19.6s
Moon Declination	+11°00'12.1"
Moon Semi-Diameter	15'29.3"
Moon Equatorial Horizontal Parallax	0°56'50.7"
ΔT	67.2 s

== Eclipse season ==
This eclipse is part of an eclipse season, a period, roughly every six months, when eclipses occur. Only two (or occasionally three) eclipse seasons occur each year, and each season lasts about 35 days and repeats just short of six months (173 days) later; thus two full eclipse seasons always occur each year. Either two or three eclipses happen each eclipse season. In the sequence below, each eclipse is separated by a fortnight.

Eclipse season of October–November 2013
October 18 Descending node (full moon)	November 3 Ascending node (new moon)
Penumbral lunar eclipse Lunar Saros 117	Hybrid solar eclipse Solar Saros 143

== Related eclipses ==
=== Eclipses in 2013 ===
- A partial lunar eclipse on 25 April.
- An annular solar eclipse on 10 May.
- A penumbral lunar eclipse on 25 May.
- A penumbral lunar eclipse on 18 October.
- A hybrid solar eclipse on 3 November.

=== Metonic ===
- Preceded by: Lunar eclipse of 31 December 2009
- Followed by: Lunar eclipse of 7 August 2017

=== Tzolkinex ===
- Preceded by: Lunar eclipse of 7 September 2006
- Followed by: Lunar eclipse of 30 November 2020

=== Half-Saros ===
- Preceded by: Solar eclipse of 14 October 2004
- Followed by: Solar eclipse of 25 October 2022

=== Tritos ===
- Preceded by: Lunar eclipse of 20 November 2002
- Followed by: Lunar eclipse of 18 September 2024

=== Lunar Saros 117 ===
- Preceded by: Lunar eclipse of 8 October 1995
- Followed by: Lunar eclipse of 30 October 2031

=== Inex ===
- Preceded by: Lunar eclipse of 8 November 1984
- Followed by: Lunar eclipse of 29 September 2042

=== Triad ===
- Preceded by: Lunar eclipse of 19 December 1926
- Followed by: Lunar eclipse of 19 August 2100

=== Lunar eclipses of 2013–2016 ===
This eclipse is a member of a semester series. An eclipse in a semester series of lunar eclipses repeats approximately every 177 days and 4 hours (a semester) at alternating nodes of the Moon's orbit.

The penumbral lunar eclipse on May 25, 2013 occurs in the previous lunar year eclipse set, and the penumbral lunar eclipse on August 18, 2016 occurs in the next lunar year eclipse set.

Lunar eclipse series sets from 2013 to 2016
Ascending node				Descending node			
Saros	Date Viewing	Type Chart	Gamma	Saros	Date Viewing	Type Chart	Gamma
112	2013 Apr 25	Partial	−1.0121	117	2013 Oct 18	Penumbral	1.1508
122	2014 Apr 15	Total	−0.3017	127	2014 Oct 08	Total	0.3827
132	2015 Apr 04	Total	0.4460	137	2015 Sep 28	Total	−0.3296
142	2016 Mar 23	Penumbral	1.1592	147	2016 Sep 16	Penumbral	−1.0549

=== Saros 117 ===
This eclipse is a part of Saros series 117, repeating every 18 years, 11 days, and containing 71 events. The series started with a penumbral lunar eclipse on April 3, 1094. It contains partial eclipses from June 29, 1238 through September 23, 1382; total eclipses from October 3, 1400 through June 21, 1815; and a second set of partial eclipses from July 2, 1833 through September 5, 1941. The series ends at member 71 as a penumbral eclipse on May 15, 2356.

The longest duration of totality was produced by member 35 at 105 minutes, 43 seconds on April 17, 1707. All eclipses in this series occur at the Moon’s descending node of orbit.

Greatest	First			
The greatest eclipse of the series occurred on 1707 Apr 17, lasting 105 minutes, 43 seconds.	Penumbral	Partial	Total	Central
The greatest eclipse of the series occurred on 1707 Apr 17, lasting 105 minutes, 43 seconds.	1094 Apr 03	1238 Jun 29	1400 Oct 03	1563 Jan 09
The greatest eclipse of the series occurred on 1707 Apr 17, lasting 105 minutes, 43 seconds.	Last			
The greatest eclipse of the series occurred on 1707 Apr 17, lasting 105 minutes, 43 seconds.	Central	Total	Partial	Penumbral
The greatest eclipse of the series occurred on 1707 Apr 17, lasting 105 minutes, 43 seconds.	1761 May 18	1815 Jun 21	1941 Sep 05	2356 May 15

Eclipses are tabulated in three columns; every third eclipse in the same column is one exeligmos apart, so they all cast shadows over approximately the same parts of the Earth.

Series members 41–62 occur between 1801 and 2200:
41	42	43
1815 Jun 21	1833 Jul 02	1851 Jul 13
44	45	46
1869 Jul 23	1887 Aug 03	1905 Aug 15
47	48	49
1923 Aug 26	1941 Sep 05	1959 Sep 17
50	51	52
1977 Sep 27	1995 Oct 08	2013 Oct 18
53	54	55
2031 Oct 30	2049 Nov 09	2067 Nov 21
56	57	58
2085 Dec 01	2103 Dec 13	2121 Dec 24
59	60	61
2140 Jan 04	2158 Jan 14	2176 Jan 26
62
2194 Feb 05

=== Tritos series ===
This eclipse is a part of a tritos cycle, repeating at alternating nodes every 135 synodic months (≈ 3986.63 days, or 11 years minus 1 month). Their appearance and longitude are irregular due to a lack of synchronization with the anomalistic month (period of perigee), but groupings of 3 tritos cycles (≈ 33 years minus 3 months) come close (≈ 434.044 anomalistic months), so eclipses are similar in these groupings.

Series members between 1817 and 2200
1817 May 01 (Saros 99)	1828 Mar 31 (Saros 100)	1839 Feb 28 (Saros 101)	1850 Jan 28 (Saros 102)	1860 Dec 28 (Saros 103)
		1893 Sep 25 (Saros 106)		1915 Jul 26 (Saros 108)
1926 Jun 25 (Saros 109)	1937 May 25 (Saros 110)	1948 Apr 23 (Saros 111)	1959 Mar 24 (Saros 112)	1970 Feb 21 (Saros 113)
1981 Jan 20 (Saros 114)	1991 Dec 21 (Saros 115)	2002 Nov 20 (Saros 116)	2013 Oct 18 (Saros 117)	2024 Sep 18 (Saros 118)
2035 Aug 19 (Saros 119)	2046 Jul 18 (Saros 120)	2057 Jun 17 (Saros 121)	2068 May 17 (Saros 122)	2079 Apr 16 (Saros 123)
2090 Mar 15 (Saros 124)	2101 Feb 14 (Saros 125)	2112 Jan 14 (Saros 126)	2122 Dec 13 (Saros 127)	2133 Nov 12 (Saros 128)
2144 Oct 11 (Saros 129)	2155 Sep 11 (Saros 130)	2166 Aug 11 (Saros 131)	2177 Jul 11 (Saros 132)	2188 Jun 09 (Saros 133)
2199 May 10 (Saros 134)

=== Inex series ===
This eclipse is a part of the long period inex cycle, repeating at alternating nodes, every 358 synodic months (≈ 10,571.95 days, or 29 years minus 20 days). Their appearance and longitude are irregular due to a lack of synchronization with the anomalistic month (period of perigee). However, groupings of 3 inex cycles (≈ 87 years minus 2 months) comes close (≈ 1,151.02 anomalistic months), so eclipses are similar in these groupings.

Series members between 1801 and 2200
1811 Mar 10 (Saros 110)	1840 Feb 17 (Saros 111)	1869 Jan 28 (Saros 112)
1898 Jan 08 (Saros 113)	1926 Dec 19 (Saros 114)	1955 Nov 29 (Saros 115)
1984 Nov 08 (Saros 116)	2013 Oct 18 (Saros 117)	2042 Sep 29 (Saros 118)
2071 Sep 09 (Saros 119)	2100 Aug 19 (Saros 120)	2129 Jul 31 (Saros 121)
2158 Jul 11 (Saros 122)	2187 Jun 20 (Saros 123)	

=== Half-Saros cycle ===
A lunar eclipse will be preceded and followed by solar eclipses by 9 years and 5.5 days (a half saros). This lunar eclipse is related to two partial solar eclipses of Solar Saros 124.

October 14, 2004	October 25, 2022

== See also ==
- List of lunar eclipses and List of 21st-century lunar eclipses
