= November 2049 lunar eclipse =

Astronomical event

- Penumbral eclipse
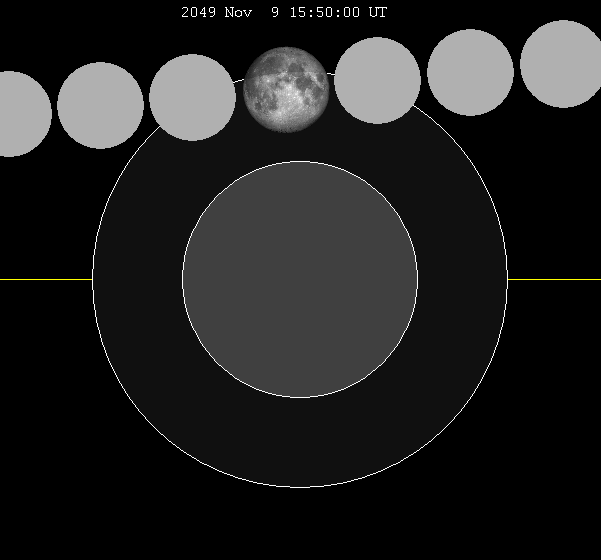
- The Moon's hourly motion shown right to left
- Date: November 9, 2049
- Gamma: 1.1964
- Magnitude: −0.3541
- Saros cycle: 117 (54 of 72)
- Penumbral: 226 minutes, 4 seconds
Contacts (UTC)
- P1: 13:57:32
- Greatest: 15:50:39
- P4: 17:43:36

A penumbral lunar eclipse will occur at the Moon’s descending node of orbit on Tuesday, November 9, 2049, with an umbral magnitude of −0.3541. A lunar eclipse occurs when the Moon moves into the Earth's shadow, causing the Moon to be darkened. A penumbral lunar eclipse occurs when part or all of the Moon's near side passes into the Earth's penumbra. Unlike a solar eclipse, which can only be viewed from a relatively small area of the world, a lunar eclipse may be viewed from anywhere on the night side of Earth. The Moon's apparent diameter will be near the average diameter because it will occur 7.1 days after perigee (on November 2, 2049, at 14:20 UTC) and 6.8 days before apogee (on November 16, 2049, at 10:10 UTC).

== Visibility ==
The eclipse will be completely visible over Asia and Australia, seen rising over much of Africa and Europe and setting over the central Pacific Ocean and northwestern North America.

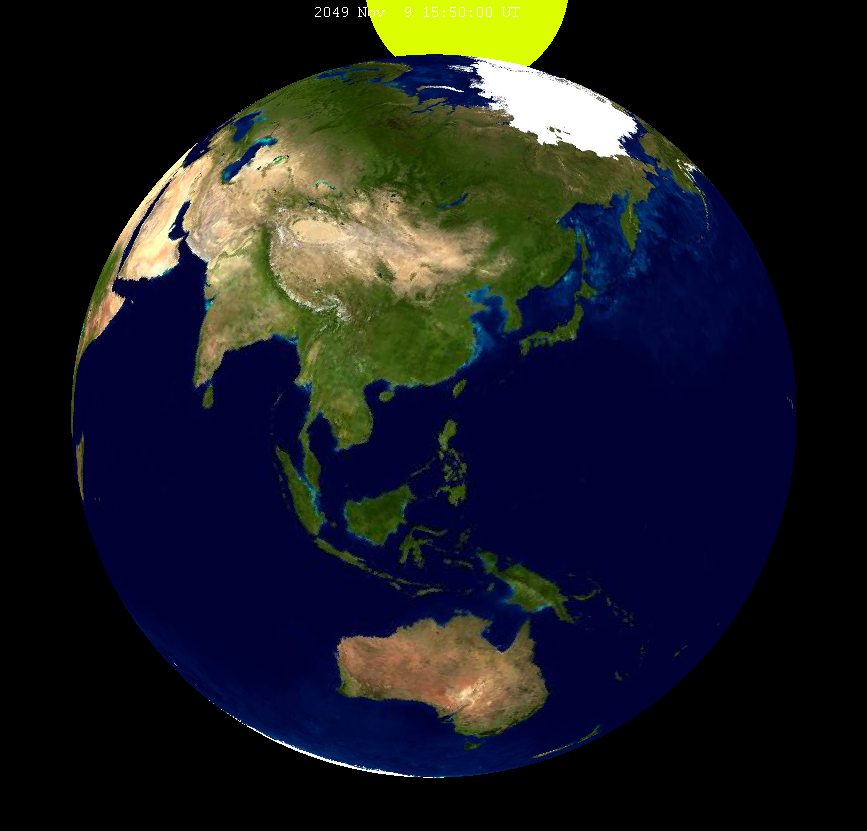
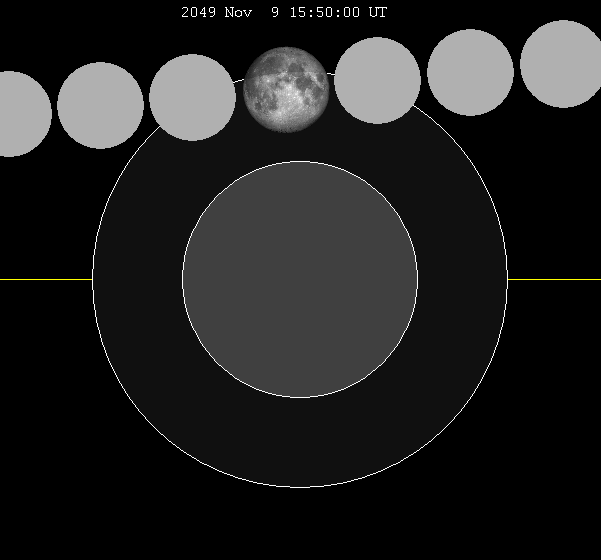

== Eclipse details ==
Shown below is a table displaying details about this particular solar eclipse. It describes various parameters pertaining to this eclipse.

November 9, 2049 Lunar Eclipse Parameters
| Parameter | Value |
|---|---|
| Penumbral Magnitude | 0.68206 |
| Umbral Magnitude | −0.35405 |
| Gamma | 1.19649 |
| Sun Right Ascension | 15h00m53.5s |
| Sun Declination | -17°06'00.6" |
| Sun Semi-Diameter | 16'08.8" |
| Sun Equatorial Horizontal Parallax | 08.9" |
| Moon Right Ascension | 03h00m00.0s |
| Moon Declination | +18°13'14.6" |
| Moon Semi-Diameter | 15'35.1" |
| Moon Equatorial Horizontal Parallax | 0°57'11.8" |
| ΔT | 85.0 s |

== Eclipse season ==
This eclipse is part of an eclipse season, a period, roughly every six months, when eclipses occur. Only two (or occasionally three) eclipse seasons occur each year, and each season lasts about 35 days and repeats just short of six months (173 days) later; thus two full eclipse seasons always occur each year. Either two or three eclipses happen each eclipse season. In the sequence below, each eclipse is separated by a fortnight.

Eclipse season of November 2049
| November 9 Descending node (full moon) | November 25 Ascending node (new moon) |
|---|---|
| Penumbral lunar eclipse Lunar Saros 117 | Hybrid solar eclipse Solar Saros 143 |

== Related eclipses ==
=== Eclipses in 2049 ===
- A penumbral lunar eclipse on May 17.
- An annular solar eclipse on May 31.
- A penumbral lunar eclipse on June 15.
- A penumbral lunar eclipse on November 9.
- A hybrid solar eclipse on November 25.

=== Metonic ===
- Preceded by: Lunar eclipse of January 22, 2046
- Followed by: Lunar eclipse of August 29, 2053

=== Tzolkinex ===
- Preceded by: Lunar eclipse of September 29, 2042
- Followed by: Lunar eclipse of December 22, 2056

=== Half-Saros ===
- Preceded by: Solar eclipse of November 4, 2040
- Followed by: Solar eclipse of November 16, 2058

=== Tritos ===
- Preceded by: Lunar eclipse of December 11, 2038
- Followed by: Lunar eclipse of October 9, 2060

=== Lunar Saros 117 ===
- Preceded by: Lunar eclipse of October 30, 2031
- Followed by: Lunar eclipse of November 21, 2067

=== Inex ===
- Preceded by: Lunar eclipse of November 30, 2020
- Followed by: Lunar eclipse of October 21, 2078

=== Triad ===
- Preceded by: Lunar eclipse of January 9, 1963
- Followed by: Lunar eclipse of September 10, 2136

=== Lunar eclipses of 2049–2052 ===
This eclipse is a member of a semester series. An eclipse in a semester series of lunar eclipses repeats approximately every 177 days and 4 hours (a semester) at alternating nodes of the Moon's orbit.

The penumbral lunar eclipse on June 15, 2049 occurs in the previous lunar year eclipse set.

Lunar eclipse series sets from 2049 to 2052
| Ascending node | | | | Descending node | | | |
| Saros | Date Viewing | Type Chart | Gamma | Saros | Date Viewing | Type Chart | Gamma |
| 112 | 2049 May 17 | Penumbral | −1.1337 | 117 | 2049 Nov 09 | Penumbral | 1.1964 |
| 122 | 2050 May 06 | Total | −0.4181 | 127 | 2050 Oct 30 | Total | 0.4435 |
| 132 | 2051 Apr 26 | Total | 0.3371 | 137 | 2051 Oct 19 | Total | −0.2542 |
| 142 | 2052 Apr 14 | Penumbral | 1.0628 | 147 | 2052 Oct 08 | Partial | −0.9726 |

=== Saros 117 ===
This eclipse is a part of Saros series 117, repeating every 18 years, 11 days, and containing 71 events. The series started with a penumbral lunar eclipse on April 3, 1094. It contains partial eclipses from June 29, 1238 through September 23, 1382; total eclipses from October 3, 1400 through June 21, 1815; and a second set of partial eclipses from July 2, 1833 through September 5, 1941. The series ends at member 71 as a penumbral eclipse on May 15, 2356.

The longest duration of totality was produced by member 35 at 105 minutes, 43 seconds on April 17, 1707. All eclipses in this series occur at the Moon’s descending node of orbit.

| Greatest | First | | | |
|---|---|---|---|---|
| The greatest eclipse of the series occurred on 1707 Apr 17, lasting 105 minutes, 43 seconds. | Penumbral | Partial | Total | Central |
| The greatest eclipse of the series occurred on 1707 Apr 17, lasting 105 minutes, 43 seconds. | 1094 Apr 03 | 1238 Jun 29 | 1400 Oct 03 | 1563 Jan 09 |
| The greatest eclipse of the series occurred on 1707 Apr 17, lasting 105 minutes, 43 seconds. | Last | | | |
| The greatest eclipse of the series occurred on 1707 Apr 17, lasting 105 minutes, 43 seconds. | Central | Total | Partial | Penumbral |
| The greatest eclipse of the series occurred on 1707 Apr 17, lasting 105 minutes, 43 seconds. | 1761 May 18 | 1815 Jun 21 | 1941 Sep 05 | 2356 May 15 |

Eclipses are tabulated in three columns; every third eclipse in the same column is one exeligmos apart, so they all cast shadows over approximately the same parts of the Earth.

Series members 41–62 occur between 1801 and 2200:
| 41 | 42 | 43 |
|---|---|---|
| 1815 Jun 21 | 1833 Jul 02 | 1851 Jul 13 |
| 44 | 45 | 46 |
| 1869 Jul 23 | 1887 Aug 03 | 1905 Aug 15 |
| 47 | 48 | 49 |
| 1923 Aug 26 | 1941 Sep 05 | 1959 Sep 17 |
| 50 | 51 | 52 |
| 1977 Sep 27 | 1995 Oct 08 | 2013 Oct 18 |
| 53 | 54 | 55 |
| 2031 Oct 30 | 2049 Nov 09 | 2067 Nov 21 |
| 56 | 57 | 58 |
| 2085 Dec 01 | 2103 Dec 13 | 2121 Dec 24 |
| 59 | 60 | 61 |
| 2140 Jan 04 | 2158 Jan 14 | 2176 Jan 26 |
62
2194 Feb 05

=== Tritos series ===
This eclipse is a part of a tritos cycle, repeating at alternating nodes every 135 synodic months (≈ 3986.63 days, or 11 years minus 1 month). Their appearance and longitude are irregular due to a lack of synchronization with the anomalistic month (period of perigee), but groupings of 3 tritos cycles (≈ 33 years minus 3 months) come close (≈ 434.044 anomalistic months), so eclipses are similar in these groupings.

Series members between 1886 and 2200
| 1886 Feb 18 (Saros 102) | 1897 Jan 18 (Saros 103) | | | |
| | 1951 Aug 17 (Saros 108) | 1962 Jul 17 (Saros 109) | 1973 Jun 15 (Saros 110) | 1984 May 15 (Saros 111) |
| 1995 Apr 15 (Saros 112) | 2006 Mar 14 (Saros 113) | 2017 Feb 11 (Saros 114) | 2028 Jan 12 (Saros 115) | 2038 Dec 11 (Saros 116) |
| 2049 Nov 09 (Saros 117) | 2060 Oct 09 (Saros 118) | 2071 Sep 09 (Saros 119) | 2082 Aug 08 (Saros 120) | 2093 Jul 08 (Saros 121) |
| 2104 Jun 08 (Saros 122) | 2115 May 08 (Saros 123) | 2126 Apr 07 (Saros 124) | 2137 Mar 07 (Saros 125) | 2148 Feb 04 (Saros 126) |
| 2159 Jan 04 (Saros 127) | 2169 Dec 04 (Saros 128) | 2180 Nov 02 (Saros 129) | 2191 Oct 02 (Saros 130) | |

=== Inex series ===
This eclipse is a part of the long period inex cycle, repeating at alternating nodes, every 358 synodic months (≈ 10,571.95 days, or 29 years minus 20 days). Their appearance and longitude are irregular due to a lack of synchronization with the anomalistic month (period of perigee). However, groupings of 3 inex cycles (≈ 87 years minus 2 months) comes close (≈ 1,151.02 anomalistic months), so eclipses are similar in these groupings.

Series members between 1801 and 2200
| 1818 Apr 21 (Saros 109) | 1847 Mar 31 (Saros 110) | 1876 Mar 10 (Saros 111) |
| 1905 Feb 19 (Saros 112) | 1934 Jan 30 (Saros 113) | 1963 Jan 09 (Saros 114) |
| 1991 Dec 21 (Saros 115) | 2020 Nov 30 (Saros 116) | 2049 Nov 09 (Saros 117) |
| 2078 Oct 21 (Saros 118) | 2107 Oct 02 (Saros 119) | 2136 Sep 10 (Saros 120) |
| 2165 Aug 21 (Saros 121) | 2194 Aug 02 (Saros 122) | |

=== Half-Saros cycle ===
A lunar eclipse will be preceded and followed by solar eclipses by 9 years and 5.5 days (a half saros). This lunar eclipse is related to two partial solar eclipses of Solar Saros 124.

| November 4, 2040 | November 16, 2058 |

== See also ==
- List of lunar eclipses and List of 21st-century lunar eclipses
