= September 1941 lunar eclipse =

Partial lunar eclipse September 5, 1941

- Partial eclipse
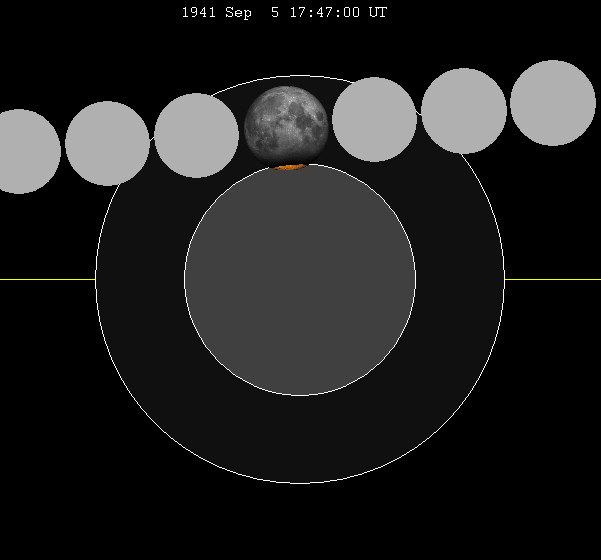
- The Moon's hourly motion shown right to left
- Date: September 5, 1941
- Gamma: 0.9747
- Magnitude: 0.0511
- Saros cycle: 117 (48 of 72)
- Partiality: 53 minutes, 21 seconds
- Penumbral: 279 minutes, 17 seconds
Contacts (UTC)
- P1: 15:27:10
- U1: 17:20:03
- Greatest: 17:46:50
- U4: 18:13:24
- P4: 20:06:27

A partial lunar eclipse occurred at the Moon’s descending node of orbit on Friday, September 5, 1941, with an umbral magnitude of 0.0511. A lunar eclipse occurs when the Moon moves into the Earth's shadow, causing the Moon to be darkened. A partial lunar eclipse occurs when one part of the Moon is in the Earth's umbra, while the other part is in the Earth's penumbra. Unlike a solar eclipse, which can only be viewed from a relatively small area of the world, a lunar eclipse may be viewed from anywhere on the night side of Earth. Occurring about 5.9 days before apogee (on September 11, 1941, at 14:15 UTC), the Moon's apparent diameter was smaller.

== Visibility ==
The eclipse was completely visible over much of Asia, Australia, and Antarctica, seen rising over Africa and Europe and setting over northeast Asia and the central Pacific Ocean.

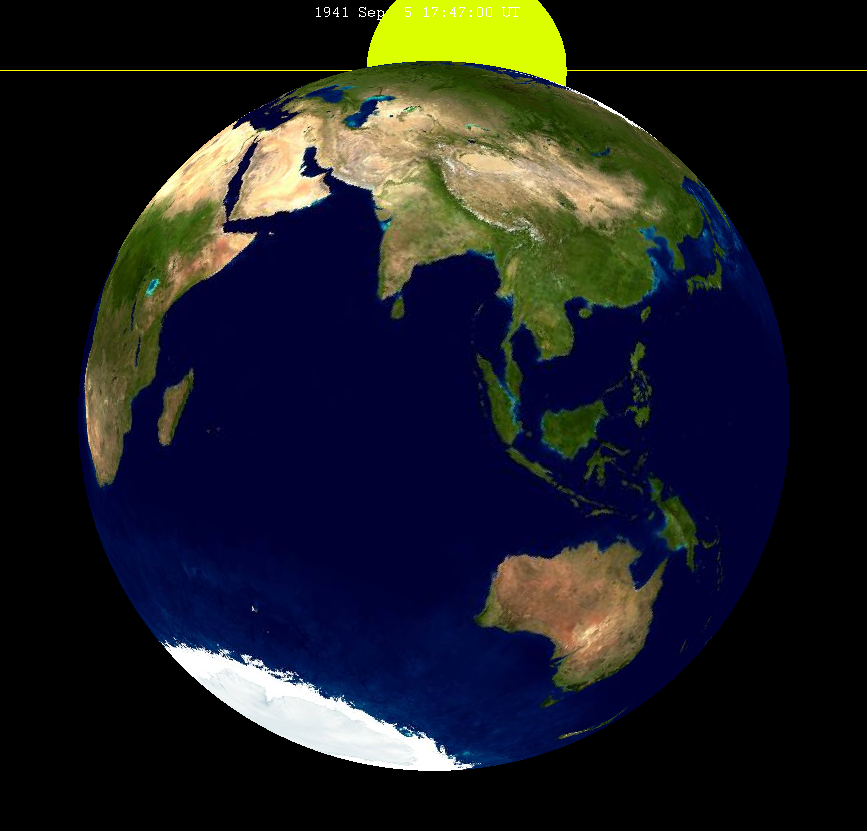
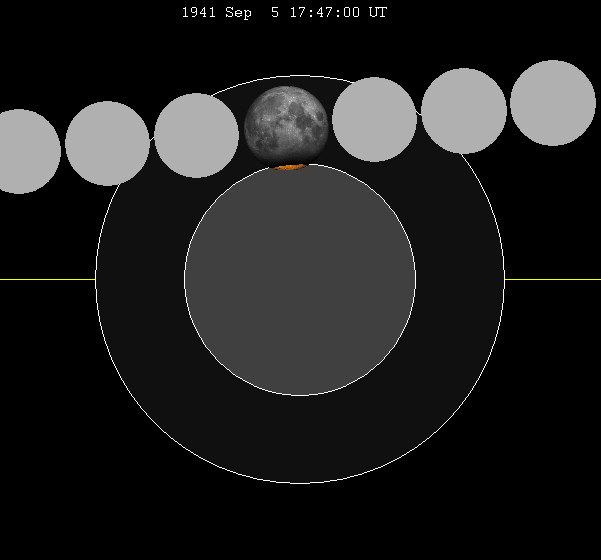

== Eclipse details ==
Shown below is a table displaying details about this particular solar eclipse. It describes various parameters pertaining to this eclipse.

September 5, 1941 Lunar Eclipse Parameters
Parameter	Value
Penumbral Magnitude	1.08839
Umbral Magnitude	0.05110
Gamma	0.97469
Sun Right Ascension	10h56m24.2s
Sun Declination	+06°46'29.9"
Sun Semi-Diameter	15'52.1"
Sun Equatorial Horizontal Parallax	08.7"
Moon Right Ascension	22h55m20.3s
Moon Declination	-05°54'07.9"
Moon Semi-Diameter	15'17.9"
Moon Equatorial Horizontal Parallax	0°56'08.6"
ΔT	25.2 s

== Eclipse season ==
This eclipse is part of an eclipse season, a period, roughly every six months, when eclipses occur. Only two (or occasionally three) eclipse seasons occur each year, and each season lasts about 35 days and repeats just short of six months (173 days) later; thus two full eclipse seasons always occur each year. Either two or three eclipses happen each eclipse season. In the sequence below, each eclipse is separated by a fortnight.

Eclipse season of September 1941
September 5 Descending node (full moon)	September 21 Ascending node (new moon)
Partial lunar eclipse Lunar Saros 117	Total solar eclipse Solar Saros 143

== Related eclipses ==
=== Eclipses in 1941 ===
- A partial lunar eclipse on March 13.
- An annular solar eclipse on March 27.
- A partial lunar eclipse on September 5.
- A total solar eclipse on September 21.

=== Metonic ===
- Preceded by: Lunar eclipse of November 18, 1937
- Followed by: Lunar eclipse of June 25, 1945

=== Tzolkinex ===
- Preceded by: Lunar eclipse of July 26, 1934
- Followed by: Lunar eclipse of October 18, 1948

=== Half-Saros ===
- Preceded by: Solar eclipse of August 31, 1932
- Followed by: Solar eclipse of September 12, 1950

=== Tritos ===
- Preceded by: Lunar eclipse of October 7, 1930
- Followed by: Lunar eclipse of August 5, 1952

=== Lunar Saros 117 ===
- Preceded by: Lunar eclipse of August 26, 1923
- Followed by: Lunar eclipse of September 17, 1959

=== Inex ===
- Preceded by: Lunar eclipse of September 26, 1912
- Followed by: Lunar eclipse of August 17, 1970

=== Triad ===
- Preceded by: Lunar eclipse of November 4, 1854
- Followed by: Lunar eclipse of July 6, 2028

=== Lunar eclipses of 1940–1944 ===
This eclipse is a member of a semester series. An eclipse in a semester series of lunar eclipses repeats approximately every 177 days and 4 hours (a semester) at alternating nodes of the Moon's orbit.

The penumbral lunar eclipses on April 22, 1940 and October 16, 1940 occur in the previous lunar year eclipse set, and the penumbral lunar eclipses on July 6, 1944 and December 29, 1944 occur in the next lunar year eclipse set.

Lunar eclipse series sets from 1940 to 1944
Ascending node				Descending node			
Saros	Date Viewing	Type Chart	Gamma	Saros	Date Viewing	Type Chart	Gamma
102	1940 Mar 23	Penumbral	−1.5034	107			
112	1941 Mar 13	Partial	−0.8437	117	1941 Sep 05	Partial	0.9747
122	1942 Mar 03	Total	−0.1545	127	1942 Aug 26	Total	0.1818
132	1943 Feb 20	Partial	0.5752	137	1943 Aug 15	Partial	−0.5534
142	1944 Feb 09	Penumbral	1.2698	147	1944 Aug 04	Penumbral	−1.2843

=== Saros 117 ===
This eclipse is a part of Saros series 117, repeating every 18 years, 11 days, and containing 71 events. The series started with a penumbral lunar eclipse on April 3, 1094. It contains partial eclipses from June 29, 1238 through September 23, 1382; total eclipses from October 3, 1400 through June 21, 1815; and a second set of partial eclipses from July 2, 1833 through September 5, 1941. The series ends at member 71 as a penumbral eclipse on May 15, 2356.

The longest duration of totality was produced by member 35 at 105 minutes, 43 seconds on April 17, 1707. All eclipses in this series occur at the Moon’s descending node of orbit.

Greatest	First			
The greatest eclipse of the series occurred on 1707 Apr 17, lasting 105 minutes, 43 seconds.	Penumbral	Partial	Total	Central
The greatest eclipse of the series occurred on 1707 Apr 17, lasting 105 minutes, 43 seconds.	1094 Apr 03	1238 Jun 29	1400 Oct 03	1563 Jan 09
The greatest eclipse of the series occurred on 1707 Apr 17, lasting 105 minutes, 43 seconds.	Last			
The greatest eclipse of the series occurred on 1707 Apr 17, lasting 105 minutes, 43 seconds.	Central	Total	Partial	Penumbral
The greatest eclipse of the series occurred on 1707 Apr 17, lasting 105 minutes, 43 seconds.	1761 May 18	1815 Jun 21	1941 Sep 05	2356 May 15

Eclipses are tabulated in three columns; every third eclipse in the same column is one exeligmos apart, so they all cast shadows over approximately the same parts of the Earth.

Series members 41–62 occur between 1801 and 2200:
41	42	43
1815 Jun 21	1833 Jul 02	1851 Jul 13
44	45	46
1869 Jul 23	1887 Aug 03	1905 Aug 15
47	48	49
1923 Aug 26	1941 Sep 05	1959 Sep 17
50	51	52
1977 Sep 27	1995 Oct 08	2013 Oct 18
53	54	55
2031 Oct 30	2049 Nov 09	2067 Nov 21
56	57	58
2085 Dec 01	2103 Dec 13	2121 Dec 24
59	60	61
2140 Jan 04	2158 Jan 14	2176 Jan 26
62
2194 Feb 05

=== Tritos series ===
This eclipse is a part of a tritos cycle, repeating at alternating nodes every 135 synodic months (≈ 3986.63 days, or 11 years minus 1 month). Their appearance and longitude are irregular due to a lack of synchronization with the anomalistic month (period of perigee), but groupings of 3 tritos cycles (≈ 33 years minus 3 months) come close (≈ 434.044 anomalistic months), so eclipses are similar in these groupings.

Series members between 1801 and 2200
1810 Sep 13 (Saros 105)	1821 Aug 13 (Saros 106)	1832 Jul 12 (Saros 107)	1843 Jun 12 (Saros 108)	1854 May 12 (Saros 109)
1865 Apr 11 (Saros 110)	1876 Mar 10 (Saros 111)	1887 Feb 08 (Saros 112)	1898 Jan 08 (Saros 113)	1908 Dec 07 (Saros 114)
1919 Nov 07 (Saros 115)	1930 Oct 07 (Saros 116)	1941 Sep 05 (Saros 117)	1952 Aug 05 (Saros 118)	1963 Jul 06 (Saros 119)
1974 Jun 04 (Saros 120)	1985 May 04 (Saros 121)	1996 Apr 04 (Saros 122)	2007 Mar 03 (Saros 123)	2018 Jan 31 (Saros 124)
2028 Dec 31 (Saros 125)	2039 Nov 30 (Saros 126)	2050 Oct 30 (Saros 127)	2061 Sep 29 (Saros 128)	2072 Aug 28 (Saros 129)
2083 Jul 29 (Saros 130)	2094 Jun 28 (Saros 131)	2105 May 28 (Saros 132)	2116 Apr 27 (Saros 133)	2127 Mar 28 (Saros 134)
2138 Feb 24 (Saros 135)	2149 Jan 23 (Saros 136)	2159 Dec 24 (Saros 137)	2170 Nov 23 (Saros 138)	2181 Oct 22 (Saros 139)
2192 Sep 21 (Saros 140)

=== Inex series ===
This eclipse is a part of the long period inex cycle, repeating at alternating nodes, every 358 synodic months (≈ 10,571.95 days, or 29 years minus 20 days). Their appearance and longitude are irregular due to a lack of synchronization with the anomalistic month (period of perigee). However, groupings of 3 inex cycles (≈ 87 years minus 2 months) comes close (≈ 1,151.02 anomalistic months), so eclipses are similar in these groupings.

Series members between 1801 and 2200
1825 Nov 25 (Saros 113)	1854 Nov 04 (Saros 114)	1883 Oct 16 (Saros 115)
1912 Sep 26 (Saros 116)	1941 Sep 05 (Saros 117)	1970 Aug 17 (Saros 118)
1999 Jul 28 (Saros 119)	2028 Jul 06 (Saros 120)	2057 Jun 17 (Saros 121)
2086 May 28 (Saros 122)	2115 May 08 (Saros 123)	2144 Apr 18 (Saros 124)
2173 Mar 29 (Saros 125)

=== Half-Saros cycle ===
A lunar eclipse will be preceded and followed by solar eclipses by 9 years and 5.5 days (a half saros). This lunar eclipse is related to two total solar eclipses of Solar Saros 124.

August 31, 1932	September 12, 1950

== See also ==
- List of lunar eclipses and List of 21st-century lunar eclipses
