= August 1988 lunar eclipse =

Astronomical event

- Partial eclipse
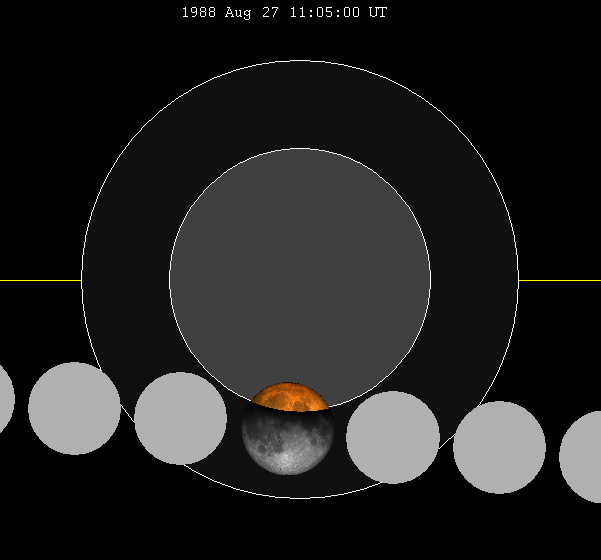
- The Moon's hourly motion shown right to left
- Date: August 27, 1988
- Gamma: −0.8682
- Magnitude: 0.2916
- Saros cycle: 118 (50 of 74)
- Partiality: 112 minutes, 58 seconds
- Penumbral: 262 minutes, 33 seconds
Contacts (UTC)
- P1: 8:53:16
- U1: 10:08:04
- Greatest: 11:04:33
- U4: 12:01:02
- P4: 13:15:48

A partial lunar eclipse occurred at the Moon’s ascending node of orbit on Saturday, August 27, 1988, with an umbral magnitude of 0.2916. A lunar eclipse occurs when the Moon moves into the Earth's shadow, causing the Moon to be darkened. A partial lunar eclipse occurs when one part of the Moon is in the Earth's umbra, while the other part is in the Earth's penumbra. Unlike a solar eclipse, which can only be viewed from a relatively small area of the world, a lunar eclipse may be viewed from anywhere on the night side of Earth. Occurring only about 7 hours before perigee (on August 17, 1988, at 17:50 UTC), the Moon's apparent diameter was larger.

== Visibility ==
The eclipse was completely visible over eastern Australia, western North America, and much of the Pacific Ocean, seen rising over western Australia and the eastern half of Asia and setting over much of North America and South America.

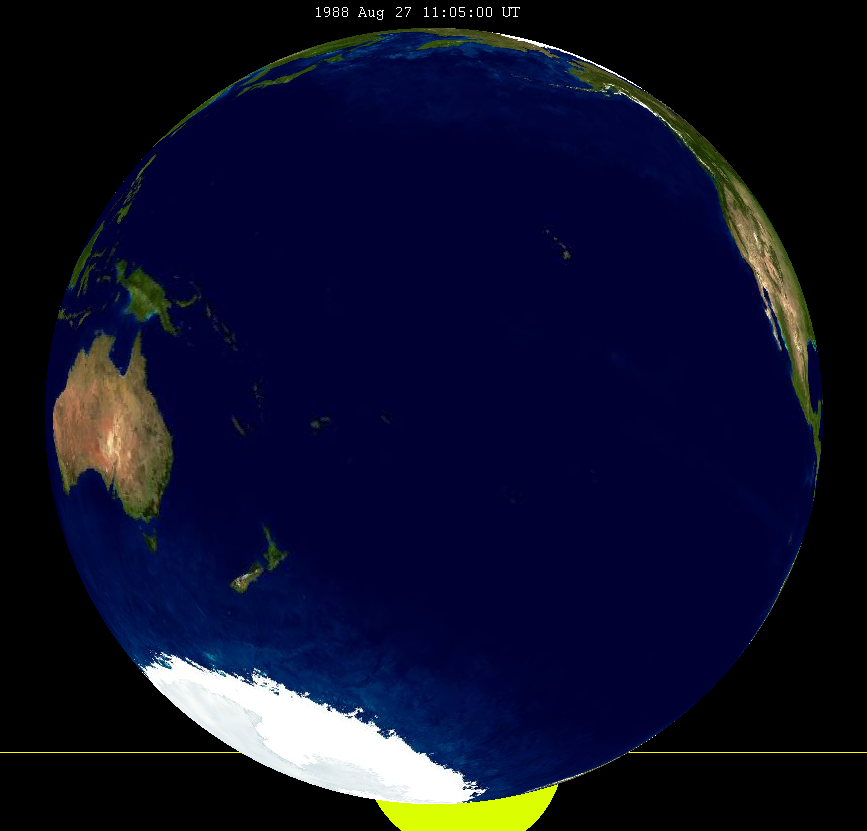
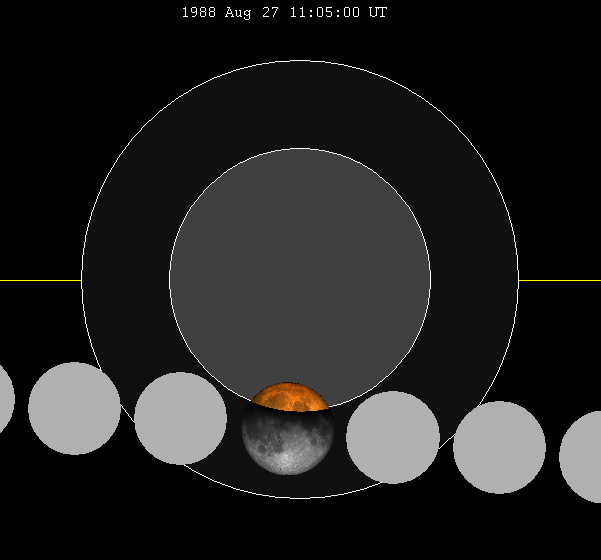

== Eclipse details ==
Shown below is a table displaying details about this particular solar eclipse. It describes various parameters pertaining to this eclipse.

August 27, 1988 Lunar Eclipse Parameters
Parameter	Value
Penumbral Magnitude	1.23803
Umbral Magnitude	0.29159
Gamma	−0.86816
Sun Right Ascension	10h25m02.1s
Sun Declination	+09°54'10.9"
Sun Semi-Diameter	15'50.0"
Sun Equatorial Horizontal Parallax	08.7"
Moon Right Ascension	22h26m40.4s
Moon Declination	-10°41'41.3"
Moon Semi-Diameter	16'43.7"
Moon Equatorial Horizontal Parallax	1°01'23.7"
ΔT	56.1 s

== Eclipse season ==
This eclipse is part of an eclipse season, a period, roughly every six months, when eclipses occur. Only two (or occasionally three) eclipse seasons occur each year, and each season lasts about 35 days and repeats just short of six months (173 days) later; thus two full eclipse seasons always occur each year. Either two or three eclipses happen each eclipse season. In the sequence below, each eclipse is separated by a fortnight.

Eclipse season of August–September 1988
August 27 Ascending node (full moon)	September 11 Descending node (new moon)
Partial lunar eclipse Lunar Saros 118	Annular solar eclipse Solar Saros 144

== Related eclipses ==
=== Eclipses in 1988 ===
- A penumbral lunar eclipse on March 3.
- A total solar eclipse on March 18.
- A partial lunar eclipse on August 27.
- An annular solar eclipse on September 11.

=== Metonic ===
- Preceded by: Lunar eclipse of November 8, 1984
- Followed by: Lunar eclipse of June 15, 1992

=== Tzolkinex ===
- Preceded by: Lunar eclipse of July 17, 1981
- Followed by: Lunar eclipse of October 8, 1995

=== Half-Saros ===
- Preceded by: Solar eclipse of August 22, 1979
- Followed by: Solar eclipse of September 2, 1997

=== Tritos ===
- Preceded by: Lunar eclipse of September 27, 1977
- Followed by: Lunar eclipse of July 28, 1999

=== Lunar Saros 118 ===
- Preceded by: Lunar eclipse of August 17, 1970
- Followed by: Lunar eclipse of September 7, 2006

=== Inex ===
- Preceded by: Lunar eclipse of September 17, 1959
- Followed by: Lunar eclipse of August 7, 2017

=== Triad ===
- Preceded by: Lunar eclipse of October 27, 1901
- Followed by: Lunar eclipse of June 28, 2075

=== Lunar eclipses of 1988–1991 ===
This eclipse is a member of a semester series. An eclipse in a semester series of lunar eclipses repeats approximately every 177 days and 4 hours (a semester) at alternating nodes of the Moon's orbit.

The lunar eclipses on June 27, 1991 (penumbral) and December 21, 1991 (partial) occur in the next lunar year eclipse set.

Lunar eclipse series sets from 1988 to 1991
Descending node				Ascending node			
Saros	Date Viewing	Type Chart	Gamma	Saros	Date Viewing	Type Chart	Gamma
113	1988 Mar 03	Penumbral	0.9886	118	1988 Aug 27	Partial	−0.8682
123	1989 Feb 20	Total	0.2935	128	1989 Aug 17	Total	−0.1491
133	1990 Feb 09	Total	−0.4148	138	1990 Aug 06	Partial	0.6374
143	1991 Jan 30	Penumbral	−1.0752	148	1991 Jul 26	Penumbral	1.4370

=== Metonic series ===
The Metonic cycle repeats nearly exactly every 19 years and represents a Saros cycle plus one lunar year. Because it occurs on the same calendar date, the Earth's shadow will be in nearly the same location relative to the background stars.

1. 1988 Mar 03.675 – Partial (113); 2. 2007 Mar 03.972 – Total (123); 3. 2026 Mar 03.481 – Total (133); 4. 2045 Mar 03.320 – Penumbral (143)	1. 1988 Aug 27.461 – partial (118); 2. 2007 Aug 28.442 – total (128); 3. 2026 Aug 28.175 – partial (138); 4. 2045 Aug 27.578 – penumbral (148)

=== Saros 118 ===
This eclipse is a part of Saros series 118, repeating every 18 years, 11 days, and containing 73 events. The series started with a penumbral lunar eclipse on March 2, 1105. It contains partial eclipses from June 8, 1267 through August 12, 1375; total eclipses from August 22, 1393 through June 22, 1880; and a second set of partial eclipses from July 3, 1898 through September 18, 2024. The series ends at member 73 as a penumbral eclipse on May 7, 2403.

The longest duration of totality was produced by member 37 at 99 minutes, 22 seconds on April 7, 1754. All eclipses in this series occur at the Moon’s ascending node of orbit.

Greatest	First			
The greatest eclipse of the series occurred on 1754 Apr 07, lasting 99 minutes, 22 seconds.	Penumbral	Partial	Total	Central
The greatest eclipse of the series occurred on 1754 Apr 07, lasting 99 minutes, 22 seconds.	1105 Mar 02	1267 Jun 08	1393 Aug 22	1465 Oct 04
The greatest eclipse of the series occurred on 1754 Apr 07, lasting 99 minutes, 22 seconds.	Last			
The greatest eclipse of the series occurred on 1754 Apr 07, lasting 99 minutes, 22 seconds.	Central	Total	Partial	Penumbral
The greatest eclipse of the series occurred on 1754 Apr 07, lasting 99 minutes, 22 seconds.	1826 May 21	1880 Jun 22	2024 Sep 18	2403 May 07

Eclipses are tabulated in three columns; every third eclipse in the same column is one exeligmos apart, so they all cast shadows over approximately the same parts of the Earth.

Series members 40–61 occur between 1801 and 2200:
40	41	42
1808 May 10	1826 May 21	1844 May 31
43	44	45
1862 Jun 12	1880 Jun 22	1898 Jul 03
46	47	48
1916 Jul 15	1934 Jul 26	1952 Aug 05
49	50	51
1970 Aug 17	1988 Aug 27	2006 Sep 07
52	53	54
2024 Sep 18	2042 Sep 29	2060 Oct 09
55	56	57
2078 Oct 21	2096 Oct 31	2114 Nov 12
58	59	60
2132 Nov 23	2150 Dec 04	2168 Dec 14
61
2186 Dec 26

=== Tritos series ===
This eclipse is a part of a tritos cycle, repeating at alternating nodes every 135 synodic months (≈ 3986.63 days, or 11 years minus 1 month). Their appearance and longitude are irregular due to a lack of synchronization with the anomalistic month (period of perigee), but groupings of 3 tritos cycles (≈ 33 years minus 3 months) come close (≈ 434.044 anomalistic months), so eclipses are similar in these groupings.

Series members between 1801 and 2200
1803 Feb 06 (Saros 101)	1814 Jan 06 (Saros 102)	1824 Dec 06 (Saros 103)		1846 Oct 04 (Saros 105)
1857 Sep 04 (Saros 106)	1868 Aug 03 (Saros 107)	1879 Jul 03 (Saros 108)	1890 Jun 03 (Saros 109)	1901 May 03 (Saros 110)
1912 Apr 01 (Saros 111)	1923 Mar 03 (Saros 112)	1934 Jan 30 (Saros 113)	1944 Dec 29 (Saros 114)	1955 Nov 29 (Saros 115)
1966 Oct 29 (Saros 116)	1977 Sep 27 (Saros 117)	1988 Aug 27 (Saros 118)	1999 Jul 28 (Saros 119)	2010 Jun 26 (Saros 120)
2021 May 26 (Saros 121)	2032 Apr 25 (Saros 122)	2043 Mar 25 (Saros 123)	2054 Feb 22 (Saros 124)	2065 Jan 22 (Saros 125)
2075 Dec 22 (Saros 126)	2086 Nov 20 (Saros 127)	2097 Oct 21 (Saros 128)	2108 Sep 20 (Saros 129)	2119 Aug 20 (Saros 130)
2130 Jul 21 (Saros 131)	2141 Jun 19 (Saros 132)	2152 May 18 (Saros 133)	2163 Apr 19 (Saros 134)	2174 Mar 18 (Saros 135)
2185 Feb 14 (Saros 136)	2196 Jan 15 (Saros 137)			

=== Inex series ===
This eclipse is a part of the long period inex cycle, repeating at alternating nodes, every 358 synodic months (≈ 10,571.95 days, or 29 years minus 20 days). Their appearance and longitude are irregular due to a lack of synchronization with the anomalistic month (period of perigee). However, groupings of 3 inex cycles (≈ 87 years minus 2 months) comes close (≈ 1,151.02 anomalistic months), so eclipses are similar in these groupings.

Series members between 1801 and 2200
1814 Dec 26 (Saros 112)	1843 Dec 07 (Saros 113)	1872 Nov 15 (Saros 114)
1901 Oct 27 (Saros 115)	1930 Oct 07 (Saros 116)	1959 Sep 17 (Saros 117)
1988 Aug 27 (Saros 118)	2017 Aug 07 (Saros 119)	2046 Jul 18 (Saros 120)
2075 Jun 28 (Saros 121)	2104 Jun 08 (Saros 122)	2133 May 19 (Saros 123)
2162 Apr 29 (Saros 124)	2191 Apr 09 (Saros 125)	

=== Half-Saros cycle ===
A lunar eclipse will be preceded and followed by solar eclipses by 9 years and 5.5 days (a half saros). This lunar eclipse is related to two solar eclipses of Solar Saros 125.

August 22, 1979	September 2, 1997

== See also ==
- List of lunar eclipses
- List of 20th-century lunar eclipses
