= November 2020 lunar eclipse =

Penumbral lunar eclipse of 30 November 2020

- Penumbral eclipse
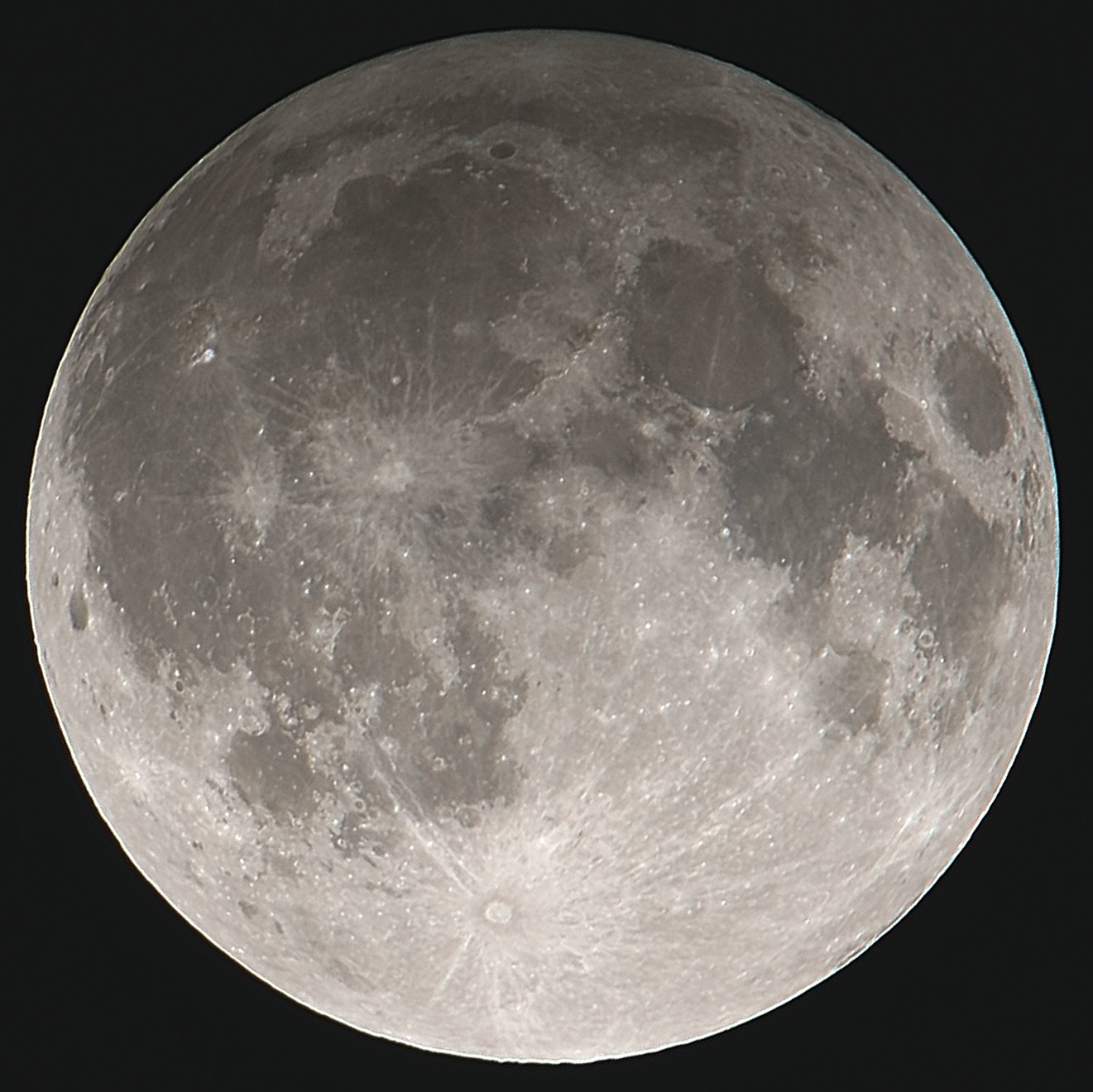
- Penumbral eclipse as viewed from Minneapolis, MN, 9:24 UTC
- Date: November 30, 2020
- Gamma: −1.1309
- Magnitude: −0.2602
- Saros cycle: 116 (58 of 73)
- Penumbral: 260 minutes, 59 seconds
Contacts (UTC)
- P1: 7:32:21
- Greatest: 9:42:49
- P4: 11:53:20

A penumbral lunar eclipse occurred at the Moon’s ascending node of orbit on Monday, November 30, 2020, with an umbral magnitude of −0.2602. A lunar eclipse occurs when the Moon moves into the Earth's shadow, causing the Moon to be darkened. A penumbral lunar eclipse occurs when part or all of the Moon's near side passes into the Earth's penumbra. Unlike a solar eclipse, which can only be viewed from a relatively small area of the world, a lunar eclipse may be viewed from anywhere on the night side of Earth. Occurring about 3.6 days after apogee (on November 26, 2020, at 19:30 UTC), the Moon's apparent diameter was smaller.

This eclipse was the last of four penumbral lunar eclipses in 2020, with the others occurring on January 10, June 5, and July 5.

== Visibility ==
The eclipse was completely visible over northeast Asia and North America, seen rising over east Asia and Australia and setting over South America.

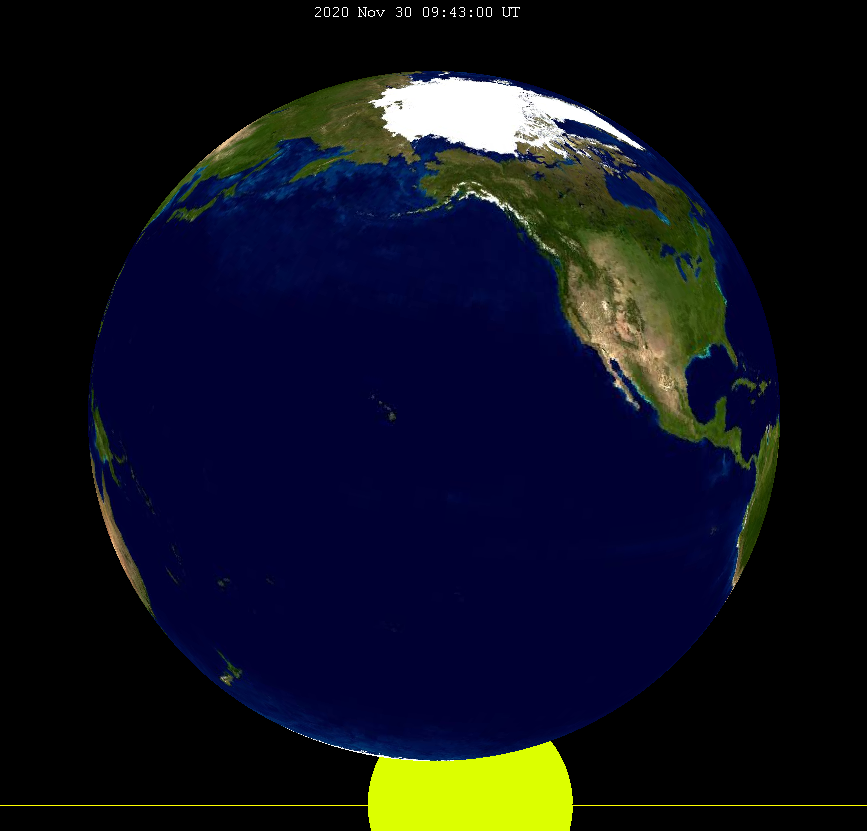
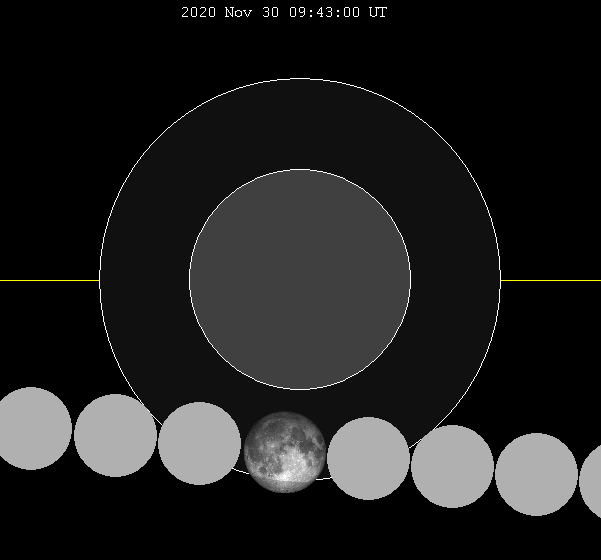
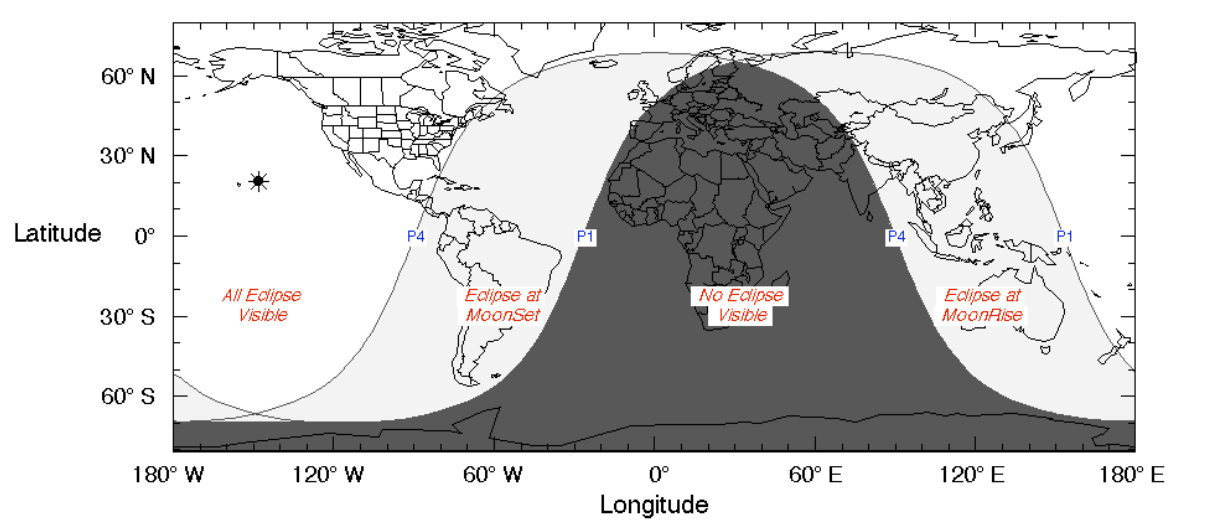
Visibility map

== Gallery ==
Minneapolis, 1:45 UT and 9:24 UT

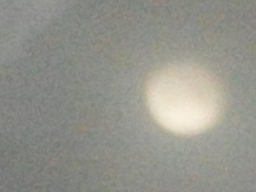
Edmonton, AB, 9:40 UT

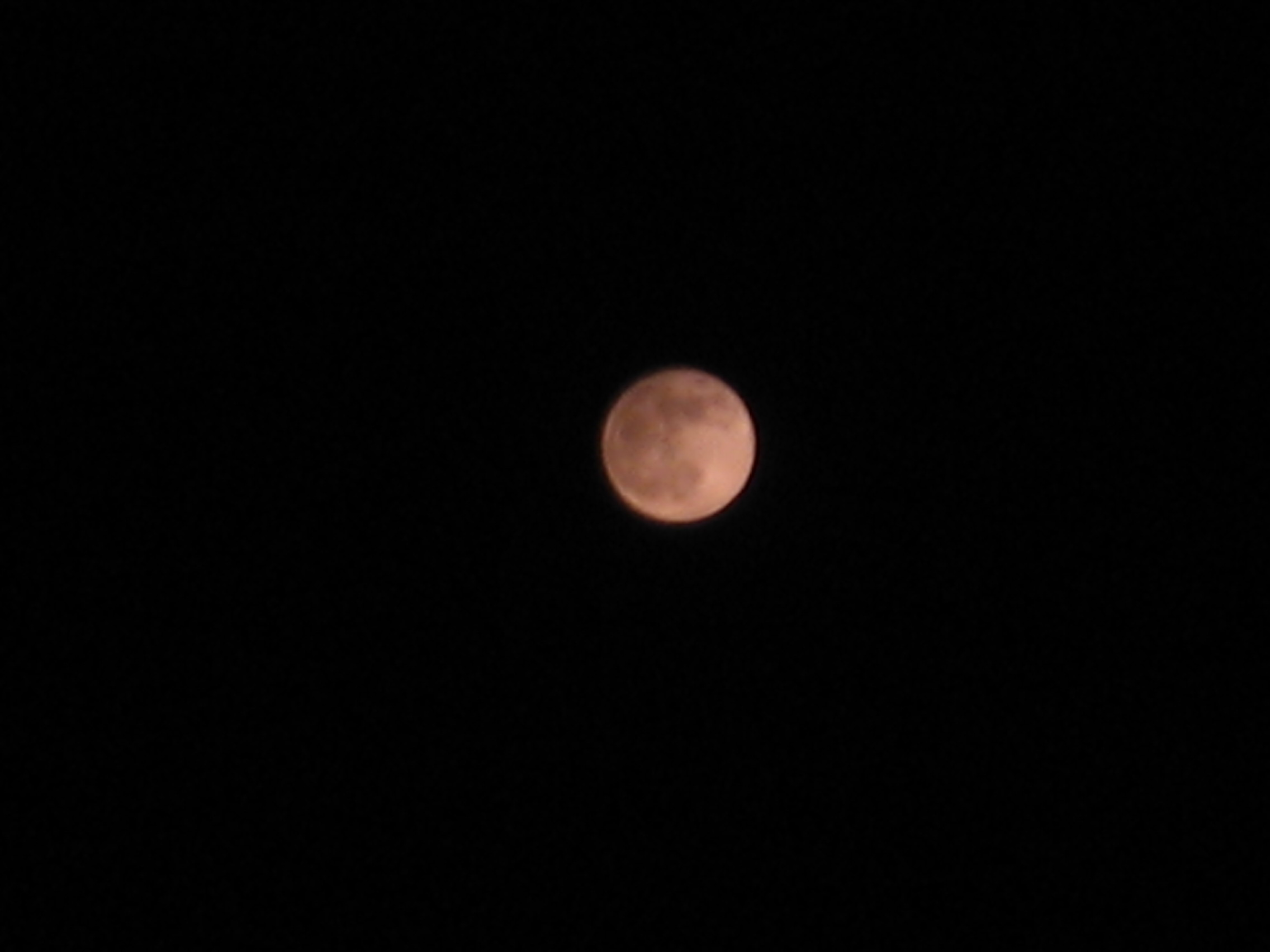
Hefei, China, 10:03 UTC

== Eclipse details ==
Shown below is a table displaying details about this particular lunar eclipse. It describes various parameters pertaining to this eclipse.

November 30, 2020 Lunar Eclipse Parameters
Parameter	Value
Penumbral Magnitude	0.83023
Umbral Magnitude	−0.26023
Gamma	−1.13094
Sun Right Ascension	16h27m40.0s
Sun Declination	-21°44'31.0"
Sun Semi-Diameter	16'13.1"
Sun Equatorial Horizontal Parallax	08.9"
Moon Right Ascension	04h28m46.7s
Moon Declination	+20°44'46.4"
Moon Semi-Diameter	14'52.4"
Moon Equatorial Horizontal Parallax	0°54'35.1"
ΔT	69.8 s

== Eclipse season ==
This eclipse is part of an eclipse season, a period, roughly every six months, when eclipses occur. Only two (or occasionally three) eclipse seasons occur each year, and each season lasts about 35 days and repeats just short of six months (173 days) later; thus two full eclipse seasons always occur each year. Either two or three eclipses happen each eclipse season. In the sequence below, each eclipse is separated by a fortnight.

Eclipse season of November–December 2020
November 30 Ascending node (full moon)	December 14 Descending node (new moon)
Penumbral lunar eclipse Lunar Saros 116	Total solar eclipse Solar Saros 142

== Related eclipses ==
=== Eclipses in 2020 ===
- A penumbral lunar eclipse on January 10.
- A penumbral lunar eclipse on June 5.
- An annular solar eclipse on June 21.
- A penumbral lunar eclipse on July 5.
- A penumbral lunar eclipse on November 30.
- A total solar eclipse on December 14.

=== Metonic ===
- Preceded by: Lunar eclipse of February 11, 2017
- Followed by: Lunar eclipse of September 18, 2024

=== Tzolkinex ===
- Preceded by: Lunar eclipse of October 18, 2013
- Followed by: Lunar eclipse of January 12, 2028

=== Half-Saros ===
- Preceded by: Solar eclipse of November 25, 2011
- Followed by: Solar eclipse of December 5, 2029

=== Tritos ===
- Preceded by: Lunar eclipse of December 31, 2009
- Followed by: Lunar eclipse of October 30, 2031

=== Lunar Saros 116 ===
- Preceded by: Lunar eclipse of November 20, 2002
- Followed by: Lunar eclipse of December 11, 2038

=== Inex ===
- Preceded by: Lunar eclipse of December 21, 1991
- Followed by: Lunar eclipse of November 9, 2049

=== Triad ===
- Preceded by: Lunar eclipse of January 30, 1934
- Followed by: Lunar eclipse of October 2, 2107

=== Lunar eclipses of 2020–2023 ===
This eclipse is a member of a semester series. An eclipse in a semester series of lunar eclipses repeats approximately every 177 days and 4 hours (a semester) at alternating nodes of the Moon's orbit.

The penumbral lunar eclipses on January 10, 2020 and July 5, 2020 occur in the previous lunar year eclipse set.

Lunar eclipse series sets from 2020 to 2023
Descending node				Ascending node			
Saros	Date Viewing	Type Chart	Gamma	Saros	Date Viewing	Type Chart	Gamma
111	2020 Jun 05	Penumbral	1.2406	116	2020 Nov 30	Penumbral	−1.1309
121	2021 May 26	Total	0.4774	126	2021 Nov 19	Partial	−0.4553
131	2022 May 16	Total	−0.2532	136	2022 Nov 08	Total	0.2570
141	2023 May 05	Penumbral	−1.0350	146	2023 Oct 28	Partial	0.9472

=== Saros 116 ===
This eclipse is a part of Saros series 116, repeating every 18 years, 11 days, and containing 73 events. The series started with a penumbral lunar eclipse on March 11, 993 AD. It contains partial eclipses from June 16, 1155 through September 11, 1299; total eclipses from September 21, 1317 through July 11, 1786; and a second set of partial eclipses from July 22, 1804 through October 7, 1930. The series ends at member 73 as a penumbral eclipse on May 14, 2291.

The longest duration of totality was produced by member 40 at 102 minutes, 40 seconds on May 16, 1696. All eclipses in this series occur at the Moon’s ascending node of orbit.

Greatest	First			
The greatest eclipse of the series occurred on 1696 May 16, lasting 102 minutes, 40 seconds.	Penumbral	Partial	Total	Central
The greatest eclipse of the series occurred on 1696 May 16, lasting 102 minutes, 40 seconds.	993 Mar 11	1155 Jun 16	1317 Sep 21	1588 Mar 13
The greatest eclipse of the series occurred on 1696 May 16, lasting 102 minutes, 40 seconds.	Last			
The greatest eclipse of the series occurred on 1696 May 16, lasting 102 minutes, 40 seconds.	Central	Total	Partial	Penumbral
The greatest eclipse of the series occurred on 1696 May 16, lasting 102 minutes, 40 seconds.	1750 Jun 19	1786 Jul 11	1930 Oct 07	2291 May 14

Eclipses are tabulated in three columns; every third eclipse in the same column is one exeligmos apart, so they all cast shadows over approximately the same parts of the Earth.

Series members 46–67 occur between 1801 and 2200:
46	47	48
1804 Jul 22	1822 Aug 03	1840 Aug 13
49	50	51
1858 Aug 24	1876 Sep 03	1894 Sep 15
52	53	54
1912 Sep 26	1930 Oct 07	1948 Oct 18
55	56	57
1966 Oct 29	1984 Nov 08	2002 Nov 20
58	59	60
2020 Nov 30	2038 Dec 11	2056 Dec 22
61	62	63
2075 Jan 02	2093 Jan 12	2111 Jan 25
64	65	66
2129 Feb 04	2147 Feb 15	2165 Feb 26
67
2183 Mar 09

=== Tritos series ===
This eclipse is a part of a tritos cycle, repeating at alternating nodes every 135 synodic months (≈ 3986.63 days, or 11 years minus 1 month). Their appearance and longitude are irregular due to a lack of synchronization with the anomalistic month (period of perigee), but groupings of 3 tritos cycles (≈ 33 years minus 3 months) come close (≈ 434.044 anomalistic months), so eclipses are similar in these groupings.

Series members between 1835 and 2200
1835 May 12 (Saros 99)	1846 Apr 11 (Saros 100)		1868 Feb 08 (Saros 102)	1879 Jan 08 (Saros 103)
				1933 Aug 05 (Saros 108)
1944 Jul 06 (Saros 109)	1955 Jun 05 (Saros 110)	1966 May 04 (Saros 111)	1977 Apr 04 (Saros 112)	1988 Mar 03 (Saros 113)
1999 Jan 31 (Saros 114)	2009 Dec 31 (Saros 115)	2020 Nov 30 (Saros 116)	2031 Oct 30 (Saros 117)	2042 Sep 29 (Saros 118)
2053 Aug 29 (Saros 119)	2064 Jul 28 (Saros 120)	2075 Jun 28 (Saros 121)	2086 May 28 (Saros 122)	2097 Apr 26 (Saros 123)
2108 Mar 27 (Saros 124)	2119 Feb 25 (Saros 125)	2130 Jan 24 (Saros 126)	2140 Dec 23 (Saros 127)	2151 Nov 24 (Saros 128)
2162 Oct 23 (Saros 129)	2173 Sep 21 (Saros 130)	2184 Aug 21 (Saros 131)	2195 Jul 22 (Saros 132)	

=== Inex series ===
This eclipse is a part of the long period inex cycle, repeating at alternating nodes, every 358 synodic months (≈ 10,571.95 days, or 29 years minus 20 days). Their appearance and longitude are irregular due to a lack of synchronization with the anomalistic month (period of perigee). However, groupings of 3 inex cycles (≈ 87 years minus 2 months) comes close (≈ 1,151.02 anomalistic months), so eclipses are similar in these groupings.

Series members between 1801 and 2200
1818 Apr 21 (Saros 109)	1847 Mar 31 (Saros 110)	1876 Mar 10 (Saros 111)
1905 Feb 19 (Saros 112)	1934 Jan 30 (Saros 113)	1963 Jan 09 (Saros 114)
1991 Dec 21 (Saros 115)	2020 Nov 30 (Saros 116)	2049 Nov 09 (Saros 117)
2078 Oct 21 (Saros 118)	2107 Oct 02 (Saros 119)	2136 Sep 10 (Saros 120)
2165 Aug 21 (Saros 121)	2194 Aug 02 (Saros 122)	

=== Half-Saros cycle ===
A lunar eclipse will be preceded and followed by solar eclipses by 9 years and 5.5 days (a half saros). This lunar eclipse is related to two partial solar eclipses of Solar Saros 123.

November 25, 2011	December 5, 2029

== See also ==
- List of lunar eclipses and List of 21st-century lunar eclipses
