= October 1930 lunar eclipse =

Partial lunar eclipse October 7th, 1930

- Partial eclipse
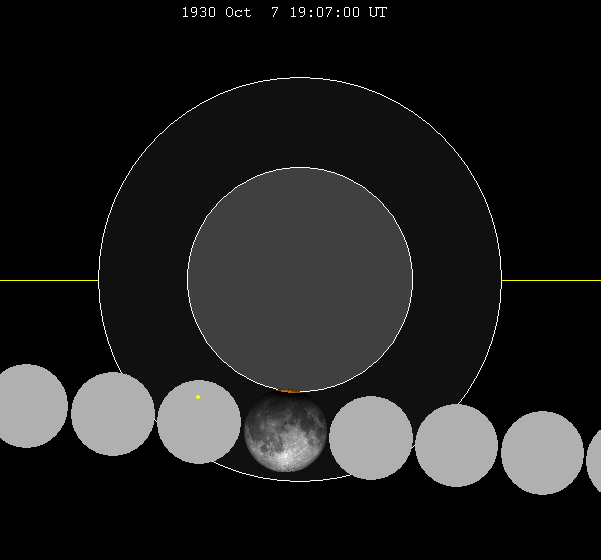
- The Moon's hourly motion shown right to left
- Date: October 7, 1930
- Gamma: −0.9812
- Magnitude: 0.0253
- Saros cycle: 116 (53 of 73)
- Partiality: 38 minutes, 18 seconds
- Penumbral: 286 minutes, 38 seconds
Contacts (UTC)
- P1: 16:43:27
- U1: 18:47:42
- Greatest: 19:06:46
- U4: 19:26:00
- P4: 21:30:05

A partial lunar eclipse occurred at the Moon’s ascending node of orbit on Tuesday, October 7, 1930, with an umbral magnitude of 0.0253. A lunar eclipse occurs when the Moon moves into the Earth's shadow, causing the Moon to be darkened. A partial lunar eclipse occurs when one part of the Moon is in the Earth's umbra, while the other part is in the Earth's penumbra. Unlike a solar eclipse, which can only be viewed from a relatively small area of the world, a lunar eclipse may be viewed from anywhere on the night side of Earth. Occurring about 4.4 days after apogee (on October 3, 1930, at 9:45 UTC), the Moon's apparent diameter was smaller.

== Visibility ==
The eclipse was completely visible over east Africa, eastern Europe, Asia, and western Australia, seen rising over west Africa, western Europe, and eastern South America and setting over eastern Australia and northeast Asia.

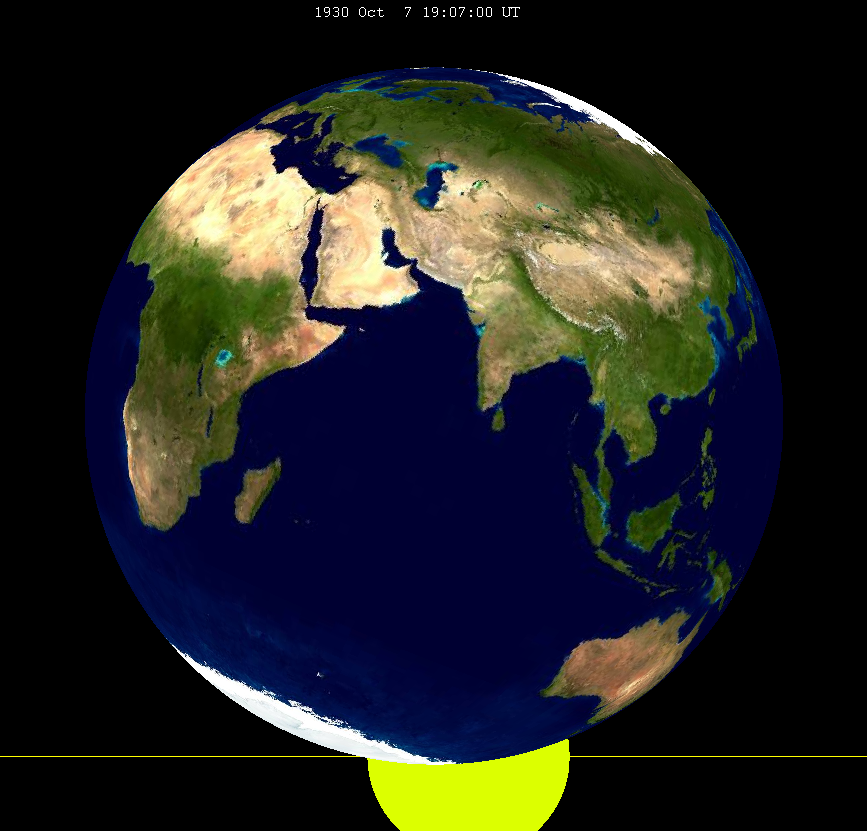
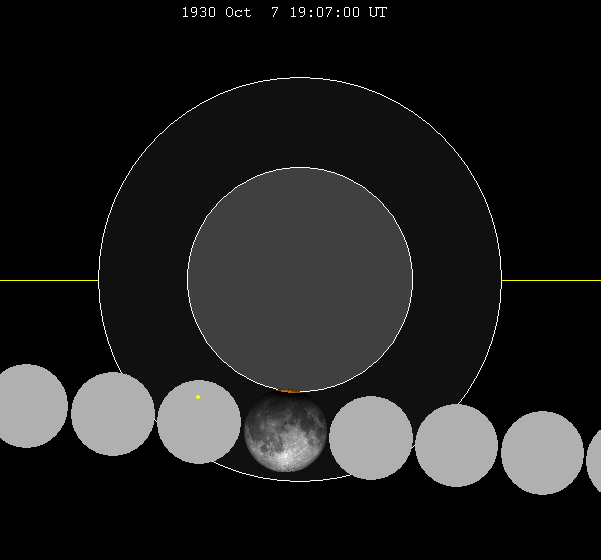

== Eclipse details ==
Shown below is a table displaying details about this particular lunar eclipse. It describes various parameters pertaining to this eclipse.

October 7, 1930 Lunar Eclipse Parameters
Parameter	Value
Penumbral Magnitude	1.09067
Umbral Magnitude	0.02525
Gamma	−0.98118
Sun Right Ascension	12h50m44.6s
Sun Declination	-05°26'30.5"
Sun Semi-Diameter	16'00.5"
Sun Equatorial Horizontal Parallax	08.8"
Moon Right Ascension	00h52m28.2s
Moon Declination	+04°38'57.1"
Moon Semi-Diameter	15'01.5"
Moon Equatorial Horizontal Parallax	0°55'08.6"
ΔT	24.1 s

== Eclipse season ==
This eclipse is part of an eclipse season, a period, roughly every six months, when eclipses occur. Only two (or occasionally three) eclipse seasons occur each year, and each season lasts about 35 days and repeats just short of six months (173 days) later; thus two full eclipse seasons always occur each year. Either two or three eclipses happen each eclipse season. In the sequence below, each eclipse is separated by a fortnight.

Eclipse season of October 1930
October 7 Ascending node (full moon)	October 21 Descending node (new moon)
Partial lunar eclipse Lunar Saros 116	Total solar eclipse Solar Saros 142

== Related eclipses ==
=== Eclipses in 1930 ===
- A partial lunar eclipse on April 13.
- A hybrid solar eclipse on April 28.
- A partial lunar eclipse on October 7.
- A total solar eclipse on October 21.

=== Metonic ===
- Preceded by: Lunar eclipse of December 19, 1926
- Followed by: Lunar eclipse of July 26, 1934

=== Tzolkinex ===
- Preceded by: Lunar eclipse of August 26, 1923
- Followed by: Lunar eclipse of November 18, 1937

=== Half-Saros ===
- Preceded by: Solar eclipse of October 1, 1921
- Followed by: Solar eclipse of October 12, 1939

=== Tritos ===
- Preceded by: Lunar eclipse of November 7, 1919
- Followed by: Lunar eclipse of September 5, 1941

=== Lunar Saros 116 ===
- Preceded by: Lunar eclipse of September 26, 1912
- Followed by: Lunar eclipse of October 18, 1948

=== Inex ===
- Preceded by: Lunar eclipse of October 27, 1901
- Followed by: Lunar eclipse of September 17, 1959

=== Triad ===
- Preceded by: Lunar eclipse of December 7, 1843
- Followed by: Lunar eclipse of August 7, 2017

=== Lunar eclipses of 1930–1933 ===
This eclipse is a member of a semester series. An eclipse in a semester series of lunar eclipses repeats approximately every 177 days and 4 hours (a semester) at alternating nodes of the Moon's orbit.

The penumbral lunar eclipses on February 10, 1933 and August 5, 1933 occur in the next lunar year eclipse set.

Lunar eclipse series sets from 1930 to 1933
Descending node				Ascending node			
Saros	Date Viewing	Type Chart	Gamma	Saros	Date Viewing	Type Chart	Gamma
111	1930 Apr 13	Partial	0.9545	116	1930 Oct 07	Partial	−0.9812
121	1931 Apr 02	Total	0.2043	126	1931 Sep 26	Total	−0.2698
131	1932 Mar 22	Partial	−0.4956	136	1932 Sep 14	Partial	0.4664
141	1933 Mar 12	Penumbral	−1.2369	146	1933 Sep 04	Penumbral	1.1776

=== Saros 116 ===
This eclipse is a part of Saros series 116, repeating every 18 years, 11 days, and containing 73 events. The series started with a penumbral lunar eclipse on March 11, 993 AD. It contains partial eclipses from June 16, 1155 through September 11, 1299; total eclipses from September 21, 1317 through July 11, 1786; and a second set of partial eclipses from July 22, 1804 through October 7, 1930. The series ends at member 73 as a penumbral eclipse on May 14, 2291.

The longest duration of totality was produced by member 40 at 102 minutes, 40 seconds on May 16, 1696. All eclipses in this series occur at the Moon’s ascending node of orbit.

Greatest	First			
The greatest eclipse of the series occurred on 1696 May 16, lasting 102 minutes, 40 seconds.	Penumbral	Partial	Total	Central
The greatest eclipse of the series occurred on 1696 May 16, lasting 102 minutes, 40 seconds.	993 Mar 11	1155 Jun 16	1317 Sep 21	1588 Mar 13
The greatest eclipse of the series occurred on 1696 May 16, lasting 102 minutes, 40 seconds.	Last			
The greatest eclipse of the series occurred on 1696 May 16, lasting 102 minutes, 40 seconds.	Central	Total	Partial	Penumbral
The greatest eclipse of the series occurred on 1696 May 16, lasting 102 minutes, 40 seconds.	1750 Jun 19	1786 Jul 11	1930 Oct 07	2291 May 14

Eclipses are tabulated in three columns; every third eclipse in the same column is one exeligmos apart, so they all cast shadows over approximately the same parts of the Earth.

Series members 46–67 occur between 1801 and 2200:
46	47	48
1804 Jul 22	1822 Aug 03	1840 Aug 13
49	50	51
1858 Aug 24	1876 Sep 03	1894 Sep 15
52	53	54
1912 Sep 26	1930 Oct 07	1948 Oct 18
55	56	57
1966 Oct 29	1984 Nov 08	2002 Nov 20
58	59	60
2020 Nov 30	2038 Dec 11	2056 Dec 22
61	62	63
2075 Jan 02	2093 Jan 12	2111 Jan 25
64	65	66
2129 Feb 04	2147 Feb 15	2165 Feb 26
67
2183 Mar 09

=== Tritos series ===
This eclipse is a part of a tritos cycle, repeating at alternating nodes every 135 synodic months (≈ 3986.63 days, or 11 years minus 1 month). Their appearance and longitude are irregular due to a lack of synchronization with the anomalistic month (period of perigee), but groupings of 3 tritos cycles (≈ 33 years minus 3 months) come close (≈ 434.044 anomalistic months), so eclipses are similar in these groupings.

Series members between 1801 and 2200
1810 Sep 13 (Saros 105)	1821 Aug 13 (Saros 106)	1832 Jul 12 (Saros 107)	1843 Jun 12 (Saros 108)	1854 May 12 (Saros 109)
1865 Apr 11 (Saros 110)	1876 Mar 10 (Saros 111)	1887 Feb 08 (Saros 112)	1898 Jan 08 (Saros 113)	1908 Dec 07 (Saros 114)
1919 Nov 07 (Saros 115)	1930 Oct 07 (Saros 116)	1941 Sep 05 (Saros 117)	1952 Aug 05 (Saros 118)	1963 Jul 06 (Saros 119)
1974 Jun 04 (Saros 120)	1985 May 04 (Saros 121)	1996 Apr 04 (Saros 122)	2007 Mar 03 (Saros 123)	2018 Jan 31 (Saros 124)
2028 Dec 31 (Saros 125)	2039 Nov 30 (Saros 126)	2050 Oct 30 (Saros 127)	2061 Sep 29 (Saros 128)	2072 Aug 28 (Saros 129)
2083 Jul 29 (Saros 130)	2094 Jun 28 (Saros 131)	2105 May 28 (Saros 132)	2116 Apr 27 (Saros 133)	2127 Mar 28 (Saros 134)
2138 Feb 24 (Saros 135)	2149 Jan 23 (Saros 136)	2159 Dec 24 (Saros 137)	2170 Nov 23 (Saros 138)	2181 Oct 22 (Saros 139)
2192 Sep 21 (Saros 140)

=== Inex series ===
This eclipse is a part of the long period inex cycle, repeating at alternating nodes, every 358 synodic months (≈ 10,571.95 days, or 29 years minus 20 days). Their appearance and longitude are irregular due to a lack of synchronization with the anomalistic month (period of perigee). However, groupings of 3 inex cycles (≈ 87 years minus 2 months) comes close (≈ 1,151.02 anomalistic months), so eclipses are similar in these groupings.

Series members between 1801 and 2200
1814 Dec 26 (Saros 112)	1843 Dec 07 (Saros 113)	1872 Nov 15 (Saros 114)
1901 Oct 27 (Saros 115)	1930 Oct 07 (Saros 116)	1959 Sep 17 (Saros 117)
1988 Aug 27 (Saros 118)	2017 Aug 07 (Saros 119)	2046 Jul 18 (Saros 120)
2075 Jun 28 (Saros 121)	2104 Jun 08 (Saros 122)	2133 May 19 (Saros 123)
2162 Apr 29 (Saros 124)	2191 Apr 09 (Saros 125)	

=== Half-Saros cycle ===
A lunar eclipse will be preceded and followed by solar eclipses by 9 years and 5.5 days (a half saros). This lunar eclipse is related to two total solar eclipses of Solar Saros 123.

October 1, 1921	October 12, 1939

== See also ==
- List of lunar eclipses and List of 21st-century lunar eclipses
