= November 2002 lunar eclipse =

Penumbral lunar eclipse 20 November 2002

- Penumbral eclipse
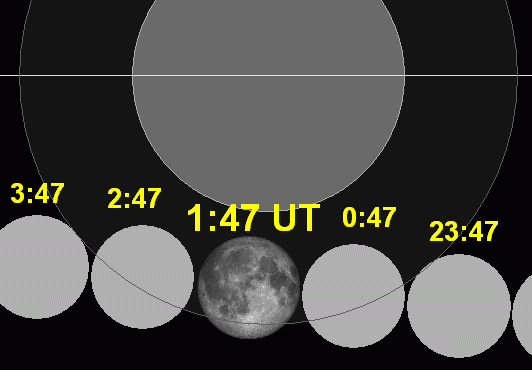
- Hourly motion shown right to left
- Date: November 20, 2002
- Gamma: −1.1126
- Magnitude: −0.2246
- Saros cycle: 116 (57 of 73)
- Penumbral: 264 minutes, 18 seconds
Contacts (UTC)
- P1: 23:34:28
- Greatest: 1:46:36
- P4: 3:58:46

A penumbral lunar eclipse occurred at the Moon’s ascending node of orbit on Wednesday, November 20, 2002, with an umbral magnitude of −0.2246. A lunar eclipse occurs when the Moon moves into the Earth's shadow, causing the Moon to be darkened. A penumbral lunar eclipse occurs when part or all of the Moon's near side passes into the Earth's penumbra. Unlike a solar eclipse, which can only be viewed from a relatively small area of the world, a lunar eclipse may be viewed from anywhere on the night side of Earth. Occurring about 3.8 days after apogee (on November 16, 2002, at 6:30 UTC), the Moon's apparent diameter was smaller.

== Visibility ==
The eclipse was completely visible much of North and South America, Africa, and Europe, seen rising over western North America and the eastern Pacific Ocean and setting over east Africa and west, central, and south Asia.

The moon's hourly motion across the Earth's shadow in the constellation of Taurus.

== Eclipse details ==
Shown below is a table displaying details about this particular solar eclipse. It describes various parameters pertaining to this eclipse.

November 20, 2002 Lunar Eclipse Parameters
Parameter	Value
Penumbral Magnitude	0.86176
Umbral Magnitude	−0.22459
Gamma	−1.11266
Sun Right Ascension	15h41m07.8s
Sun Declination	-19°36'53.3"
Sun Semi-Diameter	16'11.2"
Sun Equatorial Horizontal Parallax	08.9"
Moon Right Ascension	03h42m30.3s
Moon Declination	+18°39'15.4"
Moon Semi-Diameter	14'54.0"
Moon Equatorial Horizontal Parallax	0°54'40.9"
ΔT	64.4 s

== Eclipse season ==
This eclipse is part of an eclipse season, a period, roughly every six months, when eclipses occur. Only two (or occasionally three) eclipse seasons occur each year, and each season lasts about 35 days and repeats just short of six months (173 days) later; thus two full eclipse seasons always occur each year. Either two or three eclipses happen each eclipse season. In the sequence below, each eclipse is separated by a fortnight.

Eclipse season of November–December 2002
November 20 Ascending node (full moon)	December 4 Descending node (new moon)
Penumbral lunar eclipse Lunar Saros 116	Total solar eclipse Solar Saros 142

== Related eclipses ==
=== Eclipses in 2002 ===
- A penumbral lunar eclipse on May 26.
- An annular solar eclipse on June 10.
- A penumbral lunar eclipse on June 24.
- A penumbral lunar eclipse on November 20.
- A total solar eclipse on December 4.

=== Metonic ===
- Preceded by: Lunar eclipse of January 31, 1999
- Followed by: Lunar eclipse of September 7, 2006

=== Tzolkinex ===
- Preceded by: Lunar eclipse of October 8, 1995
- Followed by: Lunar eclipse of December 31, 2009

=== Half-Saros ===
- Preceded by: Solar eclipse of November 13, 1993
- Followed by: Solar eclipse of November 25, 2011

=== Tritos ===
- Preceded by: Lunar eclipse of December 21, 1991
- Followed by: Lunar eclipse of October 18, 2013

=== Lunar Saros 116 ===
- Preceded by: Lunar eclipse of November 8, 1984
- Followed by: Lunar eclipse of November 30, 2020

=== Inex ===
- Preceded by: Lunar eclipse of December 10, 1973
- Followed by: Lunar eclipse of October 30, 2031

=== Triad ===
- Preceded by: Lunar eclipse of January 20, 1916
- Followed by: Lunar eclipse of September 19, 2089

=== Lunar eclipses of 2002–2005 ===
This eclipse is a member of a semester series. An eclipse in a semester series of lunar eclipses repeats approximately every 177 days and 4 hours (a semester) at alternating nodes of the Moon's orbit.

The penumbral lunar eclipse on June 24, 2002 occurs in the previous lunar year eclipse set.

Lunar eclipse series sets from 2002 to 2005
Descending node				Ascending node			
Saros	Date Viewing	Type Chart	Gamma	Saros	Date Viewing	Type Chart	Gamma
111	2002 May 26	Penumbral	1.1759	116	2002 Nov 20	Penumbral	−1.1127
121	2003 May 16	Total	0.4123	126	2003 Nov 09	Total	−0.4319
131	2004 May 04	Total	−0.3132	136	2004 Oct 28	Total	0.2846
141	2005 Apr 24	Penumbral	−1.0885	146	2005 Oct 17	Partial	0.9796

=== Metonic series ===
- First eclipse: 20 November 2002.
- Second eclipse: 19 November 2021.
- Third eclipse: 18 November 2040.
- Fourth eclipse: 19 November 2059.
- Fifth eclipse: 19 November 2078.

=== Saros 116 ===
This eclipse is a part of Saros series 116, repeating every 18 years, 11 days, and containing 73 events. The series started with a penumbral lunar eclipse on March 11, 993 AD. It contains partial eclipses from June 16, 1155 through September 11, 1299; total eclipses from September 21, 1317 through July 11, 1786; and a second set of partial eclipses from July 22, 1804 through October 7, 1930. The series ends at member 73 as a penumbral eclipse on May 14, 2291.

The longest duration of totality was produced by member 40 at 102 minutes, 40 seconds on May 16, 1696. All eclipses in this series occur at the Moon’s ascending node of orbit.

Greatest	First			
The greatest eclipse of the series occurred on 1696 May 16, lasting 102 minutes, 40 seconds.	Penumbral	Partial	Total	Central
The greatest eclipse of the series occurred on 1696 May 16, lasting 102 minutes, 40 seconds.	993 Mar 11	1155 Jun 16	1317 Sep 21	1588 Mar 13
The greatest eclipse of the series occurred on 1696 May 16, lasting 102 minutes, 40 seconds.	Last			
The greatest eclipse of the series occurred on 1696 May 16, lasting 102 minutes, 40 seconds.	Central	Total	Partial	Penumbral
The greatest eclipse of the series occurred on 1696 May 16, lasting 102 minutes, 40 seconds.	1750 Jun 19	1786 Jul 11	1930 Oct 07	2291 May 14

Eclipses are tabulated in three columns; every third eclipse in the same column is one exeligmos apart, so they all cast shadows over approximately the same parts of the Earth.

Series members 46–67 occur between 1801 and 2200:
46	47	48
1804 Jul 22	1822 Aug 03	1840 Aug 13
49	50	51
1858 Aug 24	1876 Sep 03	1894 Sep 15
52	53	54
1912 Sep 26	1930 Oct 07	1948 Oct 18
55	56	57
1966 Oct 29	1984 Nov 08	2002 Nov 20
58	59	60
2020 Nov 30	2038 Dec 11	2056 Dec 22
61	62	63
2075 Jan 02	2093 Jan 12	2111 Jan 25
64	65	66
2129 Feb 04	2147 Feb 15	2165 Feb 26
67
2183 Mar 09

=== Tritos series ===
This eclipse is a part of a tritos cycle, repeating at alternating nodes every 135 synodic months (≈ 3986.63 days, or 11 years minus 1 month). Their appearance and longitude are irregular due to a lack of synchronization with the anomalistic month (period of perigee), but groupings of 3 tritos cycles (≈ 33 years minus 3 months) come close (≈ 434.044 anomalistic months), so eclipses are similar in these groupings.

Series members between 1817 and 2200
1817 May 01 (Saros 99)	1828 Mar 31 (Saros 100)	1839 Feb 28 (Saros 101)	1850 Jan 28 (Saros 102)	1860 Dec 28 (Saros 103)
		1893 Sep 25 (Saros 106)		1915 Jul 26 (Saros 108)
1926 Jun 25 (Saros 109)	1937 May 25 (Saros 110)	1948 Apr 23 (Saros 111)	1959 Mar 24 (Saros 112)	1970 Feb 21 (Saros 113)
1981 Jan 20 (Saros 114)	1991 Dec 21 (Saros 115)	2002 Nov 20 (Saros 116)	2013 Oct 18 (Saros 117)	2024 Sep 18 (Saros 118)
2035 Aug 19 (Saros 119)	2046 Jul 18 (Saros 120)	2057 Jun 17 (Saros 121)	2068 May 17 (Saros 122)	2079 Apr 16 (Saros 123)
2090 Mar 15 (Saros 124)	2101 Feb 14 (Saros 125)	2112 Jan 14 (Saros 126)	2122 Dec 13 (Saros 127)	2133 Nov 12 (Saros 128)
2144 Oct 11 (Saros 129)	2155 Sep 11 (Saros 130)	2166 Aug 11 (Saros 131)	2177 Jul 11 (Saros 132)	2188 Jun 09 (Saros 133)
2199 May 10 (Saros 134)

=== Inex series ===
This eclipse is a part of the long period inex cycle, repeating at alternating nodes, every 358 synodic months (≈ 10,571.95 days, or 29 years minus 20 days). Their appearance and longitude are irregular due to a lack of synchronization with the anomalistic month (period of perigee). However, groupings of 3 inex cycles (≈ 87 years minus 2 months) comes close (≈ 1,151.02 anomalistic months), so eclipses are similar in these groupings.

Series members between 1801 and 2200
1829 Mar 20 (Saros 110)	1858 Feb 27 (Saros 111)	1887 Feb 08 (Saros 112)
1916 Jan 20 (Saros 113)	1944 Dec 29 (Saros 114)	1973 Dec 10 (Saros 115)
2002 Nov 20 (Saros 116)	2031 Oct 30 (Saros 117)	2060 Oct 09 (Saros 118)
2089 Sep 19 (Saros 119)	2118 Aug 31 (Saros 120)	2147 Aug 11 (Saros 121)
2176 Jul 21 (Saros 122)

=== Half-Saros cycle ===
A lunar eclipse will be preceded and followed by solar eclipses by 9 years and 5.5 days (a half saros). This lunar eclipse is related to two partial solar eclipses of Solar Saros 123.

November 13, 1993	November 25, 2011

== See also ==
- List of lunar eclipses
- List of 21st-century lunar eclipses
