= October 2031 lunar eclipse =

Astronomical event

- Penumbral eclipse
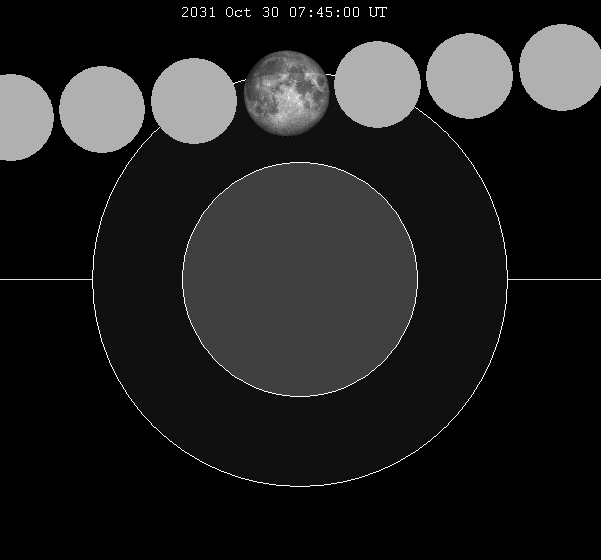
- The Moon's hourly motion shown right to left
- Date: October 30, 2031
- Gamma: 1.1774
- Magnitude: −0.3193
- Saros cycle: 117 (53 of 72)
- Penumbral: 231 minutes, 45 seconds
Contacts (UTC)
- P1: 5:49:29
- Greatest: 7:46:45
- P4: 9:41:15

A penumbral lunar eclipse will occur at the Moon’s descending node of orbit on Thursday, October 30, 2031, with an umbral magnitude of −0.3193. A lunar eclipse occurs when the Moon moves into the Earth's shadow, causing the Moon to be darkened. A penumbral lunar eclipse occurs when part or all of the Moon's near side passes into the Earth's penumbra. Unlike a solar eclipse, which can only be viewed from a relatively small area of the world, a lunar eclipse may be viewed from anywhere on the night side of Earth. The Moon's apparent diameter will be near the average diameter because it will occur 7.6 days after perigee (on October 22, 2031, at 16:20 UTC) and 6.6 days before apogee (on November 5, 2031, at 21:45 UTC).

== Visibility ==
The eclipse will be completely visible over North America, western South America, and the eastern Pacific Ocean, seen rising over eastern Australia and northeast Asia and setting over eastern South America, west Africa, and western Europe.

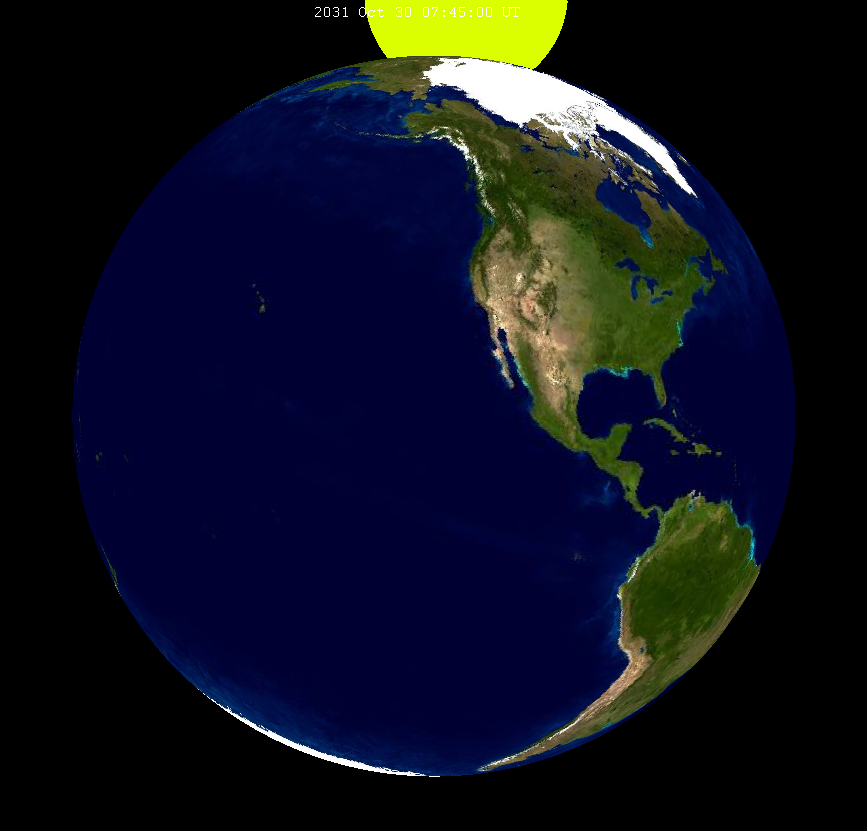
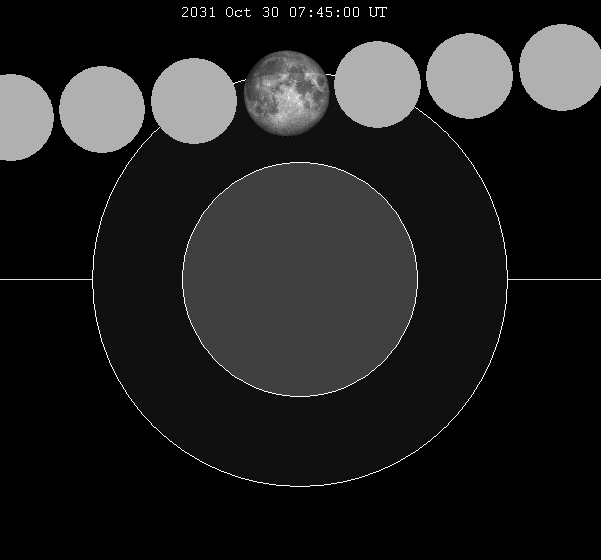

== Eclipse details ==
Shown below is a table displaying details about this particular solar eclipse. It describes various parameters pertaining to this eclipse.

October 30, 2031 Lunar Eclipse Parameters
Parameter	Value
Penumbral Magnitude	0.71726
Umbral Magnitude	−0.31925
Gamma	1.17738
Sun Right Ascension	14h17m25.0s
Sun Declination	-13°44'38.7"
Sun Semi-Diameter	16'06.3"
Sun Equatorial Horizontal Parallax	08.9"
Moon Right Ascension	02h16m19.7s
Moon Declination	+14°49'53.3"
Moon Semi-Diameter	15'32.2"
Moon Equatorial Horizontal Parallax	0°57'01.3"
ΔT	74.8 s

== Eclipse season ==
This eclipse is part of an eclipse season, a period, roughly every six months, when eclipses occur. Only two (or occasionally three) eclipse seasons occur each year, and each season lasts about 35 days and repeats just short of six months (173 days) later; thus two full eclipse seasons always occur each year. Either two or three eclipses happen each eclipse season. In the sequence below, each eclipse is separated by a fortnight.

Eclipse season of October–November 2031
October 30 Descending node (full moon)	November 14 Ascending node (new moon)
Penumbral lunar eclipse Lunar Saros 117	Hybrid solar eclipse Solar Saros 143

== Related eclipses ==
=== Eclipses in 2031 ===
- A penumbral lunar eclipse on May 7.
- An annular solar eclipse on May 21.
- A penumbral lunar eclipse on June 5.
- A penumbral lunar eclipse on October 30.
- A hybrid solar eclipse on November 14.

=== Metonic ===
- Preceded by: Lunar eclipse of January 12, 2028
- Followed by: Lunar eclipse of August 19, 2035

=== Tzolkinex ===
- Preceded by: Lunar eclipse of September 18, 2024
- Followed by: Lunar eclipse of December 11, 2038

=== Half-Saros ===
- Preceded by: Solar eclipse of October 25, 2022
- Followed by: Solar eclipse of November 4, 2040

=== Tritos ===
- Preceded by: Lunar eclipse of November 30, 2020
- Followed by: Lunar eclipse of September 29, 2042

=== Lunar Saros 117 ===
- Preceded by: Lunar eclipse of October 18, 2013
- Followed by: Lunar eclipse of November 9, 2049

=== Inex ===
- Preceded by: Lunar eclipse of November 20, 2002
- Followed by: Lunar eclipse of October 9, 2060

=== Triad ===
- Preceded by: Lunar eclipse of December 29, 1944
- Followed by: Lunar eclipse of August 31, 2118

=== Lunar eclipses of 2031–2034 ===
This eclipse is a member of a semester series. An eclipse in a semester series of lunar eclipses repeats approximately every 177 days and 4 hours (a semester) at alternating nodes of the Moon's orbit.

The penumbral lunar eclipse on June 5, 2031 occurs in the previous lunar year eclipse set.

Lunar eclipse series sets from 2031 to 2034
Ascending node				Descending node			
Saros	Date Viewing	Type Chart	Gamma	Saros	Date Viewing	Type Chart	Gamma
112	2031 May 07	Penumbral	−1.0694	117	2031 Oct 30	Penumbral	1.1774
122	2032 Apr 25	Total	−0.3558	127	2032 Oct 18	Total	0.4169
132	2033 Apr 14	Total	0.3954	137	2033 Oct 08	Total	−0.2889
142	2034 Apr 03	Penumbral	1.1144	147	2034 Sep 28	Partial	−1.0110

=== Saros 117 ===
This eclipse is a part of Saros series 117, repeating every 18 years, 11 days, and containing 71 events. The series started with a penumbral lunar eclipse on April 3, 1094. It contains partial eclipses from June 29, 1238 through September 23, 1382; total eclipses from October 3, 1400 through June 21, 1815; and a second set of partial eclipses from July 2, 1833 through September 5, 1941. The series ends at member 71 as a penumbral eclipse on May 15, 2356.

The longest duration of totality was produced by member 35 at 105 minutes, 43 seconds on April 17, 1707. All eclipses in this series occur at the Moon’s descending node of orbit.

Greatest	First			
The greatest eclipse of the series occurred on 1707 Apr 17, lasting 105 minutes, 43 seconds.	Penumbral	Partial	Total	Central
The greatest eclipse of the series occurred on 1707 Apr 17, lasting 105 minutes, 43 seconds.	1094 Apr 03	1238 Jun 29	1400 Oct 03	1563 Jan 09
The greatest eclipse of the series occurred on 1707 Apr 17, lasting 105 minutes, 43 seconds.	Last			
The greatest eclipse of the series occurred on 1707 Apr 17, lasting 105 minutes, 43 seconds.	Central	Total	Partial	Penumbral
The greatest eclipse of the series occurred on 1707 Apr 17, lasting 105 minutes, 43 seconds.	1761 May 18	1815 Jun 21	1941 Sep 05	2356 May 15

Eclipses are tabulated in three columns; every third eclipse in the same column is one exeligmos apart, so they all cast shadows over approximately the same parts of the Earth.

Series members 41–62 occur between 1801 and 2200:
41	42	43
1815 Jun 21	1833 Jul 02	1851 Jul 13
44	45	46
1869 Jul 23	1887 Aug 03	1905 Aug 15
47	48	49
1923 Aug 26	1941 Sep 05	1959 Sep 17
50	51	52
1977 Sep 27	1995 Oct 08	2013 Oct 18
53	54	55
2031 Oct 30	2049 Nov 09	2067 Nov 21
56	57	58
2085 Dec 01	2103 Dec 13	2121 Dec 24
59	60	61
2140 Jan 04	2158 Jan 14	2176 Jan 26
62
2194 Feb 05

=== Tritos series ===
This eclipse is a part of a tritos cycle, repeating at alternating nodes every 135 synodic months (≈ 3986.63 days, or 11 years minus 1 month). Their appearance and longitude are irregular due to a lack of synchronization with the anomalistic month (period of perigee), but groupings of 3 tritos cycles (≈ 33 years minus 3 months) come close (≈ 434.044 anomalistic months), so eclipses are similar in these groupings.

Series members between 1835 and 2200
1835 May 12 (Saros 99)	1846 Apr 11 (Saros 100)		1868 Feb 08 (Saros 102)	1879 Jan 08 (Saros 103)
				1933 Aug 05 (Saros 108)
1944 Jul 06 (Saros 109)	1955 Jun 05 (Saros 110)	1966 May 04 (Saros 111)	1977 Apr 04 (Saros 112)	1988 Mar 03 (Saros 113)
1999 Jan 31 (Saros 114)	2009 Dec 31 (Saros 115)	2020 Nov 30 (Saros 116)	2031 Oct 30 (Saros 117)	2042 Sep 29 (Saros 118)
2053 Aug 29 (Saros 119)	2064 Jul 28 (Saros 120)	2075 Jun 28 (Saros 121)	2086 May 28 (Saros 122)	2097 Apr 26 (Saros 123)
2108 Mar 27 (Saros 124)	2119 Feb 25 (Saros 125)	2130 Jan 24 (Saros 126)	2140 Dec 23 (Saros 127)	2151 Nov 24 (Saros 128)
2162 Oct 23 (Saros 129)	2173 Sep 21 (Saros 130)	2184 Aug 21 (Saros 131)	2195 Jul 22 (Saros 132)	

=== Inex series ===
This eclipse is a part of the long period inex cycle, repeating at alternating nodes, every 358 synodic months (≈ 10,571.95 days, or 29 years minus 20 days). Their appearance and longitude are irregular due to a lack of synchronization with the anomalistic month (period of perigee). However, groupings of 3 inex cycles (≈ 87 years minus 2 months) comes close (≈ 1,151.02 anomalistic months), so eclipses are similar in these groupings.

Series members between 1801 and 2200
1829 Mar 20 (Saros 110)	1858 Feb 27 (Saros 111)	1887 Feb 08 (Saros 112)
1916 Jan 20 (Saros 113)	1944 Dec 29 (Saros 114)	1973 Dec 10 (Saros 115)
2002 Nov 20 (Saros 116)	2031 Oct 30 (Saros 117)	2060 Oct 09 (Saros 118)
2089 Sep 19 (Saros 119)	2118 Aug 31 (Saros 120)	2147 Aug 11 (Saros 121)
2176 Jul 21 (Saros 122)

=== Half-Saros cycle ===
A lunar eclipse will be preceded and followed by solar eclipses by 9 years and 5.5 days (a half saros). This lunar eclipse is related to two partial solar eclipses of Solar Saros 124.

October 25, 2022	November 4, 2040

== See also ==
- List of lunar eclipses and List of 21st-century lunar eclipses
