= October 1966 lunar eclipse =

Penumbral lunar eclipse October 29, 1966

- Penumbral eclipse
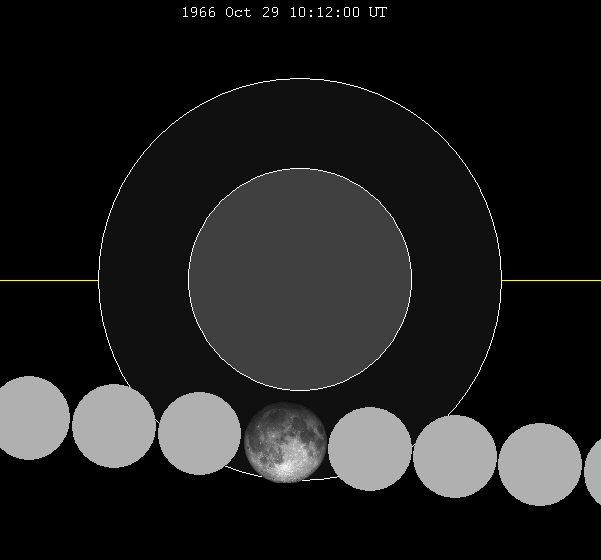
- The Moon's hourly motion shown right to left
- Date: October 29, 1966
- Gamma: −1.0600
- Magnitude: −0.1249
- Saros cycle: 116 (55 of 73)
- Penumbral: 273 minutes, 41 seconds
Contacts (UTC)
- P1: 7:55:27
- Greatest: 10:12:16
- P4: 12:29:08

A penumbral lunar eclipse occurred at the Moon’s ascending node of orbit on Saturday, October 29, 1966, with an umbral magnitude of −0.1249. A lunar eclipse occurs when the Moon moves into the Earth's shadow, causing the Moon to be darkened. A penumbral lunar eclipse occurs when part or all of the Moon's near side passes into the Earth's penumbra. Unlike a solar eclipse, which can only be viewed from a relatively small area of the world, a lunar eclipse may be viewed from anywhere on the night side of Earth. Occurring about 4 days after apogee (on October 25, 1966, at 9:55 UTC), the Moon's apparent diameter was smaller.

== Visibility ==
The eclipse was completely visible over northeast Asia, much of North America, and the Pacific Ocean, seen rising over east and southeast Asia and Australia and setting over eastern North America and South America.

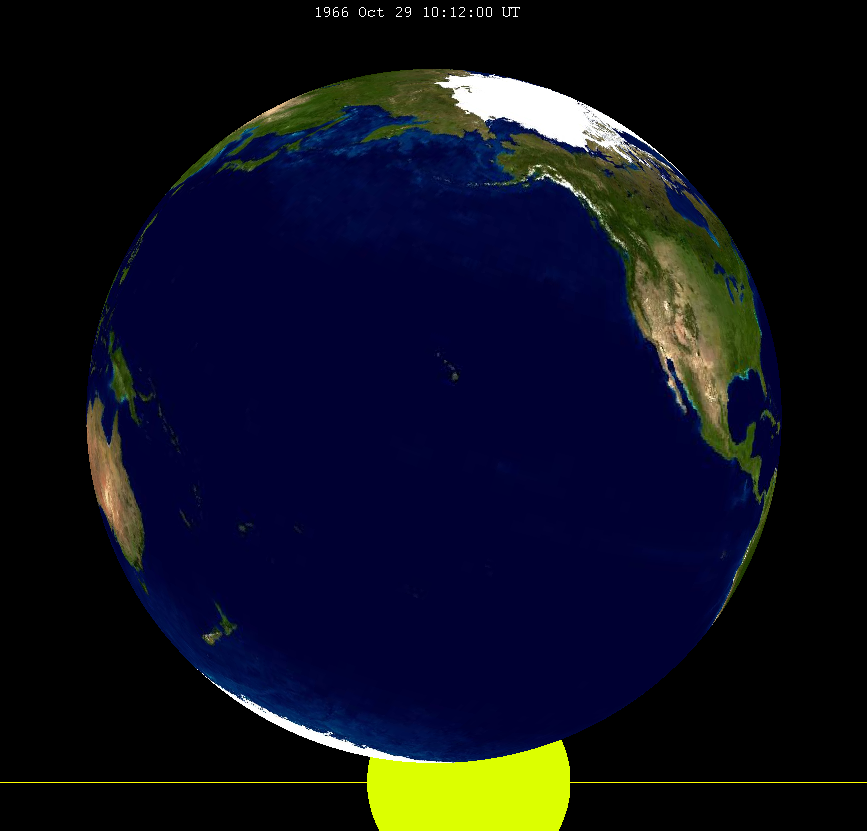
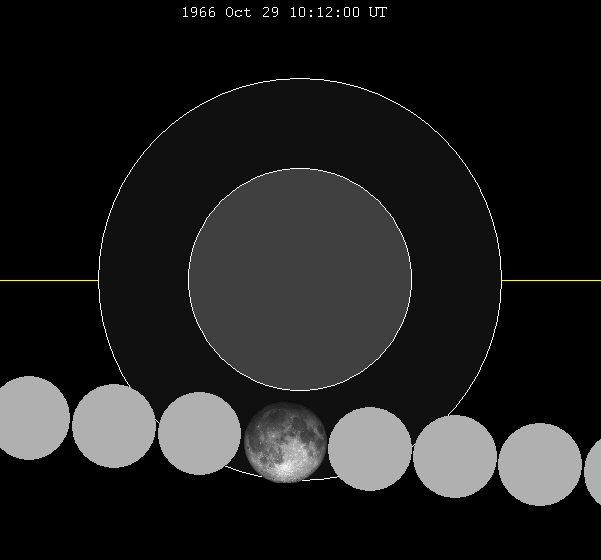

== Eclipse details ==
Shown below is a table displaying details about this particular solar eclipse. It describes various parameters pertaining to this eclipse.

October 29, 1966 Lunar Eclipse Parameters
Parameter	Value
Penumbral Magnitude	0.95172
Umbral Magnitude	−0.12488
Gamma	−1.05999
Sun Right Ascension	14h12m57.7s
Sun Declination	-13°22'20.9"
Sun Semi-Diameter	16'06.2"
Sun Equatorial Horizontal Parallax	08.9"
Moon Right Ascension	02h14m38.8s
Moon Declination	+12°29'37.7"
Moon Semi-Diameter	14'57.5"
Moon Equatorial Horizontal Parallax	0°54'53.8"
ΔT	37.2 s

== Eclipse season ==
This eclipse is part of an eclipse season, a period, roughly every six months, when eclipses occur. Only two (or occasionally three) eclipse seasons occur each year, and each season lasts about 35 days and repeats just short of six months (173 days) later; thus two full eclipse seasons always occur each year. Either two or three eclipses happen each eclipse season. In the sequence below, each eclipse is separated by a fortnight.

Eclipse season of October–November 1966
October 29 Ascending node (full moon)	November 12 Descending node (new moon)
Penumbral lunar eclipse Lunar Saros 116	Total solar eclipse Solar Saros 142

== Related eclipses ==
=== Eclipses in 1966 ===
- A penumbral lunar eclipse on May 4.
- An annular solar eclipse on May 20.
- A penumbral lunar eclipse on October 29.
- A total solar eclipse on November 12.

=== Metonic ===
- Preceded by: Lunar eclipse of January 9, 1963
- Followed by: Lunar eclipse of August 17, 1970

=== Tzolkinex ===
- Preceded by: Lunar eclipse of September 17, 1959
- Followed by: Lunar eclipse of December 10, 1973

=== Half-Saros ===
- Preceded by: Solar eclipse of October 23, 1957
- Followed by: Solar eclipse of November 3, 1975

=== Tritos ===
- Preceded by: Lunar eclipse of November 29, 1955
- Followed by: Lunar eclipse of September 27, 1977

=== Lunar Saros 116 ===
- Preceded by: Lunar eclipse of October 18, 1948
- Followed by: Lunar eclipse of November 8, 1984

=== Inex ===
- Preceded by: Lunar eclipse of November 18, 1937
- Followed by: Lunar eclipse of October 8, 1995

=== Triad ===
- Preceded by: Lunar eclipse of December 28, 1879
- Followed by: Lunar eclipse of August 29, 2053

=== Lunar eclipses of 1966–1969 ===
This eclipse is a member of a semester series. An eclipse in a semester series of lunar eclipses repeats approximately every 177 days and 4 hours (a semester) at alternating nodes of the Moon's orbit.

The penumbral lunar eclipse on August 27, 1969 occurs in the next lunar year eclipse set.

Lunar eclipse series sets from 1966 to 1969
Descending node				Ascending node			
Saros	Date Viewing	Type Chart	Gamma	Saros	Date Viewing	Type Chart	Gamma
111	1966 May 04	Penumbral	1.0554	116	1966 Oct 29	Penumbral	−1.0600
121	1967 Apr 24	Total	0.2972	126	1967 Oct 18	Total	−0.3653
131	1968 Apr 13	Total	−0.4173	136	1968 Oct 06	Total	0.3605
141	1969 Apr 02	Penumbral	−1.1765	146	1969 Sep 25	Penumbral	1.0656

=== Metonic series ===
The metonic cycle repeats nearly exactly every 19 years and represents a Saros cycle plus one lunar year. Because it occurs on the same calendar date, the Earth's shadow will in nearly the same location relative to the background stars.

Metonic events: May 4 and October 28
Descending node	Ascending node
1. 1966 May 4 - Penumbral (111); 2. 1985 May 4 - Total (121); 3. 2004 May 4 - Total (131); 4. 2023 May 5 - Penumbral (141)	1. 1966 Oct 29 - Penumbral (116); 2. 1985 Oct 28 - Total (126); 3. 2004 Oct 28 - Total (136); 4. 2023 Oct 28 - Partial (146); 5. 2042 Oct 28 - Penumbral (156)

=== Saros 116 ===
This eclipse is a part of Saros series 116, repeating every 18 years, 11 days, and containing 73 events. The series started with a penumbral lunar eclipse on March 11, 993 AD. It contains partial eclipses from June 16, 1155 through September 11, 1299; total eclipses from September 21, 1317 through July 11, 1786; and a second set of partial eclipses from July 22, 1804 through October 7, 1930. The series ends at member 73 as a penumbral eclipse on May 14, 2291.

The longest duration of totality was produced by member 40 at 102 minutes, 40 seconds on May 16, 1696. All eclipses in this series occur at the Moon’s ascending node of orbit.

Greatest	First			
The greatest eclipse of the series occurred on 1696 May 16, lasting 102 minutes, 40 seconds.	Penumbral	Partial	Total	Central
The greatest eclipse of the series occurred on 1696 May 16, lasting 102 minutes, 40 seconds.	993 Mar 11	1155 Jun 16	1317 Sep 21	1588 Mar 13
The greatest eclipse of the series occurred on 1696 May 16, lasting 102 minutes, 40 seconds.	Last			
The greatest eclipse of the series occurred on 1696 May 16, lasting 102 minutes, 40 seconds.	Central	Total	Partial	Penumbral
The greatest eclipse of the series occurred on 1696 May 16, lasting 102 minutes, 40 seconds.	1750 Jun 19	1786 Jul 11	1930 Oct 07	2291 May 14

Eclipses are tabulated in three columns; every third eclipse in the same column is one exeligmos apart, so they all cast shadows over approximately the same parts of the Earth.

Series members 46–67 occur between 1801 and 2200:
46	47	48
1804 Jul 22	1822 Aug 03	1840 Aug 13
49	50	51
1858 Aug 24	1876 Sep 03	1894 Sep 15
52	53	54
1912 Sep 26	1930 Oct 07	1948 Oct 18
55	56	57
1966 Oct 29	1984 Nov 08	2002 Nov 20
58	59	60
2020 Nov 30	2038 Dec 11	2056 Dec 22
61	62	63
2075 Jan 02	2093 Jan 12	2111 Jan 25
64	65	66
2129 Feb 04	2147 Feb 15	2165 Feb 26
67
2183 Mar 09

=== Tritos series ===
This eclipse is a part of a tritos cycle, repeating at alternating nodes every 135 synodic months (≈ 3986.63 days, or 11 years minus 1 month). Their appearance and longitude are irregular due to a lack of synchronization with the anomalistic month (period of perigee), but groupings of 3 tritos cycles (≈ 33 years minus 3 months) come close (≈ 434.044 anomalistic months), so eclipses are similar in these groupings.

Series members between 1801 and 2200
1803 Feb 06 (Saros 101)	1814 Jan 06 (Saros 102)	1824 Dec 06 (Saros 103)		1846 Oct 04 (Saros 105)
1857 Sep 04 (Saros 106)	1868 Aug 03 (Saros 107)	1879 Jul 03 (Saros 108)	1890 Jun 03 (Saros 109)	1901 May 03 (Saros 110)
1912 Apr 01 (Saros 111)	1923 Mar 03 (Saros 112)	1934 Jan 30 (Saros 113)	1944 Dec 29 (Saros 114)	1955 Nov 29 (Saros 115)
1966 Oct 29 (Saros 116)	1977 Sep 27 (Saros 117)	1988 Aug 27 (Saros 118)	1999 Jul 28 (Saros 119)	2010 Jun 26 (Saros 120)
2021 May 26 (Saros 121)	2032 Apr 25 (Saros 122)	2043 Mar 25 (Saros 123)	2054 Feb 22 (Saros 124)	2065 Jan 22 (Saros 125)
2075 Dec 22 (Saros 126)	2086 Nov 20 (Saros 127)	2097 Oct 21 (Saros 128)	2108 Sep 20 (Saros 129)	2119 Aug 20 (Saros 130)
2130 Jul 21 (Saros 131)	2141 Jun 19 (Saros 132)	2152 May 18 (Saros 133)	2163 Apr 19 (Saros 134)	2174 Mar 18 (Saros 135)
2185 Feb 14 (Saros 136)	2196 Jan 15 (Saros 137)			

=== Inex series ===
This eclipse is a part of the long period inex cycle, repeating at alternating nodes, every 358 synodic months (≈ 10,571.95 days, or 29 years minus 20 days). Their appearance and longitude are irregular due to a lack of synchronization with the anomalistic month (period of perigee). However, groupings of 3 inex cycles (≈ 87 years minus 2 months) comes close (≈ 1,151.02 anomalistic months), so eclipses are similar in these groupings.

Series members between 1801 and 2200
1822 Feb 06 (Saros 111)	1851 Jan 17 (Saros 112)	1879 Dec 28 (Saros 113)
1908 Dec 07 (Saros 114)	1937 Nov 18 (Saros 115)	1966 Oct 29 (Saros 116)
1995 Oct 08 (Saros 117)	2024 Sep 18 (Saros 118)	2053 Aug 29 (Saros 119)
2082 Aug 08 (Saros 120)	2111 Jul 21 (Saros 121)	2140 Jun 30 (Saros 122)
2169 Jun 09 (Saros 123)	2198 May 20 (Saros 124)	

=== Half-Saros cycle ===
A lunar eclipse will be preceded and followed by solar eclipses by 9 years and 5.5 days (a half saros). This lunar eclipse is related to two solar eclipses of Solar Saros 123.

October 23, 1957	November 3, 1975

== See also ==
- List of lunar eclipses
- List of 20th-century lunar eclipses
