= December 2038 lunar eclipse =

Penumbral

- Penumbral eclipse
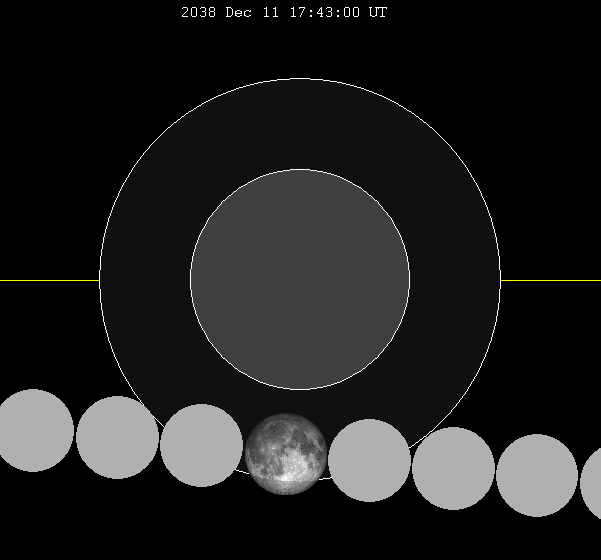
- The Moon's hourly motion shown right to left
- Date: December 11, 2038
- Gamma: −1.1448
- Magnitude: −0.2876
- Saros cycle: 116 (59 of 73)
- Penumbral: 258 minutes, 27 seconds
Contacts (UTC)
- P1: 15:34:24
- Greatest: 17:45:00
- P4: 19:52:51

A penumbral lunar eclipse will occur at the Moon’s ascending node of orbit on Saturday, December 11, 2038, with an umbral magnitude of −0.2876. A lunar eclipse occurs when the Moon moves into the Earth's shadow, causing the Moon to be darkened. A penumbral lunar eclipse occurs when part or all of the Moon's near side passes into the Earth's penumbra. Unlike a solar eclipse, which can only be viewed from a relatively small area of the world, a lunar eclipse may be viewed from anywhere on the night side of Earth. Occurring about 3.3 days after apogee (on December 8, 2038, at 8:35 UTC), the Moon's apparent diameter will be smaller.

This eclipse will be the last of four penumbral lunar eclipses in 2038, with the others occurring on January 21, June 17, and July 16.

== Visibility ==
The eclipse will be completely visible over northeast Africa, Europe, Asia, and Australia, seen rising over west and central Africa and setting over the central Pacific Ocean.

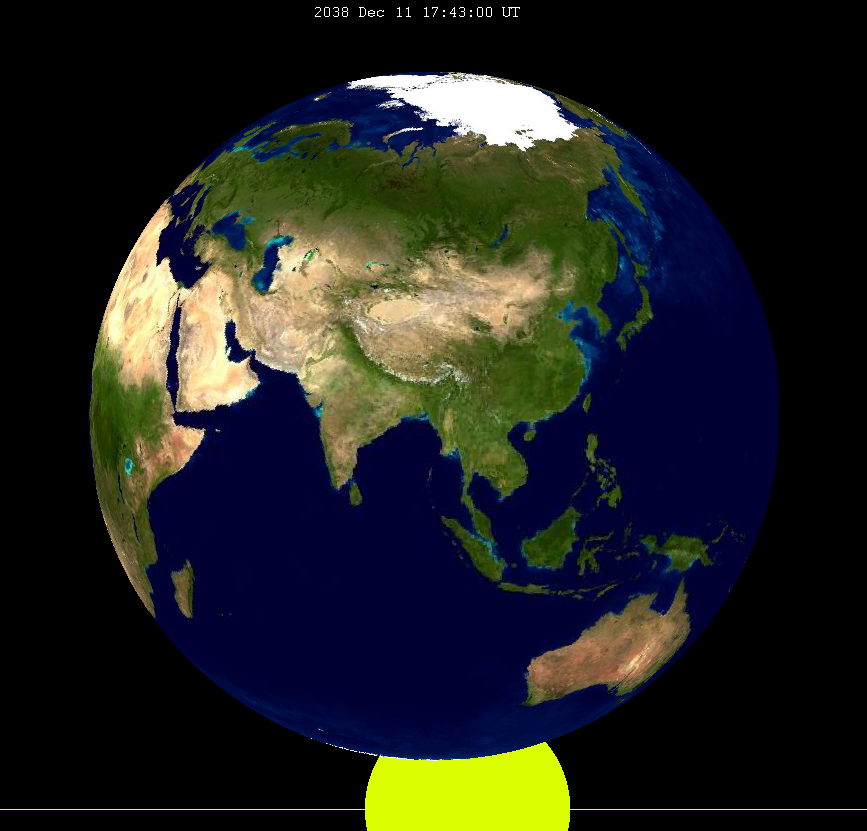
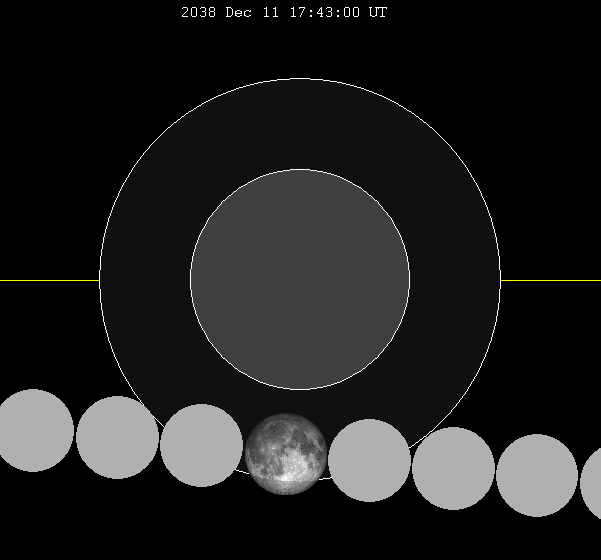

== Eclipse details ==
Shown below is a table displaying details about this particular solar eclipse. It describes various parameters pertaining to this eclipse.

December 11, 2038 Lunar Eclipse Parameters
Parameter	Value
Penumbral Magnitude	0.80623
Umbral Magnitude	−0.28760
Gamma	−1.14490
Sun Right Ascension	17h15m29.9s
Sun Declination	-23°02'24.2"
Sun Semi-Diameter	16'14.6"
Sun Equatorial Horizontal Parallax	08.9"
Moon Right Ascension	05h16m16.9s
Moon Declination	+22°00'57.8"
Moon Semi-Diameter	14'51.0"
Moon Equatorial Horizontal Parallax	0°54'29.8"
ΔT	78.5 s

== Eclipse season ==
This eclipse is part of an eclipse season, a period, roughly every six months, when eclipses occur. Only two (or occasionally three) eclipse seasons occur each year, and each season lasts about 35 days and repeats just short of six months (173 days) later; thus two full eclipse seasons always occur each year. Either two or three eclipses happen each eclipse season. In the sequence below, each eclipse is separated by a fortnight.

Eclipse season of December 2038
December 11 Ascending node (full moon)	December 26 Descending node (new moon)
Penumbral lunar eclipse Lunar Saros 116	Total solar eclipse Solar Saros 142

== Related eclipses ==
=== Eclipses in 2038 ===
- An annular solar eclipse on January 5.
- A penumbral lunar eclipse on January 21.
- A penumbral lunar eclipse on June 17.
- An annular solar eclipse on July 2.
- A penumbral lunar eclipse on July 16.
- A penumbral lunar eclipse on December 11.
- A total solar eclipse on December 26.

=== Metonic ===
- Preceded by: Lunar eclipse of February 22, 2035
- Followed by: Lunar eclipse of September 29, 2042

=== Tzolkinex ===
- Preceded by: Lunar eclipse of October 30, 2031
- Followed by: Lunar eclipse of January 22, 2046

=== Half-Saros ===
- Preceded by: Solar eclipse of December 5, 2029
- Followed by: Solar eclipse of December 16, 2047

=== Tritos ===
- Preceded by: Lunar eclipse of January 12, 2028
- Followed by: Lunar eclipse of November 9, 2049

=== Lunar Saros 116 ===
- Preceded by: Lunar eclipse of November 30, 2020
- Followed by: Lunar eclipse of December 22, 2056

=== Inex ===
- Preceded by: Lunar eclipse of December 31, 2009
- Followed by: Lunar eclipse of November 21, 2067

=== Triad ===
- Preceded by: Lunar eclipse of February 11, 1952
- Followed by: Lunar eclipse of October 12, 2125

=== Lunar eclipses of 2038–2042 ===
This eclipse is a member of a semester series. An eclipse in a semester series of lunar eclipses repeats approximately every 177 days and 4 hours (a semester) at alternating nodes of the Moon's orbit.

The penumbral lunar eclipses on January 21, 2038 and July 16, 2038 occur in the previous lunar year eclipse set, and the penumbral lunar eclipses on April 5, 2042 and September 29, 2042 occur in the next lunar year eclipse set.

Lunar eclipse series sets from 2038 to 2042
Descending node				Ascending node			
Saros	Date Viewing	Type Chart	Gamma	Saros	Date Viewing	Type Chart	Gamma
111	2038 Jun 17	Penumbral	1.3082	116	2038 Dec 11	Penumbral	−1.1448
121	2039 Jun 06	Partial	0.5460	126	2039 Nov 30	Partial	−0.4721
131	2040 May 26	Total	−0.1872	136	2040 Nov 18	Total	0.2361
141	2041 May 16	Partial	−0.9746	146	2041 Nov 08	Partial	0.9212
				156	2042 Oct 28	Penumbral	−

=== Saros 116 ===
This eclipse is a part of Saros series 116, repeating every 18 years, 11 days, and containing 73 events. The series started with a penumbral lunar eclipse on March 11, 993 AD. It contains partial eclipses from June 16, 1155 through September 11, 1299; total eclipses from September 21, 1317 through July 11, 1786; and a second set of partial eclipses from July 22, 1804 through October 7, 1930. The series ends at member 73 as a penumbral eclipse on May 14, 2291.

The longest duration of totality was produced by member 40 at 102 minutes, 40 seconds on May 16, 1696. All eclipses in this series occur at the Moon’s ascending node of orbit.

Greatest	First			
The greatest eclipse of the series occurred on 1696 May 16, lasting 102 minutes, 40 seconds.	Penumbral	Partial	Total	Central
The greatest eclipse of the series occurred on 1696 May 16, lasting 102 minutes, 40 seconds.	993 Mar 11	1155 Jun 16	1317 Sep 21	1588 Mar 13
The greatest eclipse of the series occurred on 1696 May 16, lasting 102 minutes, 40 seconds.	Last			
The greatest eclipse of the series occurred on 1696 May 16, lasting 102 minutes, 40 seconds.	Central	Total	Partial	Penumbral
The greatest eclipse of the series occurred on 1696 May 16, lasting 102 minutes, 40 seconds.	1750 Jun 19	1786 Jul 11	1930 Oct 07	2291 May 14

Eclipses are tabulated in three columns; every third eclipse in the same column is one exeligmos apart, so they all cast shadows over approximately the same parts of the Earth.

Series members 46–67 occur between 1801 and 2200:
46	47	48
1804 Jul 22	1822 Aug 03	1840 Aug 13
49	50	51
1858 Aug 24	1876 Sep 03	1894 Sep 15
52	53	54
1912 Sep 26	1930 Oct 07	1948 Oct 18
55	56	57
1966 Oct 29	1984 Nov 08	2002 Nov 20
58	59	60
2020 Nov 30	2038 Dec 11	2056 Dec 22
61	62	63
2075 Jan 02	2093 Jan 12	2111 Jan 25
64	65	66
2129 Feb 04	2147 Feb 15	2165 Feb 26
67
2183 Mar 09

=== Tritos series ===
This eclipse is a part of a tritos cycle, repeating at alternating nodes every 135 synodic months (≈ 3986.63 days, or 11 years minus 1 month). Their appearance and longitude are irregular due to a lack of synchronization with the anomalistic month (period of perigee), but groupings of 3 tritos cycles (≈ 33 years minus 3 months) come close (≈ 434.044 anomalistic months), so eclipses are similar in these groupings.

Series members between 1886 and 2200
1886 Feb 18 (Saros 102)	1897 Jan 18 (Saros 103)			
	1951 Aug 17 (Saros 108)	1962 Jul 17 (Saros 109)	1973 Jun 15 (Saros 110)	1984 May 15 (Saros 111)
1995 Apr 15 (Saros 112)	2006 Mar 14 (Saros 113)	2017 Feb 11 (Saros 114)	2028 Jan 12 (Saros 115)	2038 Dec 11 (Saros 116)
2049 Nov 09 (Saros 117)	2060 Oct 09 (Saros 118)	2071 Sep 09 (Saros 119)	2082 Aug 08 (Saros 120)	2093 Jul 08 (Saros 121)
2104 Jun 08 (Saros 122)	2115 May 08 (Saros 123)	2126 Apr 07 (Saros 124)	2137 Mar 07 (Saros 125)	2148 Feb 04 (Saros 126)
2159 Jan 04 (Saros 127)	2169 Dec 04 (Saros 128)	2180 Nov 02 (Saros 129)	2191 Oct 02 (Saros 130)	

=== Inex series ===
This eclipse is a part of the long period inex cycle, repeating at alternating nodes, every 358 synodic months (≈ 10,571.95 days, or 29 years minus 20 days). Their appearance and longitude are irregular due to a lack of synchronization with the anomalistic month (period of perigee). However, groupings of 3 inex cycles (≈ 87 years minus 2 months) comes close (≈ 1,151.02 anomalistic months), so eclipses are similar in these groupings.

Series members between 1801 and 2200
1807 May 21 (Saros 108)	1836 May 01 (Saros 109)	1865 Apr 11 (Saros 110)
1894 Mar 21 (Saros 111)	1923 Mar 03 (Saros 112)	1952 Feb 11 (Saros 113)
1981 Jan 20 (Saros 114)	2009 Dec 31 (Saros 115)	2038 Dec 11 (Saros 116)
2067 Nov 21 (Saros 117)	2096 Oct 31 (Saros 118)	2125 Oct 12 (Saros 119)
2154 Sep 21 (Saros 120)	2183 Sep 02 (Saros 121)	

=== Half-Saros cycle ===
A lunar eclipse will be preceded and followed by solar eclipses by 9 years and 5.5 days (a half saros). This lunar eclipse is related to two total solar eclipses of Solar Saros 123.

December 5, 2029	December 16, 2047

== See also ==
- List of lunar eclipses and List of 21st-century lunar eclipses
