= October 1948 lunar eclipse =

Penumbral lunar eclipse October 18, 1948

- Penumbral eclipse
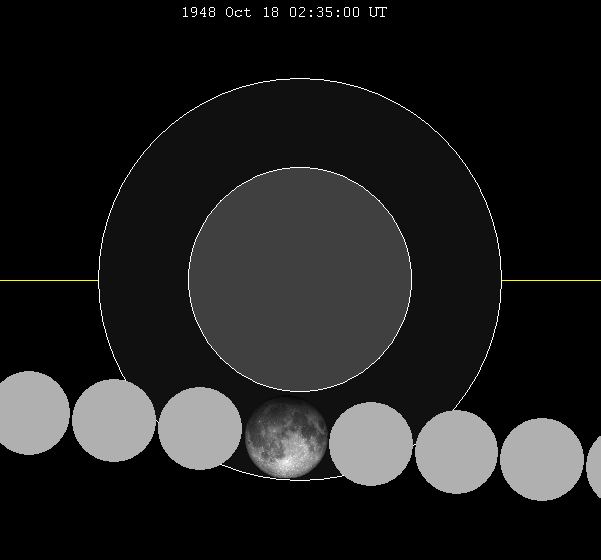
- The Moon's hourly motion shown right to left
- Date: October 18, 1948
- Gamma: −1.0245
- Magnitude: −0.0571
- Saros cycle: 116 (54 of 73)
- Penumbral: 279 minutes, 41 seconds
Contacts (UTC)
- P1: 0:15:22
- Greatest: 2:35:12
- P4: 4:55:03

A penumbral lunar eclipse occurred at the Moon’s ascending node of orbit on Monday, October 18, 1948, with an umbral magnitude of −0.0571. It was a relatively rare total penumbral lunar eclipse, with the Moon passing entirely within the penumbral shadow without entering the darker umbral shadow. A lunar eclipse occurs when the Moon moves into the Earth's shadow, causing the Moon to be darkened. A penumbral lunar eclipse occurs when part or all of the Moon's near side passes into the Earth's penumbra. Unlike a solar eclipse, which can only be viewed from a relatively small area of the world, a lunar eclipse may be viewed from anywhere on the night side of Earth. Occurring about 4.2 days after apogee (on October 13, 1948, at 22:15 UTC), the Moon's apparent diameter was smaller.

== Visibility ==
The eclipse was completely visible over eastern North America, South America, west Africa, and western Europe, seen rising over western North America and the eastern Pacific Ocean and setting over east Africa, eastern Europe, and the western half of Asia.

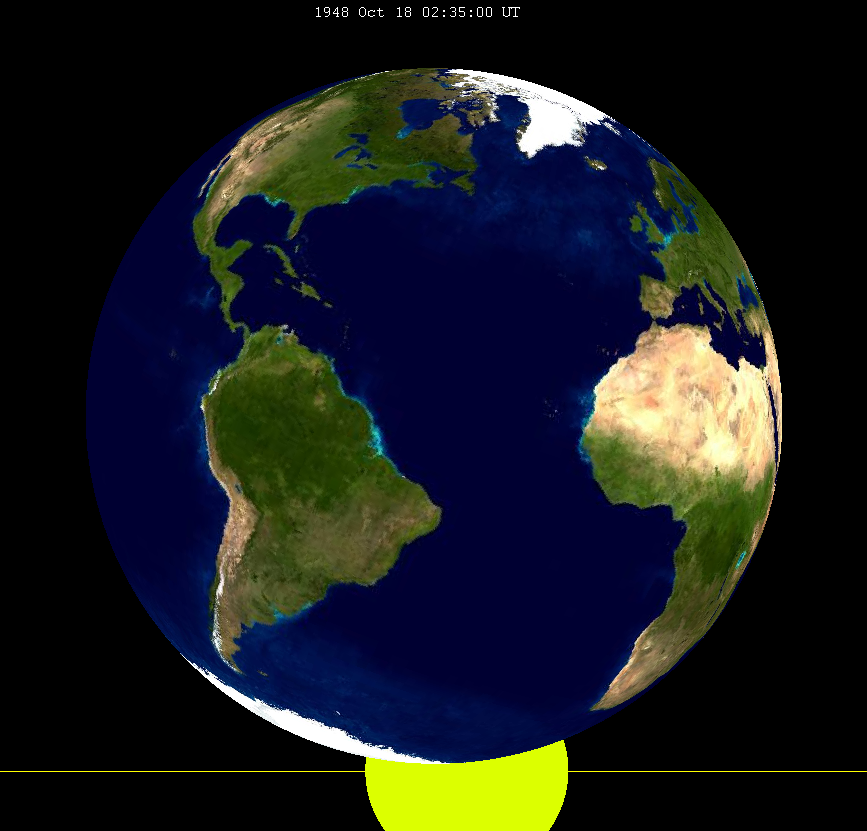
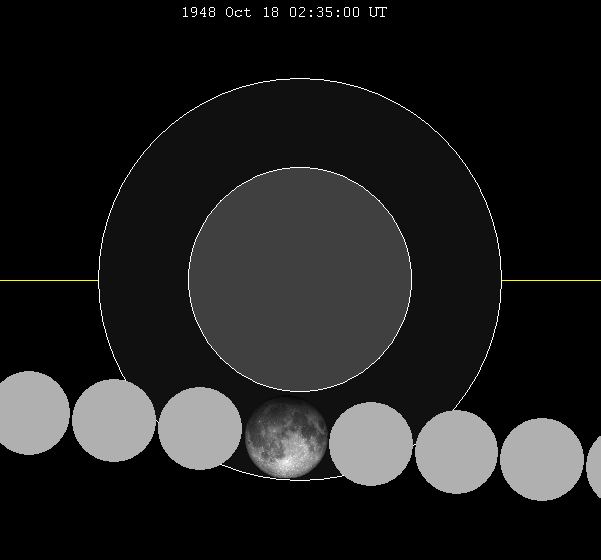

== Eclipse details ==
Shown below is a table displaying details about this particular lunar eclipse. It describes various parameters pertaining to this eclipse.

October 18, 1948 Lunar Eclipse Parameters
Parameter	Value
Penumbral Magnitude	1.01405
Umbral Magnitude	−0.05712
Gamma	−1.02452
Sun Right Ascension	13h31m13.7s
Sun Declination	-09°32'38.5"
Sun Semi-Diameter	16'03.4"
Sun Equatorial Horizontal Parallax	08.8"
Moon Right Ascension	01h32m57.9s
Moon Declination	+08°42'28.9"
Moon Semi-Diameter	14'59.4"
Moon Equatorial Horizontal Parallax	0°55'00.9"
ΔT	28.6 s

== Eclipse season ==
This eclipse is part of an eclipse season, a period, roughly every six months, when eclipses occur. Only two (or occasionally three) eclipse seasons occur each year, and each season lasts about 35 days and repeats just short of six months (173 days) later; thus two full eclipse seasons always occur each year. Either two or three eclipses happen each eclipse season. In the sequence below, each eclipse is separated by a fortnight.

Eclipse season of October–November 1948
October 18 Ascending node (full moon)	November 1 Descending node (new moon)
Penumbral lunar eclipse Lunar Saros 116	Total solar eclipse Solar Saros 142

== Related eclipses ==
=== Eclipses in 1948 ===
- A partial lunar eclipse on April 23.
- An annular solar eclipse on May 9.
- A penumbral lunar eclipse on October 18.
- A total solar eclipse on November 1.

=== Metonic ===
- Preceded by: Lunar eclipse of December 29, 1944
- Followed by: Lunar eclipse of August 5, 1952

=== Tzolkinex ===
- Preceded by: Lunar eclipse of September 5, 1941
- Followed by: Lunar eclipse of November 29, 1955

=== Half-Saros ===
- Preceded by: Solar eclipse of October 12, 1939
- Followed by: Solar eclipse of October 23, 1957

=== Tritos ===
- Preceded by: Lunar eclipse of November 18, 1937
- Followed by: Lunar eclipse of September 17, 1959

=== Lunar Saros 116 ===
- Preceded by: Lunar eclipse of October 7, 1930
- Followed by: Lunar eclipse of October 29, 1966

=== Inex ===
- Preceded by: Lunar eclipse of November 7, 1919
- Followed by: Lunar eclipse of September 27, 1977

=== Triad ===
- Preceded by: Lunar eclipse of December 17, 1861
- Followed by: Lunar eclipse of August 19, 2035

=== Lunar eclipses of 1948–1951 ===
This eclipse is a member of a semester series. An eclipse in a semester series of lunar eclipses repeats approximately every 177 days and 4 hours (a semester) at alternating nodes of the Moon's orbit.

The penumbral lunar eclipses on February 21, 1951 and August 17, 1951 occur in the next lunar year eclipse set.

Lunar eclipse series sets from 1948 to 1951
Descending node				Ascending node			
Saros	Date Viewing	Type Chart	Gamma	Saros	Date Viewing	Type Chart	Gamma
111	1948 Apr 23	Partial	1.0017	116	1948 Oct 18	Penumbral	−1.0245
121	1949 Apr 13	Total	0.2474	126	1949 Oct 07	Total	−0.3219
131	1950 Apr 02	Total	−0.4599	136	1950 Sep 26	Total	0.4101
141	1951 Mar 23	Penumbral	−1.2099	146	1951 Sep 15	Penumbral	1.1187

=== Saros 116 ===
This eclipse is a part of Saros series 116, repeating every 18 years, 11 days, and containing 73 events. The series started with a penumbral lunar eclipse on March 11, 993 AD. It contains partial eclipses from June 16, 1155 through September 11, 1299; total eclipses from September 21, 1317 through July 11, 1786; and a second set of partial eclipses from July 22, 1804 through October 7, 1930. The series ends at member 73 as a penumbral eclipse on May 14, 2291.

The longest duration of totality was produced by member 40 at 102 minutes, 40 seconds on May 16, 1696. All eclipses in this series occur at the Moon’s ascending node of orbit.

Greatest	First			
The greatest eclipse of the series occurred on 1696 May 16, lasting 102 minutes, 40 seconds.	Penumbral	Partial	Total	Central
The greatest eclipse of the series occurred on 1696 May 16, lasting 102 minutes, 40 seconds.	993 Mar 11	1155 Jun 16	1317 Sep 21	1588 Mar 13
The greatest eclipse of the series occurred on 1696 May 16, lasting 102 minutes, 40 seconds.	Last			
The greatest eclipse of the series occurred on 1696 May 16, lasting 102 minutes, 40 seconds.	Central	Total	Partial	Penumbral
The greatest eclipse of the series occurred on 1696 May 16, lasting 102 minutes, 40 seconds.	1750 Jun 19	1786 Jul 11	1930 Oct 07	2291 May 14

Eclipses are tabulated in three columns; every third eclipse in the same column is one exeligmos apart, so they all cast shadows over approximately the same parts of the Earth.

Series members 46–67 occur between 1801 and 2200:
46	47	48
1804 Jul 22	1822 Aug 03	1840 Aug 13
49	50	51
1858 Aug 24	1876 Sep 03	1894 Sep 15
52	53	54
1912 Sep 26	1930 Oct 07	1948 Oct 18
55	56	57
1966 Oct 29	1984 Nov 08	2002 Nov 20
58	59	60
2020 Nov 30	2038 Dec 11	2056 Dec 22
61	62	63
2075 Jan 02	2093 Jan 12	2111 Jan 25
64	65	66
2129 Feb 04	2147 Feb 15	2165 Feb 26
67
2183 Mar 09

=== Tritos series ===
This eclipse is a part of a tritos cycle, repeating at alternating nodes every 135 synodic months (≈ 3986.63 days, or 11 years minus 1 month). Their appearance and longitude are irregular due to a lack of synchronization with the anomalistic month (period of perigee), but groupings of 3 tritos cycles (≈ 33 years minus 3 months) come close (≈ 434.044 anomalistic months), so eclipses are similar in these groupings.

Series members between 1801 and 2200
1806 Nov 26 (Saros 103)		1828 Sep 23 (Saros 105)	1839 Aug 24 (Saros 106)	1850 Jul 24 (Saros 107)
1861 Jun 22 (Saros 108)	1872 May 22 (Saros 109)	1883 Apr 22 (Saros 110)	1894 Mar 21 (Saros 111)	1905 Feb 19 (Saros 112)
1916 Jan 20 (Saros 113)	1926 Dec 19 (Saros 114)	1937 Nov 18 (Saros 115)	1948 Oct 18 (Saros 116)	1959 Sep 17 (Saros 117)
1970 Aug 17 (Saros 118)	1981 Jul 17 (Saros 119)	1992 Jun 15 (Saros 120)	2003 May 16 (Saros 121)	2014 Apr 15 (Saros 122)
2025 Mar 14 (Saros 123)	2036 Feb 11 (Saros 124)	2047 Jan 12 (Saros 125)	2057 Dec 11 (Saros 126)	2068 Nov 09 (Saros 127)
2079 Oct 10 (Saros 128)	2090 Sep 08 (Saros 129)	2101 Aug 09 (Saros 130)	2112 Jul 09 (Saros 131)	2123 Jun 09 (Saros 132)
2134 May 08 (Saros 133)	2145 Apr 07 (Saros 134)	2156 Mar 07 (Saros 135)	2167 Feb 04 (Saros 136)	2178 Jan 04 (Saros 137)
2188 Dec 04 (Saros 138)	2199 Nov 02 (Saros 139)			

=== Inex series ===
This eclipse is a part of the long period inex cycle, repeating at alternating nodes, every 358 synodic months (≈ 10,571.95 days, or 29 years minus 20 days). Their appearance and longitude are irregular due to a lack of synchronization with the anomalistic month (period of perigee). However, groupings of 3 inex cycles (≈ 87 years minus 2 months) comes close (≈ 1,151.02 anomalistic months), so eclipses are similar in these groupings.

Series members between 1801 and 2200
1804 Jan 26 (Saros 111)	1833 Jan 06 (Saros 112)	1861 Dec 17 (Saros 113)
1890 Nov 26 (Saros 114)	1919 Nov 07 (Saros 115)	1948 Oct 18 (Saros 116)
1977 Sep 27 (Saros 117)	2006 Sep 07 (Saros 118)	2035 Aug 19 (Saros 119)
2064 Jul 28 (Saros 120)	2093 Jul 08 (Saros 121)	2122 Jun 20 (Saros 122)
2151 May 30 (Saros 123)	2180 May 09 (Saros 124)	

=== Half-Saros cycle ===
A lunar eclipse will be preceded and followed by solar eclipses by 9 years and 5.5 days (a half saros). This lunar eclipse is related to two total solar eclipses of Solar Saros 123.

October 12, 1939	October 23, 1957

== See also ==
- List of lunar eclipses
- List of 20th-century lunar eclipses
