= November 1984 lunar eclipse =

Penumbral lunar eclipse November 8, 1984

- Penumbral eclipse
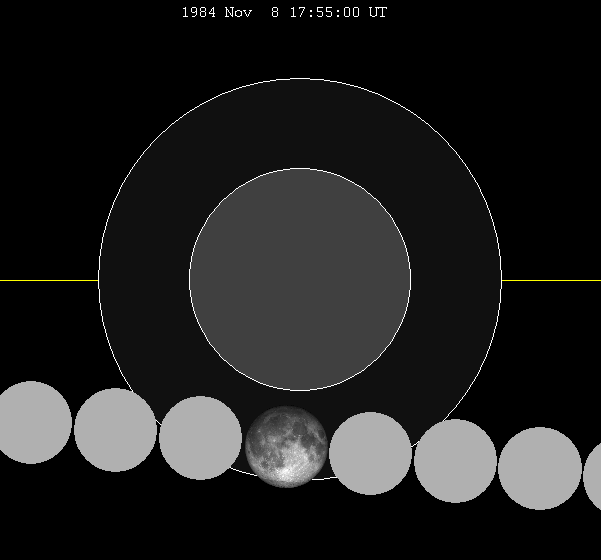
- The Moon's hourly motion shown right to left
- Date: November 8, 1984
- Gamma: −1.0900
- Magnitude: −0.1825
- Saros cycle: 116 (56 of 73)
- Penumbral: 268 minutes, 23 seconds
Contacts (UTC)
- P1: 15:41:04
- Greatest: 17:55:14
- P4: 20:09:27

A penumbral lunar eclipse occurred at the Moon’s ascending node of orbit on Thursday, November 8, 1984, with an umbral magnitude of −0.1825. A lunar eclipse occurs when the Moon moves into the Earth's shadow, causing the Moon to be darkened. A penumbral lunar eclipse occurs when part or all of the Moon's near side passes into the Earth's penumbra. Unlike a solar eclipse, which can only be viewed from a relatively small area of the world, a lunar eclipse may be viewed from anywhere on the night side of Earth. Occurring about 3.8 days after apogee (on November 4, 1984, at 22:40 UTC), the Moon's apparent diameter was smaller.

== Visibility ==
The eclipse was completely visible over eastern Europe, northeast Africa, Asia, and western Australia, seen rising over western Europe and west and central Africa and setting over eastern Australia, northwestern North America, and the central Pacific Ocean.

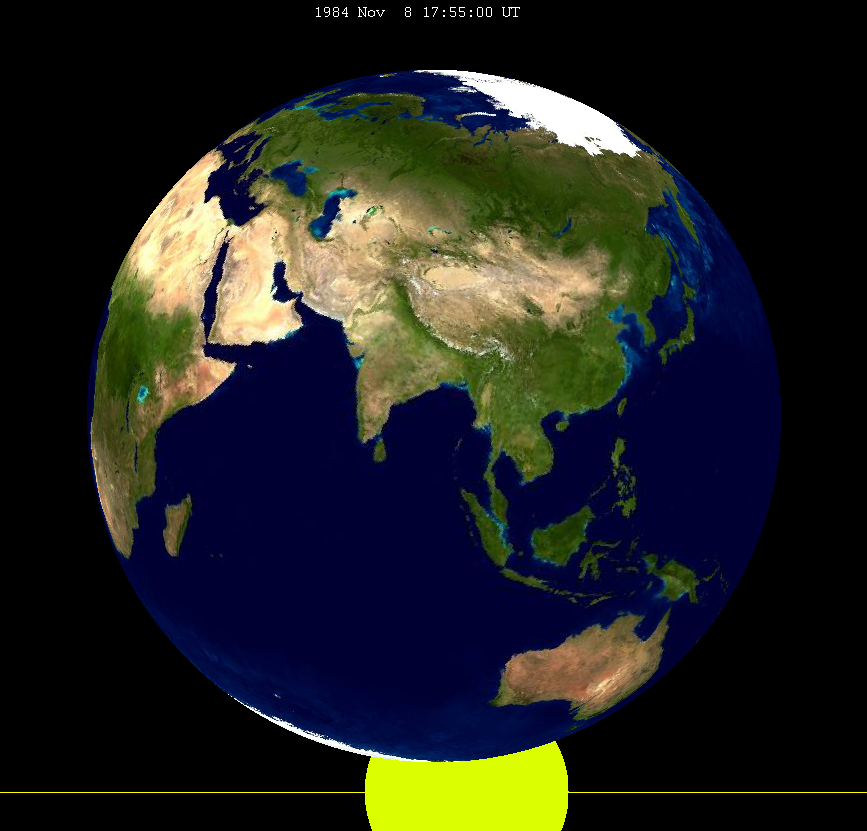
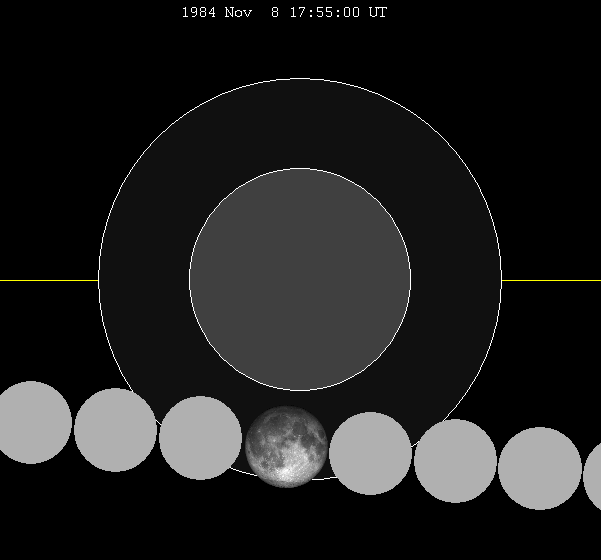

== Eclipse details ==
Shown below is a table displaying details about this particular solar eclipse. It describes various parameters pertaining to this eclipse.

November 8, 1984 Lunar Eclipse Parameters
Parameter	Value
Penumbral Magnitude	0.89929
Umbral Magnitude	−0.18247
Gamma	−1.08998
Sun Right Ascension	14h56m10.9s
Sun Declination	-16°46'34.8"
Sun Semi-Diameter	16'08.9"
Sun Equatorial Horizontal Parallax	08.9"
Moon Right Ascension	02h57m45.0s
Moon Declination	+15°51'17.9"
Moon Semi-Diameter	14'55.7"
Moon Equatorial Horizontal Parallax	0°54'47.1"
ΔT	54.2 s

== Eclipse season ==
This eclipse is part of an eclipse season, a period, roughly every six months, when eclipses occur. Only two (or occasionally three) eclipse seasons occur each year, and each season lasts about 35 days and repeats just short of six months (173 days) later; thus two full eclipse seasons always occur each year. Either two or three eclipses happen each eclipse season. In the sequence below, each eclipse is separated by a fortnight.

Eclipse season of November 1984
November 8 Ascending node (full moon)	November 22 Descending node (new moon)
Penumbral lunar eclipse Lunar Saros 116	Annular solar eclipse Solar Saros 142

== Related eclipses ==
=== Eclipses in 1984 ===
- A penumbral lunar eclipse on May 15.
- An annular solar eclipse on May 30.
- A penumbral lunar eclipse on June 13.
- A penumbral lunar eclipse on November 8.
- A total solar eclipse on November 22.

=== Metonic ===
- Preceded by: Lunar eclipse of January 20, 1981
- Followed by: Lunar eclipse of August 27, 1988

=== Tzolkinex ===
- Preceded by: Lunar eclipse of September 27, 1977
- Followed by: Lunar eclipse of December 21, 1991

=== Half-Saros ===
- Preceded by: Solar eclipse of November 3, 1975
- Followed by: Solar eclipse of November 13, 1993

=== Tritos ===
- Preceded by: Lunar eclipse of December 10, 1973
- Followed by: Lunar eclipse of October 8, 1995

=== Lunar Saros 116 ===
- Preceded by: Lunar eclipse of October 29, 1966
- Followed by: Lunar eclipse of November 20, 2002

=== Inex ===
- Preceded by: Lunar eclipse of November 29, 1955
- Followed by: Lunar eclipse of October 18, 2013

=== Triad ===
- Preceded by: Lunar eclipse of January 8, 1898
- Followed by: Lunar eclipse of September 9, 2071

=== Lunar eclipses of 1984–1987 ===
This eclipse is a member of a semester series. An eclipse in a semester series of lunar eclipses repeats approximately every 177 days and 4 hours (a semester) at alternating nodes of the Moon's orbit.

The penumbral lunar eclipse on June 13, 1984 occurs in the previous lunar year eclipse set.

Lunar eclipse series sets from 1984 to 1987
Descending node				Ascending node			
Saros	Date Viewing	Type Chart	Gamma	Saros	Date Viewing	Type Chart	Gamma
111	1984 May 15	Penumbral	1.1131	116	1984 Nov 08	Penumbral	−1.0900
121	1985 May 04	Total	0.3520	126	1985 Oct 28	Total	−0.4022
131	1986 Apr 24	Total	−0.3683	136	1986 Oct 17	Total	0.3189
141	1987 Apr 14	Penumbral	−1.1364	146	1987 Oct 07	Penumbral	1.0189

=== Metonic series ===
The Metonic cycle repeats nearly exactly every 19 years and represents a Saros cycle plus one lunar year. Because it occurs on the same calendar date, the Earth's shadow will be in nearly the same location relative to the background stars.

1. 1984 May 15.19 - penumbral (111); 2. 2003 May 16.15 - total (121); 3. 2022 May 16.17 - total (131); 4. 2041 May 16.03 - penumbral (141)	1. 1984 Nov 08.75 - penumbral (116); 2. 2003 Nov 09.05 - total (126); 3. 2022 Nov 08.46 - total (136); 4. 2041 Nov 08.19 - partial (146); 5. 2060 Nov 08.17 - penumbral (156)

=== Saros 116 ===
This eclipse is a part of Saros series 116, repeating every 18 years, 11 days, and containing 73 events. The series started with a penumbral lunar eclipse on March 11, 993 AD. It contains partial eclipses from June 16, 1155 through September 11, 1299; total eclipses from September 21, 1317 through July 11, 1786; and a second set of partial eclipses from July 22, 1804 through October 7, 1930. The series ends at member 73 as a penumbral eclipse on May 14, 2291.

The longest duration of totality was produced by member 40 at 102 minutes, 40 seconds on May 16, 1696. All eclipses in this series occur at the Moon’s ascending node of orbit.

Greatest	First			
The greatest eclipse of the series occurred on 1696 May 16, lasting 102 minutes, 40 seconds.	Penumbral	Partial	Total	Central
The greatest eclipse of the series occurred on 1696 May 16, lasting 102 minutes, 40 seconds.	993 Mar 11	1155 Jun 16	1317 Sep 21	1588 Mar 13
The greatest eclipse of the series occurred on 1696 May 16, lasting 102 minutes, 40 seconds.	Last			
The greatest eclipse of the series occurred on 1696 May 16, lasting 102 minutes, 40 seconds.	Central	Total	Partial	Penumbral
The greatest eclipse of the series occurred on 1696 May 16, lasting 102 minutes, 40 seconds.	1750 Jun 19	1786 Jul 11	1930 Oct 07	2291 May 14

Eclipses are tabulated in three columns; every third eclipse in the same column is one exeligmos apart, so they all cast shadows over approximately the same parts of the Earth.

Series members 46–67 occur between 1801 and 2200:
46	47	48
1804 Jul 22	1822 Aug 03	1840 Aug 13
49	50	51
1858 Aug 24	1876 Sep 03	1894 Sep 15
52	53	54
1912 Sep 26	1930 Oct 07	1948 Oct 18
55	56	57
1966 Oct 29	1984 Nov 08	2002 Nov 20
58	59	60
2020 Nov 30	2038 Dec 11	2056 Dec 22
61	62	63
2075 Jan 02	2093 Jan 12	2111 Jan 25
64	65	66
2129 Feb 04	2147 Feb 15	2165 Feb 26
67
2183 Mar 09

=== Tritos series ===
This eclipse is a part of a tritos cycle, repeating at alternating nodes every 135 synodic months (≈ 3986.63 days, or 11 years minus 1 month). Their appearance and longitude are irregular due to a lack of synchronization with the anomalistic month (period of perigee), but groupings of 3 tritos cycles (≈ 33 years minus 3 months) come close (≈ 434.044 anomalistic months), so eclipses are similar in these groupings.

Series members between 1801 and 2200
1810 Mar 21 (Saros 100)	1821 Feb 17 (Saros 101)	1832 Jan 17 (Saros 102)	1842 Dec 17 (Saros 103)	
1864 Oct 15 (Saros 105)	1875 Sep 15 (Saros 106)	1886 Aug 14 (Saros 107)	1897 Jul 14 (Saros 108)	1908 Jun 14 (Saros 109)
1919 May 15 (Saros 110)	1930 Apr 13 (Saros 111)	1941 Mar 13 (Saros 112)	1952 Feb 11 (Saros 113)	1963 Jan 09 (Saros 114)
1973 Dec 10 (Saros 115)	1984 Nov 08 (Saros 116)	1995 Oct 08 (Saros 117)	2006 Sep 07 (Saros 118)	2017 Aug 07 (Saros 119)
2028 Jul 06 (Saros 120)	2039 Jun 06 (Saros 121)	2050 May 06 (Saros 122)	2061 Apr 04 (Saros 123)	2072 Mar 04 (Saros 124)
2083 Feb 02 (Saros 125)	2094 Jan 01 (Saros 126)	2104 Dec 02 (Saros 127)	2115 Nov 02 (Saros 128)	2126 Oct 01 (Saros 129)
2137 Aug 30 (Saros 130)	2148 Jul 31 (Saros 131)	2159 Jun 30 (Saros 132)	2170 May 30 (Saros 133)	2181 Apr 29 (Saros 134)
2192 Mar 28 (Saros 135)

=== Inex series ===
This eclipse is a part of the long period inex cycle, repeating at alternating nodes, every 358 synodic months (≈ 10,571.95 days, or 29 years minus 20 days). Their appearance and longitude are irregular due to a lack of synchronization with the anomalistic month (period of perigee). However, groupings of 3 inex cycles (≈ 87 years minus 2 months) comes close (≈ 1,151.02 anomalistic months), so eclipses are similar in these groupings.

Series members between 1801 and 2200
1811 Mar 10 (Saros 110)	1840 Feb 17 (Saros 111)	1869 Jan 28 (Saros 112)
1898 Jan 08 (Saros 113)	1926 Dec 19 (Saros 114)	1955 Nov 29 (Saros 115)
1984 Nov 08 (Saros 116)	2013 Oct 18 (Saros 117)	2042 Sep 29 (Saros 118)
2071 Sep 09 (Saros 119)	2100 Aug 19 (Saros 120)	2129 Jul 31 (Saros 121)
2158 Jul 11 (Saros 122)	2187 Jun 20 (Saros 123)	

=== Half-Saros cycle ===
A lunar eclipse will be preceded and followed by solar eclipses by 9 years and 5.5 days (a half saros). This lunar eclipse is related to two partial solar eclipses of Solar Saros 123.

November 3, 1975	November 13, 1993

== See also ==
- List of lunar eclipses
- List of 20th-century lunar eclipses
