= Lunar Saros 116 =

Eclipse cycle of the moon

Member 58
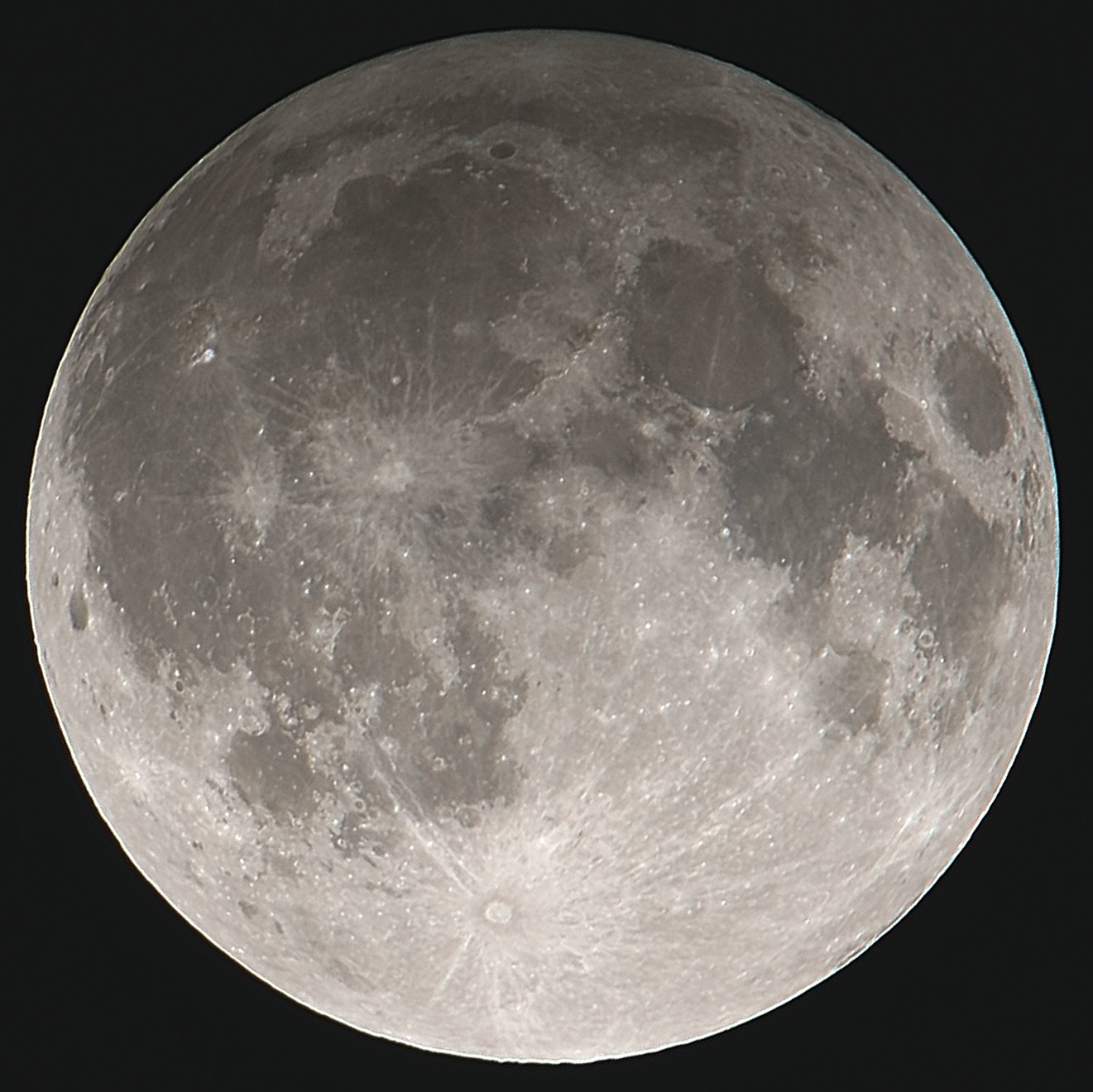
2020 Nov 30

Saros cycle series 116 for lunar eclipses occurs at the moon's ascending node, 18 years 11 and 1/3 days. It contains 73 events.

| Cat. | Saros | Mem | Date | Time UT (hr:mn) | Type | Gamma | Magnitude | Duration (min) | | | Contacts UT (hr:mn) | | | | | | Chart |
| Cat. | Saros | Mem | Date | Greatest | Type | Gamma | Magnitude | Pen. | Par. | Tot. | P1 | P4 | U1 | U2 | U3 | U4 | Chart |
|---|---|---|---|---|---|---|---|---|---|---|---|---|---|---|---|---|---|
| 07200 | 116 | 1 | 993 Mar 11 | 0:08:28 | Penumbral | 1.5408 | -0.9489 | 26.5 | | | 23:55:13 | 0:21:43 | | | | | |
| 07244 | 116 | 2 | 1011 Mar 22 | 8:13:07 | Penumbral | 1.5000 | -0.8721 | 76.6 | | | 7:34:49 | 8:51:25 | | | | | |
| 07289 | 116 | 3 | 1029 Apr 01 | 16:09:21 | Penumbral | 1.4523 | -0.7830 | 108.2 | | | 15:15:15 | 17:03:27 | | | | | |
| 07333 | 116 | 4 | 1047 Apr 13 | 0:00:20 | Penumbral | 1.4005 | -0.6862 | 133.6 | | | 22:53:32 | 1:07:08 | | | | | |
| 07377 | 116 | 5 | 1065 Apr 23 | 7:42:38 | Penumbral | 1.3416 | -0.5768 | 156.7 | | | 6:24:17 | 9:00:59 | | | | | |
| 07421 | 116 | 6 | 1083 May 4 | 15:21:46 | Penumbral | 1.2799 | -0.4625 | 176.9 | | | 13:53:19 | 16:50:13 | | | | | |
| 07467 | 116 | 7 | 1101 May 14 | 22:54:41 | Penumbral | 1.2128 | -0.3385 | 195.7 | | | 21:16:50 | 0:32:32 | | | | | |
| 07513 | 116 | 8 | 1119 May 26 | 6:25:57 | Penumbral | 1.1443 | -0.2124 | 212.3 | | | 4:39:48 | 8:12:06 | | | | | |
| 07559 | 116 | 9 | 1137 Jun 5 | 13:52:59 | Penumbral | 1.0723 | -0.08 | 227.7 | | | 11:59:08 | 15:46:50 | | | | | |
| 07606 | 116 | 10 | 1155 Jun 16 | 21:20:48 | Partial | 1.0007 | 0.0511 | 241.2 | 48.9 | | 19:20:12 | 23:21:24 | 20:56:21 | | | 21:45:15 | |
| 07653 | 116 | 11 | 1173 Jun 27 | 4:47:42 | Partial | 0.9282 | 0.1837 | 253.4 | 91.1 | | 2:41:00 | 6:54:24 | 4:02:09 | | | 5:33:15 | |
| 07699 | 116 | 12 | 1191 Jul 8 | 12:16:23 | Partial | 0.8572 | 0.3133 | 264.2 | 116.9 | | 10:04:17 | 14:28:29 | 11:17:56 | | | 13:14:50 | |
| 07745 | 116 | 13 | 1209 Jul 18 | 19:47:15 | Partial | 0.7880 | 0.4391 | 273.6 | 136.0 | | 17:30:27 | 22:04:03 | 18:39:15 | | | 20:55:15 | |
| 07791 | 116 | 14 | 1227 Jul 30 | 3:22:22 | Partial | 0.7224 | 0.5580 | 281.8 | 150.7 | | 1:01:28 | 5:43:16 | 2:07:01 | | | 4:37:43 | |
| 07836 | 116 | 15 | 1245 Aug 09 | 11:02:11 | Partial | 0.6610 | 0.6691 | 288.8 | 162.3 | | 8:37:47 | 13:26:35 | 9:41:02 | | | 12:23:20 | |
| 07881 | 116 | 16 | 1263 Aug 20 | 18:47:02 | Partial | 0.6041 | 0.7717 | 294.9 | 171.6 | | 16:19:35 | 21:14:29 | 17:21:14 | | | 20:12:50 | |
| 07926 | 116 | 17 | 1281 Aug 31 | 2:38:37 | Partial | 0.5531 | 0.8632 | 300.0 | 178.9 | | 0:08:37 | 5:08:37 | 1:09:10 | | | 4:08:04 | |
| 07971 | 116 | 18 | 1299 Sep 11 | 10:36:37 | Partial | 0.5076 | 0.9444 | 304.4 | 184.7 | | 8:04:25 | 13:08:49 | 9:04:16 | | | 12:08:58 | |
| 08015 | 116 | 19 | 1317 Sep 21 | 18:41:57 | Total | 0.4690 | 1.0130 | 308.0 | 189.3 | 17.1 | 16:07:57 | 21:15:57 | 17:07:18 | 18:33:24 | 18:50:30 | 20:16:36 | |
| 08058 | 116 | 20 | 1335 Oct 03 | 2:54:06 | Total | 0.4364 | 1.0705 | 311.1 | 192.8 | 39.1 | 0:18:33 | 5:29:39 | 1:17:42 | 2:34:33 | 3:13:39 | 4:30:30 | |
| 08100 | 116 | 21 | 1353 Oct 13 | 11:14:11 | Total | 0.4109 | 1.1148 | 313.6 | 195.4 | 49.3 | 8:37:23 | 13:50:59 | 9:36:29 | 10:49:32 | 11:38:50 | 12:51:53 | |
| 08141 | 116 | 22 | 1371 Oct 24 | 19:40:31 | Total | 0.3911 | 1.1490 | 315.8 | 197.4 | 55.7 | 17:02:37 | 22:18:25 | 18:01:49 | 19:12:40 | 20:08:22 | 21:19:13 | |
| 08182 | 116 | 23 | 1389 Nov 04 | 4:12:46 | Total | 0.3767 | 1.1733 | 317.6 | 198.9 | 59.6 | 1:33:58 | 6:51:34 | 2:33:19 | 3:42:58 | 4:42:34 | 5:52:13 | |
| 08223 | 116 | 24 | 1407 Nov 15 | 12:50:10 | Total | 0.3670 | 1.1892 | 319.2 | 199.9 | 62.1 | 10:10:34 | 15:29:46 | 11:10:13 | 12:19:07 | 13:21:13 | 14:30:07 | |
| 08264 | 116 | 25 | 1425 Nov 25 | 21:31:52 | Total | 0.3617 | 1.1971 | 320.5 | 200.7 | 63.3 | 18:51:37 | 0:12:07 | 19:51:31 | 21:00:13 | 22:03:31 | 23:12:13 | |
| 08306 | 116 | 26 | 1443 Dec 07 | 6:15:30 | Total | 0.3582 | 1.2020 | 321.7 | 201.3 | 64.1 | 3:34:39 | 8:56:21 | 4:34:51 | 5:43:27 | 6:47:33 | 7:56:09 | |
| 08347 | 116 | 27 | 1461 Dec 17 | 15:00:00 | Total | 0.3559 | 1.2048 | 322.9 | 201.9 | 64.6 | 12:18:33 | 17:41:27 | 13:19:03 | 14:27:42 | 15:32:18 | 16:40:57 | |
| 08387 | 116 | 28 | 1479 Dec 28 | 23:43:31 | Total | 0.3535 | 1.2083 | 324.0 | 202.5 | 65.2 | 21:01:31 | 2:25:31 | 22:02:16 | 23:10:55 | 0:16:07 | 1:24:46 | |
| 08427 | 116 | 29 | 1498 Jan 08 | 8:25:32 | Total | 0.3505 | 1.2130 | 325.1 | 203.2 | 65.9 | 5:42:59 | 11:08:05 | 6:43:56 | 7:52:35 | 8:58:29 | 10:07:08 | |
| 08467 | 116 | 30 | 1516 Jan 19 | 17:02:13 | Total | 0.3438 | 1.2248 | 326.4 | 204.2 | 67.6 | 14:19:01 | 19:45:25 | 15:20:07 | 16:28:25 | 17:36:01 | 18:44:19 | |
| 08508 | 116 | 31 | 1534 Jan 30 | 1:34:32 | Total | 0.3341 | 1.2421 | 327.8 | 205.4 | 70.0 | 22:50:38 | 4:18:26 | 23:51:50 | 0:59:32 | 2:09:32 | 3:17:14 | |
| 08550 | 116 | 32 | 1552 Feb 10 | 9:58:45 | Total | 0.3183 | 1.2708 | 329.5 | 207.2 | 73.5 | 7:14:00 | 12:43:30 | 8:15:09 | 9:22:00 | 10:35:30 | 11:42:21 | |
| 08594 | 116 | 33 | 1570 Feb 20 | 18:16:30 | Total | 0.2981 | 1.3078 | 331.4 | 209.2 | 77.5 | 15:30:48 | 21:02:12 | 16:31:54 | 17:37:45 | 18:55:15 | 20:01:06 | |
| 08637 | 116 | 34 | 1588 Mar 13 | 2:23:35 | Total | 0.2698 | 1.3596 | 333.5 | 211.6 | 82.5 | 23:36:50 | 5:10:20 | 0:37:47 | 1:42:20 | 3:04:50 | 4:09:23 | |
| 08680 | 116 | 35 | 1606 Mar 24 | 10:23:18 | Total | 0.2363 | 1.4211 | 335.8 | 214.1 | 87.5 | 7:35:24 | 13:11:12 | 8:36:15 | 9:39:33 | 11:07:03 | 12:10:21 | |
| 08725 | 116 | 36 | 1624 Apr 03 | 18:12:08 | Total | 0.1945 | 1.4977 | 338.1 | 216.8 | 92.5 | 15:23:05 | 21:01:11 | 16:23:44 | 17:25:53 | 18:58:23 | 20:00:32 | |
| 08769 | 116 | 37 | 1642 Apr 15 | 1:52:19 | Total | 0.1463 | 1.5860 | 340.4 | 219.3 | 96.9 | 23:02:07 | 4:42:31 | 0:02:40 | 1:03:52 | 2:40:46 | 3:41:58 | |
| 08814 | 116 | 38 | 1660 Apr 25 | 9:22:01 | Total | 0.0901 | 1.6890 | 342.5 | 221.4 | 100.5 | 6:30:46 | 12:13:16 | 7:31:19 | 8:31:46 | 10:12:16 | 11:12:43 | |
| 08859 | 116 | 39 | 1678 May 6 | 16:44:20 | Total | 0.0285 | 1.8015 | 344.3 | 223.0 | 102.5 | 13:52:11 | 19:36:29 | 14:52:50 | 15:53:05 | 17:35:35 | 18:35:50 | |
| 08905 | 116 | 40 | 1696 May 16 | 23:58:19 | Total | -0.0392 | 1.7813 | 345.5 | 223.6 | 102.7 | 21:05:34 | 2:51:04 | 22:06:31 | 23:06:58 | 0:49:40 | 1:50:07 | |
| 08951 | 116 | 41 | 1714 May 29 | 7:05:03 | Total | -0.1120 | 1.6468 | 346.1 | 223.1 | 100.3 | 4:12:00 | 9:58:06 | 5:13:30 | 6:14:54 | 7:55:12 | 8:56:36 | |
| 08998 | 116 | 42 | 1732 Jun 08 | 14:06:11 | Total | -0.1888 | 1.5049 | 345.9 | 221.2 | 94.6 | 11:13:14 | 16:59:08 | 12:15:35 | 13:18:53 | 14:53:29 | 15:56:47 | |
| 09045 | 116 | 43 | 1750 Jun 19 | 21:03:03 | Total | -0.2684 | 1.3573 | 344.7 | 217.7 | 84.6 | 18:10:42 | 23:55:24 | 19:14:12 | 20:20:45 | 21:45:21 | 22:51:54 | |
| 09092 | 116 | 44 | 1768 Jun 30 | 3:56:19 | Total | -0.3499 | 1.2062 | 342.6 | 212.5 | 68.0 | 1:05:01 | 6:47:37 | 2:10:04 | 3:22:19 | 4:30:19 | 5:42:34 | |
| 09137 | 116 | 45 | 1786 Jul 11 | 10:47:19 | Total | -0.4324 | 1.0530 | 339.3 | 205.2 | 36.3 | 7:57:40 | 13:36:58 | 9:04:43 | 10:29:10 | 11:05:28 | 12:29:55 | |
| 09182 | 116 | 46 | 1804 Jul 22 | 17:38:00 | Partial | -0.5141 | 0.9011 | 335.0 | 195.8 | | 14:50:30 | 20:25:30 | 16:00:06 | | | 19:15:54 | |
| 09227 | 116 | 47 | 1822 Aug 03 | 0:30:07 | Partial | -0.5938 | 0.7526 | 329.8 | 184.2 | | 21:45:13 | 3:15:01 | 22:58:01 | | | 2:02:13 | |
| 09273 | 116 | 48 | 1840 Aug 13 | 7:23:08 | Partial | -0.6716 | 0.6074 | 323.5 | 170.0 | | 4:41:23 | 10:04:53 | 5:58:08 | | | 8:48:08 | |
| 09318 | 116 | 49 | 1858 Aug 24 | 14:20:46 | Partial | -0.7446 | 0.4707 | 316.7 | 153.4 | | 11:42:25 | 16:59:07 | 13:04:04 | | | 15:37:28 | |
| 09362 | 116 | 50 | 1876 Sep 03 | 21:22:33 | Partial | -0.8130 | 0.3425 | 309.2 | 133.9 | | 18:47:57 | 23:57:09 | 20:15:36 | | | 22:29:30 | |
| 09406 | 116 | 51 | 1894 Sep 15 | 4:31:25 | Partial | -0.8748 | 0.2261 | 301.7 | 110.9 | | 2:00:34 | 7:02:16 | 3:35:58 | | | 5:26:52 | |
| 09448 | 116 | 52 | 1912 Sep 26 | 11:44:50 | Partial | -0.9320 | 0.1183 | 293.9 | 81.7 | | 9:17:53 | 14:11:47 | 11:03:59 | | | 12:25:41 | |
| 09490 | 116 | 53 | 1930 Oct 07 | 19:07:10 | Partial | -0.9811 | 0.0252 | 286.6 | 38.3 | | 16:43:52 | 21:30:28 | 18:48:01 | | | 19:26:19 | |
| 09532 | 116 | 54 | 1948 Oct 18 | 2:35:41 | Penumbral | -1.0245 | -0.0572 | 279.7 | | | 0:15:50 | 4:55:32 | | | | | |
| 09573 | 116 | 55 | 1966 Oct 29 | 10:12:53 | Penumbral | -1.0599 | -0.1249 | 273.7 | | | 7:56:02 | 12:29:44 | | | | | |
| 09615 | 116 | 56 | 1984 Nov 08 | 17:56:08 | Penumbral | -1.0899 | -0.1825 | 268.4 | | | 15:41:56 | 20:10:20 | | | | | |
| 09656 | 116 | 57 | 2002 Nov 20 | 1:47:40 | Penumbral | -1.1126 | -0.2264 | 264.3 | | | 23:35:31 | 3:59:49 | | | | | |
| 09697 | 116 | 58 | 2020 Nov 30 | 9:44:01 | Penumbral | -1.1309 | -0.2620 | 261.0 | | | 7:33:31 | 11:54:31 | | | | | |
| 09738 | 116 | 59 | 2038 Dec 11 | 17:45:00 | Penumbral | -1.1448 | -0.2892 | 258.5 | | | 15:35:45 | 19:54:15 | | | | | |
| 09778 | 116 | 60 | 2056 Dec 22 | 1:48:56 | Penumbral | -1.1559 | -0.3109 | 256.4 | | | 23:40:44 | 3:57:08 | | | | | |
| 09819 | 116 | 61 | 2075 Jan 02 | 9:55:03 | Penumbral | -1.1642 | -0.3271 | 254.9 | | | 7:47:36 | 12:02:30 | | | | | |
| 09860 | 116 | 62 | 2093 Jan 12 | 18:00:03 | Penumbral | -1.1733 | -0.3444 | 253.1 | | | 15:53:30 | 20:06:36 | | | | | |
| 09902 | 116 | 63 | 2111 Jan 25 | 2:03:07 | Penumbral | -1.1833 | -0.3630 | 250.8 | | | 23:57:43 | 4:08:31 | | | | | |
| 09944 | 116 | 64 | 2129 Feb 04 | 10:02:24 | Penumbral | -1.1959 | -0.3858 | 247.6 | | | 7:58:36 | 12:06:12 | | | | | |
| 09987 | 116 | 65 | 2147 Feb 15 | 17:57:14 | Penumbral | -1.2114 | -0.4138 | 243.4 | | | 15:55:32 | 19:58:56 | | | | | |
| 10031 | 116 | 66 | 2165 Feb 26 | 1:44:02 | Penumbral | -1.2329 | -0.4524 | 237.1 | | | 23:45:29 | 3:42:35 | | | | | |
| 10074 | 116 | 67 | 2183 Mar 09 | 9:24:16 | Penumbral | -1.2592 | -0.4997 | 229.0 | | | 7:29:46 | 11:18:46 | | | | | |
| 10117 | 116 | 68 | 2201 Mar 20 | 16:55:04 | Penumbral | -1.2929 | -0.5602 | 217.8 | | | 15:06:10 | 18:43:58 | | | | | |
| 10161 | 116 | 69 | 2219 Apr 01 | 0:18:15 | Penumbral | -1.3322 | -0.6309 | 203.5 | | | 22:36:30 | 2:00:00 | | | | | |
| 10205 | 116 | 70 | 2237 Apr 11 | 7:30:45 | Penumbral | -1.3795 | -0.7163 | 184.3 | | | 5:58:36 | 9:02:54 | | | | | |
| 10250 | 116 | 71 | 2255 Apr 22 | 14:36:07 | Penumbral | -1.4324 | -0.8116 | 159.2 | | | 13:16:31 | 15:55:43 | | | | | |
| 10296 | 116 | 72 | 2273 May 2 | 21:31:53 | Penumbral | -1.4925 | -0.9205 | 123.2 | | | 20:30:17 | 22:33:29 | | | | | |
| 10343 | 116 | 73 | 2291 May 14 | 4:20:25 | Penumbral | -1.5580 | -1.0391 | 60.6 | | | 3:50:07 | 4:50:43 | | | | | |

== See also ==
- List of lunar eclipses
  - List of Saros series for lunar eclipses
