= Tetrad =

Tetrad ('group of 4') or tetrade may refer to:

- Tetrad (area), an area 2 km x 2 km square
- Tetrad (astronomy), four total lunar eclipses within two years
- Tetrad (chromosomal formation)
- Tetrad (general relativity), or frame field
  - Tetrad formalism, an approach to general relativity
- Tetrad (geometry puzzle), a set of four simply connected disjoint planar regions in the plane
- Tetrad (meiosis), the four cells produced by meiotic cell division
- Tetrad (music), a set of four notes
- Tetrad (symbol), or tetractys, a triangular figure of ten points arranged in four rows, and mystical symbol
- Medical tetrad, a group of four signs or symptoms which characterise a specific medical condition
- Nibble, or tetrade, a 4-bit group
- a tuple of length 4
- Tetrad Islands, in the Antarctic

== See also ==
- 4
- Triad (disambiguation) ('group of 3')
- Pentad (disambiguation) ('group of 5')
- Dark tetrad, group of four undesirable personality traits
- Tetrad of media effects, a pedagogical tool
- Tetromino, a shape composed of four squares
