= 1986 lunar eclipse =

Two total lunar eclipses occurred in 1986:

- 24 April 1986 lunar eclipse
- 17 October 1986 lunar eclipse

== See also ==
- List of 20th-century lunar eclipses
- Lists of lunar eclipses
