= September 1950 lunar eclipse =

Total lunar eclipse September 25, 1950

- Total eclipse
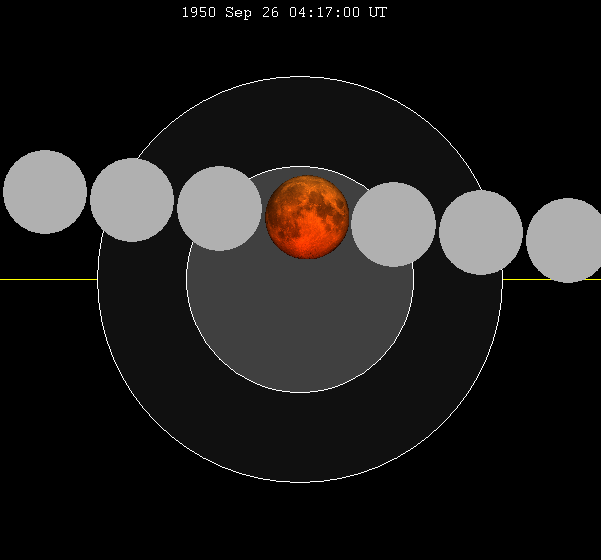
- The Moon's hourly motion shown right to left
- Date: September 26, 1950
- Gamma: 0.4101
- Magnitude: 1.0783
- Saros cycle: 136 (16 of 72)
- Totality: 44 minutes, 16 seconds
- Partiality: 209 minutes, 45 seconds
- Penumbral: 350 minutes, 4 seconds
Contacts (UTC)
- P1: 1:21:43
- U1: 2:31:48
- U2: 3:54:33
- Greatest: 4:16:42
- U3: 4:38:49
- U4: 6:01:33
- P4: 7:11:47

A total lunar eclipse occurred at the Moon’s ascending node of orbit on Tuesday, September 26, 1950, with an umbral magnitude of 1.0783. A lunar eclipse occurs when the Moon moves into the Earth's shadow, causing the Moon to be darkened. A total lunar eclipse occurs when the Moon's near side entirely passes into the Earth's umbral shadow. Unlike a solar eclipse, which can only be viewed from a relatively small area of the world, a lunar eclipse may be viewed from anywhere on the night side of Earth. A total lunar eclipse can last up to nearly two hours, while a total solar eclipse lasts only a few minutes at any given place, because the Moon's shadow is smaller. Occurring about 5.1 days before apogee (on October 1, 1950, at 5:30 UTC), the Moon's apparent diameter was smaller.

This lunar eclipse was the last of a tetrad, with four total lunar eclipses in series, the others being on April 13, 1949; October 7, 1949; and April 2, 1950.

== Visibility ==
The eclipse was completely visible over much of North and South America, seen rising over northwestern North America and the central Pacific Ocean and setting over Africa, Europe, and the Middle East.

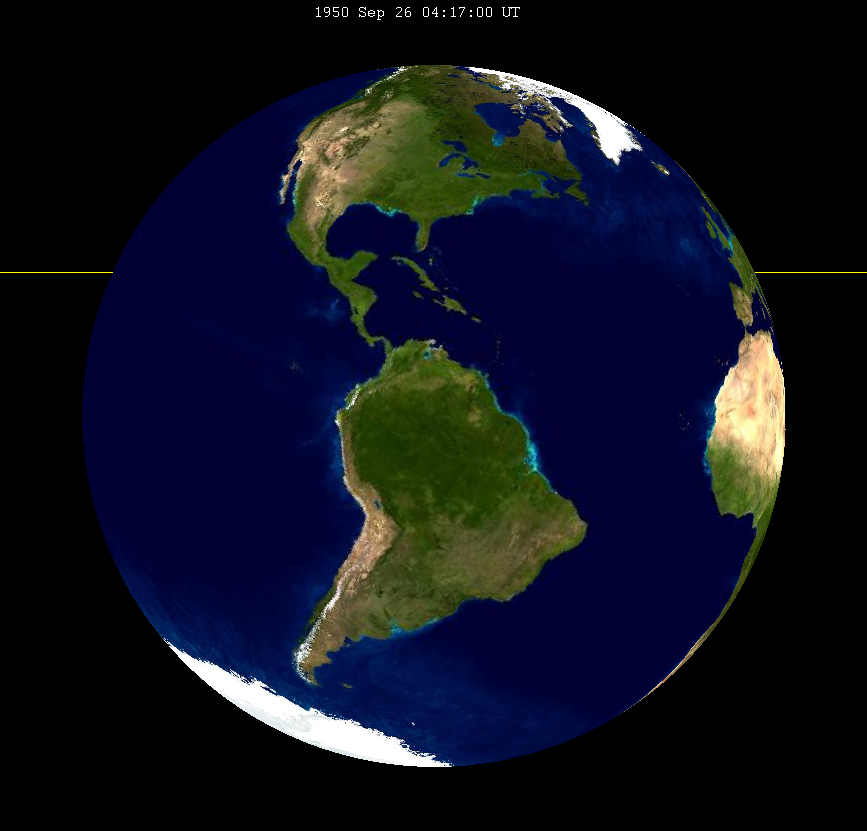
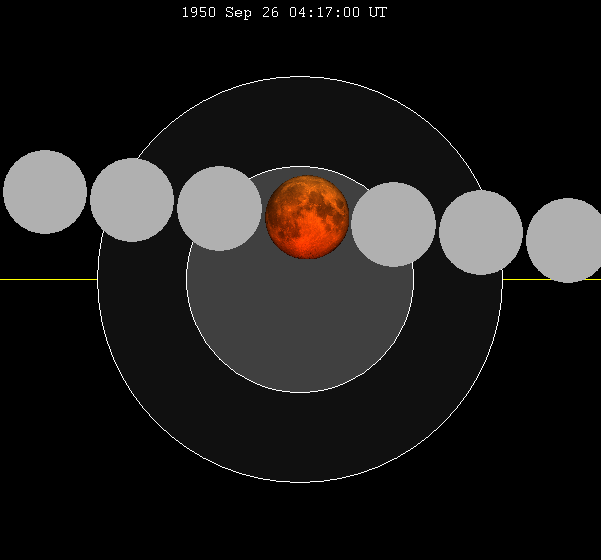

== Eclipse details ==
Shown below is a table displaying details about this particular lunar eclipse. It describes various parameters pertaining to this eclipse.

September 26, 1950 Lunar Eclipse Parameters
Parameter	Value
Penumbral Magnitude	2.13305
Umbral Magnitude	1.07834
Gamma	0.41012
Sun Right Ascension	12h09m13.2s
Sun Declination	-00°59'57.3"
Sun Semi-Diameter	15'57.2"
Sun Equatorial Horizontal Parallax	08.8"
Moon Right Ascension	00h08m28.8s
Moon Declination	+01°19'50.3"
Moon Semi-Diameter	15'07.6"
Moon Equatorial Horizontal Parallax	0°55'30.9"
ΔT	29.4 s

== Eclipse season ==
This eclipse is part of an eclipse season, a period, roughly every six months, when eclipses occur. Only two (or occasionally three) eclipse seasons occur each year. Each season lasts about 35 days and repeats just short of six months (173 days) later. thus two full eclipse seasons always occur each year. Either two or three eclipses happen each eclipse season. In the sequence below, each eclipse is separated by a fortnight.

Eclipse season of September 1950
September 12 Descending node (new moon)	September 26 Ascending node (full moon)
Total solar eclipse Solar Saros 124	Total lunar eclipse Lunar Saros 136

== Related eclipses ==
=== Eclipses in 1950 ===
- A non-central annular solar eclipse on March 18.
- A total lunar eclipse on April 2.
- A total solar eclipse on September 12.
- A total lunar eclipse on September 26.

=== Metonic ===
- Preceded by: Lunar eclipse of December 8, 1946
- Followed by: Lunar eclipse of July 16, 1954

=== Tzolkinex ===
- Preceded by: Lunar eclipse of August 15, 1943
- Followed by: Lunar eclipse of November 7, 1957

=== Half-Saros ===
- Preceded by: Solar eclipse of September 21, 1941
- Followed by: Solar eclipse of October 2, 1959

=== Tritos ===
- Preceded by: Lunar eclipse of October 28, 1939
- Followed by: Lunar eclipse of August 26, 1961

=== Lunar Saros 136 ===
- Preceded by: Lunar eclipse of September 14, 1932
- Followed by: Lunar eclipse of October 6, 1968

=== Inex ===
- Preceded by: Lunar eclipse of October 16, 1921
- Followed by: Lunar eclipse of September 6, 1979

=== Triad ===
- Preceded by: Lunar eclipse of November 25, 1863
- Followed by: Lunar eclipse of July 27, 2037

=== Lunar eclipses of 1948–1951 ===
This eclipse is a member of a semester series. An eclipse in a semester series of lunar eclipses repeats approximately every 177 days and 4 hours (a semester) at alternating nodes of the Moon's orbit.

The penumbral lunar eclipses on February 21, 1951 and August 17, 1951 occur in the next lunar year eclipse set.

Lunar eclipse series sets from 1948 to 1951
Descending node				Ascending node			
Saros	Date Viewing	Type Chart	Gamma	Saros	Date Viewing	Type Chart	Gamma
111	1948 Apr 23	Partial	1.0017	116	1948 Oct 18	Penumbral	−1.0245
121	1949 Apr 13	Total	0.2474	126	1949 Oct 07	Total	−0.3219
131	1950 Apr 02	Total	−0.4599	136	1950 Sep 26	Total	0.4101
141	1951 Mar 23	Penumbral	−1.2099	146	1951 Sep 15	Penumbral	1.1187

=== Saros 136 ===
This eclipse is a part of Saros series 136, repeating every 18 years, 11 days, and containing 72 events. The series started with a penumbral lunar eclipse on April 13, 1680. It contains partial eclipses from July 11, 1824 through September 14, 1932; total eclipses from September 26, 1950 through July 7, 2419; and a second set of partial eclipses from July 18, 2437 through October 3, 2563. The series ends at member 72 as a penumbral eclipse on June 1, 2960.

The longest duration of totality will be produced by member 35 at 101 minutes, 23 seconds on April 21, 2293. All eclipses in this series occur at the Moon’s ascending node of orbit.

Greatest	First			
The greatest eclipse of the series will occur on 2293 Apr 21, lasting 101 minutes, 23 seconds.	Penumbral	Partial	Total	Central
The greatest eclipse of the series will occur on 2293 Apr 21, lasting 101 minutes, 23 seconds.	1680 Apr 13	1824 Jul 11	1950 Sep 26	2022 Nov 08
The greatest eclipse of the series will occur on 2293 Apr 21, lasting 101 minutes, 23 seconds.	Last			
The greatest eclipse of the series will occur on 2293 Apr 21, lasting 101 minutes, 23 seconds.	Central	Total	Partial	Penumbral
The greatest eclipse of the series will occur on 2293 Apr 21, lasting 101 minutes, 23 seconds.	2365 Jun 04	2419 Jul 07	2563 Oct 03	2960 Jun 01

Eclipses are tabulated in three columns; every third eclipse in the same column is one exeligmos apart, so they all cast shadows over approximately the same parts of the Earth.

Series members 8–29 occur between 1801 and 2200:
8	9	10
1806 Jun 30	1824 Jul 11	1842 Jul 22
11	12	13
1860 Aug 01	1878 Aug 13	1896 Aug 23
14	15	16
1914 Sep 04	1932 Sep 14	1950 Sep 26
17	18	19
1968 Oct 06	1986 Oct 17	2004 Oct 28
20	21	22
2022 Nov 08	2040 Nov 18	2058 Nov 30
23	24	25
2076 Dec 10	2094 Dec 21	2113 Jan 02
26	27	28
2131 Jan 13	2149 Jan 23	2167 Feb 04
29
2185 Feb 14

=== Tritos series ===
This eclipse is a part of a tritos cycle, repeating at alternating nodes every 135 synodic months (≈ 3986.63 days, or 11 years minus 1 month). Their appearance and longitude are irregular due to a lack of synchronization with the anomalistic month (period of perigee), but groupings of 3 tritos cycles (≈ 33 years minus 3 months) come close (≈ 434.044 anomalistic months), so eclipses are similar in these groupings.

Series members between 1801 and 2200
1808 Nov 03 (Saros 123)	1819 Oct 03 (Saros 124)	1830 Sep 02 (Saros 125)	1841 Aug 02 (Saros 126)	1852 Jul 01 (Saros 127)
1863 Jun 01 (Saros 128)	1874 May 01 (Saros 129)	1885 Mar 30 (Saros 130)	1896 Feb 28 (Saros 131)	1907 Jan 29 (Saros 132)
1917 Dec 28 (Saros 133)	1928 Nov 27 (Saros 134)	1939 Oct 28 (Saros 135)	1950 Sep 26 (Saros 136)	1961 Aug 26 (Saros 137)
1972 Jul 26 (Saros 138)	1983 Jun 25 (Saros 139)	1994 May 25 (Saros 140)	2005 Apr 24 (Saros 141)	2016 Mar 23 (Saros 142)
2027 Feb 20 (Saros 143)	2038 Jan 21 (Saros 144)	2048 Dec 20 (Saros 145)	2059 Nov 19 (Saros 146)	2070 Oct 19 (Saros 147)
2081 Sep 18 (Saros 148)	2092 Aug 17 (Saros 149)	2103 Jul 19 (Saros 150)	2114 Jun 18 (Saros 151)	2125 May 17 (Saros 152)
2136 Apr 16 (Saros 153)			2169 Jan 13 (Saros 156)	
2190 Nov 12 (Saros 158)

=== Inex series ===
This eclipse is a part of the long period inex cycle, repeating at alternating nodes, every 358 synodic months (≈ 10,571.95 days, or 29 years minus 20 days). Their appearance and longitude are irregular due to a lack of synchronization with the anomalistic month (period of perigee). However, groupings of 3 inex cycles (≈ 87 years minus 2 months) comes close (≈ 1,151.02 anomalistic months), so eclipses are similar in these groupings.

Series members between 1801 and 2200
1806 Jan 05 (Saros 131)	1834 Dec 16 (Saros 132)	1863 Nov 25 (Saros 133)
1892 Nov 04 (Saros 134)	1921 Oct 16 (Saros 135)	1950 Sep 26 (Saros 136)
1979 Sep 06 (Saros 137)	2008 Aug 16 (Saros 138)	2037 Jul 27 (Saros 139)
2066 Jul 07 (Saros 140)	2095 Jun 17 (Saros 141)	2124 May 28 (Saros 142)
2153 May 08 (Saros 143)	2182 Apr 18 (Saros 144)	

=== Half-Saros cycle ===
A lunar eclipse will be preceded and followed by solar eclipses by 9 years and 5.5 days (a half saros). This lunar eclipse is related to two total solar eclipses of Solar Saros 143.

September 21, 1941	October 2, 1959

== See also ==
- List of lunar eclipses
- List of 20th-century lunar eclipses
