= November 2040 lunar eclipse =

Central lunar eclipse

- Total eclipse
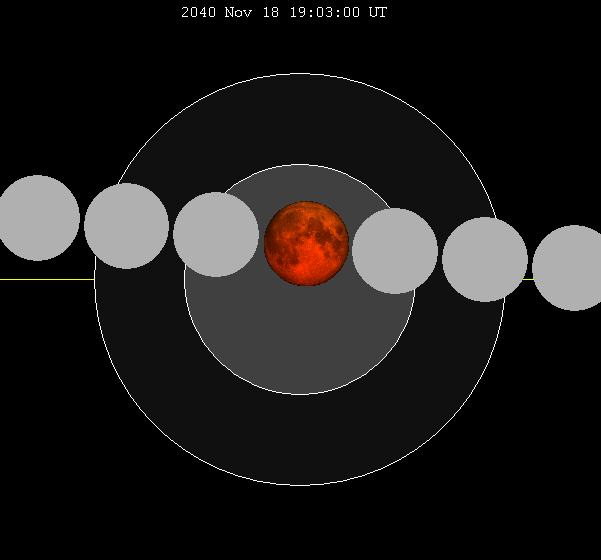
- The Moon's hourly motion shown right to left
- Date: November 18, 2040
- Gamma: 0.2361
- Magnitude: 1.3991
- Saros cycle: 136 (21 of 72)
- Totality: 87 minutes, 28 seconds
- Partiality: 220 minutes, 24 seconds
- Penumbral: 353 minutes, 36 seconds
Contacts (UTC)
- P1: 16:07:52
- U1: 17:14:28
- U2: 18:20:46
- Greatest: 19:04:40
- U3: 19:48:34
- U4: 20:54:52
- P4: 22:01:28

A total lunar eclipse will occur at the Moon's ascending node of orbit on Sunday, November 18, 2040, with an umbral magnitude of 1.3991. It will be a central lunar eclipse, in which part of the Moon will pass through the center of the Earth's shadow. A lunar eclipse occurs when the Moon moves into the Earth's shadow, causing the Moon to be darkened. A total lunar eclipse occurs when the Moon's near side entirely passes into the Earth's umbral shadow. Unlike a solar eclipse, which can only be viewed from a relatively small area of the world, a lunar eclipse may be viewed from anywhere on the night side of Earth. A total lunar eclipse can last up to nearly two hours, while a total solar eclipse lasts only a few minutes at any given place, because the Moon's shadow is smaller. Occurring about 5.7 days before apogee (on November 24, 2040, at 14:10 UTC), the Moon's apparent diameter will be smaller.

This is the second central lunar eclipse of Saros series 136, the first taking place on November 8, 2022.

== Visibility ==
The eclipse will be completely visible over east Africa, Europe, and Asia, seen rising over west Africa and eastern North and South America and setting over Australia and the western Pacific Ocean.

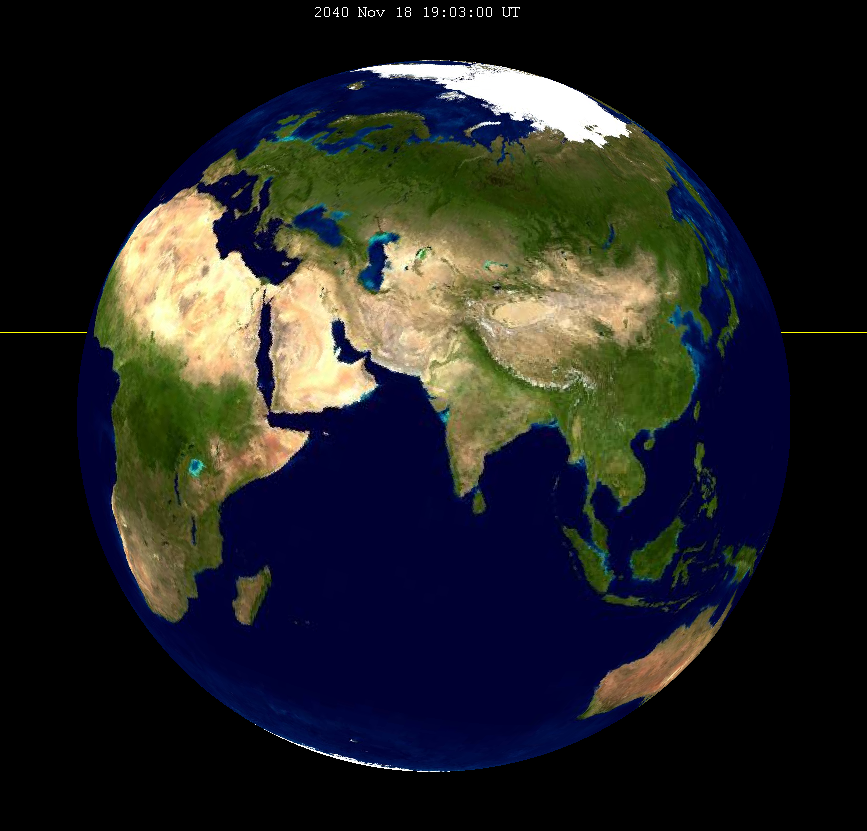
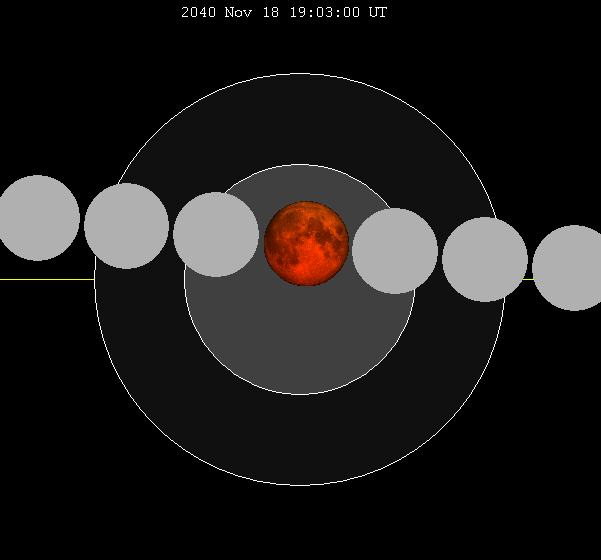

== Eclipse details ==
Shown below is a table displaying details about this particular eclipse. It describes various parameters pertaining to this eclipse.

November 18, 2040 Lunar Eclipse Parameters
Parameter	Value
Penumbral Magnitude	2.45427
Umbral Magnitude	1.39914
Gamma	0.23613
Sun Right Ascension	15h39m03.9s
Sun Declination	-19°29'49.7"
Sun Semi-Diameter	16'11.0"
Sun Equatorial Horizontal Parallax	08.9"
Moon Right Ascension	03h38m45.6s
Moon Declination	+19°42'23.6"
Moon Semi-Diameter	15'20.2"
Moon Equatorial Horizontal Parallax	0°56'17.3"
ΔT	79.6 s

== Eclipse season ==
This eclipse is part of an eclipse season, a period, roughly every six months, when eclipses occur. Only two (or occasionally three) eclipse seasons occur each year, and each season lasts about 35 days and repeats just short of six months (173 days) later; thus two full eclipse seasons always occur each year. Either two or three eclipses happen each eclipse season. In the sequence below, each eclipse is separated by a fortnight.

Eclipse season of November 2040
November 4 Descending node (new moon)	November 18 Ascending node (full moon)
Partial solar eclipse Solar Saros 124	Total lunar eclipse Lunar Saros 136

== Related eclipses ==
=== Eclipses in 2040 ===
- A partial solar eclipse on May 11.
- A total lunar eclipse on May 26.
- A partial solar eclipse on November 4.
- A total lunar eclipse on November 18.

=== Metonic ===
- Preceded by: Lunar eclipse of January 31, 2037
- Followed by: Lunar eclipse of September 7, 2044

=== Tzolkinex ===
- Preceded by: Lunar eclipse of October 8, 2033
- Followed by: Lunar eclipse of January 1, 2048

=== Half-Saros ===
- Preceded by: Solar eclipse of November 14, 2031
- Followed by: Solar eclipse of November 25, 2049

=== Tritos ===
- Preceded by: Lunar eclipse of December 20, 2029
- Followed by: Lunar eclipse of October 19, 2051

=== Lunar Saros 136 ===
- Preceded by: Lunar eclipse of November 8, 2022
- Followed by: Lunar eclipse of November 30, 2058

=== Inex ===
- Preceded by: Lunar eclipse of December 10, 2011
- Followed by: Lunar eclipse of October 30, 2069

=== Triad ===
- Preceded by: Lunar eclipse of January 19, 1954
- Followed by: Lunar eclipse of September 20, 2127

=== Lunar eclipses of 2038–2042 ===
This eclipse is a member of a semester series. An eclipse in a semester series of lunar eclipses repeats approximately every 177 days and 4 hours (a semester) at alternating nodes of the Moon's orbit.

The penumbral lunar eclipses on January 21, 2038 and July 16, 2038 occur in the previous lunar year eclipse set, and the penumbral lunar eclipses on April 5, 2042 and September 29, 2042 occur in the next lunar year eclipse set.

Lunar eclipse series sets from 2038 to 2042
Descending node				Ascending node			
Saros	Date Viewing	Type Chart	Gamma	Saros	Date Viewing	Type Chart	Gamma
111	2038 Jun 17	Penumbral	1.3082	116	2038 Dec 11	Penumbral	−1.1448
121	2039 Jun 06	Partial	0.5460	126	2039 Nov 30	Partial	−0.4721
131	2040 May 26	Total	−0.1872	136	2040 Nov 18	Total	0.2361
141	2041 May 16	Partial	−0.9746	146	2041 Nov 08	Partial	0.9212
				156	2042 Oct 28	Penumbral	−

=== Saros 136 ===
This eclipse is a part of Saros series 136, repeating every 18 years, 11 days, and containing 72 events. The series started with a penumbral lunar eclipse on April 13, 1680. It contains partial eclipses from July 11, 1824 through September 14, 1932; total eclipses from September 26, 1950 through July 7, 2419; and a second set of partial eclipses from July 18, 2437 through October 3, 2563. The series ends at member 72 as a penumbral eclipse on June 1, 2960.

The longest duration of totality will be produced by member 35 at 101 minutes, 23 seconds on April 21, 2293. All eclipses in this series occur at the Moon’s ascending node of orbit.

Greatest	First			
The greatest eclipse of the series will occur on 2293 Apr 21, lasting 101 minutes, 23 seconds.	Penumbral	Partial	Total	Central
The greatest eclipse of the series will occur on 2293 Apr 21, lasting 101 minutes, 23 seconds.	1680 Apr 13	1824 Jul 11	1950 Sep 26	2022 Nov 08
The greatest eclipse of the series will occur on 2293 Apr 21, lasting 101 minutes, 23 seconds.	Last			
The greatest eclipse of the series will occur on 2293 Apr 21, lasting 101 minutes, 23 seconds.	Central	Total	Partial	Penumbral
The greatest eclipse of the series will occur on 2293 Apr 21, lasting 101 minutes, 23 seconds.	2365 Jun 04	2419 Jul 07	2563 Oct 03	2960 Jun 01

Eclipses are tabulated in three columns; every third eclipse in the same column is one exeligmos apart, so they all cast shadows over approximately the same parts of the Earth.

Series members 8–29 occur between 1801 and 2200:
8	9	10
1806 Jun 30	1824 Jul 11	1842 Jul 22
11	12	13
1860 Aug 01	1878 Aug 13	1896 Aug 23
14	15	16
1914 Sep 04	1932 Sep 14	1950 Sep 26
17	18	19
1968 Oct 06	1986 Oct 17	2004 Oct 28
20	21	22
2022 Nov 08	2040 Nov 18	2058 Nov 30
23	24	25
2076 Dec 10	2094 Dec 21	2113 Jan 02
26	27	28
2131 Jan 13	2149 Jan 23	2167 Feb 04
29
2185 Feb 14

=== Tritos series ===
This eclipse is a part of a tritos cycle, repeating at alternating nodes every 135 synodic months (≈ 3986.63 days, or 11 years minus 1 month). Their appearance and longitude are irregular due to a lack of synchronization with the anomalistic month (period of perigee), but groupings of 3 tritos cycles (≈ 33 years minus 3 months) come close (≈ 434.044 anomalistic months), so eclipses are similar in these groupings.

Series members between 1801 and 2200
1811 Sep 02 (Saros 115)	1822 Aug 03 (Saros 116)	1833 Jul 02 (Saros 117)	1844 May 31 (Saros 118)	1855 May 02 (Saros 119)
1866 Mar 31 (Saros 120)	1877 Feb 27 (Saros 121)	1888 Jan 28 (Saros 122)	1898 Dec 27 (Saros 123)	1909 Nov 27 (Saros 124)
1920 Oct 27 (Saros 125)	1931 Sep 26 (Saros 126)	1942 Aug 26 (Saros 127)	1953 Jul 26 (Saros 128)	1964 Jun 25 (Saros 129)
1975 May 25 (Saros 130)	1986 Apr 24 (Saros 131)	1997 Mar 24 (Saros 132)	2008 Feb 21 (Saros 133)	2019 Jan 21 (Saros 134)
2029 Dec 20 (Saros 135)	2040 Nov 18 (Saros 136)	2051 Oct 19 (Saros 137)	2062 Sep 18 (Saros 138)	2073 Aug 17 (Saros 139)
2084 Jul 17 (Saros 140)	2095 Jun 17 (Saros 141)	2106 May 17 (Saros 142)	2117 Apr 16 (Saros 143)	2128 Mar 16 (Saros 144)
2139 Feb 13 (Saros 145)	2150 Jan 13 (Saros 146)	2160 Dec 13 (Saros 147)	2171 Nov 12 (Saros 148)	2182 Oct 11 (Saros 149)
2193 Sep 11 (Saros 150)

=== Inex series ===
This eclipse is a part of the long period inex cycle, repeating at alternating nodes, every 358 synodic months (≈ 10,571.95 days, or 29 years minus 20 days). Their appearance and longitude are irregular due to a lack of synchronization with the anomalistic month (period of perigee). However, groupings of 3 inex cycles (≈ 87 years minus 2 months) comes close (≈ 1,151.02 anomalistic months), so eclipses are similar in these groupings.

Series members between 1801 and 2200
1809 Apr 30 (Saros 128)	1838 Apr 10 (Saros 129)	1867 Mar 20 (Saros 130)
1896 Feb 28 (Saros 131)	1925 Feb 08 (Saros 132)	1954 Jan 19 (Saros 133)
1982 Dec 30 (Saros 134)	2011 Dec 10 (Saros 135)	2040 Nov 18 (Saros 136)
2069 Oct 30 (Saros 137)	2098 Oct 10 (Saros 138)	2127 Sep 20 (Saros 139)
2156 Aug 30 (Saros 140)	2185 Aug 11 (Saros 141)	

=== Half-Saros cycle ===
A lunar eclipse will be preceded and followed by solar eclipses by 9 years and 5.5 days (a half saros). This lunar eclipse is related to two annular solar eclipses of Solar Saros 143.

November 14, 2031	November 25, 2049

== See also ==
- List of lunar eclipses and List of 21st-century lunar eclipses
