= 1968 lunar eclipse =

Two total lunar eclipses occurred in 1968:

- 13 April 1968 lunar eclipse
- 6 October 1968 lunar eclipse

== See also ==
- List of 20th-century lunar eclipses
- Lists of lunar eclipses
