= September 1932 lunar eclipse =

Partial lunar eclipse September 14, 1932

- Partial eclipse
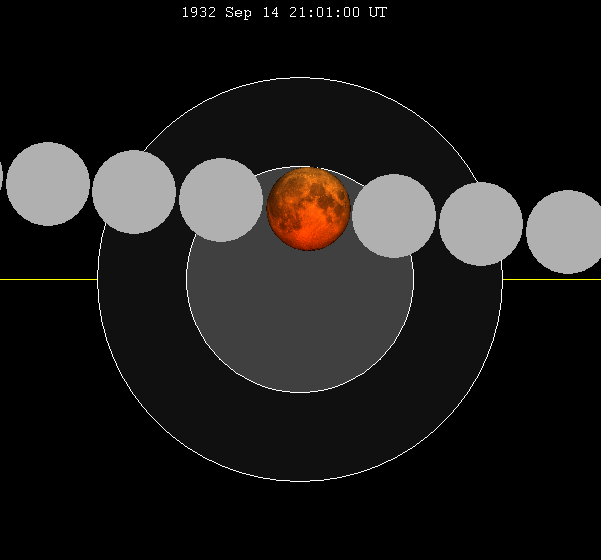
- The Moon's hourly motion shown right to left
- Date: September 14, 1932
- Gamma: 0.4664
- Magnitude: 0.9752
- Saros cycle: 136 (15 of 72)
- Partiality: 203 minutes, 58 seconds
- Penumbral: 347 minutes, 12 seconds
Contacts (UTC)
- P1: 18:07:03
- U1: 19:18:35
- Greatest: 21:00:36
- U4: 22:42:33
- P4: 23:54:15

A partial lunar eclipse occurred at the Moon’s ascending node of orbit on Wednesday, September 14, 1932, with an umbral magnitude of 0.9752. A lunar eclipse occurs when the Moon moves into the Earth's shadow, causing the Moon to be darkened. A partial lunar eclipse occurs when one part of the Moon is in the Earth's umbra, while the other part is in the Earth's penumbra. Unlike a solar eclipse, which can only be viewed from a relatively small area of the world, a lunar eclipse may be viewed from anywhere on the night side of Earth. Occurring about 4.8 days before apogee (on September 19, 1932, at 17:00 UTC), the Moon's apparent diameter was smaller.

This was the last of the first set of partial lunar eclipses in Lunar Saros 136, preceding the first total eclipse on September 26, 1950.

== Visibility ==
The eclipse was completely visible over much of Africa, Europe, and west, central, and south Asia, seen rising over west Africa, South America, and eastern North America and setting over east and northeast Asia and Australia.

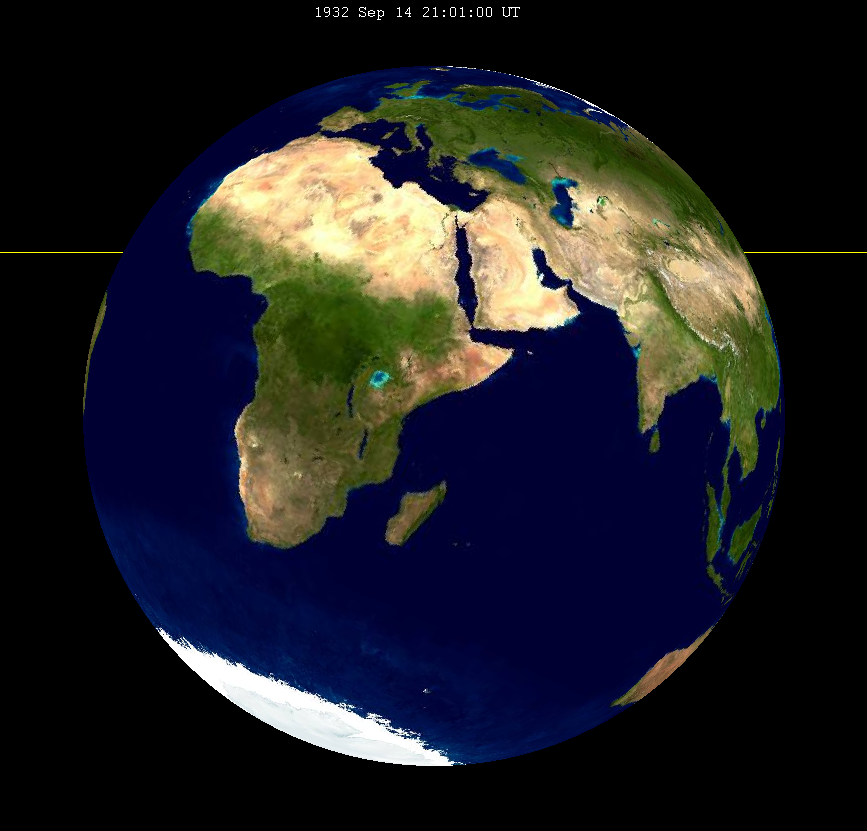
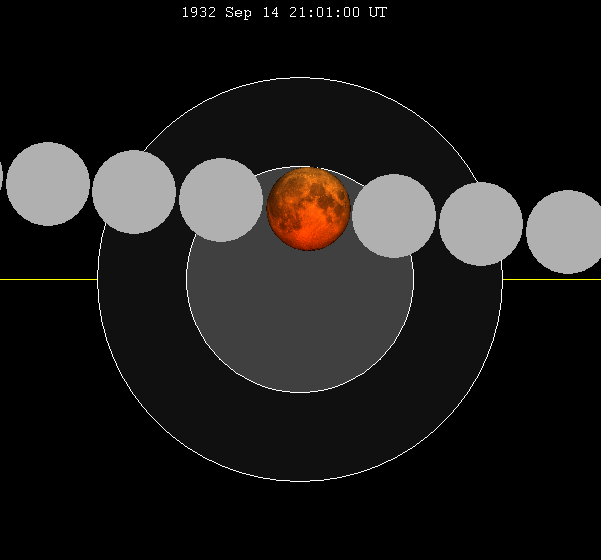

== Eclipse details ==
Shown below is a table displaying details about this particular solar eclipse. It describes various parameters pertaining to this eclipse.

September 14, 1932 Lunar Eclipse Parameters
Parameter	Value
Penumbral Magnitude	2.02964
Umbral Magnitude	0.97519
Gamma	0.46642
Sun Right Ascension	11h29m54.4s
Sun Declination	+03°15'02.3"
Sun Semi-Diameter	15'54.5"
Sun Equatorial Horizontal Parallax	08.7"
Moon Right Ascension	23h29m04.4s
Moon Declination	-02°52'26.5"
Moon Semi-Diameter	15'05.2"
Moon Equatorial Horizontal Parallax	0°55'22.0"
ΔT	23.9 s

== Eclipse season ==
This eclipse is part of an eclipse season, a period, roughly every six months, when eclipses occur. Only two (or occasionally three) eclipse seasons occur each year, and each season lasts about 35 days and repeats just short of six months (173 days) later; thus two full eclipse seasons always occur each year. Either two or three eclipses happen each eclipse season. In the sequence below, each eclipse is separated by a fortnight.

Eclipse season of August–September 1932
August 31 Descending node (new moon)	September 14 Ascending node (full moon)
Total solar eclipse Solar Saros 124	Partial lunar eclipse Lunar Saros 136

== Related eclipses ==
=== Eclipses in 1932 ===
- An annular solar eclipse on March 7.
- A partial lunar eclipse on March 22.
- A total solar eclipse on August 31.
- A partial lunar eclipse on September 14.

=== Metonic ===
- Preceded by: Lunar eclipse of November 27, 1928
- Followed by: Lunar eclipse of July 4, 1936

=== Tzolkinex ===
- Preceded by: Lunar eclipse of August 4, 1925
- Followed by: Lunar eclipse of October 28, 1939

=== Half-Saros ===
- Preceded by: Solar eclipse of September 10, 1923
- Followed by: Solar eclipse of September 21, 1941

=== Tritos ===
- Preceded by: Lunar eclipse of October 16, 1921
- Followed by: Lunar eclipse of August 15, 1943

=== Lunar Saros 136 ===
- Preceded by: Lunar eclipse of September 4, 1914
- Followed by: Lunar eclipse of September 26, 1950

=== Inex ===
- Preceded by: Lunar eclipse of October 6, 1903
- Followed by: Lunar eclipse of August 26, 1961

=== Triad ===
- Preceded by: Lunar eclipse of November 14, 1845
- Followed by: Lunar eclipse of July 16, 2019

=== Lunar eclipses of 1930–1933 ===
This eclipse is a member of a semester series. An eclipse in a semester series of lunar eclipses repeats approximately every 177 days and 4 hours (a semester) at alternating nodes of the Moon's orbit.

The penumbral lunar eclipses on February 10, 1933 and August 5, 1933 occur in the next lunar year eclipse set.

Lunar eclipse series sets from 1930 to 1933
Descending node				Ascending node			
Saros	Date Viewing	Type Chart	Gamma	Saros	Date Viewing	Type Chart	Gamma
111	1930 Apr 13	Partial	0.9545	116	1930 Oct 07	Partial	−0.9812
121	1931 Apr 02	Total	0.2043	126	1931 Sep 26	Total	−0.2698
131	1932 Mar 22	Partial	−0.4956	136	1932 Sep 14	Partial	0.4664
141	1933 Mar 12	Penumbral	−1.2369	146	1933 Sep 04	Penumbral	1.1776

=== Saros 136 ===
This eclipse is a part of Saros series 136, repeating every 18 years, 11 days, and containing 72 events. The series started with a penumbral lunar eclipse on April 13, 1680. It contains partial eclipses from July 11, 1824 through September 14, 1932; total eclipses from September 26, 1950 through July 7, 2419; and a second set of partial eclipses from July 18, 2437 through October 3, 2563. The series ends at member 72 as a penumbral eclipse on June 1, 2960.

The longest duration of totality will be produced by member 35 at 101 minutes, 23 seconds on April 21, 2293. All eclipses in this series occur at the Moon’s ascending node of orbit.

Greatest	First			
The greatest eclipse of the series will occur on 2293 Apr 21, lasting 101 minutes, 23 seconds.	Penumbral	Partial	Total	Central
The greatest eclipse of the series will occur on 2293 Apr 21, lasting 101 minutes, 23 seconds.	1680 Apr 13	1824 Jul 11	1950 Sep 26	2022 Nov 08
The greatest eclipse of the series will occur on 2293 Apr 21, lasting 101 minutes, 23 seconds.	Last			
The greatest eclipse of the series will occur on 2293 Apr 21, lasting 101 minutes, 23 seconds.	Central	Total	Partial	Penumbral
The greatest eclipse of the series will occur on 2293 Apr 21, lasting 101 minutes, 23 seconds.	2365 Jun 04	2419 Jul 07	2563 Oct 03	2960 Jun 01

Eclipses are tabulated in three columns; every third eclipse in the same column is one exeligmos apart, so they all cast shadows over approximately the same parts of the Earth.

Series members 8–29 occur between 1801 and 2200:
8	9	10
1806 Jun 30	1824 Jul 11	1842 Jul 22
11	12	13
1860 Aug 01	1878 Aug 13	1896 Aug 23
14	15	16
1914 Sep 04	1932 Sep 14	1950 Sep 26
17	18	19
1968 Oct 06	1986 Oct 17	2004 Oct 28
20	21	22
2022 Nov 08	2040 Nov 18	2058 Nov 30
23	24	25
2076 Dec 10	2094 Dec 21	2113 Jan 02
26	27	28
2131 Jan 13	2149 Jan 23	2167 Feb 04
29
2185 Feb 14

=== Tritos series ===
This eclipse is a part of a tritos cycle, repeating at alternating nodes every 135 synodic months (≈ 3986.63 days, or 11 years minus 1 month). Their appearance and longitude are irregular due to a lack of synchronization with the anomalistic month (period of perigee), but groupings of 3 tritos cycles (≈ 33 years minus 3 months) come close (≈ 434.044 anomalistic months), so eclipses are similar in these groupings.

Series members between 1801 and 2183
1801 Sep 22 (Saros 124)	1812 Aug 22 (Saros 125)	1823 Jul 23 (Saros 126)	1834 Jun 21 (Saros 127)	1845 May 21 (Saros 128)
1856 Apr 20 (Saros 129)	1867 Mar 20 (Saros 130)	1878 Feb 17 (Saros 131)	1889 Jan 17 (Saros 132)	1899 Dec 17 (Saros 133)
1910 Nov 17 (Saros 134)	1921 Oct 16 (Saros 135)	1932 Sep 14 (Saros 136)	1943 Aug 15 (Saros 137)	1954 Jul 16 (Saros 138)
1965 Jun 14 (Saros 139)	1976 May 13 (Saros 140)	1987 Apr 14 (Saros 141)	1998 Mar 13 (Saros 142)	2009 Feb 09 (Saros 143)
2020 Jan 10 (Saros 144)	2030 Dec 09 (Saros 145)	2041 Nov 08 (Saros 146)	2052 Oct 08 (Saros 147)	2063 Sep 07 (Saros 148)
2074 Aug 07 (Saros 149)	2085 Jul 07 (Saros 150)	2096 Jun 06 (Saros 151)	2107 May 07 (Saros 152)	
		2151 Jan 02 (Saros 156)		2172 Oct 31 (Saros 158)
2183 Oct 01 (Saros 159)

=== Inex series ===
This eclipse is a part of the long period inex cycle, repeating at alternating nodes, every 358 synodic months (≈ 10,571.95 days, or 29 years minus 20 days). Their appearance and longitude are irregular due to a lack of synchronization with the anomalistic month (period of perigee). However, groupings of 3 inex cycles (≈ 87 years minus 2 months) comes close (≈ 1,151.02 anomalistic months), so eclipses are similar in these groupings.

Series members between 1801 and 2200
1816 Dec 04 (Saros 132)	1845 Nov 14 (Saros 133)	1874 Oct 25 (Saros 134)
1903 Oct 06 (Saros 135)	1932 Sep 14 (Saros 136)	1961 Aug 26 (Saros 137)
1990 Aug 06 (Saros 138)	2019 Jul 16 (Saros 139)	2048 Jun 26 (Saros 140)
2077 Jun 06 (Saros 141)	2106 May 17 (Saros 142)	2135 Apr 28 (Saros 143)
2164 Apr 07 (Saros 144)	2193 Mar 17 (Saros 145)	

=== Half-Saros cycle ===
A lunar eclipse will be preceded and followed by solar eclipses by 9 years and 5.5 days (a half saros). This lunar eclipse is related to two total solar eclipses of Solar Saros 143.

September 10, 1923	September 21, 1941

== See also ==
- List of lunar eclipses and List of 21st-century lunar eclipses
