= October 2004 lunar eclipse =

Total lunar eclipse 28 October 2004

- Total eclipse
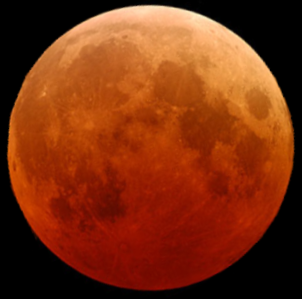
- Totality as viewed from Dunkirk, Maryland at 3:03 UTC, taken by Fred Espenak
- Date: October 28, 2004
- Gamma: 0.2846
- Magnitude: 1.3100
- Saros cycle: 136 (19 of 72)
- Totality: 85 minutes, 29 seconds
- Partiality: 218 minutes, 41 seconds
- Penumbral: 353 minutes, 46 seconds
Contacts (UTC)
- P1: 0:07:17
- U1: 1:14:45
- U2: 2:23:51
- Greatest: 3:04:07
- U3: 3:44:20
- U4: 4:53:26
- P4: 6:01:03

A total lunar eclipse occurred at the Moon’s ascending node of orbit on Thursday, October 28, 2004, with an umbral magnitude of 1.3100. A lunar eclipse occurs when the Moon moves into the Earth's shadow, causing the Moon to be darkened. A total lunar eclipse occurs when the Moon's near side entirely passes into the Earth's umbral shadow. Unlike a solar eclipse, which can only be viewed from a relatively small area of the world, a lunar eclipse may be viewed from anywhere on the night side of Earth. A total lunar eclipse can last up to nearly two hours, while a total solar eclipse lasts only a few minutes at any given place, because the Moon's shadow is smaller. Occurring about 5.4 days before apogee (on November 2, 2004, at 13:10 UTC), the Moon's apparent diameter was smaller.

This lunar eclipse is the last of a tetrad, with four total lunar eclipses in series, the others being on May 16, 2003; November 9, 2003; and May 4, 2004.

== Visibility ==
The eclipse was completely visible over much of North and South America, west Africa, and western Europe, seen rising over western North America and the Pacific Ocean and setting over Africa, eastern Europe, and west Asia.

Hourly motion shown right to left
The Moon's hourly motion across the Earth's shadow in the constellation of Aries.

== Gallery ==
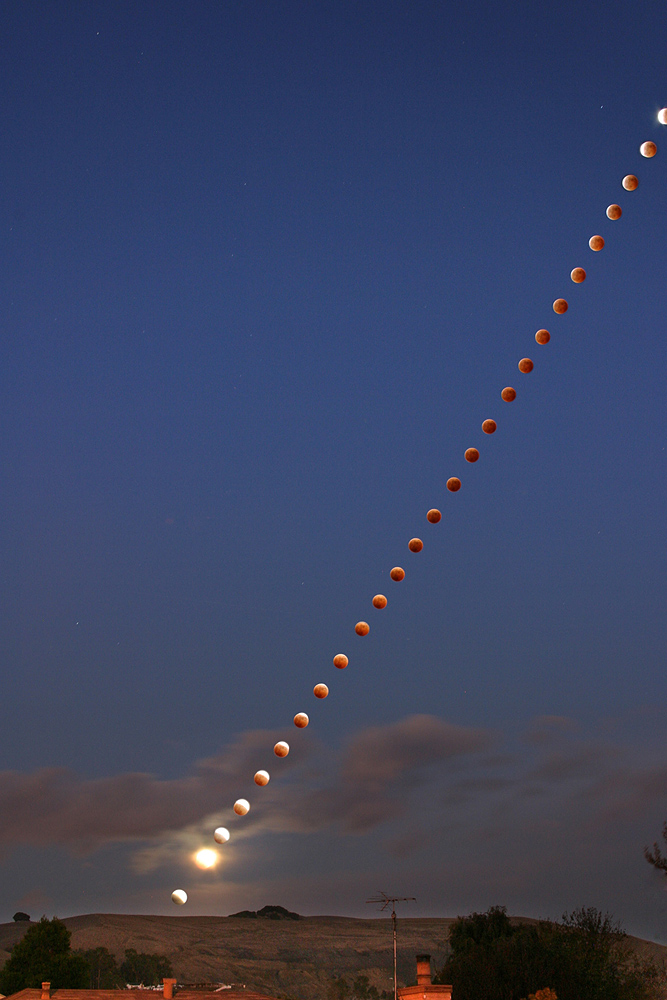
Timelapse photo from Hayward, California

From Mar del Plata, Argentina

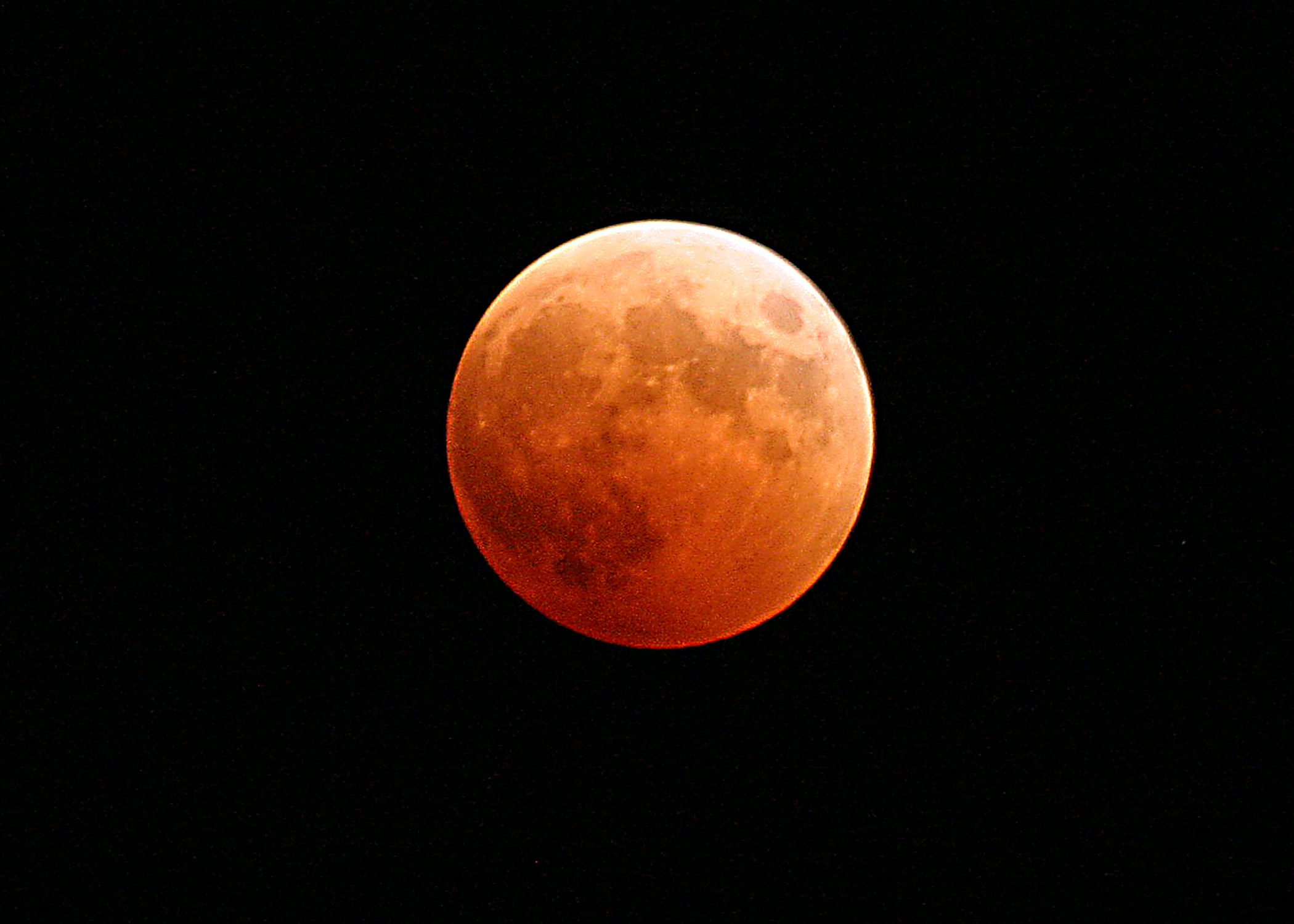
Ault Field, Washington, 2:29 UT

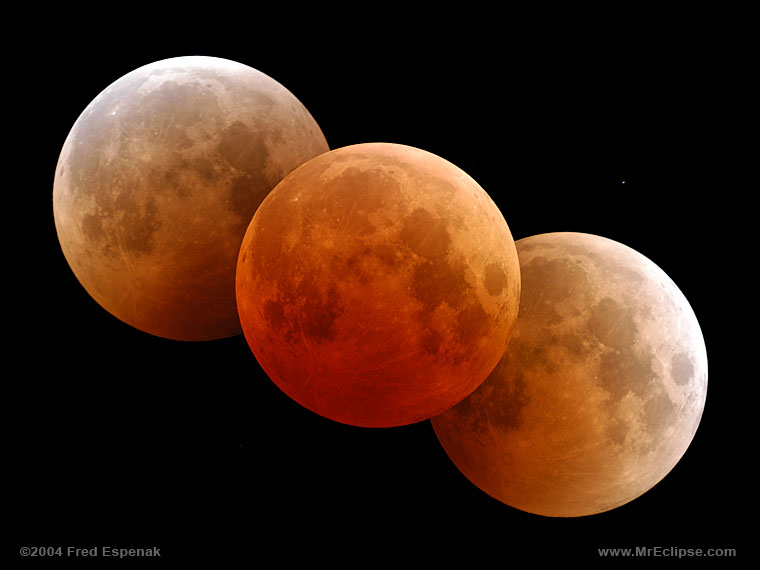
Dunkirk, Maryland, 3:03 UT

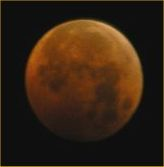
From Kiuruvesi, Finland, 3:21 UT

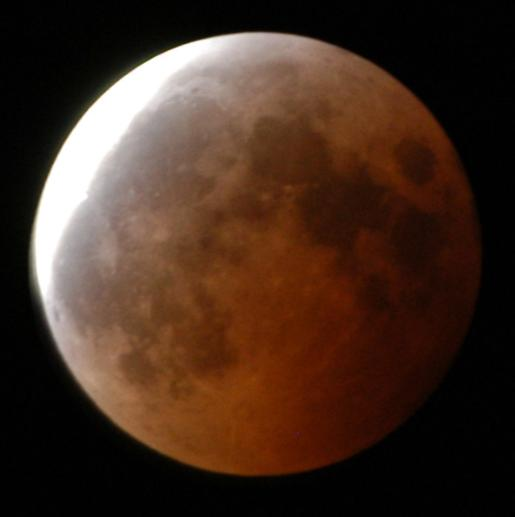
Seattle, Washington
End of totality, 3:43 UT

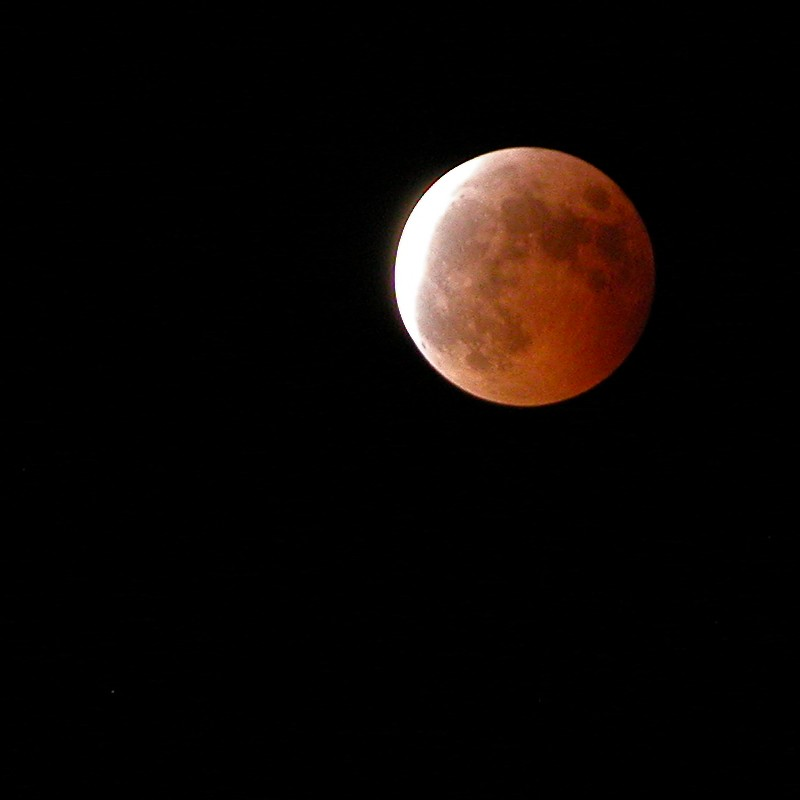
Bellevue, Washington, 3:51 UT

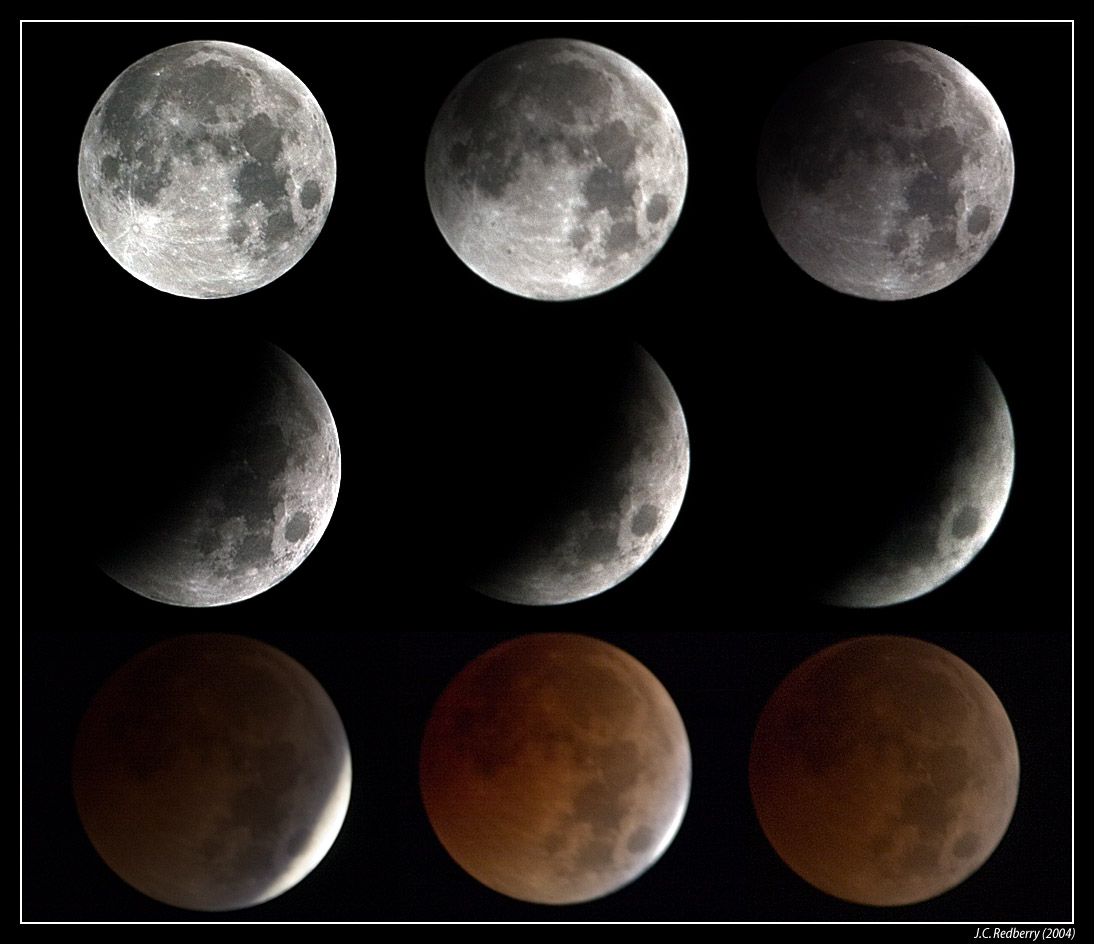
Timelapse photo from A Coruña, Spain

== Eclipse details ==
Shown below is a table displaying details about this particular solar eclipse. It describes various parameters pertaining to this eclipse.

October 28, 2004 Lunar Eclipse Parameters
Parameter	Value
Penumbral Magnitude	2.36560
Umbral Magnitude	1.31001
Gamma	0.28465
Sun Right Ascension	14h11m00.6s
Sun Declination	-13°12'05.3"
Sun Semi-Diameter	16'06.0"
Sun Equatorial Horizontal Parallax	08.9"
Moon Right Ascension	02h10m32.6s
Moon Declination	+13°26'29.6"
Moon Semi-Diameter	15'15.1"
Moon Equatorial Horizontal Parallax	0°55'58.4"
ΔT	64.6 s

== Eclipse season ==
This eclipse is part of an eclipse season, a period, roughly every six months, when eclipses occur. Only two (or occasionally three) eclipse seasons occur each year, and each season lasts about 35 days and repeats just short of six months (173 days) later; thus two full eclipse seasons always occur each year. Either two or three eclipses happen each eclipse season. In the sequence below, each eclipse is separated by a fortnight.

Eclipse season of October 2004
October 14 Descending node (new moon)	October 28 Ascending node (full moon)
Partial solar eclipse Solar Saros 124	Total lunar eclipse Lunar Saros 136

== Related eclipses ==
=== Eclipses in 2004 ===
- A partial solar eclipse on April 19.
- A total lunar eclipse on May 4.
- A partial solar eclipse on October 14.
- A total lunar eclipse on October 28.

=== Metonic ===
- Preceded by: Lunar eclipse of January 9, 2001
- Followed by: Lunar eclipse of August 16, 2008

=== Tzolkinex ===
- Preceded by: Lunar eclipse of September 16, 1997
- Followed by: Lunar eclipse of December 10, 2011

=== Half-Saros ===
- Preceded by: Solar eclipse of October 24, 1995
- Followed by: Solar eclipse of November 3, 2013

=== Tritos ===
- Preceded by: Lunar eclipse of November 29, 1993
- Followed by: Lunar eclipse of September 28, 2015

=== Lunar Saros 136 ===
- Preceded by: Lunar eclipse of October 17, 1986
- Followed by: Lunar eclipse of November 8, 2022

=== Inex ===
- Preceded by: Lunar eclipse of November 18, 1975
- Followed by: Lunar eclipse of October 8, 2033

=== Triad ===
- Preceded by: Lunar eclipse of December 28, 1917
- Followed by: Lunar eclipse of August 29, 2091

=== Lunar eclipses of 2002–2005 ===
This eclipse is a member of a semester series. An eclipse in a semester series of lunar eclipses repeats approximately every 177 days and 4 hours (a semester) at alternating nodes of the Moon's orbit.

The penumbral lunar eclipse on June 24, 2002 occurs in the previous lunar year eclipse set.

Lunar eclipse series sets from 2002 to 2005
Descending node				Ascending node			
Saros	Date Viewing	Type Chart	Gamma	Saros	Date Viewing	Type Chart	Gamma
111	2002 May 26	Penumbral	1.1759	116	2002 Nov 20	Penumbral	−1.1127
121	2003 May 16	Total	0.4123	126	2003 Nov 09	Total	−0.4319
131	2004 May 04	Total	−0.3132	136	2004 Oct 28	Total	0.2846
141	2005 Apr 24	Penumbral	−1.0885	146	2005 Oct 17	Partial	0.9796

=== Metonic series ===
The metonic cycle repeats nearly exactly every 19 years and represents a Saros cycle plus one lunar year. Because it occurs on the same calendar date, the Earth's shadow will in nearly the same location relative to the background stars.

Metonic events: May 4 and October 28
Descending node	Ascending node
1. 1966 May 4 - Penumbral (111); 2. 1985 May 4 - Total (121); 3. 2004 May 4 - Total (131); 4. 2023 May 5 - Penumbral (141)	1. 1966 Oct 29 - Penumbral (116); 2. 1985 Oct 28 - Total (126); 3. 2004 Oct 28 - Total (136); 4. 2023 Oct 28 - Partial (146); 5. 2042 Oct 28 - Penumbral (156)

=== Saros 136 ===
This eclipse is a part of Saros series 136, repeating every 18 years, 11 days, and containing 72 events. The series started with a penumbral lunar eclipse on April 13, 1680. It contains partial eclipses from July 11, 1824 through September 14, 1932; total eclipses from September 26, 1950 through July 7, 2419; and a second set of partial eclipses from July 18, 2437 through October 3, 2563. The series ends at member 72 as a penumbral eclipse on June 1, 2960.

The longest duration of totality will be produced by member 35 at 101 minutes, 23 seconds on April 21, 2293. All eclipses in this series occur at the Moon’s ascending node of orbit.

Greatest	First			
The greatest eclipse of the series will occur on 2293 Apr 21, lasting 101 minutes, 23 seconds.	Penumbral	Partial	Total	Central
The greatest eclipse of the series will occur on 2293 Apr 21, lasting 101 minutes, 23 seconds.	1680 Apr 13	1824 Jul 11	1950 Sep 26	2022 Nov 08
The greatest eclipse of the series will occur on 2293 Apr 21, lasting 101 minutes, 23 seconds.	Last			
The greatest eclipse of the series will occur on 2293 Apr 21, lasting 101 minutes, 23 seconds.	Central	Total	Partial	Penumbral
The greatest eclipse of the series will occur on 2293 Apr 21, lasting 101 minutes, 23 seconds.	2365 Jun 04	2419 Jul 07	2563 Oct 03	2960 Jun 01

Eclipses are tabulated in three columns; every third eclipse in the same column is one exeligmos apart, so they all cast shadows over approximately the same parts of the Earth.

Series members 8–29 occur between 1801 and 2200:
8	9	10
1806 Jun 30	1824 Jul 11	1842 Jul 22
11	12	13
1860 Aug 01	1878 Aug 13	1896 Aug 23
14	15	16
1914 Sep 04	1932 Sep 14	1950 Sep 26
17	18	19
1968 Oct 06	1986 Oct 17	2004 Oct 28
20	21	22
2022 Nov 08	2040 Nov 18	2058 Nov 30
23	24	25
2076 Dec 10	2094 Dec 21	2113 Jan 02
26	27	28
2131 Jan 13	2149 Jan 23	2167 Feb 04
29
2185 Feb 14

=== Tritos series ===
This eclipse is a part of a tritos cycle, repeating at alternating nodes every 135 synodic months (≈ 3986.63 days, or 11 years minus 1 month). Their appearance and longitude are irregular due to a lack of synchronization with the anomalistic month (period of perigee), but groupings of 3 tritos cycles (≈ 33 years minus 3 months) come close (≈ 434.044 anomalistic months), so eclipses are similar in these groupings.

Series members between 1801 and 2200
1808 May 10 (Saros 118)	1819 Apr 10 (Saros 119)	1830 Mar 09 (Saros 120)	1841 Feb 06 (Saros 121)	1852 Jan 07 (Saros 122)
1862 Dec 06 (Saros 123)	1873 Nov 04 (Saros 124)	1884 Oct 04 (Saros 125)	1895 Sep 04 (Saros 126)	1906 Aug 04 (Saros 127)
1917 Jul 04 (Saros 128)	1928 Jun 03 (Saros 129)	1939 May 03 (Saros 130)	1950 Apr 02 (Saros 131)	1961 Mar 02 (Saros 132)
1972 Jan 30 (Saros 133)	1982 Dec 30 (Saros 134)	1993 Nov 29 (Saros 135)	2004 Oct 28 (Saros 136)	2015 Sep 28 (Saros 137)
2026 Aug 28 (Saros 138)	2037 Jul 27 (Saros 139)	2048 Jun 26 (Saros 140)	2059 May 27 (Saros 141)	2070 Apr 25 (Saros 142)
2081 Mar 25 (Saros 143)	2092 Feb 23 (Saros 144)	2103 Jan 23 (Saros 145)	2113 Dec 22 (Saros 146)	2124 Nov 21 (Saros 147)
2135 Oct 22 (Saros 148)	2146 Sep 20 (Saros 149)	2157 Aug 20 (Saros 150)	2168 Jul 20 (Saros 151)	2179 Jun 19 (Saros 152)
2190 May 19 (Saros 153)

=== Inex series ===
This eclipse is a part of the long period inex cycle, repeating at alternating nodes, every 358 synodic months (≈ 10,571.95 days, or 29 years minus 20 days). Their appearance and longitude are irregular due to a lack of synchronization with the anomalistic month (period of perigee). However, groupings of 3 inex cycles (≈ 87 years minus 2 months) comes close (≈ 1,151.02 anomalistic months), so eclipses are similar in these groupings.

Series members between 1801 and 2200
1802 Mar 19 (Saros 129)	1831 Feb 26 (Saros 130)	1860 Feb 07 (Saros 131)
1889 Jan 17 (Saros 132)	1917 Dec 28 (Saros 133)	1946 Dec 08 (Saros 134)
1975 Nov 18 (Saros 135)	2004 Oct 28 (Saros 136)	2033 Oct 08 (Saros 137)
2062 Sep 18 (Saros 138)	2091 Aug 29 (Saros 139)	2120 Aug 09 (Saros 140)
2149 Jul 20 (Saros 141)	2178 Jun 30 (Saros 142)	

=== Half-Saros cycle ===
A lunar eclipse will be preceded and followed by solar eclipses by 9 years and 5.5 days (a half saros). This lunar eclipse is related to two solar eclipses of Solar Saros 143.

October 24, 1995	November 3, 2013

== See also ==
- List of lunar eclipses and List of 21st-century lunar eclipses
- May 2003 lunar eclipse
- November 2003 lunar eclipse
- May 2004 lunar eclipse
