= Ennead (disambiguation) =

The Ennead was a group of nine deities in Egyptian mythology worshipped at Heliopolis.

Ennead ('group of 9') may also refer to:

- Enneads, or The Six Enneads, the collection of writings of the philosopher Plotinus
- The Ennead (novel), by Jan Mark, 1978
- Ennead Architects, an American architectural firm

== See also ==
- 9
- Octad (disambiguation) ('group of 8')
- Decad (disambiguation) ('group of 10')
- Enneagram (disambiguation)
- Enneagon, or nonagon, a nine-sided polygon
- Aeneid, a Latin epic poem by Virgil
  - Eneados, a translation into Middle Scots
