= Heptad =

Heptad ('group of 7') or heptade may refer to:

- Heptad (chord), heptachord in music (set)
- Heptad (computing), a group of 7 bits in computing
- Heptad repeat, a structural motif in proteins
- L'Heptade, an album by Harmonium in 1976
- Sechtae, or "Heptads", an early Irish legal text comprising lists of seven (heptads)

== See also ==
- Hexad (disambiguation) ('group of 6')
- Octad (disambiguation) ('group of 8')
