= Pentad =

Pentad ('group of 5') or pentade may refer to:

- Pentad (chord), a five-note chord
- Pentad (computing), or pentade, a 5-bit group
- a division of the solar term
- Dramatistic pentad, Kenneth Burke's method of analyzing motivation
- Medical pentad, a group of five signs or symptoms which characterise a specific medical condition
- a tuple of length 5

== See also ==
- 5
- Quintet (disambiguation)
- Tetrad (disambiguation) ('group of 4')
- Hexad (disambiguation) ('group of 6')
- Lustrum, a five-year period in Ancient Rome.
- Pentadic numerals
- p-adic number
- Quinary
