= Hexad =

Hexad ('group of 6') or hexade may refer to:

- Hexad (musical formation), or sextet
- Hexad (chord), a six-note series
- Hexad (computing), a 6-bit group

== See also ==
- 6
- Sextet (disambiguation)
- Pentad (disambiguation) ('group of 5')
- Heptad (disambiguation) ('group of 7')
