= Sextet (disambiguation) =

A sextet is a group of six people working together, usually musicians.

Sextet may also refer to:

- Sextet (Penderecki), a 2000 chamber music composition by Krzysztof Penderecki
- Sextet (Poulenc), a 1931/32 chamber music composition by Francis Poulenc
- Sextet (Reich), a 1985 chamber music composition by Steve Reich
- Sextet (Carla Bley album), 1987
- Sextet (A Certain Ratio album), 1982
- Sextet, in computing units of information, a group of 6 bits

== See also ==
- Category:Compositions for string sextet
- Sextet for Horns and String Quartet (Beethoven) (c. 1795)
- Sextette, a 1978 film starring Mae West
- Hexad (disambiguation)
