= Lunar Saros 136 =

Eclipse cycle of the moon

Member 19	Member 20
2004 Oct 28	2022 Nov 08

Saros cycle series 136 for lunar eclipses occurs at the moon's ascending node, 18 years 11 and 1/3 days. It contains 72 events. Solar saros 143 interleaves with this lunar saros with an event occurring every 9 years 5 days alternating between each saros series.

This lunar saros is linked to Solar Saros 143.

== List ==
Cat.	Saros	Mem	Date	Time UT (hr:mn)	Type	Gamma	Magnitude	Duration (min)			Contacts UT (hr:mn)						Chart
Cat.	Saros	Mem	Date	Greatest	Type	Gamma	Magnitude	Pen.	Par.	Tot.	P1	P4	U1	U2	U3	U4	Chart
08864	136	1	1680 Apr 13	23:18:00	Penumbral	1.5494	-1.0254	73.6			22:41:12	23:54:48					
08910	136	2	1698 Apr 25	6:11:31	Penumbral	1.4876	-0.9101	125.8			5:08:37	7:14:25					
08956	136	3	1716 May 6	12:57:42	Penumbral	1.4192	-0.7828	163.7			11:35:51	14:19:33					
09003	136	4	1734 May 17	19:38:11	Penumbral	1.3452	-0.6453	195.0			18:00:41	21:15:41					
09050	136	5	1752 May 28	2:13:58	Penumbral	1.2666	-0.4996	221.9			0:23:01	4:04:55					
09096	136	6	1770 Jun 08	8:45:13	Penumbral	1.1836	-0.3457	245.4			6:42:31	10:47:55					
09141	136	7	1788 Jun 18	15:15:25	Penumbral	1.0985	-0.1883	265.8			13:02:31	17:28:19					
09186	136	8	1806 Jun 30	21:44:38	Penumbral	1.0115	-0.0276	283.6			19:22:50	0:06:26					
09231	136	9	1824 Jul 11	4:14:59	Partial	0.9245	0.1330	298.7	87.6		1:45:38	6:44:20	3:31:11			4:58:47	
09277	136	10	1842 Jul 22	10:47:38	Partial	0.8383	0.2917	311.6	126.5		8:11:50	13:23:26	9:44:23			11:50:53	
09322	136	11	1860 Aug 01	17:25:03	Partial	0.7551	0.4450	322.2	152.3		14:43:57	20:06:09	16:08:54			18:41:12	
09366	136	12	1878 Aug 13	0:08:23	Partial	0.6756	0.5912	330.8	171.1		21:22:59	2:53:47	22:42:50			1:33:56	
09410	136	13	1896 Aug 23	6:57:19	Partial	0.5997	0.7306	337.8	185.4		4:08:25	9:46:13	5:24:37			8:30:01	
09452	136	14	1914 Sep 04	13:54:57	Partial	0.5301	0.8585	343.2	196.0		11:03:21	16:46:33	12:16:57			15:32:57	
09494	136	15	1932 Sep 14	21:01:00	Partial	0.4664	0.9752	347.2	204.0		18:07:24	23:54:36	19:19:00			22:43:00	
09536	136	16	1950 Sep 26	4:17:11	Total	0.4101	1.0783	350.1	209.8	44.3	1:22:08	7:12:14	2:32:17	3:55:02	4:39:20	6:02:05	
09577	136	17	1968 Oct 06	11:42:35	Total	0.3605	1.1691	352.0	213.9	63.0	8:46:35	14:38:35	9:55:38	11:11:05	12:14:05	13:29:32	
09619	136	18	1986 Oct 17	19:18:54	Total	0.3188	1.2455	353.2	216.8	73.7	16:22:18	22:15:30	17:30:30	18:42:03	19:55:45	21:07:18	
09660	136	19	2004 Oct 28	3:05:11	Total	0.2846	1.3081	353.8	218.7	80.5	0:08:17	6:02:05	1:15:50	2:24:56	3:45:26	4:54:32	
09701	136	20	2022 Nov 08	11:00:22	Total	0.2570	1.3589	353.9	219.8	85.0	8:03:25	13:57:19	9:10:28	10:17:52	11:42:52	12:50:16	
09742	136	21	2040 Nov 18	19:04:40	Total	0.2361	1.3974	353.6	220.4	87.8	16:07:52	22:01:28	17:14:28	18:20:46	19:48:34	20:54:52	
09782	136	22	2058 Nov 30	3:16:18	Total	0.2208	1.4260	353.0	220.7	89.7	0:19:48	6:12:48	1:25:57	2:31:27	4:01:09	5:06:39	
09823	136	23	2076 Dec 10	11:34:51	Total	0.2102	1.4460	352.2	220.6	90.8	8:38:45	14:30:57	9:44:33	10:49:27	12:20:15	13:25:09	
09864	136	24	2094 Dec 21	19:56:32	Total	0.2016	1.4627	351.2	220.5	91.6	17:00:56	22:52:08	18:06:17	19:10:44	20:42:20	21:46:47	
09906	136	25	2113 Jan 02	4:22:59	Total	0.1964	1.4735	350.1	220.2	92.1	1:27:56	7:18:02	2:32:53	3:36:56	5:09:02	6:13:05	
09948	136	26	2131 Jan 13	12:49:59	Total	0.1914	1.4842	348.9	219.8	92.5	9:55:32	15:44:26	11:00:05	12:03:44	13:36:14	14:39:53	
09992	136	27	2149 Jan 23	21:17:23	Total	0.1859	1.4962	347.6	219.6	93.0	18:23:35	0:11:11	19:27:35	20:30:53	22:03:53	23:07:11	
10036	136	28	2167 Feb 04	5:41:32	Total	0.1772	1.5143	346.4	219.4	93.8	2:48:20	8:34:44	3:51:50	4:54:38	6:28:26	7:31:14	
10079	136	29	2185 Feb 14	14:03:41	Total	0.1660	1.5372	345.1	219.4	94.8	11:11:08	16:56:14	12:13:59	13:16:17	14:51:05	15:53:23	
10122	136	30	2203 Feb 26	22:20:39	Total	0.1500	1.5692	343.9	219.5	96.1	19:28:42	1:12:36	20:30:54	21:32:36	23:08:42	0:10:24	
10166	136	31	2221 Mar 09	6:32:19	Total	0.1290	1.6106	342.7	219.6	97.5	3:40:58	9:23:40	4:42:31	5:43:34	7:21:04	8:22:07	
10211	136	32	2239 Mar 20	14:37:27	Total	0.1017	1.6635	341.5	219.8	99.1	11:46:42	17:28:12	12:47:33	13:47:54	15:27:00	16:27:21	
10256	136	33	2257 Mar 30	22:36:42	Total	0.0687	1.7272	340.2	220.0	100.4	19:46:36	1:26:48	20:46:42	21:46:30	23:26:54	0:26:42	
10302	136	34	2275 Apr 11	6:28:07	Total	0.0283	1.8043	338.8	219.9	101.3	3:38:43	9:17:31	4:38:10	5:37:28	7:18:46	8:18:04	
10349	136	35	2293 Apr 21	14:13:28	Total	-0.0179	1.8264	337.2	219.5	101.4	11:24:52	17:02:04	12:23:43	13:22:46	15:04:10	16:03:13	
10395	136	36	2311 May 3	21:52:07	Total	-0.0706	1.7326	335.3	218.5	100.3	19:04:28	0:39:46	20:02:52	21:01:58	22:42:16	23:41:22	
10441	136	37	2329 May 14	5:26:11	Total	-0.1279	1.6303	332.9	216.8	97.6	2:39:44	8:12:38	3:37:47	4:37:23	6:14:59	7:14:35	
10487	136	38	2347 May 25	12:53:35	Total	-0.1916	1.5159	330.0	214.2	92.6	10:08:35	15:38:35	11:06:29	12:07:17	13:39:53	14:40:41	
10532	136	39	2365 Jun 04	20:18:36	Total	-0.2581	1.3963	326.5	210.5	84.9	17:35:21	23:01:51	18:33:21	19:36:09	21:01:03	22:03:51	
10577	136	40	2383 Jun 16	3:39:21	Total	-0.3291	1.2682	322.2	205.5	73.0	0:58:15	6:20:27	1:56:36	3:02:51	4:15:51	5:22:06	
10622	136	41	2401 Jun 26	10:59:50	Total	-0.4007	1.1387	317.2	199.2	54.6	8:21:14	13:38:26	9:20:14	10:32:32	11:27:08	12:39:26	
10667	136	42	2419 Jul 07	18:17:23	Total	-0.4754	1.0032	311.4	191.3	8.6	15:41:41	20:53:05	16:41:44	18:13:05	18:21:41	19:53:02	
10711	136	43	2437 Jul 18	1:38:01	Partial	-0.5482	0.8708	305.0	182.0		23:05:31	4:10:31	0:07:01			3:09:01	
10755	136	44	2455 Jul 29	8:58:50	Partial	-0.6217	0.7368	297.7	170.9		6:29:59	11:27:41	7:33:23			10:24:17	
10797	136	45	2473 Aug 08	16:24:06	Partial	-0.6919	0.6087	289.9	158.2		13:59:09	18:49:03	15:05:00			17:43:12	
10838	136	46	2491 Aug 19	23:52:20	Partial	-0.7602	0.4837	281.6	143.5		21:31:32	2:13:08	22:40:35			1:04:05	
10879	136	47	2509 Aug 31	7:27:37	Partial	-0.8231	0.3684	273.2	127.1		5:11:01	9:44:13	6:24:04			8:31:10	
10919	136	48	2527 Sep 11	15:08:19	Partial	-0.8822	0.2599	264.5	108.3		12:56:04	17:20:34	14:14:10			16:02:28	
10960	136	49	2545 Sep 21	22:55:50	Partial	-0.9362	0.1604	255.9	86.1		20:47:53	1:03:47	22:12:47			23:38:53	
11002	136	50	2563 Oct 03	6:51:07	Partial	-0.9842	0.0718	247.7	58.2		4:47:16	8:54:58	6:22:01			7:20:13	
11043	136	51	2581 Oct 13	14:54:30	Penumbral	-1.0259	-0.0054	240.1			12:54:27	16:54:33					
11083	136	52	2599 Oct 24	23:06:08	Penumbral	-1.0614	-0.0711	233.2			21:09:32	1:02:44					
11123	136	53	2617 Nov 05	7:25:07	Penumbral	-1.0911	-0.1265	227.2			5:31:31	9:18:43					
11163	136	54	2635 Nov 16	15:52:29	Penumbral	-1.1144	-0.1700	222.2			14:01:23	17:43:35					
11204	136	55	2653 Nov 27	0:26:25	Penumbral	-1.1326	-0.2042	218.2			22:37:19	2:15:31					
11246	136	56	2671 Dec 08	9:06:19	Penumbral	-1.1461	-0.2295	215.1			7:18:46	10:53:52					
11289	136	57	2689 Dec 18	17:51:16	Penumbral	-1.1558	-0.2479	212.9			16:04:49	19:37:43					
11332	136	58	2707 Dec 31	2:40:18	Penumbral	-1.1623	-0.2601	211.4			0:54:36	4:26:00					
11374	136	59	2726 Jan 10	11:31:30	Penumbral	-1.1674	-0.2695	210.1			9:46:27	13:16:33					
11416	136	60	2744 Jan 21	20:23:11	Penumbral	-1.1723	-0.2785	208.9			18:38:44	22:07:38					
11460	136	61	2762 Feb 01	5:14:43	Penumbral	-1.1775	-0.2877	207.6			3:30:55	6:58:31					
11504	136	62	2780 Feb 12	14:04:32	Penumbral	-1.1840	-0.2993	205.9			12:21:35	15:47:29					
11550	136	63	2798 Feb 22	22:50:07	Penumbral	-1.1945	-0.3178	203.2			21:08:31	0:31:43					
11596	136	64	2816 Mar 05	7:31:10	Penumbral	-1.2087	-0.3431	199.5			5:51:25	9:10:55					
11644	136	65	2834 Mar 16	16:06:06	Penumbral	-1.2281	-0.3778	194.3			14:28:57	17:43:15					
11690	136	66	2852 Mar 27	0:35:12	Penumbral	-1.2522	-0.4211	187.5			23:01:27	2:08:57					
11736	136	67	2870 Apr 07	8:55:29	Penumbral	-1.2835	-0.4775	178.2			7:26:23	10:24:35					
11782	136	68	2888 Apr 17	17:09:16	Penumbral	-1.3200	-0.5436	166.4			15:46:04	18:32:28					
11828	136	69	2906 Apr 30	1:14:13	Penumbral	-1.3639	-0.6232	150.4			23:59:01	2:29:25					
11873	136	70	2924 May 10	9:12:12	Penumbral	-1.4130	-0.7126	129.5			8:07:27	10:16:57					
11918	136	71	2942 May 21	17:01:36	Penumbral	-1.4688	-0.8146	99.3			16:11:57	17:51:15					
11964	136	72	2960 Jun 01	0:45:28	Penumbral	-1.5287	-0.9242	46.1			0:22:25	1:08:31					

== See also ==
- List of lunar eclipses
  - List of Saros series for lunar eclipses
