= Octad =

Octad ('group of 8') or octade may refer to:

- Octad (chord), octachord in music theory
- Octad (computing), a group of 8 bits in computing
- Octad (biology), an ascus containing eight ascospores

== See also ==
- Heptad (disambiguation) ('group of 7')
- Ennead (disambiguation) ('group of 9')
