= October 1968 lunar eclipse =

Total lunar eclipse October 6, 1968

- Total eclipse
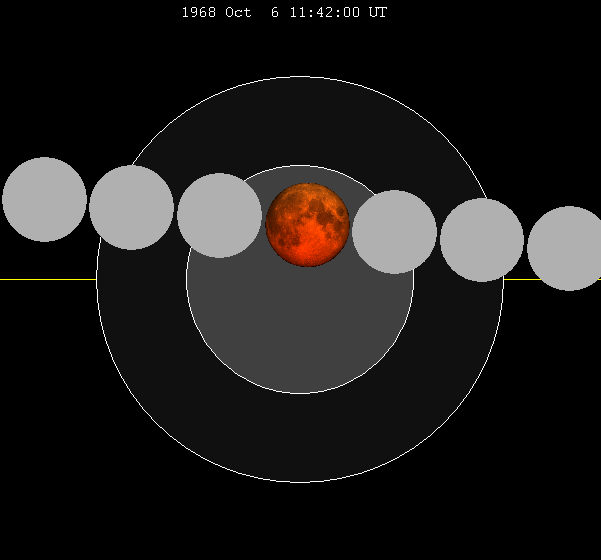
- The Moon's hourly motion shown right to left
- Date: October 6, 1968
- Gamma: 0.3605
- Magnitude: 1.1691
- Saros cycle: 136 (17 of 72)
- Totality: 62 minutes, 58 seconds
- Partiality: 213 minutes, 56 seconds
- Penumbral: 352 minutes, 2 seconds
Contacts (UTC)
- P1: 8:45:58
- U1: 9:54:56
- U2: 11:10:26
- Greatest: 11:41:56
- U3: 12:13:24
- U4: 13:28:53
- P4: 14:38:00

A total lunar eclipse occurred at the Moon’s ascending node of orbit on Sunday, October 6, 1968, with an umbral magnitude of 1.1691. A lunar eclipse occurs when the Moon moves into the Earth's shadow, causing the Moon to be darkened. A total lunar eclipse occurs when the Moon's near side entirely passes into the Earth's umbral shadow. Unlike a solar eclipse, which can only be viewed from a relatively small area of the world, a lunar eclipse may be viewed from anywhere on the night side of Earth. A total lunar eclipse can last up to nearly two hours, while a total solar eclipse lasts only a few minutes at any given place, because the Moon's shadow is smaller. Occurring about 5.3 days before apogee (on October 11, 1968, at 18:05 UTC), the Moon's apparent diameter was smaller.

This lunar eclipse was the last of a tetrad, with four total lunar eclipses in series, the others being on April 24, 1967; October 18, 1967; and April 13, 1968.

== Visibility ==
The eclipse was completely visible over northeast Asia, eastern Australia, northwestern North America and much of the Pacific Ocean, seen rising over most of Asia and western Australia and setting over North and South America.

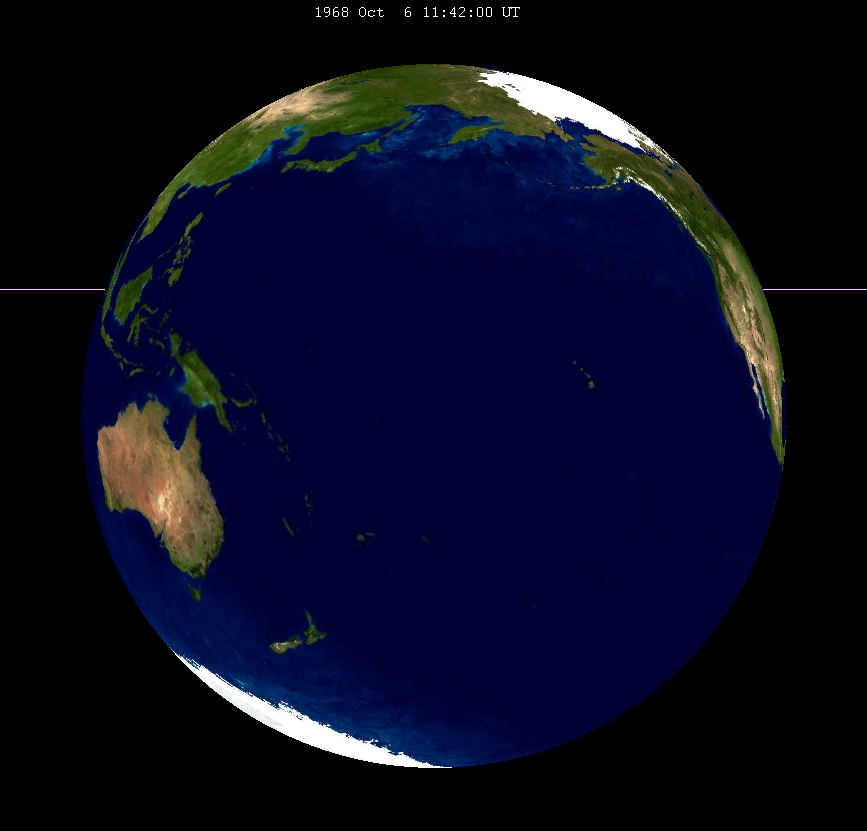
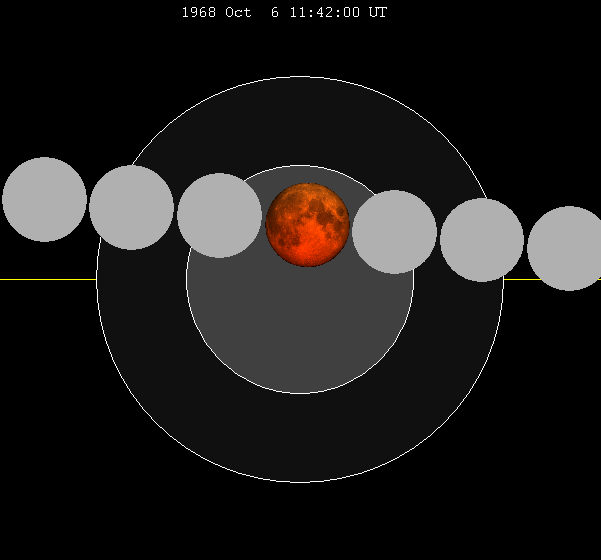

== Eclipse details ==
Shown below is a table displaying details about this particular solar eclipse. It describes various parameters pertaining to this eclipse.

October 6, 1968 Lunar Eclipse Parameters
Parameter	Value
Penumbral Magnitude	2.22423
Umbral Magnitude	1.16913
Gamma	0.36054
Sun Right Ascension	12h48m51.9s
Sun Declination	-05°14'36.0"
Sun Semi-Diameter	16'00.2"
Sun Equatorial Horizontal Parallax	08.8"
Moon Right Ascension	00h48m13.3s
Moon Declination	+05°32'13.0"
Moon Semi-Diameter	15'10.1"
Moon Equatorial Horizontal Parallax	0°55'39.9"
ΔT	39.0 s

== Eclipse season ==
This eclipse is part of an eclipse season, a period, roughly every six months, when eclipses occur. Only two (or occasionally three) eclipse seasons occur each year, and each season lasts about 35 days and repeats just short of six months (173 days) later; thus two full eclipse seasons always occur each year. Either two or three eclipses happen each eclipse season. In the sequence below, each eclipse is separated by a fortnight.

Eclipse season of September–October 1968
September 22 Descending node (new moon)	October 6 Ascending node (full moon)
Total solar eclipse Solar Saros 124	Total lunar eclipse Lunar Saros 136

== Related eclipses ==
=== Eclipses in 1968 ===
- A partial solar eclipse on March 28.
- A total lunar eclipse on April 13.
- A total solar eclipse on September 22.
- A total lunar eclipse on October 6.

=== Metonic ===
- Preceded by: Lunar eclipse of December 19, 1964
- Followed by: Lunar eclipse of July 26, 1972

=== Tzolkinex ===
- Preceded by: Lunar eclipse of August 26, 1961
- Followed by: Lunar eclipse of November 18, 1975

=== Half-Saros ===
- Preceded by: Solar eclipse of October 2, 1959
- Followed by: Solar eclipse of October 12, 1977

=== Tritos ===
- Preceded by: Lunar eclipse of November 7, 1957
- Followed by: Lunar eclipse of September 6, 1979

=== Lunar Saros 136 ===
- Preceded by: Lunar eclipse of September 26, 1950
- Followed by: Lunar eclipse of October 17, 1986

=== Inex ===
- Preceded by: Lunar eclipse of October 28, 1939
- Followed by: Lunar eclipse of September 16, 1997

=== Triad ===
- Preceded by: Lunar eclipse of December 5, 1881
- Followed by: Lunar eclipse of August 7, 2055

=== Lunar eclipses of 1966–1969 ===
This eclipse is a member of a semester series. An eclipse in a semester series of lunar eclipses repeats approximately every 177 days and 4 hours (a semester) at alternating nodes of the Moon's orbit.

The penumbral lunar eclipse on August 27, 1969 occurs in the next lunar year eclipse set.

Lunar eclipse series sets from 1966 to 1969
Descending node				Ascending node			
Saros	Date Viewing	Type Chart	Gamma	Saros	Date Viewing	Type Chart	Gamma
111	1966 May 04	Penumbral	1.0554	116	1966 Oct 29	Penumbral	−1.0600
121	1967 Apr 24	Total	0.2972	126	1967 Oct 18	Total	−0.3653
131	1968 Apr 13	Total	−0.4173	136	1968 Oct 06	Total	0.3605
141	1969 Apr 02	Penumbral	−1.1765	146	1969 Sep 25	Penumbral	1.0656

=== Saros 136 ===
This eclipse is a part of Saros series 136, repeating every 18 years, 11 days, and containing 72 events. The series started with a penumbral lunar eclipse on April 13, 1680. It contains partial eclipses from July 11, 1824 through September 14, 1932; total eclipses from September 26, 1950 through July 7, 2419; and a second set of partial eclipses from July 18, 2437 through October 3, 2563. The series ends at member 72 as a penumbral eclipse on June 1, 2960.

The longest duration of totality will be produced by member 35 at 101 minutes, 23 seconds on April 21, 2293. All eclipses in this series occur at the Moon’s ascending node of orbit.

Greatest	First			
The greatest eclipse of the series will occur on 2293 Apr 21, lasting 101 minutes, 23 seconds.	Penumbral	Partial	Total	Central
The greatest eclipse of the series will occur on 2293 Apr 21, lasting 101 minutes, 23 seconds.	1680 Apr 13	1824 Jul 11	1950 Sep 26	2022 Nov 08
The greatest eclipse of the series will occur on 2293 Apr 21, lasting 101 minutes, 23 seconds.	Last			
The greatest eclipse of the series will occur on 2293 Apr 21, lasting 101 minutes, 23 seconds.	Central	Total	Partial	Penumbral
The greatest eclipse of the series will occur on 2293 Apr 21, lasting 101 minutes, 23 seconds.	2365 Jun 04	2419 Jul 07	2563 Oct 03	2960 Jun 01

Eclipses are tabulated in three columns; every third eclipse in the same column is one exeligmos apart, so they all cast shadows over approximately the same parts of the Earth.

Series members 8–29 occur between 1801 and 2200:
8	9	10
1806 Jun 30	1824 Jul 11	1842 Jul 22
11	12	13
1860 Aug 01	1878 Aug 13	1896 Aug 23
14	15	16
1914 Sep 04	1932 Sep 14	1950 Sep 26
17	18	19
1968 Oct 06	1986 Oct 17	2004 Oct 28
20	21	22
2022 Nov 08	2040 Nov 18	2058 Nov 30
23	24	25
2076 Dec 10	2094 Dec 21	2113 Jan 02
26	27	28
2131 Jan 13	2149 Jan 23	2167 Feb 04
29
2185 Feb 14

=== Tritos series ===
This eclipse is a part of a tritos cycle, repeating at alternating nodes every 135 synodic months (≈ 3986.63 days, or 11 years minus 1 month). Their appearance and longitude are irregular due to a lack of synchronization with the anomalistic month (period of perigee), but groupings of 3 tritos cycles (≈ 33 years minus 3 months) come close (≈ 434.044 anomalistic months), so eclipses are similar in these groupings.

Series members between 1801 and 2187
1805 Jan 15 (Saros 121)	1815 Dec 16 (Saros 122)	1826 Nov 14 (Saros 123)	1837 Oct 13 (Saros 124)	1848 Sep 13 (Saros 125)
1859 Aug 13 (Saros 126)	1870 Jul 12 (Saros 127)	1881 Jun 12 (Saros 128)	1892 May 11 (Saros 129)	1903 Apr 12 (Saros 130)
1914 Mar 12 (Saros 131)	1925 Feb 08 (Saros 132)	1936 Jan 08 (Saros 133)	1946 Dec 08 (Saros 134)	1957 Nov 07 (Saros 135)
1968 Oct 06 (Saros 136)	1979 Sep 06 (Saros 137)	1990 Aug 06 (Saros 138)	2001 Jul 05 (Saros 139)	2012 Jun 04 (Saros 140)
2023 May 05 (Saros 141)	2034 Apr 03 (Saros 142)	2045 Mar 03 (Saros 143)	2056 Feb 01 (Saros 144)	2066 Dec 31 (Saros 145)
2077 Nov 29 (Saros 146)	2088 Oct 30 (Saros 147)	2099 Sep 29 (Saros 148)	2110 Aug 29 (Saros 149)	2121 Jul 30 (Saros 150)
2132 Jun 28 (Saros 151)	2143 May 28 (Saros 152)	2154 Apr 28 (Saros 153)		
2187 Jan 24 (Saros 156)

=== Inex series ===
This eclipse is a part of the long period inex cycle, repeating at alternating nodes, every 358 synodic months (≈ 10,571.95 days, or 29 years minus 20 days). Their appearance and longitude are irregular due to a lack of synchronization with the anomalistic month (period of perigee). However, groupings of 3 inex cycles (≈ 87 years minus 2 months) comes close (≈ 1,151.02 anomalistic months), so eclipses are similar in these groupings.

Series members between 1801 and 2200
1824 Jan 16 (Saros 131)	1852 Dec 26 (Saros 132)	1881 Dec 05 (Saros 133)
1910 Nov 17 (Saros 134)	1939 Oct 28 (Saros 135)	1968 Oct 06 (Saros 136)
1997 Sep 16 (Saros 137)	2026 Aug 28 (Saros 138)	2055 Aug 07 (Saros 139)
2084 Jul 17 (Saros 140)	2113 Jun 29 (Saros 141)	2142 Jun 08 (Saros 142)
2171 May 19 (Saros 143)	2200 Apr 30 (Saros 144)	

=== Half-Saros cycle ===
A lunar eclipse will be preceded and followed by solar eclipses by 9 years and 5.5 days (a half saros). This lunar eclipse is related to two total solar eclipses of Solar Saros 143.

October 2, 1959	October 12, 1977

== See also ==
- List of lunar eclipses
- List of 20th-century lunar eclipses
