= October 1986 lunar eclipse =

Astronomical event

- Total eclipse
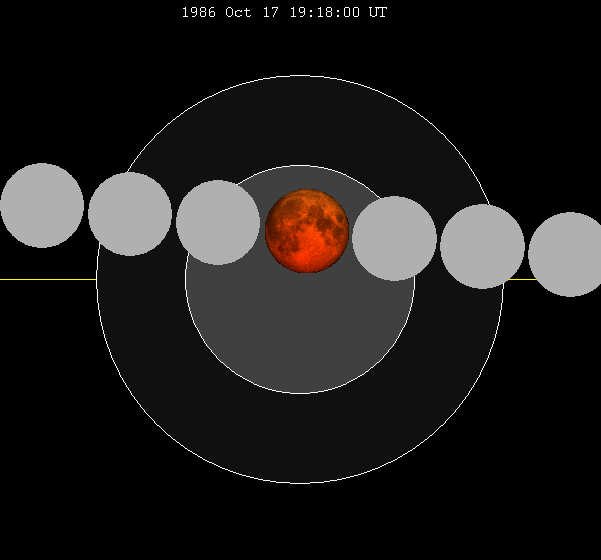
- The Moon's hourly motion shown right to left
- Date: October 17, 1986
- Gamma: 0.3189
- Magnitude: 1.2455
- Saros cycle: 136 (18 of 72)
- Totality: 73 minutes, 41 seconds
- Partiality: 216 minutes, 48 seconds
- Penumbral: 353 minutes, 12 seconds
Contacts (UTC)
- P1: 16:21:26
- U1: 17:29:33
- U2: 18:41:07
- Greatest: 19:17:59
- U3: 19:54:48
- U4: 21:06:22
- P4: 22:14:38

A total lunar eclipse occurred at the Moon’s ascending node of orbit on Friday, October 17, 1986, with an umbral magnitude of 1.2455. A lunar eclipse occurs when the Moon moves into the Earth's shadow, causing the Moon to be darkened. A total lunar eclipse occurs when the Moon's near side entirely passes into the Earth's umbral shadow. Unlike a solar eclipse, which can only be viewed from a relatively small area of the world, a lunar eclipse may be viewed from anywhere on the night side of Earth. A total lunar eclipse can last up to nearly two hours, while a total solar eclipse lasts only a few minutes at any given place, because the Moon's shadow is smaller. Occurring about 5.5 days before apogee (on October 23, 1986, at 6:35 UTC), the Moon's apparent diameter was smaller.

This lunar eclipse was the last of a tetrad, with four total lunar eclipses in series, the others being on May 4, 1985; October 28, 1985; and April 24, 1986.

== Visibility ==
The eclipse was completely visible over east Africa, eastern Europe, and Asia, seen rising over northeastern North America, eastern South America, western Europe, and west Africa and setting over Australia, northeast Asia, and the western Pacific Ocean.

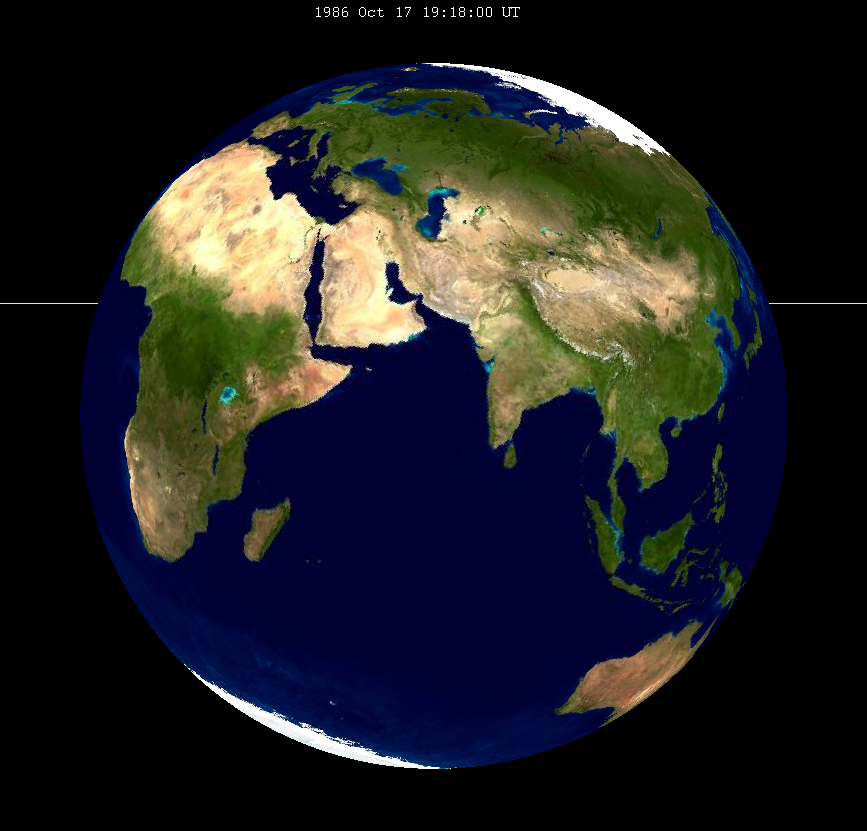
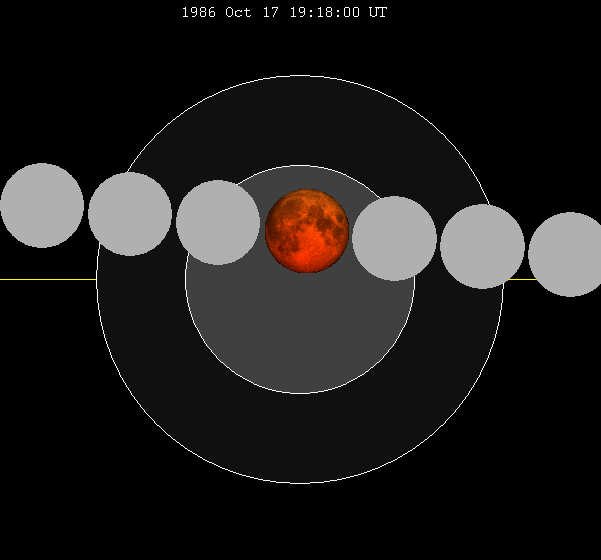

== Eclipse details ==
Shown below is a table displaying details about this particular lunar eclipse. It describes various parameters pertaining to this eclipse.

October 17, 1986 Lunar Eclipse Parameters
Parameter	Value
Penumbral Magnitude	2.30082
Umbral Magnitude	1.24545
Gamma	0.31887
Sun Right Ascension	13h29m20.1s
Sun Declination	-09°21'26.2"
Sun Semi-Diameter	16'03.1"
Sun Equatorial Horizontal Parallax	08.8"
Moon Right Ascension	01h28m47.0s
Moon Declination	+09°37'14.9"
Moon Semi-Diameter	15'12.6"
Moon Equatorial Horizontal Parallax	0°55'49.1"
ΔT	55.2 s

== Eclipse season ==
This eclipse is part of an eclipse season, a period, roughly every six months, when eclipses occur. Only two (or occasionally three) eclipse seasons occur each year, and each season lasts about 35 days and repeats just short of six months (173 days) later; thus two full eclipse seasons always occur each year. Either two or three eclipses happen each eclipse season. In the sequence below, each eclipse is separated by a fortnight.

Eclipse season of October 1986
October 3 Descending node (new moon)	October 17 Ascending node (full moon)
Hybrid solar eclipse Solar Saros 124	Total lunar eclipse Lunar Saros 136

== Related eclipses ==
=== Eclipses in 1986 ===
- A partial solar eclipse on April 9.
- A total lunar eclipse on April 24.
- A hybrid solar eclipse on October 3.
- A total lunar eclipse on October 17.

=== Metonic ===
- Preceded by: Lunar eclipse of December 30, 1982
- Followed by: Lunar eclipse of August 6, 1990

=== Tzolkinex ===
- Preceded by: Lunar eclipse of September 6, 1979
- Followed by: Lunar eclipse of November 29, 1993

=== Half-Saros ===
- Preceded by: Solar eclipse of October 12, 1977
- Followed by: Solar eclipse of October 24, 1995

=== Tritos ===
- Preceded by: Lunar eclipse of November 18, 1975
- Followed by: Lunar eclipse of September 16, 1997

=== Lunar Saros 136 ===
- Preceded by: Lunar eclipse of October 6, 1968
- Followed by: Lunar eclipse of October 28, 2004

=== Inex ===
- Preceded by: Lunar eclipse of November 7, 1957
- Followed by: Lunar eclipse of September 28, 2015

=== Triad ===
- Preceded by: Lunar eclipse of December 17, 1899
- Followed by: Lunar eclipse of August 17, 2073

=== Lunar eclipses of 1984–1987 ===
This eclipse is a member of a semester series. An eclipse in a semester series of lunar eclipses repeats approximately every 177 days and 4 hours (a semester) at alternating nodes of the Moon's orbit.

The penumbral lunar eclipse on June 13, 1984 occurs in the previous lunar year eclipse set.

Lunar eclipse series sets from 1984 to 1987
Descending node				Ascending node			
Saros	Date Viewing	Type Chart	Gamma	Saros	Date Viewing	Type Chart	Gamma
111	1984 May 15	Penumbral	1.1131	116	1984 Nov 08	Penumbral	−1.0900
121	1985 May 04	Total	0.3520	126	1985 Oct 28	Total	−0.4022
131	1986 Apr 24	Total	−0.3683	136	1986 Oct 17	Total	0.3189
141	1987 Apr 14	Penumbral	−1.1364	146	1987 Oct 07	Penumbral	1.0189

=== Metonic series ===
The Metonic cycle repeats nearly exactly every 19 years and represents a Saros cycle plus one lunar year. Because it occurs on the same calendar date, the Earth's shadow will in nearly the same location relative to the background stars.

Metonic lunar eclipse sets 1948–2005
Descending node			Ascending node		
Saros	Date	Type	Saros	Date	Type
111	1948 Apr 23	Partial	116	1948 Oct 18	Penumbral
121	1967 Apr 24	Total	126	1967 Oct 18	Total
131	1986 Apr 24	Total	136	1986 Oct 17	Total
141	2005 Apr 24	Penumbral	146	2005 Oct 17	Partial

=== Saros 136 ===
This eclipse is a part of Saros series 136, repeating every 18 years, 11 days, and containing 72 events. The series started with a penumbral lunar eclipse on April 13, 1680. It contains partial eclipses from July 11, 1824 through September 14, 1932; total eclipses from September 26, 1950 through July 7, 2419; and a second set of partial eclipses from July 18, 2437 through October 3, 2563. The series ends at member 72 as a penumbral eclipse on June 1, 2960.

The longest duration of totality will be produced by member 35 at 101 minutes, 23 seconds on April 21, 2293. All eclipses in this series occur at the Moon’s ascending node of orbit.

Greatest	First			
The greatest eclipse of the series will occur on 2293 Apr 21, lasting 101 minutes, 23 seconds.	Penumbral	Partial	Total	Central
The greatest eclipse of the series will occur on 2293 Apr 21, lasting 101 minutes, 23 seconds.	1680 Apr 13	1824 Jul 11	1950 Sep 26	2022 Nov 08
The greatest eclipse of the series will occur on 2293 Apr 21, lasting 101 minutes, 23 seconds.	Last			
The greatest eclipse of the series will occur on 2293 Apr 21, lasting 101 minutes, 23 seconds.	Central	Total	Partial	Penumbral
The greatest eclipse of the series will occur on 2293 Apr 21, lasting 101 minutes, 23 seconds.	2365 Jun 04	2419 Jul 07	2563 Oct 03	2960 Jun 01

Eclipses are tabulated in three columns; every third eclipse in the same column is one exeligmos apart, so they all cast shadows over approximately the same parts of the Earth.

Series members 8–29 occur between 1801 and 2200:
8	9	10
1806 Jun 30	1824 Jul 11	1842 Jul 22
11	12	13
1860 Aug 01	1878 Aug 13	1896 Aug 23
14	15	16
1914 Sep 04	1932 Sep 14	1950 Sep 26
17	18	19
1968 Oct 06	1986 Oct 17	2004 Oct 28
20	21	22
2022 Nov 08	2040 Nov 18	2058 Nov 30
23	24	25
2076 Dec 10	2094 Dec 21	2113 Jan 02
26	27	28
2131 Jan 13	2149 Jan 23	2167 Feb 04
29
2185 Feb 14

=== Tritos series ===
This eclipse is a part of a tritos cycle, repeating at alternating nodes every 135 synodic months (≈ 3986.63 days, or 11 years minus 1 month). Their appearance and longitude are irregular due to a lack of synchronization with the anomalistic month (period of perigee), but groupings of 3 tritos cycles (≈ 33 years minus 3 months) come close (≈ 434.044 anomalistic months), so eclipses are similar in these groupings.

Series members between 1801 and 2200
1801 Mar 30 (Saros 119)	1812 Feb 27 (Saros 120)	1823 Jan 26 (Saros 121)	1833 Dec 26 (Saros 122)	1844 Nov 24 (Saros 123)
1855 Oct 25 (Saros 124)	1866 Sep 24 (Saros 125)	1877 Aug 23 (Saros 126)	1888 Jul 23 (Saros 127)	1899 Jun 23 (Saros 128)
1910 May 24 (Saros 129)	1921 Apr 22 (Saros 130)	1932 Mar 22 (Saros 131)	1943 Feb 20 (Saros 132)	1954 Jan 19 (Saros 133)
1964 Dec 19 (Saros 134)	1975 Nov 18 (Saros 135)	1986 Oct 17 (Saros 136)	1997 Sep 16 (Saros 137)	2008 Aug 16 (Saros 138)
2019 Jul 16 (Saros 139)	2030 Jun 15 (Saros 140)	2041 May 16 (Saros 141)	2052 Apr 14 (Saros 142)	2063 Mar 14 (Saros 143)
2074 Feb 11 (Saros 144)	2085 Jan 10 (Saros 145)	2095 Dec 11 (Saros 146)	2106 Nov 11 (Saros 147)	2117 Oct 10 (Saros 148)
2128 Sep 09 (Saros 149)	2139 Aug 10 (Saros 150)	2150 Jul 09 (Saros 151)	2161 Jun 08 (Saros 152)	2172 May 08 (Saros 153)
	2194 Mar 07 (Saros 155)			

=== Inex series ===
This eclipse is a part of the long period inex cycle, repeating at alternating nodes, every 358 synodic months (≈ 10,571.95 days, or 29 years minus 20 days). Their appearance and longitude are irregular due to a lack of synchronization with the anomalistic month (period of perigee). However, groupings of 3 inex cycles (≈ 87 years minus 2 months) comes close (≈ 1,151.02 anomalistic months), so eclipses are similar in these groupings.

Series members between 1801 and 2200
1813 Feb 15 (Saros 130)	1842 Jan 26 (Saros 131)	1871 Jan 06 (Saros 132)
1899 Dec 17 (Saros 133)	1928 Nov 27 (Saros 134)	1957 Nov 07 (Saros 135)
1986 Oct 17 (Saros 136)	2015 Sep 28 (Saros 137)	2044 Sep 07 (Saros 138)
2073 Aug 17 (Saros 139)	2102 Jul 30 (Saros 140)	2131 Jul 10 (Saros 141)
2160 Jun 18 (Saros 142)	2189 May 29 (Saros 143)	

=== Half-Saros cycle ===
A lunar eclipse will be preceded and followed by solar eclipses by 9 years and 5.5 days (a half saros). This lunar eclipse is related to two total solar eclipses of Solar Saros 143.

October 12, 1977	October 24, 1995

== See also ==
- List of lunar eclipses
- List of 20th-century lunar eclipses
