= Tetrad (geometry puzzle) =

Geometry puzzle

Tetrad with one central region and 3 surrounding ones	Tetrad with a hole

In geometry, a tetrad is a set of four simply connected disjoint planar regions in the plane, each pair sharing a finite portion of common boundary. It was named by Michael R. W. Buckley in 1975 in the Journal of Recreational Mathematics. A further question was proposed that became a puzzle, whether the 4 regions could be congruent, with or without holes, other enclosed regions.

== Fewest sides and vertices ==
The solutions with four congruent tiles include some with five sides. However, their placement surrounds an uncovered hole in the plane. Among solutions without holes, the ones with the fewest possible sides are given by a hexagon identified by Scott Kim as a student at Stanford University. It is not known whether five-sided solutions without holes are possible.

Kim's solution has 16 vertices, while some of the pentagon solutions have as few as 11 vertices. It is not known whether fewer vertices are possible.

== Congruent polyform solutions ==
Gardner offered a number of polyform (polyomino, polyiamond, and polyhex) solutions, with no holes.

11 squares

12 squares

10 triangles

22 triangles

26 triangles

4 hexagons
