= Tetrad (astronomy) =

Set of four total lunar eclipses within two years

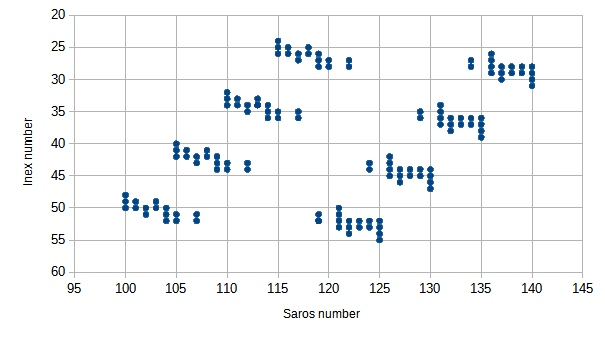
Inex and saros for tetrads between AD 1000 and 2500, showing the tetradia

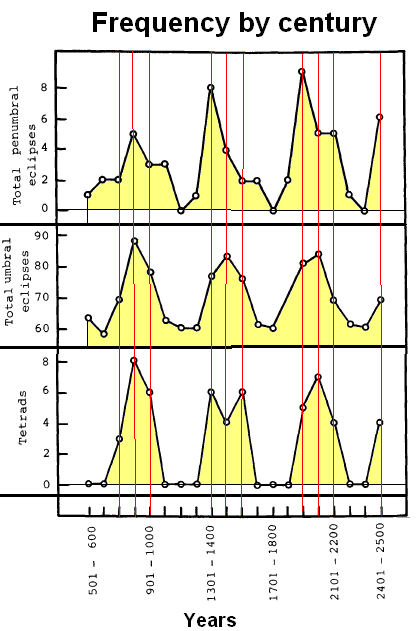

In astronomy, a tetrad is a set of four total lunar eclipses within two consecutive years.

The frequency of tetrads varies by century with the frequency of total lunar eclipses. This repeating cycle is called a tetradia. See Eclipse cycle for more information.

== List of tetrad events ==
=== 1949–2000 ===
Saros	Date Viewing	Type Chart	Saros	Date Viewing	Type Chart
1949–50
Descending node			Ascending node		
121	1949 Apr 13	Total	126	1949 Oct 07	Total
131	1950 Apr 02	Total	136	1950 Sep 26	Total
1967–68
Descending node			Ascending node		
121	1967 Apr 24	Total	126	1967 Oct 18	Total
131	1968 Apr 13	Total	136	1968 Oct 6	Total
1985–86
Descending node			Ascending node		
121	1985 May 04	Total	126	1985 Oct 28	Total
131	1986 Apr 24	Total	136	1986 Oct 17	Total

=== 2001–51 ===
Saros	Date Viewing	Type Chart	Saros	Date Viewing	Type Chart
2003–04
Descending node			Ascending node		
121	2003 May 16	total	126	2003 Nov 09	total
131	2004 May 04	total	136	2004 Oct 28	total
2014–15
Ascending node			Descending node		
122	2014 Apr 15	Total	127	2014 Oct 08	Total
132	2015 Apr 04	Total	137	2015 Sep 28	Total
2032–33
Ascending node			Descending node		
122	2032 Apr 25	Total	127	2032 Oct 18	Total
132	2033 Apr 14	Total	137	2033 Oct 08	Total
2043–44
Descending node			Ascending node		
123	2043 Mar 25	Total	128	2043 Sep 19	Total
133	2044 Mar 13	Total	138	2044 Sep 07	Total
2050–51
Ascending node			Descending node		
122	2050 May 06	Total	127	2050 Oct 30	Total
132	2051 Apr 26	Total	137	2051 Oct 19	Total

== See also ==
- Total penumbral lunar eclipse § Summary frequency of total penumbral, total umbral and tetrad events 501–2500 for statistics by century
- Blood moon prophecy Apocalyptic preaching of John Hagee and Mark Biltz in part based on the observed phenomenon.
