= April 1986 lunar eclipse =

Astronomical event

- Total eclipse
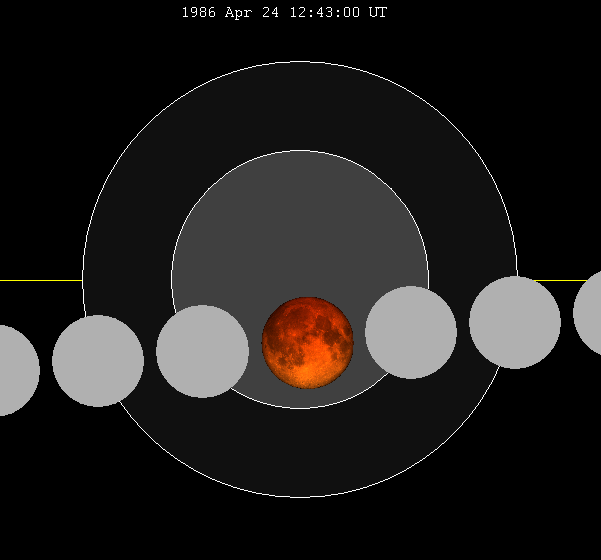
- The Moon's hourly motion shown right to left
- Date: April 24, 1986
- Gamma: −0.3683
- Magnitude: 1.2022
- Saros cycle: 131 (32 of 72)
- Totality: 63 minutes, 35 seconds
- Partiality: 198 minutes, 45 seconds
- Penumbral: 312 minutes, 37 seconds
Contacts (UTC)
- P1: 10:06:16
- U1: 11:03:13
- U2: 12:10:48
- Greatest: 12:42:35
- U3: 13:14:23
- U4: 14:21:58
- P4: 15:18:53

A total lunar eclipse occurred at the Moon’s descending node of orbit on Thursday, April 24, 1986, with an umbral magnitude of 1.2022. A lunar eclipse occurs when the Moon moves into the Earth's shadow, causing the Moon to be darkened. A total lunar eclipse occurs when the Moon's near side entirely passes into the Earth's umbral shadow. Unlike a solar eclipse, which can only be viewed from a relatively small area of the world, a lunar eclipse may be viewed from anywhere on the night side of Earth. A total lunar eclipse can last up to nearly two hours, while a total solar eclipse lasts only a few minutes at any given place, because the Moon's shadow is smaller. Occurring about 1.25 days before perigee (on April 25, 1986, at 18:40 UTC), the Moon's apparent diameter was larger.

This lunar eclipse was the third of a tetrad, with four total lunar eclipses in series, the others being on May 4, 1985; October 28, 1985; and October 17, 1986.

This lunar eclipse darkened the skies sufficiently in Australia to be able to provide a final naked-eye glimpse of Halley's Comet, prior to it subsequently disappearing from view until 2061.

== Visibility ==
The eclipse was completely visible over Australia, east and northeast Asia, Antarctica, and the western and central Pacific Ocean, seen rising over much of Asia and setting over North America and western South America.

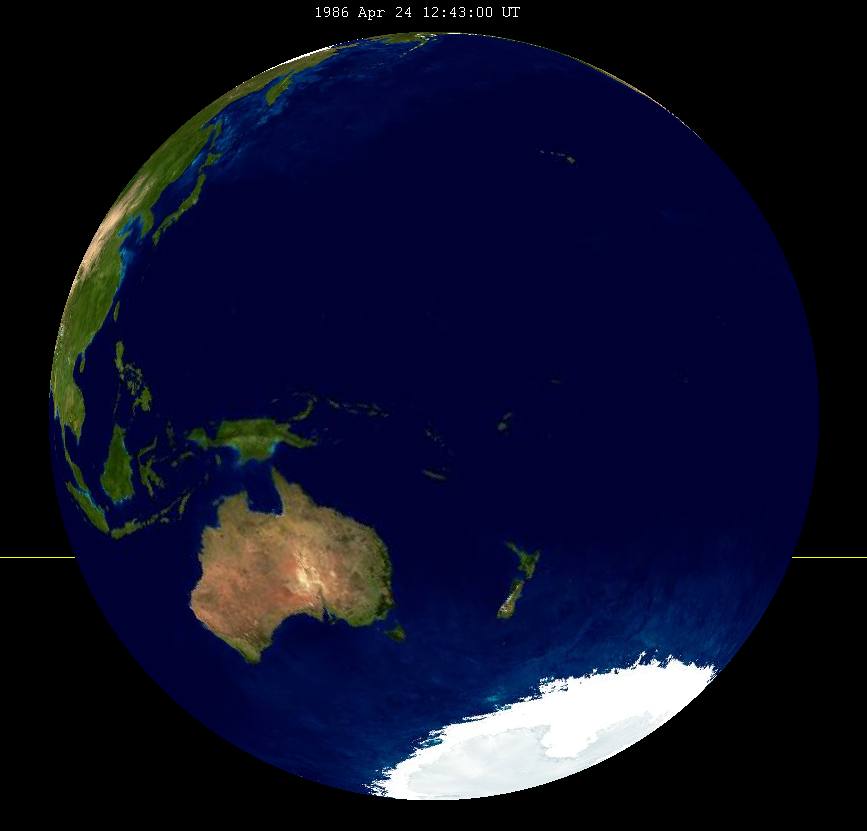
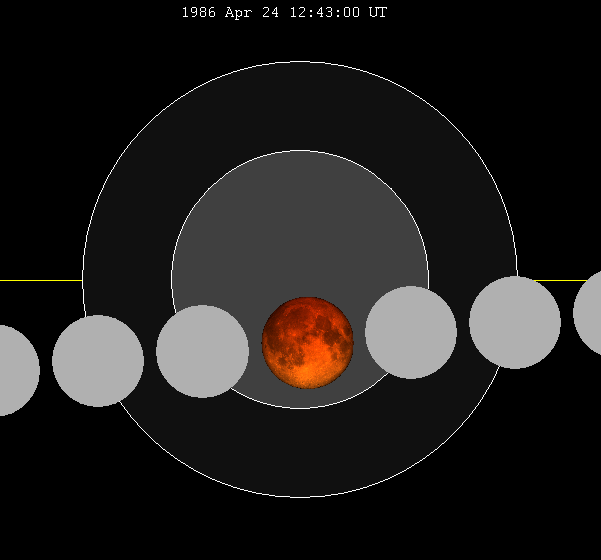

== Eclipse details ==
Shown below is a table displaying details about this particular solar eclipse. It describes various parameters pertaining to this eclipse.

April 24, 1986 Lunar Eclipse Parameters
Parameter	Value
Penumbral Magnitude	2.16203
Umbral Magnitude	1.20217
Gamma	−0.36826
Sun Right Ascension	02h07m09.8s
Sun Declination	+12°52'05.8"
Sun Semi-Diameter	15'54.1"
Sun Equatorial Horizontal Parallax	08.7"
Moon Right Ascension	14h06m30.3s
Moon Declination	-13°12'18.9"
Moon Semi-Diameter	16'34.0"
Moon Equatorial Horizontal Parallax	1°00'48.0"
ΔT	55.0 s

== Eclipse season ==
This eclipse is part of an eclipse season, a period, roughly every six months, when eclipses occur. Only two (or occasionally three) eclipse seasons occur each year, and each season lasts about 35 days and repeats just short of six months (173 days) later; thus two full eclipse seasons always occur each year. Either two or three eclipses happen each eclipse season. In the sequence below, each eclipse is separated by a fortnight.

Eclipse season of April 1986
April 9 Ascending node (new moon)	April 24 Descending node (full moon)
Partial solar eclipse Solar Saros 119	Total lunar eclipse Lunar Saros 131

== Related eclipses ==
=== Eclipses in 1986 ===
- A partial solar eclipse on April 9.
- A total lunar eclipse on April 24.
- A hybrid solar eclipse on October 3.
- A total lunar eclipse on October 17.

=== Metonic ===
- Preceded by: Lunar eclipse of July 6, 1982
- Followed by: Lunar eclipse of February 9, 1990

=== Tzolkinex ===
- Preceded by: Lunar eclipse of March 13, 1979
- Followed by: Lunar eclipse of June 4, 1993

=== Half-Saros ===
- Preceded by: Solar eclipse of April 18, 1977
- Followed by: Solar eclipse of April 29, 1995

=== Tritos ===
- Preceded by: Lunar eclipse of May 25, 1975
- Followed by: Lunar eclipse of March 24, 1997

=== Lunar Saros 131 ===
- Preceded by: Lunar eclipse of April 13, 1968
- Followed by: Lunar eclipse of May 4, 2004

=== Inex ===
- Preceded by: Lunar eclipse of May 13, 1957
- Followed by: Lunar eclipse of April 4, 2015

=== Triad ===
- Preceded by: Lunar eclipse of June 23, 1899
- Followed by: Lunar eclipse of February 22, 2073

=== Lunar eclipses of 1984–1987 ===
This eclipse is a member of a semester series. An eclipse in a semester series of lunar eclipses repeats approximately every 177 days and 4 hours (a semester) at alternating nodes of the Moon's orbit.

The penumbral lunar eclipse on June 13, 1984 occurs in the previous lunar year eclipse set.

Lunar eclipse series sets from 1984 to 1987
Descending node				Ascending node			
Saros	Date Viewing	Type Chart	Gamma	Saros	Date Viewing	Type Chart	Gamma
111	1984 May 15	Penumbral	1.1131	116	1984 Nov 08	Penumbral	−1.0900
121	1985 May 04	Total	0.3520	126	1985 Oct 28	Total	−0.4022
131	1986 Apr 24	Total	−0.3683	136	1986 Oct 17	Total	0.3189
141	1987 Apr 14	Penumbral	−1.1364	146	1987 Oct 07	Penumbral	1.0189

=== Metonic series ===
The Metonic cycle repeats nearly exactly every 19 years and represents a Saros cycle plus one lunar year. Because it occurs on the same calendar date, the Earth's shadow will in nearly the same location relative to the background stars.

Metonic lunar eclipse sets 1948–2005
Descending node			Ascending node		
Saros	Date	Type	Saros	Date	Type
111	1948 Apr 23	Partial	116	1948 Oct 18	Penumbral
121	1967 Apr 24	Total	126	1967 Oct 18	Total
131	1986 Apr 24	Total	136	1986 Oct 17	Total
141	2005 Apr 24	Penumbral	146	2005 Oct 17	Partial

=== Saros 131 ===
This eclipse is a part of Saros series 131, repeating every 18 years, 11 days, and containing 72 events. The series started with a penumbral lunar eclipse on May 10, 1427. It contains partial eclipses from July 25, 1553 through March 22, 1932; total eclipses from April 2, 1950 through September 3, 2202; and a second set of partial eclipses from September 13, 2220 through April 9, 2563. The series ends at member 72 as a penumbral eclipse on July 7, 2707.

The longest duration of totality will be produced by member 38 at 100 minutes, 36 seconds on June 28, 2094. All eclipses in this series occur at the Moon’s descending node of orbit.

Greatest	First			
The greatest eclipse of the series will occur on 2094 Jun 28, lasting 100 minutes, 36 seconds.	Penumbral	Partial	Total	Central
The greatest eclipse of the series will occur on 2094 Jun 28, lasting 100 minutes, 36 seconds.	1427 May 10	1553 Jul 25	1950 Apr 02	2022 May 16
The greatest eclipse of the series will occur on 2094 Jun 28, lasting 100 minutes, 36 seconds.	Last			
The greatest eclipse of the series will occur on 2094 Jun 28, lasting 100 minutes, 36 seconds.	Central	Total	Partial	Penumbral
The greatest eclipse of the series will occur on 2094 Jun 28, lasting 100 minutes, 36 seconds.	2148 Jul 31	2202 Sep 03	2563 Apr 09	2707 Jul 07

Eclipses are tabulated in three columns; every third eclipse in the same column is one exeligmos apart, so they all cast shadows over approximately the same parts of the Earth.

Series members 22–43 occur between 1801 and 2200:
22	23	24
1806 Jan 05	1824 Jan 16	1842 Jan 26
25	26	27
1860 Feb 07	1878 Feb 17	1896 Feb 28
28	29	30
1914 Mar 12	1932 Mar 22	1950 Apr 02
31	32	33
1968 Apr 13	1986 Apr 24	2004 May 04
34	35	36
2022 May 16	2040 May 26	2058 Jun 06
37	38	39
2076 Jun 17	2094 Jun 28	2112 Jul 09
40	41	42
2130 Jul 21	2148 Jul 31	2166 Aug 11
43
2184 Aug 21

=== Tritos series ===
This eclipse is a part of a tritos cycle, repeating at alternating nodes every 135 synodic months (≈ 3986.63 days, or 11 years minus 1 month). Their appearance and longitude are irregular due to a lack of synchronization with the anomalistic month (period of perigee), but groupings of 3 tritos cycles (≈ 33 years minus 3 months) come close (≈ 434.044 anomalistic months), so eclipses are similar in these groupings.

Series members between 1801 and 2200
1811 Sep 02 (Saros 115)	1822 Aug 03 (Saros 116)	1833 Jul 02 (Saros 117)	1844 May 31 (Saros 118)	1855 May 02 (Saros 119)
1866 Mar 31 (Saros 120)	1877 Feb 27 (Saros 121)	1888 Jan 28 (Saros 122)	1898 Dec 27 (Saros 123)	1909 Nov 27 (Saros 124)
1920 Oct 27 (Saros 125)	1931 Sep 26 (Saros 126)	1942 Aug 26 (Saros 127)	1953 Jul 26 (Saros 128)	1964 Jun 25 (Saros 129)
1975 May 25 (Saros 130)	1986 Apr 24 (Saros 131)	1997 Mar 24 (Saros 132)	2008 Feb 21 (Saros 133)	2019 Jan 21 (Saros 134)
2029 Dec 20 (Saros 135)	2040 Nov 18 (Saros 136)	2051 Oct 19 (Saros 137)	2062 Sep 18 (Saros 138)	2073 Aug 17 (Saros 139)
2084 Jul 17 (Saros 140)	2095 Jun 17 (Saros 141)	2106 May 17 (Saros 142)	2117 Apr 16 (Saros 143)	2128 Mar 16 (Saros 144)
2139 Feb 13 (Saros 145)	2150 Jan 13 (Saros 146)	2160 Dec 13 (Saros 147)	2171 Nov 12 (Saros 148)	2182 Oct 11 (Saros 149)
2193 Sep 11 (Saros 150)

=== Inex series ===
This eclipse is a part of the long period inex cycle, repeating at alternating nodes, every 358 synodic months (≈ 10,571.95 days, or 29 years minus 20 days). Their appearance and longitude are irregular due to a lack of synchronization with the anomalistic month (period of perigee). However, groupings of 3 inex cycles (≈ 87 years minus 2 months) comes close (≈ 1,151.02 anomalistic months), so eclipses are similar in these groupings.

Series members between 1801 and 2200
1812 Aug 22 (Saros 125)	1841 Aug 02 (Saros 126)	1870 Jul 12 (Saros 127)
1899 Jun 23 (Saros 128)	1928 Jun 03 (Saros 129)	1957 May 13 (Saros 130)
1986 Apr 24 (Saros 131)	2015 Apr 04 (Saros 132)	2044 Mar 13 (Saros 133)
2073 Feb 22 (Saros 134)	2102 Feb 03 (Saros 135)	2131 Jan 13 (Saros 136)
2159 Dec 24 (Saros 137)	2188 Dec 04 (Saros 138)	

=== Half-Saros cycle ===
A lunar eclipse will be preceded and followed by solar eclipses by 9 years and 5.5 days (a half saros). This lunar eclipse is related to two annular solar eclipses of Solar Saros 138.

April 18, 1977	April 29, 1995

== See also ==
- List of lunar eclipses
- List of 20th-century lunar eclipses
- Blood Moon
- Orbit of the Moon
