= Solar Saros 143 =

Saros cycle series 143 for solar eclipses

Historic saros cycle animation

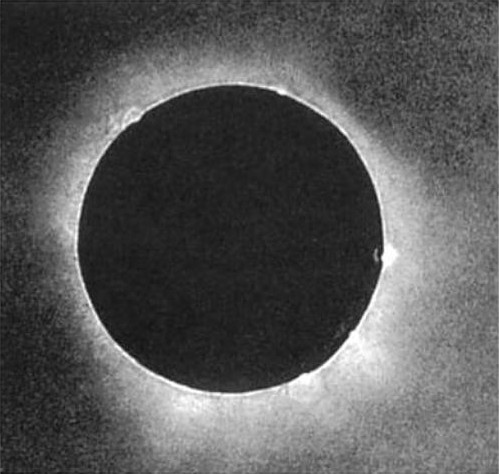
The total solar eclipse of July 28, 1851 was photographed by Berkowski at the Royal Observatory in Königsberg, Prussia. It is member 14 of Saros series 143

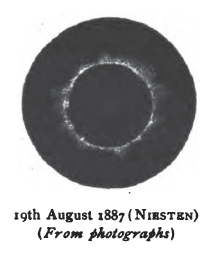
August 19, 1887 Series member 16

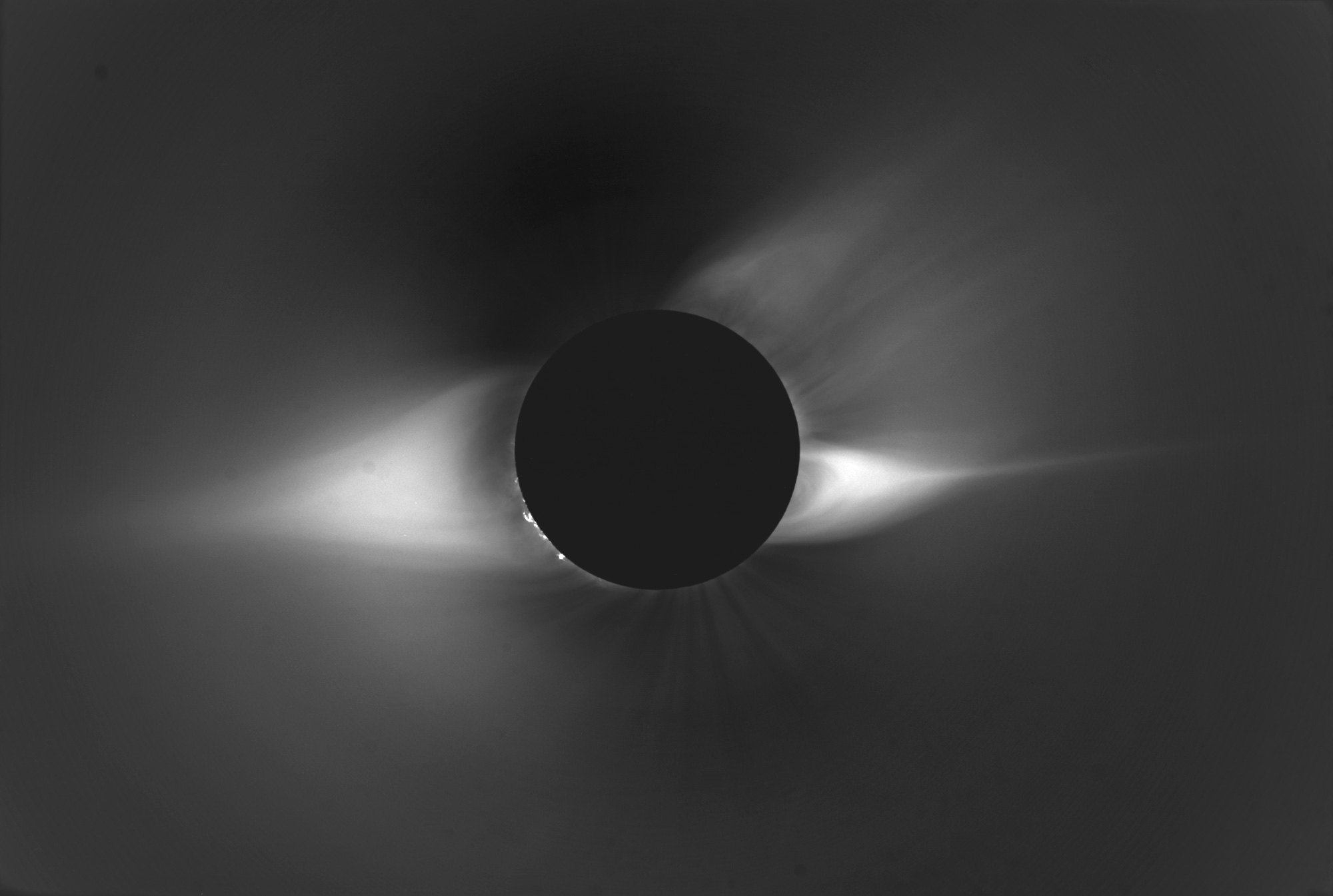
Corona during solar eclipse of October 24, 1995 by Fred Espenak from Dundlod, India. It is member 22 of Saros series 143

Saros cycle series 143 for solar eclipses occurs at the Moon's ascending node, repeating every 18 years and 11 days, containing 72 eclipses, 42 of which are umbral (12 total, 4 hybrid, and 26 annular). The first eclipse in the series was on 7 March 1617 and the last will be on 23 April 2897. The most recent eclipse was a hybrid eclipse on 3 November 2013 and the next will be a hybrid eclipse on 14 November 2031.

The longest totality was 3 minutes 50 seconds on 19 August 1887 and the longest annular will be 4 minutes 54 seconds on 6 September 2518.

This solar saros is linked to Lunar Saros 136.

== Umbral eclipses ==
Umbral eclipses (annular, total and hybrid) can be further classified as either: 1) Central (two limits), 2) Central (one limit) or 3) Non-Central (one limit). The statistical distribution of these classes in Saros series 143 appears in the following table.

Classification	Number	Percent
All Umbral eclipses	42	100.00%
Central (two limits)	42	100.00%
Central (one limit)	0	0.00%
Non-central (one limit)	0	0.00%

== All eclipses ==
Saros	Member	Date	Time (Greatest) UTC	Type	Location Lat, Long	Gamma	Mag.	Width (km)	Duration (min:sec)	Ref
143	1	March 7, 1617	10:05:36	Partial	61.2N 48.6W	1.511	0.0419			
143	2	March 18, 1635	18:24:53	Partial	61.1N 177.7E	1.4813	0.0973			
143	3	March 29, 1653	2:38:06	Partial	61.2N 45.6E	1.4469	0.1622			
143	4	April 9, 1671	10:41:25	Partial	61.4N 84.1W	1.4047	0.2423			
143	5	April 19, 1689	18:39:23	Partial	61.7N 147.5E	1.3581	0.3312			
143	6	May 2, 1707	2:28:17	Partial	62.2N 21.4E	1.3047	0.4339			
143	7	May 12, 1725	10:12:19	Partial	62.8N 103.7W	1.2472	0.5447			
143	8	May 23, 1743	17:48:55	Partial	63.5N 132.9E	1.1838	0.6672			
143	9	June 3, 1761	1:22:38	Partial	64.4N 9.9E	1.1182	0.7939			
143	10	June 14, 1779	8:51:28	Partial	65.3N 112.1W	1.0489	0.9276			
143	11	June 24, 1797	16:18:13	Total	77.2N 133.9E	0.978	1.057	975	2m 47s	
143	12	July 6, 1815	23:43:07	Total	88.1N 162.7W	0.9062	1.0593	470	3m 13s	
143	13	July 17, 1833	7:08:02	Total	77.5N 92.5E	0.8348	1.0591	357	3m 29s	
143	14	July 28, 1851	14:33:42	Total	68N 19.6W	0.7644	1.0577	296	3m 41s	
143	15	August 7, 1869	22:01:05	Total	59.1N 133.2W	0.696	1.0551	254	3m 48s	
143	16	August 19, 1887	5:32:05	Total	50.6N 111.9E	0.6312	1.0518	221	3m 50s	
143	17	August 30, 1905	13:07:26	Total	42.5N 4.3W	0.5708	1.0477	192	3m 46s	
143	18	September 10, 1923	20:47:29	Total	34.7N 121.8W	0.5149	1.043	167	3m 37s	
143	19	September 21, 1941	4:34:03	Total	27.3N 119.1E	0.4649	1.0379	143	3m 22s	
143	20	October 2, 1959	12:27:00	Total	20.4N 1.4W	0.4207	1.0325	120	3m 2s	
143	21	October 12, 1977	20:27:27	Total	14.1N 123.6W	0.3836	1.0269	99	2m 37s	
143	22	October 24, 1995	4:33:30	Total	8.4N 113.2E	0.3518	1.0213	78	2m 10s	
143	23	November 3, 2013	12:47:36	Hybrid (Note: Began as annular and ended as total)	3.5N 11.7W	0.3272	1.0159	58	1m 40s	
143	24	November 14, 2031	21:07:31	Hybrid	0.6S 137.6W	0.3078	1.0106	38	1m 8s	
143	25	November 25, 2049	5:33:48	Hybrid	3.8S 95.2E	0.2943	1.0057	21	0m 38s	
143	26	December 6, 2067	14:03:43	Hybrid	6S 32.4W	0.2845	1.0011	4	0m 8s	
143	27	December 16, 2085	22:37:48	Annular	7.3S 160.8W	0.2786	0.9971	10	0m 19s	
143	28	December 29, 2103	7:13:18	Annular	7.5S 70.5E	0.2747	0.9936	23	0m 43s	
143	29	January 8, 2122	15:48:51	Annular	6.9S 58.2W	0.2713	0.9907	34	1m 2s	
143	30	January 20, 2140	0:23:11	Annular	5.5S 173.4E	0.2676	0.9882	43	1m 17s	
143	31	January 30, 2158	8:54:37	Annular	3.4S 45.5E	0.262	0.9863	50	1m 27s	
143	32	February 10, 2176	17:21:21	Annular	0.9S 81.3W	0.2532	0.9849	55	1m 34s	
143	33	February 21, 2194	1:41:31	Annular	1.9N 153.5E	0.2396	0.984	58	1m 38s	
143	34	March 4, 2212	9:55:00	Annular	4.9N 30.1E	0.2211	0.9834	60	1m 40s	
143	35	March 15, 2230	18:00:26	Annular	7.9N 91.3W	0.1964	0.9831	61	1m 40s	
143	36	March 26, 2248	1:56:01	Annular	10.6N 150.1E	0.1643	0.9829	61	1m 41s	
143	37	April 6, 2266	9:42:37	Annular	12.9N 34E	0.1255	0.9829	61	1m 42s	
143	38	April 16, 2284	17:19:22	Annular	14.6N 79.2W	0.0792	0.9827	61	1m 45s	
143	39	April 29, 2302	0:47:19	Annular	15.6N 170E	0.0263	0.9825	62	1m 49s	
143	40	May 9, 2320	8:04:33	Annular	15.6N 62.1E	-0.0347	0.982	64	1m 56s	
143	41	May 20, 2338	15:14:20	Annular	14.5N 44W	-0.1011	0.9812	67	2m 7s	
143	42	May 30, 2356	22:15:18	Annular	12.2N 148W	-0.1735	0.98	72	2m 21s	
143	43	June 11, 2374	5:09:56	Annular	8.8N 109.1E	-0.2504	0.9784	79	2m 39s	
143	44	June 21, 2392	11:57:58	Annular	4.1N 7.3E	-0.3319	0.9762	90	3m 2s	
143	45	July 2, 2410	18:42:30	Annular	1.6S 94.4W	-0.4152	0.9735	104	3m 25s	
143	46	July 13, 2428	1:23:55	Annular	8.3S 163.9E	-0.4998	0.9702	123	3m 50s	
143	47	July 24, 2446	8:03:11	Annular	16S 61.9E	-0.5854	0.9665	149	4m 13s	
143	48	August 3, 2464	14:43:00	Annular	24.5S 41.3W	-0.6692	0.9621	184	4m 32s	
143	49	August 14, 2482	21:23:36	Annular	33.7S 145.8W	-0.7515	0.9573	234	4m 45s	
143	50	August 26, 2500	4:08:16	Annular	43.8S 106.9E	-0.8296	0.9518	313	4m 53s	
143	51	September 6, 2518	10:55:41	Annular	54.9S 4.8W	-0.9046	0.9458	467	4m 54s	
143	52	September 16, 2536	17:50:18	Annular	67.2S 131.1W	-0.9727	0.9385	1025	4m 48s	
143	53	September 28, 2554	0:50:14	Partial	72.3S 76E	-1.0357	0.8994			
143	54	October 8, 2572	7:58:20	Partial	72S 44.8W	-1.0915	0.8031			
143	55	October 19, 2590	15:13:18	Partial	71.5S 167W	-1.1411	0.718			
143	56	October 30, 2608	22:37:25	Partial	70.8S 69E	-1.1828	0.6469			
143	57	November 11, 2626	6:08:45	Partial	70S 56.1W	-1.218	0.5874			
143	58	November 21, 2644	13:47:29	Partial	69S 177.5E	-1.2468	0.539			
143	59	December 2, 2662	21:32:54	Partial	67.9S 50.2E	-1.2698	0.5007			
143	60	December 13, 2680	5:25:03	Partial	66.8S 78.3W	-1.2874	0.4715			
143	61	December 24, 2698	13:21:08	Partial	65.8S 152.7E	-1.3014	0.4485			
143	62	January 4, 2717	21:20:53	Partial	64.7S 23.3E	-1.3123	0.4307			
143	63	January 16, 2735	5:21:36	Partial	63.8S 106W	-1.3223	0.4143			
143	64	January 26, 2753	13:23:39	Partial	63S 124.7E	-1.3311	0.3997			
143	65	February 6, 2771	21:22:12	Partial	62.3S 3.5W	-1.3429	0.3802			
143	66	February 17, 2789	5:19:18	Partial	61.7S 131.1W	-1.3557	0.3587			
143	67	February 28, 2807	13:10:08	Partial	61.4S 102.9E	-1.3736	0.3288			
143	68	March 10, 2825	20:56:44	Partial	61.1S 21.8W	-1.3948	0.293			
143	69	March 22, 2843	4:34:11	Partial	61.1S 144.3W	-1.4236	0.2443			
143	70	April 1, 2861	12:06:04	Partial	61.2S 94.6E	-1.4566	0.188			
143	71	April 12, 2879	19:28:29	Partial	61.5S 24.2W	-1.4973	0.1183			
143	72	April 23, 2897	2:43:17	Partial	61.9S 141.2W	-1.5438	0.038			
