= October 1939 lunar eclipse =

Partial lunar eclipse October 28, 1939

- Partial eclipse
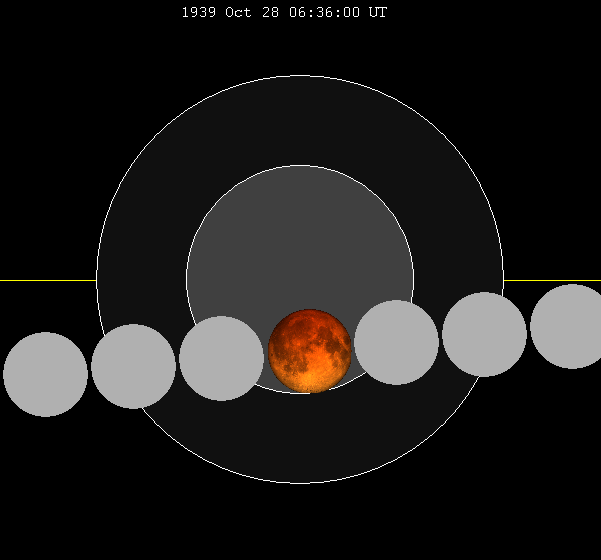
- The Moon's hourly motion shown right to left
- Date: October 28, 1939
- Gamma: −0.4581
- Magnitude: 0.9876
- Saros cycle: 135 (19 of 71)
- Partiality: 203 minutes, 22 seconds
- Penumbral: 346 minutes, 5 seconds
Contacts (UTC)
- P1: 3:43:14
- U1: 4:54:40
- Greatest: 6:36:19
- U4: 8:18:01
- P4: 9:29:19

A partial lunar eclipse occurred at the Moon’s descending node of orbit on Saturday, October 28, 1939, with an umbral magnitude of 0.9876. A lunar eclipse occurs when the Moon moves into the Earth's shadow, causing the Moon to be darkened. A partial lunar eclipse occurs when one part of the Moon is in the Earth's umbra, while the other part is in the Earth's penumbra. Unlike a solar eclipse, which can only be viewed from a relatively small area of the world, a lunar eclipse may be viewed from anywhere on the night side of Earth. Occurring about 5.3 days after apogee (on October 23, 1939, at 0:05 UTC), the Moon's apparent diameter was smaller.

This lunar eclipse was the last of an almost tetrad, with the others being on May 14, 1938 (total); November 7, 1938 (total); and May 3, 1939 (total).

This was the last partial lunar eclipse of the first set of partial eclipses in Lunar Saros 135 as well as the largest partial lunar eclipse of the 20th century.

== Visibility ==
The eclipse was completely visible over North America and western South America, seen rising over northeast Asia and eastern Australia and setting over eastern South America, west and central Africa, and Europe.

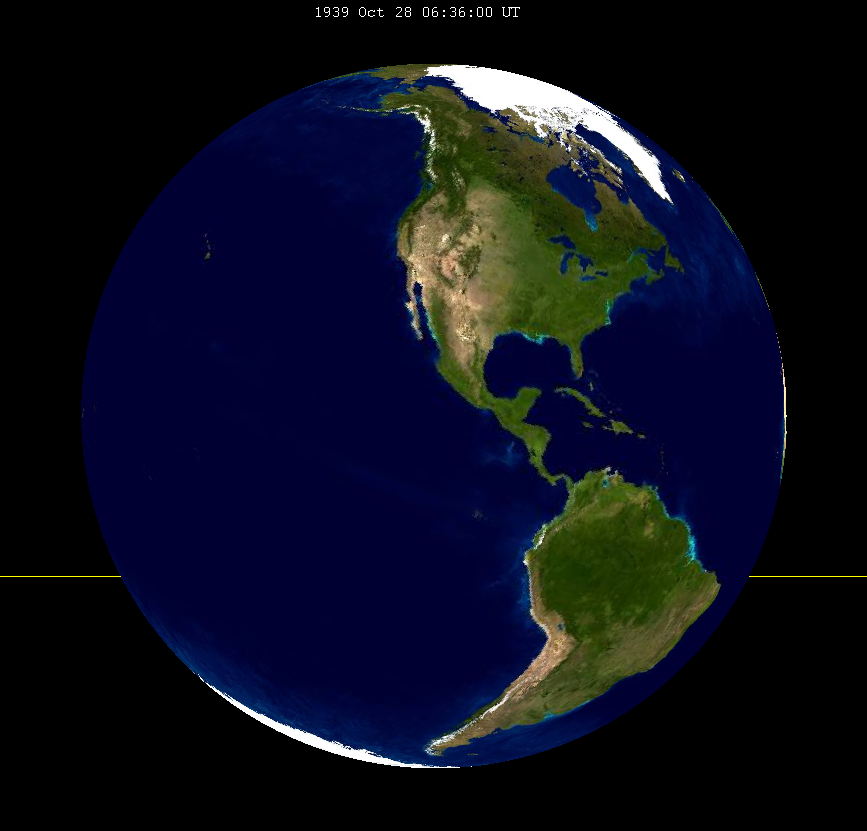
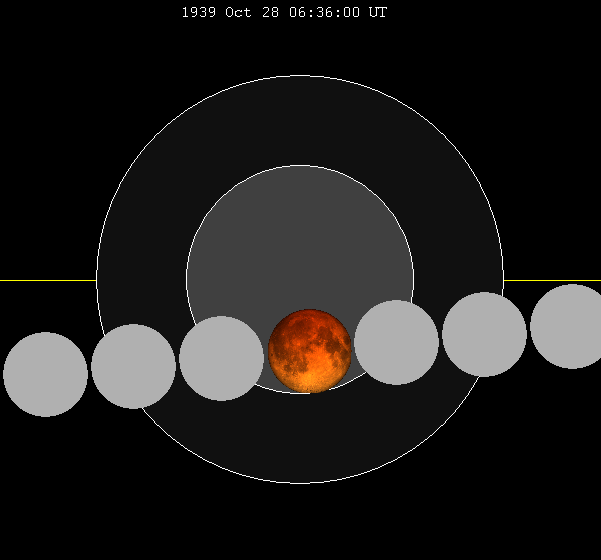

== Eclipse details ==
Shown below is a table describing various parameters pertaining to this eclipse.

October 28, 1939 Lunar Eclipse Parameters
Parameter	Value
Penumbral Magnitude	2.04769
Umbral Magnitude	0.98764
Gamma	−0.45812
Sun Right Ascension	14h06m46.1s
Sun Declination	-12°50'04.8"
Sun Semi-Diameter	16'05.9"
Sun Equatorial Horizontal Parallax	08.9"
Moon Right Ascension	02h07m11.5s
Moon Declination	+12°25'18.8"
Moon Semi-Diameter	15'11.2"
Moon Equatorial Horizontal Parallax	0°55'44.2"
ΔT	24.4 s

== Eclipse season ==
This eclipse is part of an eclipse season, a period, roughly every six months, when eclipses occur. Only two (or occasionally three) eclipse seasons occur each year, and each season lasts about 35 days and repeats just short of six months (173 days) later; thus two full eclipse seasons always occur each year. Either two or three eclipses happen each eclipse season. In the sequence below, each eclipse is separated by a fortnight.

Eclipse season of October 1939
October 12 Ascending node (new moon)	October 28 Descending node (full moon)
Total solar eclipse Solar Saros 123	Partial lunar eclipse Lunar Saros 135

== Related eclipses ==
=== Eclipses in 1939 ===
- An annular solar eclipse on April 19.
- A total lunar eclipse on May 3.
- A total solar eclipse on October 12.
- A partial lunar eclipse on October 28.

=== Metonic ===
- Preceded by: Lunar eclipse of January 8, 1936
- Followed by: Lunar eclipse of August 15, 1943

=== Tzolkinex ===
- Preceded by: Lunar eclipse of September 14, 1932
- Followed by: Lunar eclipse of December 8, 1946

=== Half-Saros ===
- Preceded by: Solar eclipse of October 21, 1930
- Followed by: Solar eclipse of November 1, 1948

=== Tritos ===
- Preceded by: Lunar eclipse of November 27, 1928
- Followed by: Lunar eclipse of September 26, 1950

=== Lunar Saros 135 ===
- Preceded by: Lunar eclipse of October 16, 1921
- Followed by: Lunar eclipse of November 7, 1957

=== Inex ===
- Preceded by: Lunar eclipse of November 17, 1910
- Followed by: Lunar eclipse of October 6, 1968

=== Triad ===
- Preceded by: Lunar eclipse of December 26, 1852
- Followed by: Lunar eclipse of August 28, 2026

=== Lunar eclipses of 1937–1940 ===
This eclipse is a member of a semester series. An eclipse in a semester series of lunar eclipses repeats approximately every 177 days and 4 hours (a semester) at alternating nodes of the Moon's orbit.

The penumbral lunar eclipse on March 23, 1940 occurs in the next lunar year eclipse set.

Lunar eclipse series sets from 1937 to 1940
Ascending node				Descending node			
Saros	Date Viewing	Type Chart	Gamma	Saros	Date Viewing	Type Chart	Gamma
110	1937 May 25	Penumbral	−1.1582	115	1937 Nov 18	Partial	0.9421
120	1938 May 14	Total	−0.3994	125	1938 Nov 07	Total	0.2739
130	1939 May 03	Total	0.3693	135	1939 Oct 28	Partial	−0.4581
140	1940 Apr 22	Penumbral	1.0741	145	1940 Oct 16	Penumbral	−1.1925

=== Saros 135 ===
This eclipse is a part of Saros series 135, repeating every 18 years, 11 days, and containing 71 events. The series started with a penumbral lunar eclipse on April 13, 1615. It contains partial eclipses from July 20, 1777 through October 28, 1939; total eclipses from November 7, 1957 through July 6, 2354; and a second set of partial eclipses from July 16, 2372 through September 19, 2480. The series ends at member 71 as a penumbral eclipse on May 18, 2877.

The longest duration of totality will be produced by member 37 at 106 minutes, 13 seconds on May 12, 2264. All eclipses in this series occur at the Moon’s descending node of orbit.

Greatest	First			
The greatest eclipse of the series will occur on 2264 May 12, lasting 106 minutes, 13 seconds.	Penumbral	Partial	Total	Central
The greatest eclipse of the series will occur on 2264 May 12, lasting 106 minutes, 13 seconds.	1615 Apr 13	1777 Jul 20	1957 Nov 07	2174 Mar 18
The greatest eclipse of the series will occur on 2264 May 12, lasting 106 minutes, 13 seconds.	Last			
The greatest eclipse of the series will occur on 2264 May 12, lasting 106 minutes, 13 seconds.	Central	Total	Partial	Penumbral
The greatest eclipse of the series will occur on 2264 May 12, lasting 106 minutes, 13 seconds.	2318 Jun 14	2354 Jul 06	2480 Sep 19	2877 May 18

Eclipses are tabulated in three columns; every third eclipse in the same column is one exeligmos apart, so they all cast shadows over approximately the same parts of the Earth.

Series members 12–33 occur between 1801 and 2200:
12	13	14
1813 Aug 12	1831 Aug 23	1849 Sep 02
15	16	17
1867 Sep 14	1885 Sep 24	1903 Oct 06
18	19	20
1921 Oct 16	1939 Oct 28	1957 Nov 07
21	22	23
1975 Nov 18	1993 Nov 29	2011 Dec 10
24	25	26
2029 Dec 20	2048 Jan 01	2066 Jan 11
27	28	29
2084 Jan 22	2102 Feb 03	2120 Feb 14
30	31	32
2138 Feb 24	2156 Mar 07	2174 Mar 18
33
2192 Mar 28

=== Tritos series ===
This eclipse is a part of a tritos cycle, repeating at alternating nodes every 135 synodic months (≈ 3986.63 days, or 11 years minus 1 month). Their appearance and longitude are irregular due to a lack of synchronization with the anomalistic month (period of perigee), but groupings of 3 tritos cycles (≈ 33 years minus 3 months) come close (≈ 434.044 anomalistic months), so eclipses are similar in these groupings.

Series members between 1801 and 2200
1808 Nov 03 (Saros 123)	1819 Oct 03 (Saros 124)	1830 Sep 02 (Saros 125)	1841 Aug 02 (Saros 126)	1852 Jul 01 (Saros 127)
1863 Jun 01 (Saros 128)	1874 May 01 (Saros 129)	1885 Mar 30 (Saros 130)	1896 Feb 28 (Saros 131)	1907 Jan 29 (Saros 132)
1917 Dec 28 (Saros 133)	1928 Nov 27 (Saros 134)	1939 Oct 28 (Saros 135)	1950 Sep 26 (Saros 136)	1961 Aug 26 (Saros 137)
1972 Jul 26 (Saros 138)	1983 Jun 25 (Saros 139)	1994 May 25 (Saros 140)	2005 Apr 24 (Saros 141)	2016 Mar 23 (Saros 142)
2027 Feb 20 (Saros 143)	2038 Jan 21 (Saros 144)	2048 Dec 20 (Saros 145)	2059 Nov 19 (Saros 146)	2070 Oct 19 (Saros 147)
2081 Sep 18 (Saros 148)	2092 Aug 17 (Saros 149)	2103 Jul 19 (Saros 150)	2114 Jun 18 (Saros 151)	2125 May 17 (Saros 152)
2136 Apr 16 (Saros 153)			2169 Jan 13 (Saros 156)	
2190 Nov 12 (Saros 158)

=== Inex series ===
This eclipse is a part of the long period inex cycle, repeating at alternating nodes, every 358 synodic months (≈ 10,571.95 days, or 29 years minus 20 days). Their appearance and longitude are irregular due to a lack of synchronization with the anomalistic month (period of perigee). However, groupings of 3 inex cycles (≈ 87 years minus 2 months) comes close (≈ 1,151.02 anomalistic months), so eclipses are similar in these groupings.

Series members between 1801 and 2200
1824 Jan 16 (Saros 131)	1852 Dec 26 (Saros 132)	1881 Dec 05 (Saros 133)
1910 Nov 17 (Saros 134)	1939 Oct 28 (Saros 135)	1968 Oct 06 (Saros 136)
1997 Sep 16 (Saros 137)	2026 Aug 28 (Saros 138)	2055 Aug 07 (Saros 139)
2084 Jul 17 (Saros 140)	2113 Jun 29 (Saros 141)	2142 Jun 08 (Saros 142)
2171 May 19 (Saros 143)	2200 Apr 30 (Saros 144)	

=== Half-Saros cycle ===
A lunar eclipse will be preceded and followed by solar eclipses by 9 years and 5.5 days (a half saros). This lunar eclipse is related to two total solar eclipses of Solar Saros 142.

October 21, 1930	November 1, 1948

== See also ==
- List of lunar eclipses
- List of 20th-century lunar eclipses
