= 1975 lunar eclipse =

Two total lunar eclipses occurred in 1975:

- 25 May 1975 lunar eclipse
- 18 November 1975 lunar eclipse

== See also ==
- List of 20th-century lunar eclipses
- Lists of lunar eclipses
