= 1993 lunar eclipse =

Two total lunar eclipses occurred in 1993:

- 4 June 1993 lunar eclipse
- 29 November 1993 lunar eclipse

== See also ==
- List of 20th-century lunar eclipses
- Lists of lunar eclipses
