= January 2084 lunar eclipse =

- Total eclipse
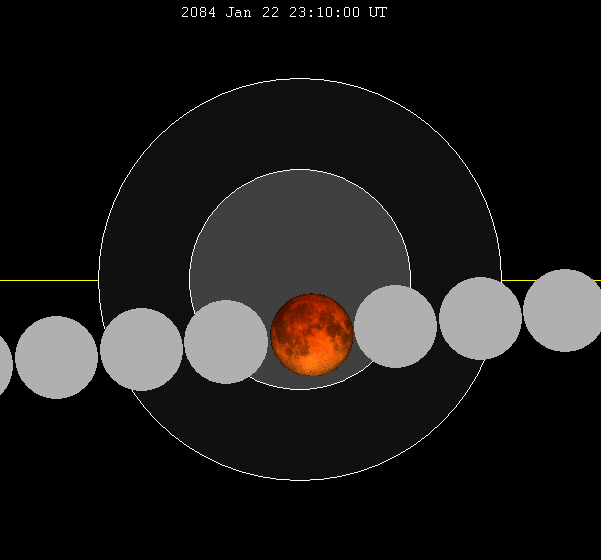
- The Moon's hourly motion shown right to left
- Date: January 22, 2084
- Gamma: −0.3610
- Magnitude: 1.1531
- Saros cycle: 135 (27 of 71)
- Totality: 60 minutes, 32 seconds
- Partiality: 216 minutes, 16 seconds
- Penumbral: 362 minutes, 0 seconds
Contacts (UTC)
- P1: 20:09:13
- U1: 21:22:08
- U2: 22:39:59
- Greatest: 23:10:14
- U3: 23:40:31
- U4: 0:58:23
- P4: 2:11:13

A total lunar eclipse will occur at the Moon’s descending node of orbit on Saturday, January 22, 2084, with an umbral magnitude of 1.1531. A lunar eclipse occurs when the Moon moves into the Earth's shadow, causing the Moon to be darkened. A total lunar eclipse occurs when the Moon's near side entirely passes into the Earth's umbral shadow. Unlike a solar eclipse, which can only be viewed from a relatively small area of the world, a lunar eclipse may be viewed from anywhere on the night side of Earth. A total lunar eclipse can last up to nearly two hours, while a total solar eclipse lasts only a few minutes at any given place, because the Moon's shadow is smaller. Occurring about 4 days after apogee (on January 18, 2084, at 23:50 UTC), the Moon's apparent diameter will be smaller.

This lunar eclipse will be the third of an almost tetrad, with the others being on February 2, 2083 (total); July 29, 2083 (total); and July 17, 2084 (partial).

== Visibility ==
The eclipse will be completely visible over Africa, Europe, and west and central Asia, seen rising over North and South America and setting over south and east Asia and western Australia.

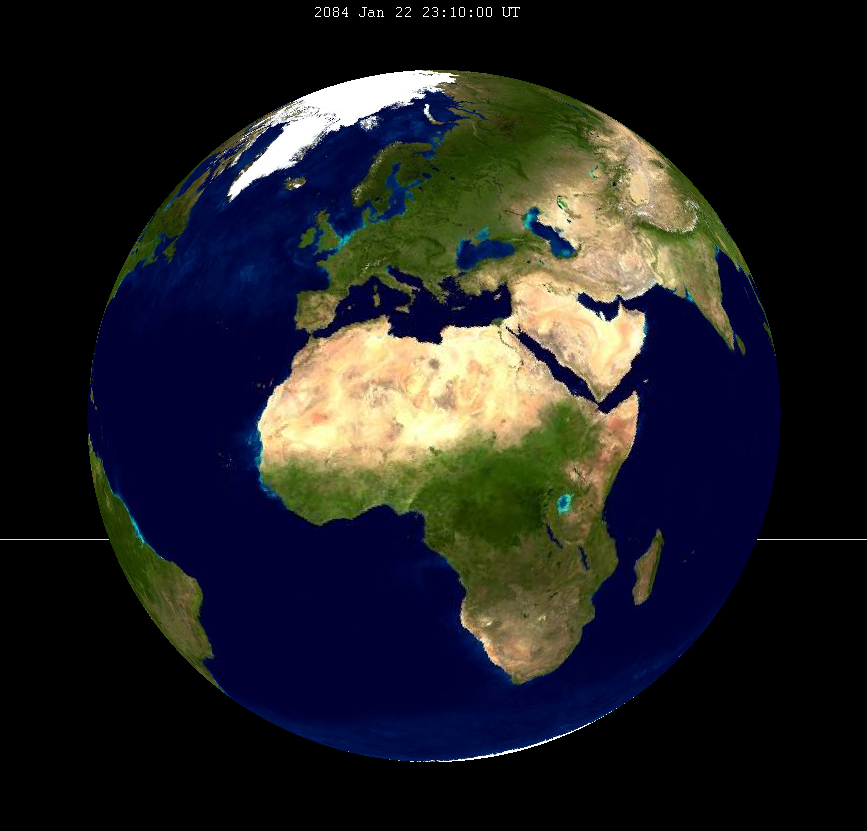
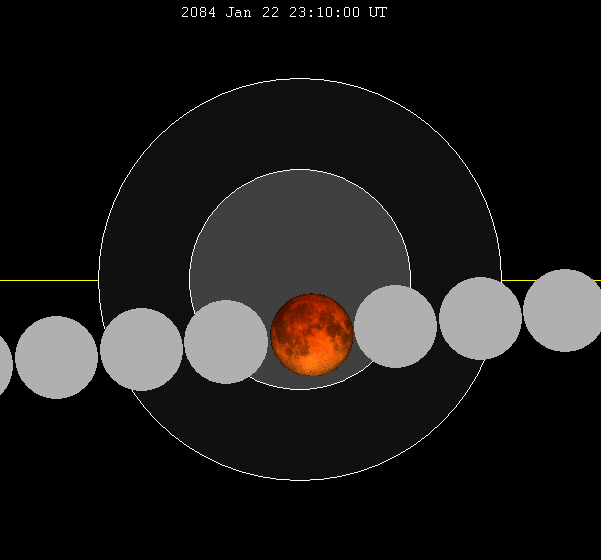

== Eclipse details ==
Shown below is a table displaying details about this particular solar eclipse. It describes various parameters pertaining to this eclipse.

January 22, 2084 Lunar Eclipse Parameters
Parameter	Value
Penumbral Magnitude	2.24251
Umbral Magnitude	1.15312
Gamma	−0.36098
Sun Right Ascension	20h20m36.4s
Sun Declination	-19°30'37.0"
Sun Semi-Diameter	16'15.1"
Sun Equatorial Horizontal Parallax	08.9"
Moon Right Ascension	08h20m09.1s
Moon Declination	+19°11'55.7"
Moon Semi-Diameter	14'55.1"
Moon Equatorial Horizontal Parallax	0°54'45.0"
ΔT	111.5 s

== Eclipse season ==
This eclipse is part of an eclipse season, a period, roughly every six months, when eclipses occur. Only two (or occasionally three) eclipse seasons occur each year, and each season lasts about 35 days and repeats just short of six months (173 days) later; thus two full eclipse seasons always occur each year. Either two or three eclipses happen each eclipse season. In the sequence below, each eclipse is separated by a fortnight.

Eclipse season of January 2084
January 7 Ascending node (new moon)	January 22 Descending node (full moon)
Partial solar eclipse Solar Saros 123	Total lunar eclipse Lunar Saros 135

== Related eclipses ==
=== Eclipses in 2084 ===
- A partial solar eclipse on January 7.
- A total lunar eclipse on January 22.
- An annular solar eclipse on July 3.
- A partial lunar eclipse on July 17.
- A total solar eclipse on December 27.

=== Metonic ===
- Preceded by: Lunar eclipse of April 4, 2080
- Followed by: Lunar eclipse of November 10, 2087

=== Tzolkinex ===
- Preceded by: Lunar eclipse of December 10, 2076
- Followed by: Lunar eclipse of March 5, 2091

=== Half-Saros ===
- Preceded by: Solar eclipse of January 16, 2075
- Followed by: Solar eclipse of January 27, 2093

=== Tritos ===
- Preceded by: Lunar eclipse of February 22, 2073
- Followed by: Lunar eclipse of December 21, 2094

=== Lunar Saros 135 ===
- Preceded by: Lunar eclipse of January 11, 2066
- Followed by: Lunar eclipse of February 3, 2102

=== Inex ===
- Preceded by: Lunar eclipse of February 11, 2055
- Followed by: Lunar eclipse of January 2, 2113

=== Triad ===
- Preceded by: Lunar eclipse of March 24, 1997
- Followed by: Lunar eclipse of November 23, 2170

=== Lunar eclipses of 2082–2085 ===
This eclipse is a member of a semester series. An eclipse in a semester series of lunar eclipses repeats approximately every 177 days and 4 hours (a semester) at alternating nodes of the Moon's orbit.

The penumbral lunar eclipses on June 8, 2085 and December 1, 2085 occur in the next lunar year eclipse set.

Lunar eclipse series sets from 2082 to 2085
Descending node				Ascending node			
Saros	Date Viewing	Type Chart	Gamma	Saros	Date Viewing	Type Chart	Gamma
115	2082 Feb 13	Partial	1.0101	120	2082 Aug 08	Penumbral	−1.0203
125	2083 Feb 02	Total	0.3463	130	2083 Jul 29	Total	−0.2143
135	2084 Jan 22	Total	−0.3610	140	2084 Jul 17	Partial	0.5312
145	2085 Jan 10	Penumbral	−1.0453	150	2085 Jul 07	Penumbral	1.2694

=== Saros 135 ===
This eclipse is a part of Saros series 135, repeating every 18 years, 11 days, and containing 71 events. The series started with a penumbral lunar eclipse on April 13, 1615. It contains partial eclipses from July 20, 1777 through October 28, 1939; total eclipses from November 7, 1957 through July 6, 2354; and a second set of partial eclipses from July 16, 2372 through September 19, 2480. The series ends at member 71 as a penumbral eclipse on May 18, 2877.

The longest duration of totality will be produced by member 37 at 106 minutes, 13 seconds on May 12, 2264. All eclipses in this series occur at the Moon’s descending node of orbit.

Greatest	First			
The greatest eclipse of the series will occur on 2264 May 12, lasting 106 minutes, 13 seconds.	Penumbral	Partial	Total	Central
The greatest eclipse of the series will occur on 2264 May 12, lasting 106 minutes, 13 seconds.	1615 Apr 13	1777 Jul 20	1957 Nov 07	2174 Mar 18
The greatest eclipse of the series will occur on 2264 May 12, lasting 106 minutes, 13 seconds.	Last			
The greatest eclipse of the series will occur on 2264 May 12, lasting 106 minutes, 13 seconds.	Central	Total	Partial	Penumbral
The greatest eclipse of the series will occur on 2264 May 12, lasting 106 minutes, 13 seconds.	2318 Jun 14	2354 Jul 06	2480 Sep 19	2877 May 18

Eclipses are tabulated in three columns; every third eclipse in the same column is one exeligmos apart, so they all cast shadows over approximately the same parts of the Earth.

Series members 12–33 occur between 1801 and 2200:
12	13	14
1813 Aug 12	1831 Aug 23	1849 Sep 02
15	16	17
1867 Sep 14	1885 Sep 24	1903 Oct 06
18	19	20
1921 Oct 16	1939 Oct 28	1957 Nov 07
21	22	23
1975 Nov 18	1993 Nov 29	2011 Dec 10
24	25	26
2029 Dec 20	2048 Jan 01	2066 Jan 11
27	28	29
2084 Jan 22	2102 Feb 03	2120 Feb 14
30	31	32
2138 Feb 24	2156 Mar 07	2174 Mar 18
33
2192 Mar 28

=== Tritos series ===
This eclipse is a part of a tritos cycle, repeating at alternating nodes every 135 synodic months (≈ 3986.63 days, or 11 years minus 1 month). Their appearance and longitude are irregular due to a lack of synchronization with the anomalistic month (period of perigee), but groupings of 3 tritos cycles (≈ 33 years minus 3 months) come close (≈ 434.044 anomalistic months), so eclipses are similar in these groupings.

Series members between 1801 and 2200
1811 Mar 10 (Saros 110)	1822 Feb 06 (Saros 111)	1833 Jan 06 (Saros 112)	1843 Dec 07 (Saros 113)	1854 Nov 04 (Saros 114)
1865 Oct 04 (Saros 115)	1876 Sep 03 (Saros 116)	1887 Aug 03 (Saros 117)	1898 Jul 03 (Saros 118)	1909 Jun 04 (Saros 119)
1920 May 03 (Saros 120)	1931 Apr 02 (Saros 121)	1942 Mar 03 (Saros 122)	1953 Jan 29 (Saros 123)	1963 Dec 30 (Saros 124)
1974 Nov 29 (Saros 125)	1985 Oct 28 (Saros 126)	1996 Sep 27 (Saros 127)	2007 Aug 28 (Saros 128)	2018 Jul 27 (Saros 129)
2029 Jun 26 (Saros 130)	2040 May 26 (Saros 131)	2051 Apr 26 (Saros 132)	2062 Mar 25 (Saros 133)	2073 Feb 22 (Saros 134)
2084 Jan 22 (Saros 135)	2094 Dec 21 (Saros 136)	2105 Nov 21 (Saros 137)	2116 Oct 21 (Saros 138)	2127 Sep 20 (Saros 139)
2138 Aug 20 (Saros 140)	2149 Jul 20 (Saros 141)	2160 Jun 18 (Saros 142)	2171 May 19 (Saros 143)	2182 Apr 18 (Saros 144)
2193 Mar 17 (Saros 145)

=== Inex series ===
This eclipse is a part of the long period inex cycle, repeating at alternating nodes, every 358 synodic months (≈ 10,571.95 days, or 29 years minus 20 days). Their appearance and longitude are irregular due to a lack of synchronization with the anomalistic month (period of perigee). However, groupings of 3 inex cycles (≈ 87 years minus 2 months) comes close (≈ 1,151.02 anomalistic months), so eclipses are similar in these groupings.

Series members between 1801 and 2200
1823 Jul 23 (Saros 126)	1852 Jul 01 (Saros 127)	1881 Jun 12 (Saros 128)
1910 May 24 (Saros 129)	1939 May 03 (Saros 130)	1968 Apr 13 (Saros 131)
1997 Mar 24 (Saros 132)	2026 Mar 03 (Saros 133)	2055 Feb 11 (Saros 134)
2084 Jan 22 (Saros 135)	2113 Jan 02 (Saros 136)	2141 Dec 13 (Saros 137)
2170 Nov 23 (Saros 138)	2199 Nov 02 (Saros 139)	

=== Half-Saros cycle ===
A lunar eclipse will be preceded and followed by solar eclipses by 9 years and 5.5 days (a half saros). This lunar eclipse is related to two total solar eclipses of Solar Saros 142.

January 16, 2075	January 27, 2093

== See also ==
- List of lunar eclipses and List of 21st-century lunar eclipses
