= January 2048 lunar eclipse =

Astronomical event

- Total eclipse
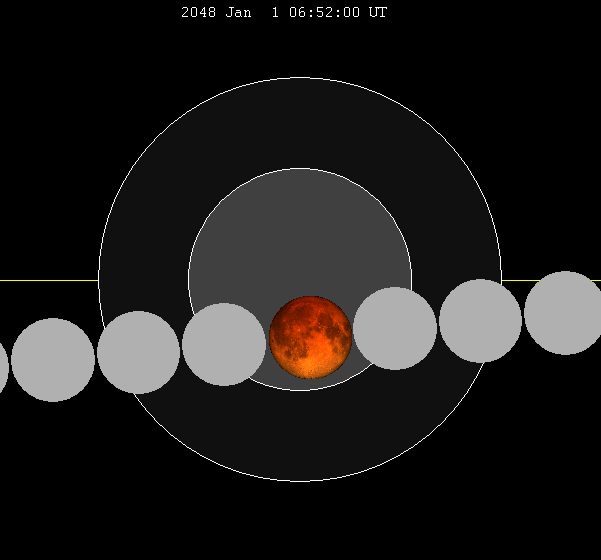
- The Moon's hourly motion shown right to left
- Date: January 1, 2048
- Gamma: −0.3745
- Magnitude: 1.1297
- Saros cycle: 135 (25 of 71)
- Totality: 55 minutes, 56 seconds
- Partiality: 214 minutes, 16 seconds
- Penumbral: 359 minutes, 26 seconds
Contacts (UTC)
- P1: 3:52:39
- U1: 5:05:17
- U2: 6:24:27
- Greatest: 6:52:24
- U3: 7:20:23
- U4: 8:39:33
- P4: 9:52:05

A total lunar eclipse will occur at the Moon’s descending node of orbit on Wednesday, January 1, 2048, with an umbral magnitude of 1.1297. A lunar eclipse occurs when the Moon moves into the Earth's shadow, causing the Moon to be darkened. A total lunar eclipse occurs when the Moon's near side entirely passes into the Earth's umbral shadow. Unlike a solar eclipse, which can only be viewed from a relatively small area of the world, a lunar eclipse may be viewed from anywhere on the night side of Earth. A total lunar eclipse can last up to nearly two hours, while a total solar eclipse lasts only a few minutes at any given place, because the Moon's shadow is smaller. Occurring about 4.4 days after apogee (on December 27, 2047, at 21:50 UTC), the Moon's apparent diameter will be smaller.

This will be the first recorded lunar eclipse to be visible on New Year's Day for nearly all of Earth's timezones. The next such eclipse will occur in 2094.

== Visibility ==
The eclipse will be completely visible over North America and western South America, seen rising over east and northeast Asia and eastern Australia and setting over much of Africa and Europe.

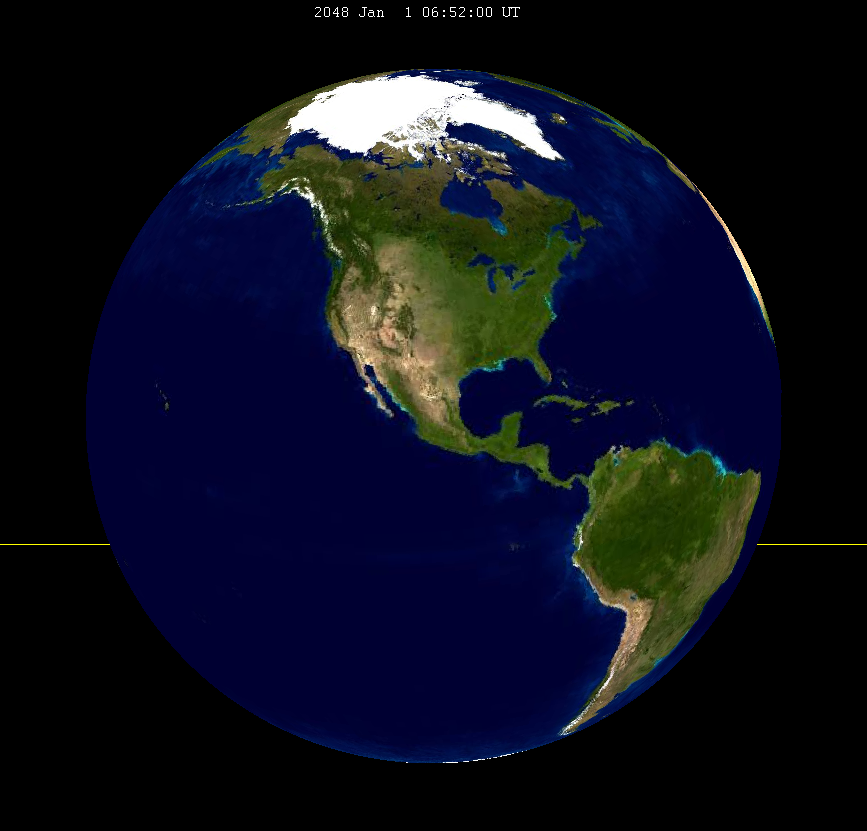
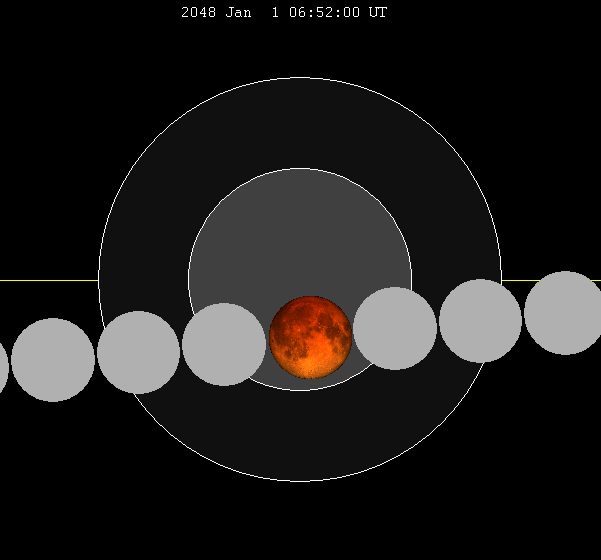

== Eclipse details ==
Shown below is a table displaying details about this particular solar eclipse. It describes various parameters pertaining to this eclipse.

January 1, 2048 Lunar Eclipse Parameters
Parameter	Value
Penumbral Magnitude	2.21576
Umbral Magnitude	1.12966
Gamma	−0.37456
Sun Right Ascension	18h45m45.0s
Sun Declination	-23°01'00.1"
Sun Semi-Diameter	16'15.9"
Sun Equatorial Horizontal Parallax	08.9"
Moon Right Ascension	06h45m29.1s
Moon Declination	+22°40'44.8"
Moon Semi-Diameter	14'58.6"
Moon Equatorial Horizontal Parallax	0°54'57.7"
ΔT	83.8 s

== Eclipse season ==
This eclipse is part of an eclipse season, a period, roughly every six months, when eclipses occur. Only two (or occasionally three) eclipse seasons occur each year, and each season lasts about 35 days and repeats just short of six months (173 days) later; thus two full eclipse seasons always occur each year. Either two or three eclipses happen each eclipse season. In the sequence below, each eclipse is separated by a fortnight.

Eclipse season of December 2047–January 2048
December 16 Ascending node (new moon)	January 1 Descending node (full moon)
Partial solar eclipse Solar Saros 123	Total lunar eclipse Lunar Saros 135

== Related eclipses ==
=== Eclipses in 2048 ===
- A total lunar eclipse on January 1.
- An annular solar eclipse on June 11.
- A partial lunar eclipse on June 26.
- A total solar eclipse on December 5.
- A penumbral lunar eclipse on December 20.

=== Metonic ===
- Preceded by: Lunar eclipse of March 13, 2044
- Followed by: Lunar eclipse of October 19, 2051

=== Tzolkinex ===
- Preceded by: Lunar eclipse of November 18, 2040
- Followed by: Lunar eclipse of February 11, 2055

=== Half-Saros ===
- Preceded by: Solar eclipse of December 26, 2038
- Followed by: Solar eclipse of January 5, 2057

=== Tritos ===
- Preceded by: Lunar eclipse of January 31, 2037
- Followed by: Lunar eclipse of November 30, 2058

=== Lunar Saros 135 ===
- Preceded by: Lunar eclipse of December 20, 2029
- Followed by: Lunar eclipse of January 11, 2066

=== Inex ===
- Preceded by: Lunar eclipse of January 21, 2019
- Followed by: Lunar eclipse of December 10, 2076

=== Triad ===
- Preceded by: Lunar eclipse of March 2, 1961
- Followed by: Lunar eclipse of November 2, 2134

=== Lunar eclipses of 2046–2049 ===
This eclipse is a member of a semester series. An eclipse in a semester series of lunar eclipses repeats approximately every 177 days and 4 hours (a semester) at alternating nodes of the Moon's orbit.

The penumbral lunar eclipses on May 17, 2049 and November 9, 2049 occur in the next lunar year eclipse set.

Lunar eclipse series sets from 2046 to 2049
Descending node				Ascending node			
Saros	Date Viewing	Type Chart	Gamma	Saros	Date Viewing	Type Chart	Gamma
115	2046 Jan 22	Partial	0.9885	120	2046 Jul 18	Partial	−0.8691
125	2047 Jan 12	Total	0.3317	130	2047 Jul 07	Total	−0.0636
135	2048 Jan 01	Total	−0.3745	140	2048 Jun 26	Partial	0.6796
145	2048 Dec 20	Penumbral	−1.0624	150	2049 Jun 15	Penumbral	1.4068

=== Saros 135 ===
This eclipse is a part of Saros series 135, repeating every 18 years, 11 days, and containing 71 events. The series started with a penumbral lunar eclipse on April 13, 1615. It contains partial eclipses from July 20, 1777 through October 28, 1939; total eclipses from November 7, 1957 through July 6, 2354; and a second set of partial eclipses from July 16, 2372 through September 19, 2480. The series ends at member 71 as a penumbral eclipse on May 18, 2877.

The longest duration of totality will be produced by member 37 at 106 minutes, 13 seconds on May 12, 2264. All eclipses in this series occur at the Moon’s descending node of orbit.

Greatest	First			
The greatest eclipse of the series will occur on 2264 May 12, lasting 106 minutes, 13 seconds.	Penumbral	Partial	Total	Central
The greatest eclipse of the series will occur on 2264 May 12, lasting 106 minutes, 13 seconds.	1615 Apr 13	1777 Jul 20	1957 Nov 07	2174 Mar 18
The greatest eclipse of the series will occur on 2264 May 12, lasting 106 minutes, 13 seconds.	Last			
The greatest eclipse of the series will occur on 2264 May 12, lasting 106 minutes, 13 seconds.	Central	Total	Partial	Penumbral
The greatest eclipse of the series will occur on 2264 May 12, lasting 106 minutes, 13 seconds.	2318 Jun 14	2354 Jul 06	2480 Sep 19	2877 May 18

Eclipses are tabulated in three columns; every third eclipse in the same column is one exeligmos apart, so they all cast shadows over approximately the same parts of the Earth.

Series members 12–33 occur between 1801 and 2200:
12	13	14
1813 Aug 12	1831 Aug 23	1849 Sep 02
15	16	17
1867 Sep 14	1885 Sep 24	1903 Oct 06
18	19	20
1921 Oct 16	1939 Oct 28	1957 Nov 07
21	22	23
1975 Nov 18	1993 Nov 29	2011 Dec 10
24	25	26
2029 Dec 20	2048 Jan 01	2066 Jan 11
27	28	29
2084 Jan 22	2102 Feb 03	2120 Feb 14
30	31	32
2138 Feb 24	2156 Mar 07	2174 Mar 18
33
2192 Mar 28

=== Tritos series ===
This eclipse is a part of a tritos cycle, repeating at alternating nodes every 135 synodic months (≈ 3986.63 days, or 11 years minus 1 month). Their appearance and longitude are irregular due to a lack of synchronization with the anomalistic month (period of perigee), but groupings of 3 tritos cycles (≈ 33 years minus 3 months) come close (≈ 434.044 anomalistic months), so eclipses are similar in these groupings.

Series members between 1801 and 2200
1807 Nov 15 (Saros 113)	1818 Oct 14 (Saros 114)	1829 Sep 13 (Saros 115)	1840 Aug 13 (Saros 116)	1851 Jul 13 (Saros 117)
1862 Jun 12 (Saros 118)	1873 May 12 (Saros 119)	1884 Apr 10 (Saros 120)	1895 Mar 11 (Saros 121)	1906 Feb 09 (Saros 122)
1917 Jan 08 (Saros 123)	1927 Dec 08 (Saros 124)	1938 Nov 07 (Saros 125)	1949 Oct 07 (Saros 126)	1960 Sep 05 (Saros 127)
1971 Aug 06 (Saros 128)	1982 Jul 06 (Saros 129)	1993 Jun 04 (Saros 130)	2004 May 04 (Saros 131)	2015 Apr 04 (Saros 132)
2026 Mar 03 (Saros 133)	2037 Jan 31 (Saros 134)	2048 Jan 01 (Saros 135)	2058 Nov 30 (Saros 136)	2069 Oct 30 (Saros 137)
2080 Sep 29 (Saros 138)	2091 Aug 29 (Saros 139)	2102 Jul 30 (Saros 140)	2113 Jun 29 (Saros 141)	2124 May 28 (Saros 142)
2135 Apr 28 (Saros 143)	2146 Mar 28 (Saros 144)	2157 Feb 24 (Saros 145)	2168 Jan 24 (Saros 146)	2178 Dec 24 (Saros 147)
2189 Nov 22 (Saros 148)	2200 Oct 23 (Saros 149)			

=== Inex series ===
This eclipse is a part of the long period inex cycle, repeating at alternating nodes, every 358 synodic months (≈ 10,571.95 days, or 29 years minus 20 days). Their appearance and longitude are irregular due to a lack of synchronization with the anomalistic month (period of perigee). However, groupings of 3 inex cycles (≈ 87 years minus 2 months) comes close (≈ 1,151.02 anomalistic months), so eclipses are similar in these groupings.

Series members between 1801 and 2200
1816 Jun 10 (Saros 127)	1845 May 21 (Saros 128)	1874 May 01 (Saros 129)
1903 Apr 12 (Saros 130)	1932 Mar 22 (Saros 131)	1961 Mar 02 (Saros 132)
1990 Feb 09 (Saros 133)	2019 Jan 21 (Saros 134)	2048 Jan 01 (Saros 135)
2076 Dec 10 (Saros 136)	2105 Nov 21 (Saros 137)	2134 Nov 02 (Saros 138)
2163 Oct 12 (Saros 139)	2192 Sep 21 (Saros 140)	

=== Half-Saros cycle ===
A lunar eclipse will be preceded and followed by solar eclipses by 9 years and 5.5 days (a half saros). This lunar eclipse is related to two total solar eclipses of Solar Saros 142.

December 26, 2038	January 5, 2057

== See also ==
- List of lunar eclipses and List of 21st-century lunar eclipses
