= 1957 lunar eclipse =

Two total lunar eclipses occurred in 1957:

- 13 May 1957 lunar eclipse
- 7 November 1957 lunar eclipse

== See also ==
- List of 20th-century lunar eclipses
- Lists of lunar eclipses
