= November 1993 lunar eclipse =

Total lunar eclipse November 29, 1993

- Total eclipse
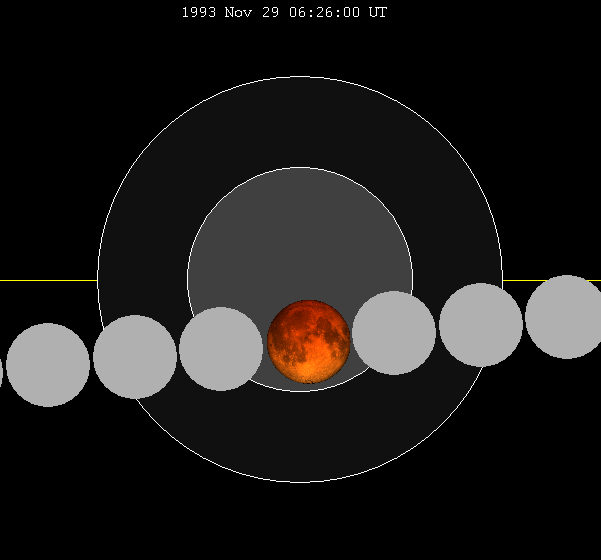
- The Moon's hourly motion shown right to left
- Date: November 29, 1993
- Gamma: −0.3994
- Magnitude: 1.0876
- Saros cycle: 135 (22 of 71)
- Totality: 45 minutes, 39 seconds
- Partiality: 210 minutes, 47 seconds
- Penumbral: 354 minutes, 23 seconds
Contacts (UTC)
- P1: 3:28:52
- U1: 4:40:44
- U2: 6:02:47
- Greatest: 6:26:06
- U3: 6:49:27
- U4: 8:11:31
- P4: 9:23:15

A total lunar eclipse occurred at the Moon’s descending node of orbit on Monday, November 29, 1993, with an umbral magnitude of 1.0876. A lunar eclipse occurs when the Moon moves into the Earth's shadow, causing the Moon to be darkened. A total lunar eclipse occurs when the Moon's near side entirely passes into the Earth's umbral shadow. Unlike a solar eclipse, which can only be viewed from a relatively small area of the world, a lunar eclipse may be viewed from anywhere on the night side of Earth. A total lunar eclipse can last up to nearly two hours, while a total solar eclipse lasts only a few minutes at any given place, because the Moon's shadow is smaller. Occurring about 4.75 days after apogee (on November 24, 1993, at 12:35 UTC), the Moon's apparent diameter was smaller.

== Visibility ==
The eclipse was completely visible over North America and western South America, seen rising over northeast Asia, eastern Australia, and the western and central Pacific Ocean and setting over eastern South America, much of Africa, and Europe.

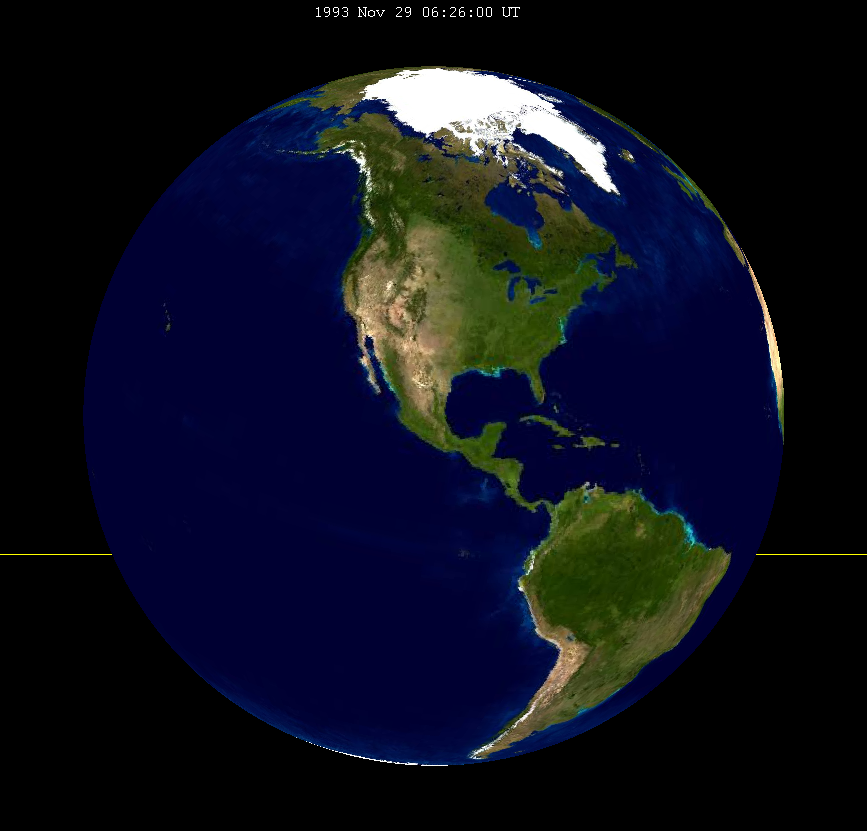
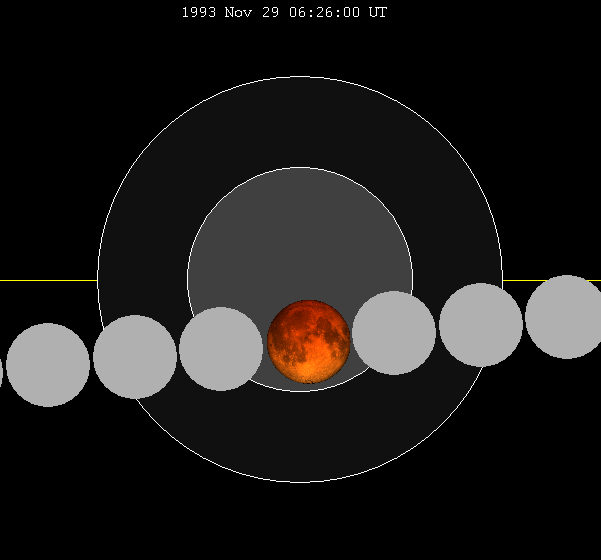

== Eclipse details ==
Shown below is a table displaying details about this particular lunar eclipse. It describes various parameters pertaining to this eclipse.

November 29, 1993 Lunar Eclipse Parameters
Parameter	Value
Penumbral Magnitude	2.16333
Umbral Magnitude	1.08758
Gamma	−0.39941
Sun Right Ascension	16h20m54.5s
Sun Declination	-21°29'12.4"
Sun Semi-Diameter	16'12.9"
Sun Equatorial Horizontal Parallax	08.9"
Moon Right Ascension	04h21m00.8s
Moon Declination	+21°07'09.8"
Moon Semi-Diameter	15'04.4"
Moon Equatorial Horizontal Parallax	0°55'19.3"
ΔT	59.9 s

== Eclipse season ==
This eclipse is part of an eclipse season, a period, roughly every six months, when eclipses occur. Only two (or occasionally three) eclipse seasons occur each year, and each season lasts about 35 days and repeats just short of six months (173 days) later; thus two full eclipse seasons always occur each year. Either two or three eclipses happen each eclipse season. In the sequence below, each eclipse is separated by a fortnight.

Eclipse season of November 1993
November 13 Ascending node (new moon)	November 29 Descending node (full moon)
Partial solar eclipse Solar Saros 123	Total lunar eclipse Lunar Saros 135

== Related eclipses ==
=== Eclipses in 1993 ===
- A partial solar eclipse on May 21.
- A total lunar eclipse on June 4.
- A partial solar eclipse on November 13.
- A total lunar eclipse on November 29.

=== Metonic ===
- Preceded by: Lunar eclipse of February 9, 1990
- Followed by: Lunar eclipse of September 16, 1997

=== Tzolkinex ===
- Preceded by: Lunar eclipse of October 17, 1986
- Followed by: Lunar eclipse of January 9, 2001

=== Half-Saros ===
- Preceded by: Solar eclipse of November 22, 1984
- Followed by: Solar eclipse of December 4, 2002

=== Tritos ===
- Preceded by: Lunar eclipse of December 30, 1982
- Followed by: Lunar eclipse of October 28, 2004

=== Lunar Saros 135 ===
- Preceded by: Lunar eclipse of November 18, 1975
- Followed by: Lunar eclipse of December 10, 2011

=== Inex ===
- Preceded by: Lunar eclipse of December 19, 1964
- Followed by: Lunar eclipse of November 8, 2022

=== Triad ===
- Preceded by: Lunar eclipse of January 29, 1907
- Followed by: Lunar eclipse of September 29, 2080

=== Lunar eclipses of 1991–1994 ===
This eclipse is a member of a semester series. An eclipse in a semester series of lunar eclipses repeats approximately every 177 days and 4 hours (a semester) at alternating nodes of the Moon's orbit.

The penumbral lunar eclipses on January 30, 1991 and July 26, 1991 occur in the previous lunar year eclipse set.

Lunar eclipse series sets from 1991 to 1994
Ascending node				Descending node			
Saros	Date Viewing	Type Chart	Gamma	Saros	Date Viewing	Type Chart	Gamma
110	1991 Jun 27	Penumbral	−1.4064	115	1991 Dec 21	Partial	0.9709
120	1992 Jun 15	Partial	−0.6289	125	1992 Dec 09	Total	0.3144
130	1993 Jun 04	Total	0.1638	135	1993 Nov 29	Total	−0.3994
140	1994 May 25	Partial	0.8933	145	1994 Nov 18	Penumbral	−1.1048

=== Saros 135 ===
This eclipse is a part of Saros series 135, repeating every 18 years, 11 days, and containing 71 events. The series started with a penumbral lunar eclipse on April 13, 1615. It contains partial eclipses from July 20, 1777 through October 28, 1939; total eclipses from November 7, 1957 through July 6, 2354; and a second set of partial eclipses from July 16, 2372 through September 19, 2480. The series ends at member 71 as a penumbral eclipse on May 18, 2877.

The longest duration of totality will be produced by member 37 at 106 minutes, 13 seconds on May 12, 2264. All eclipses in this series occur at the Moon’s descending node of orbit.

Greatest	First			
The greatest eclipse of the series will occur on 2264 May 12, lasting 106 minutes, 13 seconds.	Penumbral	Partial	Total	Central
The greatest eclipse of the series will occur on 2264 May 12, lasting 106 minutes, 13 seconds.	1615 Apr 13	1777 Jul 20	1957 Nov 07	2174 Mar 18
The greatest eclipse of the series will occur on 2264 May 12, lasting 106 minutes, 13 seconds.	Last			
The greatest eclipse of the series will occur on 2264 May 12, lasting 106 minutes, 13 seconds.	Central	Total	Partial	Penumbral
The greatest eclipse of the series will occur on 2264 May 12, lasting 106 minutes, 13 seconds.	2318 Jun 14	2354 Jul 06	2480 Sep 19	2877 May 18

Eclipses are tabulated in three columns; every third eclipse in the same column is one exeligmos apart, so they all cast shadows over approximately the same parts of the Earth.

Series members 12–33 occur between 1801 and 2200:
12	13	14
1813 Aug 12	1831 Aug 23	1849 Sep 02
15	16	17
1867 Sep 14	1885 Sep 24	1903 Oct 06
18	19	20
1921 Oct 16	1939 Oct 28	1957 Nov 07
21	22	23
1975 Nov 18	1993 Nov 29	2011 Dec 10
24	25	26
2029 Dec 20	2048 Jan 01	2066 Jan 11
27	28	29
2084 Jan 22	2102 Feb 03	2120 Feb 14
30	31	32
2138 Feb 24	2156 Mar 07	2174 Mar 18
33
2192 Mar 28

=== Tritos series ===
This eclipse is a part of a tritos cycle, repeating at alternating nodes every 135 synodic months (≈ 3986.63 days, or 11 years minus 1 month). Their appearance and longitude are irregular due to a lack of synchronization with the anomalistic month (period of perigee), but groupings of 3 tritos cycles (≈ 33 years minus 3 months) come close (≈ 434.044 anomalistic months), so eclipses are similar in these groupings.

Series members between 1801 and 2200
1808 May 10 (Saros 118)	1819 Apr 10 (Saros 119)	1830 Mar 09 (Saros 120)	1841 Feb 06 (Saros 121)	1852 Jan 07 (Saros 122)
1862 Dec 06 (Saros 123)	1873 Nov 04 (Saros 124)	1884 Oct 04 (Saros 125)	1895 Sep 04 (Saros 126)	1906 Aug 04 (Saros 127)
1917 Jul 04 (Saros 128)	1928 Jun 03 (Saros 129)	1939 May 03 (Saros 130)	1950 Apr 02 (Saros 131)	1961 Mar 02 (Saros 132)
1972 Jan 30 (Saros 133)	1982 Dec 30 (Saros 134)	1993 Nov 29 (Saros 135)	2004 Oct 28 (Saros 136)	2015 Sep 28 (Saros 137)
2026 Aug 28 (Saros 138)	2037 Jul 27 (Saros 139)	2048 Jun 26 (Saros 140)	2059 May 27 (Saros 141)	2070 Apr 25 (Saros 142)
2081 Mar 25 (Saros 143)	2092 Feb 23 (Saros 144)	2103 Jan 23 (Saros 145)	2113 Dec 22 (Saros 146)	2124 Nov 21 (Saros 147)
2135 Oct 22 (Saros 148)	2146 Sep 20 (Saros 149)	2157 Aug 20 (Saros 150)	2168 Jul 20 (Saros 151)	2179 Jun 19 (Saros 152)
2190 May 19 (Saros 153)

=== Inex series ===
This eclipse is a part of the long period inex cycle, repeating at alternating nodes, every 358 synodic months (≈ 10,571.95 days, or 29 years minus 20 days). Their appearance and longitude are irregular due to a lack of synchronization with the anomalistic month (period of perigee). However, groupings of 3 inex cycles (≈ 87 years minus 2 months) comes close (≈ 1,151.02 anomalistic months), so eclipses are similar in these groupings.

Series members between 1801 and 2200
1820 Mar 29 (Saros 129)	1849 Mar 09 (Saros 130)	1878 Feb 17 (Saros 131)
1907 Jan 29 (Saros 132)	1936 Jan 08 (Saros 133)	1964 Dec 19 (Saros 134)
1993 Nov 29 (Saros 135)	2022 Nov 08 (Saros 136)	2051 Oct 19 (Saros 137)
2080 Sep 29 (Saros 138)	2109 Sep 09 (Saros 139)	2138 Aug 20 (Saros 140)
2167 Aug 01 (Saros 141)	2196 Jul 10 (Saros 142)	

=== Half-Saros cycle ===
A lunar eclipse will be preceded and followed by solar eclipses by 9 years and 5.5 days (a half saros). This lunar eclipse is related to two total solar eclipses of Solar Saros 142.

November 22, 1984	December 4, 2002

== See also ==
- List of lunar eclipses
- List of 20th-century lunar eclipses
