= Solar eclipse of September 7, 1858 =

Total eclipse

- Total eclipse
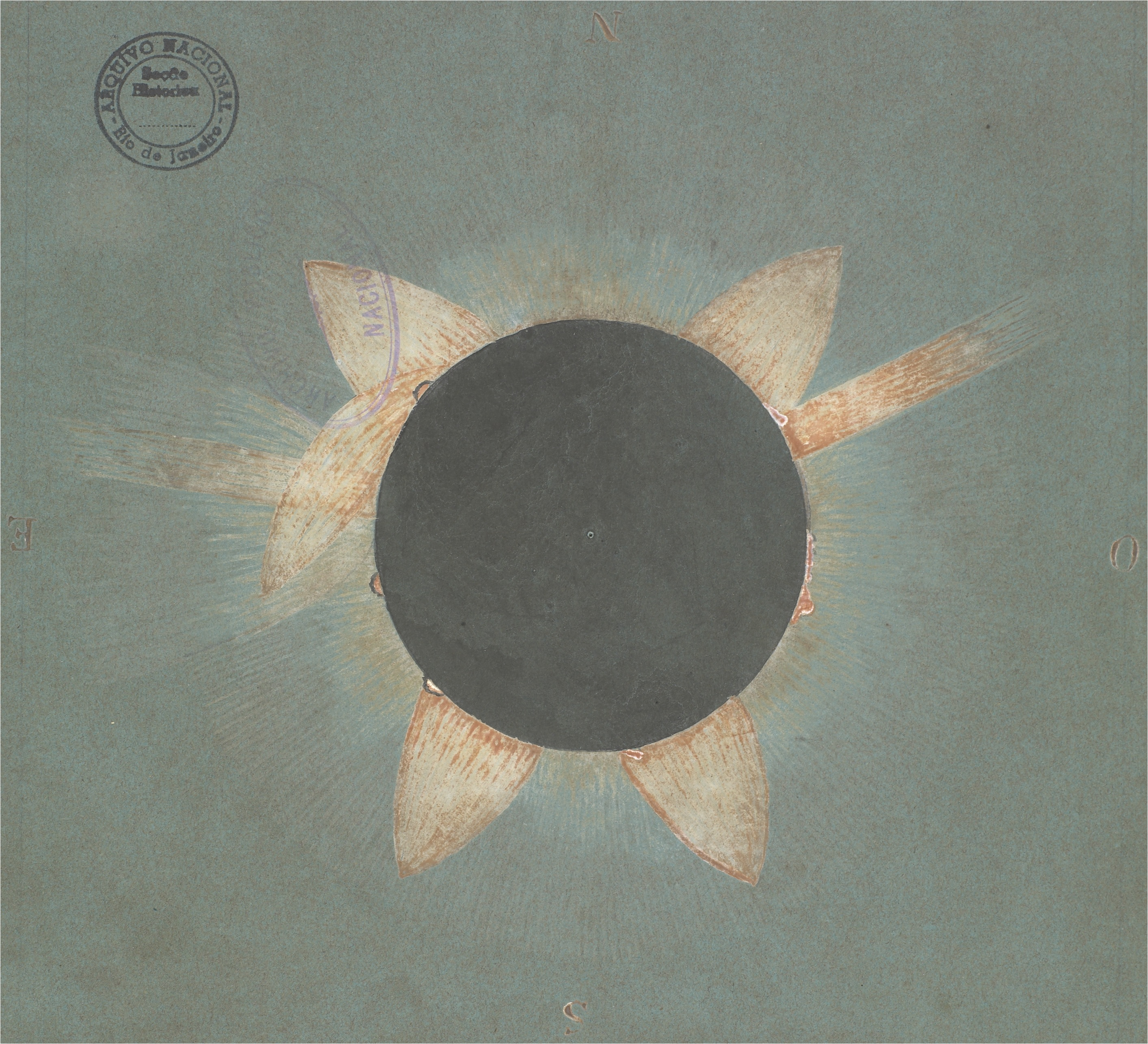
- Emmanuel Liais from Brazil

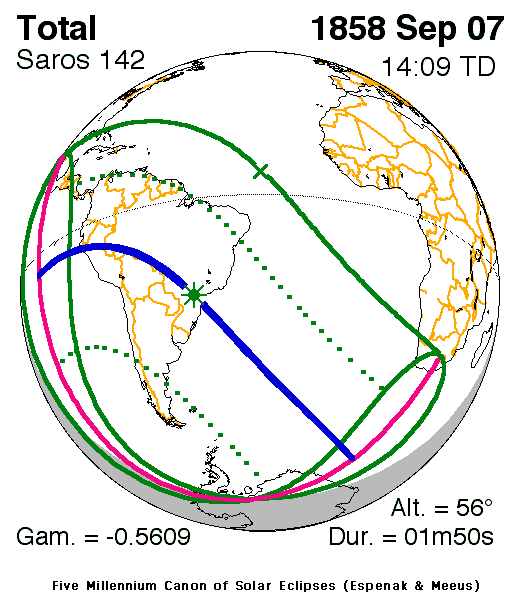
- Map
- Gamma: −0.5609
- Magnitude: 1.021

Maximum eclipse
- Duration: 110 s (1 min 50 s)
- Coordinates: 23.9°S 49.8°W
- Max. width of band: 85 km (53 mi)

Times (UTC)
- Greatest eclipse: 14:09:29

References
- Saros: 142 (14 of 72)
- Catalog # (SE5000): 9182

A total solar eclipse occurred at the Moon's descending node of orbit on Tuesday, September 7, 1858, with a magnitude of 1.0210. A solar eclipse occurs when the Moon passes between Earth and the Sun, thereby totally or partly obscuring the image of the Sun for a viewer on Earth. A total solar eclipse occurs when the Moon's apparent diameter is larger than the Sun's, blocking all direct sunlight, turning day into darkness. Totality occurs in a narrow path across Earth's surface, with the partial solar eclipse visible over a surrounding region thousands of kilometres wide. Occurring about 2.5 days after perigee (on September 4, 1858, at 2:10 UTC), the Moon's apparent diameter was larger.

The path of totality was visible from parts of modern-day Peru, Brazil, and northern Bolivia. A partial solar eclipse was also visible for parts of Central America, the Caribbean, South America, Antarctica, and Southern Africa.

== Gallery ==
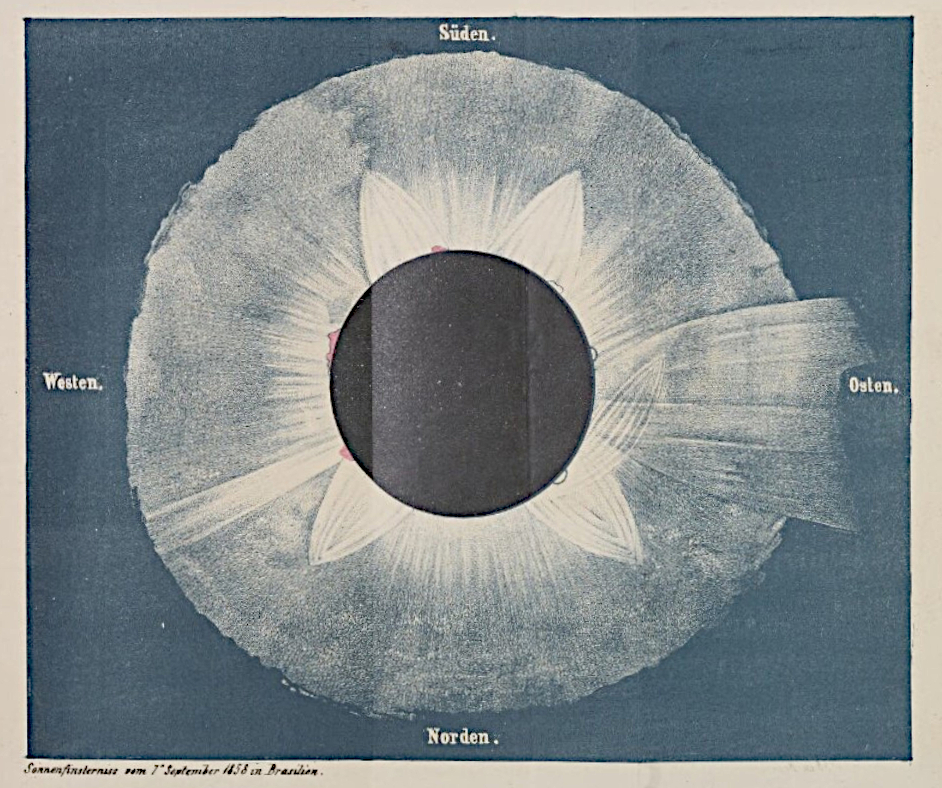

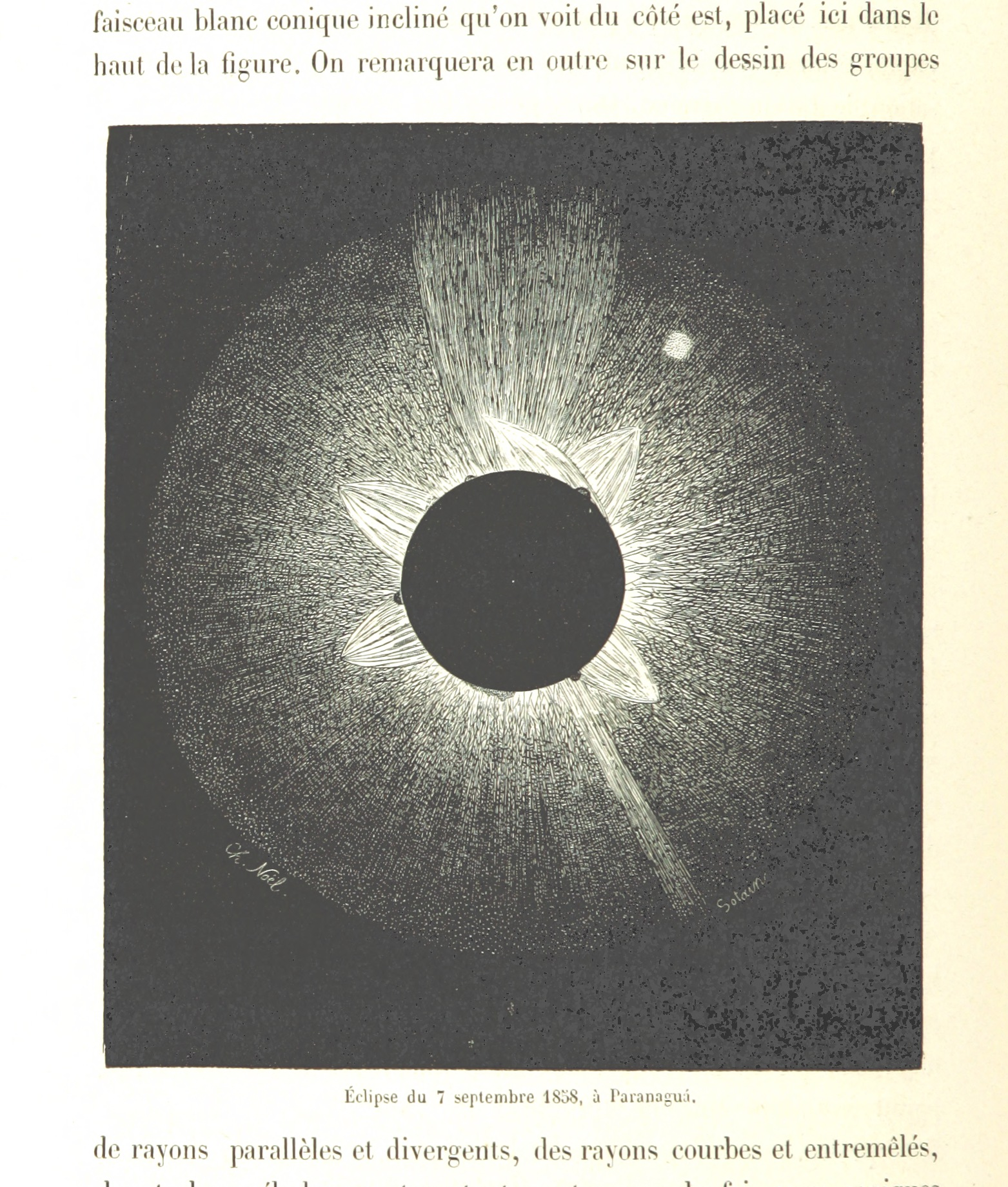

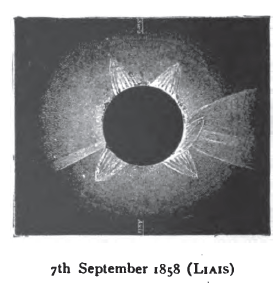

== Eclipse details ==
Shown below are two tables displaying details about this particular solar eclipse. The first table outlines times at which the Moon's penumbra or umbra attains the specific parameter, and the second table describes various other parameters pertaining to this eclipse.

September 7, 1858 Solar Eclipse Times
Event	Time (UTC)
First Penumbral External Contact	1858 September 07 at 11:34:17.6 UTC
First Umbral External Contact	1858 September 07 at 12:39:54.7 UTC
First Central Line	1858 September 07 at 12:40:10.2 UTC
First Umbral Internal Contact	1858 September 07 at 12:40:25.7 UTC
Greatest Duration	1858 September 07 at 14:05:24.4 UTC
Greatest Eclipse	1858 September 07 at 14:09:28.7 UTC
Ecliptic Conjunction	1858 September 07 at 14:15:28.9 UTC
Equatorial Conjunction	1858 September 07 at 14:42:09.6 UTC
Last Umbral Internal Contact	1858 September 07 at 15:38:14.5 UTC
Last Central Line	1858 September 07 at 15:38:27.4 UTC
Last Umbral External Contact	1858 September 07 at 15:38:40.2 UTC
Last Penumbral External Contact	1858 September 07 at 16:44:32.4 UTC

September 7, 1858 Solar Eclipse Parameters
Parameter	Value
Eclipse Magnitude	1.02096
Eclipse Obscuration	1.04236
Gamma	−0.56091
Sun Right Ascension	11h03m21.8s
Sun Declination	+06°03'35.0"
Sun Semi-Diameter	15'52.9"
Sun Equatorial Horizontal Parallax	08.7"
Moon Right Ascension	11h02m19.1s
Moon Declination	+05°34'40.7"
Moon Semi-Diameter	15'59.8"
Moon Equatorial Horizontal Parallax	0°58'42.5"
ΔT	7.1 s

== Eclipse season ==
This eclipse is part of an eclipse season, a period, roughly every six months, when eclipses occur. Only two (or occasionally three) eclipse seasons occur each year, and each season lasts about 35 days and repeats just short of six months (173 days) later; thus two full eclipse seasons always occur each year. Either two or three eclipses happen each eclipse season. In the sequence below, each eclipse is separated by a fortnight.

Eclipse season of August–September 1858
August 24 Ascending node (full moon)	September 7 Descending node (new moon)
Partial lunar eclipse Lunar Saros 116	Total solar eclipse Solar Saros 142

== Related eclipses ==
=== Eclipses in 1858 ===
- A partial lunar eclipse on February 27.
- An annular solar eclipse on March 15.
- A partial lunar eclipse on August 24.
- An total solar eclipse on September 7.

=== Metonic ===
- Preceded by: Solar eclipse of November 20, 1854
- Followed by: Solar eclipse of June 27, 1862

=== Tzolkinex ===
- Preceded by: Solar eclipse of July 28, 1851
- Followed by: Solar eclipse of October 19, 1865

=== Half-Saros ===
- Preceded by: Lunar eclipse of September 2, 1849
- Followed by: Lunar eclipse of September 14, 1867

=== Tritos ===
- Preceded by: Solar eclipse of October 9, 1847
- Followed by: Solar eclipse of August 7, 1869

=== Solar Saros 142 ===
- Preceded by: Solar eclipse of August 27, 1840
- Followed by: Solar eclipse of September 17, 1876

=== Inex ===
- Preceded by: Solar eclipse of September 28, 1829
- Followed by: Solar eclipse of August 19, 1887

=== Triad ===
- Preceded by: Solar eclipse of November 6, 1771
- Followed by: Solar eclipse of July 9, 1945

=== Solar eclipses of 1856–1859 ===
This eclipse is a member of a semester series. An eclipse in a semester series of solar eclipses repeats approximately every 177 days and 4 hours (a semester) at alternating nodes of the Moon's orbit.

The partial solar eclipses on February 3, 1859 and July 29, 1859 occur in the next lunar year eclipse set.

Solar eclipse series sets from 1856 to 1859
Ascending node			Descending node		
Saros	Map	Gamma	Saros	Map	Gamma
117	April 5, 1856 Total	−0.7906	122	September 29, 1856 Annular	0.9420
127	March 25, 1857 Total	−0.0892	132	September 18, 1857 Annular	0.1912
137	March 15, 1858 Annular	0.6461	142	September 7, 1858 Total	−0.5609
147	March 4, 1859 Partial	1.4192	152	August 28, 1859 Partial	−1.2569

=== Saros 142 ===
This eclipse is a part of Saros series 142, repeating every 18 years, 11 days, and containing 72 events. The series started with a partial solar eclipse on April 17, 1624. It contains a hybrid eclipse on July 14, 1768, and total eclipses from July 25, 1786 through October 29, 2543. There are no annular eclipses in this set. The series ends at member 72 as a partial eclipse on June 5, 2904. Its eclipses are tabulated in three columns; every third eclipse in the same column is one exeligmos apart, so they all cast shadows over approximately the same parts of the Earth.

The longest duration of totality will be produced by member 38 at 6 minutes, 34 seconds on May 28, 2291. All eclipses in this series occur at the Moon’s descending node of orbit.

Series members 11–32 occur between 1801 and 2200:
11	12	13
August 5, 1804	August 16, 1822	August 27, 1840
14	15	16
September 7, 1858	September 17, 1876	September 29, 1894
17	18	19
October 10, 1912	October 21, 1930	November 1, 1948
20	21	22
November 12, 1966	November 22, 1984	December 4, 2002
23	24	25
December 14, 2020	December 26, 2038	January 5, 2057
26	27	28
January 16, 2075	January 27, 2093	February 8, 2111
29	30	31
February 18, 2129	March 2, 2147	March 12, 2165
32
March 23, 2183

=== Metonic series ===
The metonic series repeats eclipses every 19 years (6939.69 days), lasting about 5 cycles. Eclipses occur in nearly the same calendar date. In addition, the octon subseries repeats 1/5 of that or every 3.8 years (1387.94 days). All eclipses in this table occur at the Moon's descending node.

22 eclipse events between September 8, 1801 and September 7, 1877
September 7–8	June 26–27	April 14–15	January 31–February 1	November 19–20
112	114	116	118	120
September 8, 1801	June 26, 1805	April 14, 1809	February 1, 1813	November 19, 1816
122	124	126	128	130
September 7, 1820	June 26, 1824	April 14, 1828	February 1, 1832	November 20, 1835
132	134	136	138	140
September 7, 1839	June 27, 1843	April 15, 1847	February 1, 1851	November 20, 1854
142	144	146	148	150
September 7, 1858	June 27, 1862	April 15, 1866	January 31, 1870	November 20, 1873
152
September 7, 1877

=== Tritos series ===
This eclipse is a part of a tritos cycle, repeating at alternating nodes every 135 synodic months (≈ 3986.63 days, or 11 years minus 1 month). Their appearance and longitude are irregular due to a lack of synchronization with the anomalistic month (period of perigee), but groupings of 3 tritos cycles (≈ 33 years minus 3 months) come close (≈ 434.044 anomalistic months), so eclipses are similar in these groupings.

The partial solar eclipse on October 24, 2098 (part of Saros 164) is also a part of this series but is not included in the table below.

Series members between 1801 and 2011
February 11, 1804 (Saros 137)	January 10, 1815 (Saros 138)	December 9, 1825 (Saros 139)	November 9, 1836 (Saros 140)	October 9, 1847 (Saros 141)
September 7, 1858 (Saros 142)	August 7, 1869 (Saros 143)	July 7, 1880 (Saros 144)	June 6, 1891 (Saros 145)	May 7, 1902 (Saros 146)
April 6, 1913 (Saros 147)	March 5, 1924 (Saros 148)	February 3, 1935 (Saros 149)	January 3, 1946 (Saros 150)	December 2, 1956 (Saros 151)
November 2, 1967 (Saros 152)	October 2, 1978 (Saros 153)	August 31, 1989 (Saros 154)	July 31, 2000 (Saros 155)	July 1, 2011 (Saros 156)

=== Inex series ===
This eclipse is a part of the long period inex cycle, repeating at alternating nodes, every 358 synodic months (≈ 10,571.95 days, or 29 years minus 20 days). Their appearance and longitude are irregular due to a lack of synchronization with the anomalistic month (period of perigee). However, groupings of 3 inex cycles (≈ 87 years minus 2 months) comes close (≈ 1,151.02 anomalistic months), so eclipses are similar in these groupings.

Series members between 1801 and 2200
September 28, 1829 (Saros 141)	September 7, 1858 (Saros 142)	August 19, 1887 (Saros 143)
July 30, 1916 (Saros 144)	July 9, 1945 (Saros 145)	June 20, 1974 (Saros 146)
May 31, 2003 (Saros 147)	May 9, 2032 (Saros 148)	April 20, 2061 (Saros 149)
March 31, 2090 (Saros 150)	March 11, 2119 (Saros 151)	February 19, 2148 (Saros 152)
January 29, 2177 (Saros 153)		
