= November 1957 lunar eclipse =

Total lunar eclipse November 7, 1957

- Total eclipse
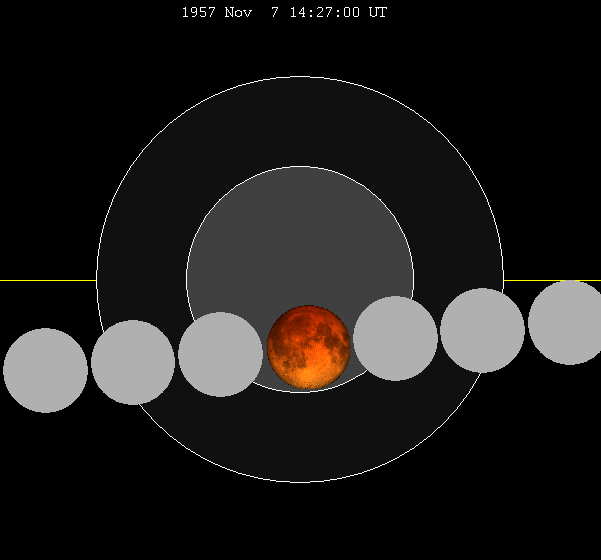
- The Moon's hourly motion shown right to left
- Date: November 7, 1957
- Gamma: −0.4332
- Magnitude: 1.0305
- Saros cycle: 135 (20 of 71)
- Totality: 27 minutes, 57 seconds
- Partiality: 206 minutes, 32 seconds
- Penumbral: 349 minutes, 21 seconds
Contacts (UTC)
- P1: 11:32:15
- U1: 12:43:43
- U2: 14:13:01
- Greatest: 14:26:58
- U3: 14:40:57
- U4: 16:10:15
- P4: 17:21:36

A total lunar eclipse occurred at the Moon’s descending node of orbit on Thursday, November 7, 1957, with an umbral magnitude of 1.0305. A lunar eclipse occurs when the Moon moves into the Earth's shadow, causing the Moon to be darkened. A total lunar eclipse occurs when the Moon's near side entirely passes into the Earth's umbral shadow. Unlike a solar eclipse, which can only be viewed from a relatively small area of the world, a lunar eclipse may be viewed from anywhere on the night side of Earth. A total lunar eclipse can last up to nearly two hours, while a total solar eclipse lasts only a few minutes at any given place, because the Moon's shadow is smaller. Occurring about 5.1 days after apogee (on November 2, 1957, at 11:30 UTC), the Moon's apparent diameter was smaller.

This lunar eclipse was the last of an almost tetrad, with the others being on May 24, 1956 (partial); November 18, 1956 (total); and May 13, 1957 (total).

== Visibility ==
The eclipse was completely visible over the eastern half of Asia, Australia, and Alaska, seen rising over the western half of Asia, Europe, and much of central and east Africa and setting over much of North America.

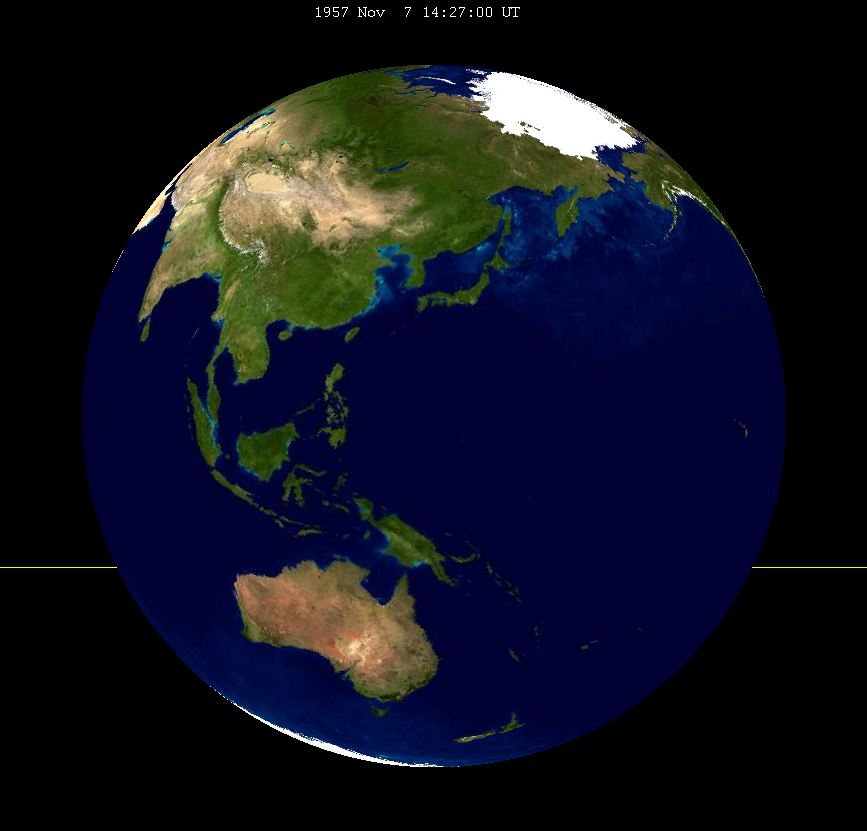
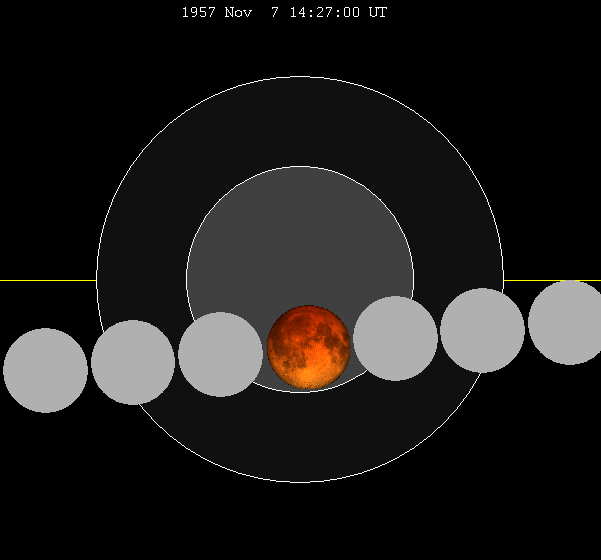

== Eclipse details ==
Shown below is a table displaying details about this particular solar eclipse. It describes various parameters pertaining to this eclipse.

November 7, 1957 Lunar Eclipse Parameters
Parameter	Value
Penumbral Magnitude	2.09628
Umbral Magnitude	1.03050
Gamma	−0.43321
Sun Right Ascension	14h49m49.6s
Sun Declination	-16°18'55.4"
Sun Semi-Diameter	16'08.6"
Sun Equatorial Horizontal Parallax	08.9"
Moon Right Ascension	02h50m09.3s
Moon Declination	+15°55'18.7"
Moon Semi-Diameter	15'08.8"
Moon Equatorial Horizontal Parallax	0°55'35.5"
ΔT	32.2 s

== Eclipse season ==
This eclipse is part of an eclipse season, a period, roughly every six months, when eclipses occur. Only two (or occasionally three) eclipse seasons occur each year, and each season lasts about 35 days and repeats just short of six months (173 days) later; thus two full eclipse seasons always occur each year. Either two or three eclipses happen each eclipse season. In the sequence below, each eclipse is separated by a fortnight.

Eclipse season of October–November 1957
October 23 Ascending node (new moon)	November 7 Descending node (full moon)
Total solar eclipse Solar Saros 123	Total lunar eclipse Lunar Saros 135

== Related eclipses ==
=== Eclipses in 1957 ===
- A non-central annular solar eclipse on April 30.
- A total lunar eclipse on May 13.
- A non-central total solar eclipse on October 23.
- A total lunar eclipse on November 7.

=== Metonic ===
- Preceded by: Lunar eclipse of January 19, 1954
- Followed by: Lunar eclipse of August 26, 1961

=== Tzolkinex ===
- Preceded by: Lunar eclipse of September 26, 1950
- Followed by: Lunar eclipse of December 19, 1964

=== Half-Saros ===
- Preceded by: Solar eclipse of November 1, 1948
- Followed by: Solar eclipse of November 12, 1966

=== Tritos ===
- Preceded by: Lunar eclipse of December 8, 1946
- Followed by: Lunar eclipse of October 6, 1968

=== Lunar Saros 135 ===
- Preceded by: Lunar eclipse of October 28, 1939
- Followed by: Lunar eclipse of November 18, 1975

=== Inex ===
- Preceded by: Lunar eclipse of November 27, 1928
- Followed by: Lunar eclipse of October 17, 1986

=== Triad ===
- Preceded by: Lunar eclipse of January 6, 1871
- Followed by: Lunar eclipse of September 7, 2044

=== Lunar eclipses of 1955–1958 ===
This eclipse is a member of a semester series. An eclipse in a semester series of lunar eclipses repeats approximately every 177 days and 4 hours (a semester) at alternating nodes of the Moon's orbit.

The penumbral lunar eclipse on January 8, 1955 occurs in the previous lunar year eclipse set, and the penumbral lunar eclipse on April 4, 1958 occurs in the next lunar year eclipse set.

Lunar eclipse series sets from 1955 to 1958
Ascending node				Descending node			
Saros	Date Viewing	Type Chart	Gamma	Saros	Date Viewing	Type Chart	Gamma
110	1955 Jun 05	Penumbral	−1.2384	115	1955 Nov 29	Partial	0.9551
120	1956 May 24	Partial	−0.4726	125	1956 Nov 18	Total	0.2917
130	1957 May 13	Total	0.3046	135	1957 Nov 07	Total	−0.4332
140	1958 May 03	Partial	1.0188	145	1958 Oct 27	Penumbral	−1.1571

=== Saros 135 ===
This eclipse is a part of Saros series 135, repeating every 18 years, 11 days, and containing 71 events. The series started with a penumbral lunar eclipse on April 13, 1615. It contains partial eclipses from July 20, 1777 through October 28, 1939; total eclipses from November 7, 1957 through July 6, 2354; and a second set of partial eclipses from July 16, 2372 through September 19, 2480. The series ends at member 71 as a penumbral eclipse on May 18, 2877.

The longest duration of totality will be produced by member 37 at 106 minutes, 13 seconds on May 12, 2264. All eclipses in this series occur at the Moon’s descending node of orbit.

Greatest	First			
The greatest eclipse of the series will occur on 2264 May 12, lasting 106 minutes, 13 seconds.	Penumbral	Partial	Total	Central
The greatest eclipse of the series will occur on 2264 May 12, lasting 106 minutes, 13 seconds.	1615 Apr 13	1777 Jul 20	1957 Nov 07	2174 Mar 18
The greatest eclipse of the series will occur on 2264 May 12, lasting 106 minutes, 13 seconds.	Last			
The greatest eclipse of the series will occur on 2264 May 12, lasting 106 minutes, 13 seconds.	Central	Total	Partial	Penumbral
The greatest eclipse of the series will occur on 2264 May 12, lasting 106 minutes, 13 seconds.	2318 Jun 14	2354 Jul 06	2480 Sep 19	2877 May 18

Eclipses are tabulated in three columns; every third eclipse in the same column is one exeligmos apart, so they all cast shadows over approximately the same parts of the Earth.

Series members 12–33 occur between 1801 and 2200:
12	13	14
1813 Aug 12	1831 Aug 23	1849 Sep 02
15	16	17
1867 Sep 14	1885 Sep 24	1903 Oct 06
18	19	20
1921 Oct 16	1939 Oct 28	1957 Nov 07
21	22	23
1975 Nov 18	1993 Nov 29	2011 Dec 10
24	25	26
2029 Dec 20	2048 Jan 01	2066 Jan 11
27	28	29
2084 Jan 22	2102 Feb 03	2120 Feb 14
30	31	32
2138 Feb 24	2156 Mar 07	2174 Mar 18
33
2192 Mar 28

=== Tritos series ===
This eclipse is a part of a tritos cycle, repeating at alternating nodes every 135 synodic months (≈ 3986.63 days, or 11 years minus 1 month). Their appearance and longitude are irregular due to a lack of synchronization with the anomalistic month (period of perigee), but groupings of 3 tritos cycles (≈ 33 years minus 3 months) come close (≈ 434.044 anomalistic months), so eclipses are similar in these groupings.

Series members between 1801 and 2187
1805 Jan 15 (Saros 121)	1815 Dec 16 (Saros 122)	1826 Nov 14 (Saros 123)	1837 Oct 13 (Saros 124)	1848 Sep 13 (Saros 125)
1859 Aug 13 (Saros 126)	1870 Jul 12 (Saros 127)	1881 Jun 12 (Saros 128)	1892 May 11 (Saros 129)	1903 Apr 12 (Saros 130)
1914 Mar 12 (Saros 131)	1925 Feb 08 (Saros 132)	1936 Jan 08 (Saros 133)	1946 Dec 08 (Saros 134)	1957 Nov 07 (Saros 135)
1968 Oct 06 (Saros 136)	1979 Sep 06 (Saros 137)	1990 Aug 06 (Saros 138)	2001 Jul 05 (Saros 139)	2012 Jun 04 (Saros 140)
2023 May 05 (Saros 141)	2034 Apr 03 (Saros 142)	2045 Mar 03 (Saros 143)	2056 Feb 01 (Saros 144)	2066 Dec 31 (Saros 145)
2077 Nov 29 (Saros 146)	2088 Oct 30 (Saros 147)	2099 Sep 29 (Saros 148)	2110 Aug 29 (Saros 149)	2121 Jul 30 (Saros 150)
2132 Jun 28 (Saros 151)	2143 May 28 (Saros 152)	2154 Apr 28 (Saros 153)		
2187 Jan 24 (Saros 156)

=== Inex series ===
This eclipse is a part of the long period inex cycle, repeating at alternating nodes, every 358 synodic months (≈ 10,571.95 days, or 29 years minus 20 days). Their appearance and longitude are irregular due to a lack of synchronization with the anomalistic month (period of perigee). However, groupings of 3 inex cycles (≈ 87 years minus 2 months) comes close (≈ 1,151.02 anomalistic months), so eclipses are similar in these groupings.

Series members between 1801 and 2200
1813 Feb 15 (Saros 130)	1842 Jan 26 (Saros 131)	1871 Jan 06 (Saros 132)
1899 Dec 17 (Saros 133)	1928 Nov 27 (Saros 134)	1957 Nov 07 (Saros 135)
1986 Oct 17 (Saros 136)	2015 Sep 28 (Saros 137)	2044 Sep 07 (Saros 138)
2073 Aug 17 (Saros 139)	2102 Jul 30 (Saros 140)	2131 Jul 10 (Saros 141)
2160 Jun 18 (Saros 142)	2189 May 29 (Saros 143)	

=== Half-Saros cycle ===
A lunar eclipse will be preceded and followed by solar eclipses by 9 years and 5.5 days (a half saros). This lunar eclipse is related to two total solar eclipses of Solar Saros 142.

November 1, 1948	November 12, 1966

== See also ==
- List of lunar eclipses
- List of 20th-century lunar eclipses
