= November 1975 lunar eclipse =

Total lunar eclipse November 18, 1975

- Total eclipse
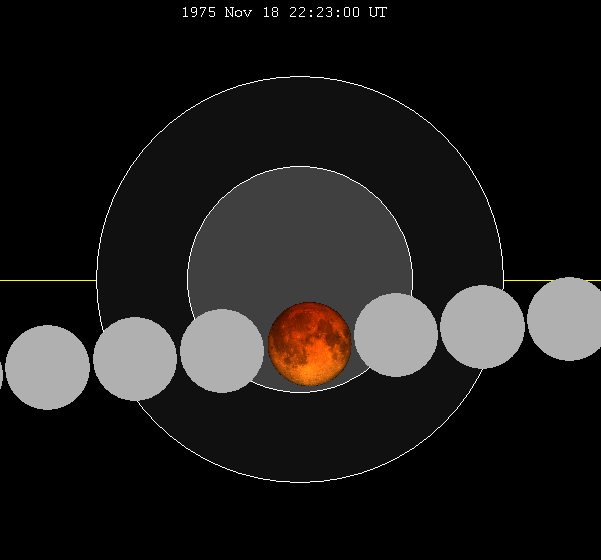
- The Moon's hourly motion shown right to left
- Date: November 18, 1975
- Gamma: −0.4134
- Magnitude: 1.0642
- Saros cycle: 135 (21 of 71)
- Totality: 40 minutes, 11 seconds
- Partiality: 209 minutes, 0 seconds
- Penumbral: 352 minutes, 7 seconds
Contacts (UTC)
- P1: 19:27:20
- U1: 20:38:57
- U2: 22:03:22
- Greatest: 22:23:26
- U3: 22:43:33
- U4: 0:07:58
- P4: 1:19:27

External image
- https://cdn.mos.cms.futurecdn.net/NcBUPUeut6brVGhzLYc3KH-1113-80.jpg

A total lunar eclipse occurred at the Moon’s descending node of orbit on Tuesday, November 18, 1975, with an umbral magnitude of 1.0642. A lunar eclipse occurs when the Moon moves into the Earth's shadow, causing the Moon to be darkened. A total lunar eclipse occurs when the Moon's near side entirely passes into the Earth's umbral shadow. Unlike a solar eclipse, which can only be viewed from a relatively small area of the world, a lunar eclipse may be viewed from anywhere on the night side of Earth. A total lunar eclipse can last up to nearly two hours, while a total solar eclipse lasts only a few minutes at any given place, because the Moon's shadow is smaller. Occurring about 4.9 days after apogee (on November 14, 1975, at 0:00 UTC), the Moon's apparent diameter was smaller.

== Visibility ==
The eclipse was completely visible over Africa, Europe, and the western half of Asia, seen rising over North and South America and setting over east and southeast Asia, and Australia.

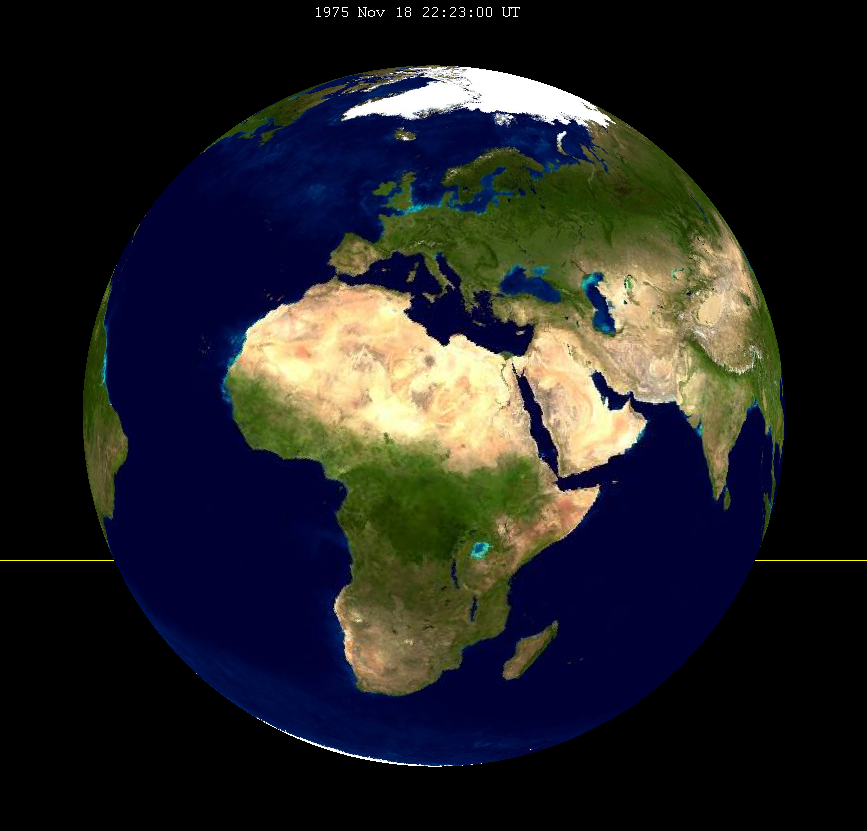
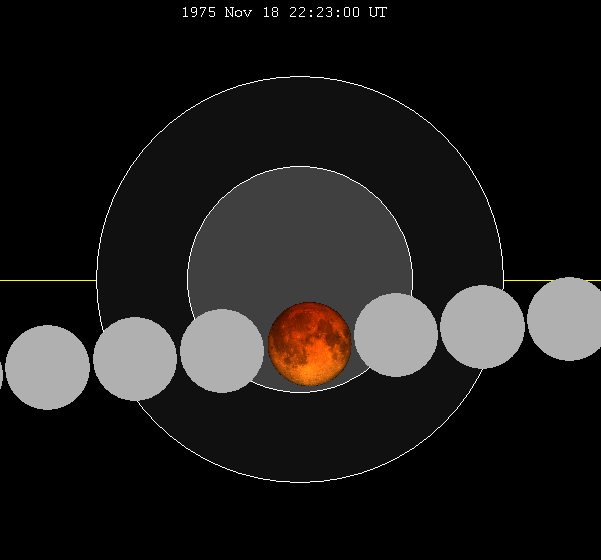

== Eclipse details ==
Shown below is a table displaying details about this particular lunar eclipse. It describes various parameters pertaining to this eclipse.

November 18, 1975 Lunar Eclipse Parameters
Parameter	Value
Penumbral Magnitude	2.13521
Umbral Magnitude	1.06421
Gamma	−0.41343
Sun Right Ascension	15h34m32.1s
Sun Declination	-19°14'45.6"
Sun Semi-Diameter	16'11.0"
Sun Equatorial Horizontal Parallax	08.9"
Moon Right Ascension	03h34m45.4s
Moon Declination	+18°52'03.2"
Moon Semi-Diameter	15'06.6"
Moon Equatorial Horizontal Parallax	0°55'27.2"
ΔT	46.4 s

== Eclipse season ==
This eclipse is part of an eclipse season, a period, roughly every six months, when eclipses occur. Only two (or occasionally three) eclipse seasons occur each year, and each season lasts about 35 days and repeats just short of six months (173 days) later; thus two full eclipse seasons always occur each year. Either two or three eclipses happen each eclipse season. In the sequence below, each eclipse is separated by a fortnight.

Eclipse season of November 1975
November 3 Ascending node (new moon)	November 18 Descending node (full moon)
Partial solar eclipse Solar Saros 123	Total lunar eclipse Lunar Saros 135

== Related eclipses ==
=== Eclipses in 1975 ===
- A partial solar eclipse on May 11.
- A total lunar eclipse on May 25.
- A partial solar eclipse on November 3.
- A total lunar eclipse on November 18.

=== Metonic ===
- Preceded by: Lunar eclipse of January 30, 1972
- Followed by: Lunar eclipse of September 6, 1979

=== Tzolkinex ===
- Preceded by: Lunar eclipse of October 6, 1968
- Followed by: Lunar eclipse of December 30, 1982

=== Half-Saros ===
- Preceded by: Solar eclipse of November 12, 1966
- Followed by: Solar eclipse of November 22, 1984

=== Tritos ===
- Preceded by: Lunar eclipse of December 19, 1964
- Followed by: Lunar eclipse of October 17, 1986

=== Lunar Saros 135 ===
- Preceded by: Lunar eclipse of November 7, 1957
- Followed by: Lunar eclipse of November 29, 1993

=== Inex ===
- Preceded by: Lunar eclipse of December 8, 1946
- Followed by: Lunar eclipse of October 28, 2004

=== Triad ===
- Preceded by: Lunar eclipse of January 17, 1889
- Followed by: Lunar eclipse of September 18, 2062

=== Lunar eclipses of 1973–1976 ===
This eclipse is a member of a semester series. An eclipse in a semester series of lunar eclipses repeats approximately every 177 days and 4 hours (a semester) at alternating nodes of the Moon's orbit.

The penumbral lunar eclipses on January 18, 1973 and July 15, 1973 occur in the previous lunar year eclipse set.

Lunar eclipse series sets from 1973 to 1976
Ascending node				Descending node			
Saros	Date Viewing	Type Chart	Gamma	Saros	Date Viewing	Type Chart	Gamma
110	1973 Jun 15	Penumbral	−1.3217	115	1973 Dec 10	Partial	0.9644
120	1974 Jun 04	Partial	−0.5489	125	1974 Nov 29	Total	0.3054
130	1975 May 25	Total	0.2367	135	1975 Nov 18	Total	−0.4134
140	1976 May 13	Partial	0.9586	145	1976 Nov 06	Penumbral	−1.1276

=== Saros 135 ===
This eclipse is a part of Saros series 135, repeating every 18 years, 11 days, and containing 71 events. The series started with a penumbral lunar eclipse on April 13, 1615. It contains partial eclipses from July 20, 1777 through October 28, 1939; total eclipses from November 7, 1957 through July 6, 2354; and a second set of partial eclipses from July 16, 2372 through September 19, 2480. The series ends at member 71 as a penumbral eclipse on May 18, 2877.

The longest duration of totality will be produced by member 37 at 106 minutes, 13 seconds on May 12, 2264. All eclipses in this series occur at the Moon’s descending node of orbit.

Greatest	First			
The greatest eclipse of the series will occur on 2264 May 12, lasting 106 minutes, 13 seconds.	Penumbral	Partial	Total	Central
The greatest eclipse of the series will occur on 2264 May 12, lasting 106 minutes, 13 seconds.	1615 Apr 13	1777 Jul 20	1957 Nov 07	2174 Mar 18
The greatest eclipse of the series will occur on 2264 May 12, lasting 106 minutes, 13 seconds.	Last			
The greatest eclipse of the series will occur on 2264 May 12, lasting 106 minutes, 13 seconds.	Central	Total	Partial	Penumbral
The greatest eclipse of the series will occur on 2264 May 12, lasting 106 minutes, 13 seconds.	2318 Jun 14	2354 Jul 06	2480 Sep 19	2877 May 18

Eclipses are tabulated in three columns; every third eclipse in the same column is one exeligmos apart, so they all cast shadows over approximately the same parts of the Earth.

Series members 12–33 occur between 1801 and 2200:
12	13	14
1813 Aug 12	1831 Aug 23	1849 Sep 02
15	16	17
1867 Sep 14	1885 Sep 24	1903 Oct 06
18	19	20
1921 Oct 16	1939 Oct 28	1957 Nov 07
21	22	23
1975 Nov 18	1993 Nov 29	2011 Dec 10
24	25	26
2029 Dec 20	2048 Jan 01	2066 Jan 11
27	28	29
2084 Jan 22	2102 Feb 03	2120 Feb 14
30	31	32
2138 Feb 24	2156 Mar 07	2174 Mar 18
33
2192 Mar 28

=== Tritos series ===
This eclipse is a part of a tritos cycle, repeating at alternating nodes every 135 synodic months (≈ 3986.63 days, or 11 years minus 1 month). Their appearance and longitude are irregular due to a lack of synchronization with the anomalistic month (period of perigee), but groupings of 3 tritos cycles (≈ 33 years minus 3 months) come close (≈ 434.044 anomalistic months), so eclipses are similar in these groupings.

Series members between 1801 and 2200
1801 Mar 30 (Saros 119)	1812 Feb 27 (Saros 120)	1823 Jan 26 (Saros 121)	1833 Dec 26 (Saros 122)	1844 Nov 24 (Saros 123)
1855 Oct 25 (Saros 124)	1866 Sep 24 (Saros 125)	1877 Aug 23 (Saros 126)	1888 Jul 23 (Saros 127)	1899 Jun 23 (Saros 128)
1910 May 24 (Saros 129)	1921 Apr 22 (Saros 130)	1932 Mar 22 (Saros 131)	1943 Feb 20 (Saros 132)	1954 Jan 19 (Saros 133)
1964 Dec 19 (Saros 134)	1975 Nov 18 (Saros 135)	1986 Oct 17 (Saros 136)	1997 Sep 16 (Saros 137)	2008 Aug 16 (Saros 138)
2019 Jul 16 (Saros 139)	2030 Jun 15 (Saros 140)	2041 May 16 (Saros 141)	2052 Apr 14 (Saros 142)	2063 Mar 14 (Saros 143)
2074 Feb 11 (Saros 144)	2085 Jan 10 (Saros 145)	2095 Dec 11 (Saros 146)	2106 Nov 11 (Saros 147)	2117 Oct 10 (Saros 148)
2128 Sep 09 (Saros 149)	2139 Aug 10 (Saros 150)	2150 Jul 09 (Saros 151)	2161 Jun 08 (Saros 152)	2172 May 08 (Saros 153)
	2194 Mar 07 (Saros 155)			

=== Inex series ===
This eclipse is a part of the long period inex cycle, repeating at alternating nodes, every 358 synodic months (≈ 10,571.95 days, or 29 years minus 20 days). Their appearance and longitude are irregular due to a lack of synchronization with the anomalistic month (period of perigee). However, groupings of 3 inex cycles (≈ 87 years minus 2 months) comes close (≈ 1,151.02 anomalistic months), so eclipses are similar in these groupings.

Series members between 1801 and 2200
1802 Mar 19 (Saros 129)	1831 Feb 26 (Saros 130)	1860 Feb 07 (Saros 131)
1889 Jan 17 (Saros 132)	1917 Dec 28 (Saros 133)	1946 Dec 08 (Saros 134)
1975 Nov 18 (Saros 135)	2004 Oct 28 (Saros 136)	2033 Oct 08 (Saros 137)
2062 Sep 18 (Saros 138)	2091 Aug 29 (Saros 139)	2120 Aug 09 (Saros 140)
2149 Jul 20 (Saros 141)	2178 Jun 30 (Saros 142)	

=== Half-Saros cycle ===
A lunar eclipse will be preceded and followed by solar eclipses by 9 years and 5.5 days (a half saros). This lunar eclipse is related to two total solar eclipses of Solar Saros 142.

November 12, 1966	November 22, 1984

== See also ==
- List of lunar eclipses
- List of 20th-century lunar eclipses
