= Lunar Saros 135 =

Cycle for lunar eclipses

Member 23
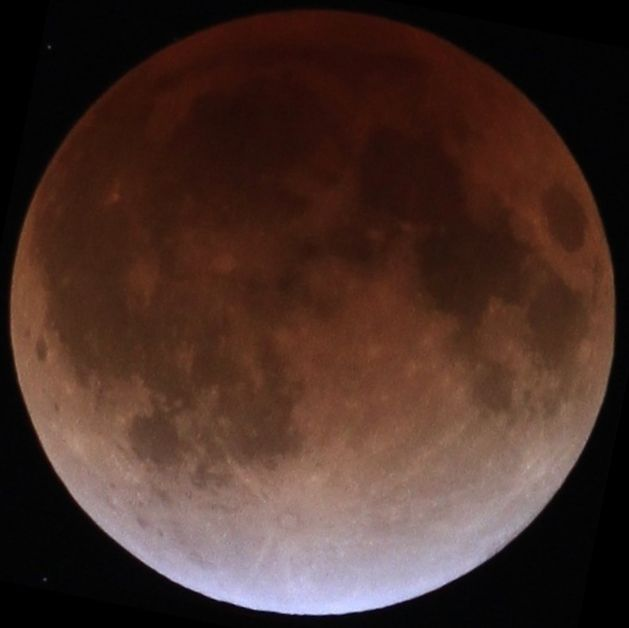
2011 Dec 10

Saros cycle series 135 for lunar eclipses occurs at the moon's descending node, repeats every 18 years 11 and 1/3 days. It contains 71 events.

This lunar saros is linked to Solar Saros 142.

This series contains 23 total eclipses. The first was on November 7, 1957, and the last will occur on July 6, 2354. The longest total eclipse will occur on May 12, 2264, and totality will last 106 minutes.

== List ==
Cat.	Saros	Mem	Date	Time UT (hr:mn)	Type	Gamma	Magnitude	Duration (min)			Contacts UT (hr:mn)						Chart
Cat.	Saros	Mem	Date	Greatest	Type	Gamma	Magnitude	Pen.	Par.	Tot.	P1	P4	U1	U2	U3	U4	Chart
08703	135	1	1615 Apr 13	19:38:31	Penumbral	-1.5327	-0.9488	55.6			19:10:43	20:06:19					
08747	135	2	1633 Apr 24	3:17:46	Penumbral	-1.4852	-0.8619	98.9			2:28:19	4:07:13					
08791	135	3	1651 May 5	10:48:41	Penumbral	-1.4321	-0.7647	130.8			9:43:17	11:54:05					
08836	135	4	1669 May 15	18:11:57	Penumbral	-1.3734	-0.6575	158.2			16:52:51	19:31:03					
08882	135	5	1687 May 27	1:28:13	Penumbral	-1.3095	-0.5410	182.7			23:56:52	2:59:34					
08928	135	6	1705 Jun 07	8:39:03	Penumbral	-1.2419	-0.4180	204.8			6:56:39	10:21:27					
08975	135	7	1723 Jun 18	15:45:35	Penumbral	-1.1715	-0.2902	224.8			13:53:11	17:37:59					
09021	135	8	1741 Jun 28	22:47:45	Penumbral	-1.0981	-0.1571	243.1			20:46:12	0:49:18					
09068	135	9	1759 Jul 10	5:48:57	Penumbral	-1.0246	-0.0240	259.5			3:39:12	7:58:42					
09114	135	10	1777 Jul 20	12:48:46	Partial	-0.9508	0.1093	274.3	75.8		10:31:37	15:05:55	12:10:52			13:26:40	
09159	135	11	1795 Jul 31	19:50:34	Partial	-0.8791	0.2387	287.3	110.4		17:26:55	22:14:13	18:55:22			20:45:46	
09204	135	12	1813 Aug 12	2:52:49	Partial	-0.8085	0.3655	299.0	134.5		0:23:19	5:22:19	1:45:34			4:00:04	
09249	135	13	1831 Aug 23	9:59:56	Partial	-0.7428	0.4833	309.1	152.4		7:25:23	12:34:29	8:43:44			11:16:08	
09296	135	14	1849 Sep 02	17:10:17	Partial	-0.6806	0.5945	317.9	166.6		14:31:20	19:49:14	15:46:59			18:33:35	
09340	135	15	1867 Sep 14	0:26:27	Partial	-0.6239	0.6956	325.5	177.8		21:43:42	3:09:12	22:57:33			1:55:21	
09383	135	16	1885 Sep 24	7:48:12	Partial	-0.5725	0.7867	332.0	186.7		5:02:12	10:34:12	6:14:51			9:21:33	
09427	135	17	1903 Oct 06	15:17:33	Partial	-0.5280	0.8654	337.5	193.7		12:28:48	18:06:18	13:40:42			16:54:24	
09469	135	18	1921 Oct 16	22:53:59	Partial	-0.4902	0.9317	342.1	199.1		20:02:56	1:45:02	21:14:26			0:33:32	
09511	135	19	1939 Oct 28	6:36:43	Partial	-0.4581	0.9877	346.1	203.4		3:43:40	9:29:46	4:55:01			8:18:25	
09552	135	20	1957 Nov 07	14:27:30	Total	-0.4332	1.0305	349.3	206.5	27.9	11:32:51	17:22:09	12:44:15	14:13:33	14:41:27	16:10:45	
09594	135	21	1975 Nov 18	22:24:12	Total	-0.4134	1.0642	352.1	209.0	40.2	19:28:09	1:20:15	20:39:42	22:04:06	22:44:18	0:08:42	
09635	135	22	1993 Nov 29	6:27:06	Total	-0.3994	1.0876	354.4	210.8	46.7	3:29:54	9:24:18	4:41:42	6:03:45	6:50:27	8:12:30	
09676	135	23	2011 Dec 10	14:32:56	Total	-0.3882	1.1061	356.4	212.2	51.1	11:34:44	17:31:08	12:46:50	14:07:23	14:58:29	16:19:02	
09717	135	24	2029 Dec 20	22:43:12	Total	-0.3811	1.1174	358.0	213.3	53.7	19:44:12	1:42:12	20:56:33	22:16:21	23:10:03	0:29:51	
09757	135	25	2048 Jan 01	6:53:55	Total	-0.3745	1.1280	359.4	214.3	55.9	3:54:13	9:53:37	5:06:46	6:25:58	7:21:52	8:41:04	
09798	135	26	2066 Jan 11	15:04:47	Total	-0.3687	1.1378	360.7	215.2	57.9	12:04:26	18:05:08	13:17:11	14:35:50	15:33:44	16:52:23	
09839	135	27	2084 Jan 22	23:13:00	Total	-0.3610	1.1513	362.0	216.3	60.5	20:12:00	2:14:00	21:24:51	22:42:45	23:43:15	1:01:09	
09881	135	28	2102 Feb 03	7:18:21	Total	-0.3514	1.1686	363.2	217.5	63.6	4:16:45	10:19:57	5:29:36	6:46:33	7:50:09	9:07:06	
09923	135	29	2120 Feb 14	15:17:20	Total	-0.3371	1.1950	364.6	219.1	67.9	12:15:02	18:19:38	13:27:47	14:43:23	15:51:17	17:06:53	
09966	135	30	2138 Feb 24	23:09:56	Total	-0.3178	1.2306	366.1	221.1	73.1	20:06:53	2:12:59	21:19:23	22:33:23	23:46:29	1:00:29	
10011	135	31	2156 Mar 07	6:54:14	Total	-0.2922	1.2782	367.7	223.5	79.0	3:50:23	9:58:05	5:02:29	6:14:44	7:33:44	8:45:59	
10054	135	32	2174 Mar 18	14:30:50	Total	-0.2605	1.3371	369.4	226.0	85.2	11:26:08	17:35:32	12:37:50	13:48:14	15:13:26	16:23:50	
10097	135	33	2192 Mar 28	21:56:24	Total	-0.2202	1.4120	371.1	228.8	91.6	18:50:51	1:01:57	20:02:00	21:10:36	22:42:12	23:50:48	
10140	135	34	2210 Apr 10	5:13:49	Total	-0.1736	1.4985	372.7	231.3	97.3	2:07:28	8:20:10	3:18:10	4:25:10	6:02:28	7:09:28	
10184	135	35	2228 Apr 20	12:20:32	Total	-0.1184	1.6007	374.0	233.6	102.1	9:13:32	15:27:32	10:23:44	11:29:29	13:11:35	14:17:20	
10229	135	36	2246 May 1	19:20:11	Total	-0.0575	1.7136	374.9	235.2	105.2	16:12:44	22:27:38	17:22:35	18:27:35	20:12:47	21:17:47	
10275	135	37	2264 May 12	2:08:52	Total	0.0121	1.7979	375.2	235.8	106.2	23:01:16	5:16:28	0:10:58	1:15:46	3:01:58	4:06:46	
10321	135	38	2282 May 23	8:52:42	Total	0.0856	1.6640	374.6	235.1	104.4	5:45:24	12:00:00	6:55:09	8:00:30	9:44:54	10:50:15	
10367	135	39	2300 Jun 03	15:28:06	Total	0.1655	1.5183	373.1	232.8	99.0	12:21:33	18:34:39	13:31:42	14:38:36	16:17:36	17:24:30	
10413	135	40	2318 Jun 14	22:00:42	Total	0.2477	1.3681	370.4	228.8	88.9	18:55:30	1:05:54	20:06:18	21:16:15	22:45:09	23:55:06	
10459	135	41	2336 Jun 25	4:27:14	Total	0.3347	1.2090	366.4	222.5	71.0	1:24:02	7:30:26	2:35:59	3:51:44	5:02:44	6:18:29	
10505	135	42	2354 Jul 06	10:53:56	Total	0.4214	1.0501	361.2	214.0	36.7	7:53:20	13:54:32	9:06:56	10:35:35	11:12:17	12:40:56	
10551	135	43	2372 Jul 16	17:18:29	Partial	0.5095	0.8887	354.5	202.8		14:21:14	20:15:44	15:37:05			18:59:53	
10595	135	44	2390 Jul 27	23:44:46	Partial	0.5961	0.7298	346.7	188.9		20:51:25	2:38:07	22:10:19			1:19:13	
10640	135	45	2408 Aug 07	6:12:58	Partial	0.6809	0.5740	337.6	171.8		3:24:10	9:01:46	4:47:04			7:38:52	
10684	135	46	2426 Aug 18	12:46:04	Partial	0.7614	0.4258	327.5	151.4		10:02:19	15:29:49	11:30:22			14:01:46	
10728	135	47	2444 Aug 28	19:24:50	Partial	0.8375	0.2857	316.7	126.5		16:46:29	22:03:11	18:21:35			20:28:05	
10771	135	48	2462 Sep 09	2:10:01	Partial	0.9084	0.1551	305.3	94.9		23:37:22	4:42:40	1:22:34			2:57:28	
10813	135	49	2480 Sep 19	9:03:33	Partial	0.9726	0.0366	293.8	46.8		6:36:39	11:30:27	8:40:09			9:26:57	
10854	135	50	2498 Sep 30	16:05:36	Penumbral	1.0300	-0.0694	282.4			13:44:24	18:26:48					
10895	135	51	2516 Oct 11	23:17:01	Penumbral	1.0802	-0.1624	271.5			21:01:16	1:32:46					
10935	135	52	2534 Oct 23	6:38:03	Penumbral	1.1230	-0.2416	261.5			4:27:18	8:48:48					
10977	135	53	2552 Nov 02	14:09:22	Penumbral	1.1581	-0.3067	252.5			12:03:07	16:15:37					
11019	135	54	2570 Nov 13	21:50:12	Penumbral	1.1859	-0.3581	245.0			19:47:42	23:52:42					
11059	135	55	2588 Nov 24	5:39:09	Penumbral	1.2078	-0.3986	238.6			3:39:51	7:38:27					
11099	135	56	2606 Dec 06	13:36:27	Penumbral	1.2234	-0.4274	233.7			11:39:36	15:33:18					
11139	135	57	2624 Dec 16	21:40:25	Penumbral	1.2345	-0.4476	230.0			19:45:25	23:35:25					
11180	135	58	2642 Dec 28	5:49:29	Penumbral	1.2419	-0.4605	227.2			3:55:53	7:43:05					
11221	135	59	2661 Jan 07	14:01:35	Penumbral	1.2474	-0.4697	224.8			12:09:11	15:53:59					
11264	135	60	2679 Jan 18	22:16:02	Penumbral	1.2515	-0.4762	222.7			20:24:41	0:07:23					
11306	135	61	2697 Jan 29	6:31:11	Penumbral	1.2559	-0.4828	220.4			4:40:59	8:21:23					
11349	135	62	2715 Feb 10	14:44:02	Penumbral	1.2626	-0.4931	217.3			12:55:23	16:32:41					
11391	135	63	2733 Feb 20	22:54:49	Penumbral	1.2716	-0.5075	213.3			21:08:10	0:41:28					
11434	135	64	2751 Mar 04	7:00:48	Penumbral	1.2850	-0.5295	207.8			5:16:54	8:44:42					
11478	135	65	2769 Mar 14	15:02:24	Penumbral	1.3025	-0.5591	200.7			13:22:03	16:42:45					
11522	135	66	2787 Mar 25	22:56:42	Penumbral	1.3267	-0.6005	191.0			21:21:12	0:32:12					
11568	135	67	2805 Apr 05	6:45:50	Penumbral	1.3557	-0.6507	178.8			5:16:26	8:15:14					
11615	135	68	2823 Apr 16	14:27:27	Penumbral	1.3911	-0.7127	162.8			13:06:03	15:48:51					
11662	135	69	2841 Apr 26	22:02:28	Penumbral	1.4326	-0.7856	141.9			20:51:31	23:13:25					
11708	135	70	2859 May 8	5:30:26	Penumbral	1.4800	-0.8695	113.1			4:33:53	6:26:59					
11754	135	71	2877 May 18	12:53:08	Penumbral	1.5321	-0.9623	68.2			12:19:02	13:27:14					

== See also ==
- List of lunar eclipses
  - List of Saros series for lunar eclipses
