= Solar Saros 142 =

Solar saros series

Historic saros cycle animation

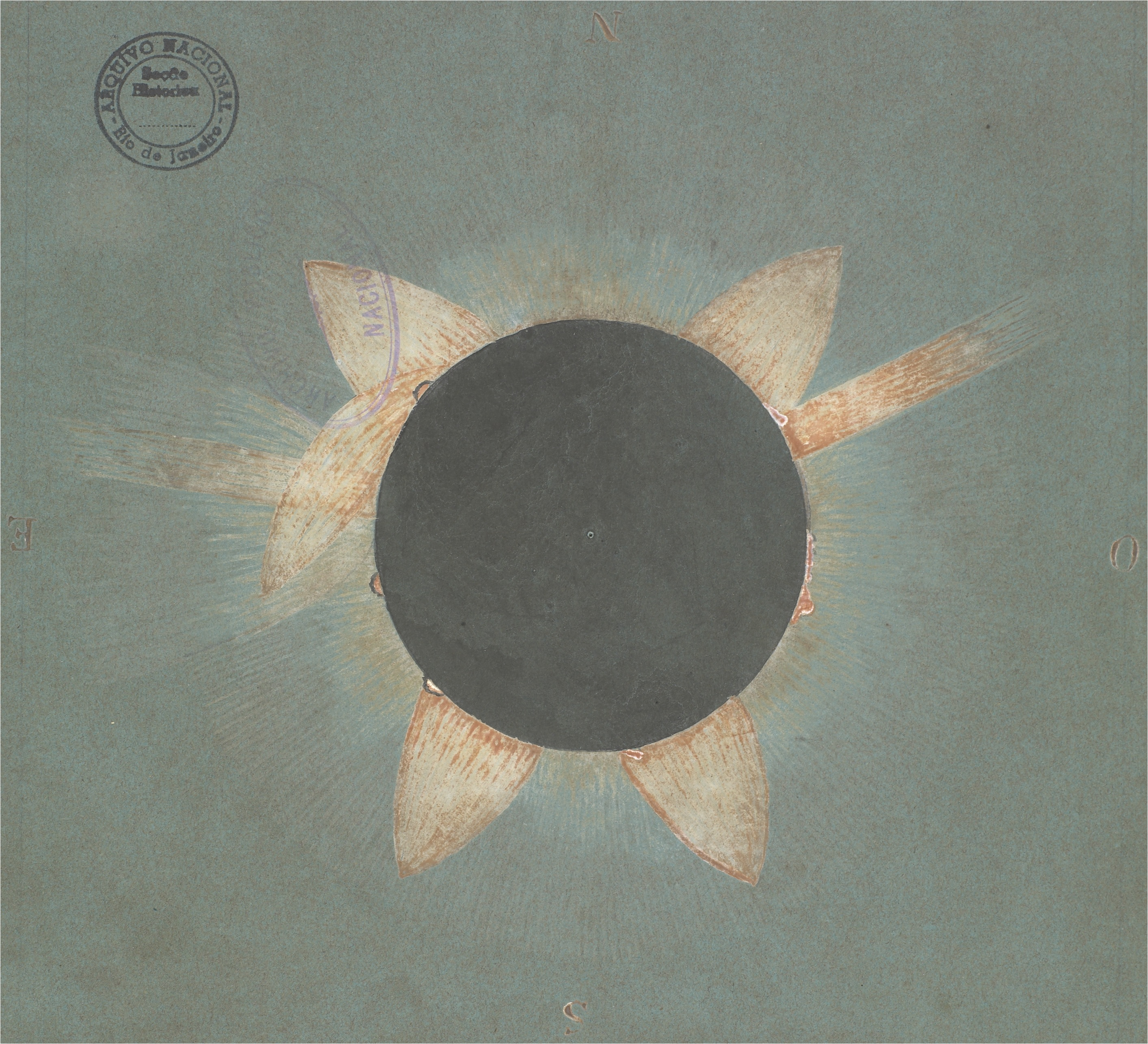
September 7, 1858 Series member 14

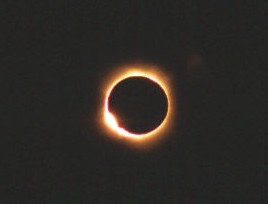
December 4, 2002 Totality from Australia Series member 22

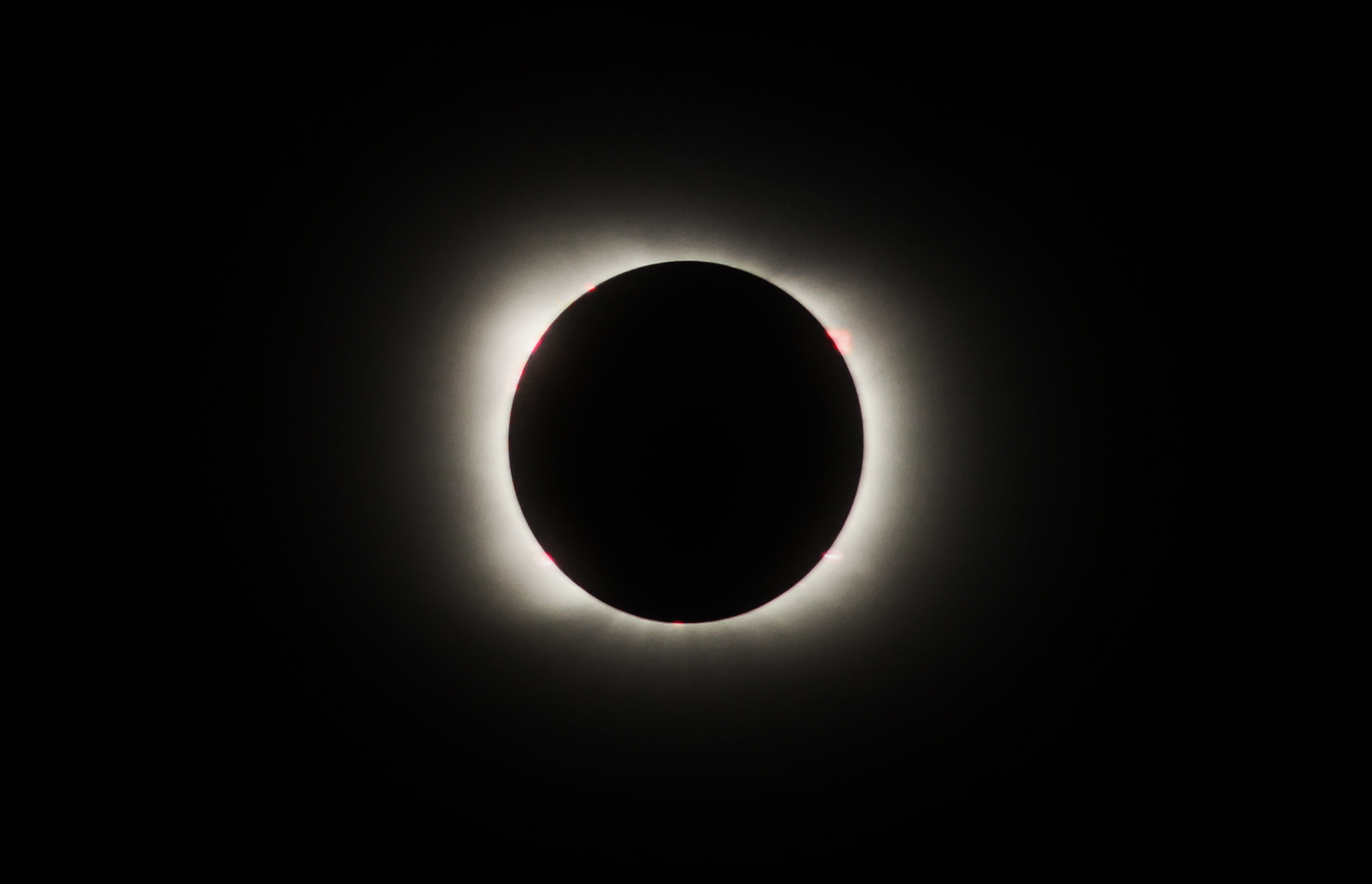
December 14, 2020 Totality from Gorbea, Chile Series member 23

Saros cycle series 142 for solar eclipses occurs at the Moon's descending node, repeating every 18 years, 11 days, containing 72 eclipses, 44 of which are umbral, of which all but one are total. The first eclipse in the series was on 17 April 1624 and the final eclipse will be on 5 June 2904.

The longest totality will be 6 minutes 34 seconds on 28 May, 2291. The series is currently producing short total eclipses. The most recent eclipse was a total eclipse on 2020 December 14 and the next will be a total eclipse on 2038 December 25/26.

This solar saros is linked to Lunar Saros 135.

== Umbral eclipses ==
Umbral eclipses (annular, total and hybrid) can be further classified as either: 1) Central (two limits), 2) Central (one limit) or 3) Non-Central (one limit). The statistical distribution of these classes in Saros series 142 appears in the following table.

| Classification | Number | Percent |
|---|---|---|
| All Umbral eclipses | 44 | 100.00% |
| Central (two limits) | 43 | 97.73% |
| Central (one limit) | 1 | 2.27% |
| Non-central (one limit) | 0 | 0.00% |

== All eclipses ==
| Saros | Member | Date | Time (Greatest) UTC | Type | Location Lat, Long | Gamma | Mag. | Width (km) | Duration (min:sec) | Ref |
|---|---|---|---|---|---|---|---|---|---|---|
| 142 | 1 | April 17, 1624 | 17:16:18 | Partial | 71.2S 23.1W | -1.5208 | 0.0582 | | | |
| 142 | 2 | April 29, 1642 | 0:29:43 | Partial | 70.6S 144.7W | -1.4585 | 0.166 | | | |
| 142 | 3 | May 9, 1660 | 7:36:45 | Partial | 69.7S 95.9E | -1.3897 | 0.2868 | | | |
| 142 | 4 | May 20, 1678 | 14:40:42 | Partial | 68.8S 22.1W | -1.3172 | 0.4158 | | | |
| 142 | 5 | May 30, 1696 | 21:41:23 | Partial | 67.8S 138.7W | -1.2406 | 0.5534 | | | |
| 142 | 6 | June 12, 1714 | 4:40:01 | Partial | 66.8S 105.8E | -1.161 | 0.6976 | | | |
| 142 | 7 | June 22, 1732 | 11:38:48 | Partial | 65.8S 9.3W | -1.08 | 0.8457 | | | |
| 142 | 8 | July 3, 1750 | 18:38:52 | Partial | 64.8S 124.3W | -0.9985 | 0.9956 | | | |
| 142 | 9 | July 14, 1768 | 1:40:57 | Hybrid | 43S 137.4E | -0.9176 | 1.0055 | 48 | 0m 29s | |
| 142 | 10 | July 25, 1786 | 8:46:33 | Total | 34.6S 30.8E | -0.8384 | 1.0106 | 66 | 0m 59s | |
| 142 | 11 | August 5, 1804 | 15:57:13 | Total | 29.3S 77.1W | -0.7622 | 1.0144 | 75 | 1m 20s | |
| 142 | 12 | August 16, 1822 | 23:14:34 | Total | 26.1S 173.5E | -0.6904 | 1.0173 | 80 | 1m 35s | |
| 142 | 13 | August 27, 1840 | 6:37:32 | Total | 24.3S 62.9E | -0.6223 | 1.0195 | 83 | 1m 45s | |
| 142 | 14 | September 7, 1858 | 14:09:29 | Total | 23.9S 49.8W | -0.5609 | 1.021 | 85 | 1m 50s | |
| 142 | 15 | September 17, 1876 | 21:49:15 | Total | 24.6S 164.5W | -0.5054 | 1.022 | 86 | 1m 53s | |
| 142 | 16 | September 29, 1894 | 5:39:02 | Total | 26.1S 78.5E | -0.4573 | 1.0226 | 85 | 1m 55s | |
| 142 | 17 | October 10, 1912 | 13:36:14 | Total | 28.1S 40.1W | -0.4149 | 1.0229 | 85 | 1m 55s | |
| 142 | 18 | October 21, 1930 | 21:43:53 | Total | 30.5S 161.1W | -0.3804 | 1.023 | 84 | 1m 55s | |
| 142 | 19 | November 1, 1948 | 5:59:18 | Total | 33.1S 76.2E | -0.3517 | 1.0231 | 84 | 1m 56s | |
| 142 | 20 | November 12, 1966 | 14:23:28 | Total | 35.6S 48.2W | -0.33 | 1.0234 | 84 | 1m 57s | |
| 142 | 21 | November 22, 1984 | 22:54:17 | Total | 37.8S 173.6W | -0.3132 | 1.0237 | 85 | 2m 0s | |
| 142 | 22 | December 4, 2002 | 7:32:16 | Total | 39.5S 59.6E | -0.302 | 1.0244 | 87 | 2m 4s | |
| 142 | 23 | December 14, 2020 | 16:14:39 | Total | 40.3S 67.9W | -0.2939 | 1.0254 | 90 | 2m 10s | |
| 142 | 24 | December 26, 2038 | 1:00:10 | Total | 40.3S 164E | -0.2881 | 1.0268 | 95 | 2m 18s | |
| 142 | 25 | January 5, 2057 | 9:47:52 | Total | 39.2S 35.2E | -0.2837 | 1.0287 | 102 | 2m 29s | |
| 142 | 26 | January 16, 2075 | 18:36:04 | Total | 37.2S 94.1W | -0.2799 | 1.0311 | 110 | 2m 42s | |
| 142 | 27 | January 27, 2093 | 3:22:16 | Total | 34.1S 136.4E | -0.2737 | 1.034 | 119 | 2m 58s | |
| 142 | 28 | February 8, 2111 | 12:05:33 | Total | 30.2S 6.8E | -0.265 | 1.0374 | 130 | 3m 17s | |
| 142 | 29 | February 18, 2129 | 20:44:37 | Total | 25.6S 122.5W | -0.2526 | 1.0411 | 142 | 3m 38s | |
| 142 | 30 | March 2, 2147 | 5:18:54 | Total | 20.5S 108.8E | -0.236 | 1.0452 | 155 | 4m 2s | |
| 142 | 31 | March 12, 2165 | 13:45:50 | Total | 14.9S 18.8W | -0.213 | 1.0495 | 168 | 4m 27s | |
| 142 | 32 | March 23, 2183 | 22:06:49 | Total | 8.9S 145.2W | -0.1848 | 1.054 | 181 | 4m 54s | |
| 142 | 33 | April 4, 2201 | 6:19:57 | Total | 2.7S 90.2E | -0.1495 | 1.0584 | 194 | 5m 20s | |
| 142 | 34 | April 15, 2219 | 14:26:33 | Total | 3.7N 32.8W | -0.1086 | 1.0628 | 207 | 5m 45s | |
| 142 | 35 | April 25, 2237 | 22:25:04 | Total | 10.1N 153.7W | -0.0606 | 1.0668 | 219 | 6m 5s | |
| 142 | 36 | May 7, 2255 | 6:18:06 | Total | 16.4N 87.2E | -0.0076 | 1.0706 | 230 | 6m 22s | |
| 142 | 37 | May 17, 2273 | 14:04:31 | Total | 22.5N 29.7W | 0.0515 | 1.0738 | 240 | 6m 31s | |
| 142 | 38 | May 28, 2291 | 21:45:28 | Total | 28.3N 144.5W | 0.1153 | 1.0764 | 249 | 6m 34s | |
| 142 | 39 | June 9, 2309 | 5:21:55 | Total | 33.6N 102.7E | 0.1833 | 1.0783 | 257 | 6m 30s | |
| 142 | 40 | June 20, 2327 | 12:55:01 | Total | 38.3N 8.3W | 0.2542 | 1.0795 | 265 | 6m 21s | |
| 142 | 41 | June 30, 2345 | 20:26:17 | Total | 42.1N 117.7W | 0.3267 | 1.0797 | 272 | 6m 7s | |
| 142 | 42 | July 12, 2363 | 3:55:03 | Total | 45N 134.5E | 0.4012 | 1.0792 | 279 | 5m 51s | |
| 142 | 43 | July 22, 2381 | 11:25:02 | Total | 46.9N 26.9E | 0.4748 | 1.0777 | 285 | 5m 33s | |
| 142 | 44 | August 2, 2399 | 18:55:14 | Total | 48N 80.4W | 0.5482 | 1.0754 | 291 | 5m 14s | |
| 142 | 45 | August 13, 2417 | 2:28:06 | Total | 48.3N 171.4E | 0.6189 | 1.0723 | 297 | 4m 55s | |
| 142 | 46 | August 24, 2435 | 10:03:12 | Total | 48.2N 62.2E | 0.6875 | 1.0684 | 304 | 4m 35s | |
| 142 | 47 | September 3, 2453 | 17:43:48 | Total | 48N 49.1W | 0.7513 | 1.0638 | 312 | 4m 15s | |
| 142 | 48 | September 15, 2471 | 1:29:11 | Total | 48N 162.2W | 0.8109 | 1.0585 | 323 | 3m 54s | |
| 142 | 49 | September 25, 2489 | 9:20:22 | Total | 48.6N 82.9E | 0.8654 | 1.0527 | 341 | 3m 32s | |
| 142 | 50 | October 7, 2507 | 17:18:18 | Total | 50N 34W | 0.9141 | 1.0464 | 374 | 3m 7s | |
| 142 | 51 | October 18, 2525 | 1:23:55 | Total | 52.7N 152.5W | 0.9558 | 1.0396 | 450 | 2m 39s | |
| 142 | 52 | October 29, 2543 | 9:36:30 | Total (Note: No northern limit) | 58.7N 91.9E | 0.9919 | 1.0316 | - | 2m 2s | |
| 142 | 53 | November 8, 2561 | 17:55:40 | Partial | 62.5N 31.3W | 1.0221 | 0.966 | | | |
| 142 | 54 | November 20, 2579 | 2:21:42 | Partial | 63.3N 166.5W | 1.0466 | 0.9182 | | | |
| 142 | 55 | November 30, 2597 | 10:54:08 | Partial | 64.1N 56.4E | 1.0654 | 0.8814 | | | |
| 142 | 56 | December 12, 2615 | 19:30:54 | Partial | 65.1N 82.1W | 1.0802 | 0.8524 | | | |
| 142 | 57 | December 23, 2633 | 4:12:15 | Partial | 66.1N 137.9E | 1.0909 | 0.8313 | | | |
| 142 | 58 | January 3, 2652 | 12:55:42 | Partial | 67.2N 3.1W | 1.0995 | 0.8144 | | | |
| 142 | 59 | January 13, 2670 | 21:41:08 | Partial | 68.3N 145.2W | 1.1061 | 0.8013 | | | |
| 142 | 60 | January 25, 2688 | 6:24:18 | Partial | 69.3N 72.8E | 1.1141 | 0.786 | | | |
| 142 | 61 | February 5, 2706 | 15:07:13 | Partial | 70.3N 69.9W | 1.1218 | 0.7713 | | | |
| 142 | 62 | February 16, 2724 | 23:45:25 | Partial | 71.1N 148E | 1.1327 | 0.7511 | | | |
| 142 | 63 | February 27, 2742 | 8:19:28 | Partial | 71.7N 6.3E | 1.1468 | 0.725 | | | |
| 142 | 64 | March 9, 2760 | 16:45:54 | Partial | 72.1N 133.9W | 1.1667 | 0.6887 | | | |
| 142 | 65 | March 21, 2778 | 1:06:37 | Partial | 72.3N 87E | 1.1908 | 0.6446 | | | |
| 142 | 66 | March 31, 2796 | 9:18:22 | Partial | 72.1N 49.7W | 1.2216 | 0.5883 | | | |
| 142 | 67 | April 11, 2814 | 17:21:36 | Partial | 71.7N 176E | 1.2589 | 0.5204 | | | |
| 142 | 68 | April 22, 2832 | 1:15:31 | Partial | 71.1N 44.5E | 1.3031 | 0.4397 | | | |
| 142 | 69 | May 3, 2850 | 9:01:02 | Partial | 70.3N 84.3W | 1.3537 | 0.3475 | | | |
| 142 | 70 | May 13, 2868 | 16:37:07 | Partial | 69.4N 149.9E | 1.4111 | 0.243 | | | |
| 142 | 71 | May 25, 2886 | 0:04:54 | Partial | 68.5N 26.8E | 1.4742 | 0.1283 | | | |
| 142 | 72 | June 5, 2904 | 7:24:50 | Partial | 67.5N 93.8W | 1.5428 | 0.004 | | | |
