= January 1972 lunar eclipse =

Total lunar eclipse January 30, 1972

- Total eclipse
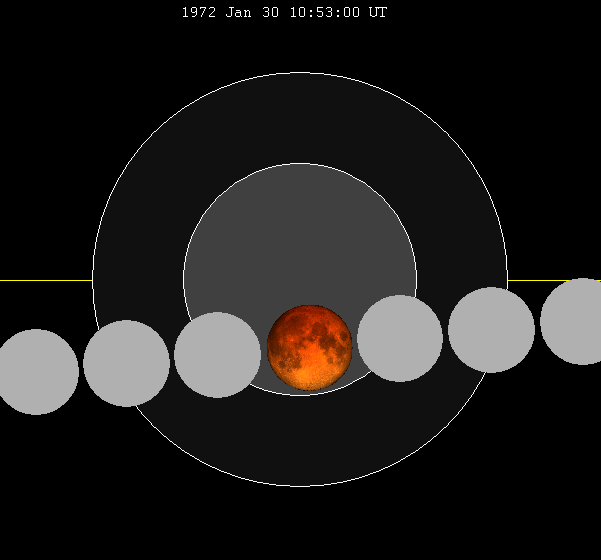
- The Moon's hourly motion shown right to left
- Date: January 30, 1972
- Gamma: −0.4273
- Magnitude: 1.0497
- Saros cycle: 133 (24 of 71)
- Totality: 34 minutes, 48 seconds
- Partiality: 203 minutes, 23 seconds
- Penumbral: 340 minutes, 19 seconds
Contacts (UTC)
- P1: 8:03:16
- U1: 9:11:39
- U2: 10:35:57
- Greatest: 10:53:23
- U3: 11:10:45
- U4: 12:35:03
- P4: 13:43:35

A total lunar eclipse occurred at the Moon’s descending node of orbit on Sunday, January 30, 1972, with an umbral magnitude of 1.0497. A lunar eclipse occurs when the Moon moves into the Earth's shadow, causing the Moon to be darkened. A total lunar eclipse occurs when the Moon's near side entirely passes into the Earth's umbral shadow. Unlike a solar eclipse, which can only be viewed from a relatively small area of the world, a lunar eclipse may be viewed from anywhere on the night side of Earth. A total lunar eclipse can last up to nearly two hours, while a total solar eclipse lasts only a few minutes at any given place, because the Moon's shadow is smaller. Occurring about 6.6 days before apogee (on February 6, 1972, at 0:45 UTC), the Moon's apparent diameter was smaller.

== Visibility ==
The eclipse was completely visible over northeast Asia, western and central North America, and the central Pacific Ocean, seen rising over much of Asia and Australia and setting over eastern North America and South America.

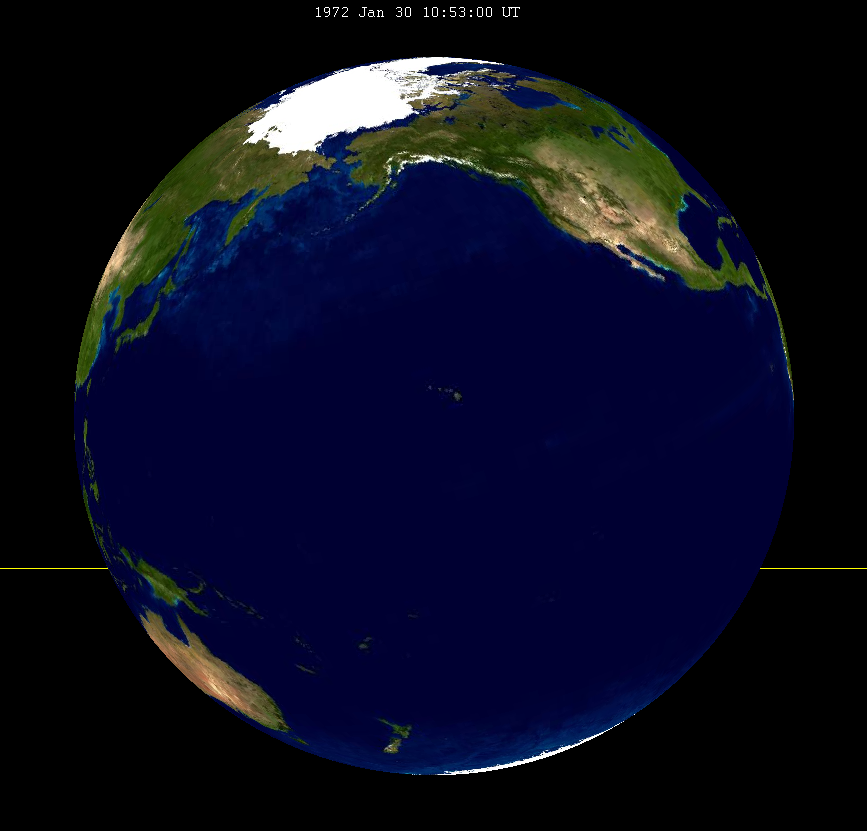
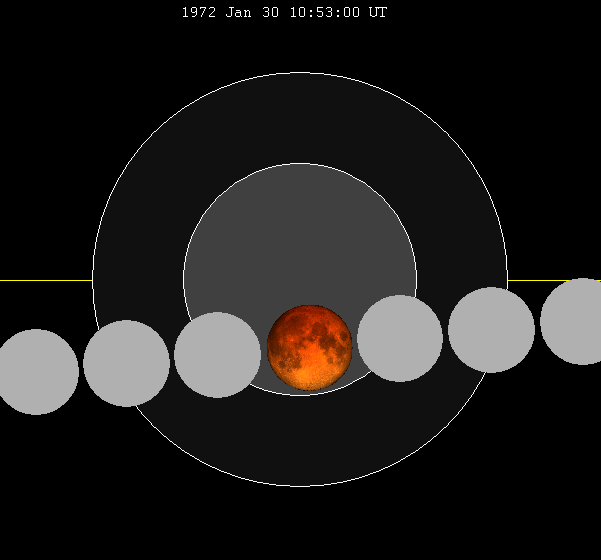

== Eclipse details ==
Shown below is a table displaying details about this particular solar eclipse. It describes various parameters pertaining to this eclipse.

January 30, 1972 Lunar Eclipse Parameters
Parameter	Value
Penumbral Magnitude	2.09866
Umbral Magnitude	1.04971
Gamma	−0.42729
Sun Right Ascension	20h48m23.2s
Sun Declination	-17°50'13.7"
Sun Semi-Diameter	16'14.2"
Sun Equatorial Horizontal Parallax	08.9"
Moon Right Ascension	08h47m46.4s
Moon Declination	+17°27'35.5"
Moon Semi-Diameter	15'28.8"
Moon Equatorial Horizontal Parallax	0°56'48.6"
ΔT	42.3 s

== Eclipse season ==
This eclipse is part of an eclipse season, a period, roughly every six months, when eclipses occur. Only two (or occasionally three) eclipse seasons occur each year, and each season lasts about 35 days and repeats just short of six months (173 days) later; thus two full eclipse seasons always occur each year. Either two or three eclipses happen each eclipse season. In the sequence below, each eclipse is separated by a fortnight.

Eclipse season of January 1972
January 16 Ascending node (new moon)	January 30 Descending node (full moon)
Annular solar eclipse Solar Saros 121	Total lunar eclipse Lunar Saros 133

== Related eclipses ==
=== Eclipses in 1972 ===
- An annular solar eclipse on January 16.
- A total lunar eclipse on January 30.
- A total solar eclipse on July 10.
- A partial lunar eclipse on July 26.

=== Metonic ===
- Preceded by: Lunar eclipse of April 13, 1968
- Followed by: Lunar eclipse of November 18, 1975

=== Tzolkinex ===
- Preceded by: Lunar eclipse of December 19, 1964
- Followed by: Lunar eclipse of March 13, 1979

=== Half-Saros ===
- Preceded by: Solar eclipse of January 25, 1963
- Followed by: Solar eclipse of February 4, 1981

=== Tritos ===
- Preceded by: Lunar eclipse of March 2, 1961
- Followed by: Lunar eclipse of December 30, 1982

=== Lunar Saros 133 ===
- Preceded by: Lunar eclipse of January 19, 1954
- Followed by: Lunar eclipse of February 9, 1990

=== Inex ===
- Preceded by: Lunar eclipse of February 20, 1943
- Followed by: Lunar eclipse of January 9, 2001

=== Triad ===
- Preceded by: Lunar eclipse of March 30, 1885
- Followed by: Lunar eclipse of November 30, 2058

=== Lunar eclipses of 1969–1973 ===
This eclipse is a member of a semester series. An eclipse in a semester series of lunar eclipses repeats approximately every 177 days and 4 hours (a semester) at alternating nodes of the Moon's orbit.

The penumbral lunar eclipses on April 2, 1969 and September 25, 1969 occur in the previous lunar year eclipse set, and the lunar eclipses on June 15, 1973 (penumbral) and December 10, 1973 (partial) occur in the next lunar year eclipse set.

Lunar eclipse series sets from 1969 to 1973
Ascending node				Descending node			
Saros	Date Viewing	Type Chart	Gamma	Saros	Date Viewing	Type Chart	Gamma
108	1969 Aug 27	Penumbral	−1.5407	113	1970 Feb 21	Partial	0.9620
118	1970 Aug 17	Partial	−0.8053	123	1971 Feb 10	Total	0.2741
128	1971 Aug 06	Total	−0.0794	133	1972 Jan 30	Total	−0.4273
138	1972 Jul 26	Partial	0.7117	143	1973 Jan 18	Penumbral	−1.0845
148	1973 Jul 15	Penumbral	1.5178				

=== Saros 133 ===
This eclipse is a part of Saros series 133, repeating every 18 years, 11 days, and containing 71 events. The series started with a penumbral lunar eclipse on May 13, 1557. It contains partial eclipses from August 7, 1683 through December 17, 1899; total eclipses from December 28, 1917 through August 3, 2278; and a second set of partial eclipses from August 14, 2296 through March 11, 2639. The series ends at member 71 as a penumbral eclipse on June 29, 2819.

The longest duration of totality will be produced by member 35 at 101 minutes, 41 seconds on May 30, 2170. All eclipses in this series occur at the Moon’s descending node of orbit.

Greatest	First			
The greatest eclipse of the series will occur on 2170 May 30, lasting 101 minutes, 41 seconds.	Penumbral	Partial	Total	Central
The greatest eclipse of the series will occur on 2170 May 30, lasting 101 minutes, 41 seconds.	1557 May 13	1683 Aug 07	1917 Dec 28	2098 Apr 15
The greatest eclipse of the series will occur on 2170 May 30, lasting 101 minutes, 41 seconds.	Last			
The greatest eclipse of the series will occur on 2170 May 30, lasting 101 minutes, 41 seconds.	Central	Total	Partial	Penumbral
The greatest eclipse of the series will occur on 2170 May 30, lasting 101 minutes, 41 seconds.	2224 Jul 01	2278 Aug 03	2639 Mar 11	2819 Jun 29

Eclipses are tabulated in three columns; every third eclipse in the same column is one exeligmos apart, so they all cast shadows over approximately the same parts of the Earth.

Series members 15–36 occur between 1801 and 2200:
15	16	17
1809 Oct 23	1827 Nov 03	1845 Nov 14
18	19	20
1863 Nov 25	1881 Dec 05	1899 Dec 17
21	22	23
1917 Dec 28	1936 Jan 08	1954 Jan 19
24	25	26
1972 Jan 30	1990 Feb 09	2008 Feb 21
27	28	29
2026 Mar 03	2044 Mar 13	2062 Mar 25
30	31	32
2080 Apr 04	2098 Apr 15	2116 Apr 27
33	34	35
2134 May 08	2152 May 18	2170 May 30
36
2188 Jun 09

=== Tritos series ===
This eclipse is a part of a tritos cycle, repeating at alternating nodes every 135 synodic months (≈ 3986.63 days, or 11 years minus 1 month). Their appearance and longitude are irregular due to a lack of synchronization with the anomalistic month (period of perigee), but groupings of 3 tritos cycles (≈ 33 years minus 3 months) come close (≈ 434.044 anomalistic months), so eclipses are similar in these groupings.

Series members between 1801 and 2200
1808 May 10 (Saros 118)	1819 Apr 10 (Saros 119)	1830 Mar 09 (Saros 120)	1841 Feb 06 (Saros 121)	1852 Jan 07 (Saros 122)
1862 Dec 06 (Saros 123)	1873 Nov 04 (Saros 124)	1884 Oct 04 (Saros 125)	1895 Sep 04 (Saros 126)	1906 Aug 04 (Saros 127)
1917 Jul 04 (Saros 128)	1928 Jun 03 (Saros 129)	1939 May 03 (Saros 130)	1950 Apr 02 (Saros 131)	1961 Mar 02 (Saros 132)
1972 Jan 30 (Saros 133)	1982 Dec 30 (Saros 134)	1993 Nov 29 (Saros 135)	2004 Oct 28 (Saros 136)	2015 Sep 28 (Saros 137)
2026 Aug 28 (Saros 138)	2037 Jul 27 (Saros 139)	2048 Jun 26 (Saros 140)	2059 May 27 (Saros 141)	2070 Apr 25 (Saros 142)
2081 Mar 25 (Saros 143)	2092 Feb 23 (Saros 144)	2103 Jan 23 (Saros 145)	2113 Dec 22 (Saros 146)	2124 Nov 21 (Saros 147)
2135 Oct 22 (Saros 148)	2146 Sep 20 (Saros 149)	2157 Aug 20 (Saros 150)	2168 Jul 20 (Saros 151)	2179 Jun 19 (Saros 152)
2190 May 19 (Saros 153)

=== Inex series ===
This eclipse is a part of the long period inex cycle, repeating at alternating nodes, every 358 synodic months (≈ 10,571.95 days, or 29 years minus 20 days). Their appearance and longitude are irregular due to a lack of synchronization with the anomalistic month (period of perigee). However, groupings of 3 inex cycles (≈ 87 years minus 2 months) comes close (≈ 1,151.02 anomalistic months), so eclipses are similar in these groupings.

Series members between 1801 and 2200
1827 May 11 (Saros 128)	1856 Apr 20 (Saros 129)	1885 Mar 30 (Saros 130)
1914 Mar 12 (Saros 131)	1943 Feb 20 (Saros 132)	1972 Jan 30 (Saros 133)
2001 Jan 09 (Saros 134)	2029 Dec 20 (Saros 135)	2058 Nov 30 (Saros 136)
2087 Nov 10 (Saros 137)	2116 Oct 21 (Saros 138)	2145 Sep 30 (Saros 139)
2174 Sep 11 (Saros 140)

=== Half-Saros cycle ===
A lunar eclipse will be preceded and followed by solar eclipses by 9 years and 5.5 days (a half saros). This lunar eclipse is related to two annular solar eclipses of Solar Saros 140.

January 25, 1963	February 4, 1981

== See also ==
- List of lunar eclipses
- List of 20th-century lunar eclipses
