= January 1936 lunar eclipse =

Total lunar eclipse January 8, 1936

- Total eclipse
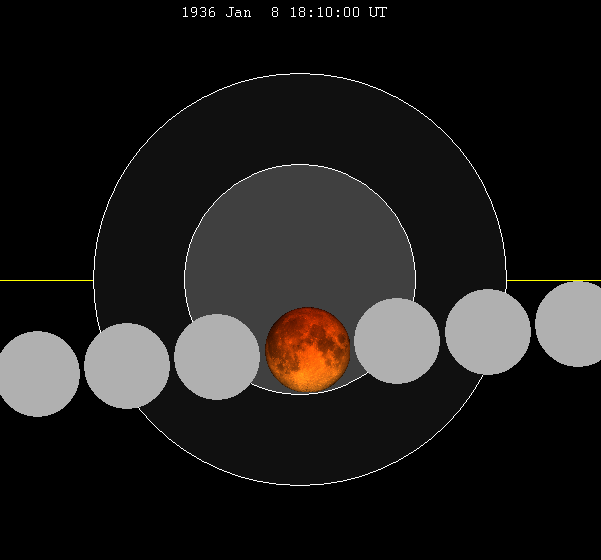
- The Moon's hourly motion shown right to left
- Date: January 8, 1936
- Gamma: −0.4429
- Magnitude: 1.0173
- Saros cycle: 133 (22 of 71)
- Totality: 20 minutes, 48 seconds
- Partiality: 202 minutes, 31 seconds
- Penumbral: 342 minutes, 5 seconds
Contacts (UTC)
- P1: 15:18:34
- U1: 16:28:17
- U2: 17:59:09
- Greatest: 18:09:34
- U3: 18:19:56
- U4: 19:50:48
- P4: 21:00:40

A total lunar eclipse occurred at the Moon’s descending node of orbit on Wednesday, January 8, 1936, with an umbral magnitude of 1.0173. A lunar eclipse occurs when the Moon moves into the Earth's shadow, causing the Moon to be darkened. A total lunar eclipse occurs when the Moon's near side entirely passes into the Earth's umbral shadow. Unlike a solar eclipse, which can only be viewed from a relatively small area of the world, a lunar eclipse may be viewed from anywhere on the night side of Earth. A total lunar eclipse can last up to nearly two hours, while a total solar eclipse lasts only a few minutes at any given place, because the Moon's shadow is smaller. Occurring about 6.2 days before apogee (on January 14, 1936, at 23:50 UTC), the Moon's apparent diameter was smaller.

== Visibility ==
The eclipse was completely visible over eastern Europe, Asia, and western Australia, seen rising over Africa and western Europe and setting over eastern Australia, northwestern North America, and the central Pacific Ocean.

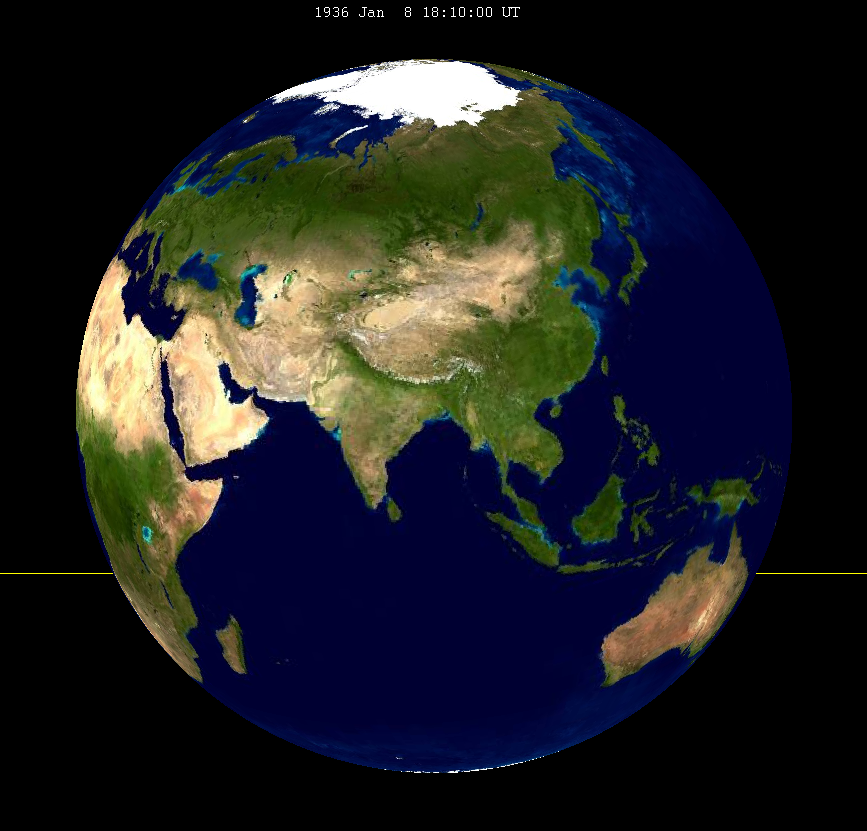
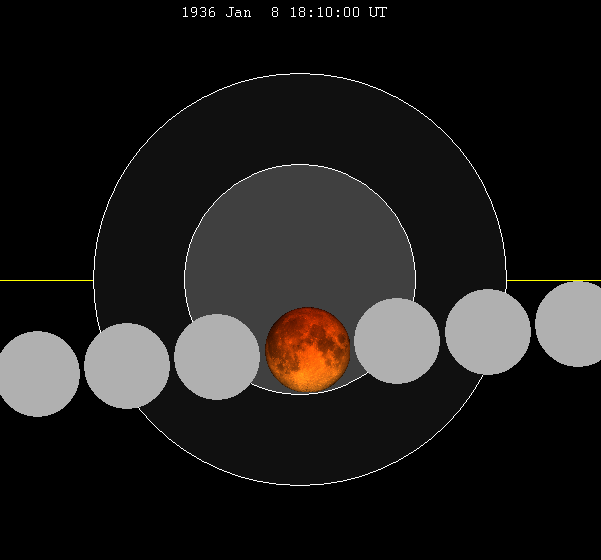

== Eclipse details ==
Shown below is a table displaying details about this particular solar eclipse. It describes various parameters pertaining to this eclipse.

January 8, 1936 Lunar Eclipse Parameters
Parameter	Value
Penumbral Magnitude	2.07396
Umbral Magnitude	1.01725
Gamma	−0.44288
Sun Right Ascension	19h15m02.9s
Sun Declination	-22°19'38.2"
Sun Semi-Diameter	16'15.9"
Sun Equatorial Horizontal Parallax	08.9"
Moon Right Ascension	07h14m38.5s
Moon Declination	+21°55'15.9"
Moon Semi-Diameter	15'23.6"
Moon Equatorial Horizontal Parallax	0°56'29.6"
ΔT	23.8 s

== Eclipse season ==
This eclipse is part of an eclipse season, a period, roughly every six months, when eclipses occur. Only two (or occasionally three) eclipse seasons occur each year, and each season lasts about 35 days and repeats just short of six months (173 days) later; thus two full eclipse seasons always occur each year. Either two or three eclipses happen each eclipse season. In the sequence below, each eclipse is separated by a fortnight.

Eclipse season of December 1935–January 1936
December 25 Ascending node (new moon)	January 8 Descending node (full moon)
Annular solar eclipse Solar Saros 121	Total lunar eclipse Lunar Saros 133

== Related eclipses ==
=== Eclipses in 1936 ===
- A total lunar eclipse on January 8.
- A total solar eclipse on June 19.
- A partial lunar eclipse on July 4.
- An annular solar eclipse on December 13.
- A penumbral lunar eclipse on December 28.

=== Metonic ===
- Preceded by: Lunar eclipse of March 22, 1932
- Followed by: Lunar eclipse of October 28, 1939

=== Tzolkinex ===
- Preceded by: Lunar eclipse of November 27, 1928
- Followed by: Lunar eclipse of February 20, 1943

=== Half-Saros ===
- Preceded by: Solar eclipse of January 3, 1927
- Followed by: Solar eclipse of January 14, 1945

=== Tritos ===
- Preceded by: Lunar eclipse of February 8, 1925
- Followed by: Lunar eclipse of December 8, 1946

=== Lunar Saros 133 ===
- Preceded by: Lunar eclipse of December 28, 1917
- Followed by: Lunar eclipse of January 19, 1954

=== Inex ===
- Preceded by: Lunar eclipse of January 29, 1907
- Followed by: Lunar eclipse of December 19, 1964

=== Triad ===
- Preceded by: Lunar eclipse of March 9, 1849
- Followed by: Lunar eclipse of November 8, 2022

=== Lunar eclipses of 1933–1936 ===
This eclipse is a member of a semester series. An eclipse in a semester series of lunar eclipses repeats approximately every 177 days and 4 hours (a semester) at alternating nodes of the Moon's orbit.

The penumbral lunar eclipses on March 12, 1933 and September 4, 1933 occur in the previous lunar year eclipse set.

Lunar eclipse series sets from 1933 to 1936
Descending node				Ascending node			
Saros	Date Viewing	Type Chart	Gamma	Saros	Date Viewing	Type Chart	Gamma
103	1933 Feb 10	Penumbral	1.5600	108	1933 Aug 05	Penumbral	−1.4216
113	1934 Jan 30	Partial	0.9258	118	1934 Jul 26	Partial	−0.6681
123	1935 Jan 19	Total	0.2498	128	1935 Jul 16	Total	0.0672
133	1936 Jan 08	Total	−0.4429	138	1936 Jul 04	Partial	0.8642
143	1936 Dec 28	Penumbral	−1.0971				

=== Saros 133 ===
This eclipse is a part of Saros series 133, repeating every 18 years, 11 days, and containing 71 events. The series started with a penumbral lunar eclipse on May 13, 1557. It contains partial eclipses from August 7, 1683 through December 17, 1899; total eclipses from December 28, 1917 through August 3, 2278; and a second set of partial eclipses from August 14, 2296 through March 11, 2639. The series ends at member 71 as a penumbral eclipse on June 29, 2819.

The longest duration of totality will be produced by member 35 at 101 minutes, 41 seconds on May 30, 2170. All eclipses in this series occur at the Moon’s descending node of orbit.

Greatest	First			
The greatest eclipse of the series will occur on 2170 May 30, lasting 101 minutes, 41 seconds.	Penumbral	Partial	Total	Central
The greatest eclipse of the series will occur on 2170 May 30, lasting 101 minutes, 41 seconds.	1557 May 13	1683 Aug 07	1917 Dec 28	2098 Apr 15
The greatest eclipse of the series will occur on 2170 May 30, lasting 101 minutes, 41 seconds.	Last			
The greatest eclipse of the series will occur on 2170 May 30, lasting 101 minutes, 41 seconds.	Central	Total	Partial	Penumbral
The greatest eclipse of the series will occur on 2170 May 30, lasting 101 minutes, 41 seconds.	2224 Jul 01	2278 Aug 03	2639 Mar 11	2819 Jun 29

Eclipses are tabulated in three columns; every third eclipse in the same column is one exeligmos apart, so they all cast shadows over approximately the same parts of the Earth.

Series members 15–36 occur between 1801 and 2200:
15	16	17
1809 Oct 23	1827 Nov 03	1845 Nov 14
18	19	20
1863 Nov 25	1881 Dec 05	1899 Dec 17
21	22	23
1917 Dec 28	1936 Jan 08	1954 Jan 19
24	25	26
1972 Jan 30	1990 Feb 09	2008 Feb 21
27	28	29
2026 Mar 03	2044 Mar 13	2062 Mar 25
30	31	32
2080 Apr 04	2098 Apr 15	2116 Apr 27
33	34	35
2134 May 08	2152 May 18	2170 May 30
36
2188 Jun 09

=== Tritos series ===
This eclipse is a part of a tritos cycle, repeating at alternating nodes every 135 synodic months (≈ 3986.63 days, or 11 years minus 1 month). Their appearance and longitude are irregular due to a lack of synchronization with the anomalistic month (period of perigee), but groupings of 3 tritos cycles (≈ 33 years minus 3 months) come close (≈ 434.044 anomalistic months), so eclipses are similar in these groupings.

Series members between 1801 and 2187
1805 Jan 15 (Saros 121)	1815 Dec 16 (Saros 122)	1826 Nov 14 (Saros 123)	1837 Oct 13 (Saros 124)	1848 Sep 13 (Saros 125)
1859 Aug 13 (Saros 126)	1870 Jul 12 (Saros 127)	1881 Jun 12 (Saros 128)	1892 May 11 (Saros 129)	1903 Apr 12 (Saros 130)
1914 Mar 12 (Saros 131)	1925 Feb 08 (Saros 132)	1936 Jan 08 (Saros 133)	1946 Dec 08 (Saros 134)	1957 Nov 07 (Saros 135)
1968 Oct 06 (Saros 136)	1979 Sep 06 (Saros 137)	1990 Aug 06 (Saros 138)	2001 Jul 05 (Saros 139)	2012 Jun 04 (Saros 140)
2023 May 05 (Saros 141)	2034 Apr 03 (Saros 142)	2045 Mar 03 (Saros 143)	2056 Feb 01 (Saros 144)	2066 Dec 31 (Saros 145)
2077 Nov 29 (Saros 146)	2088 Oct 30 (Saros 147)	2099 Sep 29 (Saros 148)	2110 Aug 29 (Saros 149)	2121 Jul 30 (Saros 150)
2132 Jun 28 (Saros 151)	2143 May 28 (Saros 152)	2154 Apr 28 (Saros 153)		
2187 Jan 24 (Saros 156)

=== Inex series ===
This eclipse is a part of the long period inex cycle, repeating at alternating nodes, every 358 synodic months (≈ 10,571.95 days, or 29 years minus 20 days). Their appearance and longitude are irregular due to a lack of synchronization with the anomalistic month (period of perigee). However, groupings of 3 inex cycles (≈ 87 years minus 2 months) comes close (≈ 1,151.02 anomalistic months), so eclipses are similar in these groupings.

Series members between 1801 and 2200
1820 Mar 29 (Saros 129)	1849 Mar 09 (Saros 130)	1878 Feb 17 (Saros 131)
1907 Jan 29 (Saros 132)	1936 Jan 08 (Saros 133)	1964 Dec 19 (Saros 134)
1993 Nov 29 (Saros 135)	2022 Nov 08 (Saros 136)	2051 Oct 19 (Saros 137)
2080 Sep 29 (Saros 138)	2109 Sep 09 (Saros 139)	2138 Aug 20 (Saros 140)
2167 Aug 01 (Saros 141)	2196 Jul 10 (Saros 142)	

=== Half-Saros cycle ===
A lunar eclipse will be preceded and followed by solar eclipses by 9 years and 5.5 days (a half saros). This lunar eclipse is related to two annular solar eclipses of Solar Saros 140.

January 3, 1927	January 14, 1945

== See also ==
- List of lunar eclipses
- List of 20th-century lunar eclipses
