= January 1954 lunar eclipse =

Total lunar eclipse January 19, 1954

- Total eclipse
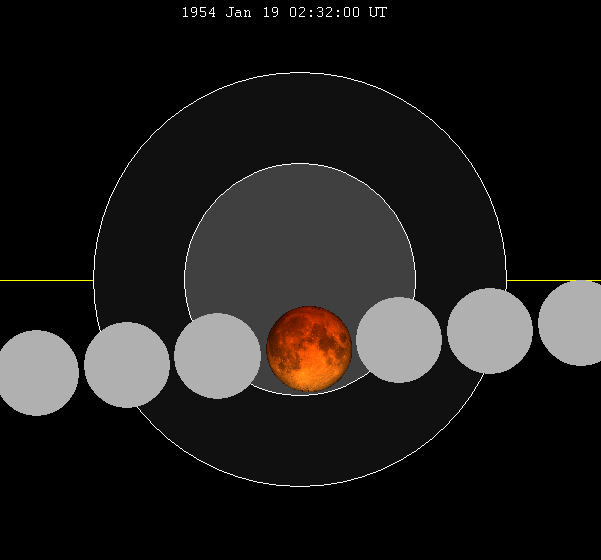
- The Moon's hourly motion shown right to left
- Date: January 19, 1954
- Gamma: −0.4357
- Magnitude: 1.0322
- Saros cycle: 133 (23 of 71)
- Totality: 28 minutes, 12 seconds
- Partiality: 202 minutes, 53 seconds
- Penumbral: 341 minutes, 12 seconds
Contacts (UTC)
- P1: 23:41:17
- U1: 0:50:22
- U2: 2:17:43
- Greatest: 2:31:50
- U3: 2:45:55
- U4: 4:13:15
- P4: 5:22:29

A total lunar eclipse occurred at the Moon’s descending node of orbit on Tuesday, January 19, 1954, with an umbral magnitude of 1.0322. A lunar eclipse occurs when the Moon moves into the Earth's shadow, causing the Moon to be darkened. A total lunar eclipse occurs when the Moon's near side entirely passes into the Earth's umbral shadow. Unlike a solar eclipse, which can only be viewed from a relatively small area of the world, a lunar eclipse may be viewed from anywhere on the night side of Earth. A total lunar eclipse can last up to nearly two hours, while a total solar eclipse lasts only a few minutes at any given place, because the Moon's shadow is smaller. Occurring about 6.4 days before apogee (on January 25, 1954, at 12:20 UTC), the Moon's apparent diameter was smaller.

== Visibility ==
The eclipse was completely visible over much of North and South America, west Africa, and Europe, seen rising over western North America and the eastern Pacific Ocean and setting over southern and east Africa and much of Asia.

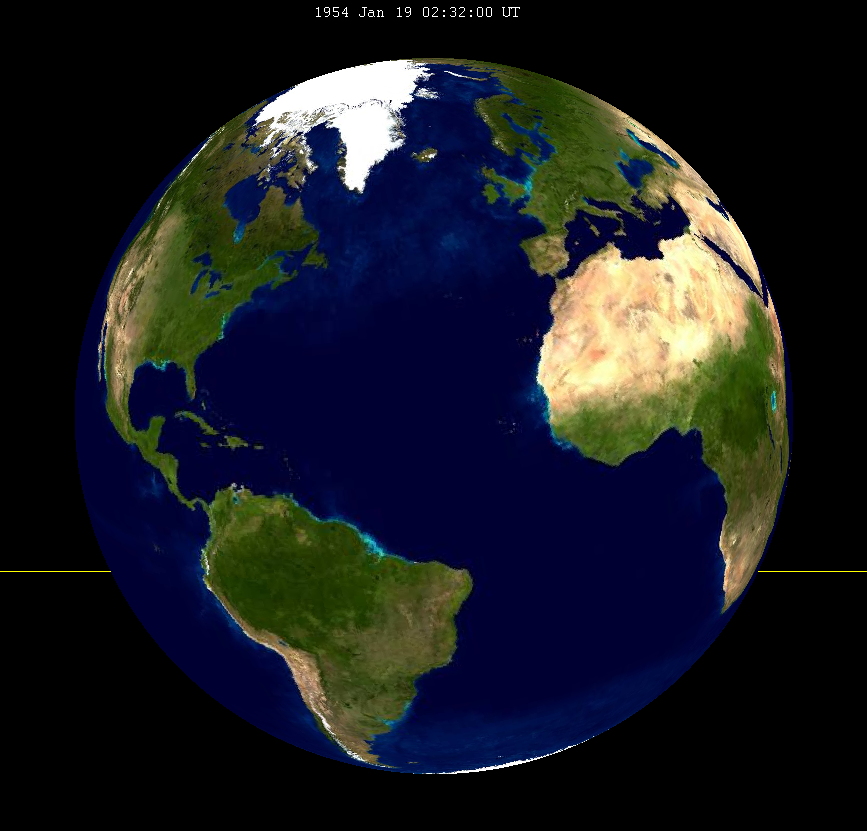
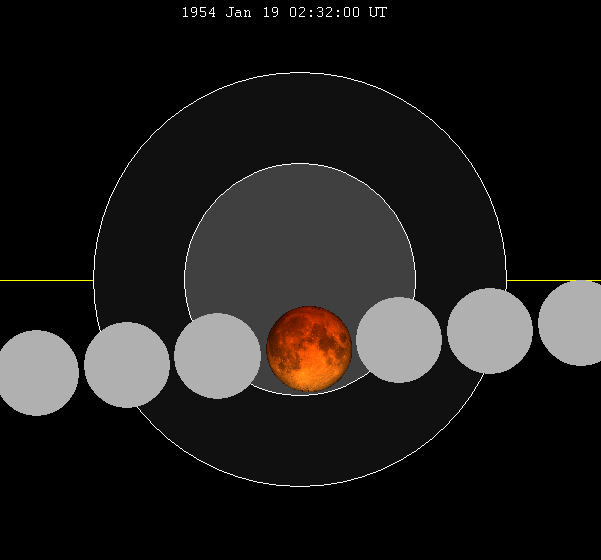

== Eclipse details ==
Shown below is a table displaying details about this particular lunar eclipse. It describes various parameters pertaining to this eclipse.

January 19, 1954 Lunar Eclipse Parameters
Parameter	Value
Penumbral Magnitude	2.08525
Umbral Magnitude	1.03216
Gamma	−0.43573
Sun Right Ascension	20h02m25.4s
Sun Declination	-20°28'09.9"
Sun Semi-Diameter	16'15.3"
Sun Equatorial Horizontal Parallax	08.9"
Moon Right Ascension	08h01m54.0s
Moon Declination	+20°04'36.5"
Moon Semi-Diameter	15'26.2"
Moon Equatorial Horizontal Parallax	0°56'39.0"
ΔT	30.7 s

== Eclipse season ==
This eclipse is part of an eclipse season, a period, roughly every six months, when eclipses occur. Only two (or occasionally three) eclipse seasons occur each year, and each season lasts about 35 days and repeats just short of six months (173 days) later; thus two full eclipse seasons always occur each year. Either two or three eclipses happen each eclipse season. In the sequence below, each eclipse is separated by a fortnight.

Eclipse season of January 1954
January 5 Ascending node (new moon)	January 19 Descending node (full moon)
Annular solar eclipse Solar Saros 121	Total lunar eclipse Lunar Saros 133

== Related eclipses ==
=== Eclipses in 1954 ===
- An annular solar eclipse on January 5.
- A total lunar eclipse on January 19.
- A total solar eclipse on June 30.
- A partial lunar eclipse on July 16.
- An annular solar eclipse on December 25.

=== Metonic ===
- Preceded by: Lunar eclipse of April 2, 1950
- Followed by: Lunar eclipse of November 7, 1957

=== Tzolkinex ===
- Preceded by: Lunar eclipse of December 8, 1946
- Followed by: Lunar eclipse of March 2, 1961

=== Half-Saros ===
- Preceded by: Solar eclipse of January 14, 1945
- Followed by: Solar eclipse of January 25, 1963

=== Tritos ===
- Preceded by: Lunar eclipse of February 20, 1943
- Followed by: Lunar eclipse of December 19, 1964

=== Lunar Saros 133 ===
- Preceded by: Lunar eclipse of January 8, 1936
- Followed by: Lunar eclipse of January 30, 1972

=== Inex ===
- Preceded by: Lunar eclipse of February 8, 1925
- Followed by: Lunar eclipse of December 30, 1982

=== Triad ===
- Preceded by: Lunar eclipse of March 20, 1867
- Followed by: Lunar eclipse of November 18, 2040

=== Lunar eclipses of 1951–1955 ===
This eclipse is a member of a semester series. An eclipse in a semester series of lunar eclipses repeats approximately every 177 days and 4 hours (a semester) at alternating nodes of the Moon's orbit.

The penumbral lunar eclipses on March 23, 1951 and September 15, 1951 occur in the previous lunar year eclipse set, and the lunar eclipses on June 5, 1955 (penumbral) and November 29, 1955 (partial) occur in the next lunar year eclipse set.

Lunar eclipse series sets from 1951 to 1955
Descending node				Ascending node			
Saros	Date Viewing	Type Chart	Gamma	Saros	Date Viewing	Type Chart	Gamma
103	1951 Feb 21	Penumbral	−	108	1951 Aug 17	Penumbral	−1.4828
113	1952 Feb 11	Partial	0.9416	118	1952 Aug 05	Partial	−0.7384
123	1953 Jan 29	Total	0.2606	128	1953 Jul 26	Total	−0.0071
133	1954 Jan 19	Total	−0.4357	138	1954 Jul 16	Partial	0.7877
143	1955 Jan 08	Penumbral	−1.0907				

=== Saros 133 ===
This eclipse is a part of Saros series 133, repeating every 18 years, 11 days, and containing 71 events. The series started with a penumbral lunar eclipse on May 13, 1557. It contains partial eclipses from August 7, 1683 through December 17, 1899; total eclipses from December 28, 1917 through August 3, 2278; and a second set of partial eclipses from August 14, 2296 through March 11, 2639. The series ends at member 71 as a penumbral eclipse on June 29, 2819.

The longest duration of totality will be produced by member 35 at 101 minutes, 41 seconds on May 30, 2170. All eclipses in this series occur at the Moon’s descending node of orbit.

Greatest	First			
The greatest eclipse of the series will occur on 2170 May 30, lasting 101 minutes, 41 seconds.	Penumbral	Partial	Total	Central
The greatest eclipse of the series will occur on 2170 May 30, lasting 101 minutes, 41 seconds.	1557 May 13	1683 Aug 07	1917 Dec 28	2098 Apr 15
The greatest eclipse of the series will occur on 2170 May 30, lasting 101 minutes, 41 seconds.	Last			
The greatest eclipse of the series will occur on 2170 May 30, lasting 101 minutes, 41 seconds.	Central	Total	Partial	Penumbral
The greatest eclipse of the series will occur on 2170 May 30, lasting 101 minutes, 41 seconds.	2224 Jul 01	2278 Aug 03	2639 Mar 11	2819 Jun 29

Eclipses are tabulated in three columns; every third eclipse in the same column is one exeligmos apart, so they all cast shadows over approximately the same parts of the Earth.

Series members 15–36 occur between 1801 and 2200:
15	16	17
1809 Oct 23	1827 Nov 03	1845 Nov 14
18	19	20
1863 Nov 25	1881 Dec 05	1899 Dec 17
21	22	23
1917 Dec 28	1936 Jan 08	1954 Jan 19
24	25	26
1972 Jan 30	1990 Feb 09	2008 Feb 21
27	28	29
2026 Mar 03	2044 Mar 13	2062 Mar 25
30	31	32
2080 Apr 04	2098 Apr 15	2116 Apr 27
33	34	35
2134 May 08	2152 May 18	2170 May 30
36
2188 Jun 09

=== Tritos series ===
This eclipse is a part of a tritos cycle, repeating at alternating nodes every 135 synodic months (≈ 3986.63 days, or 11 years minus 1 month). Their appearance and longitude are irregular due to a lack of synchronization with the anomalistic month (period of perigee), but groupings of 3 tritos cycles (≈ 33 years minus 3 months) come close (≈ 434.044 anomalistic months), so eclipses are similar in these groupings.

Series members between 1801 and 2200
1801 Mar 30 (Saros 119)	1812 Feb 27 (Saros 120)	1823 Jan 26 (Saros 121)	1833 Dec 26 (Saros 122)	1844 Nov 24 (Saros 123)
1855 Oct 25 (Saros 124)	1866 Sep 24 (Saros 125)	1877 Aug 23 (Saros 126)	1888 Jul 23 (Saros 127)	1899 Jun 23 (Saros 128)
1910 May 24 (Saros 129)	1921 Apr 22 (Saros 130)	1932 Mar 22 (Saros 131)	1943 Feb 20 (Saros 132)	1954 Jan 19 (Saros 133)
1964 Dec 19 (Saros 134)	1975 Nov 18 (Saros 135)	1986 Oct 17 (Saros 136)	1997 Sep 16 (Saros 137)	2008 Aug 16 (Saros 138)
2019 Jul 16 (Saros 139)	2030 Jun 15 (Saros 140)	2041 May 16 (Saros 141)	2052 Apr 14 (Saros 142)	2063 Mar 14 (Saros 143)
2074 Feb 11 (Saros 144)	2085 Jan 10 (Saros 145)	2095 Dec 11 (Saros 146)	2106 Nov 11 (Saros 147)	2117 Oct 10 (Saros 148)
2128 Sep 09 (Saros 149)	2139 Aug 10 (Saros 150)	2150 Jul 09 (Saros 151)	2161 Jun 08 (Saros 152)	2172 May 08 (Saros 153)
	2194 Mar 07 (Saros 155)			

=== Inex series ===
This eclipse is a part of the long period inex cycle, repeating at alternating nodes, every 358 synodic months (≈ 10,571.95 days, or 29 years minus 20 days). Their appearance and longitude are irregular due to a lack of synchronization with the anomalistic month (period of perigee). However, groupings of 3 inex cycles (≈ 87 years minus 2 months) comes close (≈ 1,151.02 anomalistic months), so eclipses are similar in these groupings.

Series members between 1801 and 2200
1809 Apr 30 (Saros 128)	1838 Apr 10 (Saros 129)	1867 Mar 20 (Saros 130)
1896 Feb 28 (Saros 131)	1925 Feb 08 (Saros 132)	1954 Jan 19 (Saros 133)
1982 Dec 30 (Saros 134)	2011 Dec 10 (Saros 135)	2040 Nov 18 (Saros 136)
2069 Oct 30 (Saros 137)	2098 Oct 10 (Saros 138)	2127 Sep 20 (Saros 139)
2156 Aug 30 (Saros 140)	2185 Aug 11 (Saros 141)	

=== Half-Saros cycle ===
A lunar eclipse will be preceded and followed by solar eclipses by 9 years and 5.5 days (a half saros). This lunar eclipse is related to two annular solar eclipses of Solar Saros 140.

January 14, 1945	January 25, 1963

== See also ==
- List of lunar eclipses
- List of 20th-century lunar eclipses
