= May 2170 lunar eclipse =

Spectacular lunar eclipse

- Total eclipse
- Date: May 29–30, 2170
- Gamma: 0.0174
- Magnitude: 1.8330
- Saros cycle: 133 (35 of 71)
- Totality: 101 minutes, 41 seconds
- Partiality: 219 minutes, 22 seconds
- Penumbral: 335 minutes, 22 seconds
Contacts (UTC)
- P1: 22:04:00
- U1: 23:01:56
- U2: 0:00:47
- Greatest: 0:51:38
- U3: 1:42:28
- U4: 2:41:18
- P4: 3:39:22

A total lunar eclipse will occur at the Moon’s descending node of orbit on Tuesday, May 29 and Wednesday, May 30, 2170, with an umbral magnitude of 1.7488. It will be a central lunar eclipse, in which part of the Moon will pass through the center of the Earth's shadow. A lunar eclipse occurs when the Moon moves into the Earth's shadow, causing the Moon to be darkened. A total lunar eclipse occurs when the Moon's near side entirely passes into the Earth's umbral shadow. Unlike a solar eclipse, which can only be viewed from a relatively small area of the world, a lunar eclipse may be viewed from anywhere on the night side of Earth. A total lunar eclipse can last up to nearly two hours, while a total solar eclipse lasts only a few minutes at any given place, because the Moon's shadow is smaller. Occurring about 3.6 days after perigee (on May 26, 2170, at 10:15 UTC), the Moon's apparent diameter will be larger.

This will be the greatest lunar eclipse of Lunar Saros 133 as well as the largest and darkest lunar eclipse of the 22nd century.

== Visibility ==
The eclipse will be completely visible over central and eastern South America, western Europe, and much of Africa, seen rising over western South America and much of North America and setting over eastern Europe, the western half of Asia, and western Australia.

== Eclipse details ==
Shown below is a table displaying details about this particular lunar eclipse. It describes various parameters pertaining to this eclipse.

May 29–30, 2170 Lunar Eclipse Parameters
Parameter	Value
Penumbral Magnitude	2.81880
Umbral Magnitude	1.83301
Gamma	0.01743
Sun Right Ascension	04h28m29.8s
Sun Declination	+21°45'15.5"
Sun Semi-Diameter	15'47.2"
Sun Equatorial Horizontal Parallax	08.7"
Moon Right Ascension	16h28m30.9s
Moon Declination	-21°44'16.0"
Moon Semi-Diameter	16'00.8"
Moon Equatorial Horizontal Parallax	0°58'46.3"
ΔT	219.6 s

== Eclipse season ==
This eclipse is part of an eclipse season, a period, roughly every six months, when eclipses occur. Only two (or occasionally three) eclipse seasons occur each year, and each season lasts about 35 days and repeats just short of six months (173 days) later; thus two full eclipse seasons always occur each year. Either two or three eclipses happen each eclipse season. In the sequence below, each eclipse is separated by a fortnight. The first and last eclipse in this sequence is separated by one synodic month.

Eclipse season of May–June 2170
May 15–16 Ascending node (new moon)	May 29–30 Descending node (full moon)	June 14 Ascending node (new moon)
Partial solar eclipse Solar Saros 121	Total lunar eclipse Lunar Saros 133	Partial solar eclipse Solar Saros 159

== Related eclipses ==
=== Eclipses in 2170 ===
- A partial solar eclipse on May 15–16.
- A total lunar eclipse on May 29–30.
- A partial solar eclipse on June 14.
- A partial solar eclipse on November 8.
- A total lunar eclipse on November 23.
- A partial solar eclipse on December 7.

=== Metonic ===
- Preceded by: Lunar eclipse of August 11, 2166
- Followed by: Lunar eclipse of March 18, 2174

=== Tzolkinex ===
- Preceded by: Lunar eclipse of April 18–19, 2163
- Followed by: Lunar eclipse of July 10–11, 2177

=== Half-Saros ===
- Preceded by: Solar eclipse of May 25, 2161
- Followed by: Solar eclipse of June 5, 2179

=== Tritos ===
- Preceded by: Lunar eclipse of June 30, 2159
- Followed by: Lunar eclipse of April 29, 2181

=== Lunar Saros 133 ===
- Preceded by: Lunar eclipse of May 18, 2152
- Followed by: Lunar eclipse of June 9, 2188

=== Inex ===
- Preceded by: Lunar eclipse of June 19, 2141
- Followed by: Lunar eclipse of May 10, 2199

=== Triad ===
- Preceded by: Lunar eclipse of July 28–29, 2083
- Followed by: Lunar eclipse of March 30, 2257

=== Lunar eclipses of 2168–2172 ===
This eclipse is a member of a semester series. An eclipse in a semester series of lunar eclipses repeats approximately every 177 days and 4 hours (a semester) at alternating nodes of the Moon's orbit.

The lunar eclipses on January 24, 2168 (partial), July 20, 2168 (penumbral), and January 13, 2169 (penumbral) occur in the previous lunar year eclipse set, and the penumbral lunar eclipses on April 8–9, 2172 and October 2, 2172 occur in the next lunar year eclipse set.

Lunar eclipse series sets from 2168 to 2172
Ascending node				Descending node			
Saros	Date Viewing	Type Chart	Gamma	Saros	Date Viewing	Type Chart	Gamma
118	2168 Dec 14	Penumbral	−1.1945	123	2169 Jun 9	Partial	0.8158
128	2169 Dec 4	Partial	−0.5488	133	2170 May 29–30	Total	0.0174
138	2170 Nov 23	Total	0.1554	143	2171 May 19	Partial	−0.7166
148	2171 Nov 12	Partial	0.8584	153	2172 May 8	Penumbral	−1.4275
158	2172 Oct 31	Penumbral	1.5197				

=== Saros 133 ===
This eclipse is a part of Saros series 133, repeating every 18 years, 11 days, and containing 71 events. The series started with a penumbral lunar eclipse on May 13, 1557. It contains partial eclipses from August 7, 1683 through December 17, 1899; total eclipses from December 28, 1917 through August 3, 2278; and a second set of partial eclipses from August 14, 2296 through March 11, 2639. The series ends at member 71 as a penumbral eclipse on June 29, 2819.

The longest duration of totality will be produced by member 35 at 101 minutes, 41 seconds on May 30, 2170. All eclipses in this series occur at the Moon’s descending node of orbit.

Greatest	First			
The greatest eclipse of the series will occur on 2170 May 30, lasting 101 minutes, 41 seconds.	Penumbral	Partial	Total	Central
The greatest eclipse of the series will occur on 2170 May 30, lasting 101 minutes, 41 seconds.	1557 May 13	1683 Aug 07	1917 Dec 28	2098 Apr 15
The greatest eclipse of the series will occur on 2170 May 30, lasting 101 minutes, 41 seconds.	Last			
The greatest eclipse of the series will occur on 2170 May 30, lasting 101 minutes, 41 seconds.	Central	Total	Partial	Penumbral
The greatest eclipse of the series will occur on 2170 May 30, lasting 101 minutes, 41 seconds.	2224 Jul 01	2278 Aug 03	2639 Mar 11	2819 Jun 29

Eclipses are tabulated in three columns; every third eclipse in the same column is one exeligmos apart, so they all cast shadows over approximately the same parts of the Earth.

Series members 15–36 occur between 1801 and 2200:
15	16	17
1809 Oct 23	1827 Nov 03	1845 Nov 14
18	19	20
1863 Nov 25	1881 Dec 05	1899 Dec 17
21	22	23
1917 Dec 28	1936 Jan 08	1954 Jan 19
24	25	26
1972 Jan 30	1990 Feb 09	2008 Feb 21
27	28	29
2026 Mar 03	2044 Mar 13	2062 Mar 25
30	31	32
2080 Apr 04	2098 Apr 15	2116 Apr 27
33	34	35
2134 May 08	2152 May 18	2170 May 30
36
2188 Jun 09

=== Tritos series ===
This eclipse is a part of a tritos cycle, repeating at alternating nodes every 135 synodic months (≈ 3986.63 days, or 11 years minus 1 month). Their appearance and longitude are irregular due to a lack of synchronization with the anomalistic month (period of perigee), but groupings of 3 tritos cycles (≈ 33 years minus 3 months) come close (≈ 434.044 anomalistic months), so eclipses are similar in these groupings.

Series members between 1801 and 2200
1810 Mar 21 (Saros 100)	1821 Feb 17 (Saros 101)	1832 Jan 17 (Saros 102)	1842 Dec 17 (Saros 103)	
1864 Oct 15 (Saros 105)	1875 Sep 15 (Saros 106)	1886 Aug 14 (Saros 107)	1897 Jul 14 (Saros 108)	1908 Jun 14 (Saros 109)
1919 May 15 (Saros 110)	1930 Apr 13 (Saros 111)	1941 Mar 13 (Saros 112)	1952 Feb 11 (Saros 113)	1963 Jan 09 (Saros 114)
1973 Dec 10 (Saros 115)	1984 Nov 08 (Saros 116)	1995 Oct 08 (Saros 117)	2006 Sep 07 (Saros 118)	2017 Aug 07 (Saros 119)
2028 Jul 06 (Saros 120)	2039 Jun 06 (Saros 121)	2050 May 06 (Saros 122)	2061 Apr 04 (Saros 123)	2072 Mar 04 (Saros 124)
2083 Feb 02 (Saros 125)	2094 Jan 01 (Saros 126)	2104 Dec 02 (Saros 127)	2115 Nov 02 (Saros 128)	2126 Oct 01 (Saros 129)
2137 Aug 30 (Saros 130)	2148 Jul 31 (Saros 131)	2159 Jun 30 (Saros 132)	2170 May 30 (Saros 133)	2181 Apr 29 (Saros 134)
2192 Mar 28 (Saros 135)

=== Inex series ===
This eclipse is a part of the long period inex cycle, repeating at alternating nodes, every 358 synodic months (≈ 10,571.95 days, or 29 years minus 20 days). Their appearance and longitude are irregular due to a lack of synchronization with the anomalistic month (period of perigee). However, groupings of 3 inex cycles (≈ 87 years minus 2 months) comes close (≈ 1,151.02 anomalistic months), so eclipses are similar in these groupings.

Series members between 1801 and 2200
1823 Jan 26 (Saros 121)	1852 Jan 07 (Saros 122)	1880 Dec 16 (Saros 123)
1909 Nov 27 (Saros 124)	1938 Nov 07 (Saros 125)	1967 Oct 18 (Saros 126)
1996 Sep 27 (Saros 127)	2025 Sep 07 (Saros 128)	2054 Aug 18 (Saros 129)
2083 Jul 29 (Saros 130)	2112 Jul 09 (Saros 131)	2141 Jun 19 (Saros 132)
2170 May 30 (Saros 133)	2199 May 10 (Saros 134)	

=== Half-Saros cycle ===
A lunar eclipse will be preceded and followed by solar eclipses by 9 years and 5.5 days (a half saros). This lunar eclipse is related to two annular solar eclipses of Solar Saros 140.

May 25, 2161	June 5, 2179
