= March 2044 lunar eclipse =

Astronomical event

- Total eclipse
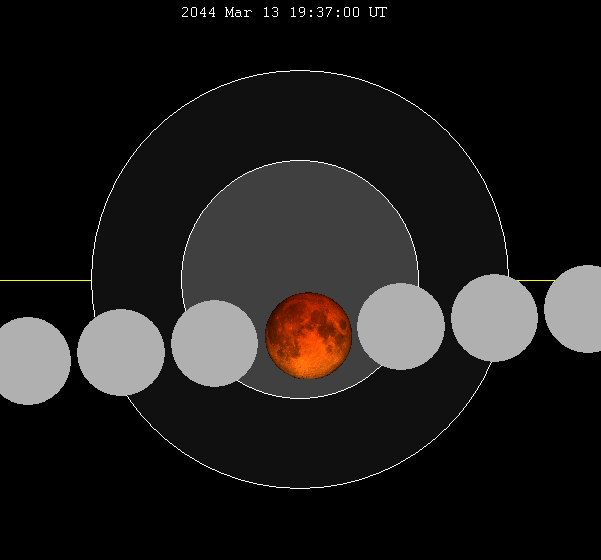
- The Moon's hourly motion shown right to left
- Date: March 13, 2044
- Gamma: −0.3496
- Magnitude: 1.2050
- Saros cycle: 133 (28 of 71)
- Totality: 66 minutes, 25 seconds
- Partiality: 209 minutes, 5 seconds
- Penumbral: 338 minutes, 23 seconds
Contacts (UTC)
- P1: 16:47:56
- U1: 17:52:31
- U2: 19:03:51
- Greatest: 19:37:05
- U3: 20:10:16
- U4: 21:21:35
- P4: 22:26:19

A total lunar eclipse will occur at the Moon’s descending node of orbit on Sunday, March 13, 2044, with an umbral magnitude of 1.2050. A lunar eclipse occurs when the Moon moves into the Earth's shadow, causing the Moon to be darkened. A total lunar eclipse occurs when the Moon's near side entirely passes into the Earth's umbral shadow. Unlike a solar eclipse, which can only be viewed from a relatively small area of the world, a lunar eclipse may be viewed from anywhere on the night side of Earth. A total lunar eclipse can last up to nearly two hours, while a total solar eclipse lasts only a few minutes at any given place, because the Moon's shadow is smaller. Occurring about 6.2 days after perigee (on March 7, 2044, at 15:30 UTC), the Moon's apparent diameter will be larger.

This lunar eclipse is the third of a tetrad, with four total lunar eclipses in series, the others being on March 25, 2043; September 19, 2043; and September 7, 2044.

== Visibility ==
The eclipse will be completely visible over east Africa, eastern Europe, and much of Asia, seen rising over west Africa, western Europe, and eastern South America and setting over northeast Asia and Australia.

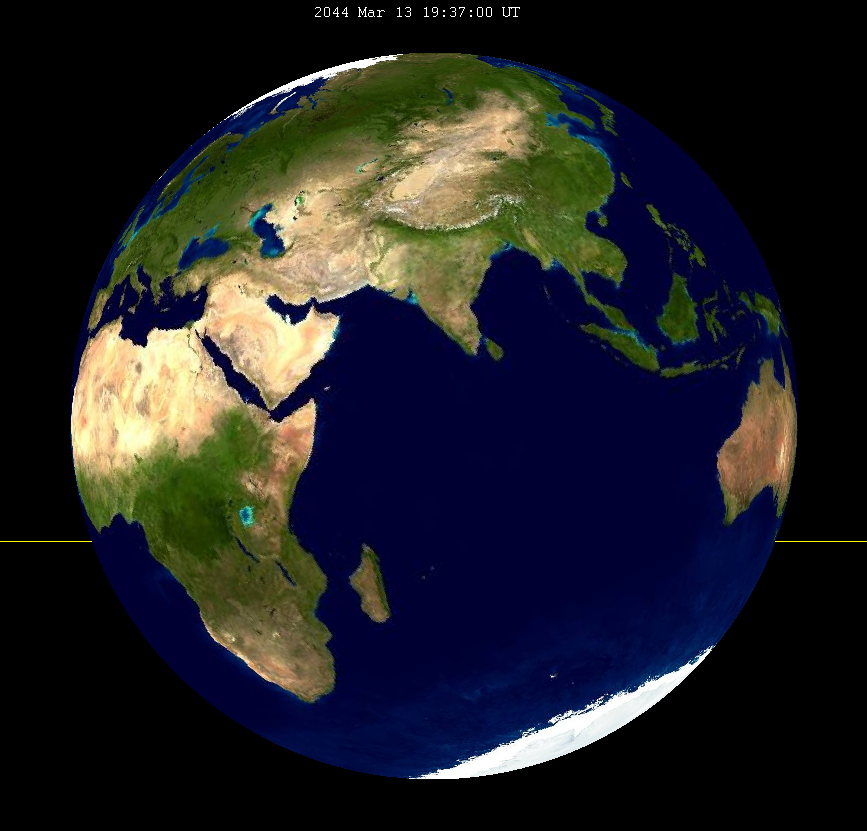
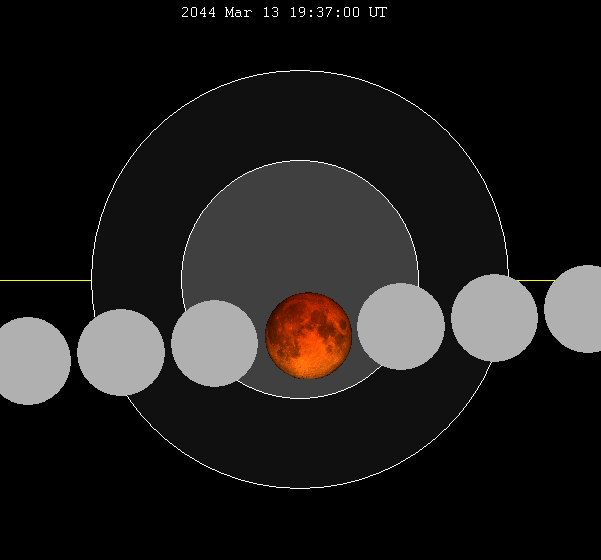

== Eclipse details ==
Shown below is a table displaying details about this particular eclipse. It describes various parameters pertaining to this eclipse.

March 13, 2044 Lunar Eclipse Parameters
Parameter	Value
Penumbral Magnitude	2.23223
Umbral Magnitude	1.20503
Gamma	−0.34957
Sun Right Ascension	23h37m30.3s
Sun Declination	-02°25'56.9"
Sun Semi-Diameter	16'05.4"
Sun Equatorial Horizontal Parallax	08.8"
Moon Right Ascension	11h36m51.3s
Moon Declination	+02°08'22.5"
Moon Semi-Diameter	15'39.8"
Moon Equatorial Horizontal Parallax	0°57'29.1"
ΔT	81.5 s

== Eclipse season ==
This eclipse is part of an eclipse season, a period, roughly every six months, when eclipses occur. Only two (or occasionally three) eclipse seasons occur each year, and each season lasts about 35 days and repeats just short of six months (173 days) later; thus two full eclipse seasons always occur each year. Either two or three eclipses happen each eclipse season. In the sequence below, each eclipse is separated by a fortnight.

Eclipse season of February–March 2044
February 28 Ascending node (new moon)	March 13 Descending node (full moon)
Annular solar eclipse Solar Saros 121	Total lunar eclipse Lunar Saros 133

== Related eclipses ==
=== Eclipses in 2044 ===
- An annular solar eclipse on February 28.
- A total lunar eclipse on March 13.
- A total solar eclipse on August 23.
- A total lunar eclipse on September 7.

=== Metonic ===
- Preceded by: Lunar eclipse of May 26, 2040
- Followed by: Lunar eclipse of January 1, 2048

=== Tzolkinex ===
- Preceded by: Lunar eclipse of January 31, 2037
- Followed by: Lunar eclipse of April 26, 2051

=== Half-Saros ===
- Preceded by: Solar eclipse of March 9, 2035
- Followed by: Solar eclipse of March 20, 2053

=== Tritos ===
- Preceded by: Lunar eclipse of April 14, 2033
- Followed by: Lunar eclipse of February 11, 2055

=== Lunar Saros 133 ===
- Preceded by: Lunar eclipse of March 3, 2026
- Followed by: Lunar eclipse of March 25, 2062

=== Inex ===
- Preceded by: Lunar eclipse of April 4, 2015
- Followed by: Lunar eclipse of February 22, 2073

=== Triad ===
- Preceded by: Lunar eclipse of May 13, 1957
- Followed by: Lunar eclipse of January 13, 2131

=== Lunar eclipses of 2042–2045 ===
This eclipse is a member of a semester series. An eclipse in a semester series of lunar eclipses repeats approximately every 177 days and 4 hours (a semester) at alternating nodes of the Moon's orbit.

The penumbral lunar eclipse on October 28, 2042 occurs in the previous lunar year eclipse set.

Lunar eclipse series sets from 2042 to 2045
Descending node				Ascending node			
Saros	Date Viewing	Type Chart	Gamma	Saros	Date Viewing	Type Chart	Gamma
113	2042 Apr 05	Penumbral	1.1080	118	2042 Sep 29	Penumbral	−1.0261
123	2043 Mar 25	Total	0.3849	128	2043 Sep 19	Total	−0.3316
133	2044 Mar 13	Total	−0.3496	138	2044 Sep 07	Total	0.4318
143	2045 Mar 03	Penumbral	−1.0274	148	2045 Aug 27	Penumbral	1.2060

=== Metonic series ===
The Metonic cycle repeats nearly exactly every 19 years and represents a Saros cycle plus one lunar year. Because it occurs on the same calendar date, the Earth's shadow will in nearly the same location relative to the background stars.

1. 2006 Mar 14.99 - penumbral (113); 2. 2025 Mar 14.29 - total (123); 3. 2044 Mar 13.82 - total (133); 4. 2063 Mar 14.67- partial (143)	1. 2006 Sep 07.79 - partial (118); 2. 2025 Sep 07.76 - total (128); 3. 2044 Sep 07.47 - partial (138); 4. 2063 Sep 07.86 - penumbral (148)

=== Saros 133 ===
This eclipse is a part of Saros series 133, repeating every 18 years, 11 days, and containing 71 events. The series started with a penumbral lunar eclipse on May 13, 1557. It contains partial eclipses from August 7, 1683 through December 17, 1899; total eclipses from December 28, 1917 through August 3, 2278; and a second set of partial eclipses from August 14, 2296 through March 11, 2639. The series ends at member 71 as a penumbral eclipse on June 29, 2819.

The longest duration of totality will be produced by member 35 at 101 minutes, 41 seconds on May 30, 2170. All eclipses in this series occur at the Moon’s descending node of orbit.

Greatest	First			
The greatest eclipse of the series will occur on 2170 May 30, lasting 101 minutes, 41 seconds.	Penumbral	Partial	Total	Central
The greatest eclipse of the series will occur on 2170 May 30, lasting 101 minutes, 41 seconds.	1557 May 13	1683 Aug 07	1917 Dec 28	2098 Apr 15
The greatest eclipse of the series will occur on 2170 May 30, lasting 101 minutes, 41 seconds.	Last			
The greatest eclipse of the series will occur on 2170 May 30, lasting 101 minutes, 41 seconds.	Central	Total	Partial	Penumbral
The greatest eclipse of the series will occur on 2170 May 30, lasting 101 minutes, 41 seconds.	2224 Jul 01	2278 Aug 03	2639 Mar 11	2819 Jun 29

Eclipses are tabulated in three columns; every third eclipse in the same column is one exeligmos apart, so they all cast shadows over approximately the same parts of the Earth.

Series members 15–36 occur between 1801 and 2200:
15	16	17
1809 Oct 23	1827 Nov 03	1845 Nov 14
18	19	20
1863 Nov 25	1881 Dec 05	1899 Dec 17
21	22	23
1917 Dec 28	1936 Jan 08	1954 Jan 19
24	25	26
1972 Jan 30	1990 Feb 09	2008 Feb 21
27	28	29
2026 Mar 03	2044 Mar 13	2062 Mar 25
30	31	32
2080 Apr 04	2098 Apr 15	2116 Apr 27
33	34	35
2134 May 08	2152 May 18	2170 May 30
36
2188 Jun 09

=== Tritos series ===
This eclipse is a part of a tritos cycle, repeating at alternating nodes every 135 synodic months (≈ 3986.63 days, or 11 years minus 1 month). Their appearance and longitude are irregular due to a lack of synchronization with the anomalistic month (period of perigee), but groupings of 3 tritos cycles (≈ 33 years minus 3 months) come close (≈ 434.044 anomalistic months), so eclipses are similar in these groupings.

Series members between 1801 and 2200
1804 Jan 26 (Saros 111)	1814 Dec 26 (Saros 112)	1825 Nov 25 (Saros 113)	1836 Oct 24 (Saros 114)	1847 Sep 24 (Saros 115)
1858 Aug 24 (Saros 116)	1869 Jul 23 (Saros 117)	1880 Jun 22 (Saros 118)	1891 May 23 (Saros 119)	1902 Apr 22 (Saros 120)
1913 Mar 22 (Saros 121)	1924 Feb 20 (Saros 122)	1935 Jan 19 (Saros 123)	1945 Dec 19 (Saros 124)	1956 Nov 18 (Saros 125)
1967 Oct 18 (Saros 126)	1978 Sep 16 (Saros 127)	1989 Aug 17 (Saros 128)	2000 Jul 16 (Saros 129)	2011 Jun 15 (Saros 130)
2022 May 16 (Saros 131)	2033 Apr 14 (Saros 132)	2044 Mar 13 (Saros 133)	2055 Feb 11 (Saros 134)	2066 Jan 11 (Saros 135)
2076 Dec 10 (Saros 136)	2087 Nov 10 (Saros 137)	2098 Oct 10 (Saros 138)	2109 Sep 09 (Saros 139)	2120 Aug 09 (Saros 140)
2131 Jul 10 (Saros 141)	2142 Jun 08 (Saros 142)	2153 May 08 (Saros 143)	2164 Apr 07 (Saros 144)	2175 Mar 07 (Saros 145)
2186 Feb 04 (Saros 146)	2197 Jan 04 (Saros 147)			

=== Inex series ===
This eclipse is a part of the long period inex cycle, repeating at alternating nodes, every 358 synodic months (≈ 10,571.95 days, or 29 years minus 20 days). Their appearance and longitude are irregular due to a lack of synchronization with the anomalistic month (period of perigee). However, groupings of 3 inex cycles (≈ 87 years minus 2 months) comes close (≈ 1,151.02 anomalistic months), so eclipses are similar in these groupings.

Series members between 1801 and 2200
1812 Aug 22 (Saros 125)	1841 Aug 02 (Saros 126)	1870 Jul 12 (Saros 127)
1899 Jun 23 (Saros 128)	1928 Jun 03 (Saros 129)	1957 May 13 (Saros 130)
1986 Apr 24 (Saros 131)	2015 Apr 04 (Saros 132)	2044 Mar 13 (Saros 133)
2073 Feb 22 (Saros 134)	2102 Feb 03 (Saros 135)	2131 Jan 13 (Saros 136)
2159 Dec 24 (Saros 137)	2188 Dec 04 (Saros 138)	

=== Half-Saros cycle ===
A lunar eclipse will be preceded and followed by solar eclipses by 9 years and 5.5 days (a half saros). This lunar eclipse is related to two annular solar eclipses of Solar Saros 140.

March 9, 2035	March 20, 2053

== See also ==
- List of lunar eclipses and List of 21st-century lunar eclipses
