= February 1990 lunar eclipse =

Total lunar eclipse February 9, 1990

- Total eclipse
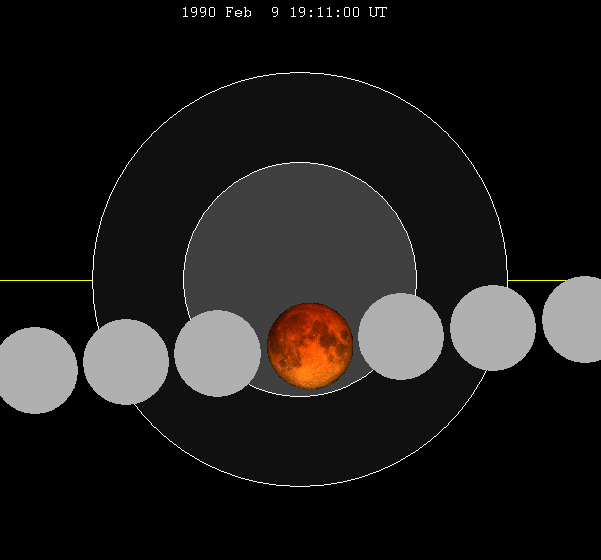
- The Moon's hourly motion shown right to left
- Date: February 9, 1990
- Gamma: −0.4148
- Magnitude: 1.0750
- Saros cycle: 133 (25 of 71)
- Totality: 42 minutes, 19 seconds
- Partiality: 204 minutes, 17 seconds
- Penumbral: 339 minutes, 35 seconds
Contacts (UTC)
- P1: 16:21:21
- U1: 17:28:55
- U2: 18:49:55
- Greatest: 19:11:06
- U3: 19:32:13
- U4: 20:53:12
- P4: 22:00:56

A total lunar eclipse occurred at the Moon’s descending node of orbit on Friday, February 9, 1990, with an umbral magnitude of 1.0750. A lunar eclipse occurs when the Moon moves into the Earth's shadow, causing the Moon to be darkened. A total lunar eclipse occurs when the Moon's near side entirely passes into the Earth's umbral shadow. Unlike a solar eclipse, which can only be viewed from a relatively small area of the world, a lunar eclipse may be viewed from anywhere on the night side of Earth. A total lunar eclipse can last up to nearly two hours, while a total solar eclipse lasts only a few minutes at any given place, because the Moon's shadow is smaller. The Moon's apparent diameter will be near the average diameter because it will occur 7.7 days after perigee (on February 2, 1990, at 2:40 UTC) and 6.75 days before apogee (on February 16, 1990, at 13:05 UTC).

== Visibility ==
The eclipse was completely visible over east Africa, eastern Europe, and Asia, seen rising over northeastern North America, eastern South America, western Europe and west and central Africa and setting over Australia, northwestern North America, and the western and central Pacific Ocean.

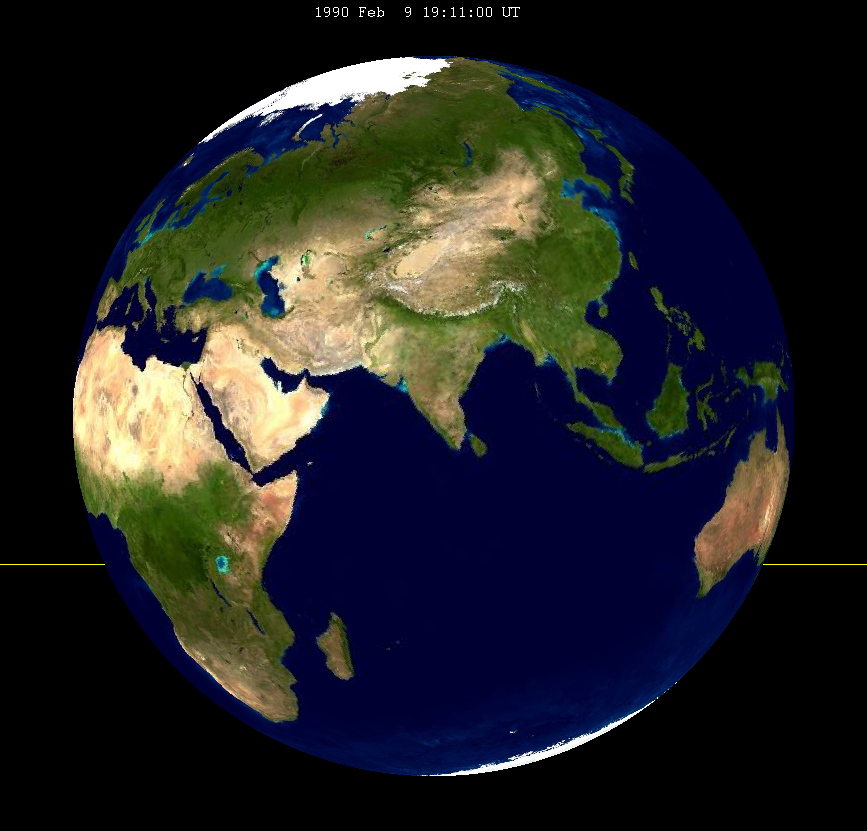
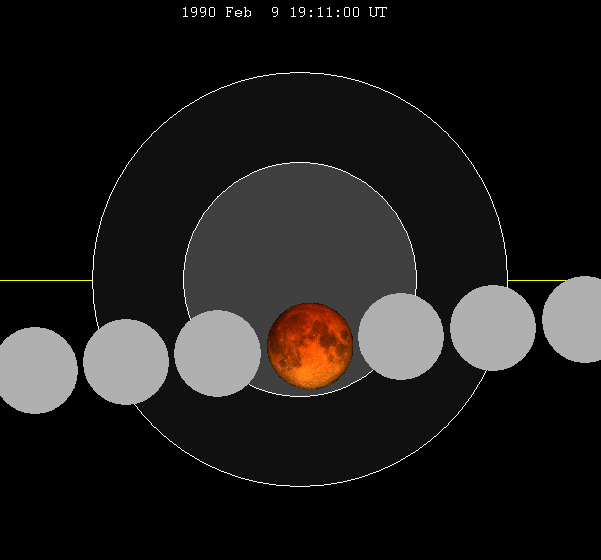

== Eclipse details ==
Shown below is a table displaying details about this particular solar eclipse. It describes various parameters pertaining to this eclipse.

February 9, 1990 Lunar Eclipse Parameters
Parameter	Value
Penumbral Magnitude	2.11912
Umbral Magnitude	1.07499
Gamma	−0.41481
Sun Right Ascension	21h32m41.8s
Sun Declination	-14°34'08.6"
Sun Semi-Diameter	16'12.6"
Sun Equatorial Horizontal Parallax	08.9"
Moon Right Ascension	09h32m01.7s
Moon Declination	+14°12'35.9"
Moon Semi-Diameter	15'31.5"
Moon Equatorial Horizontal Parallax	0°56'58.5"
ΔT	56.9 s

== Eclipse season ==
This eclipse is part of an eclipse season, a period, roughly every six months, when eclipses occur. Only two (or occasionally three) eclipse seasons occur each year, and each season lasts about 35 days and repeats just short of six months (173 days) later; thus two full eclipse seasons always occur each year. Either two or three eclipses happen each eclipse season. In the sequence below, each eclipse is separated by a fortnight.

Eclipse season of January–February 1990
January 26 Ascending node (new moon)	February 9 Descending node (full moon)
Annular solar eclipse Solar Saros 121	Total lunar eclipse Lunar Saros 133

== Related eclipses ==
=== Eclipses in 1990 ===
- An annular solar eclipse on January 26.
- A total lunar eclipse on February 9.
- A total solar eclipse on July 22.
- A partial lunar eclipse on August 6.

=== Metonic ===
- Preceded by: Lunar eclipse of April 24, 1986
- Followed by: Lunar eclipse of November 29, 1993

=== Tzolkinex ===
- Preceded by: Lunar eclipse of December 30, 1982
- Followed by: Lunar eclipse of March 24, 1997

=== Half-Saros ===
- Preceded by: Solar eclipse of February 4, 1981
- Followed by: Solar eclipse of February 16, 1999

=== Tritos ===
- Preceded by: Lunar eclipse of March 13, 1979
- Followed by: Lunar eclipse of January 9, 2001

=== Lunar Saros 133 ===
- Preceded by: Lunar eclipse of January 30, 1972
- Followed by: Lunar eclipse of February 21, 2008

=== Inex ===
- Preceded by: Lunar eclipse of March 2, 1961
- Followed by: Lunar eclipse of January 21, 2019

=== Triad ===
- Preceded by: Lunar eclipse of April 12, 1903
- Followed by: Lunar eclipse of December 10, 2076

=== Lunar eclipses of 1988–1991 ===
This eclipse is a member of a semester series. An eclipse in a semester series of lunar eclipses repeats approximately every 177 days and 4 hours (a semester) at alternating nodes of the Moon's orbit.

The lunar eclipses on June 27, 1991 (penumbral) and December 21, 1991 (partial) occur in the next lunar year eclipse set.

Lunar eclipse series sets from 1988 to 1991
Descending node				Ascending node			
Saros	Date Viewing	Type Chart	Gamma	Saros	Date Viewing	Type Chart	Gamma
113	1988 Mar 03	Penumbral	0.9886	118	1988 Aug 27	Partial	−0.8682
123	1989 Feb 20	Total	0.2935	128	1989 Aug 17	Total	−0.1491
133	1990 Feb 09	Total	−0.4148	138	1990 Aug 06	Partial	0.6374
143	1991 Jan 30	Penumbral	−1.0752	148	1991 Jul 26	Penumbral	1.4370

=== Saros 133 ===
This eclipse is a part of Saros series 133, repeating every 18 years, 11 days, and containing 71 events. The series started with a penumbral lunar eclipse on May 13, 1557. It contains partial eclipses from August 7, 1683 through December 17, 1899; total eclipses from December 28, 1917 through August 3, 2278; and a second set of partial eclipses from August 14, 2296 through March 11, 2639. The series ends at member 71 as a penumbral eclipse on June 29, 2819.

The longest duration of totality will be produced by member 35 at 101 minutes, 41 seconds on May 30, 2170. All eclipses in this series occur at the Moon’s descending node of orbit.

Greatest	First			
The greatest eclipse of the series will occur on 2170 May 30, lasting 101 minutes, 41 seconds.	Penumbral	Partial	Total	Central
The greatest eclipse of the series will occur on 2170 May 30, lasting 101 minutes, 41 seconds.	1557 May 13	1683 Aug 07	1917 Dec 28	2098 Apr 15
The greatest eclipse of the series will occur on 2170 May 30, lasting 101 minutes, 41 seconds.	Last			
The greatest eclipse of the series will occur on 2170 May 30, lasting 101 minutes, 41 seconds.	Central	Total	Partial	Penumbral
The greatest eclipse of the series will occur on 2170 May 30, lasting 101 minutes, 41 seconds.	2224 Jul 01	2278 Aug 03	2639 Mar 11	2819 Jun 29

Eclipses are tabulated in three columns; every third eclipse in the same column is one exeligmos apart, so they all cast shadows over approximately the same parts of the Earth.

Series members 15–36 occur between 1801 and 2200:
15	16	17
1809 Oct 23	1827 Nov 03	1845 Nov 14
18	19	20
1863 Nov 25	1881 Dec 05	1899 Dec 17
21	22	23
1917 Dec 28	1936 Jan 08	1954 Jan 19
24	25	26
1972 Jan 30	1990 Feb 09	2008 Feb 21
27	28	29
2026 Mar 03	2044 Mar 13	2062 Mar 25
30	31	32
2080 Apr 04	2098 Apr 15	2116 Apr 27
33	34	35
2134 May 08	2152 May 18	2170 May 30
36
2188 Jun 09

=== Tritos series ===
This eclipse is a part of a tritos cycle, repeating at alternating nodes every 135 synodic months (≈ 3986.63 days, or 11 years minus 1 month). Their appearance and longitude are irregular due to a lack of synchronization with the anomalistic month (period of perigee), but groupings of 3 tritos cycles (≈ 33 years minus 3 months) come close (≈ 434.044 anomalistic months), so eclipses are similar in these groupings.

Series members between 1801 and 2200
1804 Jul 22 (Saros 116)	1815 Jun 21 (Saros 117)	1826 May 21 (Saros 118)	1837 Apr 20 (Saros 119)	1848 Mar 19 (Saros 120)
1859 Feb 17 (Saros 121)	1870 Jan 17 (Saros 122)	1880 Dec 16 (Saros 123)	1891 Nov 16 (Saros 124)	1902 Oct 17 (Saros 125)
1913 Sep 15 (Saros 126)	1924 Aug 14 (Saros 127)	1935 Jul 16 (Saros 128)	1946 Jun 14 (Saros 129)	1957 May 13 (Saros 130)
1968 Apr 13 (Saros 131)	1979 Mar 13 (Saros 132)	1990 Feb 09 (Saros 133)	2001 Jan 09 (Saros 134)	2011 Dec 10 (Saros 135)
2022 Nov 08 (Saros 136)	2033 Oct 08 (Saros 137)	2044 Sep 07 (Saros 138)	2055 Aug 07 (Saros 139)	2066 Jul 07 (Saros 140)
2077 Jun 06 (Saros 141)	2088 May 05 (Saros 142)	2099 Apr 05 (Saros 143)	2110 Mar 06 (Saros 144)	2121 Feb 02 (Saros 145)
2132 Jan 02 (Saros 146)	2142 Dec 03 (Saros 147)	2153 Nov 01 (Saros 148)	2164 Sep 30 (Saros 149)	2175 Aug 31 (Saros 150)
2186 Jul 31 (Saros 151)	2197 Jun 29 (Saros 152)			

=== Inex series ===
This eclipse is a part of the long period inex cycle, repeating at alternating nodes, every 358 synodic months (≈ 10,571.95 days, or 29 years minus 20 days). Their appearance and longitude are irregular due to a lack of synchronization with the anomalistic month (period of perigee). However, groupings of 3 inex cycles (≈ 87 years minus 2 months) comes close (≈ 1,151.02 anomalistic months), so eclipses are similar in these groupings.

Series members between 1801 and 2200
1816 Jun 10 (Saros 127)	1845 May 21 (Saros 128)	1874 May 01 (Saros 129)
1903 Apr 12 (Saros 130)	1932 Mar 22 (Saros 131)	1961 Mar 02 (Saros 132)
1990 Feb 09 (Saros 133)	2019 Jan 21 (Saros 134)	2048 Jan 01 (Saros 135)
2076 Dec 10 (Saros 136)	2105 Nov 21 (Saros 137)	2134 Nov 02 (Saros 138)
2163 Oct 12 (Saros 139)	2192 Sep 21 (Saros 140)	

=== Half-Saros cycle ===
A lunar eclipse will be preceded and followed by solar eclipses by 9 years and 5.5 days (a half saros). This lunar eclipse is related to two annular solar eclipses of Solar Saros 140.

February 4, 1981	February 16, 1999

== See also ==
- List of lunar eclipses
- List of 20th-century lunar eclipses
