= Lunar Saros 133 =

Eclipse cycle of the moon

Member 26	Member 27
2008 Feb 21	2026 Mar 03

Saros cycle series 133 for lunar eclipses occurs at the moon's descending node, repeats every 18 years 11 and 1/3 days. It contains 71 events.

This lunar saros is linked to Solar Saros 140.

== List ==
Cat.	Saros	Mem	Date	Time UT (hr:mn)	Type	Gamma	Magnitude	Duration (min)			Contacts UT (hr:mn)						Chart
Cat.	Saros	Mem	Date	Greatest	Type	Gamma	Magnitude	Pen.	Par.	Tot.	P1	P4	U1	U2	U3	U4	Chart
08563	133	1	1557 May 13	9:23:04	Penumbral	-1.5370	-0.9975	83.9			8:41:07	10:05:01					
08606	133	2	1575 May 24	15:51:37	Penumbral	-1.4542	-0.8444	144.3			14:39:28	17:03:46					
08649	133	3	1593 Jun 13	22:19:51	Penumbral	-1.3703	-0.6895	184.3			20:47:42	23:52:00					
08693	133	4	1611 Jun 25	4:45:08	Penumbral	-1.2836	-0.5295	216.0			2:57:08	6:33:08					
08737	133	5	1629 Jul 05	11:11:37	Penumbral	-1.1969	-0.3696	241.7			9:10:46	13:12:28					
08781	133	6	1647 Jul 16	17:39:13	Penumbral	-1.1100	-0.2097	263.3			15:27:34	19:50:52					
08826	133	7	1665 Jul 27	0:11:35	Penumbral	-1.0260	-0.0554	281.0			21:51:05	2:32:05					
08872	133	8	1683 Aug 07	6:48:53	Partial	-0.9452	0.0931	295.7	73.7		4:21:02	9:16:44	6:12:02			7:25:44	
08918	133	9	1701 Aug 18	13:32:17	Partial	-0.8683	0.2342	307.8	114.3		10:58:23	16:06:11	12:35:08			14:29:26	
08964	133	10	1719 Aug 29	20:24:03	Partial	-0.7974	0.3641	317.5	139.5		17:45:18	23:02:48	19:14:18			21:33:48	
09011	133	11	1737 Sep 09	3:24:12	Partial	-0.7325	0.4830	325.3	157.4		0:41:33	6:06:51	2:05:30			4:42:54	
09058	133	12	1755 Sep 20	10:34:08	Partial	-0.6745	0.5890	331.3	170.5		7:48:29	13:19:47	9:08:53			11:59:23	
09104	133	13	1773 Sep 30	17:53:06	Partial	-0.6232	0.6829	336.0	180.3		15:05:06	20:41:06	16:22:57			19:23:15	
09149	133	14	1791 Oct 12	1:23:20	Partial	-0.5802	0.7615	339.4	187.4		22:33:38	4:13:02	23:49:38			2:57:02	
09194	133	15	1809 Oct 23	9:02:46	Partial	-0.5440	0.8275	341.8	192.6		6:11:52	11:53:40	7:26:28			10:39:04	
09239	133	16	1827 Nov 03	16:51:55	Partial	-0.5151	0.8805	343.3	196.3		14:00:16	19:43:34	15:13:46			18:30:04	
09286	133	17	1845 Nov 14	0:49:42	Partial	-0.4924	0.9221	344.1	198.9		21:57:39	3:41:45	23:10:15			2:29:09	
09331	133	18	1863 Nov 25	8:56:11	Partial	-0.4760	0.9525	344.4	200.4		6:03:59	11:48:23	7:15:59			10:36:23	
09375	133	19	1881 Dec 05	17:08:33	Partial	-0.4640	0.9751	344.2	201.4		14:16:27	20:00:39	15:27:51			18:49:15	
09419	133	20	1899 Dec 17	1:25:45	Partial	-0.4551	0.9922	343.7	202.0		22:33:54	4:17:36	23:44:45			3:06:45	
09461	133	21	1917 Dec 28	9:46:32	Total	-0.4484	1.0056	343.0	202.3	12.0	6:55:02	12:38:02	8:05:23	9:40:32	9:52:32	11:27:41	
09503	133	22	1936 Jan 08	18:09:58	Total	-0.4428	1.0173	342.1	202.5	20.8	15:18:55	21:01:01	16:28:43	17:59:34	18:20:22	19:51:13	
09544	133	23	1954 Jan 19	2:32:21	Total	-0.4357	1.0322	341.2	202.9	28.2	23:41:45	5:22:57	0:50:54	2:18:15	2:46:27	4:13:48	
09585	133	24	1972 Jan 30	10:54:05	Total	-0.4273	1.0497	340.3	203.4	34.8	8:03:56	13:44:14	9:12:23	10:36:41	11:11:29	12:35:47	
09626	133	25	1990 Feb 09	19:12:02	Total	-0.4148	1.0750	339.6	204.3	42.3	16:22:14	22:01:50	17:29:53	18:50:53	19:33:11	20:54:11	
09667	133	26	2008 Feb 21	3:27:09	Total	-0.3992	1.1062	339.0	205.4	49.8	0:37:39	6:16:39	1:44:27	3:02:15	3:52:03	5:09:51	
09708	133	27	2026 Mar 03	11:34:52	Total	-0.3765	1.1507	338.6	207.2	58.3	8:45:34	14:24:10	9:51:16	11:05:43	12:04:01	13:18:28	
09749	133	28	2044 Mar 13	19:38:33	Total	-0.3496	1.2031	338.4	209.1	66.4	16:49:21	22:27:45	17:54:00	19:05:21	20:11:45	21:23:06	
09790	133	29	2062 Mar 25	3:33:50	Total	-0.3150	1.2695	338.3	211.3	74.7	0:44:41	6:22:59	1:48:11	2:56:29	4:11:11	5:19:29	
09831	133	30	2080 Apr 04	11:23:38	Total	-0.2751	1.3460	338.3	213.6	82.1	8:34:29	14:12:47	9:36:50	10:42:35	12:04:41	13:10:26	
09873	133	31	2098 Apr 15	19:04:48	Total	-0.2272	1.4369	338.3	215.8	89.0	16:15:39	21:53:57	17:16:54	18:20:18	19:49:18	20:52:42	
09915	133	32	2116 Apr 27	2:41:18	Total	-0.1746	1.5364	338.1	217.7	94.6	23:52:15	5:30:21	0:52:27	1:54:00	3:28:36	4:30:09	
09957	133	33	2134 May 08	10:10:41	Total	-0.1152	1.6482	337.6	219.0	98.8	7:21:53	12:59:29	8:21:11	9:21:17	11:00:05	12:00:11	
10001	133	34	2152 May 18	17:35:13	Total	-0.0511	1.7688	336.7	219.6	101.2	14:46:52	20:23:34	15:45:25	16:44:37	18:25:49	19:25:01	
10044	133	35	2170 May 30	0:55:17	Total	0.0174	1.8330	335.3	219.3	101.7	22:07:38	3:42:56	23:05:38	0:04:26	1:46:08	2:44:56	
10087	133	36	2188 Jun 09	8:12:51	Total	0.0887	1.7045	333.2	218.0	99.8	5:26:15	10:59:27	6:23:51	7:22:57	9:02:45	10:01:51	
10130	133	37	2206 Jun 21	15:28:26	Total	0.1626	1.5711	330.5	215.5	95.4	12:43:11	18:13:41	13:40:41	14:40:44	16:16:08	17:16:11	
10174	133	38	2224 Jul 01	22:43:13	Total	0.2378	1.4348	327.0	211.7	87.7	19:59:43	1:26:43	20:57:22	21:59:22	23:27:04	0:29:04	
10219	133	39	2242 Jul 13	5:59:11	Total	0.3129	1.2985	322.9	206.7	76.2	3:17:44	8:40:38	4:15:50	5:21:05	6:37:17	7:42:32	
10265	133	40	2260 Jul 23	13:17:09	Total	0.3867	1.1642	318.1	200.5	59.0	10:38:06	15:56:12	11:36:54	12:47:39	13:46:39	14:57:24	
10311	133	41	2278 Aug 03	20:37:40	Total	0.4592	1.0322	312.7	193.0	27.1	18:01:19	23:14:01	19:01:10	20:24:07	20:51:13	22:14:10	
10358	133	42	2296 Aug 14	4:03:01	Partial	0.5282	0.9060	306.8	184.5		1:29:37	6:36:25	2:30:46			5:35:16	
10404	133	43	2314 Aug 26	11:33:39	Partial	0.5935	0.7866	300.7	175.1		9:03:18	14:04:00	10:06:06			13:01:12	
10450	133	44	2332 Sep 05	19:11:20	Partial	0.6533	0.6771	294.4	165.0		16:44:08	21:38:32	17:48:50			20:33:50	
10496	133	45	2350 Sep 17	2:54:54	Partial	0.7087	0.5752	288.1	154.3		0:30:51	5:18:57	1:37:45			4:12:03	
10541	133	46	2368 Sep 27	10:47:20	Partial	0.7571	0.4862	282.1	143.5		8:26:17	13:08:23	9:35:35			11:59:05	
10585	133	47	2386 Oct 08	18:46:46	Partial	0.8002	0.4066	276.4	132.5		16:28:34	21:04:58	17:40:31			19:53:01	
10630	133	48	2404 Oct 19	2:55:17	Partial	0.8362	0.3400	271.4	122.2		0:39:35	5:10:59	1:54:11			3:56:23	
10674	133	49	2422 Oct 30	11:10:45	Partial	0.8668	0.2831	266.9	112.2		8:57:18	13:24:12	10:14:39			12:06:51	
10718	133	50	2440 Nov 09	19:35:18	Partial	0.8904	0.2392	263.2	103.7		17:23:42	21:46:54	18:43:27			20:27:09	
10762	133	51	2458 Nov 21	4:06:22	Partial	0.9091	0.2043	260.2	96.1		1:56:16	6:16:28	3:18:19			4:54:25	
10804	133	52	2476 Dec 01	12:44:17	Partial	0.9228	0.1789	257.9	90.2		10:35:20	14:53:14	11:59:11			13:29:23	
10846	133	53	2494 Dec 12	21:27:43	Partial	0.9324	0.1610	256.2	85.7		19:19:37	23:35:49	20:44:52			22:10:34	
10887	133	54	2512 Dec 24	6:15:46	Partial	0.9388	0.1490	255.0	82.5		4:08:16	8:23:16	5:34:31			6:57:01	
10927	133	55	2531 Jan 04	15:06:28	Partial	0.9433	0.1407	254.1	80.2		12:59:25	17:13:31	14:26:22			15:46:34	
10968	133	56	2549 Jan 14	23:58:01	Partial	0.9477	0.1330	253.2	78.0		21:51:25	2:04:37	23:19:01			0:37:01	
11010	133	57	2567 Jan 26	8:49:56	Partial	0.9521	0.1254	252.3	75.8		6:43:47	10:56:05	8:12:02			9:27:50	
11050	133	58	2585 Feb 05	17:40:16	Partial	0.9585	0.1143	251.0	72.4		15:34:46	19:45:46	17:04:04			18:16:28	
11090	133	59	2603 Feb 18	2:26:58	Partial	0.9679	0.0978	249.3	67.1		0:22:19	4:31:37	1:53:25			3:00:31	
11130	133	60	2621 Feb 28	11:09:03	Partial	0.9813	0.0741	246.8	58.6		9:05:39	13:12:27	10:39:45			11:38:21	
11171	133	61	2639 Mar 11	19:45:23	Partial	0.9996	0.0417	243.5	44.2		17:43:38	21:47:08	19:23:17			20:07:29	
11212	133	62	2657 Mar 22	4:15:37	Penumbral	1.0230	-0.0001	239.1			2:16:04	6:15:10					
11254	133	63	2675 Apr 02	12:37:33	Penumbral	1.0534	-0.0546	233.3			10:40:54	14:34:12					
11297	133	64	2693 Apr 12	20:52:52	Penumbral	1.0893	-0.1193	226.0			18:59:52	22:45:52					
11340	133	65	2711 Apr 25	4:59:49	Penumbral	1.1317	-0.1961	216.9			3:11:22	6:48:16					
11382	133	66	2729 May 5	12:59:44	Penumbral	1.1800	-0.2837	205.6			11:16:56	14:42:32					
11424	133	67	2747 May 16	20:51:32	Penumbral	1.2348	-0.3835	191.4			19:15:50	22:27:14					
11468	133	68	2765 May 27	4:37:27	Penumbral	1.2942	-0.4918	173.9			3:10:30	6:04:24					
11512	133	69	2783 Jun 07	12:17:27	Penumbral	1.3582	-0.6090	151.8			11:01:33	13:33:21					
11558	133	70	2801 Jun 17	19:51:48	Penumbral	1.4265	-0.7343	122.1			18:50:45	20:52:51					
11605	133	71	2819 Jun 29	3:22:47	Penumbral	1.4969	-0.8637	78.2			2:43:41	4:01:53					

== See also ==
- List of lunar eclipses
  - List of Saros series for lunar eclipses
