= February 1943 lunar eclipse =

Partial lunar eclipse February 20, 1943

- Partial eclipse
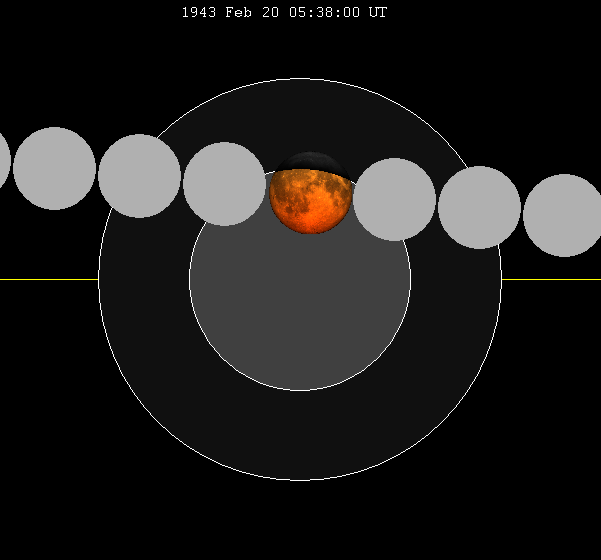
- The Moon's hourly motion shown right to left
- Date: February 20, 1943
- Gamma: 0.5752
- Magnitude: 0.7616
- Saros cycle: 132 (26 of 71)
- Partiality: 189 minutes, 1 second
- Penumbral: 345 minutes, 8 seconds
Contacts (UTC)
- P1: 2:45:21
- U1: 4:03:28
- Greatest: 5:37:57
- U4: 7:12:29
- P4: 8:30:29

A partial lunar eclipse occurred at the Moon's ascending node of orbit on Saturday, February 20, 1943, with an umbral magnitude of 0.7616. A lunar eclipse occurs when the Moon moves into the Earth's shadow, causing the Moon to be darkened. A partial lunar eclipse occurs when one part of the Moon is in the Earth's umbra, while the other part is in the Earth's penumbra. Unlike a solar eclipse, which can only be viewed from a relatively small area of the world, a lunar eclipse may be viewed from anywhere on the night side of Earth. Occurring about 3.8 days after apogee (on February 16, 1943, at 9:00 UTC), the Moon's apparent diameter was smaller.

== Visibility ==
The eclipse was completely visible over North and South America, seen rising over northeast Asia and the central Pacific Ocean and setting over Africa, Europe, and the Middle East.

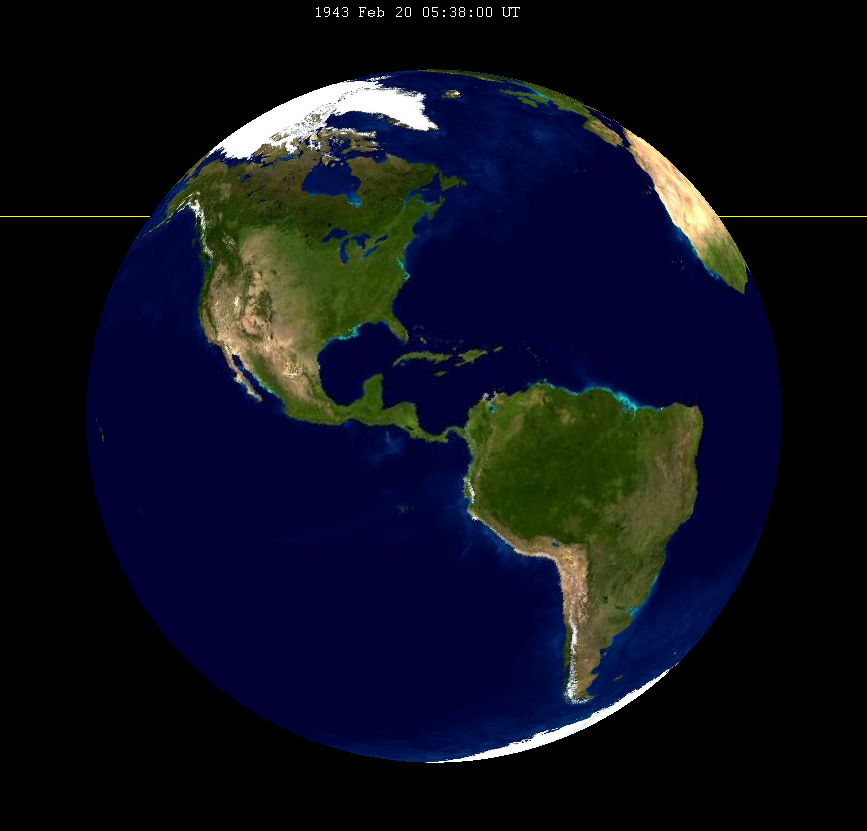
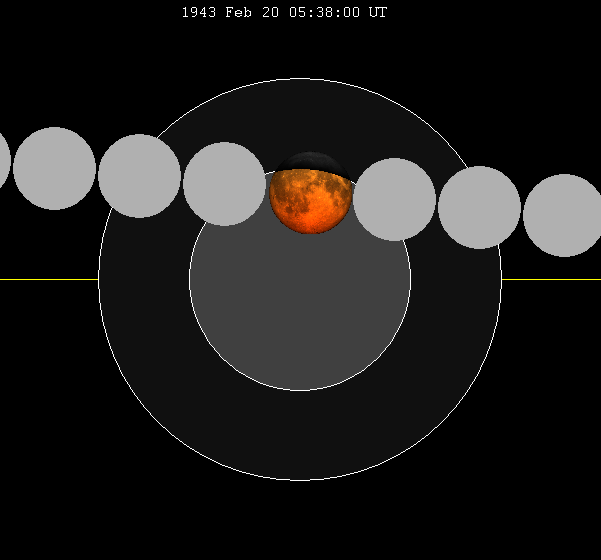

== Eclipse details ==
Shown below is a table displaying details about this particular solar eclipse. It describes various parameters pertaining to this eclipse.

February 20, 1943 Lunar Eclipse Parameters
| Parameter | Value |
|---|---|
| Penumbral Magnitude | 1.84442 |
| Umbral Magnitude | 0.76156 |
| Gamma | 0.57517 |
| Sun Right Ascension | 22h11m04.8s |
| Sun Declination | -11°13'23.9" |
| Sun Semi-Diameter | 16'10.5" |
| Sun Equatorial Horizontal Parallax | 08.9" |
| Moon Right Ascension | 10h11m38.1s |
| Moon Declination | +11°43'51.2" |
| Moon Semi-Diameter | 14'56.3" |
| Moon Equatorial Horizontal Parallax | 0°54'49.3" |
| ΔT | 25.9 s |

== Eclipse season ==
This eclipse is part of an eclipse season, a period, roughly every six months, when eclipses occur. Only two (or occasionally three) eclipse seasons occur each year, and each season lasts about 35 days and repeats just short of six months (173 days) later; thus two full eclipse seasons always occur each year. Either two or three eclipses happen each eclipse season. In the sequence below, each eclipse is separated by a fortnight.

Eclipse season of February 1943
| February 4 Descending node (new moon) | February 20 Ascending node (full moon) |
|---|---|
| Total solar eclipse Solar Saros 120 | Partial lunar eclipse Lunar Saros 132 |

== Related eclipses ==
=== Eclipses in 1943 ===
- A total solar eclipse on February 4.
- A partial lunar eclipse on February 20.
- An annular solar eclipse on August 1.
- A partial lunar eclipse on August 15.

=== Metonic ===
- Preceded by: Lunar eclipse of May 3, 1939
- Followed by: Lunar eclipse of December 8, 1946

=== Tzolkinex ===
- Preceded by: Lunar eclipse of January 8, 1936
- Followed by: Lunar eclipse of April 2, 1950

=== Half-Saros ===
- Preceded by: Solar eclipse of February 14, 1934
- Followed by: Solar eclipse of February 25, 1952

=== Tritos ===
- Preceded by: Lunar eclipse of March 22, 1932
- Followed by: Lunar eclipse of January 19, 1954

=== Lunar Saros 132 ===
- Preceded by: Lunar eclipse of February 8, 1925
- Followed by: Lunar eclipse of March 2, 1961

=== Inex ===
- Preceded by: Lunar eclipse of March 12, 1914
- Followed by: Lunar eclipse of January 30, 1972

=== Triad ===
- Preceded by: Lunar eclipse of April 20, 1856
- Followed by: Lunar eclipse of December 20, 2029

=== Lunar eclipses of 1940–1944 ===
This eclipse is a member of a semester series. An eclipse in a semester series of lunar eclipses repeats approximately every 177 days and 4 hours (a semester) at alternating nodes of the Moon's orbit.

The penumbral lunar eclipses on April 22, 1940 and October 16, 1940 occur in the previous lunar year eclipse set, and the penumbral lunar eclipses on July 6, 1944 and December 29, 1944 occur in the next lunar year eclipse set.

Lunar eclipse series sets from 1940 to 1944
| Ascending node | | | | Descending node | | | |
| Saros | Date Viewing | Type Chart | Gamma | Saros | Date Viewing | Type Chart | Gamma |
| 102 | 1940 Mar 23 | Penumbral | −1.5034 | 107 | | | |
| 112 | 1941 Mar 13 | Partial | −0.8437 | 117 | 1941 Sep 05 | Partial | 0.9747 |
| 122 | 1942 Mar 03 | Total | −0.1545 | 127 | 1942 Aug 26 | Total | 0.1818 |
| 132 | 1943 Feb 20 | Partial | 0.5752 | 137 | 1943 Aug 15 | Partial | −0.5534 |
| 142 | 1944 Feb 09 | Penumbral | 1.2698 | 147 | 1944 Aug 04 | Penumbral | −1.2843 |

=== Saros 132 ===
This eclipse is a part of Saros series 132, repeating every 18 years, 11 days, and containing 71 events. The series started with a penumbral lunar eclipse on May 12, 1492. It contains partial eclipses from August 16, 1636 through March 24, 1997; total eclipses from April 4, 2015 through August 2, 2213; and a second set of partial eclipses from August 13, 2231 through November 30, 2411. The series ends at member 71 as a penumbral eclipse on June 26, 2754.

The longest duration of totality will be produced by member 36 at 106 minutes, 6 seconds on June 9, 2123. All eclipses in this series occur at the Moon’s ascending node of orbit.

| Greatest | First | | | |
|---|---|---|---|---|
| The greatest eclipse of the series will occur on 2123 Jun 09, lasting 106 minutes, 6 seconds. | Penumbral | Partial | Total | Central |
| The greatest eclipse of the series will occur on 2123 Jun 09, lasting 106 minutes, 6 seconds. | 1492 May 12 | 1636 Aug 16 | 2015 Apr 04 | 2069 May 06 |
| The greatest eclipse of the series will occur on 2123 Jun 09, lasting 106 minutes, 6 seconds. | Last | | | |
| The greatest eclipse of the series will occur on 2123 Jun 09, lasting 106 minutes, 6 seconds. | Central | Total | Partial | Penumbral |
| The greatest eclipse of the series will occur on 2123 Jun 09, lasting 106 minutes, 6 seconds. | 2177 Jul 11 | 2213 Aug 02 | 2411 Nov 30 | 2754 Jun 26 |

Eclipses are tabulated in three columns; every third eclipse in the same column is one exeligmos apart, so they all cast shadows over approximately the same parts of the Earth.

Series members 19–40 occur between 1801 and 2200:
| 19 | 20 | 21 |
|---|---|---|
| 1816 Dec 04 | 1834 Dec 16 | 1852 Dec 26 |
| 22 | 23 | 24 |
| 1871 Jan 06 | 1889 Jan 17 | 1907 Jan 29 |
| 25 | 26 | 27 |
| 1925 Feb 08 | 1943 Feb 20 | 1961 Mar 02 |
| 28 | 29 | 30 |
| 1979 Mar 13 | 1997 Mar 24 | 2015 Apr 04 |
| 31 | 32 | 33 |
| 2033 Apr 14 | 2051 Apr 26 | 2069 May 06 |
| 34 | 35 | 36 |
| 2087 May 17 | 2105 May 28 | 2123 Jun 09 |
| 37 | 38 | 39 |
| 2141 Jun 19 | 2159 Jun 30 | 2177 Jul 11 |
40
2195 Jul 22

=== Tritos series ===
This eclipse is a part of a tritos cycle, repeating at alternating nodes every 135 synodic months (≈ 3986.63 days, or 11 years minus 1 month). Their appearance and longitude are irregular due to a lack of synchronization with the anomalistic month (period of perigee), but groupings of 3 tritos cycles (≈ 33 years minus 3 months) come close (≈ 434.044 anomalistic months), so eclipses are similar in these groupings.

Series members between 1801 and 2200
| 1801 Mar 30 (Saros 119) | 1812 Feb 27 (Saros 120) | 1823 Jan 26 (Saros 121) | 1833 Dec 26 (Saros 122) | 1844 Nov 24 (Saros 123) |
| 1855 Oct 25 (Saros 124) | 1866 Sep 24 (Saros 125) | 1877 Aug 23 (Saros 126) | 1888 Jul 23 (Saros 127) | 1899 Jun 23 (Saros 128) |
| 1910 May 24 (Saros 129) | 1921 Apr 22 (Saros 130) | 1932 Mar 22 (Saros 131) | 1943 Feb 20 (Saros 132) | 1954 Jan 19 (Saros 133) |
| 1964 Dec 19 (Saros 134) | 1975 Nov 18 (Saros 135) | 1986 Oct 17 (Saros 136) | 1997 Sep 16 (Saros 137) | 2008 Aug 16 (Saros 138) |
| 2019 Jul 16 (Saros 139) | 2030 Jun 15 (Saros 140) | 2041 May 16 (Saros 141) | 2052 Apr 14 (Saros 142) | 2063 Mar 14 (Saros 143) |
| 2074 Feb 11 (Saros 144) | 2085 Jan 10 (Saros 145) | 2095 Dec 11 (Saros 146) | 2106 Nov 11 (Saros 147) | 2117 Oct 10 (Saros 148) |
| 2128 Sep 09 (Saros 149) | 2139 Aug 10 (Saros 150) | 2150 Jul 09 (Saros 151) | 2161 Jun 08 (Saros 152) | 2172 May 08 (Saros 153) |
| | 2194 Mar 07 (Saros 155) | | | |

=== Inex series ===
This eclipse is a part of the long period inex cycle, repeating at alternating nodes, every 358 synodic months (≈ 10,571.95 days, or 29 years minus 20 days). Their appearance and longitude are irregular due to a lack of synchronization with the anomalistic month (period of perigee). However, groupings of 3 inex cycles (≈ 87 years minus 2 months) comes close (≈ 1,151.02 anomalistic months), so eclipses are similar in these groupings.

Series members between 1801 and 2200
| 1827 May 11 (Saros 128) | 1856 Apr 20 (Saros 129) | 1885 Mar 30 (Saros 130) |
| 1914 Mar 12 (Saros 131) | 1943 Feb 20 (Saros 132) | 1972 Jan 30 (Saros 133) |
| 2001 Jan 09 (Saros 134) | 2029 Dec 20 (Saros 135) | 2058 Nov 30 (Saros 136) |
| 2087 Nov 10 (Saros 137) | 2116 Oct 21 (Saros 138) | 2145 Sep 30 (Saros 139) |
2174 Sep 11 (Saros 140)

=== Half-Saros cycle ===
A lunar eclipse will be preceded and followed by solar eclipses by 9 years and 5.5 days (a half saros). This lunar eclipse is related to two total solar eclipses of Solar Saros 139.

| February 14, 1934 | February 25, 1952 |

== See also ==
- List of lunar eclipses and List of 21st-century lunar eclipses
