= Solar eclipse of March 20, 2053 =

Future annular solar eclipse

- Annular eclipse
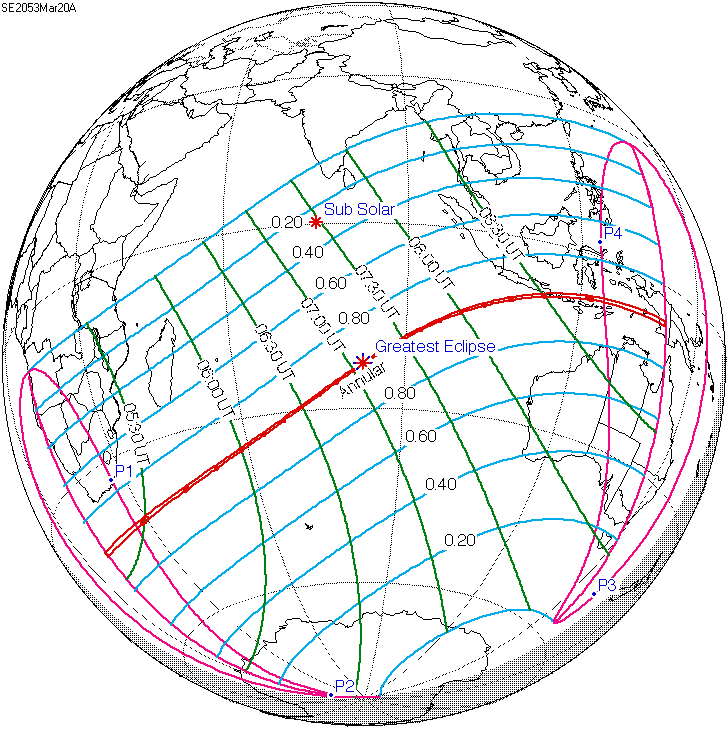
- Map
- Gamma: −0.4089
- Magnitude: 0.9919

Maximum eclipse
- Duration: 50 s (0 min 50 s)
- Coordinates: 23°S 83°E
- Max. width of band: 31 km (19 mi)

Times (UTC)
- Greatest eclipse: 7:08:19

References
- Saros: 140 (31 of 71)
- Catalog # (SE5000): 9625

An annular solar eclipse will occur at the Moon's descending node of orbit on Thursday, March 20, 2053, with a magnitude of 0.9919. A solar eclipse occurs when the Moon passes between Earth and the Sun, thereby totally or partly obscuring the image of the Sun for a viewer on Earth. An annular solar eclipse occurs when the Moon's apparent diameter is smaller than the Sun's, blocking most of the Sun's light and causing the Sun to look like an annulus (ring). An annular eclipse appears as a partial eclipse over a region of the Earth thousands of kilometres wide. Occurring about 5.6 days before perigee (on March 25, 2053, at 21:15 UTC), the Moon's apparent diameter will be larger.

The path of annularity will be visible from parts of southern Indonesia. A partial solar eclipse will also be visible for parts of Southern Africa, Southeast Asia, Australia, and Antarctica.

== Eclipse details ==
Shown below are two tables displaying details about this particular solar eclipse. The first table outlines times at which the Moon's penumbra or umbra attains the specific parameter, and the second table describes various other parameters pertaining to this eclipse.

March 20, 2053 Solar Eclipse Times
Event	Time (UTC)
First Penumbral External Contact	2053 March 20 at 04:23:06.2 UTC
First Umbral External Contact	2053 March 20 at 05:26:59.8 UTC
First Central Line	2053 March 20 at 05:27:48.3 UTC
Greatest Duration	2053 March 20 at 05:27:48.3 UTC
First Umbral Internal Contact	2053 March 20 at 05:28:36.8 UTC
First Penumbral Internal Contact	2053 March 20 at 06:49:15.3 UTC
Equatorial Conjunction	2053 March 20 at 06:53:52.2 UTC
Greatest Eclipse	2053 March 20 at 07:08:19.4 UTC
Ecliptic Conjunction	2053 March 20 at 07:12:48.2 UTC
Last Penumbral Internal Contact	2053 March 20 at 07:27:48.7 UTC
Last Umbral Internal Contact	2053 March 20 at 08:48:15.0 UTC
Last Central Line	2053 March 20 at 08:49:00.5 UTC
Last Umbral External Contact	2053 March 20 at 08:49:45.8 UTC
Last Penumbral External Contact	2053 March 20 at 09:53:32.9 UTC

March 20, 2053 Solar Eclipse Parameters
Parameter	Value
Eclipse Magnitude	0.99189
Eclipse Obscuration	0.98385
Gamma	−0.40894
Sun Right Ascension	00h00m30.3s
Sun Declination	+00°03'17.2"
Sun Semi-Diameter	16'03.6"
Sun Equatorial Horizontal Parallax	08.8"
Moon Right Ascension	00h00m59.0s
Moon Declination	-00°19'05.6"
Moon Semi-Diameter	15'41.9"
Moon Equatorial Horizontal Parallax	0°57'37.0"
ΔT	86.0 s

== Eclipse season ==
This eclipse is part of an eclipse season, a period, roughly every six months, when eclipses occur. Only two (or occasionally three) eclipse seasons occur each year, and each season lasts about 35 days and repeats just short of six months (173 days) later; thus two full eclipse seasons always occur each year. Either two or three eclipses happen each eclipse season. In the sequence below, each eclipse is separated by a fortnight.

Eclipse season of March 2053
March 4 Ascending node (full moon)	March 20 Descending node (new moon)
Penumbral lunar eclipse Lunar Saros 114	Annular solar eclipse Solar Saros 140

== Related eclipses ==
=== Eclipses in 2053 ===
- A penumbral lunar eclipse on March 4.
- An annular solar eclipse on March 20.
- A penumbral lunar eclipse on August 29.
- A total solar eclipse on September 12.

=== Metonic ===
- Preceded by: Solar eclipse of May 31, 2049
- Followed by: Solar eclipse of January 5, 2057

=== Tzolkinex ===
- Preceded by: Solar eclipse of February 5, 2046
- Followed by: Solar eclipse of April 30, 2060

=== Half-Saros ===
- Preceded by: Lunar eclipse of March 13, 2044
- Followed by: Lunar eclipse of March 25, 2062

=== Tritos ===
- Preceded by: Solar eclipse of April 20, 2042
- Followed by: Solar eclipse of February 17, 2064

=== Solar Saros 140 ===
- Preceded by: Solar eclipse of March 9, 2035
- Followed by: Solar eclipse of March 31, 2071

=== Inex ===
- Preceded by: Solar eclipse of April 8, 2024
- Followed by: Solar eclipse of February 27, 2082

=== Triad ===
- Preceded by: Solar eclipse of May 20, 1966
- Followed by: Solar eclipse of January 20, 2140

=== Solar eclipses of 2051–2054 ===
This eclipse is a member of a semester series. An eclipse in a semester series of solar eclipses repeats approximately every 177 days and 4 hours (a semester) at alternating nodes of the Moon's orbit.

The partial solar eclipse on August 3, 2054 occurs in the next lunar year eclipse set.

Solar eclipse series sets from 2051 to 2054
Descending node			Ascending node		
Saros	Map	Gamma	Saros	Map	Gamma
120	April 11, 2051 Partial	1.0169	125	October 4, 2051 Partial	−1.2094
130	March 30, 2052 Total	0.3238	135	September 22, 2052 Annular	−0.448
140	March 20, 2053 Annular	−0.4089	145	September 12, 2053 Total	0.314
150	March 9, 2054 Partial	−1.1711	155	September 2, 2054 Partial	1.0215

=== Saros 140 ===
This eclipse is a part of Saros series 140, repeating every 18 years, 11 days, and containing 71 events. The series started with a partial solar eclipse on April 16, 1512. It contains total eclipses from July 21, 1656 through November 9, 1836; hybrid eclipses from November 20, 1854 through December 23, 1908; and annular eclipses from January 3, 1927 through December 7, 2485. The series ends at member 71 as a partial eclipse on June 1, 2774. Its eclipses are tabulated in three columns; every third eclipse in the same column is one exeligmos apart, so they all cast shadows over approximately the same parts of the Earth.

The longest duration of totality was produced by member 11 at 4 minutes, 10 seconds on August 12, 1692, and the longest duration of annularity will be produced by member 53 at 7 minutes, 35 seconds on November 15, 2449. All eclipses in this series occur at the Moon’s descending node of orbit.

Series members 18–39 occur between 1801 and 2200:
18	19	20
October 29, 1818	November 9, 1836	November 20, 1854
21	22	23
November 30, 1872	December 12, 1890	December 23, 1908
24	25	26
January 3, 1927	January 14, 1945	January 25, 1963
27	28	29
February 4, 1981	February 16, 1999	February 26, 2017
30	31	32
March 9, 2035	March 20, 2053	March 31, 2071
33	34	35
April 10, 2089	April 23, 2107	May 3, 2125
36	37	38
May 14, 2143	May 25, 2161	June 5, 2179
39
June 15, 2197

=== Metonic series ===
The metonic series repeats eclipses every 19 years (6939.69 days), lasting about 5 cycles. Eclipses occur in nearly the same calendar date. In addition, the octon subseries repeats 1/5 of that or every 3.8 years (1387.94 days). All eclipses in this table occur at the Moon's descending node.

22 eclipse events between June 1, 2011 and October 24, 2098
May 31–June 1	March 19–20	January 5–6	October 24–25	August 12–13
118	120	122	124	126
June 1, 2011	March 20, 2015	January 6, 2019	October 25, 2022	August 12, 2026
128	130	132	134	136
June 1, 2030	March 20, 2034	January 5, 2038	October 25, 2041	August 12, 2045
138	140	142	144	146
May 31, 2049	March 20, 2053	January 5, 2057	October 24, 2060	August 12, 2064
148	150	152	154	156
May 31, 2068	March 19, 2072	January 6, 2076	October 24, 2079	August 13, 2083
158	160	162	164	
June 1, 2087			October 24, 2098	

=== Tritos series ===
This eclipse is a part of a tritos cycle, repeating at alternating nodes every 135 synodic months (≈ 3986.63 days, or 11 years minus 1 month). Their appearance and longitude are irregular due to a lack of synchronization with the anomalistic month (period of perigee), but groupings of 3 tritos cycles (≈ 33 years minus 3 months) come close (≈ 434.044 anomalistic months), so eclipses are similar in these groupings.

Series members between 1801 and 2200
March 4, 1802 (Saros 117)	February 1, 1813 (Saros 118)	January 1, 1824 (Saros 119)	November 30, 1834 (Saros 120)	October 30, 1845 (Saros 121)
September 29, 1856 (Saros 122)	August 29, 1867 (Saros 123)	July 29, 1878 (Saros 124)	June 28, 1889 (Saros 125)	May 28, 1900 (Saros 126)
April 28, 1911 (Saros 127)	March 28, 1922 (Saros 128)	February 24, 1933 (Saros 129)	January 25, 1944 (Saros 130)	December 25, 1954 (Saros 131)
November 23, 1965 (Saros 132)	October 23, 1976 (Saros 133)	September 23, 1987 (Saros 134)	August 22, 1998 (Saros 135)	July 22, 2009 (Saros 136)
June 21, 2020 (Saros 137)	May 21, 2031 (Saros 138)	April 20, 2042 (Saros 139)	March 20, 2053 (Saros 140)	February 17, 2064 (Saros 141)
January 16, 2075 (Saros 142)	December 16, 2085 (Saros 143)	November 15, 2096 (Saros 144)	October 16, 2107 (Saros 145)	September 15, 2118 (Saros 146)
August 15, 2129 (Saros 147)	July 14, 2140 (Saros 148)	June 14, 2151 (Saros 149)	May 14, 2162 (Saros 150)	April 12, 2173 (Saros 151)
March 12, 2184 (Saros 152)	February 10, 2195 (Saros 153)			

=== Inex series ===
This eclipse is a part of the long period inex cycle, repeating at alternating nodes, every 358 synodic months (≈ 10,571.95 days, or 29 years minus 20 days). Their appearance and longitude are irregular due to a lack of synchronization with the anomalistic month (period of perigee). However, groupings of 3 inex cycles (≈ 87 years minus 2 months) comes close (≈ 1,151.02 anomalistic months), so eclipses are similar in these groupings.

Series members between 1801 and 2200
August 27, 1821 (Saros 132)	August 7, 1850 (Saros 133)	July 19, 1879 (Saros 134)
June 28, 1908 (Saros 135)	June 8, 1937 (Saros 136)	May 20, 1966 (Saros 137)
April 29, 1995 (Saros 138)	April 8, 2024 (Saros 139)	March 20, 2053 (Saros 140)
February 27, 2082 (Saros 141)	February 8, 2111 (Saros 142)	January 20, 2140 (Saros 143)
December 29, 2168 (Saros 144)	December 9, 2197 (Saros 145)	
