= Solar Saros 140 =

Saros cycle series 140 for solar eclipses

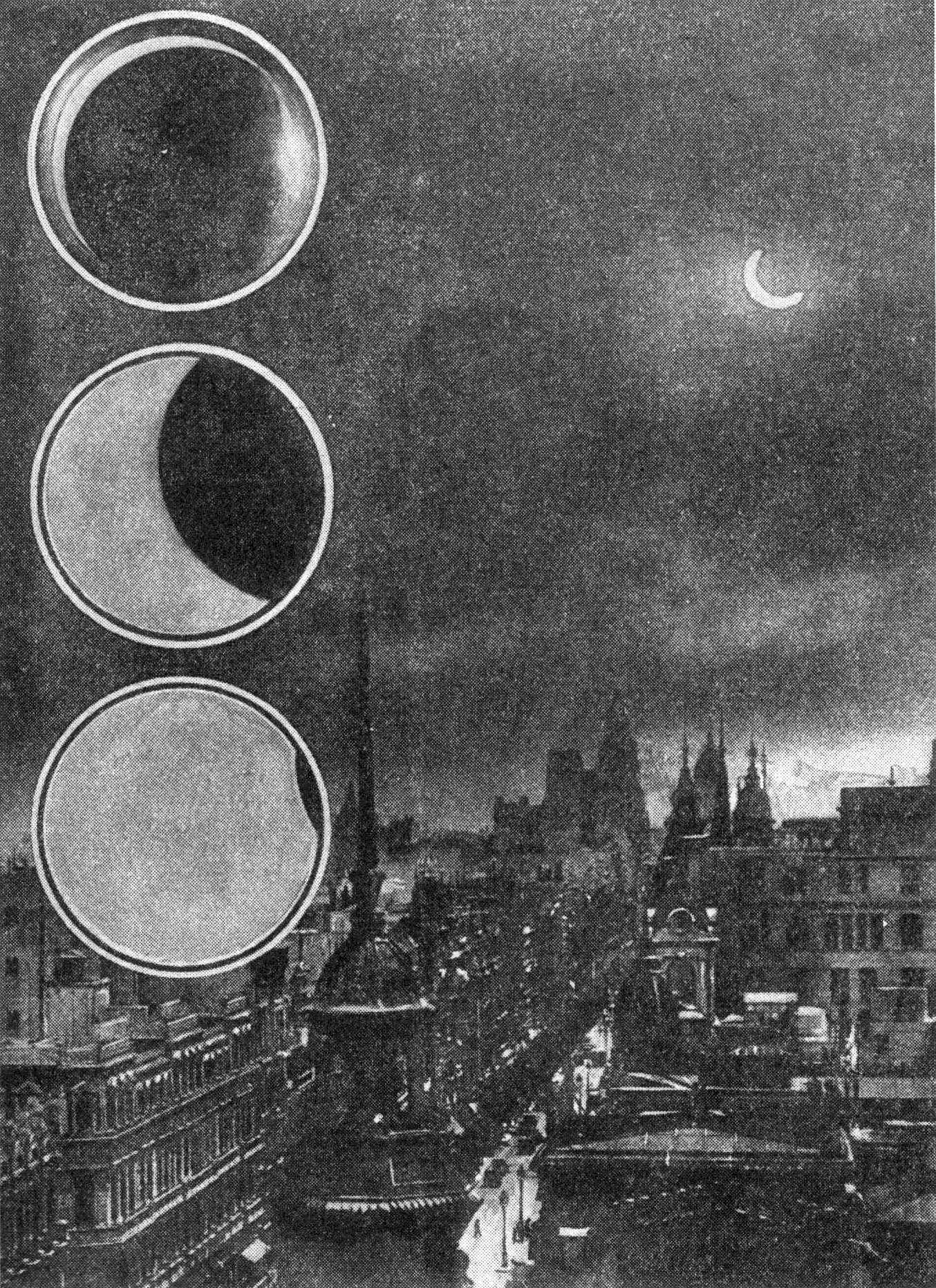
January 3, 1927 event from Buenos Aires, Argentina Partiality from annular event Series member 24

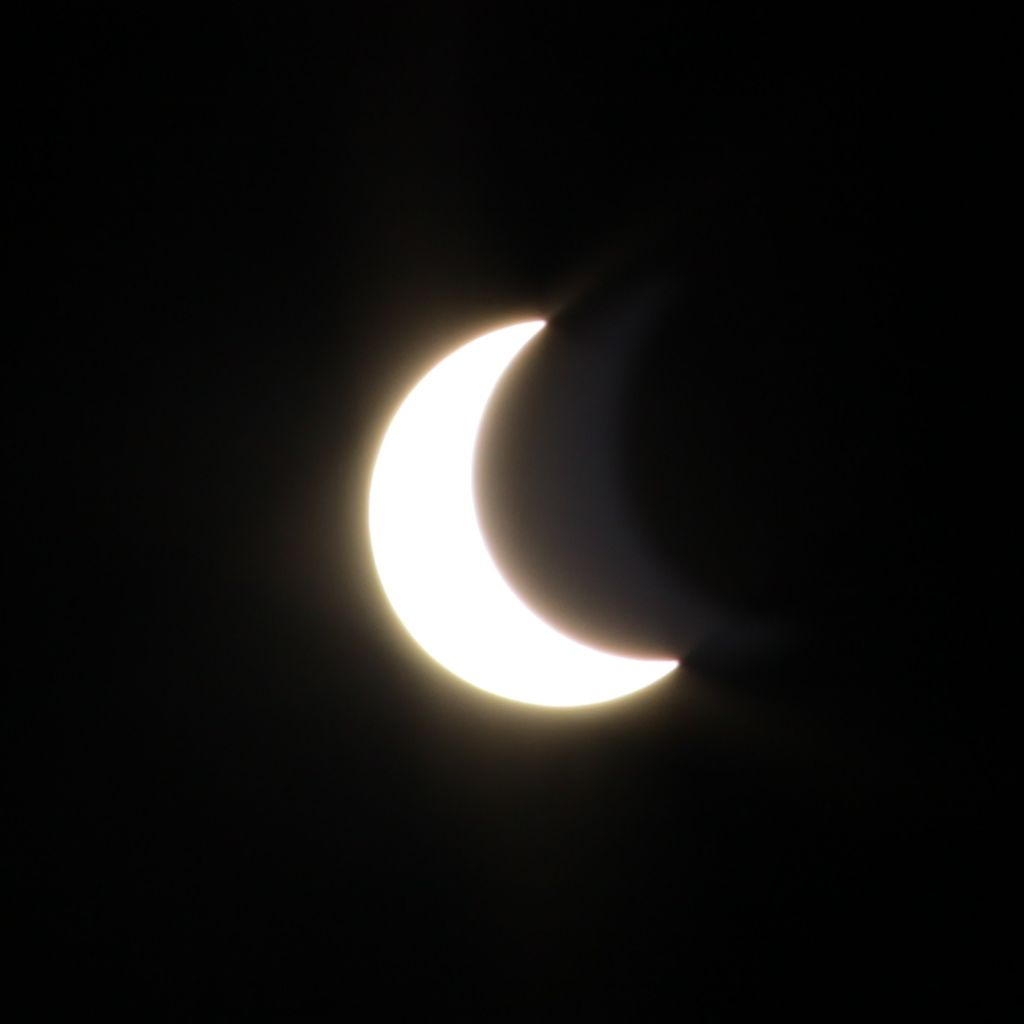
February 26, 2017 event from Buenos Aires, Argentina Partiality from annular event Series member 29

Historic saros cycle animation

Saros cycle series 140 for solar eclipses occurs at the Moon's descending node, repeating every 18 years, 11 days, containing 71 eclipses, including 47 umbral eclipses (11 total, 4 hybrid, 32 annular). The first eclipse in this series was on 16 April 1512 and the last will be on 1 June 2774. The most recent eclipse was an annular eclipse on 26 February 2017 and the next will be an annular eclipse on 9 March 2035.

The longest duration of totality was 4 minutes, 10 seconds on August 12, 1692 while the longest annular eclipse will be 7 minutes 35 seconds on 15 November 2449.

This solar saros is linked to Lunar Saros 133.

Series members 23–53 occurring between 1901 and 2450:
23	24	25
Dec 23, 1908	Jan 3, 1927	Jan 14, 1945
26	27	28
Jan 25, 1963	Feb 4, 1981	Feb 16, 1999
29	30	31
Feb 26, 2017	Mar 9, 2035	Mar 20, 2053
32	33	34
Mar 31, 2071	Apr 10, 2089	Apr 23, 2107
35	36	37
May 3, 2125	May 14, 2143	May 25, 2161
38	39	40
Jun 5, 2179	Jun 15, 2197	Jun 28, 2215
41	42	43
Jul 8, 2233	Jul 19, 2251	Jul 29, 2269
44	45	46
Aug 10, 2287	Aug 21, 2305	Sep 1, 2323
47	48	49
Sep 12, 2341	Sep 23, 2359	Oct 3, 2377
50	51	52
Oct 14, 2395	Oct 25, 2413	Nov 5, 2431
53
Nov 15, 2449

== Umbral eclipses ==
Umbral eclipses (annular, total and hybrid) can be further classified as either: 1) Central (two limits), 2) Central (one limit) or 3) Non-Central (one limit). The statistical distribution of these classes in Saros series 140 appears in the following table.

Classification	Number	Percent
All Umbral eclipses	47	100.00%
Central (two limits)	43	91.49%
Central (one limit)	1	2.13%
Non-central (one limit)	3	6.38%

== All eclipses ==
Note: Dates are given in the Julian calendar prior to 15 October 1582, and in the Gregorian calendar after that.

Saros	Member	Date	Time (Greatest) UTC	Type	Location Lat, Long	Gamma	Mag.	Width (km)	Duration (min:sec)	Ref
140	1	April 16, 1512	6:22:25	Partial	70.6S 131.9E	-1.5289	0.0003			
140	2	April 27, 1530	14:07:20	Partial	69.9S 2.9E	-1.4726	0.1083			
140	3	May 7, 1548	21:46:52	Partial	69S 124.2W	-1.4121	0.225			
140	4	May 19, 1566	5:21:00	Partial	68.1S 110.7E	-1.3472	0.3507			
140	5	June 8, 1584	12:52:25	Partial	67.1S 13.3W	-1.2802	0.4805			
140	6	June 19, 1602	20:19:21	Partial	66.1S 135.7W	-1.2097	0.6174			
140	7	June 30, 1620	3:46:25	Partial	65.1S 102.3E	-1.1393	0.7535			
140	8	July 11, 1638	11:11:52	Partial	64.2S 19W	-1.0676	0.8917			
140	9	July 21, 1656	18:39:48	Total (Note: Non-central)	63.4S 140.7W	0.9983	1.0244	-	-	
140	10	August 2, 1674	2:07:57	Total	45.9S 120.8E	-0.9295	1.056	498	4m 8s	
140	11	August 12, 1692	9:41:05	Total	39.8S 8.6E	-0.8649	1.0546	353	4m 10s	
140	12	August 24, 1710	17:17:16	Total	36.5S 105.1W	-0.8031	1.0519	282	4m 0s	
140	13	September 4, 1728	0:59:22	Total	35S 139.6E	-0.7466	1.0484	236	3m 44s	
140	14	September 15, 1746	8:46:37	Total	34.9S 23E	-0.6948	1.0441	200	3m 23s	
140	15	September 25, 1764	16:41:43	Total	36S 95.5W	-0.6502	1.0394	171	3m 1s	
140	16	October 7, 1782	0:43:19	Total	37.9S 144.6E	-0.6113	1.0344	144	2m 37s	
140	17	October 18, 1800	8:51:53	Total	40.3S 23.2E	-0.5787	1.0293	120	2m 14s	
140	18	October 29, 1818	17:07:10	Total	43.1S 99.4W	-0.5524	1.0241	98	1m 51s	
140	19	November 9, 1836	1:29:26	Total	46.1S 136.8E	-0.5327	1.0191	77	1m 28s	
140	20	November 20, 1854	9:56:58	Hybrid (Note: Began as annular and ended as total)	48.9S 12.7E	-0.5179	1.0144	57	1m 7s	
140	21	November 30, 1872	18:29:33	Hybrid	51.2S 111.8W	-0.5081	1.0099	40	0m 47s	
140	22	December 12, 1890	3:05:28	Hybrid	52.8S 123.9E	-0.5016	1.0059	24	0m 28s	
140	23	December 23, 1908	11:44:28	Hybrid	53.4S 0.5W	-0.4985	1.0024	10	0m 12s	
140	24	January 3, 1927	20:22:53	Annular	52.8S 124.8W	-0.4956	0.9995	2	0m 3s	
140	25	January 14, 1945	5:01:43	Annular	51.1S 110.3E	-0.4937	0.997	12	0m 15s	
140	26	January 25, 1963	13:37:12	Annular	48.2S 15W	-0.4898	0.9951	20	0m 25s	
140	27	February 4, 1981	22:09:24	Annular	44.4S 140.8W	-0.4838	0.9937	25	0m 33s	
140	28	February 16, 1999	6:34:38	Annular	39.8S 93.9E	-0.4726	0.9928	29	0m 40s	
140	29	February 26, 2017	14:54:33	Annular	34.7S 31.2W	-0.4578	0.9922	31	0m 44s	
140	30	March 9, 2035	23:05:54	Annular	29S 154.9W	-0.4368	0.9919	31	0m 48s	
140	31	March 20, 2053	7:08:19	Annular	23S 83E	-0.4089	0.9919	31	0m 50s	
140	32	March 31, 2071	15:01:06	Annular	16.7S 37W	-0.3739	0.9919	31	0m 52s	
140	33	April 10, 2089	22:44:42	Annular	10.2S 154.8W	-0.3319	0.9919	30	0m 53s	
140	34	April 23, 2107	6:18:41	Annular	3.6S 89.9E	-0.2829	0.9918	30	0m 56s	
140	35	May 3, 2125	13:42:33	Annular	3N 22.6W	-0.2263	0.9915	31	0m 59s	
140	36	May 14, 2143	20:58:14	Annular	9.4N 132.7W	-0.1638	0.9908	33	1m 5s	
140	37	May 25, 2161	4:05:43	Annular	15.7N 119.8E	-0.095	0.9898	36	1m 12s	
140	38	June 5, 2179	11:05:36	Annular	21.5N 15E	-0.0209	0.9884	41	1m 21s	
140	39	June 15, 2197	17:59:33	Annular	26.8N 87.6W	0.0574	0.9864	48	1m 32s	
140	40	June 28, 2215	0:48:45	Annular	31.4N 172E	0.1388	0.9839	58	1m 44s	
140	41	July 8, 2233	7:35:24	Annular	35.1N 73.1E	0.2215	0.9809	70	1m 59s	
140	42	July 19, 2251	14:18:46	Annular	38N 24.2W	0.3062	0.9773	85	2m 16s	
140	43	July 29, 2269	21:03:04	Annular	39.9N 121.3W	0.3893	0.9732	104	2m 35s	
140	44	August 10, 2287	3:47:42	Annular	41N 141.8E	0.4714	0.9686	127	2m 56s	
140	45	August 21, 2305	10:35:44	Annular	41.5N 43.7E	0.5497	0.9637	155	3m 21s	
140	46	September 1, 2323	17:26:09	Annular	41.7N 55.3W	0.6253	0.9584	191	3m 48s	
140	47	September 12, 2341	0:22:47	Annular	41.7N 156.4W	0.695	0.9529	234	4m 19s	
140	48	September 23, 2359	7:24:42	Annular	41.9N 100.6E	0.7595	0.9471	291	4m 53s	
140	49	October 3, 2377	14:33:17	Annular	42.6N 4.7W	0.8178	0.9413	366	5m 29s	
140	50	October 14, 2395	21:49:16	Annular	44N 112.4W	0.8691	0.9354	471	6m 7s	
140	51	October 25, 2413	5:13:20	Annular	46.2N 137.3E	0.9129	0.9298	628	6m 43s	
140	52	November 5, 2431	12:45:40	Annular	49.5N 24.5E	0.9496	0.9242	902	7m 15s	
140	53	November 15, 2449	20:23:56	Annular (Note: No northern limit)	54.9N 89.1W	0.981	0.9186	-	7m 35s	
140	54	November 27, 2467	4:10:21	Annular (Note: No northern limit)	63.7N 158.3E	1.0051	0.9434	-	-	
140	55	December 7, 2485	12:02:00	Annular (Note: No northern limit)	64.7N 31.2E	1.0242	0.91	-	-	
140	56	December 19, 2503	19:59:21	Partial	65.7N 97.7W	1.0385	0.8851			
140	57	December 30, 2521	3:58:50	Partial	66.8N 132.5E	1.0507	0.8642			
140	58	January 10, 2540	12:01:35	Partial	67.9N 1.3E	1.06	0.8483			
140	59	January 20, 2558	20:03:53	Partial	69N 130.4W	1.0693	0.8326			
140	60	February 1, 2576	4:04:59	Partial	70N 97.6E	1.0793	0.8161			
140	61	February 11, 2594	12:02:17	Partial	70.9N 34.1W	1.0921	0.7951			
140	62	February 23, 2612	19:55:50	Partial	71.6N 165.6W	1.1076	0.7697			
140	63	March 6, 2630	3:42:09	Partial	72.1N 64.3E	1.1288	0.735			
140	64	March 16, 2648	11:21:54	Partial	72.3N 64.5W	1.1552	0.6917			
140	65	March 27, 2666	18:53:07	Partial	72.2N 168.8E	1.1881	0.6371			
140	66	April 7, 2684	2:17:17	Partial	71.9N 44E	1.2265	0.5732			
140	67	April 19, 2702	9:30:34	Partial	71.4N 77.6W	1.2736	0.4942			
140	68	April 29, 2720	16:37:17	Partial	70.7N 163.1E	1.3257	0.4061			
140	69	May 10, 2738	23:34:31	Partial	69.8N 46.7E	1.3856	0.3042			
140	70	May 21, 2756	6:26:50	Partial	68.8N 67.7W	1.449	0.1955			
140	71	June 1, 2774	13:10:10	Partial	67.8N 179.3W	1.5196	0.0738			
