= C/2020 S3 (Erasmus) =

Non-periodic comet

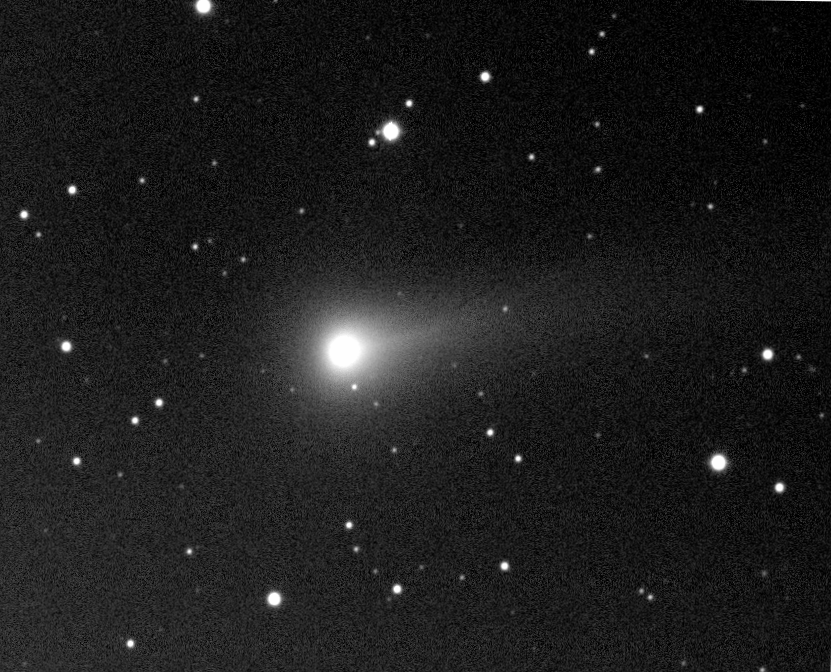
- Comet Erasmus photographed from the Zwicky Transient Facility on 14 November 2020

Discovery
- Discovered by: Nicolas Erasmus
- Discovery site: ATLAS–MLO (T08)
- Discovery date: 17 September 2020

Designations
- Alternative designations: CK20S030

Orbital characteristics
- Epoch: 11 March 2021 (JD 2459284.5)
- Observation arc: 436 days (1.19 years)
- Number of observations: 861
- Aphelion: 389.268 AU
- Perihelion: 0.3985 AU
- Semi-major axis: 194.833 AU
- Eccentricity: 0.99795
- Orbital period: ~2,720 years
- Inclination: 19.861°
- Longitude of ascending node: 222.993°
- Argument of periapsis: 349.886°
- Mean anomaly: 0.032°
- Last perihelion: 12 December 2020
- T_{Jupiter}: 0.762
- Earth MOID: 0.315 AU
- Jupiter MOID: 0.584 AU

Physical characteristics
- Mean diameter: 1.6–2.4 km (0.99–1.49 mi)
- Comet total magnitude (M1): 13.0
- Comet nuclear magnitude (M2): 14.8
- Apparent magnitude: 3.9 (2020 apparition)

Comet Erasmus, formally designated as C/2020 S3, is a non-periodic comet which passed perihelion on 12 December 2020. Its maximum brightness peaked around an apparent magnitude of 4, however its proximity to the Sun at that time made it a difficult object to view from the ground.

== Observational history ==
The comet was discovered as an 18.5-magnitude object from four 30-second exposure images taken on 17 September 2020 from the ATLAS–MLO observatory in Mauna Loa, Hawaii. It was initially flagged as a potential near-Earth asteroid until Dr. Nicolas Erasmus analyzed the images and noticed a faint coma around it shortly before announcing the discovery.

It was visible in predawn skies as it made its closest approach to Earth at a distance of 1.09 AU (163 million km) on 19 November 2020. Around this time, the comet was located within the constellation Hydra.

It was predicted to reach a maximum brightness of magnitude 3.0–4.0 during its perihelion on 12 December 2020 at a distance of 0.4 AU (60 million km) from the Sun. However, the comet's position throughout December was too close to the Sun for ground observations, making it impossible to view at its brightest except from SOHO and STEREO-A.

Several observers were able to capture it during the total solar eclipse on 14 December 2020.

== Physical characteristics ==
The comet's linear polarization was measured between 13 and 23 November 2020, where astronomers have noted a similar performance as that seen from C/1989 X1 (Austin) and C/1996 B2 (Hyakutake), with models suggesting a decrease in the abundance of Mg–rich silicate particles in the inner coma by 1/3, revealing a change in the emanations of dust particles from the comet's nucleus. Chemical analysis of the comet showed that its coma is enriched in formaldehyde (H_{2}CO), ammonia (NH_{3}), and acetylene (C_{2}H_{2}) compounds, however it is noticeably depleted of any methanol (CH_{3}OH).

During perihelion in December 2020, the comet's tail had exhibited wagging behaviour due to its interaction with a coronal mass ejection from the Sun. Its water production rate reached a maximum of 3.5×10^{29} sec^{−1} around this time. By the time it reached 1.45 AU (217 million km) on its outbound journey, its water production rate was still seven times higher than previously observed before perihelion, which was estimated to be around 1×10^{28} sec^{−1}.

The nucleus is estimated to be around 1.6–2.4 km (0.99–1.49 mi) in diameter.

== See also ==
- C/2020 X3 (SOHO) - another comet that could be photographed during the 14 December 2020 solar eclipse
