= 2011 lunar eclipse =

The 2011 lunar eclipse may refer to:

- June 2011 lunar eclipse
- December 2011 lunar eclipse
