= Solar eclipse of December 14, 2020 =

Total eclipse

- Total eclipse
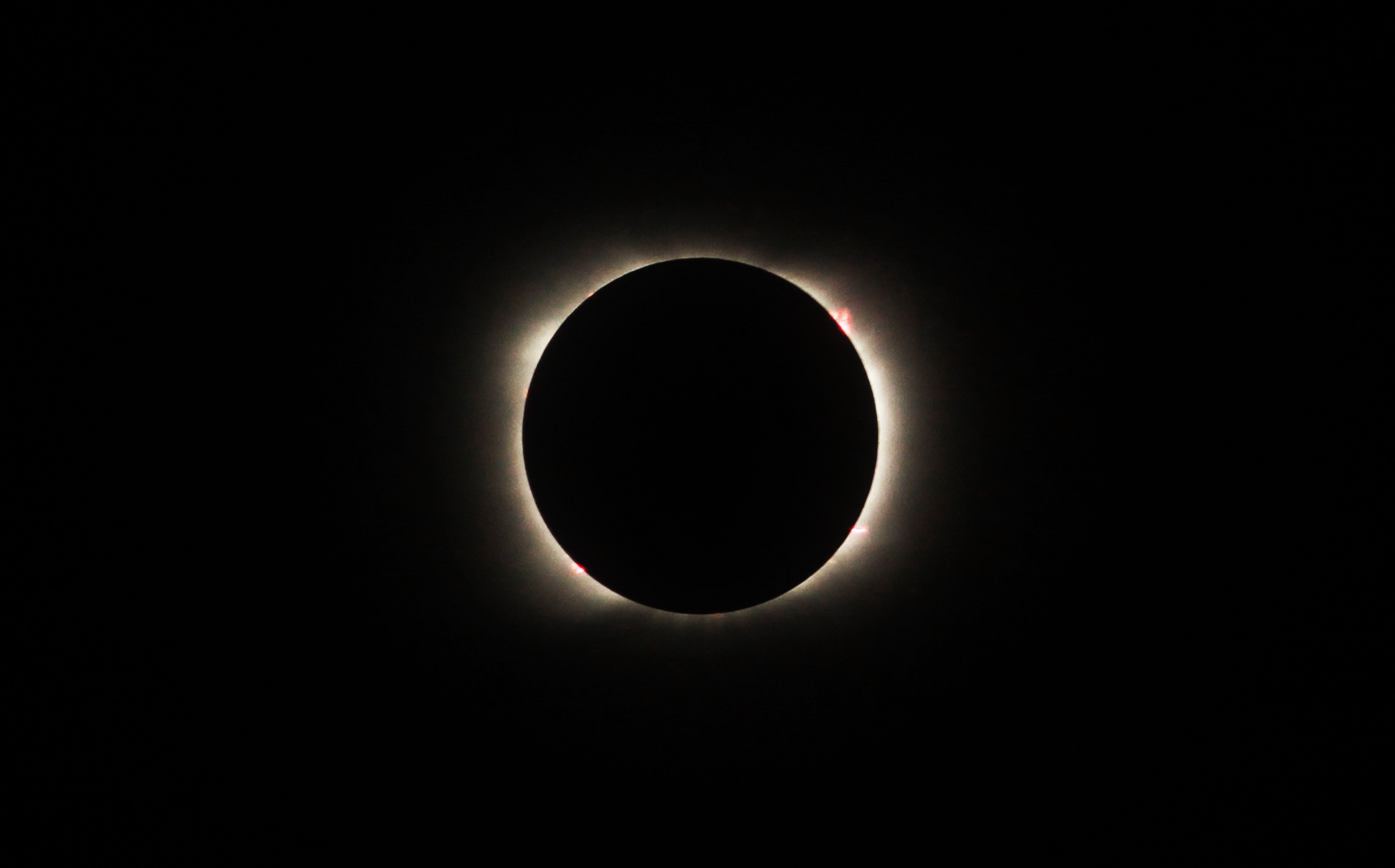
- Totality as viewed from Gorbea, Chile

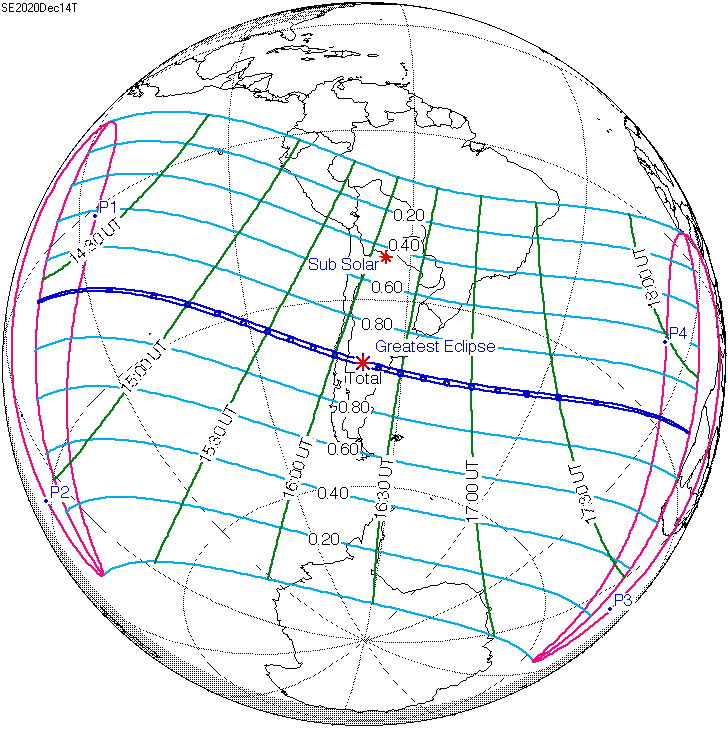
- Map
- Gamma: −0.2939
- Magnitude: 1.0254

Maximum eclipse
- Duration: 130 s (2 min 10 s)
- Coordinates: 40.3°S 67.9°W
- Max. width of band: 90 km (56 mi)

Times (UTC)
- Greatest eclipse: 16:14:39

References
- Saros: 142 (23 of 72)
- Catalog # (SE5000): 9554

A total solar eclipse occurred at the Moon's descending node of orbit on Monday, December 14, 2020, with a magnitude of 1.0254. A total solar eclipse occurs when the Moon's apparent diameter is larger than the Sun's and the apparent path of the Sun and Moon intersect, blocking all direct sunlight and turning daylight into darkness; the Sun appears to be black with a halo around it. Totality occurs in a narrow path across Earth's surface, with the partial solar eclipse visible over a surrounding region thousands of kilometres wide. Occurring about 1.8 days after perigee (on December 12, 2020, at 20:40 UTC), the Moon's apparent diameter was larger.

Totality was visible from parts of southern Chile and Argentina. A partial eclipse was visible for parts of central and southern South America, Southern Africa, and Antarctica. A total solar eclipse crossed a similar region of the Earth about a year and a half earlier on July 2, 2019.

== Visibility ==
Animated path

=== Chile ===
Totality made landfall in Puerto Saavedra, before traversing through portions of Araucanía Region, Los Ríos Region, and a very small part of Bío Bío Region. Cities in the path included Temuco, Villarrica, and Pucón. Totality was also visible on Mocha Island. The eclipse's path was similar to the solar eclipse of February 26, 2017. It occurred just 17 months after the solar eclipse of July 2, 2019 and, like the 2019 eclipse, was also visible from Chile and Argentina. It was also a partial solar eclipse in Bolivia, Brazil, Ecuador, Paraguay, Peru and Uruguay.

=== Argentina ===
Totality was visible across the Northern Patagonia (specifically the provinces of Neuquén and Río Negro), passing through cities including Piedra del Águila, Sierra Colorada, Ministro Ramos Mexía, Junín de los Andes, and partially in San Martín de los Andes and San Carlos de Bariloche.

== Eclipse timing ==
=== Places experiencing total eclipse ===
Solar Eclipse of December 14, 2020 (Local Times)
Country or territory	City or place	Start of partial eclipse	Start of total eclipse	Maximum eclipse	End of total eclipse	End of partial eclipse	Duration of totality (min:s)	Duration of eclipse (hr:min)	Maximum magnitude
Chile	Temuco	11:39:54	13:02:40	13:02:47	13:02:53	14:30:16	0:13	2:50	1.0006
Chile	Villarrica	11:41:15	13:02:59	13:04:03	13:05:08	14:31:12	2:09	2:50	1.0127

=== Places experiencing partial eclipse ===
Solar Eclipse of December 14, 2020 (Local Times)
Country or territory	City or place	Start of partial eclipse	Maximum eclipse	End of partial eclipse	Duration of eclipse (hr:min)	Maximum coverage
Clipperton Island	Clipperton Island	05:46:35	06:21:49	06:59:40	1:13	9.90%
Ecuador	Galápagos Islands	07:58:26	08:40:45	09:27:23	1:29	9.41%
Pitcairn Islands	Adamstown	05:58:30	06:48:49	07:43:39	1:45	53.34%
French Polynesia	Taioha'e	05:23:37 (sunrise)	05:25:59	05:59:58	0:36	52.11%
Peru	Lima	09:16:41	10:16:19	11:23:19	2:07	17.19%
French Polynesia	Papeete	05:18:06 (sunrise)	05:20:35	05:34:28	0:16	13.03%
Bolivia	La Paz	10:40:55	11:48:07	13:00:35	2:20	17.69%
Bolivia	Sucre	10:47:59	12:00:55	13:17:40	2:30	22.08%
Chile	Santiago	11:36:27	13:01:27	14:31:35	2:55	78.66%
Paraguay	Asunción	12:07:34	13:31:38	14:53:31	2:46	37.56%
Argentina	Buenos Aires	12:03:59	13:32:38	14:59:17	2:55	73.66%
Falkland Islands	Stanley	12:20:26	13:35:16	14:48:54	2:28	64.64%
Uruguay	Montevideo	12:09:21	13:38:06	15:03:38	2:54	74.14%
Antarctica	Orcadas Base	12:47:09	13:47:17	14:45:46	1:59	35.51%
Brazil	Pelotas	12:19:26	13:47:47	15:10:37	2:51	61.08%
Brazil	Rio Grande	12:20:00	13:48:22	15:11:08	2:51	62.12%
South Georgia and the South Sandwich Islands	King Edward Point	13:52:43	15:00:35	16:04:50	2:12	53.20%
Lesotho	Maseru	18:54:09	19:02:22	19:05:11 (sunset)	0:11	6.57%
Brazil	Brasília	13:05:54	14:03:17	14:56:03	1:50	8.50%
Brazil	São Paulo	12:45:42	14:05:05	15:16:34	2:31	31.57%
Botswana	Ghanzi	18:58:37	19:09:08	19:11:45 (sunset)	0:13	9.99%
Botswana	Tsabong	18:56:13	19:11:09	19:17:57 (sunset)	0:22	16.22%
Brazil	Rio de Janeiro	12:57:10	14:14:19	15:22:51	2:26	31.17%
Bouvet Island	Bouvet Island	17:34:22	18:21:50	19:06:55	1:33	26.80%
Angola	Lubango	18:04:48	18:28:36	18:31:05 (sunset)	0:26	29.69%
Namibia	Windhoek	18:58:41	19:29:12	19:31:50 (sunset)	0:33	45.47%
Saint Helena, Ascension and Tristan da Cunha	Edinburgh of the Seven Seas	16:32:29	17:40:07	18:40:58	2:08	89.74%
Namibia	Walvis Bay	18:58:33	19:40:18	19:42:56 (sunset)	0:44	69.27%
South Africa	Cape Town	18:52:05	19:43:34	19:53:06 (sunset)	1:01	59.36%
Saint Helena, Ascension and Tristan da Cunha	Jamestown	17:03:11	18:01:03	18:49:51 (sunset)	1:47	50.25%

== Scientific observations ==
The ionospheric effects of the eclipse were expected to be monitored as part of the December 2020 Eclipse Festival of Frequency Measurement, a citizen science experiment organized through the Amateur Radio Science Citizen Investigation (HamSCI). Also, a prediction was made for a group of ionospheric stations in South America, using a numerical model (SUPIM-INPE), of the ionospheric response to this event.

Coincidentally, a comet belonging to the Kreutz sungrazer family called C/2020 X3 (SOHO) appeared during the eclipse, which later disintegrated shortly before reaching perihelion around the same day.

== Gallery ==
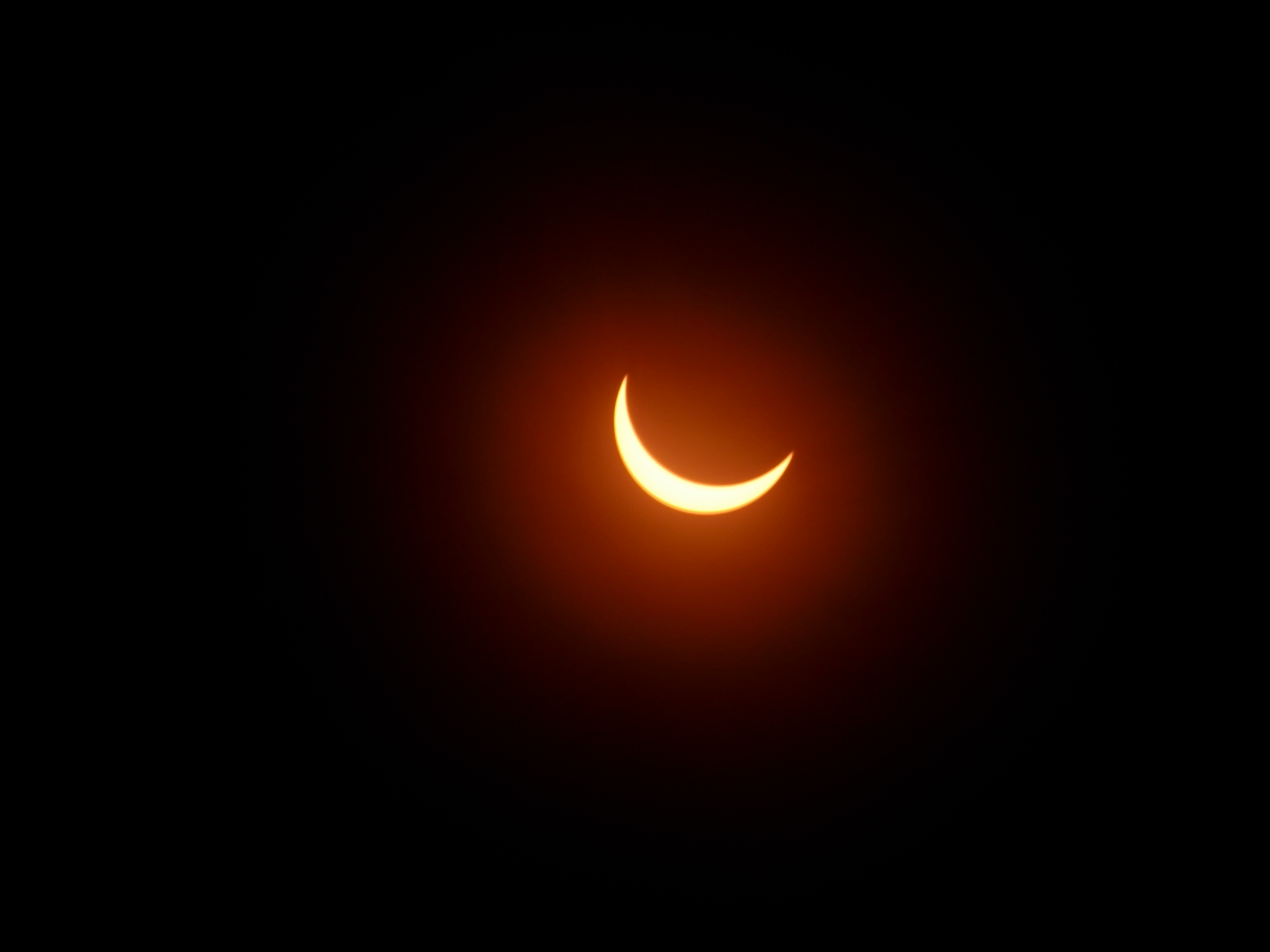
Partial from Rengo, Chile, 15:07 UTC

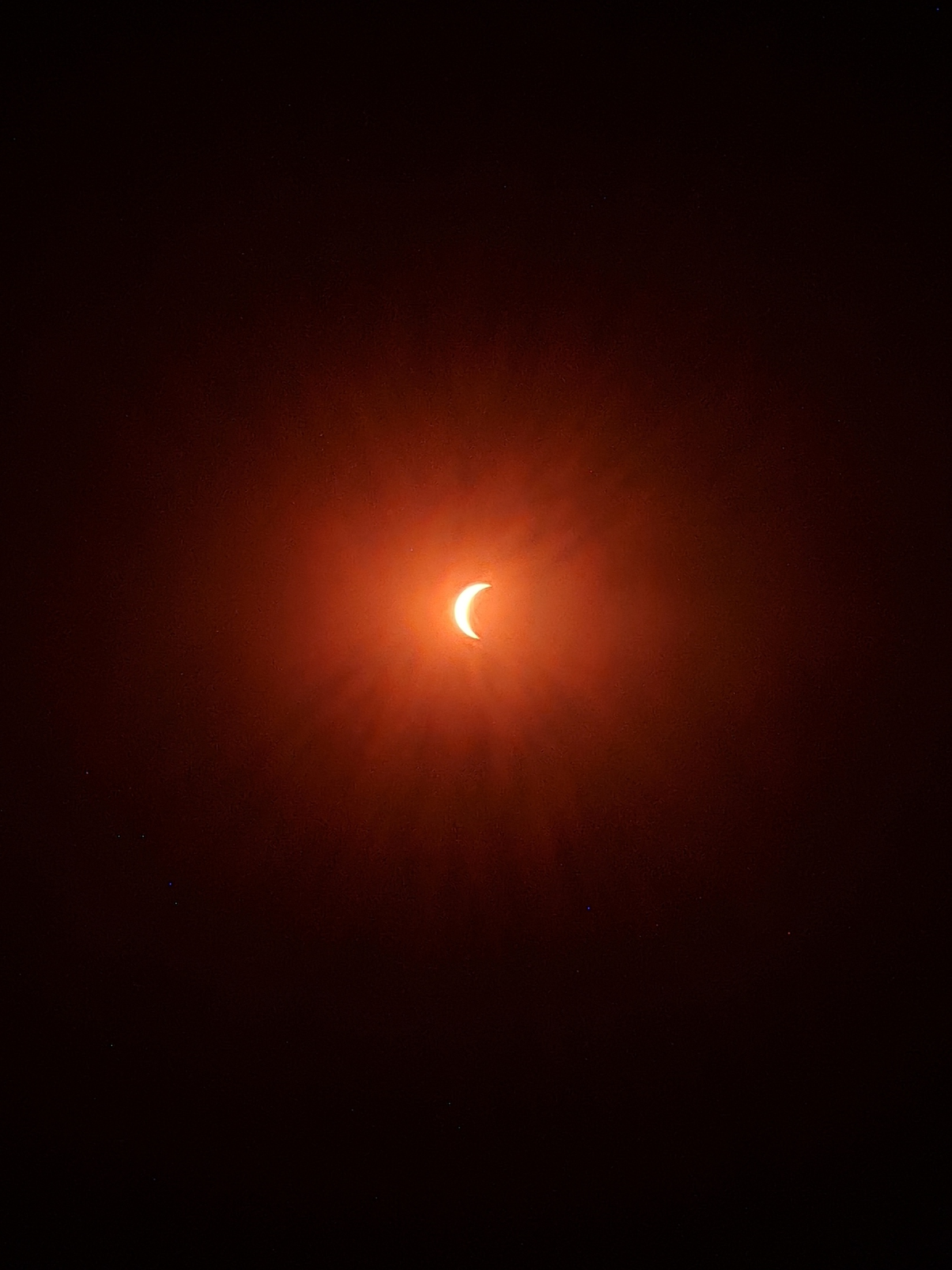
Partial from Santiago de Chile, 16:02 UTC

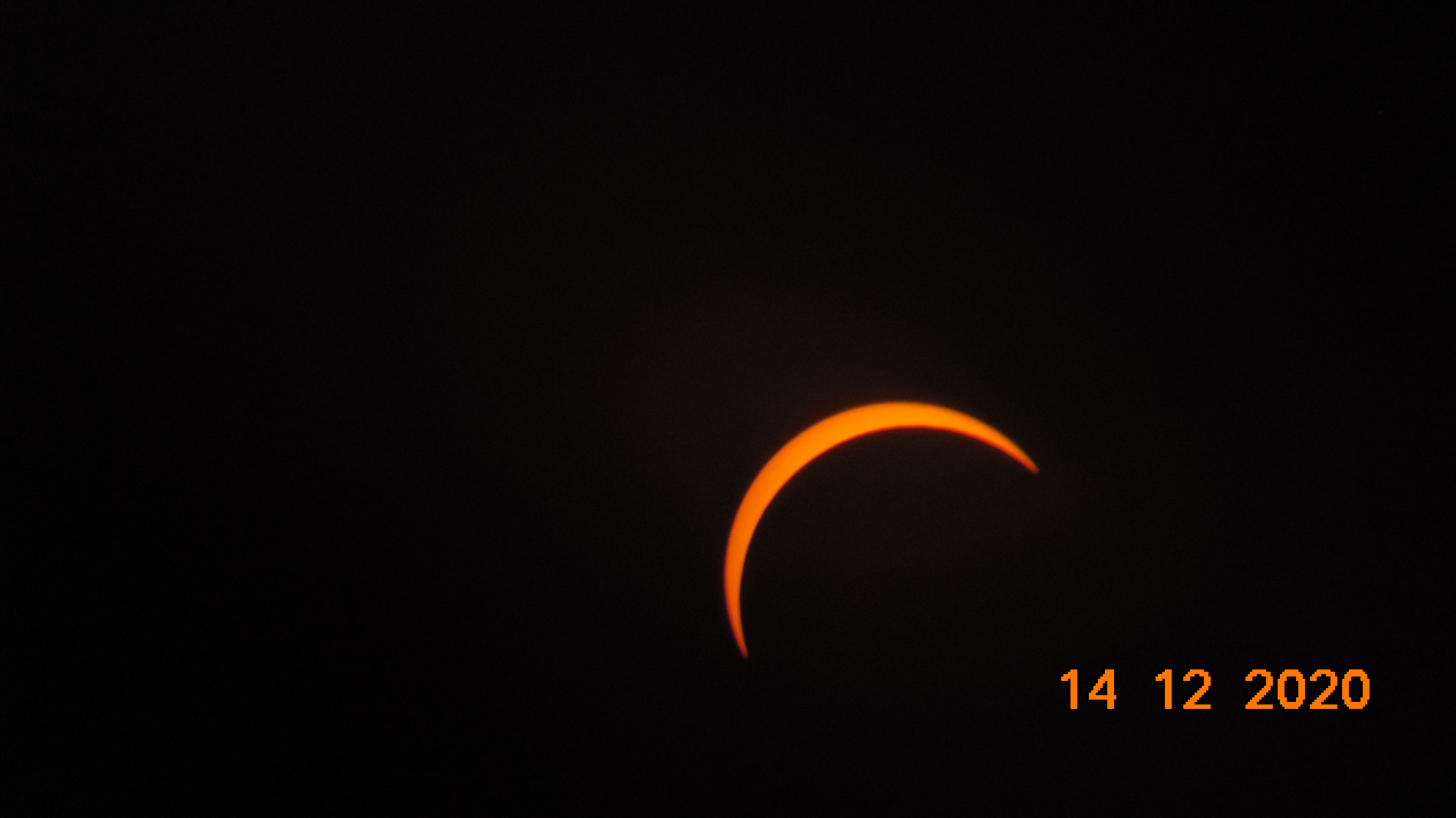
Partial from Puerto Varas, Chile, 16:09 UTC

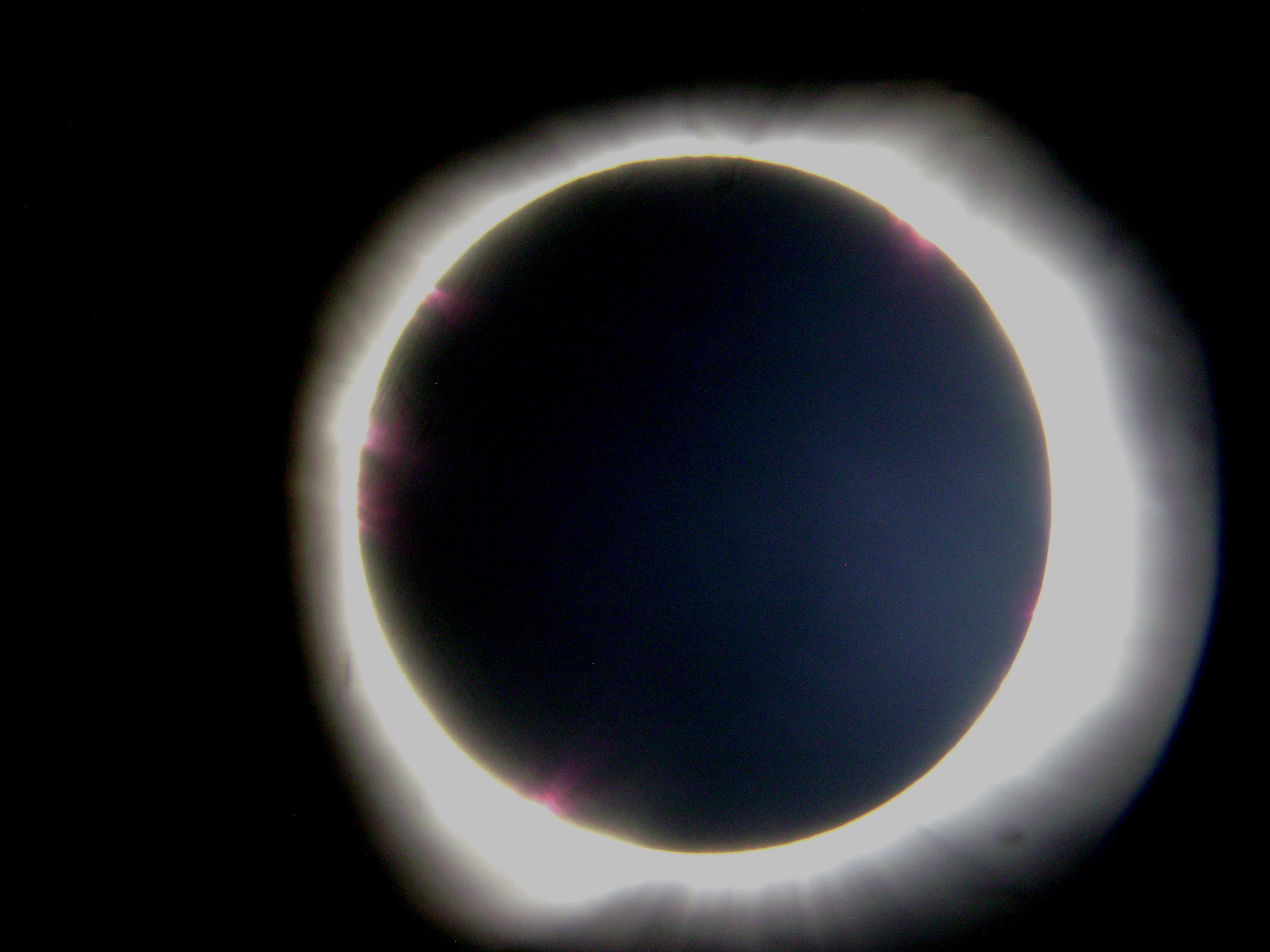
Totality from Ministro Ramos Mexía, Argentina, 16:14 UTC

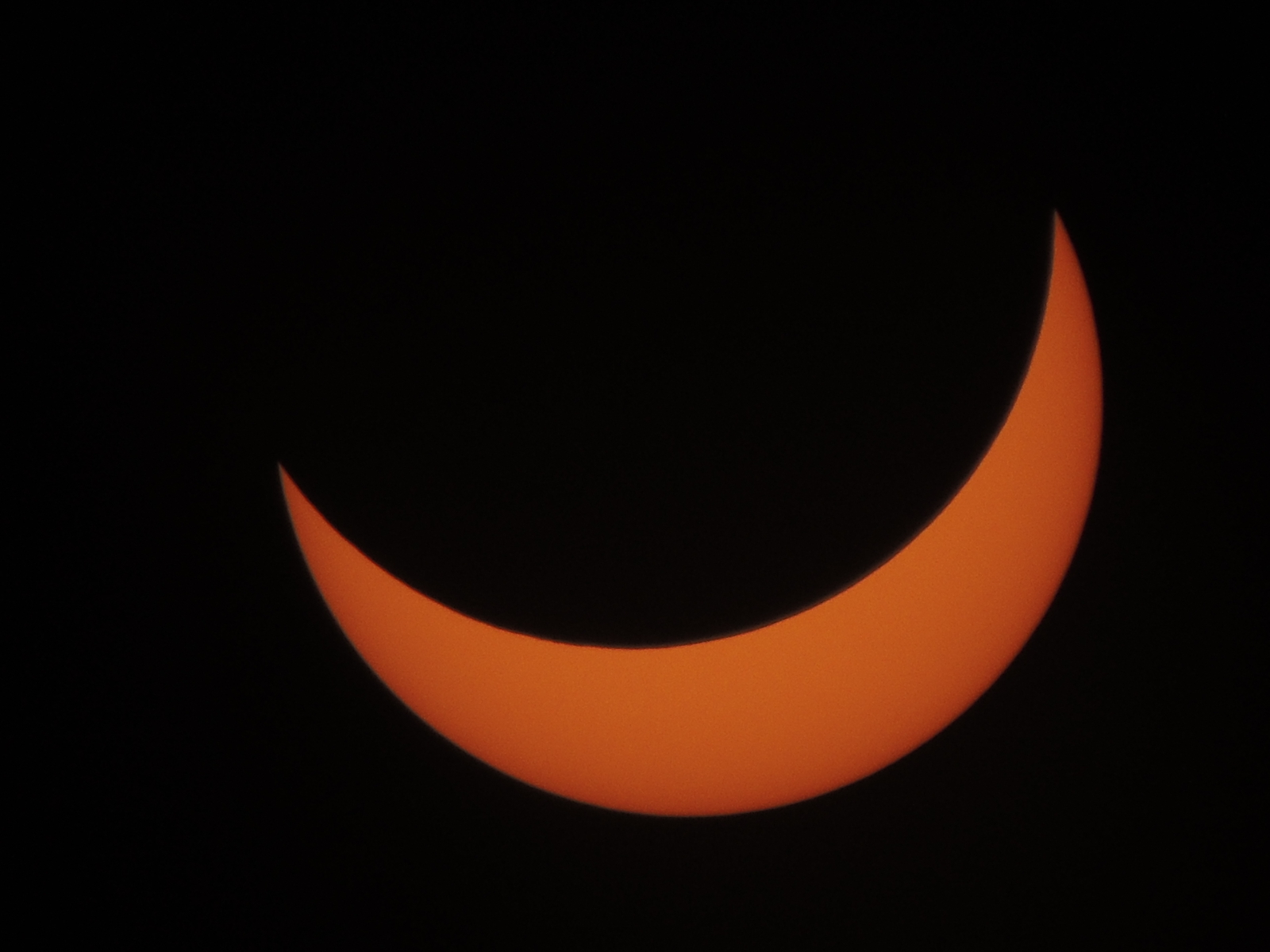
Partial from Manuel B. Gonnet, Argentina, 16:32 UTC

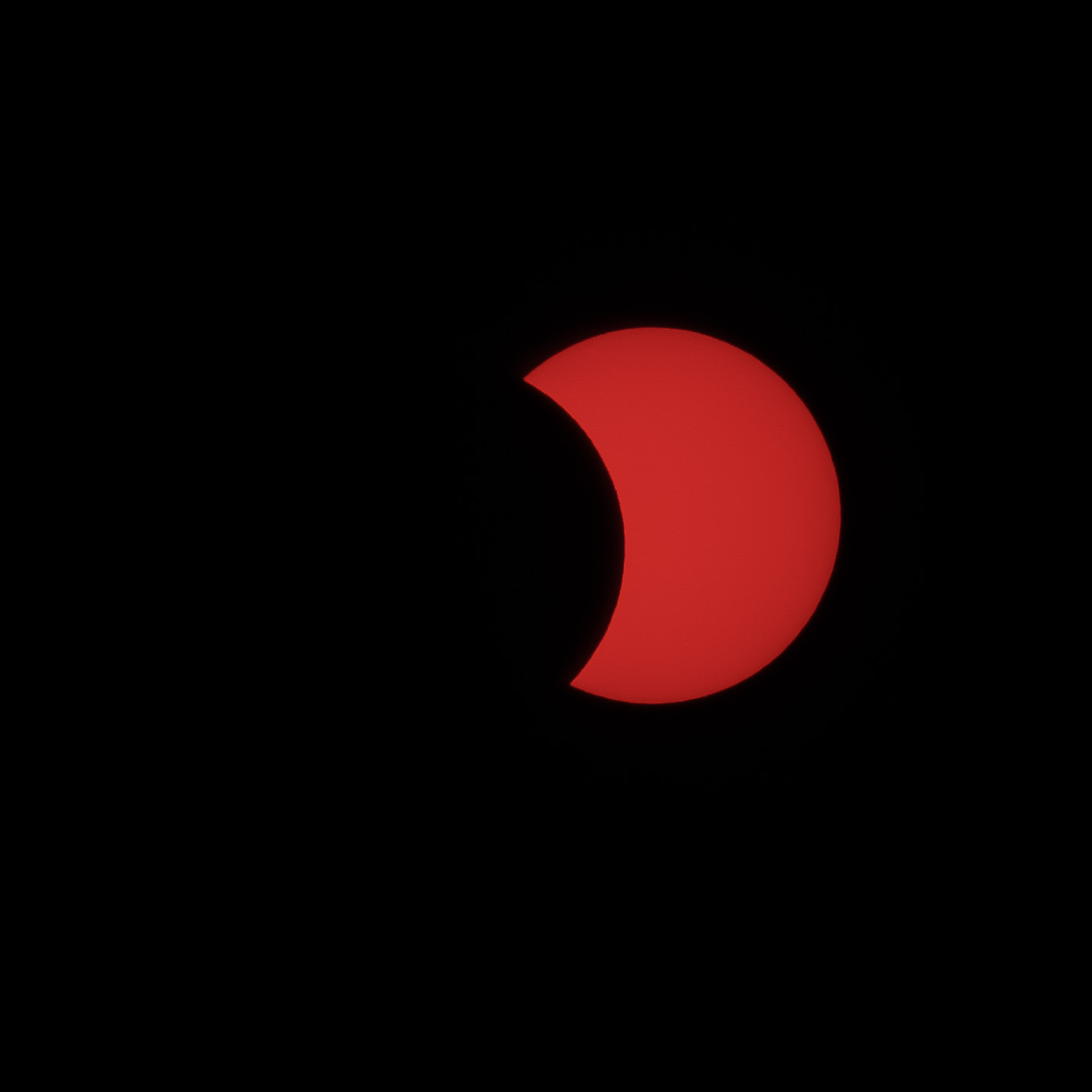
Partial from Guarulhos, Brazil, 17:01 UTC

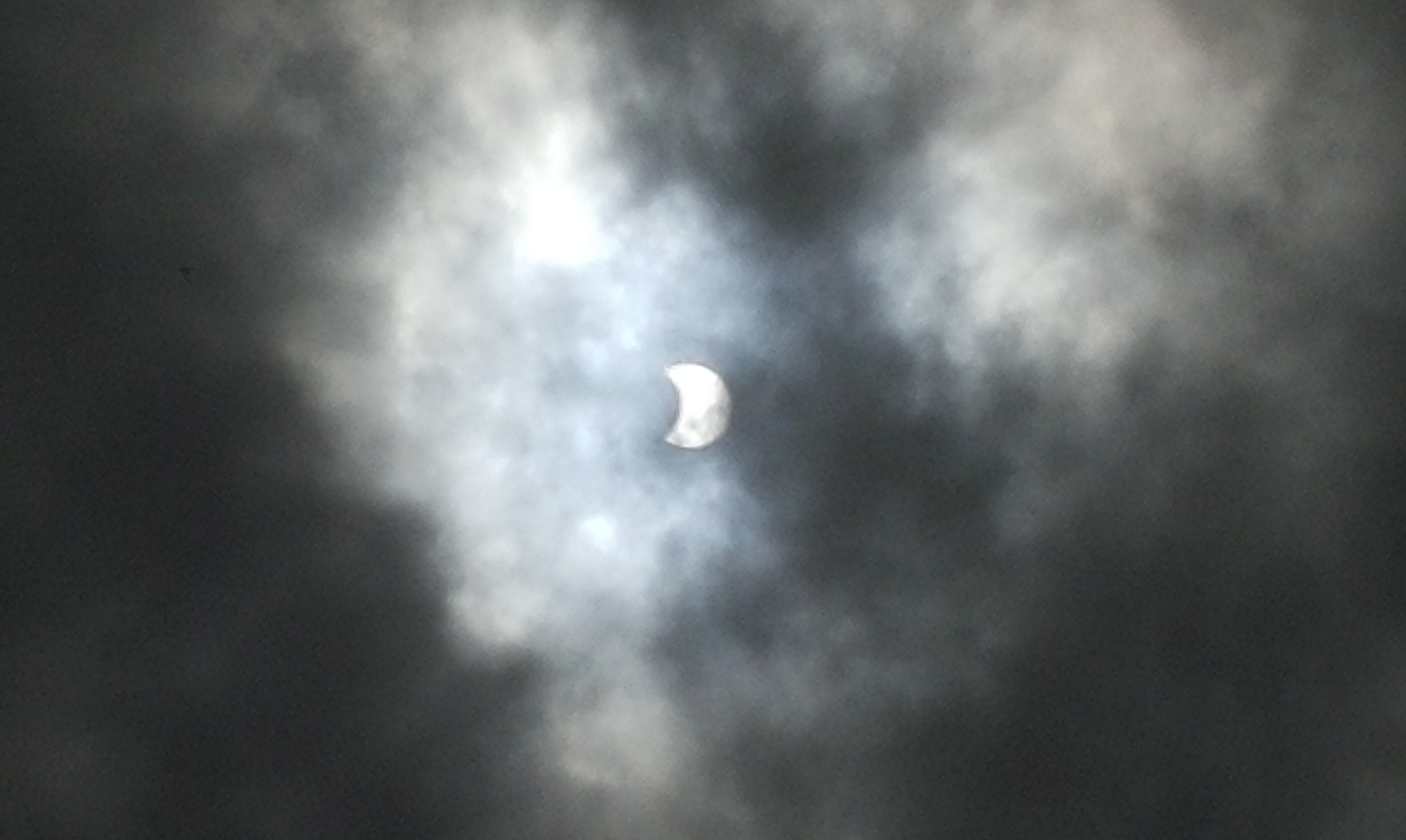
Partial from Taubaté, Brazil, 17:13 UTC

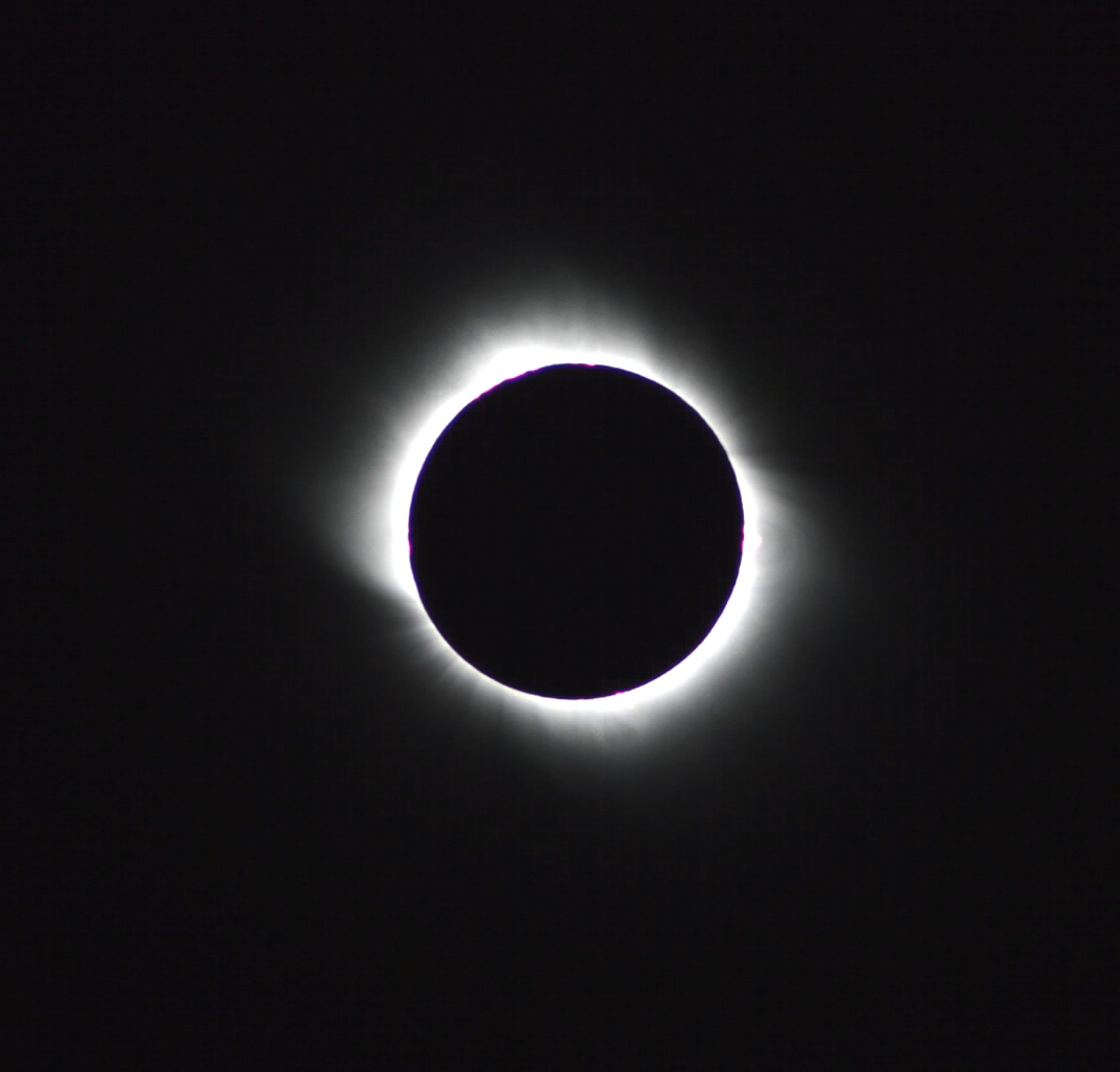
Totality from Valcheta, Argentina

== Eclipse details ==
Shown below are two tables displaying details about this particular solar eclipse. The first table outlines times at which the Moon's penumbra or umbra attains the specific parameter, and the second table describes various other parameters pertaining to this eclipse.

December 14, 2020 Solar Eclipse Times
Event	Time (UTC)
First Penumbral External Contact	2020 December 14 at 13:35:04.2 UTC
First Umbral External Contact	2020 December 14 at 14:33:44.2 UTC
First Central Line	2020 December 14 at 14:34:00.3 UTC
First Umbral Internal Contact	2020 December 14 at 14:34:16.4 UTC
First Penumbral Internal Contact	2020 December 14 at 15:38:01.7 UTC
Greatest Eclipse	2020 December 14 at 16:14:39.4 UTC
Greatest Duration	2020 December 14 at 16:14:45.1 UTC
Ecliptic Conjunction	2020 December 14 at 16:17:44.3 UTC
Equatorial Conjunction	2020 December 14 at 16:19:21.9 UTC
Last Penumbral Internal Contact	2020 December 14 at 16:51:09.2 UTC
Last Umbral Internal Contact	2020 December 14 at 17:55:01.7 UTC
Last Central Line	2020 December 14 at 17:55:15.8 UTC
Last Umbral External Contact	2020 December 14 at 17:55:29.8 UTC
Last Penumbral External Contact	2020 December 14 at 18:54:16.8 UTC

December 14, 2020 Solar Eclipse Parameters
Parameter	Value
Eclipse Magnitude	1.02536
Eclipse Obscuration	1.05136
Gamma	−0.29394
Sun Right Ascension	17h30m05.9s
Sun Declination	-23°15'32.3"
Sun Semi-Diameter	16'14.9"
Sun Equatorial Horizontal Parallax	08.9"
Moon Right Ascension	17h29m54.3s
Moon Declination	-23°32'58.8"
Moon Semi-Diameter	16'23.7"
Moon Equatorial Horizontal Parallax	1°00'10.4"
ΔT	70.2 s

== Eclipse season ==
This eclipse is part of an eclipse season, a period, roughly every six months, when eclipses occur. Only two (or occasionally three) eclipse seasons occur each year, and each season lasts about 35 days and repeats just short of six months (173 days) later; thus two full eclipse seasons always occur each year. Either two or three eclipses happen each eclipse season. In the sequence below, each eclipse is separated by a fortnight.

Eclipse season of November–December 2020
November 30 Ascending node (full moon)	December 14 Descending node (new moon)
Penumbral lunar eclipse Lunar Saros 116	Total solar eclipse Solar Saros 142

== Related eclipses ==
This eclipse took place one lunar year after the Solar eclipse of December 26, 2019.

=== Eclipses in 2020 ===
- A penumbral lunar eclipse on January 10.
- A penumbral lunar eclipse on June 5.
- An annular solar eclipse on June 21.
- A penumbral lunar eclipse on July 5.
- A penumbral lunar eclipse on November 30.
- A total solar eclipse on December 14.

=== Metonic ===
- Preceded by: Solar eclipse of February 26, 2017
- Followed by: Solar eclipse of October 2, 2024

=== Tzolkinex ===
- Preceded by: Solar eclipse of November 3, 2013
- Followed by: Solar eclipse of January 26, 2028

=== Half-Saros ===
- Preceded by: Lunar eclipse of December 10, 2011
- Followed by: Lunar eclipse of December 20, 2029

=== Tritos ===
- Preceded by: Solar eclipse of January 15, 2010
- Followed by: Solar eclipse of November 14, 2031

=== Solar Saros 142 ===
- Preceded by: Solar eclipse of December 4, 2002
- Followed by: Solar eclipse of December 26, 2038

=== Inex ===
- Preceded by: Solar eclipse of January 4, 1992
- Followed by: Solar eclipse of November 25, 2049

=== Triad ===
- Preceded by: Solar eclipse of February 14, 1934
- Followed by: Solar eclipse of October 16, 2107

=== Solar eclipses of 2018–2021 ===
This eclipse is a member of a semester series. An eclipse in a semester series of solar eclipses repeats approximately every 177 days and 4 hours (a semester) at alternating nodes of the Moon's orbit.

The partial solar eclipses on February 15, 2018 and August 11, 2018 occur in the previous lunar year eclipse set.

Solar eclipse series sets from 2018 to 2021
Ascending node			Descending node		
Saros	Map	Gamma	Saros	Map	Gamma
117 Partial in Melbourne, Australia	July 13, 2018 Partial	−1.35423	122 Partial in Nakhodka, Russia	January 6, 2019 Partial	1.14174
127 Totality in La Serena, Chile	July 2, 2019 Total	−0.64656	132 Annularity in Jaffna, Sri Lanka	December 26, 2019 Annular	0.41351
137 Annularity in Beigang, Yunlin, Taiwan	June 21, 2020 Annular	0.12090	142 Totality in Gorbea, Chile	December 14, 2020 Total	−0.29394
147 Partial in Halifax, Canada	June 10, 2021 Annular	0.91516	152 From HMS Protector off South Georgia	December 4, 2021 Total	−0.95261

=== Saros 142 ===
This eclipse is a part of Saros series 142, repeating every 18 years, 11 days, and containing 72 events. The series started with a partial solar eclipse on April 17, 1624. It contains a hybrid eclipse on July 14, 1768, and total eclipses from July 25, 1786 through October 29, 2543. There are no annular eclipses in this set. The series ends at member 72 as a partial eclipse on June 5, 2904. Its eclipses are tabulated in three columns; every third eclipse in the same column is one exeligmos apart, so they all cast shadows over approximately the same parts of the Earth.

The longest duration of totality will be produced by member 38 at 6 minutes, 34 seconds on May 28, 2291. All eclipses in this series occur at the Moon’s descending node of orbit.

Series members 11–32 occur between 1801 and 2200:
11	12	13
August 5, 1804	August 16, 1822	August 27, 1840
14	15	16
September 7, 1858	September 17, 1876	September 29, 1894
17	18	19
October 10, 1912	October 21, 1930	November 1, 1948
20	21	22
November 12, 1966	November 22, 1984	December 4, 2002
23	24	25
December 14, 2020	December 26, 2038	January 5, 2057
26	27	28
January 16, 2075	January 27, 2093	February 8, 2111
29	30	31
February 18, 2129	March 2, 2147	March 12, 2165
32
March 23, 2183

=== Metonic series ===
The metonic series repeats eclipses every 19 years (6939.69 days), lasting about 5 cycles. Eclipses occur in nearly the same calendar date. In addition, the octon subseries repeats 1/5 of that or every 3.8 years (1387.94 days). All eclipses in this table occur at the Moon's descending node.

21 eclipse events between July 22, 1971 and July 22, 2047
July 22	May 9–11	February 26–27	December 14–15	October 2–3
116	118	120	122	124
July 22, 1971	May 11, 1975	February 26, 1979	December 15, 1982	October 3, 1986
126	128	130	132	134
July 22, 1990	May 10, 1994	February 26, 1998	December 14, 2001	October 3, 2005
136	138	140	142	144
July 22, 2009	May 10, 2013	February 26, 2017	December 14, 2020	October 2, 2024
146	148	150	152	154
July 22, 2028	May 9, 2032	February 27, 2036	December 15, 2039	October 3, 2043
156
July 22, 2047

=== Tritos series ===
This eclipse is a part of a tritos cycle, repeating at alternating nodes every 135 synodic months (≈ 3986.63 days, or 11 years minus 1 month). Their appearance and longitude are irregular due to a lack of synchronization with the anomalistic month (period of perigee), but groupings of 3 tritos cycles (≈ 33 years minus 3 months) come close (≈ 434.044 anomalistic months), so eclipses are similar in these groupings.

Series members between 1801 and 2200
August 28, 1802 (Saros 122)	July 27, 1813 (Saros 123)	June 26, 1824 (Saros 124)	May 27, 1835 (Saros 125)	April 25, 1846 (Saros 126)
March 25, 1857 (Saros 127)	February 23, 1868 (Saros 128)	January 22, 1879 (Saros 129)	December 22, 1889 (Saros 130)	November 22, 1900 (Saros 131)
October 22, 1911 (Saros 132)	September 21, 1922 (Saros 133)	August 21, 1933 (Saros 134)	July 20, 1944 (Saros 135)	June 20, 1955 (Saros 136)
May 20, 1966 (Saros 137)	April 18, 1977 (Saros 138)	March 18, 1988 (Saros 139)	February 16, 1999 (Saros 140)	January 15, 2010 (Saros 141)
December 14, 2020 (Saros 142)	November 14, 2031 (Saros 143)	October 14, 2042 (Saros 144)	September 12, 2053 (Saros 145)	August 12, 2064 (Saros 146)
July 13, 2075 (Saros 147)	June 11, 2086 (Saros 148)	May 11, 2097 (Saros 149)	April 11, 2108 (Saros 150)	March 11, 2119 (Saros 151)
February 8, 2130 (Saros 152)	January 8, 2141 (Saros 153)	December 8, 2151 (Saros 154)	November 7, 2162 (Saros 155)	October 7, 2173 (Saros 156)
September 4, 2184 (Saros 157)	August 5, 2195 (Saros 158)			

=== Inex series ===
This eclipse is a part of the long period inex cycle, repeating at alternating nodes, every 358 synodic months (≈ 10,571.95 days, or 29 years minus 20 days). Their appearance and longitude are irregular due to a lack of synchronization with the anomalistic month (period of perigee). However, groupings of 3 inex cycles (≈ 87 years minus 2 months) comes close (≈ 1,151.02 anomalistic months), so eclipses are similar in these groupings.

Series members between 1801 and 2200
May 5, 1818 (Saros 135)	April 15, 1847 (Saros 136)	March 25, 1876 (Saros 137)
March 6, 1905 (Saros 138)	February 14, 1934 (Saros 139)	January 25, 1963 (Saros 140)
January 4, 1992 (Saros 141)	December 14, 2020 (Saros 142)	November 25, 2049 (Saros 143)
November 4, 2078 (Saros 144)	October 16, 2107 (Saros 145)	September 26, 2136 (Saros 146)
September 5, 2165 (Saros 147)	August 16, 2194 (Saros 148)	
