= C/2020 X3 (SOHO) =

Kreutz sungrazer comet

C/2020 X3 (SOHO) (Eclipse Comet of 2020)
Discovery
- Discovered by: SOHO; Worachate Boonplod
- Discovery date: 13 December 2020

Designations
- Alternative designations: SOHO-4108, CK20X030

Orbital characteristics
- Epoch: 14 December 2020 (JD 2459198.44587)
- Observation arc: 22.89 hours (Note: Observation arc from the Minor Planet Center database covering dates from 13 December 2020 until 14 December 2020.)
- Number of observations: 123
- Orbit type: Kreutz sungrazer
- Perihelion: 0.005 AU
- Eccentricity: ~1.000
- Max. orbital speed: 200 km/s
- Inclination: 143.94°
- Longitude of ascending node: 357.16°
- Argument of periapsis: 77.358°
- Last perihelion: 14 December 2020

Physical characteristics
- Mean diameter: 0.015 km (0.0093 mi)
- Apparent magnitude: 5.1 (2020 apparition)

C/2020 X3 (SOHO), also known as SOHO-4108, is the 3,534th Kreutz sungrazer comet discovered by the Solar and Heliospheric Observatory (SOHO). It is notable for appearing during the total solar eclipse of 14 December 2020. Due to its small size, only about a few meters across, it completely disintegrated upon perihelion only 22 hours after being discovered.

== See also ==
- X/1882 K1 (Tewfik) – the Eclipse Comet of 1882, also a member of the Kreutz sungrazers.
- C/1948 V1 – the Eclipse Comet of 1948.
