= December 2011 lunar eclipse =

Total lunar eclipse of 10 December 2011

- Total eclipse
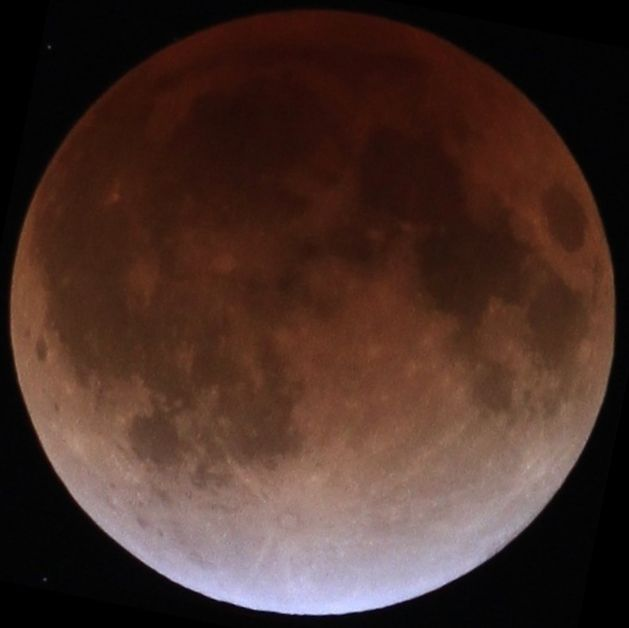
- Totality as viewed from Singapore, 14:40 UTC
- Date: December 10, 2011
- Gamma: −0.3882
- Magnitude: 1.1076
- Saros cycle: 135 (23 of 71)
- Totality: 51 minutes, 8 seconds
- Partiality: 212 minutes, 15 seconds
- Penumbral: 356 minutes, 21 seconds
Contacts (UTC)
- P1: 11:33:36
- U1: 12:45:43
- U2: 14:06:16
- Greatest: 14:31:49
- U3: 14:57:24
- U4: 16:17:58
- P4: 17:29:57

A total lunar eclipse occurred at the Moon’s descending node of orbit on Saturday, December 10, 2011, with an umbral magnitude of 1.1076. A lunar eclipse occurs when the Moon moves into the Earth's shadow, causing the Moon to be darkened. A total lunar eclipse occurs when the Moon's near side entirely passes into the Earth's umbral shadow. Unlike a solar eclipse, which can only be viewed from a relatively small area of the world, a lunar eclipse may be viewed from anywhere on the night side of Earth. A total lunar eclipse can last up to nearly two hours, while a total solar eclipse lasts only a few minutes at any given place, because the Moon's shadow is smaller. Occurring about 4.8 days after apogee (on December 5, 2011, at 20:10 UTC), the Moon's apparent diameter was smaller.

== Visibility ==
The eclipse was completely visible over east and northern Asia, Australia, and northern North America, seen rising over Europe and east and central Africa, and setting over North America.

Hourly motion shown right to left	The Moon's hourly motion across the Earth's shadow in the constellation of Taurus.
Visibility map

== Images ==
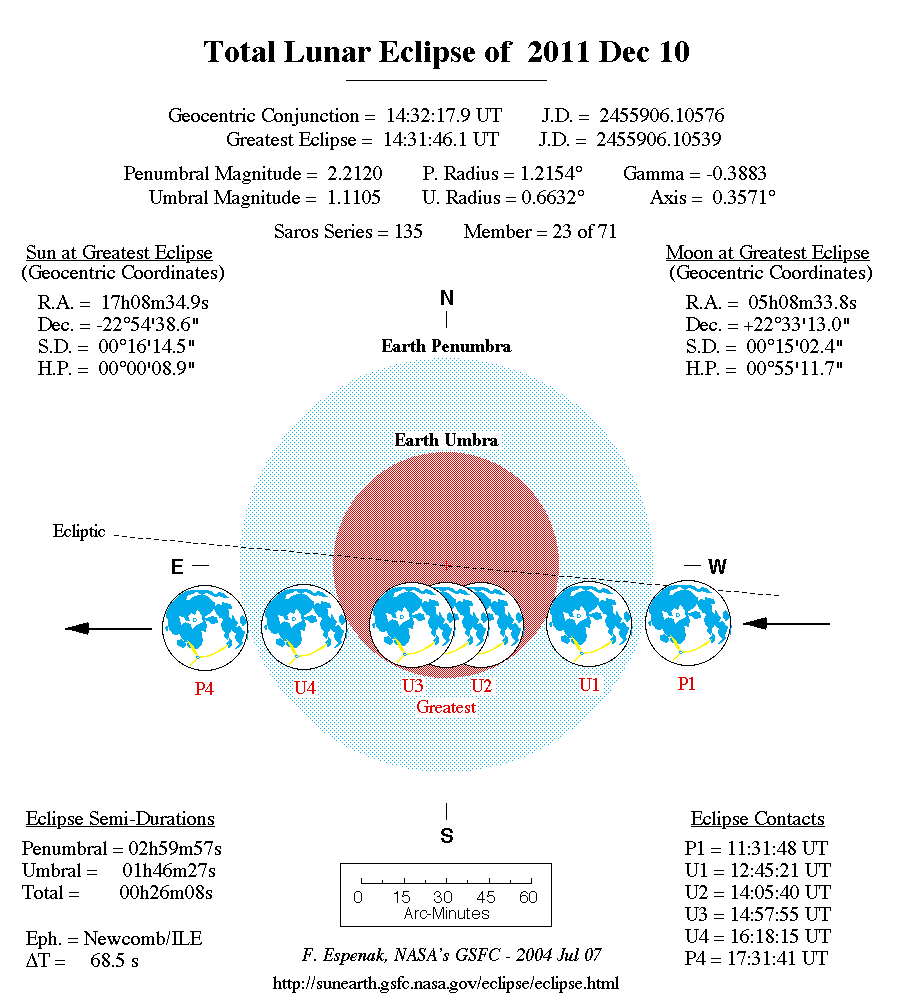
NASA chart of the eclipse

== Gallery ==
Asia

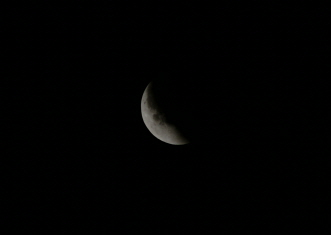
Seoul, South Korea

Japan

Japan

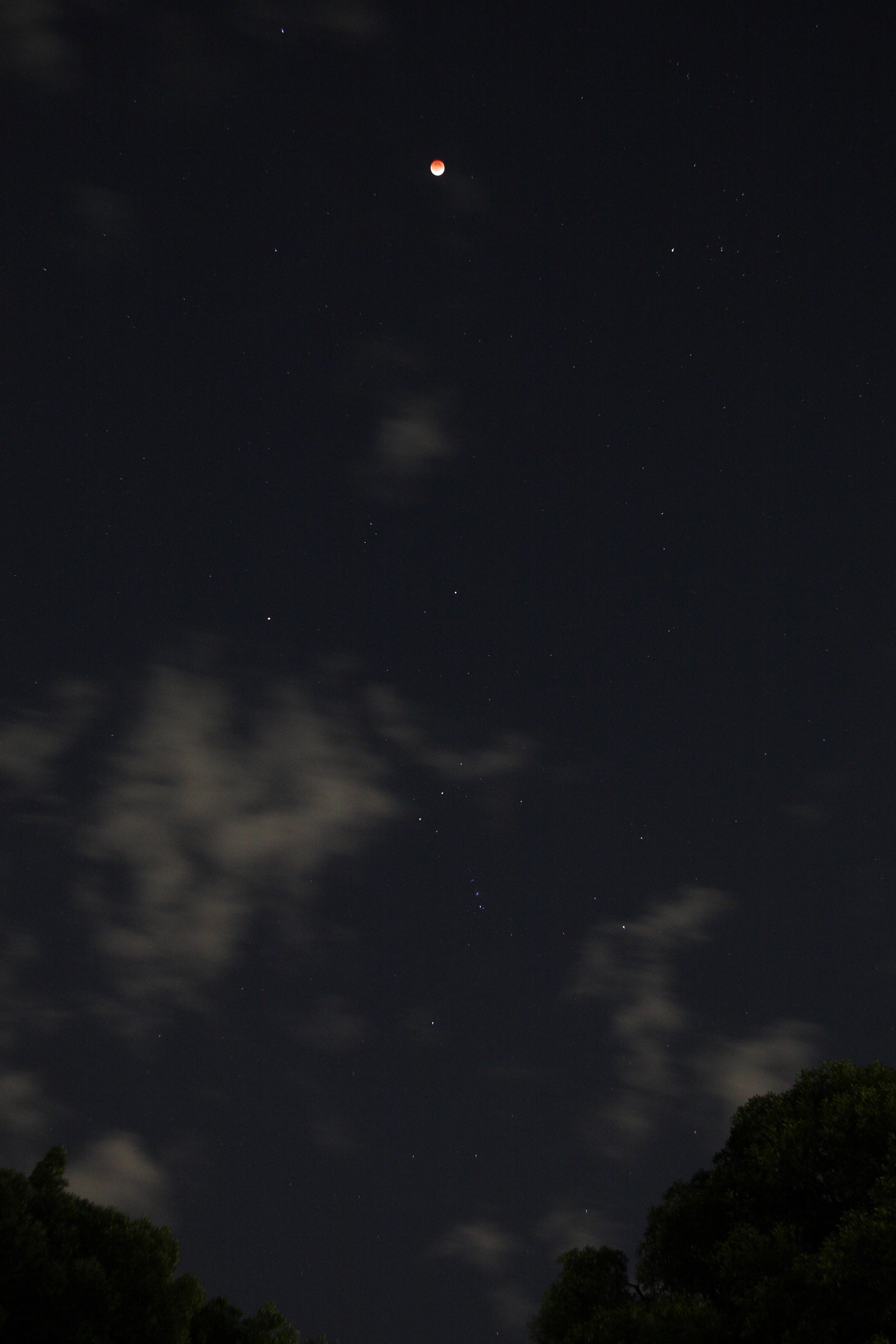
Tokyo, Japan
Wide view with Orion

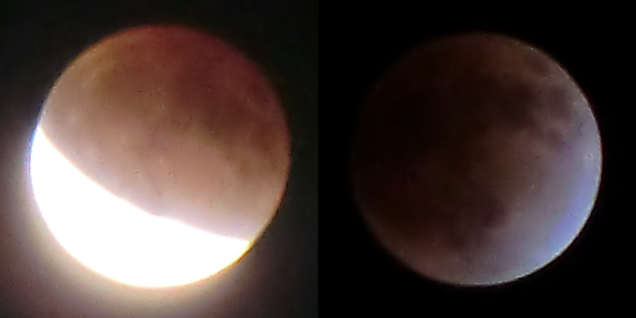
Beijing, China

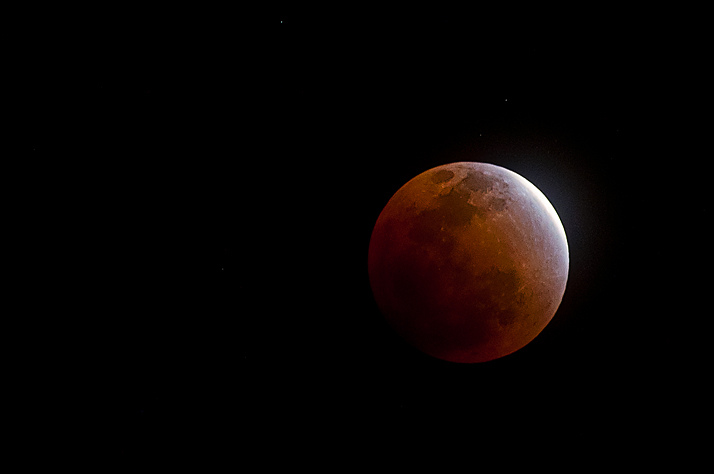
Laguna, Philippines, 13:49 UTC

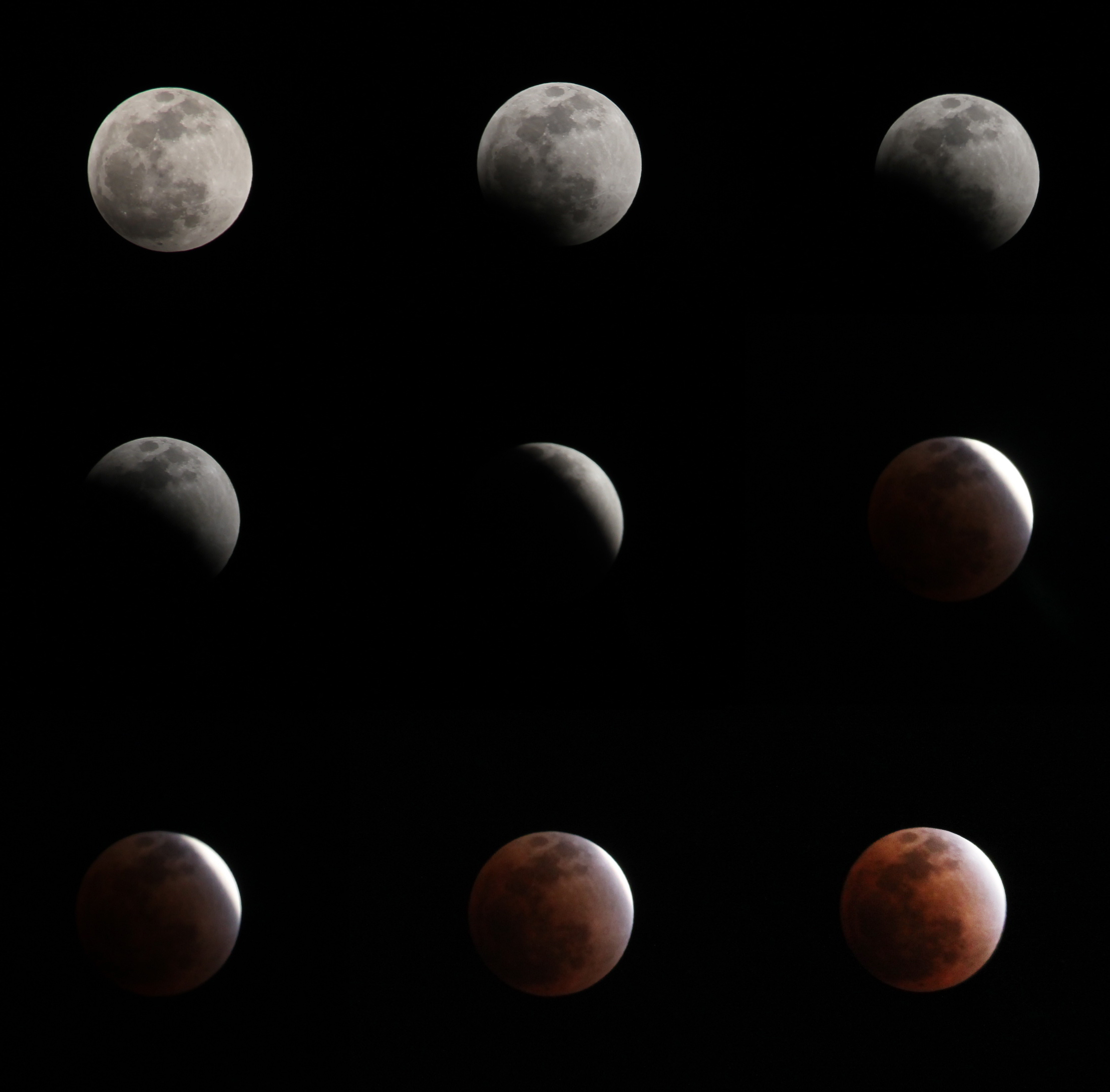
Bangkok, Thailand, 12:46-13:57 UTC

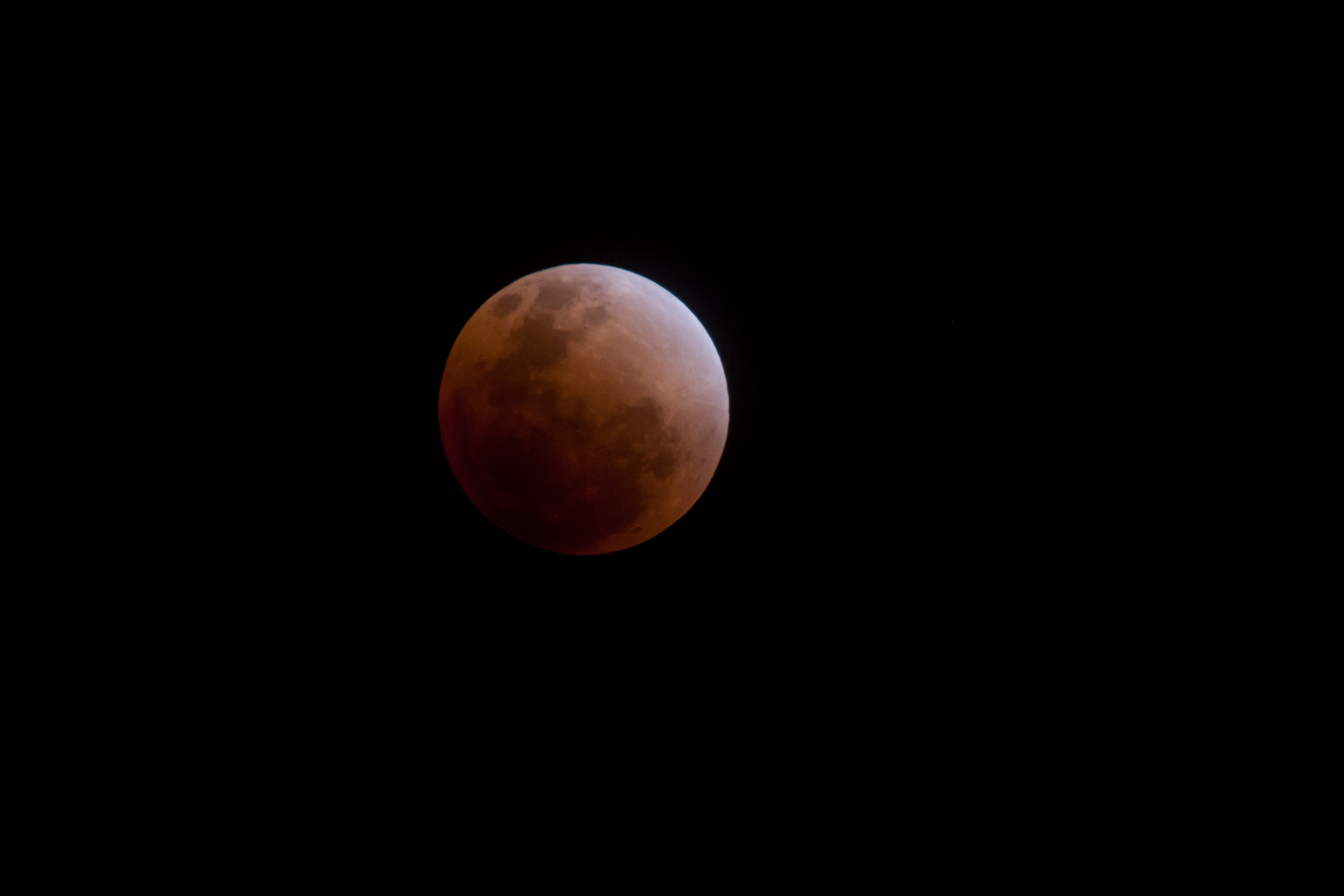
Singapore, 14:10 UTC

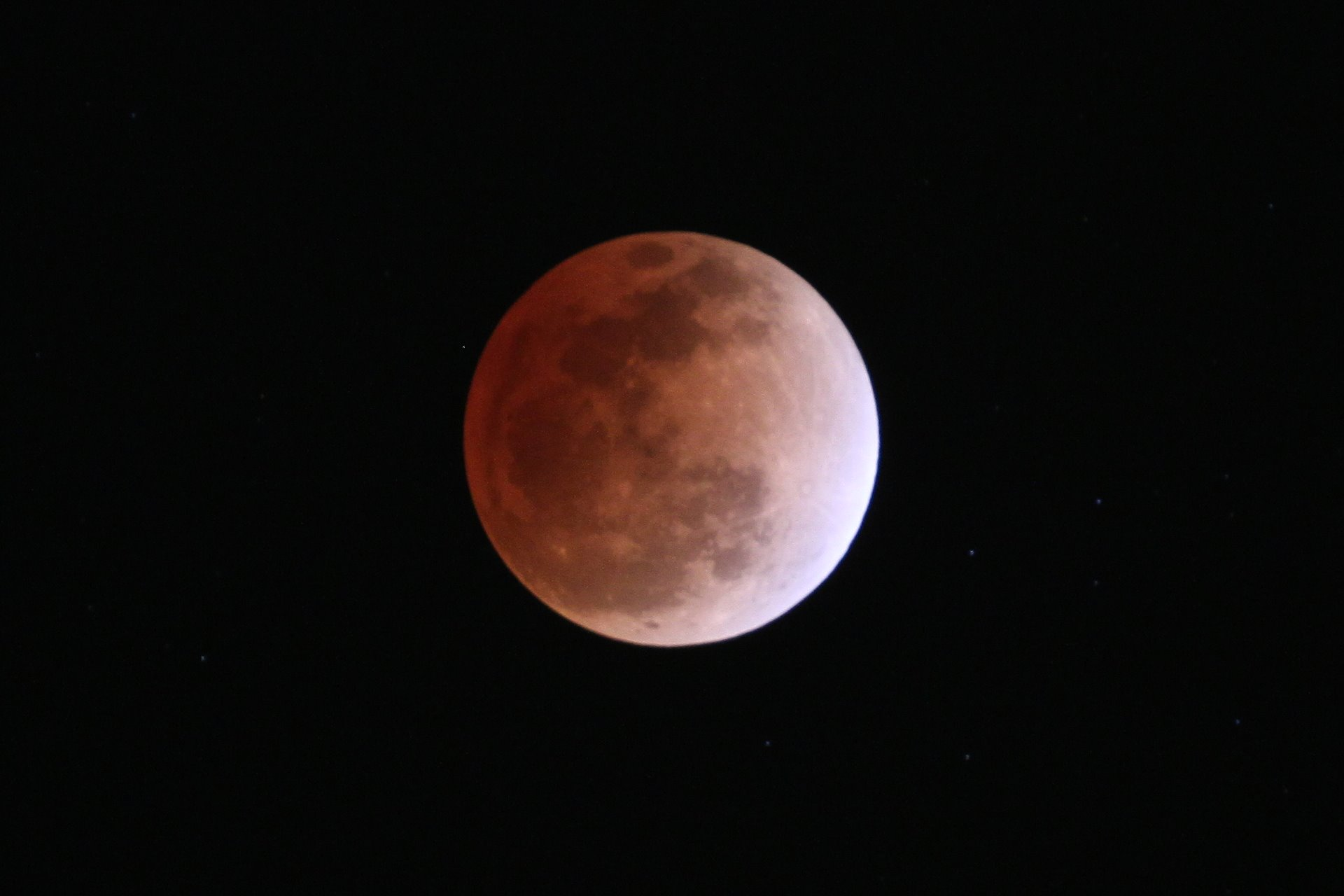
Lam Tin, Hong Kong, 14:47 UTC

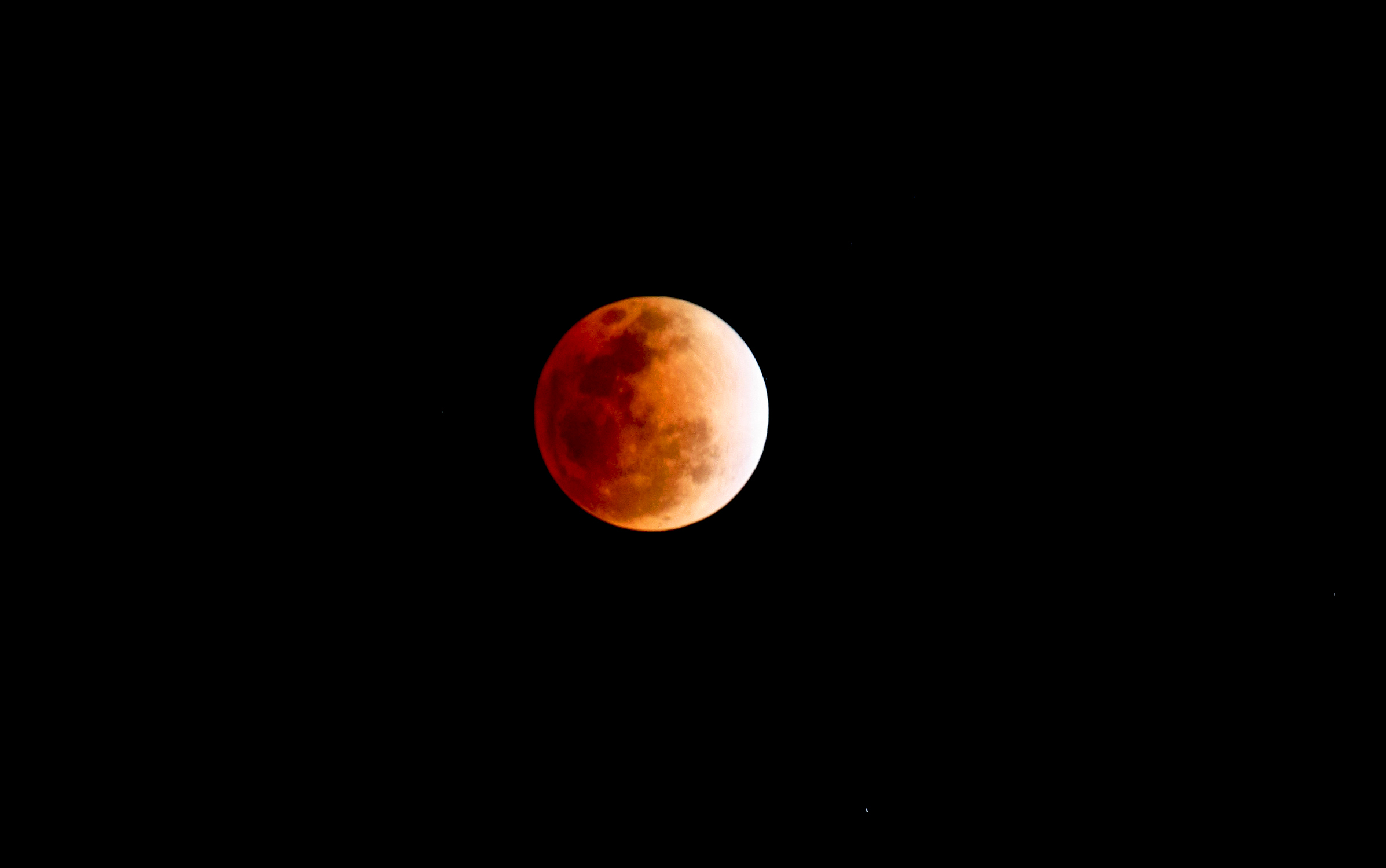
Batticaloa, Sri Lanka, 15:07 UTC

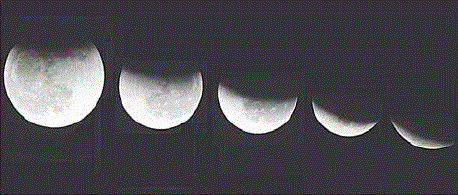
Rawalpindi, Pakistan

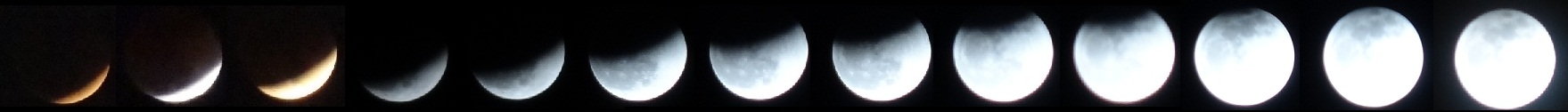
New Delhi, India

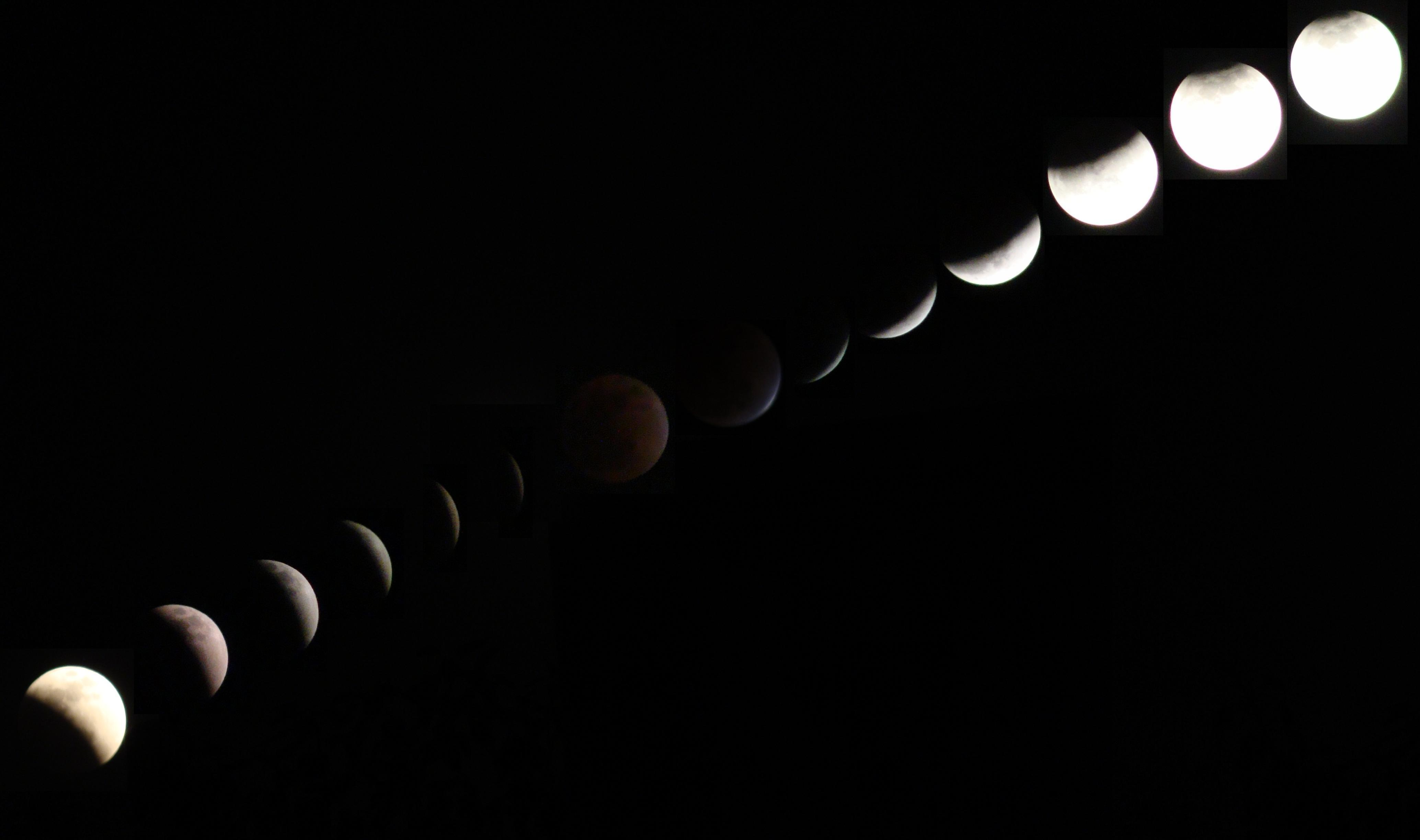
Mumbai, India

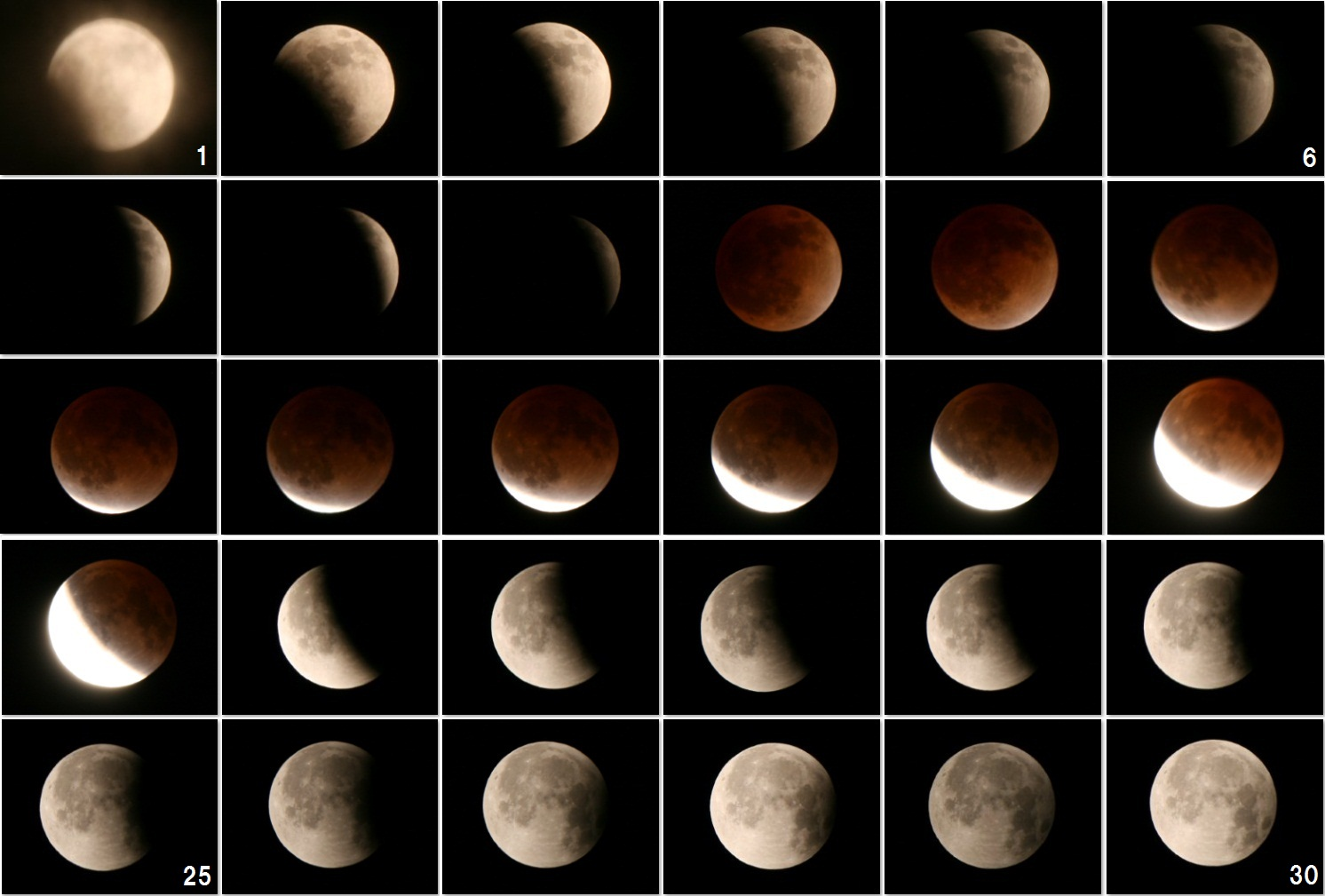
Japan

Australia and Oceania

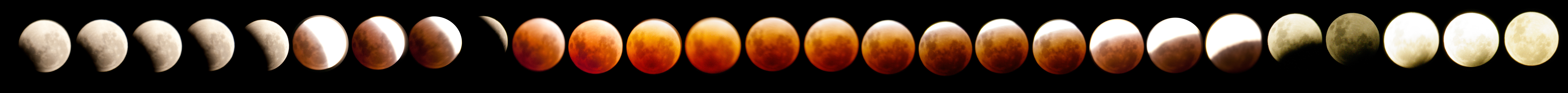
Sequence from 20:12 Dec 11 until 00:19 Dec 12 (AWST, UTC +8) Serpentine Dam, Western Australia view right to left as the moon passed across the sky

Europe and Middle East

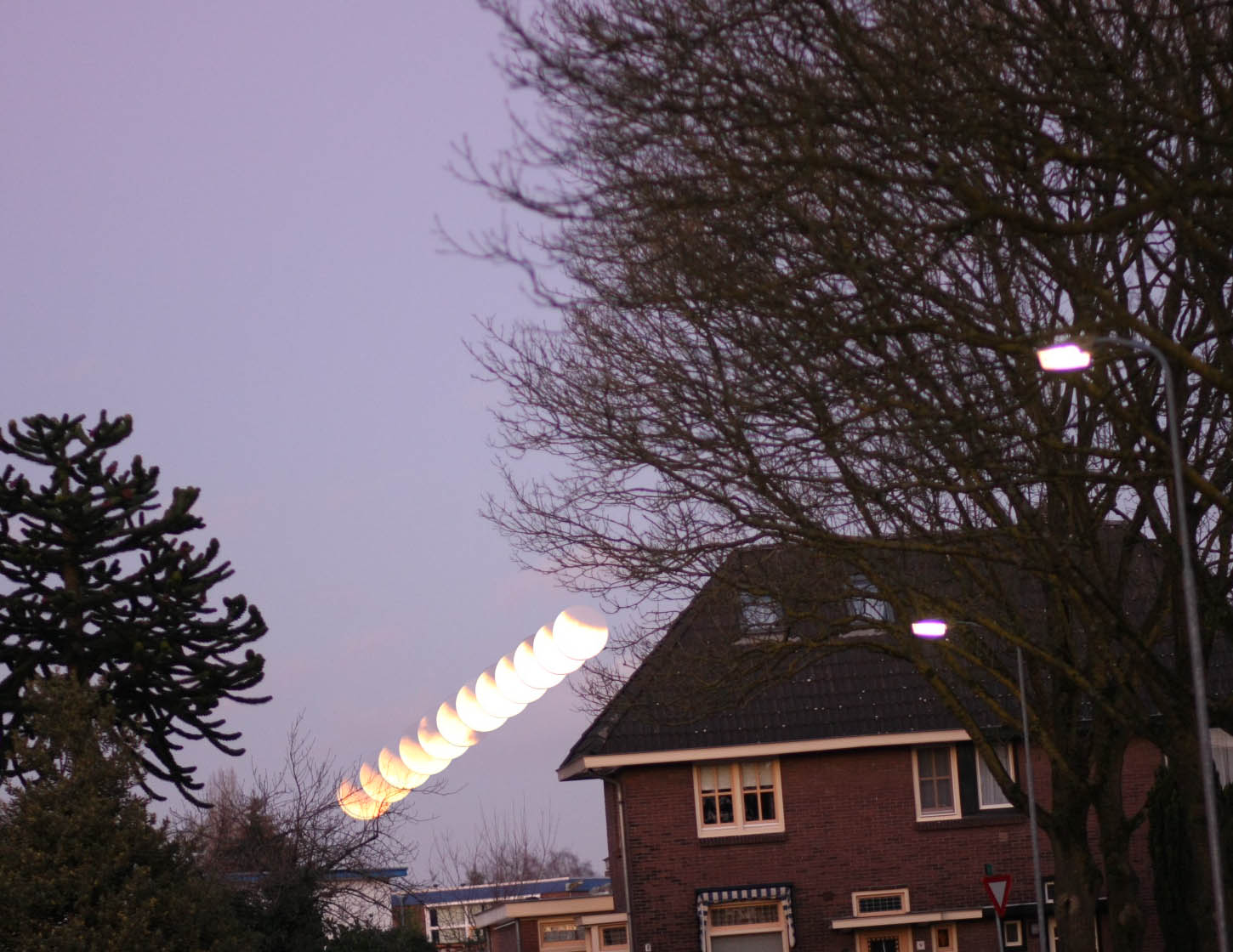
End of Lunar Eclipse from the Netherlands, 12 images merged

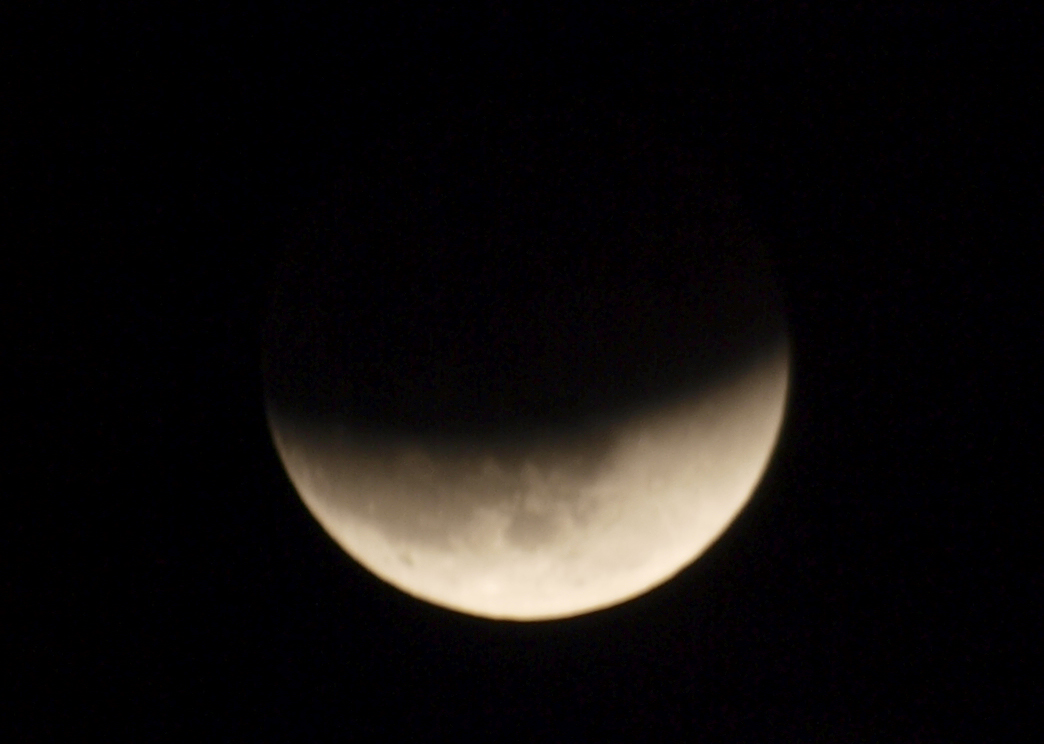
Modi'in, Israel.

North America

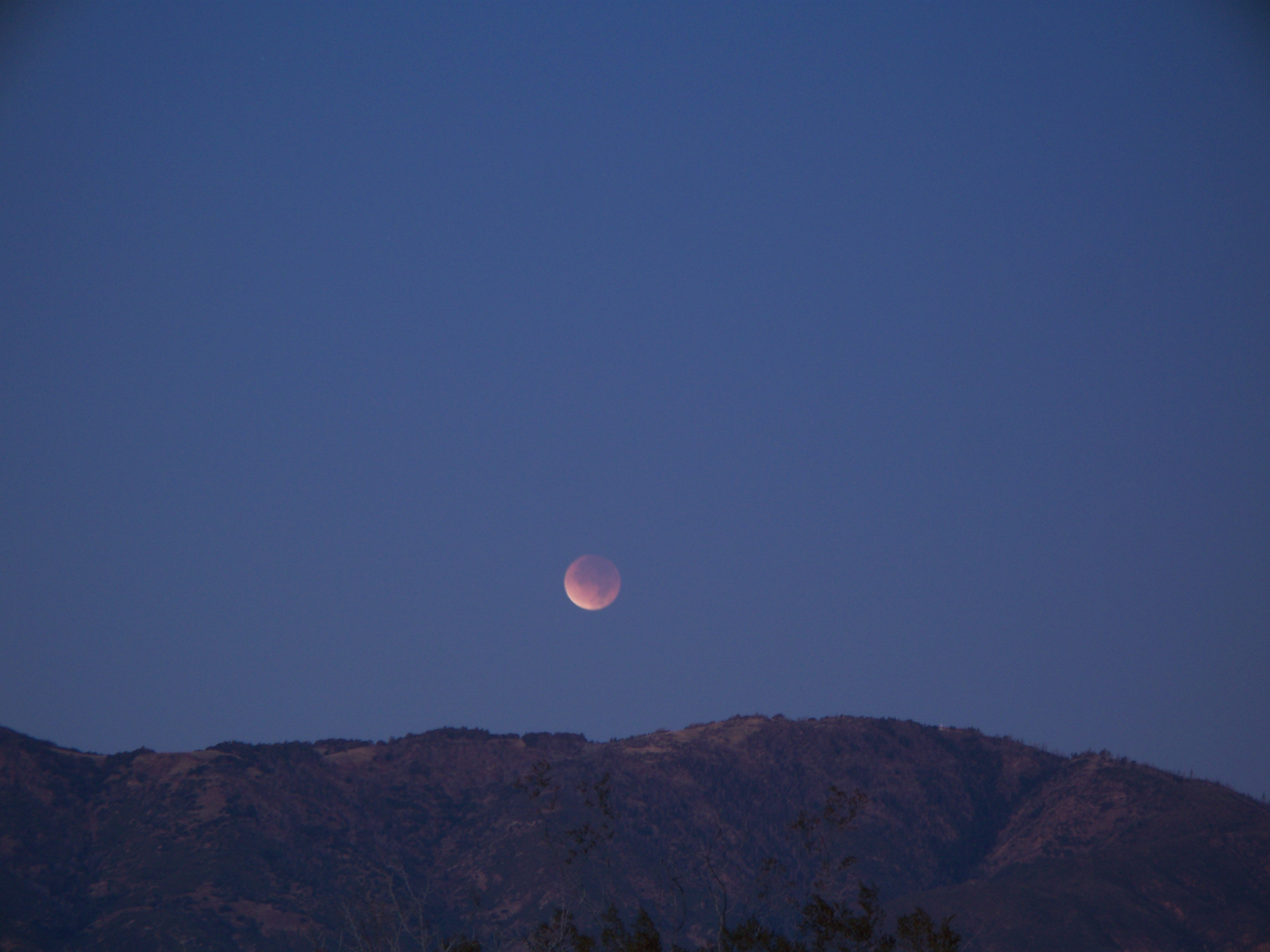
Peninsular Ranges of Southern California, just before moonset.

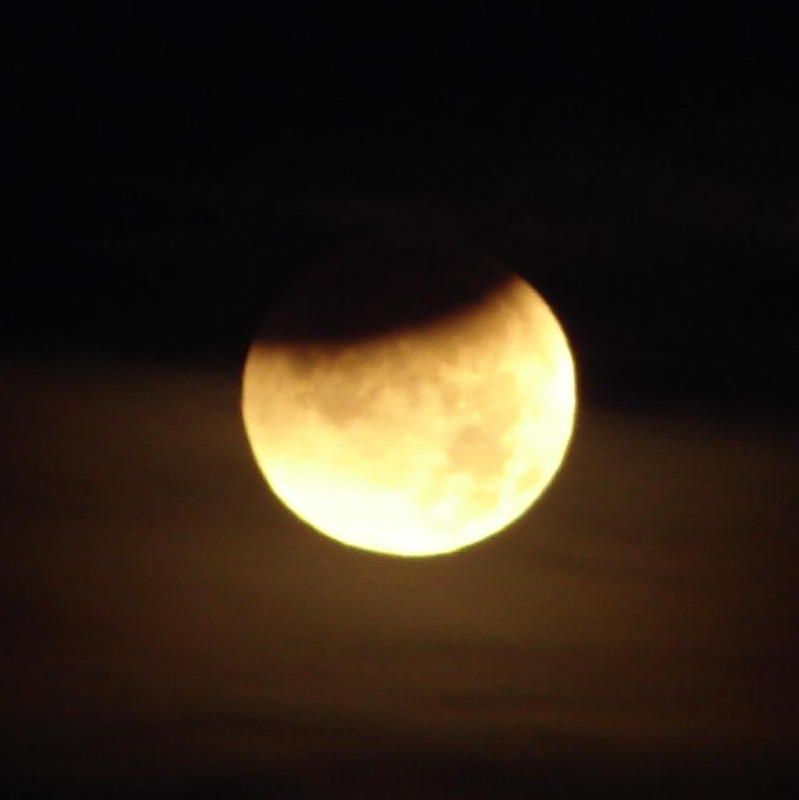
Minneapolis, Minnesota, 13:05 UTC

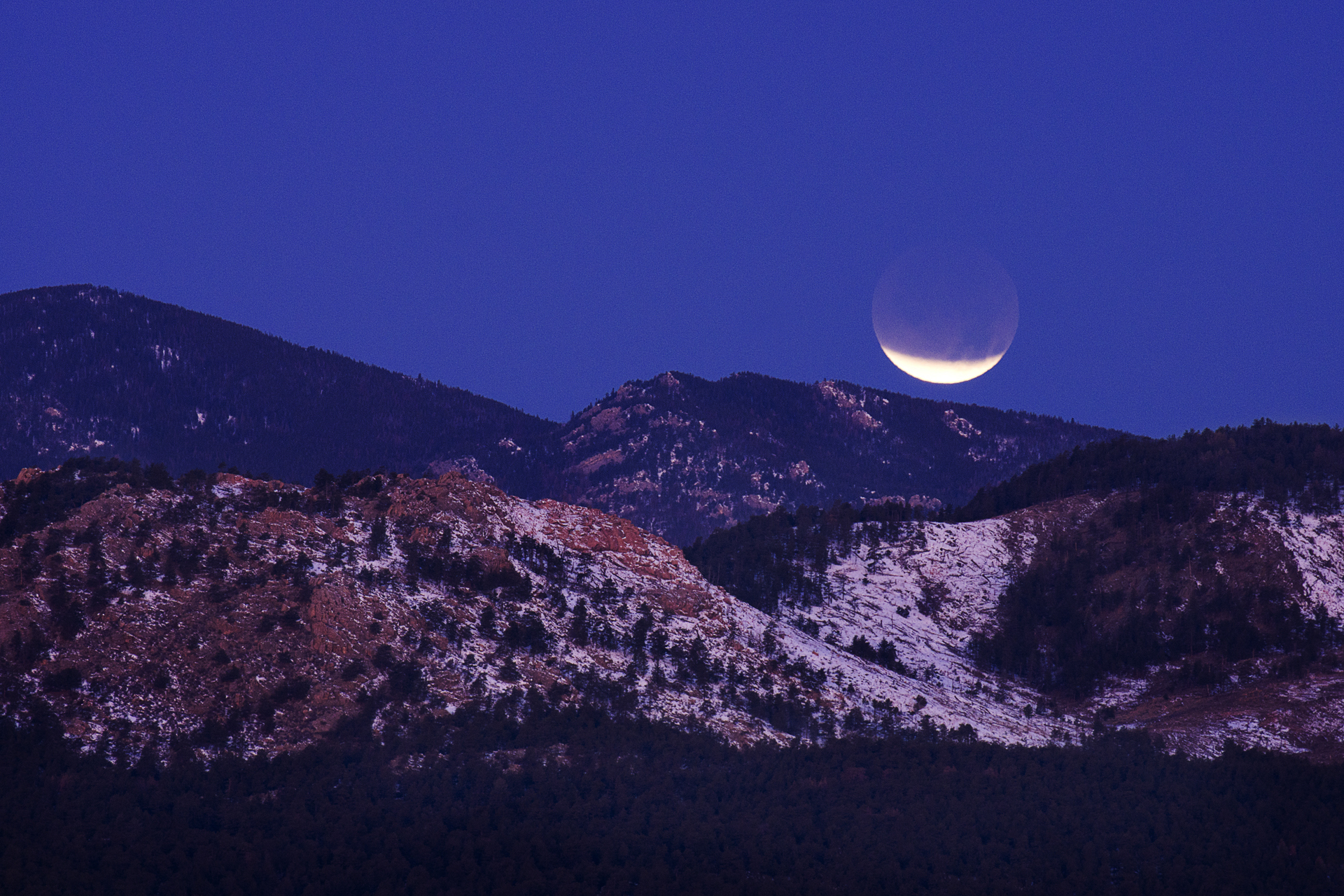
Loveland, Colorado, 13:49 UTC

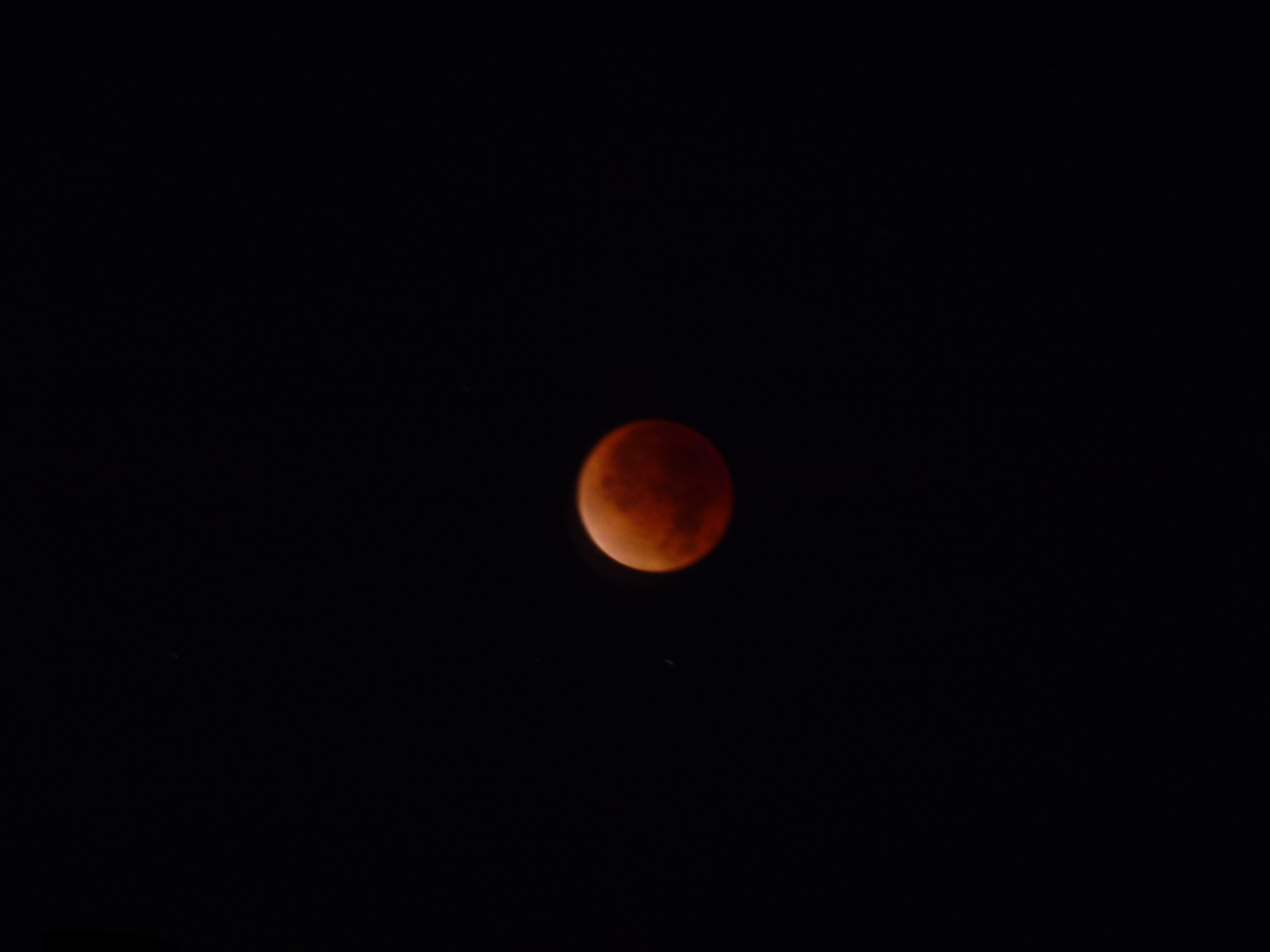
Medford, Oregon, 14:34 UTC

Madison, Wisconsin

== Timing ==
=== Times for Australia ===
The eclipse occurred on Saturday evening in Australia. Eastern Daylight Saving Time: (+11:00 UTC)

- Penumbral Eclipse Begins: 22:33:32 EDST
- Partial Eclipse Begins: 23:45:42 EDST
- Total Eclipse Begins: 01:06:16 EDST
- Greatest Eclipse: 01:31:49 EDST
- Total Eclipse Ends: 01:57:24 EDST
- Partial Eclipse Ends: 03:17:58 EDST
- Penumbral Eclipse Ends: 04:30:00 EDST

=== Times for India ===
The eclipse was visible from India in the evening, given in India Standard Time (UTC+5:30):

- Penumbral eclipse begins (P1): 17:04 IST
- Partial eclipse begins (U1): 18:16 IST
- Total eclipse begins (U2): 19:36 IST
- Mid-eclipse: 20:02 IST
- Total eclipse ends (U3): 20:27 IST
- Partial eclipse ends (U4): 21:48 IST
- Penumbral eclipse ends (P4): 23:00 IST

=== Times for North America ===
The eclipse was visible on Saturday morning before sunrise over North America. For most locations, the moon set before full lunar eclipse. Only Alaska and northernmost Canada will be able to witness the entire event.

Contact	North America					UTC
Contact	AST (UTC−9)	PST (UTC−8)	MST (UTC−7)	CST (UTC−6)	EST (UTC−5)	UTC
Penumbral begins (P1)	2:34 am	3:34 am	4:34 am	5:34 am	6:34 am	11:34
Partial begins (U1)	3:46 am	4:46 am	5:46 am	6:46 am	7:46 am	12:46
Totality begins (U2)	5:06 am	6:06 am	7:06 am	8:06 am	9:06 am	14:06
Mid-eclipse	5:32 am	6:32 am	7:32 am	8:32 am	9:32 am	14:32
Totality ends (U3)	5:57 am	6:57 am	7:57 am	8:57 am	9:57 am	14:57
Partial ends (U4)	7:18 am	8:18 am	9:18 am	10:18 am	11:18 am	16:18
Penumbral ends (P4)	8:30 am	9:30 am	10:30 am	11:30 am	12:30 pm	17:30
(Table entries are given a dark background for invisibility due to moonset)

== Eclipse details ==
Shown below is a table displaying details about this particular lunar eclipse. It describes various parameters pertaining to this eclipse.

December 10, 2011 Lunar Eclipse Parameters
Parameter	Value
Penumbral Magnitude	2.18746
Umbral Magnitude	1.10757
Gamma	−0.38819
Sun Right Ascension	17h08m35.0s
Sun Declination	-22°54'38.7"
Sun Semi-Diameter	16'14.5"
Sun Equatorial Horizontal Parallax	08.9"
Moon Right Ascension	05h08m33.9s
Moon Declination	+22°33'13.3"
Moon Semi-Diameter	15'02.4"
Moon Equatorial Horizontal Parallax	0°55'11.7"
ΔT	66.7 s

== Eclipse season ==
This eclipse is part of an eclipse season, a period, roughly every six months, when eclipses occur. Only two (or occasionally three) eclipse seasons occur each year, and each season lasts about 35 days and repeats just short of six months (173 days) later; thus two full eclipse seasons always occur each year. Either two or three eclipses happen each eclipse season. In the sequence below, each eclipse is separated by a fortnight.

Eclipse season of November–December 2011
November 25 Ascending node (new moon)	December 10 Descending node (full moon)
Partial solar eclipse Solar Saros 123	Total lunar eclipse Lunar Saros 135

== Related eclipses ==
=== Eclipses in 2011 ===
- A partial solar eclipse on January 4.
- A partial solar eclipse on June 1.
- A total lunar eclipse on June 15.
- A partial solar eclipse on July 1.
- A partial solar eclipse on November 25.
- A total lunar eclipse on December 10.

=== Metonic ===
- Preceded by: Lunar eclipse of February 21, 2008
- Followed by: Lunar eclipse of September 28, 2015

=== Tzolkinex ===
- Preceded by: Lunar eclipse of October 28, 2004
- Followed by: Lunar eclipse of January 21, 2019

=== Half-Saros ===
- Preceded by: Solar eclipse of December 4, 2002
- Followed by: Solar eclipse of December 14, 2020

=== Tritos ===
- Preceded by: Lunar eclipse of January 9, 2001
- Followed by: Lunar eclipse of November 8, 2022

=== Lunar Saros 135 ===
- Preceded by: Lunar eclipse of November 29, 1993
- Followed by: Lunar eclipse of December 20, 2029

=== Inex ===
- Preceded by: Lunar eclipse of December 30, 1982
- Followed by: Lunar eclipse of November 18, 2040

=== Triad ===
- Preceded by: Lunar eclipse of February 8, 1925
- Followed by: Lunar eclipse of October 10, 2098

=== Lunar eclipses of 2009–2013 ===
This eclipse is a member of a semester series. An eclipse in a semester series of lunar eclipses repeats approximately every 177 days and 4 hours (a semester) at alternating nodes of the Moon's orbit.

The penumbral lunar eclipses on February 9, 2009 and August 6, 2009 occur in the previous lunar year eclipse set, and the lunar eclipses on April 25, 2013 (partial) and October 18, 2013 (penumbral) occur in the next lunar year eclipse set.

Lunar eclipse series sets from 2009 to 2013
Ascending node				Descending node			
Saros	Date Viewing	Type Chart	Gamma	Saros	Date Viewing	Type Chart	Gamma
110	2009 Jul 07	Penumbral	−1.4916	115	2009 Dec 31	Partial	0.9766
120	2010 Jun 26	Partial	−0.7091	125	2010 Dec 21	Total	0.3214
130	2011 Jun 15	Total	0.0897	135	2011 Dec 10	Total	−0.3882
140	2012 Jun 04	Partial	0.8248	145	2012 Nov 28	Penumbral	−1.0869
150	2013 May 25	Penumbral	1.5351				

=== Saros 135 ===
This eclipse is a part of Saros series 135, repeating every 18 years, 11 days, and containing 71 events. The series started with a penumbral lunar eclipse on April 13, 1615. It contains partial eclipses from July 20, 1777 through October 28, 1939; total eclipses from November 7, 1957 through July 6, 2354; and a second set of partial eclipses from July 16, 2372 through September 19, 2480. The series ends at member 71 as a penumbral eclipse on May 18, 2877.

The longest duration of totality will be produced by member 37 at 106 minutes, 13 seconds on May 12, 2264. All eclipses in this series occur at the Moon’s descending node of orbit.

Greatest	First			
The greatest eclipse of the series will occur on 2264 May 12, lasting 106 minutes, 13 seconds.	Penumbral	Partial	Total	Central
The greatest eclipse of the series will occur on 2264 May 12, lasting 106 minutes, 13 seconds.	1615 Apr 13	1777 Jul 20	1957 Nov 07	2174 Mar 18
The greatest eclipse of the series will occur on 2264 May 12, lasting 106 minutes, 13 seconds.	Last			
The greatest eclipse of the series will occur on 2264 May 12, lasting 106 minutes, 13 seconds.	Central	Total	Partial	Penumbral
The greatest eclipse of the series will occur on 2264 May 12, lasting 106 minutes, 13 seconds.	2318 Jun 14	2354 Jul 06	2480 Sep 19	2877 May 18

Eclipses are tabulated in three columns; every third eclipse in the same column is one exeligmos apart, so they all cast shadows over approximately the same parts of the Earth.

Series members 12–33 occur between 1801 and 2200:
12	13	14
1813 Aug 12	1831 Aug 23	1849 Sep 02
15	16	17
1867 Sep 14	1885 Sep 24	1903 Oct 06
18	19	20
1921 Oct 16	1939 Oct 28	1957 Nov 07
21	22	23
1975 Nov 18	1993 Nov 29	2011 Dec 10
24	25	26
2029 Dec 20	2048 Jan 01	2066 Jan 11
27	28	29
2084 Jan 22	2102 Feb 03	2120 Feb 14
30	31	32
2138 Feb 24	2156 Mar 07	2174 Mar 18
33
2192 Mar 28

=== Tritos series ===
This eclipse is a part of a tritos cycle, repeating at alternating nodes every 135 synodic months (≈ 3986.63 days, or 11 years minus 1 month). Their appearance and longitude are irregular due to a lack of synchronization with the anomalistic month (period of perigee), but groupings of 3 tritos cycles (≈ 33 years minus 3 months) come close (≈ 434.044 anomalistic months), so eclipses are similar in these groupings.

Series members between 1801 and 2200
1804 Jul 22 (Saros 116)	1815 Jun 21 (Saros 117)	1826 May 21 (Saros 118)	1837 Apr 20 (Saros 119)	1848 Mar 19 (Saros 120)
1859 Feb 17 (Saros 121)	1870 Jan 17 (Saros 122)	1880 Dec 16 (Saros 123)	1891 Nov 16 (Saros 124)	1902 Oct 17 (Saros 125)
1913 Sep 15 (Saros 126)	1924 Aug 14 (Saros 127)	1935 Jul 16 (Saros 128)	1946 Jun 14 (Saros 129)	1957 May 13 (Saros 130)
1968 Apr 13 (Saros 131)	1979 Mar 13 (Saros 132)	1990 Feb 09 (Saros 133)	2001 Jan 09 (Saros 134)	2011 Dec 10 (Saros 135)
2022 Nov 08 (Saros 136)	2033 Oct 08 (Saros 137)	2044 Sep 07 (Saros 138)	2055 Aug 07 (Saros 139)	2066 Jul 07 (Saros 140)
2077 Jun 06 (Saros 141)	2088 May 05 (Saros 142)	2099 Apr 05 (Saros 143)	2110 Mar 06 (Saros 144)	2121 Feb 02 (Saros 145)
2132 Jan 02 (Saros 146)	2142 Dec 03 (Saros 147)	2153 Nov 01 (Saros 148)	2164 Sep 30 (Saros 149)	2175 Aug 31 (Saros 150)
2186 Jul 31 (Saros 151)	2197 Jun 29 (Saros 152)			

=== Inex series ===
This eclipse is a part of the long period inex cycle, repeating at alternating nodes, every 358 synodic months (≈ 10,571.95 days, or 29 years minus 20 days). Their appearance and longitude are irregular due to a lack of synchronization with the anomalistic month (period of perigee). However, groupings of 3 inex cycles (≈ 87 years minus 2 months) comes close (≈ 1,151.02 anomalistic months), so eclipses are similar in these groupings.

Series members between 1801 and 2200
1809 Apr 30 (Saros 128)	1838 Apr 10 (Saros 129)	1867 Mar 20 (Saros 130)
1896 Feb 28 (Saros 131)	1925 Feb 08 (Saros 132)	1954 Jan 19 (Saros 133)
1982 Dec 30 (Saros 134)	2011 Dec 10 (Saros 135)	2040 Nov 18 (Saros 136)
2069 Oct 30 (Saros 137)	2098 Oct 10 (Saros 138)	2127 Sep 20 (Saros 139)
2156 Aug 30 (Saros 140)	2185 Aug 11 (Saros 141)	

=== Half-Saros cycle ===
A lunar eclipse will be preceded and followed by solar eclipses by 9 years and 5.5 days (a half saros). This lunar eclipse is related to two total solar eclipses of Solar Saros 142.

December 4, 2002	December 14, 2020

== See also ==
- List of lunar eclipses and List of 21st-century lunar eclipses
- December 2010 lunar eclipse
- June 2011 lunar eclipse
- File:2011-12-10 Lunar Eclipse Sketch.gif Chart
