= Ministro Ramos Mexía =

Coordinates: 40°30′S 67°17′W

- Municipality and village
- Interactive map of Ministro Ramos Mexía
- Country: Argentina
- Province: Río Negro Province
- Time zone: UTC−3 (ART)
- Climate: BSk

Ministro Ramos Mexía is a village and municipality in Río Negro Province in Argentina.
