= HamSCI =

The Amateur Radio Science Citizen Investigation (HamSCI) is an initiative to connect amateur radio operators with scientific researchers, and to use amateur radio as a citizen science tool to collect scientific data, particularly in geospace science. HamSCI holds annual workshops each year. Most HamSCI projects focus on the ionosphere. The central initiative of HamSCI is the Personal Space Weather Station, a project to conduct distributed sensing of space weather by developing modular hardware similar to traditional weather stations.
